= List of Washington Capitols players =

The following players were members of the now-defunct Washington Capitols professional basketball team.

- Edward Bartels
- Tommy Byrnes
- Don Carlson
- Hook Dillon
- Bob Feerick
- Bob Gantt
- Chuck Gilmur
- Chick Halbert
- Kleggie Hermsen
- Sidney Hertzberg
- Ken Keller
- Earl Lloyd
- John Mahnken
- John Mandic
- Ariel Maughan
- Bones McKinney
- Ed Mikan
- Jack Nichols
- Johnny Norlander
- Dick O'Keefe
- Buddy O'Grady
- Don Otten
- Chick Reiser
- Irv Rothenberg
- Alan Sawyer
- Herb Scherer
- Dick Schnittker
- Dick Schulz
- Fred Scolari
- Bill Sharman
- Jack Tingle
- Irv Torgoff
- Matt Zunic
