= List of NBA career field goal percentage leaders =

This article contains a list of the top 50 players with the highest all-time field goal percentage in the history of the National Basketball Association (NBA).

The list only includes regular season games and only includes players with at least 2,000 field goals made.

== Field goal percentage leaders ==
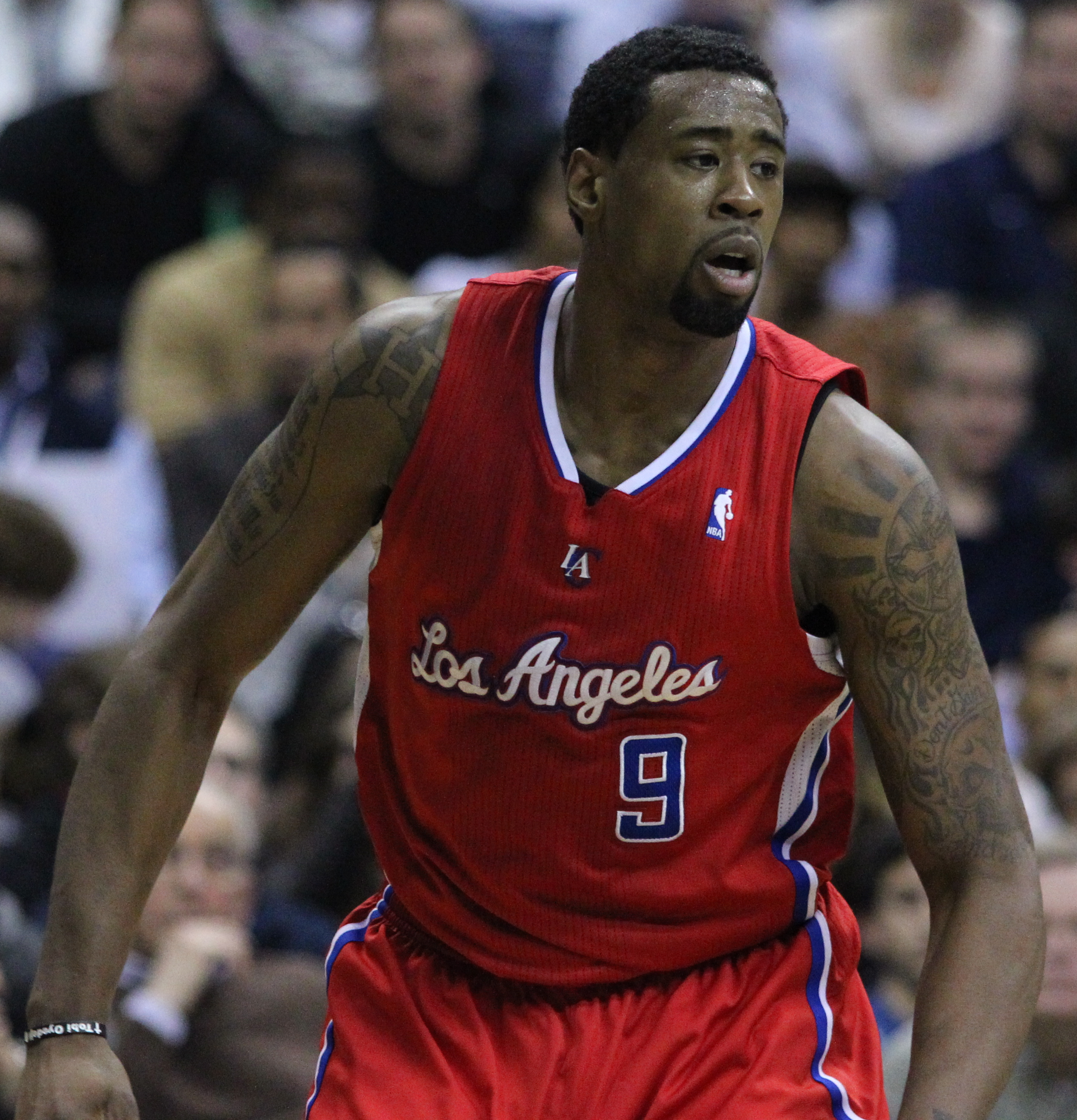
DeAndre Jordan has the highest field goal percentage in NBA history.

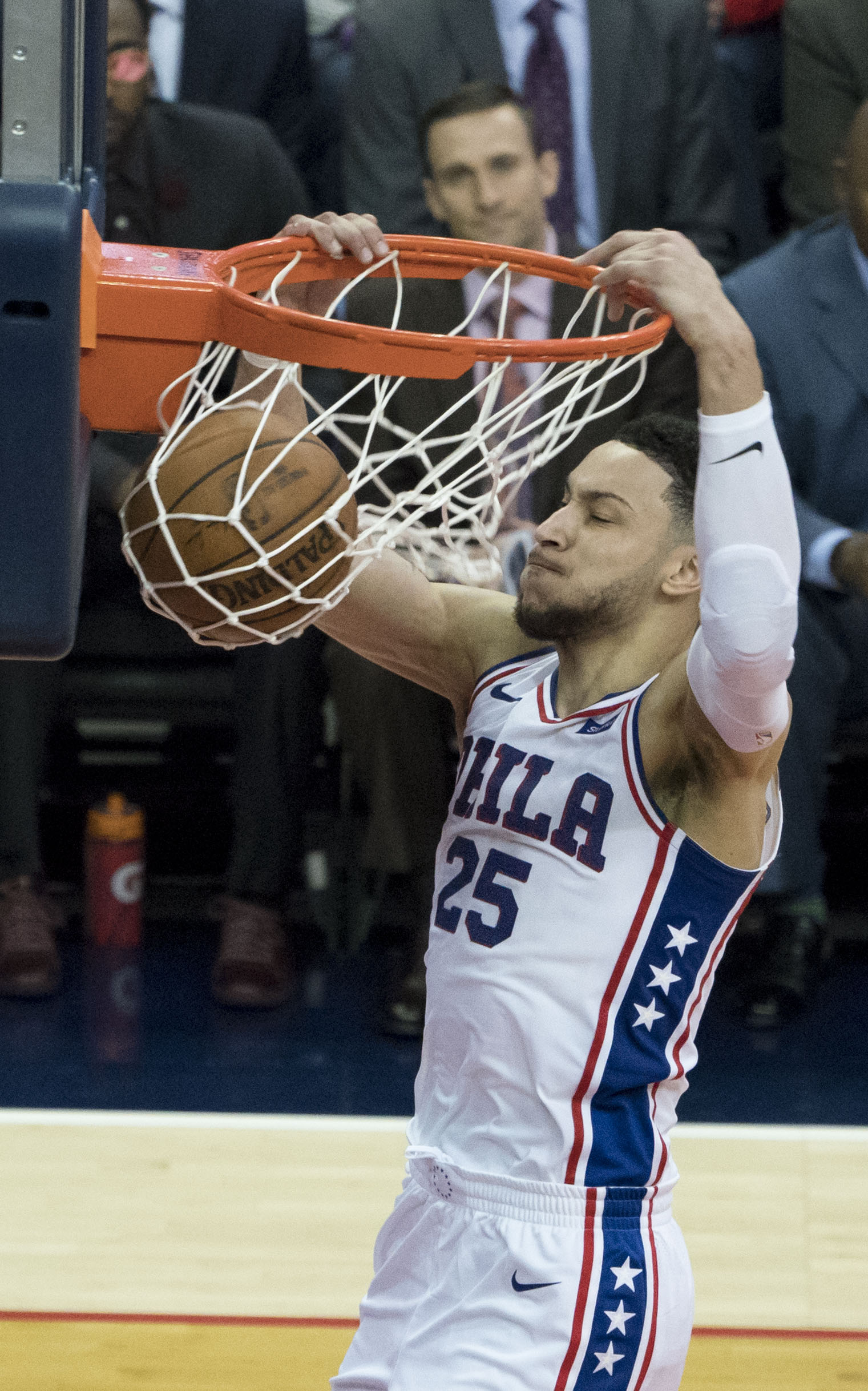
Ben Simmons has the highest field goal percentage among guards.

Statistics accurate as of November 15, 2026.

^	Active NBA player
*	Inducted into the Naismith Memorial Basketball Hall of Fame

Rank	Player	Pos	Team(s) played for (years) (Note: American Basketball Association (ABA) teams other than those admitted into the NBA in 1976 are not included; each year is linked to an article about that particular NBA season.)	Field goals percentage	Field goals made	Field goals attempted
1	DeAndre Jordan^	C	Los Angeles Clippers (2008–2018); Dallas Mavericks (2018–2019); New York Knicks (2019); Brooklyn Nets (2019–2021); Los Angeles Lakers (2021–2022); Philadelphia 76ers (2022); Denver Nuggets (2022–2025); New Orleans Pelicans (2025–present)	.6737	3,883	5,764
2	Rudy Gobert^	C	Utah Jazz (2013–2022); Minnesota Timberwolves (2022–present)	.6559	4,270	6,510
3	Jarrett Allen^	C	Brooklyn Nets (2017–2021); Cleveland Cavaliers (2021–present)	.6409	3,302	5,152
4	Jakob Pöltl^	C	Toronto Raptors (2016–2018, 2023–present); San Antonio Spurs (2018–2023)	.6359	2,607	4,100
5	Montrezl Harrell	C	Houston Rockets (2015–2017); Los Angeles Clippers (2017–2020); Los Angeles Lakers (2020–2021); Washington Wizards (2021–2022); Charlotte Hornets (2022); Philadelphia 76ers (2022–2023)	.6188	2,506	4,050
6	Ivica Zubac^	C	Los Angeles Lakers (2016–2019); Los Angeles Clippers (2019–2026); Indiana Pacers (2026–present)	.6132	2,784	4,540
7	Clint Capela^	C	Houston Rockets (2014–2020, 2025–present); Atlanta Hawks (2020–2025)	.6129	3,597	5,869
8	Deandre Ayton^	C	Phoenix Suns (2018–2023); Portland Trail Blazers (2023–2025); Los Angeles Lakers (2025–2026); Washington Wizards (2026–present)	.5991	3,337	5,570
9	Artis Gilmore*	C	Chicago Bulls (1976–1982, 1987); San Antonio Spurs (1982–1987); Boston Celtics (1988)	.5990	5,732	9,570
10	Tyson Chandler	C	Chicago Bulls (2001–2006); New Orleans Hornets (2006–2009) (Note: During the 2005–06 NBA season and 2006–07 NBA season, the team was known as the New Orleans/Oklahoma City Hornets during their temporary relocation to Oklahoma City due to Hurricane Katrina.); Charlotte Bobcats (2009–2010); Dallas Mavericks (2010–2011, 2014–2015); New York Knicks (2011–2014); Phoenix Suns (2015–2018); Los Angeles Lakers (2018–2019); Houston Rockets (2019–2020)	.5966	3,558	5,964
11	Mason Plumlee^	C	Brooklyn Nets (2013–2015); Portland Trail Blazers (2015–2017); Denver Nuggets (2017–2020); Detroit Pistons (2020–2021); Charlotte Hornets (2021–2023, 2025–2026); Los Angeles Clippers (2023–2024); Phoenix Suns (2024–2025); San Antonio Spurs (2026); Sacramento Kings (2026–present)	.5959	2,731	4,583
12	Zion Williamson^	PF	New Orleans Pelicans (2019–present)	.5911	2,625	4,441
13	Dwight Howard*	C	Orlando Magic (2004–2012); Los Angeles Lakers (2012–2013, 2019–2020, 2021–2022); Houston Rockets (2013–2016); Atlanta Hawks (2016–2017); Charlotte Hornets (2017–2018); Washington Wizards (2018–2019); Philadelphia 76ers (2020–2021)	.5868	7,051	12,016
14	Hassan Whiteside	C	Sacramento Kings (2010–2012, 2020–2021); Miami Heat (2014–2019); Portland Trail Blazers (2019–2020); Utah Jazz (2021–2022)	.5863	2,687	4,583
15	Steven Adams^	C	Oklahoma City Thunder (2013–2020); New Orleans Pelicans (2020–2021); Memphis Grizzlies (2021–2024); Houston Rockets (2024–present)	.5839	2,879	4,931
16	Shaquille O'Neal*	C	Orlando Magic (1992–1996); Los Angeles Lakers (1996–2004); Miami Heat (2004–2008); Phoenix Suns (2008–2009); Cleveland Cavaliers (2009–2010); Boston Celtics (2010–2011)	.5823	11,330	19,457
17	Mark West	C	Dallas Mavericks (1983–1984); Milwaukee Bucks (1984); Cleveland Cavaliers (1984–1988, 1996–1997); Phoenix Suns (1988–1994, 1999–2000); Detroit Pistons (1994–1996); Indiana Pacers (1997–1998); Atlanta Hawks (1999)	.5804	2,528	4,356
18	JaVale McGee	C	Washington Wizards (2008–2012); Denver Nuggets (2012–2015, 2021); Philadelphia 76ers (2015); Dallas Mavericks (2015–2016, 2022–2023); Golden State Warriors (2016–2018); Los Angeles Lakers (2018–2020); Cleveland Cavaliers (2020–2021); Phoenix Suns (2021–2022); Sacramento Kings (2023–present)	.5783	2,955	5,110
19	Steve Johnson	C	Kansas City Kings (1981–1984); Chicago Bulls (1984–1985); San Antonio Spurs (1985–1986); Portland Trail Blazers (1986–1989); Minnesota Timberwolves (1989–1990); Seattle SuperSonics (1990); Golden State Warriors (1990–1991)	.5722	2,841	4,965
20	Darryl Dawkins	C	Philadelphia 76ers (1975–1982); New Jersey Nets (1982–1987); Utah Jazz (1987); Detroit Pistons (1987–1989)	.5720	3,477	6,079
21	James Donaldson	C	Seattle SuperSonics (1980–1983); San Diego / Los Angeles Clippers (1983–1985); Dallas Mavericks (1985–1991); New York Knicks (1991–1992); Utah Jazz (1993, 1995)	.5706	3,105	5,442
22	Amir Johnson	PF	Detroit Pistons (2005–2009); Toronto Raptors (2009–2015); Boston Celtics (2015–2017); Philadelphia 76ers (2017–2019)	.5697	2,558	4,490
23	Bo Outlaw	PF	Los Angeles Clippers (1994–1997); Orlando Magic (1997–2001, 2005–2007); Phoenix Suns (2001–2003, 2004–2005); Memphis Grizzlies (2003–2004)	.5674	2,005	3,534
24	Jeff Ruland	C	Washington Bullets (1981–1986); Philadelphia 76ers (1986–1987, 1992); Detroit Pistons (1992–1993)	.5637	2,105	3,734
25	Jonas Valančiūnas^{†}	C	Toronto Raptors (2012–2019); Memphis Grizzlies (2019–2021); New Orleans Pelicans (2021–2024); Washington Wizards (2024–2025); Sacramento Kings (2025); Denver Nuggets (2025–2026)	.5612	5,123	9,129
26	Domantas Sabonis^	C/PF	Oklahoma City Thunder (2016–2017); Indiana Pacers (2017–2022); Sacramento Kings (2022–present)	.5605	4,255	7,592
27	Nikola Jokić^	C	Denver Nuggets (2015–present)	.5597	6,981	12,472
28	Kareem Abdul-Jabbar*	C	Milwaukee Bucks (1969–1975); Los Angeles Lakers (1975–1989)	.5595	15,837	28,307
29	Ben Simmons^	PG	Philadelphia 76ers (2016–2022); Brooklyn Nets (2022–2025); Los Angeles Clippers (2025)	.5581	2,076	3,720
30	Giannis Antetokounmpo^	PF	Milwaukee Bucks (2013–2026); Miami Heat (2026–present)	.5543	8,045	14,513
31	Kevin McHale*	PF	Boston Celtics (1980–1993)	.5538	6,830	12,334
32	Marcin Gortat	C	Orlando Magic (2007–2010); Phoenix Suns (2010–2013); Washington Wizards (2013–2018); Los Angeles Clippers (2018–2019)	.5514	3,401	6,168
33	Bobby Jones*	PF	Denver Nuggets (1976–1978); Philadelphia 76ers (1978–1986)	.5504	3,412	6,199
34	Buck Williams	PF	New Jersey Nets (1981–1989); Portland Trail Blazers (1989–1996); New York Knicks (1996–1998)	.5492	6,404	11,661
35	Nenê	C/PF	Denver Nuggets (2002–2012); Washington Wizards (2012–2016); Houston Rockets (2016–2020)	.5478	4,175	7,621
36	Enes Freedom	C	Utah Jazz (2011–2015); Oklahoma City Thunder (2015–2017); New York Knicks (2017–2019); Portland Trail Blazers (2019, 2020–2021); Boston Celtics (2019–2020, 2021–2022)	.5478	3,426	6,254
37	Evan Mobley^	PF	Cleveland Cavaliers (2021–present)	.5476	2,317	4,231
38	Kenneth Faried	PF	Denver Nuggets (2011–2018); Brooklyn Nets (2018–2019); Houston Rockets (2019)	.5463	2,190	4,009
39	Larry Nance	PF	Phoenix Suns (1981–1988); Cleveland Cavaliers (1988–1994)	.5461	6,370	11,664
40	Otis Thorpe	PF	Kansas City / Sacramento Kings (1984–1988, 1998); Houston Rockets (1988–1995); Portland Trail Blazers (1995); Detroit Pistons (1995–1997); Vancouver Grizzlies (1997–1998); Washington Wizards (1998–1999); Miami Heat (1999–2000); Charlotte Hornets (2000–2001)	.5457	6,872	12,593
41	Cedric Maxwell	SF	Boston Celtics (1977–1985); Los Angeles Clippers (1985–1987); Houston Rockets (1987–1988)	.5455	3,433	6,293
42	John Collins^	PF	Atlanta Hawks (2017–2023); Utah Jazz (2023–2025); Los Angeles Clippers (2025–2026); Detroit Pistons (2026–present)	.5449	3,350	6,148
43	Eddy Curry	C	Chicago Bulls (2001–2005); New York Knicks (2005–2011); Miami Heat (2011–2012); Dallas Mavericks (2012)	.5446	2,578	4,734
44	Chris Wilcox	PF/C	Los Angeles Clippers (2002–2006); Seattle SuperSonics / Oklahoma City Thunder (2006–2009); New York Knicks (2009); Detroit Pistons (2009–2011); Boston Celtics (2011–2013)	.5409	2,101	3,884
45	Charles Barkley*	PF	Philadelphia 76ers (1984–1992); Phoenix Suns (1992–1996); Houston Rockets (1996–2000)	.5405	8,435	15,605
46	Adrian Dantley*	SF	Buffalo Braves (1976–1977); Indiana Pacers (1977); Los Angeles Lakers (1977–1979); Utah Jazz (1979–1986); Detroit Pistons (1986–1989); Dallas Mavericks (1989–1990); Milwaukee Bucks (1991)	.5402	8,169	15,121
47	Wilt Chamberlain*	C	Philadelphia / San Francisco Warriors (1959–1965); Philadelphia 76ers (1965–1968); Los Angeles Lakers (1968–1973)	.5397	12,681	23,497
48	Gene Banks	SF/PF	San Antonio Spurs (1981–1985); Chicago Bulls (1985–1987)	.5388	2,134	3,961
49	Andre Drummond^	C	Detroit Pistons (2012–2020); Cleveland Cavaliers (2020–2021); Los Angeles Lakers (2021); Philadelphia 76ers (2021–2022, 2024–2026); Brooklyn Nets (2022); Chicago Bulls (2022–2024); New York Knicks (2026–present)	.5383	4,920	9,140
50	Swen Nater	C	Milwaukee Bucks (1976–1977); Buffalo Braves / San Diego Clippers (1977–1983); Los Angeles Lakers (1983–1984)	.5371	2,432	4,528

== Progressive list of field goal percentage leaders ==
This is a progressive list of field goal percentage leaders showing how the record has increased through the years.

^	Active NBA player
*	Inducted into the Naismith Memorial Basketball Hall of Fame

Statistics accurate as of November 15, 2026.

Team abbreviationsTeam(s) listed is the one player was on when he established the record.
ATL	Atlanta Hawks	DAL	Dallas Mavericks	MIA	Miami Heat	PHX	Phoenix Suns
BLB	Baltimore Bullets (1944–1954)	DEN	Denver Nuggets	MIL	Milwaukee Bucks	POR	Portland Trail Blazers
BAL	Baltimore Bullets (1963–1973)	DET	Detroit Pistons	MIN	Minnesota Timberwolves	ROC	Rochester Royals
BOS	Boston Celtics	FTW	Fort Wayne Pistons	MNL	Minneapolis Lakers	SAS	San Antonio Spurs
BKN	Brooklyn Nets	GSW	Golden State Warriors	NJN	New Jersey Nets	SFW	San Francisco Warriors
BUF	Buffalo Braves	HOU	Houston Rockets	NOP	New Orleans Pelicans	UTA	Utah Jazz
CHI	Chicago Bulls	IND	Indiana Pacers	NYK	New York Knicks	WAS	Washington Wizards
CHP	Chicago Packers	INO	Indianapolis Olympians	ORL	Orlando Magic	WSB	Washington Bullets
CIN	Cincinnati Royals	LAC	Los Angeles Clippers	PHI	Philadelphia 76ers	WSC	Washington Capitols
CLE	Cleveland Cavaliers	LAL	Los Angeles Lakers	PHW	Philadelphia Warriors		

Progressive field goal percentage leaders
Season	Year-by-year leader	FG%	Active player leader	FG%	Career record	FG%	Single-season record	FG%	Season
1946–47	Bob FeerickWSC	.4009	N/A		N/A		Bob FeerickWSC	.4009	1946–47
1947–48	Buddy Jeannette*BLB	.3488	N/A		N/A		Bob FeerickWSC	.4009	1947–48
1948–49	Arnie Risen*ROC	.4228	N/A		N/A		Arnie Risen*ROC	.4228	1948–49
1949–50	Alex GrozaINO	.4780	N/A		N/A		Alex GrozaINO	.4780	1949–50
1950–51	Alex GrozaINO	.4704	Joe Fulks*PHW	.2963	Joe Fulks*PHW	.2963	Alex GrozaINO	.4780	1950–51
1951–52	Paul Arizin*PHW	.4485	George Mikan*MNL	.4094	George Mikan*MNL	.4094	Alex GrozaINO	.4780	1951–52
1952–53	Neil Johnston*PHW	.4524	George Mikan*MNL	.4077	George Mikan*MNL	.4077	Alex GrozaINO	.4780	1952–53
1953–54	Ed Macauley*BOS	.4863	Ed Macauley*BOS	.4481	Ed Macauley*BOS	.4481	Ed Macauley*BOS	.4863	1953–54
1954–55	Larry FoustFTW	.4865	Ed Macauley*BOS	.4440	Ed Macauley*BOS	.4440	Larry FoustFTW	.4865	1954–55
1955–56	Neil Johnston*PHW	.4570	Neil Johnston*PHW	.4507	Neil Johnston*PHW	.4507	Larry FoustFTW	.4865	1955–56
1956–57	Neil Johnston*PHW	.4471	Neil Johnston*PHW	.4500	Neil Johnston*PHW	.4500	Larry FoustFTW	.4865	1956–57
1957–58	Jack Twyman*CIN	.4523	Neil Johnston*PHW	.4468	Neil Johnston*PHW	.4468	Larry FoustFTW	.4865	1957–58
1958–59	Kenny SearsNYK	.4900	Neil Johnston*PHW	.4442	Neil Johnston*PHW	.4442	Kenny SearsNYK	.4900	1958–59
1959–60	Kenny SearsNYK	.4774	Kenny SearsNYK	.4539	Kenny SearsNYK	.4539	Kenny SearsNYK	.4900	1959–60
1960–61	Wilt Chamberlain*PHW	.5092	Wilt Chamberlain*; PHW 1960–62; SFW 1962–63	.4857	Wilt Chamberlain*; PHW 1960–62; SFW 1962–63	.4857	Wilt Chamberlain*PHW	.5092	1960–61
1961–62	Walt Bellamy*CHP	.5189	Wilt Chamberlain*; PHW 1960–62; SFW 1962–63	.4936	Wilt Chamberlain*; PHW 1960–62; SFW 1962–63	.4936	Walt Bellamy*CHP	.5189	1961–62
1962–63	Wilt Chamberlain*SFW	.5282	Wilt Chamberlain*; PHW 1960–62; SFW 1962–63	.5026	Wilt Chamberlain*; PHW 1960–62; SFW 1962–63	.5026	Wilt Chamberlain*; SFW 1962–63; PHI 1965–67; LAL 1972–73	.5282	1962–63
1963–64	Jerry Lucas*CIN	.5266	Walt Bellamy*; BAL 1963–65; NYK 1965–66	.5194	Walt Bellamy*; BAL 1963–65; NYK 1965–66	.5194	Wilt Chamberlain*; SFW 1962–63; PHI 1965–67; LAL 1972–73	.5282	1963–64
1964–65	Wilt Chamberlain*; SFW 1964–65; PHI 1965–68; LAL 1968–69	.5103	Walt Bellamy*; BAL 1963–65; NYK 1965–66	.5170	Walt Bellamy*; BAL 1963–65; NYK 1965–66	.5170	Wilt Chamberlain*; SFW 1962–63; PHI 1965–67; LAL 1972–73	.5282	1964–65
1965–66	Wilt Chamberlain*; SFW 1964–65; PHI 1965–68; LAL 1968–69	.5397	Walt Bellamy*; BAL 1963–65; NYK 1965–66	.5151	Walt Bellamy*; BAL 1963–65; NYK 1965–66	.5151	Wilt Chamberlain*; SFW 1962–63; PHI 1965–67; LAL 1972–73	.5397	1965–66
1966–67	Wilt Chamberlain*; SFW 1964–65; PHI 1965–68; LAL 1968–69	.6826	Wilt Chamberlain*; PHI 1966–68; LAL 1968–70	.5216	Wilt Chamberlain*; PHI 1966–68; LAL 1968–70	.5216	Wilt Chamberlain*; SFW 1962–63; PHI 1965–67; LAL 1972–73	.6826	1966–67
1967–68	Wilt Chamberlain*; SFW 1964–65; PHI 1965–68; LAL 1968–69	.5948	Wilt Chamberlain*; PHI 1966–68; LAL 1968–70	.5267	Wilt Chamberlain*; PHI 1966–68; LAL 1968–70	.5267	Wilt Chamberlain*; SFW 1962–63; PHI 1965–67; LAL 1972–73	.6826	1967–68
1968–69	Wilt Chamberlain*; SFW 1964–65; PHI 1965–68; LAL 1968–69	.5833	Wilt Chamberlain*; PHI 1966–68; LAL 1968–70	.5297	Wilt Chamberlain*; PHI 1966–68; LAL 1968–70	.5297	Wilt Chamberlain*; SFW 1962–63; PHI 1965–67; LAL 1972–73	.6826	1968–69
1969–70	Johnny GreenCIN	.5593	Wilt Chamberlain*; PHI 1966–68; LAL 1968–70	.5301	Wilt Chamberlain*; PHI 1966–68; LAL 1968–70	.5301	Wilt Chamberlain*; SFW 1962–63; PHI 1965–67; LAL 1972–73	.6826	1969–70
1970–71	Johnny GreenCIN	.5871	Kareem Abdul-Jabbar*; MIL 1970–75; LAL 1975–78	.5478	Kareem Abdul-Jabbar*; MIL 1970–75; LAL 1975–78	.5478	Wilt Chamberlain*; SFW 1962–63; PHI 1965–67; LAL 1972–73	.6826	1970–71
1971–72	Wilt Chamberlain*LAL	.6492	Kareem Abdul-Jabbar*; MIL 1970–75; LAL 1975–78	.5571	Kareem Abdul-Jabbar*; MIL 1970–75; LAL 1975–78	.5571	Wilt Chamberlain*; SFW 1962–63; PHI 1965–67; LAL 1972–73	.6826	1971–72
1972–73	Wilt Chamberlain*LAL	.7270	Kareem Abdul-Jabbar*; MIL 1970–75; LAL 1975–78	.5564	Kareem Abdul-Jabbar*; MIL 1970–75; LAL 1975–78	.5564	Wilt Chamberlain*; SFW 1962–63; PHI 1965–67; LAL 1972–73	.7270	1972–73
1973–74	Bob McAdoo*BUF	.5471	Kareem Abdul-Jabbar*; MIL 1970–75; LAL 1975–78	.5531	Kareem Abdul-Jabbar*; MIL 1970–75; LAL 1975–78	.5531	Wilt Chamberlain*; SFW 1962–63; PHI 1965–67; LAL 1972–73	.7270	1973–74
1974–75	Don Nelson* (Note: Nelson was inducted into the Hall of Fame as a coach.)BOS	.5389	Kareem Abdul-Jabbar*; MIL 1970–75; LAL 1975–78	.5471	Kareem Abdul-Jabbar*; MIL 1970–75; LAL 1975–78	.5471	Wilt Chamberlain*; SFW 1962–63; PHI 1965–67; LAL 1972–73	.7270	1974–75
1975–76	Wes Unseld*WSB	.5608	Kareem Abdul-Jabbar*; MIL 1970–75; LAL 1975–78	.5446	Kareem Abdul-Jabbar*; MIL 1970–75; LAL 1975–78	.5446	Wilt Chamberlain*; SFW 1962–63; PHI 1965–67; LAL 1972–73	.7270	1975–76
1976–77	Kareem Abdul-Jabbar*LAL	.5793	Kareem Abdul-Jabbar*; MIL 1970–75; LAL 1975–78	.5484	Kareem Abdul-Jabbar*; MIL 1970–75; LAL 1975–78	.5484	Wilt Chamberlain*; SFW 1962–63; PHI 1965–67; LAL 1972–73	.7270	1976–77
1977–78	Bobby Jones*DEN	.5782	Kareem Abdul-Jabbar*; MIL 1970–75; LAL 1975–78	.5485	Kareem Abdul-Jabbar*; MIL 1970–75; LAL 1975–78	.5485	Wilt Chamberlain*; SFW 1962–63; PHI 1965–67; LAL 1972–73	.7270	1977–78
1978–79	Cedric MaxwellBOS	.5842	Artis Gilmore*; CHI 1978–82; SAS 1982–87; CHI 1987; BOS 1988	.5537	Artis Gilmore*; CHI 1978–82; SAS 1982–87; CHI 1987; BOS 1988	.5537	Wilt Chamberlain*; SFW 1962–63; PHI 1965–67; LAL 1972–73	.7270	1978–79
1979–80	Cedric MaxwellBOS	.6093	Artis Gilmore*; CHI 1978–82; SAS 1982–87; CHI 1987; BOS 1988	.5587	Artis Gilmore*; CHI 1978–82; SAS 1982–87; CHI 1987; BOS 1988	.5587	Wilt Chamberlain*; SFW 1962–63; PHI 1965–67; LAL 1972–73	.7270	1979–80
1980–81	Artis Gilmore*; CHI 1980–82; SAS 1982–84	.6703	Artis Gilmore*; CHI 1978–82; SAS 1982–87; CHI 1987; BOS 1988	.5769	Artis Gilmore*; CHI 1978–82; SAS 1982–87; CHI 1987; BOS 1988	.5769	Wilt Chamberlain*; SFW 1962–63; PHI 1965–67; LAL 1972–73	.7270	1980–81
1981–82	Artis Gilmore*; CHI 1980–82; SAS 1982–84	.6523	Artis Gilmore*; CHI 1978–82; SAS 1982–87; CHI 1987; BOS 1988	.5878	Artis Gilmore*; CHI 1978–82; SAS 1982–87; CHI 1987; BOS 1988	.5878	Wilt Chamberlain*; SFW 1962–63; PHI 1965–67; LAL 1972–73	.7270	1981–82
1982–83	Artis Gilmore*; CHI 1980–82; SAS 1982–84	.6261	Artis Gilmore*; CHI 1978–82; SAS 1982–87; CHI 1987; BOS 1988	.5928	Artis Gilmore*; CHI 1978–82; SAS 1982–87; CHI 1987; BOS 1988	.5928	Wilt Chamberlain*; SFW 1962–63; PHI 1965–67; LAL 1972–73	.7270	1982–83
1983–84	Artis Gilmore*; CHI 1980–82; SAS 1982–84	.6313	Artis Gilmore*; CHI 1978–82; SAS 1982–87; CHI 1987; BOS 1988	.5958	Artis Gilmore*; CHI 1978–82; SAS 1982–87; CHI 1987; BOS 1988	.5958	Wilt Chamberlain*; SFW 1962–63; PHI 1965–67; LAL 1972–73	.7270	1983–84
1984–85	James DonaldsonLAC	.6370	Artis Gilmore*; CHI 1978–82; SAS 1982–87; CHI 1987; BOS 1988	.5987	Artis Gilmore*; CHI 1978–82; SAS 1982–87; CHI 1987; BOS 1988	.5987	Wilt Chamberlain*; SFW 1962–63; PHI 1965–67; LAL 1972–73	.7270	1984–85
1985–86	Steve JohnsonSAS	.6318	Artis Gilmore*; CHI 1978–82; SAS 1982–87; CHI 1987; BOS 1988	.6002	Artis Gilmore*; CHI 1978–82; SAS 1982–87; CHI 1987; BOS 1988	.6002	Wilt Chamberlain*; SFW 1962–63; PHI 1965–67; LAL 1972–73	.7270	1985–86
1986–87	Kevin McHale*BOS	.6044	Artis Gilmore*; CHI 1978–82; SAS 1982–87; CHI 1987; BOS 1988	.6000	Artis Gilmore*; CHI 1978–82; SAS 1982–87; CHI 1987; BOS 1988	.6000	Wilt Chamberlain*; SFW 1962–63; PHI 1965–67; LAL 1972–73	.7270	1986–87
1987–88	Kevin McHale*BOS	.6037	Artis Gilmore*; CHI 1978–82; SAS 1982–87; CHI 1987; BOS 1988	.5990	Artis Gilmore*; CHI 1978–82; SAS 1982–87; CHI 1987; BOS 1988	.5990	Wilt Chamberlain*; SFW 1962–63; PHI 1965–67; LAL 1972–73	.7270	1987–88
1988–89	Dennis Rodman*DET	.5951	James DonaldsonDAL	.5868	Artis Gilmore*; CHI 1978–82; SAS 1982–87; CHI 1987; BOS 1988	.5990	Wilt Chamberlain*; SFW 1962–63; PHI 1965–67; LAL 1972–73	.7270	1988–89
1989–90	Mark WestPHX	.6245	James DonaldsonDAL	.5817	Artis Gilmore*; CHI 1978–82; SAS 1982–87; CHI 1987; BOS 1988	.5990	Wilt Chamberlain*; SFW 1962–63; PHI 1965–67; LAL 1972–73	.7270	1989–90
1990–91	Buck WilliamsPOR	.6017	Charles Barkley*PHI	.5796	Artis Gilmore*; CHI 1978–82; SAS 1982–87; CHI 1987; BOS 1988	.5990	Wilt Chamberlain*; SFW 1962–63; PHI 1965–67; LAL 1972–73	.7270	1990–91
1991–92	Buck WilliamsPOR	.6039	Charles Barkley*PHI	.5761	Artis Gilmore*; CHI 1978–82; SAS 1982–87; CHI 1987; BOS 1988	.5990	Wilt Chamberlain*; SFW 1962–63; PHI 1965–67; LAL 1972–73	.7270	1991–92
1992–93	Cedric CeballosPHX	.5755	James DonaldsonUTA	.5702	Artis Gilmore*; CHI 1978–82; SAS 1982–87; CHI 1987; BOS 1988	.5990	Wilt Chamberlain*; SFW 1962–63; PHI 1965–67; LAL 1972–73	.7270	1992–93
1993–94	Shaquille O'Neal*ORL	.5990	Mark West; PHX 1993–94; DET 1994–96; CLE 1996–97; IND 1997–98; ATL 1999; PHX 1999–2000	.5922	Artis Gilmore*; CHI 1978–82; SAS 1982–87; CHI 1987; BOS 1988	.5990	Wilt Chamberlain*; SFW 1962–63; PHI 1965–67; LAL 1972–73	.7270	1993–94
1994–95	Chris GatlingGSW	.6328	Mark West; PHX 1993–94; DET 1994–96; CLE 1996–97; IND 1997–98; ATL 1999; PHX 1999–2000	.5887	Artis Gilmore*; CHI 1978–82; SAS 1982–87; CHI 1987; BOS 1988	.5990	Wilt Chamberlain*; SFW 1962–63; PHI 1965–67; LAL 1972–73	.7270	1994–95
1995–96	Gheorghe MureșanWSB	.5840	Mark West; PHX 1993–94; DET 1994–96; CLE 1996–97; IND 1997–98; ATL 1999; PHX 1999–2000	.5855	Artis Gilmore*; CHI 1978–82; SAS 1982–87; CHI 1987; BOS 1988	.5990	Wilt Chamberlain*; SFW 1962–63; PHI 1965–67; LAL 1972–73	.7270	1995–96
1996–97	Gheorghe MureșanWSB	.6044	Mark West; PHX 1993–94; DET 1994–96; CLE 1996–97; IND 1997–98; ATL 1999; PHX 1999–2000	.5842	Artis Gilmore*; CHI 1978–82; SAS 1982–87; CHI 1987; BOS 1988	.5990	Wilt Chamberlain*; SFW 1962–63; PHI 1965–67; LAL 1972–73	.7270	1996–97
1997–98	Shaquille O'Neal*LAL	.5841	Mark West; PHX 1993–94; DET 1994–96; CLE 1996–97; IND 1997–98; ATL 1999; PHX 1999–2000	.5837	Artis Gilmore*; CHI 1978–82; SAS 1982–87; CHI 1987; BOS 1988	.5990	Wilt Chamberlain*; SFW 1962–63; PHI 1965–67; LAL 1972–73	.7270	1997–98
1998–99	Shaquille O'Neal*LAL	.5763	Mark West; PHX 1993–94; DET 1994–96; CLE 1996–97; IND 1997–98; ATL 1999; PHX 1999–2000	.5808	Artis Gilmore*; CHI 1978–82; SAS 1982–87; CHI 1987; BOS 1988	.5990	Wilt Chamberlain*; SFW 1962–63; PHI 1965–67; LAL 1972–73	.7270	1998–99
1999–00	Shaquille O'Neal*LAL	.5742	Mark West; PHX 1993–94; DET 1994–96; CLE 1996–97; IND 1997–98; ATL 1999; PHX 1999–2000	.5804	Artis Gilmore*; CHI 1978–82; SAS 1982–87; CHI 1987; BOS 1988	.5990	Wilt Chamberlain*; SFW 1962–63; PHI 1965–67; LAL 1972–73	.7270	1999–00
2000–01	Shaquille O'Neal*LAL	.5717	Shaquille O'Neal*; LAL 2000–04; MIA 2004–08; PHX 2008–09; CLE 2009–10; BOS 2010–11	.5768	Artis Gilmore*; CHI 1978–82; SAS 1982–87; CHI 1987; BOS 1988	.5990	Wilt Chamberlain*; SFW 1962–63; PHI 1965–67; LAL 1972–73	.7270	2000–01
2001–02	Shaquille O'Neal*LAL	.5793	Shaquille O'Neal*; LAL 2000–04; MIA 2004–08; PHX 2008–09; CLE 2009–10; BOS 2010–11	.5770	Artis Gilmore*; CHI 1978–82; SAS 1982–87; CHI 1987; BOS 1988	.5990	Wilt Chamberlain*; SFW 1962–63; PHI 1965–67; LAL 1972–73	.7270	2001–02
2002–03	Eddy CurryCHI	.5846	Shaquille O'Neal*; LAL 2000–04; MIA 2004–08; PHX 2008–09; CLE 2009–10; BOS 2010–11	.5767	Artis Gilmore*; CHI 1978–82; SAS 1982–87; CHI 1987; BOS 1988	.5990	Wilt Chamberlain*; SFW 1962–63; PHI 1965–67; LAL 1972–73	.7270	2002–03
2003–04	Shaquille O'Neal*; LAL 2003–04; MIA 2004–06	.5844	Shaquille O'Neal*; LAL 2000–04; MIA 2004–08; PHX 2008–09; CLE 2009–10; BOS 2010–11	.5772	Artis Gilmore*; CHI 1978–82; SAS 1982–87; CHI 1987; BOS 1988	.5990	Wilt Chamberlain*; SFW 1962–63; PHI 1965–67; LAL 1972–73	.7270	2003–04
2004–05	Shaquille O'Neal*; LAL 2003–04; MIA 2004–06	.6009	Shaquille O'Neal*; LAL 2000–04; MIA 2004–08; PHX 2008–09; CLE 2009–10; BOS 2010–11	.5788	Artis Gilmore*; CHI 1978–82; SAS 1982–87; CHI 1987; BOS 1988	.5990	Wilt Chamberlain*; SFW 1962–63; PHI 1965–67; LAL 1972–73	.7270	2004–05
2005–06	Shaquille O'Neal*; LAL 2003–04; MIA 2004–06	.6000	Shaquille O'Neal*; LAL 2000–04; MIA 2004–08; PHX 2008–09; CLE 2009–10; BOS 2010–11	.5798	Artis Gilmore*; CHI 1978–82; SAS 1982–87; CHI 1987; BOS 1988	.5990	Wilt Chamberlain*; SFW 1962–63; PHI 1965–67; LAL 1972–73	.7270	2005–06
2006–07	Mikki MooreNJN	.6087	Shaquille O'Neal*; LAL 2000–04; MIA 2004–08; PHX 2008–09; CLE 2009–10; BOS 2010–11	.5801	Artis Gilmore*; CHI 1978–82; SAS 1982–87; CHI 1987; BOS 1988	.5990	Wilt Chamberlain*; SFW 1962–63; PHI 1965–67; LAL 1972–73	.7270	2006–07
2007–08	Andris BiedriņšGSW	.6261	Shaquille O'Neal*; LAL 2000–04; MIA 2004–08; PHX 2008–09; CLE 2009–10; BOS 2010–11	.5806	Artis Gilmore*; CHI 1978–82; SAS 1982–87; CHI 1987; BOS 1988	.5990	Wilt Chamberlain*; SFW 1962–63; PHI 1965–67; LAL 1972–73	.7270	2007–08
2008–09	Shaquille O'Neal*PHX	.6088	Shaquille O'Neal*; LAL 2000–04; MIA 2004–08; PHX 2008–09; CLE 2009–10; BOS 2010–11	.5818	Artis Gilmore*; CHI 1978–82; SAS 1982–87; CHI 1987; BOS 1988	.5990	Wilt Chamberlain*; SFW 1962–63; PHI 1965–67; LAL 1972–73	.7270	2008–09
2009–10	Dwight Howard*ORL	.6115	Shaquille O'Neal*; LAL 2000–04; MIA 2004–08; PHX 2008–09; CLE 2009–10; BOS 2010–11	.5814	Artis Gilmore*; CHI 1978–82; SAS 1982–87; CHI 1987; BOS 1988	.5990	Wilt Chamberlain*; SFW 1962–63; PHI 1965–67; LAL 1972–73	.7270	2009–10
2010–11	NenêDEN	.6147	Shaquille O'Neal*; LAL 2000–04; MIA 2004–08; PHX 2008–09; CLE 2009–10; BOS 2010–11	.5823	Artis Gilmore*; CHI 1978–82; SAS 1982–87; CHI 1987; BOS 1988	.5990	Wilt Chamberlain*; SFW 1962–63; PHI 1965–67; LAL 1972–73	.7270	2010–11
2011–12	Tyson ChandlerNYK	.6789	Tyson Chandler; NYK 2011–14; DAL 2014–15	.5781	Artis Gilmore*; CHI 1978–82; SAS 1982–87; CHI 1987; BOS 1988	.5990	Wilt Chamberlain*; SFW 1962–63; PHI 1965–67; LAL 1972–73	.7270	2011–12
2012–13	DeAndre Jordan^LAC	.6434	Tyson Chandler; NYK 2011–14; DAL 2014–15	.5836	Artis Gilmore*; CHI 1978–82; SAS 1982–87; CHI 1987; BOS 1988	.5990	Wilt Chamberlain*; SFW 1962–63; PHI 1965–67; LAL 1972–73	.7270	2012–13
2013–14	DeAndre Jordan^LAC	.6757	Tyson Chandler; NYK 2011–14; DAL 2014–15	.5842	Artis Gilmore*; CHI 1978–82; SAS 1982–87; CHI 1987; BOS 1988	.5990	Wilt Chamberlain*; SFW 1962–63; PHI 1965–67; LAL 1972–73	.7270	2013–14
2014–15	DeAndre Jordan^LAC	.7097	Tyson Chandler; NYK 2011–14; DAL 2014–15	.5913	Artis Gilmore*; CHI 1978–82; SAS 1982–87; CHI 1987; BOS 1988	.5990	Wilt Chamberlain*; SFW 1962–63; PHI 1965–67; LAL 1972–73	.7270	2014–15
2015–16	DeAndre Jordan^LAC	.7028	DeAndre Jordan^ LAC 2015–18; DAL 2018–19; NYK 2019; BKN 2019–21; LAL 2021–22; PHI 2022; DEN 2022–25; NOP 2025–	.6700	DeAndre Jordan^ LAC 2015–18; DAL 2018–19; NYK 2019; BKN 2019–21; LAL 2021–22; PHI 2022; DEN 2022–25; NOP 2025–	.6700	Wilt Chamberlain*; SFW 1962–63; PHI 1965–67; LAL 1972–73	.7270	2015–16
2016–17	DeAndre Jordan^LAC	.7140	DeAndre Jordan^ LAC 2015–18; DAL 2018–19; NYK 2019; BKN 2019–21; LAL 2021–22; PHI 2022; DEN 2022–25; NOP 2025–	.6769	DeAndre Jordan^ LAC 2015–18; DAL 2018–19; NYK 2019; BKN 2019–21; LAL 2021–22; PHI 2022; DEN 2022–25; NOP 2025–	.6769	Wilt Chamberlain*; SFW 1962–63; PHI 1965–67; LAL 1972–73	.7270	2016–17
2017–18	Clint Capela^HOU	.6524	DeAndre Jordan^ LAC 2015–18; DAL 2018–19; NYK 2019; BKN 2019–21; LAL 2021–22; PHI 2022; DEN 2022–25; NOP 2025–	.6726	DeAndre Jordan^ LAC 2015–18; DAL 2018–19; NYK 2019; BKN 2019–21; LAL 2021–22; PHI 2022; DEN 2022–25; NOP 2025–	.6726	Wilt Chamberlain*; SFW 1962–63; PHI 1965–67; LAL 1972–73	.7270	2017–18
2018–19	Rudy Gobert^UTA	.6685	DeAndre Jordan^ LAC 2015–18; DAL 2018–19; NYK 2019; BKN 2019–21; LAL 2021–22; PHI 2022; DEN 2022–25; NOP 2025–	.6696	DeAndre Jordan^ LAC 2015–18; DAL 2018–19; NYK 2019; BKN 2019–21; LAL 2021–22; PHI 2022; DEN 2022–25; NOP 2025–	.6696	Wilt Chamberlain*; SFW 1962–63; PHI 1965–67; LAL 1972–73	.7270	2018–19
2019–20	Mitchell Robinson^NYK	.7419	DeAndre Jordan^ LAC 2015–18; DAL 2018–19; NYK 2019; BKN 2019–21; LAL 2021–22; PHI 2022; DEN 2022–25; NOP 2025–	.6694	DeAndre Jordan^ LAC 2015–18; DAL 2018–19; NYK 2019; BKN 2019–21; LAL 2021–22; PHI 2022; DEN 2022–25; NOP 2025–	.6694	Mitchell Robinson^NYK	.7419	2019–20
2020–21	Rudy Gobert^UTA	.6753	DeAndre Jordan^ LAC 2015–18; DAL 2018–19; NYK 2019; BKN 2019–21; LAL 2021–22; PHI 2022; DEN 2022–25; NOP 2025–	.6739	DeAndre Jordan^ LAC 2015–18; DAL 2018–19; NYK 2019; BKN 2019–21; LAL 2021–22; PHI 2022; DEN 2022–25; NOP 2025–	.6739	Mitchell Robinson^NYK	.7419	2020–21
2021–22	Rudy Gobert^UTA	.7126	DeAndre Jordan^ LAC 2015–18; DAL 2018–19; NYK 2019; BKN 2019–21; LAL 2021–22; PHI 2022; DEN 2022–25; NOP 2025–	.6731	DeAndre Jordan^ LAC 2015–18; DAL 2018–19; NYK 2019; BKN 2019–21; LAL 2021–22; PHI 2022; DEN 2022–25; NOP 2025–	.6731	Mitchell Robinson^NYK	.7419	2021–22
2022–23	Nic Claxton^BKN	.7053	DeAndre Jordan^ LAC 2015–18; DAL 2018–19; NYK 2019; BKN 2019–21; LAL 2021–22; PHI 2022; DEN 2022–25; NOP 2025–	.6750	DeAndre Jordan^ LAC 2015–18; DAL 2018–19; NYK 2019; BKN 2019–21; LAL 2021–22; PHI 2022; DEN 2022–25; NOP 2025–	.6750	Mitchell Robinson^NYK	.7419	2022–23
2023–24	Daniel Gafford^WAS & DAL	.7150	DeAndre Jordan^ LAC 2015–18; DAL 2018–19; NYK 2019; BKN 2019–21; LAL 2021–22; PHI 2022; DEN 2022–25; NOP 2025–	.6741	DeAndre Jordan^ LAC 2015–18; DAL 2018–19; NYK 2019; BKN 2019–21; LAL 2021–22; PHI 2022; DEN 2022–25; NOP 2025–	.6741	Mitchell Robinson^NYK	.7419	2023–24
2024–25	Jarrett Allen^CLE	.7063	DeAndre Jordan^ LAC 2015–18; DAL 2018–19; NYK 2019; BKN 2019–21; LAL 2021–22; PHI 2022; DEN 2022–25; NOP 2025–	.6735	DeAndre Jordan^ LAC 2015–18; DAL 2018–19; NYK 2019; BKN 2019–21; LAL 2021–22; PHI 2022; DEN 2022–25; NOP 2025–	.6735	Mitchell Robinson^NYK	.7419	2024–25
2025–26	Rudy Gobert^MIN	.6823	DeAndre Jordan^ LAC 2015–18; DAL 2018–19; NYK 2019; BKN 2019–21; LAL 2021–22; PHI 2022; DEN 2022–25; NOP 2025–	.6734	DeAndre Jordan^ LAC 2015–18; DAL 2018–19; NYK 2019; BKN 2019–21; LAL 2021–22; PHI 2022; DEN 2022–25; NOP 2025–	.6734	Mitchell Robinson^NYK	.7419	2025–26
2026–27	Walker Kessler^LAL	.6800	DeAndre Jordan^ LAC 2015–18; DAL 2018–19; NYK 2019; BKN 2019–21; LAL 2021–22; PHI 2022; DEN 2022–25; NOP 2025–	.6737	DeAndre Jordan^ LAC 2015–18; DAL 2018–19; NYK 2019; BKN 2019–21; LAL 2021–22; PHI 2022; DEN 2022–25; NOP 2025–	.6737	Mitchell Robinson^NYK	.7419	2026–27
Season	Year-by-year leader	FG%	Active player leader	FG%	Career record	FG%	Single-season record	FG%	Season

== See also ==
- NBA records
- List of NBA annual field goal percentage leaders
- List of NBA career 3-point field goal percentage leaders
