= Marty Passaglia =

American basketball player

Personal information
- Born: April 22, 1919 Gate, Washington, U.S.
- Died: July 17, 2004 (aged 85) Capay, California, U.S.
- Listed height: 6 ft 1 in (1.85 m)
- Listed weight: 170 lb (77 kg)

Career information
- High school: Galileo (San Francisco, California)
- College: Santa Clara (1938–1941)
- Playing career: 1946–1949
- Position: Guard
- Number: 4, 55

Career history
- 1946–1947: Washington Capitols
- 1947–1948: St. Paul Saints
- 1948–1949: Indianapolis Jets
- Stats at NBA.com
- Stats at Basketball Reference

Martin Harold Passaglia (April 22, 1919 – July 17, 2004) was an American professional basketball player. He spent two seasons in the Basketball Association of America (BAA) as a member of the Washington Capitols (1946–47) and the Indianapolis Jets (1948–49). He attended Santa Clara University, where he is a member of the school's sports hall of fame.

== BAA career statistics ==
Legend
GP	Games played	FG%	Field-goal percentage
FT%	Free-throw percentage	APG	Assists per game
PPG	Points per game	**Bold**	Career high

=== Regular season ===
Year	Team	GP	FG%	FT%	APG	PPG
1946–47	Washington	**43**	**.231**	.563	.2	2.8
1948–49	Indianapolis	10	.246	**.750**	**1.7**	**3.1**
Career		53	.234	.583	.5	2.8

=== Playoffs ===
Year	Team	GP	FG%	FT%	APG	PPG
1946–47	Washington	6	.143	.333	.0	.8
Career		6	.143	.333	.0	.8
