= Gene Gallette =

American basketball player (1919–1976)

Personal information
- Born: February 22, 1919 San Francisco, California
- Died: November 29, 1976 (aged 57) San Francisco, California
- Listed height: 6 ft 2 in (1.88 m)
- Listed weight: 205 lb (93 kg)

Career information
- High school: Galileo (San Francisco, California)
- Playing career: 1946–1947
- Position: Forward
- Number: 19

Career history
- 1946–1947: Washington Capitols
- Stats at NBA.com
- Stats at Basketball Reference

Eugene Henry Gallette (February 22, 1919 - November 19, 1976) was a professional basketball player. He spent one season in the Basketball Association of America (BAA) as a member of the Washington Capitols during the 1946–47 season.

His name is still listed as "Gillette" in some basketball encyclopedias, but that is an error that has been carried over for many years.

== BAA career statistics ==
Legend
| GP | Games played |
| FG% | Field-goal percentage |
| FT% | Free-throw percentage |
| APG | Assists per game |
| PPG | Points per game |

=== Regular season ===
| Year | Team | GP | FG% | FT% | APG | PPG |
|---|---|---|---|---|---|---|
| 1946–47 | Washington | 14 | .091 | .667 | .1 | .6 |
| Career | | 14 | .091 | .667 | .1 | .6 |
