= Johnny Norlander =

American basketball player

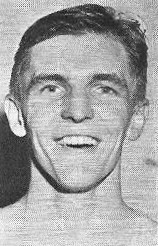
- Norlander circa 1949

Personal information
- Born: March 5, 1921 Virginia, Minnesota, U.S.
- Died: March 6, 2002 (aged 81) Virginia, Minnesota, U.S.
- Listed height: 6 ft 3 in (1.91 m)
- Listed weight: 180 lb (82 kg)

Career information
- High school: Roosevelt (Virginia, Minnesota)
- College: Hamline (1940–1943)
- Position: Forward
- Number: 16

Career history
- 1945–1946: Baltimore Bullets
- 1946–1950: Washington Capitols
- 1951: York Victory A.C.

Career highlights
- ABL champion (1946); All-EPBL Second Team (1951)
- Stats at NBA.com
- Stats at Basketball Reference

John Arthur Norlander (March 5, 1921 – March 6, 2002) was an American professional basketball player born in Virginia, Minnesota.

A 6'3" forward from Hamline University, where he joined Theta Chi fraternity, Norlander played five seasons (1946–1951) in the Basketball Association of America and National Basketball Association as a member of the Washington Capitols. He averaged 8.3 points per game in his BAA/NBA career. Norlander played in the Eastern Professional Basketball League (EPBL) for York Victory A.C. during the 1950–51 season and was named to the All-EPBL Second Team. He died one day after his 81st birthday in 2002.

== BAA/NBA career statistics ==
Legend
GP	Games played	FG%	Field-goal percentage
FT%	Free-throw percentage	RPG	Rebounds per game
APG	Assists per game	PPG	Points per game
**Bold**	Career high

=== Regular season ===
Year	Team	GP	FG%	FT%	RPG	APG	PPG
1946–47	Washington	**60**	.319	.652	–	.8	**10.4**
1947–48	Washington	48	.308	**.742**	–	.9	9.8
1948–49	Washington	**60**	.361	.678	–	**1.4**	7.4
1949–50	Washington	40	.338	.624	–	.8	6.3
1950–51	Washington	9	**.375**	.643	**1.0**	.6	2.3
Career		217	.329	.677	1.0	1.0	8.3

=== Playoffs ===
Year	Team	GP	FG%	FT%	RPG	APG	PPG
1947	Washington	6	.280	.765	–	.3	**6.8**
1949	Washington	**11**	**.342**	**.769**	–	**.6**	6.4
Career		17	.317	.767	–	.5	6.5
