= Bob Gantt =

American basketball player (1922–1994)

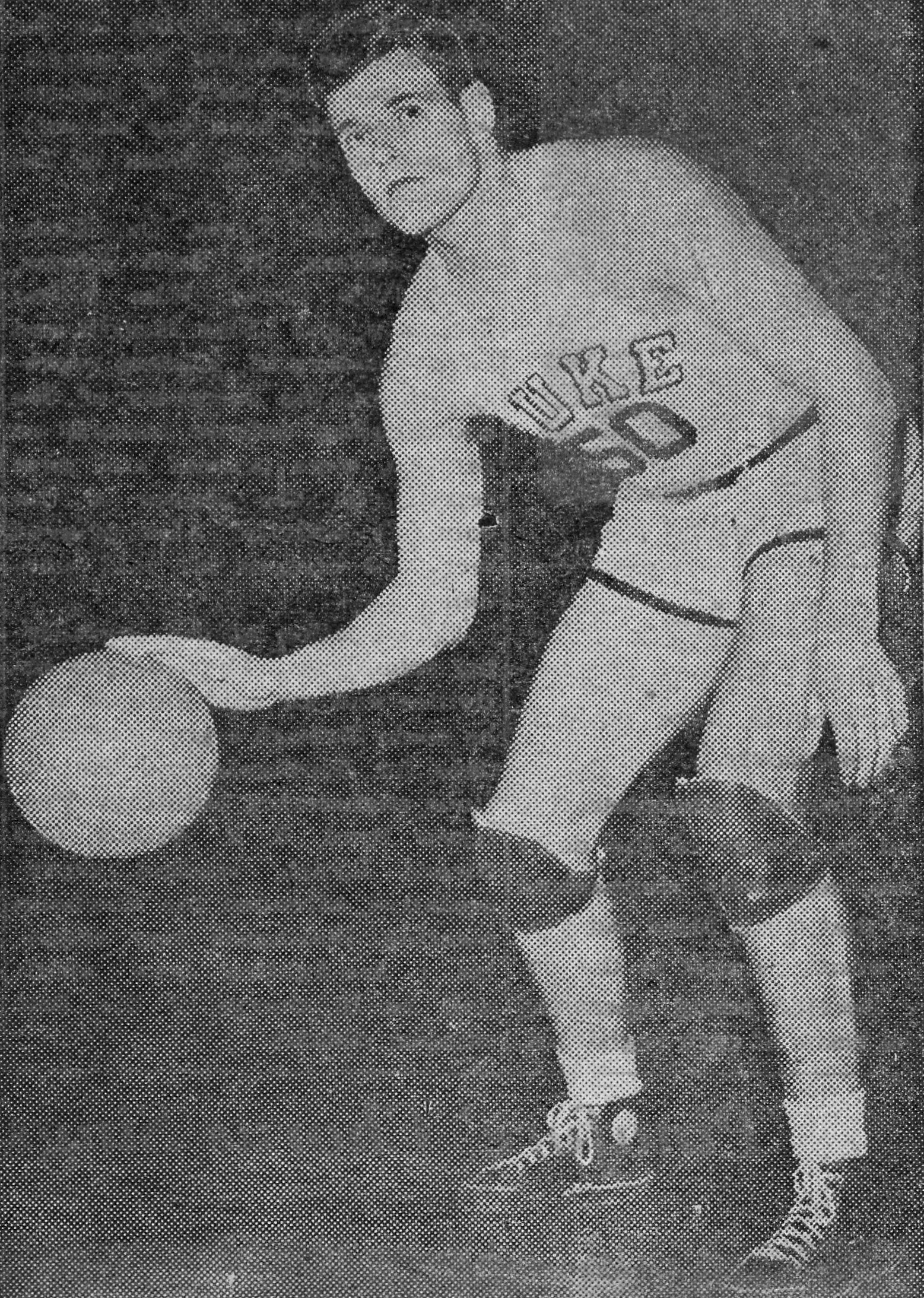
- Gantt with Duke in 1942

Personal information
- Born: June 22, 1922 Durham, North Carolina, U.S.
- Died: October 25, 1994 (aged 72) Waynesville, North Carolina, U.S.
- Listed height: 6 ft 4 in (1.93 m)
- Listed weight: 205 lb (93 kg)

Career information
- High school: Durham
- College: Duke (1941–1944)
- Playing career: 1946–1947
- Position: Forward / center

Career history
- 1946–1947: Washington Capitols

Career highlights
- All-SoCon (1943); 2× Second-team All-American (1942, 1943)
- Stats at NBA.com
- Stats at Basketball Reference

Robert Melvin Gantt Jr. (June 22, 1922 – October 25, 1994) was an American professional basketball player. He played for one season with the Washington Capitols of the Basketball Association of America during the 1946–47 season. Gantt played college basketball for Duke University. He is a member of the North Carolina Sports Hall of Fame.

== BAA career statistics ==
Legend
GP	Games played
FG%	Field-goal percentage
FT%	Free-throw percentage
APG	Assists per game
PPG	Points per game

=== Regular season ===
Year	Team	GP	FG%	FT%	APG	PPG
1946–47	Washington	23	.326	.464	.2	3.1
Career		23	.326	.464	.2	3.1

=== Playoffs ===
Year	Team	GP	FG%	FT%	APG	PPG
1946–47	Washington	2	.333	.000	.0	1.0
Career		2	.333	.000	.0	1.0
