= Roger Boas =

American politician and child sex offender (1921–2017)

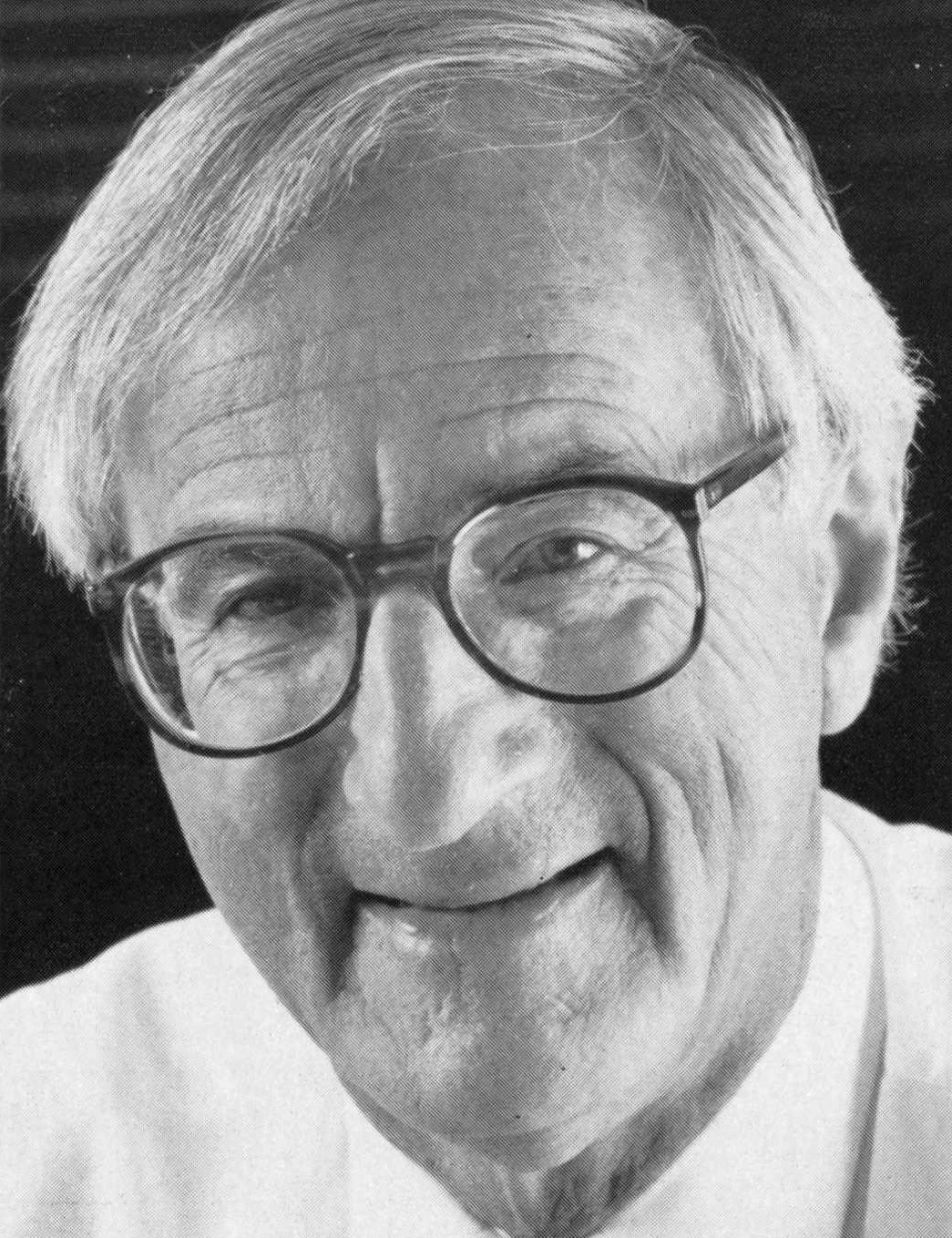
- Boas in 1987

Chief Administrative Officer of San Francisco
- In office January 3, 1977 – December 31, 1986
- Preceded by: Thomas Mellon
- Succeeded by: Rudy Nothenberg

Member of the San Francisco Board of Supervisors for the at-large district
- In office January 8, 1962 – February 20, 1973

Personal details
- Born: August 21, 1921 San Francisco, California, U.S.
- Died: February 10, 2017 (aged 95) San Francisco, California, U.S.
- Party: Democratic
- Profession: Businessman; politician

John Roger Boas (August 21, 1921 – February 10, 2017) was an American businessman, politician, and child sex offender. He was a member of the Democratic Party in northern California and served as the Chief Administrative Officer of San Francisco from 1977 to 1986.

== Biography ==
Boas was born August 21, 1921, in San Francisco. He was the son of Benjamin Boas, a finance company executive of German descent, and Laurie Kline Boas. He went to a few public schools in San Francisco, including Grant Grammar School and Galileo High School, and graduated from Stanford University. Boas joined the army and served in Europe during World War II, where he was awarded the Bronze Star Medal for "meritorious service" in connection with military operations against an armed enemy of the United States, on August 8–9, 1944, near Caudan, France. He also received the Silver Star for "gallantry in action" and five battle stars. He was a member of the 94th Field Artillery Battalion, 4th Armored Division and served as the battalion adjutant.

In 1950, he went to work at his father's Pontiac dealership, Boas Motor and took over as owner in 1965.

In 1958, together with the future Mayor and US Senator Dianne Feinstein and Ron Pelosi, Boas was a key figure in the 1958 campaign that elected Clair Engle to the US Senate. Four years later, Boas was himself elected to the San Francisco Board of Supervisors, on which he served until 1973. An avowed liberal, he was quoted in 1968 (when he also chaired the California Democratic Party) as discouraging the influx of "Summer of Love" young people into the city:

My advice to kids around the country is not to come here. There must be hippie havens other than San Francisco.

In 1963, Boas began the weekly TV program, World Press, a round table discussion examining news from the US and abroad, with a panel of seventeen experts. World Press was the first national network program originating in San Francisco and was broadcast on 185 stations.

After running unsuccessfully for Congress in 1972 against the Republican incumbent William S. Mailliard, Boas became Chief Administrative Officer of San Francisco under mayors George Moscone and Dianne Feinstein from 1977 to 1986. Boas' duties included overseeing a workforce of 2,500 in departments and special projects with combined operating budgets of about $200 million and capital budgets of about $1.8 million. His responsibilities included overseeing San Francisco's sewer system and garbage collection, and one of his biggest accomplishments was in 1980 with the Solid Waste Program, a long-term program for managing the city's solid waste. This included "reducing waste at the source, separating waste for reuse, continuing mass collection, processing and converting waste to energy, and finding a landfill site for sanitary disposal of wastes that could be converted or recycled". He also oversaw the development of convention facilities, including the Yerba Buena Center for the Arts and the long-delayed $128.3 million Moscone Center, built in 1981. The action by the Board of Supervisors in approving the construction of the busiest convention center in the country was "a triumph for San Francisco" and one of Boas' greatest achievements.

His political achievements also include leading the South of Market revitalization and spearheading the BART link to San Francisco International Airport. In the 1980s, he produced a report discussing infrastructure, in which he correctly predicted that "unless the aging undersurface infrastructure is dealt with properly, such street problems would reoccur at an ever-increasing rate".

In 1987, Boas ran to succeed Feinstein as mayor but was defeated by Art Agnos. His campaign posters still "dotted the city" the following year when, during a police sting operation that broke up a widespread teenage prostitution ring, Boas' face was recognized by one of the prostitutes as "a man who had been soliciting the ring for three years".

== Rape conviction ==
On October 22, 1988, Boas pleaded guilty to seven counts of statutory rape involving teenage girls, and twelve more counts were dismissed in exchange for his guilty plea. On November 19, 1988, he was fined $100,000 and sentenced to six months of community service.

== 1980s to death ==
Boas was a longtime member of the Concordia Club in San Francisco.

In the 1990s, he taught an Urban Studies Series at the Fromm Institute at the University of San Francisco. He is the longest-serving member of the Friends of the Fromm Institute Board of Directors. In May 2011, he was honored at the 35-year anniversary of the Fromm Institute at which he presented a lecture entitled "The Last 35 Years: Progress or Decline".

In November 2011, Nicolas Sarkozy, the President of France awarded Boas the Legion of Honour at a Veterans Day ceremony in San Francisco for contributing to the Liberation of France.

Boas died of natural causes in his San Francisco home on February 10, 2017.

== Bibliography ==
- John Roger Boas, "Democratic State Central Committee Chairman, 1968–1970," an oral history conducted in 1982 by Sarah Sharp, in Democratic Party Politics and Environmental Issues in California, 1962–1976, Regional Oral History Office, The Bancroft Library, University of California, Berkeley, 1986.
