= Irv Torgoff =

American basketball player (1917–1993)

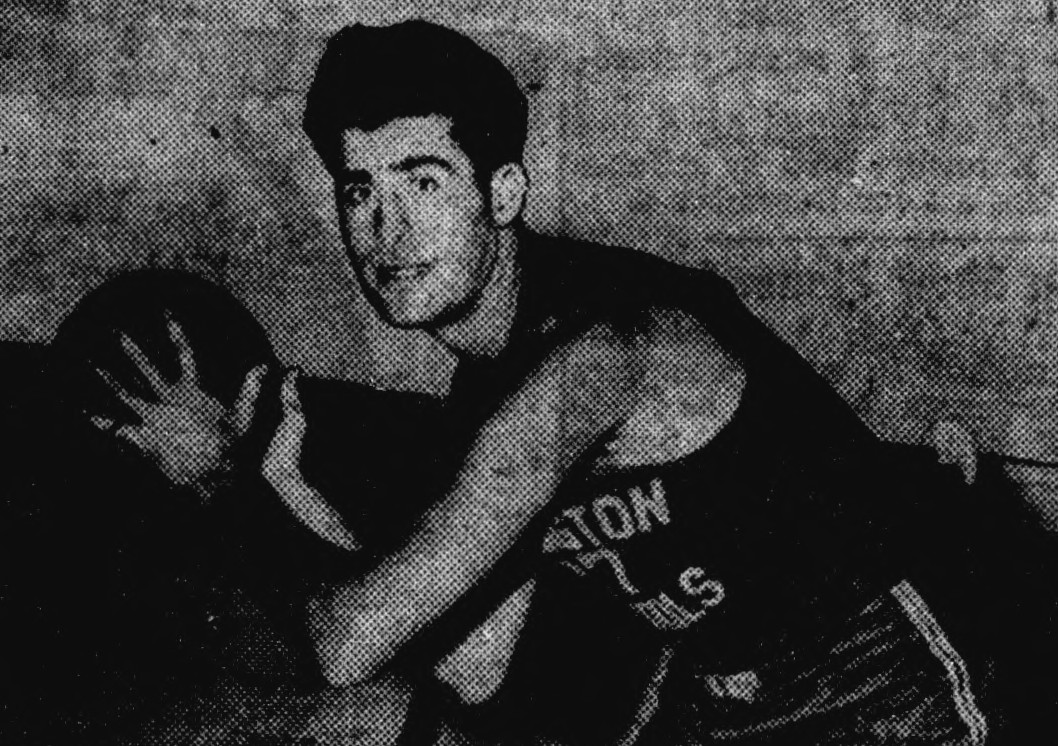
- Torgoff, circa 1946

Personal information
- Born: March 6, 1917 Brooklyn, New York, U.S.
- Died: October 21, 1993 (aged 76) Fort Lauderdale, Florida, U.S.
- Listed height: 6 ft 2 in (1.88 m)
- Listed weight: 192 lb (87 kg)

Career information
- High school: Tilden (Brooklyn, New York)
- College: LIU Brooklyn (1935–1939)
- Playing career: 1939–1949
- Position: Forward

Career history
- 1939–1940: Detroit Eagles
- 1940–1946: Philadelphia Sphas
- 1946–1948: Washington Capitols
- 1948–1949: Baltimore Bullets
- 1949: Philadelphia Warriors
- 1949–1950: Trenton Tigers

Career highlights
- NIT champion (1939); Consensus first-team All-American (1939); Haggerty Award (1939)
- Stats at NBA.com
- Stats at Basketball Reference

Irving Torgoff (March 6, 1917 – October 21, 1993) was an American professional basketball player.

== Early life ==
Torgoff was born in Brooklyn, New York, and played basketball at Tilden High School.

== Education ==
He attended Long Island University from 1935 to 1939 and was a two-time All-American for coach Clair Bee. In 1939, Torgoff led LIU to an undefeated record and a National Invitation Tournament championship over Loyola University Chicago. At the end of the season, he was named the winner of the Haggerty Award as the top collegiate player in the New York City area.

== Career ==
After graduating, Torgoff played professional basketball with the Detroit Eagles of the National Basketball League, the Philadelphia Sphas of the American Basketball League, and the Washington Capitols, Baltimore Bullets, and Philadelphia Warriors of the Basketball Association of America.

Red Auerbach, who coached the Capitols before gaining fame as coach of the Boston Celtics, said of Torgoff, "He was really the first player who became known as a sixth man in basketball. Torgoff was the kind of player who could come off the bench and was as good as any of the starters. He could turn a whole game around. He was one of the great players." He has the lowest career shooting percentage of any player with at least 1,000 shot attempts at 24.6%.

After his basketball career ended, Torgoff sold fabrics and yarn. He died of a heart attack in Fort Lauderdale, Florida, in 1993.

== BAA career statistics ==
Legend
GP	Games played	FG%	Field-goal percentage
FT%	Free-throw percentage	APG	Assists per game
PPG	Points per game	**Bold**	Career high

=== Regular season ===
Year	Team	GP	FG%	FT%	APG	PPG
1946–47	Washington	**58**	.273	.730	.5	**8.4**
1947–48	Washington	47	.205	.813	.7	7.2
1948–49	Baltimore	29	.253	.768	**1.1**	4.6
1948–49	Philadelphia	13	**.292**	**.875**	.9	2.7
Career		147	.246	.771	.7	6.8

=== Playoffs ===
Year	Team	GP	FG%	FT%	APG	PPG
1947	Washington	**6**	**.160**	**.684**	.8	**6.5**
1949	Philadelphia	2	.000	.000	**1.0**	.0
Career		8	.155	.684	.9	4.9
