= Jack Rocker =

American basketball player (1922–2010)

Personal information
- Born: August 12, 1922 Lindsay, California, U.S.
- Died: November 27, 2010 (aged 88) Bainbridge Island, Washington, U.S.
- Listed height: 6 ft 5 in (1.96 m)
- Listed weight: 185 lb (84 kg)

Career information
- High school: Lindsay (Lindsay, California)
- College: California (1942–1947)
- BAA draft: 1947: undrafted
- Playing career: 1947–1948
- Position: Power forward / center
- Number: 19

Career history
- 1947: Minneapolis Lakers
- 1947–1948: Philadelphia Warriors

Career highlights
- All-PCC (1947)
- Stats at NBA.com
- Stats at Basketball Reference

Jack Leonard Rocker (August 12, 1922 – November 27, 2010) was an American professional basketball player for the Philadelphia Warriors of the Basketball Association of America (BAA). He played college basketball for the California Golden Bears and was an All-Pacific Coast Conference (PCC) selection in 1947. Rocker then played one season for the Warriors in 1947–48.

== BAA career statistics ==
Legend
GP	Games played
FG%	Field-goal percentage
FT%	Free-throw percentage
APG	Assists per game
PPG	Points per game

=== Regular season ===
Year	Team	GP	FG%	FT%	APG	PPG
1947–48	Philadelphia	9	.364	1.000	.3	1.9
Career		9	.364	1.000	.3	1.9
