= 1946–47 Washington Capitols season =

- Division champions
- Head coach: Red Auerbach
- Owner: Mike Uline
- Arena: Uline Arena

Results
- Record: 49–11 (.817)
- Place: Division: 1st (Eastern)
- Playoff finish: Lost BAA Semifinals
- Stats at Basketball Reference
- Radio: WTOP

The 1946–47 Washington Capitols season was the inaugural season of the Washington Capitols in the Basketball Association of America (BAA). The 49–11 record not only set a BAA record for the best record held in the newly created league's history (as well as remained the best record of its existence while operating as the National Basketball Association successor that still has the BAA's history as a part of its official history up until the 1966–67 Philadelphia 76ers season broke that record for the NBA 20 years later), but also held the record for the fewest number of losses a BAA/NBA team could have in one season of play until the 1995–96 Chicago Bulls season broke that mark nearly 50 years later (which later got broken by the 2015–16 Golden State Warriors). Not only that, but they would also be nearly undefeated at home as well, with them waiting until their third-to-last game of the season to lost at home against the New York Knicks as well. Despite their fantastic record (especially at home) and being led by a young, legendary head coach named Red Auerbach, the Capitols would be eliminated in the BAA's semifinal round following a quarterfinal bye they had alongside the Western Division champion Chicago Stags with a 4–2 series defeat to the Stags, which led to them failing to advance into the league's very first championship series in the 1947 BAA Finals. Greater details on their first season would be explored in Charley Rosen's book called "The First Tip-Off: The Incredible Story of the Birth of the NBA", with an entire chapter dedicated to the Capitols' first season in the BAA/NBA alongside the many highs and scant few lows from this specific season that would eventually lead them to surprisingly folding their franchise during the 1950–51 NBA season.

== Roster ==
Due to this being the first season in the franchise's history, the BAA didn't utilize a draft system like they would in future seasons of the BAA/NBA and instead relied upon some combination of the head coach and the general manager of the team finding and signing players in time to start out their training camp period for the season. For the Capitols, young head coach Red Auerbach did all of the roster building work for the team since the much older Mike Uline didn't have any of the basketball smarts in mind for building up the team in question despite Uline giving Auerbach a one-year deal worth $5,000 this season (though Auerbach took it since his previous school job had a yearly salary of $2,900 to teach his students both hygiene and physical education). Interestingly, Auerbach went against what the rest of the BAA teams were doing (mainly acquiring local players through the hopes of boosting up their attendance) and instead contacted his players through telephone calls due to him thinking that certain geographical areas produced better skillsets for certain players to excel in the game of basketball, such as guards and good ball handlers being from big cities, guards and forwards being from the Midwestern areas of the U.S.A., rebounding players (like centers) being found pretty much anywhere outside of New York (due to that state usually producing guards), and a majority of one-handed jump-shooters coming from the West Coast area of the United States. Because of that systematic belief from Auerbach, his opening night roster included Bob Feerick from the University of Santa Clara, Bones McKinney from the University of North Carolina at Chapel Hill (formerly from North Carolina State University), former Philadelphia Sphas forward Irv Torgoff from Long Island University, Fred Scolari from the University of San Francisco, the American Basketball League's champion Baltimore Bullets' own Johnny Norlander from Hamline College, John Mahnken from Georgetown University, Buddy O'Grady from Georgetown University, Marty Passaglia from the University of Santa Clara, Al Negratti from Seton Hall College, Gene Gallette from Galileo High School and Saint Mary's College of California, and Bob Gantt from Duke University, with Auerbach negotiating every player's salaries this season and also training them to what would be seen as "midseason" conditioning at the time for them by the start of the season so that they would have a huge advantage over every other BAA team at that point in time.

1946–47 Washington Capitols roster
Players

Pos.	No.	Player	Height	Weight	DOB	From
G/F	10	Bob Feerick	6 ft 3 in (1.91 m)	190 lb (86 kg)	1920-01-02	Santa Clara
F/C	19	Bob Gantt	6 ft 4 in (1.93 m)	205 lb (93 kg)	1922-06-22	Duke
C	12	John Mahnken	6 ft 8 in (2.03 m)	220 lb (100 kg)	1922-06-16	Georgetown
SF	17	Bones McKinney	6 ft 6 in (1.98 m)	185 lb (84 kg)	1919-01-01	North Carolina
F	16	Johnny Norlander	6 ft 3 in (1.91 m)	180 lb (82 kg)	1921-03-05	Hamline
G	6–21	Buddy O'Grady	5 ft 11 in (1.80 m)	160 lb (73 kg)	1920-01-19	Georgetown
G	4	Marty Passaglia	6 ft 1 in (1.85 m)	170 lb (77 kg)	1919-04-22	Santa Clara
PG	14–23	Fred Scolari	5 ft 10 in (1.78 m)	180 lb (82 kg)	1922-03-01	San Francisco
F	15–22	Irv Torgoff	6 ft 2 in (1.88 m)	192 lb (87 kg)	1917-03-06	Long Island

Coaches
Head coach

Red Auerbach

Legend
- (DP) Unsigned draft pick
- (FA) Free agent
- (S) Suspended
- Injured

Roster

== Regular season ==
=== Season standings ===
#	Eastern Division				
#	Team	W	L	PCT	GB
1	x-Washington Capitols	49	11	.817	–
2	x-Philadelphia Warriors	35	25	.583	14
3	x-New York Knicks	33	27	.550	16
4	Providence Steamrollers	28	32	.467	21
5	Boston Celtics	22	38	.367	27
6	Toronto Huskies	22	38	.367	27

=== Game log ===
1946–47 game log
Total: 49–11
November: 9–3 (home: 4–0; road: 5–3)

Game	Date	Team	Score	High points	Location Attendance	Record
1	November 2	@ Detroit	W 50–33	Bob Feerick, Fred Scolari (14)	Detroit Olympia	1–0
2	November 4	@ Pittsburgh	W 71–56	Bob Feerick (14)	Duquesne Gardens	2–0
3	November 9	@ St. Louis	L 69–70	Johnny Norlander (22)	St. Louis Arena	2–1
4	November 10	@ Cleveland	L 68–92	Johnny Norlander (21)	Cleveland Arena	2–2
5	November 14	@ Philadelphia	L 65–68	Bones McKinney (26)	Philadelphia Arena	2–3
6	November 16	@ Chicago	W 73–65	Johnny Norlander (18)	Chicago Stadium	3–3
7	November 20	St. Louis	W 54–51	John Mahnken (14)	Uline Arena	4–3
8	November 21	@ Providence	W 66–58	Irv Torgoff (16)	Rhode Island Auditorium	5–3
9	November 23	Toronto	W 74–50	Bob Feerick (20)	Uline Arena	6–3
10	November 26	@ Toronto	W 78–68	John Mahnken (21)	Maple Leaf Gardens	7–3
11	November 27	Chicago	W 75–67	Bob Feerick (21)	Uline Arena	8–3
12	November 30	Pittsburgh	W 49–40	Bob Feerick (14)	Uline Arena	9–3

December: 10–0 (home: 7–0; road: 3–0)

Game	Date	Team	Score	High points	Location Attendance	Record
13	December 4	Providence	W 80–62	Fred Scolari (16)		10–3
14	December 7	Detroit	W 75–64	John Mahnken (18)		11–3
15	December 11	Detroit	W 81–66	Johnny Norlander (17)		12–3
16	December 12	@ Philadelphia	W 64–49	Fred Scolari (15)		13–3
17	December 14	Cleveland	W 72–52	Fred Scolari (16)		14–3
18	December 18	St. Louis	W 68–47	Bones McKinney (15)		15–3
19	December 21	Philadelphia	W 68–56	Fred Scolari (20)		16–3
20	December 26	@ Providence	W 78–66	Bob Feerick (21)		17–3
21	December 28	New York	W 70–49	Bob Feerick (17)		18–3
22	December 30	@ Boston	W 70–60 (OT)	Bones McKinney (22)		19–3

January: 10–4 (home: 7–0; road: 3–4)

Game	Date	Team	Score	High points	Location Attendance	Record
23	January 1	@ Detroit	L 57–62	Fred Scolari (19)		19–4
24	January 2	@ St. Louis	L 57–66	Bones McKinney (13)		19–5
25	January 4	Cleveland	W 78–64	Bones McKinney (21)		20–5
26	January 6	@ Pittsburgh	W 63–49	Bob Feerick (21)		21–5
27	January 8	Providence	W 77–69	Bob Feerick (22)		22–5
28	January 11	Toronto	W 81–66	Bob Feerick (24)		23–5
29	January 15	@ New York	W 65–63	Bob Feerick (18)		24–5
30	January 16	@ Boston	L 38–47	Fred Scolari (17)		24–6
31	January 18	Chicago	W 87–72	Feerick, Scolari (22)		25–6
32	January 22	Philadelphia	W 57–55	Feerick, McKinney (19)		26–6
33	January 25	Pittsburgh	W 84–71	Bob Feerick (17)		27–6
34	January 27	@ Boston	W 80–57	Bones McKinney (13)		28–6
35	January 29	Boston	W 69–57	Bones McKinney (22)		29–6
36	January 31	@ Toronto	L 74–83	Fred Scolari (16)		29–7

February: 10–3 (home: 4–0; road: 6–3)

Game	Date	Team	Score	High points	Location Attendance	Record
37	February 2	@ Cleveland	W 107–81	Bob Feerick (22)		30–7
38	February 5	@ Detroit	W 67–46	Bob Feerick (16)		31–7
39	February 8	@ St. Louis	W 68–65	Feerick, Norlander (14)		32–7
40	February 9	@ Chicago	L 67–85	Fred Scolari (22)		32–8
41	February 10	@ Pittsburgh	L 69–75	Fred Scolari (17)		32–9
42	February 12	@ New York	L 72–76	Bob Feerick (21)		32–10
43	February 15	Philadelphia	W 70–60	Bob Feerick (16)		33–10
44	February 19	Toronto	W 69–59	Feerick, McKinney (15)		34–10
45	February 20	@ Providence	W 82–74	Bones McKinney (25)		35–10
46	February 22	Pittsburgh	W 93–61	Fred Scolari (29)		36–10
47	February 23	@ Cleveland	W 91–83	Bob Feerick (20)		37–10
48	February 24	Boston	W 83–59	Bob Feerick (24)|		38–10
49	February 26	@ New York	W 84–60	Irv Torgoff (16)		39–10

March: 10–1 (home: 7–1; road: 3–0)

Game	Date	Team	Score	High points	Location Attendance	Record
50	March 1	Boston	W 75–52	Bob Feerick (30)		40–10
51	March 5	Detroit	W 99–67	Feerick, Scolari (22)		41–10
52	March 7	@ Toronto	W 86–70	Bob Feerick (19)		42–10
53	March 8	St. Louis	W 74–73	Fred Scolari (19)		43–10
54	March 11	@ Philadelphia	W 80–77	Bob Feerick (24)		44–10
55	March 13	@ Chicago	W 86–69	Bob Feerick (16)		45–10
56	March 15	New York	W 78–63	Bob Feerick (26)		46–10
57	March 19	Providence	W 96–95 (OT)	Bob Feerick (35)		47–10
58	March 22	New York	L 63–68	Fred Scolari (21)		47–11
59	March 26	Chicago	W 105–77	Bones McKinney (18)		48–11
60	March 29	Cleveland	W 79–69	Bob Feerick (22)		49–11

== BAA Playoffs ==
=== BAA Semifinals ===
(E1) Washington Capitols vs. (W1) Chicago Stags: Stags win series 4-2

- Game 1 @ Washington (April 2): Chicago 81, Washington 65
- Game 2 @ Washington (April 3): Chicago 69, Washington 53
- Game 3 @ Chicago (April 8): Chicago 67, Washington 55
- Game 4 @ Washington (April 10): Washington 76, Chicago 69
- Game 5 @ Chicago (April 12): Washington 67, Chicago 55
- Game 6 @ Chicago (April 13): Chicago 66, Washington 61

== Awards and records ==
=== Awards ===
- Bob Feerick, All-BAA First Team
- Bones McKinney, All-BAA First Team
- Fred Scolari, All-BAA Second Team

=== Records ===
- Have the best record in the history of the BAA (49–11).

== Season losses ==
Throughout this season, the Washington Capitols only had an average total of 2,189 paid attendees per game, with net receipts totaling up to $98,901 for the season and estimated losses totaling up to around only $125,000 for this season. Despite the high amount of lost revenue this season, the Capitols would still be one of six teams to fully confirm their interest in staying on board for another season while playing in the BAA, thanks primarily to the strong performance of the team and the leadership of young head coach Red Auerbach this season. Despite their very promising performance from this season, however, Washington would continue to play for the BAA/NBA up until 1951 before folding operations for good (albeit being without Auerbach coaching in some of their later seasons of play due to Uline refusing to allow for Auerbach to have a proper multi-year contract on his name despite being proven to be a successful head coach while under the Washington Capitols name), with their folding occurring while the Capitols were still playing during the 1950–51 NBA season on January 9, 1951 due to Mike Uline realizing his Uline Arena was just too small to make a proper profit for his professional basketball team (though the Capitols would try and return once again for one more season under the now-smaller American Basketball League as something akin to a minor league team before that team folded for good the following season there on January 11, 1952), which made the Washington Capitols the last original BAA franchise to fold operations as of 2027 (as well as the only original one to fold operations during a regular season in the NBA's history).
