= Dick O'Keefe =

American basketball player

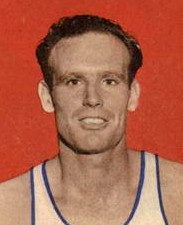
- O'Keefe in 1948

Personal information
- Born: September 29, 1923 San Francisco, California, U.S.
- Died: December 17, 2006 (aged 83) Greenbrae, California, U.S.
- Listed height: 6 ft 2 in (1.88 m)
- Listed weight: 185 lb (84 kg)

Career information
- High school: St. James (San Francisco, California)
- College: Santa Clara (1942–1943); Pacific (1943–1944); Santa Clara (1946–1947)
- BAA draft: 1947: 1st round, 9th overall pick
- Drafted by: Washington Capitols
- Playing career: 1947–1952
- Position: Small forward / shooting guard
- Number: 15, 13

Career history
- 1947–1951: Washington Capitols
- Stats at NBA.com
- Stats at Basketball Reference

Richard Thomas O'Keefe (September 29, 1923 – December 17, 2006) was an American professional basketball player. After serving as captain of the St. James High School basketball team in his hometown of San Francisco, California, O'Keefe began his college basketball career with Santa Clara Broncos in 1941. He played for the Pacific Tigers during the 1943–44 season. He missed the 1944–45 and 1945–46 seasons to serve in World War II, but returned to play his senior year with the Broncos in 1946–47. O'Keefe was selected with the ninth overall pick in the 1947 BAA draft by the Washington Capitols and played with the team for four years until it folded from the NBA in 1951 before rejoining them in the smaller American Basketball League for the 1951–52 season before that team folded for good in January 1952 due to law concerns with the NBA holding the legal copyright to the Washington Capitols team and their history.

After his basketball career, O'Keefe worked as a security chief. He served as a charter member of Santa Clara's Athletic Hall of Fame, and was inducted into the San Francisco Prep Hall of Fame in 2002.

== BAA/NBA career statistics ==
Legend
GP	Games played	APG	Assists per game
FG%	Field-goal percentage	PPG	Points per game
FT%	Free-throw percentage	**Bold**	Career high

=== Regular season ===
Year	Team	GP	FG%	FT%	APG	PPG
1947–48	Washington	37	.245	.508	0.5	4.2
1948–49	Washington	50	.255	.515	0.9	3.8
1949–50	Washington	**68**	**.306**	**.739**	1.1	**7.0**
1950–51	Washington	17	.206	.641	**1.5**	3.9
Career		172	.272	.640	0.9	5.2

=== Playoffs ===
Year	Team	GP	FG%	FT%	APG	PPG
1949	Washington	**11**	**.367**	.650	1.0	5.2
1950	Washington	2	.308	**.875**	**2.5**	**7.5**
Career		13	.356	.714	1.2	5.5
