= 1947–48 Washington Capitols season =

- Head coach: Red Auerbach
- Owner: Mike Uline
- Arena: Uline Arena

Results
- Record: 28–20 (.583)
- Place: Division: 4th (Western)
- Playoff finish: Lost Division tiebreaker
- Stats at Basketball Reference

Local media
- Television: WTTG
- Radio: WWDC

The 1947–48 BAA season was the Capitols' second season in the BAA (which later became the NBA). Entering this season, the Capitols were expected to be among the elite teams of the BAA this season in spite of them moving from the Eastern Division to the Western Division following the addition of the original Baltimore Bullets and folding of four of the BAA's inaugural teams, with legendary head coach Red Auerbach being given another one-year contract by team owner Mike Uline due to the latter's prior bad experience with multi-year contracts. However, despite them retaining Auerbach's services and retaining most of their roster while maintaining the same "midseason" conditioning plan from the previous season into this season, the Capitols would end up downgrading their results throughout the season with a 28–20 record, being behind the St. Louis Bombers for a first place finish and being tied with both the former ABL-born Baltimore Bullets and the Chicago Stags for the final two playoff spots in the Western Division, which led to a unique Western Division tiebreaker period where Washington and Chicago would compete against each other once again, but in a winner-takes-all match for one of the playoff spots in the Western Division, with Baltimore automatically qualifying for the other spot by default. Disappointingly, Washington would lose to Chicago once again, this time being defeated 74–70 to be eliminated from playoff contention entirely this season. Following this elimination, Auerbach would be given one more one-year contract by Mike Uline due to Auerbach losing some ground in his negotiations at the time, with the upcoming season looking to be a "prove-it" season for him in order to showcase the previous season wasn't a fluke for his sake in terms of production.

== Draft picks ==
Round	Pick	Player	Position	Nationality	College
1	9	Dick O'Keefe	G/F	United States	Santa Clara
–	–	Bill Burke	–	United States	St. Mary's College (MD)
–	–	Paul Cloyd	G/F	United States	Wisconsin
–	–	John Mandic	F/C	United States	Oregon State
–	–	Saul Mariaschin	G	United States	Harvard
–	–	Abel Rodriguez	–	United States	San Francisco
–	–	Irv Rothenberg	C	United States	Long Island
–	–	Jack Tingle	F	United States	Kentucky
–	–	Matt Zunic	G/F	United States	George Washington

== Roster ==
1947–48 Washington Capitols roster
Players

Pos.	No.	Player	Height	Weight	DOB	From
G/F	10	Bob Feerick	6 ft 3 in (1.91 m)	190 lb (86 kg)	1920-01-02	Santa Clara
G	14	Sonny Hertzberg	5 ft 10 in (1.78 m)	175 lb (79 kg)	1922-07-29	CCNY
C	12	John Mahnken	6 ft 8 in (2.03 m)	220 lb (100 kg)	1922-06-16	Georgetown
SF	17	Bones McKinney	6 ft 6 in (1.98 m)	185 lb (84 kg)	1919-01-01	North Carolina
F	16	Johnny Norlander	6 ft 3 in (1.91 m)	180 lb (82 kg)	1921-03-05	Hamline
G/F	15	Dick O'Keefe	6 ft 2 in (1.88 m)	185 lb (84 kg)	1923-09-29	Santa Clara
C	18	Irv Rothenberg	6 ft 7 in (2.01 m)	215 lb (98 kg)	1921-12-31	Long Island
PG	20	Fred Scolari	5 ft 10 in (1.78 m)	180 lb (82 kg)	1922-03-01	San Francisco
F	19	Jack Tingle	6 ft 4 in (1.93 m)	205 lb (93 kg)	1924-12-30	Kentucky
F	4	Irv Torgoff	6 ft 2 in (1.88 m)	192 lb (87 kg)	1917-03-06	Long Island

Coaches
Head coach

Red Auerbach

Legend
- (DP) Unsigned draft pick
- (FA) Free agent
- (S) Suspended
- Injured

Roster

== Regular season ==
=== Season standings ===
#	Western Division				
#	Team	W	L	PCT	GB
1	x-St. Louis Bombers	29	19	.604	–
2	x-Baltimore Bullets	28	20	.583	1
3	x-Chicago Stags	28	20	.583	1
4	x-Washington Capitols	28	20	.583	1

=== Game log ===
1947–48 game log
Total: 28–20
November

Game	Date	Team	Score	High points	Location Attendance	Record
1	November 12	Baltimore	W 63–55	Fred Scolari (17)		1–0
2	November 13	@ New York	L 65–80	Feerick, Scolari (15)		1–1
3	November 15	Boston	L 69–73	Feerick, McKinney (16)		1–2
4	November 19	Philadelphia	W 74–67	Irv Rothenberg (14)		2–2
5	November 20	@ Chicago	L 77–81	Fred Scolari (19)		2–3
6	November 22	@ St. Louis	L 62–70	Johnny Norlander (14)		2–4
7	November 26	St. Louis	W 83–64	Johnny Norlander (17)		3–4
8	November 28	@ Boston	L 83–92	Fred Scolari (22)		3–5
9	November 29	@ Providence	L 78–85	Fred Scolari (21)		3–6

December

Game	Date	Team	Score	High points	Location Attendance	Record
10	December 1	@ New York	W 70–62	Feerick, McKinney (13)		4–6
11	December 3	@ Chicago	L 73–81	Feerick, McKinney (18)		4–7
12	December 11	@ Baltimore	W 71–69 (OT)	Bob Feerick (19)		5–7
13	December 13	@ Providence	W 88–72	Bones McKinney (18)		6–7
14	December 17	Baltimore	W 66–64	Bones McKinney (16)		7–7
15	December 18	@ Chicago	W 70–64	Bob Feerick (17)		8–7
16	December 20	St. Louis	L 52–55	Bones McKinney (19)		8–8
17	December 25	@ St. Louis	W 73–56	Bob Feerick (23)		9–8
18	December 27	Philadelphia	W 72–70	Fred Scolari (18)		10–8

January

Game	Date	Team	Score	High points	Location Attendance	Record
19	January 2	@ Philadelphia	L 60–69	Bob Feerick (22)		10–9
20	January 3	Boston	W 95–60	Bones McKinney (17)		11–9
21	January 8	@ St. Louis	L 73–76	Bob Feerick (18)		11–10
22	January 10	Philadelphia	W 106–99 (OT)	Bob Feerick (21)		12–10
23	January 11	@ Boston	L 56–84	Bob Feerick (16)		12–11
24	January 14	Chicago	W 75–67	Bones McKinney (20)		13–11
25	January 17	New York	W 78–62	Fred Scolari (15)		14–11
26	January 21	St. Louis	W 81–74	Bob Feerick (18)		15–11
27	January 24	Providence	W 69–60	Fred Scolari (14)		16–11
28	January 30	@ Baltimore	L 71–95	Bob Feerick (13)		16–12
29	January 31	Chicago	W 54–48	Bob Feerick (21)		17–12

February

Game	Date	Team	Score	High points	Location Attendance	Record
30	February 4	Baltimore	W 77–72	Bob Feerick (20)		18–12
31	February 5	@ Philadelphia	W 72–60	Johnny Norlander (18)		19–12
32	February 7	Providence	W 86–64	Johnny Norlander (20)		20–12
33	February 10	@ Providence	W 79–60	Bob Feerick (25)		21–12
34	February 14	Boston	W 72–58	Bob Feerick (16)		22–12
35	February 18	New York	L 75–79	Bones McKinney (18)		22–13
36	February 19	@ Philadelphia	L 76–84	Bob Feerick (24)		22–14
37	February 21	Baltimore	W 85–72	Fred Scolari (26)		23–14
38	February 25	Chicago	L 66–73	Bob Feerick (27)		23–15
39	February 26	@ Baltimore	L 70–97	Bob Feerick (26)		23–16
40	February 28	@ St. Louis	L 61–82	Irv Torgoff (14)		23–17
41	February 29	@ Chicago	L 75–76 (OT)	Bob Feerick (21)		23–18

March

Game	Date	Team	Score	High points	Location Attendance	Record
42	March 6	@ New York	L 64–69 (OT)	Bob Feerick (18)		23–19
43	March 10	Chicago	L 54–71	Bob Feerick (12)		23–20
44	March 13	St. Louis	W 86–69	Bob Feerick (19)		24–20
45	March 16	@ Boston	W 76–62	Bob Feerick (12)		25–20
46	March 17	Providence	W 82–67	Fred Scolari (16)		26–20
47	March 18	@ Baltimore	W 71–64	Bob Feerick (24)		27–20
48	March 20	New York	W 103–82	Bob Feerick (22)		28–20

== BAA Playoffs ==
=== Western Division Tiebreaker Series Match ===
Chicago Stags vs. Washington Capitols: Stags win series 1-0

- Game 1 @ Chicago (March 23): Chicago 74, Washington 70
