= Vince Tringali =

American football player and coach (1928–2010)

Biographical details
- Born: August 1, 1928; San Francisco, California, U.S.
- Died: May 31, 2010 (aged 81); Santa Rosa, California, U.S.

Playing career
- 1951–1952: San Francisco
- Position: Tackle

Coaching career (HC unless noted)
- 1969–1971: San Francisco

Head coaching record
- Overall: 2–23 (college)

Vincent Joseph Tringali (August 1, 1928 – May 31, 2010) was an American football player and coach. He played college football at the University of San Francisco where he was on a line that included future National Football League (NFL) players Gino Marchetti, Dick Stanfel, and Bob St. Clair.

After a successful run as the head football coach at St. Ignatius College Preparatory school in San Francisco, California, he served as the final head coach at USF, from 1969 to 1971, before the program was shut down.

Tringali is noted for convincing future NFL player Igor Olshansky to play high school football.

== Head coaching record ==
=== College ===
Year	Team	Overall	Conference	Standing	Bowl/playoffs
San Francisco Dons (NCAA College Division independent) (1969–1971)
1969	San Francisco	2–5			
1970	San Francisco	0–9			
1971	San Francisco	0–9			
San Francisco:		2–23			
Total:		2–23			
