= Fred Scolari =

American basketball player and coach (1922–2002)

Personal information
- Born: March 1, 1922 San Francisco, California, U.S.
- Died: October 17, 2002 (aged 80) San Ramon, California, U.S.
- Listed height: 5 ft 10 in (1.78 m)
- Listed weight: 180 lb (82 kg)

Career information
- High school: Galileo (San Francisco, California)
- College: San Francisco (1942–1946)
- Playing career: 1946–1955
- Position: Point guard
- Number: 14, 23, 20, 10, 24

Career history

Playing
- 1946–1951: Washington Capitols
- 1951: Syracuse Nationals
- 1951–1953: Baltimore Bullets
- 1953–1954: Fort Wayne Pistons
- 1954–1955: Boston Celtics

Coaching
- 1951–1952: Baltimore Bullets

Career highlights
- 2× NBA All-Star (1952, 1953); 2× All-BAA Second Team (1947, 1948)

Career statistics
- Points: 6,014 (11.3 ppg)
- Rebounds: 857 (2.7 rpg)
- Assists: 1,406 (2.6 apg)
- Stats at NBA.com
- Stats at Basketball Reference

Fred Joseph Scolari (March 1, 1922 – October 17, 2002) was an American professional basketball player. At 5'10", he played the point guard position.

== Biography ==
Though he was blind in one eye, deaf in one ear and often overweight, "Fat Freddie" excelled in basketball at Galileo High School and the University of San Francisco. In 1946, he joined the Washington Capitols of the Basketball Association of America (now the NBA) at the start of a nine-year (1946–1955) professional career with the Capitols, Syracuse Nationals, Baltimore Bullets, Fort Wayne Pistons and Boston Celtics. He was one of the last two NBA players who played in its predecessor BAA from its inception in 1946 to retire.

Scolari became known for his unorthodox, yet effective, shooting style, in which he released the ball from his hip. He led the BAA in free-throw percentage for the 1946–47 BAA season. He was also a well-regarded defender, and was voted to the All-BAA Second Team in 1947 and 1948.

After his basketball career ended, he became a successful insurance salesman. He later served as director of the Salesian Boys and Girls Club in San Francisco. In 1998, he was elected to the Bay Area Sports Hall of Fame. He died in 2002.

== BAA/NBA career statistics ==
Legend
GP	Games played	MPG	Minutes per game
FG%	Field-goal percentage	FT%	Free-throw percentage
RPG	Rebounds per game	APG	Assists per game
PPG	Points per game	**Bold**	Career high

=== Regular season ===
Year	Team	GP	MPG	FG%	FT%	RPG	APG	PPG
1946–47	Washington	58	–	.294	.811	–	1.0	12.6
1947–48	Washington	47	–	.294	.732	–	1.2	12.5
1948–49	Washington	48	–	.310	.798	–	2.1	11.2
1949–50	Washington	**66**	–	.343	.822	–	2.7	13.0
1950–51	Washington / Syracuse	66	–	.327	.843	3.3	3.9	13.4
1951–52	Baltimore	64	35.0	.334	.835	3.3	**4.7**	**14.6**
1952–53	Baltimore	46	**35.2**	.334	**.849**	**3.5**	4.3	14.2
1952–53	Fort Wayne	16	31.6	**.377**	.824	2.9	2.3	11.1
1953–54	Fort Wayne	64	24.8	.324	.800	2.2	2.0	7.2
1954–55	Boston	59	10.5	.305	.796	1.3	1.6	3.2
Career		534	26.4	.321	.818	2.7	2.6	11.3

=== Playoffs ===
Year	Team	GP	MPG	FG%	FT%	RPG	APG	PPG
1947	Washington	6	–	.232	.794	–	.8	11.8
1949	Washington	**9**	–	.270	.700	–	1.8	9.1
1950	Washington	2	–	**.481**	**1.000**	–	1.5	**18.5**
1951	Syracuse	7	–	.355	.815	5.9	2.3	12.6
1953	Fort Wayne	8	**33.5**	.322	.803	**3.1**	**2.6**	13.4
1954	Fort Wayne	4	15.0	.250	.000	1.8	1.5	3.0
1955	Boston	5	5.8	.267	.800	1.0	.6	2.4
Career		41	21.0	.302	.792	3.3	1.7	10.0

== Head coaching record ==
Team	Year	G	W	L	W–L%	Finish	PG	PW	PL	PW–L%	Result
Baltimore	1951–52	41	12	27	.308		—	—	—	—	
Career		41	12	27	.308		0	0	0	–	
