= Galileo Academy of Science and Technology =

Coordinates: 37°48′14″N 122°25′27″W

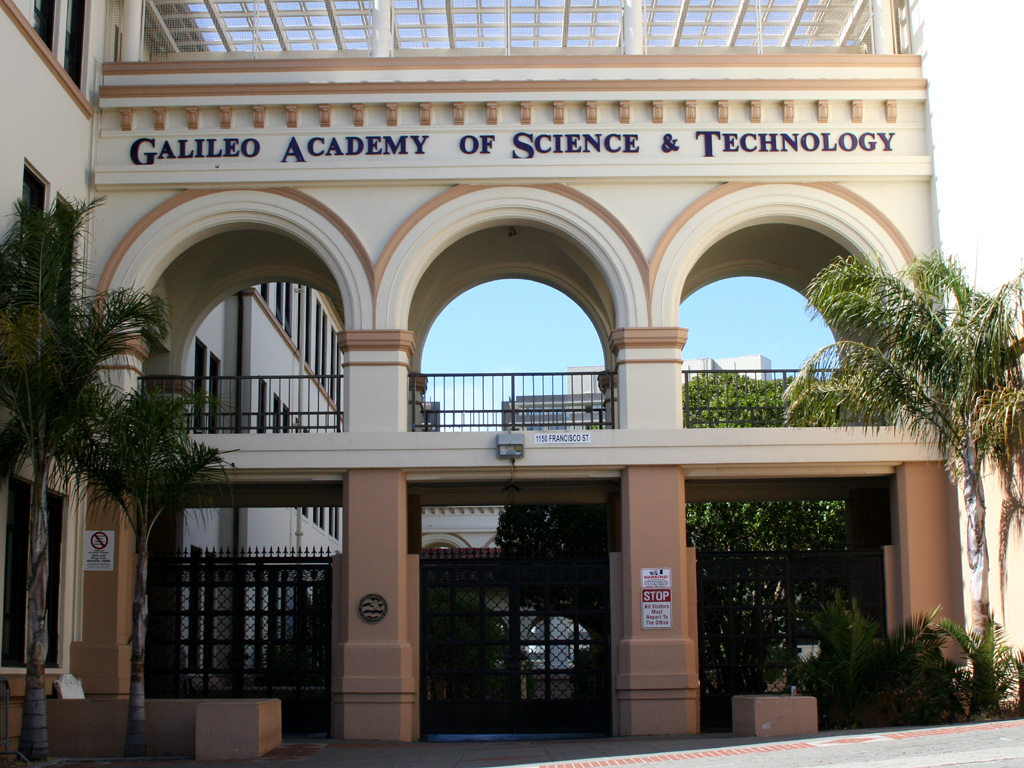

Location
- 1150 Francisco Street; San Francisco, California 94109; United States

Information
- Type: Public High school
- Motto: Italian: Eppure si muove (And yet it moves)
- Established: August 1, 1921
- School district: San Francisco Unified School District
- NCES School ID: 05612
- Principal: Delores Brown
- Teaching staff: 90.99 (FTE)
- Grades: 9-12
- Enrollment: 1,741 (2023–2024)
- Student to teacher ratio: 19.13
- Hours in school day: 7 hours
- Campus type: Urban
- Colors: Purple and Gold
- Mascot: Lion
- Accreditation: Western Association of Schools and Colleges
- Newspaper: The Pendulum
- Yearbook: Telescope
- Website: Galileo Web

Galileo Academy of Science and Technology, formerly known as Galileo High School, is a public high school located in the northeastern corner of the Russian Hill neighborhood, near the Marina District and Fisherman's Wharf neighborhoods of San Francisco, California. The school is a part of the San Francisco Unified School District.

== About Galileo ==
Galileo Academy is located in the historic north end of San Francisco, and was originally built in 1921. As of May 2015, Galileo has more than 150 faculty and staff members and serves more than 1,800 students. It is one of two Bay Area schools with an observatory. The observatory at Galileo is not in use at this time. Plans for restoration are in progress. Galileo received the 2005 California Distinguished School Award along with the 2005 CTE Award - one of the very few schools that were awarded this.

The lion is the official mascot of Galileo. In sports and other inter-school activities the team members are known as the Galileo Lions. The official school colors are purple and orange. Galileo has an internal television network, G-House TV, which is broadcast by students of the Media Arts Pathway. The Media Arts Pathway (MAP) works on all media-related works while AoIT concentrates on computer science related works. The school motto is Eppure si muove (Italian: And yet it moves). As the story goes, Galileo Galilei was told to deny his scientific findings that the earth moved, or be punished - so he did as he was ordered. But on his way out he mumbled to himself, "And yet it moves."

== History ==
On December 10, 1920, Major Joseph P. Nourse, who had been actively engaged in educational work in the city for many years, became the first principal of Galileo High School. Throughout the summer, carpenters were busy converting the Red Cross Building, located on Fulton Street near the Civic Center. On August 1, 1921, Galileo High School welcomed its student body into the remodeled facilities. The ceremony of "breaking ground" for the new building was on November 4, 1921, and the dedication of the Van Ness Building on March 30, 1924. At the same time, plans were underway for a new wing which would double the school's capacity.

In the 1920s, the Galileo High School building was considered an outstanding example of modern architecture. Planned with the intention of housing one of the best educational institutions in the country, it was equipped to offer the highest type of academic curriculum in addition to training in commercial and technical branches.

During the 1970s, Galileo went through an extensive refit where most, if not all, student facilities were moved across the street onto Fort Mason. Before this, there were rumors that the Galileo campus would be permanently moved onto the Fort Mason site. Though the student population, then, did not indicate whether the move and larger facilities would be justified, the land that Galileo sits on was quite valuable, which could have made the move plausible.

Since the 1995-96 school year, Galileo has transformed itself to the Galileo Academy of Science and Technology. The new program provides students with career pathways and academies. These include the Galileo Health Academy, the Academy of Information Technology (AoIT), Biotechnology Pathway and the Environmental Science Pathway. In 2006-2007, the Publications Pathway was introduced and, in 2007-2008, the Academy of Hospitality and Tourism (AoHT) and Digital Photography Pathway.

On September 25, 2007, while some construction workers were digging the courtyard, they found a time capsule which was thought to be lost forever by the Class of 1982. It was uncovered that day, but was filled with water, as well as a yearbook, a frisbee, a Rubik's Cube and a Mighty Lion T-shirt. It was buried shortly after the class of '82 graduated, but, in 1997, a search for the time capsule over every square foot of the courtyard turned up nothing. The time capsule is now stored in one of the closets in the building.

On October 31, 2007, the courtyard partially reopened with a ribbon-cutting ceremony by the ASB officers, followed by a celebration and a contest. The courtyard did not fully open until November, as there was still more maintenance work required.

On August 21, 2024, during 12:35 p.m., a physical altercation involving two people escalated into one student being wounded by gunfire. A student was shot once in the shoulder adjacent to the school's campus, close to where the athletic fields are. As of September 2024, the suspect has not been identified or arrested; at least one witness said the suspect ran away wearing a mask. According to the victim's mother, he was pressured to join the alleged suspect's gang and refused.

== Statistics ==
=== Demographics ===
The Caucasian student body jumped from 5% in 2012 to 11% in 2022.

Ethnic Demographic for 2018-2019
Category	% of Students	# of Students
Chinese-American	57.5	867
Hispanic/Latino	16.9	354
White (Not Hispanic)	6.6	86
Filipino-American	5.8	95
African-American	5.4	89
Asian-American Other	5.0	95
Middle Eastern/Arabic	2.5	46
Native American	0.2	1
Other	9.1	167

Gender Demographic for 2018-2019
Category	% of Students	# of Students
Male	56	1029
Female	44	806

=== Standardized testing ===
SAT Scores for 2015-16
	Reading Average	Math Average	Writing Average
Galileo	439	507	430
District	474	517	467
State	484	494	477

== Academies and pathways ==
Students in their sophomore, junior, and senior years can participate in one of the five career pathways or academies. In small learning communities, students choose to take a particular elective class that is paired with one or two core academic classes. Biotechnology is paired with English; Health with English; AOIT with English and Social Studies; and AOHT with Math. In addition to the academies and pathways, students can choose to be in the Chinese Immersion program or in the Advancement Via Individual Determination (AVID) program. Both programs are integrated into their school day, and are 4-year long programs.

== Location ==
The school is located at 1150 Francisco Street, San Francisco, CA.

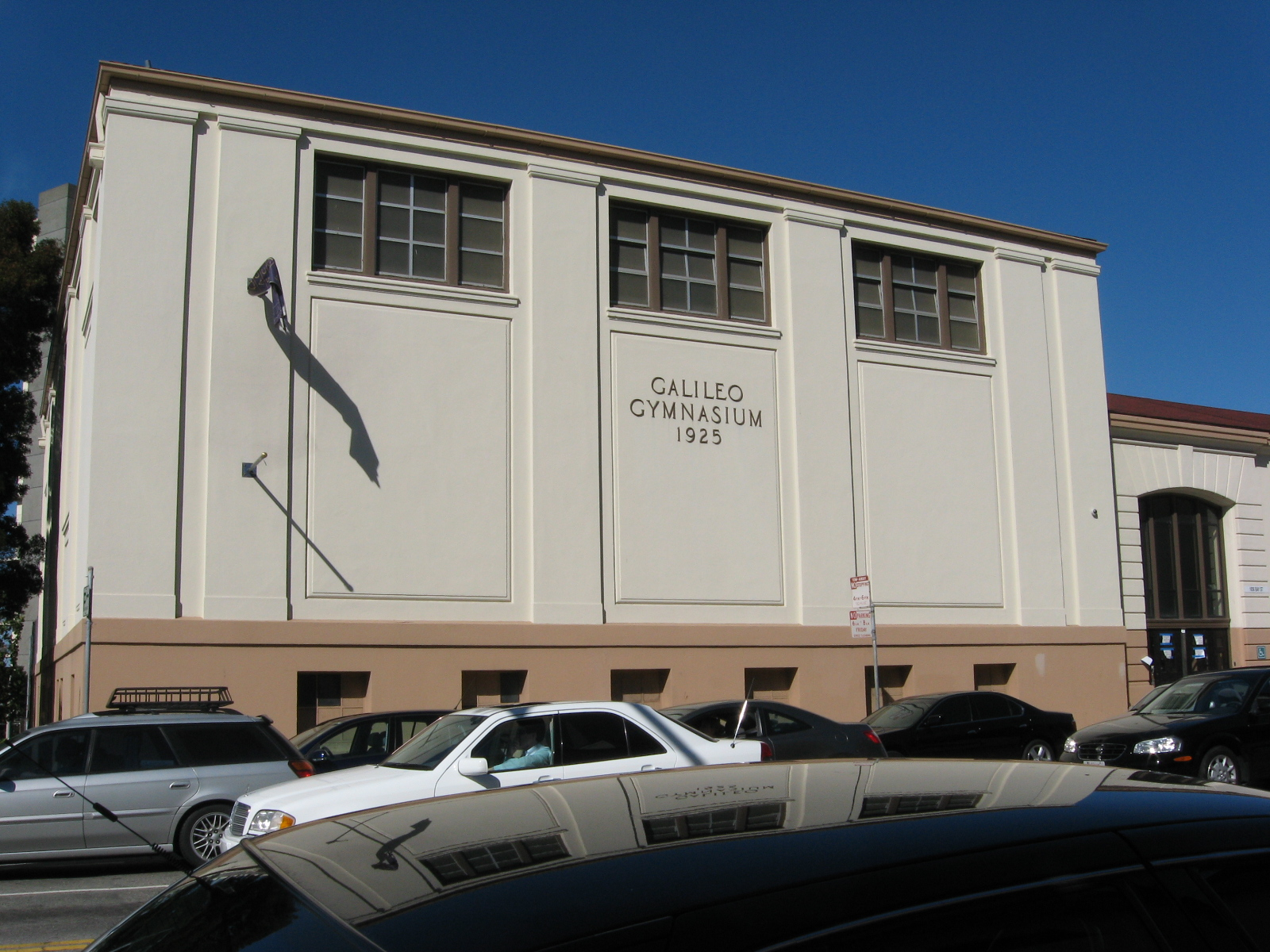
Galileo Gymnasium

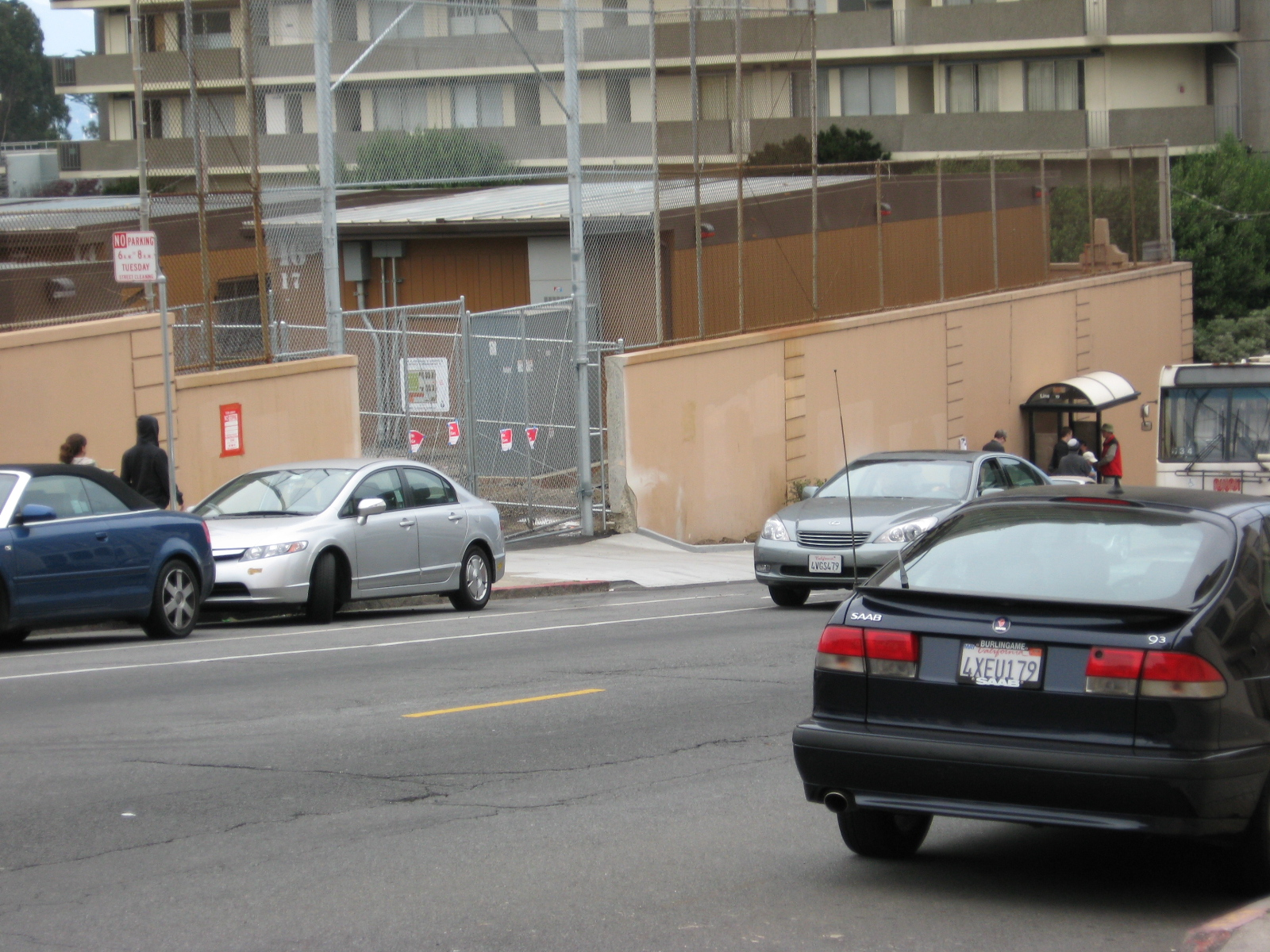
Bungalows on the football field of Galileo Academy of Science and Technology during reconstruction.

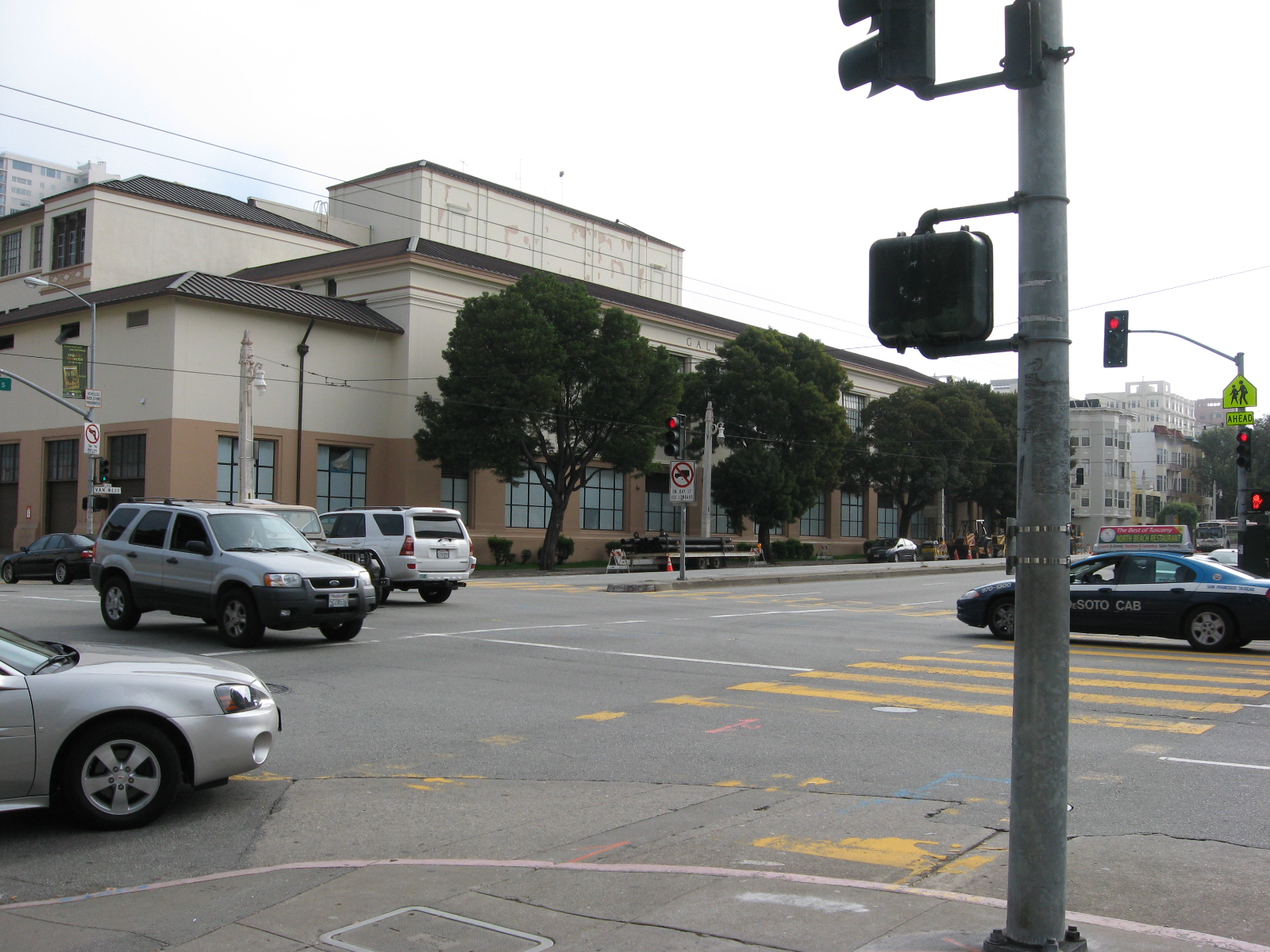
Galileo's Northwestern corner and loading dock at Van Ness & Bay Streets.

Galileo is located in far northern San Francisco, in the Russian Hill neighborhood near Fort Mason.

Muni bus service is plentiful in the vicinity, with direct access to six bus routes, and various others in the area. Less than half of the students reside near the school, but school buses and special buses on the 28-19th Avenue are provided by the Municipal Railway. Special bus service exclusively serves students in SFUSD, and only drops off passengers. The 19-Polk, 30-Stockton, and 49-Van Ness/Mission also serve nearby, but have no special runs.

=== Facility ===
==== Internal features ====
- 4-story Western Wing
- 5-story Eastern Wing
- Observatory (Closed)
- 4 computer laboratories
- In-house TV studio
- 3 gymnasiums
- Dance studio
- Fitness lab
- TRX Training Station
- Schoolwide surveillance
- Schoolwide Wi-Fi Coverage

==== External features ====
- Courtyard
- 3 basketball courts
- Football field
- Roof garden
- Underground Bay Street Tunnel (Connecting the main and Bay Street Gymnasium buildings)
- Parking Lot

== Junior Reserve Officers' Training Corps program ==
The Junior Reserve Officers' Training Corps battalion at Galileo is an Honor Unit with Distinction, the highest designation a unit may have. Its afterschool teams are very competitive, often highly placed in the annual fall and spring competitions. Fall teams consist of the Guidon, Squad Drill, Color Guard and Drill Platoon while Spring teams include Drum Corps, Silent Drill Team and Exhibition Drill Team. Other competitions occur during the last week of school at Camp Parks. This consists of cadet challenge and various other sporting events.

The program was disbanded in 2018, though reinstated the following school year under new leadership due to outcry and support for the program.

== American football ==
Largely due its alumnus O. J. Simpson, Galileo was well known for its American football team.

The football field that dominates the second block of Galileo was formerly named in honor of O. J. Simpson. However, after Simpson's trial for murder in 1995, the football field was renamed George White Field. The two twin apartment buildings that face the northern side of the football field are the Fontana buildings, which were supposedly built to echo and magnify the sounds of the football games.

Galileo's football team has had three undefeated seasons throughout the school's history. In 1988, the Lions defeated McAteer High School becoming the first football team in San Francisco history to go 12–0. The second undefeated season was in 1990 and the third was in 2002 when the Lions defeated the Washington Eagles.

From the end of the 2006 season through the first game of the 2009 season, Galileo had an 18-game losing streak, going winless in both 2007 (0–7) and 2008 (0–9). After losing the first game of the 2009 season, the Lions won 9 out of their final 11 games, punctuated by a 35–0 win over the Lincoln High School Mustangs in the San Francisco AAA Turkey Bowl, capturing their 16th city championship. Lincoln had won 4 consecutive AAA championships in a row prior to the 2009 season from 2005-2008. It was Galileo's 16th San Francisco AAA championship overall.

Four years later in 2013, the Lions (led by quarterback Kyle Nelson and running back Ronzel Fox) prevailed once again over the Lincoln High Mustangs in the AAA-Turkey Bowl by a score of 34–30. It was Galileo's record 17th city championship.

In 2017, Galileo won the school's 18th city championship and advanced to the state playoffs. The Lions beat the Rio Vista High Rams in the Northern California championship and the Vincent Memorial Scots in the State championship. It was the first state football championship for any San Francisco AAA school.

== Extracurricular ==
Galileo is also home to the FIRST Robotics Competition Team 4669 - Galileo Robotics. Galileo Robotics was founded in 2013 by Galileo’s students and computer science teachers. Since then, Galileo's students work each year to build, program, and design a robot to compete at nearby competitions such as the San Francisco Regional and the East Bay Regional.

== Reputation ==
Galileo previously had a bad reputation for low test scores and criminal events occurring in school, but in more recent years it has become one of the most improved schools in San Francisco (see Academic Performance Index below). Since the installation of surveillance cameras in 2005, criminal acts at Galileo have declined as a serious issue. Math scores remain one of Galileo's best academic strengths.

In 2008, Gerald Courtney, the Assistant Principal at the time, was charged in a prostitution ring. Courtney was accused of helping operate two brothels in San Jose. No minors, school officials or students from the San Francisco Unified School District were involved in the operation, police said. Police also believe Courtney posted advertisements for the prostitution business on online forums.

The Galileo Observer is the quarterly newsletter for the alumni.

== Galileo Songs ==
"Hail, Galileo, Hail" is the Hymn of Galileo Academy of Science & Technology.

Other songs include The Galileo Fight Song, The Big G, and The Lion's Whisper. They are usually performed by the Galileo Cheerleaders or "Lioness". The songs are also performed at Song and Yell, an annual rally that takes place near the beginning of each school year.

== Notable alumni ==
- Johnny Aguirre, Canadian football player
- Joe Angel, '65 sports commentator
- Peter Arnautoff, soccer player.
- Howard Bach, '96 badminton player
- Roy Barni, football player
- Roger Boas, politician, class of 1938
- Ping Bodie, baseball player
- Barbara Bouchet, actress, class of 1962
- Don Bragg, basketball player, class of 1951
- London Breed, Mayor of San Francisco, class of 1992
- Charles de Bretteville, business executive and banker
- Bobby Brown, baseball player, American League President, class of 1942
- Italo Chelini, baseball player
- Raymond Chow, mobster
- Gino Cimoli, baseball player, class of 1947
- Theodore J. Conway, United States Army four-star general, class of 1927
- Al Cowlings, football player, class of 1965
- Frank Crosetti, baseball player
- Dom DiMaggio, baseball player
- Joe DiMaggio, baseball player, dropped out
- Vince DiMaggio, baseball player, dropped out
- Oscar Donahue, football player
- Arthur Dong, filmmaker, class of 1971
- Joe Drake, football player
- Patricia Elsener, Olympic diver
- Art Garibaldi, baseball player
- Theodore Geballe, physicist, class of 1937
- Richard Goldman, co-owner of San Francisco Giants, co-founder of Goldman Prize, class of 1937
- Peter E. Haas, owner Levi Strauss & Co, class of 1935
- Walter A. Haas, Jr., owner Levi Strauss & Co. and owner Oakland Athletics, class of 1932
- Bruce Hale, basketball player
- Ruth Heller, author
- Stan Johnson, baseball player, class of 1956
- Grover Klemmer, USA National Champion and NFL official, class of 1939
- Him Mark Lai, Archivist and historian of Chinese America, class of 1943
- Fred H. Lau, former chief of police for San Francisco
- Tony Lazzeri, baseball player, dropped out
- Bill Lee, author, class of 1972
- Lawson Little, golfer
- Dario Lodigiani, baseball player, class of 1934
- Frank Lucchesi, former Major League Baseball manager, class of 1944
- Hank Luisetti, basketball player, class of 1934
- Milton Marks, Sr. state senator, class of 1937
- Gilbert Milam Jr, rapper, dropped out
- Kyle Nelson, MLB pitcher for the Arizona Diamondbacks
- Andre Nickatina, rapper, dropped out
- John Orofino '41 World War II Hero – 3rd Army, U.S. Cavalry – Operation Overlord
- Marty Passaglia, basketball player, class of 1937
- Marino Pieretti, baseball player
- George Puccinelli, baseball player
- Dino Restelli, baseball player
- John Santos, musician, bandleader, class of 1973
- Fred Scolari, basketball player
- Bobby Shaw, football player, class of 1993
- Arthur Sheehan, soldier and baseball player, class of 1943
- Pat Sheehan, actress and Playboy Playmate of October 1958, class of 1949
- O. J. Simpson, football player, class of 1965
- Norm Thompson, football player
- Dave Toschi, police detective, known for his role as a chief investigator in the Zodiac Killer case
- Vince Tringali, football player, class of 1946
- Lenny Walls, '97 Basketball/Football
- Joan Weldon, actress, class of 1947
- Gene Williams, basketball player
- Walt Williams, baseball player, class of 1963
- Zaytoven, music producer

== Academic Performance Index (API) ==
This system has discontinued and is now being replaced by the School Quality Improvement Index (SQII)

=== Comparison by years (Galileo) ===
Score type	2004–2005	2005–2006	2006–2007	2007–2008	2008–2009	2009–2010	2010–2011
Schoolwide API	744	763	753	742	757	778	790
API statewide rank	8	8	8	8	7	7	7
API similar schools rank	9	8	8	7	3	5	3

=== Comparison with other San Francisco high schools (2013) ===
Score Type	Lowell	Wallenberg	Galileo	Mission	Washington	Lincoln	Burton
Schoolwide API	952	797	778	641	777	767	718
API Statewide Rank	10	?	?		?	?	?
API Similar Schools Rank	10	?	?		?	?	?

== See also ==
- San Francisco County high schools
