= Bones McKinney =

American basketball player and coach (1919–1997)

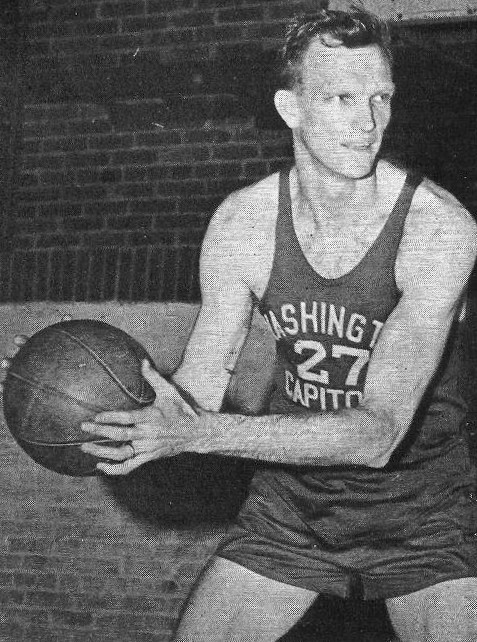
- McKinney in 1949

Personal information
- Born: January 1, 1919 Lowland, North Carolina, U.S.
- Died: May 16, 1997 (aged 78) Raleigh, North Carolina, U.S.
- Listed height: 6 ft 6 in (1.98 m)
- Listed weight: 185 lb (84 kg)

Career information
- High school: Durham (Durham, North Carolina)
- College: NC State (1940–1942); North Carolina (1945–1946)
- Playing career: 1946–1952
- Position: Small forward
- Number: 17, 29
- Coaching career: 1950–1971

Career history

Playing
- 1946–1951: Washington Capitols
- 1951–1952: Boston Celtics

Coaching
- 1950–1951: Washington Capitols
- 1957–1965: Wake Forest
- 1969–1971: Carolina Cougars

Career highlights
- All-BAA First Team (1947); All-BAA Second Team (1949)

Career statistics
- Points: 2,994
- Rebounds: 373
- Assists: 503
- Stats at NBA.com
- Stats at Basketball Reference

Horace Albert "Bones" McKinney (January 1, 1919 – May 16, 1997) was an American professional basketball player and coach.

A 6'6" small forward who played at both North Carolina State University (2 seasons) and the University of North Carolina (1 season, after U.S. Army service during World War II interrupted his college career), McKinney had a six-year playing career in the NBA, most of them with the now-defunct Washington Capitols. He also played for the Boston Celtics. His final year with the Capitols (in the 1950–51 season), McKinney was a player-coach; the team folded midway through the season.

McKinney, known for his sideline antics, would later coach the Wake Forest University Demon Deacons, leading them to two Atlantic Coast Conference titles and an appearance in the Final Four in 1962.

McKinney also coached Carolina Cougars of the American Basketball Association from 1969 through 1971. He coached them to a 42–42 record during the 1969–70 season, good for third place in the East Division. The Cougars then lost in the first round of the 1970 ABA playoffs to the Indiana Pacers, 4 games to 0. As the 1970–71 season got under way, McKinney was named a vice president of the team. After a 17–25 start, halfway through the season McKinney was replaced as head coach by his assistant coach Jerry Steele. Steele also went 17-25 for the remainder of the season for a 34–50 record that failed to get the Cougars into the 1971 ABA playoffs. During the 1970–71 season, McKinney provided color commentary for the television broadcast of the 1971 ABA All Star Game. Subsequently, McKinney would have a long and successful career as a color analyst for television broadcasts of ACC basketball games.

McKinney's picture hangs in the North Carolina History Museum's North Carolina Sports Hall of Fame and one of his basketball jerseys is also displayed there. He was also a graduate of Southeastern Baptist Theological Seminary and an ordained minister of the Southern Baptist Convention.

== BAA/NBA career statistics ==
Legend
GP	Games played	MPG	Minutes per game
FG%	Field-goal percentage	FT%	Free-throw percentage
RPG	Rebounds per game	APG	Assists per game
PPG	Points per game	**Bold**	Career high

=== Regular season ===
Year	Team	GP	MPG	FG%	FT%	RPG	APG	PPG
1946–47	Washington	58	–	.279	.690	–	1.2	12.0
1947–48	Washington	43	–	.268	.644	–	.8	11.3
1948–49	Washington	57	–	**.328**	.706	–	2.0	**12.7**
1949–50	Washington	53	–	.296	.776	–	1.7	9.3
1950–51	Washington	10	–	.279	.429	1.9	.6	2.7
1950–51	Boston	34	–	.317	.743	**5.3**	**2.3**	6.9
1951–52	Boston	**63**	**17.2**	.325	**.813**	2.8	1.8	5.3
Career		318	17.2	.298	.711	3.5	1.6	9.4

=== Playoffs ===
Year	Team	GP	MPG	FG%	FT%	RPG	APG	PPG
1947	Washington	6	–	.212	.647	–	.5	9.7
1949	Washington	**10**	–	.354	.731	–	.9	12.8
1950	Washington	2	–	.273	**.800**	–	1.5	8.0
1951	Boston	2	–	**.440**	**.800**	**5.0**	**4.0**	**13.0**
1952	Boston	3	**6.7**	.222	.000	2.0	.7	1.3
Career		23	6.7	.306	.708	3.2	1.1	10.1

== Head coaching record ==
=== College ===
Record table
Season	Team	Overall	Conference	Standing	Postseason
Wake Forest Demon Deacons (Atlantic Coast Conference) (1957–1965)
1957–58	Wake Forest	6–17	3–11	T–7th	
1958–59	Wake Forest	10–14	5–9	T–6th	
1959–60	Wake Forest	21–7	12–2	T–1st	
1960–61	Wake Forest	19–11	11–3	2nd	NCAA University Division Regional Final
1961–62	Wake Forest	22–9	12–2	1st	NCAA University Division Third Place
1962–63	Wake Forest	16–10	11–3	2nd	
1963–64	Wake Forest	16–11	9–5	2nd	
1964–65	Wake Forest	12–15	6–8	5th	
Wake Forest:		122–94	69–43		
Total:		122–94			
National champion Postseason invitational champion Conference regular season champion Conference regular season and conference tournament champion Division regular season champion Division regular season and conference tournament champion Conference tournament champion

=== NBA/ABA ===
Legend
Regular season	G	Games coached	W	Games won	L	Games lost	W–L %	Win–loss %
Playoffs	PG	Playoff games	PW	Playoff wins	PL	Playoff losses	PW–L %	Playoff win–loss %

Team	Year	G	W	L	W–L%	Finish	PG	PW	PL	PW–L%	Result
Washington	1950–51	35	10	25	.286	folded	—	—	—	—	—
Carolina (ABA)	1969–70	84	42	42	.500	3rd in Eastern	4	0	4	.000	Lost in division semifinals
Carolina (ABA)	1970–71	42	17	25	.405	(fired)	—	—	—	—	—
Career (ABA)		126	59	67	.468		4	0	4	.000	
Career (overall)		161	69	92	.429		4	0	4	.000	

== See also ==
- List of NCAA Division I Men's Final Four appearances by coach
