= Bob Feerick =

American basketball player, coach, executive

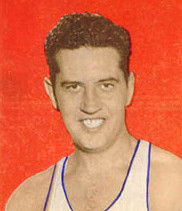
- Feerick in 1948

Personal information
- Born: January 2, 1920 San Francisco, California, U.S.
- Died: June 8, 1976 (aged 56) San Francisco, California, U.S.
- Listed height: 6 ft 3 in (1.91 m)
- Listed weight: 190 lb (86 kg)

Career information
- High school: Lowell (San Francisco, California)
- College: Santa Clara (1938–1941)
- Playing career: 1946–1950
- Position: Small forward / shooting guard
- Number: 10
- Coaching career: 1949–1963

Career history

Playing
- 1945–1946: Oshkosh All-Stars
- 1946–1950: Washington Capitols

Coaching
- 1949–1950: Washington Capitols
- 1950–1962: Santa Clara
- 1962–1963: San Francisco Warriors

Career highlights
- As player: 2× All-BAA First Team (1947, 1948); All-BAA Second Team (1949); No. 5 retired by Santa Clara Broncos; As coach: 3× WCAC Coach of the Year (1953, 1954, 1960)

Career NBA playing statistics
- Points: 2,936 (13.3 ppg)
- Assists: 440 (2.0 apg)
- Stats at NBA.com
- Stats at Basketball Reference

Career coaching record
- NBA: 63–85 (.426)
- College: 186–120 (.608)
- Record at Basketball Reference

Robert Joseph Feerick (January 2, 1920 – June 8, 1976) was an American professional basketball player, coach and general manager. He was born in San Francisco, California at the old French Hospital, attended Star of the Sea Catholic school and old Lowell High school.

== Playing career ==
A 6'3" guard from Santa Clara University, Feerick played for the Washington Capitols from 1946 to 1950, the NBA's first four seasons of existence (the league was known as the Basketball Association of America during the first three). Playing under coach Red Auerbach, he was named to the All-NBA first team in 1947 and 1948 after averaging 16.8 (second in the league behind Joe Fulks's 23.1) and 16.1 points per game respectively. In 1949, the league's first season as the newly formed NBA, the Capitols named Feerick player-coach. In 221 games, he scored 2936 points for an average of 13.3 per game.

== Post-playing years ==
After his short professional career, Feerick returned to Santa Clara as head coach of its basketball team from 1950 to 1962. Feerick also was Wilt Chamberlain's personal coach with the San Francisco Warriors during the 1962–63 season. The franchise had just relocated from Philadelphia and hired Feerick, the native San Franciscan, to replace Frank McGuire, who resigned rather than make the move with the team. The Warriors finished 31–49 for their first year in San Francisco after losing to the Boston Celtics in each of the previous three Eastern Division finals.

The following season, Alex Hannum replaced Feerick as coach. Feerick later served the Warriors as general manager and director of player personnel. He was a finalist for the NBA 25th Anniversary Team in 1971. He is one of only two members nominated to the team not in the Naismith Basketball Hall of Fame.

Feerick died in 1976

== BAA/NBA career statistics ==
Legend
GP	Games played	FG%	Field-goal percentage
FT%	Free-throw percentage	APG	Assists per game
PPG	Points per game	**Bold**	Career high

*	Led the league

=== Regular season ===
Year	Team	GP	FG%	FT%	APG	PPG
1946–47	Washington	55	**.401***	.762	1.3	**16.8**
1947–48	Washington	48	.340	.788	1.2	16.1
1948–49	Washington	58	.350	**.859**	**3.2**	13.0
1949–50	Washington	**60**	.344	.799	2.1	8.1
Career		221	.362	.805	2.0	13.3

=== Playoffs ===
Year	Team	GP	FG%	FT%	APG	PPG
1947	Washington	**6**	**.318**	.741	1.0	**15.0**
1948	Washington	1	.000	**1.000**	1.0	2.0
1949	Washington	2	.250	.750	**3.0**	4.5
Career		9	.311	.758	1.4	11.2

== Head coaching record ==
=== College ===
Record table
Season	Team	Overall	Conference	Standing	Postseason
**Santa Clara Broncos** (Independent) (1950–1952)
1950–51	Santa Clara	9–15			
1951–52	Santa Clara	17–12			NCAA Fourth Place
**Santa Clara Broncos** (West Coast Conference) (1952–1962)
1952–53	Santa Clara	17–7	6–2	T–1st	NCAA Elite Eight
1953–54	Santa Clara	20–7	9–3	1st	NCAA Elite Eight
1954–55	Santa Clara	13–11	6–6	3rd	
1955–56	Santa Clara	8–16	6–8	6th	
1956–57	Santa Clara	15–7	10–4	T–2nd	
1957–58	Santa Clara	13–11	6–6	3rd	
1958–59	Santa Clara	16–9	9–3	2nd	
1959–60	Santa Clara	21–10	9–3	1st	NCAA Sweet Sixteen
1960–61	Santa Clara	18–9	8–4	T–2nd	
1961–62	Santa Clara	19–6	8–4	T–2nd	
Santa Clara:		186–120 (.608)	77–43 (.642)		
Total:		186–120 (.608)			
National champion Postseason invitational champion Conference regular season champion Conference regular season and conference tournament champion Division regular season champion Division regular season and conference tournament champion Conference tournament champion

=== Professional ===
Legend
Regular season	G	Games coached	W	Games won	L	Games lost	W–L %	Win–loss %
Playoffs	PG	Playoff games	PW	Playoff wins	PL	Playoff losses	PW–L %	Playoff win–loss %

Team	Year	G	W	L	W–L%	Finish	PG	PW	PL	PW–L%	Result
WSC	1949–50	68	32	36	.471	3rd in Eastern	2	0	2	.000	Lost in Eastern Div. Semifinals
SFW	1962–63	80	31	49	.388	4th in Western	-	-	-	-	Missed Playoffs
**Career**		148	63	85	.426		2	0	2	.000	

== See also ==
- List of NCAA Division I Men's Final Four appearances by coach
