= Washington Capitols =

- Division: Eastern
- Founded: 1946
- Folded: 1952
- History: Washington Capitols; 1946–1949 (BAA); 1949–1951 (NBA); 1951–1952 (ABL)
- Arena: Uline Arena
- Location: Washington, D.C.
- Team colors: Green, white
- Division titles: BAA: 2 (1947, 1949)

The Washington Capitols were an American professional basketball team based in Washington, D.C. from 1946 to 1951 that played in the Basketball Association of America, the National Basketball Association and the American Basketball League. The team was coached from 1946 to 1949 by NBA Hall of Famer Red Auerbach and owned by entrepreneur Mike Uline, who immigrated to the US from the Netherlands at age 16.

== History ==
The team was founded in 1946 as a charter BAA team; it became a charter NBA team in 1949. It folded on January 9, 1951 (with a 10–25 record).

The Capitols were one of seven teams that quickly left the NBA: The NBA contracted after the 1949–1950 season, losing six teams: The Anderson Packers, Sheboygan Red Skins and Waterloo Hawks jumped to the NPBL, while the Chicago Stags, Denver Nuggets and St. Louis Bombers folded. The league went from 17 teams to 11 before the 1950–1951 season started. Midway through the 1950–1951 season, the Washington Capitols folded as well, bringing the number of teams in the league down to ten.

Earl Lloyd, the first African American athlete to play for an NBA team, debuted for the Capitols in Rochester, New York on October 31, 1950.

The franchise played the 1951–52 season in the American Basketball League, but the team folded again on January 11, 1952. The main reason why the team folded for the second time was related to them and the ABL being sued by the NBA if the new Capitols tried to take the NBA team name's history from them as well.

The teams wore green and white. The NBA returned to the Washington, D.C. area in 1973, when the Baltimore Bullets became the Capital Bullets, and later Washington Bullets, now known as the Washington Wizards.

The Capitols' 81.7 win percentage in the BAA's inaugural season was the highest in the NBA until surpassed by the Philadelphia 76ers in 1966–67. The Capitols captured two Divisional Championships: (1946–47 and 1948–49) and technically made the playoffs in all of the seasons they were able to play in full (1947, 1948 tie-breaker, 1949 and 1950).

== Winning streaks ==
The Washington Capitols are also noteworthy for two long win streaks during their short history. In 1946, the Capitols won 17 straight games — a single season streak that remained the BAA/NBA's longest until 1969. The 15–0 start of the 1948–49 team was the best in BAA/NBA history until the Golden State Warriors broke it in 2015–16 by starting 24–0, though the Houston Rockets had previously tied the Capitols' record in 1993–94, and later, tied by the Cleveland Cavaliers in 2024–25.

== The arena ==
The Capitols played in historic Uline Arena, located at 1132, 1140, and 1146 3rd St. NE, Washington, District of Columbia. The capacity was 7,500. The facility still exists and has been repurposed into retail and office space.

== Players of note ==
=== Basketball Hall of Fame ===
Washington Capitols Hall of Famers
Players
No.	Name	Position	Tenure	Inducted
10	Bill Sharman	G	1950–1951	1976
Coaches
Name		Position	Tenure	Inducted
Red Auerbach		Head coach	1947–1949	1969
Contributors
Name		Position	Tenure	Inducted
Earl Lloyd ^{1}		F	1950–1951	2003

Notes:

- ^{1} Lloyd was inducted as a contributor as the first African American player and bench coach in the NBA.

=== Notable alumni ===
- Gene Gallette (1946–1947)
- Jack Nichols (1949–1950)
- Don Otten (1949–1951)
- Fred Scolari (1946–1951)

== Leading scorers by season ==
- 1947 – Bob Feerick – 16.8 ppg
- 1948 – Bob Feerick – 16.1 ppg
- 1949 – Bob Feerick – 13.0 ppg
- 1950 – Don Otten – 14.9 ppg (in 18 games. Jack Nichols scored 13.1 over 49 games, but Fred Scolari scored the most points, with 860 in 66 games.)
- 1951 – Bill Sharman – 12.2 ppg

== Coaches and others ==
- 1947–1949 – Red Auerbach
- 1950 – Bob Feerick – player-coach
- 1951 – Bones McKinney – player-coach
- 1950 – Earl Lloyd – first African American to play in the NBA

== Season-by-season records ==
BAA/NBA champions	Division champions	Playoff berth

Season	League	Division	Finish	Wins	Losses	Win%	GB	Playoffs	Awards
1946–47	BAA	Eastern	1st †	49	11	.817	—	Lost BAA Semifinals (Stags) 2–4	
1947–48	BAA	Western	4th	28	20	.583	1	Lost Division Tiebreaker (Stags)	
1948–49	BAA	Eastern	1st	38	22	.633	—	Won Division semifinals (Warriors) 2–0; Won Division finals (Knicks) 2–1; Lost BAA Finals (Lakers) 2–4	
1949–50	NBA	Eastern	3rd	32	36	.471	21	Lost Division semifinals (Knicks) 0–2	
1950–51 ‡	NBA	Eastern	6th	10	25	.286	30		
1951–52 ‡	ABL	—	7th	15	7	.682	13		
Regular season record				172	121	.587	1946–1952		
Playoff record				8	12	.400	Postseason Series Record: 2–4		

† The inaugural 1947 BAA Playoffs did not establish Eastern and Western champions and generated one finalist from the East, one from the West, only by coincidence. Washington and Chicago won the Eastern and Western Divisions and met in a best-of-seven series to determine one league championship finalist. (Washington lost the first two games, both at home, by 16 points each and lost the series four games to two; every game but the last was decided by at least 10 points.) Meanwhile, four runners-up played best-of-three matches to determine the other finalist. Philadelphia, second in the East, won that runners-up bracket and defeated Chicago in a best-of-seven series to win the BAA championship.

‡ The Capitols folded midway during the season on January 9, 1951 and January 11, 1952 respectively.
