= Boston Celtics all-time roster =

The following is a list of players, both past and current, who appeared in at least one regular season or playoff game for the Boston Celtics NBA franchise.

== Players ==
Note: Statistics are correct through the end of the regular 2025–26 season.

G	Guard	G/F	Guard-forward	F	Forward	F/C	Forward-center	C	Center

legend
^	Denotes player who has been inducted to the Naismith Memorial Basketball Hall of Fame
*	Denotes player who has been selected for at least one All-Star Game with the Boston Celtics and is currently on the team roster
^{+}	Denotes player who has been selected for at least one All-Star Game with the Boston Celtics
^{x}	Denotes player who is currently on the Boston Celtics roster
0.0	Denotes the Boston Celtics statistics leader (min. 100 games played for the team for per-game statistics)

=== A to B ===
All-time roster
Player	Pos.	Pre-draft team	Yrs	Seasons	Statistics									Ref.
Player	Pos.	Pre-draft team	Yrs	Seasons	GP	MP	REB	AST	PTS	MPG	RPG	APG	PPG	Ref.
Alaa Abdelnaby	F/C	Duke	2	1992–1994	76	1,311	346	20	578	17.3	4.6	0.3	7.6	
Zaid Abdul-Aziz	F/C	Iowa State	1	1977–1978	2	24	15	3	8	12.0	7.5	1.5	4.0	
Mark Acres	F/C	Oral Roberts	2	1987–1989	141	1,783	416	61	424	12.6	3.0	0.4	3.0	
Danny Ainge^{+}	G	BYU	8	1981–1989	556	15,603	1,534	2,422	6,257	28.1	2.8	4.4	11.3	
Kadeem Allen	G	Arizona	1	2017–2018	18	107	11	12	19	5.9	0.6	0.7	1.1	
Ray Allen^	G	UConn	5	2007–2012	358	12,774	1,215	981	5,987	35.7	3.4	2.7	16.7	
Tony Allen	G/F	Oklahoma State	6	2004–2010	336	6,194	873	439	2,423	18.4	2.6	1.3	7.2	
Jerome Anderson	G	West Virginia	1	1975–1976	22	126	13	6	61	5.7	0.6	0.3	2.8	
Kenny Anderson	G	Georgia Tech	5	1997–2002	241	7,268	715	1,250	2,717	30.2	3.0	5.2	11.3	
Joel Anthony	C	UNLV	1	2013–2014	21	149	31	2	22	7.1	1.5	0.1	1.0	
Nate Archibald^	G	UTEP	5	1978–1983	363	11,324	683	2,563	4,550	31.2	1.9	7.1	12.5	
Jim Ard	F/C	Cincinnati	4	1974–1978	204	2,550	788	142	753	12.5	3.9	0.7	3.7	
Carlos Arroyo	G	FIU	1	2010–2011	15	190	23	25	36	12.7	1.5	1.7	2.4	
Chucky Atkins	G	South Florida	1	2003–2004	24	793	45	128	289	33.0	1.9	5.3	12.0	
Dennis Awtrey	C	Santa Clara	1	1978–1979	23	247	47	20	50	10.7	2.0	0.9	2.2	
Chris Babb	G	Iowa State	1	2013–2014	14	132	17	3	22	9.4	1.2	0.2	1.6	
Johnny Bach	G/F	Fordham	1	1948–1949	34			25	119			0.7	3.5	
John Bagley	G	Boston College	3	1989–1990; 1991–1993	137	2,934	257	796	777	21.4	1.9	5.8	5.7	
Vin Baker	F	Hartford	2	2002–2004	89	1,942	408	83	688	21.8	4.6	0.9	7.7	
Marcus Banks	G	UNLV	3	2003–2006	180	2,799	278	362	951	15.6	1.5	2.0	5.3	
Dalano Banton^{x}	G	Nebraska	2	2023–2024; 2025–2026	28	223	39	28	62	8.0	1.4	1.0	2.2	
Leandro Barbosa	G	(Brazil) Bauru Basket	1	2012–2013	41	513	46	58	215	12.5	1.1	1.4	5.2	
Tom Barker	F/C	Hawaii	1	1978–1979	12	131	30	6	53	10.9	2.5	0.5	4.4	
Don Barksdale^	F/C	UCLA	2	1953–1955	135	3,148	890	246	1,215	23.3	6.6	1.8	9.0	
Jim Barnes	F/C	UTEP	2	1968–1970	126	1,644	544	79	700	13.0	4.3	0.6	5.6	
Marvin Barnes	F/C	Providence	1	1978–1979	38	796	177	53	309	20.9	4.7	1.4	8.1	
Jim Barnett	G/F	Oregon	1	1966–1967	48	383	53	41	198	8.0	1.1	0.9	4.1	
Ernie Barrett	G/F	Kansas State	2	1953–1954; 1955–1956	131	2,092	343	229	641	16.0	2.6	1.7	4.9	
Dana Barros	G	Boston College	6	1995–2000; 2003–2004	307	7,028	597	1,014	3,109	22.9	1.9	3.3	10.1	
Brandon Bass	F	LSU	4	2011–2015	304	8,302	1,658	330	3,216	27.3	5.5	1.1	10.6	
Charles Bassey	C	Western Kentucky	1	2025–2026	5	17	6	0	14	3.4	1.2	0.0	2.8	
Tony Battie	F/C	Texas Tech	6	1998–2004	336	7,474	1,975	237	2,269	22.2	5.9	0.7	6.8	
Kenny Battle	F	Illinois	2	1991–1993	11	75	20	2	28	6.8	1.8	0.2	2.5	
Jerryd Bayless	G	Arizona	1	2013–2014	41	1,036	86	128	416	25.3	2.1	3.1	10.1	
Aron Baynes	C	Washington State	2	2017–2019	132	2,306	674	150	766	17.5	5.1	1.1	5.8	
Moe Becker	G/F	Duquesne	1	1946–1947	6			1	13			0.2	2.2	
Hank Beenders	F/C	LIU Brooklyn	1	1948–1949	8			3	19			0.4	2.4	
Bob Bigelow	G/F	Penn	1	1977–1978	4	17	4	0	6	4.3	1.0	0.0	1.5	
Chauncey Billups^	G	Colorado	1	1997–1998	51	1,296	113	217	565	25.4	2.2	4.3	11.1	
Dave Bing^	G	Syracuse	1	1977–1978	80	2,256	212	300	1,088	28.2	2.7	3.8	13.6	
Jabari Bird	G	California	1	2017–2018	13	115	19	8	39	8.8	1.5	0.6	3.0	
Larry Bird^ (#33)	F	Indiana State	13	1979–1992	897	34,443	8,974	5,695	21,791	38.4	10.0	6.3	24.3	
Otis Birdsong	G	Houston	1	1988–1989	13	108	13	9	37	8.3	1.0	0.7	2.8	
James Blackwell	G	Dartmouth	1	1994–1995	9	61	8	6	14	6.8	0.9	0.7	1.6	
Mike Bloom	F/C	Temple	1	1947–1948	14			14	129			1.0	9.2	
Mark Blount	C	Pittsburgh	6	2000–2006	338	7,646	1,589	333	2,561	22.6	4.7	1.0	7.6	
Vander Blue	G	Marquette	1	2013–2014	3	15	3	1	5	5.0	1.0	0.3	1.7	
Keith Bogans	G/F	Kentucky	1	2013–2014	6	55	3	3	12	9.2	0.5	0.5	2.0	
Ron Bonham	F	Cincinnati	2	1964–1966	76	681	113	30	478	9.0	1.5	0.4	6.3	
Tom Boswell	F/C	South Carolina	3	1975–1978	170	2,507	665	172	1,005	14.7	3.9	1.0	5.9	
Chris Boucher	F	Oregon	1	2025–2026	9	94	18	3	21	10.4	2.0	0.3	2.3	
Bruce Bowen	F	Cal State Fullerton	2	1997–1999	91	1,799	226	109	410	19.8	2.5	1.2	4.5	
Harry Boykoff	C	St. John's	1	1950–1951	32		135	40	201		4.2	1.3	6.3	
Avery Bradley	G	Texas	7	2010–2017	413	11,619	1,264	703	5,008	28.1	3.1	1.7	12.1	
Charles Bradley	G	Wyoming	2	1981–1983	102	871	116	50	336	8.5	1.1	0.5	3.3	
Bob Brannum	F/C	Michigan State	4	1951–1955	279	6,576	1,944	494	1,742	23.6	7.0	1.8	6.2	
Carl Braun^	G/F	Colgate	1	1961–1962	48	414	50	71	176	8.6	1.0	1.5	3.7	
J. R. Bremer	G	St. Bonaventure	1	2002–2003	64	1,503	145	164	528	23.5	2.3	2.6	8.3	
Frank Brickowski	F/C	Penn State	1	1996–1997	17	255	34	15	81	15.0	2.0	0.9	4.8	
Al Brightman	F	Charleston	1	1946–1947	58			60	567			1.0	9.8	
Oshae Brissett	F	Syracuse	1	2023–2024	55	630	160	44	201	11.5	2.9	.8	3.7	
Malcolm Brogdon	G	Virginia	1	2022–2023	67	1,744	280	248	1,000	26.0	4.2	3.7	14.9	
MarShon Brooks	G/F	Providence	1	2013–2014	10	73	19	4	31	7.3	1.9	0.4	3.1	
Dee Brown	G	Jacksonville	8	1990–1998	476	13,665	1,302	1,883	5,512	28.7	2.7	4.0	11.6	
Jaylen Brown*	G/F	California	10	2016–2026	674	20,908	3,700	1,953	13,474	31.0	5.5	2.9	20.0	
Kedrick Brown	G	Northwest Florida State	3	2001–2004	101	1,319	258	60	318	13.1	2.6	0.6	3.1	
P. J. Brown	F/C	Louisiana Tech	1	2007–2008	18	209	68	10	39	11.6	3.8	0.6	2.2	
Randy Brown	G	New Mexico State	2	2000–2002	55	1,244	99	156	223	22.6	1.8	2.8	4.1	
Rick Brunson	G	Temple	1	2000–2001	7	142	9	24	26	20.3	1.3	3.4	3.7	
Em Bryant	G	DePaul	2	1968–1970	151	3,005	461	407	1,014	19.9	3.1	2.7	6.7	
Mark Bryant	F/C	Seton Hall	1	2002–2003	2	9	2	1	0	4.5	1.0	0.5	0.0	
Quinn Buckner	G	Indiana	3	1982–1985	226	3,672	411	637	1,074	16.2	1.8	2.8	4.8	
Junior Burrough	F	Virginia	1	1995–1996	61	495	109	15	189	8.1	1.8	0.2	3.1	
Al Butler	G	Niagara	1	1961–1962	5	47	13	4	31	9.4	2.6	0.8	6.2	

=== C ===
All-time roster
Player	Pos.	Pre-draft team	Yrs	Seasons	Statistics									Ref.
Player	Pos.	Pre-draft team	Yrs	Seasons	GP	MP	REB	AST	PTS	MPG	RPG	APG	PPG	Ref.
Rick Carlisle	G	Virginia	3	1984–1987	157	1,236	128	164	346	7.9	0.8	1.0	2.2	
Chris Carr	G	Southern Illinois	1	2000–2001	35	309	44	11	169	8.8	1.3	0.3	4.8	
M. L. Carr	G/F	Guilford	6	1979–1985	363	5,810	818	484	2,285	16.0	2.3	1.3	6.3	
Sam Cassell	G	Florida State	1	2007–2008	17	299	31	35	130	17.6	1.8	2.1	7.6	
Justin Champagnie	G/F	Pittsburgh	1	2022–2023	2	23	4	3	5	11.5	2.0	1.5	2.5	
Don Chaney	G	Houston	10	1968–1975; 1977–1980	652	14,865	2,572	1,268	5,689	22.8	3.9	1.9	8.7	
Calbert Cheaney	G/F	Indiana	1	1999–2000	67	1,309	138	80	267	19.5	2.1	1.2	4.0	
Carlos Clark	G	Ole Miss	2	1983–1985	93	689	86	65	223	7.4	0.9	0.7	2.4	
Coty Clarke	F	Arkansas	1	2015–2016	3	6	1	0	6	2.0	0.3	0.0	2.0	
Charles Claxton	C	Georgia	1	1995–1996	3	7	2	0	2	2.3	0.7	0.0	0.7	
Ben Clyde	F	Florida State	1	1974–1975	25	157	41	5	69	6.3	1.6	0.2	2.8	
Bimbo Coles	G	Virginia Tech	1	2002–2003	14	175	11	16	52	12.5	0.8	1.1	3.7	
Jason Collins	C	Stanford	1	2012–2013	32	330	52	6	37	10.3	1.6	0.2	1.2	
Gene Conley	F/C	Washington State	4	1952–1953; 1958–1961	235	3,696	1,587	110	1,247	15.7	6.8	0.5	5.3	
Marty Conlon	F/C	Providence	1	1996–1997	74	1,614	323	104	574	21.8	4.4	1.4	7.8	
Chuck Connors	F/C	Seton Hall	2	1946–1948	53			41	239			0.8	4.5	
Norm Cook	F	Kansas	1	1976–1977	25	138	27	5	63	5.5	1.1	0.2	2.5	
Chuck Cooper^	F	Duquesne	4	1950–1954	272	5,071	1,807	494	1,850	24.6	6.6	1.8	6.8	
Chris Corchiani	G	NC State	1	1993–1994	51	467	44	86	117	9.2	0.9	1.7	2.3	
Mel Counts	F/C	Oregon State	2	1964–1966	121	1,593	697	69	820	13.2	5.8	0.6	6.8	
Bob Cousy^ (#14)	G	Holy Cross	13	1950–1963	917	30,131	4,781	6,945	16,955	35.5	5.2	7.6	18.5	
Dave Cowens^ (#18)	F/C	Florida State	10	1970–1980	726	28,551	10,170	2,828	13,192	39.3	14.0	3.9	18.2	
Torrey Craig	F	USC Upstate	1	2024–2025	17	201	48	12	46	11.8	2.8	0.7	2.7	
Jordan Crawford	G	Xavier	2	2012–2014	66	1,780	194	292	782	27.0	2.9	4.4	11.8	
Harold Crisler	F	Iowa State	1	1946–1947	4			0	6			0.0	1.5	
Jae Crowder	F	Marquette	3	2014–2017	202	6,025	1,052	372	2,576	29.8	5.2	1.8	12.8	

=== D ===
All-time roster
Player	Pos.	Pre-draft team	Yrs	Seasons	Statistics									Ref.
Player	Pos.	Pre-draft team	Yrs	Seasons	GP	MP	REB	AST	PTS	MPG	RPG	APG	PPG	Ref.
Marquis Daniels	G/F	Auburn	3	2009–2012	138	2,359	274	177	680	17.1	2.0	1.3	4.9	
Luigi Datome	F	(Italy) Virtus Roma	1	2014–2015	18	192	25	7	94	10.7	1.4	0.4	5.2	
Glen Davis	F/C	LSU	4	2007–2011	277	5,808	1,139	224	2,098	21.0	4.1	0.8	7.6	
Ricky Davis	G	Iowa	3	2003–2006	181	6,121	673	615	2,940	33.8	3.7	3.4	16.2	
JD Davison	G	Alabama	3	2022–2025	36	198	32	34	68	5.5	0.9	0.9	1.9	
Tony Dawson	F	Florida State	1	1994–1995	2	13	3	1	8	6.5	1.5	0.5	4.0	
Todd Day	G/F	Arkansas	2	1995–1997	152	3,913	532	219	2,027	25.7	3.5	1.4	13.3	
Darren Daye	G/F	UCLA	2	1986–1988	108	1,379	200	146	519	12.8	1.9	1.4	4.8	
Andrew DeClercq	F/C	Florida	2	1997–1999	95	1,781	455	69	514	18.7	4.8	0.7	5.4	
Tony Delk	G	Kentucky	2	2001–2003	89	2,443	311	197	816	27.4	3.5	2.2	9.2	
Dan Dickau	G	Gonzaga	1	2005–2006	19	234	16	40	62	12.3	0.8	2.1	3.3	
Dick Dickey	G	NC State	1	1951–1952	45	440	81	50	127	9.8	1.8	1.1	2.8	
Ernie DiGregorio	G	Providence	1	1977–1978	27	274	27	66	106	10.1	1.0	2.4	3.9	
Bill Dinwiddie	F	New Mexico Highlands	1	1970–1971	61	717	209	34	300	11.8	3.4	0.6	4.9	
Bob Doll	F/C	Colorado	2	1948–1950	94			225	685			2.4	7.3	
Bob Donham	G/F	Ohio State	4	1950–1954	273	4,866	1,071	706	1,818	23.7	3.9	2.6	6.7	
Keyon Dooling	G	Missouri	1	2011–2012	46	662	39	51	182	14.4	0.8	1.1	4.0	
Sherman Douglas	G	Syracuse	5	1991–1996	269	7,657	605	1,829	2,981	28.5	2.2	6.8	11.1	
Steve Downing	C	Indiana	2	1973–1975	27	146	41	11	64	5.4	1.5	0.4	2.4	
PJ Dozier	G	South Carolina	1	2018–2019	6	51	17	5	19	8.5	2.8	0.8	3.2	
Nate Driggers	G	Montevallo	1	1996–1997	15	132	22	6	36	8.8	1.5	0.4	2.4	
Terry Duerod	G	Detroit Mercy	2	1980–1982	53	260	20	18	151	4.9	0.4	0.3	2.8	
Bob Duffy	F	Tulane	1	1946–1947	6			0	8			0.0	1.3	
Andy Duncan	F/C	William & Mary	1	1950–1951	14		30	8	29		2.1	0.6	2.1	

=== E to F ===
All-time roster
Player	Pos.	Pre-draft team	Yrs	Seasons	Statistics									Ref.
Player	Pos.	Pre-draft team	Yrs	Seasons	GP	MP	REB	AST	PTS	MPG	RPG	APG	PPG	Ref.
Acie Earl	F/C	Iowa	2	1993–1995	104	1,357	292	14	476	13.0	2.8	0.1	4.6	
Jarell Eddie	G/F	Virginia Tech	1	2017–2018	2	6	1	0	0	3.0	0.5	0.0	0.0	
Tyus Edney	G	UCLA	1	1997–1998	52	623	55	139	277	12.0	1.1	2.7	5.3	
Blue Edwards	G/F	East Carolina	1	1994–1995	31	507	65	47	220	16.4	2.1	1.5	7.1	
Carsen Edwards	G	Purdue	2	2019–2021	68	627	73	38	244	9.2	1.1	0.6	3.2	
Bulbs Ehlers	G/F	Purdue	2	1947–1949	99			177	800			1.8	8.1	
Don Eliason	F	Hamline	1	1946–1947	1			0	0			0.0	0.0	
Pervis Ellison	F/C	Louisville	5	1994–1998; 1999–2000	193	3,355	962	144	908	17.4	5.0	0.7	4.7	
Wayne Embry^	F/C	Miami (OH)	2	1966–1968	150	1,817	615	94	871	12.1	4.1	0.6	5.8	
Gene Englund	F/C	Wisconsin	1	1949–1950	24			17	196			0.7	8.2	
Semih Erden	C	(Turkey) Fenerbahçe	1	2010–2011	37	531	107	19	150	14.4	2.9	0.5	4.1	
Johnny Ezersky	G/F	Rhode Island	2	1948–1950	34			51	292			1.5	8.6	
Tacko Fall	C	UCF	2	2019–2021	26	169	67	4	70	6.5	2.6	0.2	2.7	
Phil Farbman	F	CCNY	1	1948–1949	21			18	72			0.9	3.4	
Vítor Faverani	C	(Spain) Baloncesto Málaga	1	2013–2014	37	488	128	16	164	13.2	3.5	0.4	4.4	
Warren Fenley	F	Manhattan	1	1946–1947	33			16	85			0.5	2.6	
Bruno Fernando	F/C	Maryland	1	2021–2022	20	58	15	4	19	2.9	0.8	0.2	1.0	
Eric Fernsten	F/C	San Francisco	3	1979–1982	144	912	200	46	328	6.3	1.4	0.3	2.3	
Hank Finkel	C	Dayton	6	1969–1975	436	5,277	1,605	328	2,005	12.1	3.7	0.8	4.6	
Michael Finley	G/F	Wisconsin	1	2009–2010	21	314	33	24	109	15.0	1.6	1.1	5.2	
Malik Fitts	F	Saint Mary's	1	2021–2022	8	28	7	5	15	3.5	0.9	0.6	1.9	
Jack Foley	F	Holy Cross	1	1962–1963	5	46	7	0	32	9.2	1.4	0.0	6.4	
Chris Ford	G/F	Villanova	4	1978–1982	309	9,058	708	1,021	3,194	29.3	2.3	3.3	10.3	
Joseph Forte	G	North Carolina	1	2001–2002	8	39	6	6	6	4.9	0.8	0.8	0.8	
Danny Fortson	F	Cincinnati	1	1999–2000	55	856	366	29	419	15.6	6.7	0.5	7.6	
Evan Fournier	G/F	(France) Poitiers Basket 86	1	2020–2021	16	472	53	49	208	29.5	3.3	3.1	13.0	
Rick Fox	G/F	North Carolina	6	1991–1997	444	10,990	1,733	1,250	4,759	24.8	3.9	2.8	10.7	
Enes Freedom	C	(Turkey) Fenerbahçe	2	2019–2020; 2021–2022	93	1,394	591	64	597	15.0	6.4	0.7	6.4	

=== G ===
All-time roster
Player	Pos.	Pre-draft team	Yrs	Seasons	Statistics									Ref.
Player	Pos.	Pre-draft team	Yrs	Seasons	GP	MP	REB	AST	PTS	MPG	RPG	APG	PPG	Ref.
Kevin Gamble	G/F	Iowa	6	1988–1994	436	10,988	1,112	1,003	4,895	25.2	2.6	2.3	11.2	
Jack Garfinkel	G	St. John's	3	1946–1949	92			134	476			1.5	5.2	
Kevin Garnett^ (#5)	F/C	Farragut Academy (IL)	6	2007–2013	396	12,266	3,301	1,078	6,233	31.0	8.3	2.7	15.7	
Marlon Garnett	G	Santa Clara	1	1998–1999	24	205	21	18	51	8.5	0.9	0.8	2.1	
Luka Garza^{x}	C	Iowa	1	2025–2026	69	1,118	281	66	557	16.2	4.1	1.0	8.1	
Hoot Gibson	F/C	Creighton	1	1949–1950	2			1	7			0.5	3.5	
Jonathan Gibson	G	New Mexico State	1	2017–2018	4	40	3	4	34	10.0	0.8	1.0	8.5	
J. R. Giddens	G	New Mexico	2	2008–2010	27	107	23	6	28	4.0	0.9	0.2	1.0	
Artis Gilmore^	C	Jacksonville	1	1987–1988	47	521	148	12	164	11.1	3.1	0.3	3.5	
Clarence Glover	F	Western Kentucky	1	1971–1972	25	119	46	4	65	4.8	1.8	0.2	2.6	
Ryan Gomes	F	Providence	2	2005–2007	134	3,651	705	177	1,342	27.2	5.3	1.3	10.0	
Hugo González^{x}	G/F	(Spain) Real Madrid	1	2025–2026	74	1,084	246	40	289	14.6	3.3	0.5	3.9	
Mal Graham	G	NYU	2	1967–1969	70	889	118	75	327	12.7	1.7	1.1	4.7	
Ronnie Grandison	F	New Orleans	1	1988–1989	72	528	92	42	177	7.3	1.3	0.6	2.5	
Wyndol Gray	G/F	Harvard	1	1946–1947	55			47	350			0.9	6.4	
Gerald Green	G/F	Gulf Shores Academy (TX)	3	2005–2007; 2016–2017	160	2,692	333	134	1,272	16.8	2.1	0.8	8.0	
Javonte Green	G/F	Radford	2	2019–2021	73	813	145	37	268	11.1	2.0	0.5	3.7	
Jeff Green	F	Georgetown	4	2010–2011; 2012–2015	222	6,762	925	338	3,252	30.5	4.2	1.5	14.6	
Rickey Green	G	Michigan	1	1991–1992	26	367	24	68	106	14.1	0.9	2.6	4.1	
Sihugo Green	G/F	Duquesne	1	1965–1966	10	92	11	9	32	9.2	1.1	0.9	3.2	
Orien Greene	G	Louisiana	1	2005–2006	80	1,235	145	129	254	15.4	1.8	1.6	3.2	
Adrian Griffin	G/F	Seton Hall	2	1999–2001	116	2,304	459	204	578	19.9	4.0	1.8	5.0	
Blake Griffin	F	Oklahoma	1	2022–2023	41	569	155	61	170	13.9	3.8	1.5	4.1	
Gene Guarilia	F	George Washington	4	1959–1963	129	1,082	294	36	413	8.4	2.3	0.3	3.2	
Tom Gugliotta	F	NC State	1	2004–2005	20	218	43	12	26	10.9	2.2	0.6	1.3	

=== H ===
All-time roster
Player	Pos.	Pre-draft team	Yrs	Seasons	Statistics									Ref.
Player	Pos.	Pre-draft team	Yrs	Seasons	GP	MP	REB	AST	PTS	MPG	RPG	APG	PPG	Ref.
Chick Halbert	C	West Texas A&M	1	1948–1949	33			61	310			1.8	9.4	
Steve Hamer	C	Tennessee	1	1996–1997	35	268	60	7	76	7.7	1.7	0.2	2.2	
Thomas Hamilton	C	Pittsburgh	1	1995–1996	11	70	22	1	25	6.4	2.0	0.1	2.3	
Cecil Hankins	G	Oklahoma State	1	1947–1948	25			8	70			0.3	2.8	
Phil Hankinson	F	Penn	2	1973–1975	31	187	57	6	122	6.0	1.8	0.2	3.9	
Reggie Hanson	F	Kentucky	1	1997–1998	8	26	6	1	6	3.3	0.8	0.1	0.8	
Luke Harangody	F	Notre Dame	1	2010–2011	28	241	55	10	63	8.6	2.0	0.4	2.3	
Ron Harper Jr.^{x}	F	Rutgers	1	2025–2026	29	318	48	22	123	11.0	1.7	0.8	4.2	
Bob Harris	F/C	Oklahoma State	4	1950–1954	251	5,768	1,780	365	1,692	27.9	7.1	1.5	6.7	
Tony Harris	G	New Orleans	2	1993–1995	8	106	10	8	58	13.3	1.3	1.0	7.3	
Sam Hauser^{x}	F	Virginia	5	2021–2026	334	6,664	1,033	341	2,613	20.0	3.1	1.0	7.8	
John Havlicek^ (#17)	G/F	Ohio State	16	1962–1978	1,270	46,471	8,007	6,114	26,395	36.6	6.3	4.8	20.8	
Michael Hawkins	G	Xavier	1	1996–1997	29	326	31	64	80	11.2	1.1	2.2	2.8	
Gordon Hayward	G/F	Butler	3	2017–2020	125	3,608	671	456	1,736	28.9	5.4	3.6	13.9	
John Hazen	G	Indiana State	1	1948–1949	6			3	18			0.5	3.0	
Tom Heinsohn^ (#15)	F/C	Holy Cross	9	1956–1965	654	19,254	5,749	1,318	12,194	29.4	8.8	2.0	18.6	
Dickie Hemric	F	Wake Forest	2	1955–1957	138	2,384	703	102	863	17.3	5.1	0.7	6.3	
Gerald Henderson	G	VCU	5	1979–1984	400	8,152	638	1,107	3,521	20.4	1.6	2.8	8.8	
Conner Henry	G	UC Santa Barbara	2	1986–1988	46	312	37	39	132	6.8	0.8	0.8	2.9	
Kleggie Hermsen	F/C	Minnesota	2	1950–1951; 1952–1953	27	22	7	20	150	5.5	1.8	0.7	5.6	
Juancho Hernangómez	F	(Spain) Estudiantes	1	2021–2022	18	96	25	3	19	5.3	1.4	0.2	1.1	
Chris Herren	G	Fresno State	1	2000–2001	25	408	21	56	83	16.3	0.8	2.2	3.3	
Sidney Hertzberg	G	CCNY	2	1949–1951	133		260	444	1,328		4.0	3.3	10.0	
Jack Hewson	F/C	Temple	1	1947–1948	24			1	65			0.0	2.7	
Mel Hirsch	G	Brooklyn	1	1946–1947	13			10	19			0.8	1.5	
Charlie Hoefer	G	Queens	2	1946–1948	42			27	221			0.6	5.3	
Jrue Holiday	G	UCLA	2	2023–2025	131	4,159	638	572	1,546	31.7	4.9	4.4	11.8	
John Holland (basketball)	SF	BU	1	2015–2016	1	1	0	0	0	1.0	0.0	0.0	0.0	
Ryan Hollins	C	UCLA	1	2011–2012	15	160	26	3	42	10.7	1.7	0.2	2.8	
Al Horford^{+}	C	Florida	7	2016–2019; 2021–2025	465	13,769	3,155	1,676	5,221	29.6	6.8	3.6	11.2	
Bob Houbregs^	F/C	Washington	1	1954–1955										
Eddie House	G	Arizona State	3	2007–2010	209	3,805	393	292	1,633	18.2	1.9	1.4	7.8	
Bailey Howell^	F	Mississippi State	4	1966–1970	323	9,909	2,717	493	5,812	30.7	8.4	1.5	18.0	
Lester Hudson	G	UT Martin	1	2009–2010	16	70	8	8	22	4.4	0.5	0.5	1.4	
Jay Humphries	G	Colorado	1	1994–1995	6	52	3	10	10	8.7	0.5	1.7	1.7	
Kris Humphries	F/C	Minnesota	1	2013–2014	69	1,376	409	67	579	19.9	5.9	1.0	8.4	
Brandon Hunter	F	Ohio	1	2003–2004	36	406	118	19	125	11.3	3.3	0.5	3.5	
R. J. Hunter	G	Georgia State	2	2015–2016; 2018–2019	37	341	40	16	114	9.2	1.1	0.4	3.1	

=== I to J ===
All-time roster
Player	Pos.	Pre-draft team	Yrs	Seasons	Statistics									Ref.
Player	Pos.	Pre-draft team	Yrs	Seasons	GP	MP	REB	AST	PTS	MPG	RPG	APG	PPG	Ref.
Kyrie Irving^{+}	G	Duke	2	2017–2019	127	4,145	562	770	3,062	32.6	4.4	6.1	24.1	
Demetrius Jackson	G	Notre Dame	1	2016–2017	5	17	4	3	10	3.4	0.8	0.6	2.0	
Justin Jackson	F	North Carolina	2	2021–2023	24	109	17	9	22	4.5	0.7	0.4	0.9	
Tracy Jackson	G/F	Notre Dame	1	1981–1982	11	66	12	5	26	6.0	1.1	0.5	2.4	
Mike James	G	Duquesne	1	2003–2004	55	1,684	176	244	588	30.6	3.2	4.4	10.7	
John Janisch	G/F	Valparaiso	1	1947–1948	3			0	3			0.0	1.0	
Al Jefferson	F/C	Prentiss HS (MS)	3	2004–2007	199	4,432	1,367	142	2,046	22.3	6.9	0.7	10.3	
Jonas Jerebko	F	(Italy) Pallacanestro Biella	3	2014–2017	185	2,935	700	163	846	15.9	3.8	0.9	4.6	
Amir Johnson	F/C	Westchester HS (CA)	2	2015–2017	159	3,408	871	278	1,097	21.4	5.5	1.7	6.9	
Chris Johnson	C	LSU	1	2010–2011	4	32	5	1	6	8.0	1.3	0.3	1.5	
Chris Johnson	G/F	Dayton	1	2013–2014	40	789	97	31	250	19.7	2.4	0.8	6.3	
Dennis Johnson^ (#3)	G	Pepperdine	7	1983–1990	541	18,321	1,757	3,486	6,805	33.9	3.2	6.4	12.6	
JaJuan Johnson	F	Purdue	1	2011–2012	36	298	58	6	114	8.3	1.6	0.2	3.2	
Joe Johnson	G/F	Arkansas	2	2001–2002; 2021–2022	49	1,005	139	74	306	20.5	2.8	1.5	6.2	
Rich Johnson	C	Grambling State	3	1968–1971	97	1,074	265	39	457	11.1	2.7	0.4	4.7	
Damon Jones	G	Houston	1	1998–1999	13	213	31	29	76	16.4	2.4	2.2	5.8	
Dontae' Jones	F	Mississippi State	1	1997–1998	15	91	9	5	44	6.1	0.6	0.3	2.9	
Dwayne Jones	F/C	Saint Joseph's	1	2005–2006	14	87	31	2	14	6.2	2.2	0.1	1.0	
Johnny Jones	F	Cal State Los Angeles	1	1967–1968	51	475	114	26	214	9.3	2.2	0.5	4.2	
Jumaine Jones	F	Georgia	1	2003–2004	42	373	68	14	93	8.9	1.6	0.3	2.2	
K. C. Jones^ (#25)	G	San Francisco	9	1958–1967	676	17,501	2,399	2,908	5,011	25.9	3.5	4.3	7.4	
Popeye Jones	F	Murray State	1	1998–1999	18	206	52	15	54	11.4	2.9	0.8	3.0	
Sam Jones^ (#24)	G/F	North Carolina Central	12	1957–1969	871	24,285	4,305	2,209	15,411	27.9	4.9	2.5	17.7	
Kris Joseph	F	Syracuse	1	2012–2013	6	24	5	1	7	4.0	0.8	0.2	1.2	
Jeff Judkins	G/F	Utah	2	1978–1980	146	2,195	257	192	1,060	15.0	1.8	1.3	7.3	

=== K to L ===
All-time roster
Player	Pos.	Pre-draft team	Yrs	Seasons	Statistics									Ref.
Player	Pos.	Pre-draft team	Yrs	Seasons	GP	MP	REB	AST	PTS	MPG	RPG	APG	PPG	Ref.
Mfiondu Kabengele	F/C	Florida State	1	2022–2023	4	36	10	0	6	9.0	2.5	0.0	1.5	
George Kaftan	F	Holy Cross	2	1948–1950	76			206	838			2.7	11.0	
Tony Kappen	G	Forest Hills HS (NY)	1	1946–1947	18			6	74			0.3	4.1	
Jerry Kelly	F	Marshall	1	1946–1947	43			21	256			0.5	6.0	
Tom Kelly	G	NYU	1	1948–1949	27			38	191			1.4	7.1	
Toby Kimball	F/C	UConn	1	1966–1967	38	222	146	13	97	5.8	3.8	0.3	2.6	
Maurice King	G	Kansas	1	1959–1960	1	19	4	2	10	19.0	4.0	2.0	10.0	
Stacey King	F/C	Oklahoma	1	1996–1997	5	33	9	1	12	6.6	1.8	0.2	2.4	
Bob Kinney	F/C	Rice	2	1948–1950	81			126	871			1.6	10.8	
Greg Kite	C	BYU	5	1983–1988	241	1,916	472	70	378	8.0	2.0	0.3	1.6	
Joe Kleine	C	Arkansas	5	1988–1993	329	4,833	1,378	170	1,447	14.7	4.2	0.5	4.4	
Billy Knight	G/F	Pittsburgh	1	1978–1979	40	1,119	173	66	556	28.0	4.3	1.7	13.9	
Travis Knight	C	UConn	1	1997–1998	74	1,503	365	104	482	20.3	4.9	1.4	6.5	
Bart Kofoed	G	Nebraska–Kearney	1	1992–1993	7	41	1	10	17	5.9	0.1	1.4	2.4	
Luke Kornet	F/C	Vanderbilt	5	2020–2025	235	3,487	923	265	1,142	14.8	3.9	1.1	4.9	
Harold Kottman	C	Culver-Stockton	1	1946–1947	53			17	165			0.3	3.1	
Wayne Kreklow	G	Drake	1	1980–1981	25	100	12	9	30	4.0	0.5	0.4	1.2	
Nenad Krstić	C	(Serbia) Partizan	1	2010–2011	24	553	128	8	218	23.0	5.3	0.3	9.1	
Steve Kuberski	F/C	Bradley	8	1969–1974; 1975–1978	499	7,295	1,998	300	2,929	14.6	4.0	0.6	5.9	
Frank Kudelka	G/F	Saint Mary's	1	1950–1951	27			30	128			1.1	4.7	
Oliver Lafayette	G	Houston	1	2009–2010	1	22	4	2	7	22.0	4.0	2.0	7.0	
Raef LaFrentz	F/C	Kansas	3	2003–2006	179	4,557	1,038	237	1,655	25.5	5.8	1.3	9.2	
Marcus Landry	F	Wisconsin	1	2009–2010	1	3	0	0	0	3.0	0.0	0.0	0.0	
Romeo Langford	G	Indiana	3	2019–2022	94	1,381	180	45	342	14.7	1.9	0.5	3.6	
Shane Larkin	G	Miami (FL)	1	2017–2018	54	775	92	98	231	14.4	1.7	1.8	4.3	
Tony Lavelli	F	Yale	1	1949–1950	56			40	492			0.7	8.8	
Courtney Lee	G	Western Kentucky	2	2012–2014	108	2,445	239	175	833	22.6	2.2	1.6	7.7	
David Lee	F	Florida	1	2015–2016	30	470	130	54	214	15.7	4.3	1.8	7.1	
Ed Leede	G/F	Dartmouth	2	1949–1951	121		118	225	949		2.1	1.9	7.8	
Reggie Lewis^{+} (#35)	G/F	Northeastern	6	1987–1993	450	14,676	1,938	1,153	7,902	32.6	4.3	2.6	17.6	
Todd Lichti	G/F	Stanford	1	1993–1994	4	48	8	6	19	12.0	2.0	1.5	4.8	
Alton Lister	F/C	Arizona State	2	1995–1997	110	1,163	419	28	220	10.6	3.8	0.3	2.0	
Brad Lohaus	F/C	Iowa	2	1987–1989	118	1,456	280	98	566	12.3	2.4	0.8	4.8	
Grant Long	F	Eastern Michigan	1	2002–2003	41	488	83	25	72	11.9	2.0	0.6	1.8	
Jim Loscutoff	F	Oregon	9	1955–1964	511	9,431	2,848	353	3,156	18.5	5.6	0.7	6.2	
Clyde Lovellette^	F/C	Kansas	2	1962–1964	106	1,005	303	51	696	9.5	2.9	0.5	6.6	
Al Lucas	G/F	Fordham	1	1948–1949	2			2	2			1.0	1.0	

=== M ===
All-time roster
Player	Pos.	Pre-draft team	Yrs	Seasons	Statistics									Ref.
Player	Pos.	Pre-draft team	Yrs	Seasons	GP	MP	REB	AST	PTS	MPG	RPG	APG	PPG	Ref.
Ed Macauley^ (#22)	F/C	Saint Louis	6	1950–1956	416	13,385	3,367	1,521	7,882	38.5	8.1	3.7	18.9	
John Mahnken	C	Georgetown	4	1949–1953	199	1,352	498	247	723	10.5	2.8	1.2	3.6	
Francis Mahoney	F	Brown	1	1952–1953	6	34	7	1	12	5.7	1.2	0.2	2.0	
Pete Maravich^	G	LSU	1	1979–1980	26	442	38	29	299	17.0	1.5	1.1	11.5	
Stephon Marbury	G	Georgia Tech	1	2008–2009	23	414	28	75	88	18.0	1.2	3.3	3.8	
Saul Mariaschin	G	Harvard	1	1947–1948	43			60	333			1.4	7.7	
Kelan Martin	F	Butler	1	2021–2022	3	6	2	0	0	2.0	0.7	0.0	0.0	
Tony Massenburg	F	Maryland	1	1991–1992	7	46	9	0	10	6.6	1.3	0.0	1.4	
Cedric Maxwell (#31)	F	Charlotte	8	1977–1985	607	18,495	4,023	1,390	8,311	30.5	6.6	2.3	13.7	
Bob McAdoo^	F/C	North Carolina	1	1978–1979	20	637	141	40	411	31.9	7.1	2.0	20.6	
Johnny McCarthy	G	Canisius	1	1963–1964	28	206	35	24	37	7.4	1.3	0.9	1.3	
Walter McCarty	F	Kentucky	8	1997–2005	494	9,476	1,402	623	2,806	19.2	2.8	1.3	5.7	
Xavier McDaniel	F	Wichita State	3	1992–1995	232	5,616	1,189	397	2,626	24.2	5.1	1.7	11.3	
Glenn McDonald	G/F	Long Beach State	2	1974–1976	137	1,414	203	92	590	10.3	1.5	0.7	4.3	
Kevin McHale^ (#32)	F/C	Minnesota	13	1980–1993	971	30,118	7,122	1,670	17,335	31.0	7.3	1.7	17.9	
Bones McKinney	F/C	North Carolina	2	1950–1952	97	1,083	354	190	572	17.2	3.6	2.0	5.9	
Dick Mehen	F/C	Tennessee	1	1950–1951	7		26	11	44		3.7	1.6	6.3	
Fab Melo	C	Syracuse	1	2012–2013	6	36	3	0	7	6.0	0.5	0.0	1.2	
Ron Mercer	G/F	Kentucky	2	1997–1999	121	4,213	435	280	1,919	34.8	3.6	2.3	15.9	
Jordan Mickey	F	LSU	2	2015–2017	41	198	47	8	59	4.8	1.1	0.2	1.4	
Chris Mihm	C	Texas	1	2003–2004	54	939	273	11	330	17.4	5.1	0.2	6.1	
Ed Mikan	F/C	DePaul	1	1953–1954	9	71	20	3	21	7.9	2.2	0.3	2.3	
C. J. Miles	G/F	Skyline HS (TX)	1	2021–2022	1	2	0	0	0	2.0	0.0	0.0	0.0	
Darko Miličić	F/C	(Serbia) Vršac	1	2012–2013	1	5	1	0	0	5.0	1.0	0.0	0.0	
Dirk Minniefield	G	Kentucky	1	1987–1988	61	868	75	190	196	14.2	1.2	3.1	3.2	
Greg Minor	G/F	Louisville	5	1994–1999	277	5,144	741	384	1,902	18.6	2.7	1.4	6.9	
Mark Minor	F	Ohio State	1	1972–1973	4	20	4	2	5	5.0	1.0	0.5	1.3	
Josh Minott	F	Memphis	1	2025–2026	33	526	118	33	192	15.9	3.6	1.0	5.8	
Jérôme Moïso	F/C	UCLA	1	2000–2001	24	135	42	3	35	5.6	1.8	0.1	1.5	
Greg Monroe	F/C	Georgetown	2	2017–2019	28	501	168	60	271	17.9	6.0	2.1	9.7	
Eric Montross	C	North Carolina	2	1994–1996	139	3,747	918	79	1,223	27.0	6.6	0.6	8.8	
E'Twaun Moore	G/F	Purdue	1	2011–2012	38	331	33	34	110	8.7	0.9	0.9	2.9	
Mikki Moore	F/C	Nebraska	2	2002–2003; 2008–2009	27	468	107	25	116	17.3	4.0	0.9	4.3	
Juwan Morgan	F	Indiana	1	2021–2022	1	4	0	0	0	4.0	0.0	0.0	0.0	
Rex Morgan	G	Jacksonville	2	1970–1972	62	416	91	39	172	6.7	1.5	0.6	2.8	
Marcus Morris Sr.	F	Kansas	2	2017–2019	129	3,538	747	181	1,780	27.4	5.8	1.4	13.8	
Red Morrison	F/C	Idaho	2	1954–1956	142	2,137	796	135	534	15.0	5.6	1.0	3.8	
Joe Mullaney	G	Holy Cross	1	1949–1950	37			52	30			1.4	0.8	
Todd Mundt	C	Delta State	1	1995–1996	9	33	3	1	6	3.7	0.3	0.1	0.7	
George Munroe	G	Dartmouth	1	1947–1948	21			3	71			0.1	3.4	
Dick Murphy	G	Manhattan	1	1946–1947	7			3	2			0.4	0.3	
Troy Murphy	F/C	Notre Dame	1	2010–2011	17	178	38	6	44	10.5	2.2	0.4	2.6	
Mike Muscala	F/C	Bucknell	1	2022–2023	20	323	68	12	118	16.2	3.4	0.6	5.9	
Sviatoslav Mykhailiuk	F	Kansas	1	2023–2024	41	413	51	35	162	10.1	1.2	0.9	4.0	

=== N to P ===
All-time roster
Player	Pos.	Pre-draft team	Yrs	Seasons	Statistics									Ref.
Player	Pos.	Pre-draft team	Yrs	Seasons	GP	MP	REB	AST	PTS	MPG	RPG	APG	PPG	Ref.
Abdel Nader	F	Iowa State	1	2017–2018	48	522	71	26	146	10.9	1.5	0.5	3.0	
Willie Naulls	F/C	UCLA	3	1963–1966	220	4,307	1,011	208	2,274	19.6	4.6	0.9	10.3	
Don Nelson^ (#19)	F	Iowa	11	1965–1976	872	18,970	4,517	1,354	9,968	21.8	5.2	1.6	11.4	
Jameer Nelson	G	Saint Joseph's	1	2014–2015	6	121	17	33	29	20.2	2.8	5.5	4.8	
Aaron Nesmith	G/F	Vanderbilt	2	2020–2022	98	1,243	216	45	414	12.7	2.2	0.5	4.2	
Jack Nichols	F/C	Washington	5	1953–1958	314	7,721	1,834	533	2,747	24.6	7.2	1.7	8.7	
Rich Niemann	C	Saint Louis	1	1969–1970	6	18	6	2	6	3.0	1.0	0.3	1.0	
Bevo Nordmann	C	Saint Louis	1	1964–1965	3	25	8	3	6	8.3	2.7	1.0	2.0	
Miles Norris	F	UC Santa Barbara	1	2024–2025	3	35	9	0	7	11.7	3.0	0.0	2.3	
George Nostrand	F/C	Wyoming	2	1948–1950	45			55	373			1.2	8.3	
Stan Noszka	G	Duquesne	2	1947–1949	52			29	153			0.6	2.9	
Patrick O'Bryant	C	Bradley	1	2008–2009	26	108	34	8	40	4.2	1.3	0.3	1.5	
Dermie O'Connell	G	Holy Cross	2	1948–1950	58			129	381			2.2	6.6	
Semi Ojeleye	F	SMU	4	2017–2021	254	3,705	539	117	877	14.6	2.1	0.5	3.5	
Jimmy Oliver	G/F	Purdue	1	1993–1994	44	540	46	33	216	12.3	1.0	0.8	4.9	
Michael Olowokandi	C	Pacific	2	2005–2007	40	401	89	11	85	10.0	2.2	0.3	2.1	
Bud Olsen	F/C	Louisville	1	1968–1969	7	43	14	4	14	6.1	2.0	0.6	2.0	
Kelly Olynyk	F/C	Gonzaga	4	2013–2017	278	5,756	1,310	471	2,628	20.7	4.7	1.7	9.5	
Jermaine O'Neal	F/C	Eau Claire HS (SC)	2	2010–2012	49	1,001	223	22	254	20.4	4.6	0.4	5.2	
Shaquille O'Neal^	C	LSU	1	2010–2011	37	752	178	26	341	20.3	4.8	0.7	9.2	
Doug Overton	G	La Salle	2	1999–2001	55	576	48	72	190	10.5	0.9	1.3	3.5	
Milt Palacio	G	Colorado State	2	2000–2002	99	1,659	152	205	494	16.8	1.5	2.1	5.0	
Togo Palazzi	G/F	Holy Cross	3	1954–1957	137	1,440	403	80	727	10.5	2.9	0.6	5.3	
Robert Parish^ (#00)	C	Centenary	14	1980–1994	1,106	34,977	11,051	1,679	18,245	31.6	10.0	1.5	16.5	
Jabari Parker	F	Duke	2	2020–2022	22	250	64	16	117	11.4	2.9	0.7	5.3	
Aleksandar Pavlović	G/F	(Montenegro) Budućnost	2	2010–2012	62	676	86	21	151	10.9	1.4	0.3	2.4	
Jim Paxson	G/F	Dayton	3	1987–1990	157	2,959	178	293	1,196	18.8	1.1	1.9	7.6	
Gary Payton^	G	Oregon State	1	2004–2005	77	2,541	236	469	873	33.0	3.1	6.1	11.3	
Kendrick Perkins	C	Beaumont HS (TX)	8	2003–2011	454	10,123	2,751	457	2,917	22.3	6.1	1.0	6.4	
Drew Peterson	F	USC	2	2023–2025	28	209	41	14	65	7.5	1.5	0.5	2.3	
Andy Phillip^	G/F	Illinois	2	1956–1958	137	2,640	339	289	534	19.3	2.5	2.1	3.9	
Gary Phillips	G	Houston	1	1961–1962	67	713	107	64	270	10.6	1.6	1.0	4.0	
Paul Pierce^ (#34)	G/F	Kansas	15	1998–2013	1,102	40,360	6,651	4,305	24,021	36.6	6.0	3.9	21.8	
Mickaël Piétrus	G/F	(France) Élan Béarnais	1	2011–2012	42	921	130	25	289	21.9	3.1	0.6	6.9	
Ed Pinckney	F	Villanova	6	1988–1994	340	6,517	1,799	282	2,060	19.2	5.3	0.8	6.1	
Kevinn Pinkney	F	Nevada	1	2006–2007	6	100	15	5	31	16.7	2.5	0.8	5.2	
Vincent Poirier	F	(Spain) Baskonia	1	2019–2020	22	130	43	8	41	5.9	2.0	0.4	1.9	
Scot Pollard	C	Kansas	1	2007–2008	22	173	37	3	39	7.9	1.7	0.1	1.8	
Dave Popson	F/C	North Carolina	1	1990–1991	19	64	14	2	35	3.4	0.7	0.1	1.8	
Kristaps Porziņģis	C	(Spain) Sevilla	2	2023–2025	99	2,900	693	202	1,963	29.3	7.0	2.0	19.8	
James Posey	G/F	Xavier	1	2007–2008	74	1,821	322	114	545	24.6	4.4	1.5	7.4	
Vitaly Potapenko	C	Wright State	4	1998–2002	273	5,968	1,579	230	2,053	21.9	5.8	0.8	7.5	
Leon Powe	F	California	3	2006–2009	189	2,756	787	71	1,247	14.6	4.2	0.4	6.6	
Dwight Powell	F/C	Stanford	1	2014–2015	5	9	1	0	9	1.8	0.2	0.0	1.8	
Phil Pressey	G	Missouri	2	2013–2015	125	1,732	185	358	390	13.9	1.5	2.9	3.1	
Tayshaun Prince	F	Kentucky	1	2014–2015	9	198	30	18	76	22.0	3.3	2.0	8.4	
Kevin Pritchard	G	Kansas	1	1991–1992	11	136	11	30	46	12.4	1.0	2.7	4.2	
Payton Pritchard^{x}	G	Oregon	6	2020–2026	426	9,564	1,264	1,291	4,498	22.5	3.0	3.0	10.6	
Gabe Pruitt	G	USC	2	2007–2009	62	461	51	52	125	7.4	0.8	0.8	2.0	

=== Q to R ===
All-time roster
Player	Pos.	Pre-draft team	Yrs	Seasons	Statistics									Ref.
Player	Pos.	Pre-draft team	Yrs	Seasons	GP	MP	REB	AST	PTS	MPG	RPG	APG	PPG	Ref.
Neemias Queta^{x}	C	Utah State	3	2023–2026	166	3,122	994	191	1,240	18.8	6.0	1.2	7.5	
Dino Rađa^	F/C	(Croatia) Split	4	1993–1997	224	7,308	1,883	356	3,733	32.6	8.4	1.6	16.7	
Frank Ramsey^ (#23)	G/F	Kentucky	9	1954–1955; 1956–1964	623	15,330	3,410	1,134	8,378	24.6	5.5	1.8	13.4	
Shavlik Randolph	F	Duke	2	2012–2013; 2014–2015	21	223	82	5	74	10.6	3.9	0.2	3.5	
Theo Ratliff	F/C	Wyoming	1	2006–2007	2	44	7	0	5	22.0	3.5	0.0	2.5	
Allan Ray	G	Villanova	1	2006–2007	47	710	69	43	290	15.1	1.5	0.9	6.2	
Justin Reed	F	Ole Miss	2	2004–2006	55	412	45	17	116	7.5	0.8	0.3	2.1	
Josh Richardson	G/F	Tennessee	1	2021–2022	44	1,087	125	66	427	24.7	2.8	1.5	9.7	
John Richter	F	NC State	1	1959–1960	66	808	312	27	285	12.2	4.7	0.4	4.3	
Mel Riebe	G/F	Wooster	2	1947–1949	81			136	851			1.7	10.5	
Eric Riley	C	Michigan	1	1998–1999	35	337	99	13	78	9.6	2.8	0.4	2.2	
Arnie Risen^	F/C	Ohio State	3	1955–1958	174	3,651	1,199	191	1,274	21.0	6.9	1.1	7.3	
Ramón Rivas	F/C	Temple	1	1988–1989	28	91	24	3	40	3.3	0.9	0.1	1.4	
Bill Roberts	C	Wyoming	1	1948–1949	26			13	81			0.5	3.1	
Fred Roberts	F/C	BYU	2	1986–1988	147	2,111	352	143	852	14.4	2.4	1.0	5.8	
Rick Robey	F/C	Kentucky	5	1978–1983	339	6,442	1,693	430	2,829	19.0	5.0	1.3	8.3	
Larry Robinson	G/F	Centenary	1	1991–1992	1	6	2	1	2	6.0	2.0	1.0	2.0	
Nate Robinson	G	Washington	2	2009–2011	81	1,365	127	156	558	16.9	1.6	1.9	6.9	
Rodney Rogers	F	Wake Forest	1	2001–2002	27	626	107	40	288	23.2	4.0	1.5	10.7	
Roy Rogers	F	Alabama	1	1997–1998	9	37	5	1	7	4.1	0.6	0.1	0.8	
Kenny Rollins	G	Kentucky	1	1952–1953	43	426	45	46	98	9.9	1.0	1.1	2.3	
Rajon Rondo^{+}	G	Kentucky	9	2006–2015	527	17,346	2,485	4,474	5,783	32.9	4.7	8.5	11.0	
Curtis Rowe	F	UCLA	3	1976–1979	183	4,323	1,008	221	1,466	23.6	5.5	1.2	8.0	
Terry Rozier	G	Louisville	4	2015–2019	272	5,433	973	631	2,090	20.0	3.6	2.3	7.7	
Bill Russell^ (#6)	C	San Francisco	13	1956–1969	963	40,726	21,620	4,100	14,522	42.3	22.5	4.3	15.1	
Matt Ryan	F	Chattanooga	1	2021–2022	1	5	0	0	3	5.0	0.0	0.0	3.0	

=== S ===
All-time roster
Player	Pos.	Pre-draft team	Yrs	Seasons	Statistics									Ref.
Player	Pos.	Pre-draft team	Yrs	Seasons	GP	MP	REB	AST	PTS	MPG	RPG	APG	PPG	Ref.
Ed Sadowski	C	Seton Hall	1	1947–1948	47			74	910			1.6	19.4	
Ken Sailors	G	Wyoming	1	1950–1951	10		3	8	18		0.3	0.8	1.8	
Frankie Sanders	G/F	Southern	1	1978–1979	24	216	51	17	132	9.0	2.1	0.7	5.5	
Satch Sanders^ (#16)	F	NYU	13	1960–1973	916	22,164	5,798	1,026	8,766	24.2	6.3	1.1	9.6	
Woody Sauldsberry	F/C	Texas Southern	1	1965–1966	39	530	142	15	171	13.6	3.6	0.4	4.4	
Fred Saunders	F	Syracuse	2	1976–1978	94	1,294	260	96	477	13.8	2.8	1.0	5.1	
Brian Scalabrine	F	USC	5	2005–2010	264	3,453	396	195	723	13.1	1.5	0.7	2.7	
Baylor Scheierman^{x}	G	Creighton	2	2024–2026	108	1,813	334	149	540	16.8	3.1	1.4	5.0	
Dwayne Schintzius	C	Florida	1	1998–1999	16	67	19	8	11	4.2	1.2	0.5	0.7	
Dennis Schröder	G	(Germany) Phantoms Braunschweig	1	2021–2022	49	1,433	164	208	704	29.2	3.3	4.2	14.4	
Fred Scolari	G	San Francisco	1	1954–1955	59	619	77	93	191	10.5	1.3	1.6	3.2	
Charlie Scott^	G/F	North Carolina	3	1975–1978	156	5,574	650	680	2,728	35.7	4.2	4.4	17.5	
Ed Searcy	F	St. John's	1	1975–1976	4	12	0	1	6	3.0	0.0	0.3	1.5	
Jim Seminoff	G/F	USC	2	1948–1950	123			478	769			3.9	6.3	
Earl Shannon	G/F	Rhode Island	1	1948–1949	5			4	5			0.8	1.0	
Howie Shannon	G/F	Kansas State	1	1949–1950	67			174	587			2.6	8.8	
Bill Sharman^ (#21)	G	USC	10	1951–1961	680	21,793	2,683	2,062	12,287	32.0	3.9	3.0	18.1	
Brian Shaw	G	UC Santa Barbara	3	1988–1989; 1990–1992	178	5,509	815	1,163	1,969	30.9	4.6	6.5	11.1	
Max Shulga^{x}	G	VCU	1	2025–2026	11	36	6	2	7	3.3	0.5	0.2	0.6	
Jerry Sichting	G	Purdue	3	1985–1988	184	3,532	216	435	1,083	19.2	1.2	2.4	5.9	
Larry Siegfried	F	Ohio State	7	1963–1970	466	11,401	1,318	1,532	5,420	24.5	2.8	3.3	11.6	
Paul Silas^{+}	F/C	Creighton	4	1972–1976	325	10,540	4,004	864	3,744	32.4	12.3	2.7	11.5	
Xavier Silas	G	Northern Illinois	1	2017–2018	2	7	2	0	0	3.5	1.0	0.0	0.0	
Connie Simmons	F/C	Flushing HS (NY)	2	1946–1948	92			79	868			0.9	9.4	
John Simmons	G	NYU	1	1946–1947	60			29	318			0.5	5.3	
Anfernee Simons	G	IMG Academy (FL)	1	2025–2026	49	1,202	118	116	694	24.5	2.4	2.4	14.2	
Marcus Smart	G	Oklahoma State	9	2014–2023	581	17,441	2,058	2,700	6,141	30.0	3.5	4.6	10.6	
Charles Smith	G	Georgetown	2	1989–1991	65	549	71	109	180	8.4	1.1	1.7	2.8	
Derek Smith	G/F	Louisville	1	1990–1991	2	16	0	5	5	8.0	0.0	2.5	2.5	
Doug Smith	F	Missouri	1	1995–1996	17	92	22	4	33	5.4	1.3	0.2	1.9	
Garfield Smith	F/C	Eastern Kentucky	2	1970–1972	63	415	132	17	168	6.6	2.1	0.3	2.7	
Michael Smith	F	BYU	2	1989–1991	112	1,009	156	122	545	9.0	1.4	1.1	4.9	
Art Spector	F	Villanova	4	1946–1950	169			143	852			0.8	5.0	
Jaden Springer	G	Tennessee	2	2023–2025	43	271	44	19	80	6.3	1.0	0.4	1.9	
Kevin Stacom	G	Providence	5	1974–1979	296	3,878	443	440	1,568	13.1	1.5	1.5	5.3	
Ed Stanczak	F		1	1950–1951	19		36	7	60		1.9	0.4	3.2	
Nik Stauskas	G	Michigan	1	2021–2022	6	15	0	1	7	2.5	0.0	0.2	1.2	
Lamar Stevens	F	Penn State	1	2023–2024	19	122	31	8	53	6.4	1.6	0.4	2.8	
Michael Stewart	C	California	1	2003–2004	17	71	11	0	5	4.2	0.6	0.0	0.3	
Greg Stiemsma	C	Wisconsin	1	2011–2012	55	766	177	28	161	13.9	3.2	0.5	2.9	
Bryant Stith	G	Virginia	1	2000–2001	78	2,504	284	168	756	32.1	3.6	2.2	9.7	
Erick Strickland	G	Nebraska	1	2001–2002	79	1,643	213	184	606	20.8	2.7	2.3	7.7	
Derek Strong	F	Xavier	1	1994–1995	70	1,344	375	44	441	19.2	5.4	0.6	6.3	
Gene Stump	G/F	DePaul	2	1947–1949	99			74	620			0.7	6.3	
Jared Sullinger	F	Ohio State	4	2012–2016	258	6,414	1,979	474	2,856	24.9	7.7	1.8	11.1	
Bruno Šundov	C	(Croatia) Split	1	2002–2003	26	138	28	7	32	5.3	1.1	0.3	1.2	
Bennie Swain	F	Texas Southern	1	1958–1959	58	708	262	29	265	12.2	4.5	0.5	4.6	
Dan Swartz	F	Morehead State	1	1962–1963	39	335	88	21	175	8.6	2.3	0.5	4.5	
Larry Sykes	F	Xavier	1	1995–1996	1	2	2	0	0	2.0	2.0	0.0	0.0	
Brett Szabo	C	Augustana University	1	1996–1997	70	662	165	17	153	9.5	2.4	0.2	2.2	
Wally Szczerbiak	F	Miami (OH)	2	2005–2007	64	2,074	221	156	1,040	32.4	3.5	2.4	16.3	

=== T to V ===
All-time roster
Player	Pos.	Pre-draft team	Yrs	Seasons	Statistics									Ref.
Player	Pos.	Pre-draft team	Yrs	Seasons	GP	MP	REB	AST	PTS	MPG	RPG	APG	PPG	Ref.
Žan Tabak	C	(Croatia) Split	1	1997–1998	18	232	58	12	59	12.9	3.2	0.7	3.3	
Earl Tatum	G/F	Marquette	1	1978–1979	3	38	4	1	20	12.7	1.3	0.3	6.7	
Jayson Tatum*	F	Duke	9	2017–2026	601	20,707	4,453	2,328	14,132	34.5	7.4	3.9	23.5	
Jeff Teague	G	Wake Forest	1	2020–2021	34	616	57	73	233	18.1	1.7	2.1	6.9	
Sebastian Telfair	G	Abraham Lincoln HS (NY)	1	2006–2007	78	1,578	108	218	479	20.2	1.4	2.8	6.1	
Jason Terry	G	Arizona	1	2012–2013	79	2,124	159	198	799	26.9	2.0	2.5	10.1	
Tom Thacker	G/F	Cincinnati	1	1967–1968	65	782	161	69	271	12.0	2.5	1.1	4.2	
Daniel Theis	C	(Germany) Ratiopharm Ulm	5	2017–2022	257	4,830	1,243	323	1,869	18.8	4.8	1.3	7.3	
David Thirdkill	G/F	Bradley	2	1985–1987	66	474	89	17	188	7.2	1.3	0.3	2.8	
Brodric Thomas	G	Truman State	1	2021–2022	12	60	10	11	21	5.0	0.8	0.9	1.8	
Isaiah Thomas^{+}	G	Washington	3	2014–2017	179	5,758	492	1,070	4,422	32.2	2.7	6.0	24.7	
Jamel Thomas	F	Providence	1	1999–2000	3	19	2	2	11	6.3	0.7	0.7	3.7	
John Thomas	F	Minnesota	1	1997–1998	33	368	70	13	108	11.2	2.1	0.4	3.3	
John Thompson^	F	Providence	2	1964–1966	74	771	260	19	262	10.4	3.5	0.3	3.5	
Tristan Thompson	F/C	Texas	1	2020–2021	54	1,287	439	67	409	23.8	8.1	1.2	7.6	
Marcus Thornton	G	LSU	1	2014–2015	39	640	73	34	348	16.4	1.9	0.9	8.9	
Darren Tillis	F/C	Cleveland State	1	1982–1983	15	44	9	2	16	2.9	0.6	0.1	1.1	
Xavier Tillman Sr.	F/C	Michigan State	3	2023–2026	67	616	122	32	145	9.2	1.8	0.5	2.2	
John Tonje^{x}	G	Wisconsin	1	2025–2026	6	42	6	2	15	7.0	1.0	0.3	2.5	
Lou Tsioropoulos	F	Kentucky	3	1956–1959	157	2,977	751	165	910	19.0	4.8	1.1	5.8	
Andre Turner	G	Memphis	1	1986–1987	3	18	2	1	4	6.0	0.7	0.3	1.3	
Evan Turner	G	Ohio State	2	2014–2016	163	4,531	814	808	1,633	27.8	5.0	5.0	10.0	
Wayne Turner	G	Kentucky	1	1999–2000	3	41	3	5	4	13.7	1.0	1.7	1.3	
Kelvin Upshaw	G	Utah	2	1988–1990	37	604	49	125	192	16.3	1.3	3.4	5.2	
Jarvis Varnado	F	Mississippi State	1	2012–2013	5	18	3	1	6	3.6	0.6	0.2	1.2	
Virgil Vaughn	F/C	Western Kentucky	1	1946–1947	17			10	45			0.6	2.6	
Sam Vincent	G	Michigan State	2	1985–1987	103	806	75	128	355	7.8	0.7	1.2	3.4	
Noah Vonleh	F/C	Indiana	1	2022–2023	23	171	48	7	25	7.4	2.1	0.3	1.1	
Stojko Vranković	C	(Croatia) Zadar	2	1990–1992	50	276	79	9	95	5.5	1.6	0.2	1.9	
Nikola Vučević^{x}	C	USC	1	2025–2026	16	338	106	32	155	21.1	6.6	2.0	9.7	

=== W to Z ===
All-time roster
Player	Pos.	Pre-draft team	Yrs	Seasons	Statistics									Ref.
Player	Pos.	Pre-draft team	Yrs	Seasons	GP	MP	REB	AST	PTS	MPG	RPG	APG	PPG	Ref.
Von Wafer	G	Florida State	1	2010–2011	58	553	49	35	184	9.5	0.8	0.6	3.2	
Moritz Wagner	F/C	Michigan	1	2020–2021	9	61	19	6	11	6.8	2.1	0.7	1.2	
Antoine Walker^{+}	F	Kentucky	8	1996–2003; 2004–2005	552	21,654	4,782	2,266	11,386	39.2	8.7	4.1	20.6	
Brady Walker	F/C	BYU	2	1949–1951	85		31	117	539		1.8	1.4	6.3	
Henry Walker	F	Kansas State	2	2008–2010	37	245	34	16	96	6.6	0.9	0.4	2.6	
Kemba Walker^{+}	G	UConn	2	2019–2021	99	3,111	387	480	1,974	31.4	3.9	4.8	19.9	
Gerald Wallace	F	Alabama	2	2013–2015	90	1,702	269	154	333	18.9	3.0	1.7	3.7	
Rasheed Wallace	F/C	North Carolina	1	2009–2010	79	1,780	325	80	710	22.5	4.1	1.0	9.0	
Red Wallace	G	Scranton	1	1946–1947	24			20	131			0.8	5.5	
Jordan Walsh^{x}	F	Arkansas	3	2023–2026	129	1,698	361	78	461	13.2	2.8	0.6	3.6	
Bill Walton^	F/C	UCLA	2	1985–1987	90	1,658	575	174	634	18.4	6.4	1.9	7.0	
Brad Wanamaker	G	Pittsburgh	2	2018–2020	107	1,712	185	235	627	16.0	1.7	2.2	5.9	
Gerry Ward	G	Boston College	1	1964–1965	3	30	5	6	5	10.0	1.7	2.0	1.7	
Kermit Washington	F/C	American	1	1977–1978	32	866	335	42	376	27.1	10.5	1.3	11.8	
Tremont Waters	G	LSU	2	2019–2021	37	357	33	78	139	9.6	0.9	2.1	3.8	
Ron Watts	F	Wake Forest	2	1965–1967	28	92	39	2	40	3.3	1.4	0.1	1.4	
Marcus Webb	F/C	Alabama	1	1992–1993	9	51	10	2	39	5.7	1.1	0.2	4.3	
Scott Wedman	G/F	Colorado	5	1982–1987	271	4,026	573	281	1,689	14.9	2.1	1.0	6.2	
Rick Weitzman	G	Northeastern	1	1967–1968	25	75	10	8	33	3.0	0.4	0.3	1.3	
Jiří Welsch	G	(Slovenia) Olimpija	2	2003–2005	136	3,304	435	267	1,161	24.3	3.2	2.0	8.5	
Matt Wenstrom	C	North Carolina	1	1993–1994	11	37	12	0	18	3.4	1.1	0.0	1.6	
David Wesley	G	Baylor	3	1994–1997	207	6,475	645	1,193	2,627	31.3	3.1	5.8	12.7	
Delonte West	G	Saint Joseph's	4	2004–2007; 2010–2011	203	5,597	599	750	1,991	27.6	3.0	3.7	9.8	
Paul Westphal^	G	USC	3	1972–1975	224	3,228	373	475	1,636	14.4	1.7	2.1	7.3	
Skippy Whitaker	G	Kentucky	1	1954–1955	3	15	1	1	2	5.0	0.3	0.3	0.7	
D. J. White	F	Indiana	1	2012–2013	12	86	13	4	29	7.2	1.1	0.3	2.4	
Derrick White^{x}	G	Colorado	5	2021–2026	334	10,612	1,371	1,565	4,925	31.8	4.1	4.7	14.7	
Jo Jo White^ (#10)	G	Kansas	10	1969–1979	717	26,770	3,071	3,686	13,188	37.3	4.3	5.1	18.4	
Sidney Wicks	F/C	UCLA	2	1976–1978	163	5,055	1,497	340	2,321	31.0	9.2	2.1	14.2	
Chris Wilcox	F	Maryland	2	2011–2013	89	1,311	302	34	411	14.7	3.4	0.4	4.6	
Dominique Wilkins^	G/F	Georgia	1	1994–1995	77	2,423	401	166	1,370	31.5	5.2	2.2	17.8	
Amari Williams^{x}	F	Kentucky	1	2025–2026	22	146	40	10	30	6.6	1.8	0.5	1.4	
Art Williams	G	Cal Poly Pomona	4	1970–1974	303	4,058	758	959	1,208	13.4	2.5	3.2	4.0	
Earl Williams	F/C	Winston-Salem State	1	1978–1979	20	273	105	12	122	13.7	5.3	0.6	6.1	
Eric Williams	F	Providence	7	1995–1997; 1999–2004	462	11,638	1,607	678	4,248	25.2	3.5	1.5	9.2	
Grant Williams	F	Tennessee	4	2019–2023	288	6,101	993	341	1,774	21.2	3.4	1.2	6.2	
Lorenzo Williams	F/C	Stetson	1	1992–1993	22	151	44	5	34	6.9	2.0	0.2	1.5	
Ray Williams	G	Minnesota	1	1984–1985	23	459	57	90	147	20.0	2.5	3.9	6.4	
Robert Williams III	F	Texas A&M	5	2018–2023	209	4,284	1,447	299	1,534	20.5	6.9	1.4	7.3	
Sean Williams	F/C	Boston College	1	2011–2012	3	42	12	3	11	14.0	4.0	1.0	3.7	
Shammond Williams	G	North Carolina	1	2002–2003	51	1,169	110	128	372	22.9	2.2	2.5	7.3	
Shelden Williams	F	Duke	1	2009–2010	54	597	146	21	201	11.1	2.7	0.4	3.7	
Sly Williams	G/F	Rhode Island	1	1985–1986	6	54	15	2	17	9.0	2.5	0.3	2.8	
Terrence Williams	F	Louisville	1	2012–2013	24	318	44	38	110	13.3	1.8	1.6	4.6	
Willie Williams	F	Florida State	1	1970–1971	16	56	10	2	15	3.5	0.6	0.1	0.9	
Bobby Wilson	F	Kansas	1	1976–1977	25	131	9	14	49	5.2	0.4	0.6	2.0	
Joe Wolf	F/C	North Carolina	1	1992–1993	2	9	3	0	1	4.5	1.5	0.0	0.5	
Rubén Wolkowyski	F	(Argentina) Estudiantes de Olavarría	1	2002–2003	7	24	1	1	5	3.4	0.1	0.1	0.7	
Brandan Wright	F/C	North Carolina	1	2014–2015	8	86	17	8	26	10.8	2.1	1.0	3.3	
A. J. Wynder	G	Fairfield	1	1990–1991	6	39	3	8	12	6.5	0.5	1.3	2.0	
Guerschon Yabusele	F	(France) Rouen Métropole	2	2017–2019	74	486	105	31	173	6.6	1.4	0.4	2.3	
James Young	G/F	Kentucky	3	2014–2017	89	751	94	26	202	8.4	1.1	0.3	2.3	
Tyler Zeller	F/C	North Carolina	3	2014–2017	193	2,966	767	184	1,375	15.4	4.0	1.0	7.1	

== See also ==
- Boston Celtics roster
- Boston Celtics current roster
