= 1947–48 Boston Celtics season =

NBA basketball team season

- Head coach: Honey Russell
- Owners: Walter A. Brown
- Arena: Boston Arena; Boston Garden

Results
- Record: 20–28 (.417)
- Place: Division: 3rd (Eastern)
- Playoff finish: BAA Quarterfinals (lost to Stags 1–2)
- Stats at Basketball Reference
- Radio: WMEX

The 1947–48 Boston Celtics season was the second season of the Boston Celtics in the Basketball Association of America (BAA/NBA). After four of the inaugural BAA teams folded operations and the (original) Baltimore Bullets from the original American Basketball League went from the ABL to the BAA, the Boston Celtics played in a reformatted Eastern Division. This divisional reformatting saw them achieve their first ever playoff appearance in the 1948 BAA playoffs despite them having a losing record once again with a 20–28 record (though a major part of what would get them in the playoffs this season was the Providence Steamrollers having a 6–42 record, which remains the lowest number of wins recorded in a BAA/NBA season). Due to the early formatting issues the BAA had at the time, their sole appearance in the BAA Quarterfinals saw them going up against the Chicago Stags despite them being a Western Division team this season; Boston lost to the Stags 2–1, with them not being able to return to the playoffs again until the 1951 NBA playoffs at the start of head coach Red Auerbach's tenure with the team.

== Draft picks ==
Round	Pick	Player	Position	Nationality	School / Club
1	3	Bulbs Ehlers	G/F	United States	Purdue
2	13	Hank Biasatti	G	Italy; Canada	Assumption College / Toronto Huskies (BAA)
3	23	Gene Stump	G/F	United States	DePaul
4	33	Johnny Ezersky	G/F	United States	Rhode Island State / Brooklyn Gothams (ABL)
5	43	Jack Hewson	F/C	United States	Temple / Philadelphia Sphas (ABL)
6	51	Bob Alemeida	–	United States	California
7	59	George Felt	–	United States	Northwestern
8	65	John Kelly	–	United States	Notre Dame
9	71	George Petrovick	G	United States	Warren Harding High School (Bridgeport, CT) / Bridgeport Newfield Steelers (NEBL)

Johnny Ezersky would end up being traded to the nearby Providence Steamrollers not long after the draft concluded. Interestingly, the second round selection of Hank Biasetti would be one of two BAA draft selections (alongside Irv Rothenberg later being selected by the Washington Capitols) to be taken by a BAA/NBA team when they had already previously played for the BAA in the previous season (with Biasetti playing for the Toronto Huskies (who were still active at the time of the draft) and Rothenberg playing for the soon-to-be-defunct Cleveland Rebels), which would be a unique situation there in its own right.

== Roster ==
1947–48 Boston Celtics roster
Players

Pos.	No.	Player	Height	Weight	DOB	From
F/C	10	Mike Bloom	6 ft 6 in (1.98 m)	190 lb (86 kg)	1915-01-14	Temple
F/C	11	Chuck Connors	6 ft 5 in (1.96 m)	190 lb (86 kg)	1921-04-10	Seton Hall
G/F	14	Bulbs Ehlers	6 ft 3 in (1.91 m)	198 lb (90 kg)	1923-03-10	Purdue
G	15–21	Jack Garfinkel	6 ft 3 in (1.91 m)	185 lb (84 kg)	1918-06-13	St. John's
G	5	Cecil Hankins	6 ft 1 in (1.85 m)	175 lb (79 kg)	1922-01-06	Oklahoma State
F/C	17	Jack Hewson	6 ft 6 in (1.98 m)	195 lb (88 kg)	1924-09-17	Temple
G	3	Charlie Hoefer	5 ft 9 in (1.75 m)	158 lb (72 kg)	1917-07-12	Queens College
G/F	17	John Janisch	6 ft 3 in (1.91 m)	200 lb (91 kg)	1920-03-15	Valparaiso
G	4	Saul Mariaschin	5 ft 11 in (1.80 m)	165 lb (75 kg)	1924-09-01	Harvard
G	6	George Munroe	5 ft 11 in (1.80 m)	170 lb (77 kg)	1922-01-05	Dartmouth
G	10–11	Stan Noszka	6 ft 1 in (1.85 m)	185 lb (84 kg)	1920-09-09	Duquesne
G/F	7–9	Mel Riebe	5 ft 11 in (1.80 m)	180 lb (82 kg)	1916-07-12	Wooster
C	22	Ed Sadowski	6 ft 5 in (1.96 m)	240 lb (109 kg)	1917-07-11	Seton Hall
F	12	Art Spector	6 ft 4 in (1.93 m)	200 lb (91 kg)	1918-03-18	Villanova
G/F	13	Gene Stump	6 ft 2 in (1.88 m)	185 lb (84 kg)	1923-11-13	DePaul

Coaches
Head coach

Honey Russell

Assistant(s)

Danny Silva

Legend
- (DP) Unsigned draft pick
- (FA) Free agent
- (S) Suspended
- Injured

Roster

== Regular season ==
=== Season standings ===
#	Eastern Division				
#	Team	W	L	PCT	GB
1	x-Philadelphia Warriors	27	21	.563	–
2	x-New York Knicks	26	22	.542	1
3	x-Boston Celtics	20	28	.417	7
4	Providence Steamrollers	6	42	.125	21

=== Game log ===
#	Date	Opponent	Score	High points	Record
1	November 13	@ Baltimore	L 74–85	Sadowski, Simmons (16)	0–1
2	November 14	Philadelphia	L 74–79 (OT)	Ed Sadowski (27)	0–2
3	November 15	@ Washington	W 73–69	Ed Sadowski (14)	1–2
4	November 18	St. Louis	L 50–65	Ed Sadowski (14)	1–3
5	November 20	@ Philadelphia	W 67–57	Ed Sadowski (18)	2–3
6	November 21	Baltimore	L 73–89	Ed Sadowski (18)	2–4
7	November 22	@ Providence	W 65–62	Cecil Hankins (12)	3–4
8	November 25	New York	L 75–91	Ed Sadowski (15)	3–5
9	November 26	@ New York	W 65–63	Ed Sadowski (19)	4–5
10	November 28	Washington	W 92–83	Ed Sadowski (22)	5–5
11	December 2	Baltimore	L 69–77 (OT)	Ed Sadowski (18)	5–6
12	December 5	Providence	W 73–69	Ed Sadowski (24)	6–6
13	December 10	New York	L 75–79	Ed Sadowski (25)	6–7
14	December 12	Philadelphia	W 69–67	Mel Riebe (22)	7–7
15	December 17	Providence	W 67–66	Mel Riebe (17)	8–7
16	December 19	St. Louis	W 78–70	Ed Sadowski (30)	9–7
17	December 20	@ New York	L 58–70	Saul Mariaschin (20)	9–8
18	December 23	Chicago	L 75–83	Ed Sadowski (22)	9–9
19	December 27	@ Providence	W 74–63	Mel Riebe (15)	10–9
20	December 30	Philadelphia	W 70–64	Ed Sadowski (28)	11–9
21	January 1	@ St. Louis	L 48–58	Bulbs Ehlers (12)	11–10
22	January 3	@ Washington	L 60–95	Connie Simmons (12)	11–11
23	January 10	@ Providence	L 57–70	Ed Sadowski (19)	11–12
24	January 11	Washington	W 84–56	Mel Riebe (21)	12–12
25	January 16	Chicago	W 75–61	Ed Sadowski (23)	13–12
26	January 18	@ Chicago	L 48–72	Ed Sadowski (11)	13–13
27	January 22	@ Philadelphia	W 61–54	Noszka, Riebe, Sadowski (11)	14–13
28	January 23	New York	L 58–74	Mel Riebe (18)	14–14
29	January 25	@ St. Louis	L 54–72	Ed Sadowski (18)	14–15
30	January 27	Philadelphia	L 68–77	Ed Sadowski (21)	14–16
31	January 30	Providence	69–79	Ed Sadowski (22)	14–17
32	January 31	@ New York	L 64–66	Ed Sadowski (28)	14–18
33	February 6	New York	L 57–68	Ed Sadowski (18)	14–19
34	February 8	@ New York	L 68–80	Ed Sadowski (30)	14–20
35	February 12	@ Philadelphia	L 60–69	Ed Sadowski (20)	14–21
36	February 13	Providence	W 79–73	Ed Sadowski (23)	15–21
37	February 14	@ Washington	L 58–72	Ed Sadowski (16)	15–22
38	February 19	@ Baltimore	L 76–79 (OT)	Ed Sadowski (33)	15–23
39	February 22	Chicago	L 77–97	Mel Riebe (20)	15–24
40	February 26	@ St. Louis	L 92–94 (2OT)	Ed Sadowski (34)	15–25
41	February 27	@ Chicago	W 83–69	Ehlers, Sadowski (22)	16–25
42	February 29	Baltimore	W 65–62	Ed Sadowski (20)	17–25
43	March 4	@ Philadelphia	L 62–82	Ed Sadowski (16)	17–26
44	March 5	St. Louis	W 71–68	Ed Sadowski (32)	18–26
45	March 6	@ Baltimore	L 68–81	Mike Bloom (14)	18–27
46	March 13	@ Providence	W 86–64	Mel Riebe (22)	19–27
47	March 16	Washington	L 62–76	Ed Sadowski (18)	19–28
48	March 18	@ Chicago	W 77–72	Ed Sadowski (23)	20–28

== BAA Playoffs ==
1948 playoff game log
First Round: 1–2 (home: 1–2; road: 0–0)

Game	Date	Team	Score	High points	Location	Series
1	March 28	Chicago	L 72–79	Sadowski, Riebe (22)	Boston Garden	0–1
2	March 31	Chicago	W 81–77	Saul Mariaschin (17)	Boston Garden	1–1
3	April 2	Chicago	L 74–81	Ed Sadowski (26)	Boston Garden	1–2

1948 schedule

== Awards and records ==
- Ed Sadowski, All-NBA First Team

== Transactions ==
=== Trades ===
April 29, 1947	To Boston Celtics Cecil Hankins	To St. Louis Bombers Wyndol Gray
October 27, 1947	To Boston Celtics George Munroe; Cash	To St. Louis Bombers John Abramovic
February 9, 1948	To Boston Celtics Mike Bloom	To Baltimore Bullets Connie Simmons

=== Free agency ===
==== Additions ====
Player	Signed	Former team
John Janisch		Detroit Falcons
Saul Mariaschin		Harvard Crimson
Stan Noszka		Pittsburgh Ironmen
Mel Riebe		Cleveland Rebels
Ed Sadowski		Cleveland Rebels

==== Subtractions ====
Player	Reason left	New team
Al Brightman	Signed contract	Seattle Athletics
Hal Crisler	Retired from basketball to pursue career in American football	Washington Redskins (NFL)
Bob Duffy		
Don Eliason		
Warren Fenley		Brooklyn Gothams
Mel Hirsch		
Jerry Kelly	Signed contract	Providence Steamrollers
Harold Kottman	Signed contract	St. Paul Saints
Dick Murphy	Signed contract	Elizabeth Braves
John Simmons	Signed contract	Kansas City Blues
Virgil Vaughn		Syracuse Nationals
