= Crisler =

Crisler may refer to:

- Fritz Crisler (1899–1982), American college football coach
  - Crisler Center, an indoor arena located in Ann Arbor, Michigan
- Harold Crisler (1923–1987), American football player
- Jalen Crisler (born 1994), American soccer player
