= 1946–47 Boston Celtics season =

Season of the Basketball Association of America (NBA) Boston Celtics team

- Head coach: Honey Russell
- Owners: Walter A. Brown
- Arena: Boston Arena; Boston Garden

Results
- Record: 22–38 (.367)
- Place: Division: 5th (Eastern)
- Playoff finish: Did not qualify
- Stats at Basketball Reference
- Radio: WMEX

The 1946–47 Boston Celtics season was the first season of the Boston Celtics in the Basketball Association of America (BAA/NBA). Walter A. Brown was the man who was responsible for starting the franchise. In June 1946, Brown, who operated the Boston Garden arena and was part of the National Hockey League's Boston Bruins, was the driving force behind both the Basketball Association of America and the Celtics' birth. After considering several team names, including Whirlwinds, Unicorns, and Olympics, Brown opted for the Celtics as the official team name, though it also involved Brown paying the likes of Jim Furay, the team manager of the Original Celtics franchise, to allow for the Boston Celtics to use the rights of the famous Celtics name for Boston's own basketball team since Furay's own team was going to be reactivated as the Troy Celtics in the older, technically rivaling American Basketball League for what would later become its final season of play there. Walter A. Brown had hoped to grab the attention of Boston's large Irish American population. John David "Honey" Russell was hired as the first Celtics coach (though he wasn't their first option for the first ever head coach at the time since Frank Keaney was intended to be their first head coaching option for the team at the time), and the team soon began its inaugural season, losing its first game 59–53 to the Providence Steamrollers. The Celtics later won their first game of the season against the Toronto Huskies on November 16, 1946. Greater details on their first season would be explored in Charley Rosen's book called "The First Tip-Off: The Incredible Story of the Birth of the NBA", with an entire chapter dedicated to the Celtics' first season in the BAA/NBA alongside the various highs and lows (mostly lows from this specific season) that would eventually lead to them becoming the franchise that they are today.

== Roster ==
Due to this being the first season in the franchise's history, the BAA didn't utilize a draft system like they would in future seasons of the BAA/NBA and instead relied upon some combination of the head coach and the general manager of the team finding and signing players in time to start out their training camp period for the season. For the Celtics, they looked at players that head coach Honey Russell had largely known from either the older American Basketball League or the otherwise defunct Eastern Basketball League for training camp invites, such as former (original) Baltimore Bullets and Trenton Tigers player Virgil Vaughn from Western Kentucky University, former New York Westchesters/Westchester Indians and Brooklyn Gothams player Warren Fenley from Manhattan College, former Brooklyn Indians and Original Celtics guard Mel Hirsch from Brooklyn College, former (original) Baltimore Bullets and Trenton Tigers player Art Spector from Villanova University, former New York Westchesters/Westchester Indians and Brooklyn Gothams player Red Wallace from the University of Scranton, former Jersey Reds, Brooklyn Visitations, Baltimore Clippers, New York Jewels, and Brooklyn Gothams player Tony Kappen from Forest Hills High School, John Simmons from New York University, Connie Simmons from Flushing High School, former Wilkes-Barre Barons player Al Brightman from Morris Harvey College, Harold Kottman from Culver–Stockton College, Wyndol Gray from Bowling Green State University, and former Brooklyn Indians, Wilmington Bombers, Paterson Crescents, and rivaling NBL team Rochester Royals player Chuck Connors from Seton Hall College to open up their first ever season of play.

1946–47 Boston Celtics roster
Players

Pos.	No.	Player	Height	Weight	DOB	From
F	6–18	Al Brightman	6 ft 2 in (1.88 m)	195 lb (88 kg)	1923-09-22	Morris Harvey College
F/C	11	Chuck Connors	6 ft 5 in (1.96 m)	190 lb (86 kg)	1921-04-10	Seton Hall
F	15	Hal Crisler	6 ft 3 in (1.91 m)	215 lb (98 kg)	1923-12-31	Iowa State
F	17	Bob Duffy	6 ft 4 in (1.93 m)	175 lb (79 kg)	1922-07-05	Colgate
F	7	Warren Fenley	6 ft 3 in (1.91 m)	190 lb (86 kg)	1922-02-08	Manhattan
G	15	Jack Garfinkel	6 ft 0 in (1.83 m)	190 lb (86 kg)	1918-06-13	St. John's
G/F	4	Wyndol Gray	6 ft 1 in (1.85 m)	175 lb (79 kg)	1922-03-20	Bowling Green
G	3	Mel Hirsch	5 ft 6 in (1.68 m)	165 lb (75 kg)	1921-07-31	Brooklyn
G	3	Charlie Hoefer	5 ft 9 in (1.75 m)	158 lb (72 kg)	1921-09-16	Queens College
F	14–24	Jerry Kelly	6 ft 2 in (1.88 m)	172 lb (78 kg)	1918-06-14	Marshall
C	9	Harold Kottman	6 ft 8 in (2.03 m)	220 lb (100 kg)	1922-08-22	Culver–Stockton
G	5	Dick Murphy	6 ft 1 in (1.85 m)	175 lb (79 kg)	1921-03-10	Manhattan
F/C	10	Connie Simmons	6 ft 8 in (2.03 m)	222 lb (101 kg)	1925-03-15	Flushing HS (NY)
G	6	John Simmons	6 ft 1 in (1.85 m)	184 lb (83 kg)	1924-07-07	NYU
F	12	Art Spector	6 ft 4 in (1.93 m)	200 lb (91 kg)	1920-10-17	Villanova
F/C	17	Virgil Vaughn	6 ft 4 in (1.93 m)	205 lb (93 kg)	1918-05-15	Western Kentucky

Coaches
Head coach
- Honey Russell
Assistant(s)
- Danny Silva

Legend
- (DP) Unsigned draft pick
- (FA) Free agent
- (S) Suspended
- Injured

Roster

== Regular season ==
On November 5, the Celtics played their first game at the Boston Arena in front of 4,329 fans. The game would be delayed for an hour when the wooden backboard was damaged after a practice shot (not a slam dunk) from Chuck Connors occurred during warm-ups, with the team getting their spare backboard from the occupied (at that point in time) Boston Garden, which was hosting a rodeo show at the time. While the team tried to entertain the crowd with a three-on-three match of sorts with the single remaining backboard, by the time the spare backboard was installed, it was suggested that only half of the original crowd remained to actually watch the game properly. After the backboard was repaired, the Celtics lost to the Chicago Stags by a score 57–55. This would become the first-ever broken backboard in BAA/NBA history.

=== Season standings ===
#	Eastern Division				
#	Team	W	L	PCT	GB
1	x-Washington Capitols	49	11	.817	–
2	x-Philadelphia Warriors	35	25	.583	14
3	x-New York Knicks	33	27	.550	16
4	Providence Steamrollers	28	32	.467	21
5	Boston Celtics	22	38	.367	27
6	Toronto Huskies	22	38	.367	27

=== Game log ===
1946–47 Game Log
November

Game	Date	Opponent	Score	Location/Attendance	High points	Record
1	November 2	@ Providence Steamrollers	53–59	Rhode Island Auditorium	Red Wallace (9)	0–1
2	November 5	Chicago Stags	55–57	Boston Arena	John Simmons (13)	0–2
3	November 9	@ Detroit Falcons	46–69	Detroit Olympia	Art Spector (12)	0–3
4	November 13	@ Chicago Stags	61–71	Chicago Stadium	John Simmons (14)	0–4
5	November 14	@ St. Louis Bombers	62–64	St. Louis Arena	Gray, Wallace (12)	0–5
6	November 16	Toronto Huskies	53–49	Boston Garden	Wyndol Gray (13)	1–5
7	November 21	St. Louis Bombers	53–65	Boston Garden	Connie Simmons (9)	1–6
8	November 22	@ Toronto Huskies	82–83	Maple Leaf Gardens	Connie Simmons (18)	1–7
9	November 23	@ Detroit Falcons	46–54	Detroit Olympia	Connie Simmons (15)	1–8
10	November 25	Providence Steam Rollers	59–71	Boston Garden	John Simmons (14)	1–9
11	November 26	Philadelphia Warriors	54–66	Philadelphia Arena	Connie Simmons (15)	1–10
12	November 28	Pittsburgh Ironmen	59–55	Boston Garden	Harold Kottman (19)	2–10

December

Game	Date	Opponent	Score	Location/Attendance	High points	Record
13	December 1	@ Chicago Stags	56–66	Chicago Stadium	Al Brightman (26)	2–11
14	December 2	@ Pittsburgh Ironmen	46–44	Duquesne Gardens	Al Brightman (11)	3–11
15	December 5	Detroit Falcons	61–65	Boston Garden	Connie Simmons (10)	3–12
16	December 7	New York Knickerbockers	65–90	Boston Garden	Gray, Kottman (15)	3–13
17	December 8	@ New York Knickerbockers	44–62	Madison Square Garden	Wyndol Gray (13)	3–14
18	December 12	Detroit Falcons	73–66	Boston Garden	Jerry Kelly (21)	4–14
19	December 14	Philadelphia Warriors	77–65 (OT)	Boston Garden	Red Wallace (19)	5–14
20	December 19	St. Louis Bombers	74–76	Boston Garden	Al Brightman (13)	5–15
21	December 22	@ St. Louis Bombers	53–65 (OT)	St. Louis Arena	Chuck Connors (14)	5–16
22	December 23	@ Pittsburgh Ironmen	54–64	Duquesne Gardens	C. Simmons, Spector (9)	5–17
23	December 27	Philadelphia Warriors	60–63	Boston Arena	Al Brightman (17)	5–18
24	December 28	@ Providence Steam Rollers	68–80	Rhode Island Auditorium	Wyndol Gray (17)	5–19
25	December 30	Washington Capitols	60–70 (OT)	Boston Arena	Connie Simmons (19)	5–20

January

Game	Date	Opponent	Score	Location/Attendance	High points	Record
26	January 3	@ Toronto Huskies	58–53	Maple Leaf Gardens	Al Brightman (21)	6–20
27	January 6	Cleveland Rebels	53–64	Boston Arena	Connors, Gray (15)	6–21
28	January 10	New York Knicks	66–62	Boston Arena	Al Brightman (18)	7–21
29	January 11	@ Providence Steam Rollers	73–72	Rhode Island Auditorium	Al Brightman (17)	8–21
30	January 16	Washington Capitols	47–38	Boston Garden	Al Brightman (14)	9–21
31	January 18	@ New York Knickerbockers	58–45	Madison Square Garden	Al Brightman (19)	10–21
32	January 20	Chicago Stags	54–81	Boston Garden	Wyndol Gray (13)	10–22
33	January 21	@ Philadelphia Warriors	43–59	Philadelphia Arena	John Simmons (10)	10−23
34	January 23	Pittsburgh Ironmen	48–43	Boston Garden	Charlie Hoefer (11)	11–23
35	January 25	@ New York Knickerbockers	52–46	Madison Square Garden	Al Brightman (17)	11–24
36	January 27	Washington Capitols	57–80	Boston Garden	Connie Simmons (12)	12–24
37	January 29	@ Washington Capitols	57–69	Uline Arena	Connie Simmons (11)	12–25
38	January 30	Pittsburgh Ironmen	66–51	Boston Garden	Connie Simmons (18)	13–25

February

Game	Date	Opponent	Score	Location/Attendance	High points	Record
39	February 3	Philadelphia Warriors	55–61	Boston Garden	Connie Simmons (17)	13–26
40	February 6	New York Knickerbockers	49–48	Boston Garden	Connie Simmons (14)	14–26
41	February 13	St. Louis Bombers	64–54	Boston Garden	Connie Simmons (17)	15–26
42	February 16	@ Chicago Stags	77–84	Chicago Stadium	Connie Simmons (25)	15–27
43	February 18	@ Cleveland Rebels	73–84	Cleveland Arena	Connie Simmons (21)	15–28
44	February 19	@ Detroit Falcons	57–51	Detroit Olympia	Connie Simmons (18)	16–28
45	February 21	@ Toronto Huskies	61–67	Maple Leaf Gardens	Connie Simmons (26)	16–29
46	February 23	Providence Steam Rollers	55–67	Boston Arena	Al Brightman (14)	16–30
47	February 24	@ Washington Capitals	59–83	Uline Arena	Al Brightman (14)	16–31
48	February 28	Cleveland Rebels	69–62	Boston Arena	Al Brightman (22)	17–31

March

Game	Date	Opponent	Score	Location/Attendance	High points	Record
49	March 1	@ Washington Capitols	52–75	Uline Arena	Jack Garfinkel (18)	17–32
50	March 6	Detroit Falcons	74–65	Boston Garden	Connie Simmons (19)	18–32
50	March 8	Toronto Huskies	67–65	Boston Garden	Connie Simmons (19)	19–32
52	March 10	Providence Steam Rollers	70–87	Boston Garden	John Simmons (17)	19–33
53	March 12	Toronto Huskies	69–57	Boston Garden	Hoefer, J. Simmons (13)	20–33
54	March 13	@ Philadelphia Warriors	57–81	Philadelphia Arena	Charlie Hoefer (12)	20–34
55	March 18	Cleveland Rebels	58–67	Boston Garden	Connie Simmons (14)	20–35
56	March 24	Chicago Stags	69–80	Boston Garden	Connie Simmons (17)	20–36
57	March 25	@ Cleveland Rebels	64–72	Cleveland Arena	Art Spector (19)	20–37
58	March 26	Pittsburgh Ironmen	74–61	Duquesne Gardens	Al Brightman (17)	21–37
59	March 29	@ St. Louis Bombers	55–59	St. Louis Arena	Al Brightman (15)	21–38
60	March 30	@ Cleveland Rebels	71–66	Cleveland Arena	Connie Simmons (20)	22–38

1946–47 Schedule

== Player stats ==
=== Season ===
Player	GP	GS	MPG	FG%	3P%	FT%	RPG	AST	SPG	BPG	PPG
Connie Simmons	60			.320		.677		62			10.3
Al Brightman	58			.256		.627		60			9.8
Wyndol Gray	55			.292		.581		47			6.4
Art Spector	55			.267		.553		46			6.0
Jerry Kelly	43			.291		.667		24			6.0
Charlie Hoefer	35			.241		.634		24			6.0
Red Wallace	24			.246		.438		20			5.5
Johnny Simmons	60			.280		.614		29			5.3
Chuck Connors	49			.247		.464		40			4.6
Jack Garfinkel	40			.266		.607		58			4.5
Harold Kottman	53			.314		.465		17			3.1
Warren Fenley	33			.225		.511		16			2.6
Tony Kappen	18			.275		.632		6			4.1
Virgil Vaughn	17			.192		.536		10			2.6
Mel Hirsch	13			.200		.500		10			1.5
Dick Murphy	7			.059		.000		3			0.9
Moe Becker	6			.227		.750		1			2.2
Bob Duffy	6			.286		1.000		0			1.3
Hal Crisler	4			.333		1.000		0			1.5
Don Eliason	1			.000		–		0			0.0

== Transactions ==
=== Trades ===
December 12, 1946	To Boston Celtics Moe Becker	To Pittsburgh Ironmen Tony Kappen
January 2, 1947	To the Boston Celtics Charlie Hoefer	To the Toronto Huskies Red Wallace

=== Purchases ===
Player	Date bought	Previous team
Jack Garfinkel	January 16, 1947	Rochester Royals

== Season losses ==
Throughout this season, the Boston Celtics only had an average total of 1,682 paid attendees per game, with net receipts totaling up to $57,875 for the season and estimated losses totaling up to around $200,000 for this season. Despite the high amount of money lost during that period of time, the Boston Celtics would be one of six teams to fully confirm their interest in staying on board for another season while playing in the BAA (likely because the team ownership's involvement with the Boston Bruins in the National Hockey League (NHL) would help offset any financial losses caused by the BAA during this short-term period of time). To this day, they join the New York Knicks as the only inaugural BAA/NBA team to still operate in their original location, with the Golden State Warriors (formerly known as the Philadelphia Warriors) also being the only other BAA/NBA team from this time still existing in the present day.
