= Don Eliason =

American basketball and football player (1918–2003)

- Eliason with the Boston Celtics during the 1946–47 season

Personal information
- Born: July 24, 1918 Owatonna, Minnesota, U.S.
- Died: August 18, 2003 (aged 85)
- Listed height: 6 ft 2 in (1.88 m)
- Listed weight: 210 lb (95 kg)

Career information
- High school: Harding (Saint Paul, Minnesota)
- College: Hamline
- Playing career: 1946–1947
- Position: Forward
- Number: 14

Career history
- 1946: Boston Celtics
- Stats at NBA.com
- Stats at Basketball Reference

Donald Carlton Eliason (July 24, 1918 – August 18, 2003) was an American basketball and football player. He played one season in the Basketball Association of America (BAA) and two seasons in the National Football League (NFL).

== Early life ==
Eliason was born in 1917 in Owatonna, Minnesota.

Eliason attended Hamline University where he played baseball, basketball and football. In 1939, he earned all-state honors, playing at the tackle position for the Hamline football team. In 1940, he was selected as the captain and played at fullback. Eliason graduated in 1942. He was inducted into the Hamline University Athletic Hall of Fame in 1976, as well as the school's Row of Honor in Hutton Arena in 2010.

== Football career ==
In 1942, he played four games for the Brooklyn Dodgers of the National Football League (NFL). His playing career was cut short in November 1942 when he was drafted into the U.S. Army during World War II. While in the service, he played on the Fort Warren travelling football team.

After the war, Eliason joined the NFL Boston Yanks. He appeared in four games for the Yanks during the 1946 season.

== Basketball career ==
In the BAA, Eliason was a member of the Boston Celtics during their inaugural 1946–47 season. He played in one game, missing his only field goal attempt. He is one of the few to have played in both the NFL and the BAA or its successor, the National Basketball Association. Another Yanks football player, Harold Crisler, also played for the Celtics that season.

== Later life ==
After his sporting career, Eliason was a science teacher and coach at Excelsior and Minnetonka high schools. He worked as a bonded representative for a brokerage firm before his retirement. Eliason was recognised for his volunteer work with the intellectually disabled.

== BAA career statistics ==
Legend
GP	Games played
FG%	Field-goal percentage
FT%	Free-throw percentage
APG	Assists per game
PPG	Points per game

=== Regular season ===
Year	Team	GP	FG%	FT%	APG	PPG
1946–47	Boston	1	.000	.000	.0	.0
Career		1	.000	.000	.0	.0
