= Art Spector =

American basketball player (1920–1987)

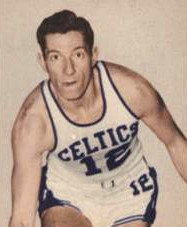
- Spector in 1948

Personal information
- Born: October 17, 1920 Philadelphia, Pennsylvania, U.S.
- Died: June 18, 1987 (aged 66) New York City, New York, U.S.
- Listed height: 6 ft 4 in (1.93 m)
- Listed weight: 200 lb (91 kg)

Career information
- High school: West Philadelphia (Philadelphia, Pennsylvania)
- College: Villanova (1940–1941)
- Playing career: 1946–1950
- Position: Forward
- Number: 12

Career history
- 1944–1946: Baltimore Bullets
- 1946–1950: Boston Celtics

Career statistics
- Points: 852
- Assist: 143
- Stats at NBA.com
- Stats at Basketball Reference

Arthur Edward Spector (nicknamed "Speed"; 17 October 1920 – 18 June 1987) was an American basketball player. He played as a forward for the Boston Celtics from 1946 to 1950.

== Early life and education ==
Spector was born in Philadelphia, Pennsylvania, and lived in West Philadelphia. He was Jewish. His grandson is American former soccer player Jonathan Spector.

Spector attended and played basketball first at West Philadelphia High School, where he was team captain. He then played basketball at Villanova University, graduating in 1941.

== Professional basketball ==
He was the first player ever to be signed by the Boston Celtics. Later, he was a scout for the Celtics. He played as a forward for the Celtics from 1946 to 1950.

He lived later in Newtown, Connecticut.

=== BAA and NBA career statistics ===
Legend
GP	Games played	FG%	Field-goal percentage
FT%	Free-throw percentage	APG	Assists per game
PPG	Points per game	**Bold**	Career high

=== Regular season ===
Year	Team	GP	FG%	FT%	APG	PPG
1946–47	Boston	55	.267	.553	.8	**6.0**
1947–48	Boston	48	.276	**.652**	.4	4.0
1948–49	Boston	**59**	**.300**	.552	**1.3**	5.5
1949–50	Boston	7	.167	.250	.4	.7
Career		169	.280	.575	.8	5.0

=== Playoffs ===
Year	Team	GP	FG%	FT%	APG	PPG
1948	Boston	3	.222	.500	.0	2.0
Career		3	.222	.500	.0	2.0
