= Jack Garfinkel =

American basketball player

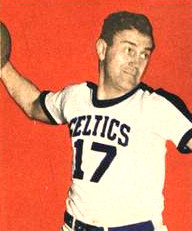
- Garfinkel in 1948

Personal information
- Born: June 13, 1918 Brooklyn, New York, U.S.
- Died: August 14, 2013 (aged 95)
- Listed height: 6 ft 0 in (1.83 m)
- Listed weight: 190 lb (86 kg)

Career information
- High school: Thomas Jefferson (Brooklyn, New York)
- College: St. John's (1938–1941)
- Playing career: 1946–1949
- Position: Guard
- Number: 15, 21

Career history
- 1944–1945: Philadelphia Sphas
- 1945–1946: Rochester Royals
- 1946–1949: Boston Celtics

Career highlights
- NBL champion (1946); Haggerty Award (1941)

Career BAA statistics
- Points: 476
- Rebounds: Not tracked
- Assists: 134
- Stats at NBA.com
- Stats at Basketball Reference

Jacob "Dutch" Garfinkel (June 13, 1918 – August 14, 2013) was an American basketball player.

Garfinkel attended Thomas Jefferson High School in Brooklyn and then nearby St. John's University to play for future Hall of Fame coach Joe Lapchick. In 1941, he won the Haggerty Award, given to the top player in the New York City metropolitan area.

After his college career was over, Garfinkel served in the United States Army during World War II. He then played for the Philadelphia Sphas of the American Basketball League, the Rochester Royals of the National Basketball League (NBL), and finally settled in with the Boston Celtics of the Basketball Association of America (BAA), where he was a member of the franchise's first team in 1946–47. Garfinkel lasted three seasons with the Celtics, but his career ended prior to the NBL/BAA merger that formed the National Basketball Association in 1949.

After his playing days were over, Garfinkel became a basketball coach and official. He died on August 14, 2013. He was the last surviving player of the inaugural Celtics team.

== BAA career statistics ==
Legend
GP	Games played	FG%	Field-goal percentage
FT%	Free-throw percentage	APG	Assists per game
PPG	Points per game	**Bold**	Career high

=== Regular season ===
Year	Team	GP	FG%	FT%	APG	PPG
1946–47	Boston	40	.266	.607	1.5	4.5
1947–48	Boston	**43**	**.300**	**.761**	1.4	**6.1**
1948–49	Boston	9	.171	.714	**1.9**	3.8
Career		92	.275	.705	1.5	5.2

=== Playoffs ===
Year	Team	GP	FG%	FT%	APG	PPG
1948	Boston	3	.304	.800	2.3	7.3
Career		3	.304	.800	2.3	7.3

== See also ==
- List of select Jewish basketball players
