= Jerry Kelly (basketball) =

American basketball player (1918-1996)

Personal information
- Born: June 14, 1918 Union City, New Jersey, U.S.
- Died: July 23, 1996 (aged 78) Carson City, Nevada, U.S.
- Listed height: 6 ft 2 in (1.88 m)
- Listed weight: 172 lb (78 kg)

Career information
- College: Marshall
- Playing career: 1944–1949
- Position: Guard
- Number: 14, 24, 13

Career history
- 1944–1946: Washington Capitols / Paterson Crescents
- 1946: Jersey City Atoms
- 1946–1947: Boston Celtics
- 1947: Providence Steamrollers
- 1948: Pottsville Packers
- 1948–1949: Lancaster Red Roses
- Stats at NBA.com
- Stats at Basketball Reference

Gerard Allan Kelly (June 14, 1918 – July 23, 1996) was an American professional basketball player. His career took him to the American Basketball League, Basketball Association of America, and Eastern Professional Basketball League between 1944 and 1949.

== BAA career statistics ==
Legend
GP	Games played	FG%	Field-goal percentage
FT%	Free-throw percentage	APG	Assists per game
PPG	Points per game	**Bold**	Career high

=== Regular season ===
Year	Team	GP	FG%	FT%	APG	PPG
1946–47	Boston	**43**	.291	**.667**	**.5**	**6.0**
1947–48	Providence	3	**.300**	.000	.0	2.0
Career		46	.291	.661	.5	5.7
