= Connie Simmons =

American basketball player

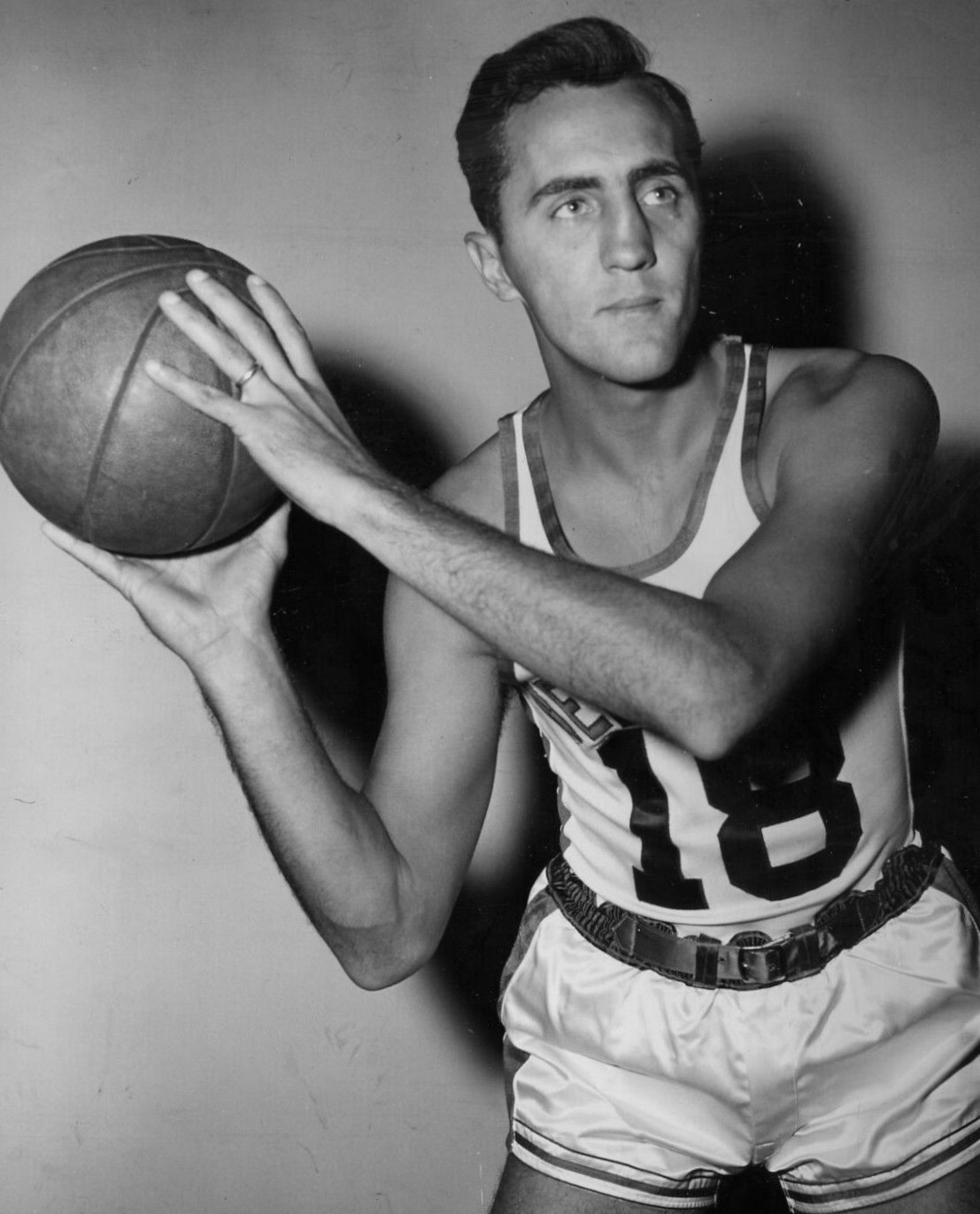
- Simmons, circa 1953

Personal information
- Born: March 15, 1925 Newark, New Jersey, U.S.
- Died: April 15, 1989 (aged 64)
- Listed height: 6 ft 8 in (2.03 m)
- Listed weight: 222 lb (101 kg)

Career information
- High school: Flushing (Flushing, New York)
- Playing career: 1946–1956
- Position: Center / power forward
- Number: 10, 33, 11, 6, 18, 4

Career history
- 1946–1948: Boston Celtics
- 1948–1949: Baltimore Bullets
- 1949–1954: New York Knicks
- 1954: Baltimore Bullets
- 1954–1955: Syracuse Nationals
- 1955–1956: Rochester Royals

Career highlights
- BAA champion (1948); NBA champion (1955)

Career BAA/NBA statistics
- Points: 5,859
- Rebounds: 2,294
- Assists: 940
- Stats at NBA.com
- Stats at Basketball Reference

Cornelius Leo "Connie" Simmons (March 15, 1925 – April 15, 1989) was an American professional basketball player. He was born in Newark, New Jersey.

A 6'8" forward/center from Flushing High School in New York City, Simmons played ten seasons (1946–56) in the National Basketball Association as a member of the Boston Celtics, Baltimore Bullets, New York Knicks, Syracuse Nationals and Rochester Royals. He averaged 9.8 points per game and 6.2 rebounds per game in his career and was a member of two league championship teams: the 1948 Bullets and the 1955 Nationals. He was the second player to enter the NBA without having played in college, after Tony Kappen.

Connie was the brother of professional basketball and baseball player Johnny Simmons.

== BAA/NBA career statistics ==
Legend
GP	Games played	GS	Games started	MPG	Minutes per game
FG%	Field goal percentage	3P%	3-point field goal percentage	FT%	Free throw percentage
RPG	Rebounds per game	APG	Assists per game	SPG	Steals per game
BPG	Blocks per game	PPG	Points per game	**Bold**	Career high
†	Won an NBA championship

=== Regular season ===
Year	Team	GP	MPG	FG%	FT%	RPG	APG	PPG
1946–47	Boston	60	–	.320	.677	–	1.0	10.3
1947–48	Boston	32	–	.295	.593	–	.5	7.8
1947–48†	Baltimore	13	–	.302	.556	–	.5	10.6
1948–49	Baltimore	60	–	.377	.683	–	1.9	**13.0**
1949–50	New York	60	–	.331	.662	–	1.7	11.3
1950–51	New York	66	–	.374	.702	6.5	1.8	9.2
1951–52	New York	66	23.6	**.378**	.689	**7.1**	1.8	9.5
1952–53	New York	65	26.3	.377	**.732**	7.0	**2.0**	11.2
1953–54	New York	**72**	**27.9**	.358	.689	6.7	1.8	10.0
1954–55	Baltimore / Syracuse	36	23.9	.357	.632	6.1	1.7	9.6
1955–56	Rochester	68	13.3	.336	.605	3.5	1.2	5.4
Career		598	22.9	.351	.678	6.2	1.6	9.8

=== Playoffs ===
Year	Team	GP	MPG	FG%	FT%	RPG	APG	PPG
1948†	Baltimore	11	–	.371	.744	–	1.0	**17.1**
1949	Baltimore	3	–	.351	.759	–	2.3	16.0
1950	New York	5	–	.275	**.952**	–	1.4	8.4
1951	New York	**14**	–	.364	.618	6.7	1.7	10.9
1952	New York	**14**	30.5	**.464**	.764	7.7	.9	15.9
1953	New York	11	**31.0**	.367	.729	7.5	2.3	13.2
1954	New York	4	27.8	.323	.694	**8.3**	**2.5**	11.3
Career		62	30.3	.382	.731	7.4	1.5	13.6
