= Saul Mariaschin =

American basketball player (1924–1990)

Personal information
- Born: August 24, 1924
- Died: December 20, 1990 (aged 66) Alta, Utah, U.S.
- Listed height: 5 ft 11 in (1.80 m)
- Listed weight: 165 lb (75 kg)

Career information
- College: Syracuse (1942–1943); Harvard (1945–1947)
- BAA draft: 1947: 7th round, 63rd overall pick
- Drafted by: Washington Capitols
- Position: Guard
- Number: 4

Career history
- 1947–1948: Boston Celtics
- Stats at NBA.com
- Stats at Basketball Reference

Saul William Marsch (born Saul George Mariaschin; August 10, 1924 – December 20, 1990) was an American professional basketball player. He played college basketball for the Syracuse Orange for one season in 1942–43 before leaving to join the United States Navy during World War II. He played his final two years of college for the Harvard Crimson, helping the team to its first appearance in the NCAA tournament after achieving a 19–1 record. It would be the only time Harvard would reach the tournament for 66 years, until the 2011–12 team reached the Second Round in 2012.

Mariaschin was selected in the 1947 BAA draft by the Washington Capitols, but never played for the team. He instead signed with the Boston Celtics, and played for the team during the 1947–48 season. Mariaschin was the first and only player from Harvard to reach the BAA/NBA postseason until Jeremy Lin did so with the Houston Rockets in 2013.

Mariaschin died in 1990 during a skiing vacation.

== BAA career statistics ==
Legend
GP	Games played
FG%	Field-goal percentage
FT%	Free-throw percentage
APG	Assists per game
PPG	Points per game

=== Regular season ===
Year	Team	GP	FG%	FT%	APG	PPG
1947–48	Boston	43	.270	.709	1.4	7.7
Career		43	.270	.709	1.4	7.7

=== Playoffs ===
Year	Team	GP	FG%	FT%	APG	PPG
1947–48	Boston	3	.238	.643	0.3	9.7
Career		3	.238	.643	0.3	9.7
