= Al Brightman =

American basketball player and coach

- Brightman with the Boston Celtics during the 1946–47 season

Personal information
- Born: September 22, 1923 Eureka, California, U.S.
- Died: June 10, 1992 (aged 68) Portland, Oregon, U.S.
- Listed height: 6 ft 2 in (1.88 m)
- Listed weight: 195 lb (88 kg)

Career information
- High school: Wilson Classical (Long Beach, California)
- College: Charleston (1945–1946)
- Playing career: 1946–1948
- Position: Forward
- Number: 8, 16
- Coaching career: 1947–1968

Career history

Playing
- 1946–1947: Boston Celtics
- 1947–1948: Seattle Athletics

Coaching
- 1947–1948: Seattle Athletics
- 1948–1956: Seattle University
- 1961–1962: San Francisco Saints
- 1962: Long Beach Chiefs
- 1967–1968: Anaheim Amigos

Career highlights
- California Mr. Basketball (1941)
- Stats at NBA.com
- Stats at Basketball Reference

Horace Albert Brightman (September 22, 1923 – June 10, 1992) was an American professional basketball player and coach.

Brightman played for the Boston Celtics of the Basketball Association of America during the 1946–47 season. He served as a player-coach for the Seattle Athletics of the Pacific Coast Professional Basketball League during the 1947–48 season.

Brightman was the head coach of the Seattle Redhawks from 1948 to 1956. He took the team to national prominence and attained a 180–68 record. Brightman unexpectedly left his role following an altercation with UCLA Bruins coach John Wooden during a 1956 game and struggled to return to the collegiate ranks. He had brief stints as a head coach in the American Basketball League and the American Basketball Association during the 1960s before retiring permanently from coaching. Brightman spent the rest of his life as an apartment manager until his death in 1992.

== Early life ==
Brightman was born in Eureka, California. He attended Woodrow Wilson Classical High School in Long Beach, California. Brightman averaged a city-record 22.7 points per game and was selected as the California Interscholastic Federation Player of the Year in 1941. He had a short stint playing baseball as a catcher with the Cleveland Indians organisation as a 17-year-old before his career was ended when he injured his shoulder.

== Playing career ==
Brightman played college basketball for Morris Harvey College (now University of Charleston) during the 1945–46 season. He averaged 22 points per game.

Brightman played 58 games for the Boston Celtics of the Basketball Association of America (BAA) during the league's inaugural 1946–47 season. He averaged 9.8 points per game and was the first Celtics player to score 20 points in a regular season game.

Brightman relocated to Seattle with his wife after making a visit there to see his parents. He joined the Seattle Athletics of the Pacific Coast Professional Basketball League as a player-coach. Brightman was the team's leading scorer and only All-League selection; the league went defunct in 1948.

From 1950 to 1952, Brightman played for the Madigan Generals, an independent semiprofessional basketball team.

== Coaching career ==
=== Seattle Chieftains ===
On August 21, 1948, Brightman was hired by Seattle University as head coach of the Chieftains basketball team. He recorded 12–14 and 12–17 records during his first two seasons. Brightman saw an improvement when he recruited the O'Brien twins, Johnny and Eddie, after playing them in a semiprofessional baseball game in Wichita, Kansas, in 1950. Brightman and the O'Briens led the Chieftains to a 90–17 record in three seasons and turned the team into a nationally recognised program. The Chieftains notably defeated the Harlem Globetrotters 84–81 in a 1952 game.

Brightman was ahead of his time by eschewing the methodical pace used by most collegiate teams and encouraging his players to perform at an ultra-fast tempo. He did not create scouting reports about his opponents. Brightman's teams made four appearances in the NCAA tournament and one in the National Invitation Tournament (NIT). At the age of 29, he became the youngest collegiate coach to achieve 100 wins.

On March 19, 1956, the Chieftains played the UCLA Bruins in the 1956 NCAA basketball tournament. The game was a physical affair that involved frequent fouling of Chieftains players by the Bruins. Brightman, upset over the Bruins' treatment of his players, confronted Bruins head coach, John Wooden, on the sidelines with a "wordy battle." The Chieftains lost 94–70; Brightman was reported as trying to start a fight with Wooden after the game. Three days later, Brightman abruptly resigned from his $8,000 per year role as Seattle's head basketball and baseball coach. He denied any link to his incident with Wooden but instead indicated that he had secured a deal to coach a semiprofessional baseball team in Canada. It was revealed years later that Brightman had not resigned but had been provided with "an opportunity to resign"; he never revealed the reason for his departure. Elgin Baylor, who was to join the Chieftains the following season, alleged that Brightman was drunk during the game and forced to resign. Brightman amassed a 180–68 record during his eight seasons with the Chieftains.

=== Coaching hiatus ===
Brightman applied for coaching positions at other colleges but was overlooked because he had failed to obtain a college degree. He was hired as a television host on Channel 13 in Seattle six weeks after leaving Seattle University and became a local television celebrity. Brightman started on weekday afternoon shows before being moved to early morning programming including hosting a pre-dawn cooking show titled Al's Cellar Café. Brightman left the job by late 1956 and moved to Long Beach, California, to run a restaurant and then worked at a Douglas Aircraft Company plant. He unsuccessfully applied for the head coaching position of the Washington State Cougars in 1958 but was beaten by his former Madigan Generals teammate, Marv Harshman. The loss motivated Brightman to attain a bachelor's degree in English from Long Beach State University.

=== Return to coaching ===
Brightman coached basketball at Garden Grove High School and sold automobiles to make an income while earning his degree. He was named head coach for the San Francisco Saints of the American Basketball League (ABL) for the 1961–62 season. Brightman returned to Long Beach the following season to coach the Long Beach Chiefs before the ABL folded at the end of 1962. He stated in an interview after losing his position: "I have died every year for six years since I left the Chieftains."

Brightman coached high school and Amateur Athletic Union (AAU) basketball until 1967. He was appointed head coach for the Anaheim Amigos of the American Basketball Association (ABA) for the 1967–68 season. He was fired after attaining a 12–24 record.

== Later life ==
Brightman never coached basketball again. He was a longtime operator of a California resort owned by Chuck Connors who was his teammate on the Boston Celtics. Brightman relocated to Maitland, Florida, in 1971 and worked for a property management business for two years. He moved to Portland, Oregon, and spent the remainder of his working life managing apartment houses.

Brightman was diagnosed with pancreatic cancer in 1992. He died on June 10 of that year at the age of 68. Brightman was survived by his wife and seven children.

== Legacy ==
Brightman was inducted into the Seattle University Athletics Hall of Fame in 2011.

== BAA career statistics ==
Legend
GP	Games played
FG%	Field-goal percentage
FT%	Free-throw percentage
APG	Assists per game
PPG	Points per game

=== Regular season ===
Year	Team	GP	FG%	FT%	APG	PPG
1946–47	Boston	58	.256	.627	1.0	9.8
Career		58	.256	.627	1.0	9.8

== Head coaching record ==
=== College ===
Record table
Season	Team	Overall	Conference	Standing	Postseason
Seattle Chieftains (Independent) (1948–1956)
1948–49	Seattle	12–14			
1949–50	Seattle	12–17			
1950–51	Seattle	32–5			NCIT Finalist
1951–52	Seattle	29–8			NIT First Round
1952–53	Seattle	29–4			NCAA Regional Third Place
1953–54	Seattle	26–2			NCAA first round
1954–55	Seattle	22–7			NCAA Regional Fourth Place
1955–56	Seattle	18–11			NCAA Regional Fourth Place
Seattle:		180–68 (.726)			
Total:		180–68 (.726)			

=== ABA ===
Legend
Regular season	G	Games coached	W	Games won	L	Games lost	W–L %	Win–loss %
Playoffs	PG	Playoff games	PW	Playoff wins	PL	Playoff losses	PW–L %	Playoff win–loss %

Team	Year	G	W	L	W–L%	Finish	PG	PW	PL	PW–L%	Result
ANA	1967–68	36	12	24	.333	5th in Western	-	-	-	-	Missed Playoffs
Career		36	12	24	.333		-	-	-	-	
