= Harold Kottman =

American basketball player and coach

Personal information
- Born: August 22, 1922 Forest Green, Missouri
- Died: November 30, 2004 (aged 82) Panama City, Florida
- Listed height: 6 ft 8 in (2.03 m)
- Listed weight: 220 lb (100 kg)

Career information
- High school: Glasgow (Glasgow, Missouri)
- College: Culver–Stockton
- Playing career: 1946–1948
- Position: Center
- Number: 9
- Coaching career: 1949–1956

Career history

Playing
- 1946–1947: Boston Celtics
- 1947–1948: St. Paul Saints
- 1948: Seattle Athletics

Coaching
- 1949–1956: Glasgow HS
- Stats at NBA.com
- Stats at Basketball Reference

Harold William Kottman (August 22, 1922 – November 30, 2004) was an American professional basketball player and coach.

A 6'8" center from Culver-Stockton College, Kottman played one season (1946–47) in the Basketball Association of America as a member of the Boston Celtics. He averaged 3.1 points in 53 games.

After his retirement from playing in 1948, Kottman returned to his home state of Missouri and coached the basketball team at Glasgow High School. He worked as a teacher in Centralia and Center, and became the superintendent of schools in Hale.

== BAA career statistics ==
Legend
GP	Games played
FG%	Field-goal percentage
FT%	Free-throw percentage
APG	Assists per game
PPG	Points per game

=== Regular season ===
Year	Team	GP	FG%	FT%	APG	PPG
1946–47	Boston	53	.314	.465	.3	3.1
Career		53	.314	.465	.3	3.1
