= Virgil Vaughn =

American basketball player

Personal information
- Born: May 15, 1918 Webster County, Kentucky, U.S.
- Died: February 26, 2007 (aged 88)
- Listed height: 6 ft 4 in (1.93 m)
- Listed weight: 205 lb (93 kg)

Career information
- College: Kentucky Wesleyan
- Playing career: 1946–1947
- Position: Power forward / center
- Number: 17

Career history
- 1945–1946: Baltimore Bullets
- 1946–1947: Boston Celtics
- 1947–1948: Syracuse Nationals
- Stats at NBA.com
- Stats at Basketball Reference

Virgil Vincent Vaughn (May 15, 1918 – February 26, 2007) was an American professional basketball player who spent one season in the Basketball Association of America (BAA) as a member of the Boston Celtics during the 1946–47 season. He attended Western Kentucky University.

== BAA career statistics ==
Legend
GP	Games played
FG%	Field-goal percentage
FT%	Free-throw percentage
APG	Assists per game
PPG	Points per game

=== Regular season ===
Year	Team	GP	FG%	FT%	APG	PPG
1946–47	Boston	17	.192	.536	.6	2.6
Career		17	.192	.536	.6	2.6
