= Warren Fenley =

American basketball player

Personal information
- Born: February 8, 1922 New York City, New York, U.S.
- Died: January 18, 2009 (aged 86)
- Listed height: 6 ft 3 in (1.91 m)
- Listed weight: 190 lb (86 kg)

Career information
- High school: Port Richmond (Staten Island, New York)
- College: Manhattan
- Playing career: 1944–1950
- Position: Forward
- Number: 7

Career history
- 1944–1945: New York Westchesters
- 1946: Brooklyn Gothams
- 1946–1947: Boston Celtics
- 1948: Brooklyn Gothams
- 1949–1950: Paterson Crescents
- Stats at NBA.com
- Stats at Basketball Reference

William Warren Fenley (February 8, 1922 – January 18, 2009) was an American professional basketball player. He spent one season in the Basketball Association of America (BAA) as a member of the Boston Celtics in the 1946–1947 season. Fenley attended Port Richmond High School on the North Shore of Staten Island and later Manhattan College. After his BAA career ended, he founded the school athletic program for his home parish of St. Rita's Church. Fenley became the first head coach for the Monsignor Farrell High School boys' basketball team in 1964, and the first for Moore Catholic High School in 1968. He was a former United States Marine and New York police sergeant.

== BAA career statistics ==
Legend
GP	Games played
FG%	Field-goal percentage
FT%	Free-throw percentage
APG	Assists per game
PPG	Points per game

=== Regular season ===
Year	Team	GP	FG%	FT%	APG	PPG
1946–47	Boston	33	.225	.511	.5	2.6
Career		33	.225	.511	.5	2.6
