= Dick Murphy (basketball) =

American basketball player (1921–1973)

Personal information
- Born: March 10, 1921 New York, U.S.
- Died: October 22, 1973 (aged 52)
- Listed height: 6 ft 1 in (1.85 m)
- Listed weight: 175 lb (79 kg)

Career information
- College: Manhattan (1940–1943)
- Position: Guard
- Number: 15, 11, 5

Career history
- 1946–1947: New York Knicks
- 1947: Boston Celtics
- 1947: Elizabeth Braves
- 1947–1950: Paterson Crescents

Career highlights
- 3× All-Metropolitan NY Conference (1941–1943)
- Stats at NBA.com
- Stats at Basketball Reference

Richard D. Murphy (March 10, 1921 – October 22, 1973) was an American professional basketball player. He played for the New York Knicks and Boston Celtics in the Basketball Association of America (BAA). For his career, Murphy averaged 1.1 points per game.

Murphy played college basketball for the Manhattan Jaspers and earned All-Metropolitan New York Conference honors for all three seasons he played. As team captain, he led the Jaspers to their first National Invitation Tournament (NIT) berth in 1943. Murphy was inducted into the Manhattan College Athletic Hall of Fame in 1982.

Between college and a stint in the NBA, Murphy served in WWII as a US Navy officer. Murphy followed in the footsteps of his older brother, Jack Murphy, who was a year ahead of him on the Manhattan College men's basketball team and as a WWII Navy officer.

== BAA career statistics ==
Legend
| GP | Games played | FG% | Field-goal percentage |
| FT% | Free-throw percentage | APG | Assists per game |
| PPG | Points per game | **Bold** | Career high |

=== Regular season ===
| Year | Team | GP | FG% | FT% | APG | PPG |
|---|---|---|---|---|---|---|
| 1946–47 | New York | **24** | **.241** | **.800** | .2 | **1.3** |
| 1946–47 | Boston | 7 | .059 | .000 | **.4** | .3 |
| Career | | 31 | .200 | .444 | .3 | 1.1 |
