= Wyndol Gray =

American basketball player (1922–1994)

Personal information
- Born: March 30, 1922 Hanceville, Alabama, U.S.
- Died: March 20, 1994 (aged 71)
- Listed height: 6 ft 1 in (1.85 m)
- Listed weight: 175 lb (79 kg)

Career information
- High school: South (Akron, Ohio)
- College: Bowling Green (1942–1945); Harvard (1945–1946)
- Playing career: 1946–1948
- Position: Shooting guard / small forward
- Number: 4, 3

Career history
- 1946–1947: Boston Celtics
- 1947: St. Louis Bombers
- 1948: Providence Steamrollers
- 1948: Toledo Jeeps

Career highlights
- Consensus first-team All-American (1945); Second-team All-American – SN (1946)

Career BAA statistics
- Points: 363
- Rebounds: Not tracked
- Assists: 50
- Stats at NBA.com
- Stats at Basketball Reference

Wyndol Woodrow Gray (March 30, 1922 – March 20, 1994) was an American professional basketball player. He was the brother of Cortez Gray, who was also a professional basketball player.

Gray played at Akron South High School in Akron, Ohio and went on to play collegiately at Bowling Green State University in 1942. At the time, freshmen were allowed to play to compensate for a shortage of college-age players due to World War II. Gray played on future Hall of Fame coach Harold Anderson's first team at Bowling Green. He led the team in scoring at 22.3 points per game and the Falcons went 18–4.

Gray joined the Navy after the season, and returned to Bowling Green for the 1944–45 season as a part of the V-12 Navy College Training Program and, along with big man Don Otten, led the Falcons to the final of the 1945 National Invitation Tournament, where they were defeated by the George Mikan-led DePaul Blue Demons. After the season, Gray was named a consensus first team All-American – Bowling Green's first in basketball.

In 1945–46, Gray played at Harvard. There he led the Crimson to their first NCAA tournament appearance and at the conclusion of the season he was named a second team All-American by the Sporting News magazine, giving him the unusual distinction of being named an All-American at two different universities.

After his college career was over, Gray played for Honey Russell on the first Boston Celtics team in 1946–47. He played in 55 of the team's 60 games and finished third on the team in scoring at 6.4 points per game. The following season, the Celtics traded Gray to the St. Louis Bombers for guard Cecil Hankins. Eleven games into his Bombers career, Gray was again traded, this time to the Providence Steamrollers for forward Ariel Maughan. Gray's Steamrollers career lasted only one game.

Gray, who is one of only four Harvard players to play in the NBA, died on March 20, 1994.

== BAA career statistics ==
Legend
GP	Games played	FG%	Field-goal percentage
FT%	Free-throw percentage	APG	Assists per game
PPG	Points per game	**Bold**	Career high

=== Regular season ===
Year	Team	GP	FG%	FT%	APG	PPG
1946–47	Boston	**55**	**.292**	**.581**	**.9**	**6.4**
1947–48	St. Louis	11	.167	.333	.3	1.2
1947–48	Providence	1	.000	.000	.0	.0
Career		67	.283	.570	.7	5.4
