= Harvard Crimson men's basketball =

Men's basketball team of Harvard University

2025–26 Harvard Crimson men's basketball team
- University: Harvard University
- Head coach: Tommy Amaker (18th season)
- Conference: Ivy League
- Location: Cambridge, Massachusetts
- Arena: Lavietes Pavilion (capacity: 1,636)
- Nickname: Crimson
- Colors: Crimson, white, and black

Uniforms
Home	Away

NCAA tournament Elite Eight
- 1946
Other NCAA tournament results
Appearances	1946, 2012, 2013, 2014, 2015

Conference regular-season champions
- 2011, 2012, 2013, 2014, 2015, 2018, 2019

The Harvard Crimson men's basketball program represents intercollegiate men's basketball at Harvard University. The team currently competes in the Ivy League in Division I of the National Collegiate Athletic Association (NCAA) and plays home games at the Lavietes Pavilion in Boston, Massachusetts. The Crimson are currently coached by Tommy Amaker.

== History ==
=== Tommy Amaker era ===
On April 11, 2007, Tommy Amaker was named men's basketball coach at Harvard University. On January 7, 2009, Amaker's Harvard squad defeated then-ranked Boston College (#17 AP Poll/#24 Coaches' Poll) for the first win over a ranked team in the program's history. The following season, after Amaker coached Harvard to its most successful season ever behind the play of Jeremy Lin, the 2009–10 team was invited to participate in the 2010 CollegeInsider.com Tournament. The team was defeated in the first round by Appalachian State.

Amaker led the 2010-11 team to a share of the 2010–11 Ivy League men's basketball season championship, which was school's first men's basketball Ivy League Championship since the league was formed during the 1956–57 season. Harvard finished the season a perfect 14–0 at home, which surpassed the prior season's school record of eleven home wins. The team's 12 conference game wins established a school record. The team's victory over Colorado was the team's first ever against a Big 12 Conference opponent since that conference commenced play in 1996. His fourth season also marked the fourth straight season that the team defeated at least one power conference opponent. By finishing as Ivy League Co-champion, they faced Princeton in a one-game playoff and lost by a score of 63–62. Harvard earned an automatic bid to the 2011 National Invitation Tournament, but was defeated by Oklahoma State by a 71–54 margin in the first round. The final record of 23–7 surpassed the prior season's total of 21 wins for the most in the history of the program.

The team appeared in the NCAA Division I men's basketball tournament in 2014, where Harvard upset 5-seed Cincinnati 61–57 before being eliminated in the round of 32 by 4-seed Michigan State by a score of 80–73. In 2015, Harvard tied with Yale for the Ivy title with an 11–3 league record. Despite having lost to Yale 62–52 at Lavietes Pavilion on March 6, 2015, just eight days later Harvard won a playoff between the two at the Palestra in Philadelphia to determine the Ivy League's NCAA automatic bid by a score of 53–51. Harvard thereby achieved its fourth straight NCAA tournament appearance while extending Yale's 53-year NCAA tournament appearance drought. Harvard was eliminated from the 2015 NCAA tournament by UNC by a score of 67–65 after leading with under one minute to play in the game.

Harvard stood at 10-4 in the Ivy league during the 2019-2020 season when the remainder of the season was cancelled due to the COVID-19 crisis. The entire 2020-2021 Ivy League men's basketball season was cancelled due to the continuing COVID-19 crisis.

At the conclusion of the 2021-2022 season, Amaker's record at Harvard stood at 264-152.

=== Financial aid and recruiting ===
Another key to Harvard's recent success in basketball has been a 2006 change in the school's financial aid policy. Although the Ivy League strictly prohibits athletic scholarships, Harvard has adopted an aid scheme that makes the school far more accessible to low- and middle-income students. Under current policy, all students (not just athletes) from families with annual incomes less than $180,000 pay at most 10% of family income, and those with family incomes under $60,000 receive full scholarships. According to Jay Hart of Yahoo! Sports,

With the financial barrier to entry lifted, an offer to play basketball at Harvard became instantly competitive with the rest of the world of collegiate athletics, where full-ride scholarships are (purportedly) the only currency.

== Roster ==
As of 30 Jan 2025

No.	Nat.	Player	Pos.	Height
3	USA	Xavier Nesbitt	G	5'11"
4	USA	Robert Hinton	G	6'5"
5	USA	Ben Eisendrath	G	6'2"
6	USA	Kenan Parrish	F	7'0"
7	USA	Austin Hunt	G	6'4"
8	USA	Tey Barbour	G	6'4"
11	USA	Evan Nelson	G	6'2"
12	USA	Dutch Dowdell	G	6'6"
13	USA	Chandler Piggé	G	6'5"
14	USA	Greg Cooper	G	6'0"
15	USA	Thomas Batties II	F	6'7"
17	SWE	Leo Byrne	F	6'8
23	FRA	Louis Lesmond	G	6'6
35	AUS	Luca Ace-Nasteski	F	6'10"

== Postseason results ==
=== NCAA tournament results ===
The Crimson have appeared in the NCAA Division I men's basketball tournament five times. Their combined record is 2–6. Until their appearance in the Tournament in 2012, they had gone 66 years without making an appearance, the longest drought in NCAA history.

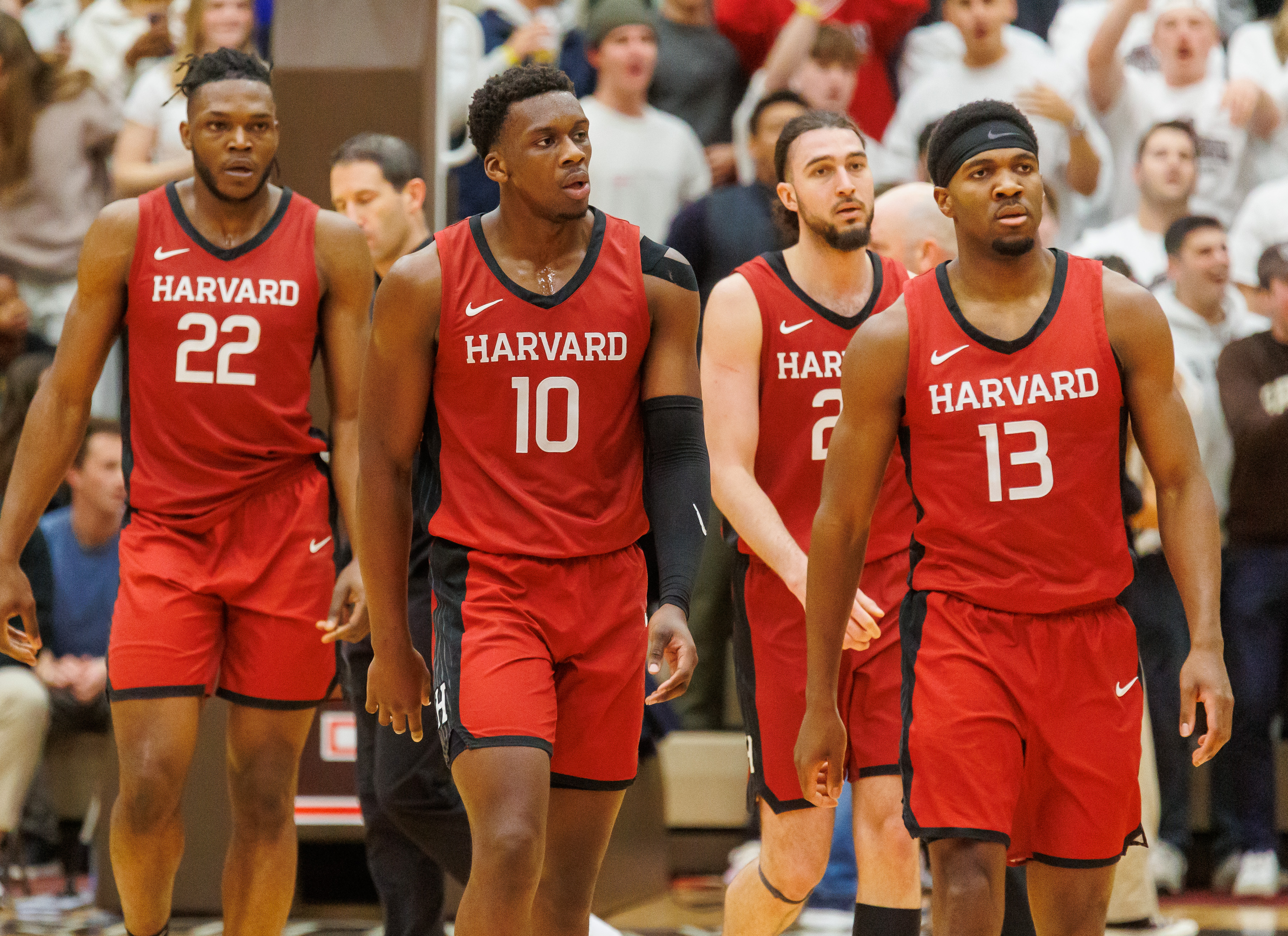
2023-24 team members: Justice Ajogbor, Chisom Okpara, Louis Lesmond, Chandler Piggé

Year	Seed	Round	Opponent	Result
1946		Elite Eight	Ohio State	L 38–46
1946		Regional 3rd Place	NYU	L 61–67
2012	12	Second round	Vanderbilt	L 70–79
2013	14	Second round	New Mexico	W 68–62
2013		Third round	Arizona	L 51–74
2014	12	Second round	Cincinnati	W 61–57
2014		Third round	Michigan State	L 73–80
2015	13	Second round	North Carolina	L 65–67

=== NIT results ===
The Crimson have appeared in the National Invitation Tournament three times. Their combined record is 1–3.

Year	Round	Opponent	Result
2011	First round	Oklahoma State	L 54–71
2018	First round	Marquette	L 60–67
2019	First round Second round	Georgetown; NC State	W 71–68; L 77–78

=== CIT results ===
The Crimson have appeared in the CollegeInsider.com Postseason Tournament once. Their record is 0–1.

Year	Round	Opponent	Result
2010	First round	Appalachian State	L 71–93

== Notable players ==
=== Crimson in the National Basketball Association ===
Bold denotes active player. (Note: A player is considered inactive if he has announced his retirement or not played for a full season.)

- Wyndol Gray
- Jeremy Lin
- Saul Mariaschin
- Ed Smith

=== Crimson in international leagues ===
- Lou Silver
