= Mel Hirsch =

American basketball player (1921–1968)

- Hirsch in 1945

Personal information
- Born: July 31, 1921 Brooklyn, New York, U.S.
- Died: December 1968 (aged 47)
- Listed height: 5 ft 6 in (1.68 m)
- Listed weight: 165 lb (75 kg)

Career information
- College: Brooklyn (1939–1943)
- Playing career: 1946–1947
- Position: Point guard
- Number: 3

Career history
- 1946–1947: Boston Celtics
- Stats at NBA.com
- Stats at Basketball Reference

Melvin M. Hirsch (July 31, 1921 – December 1968) was an American professional basketball player. He played for the Boston Celtics of the Basketball Association of America (BAA), which would later become the National Basketball Association (NBA), for 13 games in the 1946–47 season. At 5 feet 6 inches tall, he was the shortest player in NBA history until Muggsy Bogues 40 years later. He is the third shortest NBA player of all time, after Bogues and Earl Boykins.

A stand-out player at Brooklyn College, Hirsch graduated in 1943 and served in the US Army Air Corps as a Navigator on C-47 aircraft in the 13th Troop Carrier Squadron in the South Pacific. He played on the squadron's officer's basketball team.

Hirsch died in December 1968, aged 47, from leukemia.

== BAA career statistics ==
Legend
GP	Games played
FG%	Field-goal percentage
FT%	Free-throw percentage
APG	Assists per game
PPG	Points per game

=== Regular season ===
Year	Team	GP	FG%	FT%	APG	PPG
1946–47	Boston	13	.200	.500	.8	1.5
Career		13	.200	.500	.8	1.5
