= Bob Duffy (basketball, born 1922) =

American basketball player

Personal information
- Born: July 5, 1922 Columbus, Ohio, U.S.
- Died: June 11, 1978 (aged 55)
- Listed height: 6 ft 4 in (1.93 m)
- Listed weight: 175 lb (79 kg)

Career information
- High school: Saint Charles Prep (Columbus, Ohio)
- College: Tulane (1940–1943)
- Playing career: 1946–1947
- Position: Forward
- Number: 13, 17

Career history
- 1946–1947: Chicago Stags
- 1947: Boston Celtics

Career statistics
- Points: 19 (1.1 ppg)
- Stats at NBA.com
- Stats at Basketball Reference

Robert John Duffy (July 5, 1922 – June 11, 1978) was an American professional basketball player. He played in the Basketball Association of America during the league's inaugural 1946–47 season. He played high school basketball at Saint Charles Preparatory School in Columbus, Ohio, college basketball at Tulane, and in the BAA he split his season playing for the Chicago Stags and Boston Celtics.

As a senior at Tulane in 1942–43, he led the Southeastern Conference with a 16.6 points per game scoring average.

== BAA career statistics ==
Legend
GP	Games played	FG%	Field-goal percentage
FT%	Free-throw percentage	APG	Assists per game
PPG	Points per game	**Bold**	Career high

=== Regular season ===
Year	Team	GP	FG%	FT%	APG	PPG
1946–47	Chicago	**11**	.200	.333	.0	1.0
1946–47	Boston	6	**.286**	**1.000**	.0	**1.3**
Career		17	.219	.714	.0	1.1
