= John Simmons (baseball) =

American baseball and basketball player (1920-2008)

- Outfielder
- Born: June 6, 1920; Birmingham, Alabama, U.S.
- Died: August 1, 2008 (aged 88); Farmingdale, New York, U.S.
- Batted: Right Threw: Right

MLB debut
- April 22, 1949, for the Washington Senators

Last MLB appearance
- September 25, 1949, for the Washington Senators

MLB statistics
- Batting average: .215
- Home runs: 0
- Runs batted in: 5
- Stats at Baseball Reference

Teams
- Washington Senators (1949)

John Earl Simmons Jr. (June 6, 1920 – August 1, 2008) was an American professional baseball and basketball player. In baseball, he was an outfielder in Major League Baseball and played for the Washington Senators in 1949. In basketball, he played for the Boston Celtics (BAA), Troy Celtics (ABL), and Schenectady Packers (NYSPL). He was the brother of professional basketball player Connie Simmons, and his son John Jr. played in the Kansas City Royals' farm system in the early 1970s.

== BAA career statistics ==
Legend
GP	Games played
FG%	Field-goal percentage
FT%	Free-throw percentage
APG	Assists per game
PPG	Points per game

=== Regular season ===
Year	Team	GP	FG%	FT%	APG	PPG
1946–47	Boston	60	.280	.614	.5	5.3
Career		60	.280	.614	.5	5.3
