= Harold Crisler =

American football player (1923–1987)

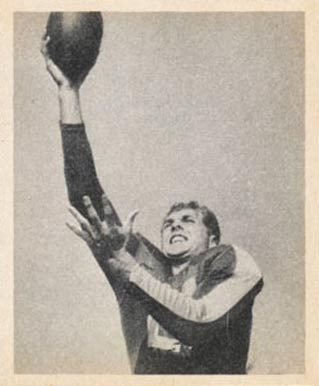
- Crisler on a 1948 Bowman football card

No. 55, 56
- Position: End

Personal information
- Born: December 31, 1923; Richmond, California
- Died: November 2, 1987 (aged 63)
- Listed height: 6 ft 3 in (1.91 m)
- Listed weight: 215 lb (98 kg)

Career information
- College: San José State; Iowa State

Career history
- 1946–1947: Boston Yanks
- 1948–1949: Washington Redskins
- 1950: Baltimore Colts
- Stats at Pro Football Reference

Harold James "Hal" Crisler (December 31, 1923 – November 2, 1987) was an American football end in the National Football League for the Boston Yanks, the Washington Redskins, and the Baltimore Colts. He attended San José State University and Iowa State University.

Crisler also played four games for the Boston Celtics of the Basketball Association of America during the 1946–47 season.

== BAA career statistics ==
Legend
GP	Games played
FG%	Field-goal percentage
FT%	Free-throw percentage
APG	Assists per game
PPG	Points per game

=== Regular season ===
Year	Team	GP	FG%	FT%	APG	PPG
1946–47	Boston	4	.333	1.000	.0	1.5
Career		4	.333	1.000	.0	1.5
