= List of St. Louis Bombers players =

The following is a list of players of the now-defunct St. Louis Bombers professional basketball team.

- John Abramovic
- Herschel Baltimore
- John Barr
- Aubrey Davis
- Bob Doll
- Lonnie Eggleston
- Wyndol Gray
- Coulby Gunther
- Cecil Hankins
- Fred Jacobs
- Grady Lewis
- Johnny Logan
- Ed Macauley
- Don Martin
- Ariel Maughan
- Mike McCarron
- Bill Miller
- George Munroe
- Bob O'Brien
- Dermie O'Connell
- Buddy O'Grady
- Johnny Orr
- Mac Otten
- Easy Parham
- Don Putman
- Bill Roberts
- Red Rocha
- Irv Rothenberg
- Giff Roux
- Otto Schnellbacher
- Ralph Siewert
- Belus Smawley
- Deb Smith
- Mike Todorovich
- D. C. Wilcutt
