= List of 1948–49 BAA season transactions =

This is a list of all personnel changes for the 1948 BAA off-season and 1948–49 BAA season.

== Events ==
=== August 30, 1948 ===
- The Boston Celtics sold Mike Bloom to the Minneapolis Lakers.

=== October ?, 1948 ===
- The Chicago Stags sold Jim Seminoff to the Boston Celtics.

=== October 13, 1948 ===
- The New York Knicks sold Stan Stutz to the Boston Celtics.

=== October 25, 1948 ===
- The St. Louis Bombers sold Irv Rothenberg to the New York Knicks.

=== November 18, 1948 ===
- The Philadelphia Warriors signed Elmore Morgenthaler as a free agent.

=== November 19, 1948 ===
- The Boston Celtics signed Bob Doll as a free agent.
- The Baltimore Bullets traded John Mahnken to the Indianapolis Jets for Freddie Lewis and Hal Tidrick.

=== November 20, 1948 ===
- The Chicago Stags sold Bill Roberts to the Boston Celtics.

=== December ?, 1948 ===
- The Minneapolis Lakers released Mike Bloom.

=== December 1, 1948 ===
- The Philadelphia Warriors sold Roy Pugh to the Fort Wayne Pistons.

=== December 2, 1948 ===
- The Baltimore Bullets claimed Johnny Ezersky on waivers from the Providence Steam Rollers.

=== December 15, 1948 ===
- The Philadelphia Warriors sold Bob O'Brien to the St. Louis Bombers.

=== December 19, 1948 ===
- The Indianapolis Jets traded Bruce Hale and John Mahnken to the Fort Wayne Pistons for Ralph Hamilton, Walt Kirk and Blackie Towery.

=== December 21, 1948 ===
- The Rochester Royals sold Lionel Malamed to the Indianapolis Jets.

=== December 28, 1948 ===
- The Washington Capitols waived Jack Toomay.

=== January ?, 1949 ===
- The St. Louis Bombers sold Giff Roux to the Providence Steam Rollers.
- The Baltimore Bullets signed Jack Toomay as a free agent.
- The Providence Steam Rollers released Earl Shannon.

=== January 2, 1949 ===
- Red Auerbach resigns as Head Coach for Washington Capitols.

=== January 16, 1949 ===
- The Boston Celtics traded Chick Halbert and Mel Riebe to the Providence Steam Rollers for George Nostrand.

=== January 21, 1949 ===
- The Boston Celtics signed Earl Shannon as a free agent.

=== January 26, 1949 ===
- The Indianapolis Jets traded Ray Lumpp to the New York Knicks for Tommy Byrnes and cash.

=== January 27, 1949 ===
- The Philadelphia Warriors sold Phil Farbman to the Boston Celtics.

=== January 28, 1949 ===
- The Chicago Stags signed Mike Bloom as a free agent.

=== January 30, 1949 ===
- The Fort Wayne Pistons sold Bob Kinney to the Boston Celtics.

=== February ?, 1949 ===
- The Boston Celtics claimed Johnny Ezersky on waivers from the Baltimore Bullets.

=== February 3, 1949 ===
- The Indianapolis Jets traded Charlie Black to the Fort Wayne Pistons for Leo Mogus and cash.

=== February 4, 1949 ===
- The Chicago Stags signed Carl Meinhold as a free agent.
- The Chicago Stags sold Bill Miller to the St. Louis Bombers.

=== February 5, 1949 ===
- The Baltimore Bullets sold Irv Torgoff to the Philadelphia Warriors.

=== February 7, 1949 ===
- The Chicago Stags sold Whitey Kachan to the Minneapolis Lakers.
- The Providence Steam Rollers traded Otto Schnellbacher to the St. Louis Bombers for Buddy O'Grady.

=== February 11, 1949 ===
- The St. Louis Bombers released Don Martin.
- The Baltimore Bullets signed Don Martin as a free agent.
- The New York Knicks traded Sid Tanenbaum to the Baltimore Bullets for Connie Simmons. Simmons was sent as the player to be named later in July 1949.

=== May ?, 1949 ===
- The Indianapolis Jets sold Tommy Byrnes to the New York Knicks.

=== June 22, 1949 ===
- The Boston Celtics sold Gene Stump to the Minneapolis Lakers.

== Notes ==
- ^{a} Number of years played in the BAA prior to the draft
- ^{b} Career with the franchise that drafted the player
- ^{c} Never played a game for the franchise
