= List of NBA game sevens =

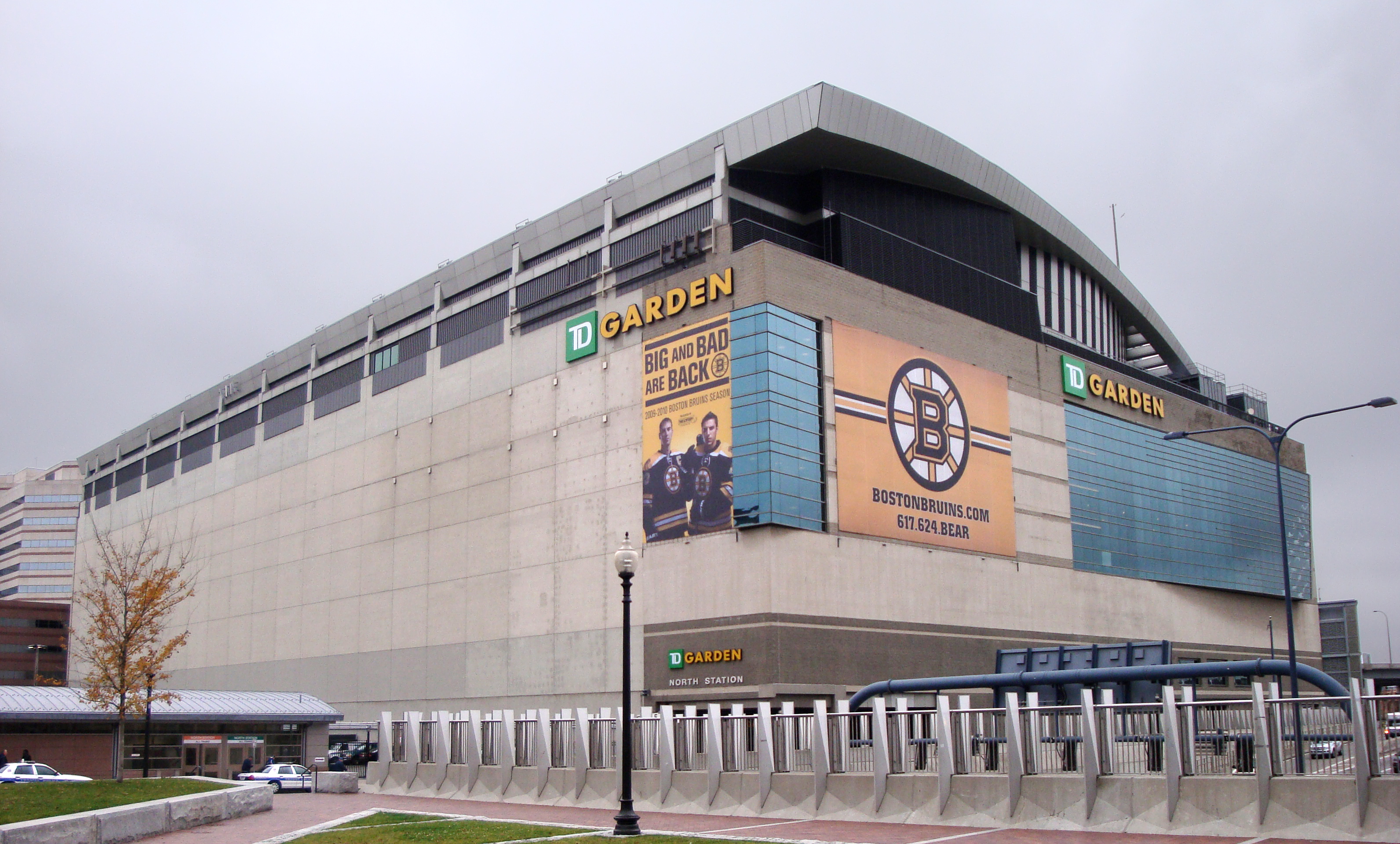
Since its opening in 1995, twelve game sevens have been played at the TD Garden, formerly known as FleetCenter and TD Banknorth Garden.

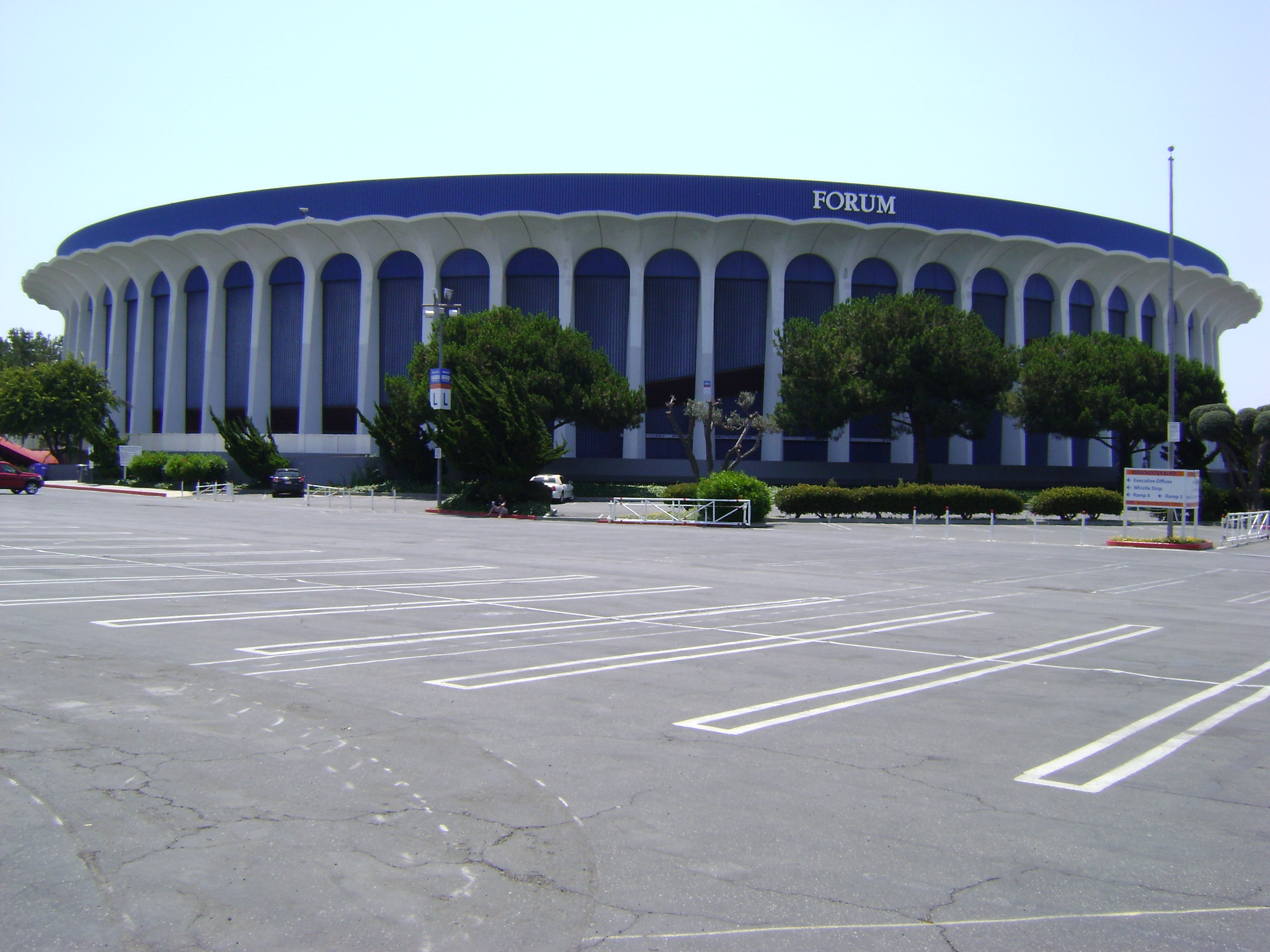
The Forum in Inglewood, California hosted eight game sevens when it was the home of the Los Angeles Lakers.

In the National Basketball Association (NBA), a game seven is the final game of a best-of-seven series in the NBA playoffs. Based on the playoffs format arrangement,^{[a]} it is played in the venue of the team holding home-court advantage for the series. The necessity of a game seven is not known until the outcome of game six is determined, assuming that a series reaches that far. In other words, game seven is the only one in a series that is not guaranteed more than one game in advance. Due to the decisive nature of game sevens, they are often "played more conservatively" and receive more media and fan attention.

The NBA Finals has always employed a best-of-seven series format. The Conference (or Division) Finals have used this format since 1958; the Conference or Division semifinals since 1968; and the First Round since 2003. During the 1947 and 1948 playoffs, in which teams from different divisions met each other in the opening rounds, the first-place teams from each division played a best-of-seven series against each other before one advanced to the league finals. The other teams in the playoffs competed against each other in three best-of-three series to determine the other spot in the finals.

Since the inception of the NBA, 160 game sevens have been played. Of those, only six went into overtime, and one into double overtime. 43 game sevens have been won by the road team. Every active NBA franchise has played in at least one game seven. There have been thirteen NBA playoff seasons in which no game seven was played: 1947, 1949, 1950, 1953, 1956, 1958, 1967, 1972, 1983, 1985, 1989, 1991, and 1999. All 13 of these NBA seasons with no game sevens occurred prior to the first round expanding from best of 5 to best of 7 in 2003, which increased the number of series that could go to 7 games from 7 series to 15 series. The 1994, 2014, 2016, and 2026 postseasons hold the record for most game sevens played, with five. In 1979, 1981, 1988, 2005, 2006, 2009, 2012, 2018, 2020, and 2025, four game sevens were played. The Los Angeles Lakers and New York Knicks both hold the record for most game sevens played in a single postseason, having played three game sevens in 1988 and 1994, respectively, the maximum possible at that time.

== Key ==
OT	Overtime (the number in front indicates the number of overtime periods played, if there were more than one)
*	Indicates a game seven that was won by the road team
Year (X)	Indicates the number of game sevens played in that year's postseason Each year is linked to an article about that particular NBA season
∞	Indicates a game seven that was hosted at a neutral site
§	Indicates the team that lost a game seven after coming back from an 0–3 series deficit
Team (#)	Indicates team and the number of game sevens played by that team at that point
^	Indicates game seven in the NBA Finals

== All-time game sevens ==
Year	Playoff round	Date	Venue	Winner	Result	Loser	Ref.
1948	Semifinals	April 6, 1948	St. Louis Arena	Philadelphia Warriors (1)	85–46*	St. Louis Bombers (1)	
1951	Finals	April 21, 1951	Edgerton Park Arena	Rochester Royals (1)	79–75^	New York Knicks (1) §	
1952	Finals	April 25, 1952	Minneapolis Auditorium	Minneapolis Lakers (1)	82–65^	New York Knicks (2)	
1954	Finals	April 12, 1954	Minneapolis Auditorium	Minneapolis Lakers (2)	87–80^	Syracuse Nationals (1)	
1955	Finals	April 10, 1955	Onondaga War Memorial	Syracuse Nationals (2)	92–91^	Fort Wayne Pistons (1)	
1957	Finals	April 13, 1957	Boston Garden	Boston Celtics (1)	125–123 (2OT)^	St. Louis Hawks (1)	
1959	Division finals	April 1, 1959	Boston Garden	Boston Celtics (2)	130–125	Syracuse Nationals (3)	
1960	Division finals	March 26, 1960	Kiel Auditorium	St. Louis Hawks (2)	97–86	Minneapolis Lakers (3)	
1960	Finals	April 9, 1960	Boston Garden	Boston Celtics (3)	122–103^	St. Louis Hawks (3)	
1961	Division finals	April 1, 1961	Kiel Auditorium	St. Louis Hawks (4)	105–103	Los Angeles Lakers (4)	
1962	Division finals	April 5, 1962	Boston Garden	Boston Celtics (4)	109–107	Philadelphia Warriors (2)	
1962	Finals	April 18, 1962	Boston Garden	Boston Celtics (5)	110–107 (OT)^	Los Angeles Lakers (5)	
1963	Division finals	April 10, 1963	Boston Garden	Boston Celtics (6)	142–131	Cincinnati Royals (2)	
1963	Division finals	April 11, 1963	Los Angeles Memorial Sports Arena	Los Angeles Lakers (6)	115–100	St. Louis Hawks (5)	
1964	Division finals	April 16, 1964	Cow Palace	San Francisco Warriors (3)	105–95	St. Louis Hawks (6)	
1965	Division finals	April 15, 1965	Boston Garden	Boston Celtics (7)	110–109	Philadelphia 76ers (4)	
1966	Division finals	April 15, 1966	Los Angeles Memorial Sports Arena	Los Angeles Lakers (7)	130–121	St. Louis Hawks (7)	
1966	Finals	April 28, 1966	Boston Garden	Boston Celtics (8)	95–93^	Los Angeles Lakers (8)	
1968	Division finals	April 19, 1968	The Spectrum	Boston Celtics (9)	100–96*	Philadelphia 76ers (5)	
1969	Finals	May 5, 1969	The Forum	Boston Celtics (10)	108–106*^	Los Angeles Lakers (9)	
1970	Division semifinals	April 6, 1970	Madison Square Garden	New York Knicks (3)	127–114	Baltimore Bullets (1)	
1970	Division semifinals	April 9, 1970	The Forum	Los Angeles Lakers (10)	129–94	Phoenix Suns (1)	
1970	Finals	May 8, 1970	Madison Square Garden	New York Knicks (4)	113–99^	Los Angeles Lakers (11)	
1971	Conference semifinals	April 4, 1971	Baltimore Civic Center	Baltimore Bullets (2)	128–120	Philadelphia 76ers (6)	
1971	Conference semifinals	April 6, 1971	The Forum	Los Angeles Lakers (12)	109–98	Chicago Bulls (1)	
1971	Conference finals	April 19, 1971	Madison Square Garden	Baltimore Bullets (3)	93–91*	New York Knicks (5)	
1973	Conference semifinals	April 15, 1973	The Forum	Los Angeles Lakers (13)	95–92	Chicago Bulls (2)	
1973	Conference finals	April 29, 1973	Boston Garden	New York Knicks (6)	94–78*	Boston Celtics (11)	
1974	Conference semifinals	April 12, 1974	Madison Square Garden	New York Knicks (7)	91–81	Capital Bullets (4)	
1974	Conference semifinals	April 13, 1974	Chicago Stadium	Chicago Bulls (3)	96–94	Detroit Pistons (2)	
1974	Finals	May 12, 1974	Milwaukee Arena	Boston Celtics (12)	102–87*^	Milwaukee Bucks (1)	
1975	Conference semifinals	April 25, 1975	Capital Centre	Washington Bullets (5)	115–96	Buffalo Braves (1)	
1975	Conference finals	May 14, 1975	Oakland–Alameda County Coliseum Arena	Golden State Warriors (4)	83–79	Chicago Bulls (4)	
1976	Conference semifinals	April 29, 1976	Coliseum at Richfield	Cleveland Cavaliers (1)	87–85	Washington Bullets (6)	
1976	Conference finals	May 16, 1976	Oakland–Alameda County Coliseum Arena	Phoenix Suns (2)	94–86*	Golden State Warriors (5)	
1977	Conference semifinals	May 1, 1977	The Spectrum	Philadelphia 76ers (7)	83–77	Boston Celtics (13)	
1977	Conference semifinals	May 4, 1977	The Forum	Los Angeles Lakers (14)	97–84	Golden State Warriors (6)	
1978	Conference semifinals	May 3, 1978	McNichols Sports Arena	Denver Nuggets (1)	116–110	Milwaukee Bucks (2)	
1978	Finals	June 7, 1978	Seattle Center Coliseum	Washington Bullets (7)	105–99*^	Seattle SuperSonics (1)	
1979	Conference semifinals	April 29, 1979	Capital Centre	Washington Bullets (8)	100–94	Atlanta Hawks (8)	
1979	Conference semifinals	May 2, 1979	HemisFair Arena	San Antonio Spurs (1)	111–108	Philadelphia 76ers (8)	
1979	Conference finals	May 17, 1979	King County Domed Stadium	Seattle SuperSonics (2)	114–110	Phoenix Suns (3)	
1979	Conference finals	May 18, 1979	Capital Centre	Washington Bullets (9)	107–105	San Antonio Spurs (2)	
1980	Conference semifinals	April 20, 1980	King County Domed Stadium	Seattle SuperSonics (3)	98–94	Milwaukee Bucks (3)	
1981	Conference semifinals	April 17, 1981	HemisFair Arena	Houston Rockets (1)	105–100*	San Antonio Spurs (3)	
1981	Conference semifinals	April 19, 1981	The Spectrum	Philadelphia 76ers (9)	99–98	Milwaukee Bucks (4)	
1981	Conference semifinals	April 19, 1981	Arizona Veterans Memorial Coliseum	Kansas City Kings (3)	95–88*	Phoenix Suns (4)	
1981	Conference finals	May 3, 1981	Boston Garden	Boston Celtics (14)	91–90	Philadelphia 76ers (10)	
1982	Conference finals	May 23, 1982	Boston Garden	Philadelphia 76ers (11)	120–106*	Boston Celtics (15)	
1984	Conference semifinals	May 13, 1984	Boston Garden	Boston Celtics (16)	121–104	New York Knicks (8)	
1984	Finals	June 12, 1984	Boston Garden	Boston Celtics (17)	111–102^	Los Angeles Lakers (15)	
1986	Conference semifinals	May 11, 1986	MECCA Arena	Milwaukee Bucks (5)	113–112	Philadelphia 76ers (12)	
1987	Conference semifinals	May 17, 1987	Boston Garden	Boston Celtics (18)	119–113	Milwaukee Bucks (6)	
1987	Conference finals	May 30, 1987	Boston Garden	Boston Celtics (19)	117–114	Detroit Pistons (3)	
1988	Conference semifinals	May 21, 1988	The Forum	Los Angeles Lakers (16)	109–98	Utah Jazz (1)	
1988	Conference semifinals	May 22, 1988	Boston Garden	Boston Celtics (20)	118–116	Atlanta Hawks (9)	
1988	Conference finals	June 4, 1988	The Forum	Los Angeles Lakers (17)	117–102	Dallas Mavericks (1)	
1988	Finals	June 21, 1988	The Forum	Los Angeles Lakers (18)	108–105^	Detroit Pistons (4)	
1990	Conference semifinals	May 19, 1990	Memorial Coliseum	Portland Trail Blazers (1)	108–105 (OT)	San Antonio Spurs (4)	
1990	Conference finals	June 3, 1990	The Palace of Auburn Hills	Detroit Pistons (5)	93–74	Chicago Bulls (5)	
1992	Conference semifinals	May 17, 1992	Chicago Stadium	Chicago Bulls (6)	110–81	New York Knicks (9)	
1992	Conference semifinals	May 17, 1992	Coliseum at Richfield	Cleveland Cavaliers (2)	122–104	Boston Celtics (21)	
1993	Conference semifinals	May 22, 1993	Seattle Center Coliseum	Seattle SuperSonics (4)	103–100 (OT)	Houston Rockets (2)	
1993	Conference finals	June 5, 1993	America West Arena	Phoenix Suns (5)	123–110	Seattle SuperSonics (5)	
1994	Conference semifinals	May 21, 1994	The Summit	Houston Rockets (3)	104–94	Phoenix Suns (6)	
1994	Conference semifinals	May 21, 1994	Delta Center	Utah Jazz (2)	91–81	Denver Nuggets (2) §	
1994	Conference semifinals	May 22, 1994	Madison Square Garden	New York Knicks (10)	87–77	Chicago Bulls (7)	
1994	Conference finals	June 5, 1994	Madison Square Garden	New York Knicks (11)	94–90	Indiana Pacers (1)	
1994	Finals	June 22, 1994	The Summit	Houston Rockets (4)	90–84^	New York Knicks (12)	
1995	Conference semifinals	May 20, 1995	America West Arena	Houston Rockets (5)	115–114*	Phoenix Suns (7)	
1995	Conference semifinals	May 21, 1995	Madison Square Garden	Indiana Pacers (2)	97–95*	New York Knicks (13)	
1995	Conference finals	June 4, 1995	Orlando Arena	Orlando Magic (1)	105–81	Indiana Pacers (3)	
1996	Conference finals	June 2, 1996	KeyArena at Seattle Center	Seattle SuperSonics (6)	90–86	Utah Jazz (3)	
1997	Conference semifinals	May 17, 1997	The Summit	Houston Rockets (6)	96–91	Seattle SuperSonics (7)	
1997	Conference semifinals	May 18, 1997	Miami Arena	Miami Heat (1)	101–90	New York Knicks (14)	
1998	Conference finals	May 31, 1998	United Center	Chicago Bulls (8)	88–83	Indiana Pacers (4)	
2000	Conference semifinals	May 21, 2000	American Airlines Arena	New York Knicks (15)	83–82*	Miami Heat (2)	
2000	Conference finals	June 4, 2000	Staples Center	Los Angeles Lakers (19)	89–84	Portland Trail Blazers (2)	
2001	Conference semifinals	May 20, 2001	First Union Center	Philadelphia 76ers (13)	88–87	Toronto Raptors (1)	
2001	Conference semifinals	May 20, 2001	Bradley Center	Milwaukee Bucks (7)	104–95	Charlotte Hornets (1)	
2001	Conference finals	June 3, 2001	First Union Center	Philadelphia 76ers (14)	108–91	Milwaukee Bucks (8)	
2002	Conference finals	June 2, 2002	ARCO Arena	Los Angeles Lakers (20)	112–106 (OT)*	Sacramento Kings (4)	
2003	First round	May 4, 2003	American Airlines Center	Dallas Mavericks (2)	107–95	Portland Trail Blazers (3) §	
2003	First round	May 4, 2003	The Palace of Auburn Hills	Detroit Pistons (6)	108–93	Orlando Magic (2)	
2003	Conference semifinals	May 17, 2003	American Airlines Center	Dallas Mavericks (3)	112–99	Sacramento Kings (5)	
2004	First round	May 4, 2004	American Airlines Arena	Miami Heat (3)	85–77	New Orleans Hornets (1)	
2004	Conference semifinals	May 19, 2004	Target Center	Minnesota Timberwolves (1)	83–80	Sacramento Kings (6)	
2004	Conference semifinals	May 20, 2004	The Palace of Auburn Hills	Detroit Pistons (7)	90–69	New Jersey Nets (1)	
2005	First round	May 7, 2005	FleetCenter	Indiana Pacers (5)	97–70*	Boston Celtics (22)	
2005	First round	May 7, 2005	American Airlines Center	Dallas Mavericks (4)	116–76	Houston Rockets (7)	
2005	Conference finals	June 6, 2005	American Airlines Arena	Detroit Pistons (8)	88–82*	Miami Heat (4)	
2005	Finals	June 23, 2005	SBC Center	San Antonio Spurs (5)	81–74^	Detroit Pistons (9)	
2006	First round	May 6, 2006	US Airways Center	Phoenix Suns (8)	121–90	Los Angeles Lakers (21)	
2006	Conference semifinals	May 21, 2006	The Palace of Auburn Hills	Detroit Pistons (10)	79–61	Cleveland Cavaliers (3)	
2006	Conference semifinals	May 22, 2006	AT&T Center	Dallas Mavericks (5)	119–111 (OT)*	San Antonio Spurs (6)	
2006	Conference semifinals	May 22, 2006	US Airways Center	Phoenix Suns (9)	127–107	Los Angeles Clippers (2)	
2007	First round	May 5, 2007	Toyota Center	Utah Jazz (4)	103–99*	Houston Rockets (8)	
2008	First round	May 4, 2008	TD Banknorth Garden	Boston Celtics (23)	99–65	Atlanta Hawks (10)	
2008	Conference semifinals	May 18, 2008	TD Banknorth Garden	Boston Celtics (24)	97–92	Cleveland Cavaliers (4)	
2008	Conference semifinals	May 19, 2008	New Orleans Arena	San Antonio Spurs (7)	91–82*	New Orleans Hornets (2)	
2009	First round	May 2, 2009	TD Banknorth Garden	Boston Celtics (25)	109–99	Chicago Bulls (9)	
2009	First round	May 3, 2009	Philips Arena	Atlanta Hawks (11)	91–78	Miami Heat (5)	
2009	Conference semifinals	May 17, 2009	Staples Center	Los Angeles Lakers (22)	89–70	Houston Rockets (9)	
2009	Conference semifinals	May 17, 2009	TD Banknorth Garden	Orlando Magic (3)	101–82*	Boston Celtics (26)	
2010	First round	May 2, 2010	Philips Arena	Atlanta Hawks (12)	95–74	Milwaukee Bucks (9)	
2010	Finals	June 17, 2010	Staples Center	Los Angeles Lakers (23)	83–79^	Boston Celtics (27)	
2011	Conference semifinals	May 15, 2011	Oklahoma City Arena	Oklahoma City Thunder (8)	105–90	Memphis Grizzlies (1)	
2012	First round	May 12, 2012	Staples Center	Los Angeles Lakers (24)	96–87	Denver Nuggets (3)	
2012	First round	May 13, 2012	FedExForum	Los Angeles Clippers (3)	82–72*	Memphis Grizzlies (2)	
2012	Conference semifinals	May 26, 2012	TD Garden	Boston Celtics (28)	85–75	Philadelphia 76ers (15)	
2012	Conference finals	June 9, 2012	American Airlines Arena	Miami Heat (6)	101–88	Boston Celtics (29)	
2013	First round	May 4, 2013	Barclays Center	Chicago Bulls (10)	99–93*	Brooklyn Nets (2)	
2013	Conference finals	June 3, 2013	American Airlines Arena	Miami Heat (7)	99–76	Indiana Pacers (6)	
2013	Finals	June 20, 2013	American Airlines Arena	Miami Heat (8)	95–88^	San Antonio Spurs (8)	
2014	First round	May 3, 2014	Bankers Life Fieldhouse	Indiana Pacers (7)	92–80	Atlanta Hawks (13)	
2014	First round	May 3, 2014	Chesapeake Energy Arena	Oklahoma City Thunder (9)	120–109	Memphis Grizzlies (3)	
2014	First round	May 3, 2014	Staples Center	Los Angeles Clippers (4)	126–121	Golden State Warriors (7)	
2014	First round	May 4, 2014	Air Canada Centre	Brooklyn Nets (3)	104–103*	Toronto Raptors (2)	
2014	First round	May 4, 2014	AT&T Center	San Antonio Spurs (9)	119–96	Dallas Mavericks (6)	
2015	First round	May 2, 2015	Staples Center	Los Angeles Clippers (5)	111–109	San Antonio Spurs (10)	
2015	Conference semifinals	May 17, 2015	Toyota Center	Houston Rockets (10)	113–100	Los Angeles Clippers (6)	
2016	First round	May 1, 2016	American Airlines Arena	Miami Heat (9)	106–73	Charlotte Hornets (2)	
2016	First round	May 1, 2016	Air Canada Centre	Toronto Raptors (3)	89–84	Indiana Pacers (8)	
2016	Conference semifinals	May 15, 2016	Air Canada Centre	Toronto Raptors (4)	116–89	Miami Heat (10)	
2016	Conference finals	May 30, 2016	Oracle Arena	Golden State Warriors (8)	96–88	Oklahoma City Thunder (10)	
2016	Finals	June 19, 2016	Oracle Arena	Cleveland Cavaliers (5)	93–89*^	Golden State Warriors (9)	
2017	First round	April 30, 2017	Staples Center	Utah Jazz (5)	104–91*	Los Angeles Clippers (7)	
2017	Conference semifinals	May 15, 2017	TD Garden	Boston Celtics (30)	115–105	Washington Wizards (10)	
2018	First round	April 28, 2018	TD Garden	Boston Celtics (31)	112–96	Milwaukee Bucks (10)	
2018	First round	April 29, 2018	Quicken Loans Arena	Cleveland Cavaliers (6)	105–101	Indiana Pacers (9)	
2018	Conference finals	May 27, 2018	TD Garden	Cleveland Cavaliers (7)	87–79*	Boston Celtics (32)	
2018	Conference finals	May 28, 2018	Toyota Center	Golden State Warriors (10)	101–92*	Houston Rockets (11)	
2019	First round	April 27, 2019	Pepsi Center	Denver Nuggets (4)	90–86	San Antonio Spurs (11)	
2019	Conference semifinals	May 12, 2019	Pepsi Center	Portland Trail Blazers (4)	100–96*	Denver Nuggets (5)	
2019	Conference semifinals	May 12, 2019	Scotiabank Arena	Toronto Raptors (5)	92–90	Philadelphia 76ers (16)	
2020	First round	September 1, 2020	ESPN Wide World of Sports Complex∞	Denver Nuggets (6)	80–78	Utah Jazz (6)	
2020	First round	September 2, 2020	ESPN Wide World of Sports Complex∞	Houston Rockets (12)	104–102	Oklahoma City Thunder (11)	
2020	Conference semifinals	September 11, 2020	ESPN Wide World of Sports Complex∞	Boston Celtics (33)^{[b]}	92–87*	Toronto Raptors (6)	
2020	Conference semifinals	September 15, 2020	ESPN Wide World of Sports Complex∞	Denver Nuggets (7)^{[b]}	104–89*	Los Angeles Clippers (8)	
2021	First round	June 6, 2021	Staples Center	Los Angeles Clippers (9)	126–111	Dallas Mavericks (7)	
2021	Conference semifinals	June 19, 2021	Barclays Center	Milwaukee Bucks (11)	115–111 (OT)*	Brooklyn Nets (4)	
2021	Conference semifinals	June 20, 2021	Wells Fargo Center	Atlanta Hawks (14)	103–96*	Philadelphia 76ers (17)	
2022	Conference semifinals	May 15, 2022	TD Garden	Boston Celtics (34)	109–81	Milwaukee Bucks (12)	
2022	Conference semifinals	May 15, 2022	Footprint Center	Dallas Mavericks (8)	123–90*	Phoenix Suns (10)	
2022	Conference finals	May 29, 2022	FTX Arena	Boston Celtics (35)	100–96*	Miami Heat (11)	
2023	First round	April 30, 2023	Golden 1 Center	Golden State Warriors (11)	120–100*	Sacramento Kings (7)	
2023	Conference semifinals	May 14, 2023	TD Garden	Boston Celtics (36)	112–88	Philadelphia 76ers (18)	
2023	Conference finals	May 29, 2023	TD Garden	Miami Heat (12)	103–84*	Boston Celtics (37) §	
2024	First round	May 5, 2024	Rocket Mortgage FieldHouse	Cleveland Cavaliers (8)	106–94	Orlando Magic (4)	
2024	Conference semifinals	May 19, 2024	Madison Square Garden	Indiana Pacers (10)	130–109*	New York Knicks (16)	
2024	Conference semifinals	May 19, 2024	Ball Arena	Minnesota Timberwolves (2)	98–90*	Denver Nuggets (8)	
2025	First round	May 3, 2025	Ball Arena	Denver Nuggets (9)	120–101	Los Angeles Clippers (10)	
2025	First round	May 4, 2025	Toyota Center	Golden State Warriors (12)	103–89*	Houston Rockets (13)	
2025	Conference semifinals	May 18, 2025	Paycom Center	Oklahoma City Thunder (12)	125–93	Denver Nuggets (10)	
2025	Finals	June 22, 2025	Paycom Center	Oklahoma City Thunder (13)	103–91^	Indiana Pacers (11)	
2026	First round	May 2, 2026	TD Garden	Philadelphia 76ers (19)	109–100*	Boston Celtics (38)	
2026	First round	May 3, 2026	Little Caesars Arena	Detroit Pistons (11)	116–94	Orlando Magic (5)	
2026	First round	May 3, 2026	Rocket Arena	Cleveland Cavaliers (9)	114–102	Toronto Raptors (7)	
2026	Conference semifinals	May 17, 2026	Little Caesars Arena	Cleveland Cavaliers (10)	125–94*	Detroit Pistons (12)	
2026	Conference finals	May 30, 2026	Paycom Center	San Antonio Spurs (12)	111–103*	Oklahoma City Thunder (14)	

== All-time standings ==
Team	Games played	Wins	Losses	Win–loss %
Boston Celtics	38	27	11	.711
Minneapolis/Los Angeles Lakers	24	16	8	.667
Syracuse Nationals/Philadelphia 76ers	19	7	12	.368
New York Knicks	16	7	9	.438
Seattle SuperSonics/Oklahoma City Thunder	14	8	6	.571
Tri-Cities Blackhawks/ Milwaukee/St. Louis/Atlanta Hawks	14	5	9	.357
San Diego/Houston Rockets	13	7	6	.538
Philadelphia/San Francisco/Golden State Warriors	12	7	5	.583
Miami Heat	12	7	5	.583
Fort Wayne/Detroit Pistons	12	6	6	.500
San Antonio Spurs	12	5	7	.417
Indiana Pacers	11	4	7	.364
Milwaukee Bucks	12	3	9	.250
Cleveland Cavaliers	10	8	2	.800
Chicago Packers/Zephyrs, Baltimore/Capital/Washington Bullets/Washington Wizards	10	6	4	.600
Denver Rockets/Nuggets	10	5	5	.500
Chicago Bulls	10	4	6	.400
Buffalo Braves/San Diego/Los Angeles Clippers	10	4	6	.400
Phoenix Suns	10	4	6	.400
Dallas Mavericks	8	5	3	.625
Toronto Raptors	7	3	4	.429
Rochester/Cincinnati Royals/Kansas City-Omaha/Kansas City/Sacramento Kings	7	2	5	.286
Utah Jazz	6	3	3	.500
Orlando Magic	5	2	3	.400
Portland Trail Blazers	4	2	2	.500
New York/New Jersey/Brooklyn Nets	4	1	3	.250
Memphis Grizzlies	3	0	3	.000
Minnesota Timberwolves	2	2	0	1.000
Charlotte Bobcats/Hornets	2	0	2	.000
New Orleans Hornets/Pelicans	2	0	2	.000
St. Louis Bombers (defunct)	1	0	1	.000

Note: Teams that have never played a game seven are excluded. Every active NBA franchise has played at least one Game 7. Franchise names prior to joining NBA are not shown.

== Reoccurring game seven matchups ==
(*) – Number of overtime periods played in the seventh game.

Count	Matchup	Record	Years Played
9	Boston Celtics vs. Philadelphia 76ers/Syracuse Nationals	Celtics, 6–3	1959, 1965, 1968, 1977, 1981, 1982, 2012, 2023, 2026
5	Boston Celtics vs. Los Angeles Lakers	Celtics, 4–1	1962*, 1966, 1969, 1984, 2010
4	Atlanta/St. Louis Hawks vs. Boston Celtics	Celtics, 4–0	1957**, 1960, 1988, 2008
4	St. Louis Hawks vs. Los Angeles/Minneapolis Lakers	Tie, 2–2	1960, 1961, 1963, 1966
4	Boston Celtics vs. Milwaukee Bucks	Celtics, 4–0	1974, 1987, 2018, 2022
3	New York Knicks vs. Baltimore/Capital/Washington Bullets	Knicks, 2–1	1970, 1971, 1974
3	Milwaukee Bucks vs. Philadelphia 76ers	76ers, 2–1	1981, 1986, 2001
3	Boston Celtics vs. Cleveland Cavaliers	Cavaliers, 2–1	1992, 2008, 2018
3	Houston Rockets vs. Oklahoma City Thunder/Seattle SuperSonics	Rockets, 2–1	1993*, 1997, 2020
3	Indiana Pacers vs. New York Knicks	Pacers, 2–1	1994, 1995, 2024
3	Boston Celtics vs. Miami Heat	Heat, 2–1	2012, 2022, 2023
2	Los Angeles/Minneapolis Lakers vs. New York Knicks	Tie, 1–1	1952, 1970
2	Los Angeles Lakers vs. Phoenix Suns	Tie, 1–1	1970, 2006
2	Chicago Bulls vs. Los Angeles Lakers	Lakers, 2–0	1971, 1973
2	Boston Celtics vs. New York Knicks	Tie, 1–1	1973, 1984
2	Chicago Bulls vs. Detroit Pistons	Tie, 1–1	1974, 1990
2	Seattle SuperSonics vs. Phoenix Suns	Tie, 1–1	1979, 1993
2	Chicago Bulls vs. New York Knicks	Tie, 1–1	1992, 1994
2	Denver Nuggets vs. Utah Jazz	Tie, 1–1	1994, 2020
2	Houston Rockets vs. Phoenix Suns	Rockets, 2–0	1994, 1995
2	Miami Heat vs. New York Knicks	Tie, 1–1	1997, 2000
2	Philadelphia 76ers vs. Toronto Raptors	Tie, 1–1	2001, 2019
2	Detroit Pistons vs. Orlando Magic	Pistons, 2–0	2003, 2026
2	Dallas Mavericks vs. San Antonio Spurs	Tie, 1–1	2006*, 2014
2	Cleveland Cavaliers vs. Detroit Pistons	Tie, 1–1	2006, 2026
2	Memphis Grizzlies vs. Oklahoma City Thunder	Thunder, 2–0	2011, 2014
2	Golden State Warriors vs. Houston Rockets	Warriors, 2–0	2018, 2025
2	Denver Nuggets vs. Los Angeles Clippers	Nuggets, 2–0	2020, 2025

== Notes ==
- ^{a} The home-and-away format in every round of the playoffs is the 2–2–1–1–1 format (the team with the better regular season record plays on their home court in games one, two, five and seven). The format of the finals from 1985 to 2013 used the 2–3–2 format (the team with the better regular season record plays on their home court in games one, two, six and seven). In the past, there have been several other formats used in the playoffs.
- ^{b} Won as the designated road team at a neutral-site game.
