= List of Golden State Warriors seasons =

The Golden State Warriors are an American professional basketball team based in San Francisco. The team is a member of the Pacific Division of the Western Conference in the National Basketball Association (NBA). The Warriors joined the Basketball Association of America (BAA) as the Philadelphia Warriors in 1946. The team joined the NBA following the BAA-NBL merger in 1949. Franklin Mieuli and the Diners Club put together a group of 40 local investors to move the Warriors to San Francisco before the 1962–63 NBA season, with Mieuli eventually buying all the shares of the franchise to keep the team from collapsing and to keep it in the area. After playing several home games in Oakland from 1967 onward, the team moved to Oakland full-time for the 1971–72 NBA season and changed its name to the Golden State Warriors. The team moved to San Francisco in 2019.

== Table key ==
AHC	NBA All-Star Game Head Coach
ASG MVP	All-Star Game Most Valuable Player
COY	Coach of the Year
DPOY	Defensive Player of the Year
Finish	Final position in division standings
GB	Games behind first-place team in division^{[b]}
Losses	Number of regular season losses
EOY	Executive of the Year
FMVP	Finals Most Valuable Player
MVP	Most Valuable Player
ROY	Rookie of the Year
SIX	Sixth Man of the Year
SPOR	Sportsmanship Award
JWKC	Citizenship Award
Wins	Number of regular season wins

== Seasons ==
Note: Statistics are correct as of the 2025–26 NBA season.

NBA champions	Conference champions	Division champions	Playoff berth	Play-in berth

Season	Team	League	Conference	Finish	Division	Finish	W	L	Win%	GB	Playoffs	Awards	Head coach
Philadelphia Warriors
1946–47	1946–47	BAA	—	—	Eastern	2nd	35	25	.583	14	Won First round (Bombers) 2–1; Won BAA Semifinals (Knicks) 2–0; Won BAA Finals (Stags) 4–1		Eddie Gottlieb
1947–48	1947–48	BAA	—	—	Eastern	1st	27	21	.563	—	Won BAA Semifinals (Bombers) 4–3; Lost BAA Finals (Bullets) 4–2		Eddie Gottlieb
1948–49	1948–49	BAA	—	—	Eastern	4th	28	32	.467	10	Lost Division semifinals (Capitols) 2–0		Eddie Gottlieb
1949–50	1949–50	NBA	—	—	Eastern	4th	26	42	.382	27	Lost Division semifinals (Nationals) 2–0		Eddie Gottlieb
1950–51	1950–51	NBA	—	—	Eastern	1st	40	26	.606	—	Lost Division semifinals (Nationals) 2–0		Eddie Gottlieb
1951–52	1951–52	NBA	—	—	Eastern	4th	33	33	.500	7	Lost Division semifinals (Nationals) 2–1	Paul Arizin (ASG MVP)	Eddie Gottlieb
1952–53	1952–53	NBA	—	—	Eastern	5th	12	57	.174	34.5			Eddie Gottlieb
1953–54	1953–54	NBA	—	—	Eastern	4th	29	43	.403	15			Eddie Gottlieb
1954–55	1954–55	NBA	—	—	Eastern	4th	33	39	.458	10			Eddie Gottlieb
1955–56	1955–56	NBA	—	—	Eastern	1st	45	27	.625	—	Won Division finals (Nationals) 3–2; Won NBA Finals (Pistons) 4–1		George Senesky
1956–57	1956–57	NBA	—	—	Eastern	3rd	37	35	.514	7	Lost Division semifinals (Nationals) 2–0		George Senesky
1957–58	1957–58	NBA	—	—	Eastern	3rd	37	35	.514	12	Won Division semifinals (Nationals) 2–1; Lost Division finals (Celtics) 4–1	Woody Sauldsberry (ROY)	George Senesky
1958–59	1958–59	NBA	—	—	Eastern	4th	32	40	.444	20			Al Cervi
1959–60	1959–60	NBA	—	—	Eastern	2nd	49	26	.653	10	Won Division semifinals (Nationals) 2–1; Lost Division finals (Celtics) 4–2	Wilt Chamberlain (MVP, ROY, ASG MVP)	Neil Johnston
1960–61	1960–61	NBA	—	—	Eastern	2nd	46	33	.582	11	Lost Division semifinals (Nationals) 3–0		Neil Johnston
1961–62	1961–62	NBA	—	—	Eastern	2nd	49	31	.613	11	Won Division semifinals (Nationals) 3–2; Lost Division finals (Celtics) 4–3		Frank McGuire
San Francisco Warriors
1962–63	1962–63	NBA	—	—	Western	4th	31	49	.388	22			Bob Feerick
1963–64	1963–64	NBA	—	—	Western	1st	48	32	.600	—	Won Division finals (Hawks) 4–3; Lost NBA Finals (Celtics) 4–1	Alex Hannum (COY)	Alex Hannum
1964–65	1964–65	NBA	—	—	Western	5th	17	63	.213	32			Alex Hannum
1965–66	1965–66	NBA	—	—	Western	4th	35	45	.438	10		Rick Barry (ROY)	Alex Hannum
1966–67	1966–67	NBA	—	—	Western	1st	44	37	.543	—	Won Division semifinals (Lakers) 3–0; Won Division finals (Hawks) 4–2; Lost NBA Finals (76ers) 4–2	Rick Barry (ASG MVP)	Bill Sharman
1967–68	1967–68	NBA	—	—	Western	3rd	43	39	.524	13	Won Division semifinals (Hawks) 4–2; Lost Division finals (Lakers) 4–0		Bill Sharman
1968–69	1968–69	NBA	—	—	Western	3rd	41	41	.500	14	Lost Division semifinals (Lakers) 4–2		George Lee
1969–70	1969–70	NBA	—	—	Western	6th	30	52	.366	18			George Lee; Al Attles
1970–71	1970–71	NBA	Western	4th	Pacific	2nd	41	41	.500	7	Lost conference semifinals (Bucks) 4–1		Al Attles
Golden State Warriors
1971–72	1971–72	NBA	Western	4th	Pacific	2nd	51	31	.622	18	Lost conference semifinals (Bucks) 4–1		Al Attles
1972–73	1972–73	NBA	Western	4th	Pacific	2nd	47	35	.573	13	Won conference semifinals (Bucks) 4–2; Lost conference finals (Lakers) 4–1		Al Attles
1973–74	1973–74	NBA	Western	5th	Pacific	2nd	44	38	.537	3			Al Attles
1974–75	1974–75	NBA	Western	1st	Pacific	1st	48	34	.585	—	Won conference semifinals (SuperSonics) 4–2; Won conference finals (Bulls) 4–3; Won NBA Finals (Bullets) 4–0	Rick Barry (FMVP); Jamaal Wilkes (ROY); Dick Vertlieb (EOY)	Al Attles
1975–76	1975–76	NBA	Western	1st	Pacific	1st	59	23	.720	—	Won conference semifinals (Pistons) 4–2; Lost conference finals (Suns) 4–3		Al Attles
1976–77	1976–77	NBA	Western	4th	Pacific	3rd	46	36	.561	7	Won First round (Pistons) 2–1; Lost conference semifinals (Lakers) 4–3		Al Attles
1977–78	1977–78	NBA	Western	7th	Pacific	5th	43	39	.524	15			Al Attles
1978–79	1978–79	NBA	Western	T-8th	Pacific	6th	38	44	.463	14			Al Attles
1979–80	1979–80	NBA	Western	T-10th	Pacific	6th	24	58	.293	36			Al Attles; Johnny Bach
1980–81	1980–81	NBA	Western	7th	Pacific	4th	39	43	.476	18			Al Attles
1981–82	1981–82	NBA	Western	7th	Pacific	4th	45	37	.549	12			Al Attles
1982–83	1982–83	NBA	Western	T-9th	Pacific	5th	30	52	.366	28			Al Attles
1983–84	1983–84	NBA	Western	T-9th	Pacific	5th	37	45	.451	17			Johnny Bach
1984–85	1984–85	NBA	Western	12th	Pacific	6th	22	60	.268	40			Johnny Bach
1985–86	1985–86	NBA	Western	12th	Pacific	6th	30	52	.366	32			Johnny Bach
1986–87	1986–87	NBA	Western	5th	Pacific	3rd	42	40	.512	23	Won First round (Jazz) 3–2; Lost conference semifinals (Lakers) 4–1		George Karl
1987–88	1987–88	NBA	Western	11th	Pacific	5th	20	62	.244	42			George Karl; Ed Gregory
1988–89	1988–89	NBA	Western	7th	Pacific	4th	43	39	.524	14	Won First round (Jazz) 3–0; Lost conference semifinals (Suns) 4–1	Mitch Richmond (ROY)	Don Nelson
1989–90	1989–90	NBA	Western	10th	Pacific	5th	37	45	.451	26			Don Nelson
1990–91	1990–91	NBA	Western	7th	Pacific	4th	44	38	.537	19	Won First round (Spurs) 3–1; Lost conference semifinals (Lakers) 4–1		Don Nelson
1991–92	1991–92	NBA	Western	3rd	Pacific	2nd	55	27	.671	2	Lost First round (SuperSonics) 3–1	Don Nelson (COY)	Don Nelson
1992–93	1992–93	NBA	Western	10th	Pacific	6th	34	48	.415	28			Don Nelson
1993–94	1993–94	NBA	Western	6th	Pacific	3rd	50	32	.610	13	Lost First round (Suns) 3–0	Chris Webber (ROY)	Don Nelson
1994–95	1994–95	NBA	Western	11th	Pacific	6th	26	56	.317	33			Don Nelson; Bob Lanier
1995–96	1995–96	NBA	Western	9th	Pacific	6th	36	46	.439	28			Rick Adelman
1996–97	1996–97	NBA	Western	10th	Pacific	7th	30	52	.366	27			Rick Adelman
1997–98	1997–98	NBA	Western	T-11th	Pacific	6th	19	63	.232	42			P. J. Carlesimo
1998–99	1998–99	NBA	Western	10th	Pacific	6th	21	29	.420	14			P. J. Carlesimo
1999–00	1999–00	NBA	Western	13th	Pacific	6th	19	63	.232	48			P. J. Carlesimo; Garry St. Jean
2000–01	2000–01	NBA	Western	14th	Pacific	7th	17	65	.207	39			Dave Cowens
2001–02	2001–02	NBA	Western	14th	Pacific	7th	21	61	.256	40			Dave Cowens; Brian Winters
2002–03	2002–03	NBA	Western	11th	Pacific	6th	38	44	.463	21		Gilbert Arenas (MIP)	Eric Musselman
2003–04	2003–04	NBA	Western	12th	Pacific	5th	37	45	.451	19			Eric Musselman
2004–05	2004–05	NBA	Western	12th	Pacific	5th	34	48	.415	28			Mike Montgomery
2005–06	2005–06	NBA	Western	12th	Pacific	5th	34	48	.415	20			Mike Montgomery
2006–07	2006–07	NBA	Western	8th	Pacific	3rd	42	40	.512	19	Won First round (Mavericks) 4–2; Lost conference semifinals (Jazz) 4–1	Monta Ellis (MIP)	Don Nelson
2007–08	2007–08	NBA	Western	9th	Pacific	3rd	48	34	.585	9			Don Nelson
2008–09	2008–09	NBA	Western	10th	Pacific	3rd	29	53	.354	36			Don Nelson
2009–10	2009–10	NBA	Western	13th	Pacific	4th	26	56	.317	31			Don Nelson
2010–11	2010–11	NBA	Western	12th	Pacific	3rd	36	46	.439	21		Stephen Curry (SPOR)	Keith Smart
2011–12	2011–12	NBA	Western	13th	Pacific	4th	23	43	.348	18			Mark Jackson
2012–13	2012–13	NBA	Western	6th	Pacific	2nd	47	35	.573	9	Won First round (Nuggets) 4–2; Lost conference semifinals (Spurs) 4–2		Mark Jackson
2013–14	2013–14	NBA	Western	6th	Pacific	2nd	51	31	.622	6	Lost First round (Clippers) 4–3		Mark Jackson
2014–15	2014–15	NBA	Western	1st	Pacific	1st	67	15	.817	—	Won First round (Pelicans) 4–0; Won conference semifinals (Grizzlies) 4–2; Won conference finals (Rockets) 4–1; Won NBA Finals (Cavaliers) 4–2	Stephen Curry (MVP); Andre Iguodala (FMVP); Bob Myers (EOY)	Steve Kerr
2015–16	2015–16	NBA	Western	1st	Pacific	1st	73	9	.890	—	Won First round (Rockets) 4–1; Won conference semifinals (Trail Blazers) 4–1; Won conference finals (Thunder) 4–3; Lost NBA Finals (Cavaliers) 4–3	Stephen Curry (MVP); Steve Kerr (COY)	Steve Kerr
2016–17	2016–17	NBA	Western	1st	Pacific	1st	67	15	.817	—	Won First round (Trail Blazers) 4–0; Won conference semifinals (Jazz) 4–0; Won conference finals (Spurs) 4–0; Won NBA Finals (Cavaliers) 4–1	Kevin Durant (FMVP); Draymond Green (DPOY); Bob Myers (EOY)	Steve Kerr
2017–18	2017–18	NBA	Western	2nd	Pacific	1st	58	24	.707	7	Won First round (Spurs) 4–1; Won conference semifinals (Pelicans) 4–1; Won conference finals (Rockets) 4–3; Won NBA Finals (Cavaliers) 4–0	Kevin Durant (FMVP)	Steve Kerr
2018–19	2018–19	NBA	Western	1st	Pacific	1st	57	25	.695	—	Won First round (Clippers) 4–2; Won conference semifinals (Rockets) 4–2; Won conference finals (Trail Blazers) 4–0; Lost NBA Finals (Raptors) 4–2	Kevin Durant (ASG MVP)	Steve Kerr
2019–20	2019–20	NBA	Western	15th	Pacific	5th	15	50	.231	34			Steve Kerr
2020–21	2020–21	NBA	Western	9th (Note: Fell to 9th seed after losing to the Memphis Grizzlies in the NBA play-in tournament.)	Pacific	4th	39	33	.542	12			Steve Kerr
2021–22	2021–22	NBA	Western	3rd	Pacific	2nd	53	29	.646	11	Won First round (Nuggets) 4–1; Won conference semifinals (Grizzlies) 4–2; Won conference finals (Mavericks) 4–1; Won NBA Finals (Celtics) 4–2	Stephen Curry (FMVP, ASG MVP)	Steve Kerr
2022–23	2022–23	NBA	Western	6th	Pacific	4th	44	38	.537	9	Won First round (Kings) 4–3; Lost conference semifinals (Lakers) 4–2	Stephen Curry (JWKC)	Steve Kerr
2023–24	2023–24	NBA	Western	10th	Pacific	5th	46	36	.561	11			Steve Kerr
2024–25	2024–25	NBA	Western	7th	Pacific	3rd	48	34	.585	20	Won First round (Rockets) 4–3; Lost conference semifinals (Timberwolves) 4–1	Stephen Curry (ASG MVP)	Steve Kerr
2025–26	2025–26	NBA	Western	9th (Note: Rose to 9th seed after defeating the Los Angeles Clippers in the NBA play-in tournament.)	Pacific	4th	37	45	.451	27			Steve Kerr

== All-time records ==
Statistic	Wins	Losses	Win%
Philadelphia Warriors regular season record (1947–1962)	558	545	.506
San Francisco Warriors regular season record (1963–1971)	330	399	.453
Golden State Warriors regular season record (1972–present)	2,166	2,269	.488
All-time regular season record (1947–present)	3,054	3,213	.487
Philadelphia Warriors post-season record (1947–1962)	36	41	.468
San Francisco Warriors post-season record (1963–1971)	21	27	.438
Golden State Warriors post-season record (1972–present)	161	111	.592
All-time post-season record (1947–present)	217	179	.548
All-time regular and post-season record (1947–present)	3,271	3,392	.491
