= Ken Loeffler =

American basketball coach

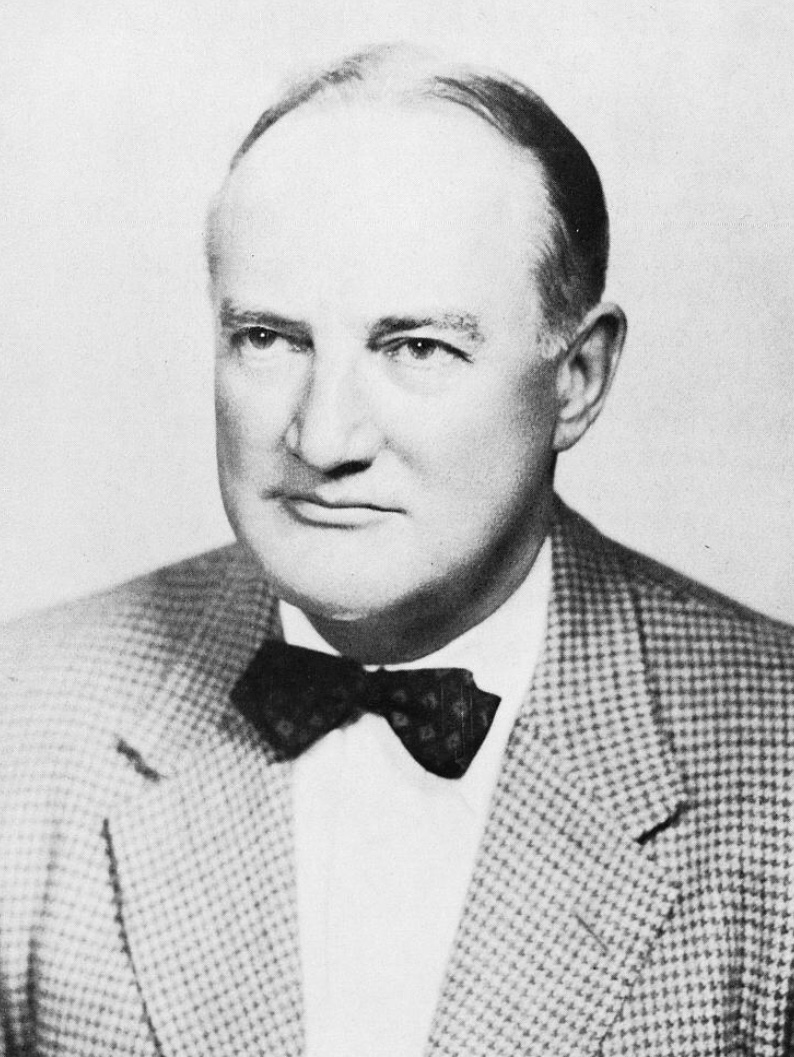
- Loeffler from the 1956 Aggieland

Biographical details
- Born: April 14, 1902
- Died: January 1, 1975 (aged 72); Rumson, New Jersey, U.S.

Playing career
- 1920–1924: Penn State

Coaching career (HC unless noted)
- 1928–1935: Geneva
- 1935–1942: Yale
- 1945–1946: Denver
- 1946–1948: St. Louis Bombers
- 1948–1949: Providence Steamrollers
- 1949–1955: La Salle
- 1955–1957: Texas A&M

Head coaching record
- Overall: 320–213 (college); 79–90 (professional)
- Tournaments: 9–1 (NCAA); 5–3 (NIT); 4–6 (BAA playoffs)

Accomplishments and honors

Championships
- NCAA (1954); 2× NCAA Final Four (1954, 1955); NIT (1952)

Records
- 2× UPI Coach of the Year (1952, 1954)
- Basketball Hall of Fame; Inducted in 1964 (profile)
- College Basketball Hall of Fame; Inducted in 2006

Kenneth D. Loeffler (April 14, 1902 – January 1, 1975) was an American collegiate and professional basketball coach. He was mostly known for guiding the La Salle Explorers men's basketball team to the 1952 National Invitation Tournament and 1954 NCAA basketball tournament titles.

After earning a Bachelor's degree at Pennsylvania State University (1920–24) and a short pro basketball career (1924–29), the Beaver Falls, Pennsylvania native began his collegiate coaching career at Geneva College (1928–35). In 1935 he became basketball head coach at Yale University, and also assistant coach to the football and baseball varsity. In seven years at Yale Loeffler put up a 61–82 record. During World War II he served in the U.S. Air Force.

After the war Loeffler began coaching pro teams in the Basketball Association of America, first the St. Louis Bombers (1946–48), then the Providence Steamrollers (1948–49). In 1949 he returned to the college ranks when he became head coach at La Salle. With players like future Hall of Famer Tom Gola, Loeffler's La Salle teams went on to dominate college basketball over half a decade in the early 1950s. In six seasons at La Salle, Loeffler led the Explorers to a post-season appearance in every single season. Under Loeffler, La Salle made four trips to the NIT (before it was considered "second-rate") and two visits to the NCAA tournament. In 1955 Loeffler moved on to become the head coach at Texas A&M College, a post he held until 1957.

On October 1, 1964, Loeffler was elected to the Naismith Memorial Basketball Hall of Fame. He died on January 1, 1975, of an apparent heart attack, in Rumson, New Jersey.

== Head coaching record ==
=== College ===
Record table
Season	Team	Overall	Conference	Standing	Postseason
Geneva Covenanters (Independent) (1928–1935)
1928–29	Geneva	14–5			
1929–30	Geneva	10–9			
1930–31	Geneva	13–10			
1931–32	Geneva	14–7			
1932–33	Geneva	13–6			
1933–34	Geneva	13–9			
1934–35	Geneva	16–7			
Geneva:		93–53 (.637)			
Yale Bulldogs (Eastern Intercollegiate Basketball League) (1935–1942)
1935–36	Yale	8–16	6–6	T–3rd	
1936–37	Yale	12–8	7–5	T–3rd	
1937–38	Yale	7–12	3–9	7th	
1938–39	Yale	4–16	3–9	6th	
1939–40	Yale	13–6	7–5	T–3rd	
1940–41	Yale	10–12	4–8	T–4th	
1941–42	Yale	7–12	3–9	6th	
Yale:		61–82 (.427)	33–51 (.393)		
Denver Pioneers (Mountain States Conference) (1945–1946)
1945–46	Denver	9–15	1–11	7th	
Denver:		9–15 (.375)	1–11 (.083)		
La Salle Explorers (Independent) (1949–1955)
1949–50	La Salle	21–4			NIT Quarterfinal
1950–51	La Salle	22–7			NIT First Round
1951–52	La Salle	24–5			NIT Champion
1952–53	La Salle	25–3			NIT Quarterfinal
1953–54	La Salle	26–4			NCAA Champion
1954–55	La Salle	26–5			NCAA Runner-up
La Salle:		144–28 (.837)			
Texas A&M Aggies (Southwest Conference) (1955–1957)
1955–56	Texas A&M	6–18	3–9	T–5th	
1956–57	Texas A&M	7–17	3–9	T–6th	
Texas A&M:		13–35 (.271)	6–18 (.250)		
Total:		320–213 (.600)			
National champion Postseason invitational champion Conference regular season champion Conference regular season and conference tournament champion Division regular season champion Division regular season and conference tournament champion Conference tournament champion

=== Professional basketball ===
Legend
Regular season	G	Games coached	W	Games won	L	Games lost	W–L %	Win–loss %
Playoffs	PG	Playoff games	PW	Playoff wins	PL	Playoff losses	PW–L %	Playoff win–loss %

Team	Year	G	W	L	W–L%	Finish	PG	PW	PL	PW–L%	Result
St. Louis	1946–47	61	38	23	.623	2nd in Western	3	1	2	.333	Lost in League Quarterfinals
St. Louis	1947–48	48	29	19	.604	1st in Western	7	3	4	.429	Lost in League Semifinals
Providence	1948–49	60	12	48	.200	6th in Eastern	-	-	-	-	Missed Playoffs
Career		169	79	90	.467		10	4	6	.400	

== See also ==
- List of NCAA Division I Men's Final Four appearances by coach
