= George Munroe =

George Munroe may refer to:

- George Munroe (basketball) (1922-2014), American basketball player
- George H. Munroe (1844-1912), American politician and businessman
- George W. Munroe (1857-1932), American actor known for female impersonation
