= Delbert Smith =

Delbert Smith may refer to:

- Deb Smith (Delbert Bower Smith, 1920–2009), American basketball player
- Delbert K. Smith (1862–1905), American farmer and politician in Wisconsin
