= 1948 BAA playoffs =

Postseason tournament

Tournament details
- Dates: March 23 – April 21, 1948
- Season: 1947–48
- Teams: 6

Final positions
- Champions: Baltimore Bullets (1st title)
- Runners-up: Philadelphia Warriors
- Semifinalists: Chicago Stags; St. Louis Bombers

The 1948 BAA playoffs was the postseason tournament following the Basketball Association of America 1947–48 season. Following its third, 1948–49 season, the BAA and National Basketball League merged to create the National Basketball Association or NBA. The tournament concluded with the Baltimore Bullets defeating the Philadelphia Warriors 4 games to 2 in the BAA Finals.

The two Division champions and two teams involved in a 3-way tiebreaker began tournament play on Tuesday, March 23, and the Finals concluded on Wednesday, April 21. Baltimore and Philadelphia played 12 and 13 games in the span of 30 days; their six final games in 12 days.

Due to changes with the rivaling National Basketball League (mainly the removal of the previous defending champions in the Chicago American Gears), the BAA would not face any direct competition with the 1948 NBL playoffs despite their playoff dates overlapping with the BAA's playoff dates once again. Not only that, but with the Chicago Stags being eliminated from playoff contention on April 8 by the eventual BAA champion Baltimore Bullets in the city of Baltimore, they would also see no real competition from the 1948 World Professional Basketball Tournament held in Chicago from April 8–11, 1948, which featured five teams from the rivaling National Basketball League, the Wilkes-Barre Barons from the rivaling American Basketball League that the Bullets used to be a part of, and two independently ran teams in the Bridgeport Newfield Steelers and the all-black New York Renaissance; both of those rivaling professional tournaments would end with the NBL turned future BAA/NBA team known as the Minneapolis Lakers winning both of those events over the Rochester Royals and the New York Renaissance, respectively.

== Bracket ==
There were no byes. Western and Eastern champions St. Louis and Philadelphia immediately played a long semifinal series with St. Louis having home-court advantage. Philadelphia won the seventh game in St. Louis, 85–46, two days before Baltimore concluded its sequence of tie-breaker (not shown) and two short series with other runners-up.

First Round
W2 | Baltimore | 2
E2 | New York | 1
E3 | Boston | 1
W3 | Chicago | 2

BAA Semifinals
W1 | St. Louis* | 3
E1 | Philadelphia* | 4
W2 | Baltimore | 2
W3 | Chicago | 0

BAA Finals
E1 | Philadelphia* | 2
W2 | Baltimore | 4

- * Division winner
- Bold Series winner

== Division Tiebreakers ==
=== Western Division Tiebreakers ===
==== Washington Capitols @ Chicago Stags ====
March 23

Boxscore

Washington Capitols 70, Chicago Stags 74
Scoring by quarter: 16–10, 20–22, 21–20, 13–22
| Pts: Feerick, Scolari 16 each | Pts: Max Zaslofsky 24 |
Washington fails to qualify

Chicago Stadium, Chicago, Illinois
Referees: Ed Boyle, Jim Beiersdorfer

==== Baltimore Bullets @ Chicago Stags ====
March 25

Boxscore

Baltimore Bullets 75, Chicago Stags 72
Scoring by quarter: 10–17, 21–15, 17–21, 27–19
| Pts: Kleggie Hermsen 14 | Pts: Max Zaslofsky 21 |
Baltimore finishes as the West's #2 seed, Chicago as the West's #3 seed

Chicago Stadium, Chicago, Illinois
Referees: Ed Boyle, Jim Beiersdorfer

== First round ==
=== (W2) Baltimore Bullets vs. (E2) New York Knicks ===
March 27

Boxscore

New York Knicks 81, Baltimore Bullets 85
Scoring by quarter: 21–19, 22–26, 19–21, 19–19
| Pts: Bud Palmer 21 | Pts: Connie Simmons 34 |
Baltimore leads series, 1–0

Baltimore Coliseum, Baltimore, Maryland

March 28

Boxscore

Baltimore Bullets 69, New York Knicks 79
Scoring by half: 30–33, 39–46
| Pts: Connie Simmons 23 | Pts: Bud Palmer 18 |
Series tied, 1–1

Madison Square Garden III, Manhattan, New York

April 1

Boxscore

New York Knicks 77, Baltimore Bullets 84
Scoring by half: 46–41, 31–43
| Pts: Sid Tanenbaum 18 | Pts: Connie Simmons 22 |
Baltimore wins series, 2–1

Baltimore Coliseum, Baltimore, Maryland

This was the first playoff meeting between these two teams.

=== (E3) Boston Celtics vs. (W3) Chicago Stags ===
March 28

Boxscore

Chicago Stags 79, Boston Celtics 72
Scoring by half: 29–32, 50–40
| Pts: Max Zaslofsky 18 | Pts: Sadowski, Riebe 22 each |
Chicago leads series, 1–0

Boston Garden, Boston, Massachusetts

March 31

Boxscore

Chicago Stags 77, Boston Celtics 81
Scoring by half: 33–40, 44–41
| Pts: Max Zaslofsky 22 | Pts: Saul Mariaschin 17 |
Series tied, 1–1

Boston Garden, Boston, Massachusetts

April 2

Boxscore

Chicago Stags 81, Boston Celtics 74
Scoring by half: 37–40, 44–34
| Pts: Max Zaslofsky 31 | Pts: Ed Sadowski 26 |
Chicago wins series, 2–1

Boston Garden, Boston, Massachusetts

This was the first playoff meeting between these two teams.

== BAA Semifinals ==
=== (W1) St. Louis Bombers vs. (E1) Philadelphia Warriors ===
March 23

Boxscore

Philadelphia Warriors 58, St. Louis Bombers 60
Scoring by half: 29–31, 29–29
| Pts: Joe Fulks 18; Asts: Howie Dallmar 3 | Pts: Belus Smawley 21; Asts: John Logan 2 |
St. Louis leads series, 1–0

St. Louis Arena, St. Louis, Missouri

March 25

Boxscore

Philadelphia Warriors 65, St. Louis Bombers 64
Scoring by half: 31–37, 34–29
| Pts: George Senesky 20; Asts: Howie Dallmar 2 | Pts: Belus Smawley 13; Asts: Bob Doll 3 |
Series tied, 1–1

St. Louis Arena, St. Louis, Missouri

March 27

Boxscore

St. Louis Bombers 56, Philadelphia Warriors 84
Scoring by quarter: 17–17, 11–18, 13–25, 15–24
| Pts: Rocha, Maughan 16 each Asts: Don Putman 2 | Pts: Joe Fulks 30; Asts: Howie Dallmar 5 |
Philadelphia leads series, 2–1

Philadelphia Arena, Philadelphia, Pennsylvania

March 30

Boxscore

St. Louis Bombers 56, Philadelphia Warriors 51
Scoring by half: 29–28, 27–23
| Pts: Red Rocha 19; Asts: Red Rocha 2 | Pts: Joe Fulks 21; Asts: Howie Dallmar 2 |
Series tied, 2–2

Philadelphia Arena, Philadelphia, Pennsylvania

April 1

Boxscore

Philadelphia Warriors 62, St. Louis Bombers 69
Scoring by half: 34–36, 28–33
| Pts: Joe Fulks 17; Asts: Howie Dallmar 2 | Pts: Red Rocha 22; Asts: John Logan 4 |
St. Louis leads series, 3–2

St. Louis Arena, St. Louis, Missouri

April 3

Boxscore

St. Louis Bombers 61, Philadelphia Warriors 84
Scoring by half: 30–47, 31–37
| Pts: Rocha, Logan 11 each Asts: four players 1 each | Pts: Joe Fulks 23; Asts: Howie Dallmar 5 |
Series tied, 3–3

Philadelphia Arena, Philadelphia, Pennsylvania

April 6

Boxscore

Philadelphia Warriors 85, St. Louis Bombers 46
Scoring by half: 38–21, 47–25
| Pts: Joe Fulks 15; Asts: Chink Crossin 4 | Pts: John Logan 18; Asts: Logan, Smawley 1 each |
Philadelphia wins series, 4–3

St. Louis Arena, St. Louis, Missouri

- This was the first game 7 in league history and also the first road team to win game 7. It was also the Warriors' last game 7 win on the road until 2018.

This was the second playoff meeting between these two teams, with the Warriors winning the first meeting.

Previous playoff series
Philadelphia leads 1–0 in all-time playoff series

1947

Philadelphia Warriors 2, St. Louis Bombers 1

1947 BAA First Round

=== (W2) Baltimore Bullets vs. (W3) Chicago Stags ===
April 7

Boxscore

Baltimore Bullets 73, Chicago Stags 67
Scoring by half: 41–27, 32–40
| Pts: Paul Hoffman 19 | Pts: Zaslofsky, Miasek 15 each |
Baltimore leads series, 1–0

Chicago Stadium, Chicago, Illinois

April 8

Boxscore

Chicago Stags 72, Baltimore Bullets 89
Scoring by half: 41–38, 31–51
| Pts: Stan Miasek 27 | Pts: Chick Reiser 18 |
Baltimore wins series, 2–0

Baltimore Coliseum, Baltimore, Maryland
Attendance: 7,201

This was the first playoff meeting between these two teams.

== BAA Finals: (E1) Philadelphia Warriors vs. (W2) Baltimore Bullets ==
April 10

Boxscore

Baltimore Bullets 60, Philadelphia Warriors 71
Scoring by quarter: 12–17, 7–17, 21–21, 20–16
| Pts: Connie Simmons 15; Asts: Jeannette, Schulz 2 each | Pts: Chick Halbert 19; Asts: Howie Dallmar 3 |
Philadelphia leads series, 1–0

Philadelphia Arena, Philadelphia, Pennsylvania
Attendance: 7,201

April 13

Boxscore

Baltimore Bullets 66, Philadelphia Warriors 63
Scoring by quarter: 13–19, 7–22, 20–7, 26–15
| Pts: Connie Simmons 25; Asts: Kleggie Hermsen 3 | Pts: Joe Fulks 27; Asts: Dallmar, Musi 2 each |
Series tied, 1–1

Philadelphia Arena, Philadelphia, Pennsylvania
Attendance: 6,982

April 15

Boxscore

Philadelphia Warriors 70, Baltimore Bullets 72
Scoring by quarter: 12–11, 18–20, 17–18, 23–23
| Pts: Joe Fulks 21; Asts: Kaplowitz, Dallmar 2 each | Pts: Connie Simmons 14; Asts: Kleggie Hermsen 3 |
Baltimore leads series, 2–1

Baltimore Coliseum, Baltimore, Maryland
Attendance: 4,500

April 17

Boxscore

Philadelphia Warriors 75, Baltimore Bullets 78
Scoring by quarter: 13–20, 15–20, 17–12, 30–26
| Pts: Joe Fulks 29; Asts: Howie Dallmar 3 | Pts: Paul Hoffman 27; Asts: Hermsen, Jeannette 2 each |
Baltimore leads series, 3–1

Baltimore Coliseum, Baltimore, Maryland
Attendance: 4,500

April 20

Boxscore

Baltimore Bullets 82, Philadelphia Warriors 91
Scoring by quarter: 19–20, 14–18, 26–23, 23–30
| Pts: Connie Simmons 16; Asts: Chick Reiser 2 | Pts: Joe Fulks 19; Asts: Howie Dallmar 4 |
Baltimore leads series, 3–2

Philadelphia Arena, Philadelphia, Pennsylvania
Attendance: 6,012

April 21

Boxscore

Philadelphia Warriors 73, Baltimore Bullets 88
Scoring by quarter: 18–13, 13–24, 17–26, 25–25
| Pts: Joe Fulks 28; Asts: Howie Dallmar 2 | Pts: Chick Reiser 16; Asts: Connie Simmons 6 |
Baltimore wins series, 4–2

Baltimore Coliseum, Baltimore, Maryland
Attendance: 4,500

This was the first playoff meeting between these two teams.

== See also ==
- NBA records
