= 1946–47 St. Louis Bombers season =

- Head coach: Ken Loeffler
- General manager: Emory D. Jones
- Owner: Emory D. Jones
- Arena: St. Louis Arena

Results
- Record: 38–23 (.623)
- Place: Division: 2nd (Western)
- Playoff finish: Lost BAA Quarterfinals
- Stats at Basketball Reference
- Radio: WIL

The 1946–47 BAA season was the first season for the St. Louis Bombers in the BAA (which later became the NBA). This season would be notable for providing the first ever instance in BAA/NBA history of a team scoring 100 or more points in a game, with the Bombers scoring 103 points in a 103–90 win over the Chicago Stags on January 1, 1947. The Bombers were seen as one of the better BAA teams in the league, with them having a 38–23 record in their inaugural season, with their extra game played this season being a tiebreaker loss to the Chicago Stags. However, they would end up losing 2–1 to the eventual champion Philadelphia Warriors in the quarterfinal round of the inaugural 1947 BAA playoffs. Greater details on their first season would be explored in Charley Rosen's book called "The First Tip-Off: The Incredible Story of the Birth of the NBA", with an entire (short) chapter dedicated to the Bombers' first season in the BAA alongside the various highs and lows (mostly highs) that would end up leading them to their eventual downfall as a franchise, with their philosophy of play that was utilized by head coach Ken Loeffler being reliant on speedy play on both ends of the court under this early era of basketball, which helpde shape the sport in its early history for what could be seen as an early indicatory of the run and gun style of play.

== Roster ==
Due to this being the first season in the franchise's history, the BAA didn't utilize a draft system like they would in future seasons of the BAA/NBA and instead relied upon some combination of the head coach and the general manager of the team finding and signing players in time to start out their training camp period for the season. For the Bombers, head coach Ken Loeffler chose his players that went against the old-fashioned style of play that hobbled certain teams like the Boston Celtics, Pittsburgh Ironmen, Cleveland Rebels under head coach Dutch Dehnert, and Toronto Huskies under player-coach Ed Sadowski (and to a lesser extent, the Detroit Falcons) this season and reflected the retrogressive philosophy of speedy play on both ends of the court that would make players feel like they wanted to hate their head coach at times, to the point where, outside of John Barr from Penn State University (who had experience playing in the older American Basketball League and minor league Pennsylvania State Basketball League after previously playing in the U.S. Navy), everyone only played either collegiately (Johnny Logan from the University of Indiana, Bob Doll from the University of Colorado, George Munroe from Dartmouth College, Don Putman from the University of Denver, Giff Roux from the University of Kansas, Cecil Hankins from the 1945 NCAA champion University of Oklahoma A&M team, Aubrey Davis from Oklahoma Baptist University, Don Martin from the University of Central Missouri, Herschel Baltimore from Penn State University, Deb Smith from the University of Utah, Fred Jacobs from the University of Denver, and Ralph Siewert from Dakota Wesleyan University) or had previously played within the U.S. military (Bob Doll being from the U.S. Navy and Aubrey Davis being from the U.S. Army Air Corp) only before entering the BAA with the Bombers to open up their first season of existence.

1946–47 St. Louis Bombers roster
Players

Pos.	No.	Player	Height	Weight	DOB	From
F	6	Herschel Baltimore	6 ft 4 in (1.93 m)	195 lb (88 kg)	1921-06-21	Penn State
F	8, 13	John Barr	6 ft 3 in (1.91 m)	205 lb (93 kg)	1918-08-08	Penn State
G/F	9, 10	Aubrey Davis	6 ft 2 in (1.88 m)	175 lb (79 kg)	1921-03-28	Oklahoma Baptist
F/C	5	Bob Doll	6 ft 5 in (1.96 m)	195 lb (88 kg)	1919-08-10	Colorado
G	9, 11	Cecil Hankins	6 ft 1 in (1.85 m)	175 lb (79 kg)	1922-01-06	Oklahoma State
F	4, 12	Fred Jacobs	6 ft 3 in (1.91 m)	175 lb (79 kg)	1922-12-02	Denver
G	7	Johnny Logan	6 ft 2 in (1.88 m)	175 lb (79 kg)	1921-01-01	Indiana
F/C	14	Don Martin	6 ft 7 in (2.01 m)	210 lb (95 kg)	1920-02-07	Central Missouri
G	3	George Munroe	5 ft 11 in (1.80 m)	170 lb (77 kg)	1922-01-05	Dartmouth
G	8, 13	Don Putman	6 ft 1 in (1.85 m)	170 lb (77 kg)	1922-11-13	Denver
F/C	12, 14	Giff Roux	6 ft 5 in (1.96 m)	195 lb (88 kg)	1923-06-28	Kansas
G	14	Belus Smawley	6 ft 1 in (1.85 m)	195 lb (88 kg)	1918-03-20	Appalachian State
F	10, 11	Deb Smith	6 ft 3 in (1.91 m)	180 lb (82 kg)	1920-01-07	Utah

Coaches
Head coach

Ken Loeffler

Legend
- (DP) Unsigned draft pick
- (FA) Free agent
- (S) Suspended
- Injured

Roster

== Regular season ==
=== Season standings ===
#	Western Division				
#	Team	W	L	PCT	GB
1	x-Chicago Stags	39	22	.639	–
2	x-St. Louis Bombers	38	23	.623	1
3	x-Cleveland Rebels	30	30	.500	8.5
4	Detroit Falcons	20	40	.333	18.5
5	Pittsburgh Ironmen	15	45	.250	23.5

=== Game log ===
#	Date	Opponent	Score	High points	Record
1	November 2	Pittsburgh	W 56–51	Logan, Putman (12)	1–0
2	November 5	@ Detroit	W 53–49	John Barr (12)	2–0
3	November 7	New York	L 63–68	Don Putman (17)	2–1
4	November 9	Washington	W 70–69	Cecil Hankins (18)	3–1
5	November 14	Boston	W 64–62 (OT)	Logan, Putman (14)	4–1
6	November 16	Cleveland	W 83–74 (OT)	Don Putman (16)	5–1
7	November 19	@ Philadelphia	W 66–63	Cecil Hankins (14)	6–1
8	November 20	@ Washington	L 51–54	John Logan (14)	6–2
9	November 21	@ Boston	W 65–53	George Munroe (16)	7–2
10	November 23	@ Providence	L 65–59	Cecil Hankins (18)	8–2
11	November 27	@ New York	L 60–67	Cecil Hankins (18)	8–3
12	November 28	@ Chicago	W 75–72	John Logan (21)	9–3
13	November 30	Detroit	W 60–57 (OT)	Don Putman (13)	10–3
14	December 5	Pittsburgh	W 66–55	Hankins, Logan (15)	11–3
15	December 7	Philadelphia	L 47–57	John Logan (17)	11–4
16	December 10	@ Cleveland	W 62–61 (OT)	Aubrey Davis (15)	12–4
17	December 12	Chicago	L 68–88	Hankins (18)	12–5
18	December 15	Toronto	L 46–50	John Logan (9)	12–6
19	December 16	@ Pittsburgh	W 66–55	John Logan (11)	13–6
20	December 18	@ Washington	L 47–68	George Munroe (10)	13–7
21	December 19	@ Boston	W 76–74	Bob Doll (22)	14–7
22	December 22	Boston	W 65–53	John Logan (15)	15–7
23	December 26	Detroit	W 55–51	Barr, Munroe (10)	16–7
24	December 29	Philadelphia	W 75–68	John Logan (27)	17–7
25	December 31	@ Cleveland	W 68–59	John Logan (15)	18–7
26	January 1	@ Chicago	W 103–90	Davis, Munroe, Putman (15)	19–7
27	January 2	Washington	W 66–57	John Logan (17)	20–7
28	January 5	New York	L 57–59	George Munroe (15)	20–8
29	January 9	Chicago	W 84–81	Bob Doll (22)	21–8
30	January 12	Pittsburgh	W 72–59	Giff Roux (24)	22–8
31	January 16	Cleveland	L 59–63	Bob Doll (20)	22–9
32	January 19	Providence	W 69–53	John Logan (13)	23–9
33	January 21	@ Toronto	L 71–72	John Logan (14)	23–10
34	January 26	Detroit	W 71–66	John Logan (17)	24–10
35	January 30	Providence	L 70–82	Logan, Putman (12)	24–11
36	February 1	Cleveland	W 70–48	John Barr (13)	25–11
37	February 3	@ Pittsburgh	L 63–68	Munroe, Putman (13)	25–12
38	February 5	@ New York	W 71–46	John Logan (16)	26–12
39	February 6	@ Providence	W 73–65	John Logan (18)	27–12
40	February 8	Washington	L 65–68	Don Martin (12)	27–13
41	February 11	@ Philadelphia	L 59–75	Bob Doll (16)	27–14
42	February 13	@ Boston	L 54–64	John Logan (12)	27–15
43	February 16	Toronto	W 80–64	John Logan (15)	28–15
44	February 18	@ Toronto	L 57–65	Bob Doll (17)	28–16
45	February 21	Chicago	W 65–60	Bob Doll (16)	29–16
46	February 23	Philadelphia	W 71–66	John Logan (17)	30–16
47	February 25	@ Cleveland	W 96–76	Belus Smawley (23)	31–16
48	February 26	@ Philadelphia	L 65–75	Belus Smawley (18)	31–17
49	March 2	@ Chicago	L 86–98	George Munroe (20)	31–18
50	March 3	Providence	W 71–70 (OT)	John Logan (22)	32–18
51	March 8	@ Washington	L 73–74	John Logan (21)	32–19
52	March 11	@ Toronto	L 71–79	Bob Doll (16)	32–20
53	March 13	@ New York	L 74–78 (2OT)	Baltimore, Roux (13)	32–21
54	March 15	@ Providence	L 56–60	Don Putman (15)	32–22
55	March 18	@ Detroit	W 68–59	Logan, Smawley (16)	33–22
56	March 19	@ Pittsburgh	W 79–54	Belus Smawley (16)	34–22
57	March 20	New York	W 51–49	Belus Smawley (18)	35–22
58	March 23	Toronto	W 60–40	Belus Smawley (10)	36–22
59	March 26	@ Detroit	W 67–63	Bob Doll (15)	37–22
60	March 29	Boston	W 59–55	John Logan (18)	38–22
61	March 31	@ Chicago	L 66–73 (OT)	Belus Smawley (17)	38–23

== BAA Playoffs ==
1947 playoff game log
BAA Quarterfinals: 1–2 (home: 1–1; road: 0–1)

Game	Date	Team	Score	High points	High rebounds	High assists	Location Attendance	Series
1	April 2	@ Philadelphia	68–73	George Munroe & Johnny Logan (16)			Philadelphia Arena	0–1
2	April 5	Philadelphia	73–51	Belus Smawley (17)			St. Louis Arena	1–1
3	April 6	Philadelphia	59–75	Belus Smawley (21)			St. Louis Arena	1–2

== Season losses ==
Throughout this season, the St. Louis Bombers only had an average total of 3,120 paid attendees per game, with net receipts totaling up to $113,808 for the season and estimated losses totaling up to around only $75,000 for this season, which would become one of the lower amount of losses by a BAA team during this season. As a result of this combined with the Bombers' performance throughout the season, St. Louis would be one of six teams to fully confirm their interest in staying on board for another season while playing in the BAA. However, despite their promising performance from this season, the Bombers would continue to play for the BAA/NBA up until 1950 before folding operations for good, with their folding occurring on the same day that three other NBA teams (the original Denver Nuggets, the Sheboygan Red Skins, and the Waterloo Hawks, all from the originally rivaling National Basketball League) would not only depart from the NBA, but also create a rivaling professional basketball league alongside the previously folded Anderson Packers (who were also from the NBL's end) called the National Professional Basketball League (NPBL) in an attempt to cut against the NBA's revenue stream during that period of time. St. Louis' folding would be the fifth NBA team that season to fold operations, with the Chicago Stags (planning to operate under the Chicago Bruins name at the time) being the sixth team to fold operations before the 1950–51 NBA season began and the Washington Capitols (the final, original BAA team to fold operations from the present-day) being the seventh and final team to fold operations while the 1950–51 NBA season was actually operating properly, making those three teams the final, original BAA teams to fold operations entirely.
