= Senator Munroe =

Senator Munroe may refer to:

- Allen Munroe (1819–1884), New York State Senate
- George H. Munroe (1844–1912), Illinois State Senate
- James Munroe (New York politician) (1815–1869), New York State Senate

== See also ==
- Senator Monroe (disambiguation)
