= John Barr (basketball) =

American basketball player

Personal information
- Born: August 18, 1918 Shamokin, Pennsylvania
- Died: July 1, 2002 (aged 83)
- Listed height: 6 ft 3 in (1.91 m)
- Listed weight: 205 lb (93 kg)

Career information
- High school: Shamokin (Shamokin, Pennsylvania)
- College: Penn State (1938–1941)
- Playing career: 1945–1949
- Position: Forward
- Number: 8, 13

Career history

Playing
- 1945–1946: Wilmington Bombers
- 1946–1947: St. Louis Bombers
- 1947–1948: Wilkes-Barre Barons
- 1948–1949: Sunbury Mercuries

Coaching
- 1948–1949: Sunbury Mercuries
- 1957–1969: Susquehanna

Career highlights
- Third-team All-American – Converse (1941)
- Stats at NBA.com
- Stats at Basketball Reference

John Evans Barr (August 8, 1918 – July 1, 2002) was an American professional basketball player and coach. He played college basketball for the Penn State Nittany Lions.

Barr played for the St. Louis Bombers of the Basketball Association of America (BAA) for 58 games during the 1946–47 season. He was player-coach for the Sunbury Mercuries of the Eastern Professional Basketball League (EPBL) during the 1948–49 season. He led the Mercuries to a 9–21 record during his only season as head coach of the team.

Barr served as head coach of the Susquehanna River Hawks men's basketball team from 1957 to 1969, compiling a 107–115 record.

He is credited for having the first buzzer-beating game winner in the history of the league that is now the NBA.

== BAA career statistics ==
Legend
GP	Games played
FG%	Field-goal percentage
FT%	Free-throw percentage
APG	Assists per game
PPG	Points per game

=== Regular season ===
Year	Team	GP	FG%	FT%	APG	PPG
1946–47	St. Louis	58	.283	.595	.9	5.1
Career		58	.283	.595	.9	5.1
