= Forrest Sprowl =

American basketball player and coach

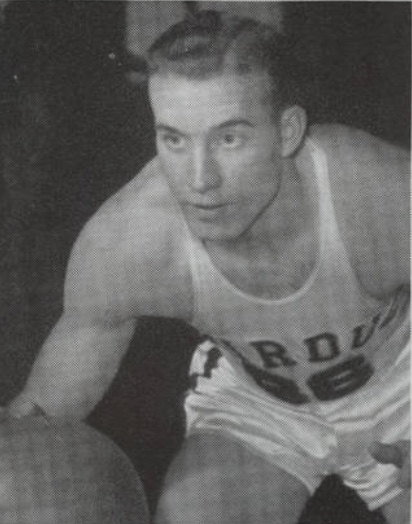
- Sprowl as a senior at Purdue

Personal information
- Born: August 23, 1919 Huntington, Indiana, U.S.
- Died: October 19, 1988 (aged 69) Appleton, Wisconsin, U.S.
- Listed height: 6 ft 0 in (1.83 m)
- Listed weight: 175 lb (79 kg)

Career information
- High school: Oblong (Oblong, Illinois)
- College: Purdue (1939–1942)
- Position: Small forward
- Coaching career: 1946–1955

Career history

Playing
- 1942: Chicago Bruins

Coaching
- 1946–1947: Oblong HS
- 1947–1951: Monticello HS
- 1951–1955: Lawrence

Career highlights
- Second-team All-American – Converse (1942); First-team All-Big Ten (1942)

Career coaching record
- College: 40–33 (.548)

Forrest Henry "Frosty" Sprowl (August 23, 1919 – October 19, 1988) was an American basketball player and coach. An All-American college player at Purdue, he was a head coach at the college level at Lawrence.

Sprowl came to Purdue University from Oblong, Illinois to play for coach Ward Lambert. During the course of his three-year varsity career he was twice named Purdue MVP and earned All-Big Ten Conference honors as a senior. At the close of the season he was named a second-team All-American by Converse.

Following the close of his college career, Sprowl enlisted in the Navy and played with the Great Lakes Naval Training Station under Tony Hinkle. Upon returning to civilian life, he turned to high school coaching, first for his alma mater Oblong High School for a year and then to Monticello High School in Indiana for four seasons. He was then named head basketball coach at Lawrence College (now Lawrence University) in 1951, also taking on assistant football and head tennis coaching duties. He coached at Lawrence for four seasons before resigning for a corporate job.

Sprowl died on October 21, 1988.
