= Herschel Baltimore =

American basketball player

Personal information
- Born: June 21, 1921 Duryea, Pennsylvania
- Died: January 1, 1968 (aged 46)
- Listed height: 6 ft 4 in (1.93 m)
- Listed weight: 195 lb (88 kg)

Career information
- High school: New Castle (New Castle, Pennsylvania)
- College: Penn State (1940–1943)
- Playing career: 1946–1950
- Position: Forward
- Number: 6

Career history
- 1946–1947: St. Louis Bombers
- 1947–1950: Wilkes-Barre Barons
- Stats at NBA.com
- Stats at Basketball Reference

Herschel David "Herk" Baltimore (June 21, 1921 – January 1, 1968) was an American professional basketball player.

Baltimore played college basketball for the Penn State Nittany Lions. He served in World War II and received the Bronze Star Medal.

Baltimore played for the St. Louis Bombers of the Basketball Association of America (BAA) for 58 games during the 1946–47 season. He played for the Wilkes-Barre Barons of the American Basketball League (ABL) from 1947 to 1950.

Baltimore was inducted into the Lawrence County Historical Society Hall of Fame in 2002.

== BAA career statistics ==
Legend
GP	Games played
FG%	Field-goal percentage
FT%	Free-throw percentage
APG	Assists per game
PPG	Points per game

=== Regular season ===
Year	Team	GP	FG%	FT%	APG	PPG
1946–47	St. Louis	58	.202	.464	.3	2.4
Career		58	.202	.464	.3	2.4

=== Playoffs ===
Year	Team	GP	FG%	FT%	APG	PPG
1947	St. Louis	3	.200	.000	.0	1.3
Career		3	.200	.000	.0	1.3
