= Aubrey Davis =

American basketball player (1921–1996)

Personal information
- Born: March 28, 1921 Apache, Oklahoma, U.S.
- Died: November 23, 1996 (aged 75)
- Listed height: 6 ft 2 in (1.88 m)
- Listed weight: 175 lb (79 kg)

Career information
- College: Oklahoma Baptist (1940–1942); East Central (1942–1943)
- Playing career: 1946–1949
- Position: Guard / forward
- Number: 10, 9

Career history
- 1946–1947: St. Louis Bombers
- 1947–1948: Oklahoma City Drillers
- 1948–1949: Hammond Calumet Buccaneers
- Stats at NBA.com
- Stats at Basketball Reference

Aubrey D. Davis (March 28, 1921 – November 23, 1996) was an American professional basketball player. He spent one season in the Basketball Association of America (BAA) with the St. Louis Bombers during the 1946–47 season. He attended Oklahoma Baptist University and East Central State Normal School.

== BAA career statistics ==
Legend
GP	Games played
FG%	Field-goal percentage
FT%	Free-throw percentage
APG	Assists per game
PPG	Points per game

=== Regular season ===
Year	Team	GP	FG%	FT%	APG	PPG
1946–47	St. Louis	59	.281	.635	.2	4.9
Career		59	.281	.635	.2	4.9

=== Playoffs ===
Year	Team	GP	FG%	FT%	APG	PPG
1947	St. Louis	3	.333	1.000	.0	2.3
Career		3	.333	1.000	.0	2.3
