= Fred Jacobs =

American basketball player

Personal information
- Born: December 2, 1922 Joliet, Illinois, U.S.
- Died: October 19, 2008 (aged 85) Golden, Colorado, U.S.
- Listed height: 6 ft 3 in (1.91 m)
- Listed weight: 175 lb (79 kg)

Career information
- College: Denver (1940–1943, 1945–1946)
- Position: Forward
- Number: 4, 12

Career history
- 1946: St. Louis Bombers
- Stats at NBA.com
- Stats at Basketball Reference

Winfred O. "Fred" Jacobs (December 2, 1922 – October 19, 2008) was an American professional basketball player. He played in 16 games for the Basketball Association of America's St. Louis Bombers during the first half of the 1946–47 season. Jacobs played college basketball for the Denver Pioneers.

== BAA career statistics ==
Legend
GP	Games played
FG%	Field-goal percentage
FT%	Free-throw percentage
APG	Assists per game
PPG	Points per game

=== Regular season ===
Year	Team	GP	FG%	FT%	APG	PPG
1946–47	St. Louis	18	.275	.480	.3	2.8
Career		18	.275	.480	.3	2.8
