= Cecil Hankins =

American basketball player (1922–2002)

Personal information
- Born: January 6, 1922 Covin, Alabama, U.S.
- Died: June 3, 2002 (aged 80)
- Listed height: 6 ft 1 in (1.85 m)
- Listed weight: 175 lb (79 kg)

Career information
- High school: Zaneis Consolidated School (Ardmore, Oklahoma)
- College: Southeastern Oklahoma State (1941–1944); Oklahoma State (1944–1945)
- Position: Guard
- Number: 9, 11, 5

Career history
- 1946–1947: St. Louis Bombers
- 1947–1948: Boston Celtics

Career highlights
- NCAA champion (1945)
- Stats at NBA.com
- Stats at Basketball Reference

Cecil Orgus Hankins (January 6, 1922 – June 3, 2002) was an American professional basketball and football player who played for the St. Louis Bombers and Boston Celtics in the Basketball Association of America prior to the formation of the NBA.

Hankins was a four-sport star at Zaneis Consolidated School and attended Oklahoma A&M (now Oklahoma State University). After playing basketball and running track as a freshman, Hankins transferred to Southeastern Oklahoma State University where he starred in basketball and football before returning to Oklahoma State for his senior year. In that year, Hankins was a key player for Henry Iba's 1945 national championship team, averaging 13.3 points for the Aggies. Hankins also starred on the gridiron, starting at halfback for the 1945 Cotton Bowl champions.

Following the close of his collegiate career, Cecil Hankins weighed opportunities in both professional football (with the Boston Yanks) and basketball. He ultimately chose basketball, signing with the St. Louis Bombers of the BAA. Hankins played two seasons in the league, with the Bombers and the Boston Celtics. He averaged 4.9 points per game in 80 contests.

After his professional career ended, Hankins became a basketball and football coach at Sand Springs High School. He also officiated basketball and football games at the collegiate level. He retired as director of athletics at Sand Springs in 1988. Cecil Hankins died on June 3, 2002.

== BAA career statistics ==
Legend
GP	Games played	FG%	Field-goal percentage
FT%	Free-throw percentage	APG	Assists per game
PPG	Points per game	**Bold**	Career high

=== Regular season ===
Year	Team	GP	FG%	FT%	APG	PPG
1946–47	St. Louis	**55**	**.299**	.600	**.3**	**5.9**
1947–48	Boston	25	.198	**.686**	**.3**	2.8
Career		80	.276	.616	.3	4.9

=== Playoffs ===
Year	Team	GP	FG%	FT%	APG	PPG
1947	St. Louis	2	.286	.500	.0	2.5
Career		2	.286	.500	.0	2.5
