= 1942 NCAA Men's Basketball All-Americans =

- Awarded for: 1941–42 NCAA men's basketball season

The consensus 1942 College Basketball All-American team, as determined by aggregating the results of four major All-American teams. To earn "consensus" status, a player must win honors from a majority of the following teams: the Helms Athletic Foundation, Converse, Madison Square Garden, and Pic Magazine.

== 1942 Consensus All-America team ==
Consensus First Team
Player	Class	Team
Price Brookfield	Senior	West Texas State
Bob Davies	Senior	Seton Hall
Bob Kinney	Senior	Rice
John Kotz	Junior	Wisconsin
Andy Phillip	Sophomore	Illinois

Consensus Second Team
Player	Class	Team
Don Burness	Senior	Stanford
Gus Doerner	Senior	Evansville
Bob Doll	Senior	Colorado
John Mandic	Senior	Oregon State
Stan Modzelewski	Senior	Rhode Island State
George Munroe	Junior	Dartmouth

== Individual All-America teams ==
All-America Team
All-America Team	First team		Second team		Third team	
All-America Team	Player	School	Player	School	Player	School
Helms	Price Brookfield	West Texas State	No second or third teams			
Helms	Ray Evans	Kansas	No second or third teams			
Helms	Scotty Hamilton	West Virginia	No second or third teams			
Helms	Bob Kinney	Rice	No second or third teams			
Helms	John Kotz	Wisconsin	No second or third teams			
Helms	Bud Millikan	Oklahoma A&M	No second or third teams			
Helms	Stan Modzelewski	Rhode Island State	No second or third teams			
Helms	George Munroe	Dartmouth	No second or third teams			
Helms	Andy Phillip	Illinois	No second or third teams			
Helms	Jim Pollard	Stanford	No second or third teams			
Converse	Price Brookfield	West Texas State	Bob Davies	Seton Hall	Bob Faught	Notre Dame
Converse	Gus Doerner	Evansville	Bob Gerber	Toledo	Charles Halbert	West Texas State
Converse	Bob Kinney	Rice	Stan Modzelewski	Rhode Island State	Red Holzman	CCNY
Converse	John Kotz	Wisconsin	George Munroe	Dartmouth	Andy Phillip	Illinois
Converse	John Mandic	Oregon State	Forrest Sprowl	Purdue	Andy Zimmer	Indiana
Pic Magazine	Price Brookfield	West Texas State	Bob Davies	Seton Hall	No third team	
Pic Magazine	Don Burness	Stanford	Bob Gerber	Toledo	No third team	
Pic Magazine	Bob Doll	Colorado	Dick Holub	Long Island	No third team	
Pic Magazine	Bob Kinney	Rice	Dick Mehen	Tennessee	No third team	
Pic Magazine	John Kotz	Wisconsin	Andy Phillip	Illinois	No third team	
Madison Square Garden	Price Brookfield	West Texas State	Bob Davies	Seton Hall	No third team	
Madison Square Garden	Bob Faught	Notre Dame	Bob Doll	Colorado	No third team	
Madison Square Garden	Leason McCloud	Colorado	Bob Kinney	Rice	No third team	
Madison Square Garden	Stan Modzelewski	Rhode Island State	Jack Maddox	West Texas State	No third team	
Madison Square Garden	Bart Quinn	Toledo	Bill Rutledge	Rhode Island State	No third team	

== See also ==
- 1941–42 NCAA men's basketball season
