= Senator Monroe (disambiguation) =

James Monroe (1758–1831) was a U.S. Senator from Virginia from 1790 to 1794. Senator Monroe may also refer to:

- James Monroe (Ohio politician) (1821–1898), Ohio State Senate
- James O. Monroe (1888–1968), Illinois State Senate
- Jeff Monroe (born 1956), South Dakota State Senate
- Rod Monroe (1942–2026), Oregon State Senate

== See also ==
- Senator Munroe (disambiguation)
