= Bob O'Brien (basketball) =

American basketball player

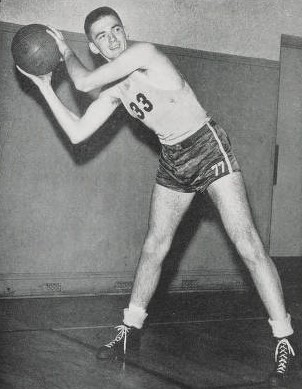
- O'Brien with Pepperdine in 1944

Personal information
- Born: January 26, 1927 Kansas City, Missouri, U.S.
- Died: September 19, 2008 (aged 81) Castle Pines, Colorado, U.S.
- Listed height: 6 ft 4 in (1.93 m)
- Listed weight: 190 lb (86 kg)

Career information
- High school: Westport (Westport, Missouri)
- College: Pepperdine (1944–1945)
- Position: Forward
- Number: 7, 3

Career history
- 1947: Kansas City Blues
- 1947: Elizabeth Braves
- 1947–1948: Philadelphia Warriors
- 1948–1949: St. Louis Bombers
- 1949: Hartford Hurricanes
- 1949: Carbondale Aces
- 1950–1951: Pottsville Packers
- Stats at NBA.com
- Stats at Basketball Reference

Robert Lee O'Brien (January 26, 1927 – September 19, 2008) was an American professional basketball player. He played in the Basketball Association of America for the Philadelphia Warriors and St. Louis Bombers. O'Brien also played in the American Basketball League and Professional Basketball League of America.

== BAA career statistics ==
Legend
GP	Games played	FG%	Field-goal percentage
FT%	Free-throw percentage	APG	Assists per game
PPG	Points per game	**Bold**	Career high

=== Regular season ===
Year	Team	GP	FG%	FT%	APG	PPG
1947–48	Philadelphia	**22**	.210	**.577**	.0	**2.2**
1948–49	Philadelphia	16	.156	.357	**.5**	.9
1948–49	St. Louis	8	**.278**	.389	.1	2.1
Career		46	.206	.466	.2	1.8

=== Playoffs ===
Year	Team	GP	FG%	FT%	APG	PPG
1948	Philadelphia	9	.237	.667	.3	3.1
Career		9	.237	.667	.3	3.1
