= Belus Smawley =

American basketball player and coach (1918–2003)

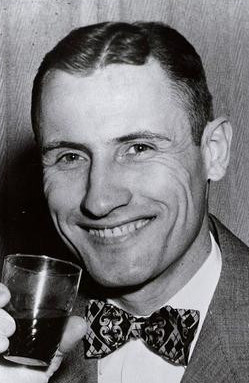
- Smawley in a Bennett's Prune Juice advertisement, c. 1950

Personal information
- Born: March 18, 1918 Golden Valley, North Carolina, U.S.
- Died: April 24, 2003 (aged 85) Mooresville, North Carolina, U.S.
- Listed height: 6 ft 1 in (1.85 m)
- Listed weight: 195 lb (88 kg)

Career information
- High school: Ellenboro (Ellenboro, North Carolina)
- College: Appalachian State (1939–1943)
- Playing career: 1946–1952
- Position: Shooting guard
- Number: 14, 2, 10, 8, 5
- Coaching career: 1951–1956

Career history

Playing
- 1946–1950: St. Louis Bombers
- 1950: Syracuse Nationals
- 1950–1952: Baltimore Bullets

Coaching
- 1942–1943: Appalachian State
- 1951–1956: Pembroke State

Career highlights
- As player: NAIA tournament MVP (1943); As coach: North State Conference champion (1943); North State Conference Coach of the Year (1943)
- Stats at NBA.com
- Stats at Basketball Reference

Career coaching record
- College: 57–58 (.496)

Belus Van Smawley (March 20, 1918 – April 24, 2003) was an American basketball player and coach. He formerly held the record for longest game-winning buzzer-beater in NBA history, hitting one from 50 feet on November 25, 1948.

== Biography ==
A 6'1" guard/forward from Rutherford County, North Carolina, Smawley was one of the first basketball players to regularly use the jump shot. Smawley developed his shot in an abandoned train depot near his home that was fashioned into a basketball court. Basketball historian John Christgau has concluded that Smawley and Kenny Sailors of rural Wyoming were using jump shots as early as 1934.

Smawley was an All-American basketball player at Appalachian State University before becoming one of the early stars of the Basketball Association of America (which became the National Basketball Association in 1949.) From 1946 to 1952, Smawley competed for the St. Louis Bombers, Syracuse Nationals, and Baltimore Bullets, averaging 12.7 points per game. During the 1948–49 BAA season, Smawley ranked sixth in the league in total points and fourth in field goals made.

After his playing career ended, Smawley served as a school principal and basketball coach. Between 1951 and 1956, Smawley served as the athletic director and head men's basketball coach at Pembroke State College, known today as The University of North Carolina at Pembroke, in Pembroke, North Carolina. In December 1951, he took a three-month leave of absence from Pembroke State College to finish his playing career with the Baltimore Bullets. In his absence, Vernon Felton, a member of the Pembroke State faculty and former Appalachian State athlete, led the team to 12 wins and five losses; finishing the season at 12–10. Smawley was inducted into the North Carolina Sports Hall of Fame in 1992.

== BAA/NBA career statistics ==
Legend
| GP | Games played | MPG | Minutes per game |
| FG% | Field-goal percentage | FT% | Free-throw percentage |
| RPG | Rebounds per game | APG | Assists per game |
| PPG | Points per game | **Bold** | Career high |

=== Regular season ===
| Year | Team | GP | MPG | FG% | FT% | RPG | APG | PPG |
|---|---|---|---|---|---|---|---|---|
| 1946–47 | St. Louis | 22 | – | .321 | .766 | – | .5 | 11.9 |
| 1946–47 | St. Louis | 48 | – | .308 | .740 | – | .4 | 11.1 |
| 1948–49 | St. Louis | 59 | – | .372 | .747 | – | 3.1 | **15.5** |
| 1949–50 | St. Louis | **61** | – | .345 | .828 | – | **3.5** | 13.7 |
| 1950–51 | Syracuse | 16 | – | .339 | .815 | **3.0** | 2.3 | 7.8 |
| 1950–51 | Baltimore | 44 | – | **.389** | **.859** | **3.0** | 2.8 | 13.8 |
| 1951–52 | Baltimore | 11 | **12.6** | .206 | .824 | 1.6 | .7 | 3.6 |
| Career | | 261 | 12.6 | .347 | .797 | 2.8 | 2.3 | 12.7 |

=== Playoffs ===
| Year | Team | GP | MPG | FG% | FT% | RPG | APG | PPG |
|---|---|---|---|---|---|---|---|---|
| 1947 | St. Louis | 3 | – | .324 | .545 | – | **.3** | **17.3** |
| 1948 | St. Louis | **6** | – | .302 | **.778** | – | **.3** | 11.0 |
| 1949 | St. Louis | 2 | – | **.417** | .000 | – | .0 | 5.0 |
| Career | | 11 | – | .320 | .690 | – | .3 | 11.6 |

== Head coaching record ==
Record table
| Season | Team | Overall | Conference | Standing | Postseason |
|---|---|---|---|---|---|
Appalachian State Mountaineers (North State Conference) (1942–1943)
| 1942–43 | Appalachian State | 16–5 | 9–0 | 1st | |
| Appalachian State: | | 16–5 | 9–0 | | |
Pembroke State College Braves (Independent) (1951–1956)
| 1951–52 | Pembroke State College | 0–5 | | | |
| 1952–53 | Pembroke State College | 14–9 | | | |
| 1953–54 | Pembroke State College | 6–16 | | | |
| 1954–55 | Pembroke State College | 10–12 | | | |
| 1955–56 | Pembroke State College | 11–11 | | | |
| Pembroke State College: | | 41–53 | | | |
| Total: | | 57–58 | | | |
National champion Postseason invitational champion Conference regular season champion Conference regular season and conference tournament champion Division regular season champion Division regular season and conference tournament champion Conference tournament champion
