= Emory D. Jones =

American sports promoter

Emory Daniel Jones (April 7, 1897 – September 15, 1977) was an American sports promoter who was the manager of the St. Louis Arena for 35 years. In addition to running the arena, Jones also managed a number of its sports teams. He was president of the St. Louis Flyers (American Hockey Association/American Hockey League), vice president and general manager of the St. Louis Braves (Central Hockey League), general manager of the St. Louis Bombers (National Basketball Association), and was a boxing promoter. He also managed the Forest Park Highlands amusement park, which was owned by the St. Louis Arena Corporation. In 1952, Jones was elected president of the American Hockey League. He was reelected in June 1953, but two months later, the Flyers folded and Jones resigned as league president. From 1969 to 1974, Jones was the president of the Central Hockey League. He died on September 15, 1977, at Deaconess Hospital in St. Louis at the age of 80.
