= Giff Roux =

American basketball player

Personal information
- Born: June 28, 1923 Bonne Terre, Missouri, U.S.
- Died: August 19, 2011 (aged 88) Alton, Illinois, U.S.
- Listed height: 6 ft 5 in (1.96 m)
- Listed weight: 195 lb (88 kg)

Career information
- High school: East Alton-Wood River (Wood River, Illinois)
- Playing career: 1946–1949
- Position: Forward

Career history
- 1946–1949: St Louis Bombers
- 1949: Providence Steamrollers
- Stats at NBA.com
- Stats at Basketball Reference

Gifford H. Roux (June 28, 1923 – August 19, 2011) was an American professional basketball player.

A 6'5" forward, Roux attended the University of Kansas but did not play basketball.

Roux played three seasons in the Basketball Association of America (BAA) as a member of the St. Louis Bombers and Providence Steamrollers.

== BAA career statistics ==
Legend
GP	Games played	FG%	Field-goal percentage
FT%	Free-throw percentage	APG	Assists per game
PPG	Points per game	**Bold**	Career high

Year	Team	GP	FG%	FT%	APG	PPG
1946–47	St. Louis	**60**	**.297**	.438	.3	**5.9**
1947–48	St. Louis	46	.264	.588	.3	3.8
1948–49	St. Louis	19	.250	**.882**	**.6**	1.9
1948–49	Providence	26	.243	.519	.3	1.9
Career		151	.280	.511	.3	4.1

=== Playoffs ===
Year	Team	GP	FG%	FT%	APG	PPG
1947	St. Louis	3	**.379**	.000	.0	**7.3**
1948	St. Louis	**5**	.083	**.429**	.0	1.4
Career		8	.245	.333	.0	3.6
