= Don Martin (basketball) =

American basketball player

Personal information
- Born: February 7, 1920 Poplar Bluff, Missouri
- Died: September 30, 1997 (aged 77) Goreville, Illinois
- Listed height: 6 ft 7 in (2.01 m)
- Listed weight: 210 lb (95 kg)

Career information
- College: Central Missouri (1939–1943)
- Position: Forward / center
- Number: 14

Career history
- 1946–1949: St. Louis Bombers
- 1949: Baltimore Bullets

Career highlights
- First-team all-MIAA (1942); Second-team all-MIAA (1941)
- Stats at NBA.com
- Stats at Basketball Reference

James Donald Martin (February 7, 1920 – September 30, 1997) was an American professional basketball player. He played for the Basketball Association of America's St. Louis Bombers and Baltimore Bullets between 1946 and 1949, averaging 3.0 points per game for his career.

Following his college career, Martin obtained a master's degree from Iowa State University. He then became a teacher and basketball coach, first at Effingham High School, then at Central Junior High School in Belleville, Illinois, retiring in 1983.

== BAA career statistics ==
Legend
GP	Games played	FG%	Field-goal percentage
FT%	Free-throw percentage	APG	Assists per game
PPG	Points per game	**Bold**	Career high

=== Regular season ===
Year	Team	GP	FG%	FT%	APG	PPG
1946–47	St. Louis	**54**	.293	.419	.2	**3.5**
1947–48	St. Louis	39	.233	.455	.1	2.2
1948–49	St. Louis	37	**.311**	**.644**	**.6**	**3.5**
1948–49	Baltimore	7	.222	.500	**.6**	.7
Career		137	.282	.523	.3	3.0

=== Playoffs ===
Year	Team	GP	FG%	FT%	APG	PPG
1947	St. Louis	3	.111	**1.000**	**.3**	**3.3**
1948	St. Louis	**5**	**.250**	**1.000**	.2	2.2
Career		8	.161	1.000	.3	2.6
