= Johnny Logan (basketball) =

American basketball player and coach

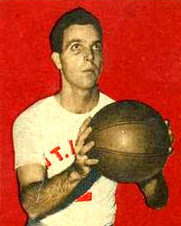
- Logan in 1948

Personal information
- Born: January 1, 1921 Richmond, Indiana, U.S.
- Died: September 16, 1977 (aged 56) Charlotte, North Carolina, U.S.
- Listed height: 6 ft 2 in (1.88 m)
- Listed weight: 175 lb (79 kg)

Career information
- High school: Richmond (Richmond, Indiana)
- College: Indiana (1940–1943)
- Playing career: 1946–1951
- Position: Guard
- Number: 7, 17

Career history

Playing
- 1946–1950: St. Louis Bombers
- 1950–1951: Tri-Cities Blackhawks

Coaching
- 1950: Tri-Cities Blackhawks

Career highlights
- 3× All-BAA Second Team (1947–1949)
- Stats at NBA.com
- Stats at Basketball Reference

John Arnold Logan (January 1, 1921 – September 16, 1977) was an American professional basketball player and coach born in Richmond, Indiana. A 6'2" guard who played at Indiana University, Logan played for four seasons with the now-defunct St. Louis Bombers, and a fifth season with the Tri-Cities Blackhawks. While with the Blackhawks, he served three games as an interim player-coach.

== Career playing statistics ==
Legend
GP	Games played	FG%	Field-goal percentage
FT%	Free-throw percentage	RPG	Rebounds per game
APG	Assists per game	PPG	Points per game
**Bold**	Career high

=== BAA/NBA ===
==== Regular season ====
Year	Team	GP	FG%	FT%	RPG	APG	PPG
1946–47	St. Louis	61	.278	.748	–	1.3	12.6
1947–48	St. Louis	48	.301	.743	–	1.3	13.4
1948–49	St. Louis	57	**.346**	**.791**	–	4.8	**14.1**
1949–50	St. Louis	**62**	.331	.783	–	3.9	12.2
1950–51	Tri-Cities	30	.312	.750	**4.5**	**4.0**	7.7
Career		258	.312	.767	4.5	3.0	12.4

==== Playoffs ====
Year	Team	GP	FG%	FT%	RPG	APG	PPG
1947	St. Louis	3	.222	.733	–	1.0	10.3
1948	St. Louis	**5**	**.309**	**.786**	–	1.6	**11.2**
1949	St. Louis	2	.304	.667	–	**4.0**	10.0
Career		10	.276	.750	–	1.9	10.7

== Head coaching record ==
Legend
Regular season	G	Games coached	W	Games won	L	Games lost	W–L %	Win–loss %
Playoffs	PG	Playoff games	PW	Playoff wins	PL	Playoff losses	PW–L %	Playoff win–loss %

Team	Year	G	W	L	W–L%	Finish	PG	PW	PL	PW–L%	Result
Tri-Cities	1950–51	3	2	1	.667	(replaced)	—	—	—	—	—
