= George Munroe (basketball) =

American lawyer

Personal information
- Born: January 5, 1922 Joliet, Illinois, U.S.
- Died: August 19, 2014 (aged 92)
- Listed height: 5 ft 11 in (1.80 m)
- Listed weight: 170 lb (77 kg)

Career information
- High school: Joliet Township (Joliet, Illinois)
- College: Dartmouth (1940–1943)
- Playing career: 1946–1948
- Position: Guard
- Number: 3, 6

Career history
- 1946–1947: St. Louis Bombers
- 1947–1948: Boston Celtics

Career highlights
- Consensus second-team All-American (1942)

Career statistics
- Points: 485
- Rebounds: Not tracked
- Assists: 20
- Stats at NBA.com
- Stats at Basketball Reference

George Barber Munroe (January 5, 1922 – August 19, 2014) was an American professional basketball player, Navy veteran, Rhodes scholar, lawyer, and former CEO of Phelps Dodge Corporation.

== College ==
Munroe matriculated at Dartmouth College in the fall of 1939. He played on the Big Green basketball team from 1940–41 to 1942–43, where as junior he was honored as a consensus Second Team All-American. A 5 ft 11 in (1.80 m), 170 pounds (77 kg) guard, Munroe guided Dartmouth to the NCAA national title game—the school's first championship appearance—but lost to Stanford, 53–38. They finished the season with a 22–6 overall record, largely led by Munroe, who was the 1941–42 Eastern Intercollegiate Basketball League (Ivy League) scoring champion. In 12 conference games he scored 175 points, good for an average of 14.6 points per game. As a senior in 1942–43, Dartmouth once again reached the NCAA Tournament, but this time lost in the opening round to DePaul, 46–36. They would defeat NYU 51–49 in the East Region consolation game, however, and finish their season with a 20–3 overall record. In the spring of 1943, Munroe graduated from Dartmouth College.

After graduation, Munroe served in the United States Navy from 1943 to 1946.

== Professional basketball career ==
After he was discharged from the Navy, Munroe played for two seasons in the Basketball Association of America (BAA). He spent the 1946–47 season playing for the St. Louis Bombers and the 1947–48 season with the Boston Celtics. In his two professional seasons, Munroe averaged 6.1 points in 80 career games.

== Post-playing career ==
=== Lawyer and Rhodes Scholar ===
When his basketball career ended, he enrolled at Harvard Law School where he earned his LL.B. in 1949. Shortly thereafter, Munroe was admitted to the New York State Bar Association and became associated with the firm of Cravath, Swaine & Moore in New York City. He was only with the firm for a short while before enrolling at Christ Church, Oxford, one of the biggest constituent colleges of the University of Oxford in England.

In 1951, Munroe received his B.A. degree and graduated from Christ Church as a Rhodes scholar. Upon returning to the United States he practiced law for several years, but then returned to Oxford and earned an M.A. from Christ Church in 1956. For the next two years, Munroe practiced law in New York, and then in 1958 he joined Phelps Dodge Corporation, an American mining company.

=== Phelps Dodge Company ===
In 1962, after spending four years with the company, he was appointed vice president, a position which he held for another four years. Then, in 1966, Munroe took control of the company's daily operations when he was promoted to be its president. After making his way to the very top of the company's ladder by becoming the CEO in 1969, he served as the president and CEO concurrently until 1975, at which point Munroe stepped down as president to focus on his duties as the CEO. He finally retired from the mining company in 1987 but still resumed his seat as a Member of the Board for Phelps Dodge. He was on the Board from 1966 to 1994 and acted as its chairman from 1975 to 1987.

=== Dartmouth service ===
Although Munroe graduated from Dartmouth College in 1943, he retained a lifelong dedication to the institution. From 1959 to 1964 he was a Class Agent and was awarded the Hood Trophy in 1964 for his efforts. From 1964 to 1968, Munroe was a member of the Alumni Council and the Class Executive Committee, and in 1977, was elected to the Dartmouth College Board of Trustees. In 1988 he became the Chairman of the Board of Trustees but only served for three years amid a turbulent time in Dartmouth's alumni dissatisfaction. In August 2001, George Munroe donated his papers from his time as the Board Chairman to the Dartmouth College Library for historical archiving purposes.

== Personal life ==
Munroe was born in Joliet, Illinois. He attended Joliet Township High School and graduated from there in 1939. Munroe's father was George Muller Munroe and his mother was Ruth Barber. He had two sons, George Taylor and Ralph W. Taylor, by his first wife Helen Taylor. They were married from June 22, 1945, until getting divorced in 1964. Munroe remarried on May 30, 1968, to Elinor Bunin. He died in August 2014 at the age of 92.

== BAA career statistics ==
Legend
GP	Games played	FG%	Field-goal percentage
FT%	Free-throw percentage	APG	Assists per game
PPG	Points per game	**Bold**	Career high

=== Regular season ===
Year	Team	GP	FG%	FT%	APG	PPG
1946–47	St. Louis	**59**	.263	.647	**.3**	**7.0**
1947–48	Boston	21	**.297**	**.654**	.1	3.4
Career		80	.268	.648	.3	6.1

=== Playoffs ===
Year	Team	GP	FG%	FT%	APG	PPG
1947	St. Louis	**3**	**.484**	.571	.0	**11.3**
1948	Boston	**3**	.200	**1.000**	**.3**	1.3
Career		6	.444	.667	.2	6.3
