= Don Putman =

American basketball player

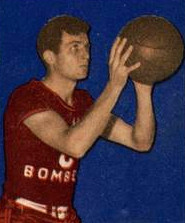
- Putman in 1948

Personal information
- Born: November 13, 1922 Wray, Colorado, U.S.
- Died: June 26, 2006 (aged 83)
- Listed height: 6 ft 1 in (1.85 m)
- Listed weight: 170 lb (77 kg)

Career information
- High school: Boulder Prep (Boulder, Colorado)
- College: Colorado (1941–1946)
- Position: Guard
- Number: 13, 8

Career history
- 1946–1950: St. Louis Bombers
- Stats at NBA.com
- Stats at Basketball Reference

James Donald Putman (November 13, 1922 – June 26, 2006) was an American professional basketball player who spent three seasons in the Basketball Association of America (BAA) and one season in the National Basketball Association (NBA) as a member of the St. Louis Bombers. He attended the University of Colorado.

== BAA/NBA career statistics ==
Legend
GP	Games played	FG%	Field-goal percentage
FT%	Free-throw percentage	APG	Assists per game
PPG	Points per game	**Bold**	Career high

=== Regular season ===
Year	Team	GP	FG%	FT%	APG	PPG
1946–47	St. Louis	58	.246	.648	.5	**6.6**
1947–48	St. Louis	42	.263	**.679**	.6	6.4
1948–49	St. Louis	**59**	**.297**	.536	**2.4**	4.2
1949–50	St. Louis	57	.262	.635	1.6	2.4
Career		216	.262	.621	1.3	4.8

=== Playoffs ===
Year	Team	GP	FG%	FT%	APG	PPG
1947	St. Louis	3	**.292**	.250	.3	**5.0**
1948	St. Louis	**7**	.182	**.583**	.7	3.3
1949	St. Louis	2	.182	.000	**2.0**	2.0
Career		12	.215	.421	.8	3.5
