= Deb Smith =

American basketball player

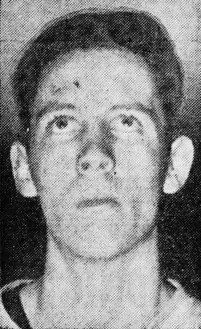
- Smith, circa 1942

Personal information
- Born: January 7, 1920 Paul, Idaho, U.S.
- Died: February 25, 2009 (aged 89) Salt Lake City, Utah, U.S.
- Listed height: 6 ft 3 in (1.91 m)
- Listed weight: 180 lb (82 kg)

Career information
- High school: West (Salt Lake City, Utah)
- College: Utah (1939–1942)
- Playing career: 1946–1947
- Position: Forward
- Number: 10, 11

Career history
- 1946–1947: St. Louis Bombers
- Stats at NBA.com
- Stats at Basketball Reference

Delbert Bower "Deb" Smith (January 7, 1920 – February 25, 2009) was an American professional basketball player. He played for the St. Louis Bombers in the 1946–47 Basketball Association of America season. It was the first year of the league's existence. The BAA existed for three years before merging with the National Basketball League to become the National Basketball Association.

Smith played in 48 games and averaged 1.5 points per game.

== BAA career statistics ==
Legend
GP	Games played
FG%	Field-goal percentage
FT%	Free-throw percentage
APG	Assists per game
PPG	Points per game

=== Regular season ===
Year	Team	GP	FG%	FT%	APG	PPG
1946–47	St. Louis	48	.269	.429	.1	1.5
Career		48	.269	.429	.1	1.5

=== Playoffs ===
Year	Team	GP	FG%	FT%	APG	PPG
1947	St. Louis	1	.000	.000	.000	.000
Career		1	.000	.000	.000	.000
