= George H. Munroe =

American politician

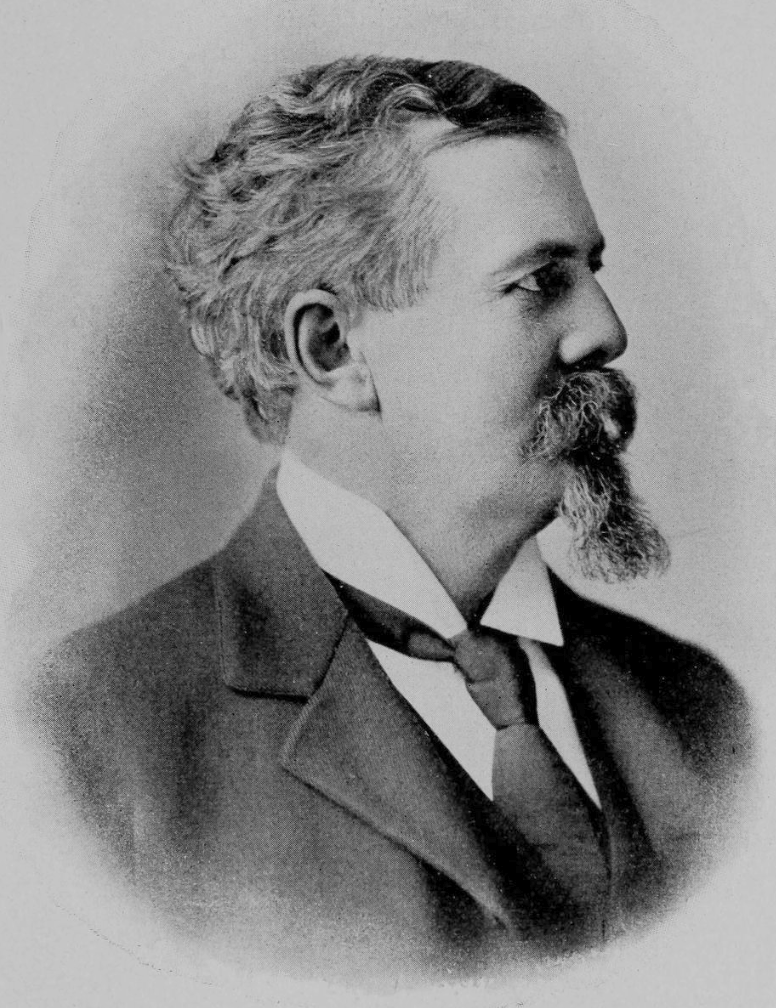

Member of the Illinois Senate
- In office 1895–1899

Personal details
- Born: September 24, 1844 Brownville, New York
- Died: February 1, 1912 (aged 67) Daytona, Florida
- Party: Republican
- Occupation: Businessman, politician
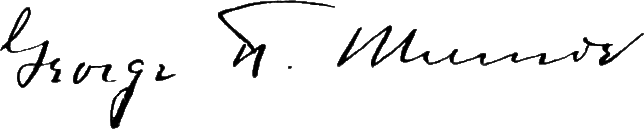
- Signature

George H. Munroe (September 24, 1844 – February 1, 1912) was an American businessman and politician.

== Biography ==
Munroe was born in Brownville, New York on September 24, 1844. In 1849, Munroe moved to Illinois with his parents. He went to the public schools. In 1862, Munroe moved to Joliet, Illinois. He was involved with the grocery business in Joliet. Munroe also was involved in the real estate and mortgage loan business.

Munroe served in the Illinois Senate from 1895 to 1899 and was a Republican.

In later life, Munroe was an orange grower in Florida. He died suddenly from a stroke while he was in his bathroom at his winter home in Daytona.
