= 1947–48 St. Louis Bombers season =

- Division champions
- Head coach: Ken Loeffler
- Arena: St. Louis Arena

Results
- Record: 29–19 (.604)
- Place: Division: 1st (Western)
- Playoff finish: Lost in BAA Semifinals (eliminated 3-4)
- Stats at Basketball Reference

Local media
- Television: KSD-TV
- Radio: WIL

The 1947–48 BAA season was the Bombers' second season in the BAA (which later became the NBA). Entering this season, St. Louis would continue to utilize the coaching system that made head coach Ken Loeffler successful under his first season with the Bombers, which involved a retrogressive philosophy of speedy play on both ends of the court that would make players feel like they wanted to hate their head coach at times. However, this season would be seen as even better for them than their first season was due to them being the only team in the BAA to finish with a record under 20 losses in a season that only had 48 total games played this season with a 29–19 record, which was the best record in the entire BAA and barely earned them the best record in a Western Division that involved tiebreaker rounds throughout the rest of that division otherwise. Despite their success, however, they would be upset in the BAA Semifinals 4–3 by the defending champion Philadelphia Warriors, who themselves were later upset by the eventual champion Baltimore Bullets (who originally defected from the American Basketball League to the BAA starting this season). Following this season's conclusion, Loeffler would resign from his position as head coach on May 28, 1948 due to a dispute with the team's management involving a $1,000 bonus for the work he did in the two seasons he did as the head coach for the team, with his position being replaced by Grady Lewis for the rest of their existence going forward and Loeffler later being a head coach for the Providence Steamrollers in the BAA before eventually finding his best work with La Salle College (now La Salle University).

== Draft ==
Round	Pick	Player	Position	Nationality	College
1	7	Jack Underman	C	United States	Ohio State
2	17	Jack Knopf	G	United States	Louisville
3	27	Herb Wilkinson	G/F	United States	Iowa
4	37	Bob Kurland	C	United States	Oklahoma A&M
5	46	Bill Strannigan	–	United States	Wyoming
6	54	Paul Napolitano	G/F	United States	San Francisco
7	60	Jim Pollard	F/C	United States	Stanford

St. Louis would also later acquire future Hall of Famer Red Rocha from the Toronto Huskies months after the inaugural BAA/NBA draft concluded.

== Roster ==
1947–48 St. Louis Bombers roster
Players

Pos.	No.	Player	Height	Weight	DOB	From
F	9	John Abramovic	6 ft 3 in (1.91 m)	195 lb (88 kg)	1919-02-09	Salem International
F/C	5	Bob Doll	6 ft 5 in (1.96 m)	195 lb (88 kg)	1919-08-10	Colorado
G/F	3	Wyndol Gray	6 ft 1 in (1.85 m)	175 lb (79 kg)	1922-03-20	Harvard
F/C	6	Grady Lewis	6 ft 7 in (2.01 m)	215 lb (98 kg)	1917-03-25	Oklahoma
G	7	Johnny Logan	6 ft 2 in (1.88 m)	175 lb (79 kg)	1921-01-01	Indiana
F/C	14	Don Martin	6 ft 7 in (2.01 m)	210 lb (95 kg)	1920-02-07	Central Missouri
F	11	Ariel Maughan	6 ft 4 in (1.93 m)	190 lb (86 kg)	1923-04-26	Utah State
G	9	Buddy O'Grady	5 ft 11 in (1.80 m)	160 lb (73 kg)	1920-01-19	Georgetown
G	8	Don Putman	6 ft 1 in (1.85 m)	170 lb (77 kg)	1922-11-13	Denver
C	4	Red Rocha	6 ft 9 in (2.06 m)	185 lb (84 kg)	1923-09-18	Oregon State
C	6	Irv Rothenberg	6 ft 7 in (2.01 m)	215 lb (98 kg)	1921-12-31	LIU Brooklyn
F/C	12	Giff Roux	6 ft 5 in (1.96 m)	195 lb (88 kg)	1923-06-28	Kansas
SG	2, 10	Belus Smawley	6 ft 1 in (1.85 m)	195 lb (88 kg)	1918-03-20	Appalachian State

Coaches
Head coach

Ken Loeffler

Legend
- (DP) Unsigned draft pick
- (FA) Free agent
- (S) Suspended
- Injured

Roster

== Regular season ==
=== Season standings ===
#	Western Division				
#	Team	W	L	PCT	GB
1	x-St. Louis Bombers	29	19	.604	–
2	x-Baltimore Bullets	28	20	.583	1
3	x-Chicago Stags	28	20	.583	1
4	x-Washington Capitols	28	20	.583	1

=== Game log ===
#	Date	Opponent	Score	High points	Record
1	November 13	@ Chicago	70–80	Red Rocha (17)	0–1
2	November 15	@ New York	67–73	Red Rocha (26)	0–2
3	November 18	@ Boston	65–50	Logan, Smawley (14)	1–2
4	November 20	Providence	73–67	Red Rocha (16)	2–2
5	November 22	Washington	70–62	Belus Smawley (17)	3–2
6	November 26	@ Washington	64–83	Johnny Logan (16)	3–3
7	November 29	Baltimore	67–71	Red Rocha (24)	3–4
8	December 2	@ Providence	86–66	Don Putman (18)	4–4
9	December 4	@ Baltimore	65–51	Red Rocha (21)	5–4
10	December 8	@ New York	56–71	Red Rocha (14)	5–5
11	December 11	@ Philadelphia	74–69	Belus Smawley (21)	6–5
12	December 12	@ Chicago	85–75	Bob Doll (18)	7–5
13	December 18	@ Baltimore	67–74	Johnny Logan (16)	7–6
14	December 19	@ Boston	70–78	Grady Lewis (13)	7–7
15	December 20	@ Washington	55–52	Belus Smawley (14)	8–7
16	December 25	Washington	56–73	Bob Doll (17)	8–8
17	December 28	Baltimore	67–63	Bob Doll (23)	9–8
18	January 1	Boston	58–48	Johnny Logan (15)	10–8
19	January 4	Philadelphia	80–66	Red Rocha (15)	11–8
20	January 8	Washington	76–73	Don Putman (17)	12–8
21	January 11	Baltimore	69–54	Red Rocha (14)	13–8
22	January 15	New York	55–59	Red Rocha (11)	13–9
23	January 18	Providence	70–61	Johnny Logan (18)	14–9
24	January 20	@ Philadelphia	59–82	Don Putman (10)	14–10
25	January 21	@ Washington	74–81	Johnny Logan (19)	14–11
26	January 22	@ Baltimore	71–68	Doll, Logan, Smawley (11)	15–11
27	January 25	Boston	72–54	Johnny Logan (15)	16–11
28	January 27	@ Providence	94–61	Red Rocha (20)	17–11
29	January 29	Chicago	62–60	Johnny Logan (17)	18–11
30	January 31	Philadelphia	60–66	Bob Doll (17)	18–12
31	February 5	Chicago	71–77	Doll, Smawley (13)	18–13
32	February 7	Philadelphia	67–54	Don Putman (14)	19–13
33	February 11	@ Chicago	80–78	Irv Rothenberg (23)	20–13
34	February 12	Chicago	74–80	Irv Rothenberg (24)	20–14
35	February 15	Baltimore	69–63	Johnny Logan (22)	21–14
36	February 19	Providence	78–69	Red Rocha (20)	22–14
37	February 22	New York	80–71	Red Rocha (19)	23–14
38	February 26	Boston	94–92 (2OT)	Belus Smawley (23)	24–14
39	February 28	Washington	82–61	Logan, Rocha (18)	25–14
40	March 4	@ Baltimore	75–84	Belus Smawley (17)	25–15
41	March 5	@ Boston	68–71	Doll, Logan (14)	25–16
42	March 9	@ Providence	75–69	Red Rocha (19)	26–16
43	March 10	@ New York	82–73	Belus Smawley (20)	27–16
44	March 11	@ Philadelphia	74–92	Ariel Maughan (13)	27–17
45	March 13	@ Washington	69–86	Logan, Rocha, Smawley (13)	27–18
46	March 18	New York	80–91	Belus Smawley (20)	27–19
47	March 20	Chicago	75–63	Logan, Smawley (20)	28–19
48	March 21	@ Chicago	82–70	Red Rocha (19)	29–19

== BAA Playoffs ==
=== BAA Semifinals ===
(W1) St. Louis Bombers vs. (E1) Philadelphia Warriors: Warriors win series 4-3

- Game 1 @ St. Louis (March 23): St. Louis 60, Philadelphia 58
- Game 2 @ St. Louis (March 25): Philadelphia 65, St. Louis 64
- Game 3 @ Philadelphia (March 27): Philadelphia 84, St. Louis 56
- Game 4 @ Philadelphia (March 30): St. Louis 56, Philadelphia 51
- Game 5 @ St. Louis (April 1): St. Louis 69, Philadelphia 62
- Game 6 @ Philadelphia (April 3): Philadelphia 84, St. Louis 61
- Game 7 @ St. Louis (April 6): Philadelphia 85, St. Louis 46
