= Bob Doll =

American basketball player (1919–1959)

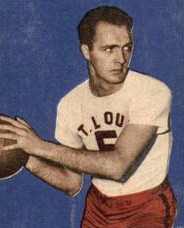
- Doll in 1948

Personal information
- Born: August 10, 1919 Steamboat Springs, Colorado, U.S.
- Died: c. September 7, 1959 (aged 40) Rabbit Ears Pass, Colorado, U.S.
- Listed height: 6 ft 5 in (1.96 m)
- Listed weight: 195 lb (88 kg)

Career information
- High school: Chaffey (Ontario, California)
- College: Colorado (1939–1942)
- Playing career: 1946–1950
- Position: Forward / center
- Number: 5, 19

Career history
- 1946–1948: St. Louis Bombers
- 1948–1950: Boston Celtics

Career highlights
- Consensus second-team All-American (1942); National Invitation Tournament MVP (1940)

Career statistics
- Points: 1,653
- Rebounds: Not tracked
- Assists: 273
- Stats at NBA.com
- Stats at Basketball Reference

Robert W. Doll (August 10, 1919 – c. September 7, 1959) was an American professional basketball player who played in the early days of professional basketball for the St. Louis Bombers and Boston Celtics during the early years of the NBA.

== College and amateur career ==
Doll starred at Chaffey High School in Ontario, California and played collegiately at the University of Colorado from 1939 to 1942, leading the Buffaloes to a period of great team success. A 6 ft 5 in (1.96 m) post player, "Ichabod" Doll was known as a voracious rebounder and defender with a soft shooting touch. In his first season of eligibility as a sophomore in 1940, Doll led the Buffaloes to bids in both the NCAA Tournament and NIT. While the NCAA tournament appearance lasted only one game, Doll led the Buffs to the NIT title and was named the tournament Most Valuable Player after averaging 15.5 points per game. Two years later, Doll was named a consensus second team All-American and led Colorado to its first Final Four.

Following the close of his collegiate career, Doll played for several years in the Amateur Athletic Union and was named an AAU All-American in 1943 while playing for the Denver American Legion team.

== Professional career ==
In 1946, Doll joined the St. Louis Bombers of the Basketball Association of America (BAA). After two years with the Bombers, Doll joined the Boston Celtics as a free agent. During his two-year stint with the Celtics, the BAA merged with the National Basketball League to form the National Basketball Association. Doll played for one more year with the Celtics in the inaugural NBA campaign. Bob Doll averaged 8.4 points and 1.4 assists per game for his four-year BAA/NBA career.

== Death ==
Doll was found shot to death on September 18, 1959, on Rabbit Ears Pass in the Rocky Mountains of Colorado. A .45 caliber pistol he owned was discovered near his body and his death was determined to be a suicide. Doll had vanished on Labor Day but had not been reported missing until five days before the discovery of his body. The coroner determined that he likely died sometime around the Labor Day weekend.

== BAA/NBA career statistics ==
Legend
GP	Games played	FG%	Field-goal percentage
FT%	Free-throw percentage	APG	Assists per game
PPG	Points per game	**Bold**	Career high

=== Regular season ===
Year	Team	GP	FG%	FT%	APG	PPG
1946–47	St. Louis	**60**	.253	.650	.4	8.7
1947–48	St. Louis	42	.264	.662	.6	**10.6**
1948–49	Boston	47	.331	**.684**	**2.5**	7.9
1949–50	Boston	47	**.346**	.658	2.3	6.7
Career		196	.286	.662	1.4	8.4

=== Playoffs ===
Year	Team	GP	FG%	FT%	APG	PPG
1947	St. Louis	3	.154	**.667**	.0	6.7
1948	St. Louis	**7**	**.198**	.538	**.7**	**7.1**
Career		10	.185	.579	.5	7.1

== See also ==
- List of solved missing person cases: 1950–1999
