= St. Louis Bombers =

Defunct basketball team (1946–1950)

- Division: Western
- Founded: 1946
- Folded: 1950
- History: St. Louis Bombers; 1946–1950
- Arena: St. Louis Arena
- Location: St. Louis, Missouri
- Team colors: Red and White
- General manager: Emory D. Jones
- Head coach: Ken Loeffler (1946–1948); Grady Lewis (1948–1950)
- Division titles: 1 (1948)

The St. Louis Bombers were a National Basketball Association team based in St. Louis from 1946 to 1950.

== Franchise history ==
The St. Louis Bombers were originally part of the Basketball Association of America (BAA) in 1946. Ken Loeffler, head coach at the University of Denver, was the team's first head coach. He left the team in 1948 due to a disagreement with team president C. D. Hamilton Jr. over a bonus.

On May 7, 1949, the Bombers signed Saint Louis University star Ed Macauley to one of the highest contracts in professional basketball. Later that year, the BAA merged with the National Basketball League (NBL) to form the National Basketball Association (NBA).

On January 27, 1950, general manager Emory D. Jones announced that the ownership was looking to sell the team due to poor on-court performance and low attendance (3,550 per game). On April 22, 1950, the Bombers announced that they were dropping their franchise. The Bombers were one of six teams that either folded or departed the NBA after the 1949–50 season.

The NBA would return to St. Louis in 1955 when the Milwaukee Hawks relocated and became the St. Louis Hawks. Ed Macauley would end up back in St. Louis in a deal that sent Bill Russell to the Boston Celtics, and played a key role in the Hawks 1958 NBA championship. The Hawks have played in their current home of Atlanta since 1968.

== Arena ==
The Bombers played at the St. Louis Arena. The arena was torn down in 1999.

== Notable alumni ==
=== Naismith Basketball Hall of Fame ===
St. Louis Bombers Hall of Famers
Players
No.	Name	Position	Tenure	Inducted
50	Ed Macauley	C/F	1949–1950	1960
Coaches
Name		Position	Tenure	Inducted
Ken Loeffler		Head coach	1946-1948	1964

== Season-by-season record ==
BAA/NBA champions	Division champions	Playoff berth

Season	League	Division	Finish	Wins	Losses	Win%	GB	Playoffs	Awards
1946–47	BAA	Western	2nd	38	23	.623	1	Lost First round (Warriors) 1–2	
1947–48	BAA	Western	1st	29	19	.604	—	Lost BAA Semifinals (Warriors) 3–4 †	
1948–49	BAA	Western	4th	29	31	.483	16	Lost Division semifinals (Royals) 0–2 ‡	
1949–50	NBA	Central	5th	26	42	.382	25		
Regular season record				122	115	.515	1946–1950		
Playoff record				4	8	.333	Postseason Series Record: 0–3		

- † The 1948 BAA Playoffs did not establish Eastern and Western finalists and generated one finalist from the East, one from the West, only by coincidence. Philadelphia and St. Louis were the finalists from the Eastern and Western divisions and met in a best-of-seven series to determine one league championship finalist.
- ‡ The 1949 BAA Playoffs matched Eastern teams exclusively, and Western teams exclusively, so that the league semifinals generated Eastern and Western finalists as well as championship finalists.
