= List of NBA career personal fouls leaders =

This is a list of National Basketball Association (NBA) players by total career regular season personal fouls recorded, followed by a progressive list of personal fouls leaders showing how the record increased through the years. Kareem Abdul-Jabbar holds the career record with 4,657 personal fouls, while Darryl Dawkins holds the single-season record with 386 in the 1983–84 season.

Color and symbol legend
^	Active NBA player
*	Inducted into the Naismith Memorial Basketball Hall of Fame
†	Not yet eligible for Hall of Fame consideration (Note: A player is not eligible for induction into the Naismith Memorial Basketball Hall of Fame until he has been fully retired for two calendar years.)
§	Eligible for Hall of Fame in 2027

== Personal fouls leaders ==
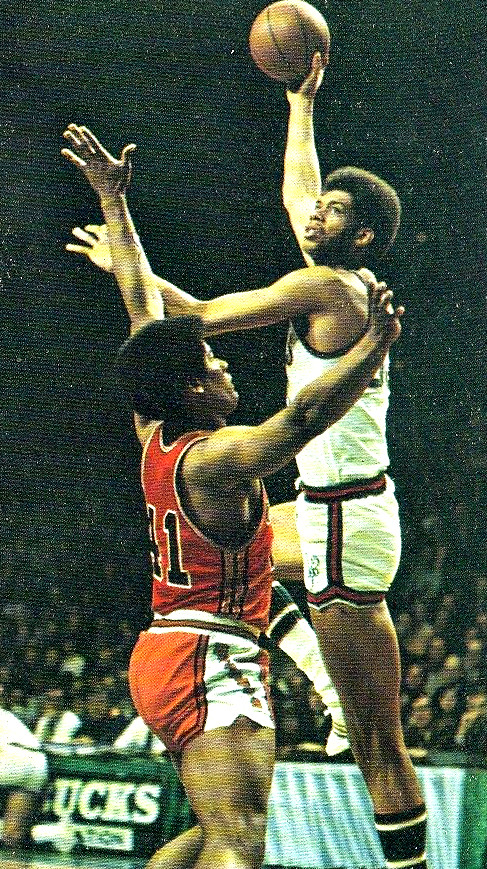
Kareem Abdul-Jabbar (right) has the most personal fouls in NBA history, achieved in the second most games

Statistics accurate as of November 13, 2026.

NBA career personal fouls leaders (top 50)
Rank	Player	Pos	Team(s) played for (years) (Note: American Basketball Association (ABA) teams other than those admitted into the NBA in 1976 are not included; each year is linked to an article about that particular NBA season.)	Total personal fouls	Games played	Personal fouls per game average (Note: Average is rounded to the nearest hundredth.)
1	Kareem Abdul-Jabbar*	C	Milwaukee Bucks (1969–1975); Los Angeles Lakers (1975–1989)	4,657	1,560	2.99
2	Karl Malone*	PF	Utah Jazz (1985–2003); Los Angeles Lakers (2003–2004)	4,578	1,476	3.10
3	Robert Parish*	C	Golden State Warriors (1976–1980); Boston Celtics (1980–1994); Charlotte Hornets (1994–1996); Chicago Bulls (1996–1997)	4,443	1,611	2.76
4	Charles Oakley	PF	Chicago Bulls (1985–1988, 2001–2002); New York Knicks (1988–1998); Toronto Raptors (1998–2001); Washington Wizards (2002–2003); Houston Rockets (2004)	4,421	1,282	3.45
5	Hakeem Olajuwon*	C	Houston Rockets (1984–2001); Toronto Raptors (2001–2002)	4,383	1,238	3.54
6	Buck Williams	PF	New Jersey Nets (1981–1989); Portland Trail Blazers (1989–1996); New York Knicks (1996–1998)	4,267	1,307	3.26
7	Elvin Hayes*	PF/C	San Diego/Houston Rockets (1968–1972); Capital/Washington Bullets (1972–1981); Houston Rockets (1981–1984)	4,193	1,303	3.22
8	Clifford Robinson	SF/PF	Portland Trail Blazers (1989–1997); Phoenix Suns (1997–2001); Detroit Pistons (2001–2002); Golden State Warriors (2003–2004); New Jersey Nets (2004–2007)	4,175	1,380	3.02
9	Kevin Willis	PF/C	Atlanta Hawks (1984–1994, 2004–2005); Miami Heat (1994–1995); Golden State Warriors (1995–1997); Houston Rockets (1997–1999); Toronto Raptors (1999–2001); Denver Nuggets (2001–2002); San Antonio Spurs (2002–2004); Dallas Mavericks (2006–2007)	4,172	1,424	2.93
10	Shaquille O'Neal*	C	Orlando Magic (1992–1996); Los Angeles Lakers (1996–2004); Miami Heat (2004–2008); Phoenix Suns (2008–2009); Cleveland Cavaliers (2009–2010); Boston Celtics (2010–2011)	4,146	1,207	3.44
10	Otis Thorpe	PF/C	Kansas City/Sacramento Kings (1984–1988); Houston Rockets (1988–1995); Portland Trail Blazers (1995); Detroit Pistons (1995–1997); Vancouver Grizzlies (1997–1998); Sacramento Kings (1998); Washington Wizards (1998–1999); Miami Heat (1999–2000); Charlotte Hornets (2000–2001)	4,146	1,257	3.30
12	James Edwards	C	Los Angeles Lakers (1977–1979); Indiana Pacers (1979–1981); Cleveland Cavaliers (1981–1983); Phoenix Suns (1983–1988); Detroit Pistons (1988–1992, 1995–1996); Los Angeles Clippers (1992); Portland Trail Blazers (1994–1995); Chicago Bulls (1996)	4,042	1,168	3.46
13	Patrick Ewing*	C	New York Knicks (1985–2000); Seattle SuperSonics (2000–2001); Orlando Magic (2001–2002)	4,034	1,183	3.41
14	Vince Carter*	SG/SF	Toronto Raptors (1998–2005); New Jersey Nets (2005–2009); Orlando Magic (2009–2010); Phoenix Suns (2010–2011); Dallas Mavericks (2011–2014); Memphis Grizzlies (2014–2017); Sacramento Kings (2017–2018); Atlanta Hawks (2018–2020)	3,995	1,541	2.59
15	John Stockton*	PG	Utah Jazz (1984–2003)	3,942	1,504	2.62
16	Dwight Howard*	C	Orlando Magic (2004–2012); Los Angeles Lakers (2012–2013, 2019–2020, 2021–2022); Houston Rockets (2013–2016); Atlanta Hawks (2016–2017); Charlotte Hornets (2017–2018); Washington Wizards (2018–2019); Philadelphia 76ers (2020–2021)	3,912	1,242	3.15
17	Jack Sikma*	C/PF	Seattle SuperSonics (1977–1986); Milwaukee Bucks (1986–1991)	3,879	1,107	3.50
18	Hal Greer*	SG	Syracuse Nationals/Philadelphia 76ers (1958–1973)	3,855	1,122	3.44
19	Terry Cummings	SF/PF	San Diego Clippers (1982–1984); Milwaukee Bucks (1984–1989, 1995–1999); San Antonio Spurs (1989–1995); Seattle SuperSonics (1999–2000); Golden State Warriors (2001–2002); New York Knicks (2002)	3,836	1,183	3.24
20	Shawn Kemp	PF/C	Seattle SuperSonics (1989–1997); Cleveland Cavaliers (1997–2000); Portland Trail Blazers (2000–2002); Orlando Magic (2002–2003)	3,826	1,051	3.64
21	Tom Chambers	PF/SF	San Diego/Los Angeles Clippers (1981–1983); Seattle SuperSonics (1983–1988); Phoenix Suns (1988–1993); Utah Jazz (1993–1995); Philadelphia 76ers (1997)	3,742	1,107	3.38
22	Paul Pierce*	SF/SG	Boston Celtics (1998–2013); Brooklyn Nets (2013–2014); Washington Wizards (2014–2015); Los Angeles Clippers (2015–2017)	3,643	1,343	2.71
23	Bill Laimbeer	C	Cleveland Cavaliers (1980–1982); Detroit Pistons (1982–1994)	3,633	1,068	3.40
24	Vlade Divac*	C	Los Angeles Lakers (1989–1996); Charlotte Hornets (1996–1998); Sacramento Kings (1998–2004, 2005)	3,609	1,134	3.18
25	Dirk Nowitzki*	PF	Dallas Mavericks (1998–2019)	3,601	1,522	2.37
26	Kurt Thomas	PF/C	Miami Heat (1995–1997); Dallas Mavericks (1997–1998); New York Knicks (1998–2005, 2012–2013); Phoenix Suns (2005–2007); Seattle SuperSonics (2007–2008); San Antonio Spurs (2008–2009); Milwaukee Bucks (2009–2010); Chicago Bulls (2010–2011); Portland Trail Blazers (2011–2012)	3,579	1,110	3.22
27	Kevin Garnett*	PF	Minnesota Timberwolves (1995–2007, 2015–2016); Boston Celtics (2007–2013); Brooklyn Nets (2013–2015)	3,561	1,462	2.44
28	Carmelo Anthony*	SF	Denver Nuggets (2003–2011); New York Knicks (2011–2017); Oklahoma City Thunder (2017–2018); Houston Rockets (2018–2019); Portland Trail Blazers (2019–2021); Los Angeles Lakers (2021–2022)	3,543	1,260	2.81
29	Walt Bellamy*	C	Chicago Packers/Zephyrs (1961–1963); Baltimore Bullets (1963–1968); New York Knicks (1966–1969); Detroit Pistons (1969–1970); Atlanta Hawks (1970–1974); New Orleans Jazz (1974–1975)	3,536	1,043	3.39
30	Caldwell Jones	C/PF	Philadelphia 76ers (1976–1982); Houston Rockets (1982–1984); Chicago Bulls (1984–1985); Portland Trail Blazers (1985–1989); San Antonio Spurs (1989–1990)	3,527	1,068	3.30
31	Rick Mahorn	PF/C	Washington Bullets (1980–1985); Detroit Pistons (1985–1989, 1996–1998); Philadelphia 76ers (1989–1991, 1998–1999); New Jersey Nets (1992–1996)	3,499	1,117	3.13
32	Bailey Howell*	SF/PF	Detroit Pistons (1959–1964); Baltimore Bullets (1964–1966); Boston Celtics (1966–1970); Philadelphia 76ers (1970–1971)	3,498	950	3.68
33	Danny Schayes	C	Utah Jazz (1981–1983); Denver Nuggets (1983–1990); Milwaukee Bucks (1990–1993); Los Angeles Lakers (1993–1994); Phoenix Suns (1994–1995); Miami Heat (1995–1996); Orlando Magic (1996–1999)	3,494	1,138	3.07
34	Juwan Howard	PF/SF	Washington Bullets/Wizards (1994–2001); Dallas Mavericks (2001–2002); Denver Nuggets (2002–2003); Orlando Magic (2003–2004); Houston Rockets (2004–2007); Dallas Mavericks (2007–2008); Portland Trail Blazers (2009–2010); Charlotte Bobcats (2010–2011); Miami Heat (2011–2013)	3,493	1,208	2.89
35	Sam Lacey	C	Cincinnati Royals/Kansas City-Omaha/Kansas City Kings (1970–1982); New Jersey Nets (1982–1983); Cleveland Cavaliers (1983)	3,473	1,002	3.47
36	Jerome Kersey	SF/PF	Portland Trail Blazers (1984–1995); Golden State Warriors (1995–1996); Los Angeles Lakers (1996–1997); Seattle SuperSonics (1997–1998); San Antonio Spurs (1998–2001); Milwaukee Bucks (2001)	3,455	1,153	3.00
37	Dolph Schayes*	PF/C	Syracuse Nationals/Philadelphia 76ers (1948–1964)	3,432	996	3.45
38	Dikembe Mutombo*	C	Denver Nuggets (1991–1996); Atlanta Hawks (1996–2001); Philadelphia 76ers (2001–2002); New Jersey Nets (2002–2003); New York Knicks (2003–2004); Houston Rockets (2004–2009)	3,383	1,196	2.83
39	Tree Rollins	C	Atlanta Hawks (1977–1988); Cleveland Cavaliers (1988–1990); Detroit Pistons (1990–1991); Houston Rockets (1991–1993); Orlando Magic (1993–1995)	3,377	1,156	2.92
40	Bill Bridges	PF/C	St. Louis Hawks/Atlanta Hawks (1962–1971); Philadelphia 76ers (1971–1975); Los Angeles Lakers (1975)	3,375	926	3.64
41	Detlef Schrempf	SF/PF	Dallas Mavericks (1985–1989); Indiana Pacers (1989–1993); Seattle SuperSonics (1993–1999); Portland Trail Blazers (1999–2001)	3,360	1,136	2.96
42	Kobe Bryant*	SG	Los Angeles Lakers (1996–2016)	3,353	1,346	2.49
43	Scottie Pippen*	SF	Chicago Bulls (1987–1998, 2003–2004); Houston Rockets (1999); Portland Trail Blazers (1999–2003)	3,329	1,178	2.83
44	Tim Duncan*	PF/C	San Antonio Spurs (1997–2016)	3,304	1,392	2.37
44	Russell Westbrook^{†}	PG	Oklahoma City Thunder (2008–2019); Houston Rockets (2019–2020); Washington Wizards (2020–2021); Los Angeles Lakers (2021–2023); Los Angeles Clippers (2023–2024); Denver Nuggets (2024–2025); Sacramento Kings (2025–present)	3,304	1,301	2.54
46	Charles Barkley*	PF	Philadelphia 76ers (1984–1992); Phoenix Suns (1992–1996); Houston Rockets (1996–2000)	3,287	1,073	3.06
47	Clyde Drexler*	SG	Portland Trail Blazers (1983–1995); Houston Rockets (1995–1998)	3,285	1,086	3.02
47	Lenny Wilkens*	PG	St. Louis Hawks (1960–1968); Seattle SuperSonics (1968–1972); Cleveland Cavaliers (1972–1974); Portland Trail Blazers (1974–1975)	3,285	1,077	3.05
49	John Havlicek*	SF/SG	Boston Celtics (1962–1978)	3,281	1,270	2.58
50	Tyson Chandler	C	Los Angeles Clippers (2001–2002); Chicago Bulls (2002–2006); New Orleans Hornets/Pelicans (2006–2009); Charlotte Bobcats (2009–2010); Dallas Mavericks (2010–2011, 2014–2018); New York Knicks (2011–2014); Phoenix Suns (2018–2019); Los Angeles Lakers (2019); Houston Rockets (2019–2020)	3,268	1,231	2.65

== Progressive list of personal fouls leaders ==
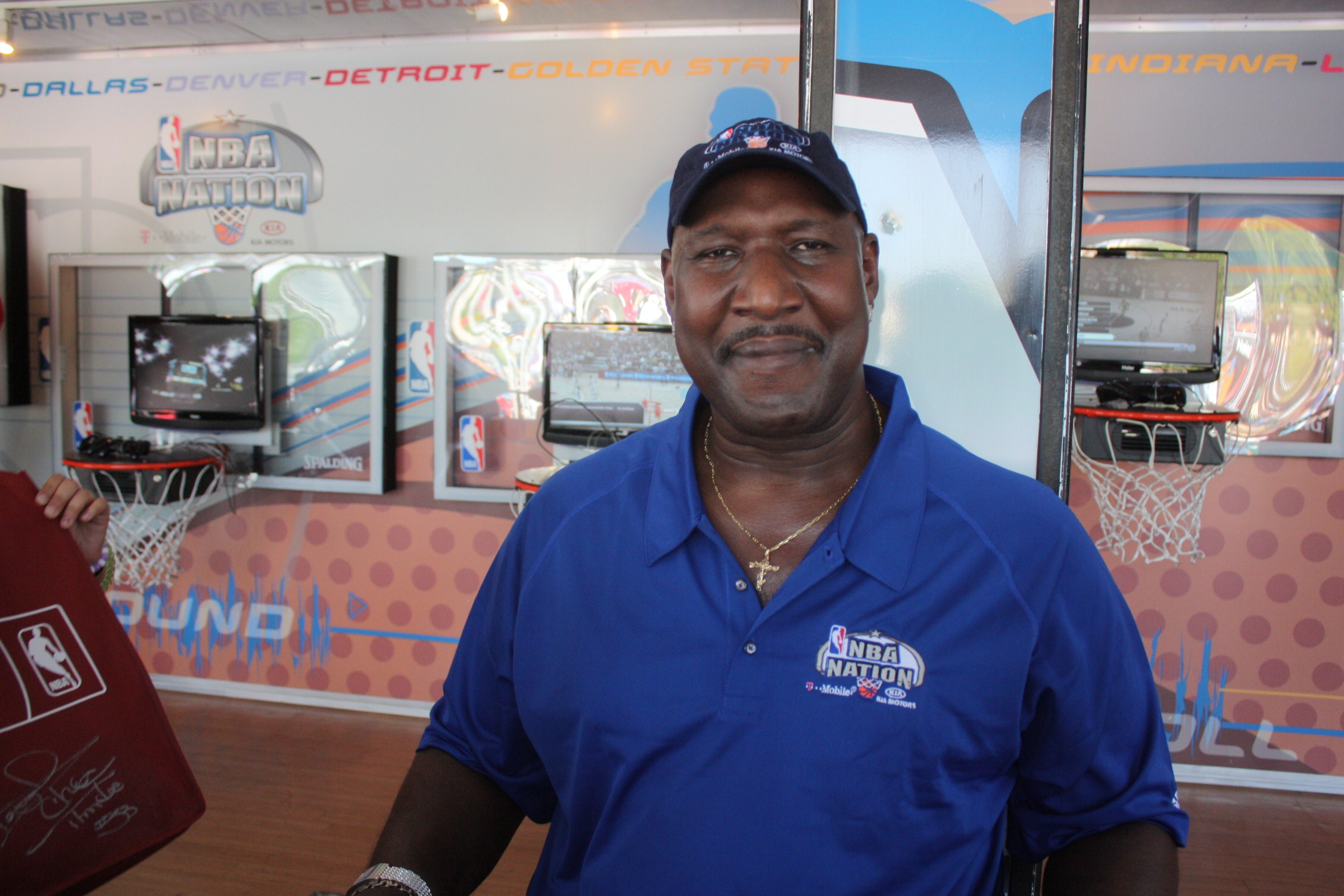
Darryl Dawkins holds the single-season personal fouls record with 386.

Statistics accurate as of November 13, 2026.

Team abbreviations (team listed is the one a player was on when he established the record)
ATL	Atlanta Hawks	DEN	Denver Nuggets	MIA	Miami Heat	PHX	Phoenix Suns
BLB	Baltimore Bullets (1944–1954)	DTF	Detroit Falcons	MIL	Milwaukee Bucks	POR	Portland Trail Blazers
BAL	Baltimore Bullets (1963–1973)	DET	Detroit Pistons	MNL	Minneapolis Lakers	ROC	Rochester Royals
BOS	Boston Celtics	FTW	Fort Wayne Pistons	MIN	Minnesota Timberwolves	SAC	Sacramento Kings
BKN	Brooklyn Nets	GSW	Golden State Warriors	NJN	New Jersey Nets	SAN	San Antonio Spurs
CAP	Capital Bullets	HOU	Houston Rockets	NOJ	New Orleans Jazz	SEA	Seattle SuperSonics
CHO	Charlotte Hornets	IND	Indiana Pacers	NOP	New Orleans Pelicans	STL	St. Louis Hawks
CHI	Chicago Bulls	KCK	Kansas City Kings	NYK	New York Knicks	SYR	Syracuse Nationals
CHS	Chicago Stags	LAC	Los Angeles Clippers	ORL	Orlando Magic	TOR	Toronto Raptors
CIN	Cincinnati Royals	LAL	Los Angeles Lakers	PHI	Philadelphia 76ers	UTA	Utah Jazz
CLE	Cleveland Cavaliers	MEM	Memphis Grizzlies	PHW	Philadelphia Warriors	WSB	Washington Bullets

Progressive personal fouls leaders
Season	Year-by-year leader	PF	Active player leader	PF	Career record	PF	Single-season record	PF	Season
1946–47	Stan MiasekDTF	208	Stan Miasek; DTF 1946–47; CHS 1947–48	208	Stan Miasek; DTF 1946–47; CHS 1947–48	208	Stan MiasekDTF	208	1946–47
1947–48	Chuck GilmurCHS	231	Stan Miasek; DTF 1946–47; CHS 1947–48	400	Stan Miasek; DTF 1946–47; CHS 1947–48	400	Chuck GilmurCHS	231	1947–48
1948–49	Ed SadowskiPHW	273	Ed Sadowski; PHW 1948–49; BLB 1949–50	649	Ed Sadowski; PHW 1948–49; BLB 1949–50	649	Ed SadowskiPHW	273	1948–49
1949–50	George Mikan*MNL	297	Ed Sadowski; PHW 1948–49; BLB 1949–50	893	Ed Sadowski; PHW 1948–49; BLB 1949–50	893	George Mikan*MNL	297	1949–50
1950–51	George Mikan*MNL	308	Joe Fulks*PHW	1,110	Joe Fulks*PHW	1,110	George Mikan*MNL	308	1950–51
1951–52	George Mikan*MNL	286	Joe Fulks*PHW	1,365	Joe Fulks*PHW	1,365	George Mikan*MNL	308	1951–52
1952–53	Monk MeinekeFTW	334	Joe Fulks*PHW	1,684	Joe Fulks*PHW	1,684	Monk MeinekeFTW	334	1952–53
1953–54	Earl Lloyd*SYR	303	Joe Fulks*PHW	1,774	Joe Fulks*PHW	1,774	Monk MeinekeFTW	334	1953–54
1954–55	Vern Mikkelsen*MNL	319	Arnie Risen*; ROC 1954–55; BOS 1955–56	1,791	Arnie Risen*; ROC 1954–55; BOS 1955–56	1,791	Monk MeinekeFTW	334	1954–55
1955–56	Vern Mikkelsen*MNL	319	Arnie Risen*; ROC 1954–55; BOS 1955–56	2,091	Arnie Risen*; ROC 1954–55; BOS 1955–56	2,091	Monk MeinekeFTW	334	1955–56
1956–57	Vern Mikkelsen*MNL	312	Vern Mikkelsen*MNL	2,267	Vern Mikkelsen*MNL	2,267	Monk MeinekeFTW	334	1956–57
1957–58	Walter DukesDET	311	Vern Mikkelsen*MNL	2,566	Vern Mikkelsen*MNL	2,566	Monk MeinekeFTW	334	1957–58
1958–59	Walter DukesDET	332	Vern Mikkelsen*MNL	2,812	Vern Mikkelsen*MNL	2,812	Monk MeinekeFTW	334	1958–59
1959–60	Tom Gola*PHW	311	Dolph Schayes*; SYR 1959–63; PHI 1963–64	2,716	Vern Mikkelsen*MNL	2,812	Monk MeinekeFTW	334	1959–60
1960–61	Paul Arizin*PHW	335	Dolph Schayes*; SYR 1959–63; PHI 1963–64	3,012	Dolph Schayes*; SYR 1960–63; PHI 1963–64	3,012	Paul Arizin*PHW	335	1960–61
1961–62	Tom MescheryPHW	330	Dolph Schayes*; SYR 1959–63; PHI 1963–64	3,179	Dolph Schayes*; SYR 1960–63; PHI 1963–64	3,179	Paul Arizin*PHW	335	1961–62
1962–63	Zelmo Beaty*STL	312	Dolph Schayes*; SYR 1959–63; PHI 1963–64	3,356	Dolph Schayes*; SYR 1960–63; PHI 1963–64	3,356	Paul Arizin*PHW	335	1962–63
1963–64	Wayne Embry*CIN	325	Dolph Schayes*; SYR 1959–63; PHI 1963–64	3,432	Dolph Schayes*; SYR 1960–63; PHI 1963–64	3,432	Paul Arizin*PHW	335	1963–64
1964–65	Bailey Howell*BAL	345	Jack Twyman*CIN	2,660	Dolph Schayes*; SYR 1960–63; PHI 1963–64	3,432	Bailey Howell*BAL	345	1964–65
1965–66	Zelmo Beaty*STL	344	Jack Twyman*CIN	2,782	Dolph Schayes*; SYR 1960–63; PHI 1963–64	3,432	Bailey Howell*BAL	345	1965–66
1966–67	Joe StrawderDET	344	Richie Guerin*STL	2,694	Dolph Schayes*; SYR 1960–63; PHI 1963–64	3,432	Bailey Howell*BAL	345	1966–67
1967–68	Bill BridgesSTL	366	Bailey Howell*BOS	2,718	Dolph Schayes*; SYR 1960–63; PHI 1963–64	3,432	Bill BridgesSTL	366	1967–68
1968–69	Billy Cunningham*PHI	329	Bailey Howell*BOS	3,003	Dolph Schayes*; SYR 1960–63; PHI 1963–64	3,432	Bill BridgesSTL	366	1968–69
1969–70	Jim DavisATL	335	Bailey Howell*BOS	3,264	Dolph Schayes*; SYR 1960–63; PHI 1963–64	3,432	Bill BridgesSTL	366	1969–70
1970–71	Dave Cowens*BOS	350	Hal Greer*PHI	3,511	Hal Greer*PHI	3,511	Bill BridgesSTL	366	1970–71
1971–72	Dave Cowens*BOS	314	Hal Greer*PHI	3,779	Hal Greer*PHI	3,779	Bill BridgesSTL	366	1971–72
1972–73	Neal WalkPHX	323	Hal Greer*PHI	3,855	Hal Greer*PHI	3,855	Bill BridgesSTL	366	1972–73
1973–74	Kevin PorterCAP	319	Walt Bellamy*; ATL 1973–74; NOJ 1974	3,534	Hal Greer*PHI	3,855	Bill BridgesSTL	366	1973–74
1974–75	Bob Dandridge*MIL; Phil Jackson* (Note: Jackson was inducted into the Hall of Fame as a coach.)NYK	330	Walt Bellamy*; ATL 1973–74; NOJ 1974	3,536	Hal Greer*PHI	3,855	Bill BridgesSTL	366	1974–75
1975–76	Charlie Scott*BOS	356	John Havlicek*BOS	2,888	Hal Greer*PHI	3,855	Bill BridgesSTL	366	1975–76
1976–77	Lonnie SheltonNYK	363	John Havlicek*BOS	3,096	Hal Greer*PHI	3,855	Bill BridgesSTL	366	1976–77
1977–78	Lonnie SheltonNYK	350	John Havlicek*BOS	3,281	Hal Greer*PHI	3,855	Bill BridgesSTL	366	1977–78
1978–79	Bill RobinzineKCK	367	Paul SilasSEA	2,985	Hal Greer*PHI	3,855	Bill RobinzineKCK	367	1978–79
1979–80	Darryl DawkinsPHI	328	Elvin Hayes*; WSB 1979–81; HOU 1981–84	3,251	Hal Greer*PHI	3,855	Bill RobinzineKCK	367	1979–80
1980–81	Ben PoquetteUTA	342	Elvin Hayes*; WSB 1979–81; HOU 1981–84	3,551	Hal Greer*PHI	3,855	Bill RobinzineKCK	367	1980–81
1981–82	Steve JohnsonKCK	372	Elvin Hayes*; WSB 1979–81; HOU 1981–84	3,838	Hal Greer*PHI	3,855	Steve JohnsonKCK	372	1981–82
1982–83	Darryl DawkinsNJN	379	Elvin Hayes*; WSB 1979–81; HOU 1981–84	4,070	Elvin Hayes*HOU	4,070	Darryl DawkinsNJN	379	1982–83
1983–84	Darryl DawkinsNJN	386	Elvin Hayes*; WSB 1979–81; HOU 1981–84	4,193	Elvin Hayes*HOU	4,193	Darryl DawkinsNJN	386	1983–84
1984–85	Hakeem Olajuwon*HOU	344	Kareem Abdul-Jabbar*LAL	3,752	Elvin Hayes*HOU	4,193	Darryl DawkinsNJN	386	1984–85
1985–86	Charles Barkley*PHI	333	Kareem Abdul-Jabbar*LAL	4,000	Elvin Hayes*HOU	4,193	Darryl DawkinsNJN	386	1985–86
1986–87	Steve JohnsonPOR	340	Kareem Abdul-Jabbar*LAL	4,245	Kareem Abdul-Jabbar*LAL	4,245	Darryl DawkinsNJN	386	1986–87
1987–88	Patrick Ewing*NYK	332	Kareem Abdul-Jabbar*LAL	4,461	Kareem Abdul-Jabbar*LAL	4,461	Darryl DawkinsNJN	386	1987–88
1988–89	Grant LongMIA	337	Kareem Abdul-Jabbar*LAL	4,657	Kareem Abdul-Jabbar*LAL	4,657	Darryl DawkinsNJN	386	1988–89
1989–90	Rik SmitsIND	328	Jack Sikma*MIL	3,661	Kareem Abdul-Jabbar*LAL	4,657	Darryl DawkinsNJN	386	1989–90
1990–91	Sam MitchellMIN	338	Jack Sikma*MIL	3,879	Kareem Abdul-Jabbar*LAL	4,657	Darryl DawkinsNJN	386	1990–91
1991–92	Tyrone HillGSW	315	Robert Parish*; BOS 1991–94; CHO 1994–96; CHI 1996–97	3,800	Kareem Abdul-Jabbar*LAL	4,657	Darryl DawkinsNJN	386	1991–92
1992–93	Stanley RobertsLAC	332	Robert Parish*; BOS 1991–94; CHO 1994–96; CHI 1996–97	4,001	Kareem Abdul-Jabbar*LAL	4,657	Darryl DawkinsNJN	386	1992–93
1993–94	Shawn KempSEA	312	Robert Parish*; BOS 1991–94; CHO 1994–96; CHI 1996–97	4,191	Kareem Abdul-Jabbar*LAL	4,657	Darryl DawkinsNJN	386	1993–94
1994–95	Shawn BradleyPHI	338	Robert Parish*; BOS 1991–94; CHO 1994–96; CHI 1996–97	4,323	Kareem Abdul-Jabbar*LAL	4,657	Darryl DawkinsNJN	386	1994–95
1995–96	Elden CampbellLAL; Otis ThorpeDET	300	Robert Parish*; BOS 1991–94; CHO 1994–96; CHI 1996–97	4,403	Kareem Abdul-Jabbar*LAL	4,657	Darryl DawkinsNJN	386	1995–96
1996–97	Shawn KempSEA	320	Robert Parish*; BOS 1991–94; CHO 1994–96; CHI 1996–97	4,443	Kareem Abdul-Jabbar*LAL	4,657	Darryl DawkinsNJN	386	1996–97
1997–98	Ervin JohnsonMIL	321	Buck WilliamsNYK	4,267	Kareem Abdul-Jabbar*LAL	4,657	Darryl DawkinsNJN	386	1997–98
1998–99	Danny FortsonDEN	212	Hakeem Olajuwon*; HOU 1998–2001; TOR 2001–02	4,007	Kareem Abdul-Jabbar*LAL	4,657	Darryl DawkinsNJN	386	1998–99
1999–00	Shawn KempCLE	371	Hakeem Olajuwon*; HOU 1998–2001; TOR 2001–02	4,095	Kareem Abdul-Jabbar*LAL	4,657	Darryl DawkinsNJN	386	1999–2000
2000–01	Aaron WilliamsNJN	319	Hakeem Olajuwon*; HOU 1998–2001; TOR 2001–02	4,236	Kareem Abdul-Jabbar*LAL	4,657	Darryl DawkinsNJN	386	2000–01
2001–02	Kurt ThomasNYK	341	Hakeem Olajuwon*; HOU 1998–2001; TOR 2001–02	4,383	Kareem Abdul-Jabbar*LAL	4,657	Darryl DawkinsNJN	386	2001–02
2002–03	Kurt ThomasNYK	344	Karl Malone*; UTA 2002–03; LAL 2003–04	4,462	Kareem Abdul-Jabbar*LAL	4,657	Darryl DawkinsNJN	386	2002–03
2003–04	Theo RatliffATL & POR	300	Karl Malone*; UTA 2002–03; LAL 2003–04	4,578	Kareem Abdul-Jabbar*LAL	4,657	Darryl DawkinsNJN	386	2003–04
2004–05	Jason CollinsNJN	322	Kevin WillisATL	4,161	Kareem Abdul-Jabbar*LAL	4,657	Darryl DawkinsNJN	386	2004–05
2005–06	Al HarringtonATL	301	Clifford RobinsonNJN	4,077	Kareem Abdul-Jabbar*LAL	4,657	Darryl DawkinsNJN	386	2005–06
2006–07	Andris BiedriņšGSW	304	Clifford RobinsonNJN	4,175	Kareem Abdul-Jabbar*LAL	4,657	Darryl DawkinsNJN	386	2006–07
2007–08	Mikki MooreSAC	310	Shaquille O'Neal*; MIA 2007–08; PHX 2008–09; CLE 2009–10; BOS 2010–11	3,604	Kareem Abdul-Jabbar*LAL	4,657	Darryl DawkinsNJN	386	2007–08
2008–09	Jason ThompsonSAC	314	Shaquille O'Neal*; MIA 2007–08; PHX 2008–09; CLE 2009–10; BOS 2010–11	3,857	Kareem Abdul-Jabbar*LAL	4,657	Darryl DawkinsNJN	386	2008–09
2009–10	Dwight Howard*ORL	287	Shaquille O'Neal*; MIA 2007–08; PHX 2008–09; CLE 2009–10; BOS 2010–11	4,026	Kareem Abdul-Jabbar*LAL	4,657	Darryl DawkinsNJN	386	2009–10
2010–11	DeMarcus CousinsSAC	332	Shaquille O'Neal*; MIA 2007–08; PHX 2008–09; CLE 2009–10; BOS 2010–11	4,146	Kareem Abdul-Jabbar*LAL	4,657	Darryl DawkinsNJN	386	2010–11
2011–12	DeMarcus CousinsSAC	257	Kurt Thomas; POR 2011–12; NYK 2012–13	3,527	Kareem Abdul-Jabbar*LAL	4,657	Darryl DawkinsNJN	386	2011–12
2012–13	Amir JohnsonTOR	301	Kurt Thomas; POR 2011–12; NYK 2012–13	3,579	Kareem Abdul-Jabbar*LAL	4,657	Darryl DawkinsNJN	386	2012–13
2013–14	Andre Drummond^DET	273	Kevin Garnett*; BKN 2013–15; MIN 2015	3,382	Kareem Abdul-Jabbar*LAL	4,657	Darryl DawkinsNJN	386	2013–14
2014–15	Andre Drummond^DET	285	Kevin Garnett*; BKN 2013–15; MIN 2015	3,491	Kareem Abdul-Jabbar*LAL	4,657	Darryl DawkinsNJN	386	2014–15
2015–16	Giannis Antetokounmpo^MIL	258	Paul Pierce*LAC	3,603	Kareem Abdul-Jabbar*LAL	4,657	Darryl DawkinsNJN	386	2015–16
2016–17	DeMarcus CousinsSAC & NOP	278	Vince Carter*; MEM 2016–17; SAC 2017–18; ATL 2018–20	3,668	Kareem Abdul-Jabbar*LAL	4,657	Darryl DawkinsNJN	386	2016–17
2017–18	Karl-Anthony Towns^MIN	285	Vince Carter*; MEM 2016–17; SAC 2017–18; ATL 2018–20	3,764	Kareem Abdul-Jabbar*LAL	4,657	Darryl DawkinsNJN	386	2017–18
2018–19	Karl-Anthony Towns^MIN	292	Vince Carter*; MEM 2016–17; SAC 2017–18; ATL 2018–20	3,905	Kareem Abdul-Jabbar*LAL	4,657	Darryl DawkinsNJN	386	2018–19
2019–20	Dillon Brooks^MEM	278	Vince Carter*; MEM 2016–17; SAC 2017–18; ATL 2018–20	3,995	Kareem Abdul-Jabbar*LAL	4,657	Darryl DawkinsNJN	386	2019–20
2020–21	Dillon Brooks^MEM	237	Dwight Howard*; PHI 2020–21; LAL 2021–22	3,797	Kareem Abdul-Jabbar*LAL	4,657	Darryl DawkinsNJN	386	2020–21
2021–22	Jae'Sean Tate^HOU	286	Dwight Howard*; PHI 2020–21; LAL 2021–22	3,912	Kareem Abdul-Jabbar*LAL	4,657	Darryl DawkinsNJN	386	2021–22
2022–23	Domantas Sabonis^SAC	279	Kyle Lowry^{†} MIA 2022–24; PHI 2024	2,953	Kareem Abdul-Jabbar*LAL	4,657	Darryl DawkinsNJN	386	2022–23
2023–24	Jusuf Nurkić^PHX	254	Kyle Lowry^{†} MIA 2022–24; PHI 2024	3,099	Kareem Abdul-Jabbar*LAL	4,657	Darryl DawkinsNJN	386	2023–24
2024–25	Jaren Jackson Jr.^MEM	257	Chris Paul^{†}SAS	3,185	Kareem Abdul-Jabbar*LAL	4,657	Darryl DawkinsNJN	386	2024–25
2025–26	Wendell Carter Jr.^ORL	267	Russell Westbrook^{†}SAC	3,304	Kareem Abdul-Jabbar*LAL	4,657	Darryl DawkinsNJN	386	2025–26
2026–27	Kyshawn George^WAS	44	Brook Lopez^LAC	3,054	Kareem Abdul-Jabbar*LAL	4,657	Darryl DawkinsNJN	386	2026–27
Season	Year-by-year leader	PF	Active player leader	PF	Career record	PF	Single-season record	PF	Season

== See also ==
- Basketball statistics
- NBA regular season records
