= Henry Pearcy =

American basketball player (1922–2002)

Personal information
- Born: July 21, 1922 Martinsville, Indiana, U.S.
- Died: January 11, 2002 (aged 79) Martinsville, Indiana, U.S.
- Listed height: 6 ft 1 in (1.85 m)
- Listed weight: 170 lb (77 kg)

Career information
- High school: Martinsville (Martinsville, Indiana)
- College: Indiana State (1940-1943)
- Position: Guard
- Number: 44

Career history
- 1946–1947: Detroit Falcons
- Stats at NBA.com
- Stats at Basketball Reference

Henry Earl Pearcy Sr. (July 21, 1922 – January 11, 2002) was an American professional basketball player. He played in 29 games for the Detroit Falcons of the Basketball Association of America in the 1946–47 season. He recorded 73 points, 7 assists, and 20 personal fouls in his career. Henry is the younger brother of George Pearcy, who also played for the Falcons that season.

Following his college career; Henry joined the United States Army Air Forces. During World War II, he was a B-24 pilot in the European Theater; based in the United Kingdom, he flew 33 missions over Germany.

Henry returned to Indiana State and obtained a master's degree in education and began a 40-year career in education.

== BAA career statistics ==
Legend
GP	Games played
FG%	Field-goal percentage
FT%	Free-throw percentage
APG	Assists per game
PPG	Points per game

=== Regular season ===
Year	Team	GP	FG%	FT%	APG	PPG
1946–47	Detroit	29	.222	.735	.2	2.5
Career		29	.222	.735	.2	2.5
