= D. C. Wilcutt =

American basketball player and coach

Personal information
- Born: March 25, 1923 Patton, Alabama, U.S.
- Died: October 19, 2015 (aged 92) St. Louis, Missouri, U.S.
- Listed height: 6 ft 2 in (1.88 m)
- Listed weight: 165 lb (75 kg)

Career information
- College: Saint Louis (1944–1948)
- BAA draft: 1948: – round, –
- Drafted by: St. Louis Bombers
- Playing career: 1948–1950
- Position: Guard
- Number: 3, 5
- Coaching career: 1952–1987

Career history

Playing
- 1948–1950: St. Louis Bombers

Coaching
- 1952–1987: Christian Brothers College HS

Career highlights
- NIT champion (1948)

Career BAA/NBA statistics
- Points: 128 (2.2 ppg)
- Assists: 80 (1.4 apg)
- Stats at NBA.com
- Stats at Basketball Reference

D. C. "Dixie" Wilcutt (March 25, 1923 – October 19, 2015) was an American professional basketball player. Wilcutt was selected in the 1948 BAA draft by the St. Louis Bombers. He played for the Bombers for two seasons. The first year they were in the Basketball Association of America. That league then combined with the National Basketball League to form the modern day National Basketball Association, which Wilcutt then played in for one season before retiring from basketball. He played college basketball for Saint Louis.

Wilcutt soon thereafter became the head boys' basketball coach and athletic director at Christian Brothers College High School in St. Louis, Missouri. He remained there from 1952 to 1987. His teams won 11 sectional championships, three state titles, and Wilcutt became the winningest coach in school history with a career record of 571–332.

Wilcutt died on October 19, 2015.

== BAA/NBA career statistics ==
Legend
GP	Games played	FG%	Field-goal percentage
FT%	Free-throw percentage	APG	Assists per game
PPG	Points per game	**Bold**	Career high

=== Regular season ===
Year	Team	GP	FG%	FT%	APG	PPG
1948–49	St. Louis	22	**.353**	**.833**	**1.4**	**2.3**
1949–50	St. Louis	**37**	.329	.690	1.3	2.1
Career		59	.339	.733	1.4	2.2

=== Playoffs ===
Year	Team	GP	FG%	FT%	APG	PPG
1949	St. Louis	2	.429	.000	2.0	3.0
Career		2	.429	.000	2.0	3.0
