= Easy Parham =

American basketball player (1921–1982)

Personal information
- Born: December 27, 1921 Fort Worth, Texas, U.S.
- Died: October 4, 1982 (aged 60) Tarrant County, Texas, U.S.
- Listed height: 6 ft 3 in (1.91 m)
- Listed weight: 200 lb (91 kg)

Career information
- College: Texas Wesleyan (1941–1943, 1946–1948)
- BAA draft: 1948: -- round, --
- Drafted by: St. Louis Bombers
- Playing career: 1948–1951
- Position: Small forward / shooting guard
- Number: 6, 14

Career history
- 1948–1950: St. Louis Bombers
- 1950–1951: Philadelphia Warriors
- 1951: Grand Rapids Hornets

Career BAA/NBA statistics
- Points: 712 (5.4 ppg)
- Rebounds: 9 (1.3 rpg)
- Assists: 285 (2.1 apg)
- Stats at NBA.com
- Stats at Basketball Reference

Estes Foster "Easy" Parham (December 27, 1921 – October 4, 1982) was an American professional basketball player. Parham was selected in the 1948 BAA draft by the St. Louis Bombers after a collegiate career at Texas Wesleyan. He played for the Bombers for two seasons and then the Philadelphia Warriors for one season before ending his BAA/NBA career.

== BAA/NBA career statistics ==
Legend
GP	Games played	FG%	Field-goal percentage
FT%	Free-throw percentage	RPG	Rebounds per game
APG	Assists per game	PPG	Points per game
**Bold**	Career high

=== Regular season ===
Year	Team	GP	FG%	FT%	RPG	APG	PPG
1948–49	St. Louis	60	.307	**.558**	–	**2.5**	**5.7**
1949–50	St. Louis	**66**	.325	.494	–	2.0	5.5
1950–51	Philadelphia	7	**.333**	.333	**1.3**	.3	.9
Career		133	.316	.522	1.3	2.1	5.4

=== Playoffs ===
Year	Team	GP	FG%	FT%	RPG	APG	PPG
1949	St. Louis	2	.385	.000	–	3.0	5.0
Career		2	.385	.000	–	3.0	5.0
