= Milt Schoon =

American basketball player (1922–2015)

Personal information
- Born: February 25, 1922 Gary, Indiana, U.S.
- Died: January 18, 2015 (aged 92) Janesville, Wisconsin, U.S.
- Listed height: 6 ft 7 in (2.01 m)
- Listed weight: 230 lb (104 kg)

Career information
- High school: Calumet (Gary, Indiana)
- College: Trine (1941–1942); Valparaiso (1943–1946)
- Playing career: 1946–1951
- Position: Center

Career history
- 1946–1947: Detroit Falcons
- 1947–1948: Flint Dow Chemicals
- 1948–1950: Sheboygan Red Skins
- 1950–1951: Denver Refiners
- Stats at NBA.com
- Stats at Basketball Reference

Milton W. Schoon (February 25, 1922 – January 18, 2015) was an American professional basketball player.

A 6-foot-7, 230-pound center, Schoon began his college career at Tri-State College (now Trine University) during the 1941–42 season before going on to play at Valparaiso University during the 1940s, gaining fame for his ability to defend top-ranked player George Mikan of DePaul University. Schoon then played professionally in the BAA, NBL, NBA, and NPBL as a member of the Anderson Packers, Detroit Falcons, Flint Dow Chemicals, Sheboygan Redskins and Denver Refiners.

Schoon was the last full-time player surviving from the Sheboygan Red Skins' 1949–50 NBA team. He platooned with Noble Jorgensen at center and played in all 62 games for the Red Skins that season, averaging eight points and shooting a team-best 41 percent from the field. Sheboygan's greatest conquests that season were victories over the New York Knicks, Rochester Royals, Syracuse Nationals and Minneapolis Lakers at the Sheboygan Auditorium and Armory. The Red Skins advanced to the NBA playoffs where they nearly eliminated the Western Division champion Indianapolis Olympians in a best-of-three series.

With the NPBL's Denver Frontier-Refiners in 1951, Schoon scored 363 points in 31 games, an 11.7 point average. He set a professional basketball scoring record with 64 points in a 99–72 victory over the Kansas City Hi-Spots on Jan. 21, 1951, at the Denver Auditorium. That record is currently held by Wilt Chamberlain, who scored 100 points in a 1962 NBA game.

The Frontier-Refiners compiled an 18–16 record, but the team moved to Evansville late in the season and Schoon's professional career ended.

Schoon was elected to the Valparaiso Athletic Hall of Fame in 2000.

Schoon died on January 18, 2015, in his home in Janesville, Wisconsin.

== BAA/NBA career statistics ==
Legend
| GP | Games played | FG% | Field-goal percentage |
| FT% | Free-throw percentage | APG | Assists per game |
| PPG | Points per game | **Bold** | Career high |

=== Regular season ===
| Year | Team | GP | FG% | FT% | APG | PPG |
|---|---|---|---|---|---|---|
| 1946–47 | Detroit | 41 | .216 | .425 | .3 | 2.9 |
| 1949–50 | Sheboygan | **62** | **.410** | **.653** | **1.4** | **8.0** |
| Career | | 103 | .342 | .605 | .9 | 6.0 |

=== Playoffs ===
| Year | Team | GP | FG% | FT% | APG | PPG |
|---|---|---|---|---|---|---|
| 1949–50 | Sheboygan | 3 | .294 | .700 | 1.0 | 5.7 |
| Career | | 3 | .294 | .700 | 1.0 | 5.7 |
