= Red Rocha =

American basketball player (1923–2010)

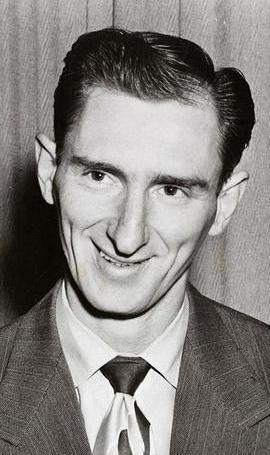
- Rocha in 1950

Personal information
- Born: September 18, 1923 Hilo, Territory of Hawaii, U.S.
- Died: February 13, 2010 (aged 86) Corvallis, Oregon, U.S.
- Listed height: 6 ft 9 in (2.06 m)
- Listed weight: 185 lb (84 kg)

Career information
- High school: Hilo (Hilo, Hawaii)
- College: Oregon State (1944–1947)
- NBA draft: 1947: 2nd round, --
- Drafted by: Toronto Huskies
- Playing career: 1947–1957
- Position: Center
- Number: 4, 6, 16
- Coaching career: 1957–1973

Career history

Playing
- 1947–1950: St. Louis Bombers
- 1950–1951: Baltimore Bullets
- 1951–1953, 1954–1956: Syracuse Nationals
- 1956–1957: Fort Wayne Pistons

Coaching
- 1957–1960: Detroit Pistons
- 1963–1973: Hawaii

Career highlights
- NBA champion (1955); 2× NBA All-Star (1951, 1952); Second-team All-American – Helms (1947); Third-team All-American – Helms (1946); 3× All-PCC (1945–1947)

Career BAA and NBA statistics
- Points: 6,362 (10.9 ppg)
- Rebounds: 2,747 (6.6 rpg)
- Assists: 1,153 (2.0 apg)
- Stats at NBA.com
- Stats at Basketball Reference

Ephraim Joseph "Red" Rocha (September 18, 1923 – February 13, 2010) was an American professional basketball player and coach.

== Basketball ==
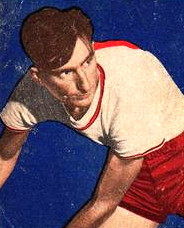
Rocha, circa 1948

A 6'9" center from Oregon State University, he earned All-Pacific Coast Conference honors in 1945, 1946, and 1947. He was also selected as a 1947 All-American.

Rocha played in the Basketball Association of America (BAA)and National Basketball Association (NBA) in the late 1940s and early 1950s. He represented the Baltimore Bullets in the 1951 NBA All-Star Game, the first NBA All-Star Game. Rocha had 6,362 career points in the NBA and won an NBA title with the Syracuse Nationals in 1955. The first person from Hawaii to play in the NBA, Rocha still shares, with former teammate Paul Seymour, the NBA record for most minutes in a playoff game with 67.

After his playing days he became a coach, including head coach of the Detroit Pistons from 1958 to 1960. Rocha also coached the Hawaii Chiefs of the American Basketball League. Rocha then became head coach for the University of Hawaii men's basketball team. At UH, he assembled what is known today as the "Fabulous Five" during the 1970 to 1972 seasons. In 1970, the team advanced to postseason play for the first time in school history. Red also co-founded the Rainbow Classic — an eight-team collegiate men's basketball tournament, with UH hosting the tournament.

== Later years ==
He was inducted into the Oregon Sports Hall of Fame in 1980, and into the Oregon State University Sports Hall of Fame in 1990. Ephraim "Red" Rocha died from cancer on February 13, 2010, in Corvallis, Oregon, at the age of 86.

== BAA/NBA career statistics ==
Legend
GP	Games played	GS	Games started	MPG	Minutes per game
FG%	Field goal percentage	3P%	3-point field goal percentage	FT%	Free throw percentage
RPG	Rebounds per game	APG	Assists per game	SPG	Steals per game
BPG	Blocks per game	PPG	Points per game	**Bold**	Career high
†	Won an NBA championship

=== Regular season ===
Year	Team	GP	MPG	FG%	FT%	RPG	APG	PPG
1947–48	St. Louis	48	–	.314	.690	–	.8	12.7
1948–49	St. Louis	58	–	.389	.768	–	**2.7**	10.5
1949–50	St. Louis	65	–	**.405**	.703	–	2.4	11.8
1950–51	Baltimore	64	–	.352	**.809**	8.0	2.3	**13.1**
1951–52	Syracuse	66	**38.5**	.401	.770	**8.3**	1.9	12.9
1952–53	Syracuse	69	35.6	.388	.755	7.4	2.0	11.2
1954–55†	Syracuse	**72**	34.3	.368	.782	6.8	2.5	11.3
1955–56	Syracuse	**72**	26.2	.361	.783	5.8	1.8	10.0
1956–57	Fort Wayne	**72**	16.0	.349	.757	3.8	1.1	5.3
Career		586	29.9	.370	.759	6.6	2.0	10.9

=== Playoffs ===
Year	Team	GP	MPG	FG%	FT%	RPG	APG	PPG
1948	St. Louis	7	–	.246	.733	–	.9	11.4
1949	St. Louis	2	–	**.444**	.800	–	3.0	**18.0**
1952	Syracuse	7	39.4	.432	.725	6.9	1.4	17.0
1953	Syracuse	2	**53.5**	.385	.786	**8.5**	**3.5**	15.5
1955†	Syracuse	**11**	33.7	.418	.759	6.7	1.3	12.4
1956	Syracuse	8	23.6	.338	**.846**	6.5	1.9	8.5
1957	Fort Wayne	2	9.0	.000	.667	3.0	.0	2.0
Career		39	32.0	.360	.758	6.6	1.5	12.2

== Head coaching record ==
Team	Year	G	W	L	W–L%	Finish	PG	PW	PL	PW–L%	Result
Detroit	1957–58	47	24	23	.511	2nd in Western	7	3	4	.429	Lost in Western division finals 1–4
Detroit	1958–59	62	28	44	.389	3rd in Western	3	1	2	.333	Lost in Western Division semifinals 1–2
Detroit	1959–60	34	13	21	.382	—	—	—	—	—	—
Career		153	65	88	.425		10	4	6	.400	
