= Bob Dille =

American basketball player and coach

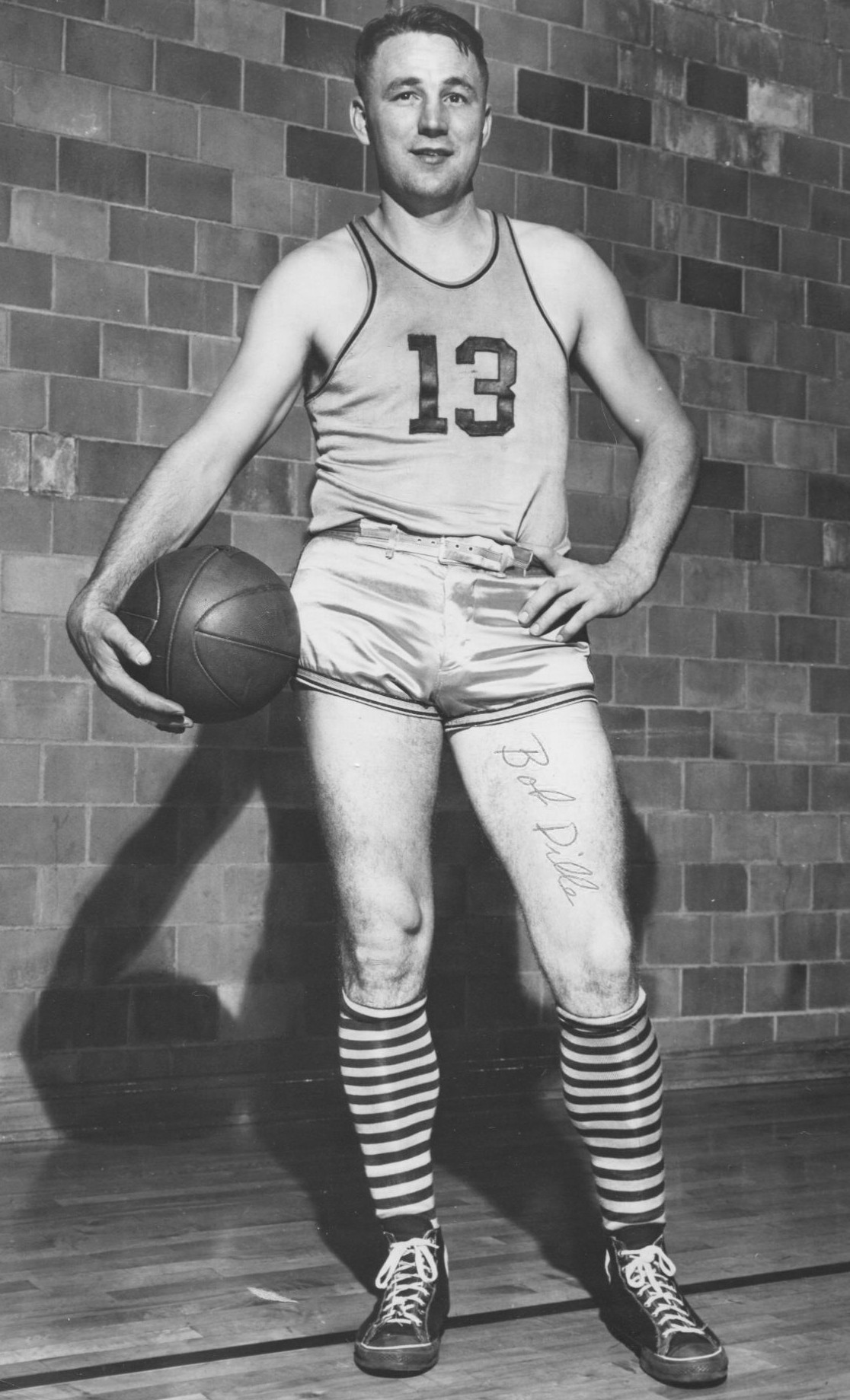

Personal information
- Born: July 2, 1917 Chesterton, Indiana, U.S.
- Died: December 10, 1998 (aged 81)
- Listed height: 6 ft 3 in (1.91 m)
- Listed weight: 190 lb (86 kg)

Career information
- High school: Chesterton (Chesterton, Indiana)
- College: Valparaiso (1943–1946)
- Playing career: 1940–1947
- Position: Forward
- Number: 62

Career history

Playing
- 1940: Hammond Ciesar All-Americans
- 1946–1947: Detroit Falcons

Coaching
- 1947–1948: Valparaiso (assistant)

Career highlights
- Consensus second-team All-American (1944); Second–team All-American – Helms, SN (1945)

Career statistics
- Points: 296
- Assists: 40
- Stats at NBA.com
- Stats at Basketball Reference

Robert Orville Dille (July 2, 1917 – December 10, 1998) was an American professional basketball player and championship high school coach. Dille was an All-American forward at Valparaiso, where he was a member of "The World's Tallest Team" and later coached Fort Wayne's Northrop High School to an Indiana state championship in 1974. He was inducted into the Indiana Basketball Hall of Fame in 1989.

Dille starred at Chesterton High School in Chesterton, Indiana and matriculated at Valparaiso University as a 26-year-old with a wife and son. He played varsity basketball while working 48 hours a week at a local company in addition to his full courseload. In 1944, Dille was named Valparaiso's first nationally recognized All-American.

Following his collegiate career, Dille played for the Detroit Falcons of the Basketball Association of America, averaging 5.2 points per game in his lone season with the club.

Dille was an assistant coach for Valparaiso University during the 1947–48 season, and he later coached high school basketball in his home state of Indiana. He coached at Valparaiso High School, Berne-French Township High School and Fort Wayne North before taking the reins at Fort Wayne Northrop in 1971. Dille coached at Northrop for seven years, winning a state championship in 1974.

== BAA career statistics ==
Legend
GP	Games played
FG%	Field-goal percentage
FT%	Free-throw percentage
APG	Assists per game
PPG	Points per game

=== Regular season ===
Year	Team	GP	FG%	FT%	APG	PPG
1946–47	Detroit	57	.197	.667	.7	5.2
Career		57	.197	.667	.7	5.2
