= Bill Roberts (basketball) =

American basketball player

Personal information
- Born: March 13, 1925 Fort Wayne, Indiana, U.S.
- Died: January 23, 2016 (aged 90) DeKalb, Illinois, U.S.
- Listed height: 6 ft 8 in (2.03 m)
- Listed weight: 210 lb (95 kg)

Career information
- College: Wyoming (1945–1946)
- Playing career: 1947–1951
- Position: Center
- Number: 11, 5, 3

Career history
- 1947–1948: Atlanta Crackers
- 1948: Chicago Stags
- 1948–1949: Boston Celtics
- 1949–1950: St. Louis Bombers
- 1950–1951: Scranton Miners
- 1950–1951: Louisville Alumnites
- Stats at NBA.com
- Stats at Basketball Reference

William Joseph Roberts (March 13, 1925 – January 23, 2016) was an American professional basketball player. He was born in Fort Wayne, Indiana.

He was awarded a varsity letter to play college basketball for the Wyoming Coyboys for the 1945–46, helping the team to a Mountain States Athletic Conference (MSAC) conference title and an NCAA tournament appearance. The Cowboys were 22–4 with a MSAC record of 10–2. His Basketball Association of America (BAA) and National Basketball Association (NBA) career lasted from 1948 to 1950.

After his playing retirement, Roberts worked for Reynolds Aluminium in McCook, Illinois, until 1973. He relocated to Indiana and opened a confectionery store with his wife. Roberts returned to Illinois and settled in DeKalb, where he died on January 23, 2016.

== BAA/NBA career statistics ==
Legend
GP	Games played	FG%	Field-goal percentage
FT%	Free-throw percentage	APG	Assists per game
PPG	Points per game	**Bold**	Career high

=== Regular season ===
Year	Team	GP	FG%	FT%	APG	PPG
1948–49	Chicago	2	.333	.000	.0	1.0
1948–49	Boston	26	.330	.474	.5	3.1
1948–49	St. Louis	22	.335	**.795**	**1.3**	**6.3**
1949–50	St. Louis	**67**	**.347**	.718	.4	2.7
Career		117	.339	.706	.6	3.5

=== Playoffs ===
Year	Team	GP	FG%	FT%	APG	PPG
1949	St. Louis	2	.345	.400	1.0	11.0
Career		2	.345	.400	1.0	11.0
