= Philip Sachs =

American basketball coach (1902–1973)

- Pictured in the January 1982 edition of Michigan Jewish History journal

Personal information
- Born: April 1, 1902 Russia
- Died: December 19, 1973 (aged 71) Detroit, Michigan

Career history

Coaching
- 1936–1940: Lawrence Tech
- 194?–1946: Detroit Gems
- 1946–1947: Detroit Falcons

Career highlights
- As coach: Michigan–Ontario League champion (1938); 7× Michigan AAU champion

Philip "Cincy" Sachs (April 1, 1902 – December 19, 1973) was an American basketball interim head coach for the Detroit Falcons, a Basketball Association of America team, in 1946–47. After taking over the team from Glenn M. Curtis, Sachs posted an 8–18 win-loss record while in charge of the Falcons. Prior to coaching in the BAA, he had spent time coaching the Detroit Gems before they entered the National Basketball League.

Sachs was born in Russia and moved to Cincinnati, Ohio, around 1904. His interest in basketball grew as a child, and in August 1917 his family moved to Detroit, Michigan. In 1919 he began his head coaching career; his first-ever team went 30–1 and lost in the Amateur Athletic Union (AAU) championship game. Between 1936 and 1940, Sachs coached the Lawrence Institute of Technology team. In his first season they placed second in the Michigan–Ontario League, and in his second year they tied for first place. His overall record at Lawrence Tech was 56–28.

In Sachs' post-BAA years, he started a boys' basketball school, promoted tournaments, and worked full-time at the Griswold Sporting Goods Company. He also coached the teams who the Harlem Globetrotters would play against, even winning some on occasion. His cumulative overall head coaching record (including high school, AAU, semi-professional, and professional) was 782–158, a winning percentage of .832. He died in Detroit on December 19, 1973, never having married.

== Head coaching record ==
=== Professional ===
Legend
Regular season	G	Games coached	W	Games won	L	Games lost	W–L %	Win–loss %
Playoffs	PG	Playoff games	PW	Playoff wins	PL	Playoff losses	PW–L %	Playoff win–loss %

Team	Year	G	W	L	W–L%	Finish	PG	PW	PL	PW–L%	Result
DET	1946–47	26	8	18	.308	4th in Western	0	0	0	.000	Missed Playoffs
Career		26	8	18	.308		0	0	0	.000	
