= Grady Lewis =

American basketball player (1917–2009)

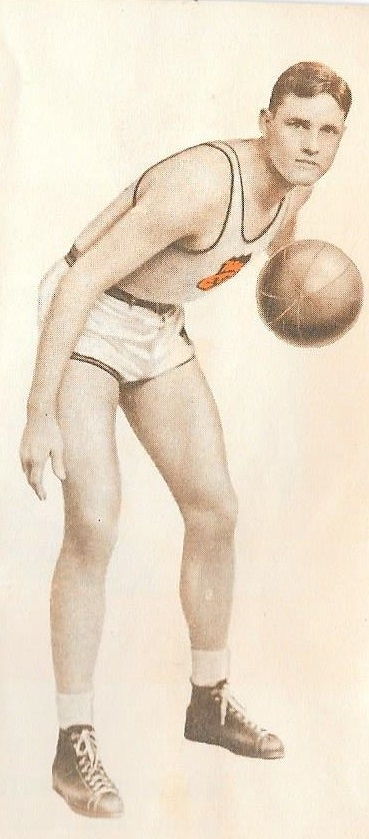
- Lewis with the Phillips 66ers

Personal information
- Born: March 25, 1917 Boyd, Texas, U.S.
- Died: March 11, 2009 (aged 91) Peoria, Arizona, U.S.
- Listed height: 6 ft 7 in (2.01 m)
- Listed weight: 215 lb (98 kg)

Career information
- College: Southwestern Oklahoma State; Oklahoma
- Playing career: 1939–1949
- Position: Forward / center
- Number: 66, 7, 6, 35, 13
- Coaching career: 1958–1960

Career history

Playing
- 1939–1942: Phillips 66ers
- 1946–1947: Detroit Falcons
- 1947–1948: St. Louis Bombers
- 1948: Baltimore Bullets
- 1948–1949: St. Louis Bombers

Coaching
- 1948–1950: St. Louis Bombers

Career highlights
- BAA champion (1948)

Career BAA statistics
- Points: 750 (5.4 ppg)
- Assists: 132 (0.9 apg)
- Stats at NBA.com
- Stats at Basketball Reference

Grady William Lewis (March 25, 1917 – March 11, 2009) was an American professional basketball player.

He played college basketball for the Southwestern Oklahoma State Bulldogs and Oklahoma Sooners. Lewis played four seasons with the Phillips 66 Oilers of the AAU, and three seasons (1946–1949) in the Basketball Association of America as a member of the Detroit Falcons, St. Louis Bombers, and Baltimore Bullets. He averaged 5.4 points per game in his career and won a league championship with Baltimore in 1948. Lewis also was a member of two AAU national championship teams with Phillips 66 (1940, 1946).

Lewis coached the St. Louis Bombers during the 1948–49 and 1949–50 seasons. He then worked for the Converse shoe company. Lewis went on to invent the Converse All Stars shoe, although he did not get recognition as the famous Marketer Chuck Taylor was accredited due to his popular name. Lewis was inducted into the Southwestern Oklahoma State Hall of Fame in 1970.

== BAA career statistics ==
Legend
GP	Games played	GS	Games started	MPG	Minutes per game
FG%	Field goal percentage	3P%	3-point field goal percentage	FT%	Free throw percentage
RPG	Rebounds per game	APG	Assists per game	SPG	Steals per game
BPG	Blocks per game	PPG	Points per game	**Bold**	Career high
†	Won an NBA championship

=== Regular season ===
Year	Team	GP	FG%	FT%	APG	PPG
1946–47	Detroit	**60**	.204	.543	.9	4.8
1947–48	St. Louis	24	.248	**.667**	.5	6.9
1947–48†	Baltimore	21	.294	.619	**1.3**	**7.1**
1948–49	St. Louis	34	**.387**	.600	1.1	4.4
Career		139	.252	.595	.9	5.4

=== Playoffs ===
Year	Team	GP	FG%	FT%	APG	PPG
1948†	Baltimore	11	.211	.759	.8	6.2
Career		11	.211	.759	.8	6.2

== Head coaching record ==
Legend
Regular season	G	Games coached	W	Games won	L	Games lost	W–L %	Win–loss %
Playoffs	PG	Playoff games	PW	Playoff wins	PL	Playoff losses	PW–L %	Playoff win–loss %

Team	Year	G	W	L	W–L%	Finish	PG	PW	PL	PW–L%	Result
St. Louis	1948–49	60	29	31	.483	4th in BAA Western	2	0	2	.000	Lost in Division Semifinal
St. Louis	1949–50	68	26	42	.382	5th in NBA Central	—	—	—	—	Missed playoffs
Career		128	55	73	.430		2	0	2	.000	
