= Art Stolkey =

American basketball player

Personal information
- Born: October 23, 1920 Fenton, Michigan, U.S.
- Died: December 31, 2013 (aged 93) Scottsdale, Arizona, U.S.
- Listed height: 6 ft 1 in (1.85 m)
- Listed weight: 180 lb (82 kg)

Career information
- College: Detroit Mercy
- Playing career: 1946–1948
- Position: Guard
- Number: 44

Career history
- 1946–1947: Detroit Falcons
- 1947–1948: Grand Rapids Rangers
- Stats at NBA.com
- Stats at Basketball Reference

Arthur Francis Stolkey (October 23, 1920 – December 31, 2013) was an American professional basketball player. He played in 26 games for the Basketball Association of America's Detroit Falcons in the 1946–47 season. Stolkey scored 102 points in his BAA career.

== BAA career statistics ==
Legend
GP	Games played
FG%	Field-goal percentage
FT%	Free-throw percentage
APG	Assists per game
PPG	Points per game

=== Regular season ===
Year	Team	GP	FG%	FT%	APG	PPG
1946–47	Detroit	23	.220	.682	1.7	4.4
Career		23	.220	.682	1.7	4.4
