= Valparaiso Beacons men's basketball =

College basketball team

2026–27 Valparaiso Beacons men's basketball team
- University: Valparaiso University
- Head coach: Roger Powell Jr. (4th season)
- Location: Valparaiso, Indiana
- Arena: Athletics-Recreation Center (capacity: 5,432)
- Conference: Missouri Valley
- Nickname: Beacons
- Colors: Brown and gold

NCAA Division I tournament Elite Eight
- 1962*, 1967*
Other NCAA Division I tournament results
Sweet Sixteen	1962*, 1966*, 1967*, 1969*, 1973*, 1998
Appearances	1962*, 1966*, 1967*, 1969*, 1973*, 1996, 1997, 1998, 1999, 2000, 2002, 2004, 2013, 2015

Conference tournament champions
- Mid-Continent Conference; 1995, 1996, 1997, 1998, 1999, 2000, 2002, 2004 Horizon League; 2013, 2015

Conference regular-season champions
- Mid-Continent Conference; 1995, 1996, 1997, 1998, 1999, 2001, 2002, 2003, 2004 Horizon League; 2012, 2013, 2015, 2016, 2017

Uniforms
Home	Away	Alternate
- * at Division II level

Butler–Valparaiso rivalry
- Sport: Men's basketball
- Teams: Butler Bulldogs; Valparaiso Beacons
- First meeting: 1934–35; Butler 41, Valparaiso 25
- Latest meeting: March 3, 2012; Valparaiso 65, Butler 46
- Trophy: none

Statistics
- Total meetings: 103
- All-time series: Butler leads, 67–36
- Largest victory: Valparaiso, 85–49 (1945–46)
- Longest win streak: Butler, 15 (1957–1964)
- Current win streak: Valparaiso: 4 wins (2011–12)

The Valparaiso Beacons men's basketball team represents Valparaiso University in Valparaiso, Indiana. The basketball team competes in the Missouri Valley Conference, having joined that league in 2017 after 10 seasons in the Horizon League. The Beacons play in the Athletics-Recreation Center, which has a nominal capacity of 5,432. The record capacity 5,444 was reached on March 23, 2016, in the NIT Quarterfinal. The team last played in the NCAA Division I men's basketball tournament in 2015.

Its sports teams formerly were named the Crusaders, but the university dropped that name and associated mascot and logos in 2021, because of the "negative connotation and violence associated with the Crusader imagery", and because of its use by certain hate groups. On August 10, 2021, the school announced that its sports teams would be known as Beacons.

== History ==
=== The beginning ===
The Crusaders' first game was in 1917 as an independent school.

=== The tallest team ===
Valpo's "World's Tallest Team" was actually a collection of teams that gained Valparaiso national recognition during World War II and began in 1942 when a pair of Michigan City, Indiana brothers, Don and Wally Warnke, joined Valpo when their high school coach, Loren Ellis, was hired as head coach. At 6 ft 10 in (2.08 m) tall, the Warnke brothers were ineligible to be drafted into the service. Ellis found several other tall players, including Milt Schoon. Valparaiso did well with the Warnke brothers before Wally was able to enlist and fight in World War II. In 1943, his brother, Don, stayed and was joined by a group of newcomers, including Schoon, Bob Dillie, John Janisch and Alvin Schmidt, as they finished with 17 wins, including a win over No. 1 DePaul in which Schoon held George Mikan to nine points.

Warnke would graduate following the season, but would return as an assistant coach and later the head coach after Ellis left. In the 1944–45 season. The team won its first 11 games, including a program-defining victory over Long Island at Madison Square Garden. Despite finishing 21–3 on the season, the Crusaders were held out of the National Invitation Tournament, with their spot likely going to Midwest powers DePaul and/or Bowling Green.

The iconic photograph of Valparaiso's players standing outside Madison Square Garden is displayed just outside the Athletics-Recreation Center court to this day. The team was inducted into the Valparaiso University Hall of Fame in 2004.

=== Success in the 1950s and 1960s ===
The Crusaders joined the Indiana Collegiate Conference for the 1950–51 season. The Crusaders advanced to the NCAA College Division basketball tournament — the forerunner of both the NCAA Division II tournament and NCAA Division III tournament — for the first time in 1962.

In 1964, Gene Bartow took over as head coach at Valpo and led the Crusaders to the greatest stretch of basketball in school history. In 1966, the Crusaders returned to the College Division tournament, losing in the Regional semifinals.

In 1967, Valpo again returned to the College Division tournament, beating Southern Colorado (now Colorado State–Pueblo) and again advancing to the Elite Eight before losing to Southwest Missouri State (now Missouri State). In 1969, they hosted a College Division tournament game for the first time, beating Concordia of Illinois before losing to Illinois State.

In 1970, Bartow left Valpo to coach Memphis State. In 1973 under Bill Purden, the Crusaders notched their final appearance in the College Division tournament, advancing to the Regional finals before losing to Kentucky Wesleyan.

=== Division I ===
The Crusaders joined Division I before the 1978–79 season. After four years as an independent, they became charter members of the Association of Mid-Continent Universities, which would go on to be known as the Mid-Continent Conference before becoming The Summit League. Valpo struggled mightily in their early years of Division I play, never having a winning record until 1994.

=== Homer Drew and sons' Valpo dynasty ===
In 1988, Homer Drew took the job as head coach. That first season included a win over 19th-ranked Notre Dame in a game that came to be known as "The Lutheran Miracle". After struggling early under coach Homer Drew, the Crusaders became a conference power beginning with the 1993–94 season where they finished second. The Crusaders won their first Mid-Continent championship in 1995, led by star player Bryce Drew. However, the team was not invited to the NCAA tournament. The Crusaders won the 1996 conference championship and received their first invitation to the Division I NCAA tournament. In the 1998 tournament, the Crusaders won their only Tournament games, defeating Ole Miss on a last second shot by Bryce Drew. The shot would go on to be an iconic play in NCAA Tournament history. The Crusaders won their second-round game against Florida State before losing in the Sweet Sixteen to Rhode Island.

The Crusaders won the Mid-Continent Conference's automatic bid to the NCAA Tournament every year from 1996 through 2000. In 2001, though the Crusaders won the regular season championship, they lost to Southern Utah in the conference tournament. Valpo returned to the NCAA tournament the following year, losing to Kentucky in the first round. Homer Drew resigned the following season and his son, Scott Drew, an eight-year assistant under his father, was named head coach.

Scott would lead the Crusaders to another regular season championship, but failed to win the conference tournament and settled for an NIT appearance. After one year as head coach, Scott was hired to take over as coach at Baylor following that school's basketball scandal. Homer Drew returned to coach the team to the NCAA Tournament again in 2004. In 2007, Valparaiso became a member of the Horizon League.

The Crusaders played in the title game of the Mid-Continent Conference tournament every year between 1995 and 2004. After three more years as head coach, Drew resigned again and his son and former Valpo star Bryce Drew was named head coach. In five years as coach for the Crusaders, Bryce led them to a postseason appearance every year, including the NCAA Tournament in 2013 and 2015. Following the 2016 season, Bryce was hired to take over at Vanderbilt.

Under Homer, Scott, and Bryce Drew, the Crusaders won 13 regular season conference championships and 10 conference tournament championships. The Crusaders appeared in nine NCAA Tournaments, three NITs, two CollegeInsider.com Postseason Tournaments, and one College Basketball Invitational in 26 years.

=== The post-Drew years ===
On April 7, 2016, the school promoted former assistant coach Matt Lottich to the head coach position following Bryce Drew accepting the head coaching position at Vanderbilt on April 6, 2016. For the first time since 1988, a Drew was not the head coach at Valpo. In Lottich's first season, the Crusaders earned a share of the Horizon League regular season championship, but lost in the Horizon League tournament. They received a bid to the NIT where they lost in the first round.

Following the season, Valparaiso agreed to join the Missouri Valley Conference after 10 years as a member of the Horizon League. The Crusaders were invited to replace Wichita State which left the league to join the American Athletic Conference.

On April 7, 2023, Roger Powell Jr. was hired as the new head coach for Valparaiso. In August 2024, Lottich was hired as Associate Head Coach at Brown University.

== Postseason ==
=== NCAA tournament results ===
The Beacons have appeared in nine NCAA Tournaments. Their combined record is 2–9.

Year	Seed	Round	Opponent	Result
1996	No. 14	First Round	No. 3 Arizona	L 51–90
1997	No. 12	First Round	No. 5 Boston College	L 66–73
1998	No. 13	First Round; Second Round; Sweet Sixteen	No. 4 Ole Miss; No. 12 Florida State; No. 8 Rhode Island	W 70–69; W 83–77^{OT} L 68–74
1999	No. 15	First Round	No.2 Maryland	L 60–82
2000	No. 16	First Round	No. 1 Michigan State	L 38–65
2002	No. 13	First Round	No. 4 Kentucky	L 68–83
2004	No. 15	First Round	No. 2 Gonzaga	L 49–76
2013	No. 14	Second Round	No. 3 Michigan State	L 54–65
2015	No. 13	Second Round	No. 4 Maryland	L 62–65

=== NCAA Division II tournament results ===
The Beacons have appeared in the NCAA Division II tournament five times. Their combined record is 7–5.

Year	Round	Opponent	Result
1962	Regional semifinals Regional finals Elite Eight	Kentucky State; Concordia (IL); Sacramento State	W 75–61; W 75–72; L 54–61
1966	Regional semifinals Regional finals	Saint Procopius; North Dakota	W 107–76; L 82–112
1967	Regional semifinals Regional finals Elite Eight	Colorado State–Pueblo; Indiana State; Missouri State	W 89–52; W 80–77; L 72–86
1969	Regional semifinals Regional finals	Concordia (IL); Illinois State	W 91–81; L 87–103
1973	Regional semifinals Regional finals	Capital; Kentucky Wesleyan	W 69–64; L 66–74

=== NAIA tournament results ===
The Beacons have appeared in the NAIA tournament two times. Their combined record is 1–2.

Year	Round	Opponent	Result
1938	First Round; Second Round	Western Oregon; Central Missouri	W 57–48; L 24–44
1943	First Round	Eastern Washington	L 42–45

=== NIT results ===
The Beacons have appeared in the National Invitation Tournament (NIT) four times. Their combined record is 4–4.

Year	Round	Opponent	Result
2003	Opening Round	Iowa	L 60–62
2012	First Round	Miami	L 50–66
2016	First Round; Second Round; Quarterfinals; Semifinals; Championship Game	Texas Southern; Florida State; Saint Mary's; BYU; George Washington	W 84–73; W 81–69; W 60–44; W 72–70; L 60–76
2017	First Round	Illinois	L 57–82

=== CBI results ===
The Beacons have appeared in the College Basketball Invitational (CBI) one time. Their record is 1–1.

Year	Round	Opponent	Result
2008	First Round; Quarterfinals	Washington; Houston	W 72–71; L 67–91

=== CIT results ===
The Beacons have appeared in the CollegeInsider.com Postseason Tournament (CIT) two times. Their combined record is 0–2.

Year	Round	Opponent	Result
2011	First Round	Iona	L 77–85
2014	First Round	Columbia	L 56–58

== Radio ==
All Beacon games are broadcast for free on the Valparaiso website at valpoathletics.com. WVUR-FM, the student-run campus radio station, also broadcasts select Beacon games on 95.1 FM and on the station's website.

== Retired numbers ==
Valparaiso Beacons retired jerseys
No.	Player	Career	No. ret.	Ref.
24	Bryce Drew	1994–1998	2014	
24	Bruce Lindner	1967–1970	2014	

== Beacons in the NBA ==
- Don Bielke
- Bob Dille
- Bryce Drew
- John Janisch
- Milt Schoon
- Alec Peters
- Ryan Broekhoff
