= Howie McCarty =

American basketball player

Personal information
- Born: April 15, 1919 Port Huron, Michigan, U.S.
- Died: August 2, 2000 (aged 81)
- Listed height: 6 ft 2 in (1.88 m)
- Listed weight: 190 lb (86 kg)

Career information
- High school: Port Huron (Port Huron, Michigan)
- College: Wayne State (1938–1940)
- Position: Guard / forward
- Number: 55

Career history

Playing
- 1945–1946: Cleveland Allmen Transfers
- 1946: Detroit Falcons
- 1946–1947: Detroit Gems

Coaching
- 1945–1946: Lawrence Tech
- Stats at NBA.com
- Stats at Basketball Reference

Howard Jerry McCarty (April 15, 1919 – August 2, 2000) was an American professional basketball player. He played in the National Basketball League for the Cleveland Allmen Transfers and Detroit Falcons, as well as in the Basketball Association of America for the Detroit Gems.

McCarty played college basketball for Wayne State University. During his college career, he was noted as one of few players to play with glasses without a special eye guard.

== Coaching career ==
McCarty coached St. Gregory High School in 1942–1943. In 1945, he was hired as the head coach of the Lawrence Technological University.

== Military ==
After college, McCarty served in the Military Police of the United States Army. He was discharged in 1945.

== BAA career statistics ==
Legend
GP	Games played
FG%	Field-goal percentage
FT%	Free-throw percentage
APG	Assists per game
PPG	Points per game

=== Regular season ===
Year	Team	GP	FG%	FT%	APG	PPG
1946–47	Detroit	19	.122	.100	.1	1.1
Career		19	.122	.100	.1	1.1
