= Lonnie Eggleston =

American basketball player

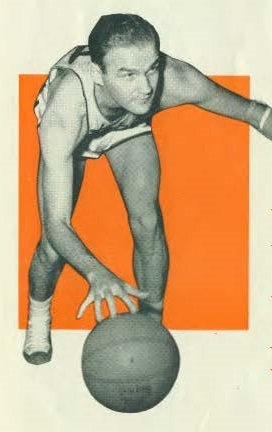
- Eggleston with the Phillips 66ers.

Personal information
- Born: June 8, 1918 Dodd City, Texas
- Died: July 10, 1998 (aged 80)
- Listed height: 6 ft 0 in (1.83 m)
- Listed weight: 170 lb (77 kg)

Career information
- High school: Walters (Walters, Oklahoma)
- College: Oklahoma State (1938–1942)
- Position: Guard
- Number: 5

Career history
- 1948–1949: St. Louis Bombers
- Stats at NBA.com
- Stats at Basketball Reference

Lonnie J. Eggleston (June 8, 1918 – July 10, 1998) was an American professional basketball player. He spent one season in the Basketball Association of America (BAA) as a member of the St. Louis Bombers during the 1948–49 season. He attended Oklahoma State University.

== BAA career statistics ==
Legend
GP	Games played	FG%	Field-goal percentage
FT%	Free-throw percentage	APG	Assists per game
PPG	Points per game

=== Regular season ===
Year	Team	GP	FG%	FT%	APG	PPG
1948–49	St. Louis	2	.250	.667	.5	2.0
Career		2	.250	.667	.5	2.0
