= George Pearcy =

American basketball player

Personal information
- Born: July 2, 1919 Martinsville, Indiana, U.S.
- Died: September 14, 1992 (aged 73) Martinsville, Indiana, U.S.
- Listed height: 6 ft 1 in (1.85 m)
- Listed weight: 165 lb (75 kg)

Career information
- High school: Martinsville (Martinsville, Indiana)
- College: Indiana State (1939–1942)
- Position: Guard
- Number: 34

Career history
- 1946–1947: Detroit Falcons
- Stats at NBA.com
- Stats at Basketball Reference

George William "Wig" Pearcy (July 2, 1919 – September 14, 1992) was an American professional basketball player. He played in 37 games for the Detroit Falcons of the Basketball Association of America in the 1946–47 season. He recorded 94 points, 13 assists, and 68 personal fouls in his career. George is the older brother of Henry Pearcy, who also played for the Falcons that season.

== BAA career statistics ==
Legend
GP	Games played
FG%	Field-goal percentage
FT%	Free-throw percentage
APG	Assists per game
PPG	Points per game

=== Regular season ===
Year	Team	GP	FG%	FT%	APG	PPG
1946–47	Detroit	37	.238	.727	.4	2.5
Career		37	.238	.727	.4	2.5
