= Harold Johnson (basketball) =

American basketball player

Personal information
- Born: January 30, 1920 Richmond, Indiana, U.S.
- Died: September 17, 1999 (aged 79)
- Listed height: 6 ft 6 in (1.98 m)
- Listed weight: 240 lb (109 kg)

Career information
- High school: Morton (Richmond, Indiana)
- College: Indiana State (1939–1942)
- Position: Center
- Number: 8, 33

Career history
- 1946–1947: Detroit Falcons
- Stats at NBA.com
- Stats at Basketball Reference

Harold Harmon Johnson (January 30, 1920 – September 17, 1999) was an American professional basketball player. He played in the Basketball Association of America for the Detroit Falcons in the first year of the league's existence (1946–47) and averaged 0.6 points per game.

A three-year letterman for the Indiana State Sycamores, "Big Stoop" led the Sycamores to the 3rd round of the 1942 NAIA Tournament. The "Fightin' Trees' dropped a close game to the eventual champions, the Hamline Pipers.

Following World War II, he joined his former college coach Glenn Curtis in the BAA with the Detroit Falcons. Following his professional basketball career, Johnson began a law enforcement career as an Indiana State Trooper.

== BAA career statistics ==
Legend
GP	Games played
FG%	Field-goal percentage
FT%	Free-throw percentage
APG	Assists per game
PPG	Points per game

=== Regular season ===
Year	Team	GP	FG%	FT%	APG	PPG
1946–47	Detroit	27	.200	.500	.4	.6
Career		27	.200	.500	.4	.6
