= Chet Aubuchon =

American basketball player

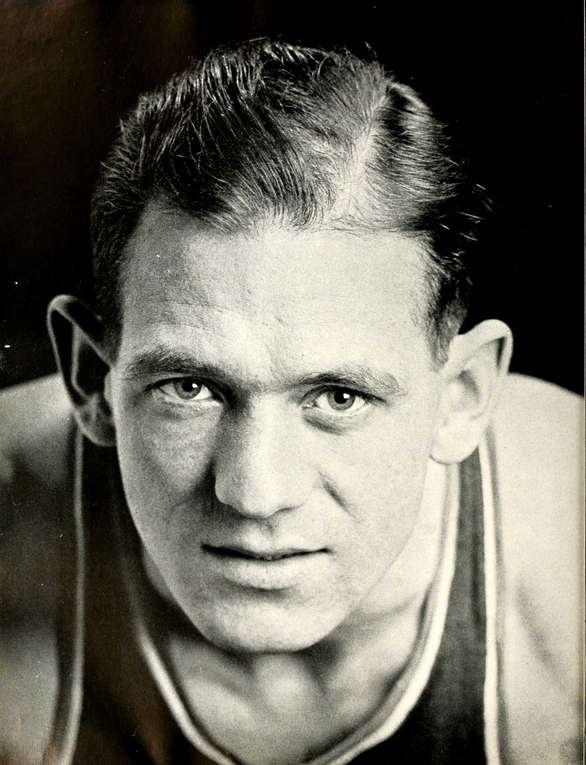
- Aubuchon in 1942

Personal information
- Born: May 8, 1916 Gary, Indiana, U.S.
- Died: April 14, 2005 (aged 88)
- Listed height: 5 ft 10 in (1.78 m)
- Listed weight: 137 lb (62 kg)

Career information
- High school: Horace Mann (Gary, Indiana)
- College: Michigan State (1938–1942)
- Playing career: 1946–1947
- Position: Guard
- Number: 98

Career history

Playing
- 1946–1947: Detroit Falcons

Coaching
- 1949–1950: Michigan State (assistant)

Career highlights
- Third-team All-American – Converse (1940)
- Stats at NBA.com
- Stats at Basketball Reference

Chester Joseph Aubuchon Jr. (May 18, 1916 – April 14, 2005) was an American professional basketball player. He played college basketball for the Michigan State Spartans and was the first player to be named an All-American in program history.

Aubuchon played one season for the Detroit Falcons in the Basketball Association of America (BAA). He served as an assistant coach for Michigan State for one season before becoming a teacher, coach, and administrator at schools in Michigan.

== Early life ==
Aubuchon was raised in Gary, Indiana, as one of nine children. His father died when he was aged 11 and he was raised by his mother.

Aubuchon attended Horace Mann High School in Gary. He served as a team captain and was selected for the all-state team.

== College career ==
Aubuchon entered Michigan State University in 1937. He formed a contingent known as the Gary Gang with fellow Gary residents Bob Phillips and Max Hindman. Aubuchon began receiving national attention as a junior and earned the nickname "The Houdini of the Hardcourt". He was the first Spartans player to be named an All-American.

While working in a campus electrical shop in 1940, Aubuchon scratched his finger and it became infected. He suffered from blood poisoning and required blood transfusions to keep him alive. Aubuchon was in the hospital for six months and spent another six months recuperating before being able to play again. He returned to the Spartans for the 1941–42 season as team captain.

After graduating from Michigan State, Aubuchon served four years in the United States Navy. He spent 27 months in the South Pacific war zones during World War II.

== Professional career ==
Aubuchon played briefly for the Detroit Falcons of the Basketball Association of America (BAA) in the 1946–47 season. He served as an assistant coach for the Spartans during the 1949–50 season under Al Kircher.

Aubuchon coached at high schools in Owosso and Holly, Michigan. He moved to Port Huron, Michigan, in 1954 to coach at Port Huron Junior College, where he also served as an athletic director, teacher, and dean of men. Aubuchon was appointed as the dean of student personnel when Port Huron Junior College became St. Clair County Community College in 1967. Aubuchon retired in 1976 and moved to Ruskin, Florida, where he died in 2005.

== Legacy ==
Aubuchon was inducted into the Port Huron Sports Hall of Fame in 1978, the Michigan State Hall of Fame in 1996, and the Indiana Basketball Hall of Fame in 1998.

== BAA career statistics ==
Legend
GP	Games played
FG%	Field-goal percentage
FT%	Free-throw percentage
APG	Assists per game
PPG	Points per game

=== Regular season ===
Year	Team	GP	FG%	FT%	APG	PPG
1946–47	Detroit	30	.253	.543	.7	2.2
Career		30	.253	.543	.7	2.2
