= John Janisch =

American basketball player

Personal information
- Born: March 15, 1920 La Porte, Indiana, U.S.
- Died: August 29, 1992 (aged 72) West Branch, Michigan, U.S.
- Listed height: 6 ft 3 in (1.91 m)
- Listed weight: 200 lb (91 kg)

Career information
- College: Valparaiso (1943–1946)
- Playing career: 1946–1948
- Position: Forward / guard
- Number: 52, 17

Career history
- 1946–1947: Detroit Falcons
- 1947: Boston Celtics
- 1947: Providence Steamrollers
- 1947–1948: Flint Dow A.C.'s
- Stats at NBA.com
- Stats at Basketball Reference

John Albert Janisch (March 15, 1920 – August 29, 1992) was an American professional basketball player. Janisch played for the Detroit Falcons, Boston Celtics, and Providence Steamrollers in the Basketball Association of America. He also played for the Flint Dow A.C.'s in the National Basketball League.

== BAA career statistics ==
Legend
GP	Games played	FG%	Field-goal percentage
FT%	Free-throw percentage	APG	Assists per game
PPG	Points per game	**Bold**	Career high

=== Regular season ===
Year	Team	GP	FG%	FT%	APG	PPG
1946–47	Detroit	**60**	.288	**.662**	**.8**	**11.6**
1947–48	Boston	3	.143	.500	.0	1.0
1947–48	Providence	7	**.302**	.571	.3	4.9
Career		70	.288	.654	.7	10.5
