= 1949–50 St. Louis Bombers season =

- Head coach: Grady Lewis
- Arena: Kiel Auditorium; St. Louis Arena

Results
- Record: 26–42 (.382)
- Place: Division: 5th (Central)
- Playoff finish: Did not qualify
- Stats at Basketball Reference
- Radio: WIL and WTMV

The 1949–50 St. Louis Bombers season was the fourth and final season for the Bombers in the National Basketball Association. This season would technically be considered the only season in the Bombers' history where they would officially play in the NBA properly after previously playing their first three seasons in the precursor league known as the Basketball Association of America (BAA) before it officially merged with the older, rivaling National Basketball League (NBL) to become the present-day NBA (though they would still only participate in the 1949 BAA draft while failing to participate in the subsequent 1950 NBA draft soon afterward due to a failed $50,000 bond payment made to enter the 1950–51 NBA season following the completion of the 1950 NBA playoffs). While Grady Lewis would retire as a professional basketball player to try to become a full-time head coach for St. Louis, the Bombers would end up having their worst season in their entire history when they got realigned into the shortly-formed Central Division (which was a division that would not be created again until the 1970–71 NBA season when the NBA would return to the size that it would be under its first season under the NBA name properly) alongside the Chicago Stags and the original three NBL-turned-BAA-turned-NBA franchises in the Fort Wayne Pistons, Rochester Royals, and the two-time defending champion Minneapolis Lakers. This would result in the Bombers having the worst record in the temporarily short-lived division's history with a 26–42 losing record, which not only gave St. Louis their worst record in franchise history, but also ended with them having their only season where they failed to qualify for the NBA Playoffs and being the only team in that division to have a losing record there altogether. The franchise ceased operations after the season, and the St. Louis market would be left without an NBA team until 1955.

== BAA/NBA draft ==
Round	Pick	Player	Position(s)	Nationality	College/Club Team
T (1)	– (5)	Ed Macauley	PF/C	United States	Saint Louis
2	15	Johnny Orr	SF	United States	Beloit College
3	27	Marv Schatzman	SF	United States	Saint Louis
4	38	Preston Ward	SG/SF	United States	Missouri State
5	47	Earl Dodd	SF	United States	Northeast Missouri State
6	54	Dave "Jack" Davidson	SG	United States	Stanford
7	60	John Pritchard	PF/C	United States	Drake
8	66	Claude "Bob" Retherford	SG	United States	Nebraska
9	69	Cliff "Joe" Crandall	SG/SF	United States	Oregon State
10	71	Eddie Van Zant	–	United States	Northwestern State College

This ultimately became the last draft the St. Louis Bombers would ever participate in. They were initially slated to be a part of the 1950 NBA draft, which would be the debut NBA draft to utilize the proper NBA name following the merger of the Basketball Association of America that the Bombers were in with the National Basketball League, but the Bombers would ultimately fold operations the day before the 1950 NBA draft began, with four other teams also leaving the NBA around this time to create a short-lived rivaling basketball league of their own.

== Roster ==
St. Louis Bombers 1949–50 roster
Players
Coaches

Pos.	#	Name	Ht.	Wt.	From
G	7	Johnny Logan	6 ft 2 in (1.88 m)	175 lb (79 kg)		Indiana
F/C	50	Ed Macauley	6 ft 8 in (2.03 m)	185 lb (84 kg)		Saint Louis
F	11	Ariel Maughan	6 ft 4 in (1.93 m)	190 lb (86 kg)		Utah State
G	14	Mike McCarron	5 ft 11 in (1.80 m)	180 lb (82 kg)		Seton Hall
G	9	Dermie O'Connell	6 ft 0 in (1.83 m)	174 lb (79 kg)		Holy Cross
F	12	Johnny Orr	6 ft 3 in (1.91 m)	195 lb (88 kg)		Beloit
F/C	14	Mac Otten	6 ft 7 in (2.01 m)	220 lb (100 kg)		Bowling Green
G/F	6	Easy Parham	6 ft 3 in (1.91 m)	200 lb (91 kg)		Texas Wesleyan
G	8	Don Putman	6 ft 1 in (1.85 m)	170 lb (77 kg)		Denver
C	3	Roberts, Bill	6 ft 9 in (2.06 m)	210 lb (95 kg)		Wyoming
F/C	4	Red Rocha	6 ft 9 in (2.06 m)	185 lb (84 kg)		Oregon State
G/F	10	Belus Smawley	6 ft 1 in (1.85 m)	195 lb (88 kg)		Appalachian State
F/C	9	Mike Todorovich	6 ft 5 in (1.96 m)	220 lb (100 kg)		Wyoming
G	5	D. C. Wilcutt	6 ft 2 in (1.88 m)	165 lb (75 kg)		Saint Louis

Head coach
- Grady Lewis

Legend
- (DP) Unsigned draft pick
- (FA) Free agent
- (S) Suspended
- Injured

== Regular season ==
=== Season standings ===
Central Division	W	L	PCT	GB	Home	Road	Neutral	Div
x-Minneapolis Lakers	51	17	.750	–	30–1	18–16	3–0	16–8
x-Rochester Royals	51	17	.750	–	33–1	17–16	1–0	15–9
x-Fort Wayne Pistons	40	28	.588	11	28–6	12–22	–	14–10
x-Chicago Stags	40	28	.588	11	18–6	14–21	8–1	11–13
St. Louis Bombers	26	42	.382	25	17–14	7–26	2–2	4–20

=== Game log ===
1949–50 Game log
#	Date	Opponent	Score	High points	Record
1	November 1	vs Tri-Cities	72–51	Johnny Logan (21)	1–0
2	November 3	at Baltimore	81–65	Mike Todorovich (19)	2–0
3	November 4	at Philadelphia	58–79	Ed Macauley (15)	2–1
4	November 5	at Washington	69–81	Ed Macauley (19)	2–2
5	November 8	at Anderson	62–70	Johnny Logan (18)	2–3
6	November 10	Syracuse	73–67	Logan, Macauley (23)	3–3
7	November 12	at Indianapolis	71–94	Red Rocha (20)	3–4
8	November 13	Chicago	65–91	Belus Smawley (12)	3–5
9	November 16	at Minneapolis	71–94	Belus Smawley (16)	3–6
10	November 17	Minneapolis	78–65	Red Rocha (24)	4–6
11	November 20	Rochester	95–74	Johnny Logan (22)	5–6
12	November 24	Baltimore	63–65	Belus Smawley (16)	5–7
13	November 26	at Anderson	63–73	Ed Macauley (18)	5–8
14	November 27	Philadelphia	80–67	Belus Smawley (20)	6–8
15	November 30	at Tri-Cities	89–82	Ed Macauley (19)	7–8
16	December 1	New York	68–85	Belus Smawley (20)	7–9
17	December 3	at Sheboygan	75–72	Maughan, Rocha (18)	8–9
18	December 4	Boston	85–76	Logan, Smawley (17)	9–9
19	December 7	at Denver	76–72	Belus Smawley (27)	10–9
20	December 10	at Baltimore	66–69	Ed Macauley (25)	10–10
21	December 14	at Washington	61–79	Johnny Orr (12)	10–11
22	December 15	at Boston	81–83	Rocha, Smawley (18)	10–12
23	December 16	at Philadelphia	68–54	Belus Smawley (17)	11–12
24	December 17	at New York	76–81 (2OT)	Belus Smawley (20)	11–13
25	December 21	New York	75–52	Red Rocha (19)	12–13
26	December 22	at Fort Wayne	75–87	Belus Smawley (22)	12–14
27	December 25	Washington	68–81	Johnny Logan (24)	12–15
28	December 29	Baltimore	90–63	Belus Smawley (15)	13–15
29	December 31	at Rochester	68–87	Ed Macauley (21)	13–16
30	January 1	Waterloo	91–79	Johnny Logan (24)	14–16
31	January 4	Boston	72–68	Johnny Logan (20)	15–16
32	January 5	at Fort Wayne	83–87	Red Rocha (20)	15–17
33	January 8	Rochester	73–75 (2OT)	Johnny Logan (18)	15–18
34	January 12	Minneapolis	73–89	Ed Macauley (22)	15–19
35	January 15	Denver	89–83	Ed Macauley (25)	16–19
36	January 16	at Chicago	69–78	Ed Macauley (23)	16–20
37	January 18	at Waterloo	69–80	Ed Macauley (14)	16–21
38	January 19	Fort Wayne	74–64	Red Rocha (19)	17–21
39	January 22	Boston	71–47	Logan, Rocha, Smawley (14)	18–21
40	January 24	vs Washington	67–75	Johnny Logan (23)	18–22
41	January 25	at Minneapolis	78–85	Red Rocha (16)	18–23
42	January 26	Washington	71–82	Red Rocha (18)	18–24
43	January 29	Chicago	51–66	Belus Smawley (14)	18–25
44	February 2	New York	73–87	Maughan, Smawley (13)	18–26
45	February 5	Indianapolis	76–64	Ed Macauley (29)	19–26
46	February 7	at Rochester	84–90	Ed Macauley (34)	19–27
47	February 8	at New York	84–82 (2OT)	Macauley, Smawley (17)	20–27
48	February 9	at Baltimore	67–79	Belus Smawley (12)	20–28
49	February 10	at Boston	79–89	Macauley, Rocha (20)	20–29
50	February 12	Philadelphia	86–70	Belus Smawley (23)	21–29
51	February 16	Minneapolis	71–72	Belus Smawley (17)	21–30
52	February 19	Sheboygan	72–65	Logan, Macauley (19)	22–30
53	February 22	at Minneapolis	57–100	Logan, Macauley (11)	22–31
54	February 23	Fort Wayne	72–74	Ed Macauley (20)	22–32
55	February 24	at Chicago	62–77	Red Rocha (20)	22–33
56	February 26	Rochester	79–81	Ed Macauley (31)	22–34
57	March 1	Fort Wayne	70–75	Ed Macauley (23)	22–35
58	March 2	at Fort Wayne	61–91	Red Rocha (19)	22–36
59	March 5	Philadelphia	71–67	Ed Macauley (18)	23–36
60	March 8	at New York	78–80 (OT)	Ed Macauley (24)	23–37
61	March 9	at Syracuse	74–85	Ed Macauley (20)	23–38
62	March 10	at Philadelphia	73–78	Belus Smawley (25)	23–39
63	March 11	at Washington	90–92	Ed Macauley (21)	23–40
64	March 12	at Rochester	72–99	Ed Macauley (20)	23–41
65	March 14	at Boston	86–76	Ed Macauley (31)	24–41
66	March 16	Baltimore	71–63	Ed Macauley (22)	25–41
67	March 17	vs Chicago	85–69	Ed Macauley (35)	26–41
68	March 19	Chicago	64–80	Ed Macauley (24)	26–42

== Dispersal Draft ==
After the Bombers folded their franchise officially the day before the 1950 NBA draft began on April 24, 1950 (the same day the likes of the original Denver Nuggets, Sheboygan Red Skins, and Waterloo Hawks all withdrew from the NBA in order to join up with the Anderson Packers (who previously withdrew from the NBA themselves on April 10, 1950 following pressure from bigger marketplace teams like the Knicks, Celtics, and Warriors) to create the short-lived rivaling National Professional Basketball League as a means for them to all try and survive together), the St. Louis franchise would join the Packers players (who had previously withdrawn from the NBA before creating the NPBL with the other three teams that withdrew on the same day the Bombers folded) in a dispersal draft that the NBA held on August 25, 1950 as the first of three different dispersal drafts held during the 1950–51 NBA season period. In the Bombers' case, they were the only team from the initial April 24, 1950 deadline to not post a $50,000 bond to the NBA by the newly-established league's deadline and not defect themselves into the newer, rivaling National Professional Basketball League soon afterward. The following teams acquired these players from the Bombers during the dispersal draft period.

- Baltimore Bullets: Bill Roberts & Red Rocha
- Boston Celtics: Ed Macauley
- Minneapolis Lakers: Mac Otten
- Philadelphia Warriors: Easy Parham
- Tri-Cities Blackhawks: Johnny Logan
- Washington Capitols: Ariel Maughan & Don Putman
