= Tom King (basketball) =

American basketball player

Personal information
- Born: March 9, 1924; Cincinnati, Ohio, U.S.
- Died: November 12, 2015 (aged 91)
- Listed height: 6 ft 0 in (1.83 m)
- Listed weight: 165 lb (75 kg)

Career information
- High school: East Lansing (East Lansing, Michigan)
- College: Michigan (1943–1944)
- Playing career: 1946–1947
- Position: Guard
- Number: 11

Career history
- 1946–1947: Detroit Falcons
- Stats at NBA.com
- Stats at Basketball Reference

Thomas Van Dyke King (March 9, 1924 – November 12, 2015) was an American professional basketball player. He played a season for the Detroit Falcons of the Basketball Association of America (BAA), the league that would later become the modern NBA.

After a college career at the University of Michigan, King signed with the Falcons in 1946. King (who would later prove successful in business) negotiated roles as publicity director, business manager and travelling secretary for the team. This combination of duties netted him an annual salary of $16,500, making him the highest paid player in the league, despite averaging only 5.1 points per game on the season.

King was married to Canadian figure skater and Olympic gold medallist, Barbara Ann Scott.

== BAA career statistics ==
Legend
GP	Games played
FG%	Field-goal percentage
FT%	Free-throw percentage
APG	Assists per game
PPG	Points per game

=== Regular season ===
Year	Team	GP	FG%	FT%	APG	PPG
1946–47	Detroit	58	.237	.631	.6	5.1
Career		58	.237	.631	.6	5.1
