= Harold Brown (basketball) =

American basketball player

Personal information
- Born: October 2, 1923 Indiana, U.S.
- Died: September 1980 (aged 56)
- Listed height: 6 ft 0 in (1.83 m)
- Listed weight: 155 lb (70 kg)

Career information
- College: Evansville (1941–1942, 1944–1946)
- Playing career: 1946–1948
- Position: Guard
- Number: 24

Career history
- 1946–1947: Detroit Falcons
- 1947–1948: Kansas City Blues
- Stats at NBA.com
- Stats at Basketball Reference

Harold Vernon Brown (October 2, 1923 – September 1980) was an American professional basketball player.

He played collegiately for the University of Evansville from 1941 to 1942 and 1944 to 1946.

He played for the Detroit Falcons in the Basketball Association of America (BAA) for 54 games during the 1946–47 season, and the Kansas City Blues of the Professional Basketball League of America (PBLA) during the 1947–48 season.

== BAA career statistics ==
Legend
GP	Games played
FG%	Field-goal percentage
FT%	Free-throw percentage
APG	Assists per game
PPG	Points per game

=== Regular season ===
Year	Team	GP	FG%	FT%	APG	PPG
1946–47	Detroit	54	.248	.632	.7	4.9
Career		54	.248	.632	.7	4.9
