= 1948–49 St. Louis Bombers season =

- Head coach: Grady Lewis
- Arena: St. Louis Arena

Results
- Record: 29–31 (.483)
- Place: Division: 4th (Western)
- Playoff finish: West Division Semifinals (eliminated 0-2)
- Stats at Basketball Reference

Local media
- Television: KSD-TV
- Radio: WIL and WTMV

The 1948–49 BAA season was the Bombers' 3rd season in the NBA/BAA. This would also become the team's first season without head coach Ken Loeffler leading the way for the Bombers, with them now being led by new player-coach Grady Lewis (who previously played for the Bombers the previous season before being a part of the recent BAA champion Baltimore Bullets) for the rest of the franchise's existence. Under a combination of a coaching philosophy change from Ken Loeffler to Grady Lewis and a divisional shift in the Basketball Association of America (BAA) following the additions of four of the teams from the rivaling National Basketball League (NBL) in the former NBL champion Minneapolis Lakers, Rochester Royals, Fort Wayne Pistons, and Indianapolis Jets led to the Bombers finishing with a below-average 29–31, though they still qualified for the 1949 BAA playoffs, where they were swept by the Rochester Royals in the Western Division Semifinals. Following the conclusion of this season, the Bombers were one of ten BAA teams (removing only the former NBL turned BAA Indianapolis Jets and the Providence Steamrollers teams) to join up with six of the surviving nine NBL teams (with an expansion team in the Indianapolis Olympians also being added) to create the present-day National Basketball Association.

== Draft ==
Round	Pick	Player	Position	Nationality	College
1	7	Bob Gale	C	United States	Cornell
2	19	Jack Burmaster	G	United States	Illinois
3	31	Easy Parham	G/F	United States	Texas Wesleyan
4	43	D. C. Wilcutt	G	United States	Saint Louis
5	55	Gordon Flick	–	United States	Drake
6	67	John Hoppin	–	United States	Dickinson
7	78	Dan London	–	United States	Washington State
8	88	Daniel Miller	–	United States	Saint Louis

== Roster ==
1948–49 St. Louis Bombers roster
Players

Pos.	No.	Player	Height	Weight	DOB	From
G	5	Lonnie Eggleston	6 ft 0 in (1.83 m)	170 lb (77 kg)	1918-06-08	Oklahoma State
F	12	Coulby Gunther	6 ft 4 in (1.93 m)	190 lb (86 kg)	1923-02-05	Boston College
F/C	13	Grady Lewis	6 ft 7 in (2.01 m)	215 lb (98 kg)	1917-03-25	Oklahoma
G	7	Johnny Logan	6 ft 2 in (1.88 m)	175 lb (79 kg)	1921-01-01	Indiana
F/C	14	Don Martin	6 ft 7 in (2.01 m)	210 lb (95 kg)	1920-02-07	Central Missouri
F	11	Ariel Maughan	6 ft 4 in (1.93 m)	190 lb (86 kg)	1923-04-26	Utah State
F	13	Bill Miller	6 ft 3 in (1.91 m)	190 lb (86 kg)	1924-11-24	North Carolina
F	3	Bob O'Brien	6 ft 4 in (1.93 m)	190 lb (86 kg)	1927-01-26	Pepperdine
G	9	Buddy O'Grady	5 ft 11 in (1.80 m)	160 lb (73 kg)	1920-01-19	Georgetown
G/F	6	Easy Parham	6 ft 3 in (1.91 m)	200 lb (91 kg)	1921-12-27	Texas Wesleyan
G	8	Don Putman	6 ft 1 in (1.85 m)	170 lb (77 kg)	1922-11-13	Denver
C	3	Bill Roberts	6 ft 9 in (2.06 m)	210 lb (95 kg)	1926-03-29	Wyoming
C	4	Red Rocha	6 ft 9 in (2.06 m)	185 lb (84 kg)	1923-09-18	Oregon State
F/C	12	Giff Roux	6 ft 5 in (1.96 m)	195 lb (88 kg)	1923-06-28	Kansas
G/F	9	Otto Schnellbacher	6 ft 4 in (1.93 m)	185 lb (84 kg)	1923-04-15	Kansas
SG	10	Belus Smawley	6 ft 1 in (1.85 m)	195 lb (88 kg)	1918-03-20	Appalachian State
G	3	D. C. Wilcutt	6 ft 2 in (1.88 m)	165 lb (75 kg)	1928-01-30	Saint Louis

Coaches
Head coach

Grady Lewis

Legend
- (DP) Unsigned draft pick
- (FA) Free agent
- (S) Suspended
- Injured

Roster

== Regular season ==
=== Season standings ===
#	Western Division				
#	Team	W	L	PCT	GB
1	x-Rochester Royals	45	15	.750	–
2	x-Minneapolis Lakers	44	16	.733	1
3	x-Chicago Stags	38	22	.633	7
4	x-St. Louis Bombers	29	31	.483	16
5	Fort Wayne Pistons	22	38	.367	23
6	Indianapolis Jets	18	42	.300	27

=== Game log ===
#	Date	Opponent	Score	High points	Record
1	November 1	@ Indianapolis	80–84	Logan, Parham (18)	0–1
2	November 6	Fort Wayne	65–55	Easy Parham (15)	1–1
3	November 9	New York	60–56	Ariel Maughan (13)	2–1
4	November 13	Philadelphia	76–75	Red Rocha (18)	3–1
5	November 16	Boston	79–74 (OT)	Maughan, Rocha (15)	4–1
6	November 19	vs Baltimore	82–72	Ariel Maughan (18)	5–1
7	November 20	Baltimore	64–85	Red Rocha (14)	5–2
8	November 25	Providence	84–82	Red Rocha (22)	6–2
9	November 27	Minneapolis	71–87	Belus Smawley (20)	6–3
10	December 1	Chicago	72–61	Belus Smawley (17)	7–3
11	December 4	Fort Wayne	76–62	Johnny Logan (21)	8–3
12	December 5	@ Minneapolis	68–78	Buddy O'Grady (18)	8–4
13	December 8	@ Fort Wayne	60–70	Johnny Logan (16)	8–5
14	December 10	vs Washington	88–83 (OT)	Belus Smawley (24)	9–5
15	December 11	@ Washington	63–87	Johnny Logan (15)	9–6
16	December 13	@ Boston	79–83 (OT)	Belus Smawley (22)	9–7
17	December 14	@ Philadelphia	61–74	Ariel Maughan (15)	9–8
18	December 16	@ Baltimore	85–82 (OT)	Johnny Logan (28)	10–8
19	December 18	@ New York	79–88	Logan, Maughan (18)	10–9
20	December 23	@ Providence	109–99	Belus Smawley (30)	11–9
21	December 25	@ Rochester	82–90	Johnny Logan (16)	11–10
22	December 26	Indianapolis	75–65	Belus Smawley (28)	12–10
23	December 30	Washington	68–81	Johnny Logan (17)	12–11
24	January 1	@ Rochester	83–106	Maughan, Smawley (17)	12–12
25	January 2	Rochester	64–89	Belus Smawley (15)	12–13
26	January 5	@ Minneapolis	76–101	Ariel Maughan (18)	12–14
27	January 8	Minneapolis	64–59	Maughan, Rocha (17)	13–14
28	January 9	@ Minneapolis	58–74	Belus Smawley (16)	13–15
29	January 12	Chicago	66–75	Ariel Maughan (16)	13–16
30	January 15	Providence	79–76	Ariel Maughan (22)	14–16
31	January 17	@ New York	79–71	Belus Smawley (26)	15–16
32	January 18	@ Boston	89–83	Belus Smawley (25)	16–16
33	January 20	Rochester	74–84	Red Rocha (16)	16–17
34	January 23	Indianapolis	73–91	Belus Smawley (19)	16–18
35	January 25	@ Indianapolis	53–65	Easy Parham (13)	16–19
36	January 28	@ Chicago	65–83	Johnny Logan (17)	16–20
37	January 29	Fort Wayne	86–73	Ariel Maughan (21)	17–20
38	February 3	Washington	65–74	Ariel Maughan (16)	17–21
39	February 6	Philadelphia	74–77 (OT)	Belus Smawley (28)	17–22
40	February 8	@ Chicago	75–73	Belus Smawley (22)	18–22
41	February 9	New York	83–95	Belus Smawley (18)	18–23
42	February 12	Baltimore	74–73	Belus Smawley (19)	19–23
43	February 15	vs New York	75–79 (OT)	Red Rocha (20)	19–24
44	February 17	Rochester	63–68	Belus Smawley (21)	19–25
45	February 19	Chicago	63–59	Belus Smawley (18)	20–25
46	February 20	@ Fort Wayne	70–64	Red Rocha (20)	21–25
47	February 23	Boston	77–83	Johnny Logan (19)	21–26
48	February 25	@ Boston	83–102	Belus Smawley (27)	21–27
49	February 26	@ Providence	93–90	Ariel Maughan (19)	22–27
50	March 1	@ Philadelphia	83–89	Logan, Smawley (18)	22–28
51	March 2	@ Washington	82–75	Rocha, Smawley (18)	23–28
52	March 3	@ Baltimore	66–94	Belus Smawley (22)	23–29
53	March 9	@ Indianapolis	81–80	Belus Smawley (21)	24–29
54	March 10	Minneapolis	88–71	Belus Smawley (25)	25–29
55	March 12	@ Rochester	74–104	Johnny Logan (15)	25–30
56	March 13	Indianapolis	87–86	Belus Smawley (23)	26–30
57	March 16	Providence	81–59	Belus Smawley (18)	27–30
58	March 17	@ Chicago	79–85	Johnny Logan (18)	27–31
59	March 19	Philadelphia	109–100	Bill Roberts (30)	28–31
60	March 20	@ Fort Wayne	87–82	Bill Roberts (22)	29–31

== BAA Playoffs ==
=== BAA West Division Semifinals ===
(1) Rochester Royals vs. (4) St. Louis Bombers: Royals win series 2-0

- Game 1 @ Rochester: Rochester 93, St. Louis 64
- Game 2 @ St. Louis: Rochester 66, St. Louis 64

Last Playoff Meeting: This is the first and only meeting between the Royals and Bombers.

== Awards and records ==
- Johnny Logan, All-NBA Second Team
