= Ariel Maughan =

American basketball player (1923–1997)

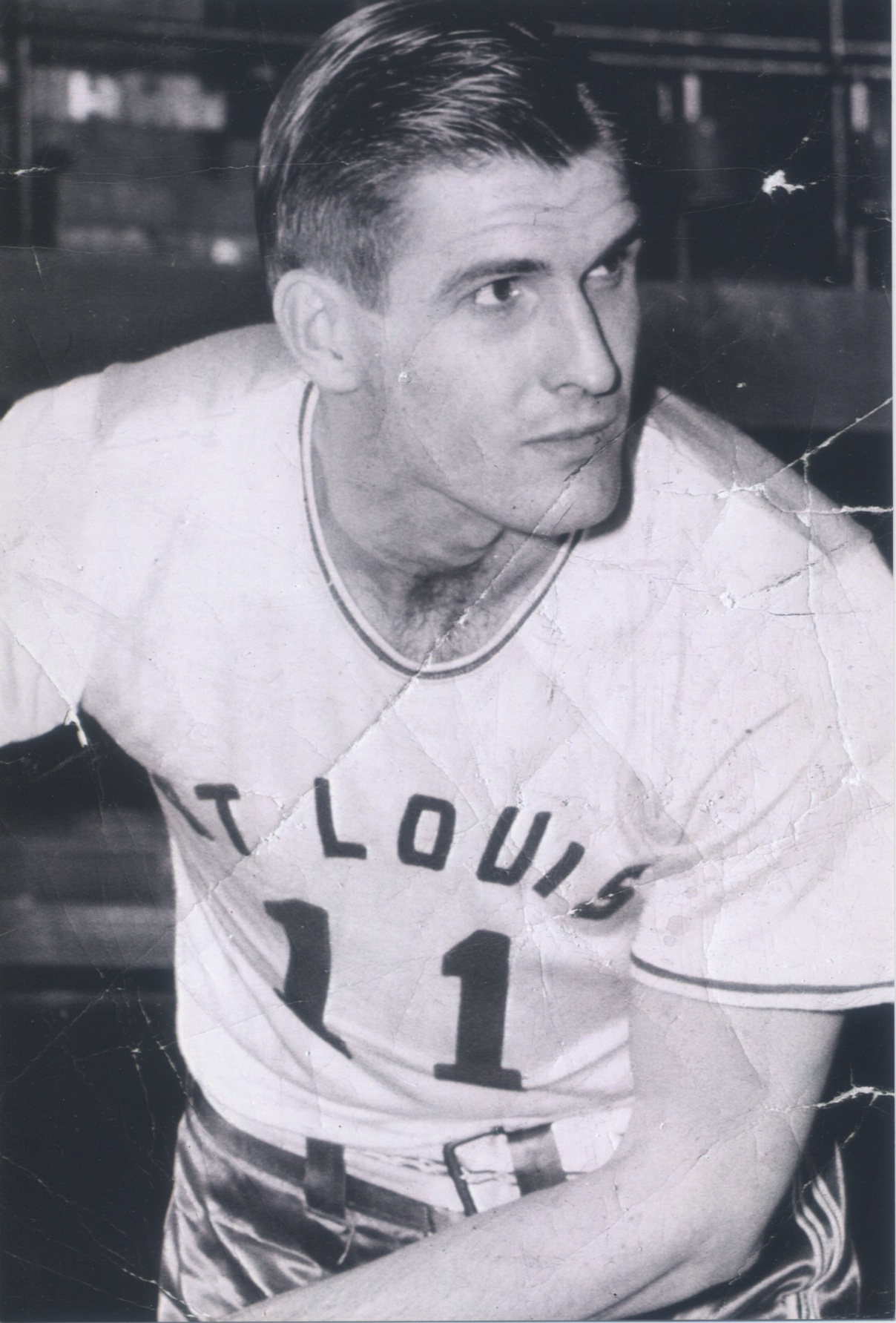
- Maughan with the St. Louis Bombers

Personal information
- Born: April 26, 1923 Salt Lake City, Utah
- Died: August 4, 1997 (aged 74) Asheville, North Carolina
- Listed height: 6 ft 4 in (1.93 m)
- Listed weight: 188 lb (85 kg)

Career information
- High school: South Cache (Hyrum, Utah)
- College: Utah State (1942–1943)
- Playing career: 1946–1951
- Position: Forward
- Number: 99, 15, 11, 12

Career history
- 1946–1947: Detroit Falcons
- 1947: Providence Steamrollers
- 1947–1950: St. Louis Bombers
- 1950–1951: Washington Capitols
- Stats at NBA.com
- Stats at Basketball Reference

Ariel Leishman Maughan (April 26, 1923 – August 4, 1997) was an American professional basketball player. Born in Salt Lake City, Utah, Maughan attended Utah State University and started his professional career in the Basketball Association of America (BAA), the National Basketball Association's (NBA) predecessor, in 1946. His career lasted five seasons and he played for four teams. Most of his points came from under the basket, although he received the nickname "Ace" for his shooting ability. However, despite the nickname, Maughan put up the worst shooting season in terms of field goal percentage by a qualified player in BAA/NBA history in the 1946–1947 season, making only 24.1% of his field goal attempts (224–929). It is not surprising that the record comes from one of the earliest seasons in BAA/NBA history, as early-mid 20th-century basketball players shot at a much lower rate compared to modern-day basketball players; the 25 lowest shooting percentage seasons by a player in BAA/NBA history all came between 1946 and 1950. In the 1948–1949 season, Maughan shot 31.7% from the field, good for 67th-worst in NBA history.

Maughan was known for being able to leap high enough to drop in the basketball with his hands above the rim. He ended his career with 2,046 points in 259 games (7.9 ppg). Ariel Maughan died on August 4, 1997, in Asheville, North Carolina, at the age of 74.

Maughan was a member of the Church of Jesus Christ of Latter-day Saints (LDS) and served in the United States Army during World War II. After his career in basketball he worked as a salesman.

Maughan's great-great grandfather was Peter Maughan, a Mormon pioneer who settled the Cache Valley in Utah while working with LDS founder Joseph Smith.

== BAA/NBA career statistics ==
Legend
GP	Games played	FG%	Field-goal percentage
FT%	Free-throw percentage	RPG	Rebounds per game
APG	Assists per game	PPG	Points per game
**Bold**	Career high

=== Regular season ===
Year	Team	GP	FG%	FT%	RPG	APG	PPG
1946–47	Detroit	59	.241	.737	–	1.0	9.0
1947–48	Providence	14	.242	.688	–	.1	3.9
1947–48	St. Louis	28	**.327**	.568	–	.1	4.6
1948–49	St. Louis	55	.317	.646	–	**1.8**	**10.8**
1949–50	St. Louis	**68**	.279	.766	–	1.5	7.0
1950–51	Washington	35	.312	**.797**	**4.0**	1.4	7.3
Career		259	.280	.712	4.0	1.2	7.9

=== Playoffs ===
Year	Team	GP	FG%	FT%	RPG	APG	PPG
1948	St. Louis	**7**	**.262**	**.696**	–	.1	**11.4**
1949	St. Louis	2	.000	.667	–	**1.5**	1.0
Career		9	.250	.692	–	.4	9.1
