= 1946–47 Detroit Falcons season =

- Head coach: Glenn M. Curtis (12–22); Philip Sachs (8–18)
- Owner(s): Arthur Wirtz & James D. Norris
- Arena: Detroit Olympia

Results
- Record: 20–40 (.333)
- Place: Division: 4th (Western)
- Playoff finish: Did not qualify
- Stats at Basketball Reference
- Radio: WXYZ

The 1946–47 BAA season was the first and only season for the Detroit Falcons in the Basketball Association of America (BAA/NBA). Originally, the Falcons were supposedly meant to play as a franchise in Indianapolis, but the Basketball Association of America opted to slot the franchise out into Detroit, Michigan before the start of the league's inaugural season. This season was also notable for having the lowest scoring effort by one team not just to start out a regular season in the BAA/NBA with 33 total points scored in a 50–33 loss to the Washington Capitols (for reference, only one other BAA team that same season would score less than 40 points in one game, with that team ironically being the Washington Capitols on January 16, 1947 against the Boston Celtics with 38 total points scored by Washington that night), but also held the record for the lowest scoring effort by a BAA/NBA team in one game until the Fort Wayne Pistons and Minneapolis Lakers (now known as the Detroit Pistons and Los Angeles Lakers respectively) had an infamous match on November 22, 1950 that resulted in a brutal to witness 19–18 Pistons victory that subsequently led to the creation of the shot clock a few seasons afterward, helping ensure that no basketball game would ever be met with such low-scoring affairs ever again in a professional manner. After finishing with a 20–40 record, the Falcons were one of the four original BAA teams to disband following the conclusion of the first ever BAA/NBA season. Greater details on their first and only season would be explored in Charley Rosen's book called "The First Tip-Off: The Incredible Story of the Birth of the NBA", with an entire chapter dedicated to the Falcons' woes and troubles in their only season of play within the BAA that ultimately lead them to their quick downfall following their only season, including how a lack of care from Arthur Wirtz and James D. Norris' ownership group (likely due to them being more focused with the Detroit Red Wings in the National Hockey League (NHL) instead of helping out the Falcons succeeding in the new BAA alongside the rest of the group's staff that were involved with the Detroit Falcons organization at that time) combined with poor quality play from the Falcons and poor competition that also involved the rivaling National Basketball League's Detroit Gems helped lead the team to their early demise. Detroit would eventually get themselves a new team a decade later in 1957 when the Fort Wayne Pistons moved to Detroit (while also keeping the Pistons name that was originally held from Fred Zollner's own company due to the city's distinction of being the Motor City) due to Fort Wayne, Indiana ultimately being considered too small for the NBA's liking despite the Pistons' best efforts on their ends.

== Roster ==
Due to this being the first and only season in the franchise's history, the BAA didn't utilize a draft system like they would in future seasons of the BAA/NBA and instead relied upon some combination of the head coach and the general manager of the team finding and signing players in time to start out their training camp period for the season. For the Falcons, the team's head coach to start out the season, Glenn M. Curtis, chose his players in a preseason practice through freelance scrimmages and noted that anybody that was either inordinately selfish as a player or caused even the least bit of dissension as a player on the team would be cut from the roster by the time the regular season began. Of the players that head coach Curtis chose to keep on the final roster to start out the regular season, he would choose to keep Tom King from the local University of Michigan (who had also considered joining the new Toledo Jeeps expansion franchise from the rivaling National Basketball League at the time), John Janisch from Valparaiso University, Ariel Maughan from Utah State University, Bob Dille from Valparaiso University, Grady Lewis (Tom King's best friend) from the University of Oklahoma, Harold Brown from Evansville University, Chet Aubuchon from the local Michigan State University, undergraduate student (at the time) Milt Schoon from Valparaiso University (who could only play on the weekends until graduating by December 1946), brothers George Pearcy and Henry Pearcy from Indiana State University, and Stan Miasek from the Textile High School in New York City (who chose to play for the Falcons over the New York Knicks due to them offering more money for his services) as the official opening season roster.

1946–47 Detroit Falcons roster
Players

Pos.	No.	Player	Height	Weight	DOB	From
G	98	Chet Aubuchon	5 ft 10 in (1.78 m)	137 lb (62 kg)	1916-05-18	Michigan State
G/F	67	Moe Becker	6 ft 1 in (1.85 m)	185 lb (84 kg)	1917-02-24	Duquesne
G	24	Harold Brown	6 ft 0 in (1.83 m)	155 lb (70 kg)	1923-10-02	Evansville
F	62	Bob Dille	6 ft 3 in (1.91 m)	190 lb (86 kg)	1917-07-02	Valparaiso
G/F	52	John Janisch	6 ft 3 in (1.91 m)	200 lb (91 kg)	1920-03-15	Valparaiso
C	8–33	Harold Johnson	6 ft 6 in (1.98 m)	240 lb (109 kg)	1920-01-30	Indiana State
G	11	Tom King	6 ft 0 in (1.83 m)	165 lb (75 kg)	1924-03-09	Michigan
F/C	7–66	Grady Lewis	6 ft 7 in (2.01 m)	215 lb (98 kg)	1917-03-25	Oklahoma
F	99	Ariel Maughan	6 ft 4 in (1.93 m)	190 lb (86 kg)	1923-04-23	Utah State
G/F	55	Howie McCarty	6 ft 2 in (1.88 m)	190 lb (86 kg)	1919-04-15	Wayne State (MI)
F/C	14–22	Stan Miasek	6 ft 5 in (1.96 m)	210 lb (95 kg)	1924-08-08	Textile HS (NY)
G	34	George Pearcy	6 ft 1 in (1.85 m)	165 lb (75 kg)	1919-07-02	Indiana State
G	44	Henry Pearcy	6 ft 1 in (1.85 m)	170 lb (77 kg)	1922-07-21	Indiana State
C	15–68	Milt Schoon	6 ft 7 in (2.01 m)	230 lb (104 kg)	1922-02-25	Valparaiso
G	44	Art Stolkey	6 ft 1 in (1.85 m)	180 lb (82 kg)	1920-10-23	Detroit Mercy

Coaches
Head coach

Philip Sachs

Legend
- (DP) Unsigned draft pick
- (FA) Free agent
- (S) Suspended
- Injured

Roster

== Regular season ==
Before the regular season even began, it was noted by Tom King that the Falcons franchise would be in grave trouble because "[w]e had a coach, a trainer, players, a gym, and uniforms, but that was about all. The Olympia Stadium was staffed with people who were very interested in ice shows and hockey teams, but not really into basketball." Not only that, but they would also oversee an incredibly long road trip that lasted for nearly a month throughout 13 games from November 27-December 26, 1946 due to the people involved with the Detroit Olympia wanting to accommodate Sonja Henie and her ice shows.

=== Season standings ===
#	Western Division				
#	Team	W	L	PCT	GB
1	x-Chicago Stags	39	22	.639	–
2	x-St. Louis Bombers	38	23	.623	1
3	x-Cleveland Rebels	30	30	.500	8.5
4	Detroit Falcons	20	40	.333	18.5
5	Pittsburgh Ironmen	15	45	.250	23.5

=== Game log ===
#	Date	Opponent	Score	High points	Record
1	November 2	Washington	L 33–50	Stan Miasek (9)	0–1
2	November 5	St. Louis	L 49–53	Stan Miasek (16)	0–2
3	November 8	@ Toronto	L 71–73	Ariel Maughan (25)	0–3
4	November 9	Boston	W 69–46	Stan Miasek (19)	1–3
5	November 13	Providence	L 68–70	John Janisch (16)	1–4
6	November 16	@ Providence	W 70–59	Harold Brown (17)	2–4
7	November 18	@ New York	L 57–61	Maughan, Miasek (14)	2–5
8	November 20	Pittsburgh	L 53–54	Bob Dille (13)	2–6
9	November 23	Boston	W 54–46	Stan Miasek (12)	3–6
10	November 24	@ Chicago	W 68–55	John Janisch (17)	4–6
11	November 26	Cleveland	W 66–46	John Janisch (22)	5–6
12	November 28	@ Philadelphia	W 68–55	John Janisch (24)	6–6
13	November 30	@ St. Louis	L 57–60 (OT)	John Janisch (21)	6–7
14	December 1	@ Cleveland	L 47–49	Ariel Maughan (11)	6–8
15	December 4	@ New York	L 57–70	John Janisch (16)	6–9
16	December 5	@ Boston	W 65–61	Stan Miasek (21)	7–9
17	December 7	@ Washington	L 64–75	John Janisch (23)	7–10
18	December 9	@ Pittsburgh	W 66–58	Stan Miasek (23)	8–10
19	December 11	@ Washington	L 66–81	John Janisch (14)	8–11
20	December 12	@ Boston	L 66–73	Stan Miasek (19)	8–12
21	December 14	@ Providence	L 66–81	Stan Miasek (28)	8–13
22	December 17	@ Philadelphia	L 49–57	Janisch, Maughan, Miasek (12)	8–14
23	December 22	@ Chicago	L 92–95	Tom King (27)	8–15
24	December 26	@ St. Louis	L 51–55	Stan Miasek (15)	8–16
25	December 29	Toronto	L 48–52	Stan Miasek (15)	8–17
26	January 1	Washington	W 62–57	Stan Miasek (17)	9–17
27	January 4	New York	L 50–62	Janisch, Miasek (11)	9–18
28	January 6	@ Toronto	L 61–76	Harold Brown (15)	9–19
29	January 8	Chicago	L 80–83	Stan Miasek (22)	9–20
30	January 11	Philadelphia	W 58–56	Maughan, Miasek (12)	10–20
31	January 15	Chicago	W 68–59	John Janisch (18)	11–20
32	January 17	@ Toronto	W 74–64	Stan Miasek (19)	12–20
33	January 20	@ Pittsburgh	L 57–62	John Janisch (14)	12–21
34	January 22	Cleveland	L 47–61	Tom King (11)	12–22
35	January 25	Philadelphia	L 55–61	Stan Miasek (14)	12–23
36	January 26	@ St. Louis	L 66–71	John Janisch (17)	12–24
37	January 29	Providence	L 73–83	Grady Lewis (18)	12–25
38	February 2	New York	W 65–63	Stan Miasek (15)	13–25
39	February 5	Washington	L 46–67	Stan Miasek (8)	13–26
40	February 8	Pittsburgh	W 64–58	John Janisch (23)	14–26
41	February 9	@ Cleveland	W 74–69	John Janisch (14)	15–26
42	February 12	Providence	W 84–64	Stan Miasek (25)	16–26
43	February 16	New York	L 58–66	Stan Miasek (21)	16–27
44	February 17	@ Pittsburgh	L 59–63	Stan Miasek (23)	16–28
45	February 19	Boston	L 51–57	Grady Lewis (14)	16–29
46	February 20	@ Chicago	W 76–74	Stan Miasek (24)	17–29
47	February 23	Toronto	W 61–52	Stan Miasek (23)	18–29
48	February 26	Chicago	L 68–72	Stan Miasek (20)	18–30
49	March 1	@ Providence	L 74–80	Stan Miasek (18)	18–31
50	March 5	@ Washington	L 67–99	Maughan, Miasek (17)	18–32
51	March 6	@ Boston	L 65–74	Stan Miasek (17)	18–33
52	March 8	@ New York	L 61–64	John Janisch (17)	18–34
53	March 12	Cleveland	L 81–89	Tom King (23)	18–35
54	March 16	Philadelphia	L 61–67	Lewis, Maughan (14)	18–36
55	March 18	St. Louis	L 59–68	Ariel Maughan (14)	18–37
56	March 20	@ Philadelphia	L 75–77	Grady Lewis (25)	18–38
57	March 22	Pittsburgh	W 85–65	Stan Miasek (20)	19–38
58	March 23	@ Cleveland	L 63–69	John Janisch (16)	19–39
59	March 26	St. Louis	L 63–67	Maughan, Miasek (16)	19–40
60	March 29	Toronto	W 66–63	Stan Miasek (17)	20–40

== Season losses ==
Throughout this season, the Detroit Falcons only had an average total of 1,239 paid attendees per game (which would become the lowest amount held by the league for a team throughout the entire season), with net receipts totaling up to $48,238 for the season and estimated losses totaling up to around $120,000 for this season. Not only that, but the lack of care from within the organization would cause team owner Arthur Wirtz to fold the Falcons franchise by July 2, 1947 after failing to properly announce to the rest of the league whether his franchise would play for another season or not, to the point where they ended up joining the Cleveland Rebels as the only other BAA franchise to miss out on participating in the inaugural 1947 BAA draft entirely on June 2, 1947, despite being the hosting site of that draft in question.

== Dispersal Draft ==
During the first ever end of season meeting for the Basketball Association of America's board of governors held on May 21, 1947, the Falcons were slated to be missing from the official missing for whether they would play for another season or not. Not only that, but the Falcons ended up joining the Cleveland Rebels as the only inaugural Basketball Association of America (BAA) teams to miss out on participating in the 1947 BAA draft (held on June 2 that year) entirely despite the inaugural BAA draft taking place in Detroit. Eventually, the Falcons decided to fold operations entirely on July 9, 1947 (exactly one month after the Cleveland Rebels officially did so). After the Falcons became the second team to officially disband as a franchise on July 9, 1947, the BAA held what would become its first ever dispersal draft on August 2 that year, with the remaining eight teams left in the BAA (the surviving seven teams from the league's first successful season alongside the original Baltimore Bullets franchise that came from the original American Basketball League by a dispute with that league) taking players that were originally from the Falcons, Cleveland Rebels, Pittsburgh Ironmen, and Toronto Huskies franchises. The following teams acquired these players from the Falcons during the dispersal draft period.

- Boston Celtics: Ariel Maughan
- Chicago Stags: Stan Miasek
- Philadelphia Warriors: Bob Dille & Milt Schoon
- St. Louis Bombers: Grady Lewis
