= Detroit Falcons (basketball) =

- Division: Western
- Founded: 1946
- Folded: 1947
- History: Detroit Falcons; 1946–1947
- Arena: Detroit Olympia
- Location: Detroit, Michigan
- Head coach: Glenn M. Curtis (12–22); Philip Sachs (8–18)
Home	Away	Third

The Detroit Falcons were a Basketball Association of America (forerunner of the National Basketball Association) team based in Detroit. It played in the inaugural 1946–47 season and folded soon after the season ended. Its demise alongside the Detroit Gems' move to Minneapolis to become the Minneapolis Lakers (now Los Angeles Lakers) left Detroit without a professional basketball team until a decade later, when the Fort Wayne Pistons moved there.

== History ==
Originally, the Falcons were slated to debut in Indianapolis alongside the rest of the other inaugural Basketball Association of America teams in its inaugural season. However, at some point before the season began for the franchise, the idea for them to play in Indianapolis was scrapped and the franchise began to play in Detroit, Michigan as the Detroit Falcons instead. The Falcons played only in the inaugural season of the BAA and finished 4th in the Western Division with a 20–40 record, 18 1/2 games out of first place. Stan Miasek was the team's star, scoring 895 points (14.9 points per game) and making the BAA's First-Team that year. Despite Detroit hosting the inaugural BAA (now NBA) draft, the Falcons would be one of two teams in the BAA to not participate in that inaugural event. Following the draft's conclusion, the Falcons would officially withdraw from the BAA on July 9, 1947, becoming the second BAA franchise to fold after the Cleveland Rebels did it a month prior on June 9. However, the BAA would later officially cancel the Falcons franchise alongside five other non-operating franchises in Buffalo and Indianapolis alongside the Cleveland Rebels, the Pittsburgh Ironmen, and the Toronto Huskies on May 10, 1948 in order to implement (potential) new spots for teams held by rivaling NBL teams like the Fort Wayne Zollner Pistons, Indianapolis Kautskys, Minneapolis Lakers, Rochester Royals, Oshkosh All-Stars, and Toledo Jeeps.

Season	GP	W	L	Pct.	Playoffs
1946–47	60	20	40	.333	Did not qualify

== Personnel ==
Head coaches

- Glenn M. Curtis (12–22)
- Philip Sachs (8–18)

Players

Name	Jersey No.	Pos.	Height (ft.)	Weight (lbs.)
Chet Aubuchon	98	G	5' 10"	137
Moe Becker	67	G-F	6' 1"	185
Harold Brown	24	G	6' 0"	155
Bob Dille	62	F	6' 3"	190
John Janisch	52	F-G	6' 3"	200
Harold Johnson	8, 33	C	6' 6"	240
Tom King	11	G	6' 0"	165
Grady Lewis	7, 66	F-C	6' 7"	215
Ariel Maughan	99	F	6' 4"	190
Howie McCarty	55	F-G	6' 2"	190
Stan Miasek	14, 22	C-F	6' 5"	210
George Pearcy	34	G	6' 1"	165
Henry Pearcy	44	G	6' 1"	170
Milt Schoon	15, 68	C	6' 7"	230
Art Stolkey	44	G	6' 1"	180
