= Stan Miasek =

American basketball player (1924–1989)

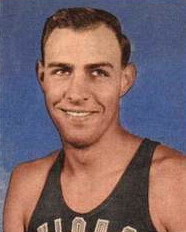
- Miasek in 1948

Personal information
- Born: August 8, 1924 New York City, New York, U.S.
- Died: October 18, 1989 (aged 65)
- Listed height: 6 ft 5 in (1.96 m)
- Listed weight: 210 lb (95 kg)

Career information
- High school: Textile High School
- Playing career: 1946–1953
- Position: Power forward / small forward
- Number: 14, 22, 23, 7, 17, 12, 3

Career history
- 1946–1947: Detroit Falcons
- 1947–1950: Chicago Stags
- 1950–1951: St. Paul Lights
- 1951: Louisville Alumnites
- 1951–1952: Baltimore Bullets
- 1952–1953: Milwaukee Hawks

Career highlights
- All-BAA First Team (1947); All-BAA Second Team (1948)

Career BAA and NBA statistics
- Points: 3,851
- Rebounds: 999
- Assists: 518
- Stats at NBA.com
- Stats at Basketball Reference

Stanley Miasek (August 8, 1924 – October 18, 1989) was an American professional basketball player.

== Career ==
A 6'5" forward, Miasek played six seasons (1946–1950; 1951–1953) in the Basketball Association of America (BAA) and National Basketball Association (NBA) as a member of the Detroit Falcons, Chicago Stags, Baltimore Bullets, and Milwaukee Hawks. He averaged 10.6 points per game and 7.6 rebounds per game in his BAA/NBA career.

Miasek was one of the early stars of the NBA (known as the Basketball Association of America until 1949). He ranked third in total points (895), fifth in total assists (93), and first in personal fouls (208) during the league's inaugural season.

=== BAA/NBA career statistics ===
Legend
GP	Games played	MPG	Minutes per game
FG%	Field-goal percentage	FT%	Free-throw percentage
RPG	Rebounds per game	APG	Assists per game
PPG	Points per game	**Bold**	Career high

==== Regular season ====
Year	Team	GP	MPG	FG%	FT%	RPG	APG	PPG
1946–47	Detroit	60	–	.287	.605	–	1.6	**14.9**
1947–48	Chicago	48	–	.303	.613	–	.6	**14.9**
1948–49	Chicago	58	–	.346	.523	–	1.0	7.8
1949–50	Chicago	**68**	–	.381	.661	–	1.1	7.3
1951–52	Baltimore	66	32.9	.365	**.707**	**9.7**	2.1	11.8
1952–53	Baltimore	25	**33.4**	**.405**	.690	8.0	**2.9**	11.3
1952–53	Milwaukee	40	18.7	.325	.566	4.0	1.3	5.7
Career		365	28.7	.330	.628	7.6	1.4	10.6

==== Playoffs ====
Year	Team	GP	MPG	FG%	FT%	RPG	APG	PPG
1948	Chicago	**5**	–	.368	.567	–	**.6**	**14.6**
1949	Chicago	2	–	.375	.636	–	.5	9.5
1950	Chicago	1	–	**.500**	**1.000**	–	.0	5.0
Career		8	–	.375	.595	–	.5	12.1
