= Golden State Warriors draft history =

This is a list of draft picks by the Golden State Warriors of the NBA. In total, the Warriors have had 465 draft picks.

== Key ==
Naismith Basketball Hall of Famer	First overall NBA draft pick	Selected for an NBA All-Star Game

== Draft picks ==
Year	League	Round	Pick	Player	College/High School/Club
2024	NBA	2	52	Quinten Post	Boston College
2023	NBA	1	19	Brandin Podziemski	Santa Clara University
2023	NBA	2	57	Trayce Jackson-Davis	Indiana University Bloomington
2022	NBA	1	28	Patrick Baldwin Jr.	University of Wisconsin–Milwaukee
2022	NBA	2	44	Ryan Rollins	University of Toledo
2022	NBA	2	55	Gui Santos	Minas
2021	NBA	1	7	Jonathan Kuminga	NBA G League Ignite
2021	NBA	1	14	Moses Moody	University of Arkansas
2020	NBA	1	2	James Wiseman	University of Memphis
2020	NBA	2	48	Nico Mannion	University of Arizona
2020	NBA	2	51	Justinian Jessup	Boise State University
2019	NBA	1	28	Jordan Poole	University of Michigan
2019	NBA	2	39	Alen Smailagić	Santa Cruz Warriors
2019	NBA	2	41	Eric Paschall	Villanova University
2018	NBA	1	28	Jacob Evans	University of Cincinnati
2017	NBA	2	38	Jordan Bell	University of Oregon
2016	NBA	1	30	Damian Jones	Vanderbilt University
2016	NBA	2	38	Patrick McCaw	University of Nevada, Las Vegas
2015	NBA	1	30	Kevon Looney	University of California, Los Angeles
2012	NBA	1	7	Harrison Barnes	University of North Carolina
2012	NBA	1	30	Festus Ezeli	Vanderbilt University
2012	NBA	2	35	Draymond Green	Michigan State University
2012	NBA	2	52	Ognjen Kuzmić	Clinicas Rincón
2011	NBA	1	11	Klay Thompson	Washington State University
2011	NBA	2	44	Charles Jenkins	Hofstra University
2010	NBA	1	6	Ekpe Udoh	Baylor University
2009	NBA	1	7	Stephen Curry	Davidson College
2008	NBA	1	14	Anthony Randolph	Louisiana State University
2008	NBA	2	49	Richard Hendrix	University of Alabama
2007	NBA	1	18	Marco Belinelli	
2007	NBA	2	36	Jermareo Davidson	University of Alabama
2007	NBA	2	46	Stéphane Lasme	University of Massachusetts Amherst
2006	NBA	1	9	Patrick O'Bryant	Bradley University
2006	NBA	2	38	Kosta Perovic	
2005	NBA	1	9	Ike Diogu	Arizona State University
2005	NBA	2	40	Monta Ellis	
2005	NBA	2	42	Chris Taft	University of Pittsburgh
2004	NBA	1	11	Andris Biedrins	
2003	NBA	1	11	Mickael Pietrus	
2003	NBA	2	40	Derrick Zimmerman	Mississippi State University
2002	NBA	1	3	Mike Dunleavy Jr.	Duke University
2002	NBA	2	29	Steve Logan	University of Cincinnati
2001	NBA	1	5	Jason Richardson	Michigan State University
2001	NBA	1	14	Troy Murphy	University of Notre Dame
2001	NBA	2	30	Gilbert Arenas	University of Arizona
2000	NBA	2	55	Chris Porter	Auburn University
1999	NBA	1	21	Jeff Foster	Texas State University
1999	NBA	2	56	Tim Young	Stanford University
1998	NBA	1	5	Vince Carter	University of North Carolina
1997	NBA	1	8	Adonal Foyle	Colgate University
1997	NBA	2	37	Marc Jackson	Temple University
1996	NBA	1	11	Todd Fuller	North Carolina State University
1996	NBA	2	40	Marcus Mann	Mississippi Valley State University
1995	NBA	1	1	Joe Smith	University of Maryland
1995	NBA	2	34	Andrew DeClercq	University of Florida
1995	NBA	2	40	Dwayne Whitfield	Jackson State University
1995	NBA	2	50	Martin Lewis	Seward County Community College
1995	NBA	2	55	Michael McDonald	University of New Orleans
1994	NBA	1	16	Clifford Rozier	University of Louisville
1994	NBA	2	39	Anthony Miller	Michigan State University
1994	NBA	2	45	Dwayne Morton	University of Louisville
1993	NBA	1	3	Penny Hardaway	University of Memphis
1993	NBA	2	34	Darnell Mee	Western Kentucky University
1992	NBA	1	24	Latrell Sprewell	University of Alabama
1992	NBA	2	43	Sasha Danilovic	
1992	NBA	2	50	Matt Fish	University of North Carolina at Wilmington
1991	NBA	1	16	Chris Gatling	Old Dominion University
1991	NBA	1	17	Victor Alexander	Iowa State University
1991	NBA	1	25	Shaun Vandiver	University of Colorado
1991	NBA	2	43	Lamont Strothers	Christopher Newport University
1990	NBA	1	11	Tyrone Hill	Xavier University
1990	NBA	2	28	Les Jepsen	University of Iowa
1990	NBA	2	34	Kevin Pritchard	University of Kansas
1989	NBA	1	14	Tim Hardaway	University of Texas at El Paso
1988	NBA	1	5	Mitch Richmond	Kansas State University
1988	NBA	2	41	Keith Smart	Indiana University
1987	NBA	1	14	Tellis Frank	Western Kentucky University
1987	NBA	3	58	Darryl Johnson	Michigan State University
1987	NBA	4	83	Benny Bolton	North Carolina State University
1987	NBA	5	105	Terry Williams	Southern Methodist University
1987	NBA	6	127	Sarunas Marciulionis	
1987	NBA	7	152	Ronnie Leggette	West Virginia State University
1986	NBA	1	3	Chris Washburn	North Carolina State University
1986	NBA	3	51	Mike Williams	Bradley University
1986	NBA	3	59	Wendell Alexis	Syracuse University
1986	NBA	4	75	Dan Bingenheimer	University of Missouri
1986	NBA	5	97	Clinton Smith	Cleveland State University
1986	NBA	6	121	Bobby Lee Hurt	University of Alabama
1986	NBA	7	143	Steve Kenilvort	Santa Clara University
1985	NBA	1	7	Chris Mullin	St. John's University
1985	NBA	2	42	Bobby Hurt	University of Alabama
1985	NBA	3	49	Brad Wright	University of California, Los Angeles
1985	NBA	4	71	Luster Goodwin	University of Texas at El Paso
1985	NBA	5	95	Greg Cavener	University of Missouri
1985	NBA	6	117	Gerald Crosby	University of Georgia
1985	NBA	7	141	Eric Boyd	North Carolina Agricultural and Technical State University
1984	NBA	2	30	Steve Burtt	Iona College
1984	NBA	2	31	Jay Murphy	Boston College
1984	NBA	2	35	Othell Wilson	University of Virginia
1984	NBA	2	45	Gary Plummer	Boston University
1984	NBA	3	55	Lewis Jackson	Alabama State University
1984	NBA	5	101	Steve Bartek	Doane College
1984	NBA	5	110	Scott McCollum	Pepperdine University
1984	NBA	6	123	Tony Martin	University of Wyoming
1984	NBA	7	147	Cliff Higgins	California State University, Northridge
1984	NBA	8	169	Paul Brozovich	University of Nevada, Las Vegas
1984	NBA	9	192	Mitch Arnold	California State University, Fresno
1984	NBA	10	213	Tim Bell	University of California, Riverside
1983	NBA	1	6	Russell Cross	Purdue University
1983	NBA	2	43	Pace Mannion	University of Utah
1983	NBA	3	53	Michael Holton	University of California, Los Angeles
1983	NBA	4	77	Peter Thibeaux	Saint Mary's College of California
1983	NBA	5	99	Greg Hines	Hampton University
1983	NBA	6	123	Tom Heywood	Weber State University
1983	NBA	7	145	Peter Williams	University of Utah
1983	NBA	8	169	Doug Harris	Central Washington University
1983	NBA	9	190	Greg Goorjiam	Loyola Marymount University
1983	NBA	10	212	Michael Zeno	California State University, Long Beach
1982	NBA	1	14	Lester Conner	Oregon State University
1982	NBA	2	35	Derek Smith	University of Louisville
1982	NBA	2	38	Wayne Sappleton	Loyola University of Chicago
1982	NBA	3	60	Chris Engler	University of Wyoming
1982	NBA	4	83	Ken Stancell	Virginia Commonwealth University
1982	NBA	5	106	Albert Irving	Alcorn State University
1982	NBA	6	129	David Vann	Saint Mary's College of California
1982	NBA	7	152	Matt Waldron	University of the Pacific
1982	NBA	8	175	Mark King	Florida Southern College
1982	NBA	9	198	Nick Morken	University of Tennessee
1982	NBA	10	219	Randy Whieldon	University of California, Irvine
1981	NBA	2	33	Sam Williams	Arizona State University
1981	NBA	3	56	Carlton Neverson	University of Pittsburgh
1981	NBA	4	76	Lewis Lloyd	Drake University
1981	NBA	4	80	Terry Adolph	West Texas A&M University
1981	NBA	5	102	Hank McDowell	University of Memphis
1981	NBA	6	126	Carter Scott	Ohio State University
1981	NBA	7	148	Robby Dosty	University of Arizona
1981	NBA	8	171	Yasutaka Okayama	
1981	NBA	9	192	Doug Murrey	San Jose State University
1981	NBA	10	213	Barry Brooks	University of Southern California
1980	NBA	1	1	Joe Barry Carroll	Purdue University
1980	NBA	1	13	Rickey Brown	Mississippi State University
1980	NBA	2	24	Larry Smith	Alcorn State University
1980	NBA	2	25	Jeff Ruland	Iona College
1980	NBA	3	49	John Virgil	University of North Carolina
1980	NBA	4	71	Robert Scott	University of Alabama
1980	NBA	5	95	Don Carlino	University of Southern California
1980	NBA	6	117	Neil Bresnahan	University of Illinois at Urbana–Champaign
1980	NBA	7	141	Lorenzo Romar	University of Washington
1980	NBA	8	162	Kurt Kanaskie	La Salle University
1980	NBA	9	182	Billy Reid	University of San Francisco
1980	NBA	10	200	Tim Higgins	University of Nebraska at Kearney
1979	NBA	2	28	Danny Salisbury	University of Texas-Pan American
1979	NBA	3	54	Cheese Johnson	Wichita State University
1979	NBA	4	75	Ron Ripley	University of Wisconsin-Green Bay
1979	NBA	4	82	Jerry Sichting	Purdue University
1979	NBA	5	96	George Lett	Centenary College of Louisiana
1979	NBA	6	118	Jim Mitchem	DePaul University
1979	NBA	7	137	Ren Watson	Virginia Commonwealth University
1979	NBA	8	155	Mario Butler	Briar Cliff University
1979	NBA	9	175	Gene Ransom	University of California
1979	NBA	10	192	Kevin Heenan	California State University, Fullerton
1978	NBA	1	5	Purvis Short	Jackson State University
1978	NBA	1	22	Raymond Townsend	University of California, Los Angeles
1978	NBA	2	40	Wayne Cooper	University of New Orleans
1978	NBA	3	56	Steve Neff	Southern Nazarene University
1978	NBA	4	77	Derrick Jackson	Georgetown University
1978	NBA	5	101	Bubba Wilson	Western Carolina University
1978	NBA	6	122	Buzz Hartnett	University of San Diego
1978	NBA	7	142	Rick Bernard	Saint Mary's College of California
1978	NBA	8	163	Tony Searcy	Appalachian State University
1978	NBA	9	179	Bobby Humbles	Bradley University
1978	NBA	10	193	Mike Muff	Murray State University
1977	NBA	1	16	Rickey Green	University of Michigan
1977	NBA	1	18	Wesley Cox	University of Louisville
1977	NBA	2	38	Ricky Love	University of Alabama in Huntsville
1977	NBA	3	60	Marlon Redmond	University of San Francisco
1977	NBA	4	82	Roy Smith	Kentucky State University
1977	NBA	4	87	Leartha Scott	University of Wisconsin-Parkside
1977	NBA	5	104	Ray Epps	Norfolk State University
1977	NBA	6	126	Jack Phelan	Saint Francis University
1977	NBA	7	146	Jerry Thurston	Mercer University
1977	NBA	8	165	Ricky Marsh	Manhattan College
1976	NBA	1	8	Robert Parish	Centenary College of Louisiana
1976	NBA	1	17	Sonny Parker	Texas A&M University
1976	NBA	2	34	Marshall Rogers	University of Texas-Pan American
1976	NBA	4	68	Jeff Fosnes	Vanderbilt University
1976	NBA	5	86	Carl Bird	University of California
1976	NBA	6	91	Duane Barnett	Stanford University
1976	NBA	6	104	Gene Cunningham	Norfolk State University
1976	NBA	7	122	Jesse Campbell	Mercyhurst College
1976	NBA	8	140	Stan Boskovich	West Virginia University
1976	NBA	9	157	Howard Smith	University of San Francisco
1976	NBA	10	173	Ken Smith	San Diego State University
1975	NBA	1	14	Joe Bryant	La Salle University
1975	NBA	2	20	Gus Williams	University of Southern California
1975	NBA	3	40	Otis Johnson	Stetson University
1975	NBA	3	51	Robert Hawkins	Illinois State University
1975	NBA	4	69	Billy Taylor	La Salle University
1975	NBA	5	87	Larry Pounds	University of Washington
1975	NBA	6	105	Tony Styles	University of San Francisco
1975	NBA	7	123	Stan Boyer	University of Wyoming
1975	NBA	8	141	Mike Rozenski	Saint Mary's College of California
1975	NBA	9	157	Scott Trobbe	Stanford University
1975	NBA	10	171	Maurice Harper	Saint Mary's College of California
1974	NBA	1	11	Jamaal Wilkes	University of California, Los Angeles
1974	NBA	2	29	Phil Smith	University of San Francisco
1974	NBA	3	47	Frank Kendrick	Purdue University
1974	NBA	4	65	Willie Biles	University of Tulsa
1974	NBA	5	83	Steve Erickson	Oregon State University
1974	NBA	6	101	John Errecart	University of the Pacific
1974	NBA	7	119	Brady Allen	University of California
1974	NBA	8	137	Clarence Allen	University of California, Santa Barbara
1974	NBA	9	155	Carl Meier	University of California
1974	NBA	10	172	Marvin Buckley	University of Nevada, Reno
1973	NBA	1	11	Kevin Joyce	University of South Carolina
1973	NBA	2	29	Derrek Dickey	University of Cincinnati
1973	NBA	3	46	Jim Retseck	Auburn University
1973	NBA	4	63	Ron King	Florida State University
1973	NBA	5	80	Nate Stephens	California State University, Long Beach
1973	NBA	6	97	Bob Lauriski	Utah State University
1973	NBA	7	114	Steve Smith	Loyola Marymount University
1973	NBA	8	131	Jeff Dawson	University of Illinois at Urbana–Champaign
1973	NBA	9	146	Everett Fopma	Idaho State University
1973	NBA	10	160	Fred Lavoroni	Santa Clara University
1972	NBA	3	43	Bill Chamberlain	University of North Carolina
1972	NBA	4	60	John Tschogl	University of California, Santa Barbara
1972	NBA	5	76	Charles Dudley	University of Washington
1972	NBA	6	93	Henry Bacon	University of Louisville
1972	NBA	7	110	William Franklin	Purdue University
1972	NBA	8	126	John Burks	University of San Francisco
1972	NBA	9	141	Bill Duey	University of California
1971	NBA	1	8	Darnell Hillman	San Jose State University
1971	NBA	4	59	Greg Gary	St. Bonaventure University
1971	NBA	5	76	Odis Allison	University of Nevada, Las Vegas
1971	NBA	6	93	Charles Johnson	University of California
1971	NBA	7	110	Ken May	University of Dayton
1971	NBA	8	127	Jim Haderlein	Loyola Marymount University
1971	NBA	9	143	Clarence Smith	Villanova University
1971	NBA	10	159	Bill Drosdiak	University of Oregon
1970	NBA	3	36	Earle Higgins	Eastern Michigan University
1970	NBA	4	53	Ralph Ogden	Santa Clara University
1970	NBA	5	70	Levi Fontaine	University of Maryland Eastern Shore
1970	NBA	6	87	Vic Bartolome	Oregon State University
1970	NBA	7	104	Joe Bergman	Creighton University
1970	NBA	8	121	Jeff Sewell	Marquette University
1970	NBA	9	138	Lou Small	University of Nevada, Reno
1970	NBA	10	155	Coby Dietrick	San Jose State University
1969	NBA	1	7	Bob Portman	Creighton University
1969	NBA	2	22	Ed Siudet	College of the Holy Cross
1969	NBA	3	36	Tom Hagan	Vanderbilt University
1969	NBA	4	50	Lee Lafayette	Michigan State University
1969	NBA	5	64	Willie Wise	Drake University
1969	NBA	6	78	Dan Obravak	University of Dayton
1969	NBA	7	92	Pat Foley	University of the Pacific
1969	NBA	8	106	Steve Rippe	University of California, Santa Barbara
1969	NBA	9	120	Greg Reed	California State University, Sacramento
1969	NBA	10	134	Dick Chapman	San Francisco State University
1969	NBA	11	148	Rich Holmberg	Saint Mary's College of California
1969	NBA	12	161	Joe Callahan	San Francisco State University
1968	NBA	1	9	Ron Williams	West Virginia University
1968	NBA	3	29	Donald Sidle	University of Oklahoma
1968	NBA	4	43	Edgar Lacy	University of California, Los Angeles
1968	NBA	5	57	Jim Eakins	Brigham Young University
1968	NBA	6	71	Bob Allen	Marshall University
1968	NBA	7	85	Dave Reasor	West Virginia University
1968	NBA	8	99	Walt Platkowski	Bowling Green State University
1968	NBA	9	113	Art Wilmore	University of San Francisco
1968	NBA	10	127	Bob Heaney	Santa Clara University
1968	NBA	11	140	Jerry Chandler	University of Nevada, Las Vegas
1968	NBA	12	153	Bob Wolfe	University of California
1967	NBA	1	10	Dave Lattin	University of Texas at El Paso
1967	NBA	3	27	Bill Turner	University of Akron
1967	NBA	4	39	Bobby Lewis	University of North Carolina
1967	NBA	5	51	Bob Lynn	University of California, Los Angeles
1967	NBA	6	63	Dale Schlueter	Colorado State University
1967	NBA	7	75	Sonny Bustion	Colorado State University
1967	NBA	8	87	Bob Krulish	University of the Pacific
1967	NBA	9	98	Richard Dean	Syracuse University
1967	NBA	10	109	Joe Galbo	San Francisco State University
1967	NBA	11	119	Bill Morgan	University of New Mexico
1967	NBA	12	130	David Fox	University of the Pacific
1966	NBA	1	3	Clyde Lee	Vanderbilt University
1966	NBA	2	13	Joe Ellis	University of San Francisco
1966	NBA	3	23	Stephen Chubin	University of Rhode Island
1966	NBA	4	33	Stephen Vacendak	Duke University
1966	NBA	5	43	Tom Kerwin	Centenary College of Louisiana
1966	NBA	6	53	Jim Pitts	Northwestern University
1966	NBA	7	62	Lon Hughey	California State University, Fresno
1966	NBA	8	71	Ken Washington	University of California, Los Angeles
1965	NBA	1	1	Fred Hetzel	Davidson College
1965	NBA	1	2	Rick Barry	University of Miami
1965	NBA	2	9	Will Frazier	Grambling State University
1965	NBA	3	18	Keith Erickson	University of California, Los Angeles
1965	NBA	4	27	Warren Rustand	University of Arizona
1965	NBA	5	36	Eddie Jackson	Oklahoma City University
1965	NBA	6	45	Jim Jarvis	Oregon State University
1965	NBA	7	54	Dan Wolters	University of California
1965	NBA	8	62	Willie Cotton	Central State University
1964	NBA	1	6	Barry Kramer	New York University
1964	NBA	2	14	Bud Koper	Oklahoma City University
1964	NBA	3	23	McCoy McLemore	Drake University
1964	NBA	4	32	Gene Elmore	Southern Methodist University
1964	NBA	5	41	Roger Suttner	Kansas State University
1964	NBA	6	50	Ray Carey	University of Missouri
1964	NBA	7	59	David Lee	University of San Francisco
1964	NBA	8	68	Bob Garibaldi	Santa Clara University
1964	NBA	9	75	Camden Wail	University of California
1964	NBA	10	82	Jeff Cartwright	Chapman University
1963	NBA	1	3	Nate Thurmond	Bowling Green State University
1963	NBA	2	11	Gary Hill	Oklahoma City University
1963	NBA	3	20	Steve Gray	Saint Mary's College of California
1963	NBA	4	29	Dave Downey	University of Illinois at Urbana–Champaign
1963	NBA	5	38	Don Turner	Southwestern College
1963	NBA	6	47	Gene Shields	Santa Clara University
1963	NBA	7	56	Don Clemetson	Stanford University
1963	NBA	8	65	Harry Dinnell	Pepperdine University
1963	NBA	9	70	Chuck White	University of Idaho
1962	NBA	1	5	Wayne Hightower	University of Kansas
1962	NBA	2	14	Hubie White	Villanova University
1962	NBA	3	23	Dave Fedor	Florida State University
1962	NBA	4	32	Garry Roggenburk	University of Dayton
1962	NBA	5	41	Jack Jackson	Virginia Union University
1962	NBA	6	50	Jim Hudock	University of North Carolina
1962	NBA	7	59	Howie Montgomery	University of Texas-Pan American
1962	NBA	8	67	Bill Kirvin	Xavier University
1962	NBA	9	76	Tom Kiefer	Saint Louis University
1962	NBA	10	84	Ken McComb	University of North Carolina
1962	NBA	11	89	Donnie Walsh	University of North Carolina
1962	NBA	12	92	Charles Warren	University of Oregon
1961	NBA	1	7	Tom Meschery	Saint Mary's College of California
1961	NBA	2	15	Ted Luckenbill	University of Houston
1961	NBA	3	29	Jack Egan	Saint Joseph's University
1961	NBA	4	38	John Tidwell	University of Michigan
1961	NBA	5	47	Bruce Spraggins	Virginia Union University
1961	NBA	6	56	Dick Goldberg	University of Southern Mississippi
1961	NBA	7	65	Charles McNeil	University of Maryland
1961	NBA	8	74	Larry Swift	Truman State University
1961	NBA	10	89	Leo Hill	University of California, Los Angeles
1961	NBA	11	97	Corky Whitrow	Georgetown College
1960	NBA	1	7	Al Bunge	University of Maryland
1960	NBA	2	15	Pickles Kennedy	Temple University
1960	NBA	3	23	Bob Mealy	Manhattan College
1960	NBA	4	31	Charley Sharp	Texas State University
1960	NBA	5	39	Al Attles	North Carolina Agricultural and Technical State University
1960	NBA	6	47	Jim Brangan	Princeton University
1960	NBA	7	55	Bob Clarke	Saint Joseph's University
1960	NBA	8	62	George Raveling	Villanova University
1960	NBA	9	69	Joe Gallo	Saint Joseph's University
1959	NBA	Territorial pick		Wilt Chamberlain	University of Kansas
1959	NBA	2	9	Joe Ruklick	Northwestern University
1959	NBA	3	17	Jim Hickaday	University of Memphis
1959	NBA	4	25	Ron Stevenson	Texas Christian University
1959	NBA	5	33	Bill Telasky	George Washington University
1959	NBA	6	41	Joe Spratt	Saint Joseph's University
1959	NBA	7	49	Joe Ryan	Villanova University
1959	NBA	8	56	Dave Gunther	University of Iowa
1959	NBA	9	62	Carl Belz	Princeton University
1959	NBA	10	68	Tony Sellari	Lenoir-Rhyne College
1959	NBA	11	74	Phil Warren	Northwestern University
1958	NBA	T		Guy Rodgers	Temple University
1958	NBA	2	12	Lloyd Sharrar	West Virginia University
1958	NBA	3	20	Frank Howard	Ohio State University
1958	NBA	4	28	Temple Tucker	Rice University
1958	NBA	5	36	Don Ohl	University of Illinois at Urbana–Champaign
1958	NBA	6	44	Bucky Allen	Duke University
1958	NBA	7	52	Jay Norman	Temple University
1958	NBA	8	60	Tom Brennan	Villanova University
1958	NBA	9	67	Nick Davis	University of Maryland
1958	NBA	10	72	Larry Hedden	Michigan State University
1957	NBA	1	6	Lennie Rosenbluth	University of North Carolina
1957	NBA	2	14	Jack Sullivan	Mount St. Mary's University
1957	NBA	3	22	Angelo Lombardo	Manhattan College
1957	NBA	4	30	Ray Radziszewski	Saint Joseph's University
1957	NBA	5	38	Jim Radcliffe	Lafayette College
1957	NBA	6	46	Alonzo Lewis	La Salle University
1957	NBA	7	53	Max Jameson	Kentucky State University
1957	NBA	8	60	Woody Sauldsberry	Texas Southern University
1957	NBA	9	67	Steve Hamilton	Morehead State University
1957	NBA	10	73	Jerry Calvert	University of Kentucky
1957	NBA			Jerry Gibson	
1956	NBA	1	7	Hal Lear	Temple University
1956	NBA			Max Anderson	University of Oregon
1956	NBA			Joe Belmont	Duke University
1956	NBA			Ronald Clark	Springfield College
1956	NBA			John Fannon	University of Notre Dame
1956	NBA			Bevo Francis	University of Rio Grande
1956	NBA			Phil Rollins	University of Louisville
1956	NBA			Phil Wheeler	University of Cincinnati
1956	NBA			Mickey Winograd	Duquesne University
1955	NBA	T		Tom Gola	La Salle University
1955	NBA	2	9	Walter Devlin	George Washington University
1955	NBA	3	17	Bob Schafer	Villanova University
1955	NBA	4	25	Ed Wiener	University of Tennessee
1955	NBA	5	33	Jack Devine	Villanova University
1955	NBA	6		George Swyers	West Virginia University Institute of Technology
1955	NBA	7		Harry Silcox	Temple University
1955	NBA	8		Al Didriksen	Temple University
1955	NBA	9		Lester Lane	University of Oklahoma
1955	NBA	10		Jerry Koch	Saint Louis University
1954	NBA	1	3	Gene Shue	University of Maryland
1954	NBA	2	12	Larry Costello	Niagara University
1954	NBA	3	21	Ben Peters	Benedictine College
1954	NBA	4	30	Chuck Noble	University of Louisville
1954	NBA	5	39	Rudy D'Emilio	Duke University
1954	NBA	6	48	Len Winogard	Brandeis University
1954	NBA	7	57	Bob Brady	San Diego State University
1954	NBA	8	66	Bob Hodges	East Carolina University
1954	NBA	9	75	Vince Leta	Lycoming College
1954	NBA	10	83	Bill Sullivan	University of Notre Dame
1954	NBA	11	92	Francis O'Hara	La Salle University
1954	NBA	12	98	John Glinski	State University of New York at Cortland
1954	NBA	13	100	Joe Holup	George Washington University
1953	NBA	T		Ernie Beck	University of Pennsylvania
1953	NBA	2		Larry Hennessy	Villanova University
1953	NBA	3		Norm Grekin	La Salle University
1953	NBA	4		Fred Ihle	La Salle University
1953	NBA	5		Eddie Solomon	West Virginia University Institute of Technology
1953	NBA	6		Don Eby	University of Southern California
1953	NBA	7		Bob Marske	University of South Dakota
1953	NBA	8		Bill Dodd	Colgate University
1953	NBA	9		Bob Sassone	St. Bonaventure University
1953	NBA	10		Toar Hester	Centenary College of Louisiana
1953	NBA	11		John Doogan	Saint Joseph's University
1953	NBA	12		Charles Duffley	Saint Anselm College
1953	NBA			Jack George	La Salle University
1952	NBA	T		Bill Mlkvy	Temple University
1952	NBA	2		Walt Davis	Texas A&M University
1952	NBA			Tom Brennan	Villanova University
1952	NBA			Bob Brown	University of Louisville
1952	NBA			Burr Carlson	University of Connecticut
1952	NBA			Newt Jones	La Salle University
1952	NBA			Nick Kladis	Loyola University of Chicago
1952	NBA			Moe Radovich	University of Wyoming
1952	NBA			Don Scanlon	University of Pennsylvania
1952	NBA			Glen Smith	University of Utah
1952	NBA			Ben Stewart	Villanova University
1951	NBA	1	9	Don Sunderlage	University of Illinois at Urbana–Champaign
1951	NBA	2	18	Mel Payton	Tulane University
1951	NBA	3	28	Bob Schloss	University of Georgia
1951	NBA	4	38	Jud Milhon	Ohio Wesleyan University
1951	NBA	5	48	Mike Kearns	Princeton University
1951	NBA	6	58	Bob Swails	University of Indianapolis
1951	NBA	7	68	George Dempsey	King's College
1951	NBA	8	77	James Phelan	La Salle University
1951	NBA	9	81	Hugh Faulkner	Pepperdine University
1951	NBA	10	84	Paul Gerwin	Cornell University
1950	NBA	T		Paul Arizin	Villanova University
1950	NBA	2		Ed Dahler	Duquesne University
1950	NBA	3		Buddy Cate	Western Kentucky University
1950	NBA	4		Paul Sensky	Saint Joseph's University
1950	NBA	5		Ike Borsavage	Temple University
1950	NBA	6		Dick Dallmer	University of Cincinnati
1950	NBA	7		Charles Northup	Siena College
1950	NBA	8		Brooks Ricca	Villanova University
1950	NBA	9		Joe Kaufman	New York University
1950	NBA	10		Bernie Adams	Princeton University
1950	NBA	11		Leo Wolfe	Villanova University
1950	NBA	12		Ed Montgomery	University of Tennessee
1949	BAA	1	5	Vern Gardner	University of Utah
1949	BAA	2		Jim Nolan	Georgia Institute of Technology
1949	BAA	3		Nelson Bobb	Temple University
1948	BAA	1	11	Don Ray	Western Kentucky University
1948	BAA			Bill Brown	University of Maryland
1948	BAA			Hugh Compton	University of Louisville
1948	BAA			Joe Nelson	Brigham Young University
1948	BAA			Clint Pace	Pepperdine University
1948	BAA			Roy Pugh	Southern Methodist University
1948	BAA			Tom Short	Kansas Wesleyan
1948	BAA			Joe Wahl	University of Akron
1948	BAA			Andy Wolfe	University of California
1947	BAA	1	6	Chink Crossin	University of Pennsylvania
1947	BAA			Norman Butz	Saint Joseph's University
1947	BAA			Jim Kaeding	York College of Pennsylvania
1947	BAA			Ed Koffenberger	Duke University
1947	BAA			Jim Pollard	Stanford University

== Notes ==
6bc
