= Marco Belinelli =

Italian basketball player (born 1986)

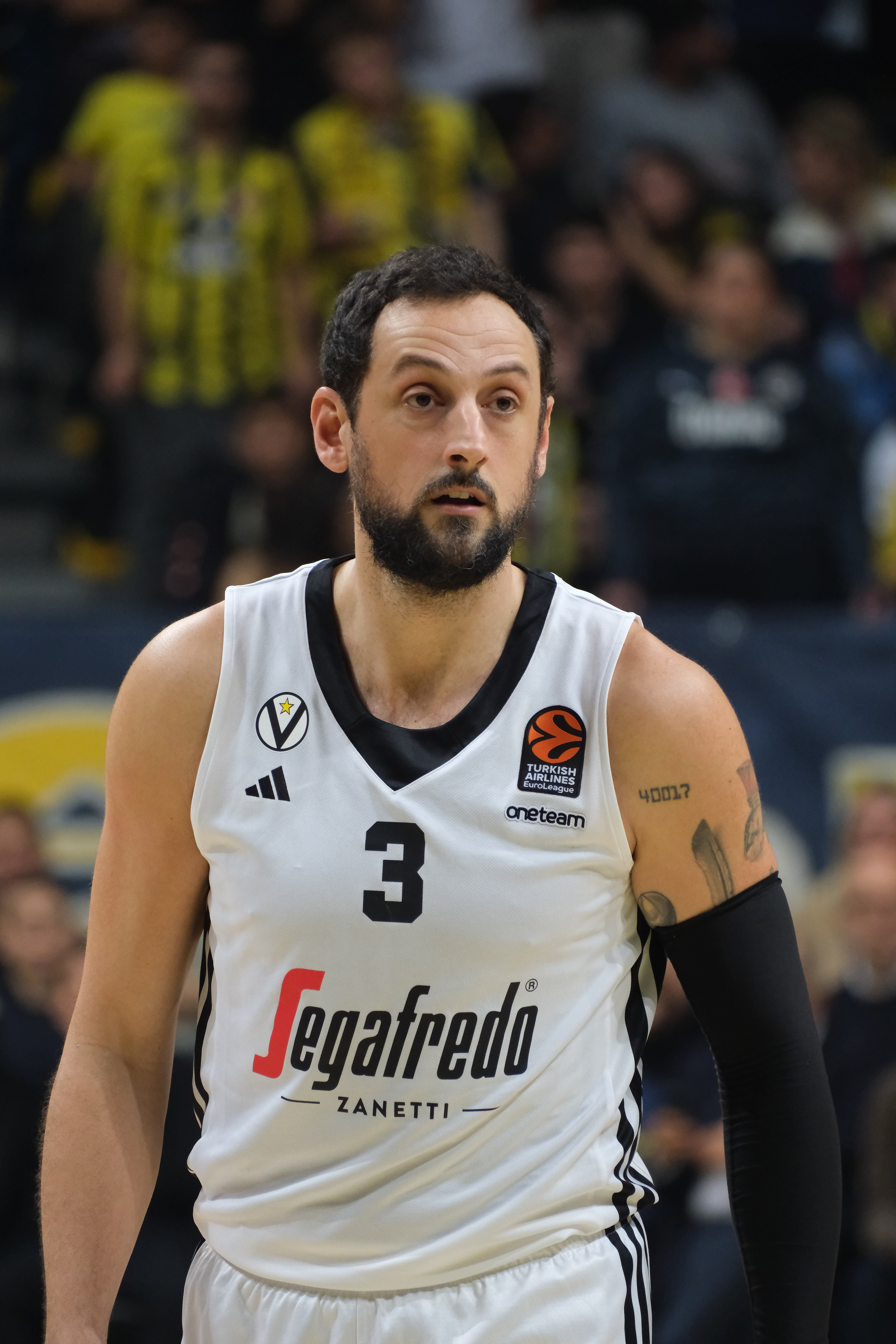
- Belinelli with Virtus Bologna in 2025

Personal information
- Born: 25 March 1986 (age 40) San Giovanni in Persiceto, Italy
- Listed height: 1.96 m (6 ft 5 in)
- Listed weight: 100 kg (220 lb)

Career information
- NBA draft: 2007: 1st round, 18th overall pick
- Drafted by: Golden State Warriors
- Playing career: 2002–2025
- Position: Shooting guard / small forward
- Number: 18, 0, 8, 3, 21

Career history
- 2002–2003: Virtus Bologna
- 2003–2007: Fortitudo Bologna
- 2007–2009: Golden State Warriors
- 2009–2010: Toronto Raptors
- 2010–2012: New Orleans Hornets
- 2012–2013: Chicago Bulls
- 2013–2015: San Antonio Spurs
- 2015–2016: Sacramento Kings
- 2016–2017: Charlotte Hornets
- 2017–2018: Atlanta Hawks
- 2018: Philadelphia 76ers
- 2018–2020: San Antonio Spurs
- 2020–2025: Virtus Bologna

Career highlights
- NBA champion (2014); NBA Three-Point Contest champion (2014); EuroCup champion (2022); 3× Lega Serie A champion (2005, 2021, 2025); Italian Cup winner (2002); 4× Italian Supercup winner (2005, 2021–2023); Italian Supercup MVP (2005); Lega Serie A MVP (2024); 2× All-Lega Serie A Team (2023, 2024); 2× Lega Serie A Sixth Man of the Year (2022, 2023); Lega Serie A Domestic Player of the Year (2023)

Career statistics
- Points: 8,370 (9.7 ppg)
- Rebounds: 1,769 (2.1 rpg)
- Assists: 1,429 (1.7 apg)
- Stats at NBA.com
- Stats at Basketball Reference

Marco Stefano Belinelli (Italian pronunciation: [ˈmarko beliˈnɛlli]; born 25 March 1986) is an Italian former professional basketball player. He was selected 18th overall in the 2007 NBA draft by the Golden State Warriors. In 2014, he won the NBA championship with the San Antonio Spurs, becoming the first Italian player to do so. He won the Three-Point Contest during the 2014 NBA All-Star Weekend. He played in the 2007, 2011, 2013, 2015, and 2017 editions of the FIBA EuroBasket and the 2006 and 2019 editions of the FIBA World Championship with the Italian national basketball team.

== Professional career ==
=== Virtus and Fortitudo Bologna (2002–2007) ===
Belinelli played in the Italian Serie A and the EuroLeague for Virtus Bologna and Fortitudo Bologna. In 2004, he lost the EuroLeague Finals against Maccabi Tel Aviv, and in 2005, he won the Serie A title with Fortitudo.

=== NBA (2007–2020) ===
==== Golden State Warriors (2007–2009) ====
After being selected #18 in the first round of the 2007 NBA draft by the Golden State Warriors, Belinelli scored 37 points in his first NBA Summer League game against the New Orleans Hornets, going 14-on-20 from the field, including 5-on-7 from behind the arc, adding 5 boards, 2 assists and 1 steal to help the Warriors earn a 110–102 win. His performance is tied for second for the highest scoring game ever in Vegas summer league history, behind Keith Bogans' 38 scored as a member of the Orlando Magic in 2004. Belinelli finished his Summer League scoring an average of 22.8 points per game in 4 games with the Warriors, before returning to Italy to be part of the Italian national team for EuroBasket 2007. On 19 December 2008, he scored 27 points, in a game the Warriors lost to Atlanta Hawks.

==== Toronto Raptors (2009–2010) ====
On 30 July 2009, he was traded to the Toronto Raptors for Devean George, joining Italian national squad teammate Andrea Bargnani. He played his first NBA game as a starter for Toronto on 2 February 2010 against the Indiana Pacers.

==== New Orleans Hornets (2010–2012) ====
On 11 August 2010, he was traded to the New Orleans Hornets for Julian Wright. After the 2010–11 season, he became a restricted free agent. On 13 December 2011, he signed the $3.4 million qualifying offer to stay with the Hornets for one more year.

==== Chicago Bulls (2012–2013) ====
On 24 July 2012, Belinelli signed a one-year, $1.96 million contract with the Chicago Bulls. With the Bulls, Belinelli developed a reputation as a clutch player, hitting shots that include a game winning shot against the Celtics in overtime while falling down, a go-ahead layup against the Detroit Pistons after Joakim Noah saved the ball from going out of bounds, a game-winning lay-up with 20 seconds remaining against the Brooklyn Nets, and a 3 pointer to give the Bulls a 1-point lead with 5 seconds remaining in a game vs. the Utah Jazz. Belinelli and Joakim Noah each scored 24 points in a Game 7 victory over the Brooklyn Nets in the first round of the 2013 NBA Playoffs.

==== San Antonio Spurs (2013–2015) ====
On 11 July 2013, Belinelli signed a two-year, $5.6 million contract with the San Antonio Spurs.

On 2 January 2014, Belinelli scored a career-high 32 points in a 105–101 loss to the New York Knicks.

Belinelli also won the Three-Point Contest at the 2014 NBA All-Star Weekend in New Orleans, beating Bradley Beal of the Washington Wizards at the second attempt in the final after Beal equaled Belinelli's score in the initial final round. In the tiebreaker, Belinelli made six straight shots at a single point, sweeping his fourth rack.

In his first season with the Spurs, Belinelli posted career-highs on field goal percentage, three-point percentage, and free-throw percentage.

In Game 3 of the 2014 NBA Finals against the two-time defending champion Miami Heat, Belinelli hit a crucial 3 pointer in the third quarter that increased San Antonio's lead back to double digits. The Heat had rallied, cutting the Spurs' half-time lead of 21 points to just seven, before Belinelli's three-pointer. Upon winning the 2014 Finals, he became the first Italian player to win an NBA championship.

==== Kings, Hornets, Hawks and 76ers (2015–2018) ====
On 13 July 2015, Belinelli signed a three-year, $19 million contract with the Sacramento Kings. On 30 December 2015, he scored a season-high 28 points in a loss to the Philadelphia 76ers.

On 7 July 2016, Belinelli was traded to the Charlotte Hornets in exchange for the draft rights to Malachi Richardson. On 20 June 2017, Belinelli was traded, along with Miles Plumlee and the 41st pick which became Tyler Dorsey in the 2017 NBA draft, to the Atlanta Hawks in exchange for Dwight Howard and the 31st overall pick (Frank Jackson) in the 2017 NBA draft. On 9 February 2018, he was waived by the Hawks.

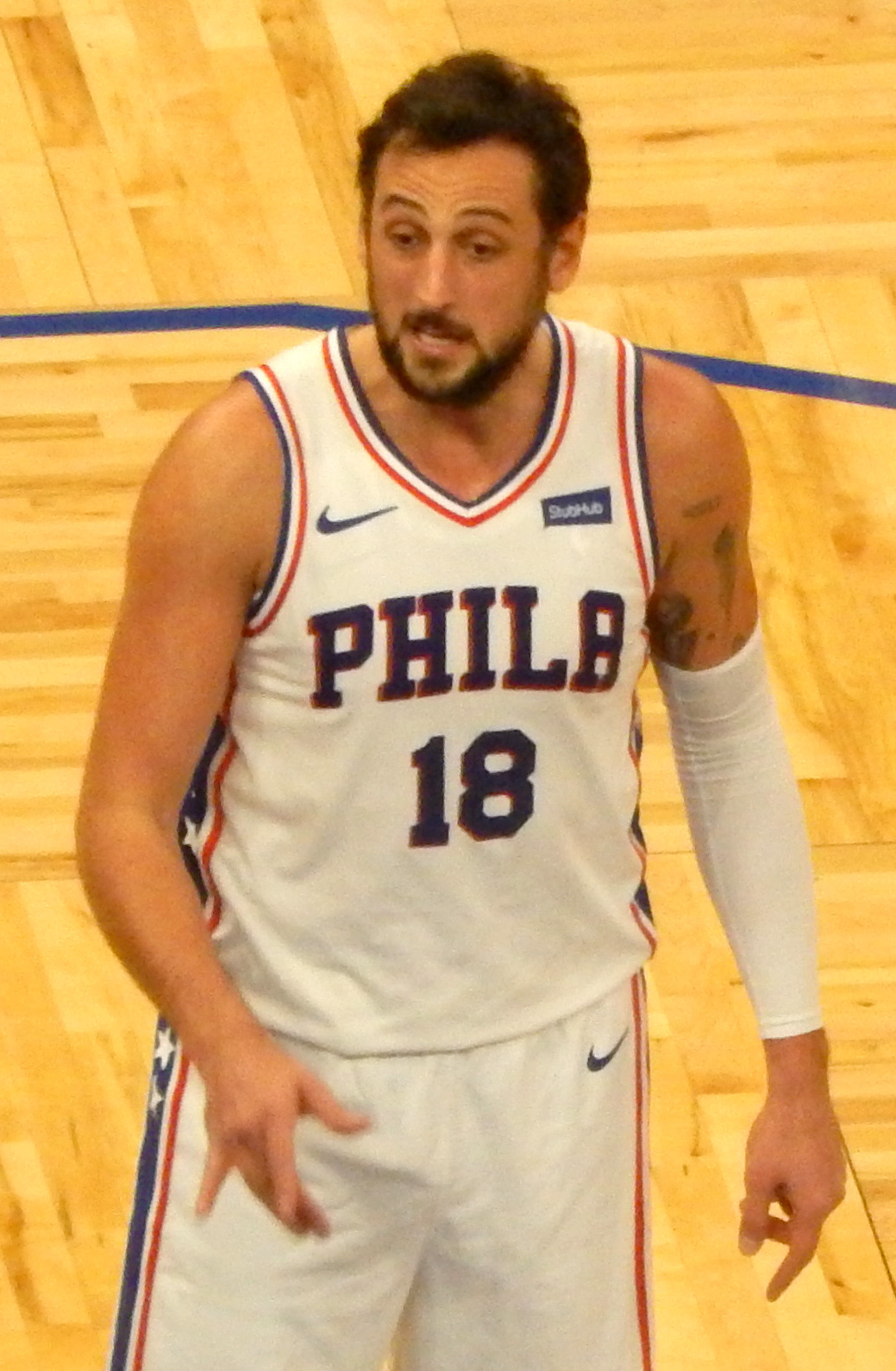
Belinelli playing for the 76ers in 2018

On 12 February 2018, Belinelli signed with the Philadelphia 76ers for the remainder of the season. In Game 3 of the Eastern Conference Semi-Finals against the Boston Celtics, Marco made a two-point corner shot to send the game to overtime, 89–89. However, the 76ers would lose to the Celtics, 101–98.

==== Second stint with the Spurs (2018–2020) ====
On 20 July 2018, Belinelli signed a two-year, $12 million contract with the San Antonio Spurs, returning to the franchise for a second stint.

=== Virtus Bologna (2020–2025) ===
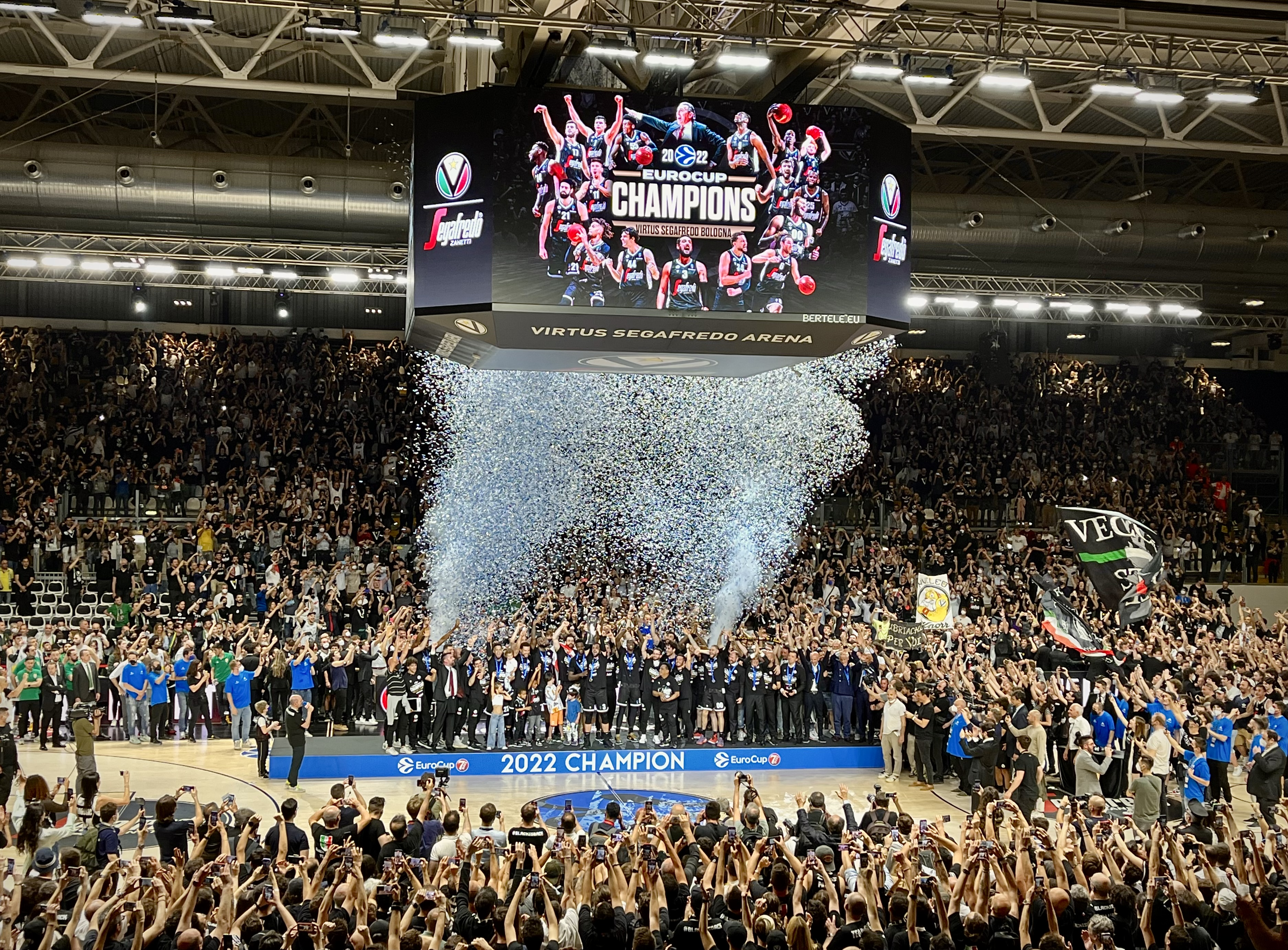
Belinelli and teammates celebrating the EuroCup victory in 2022

On 26 November 2020, Belinelli left the NBA and returned to Italy signing a three-year deal, until June 2023 with Virtus Bologna. In April 2021, despite a winning record of 19–2, Virtus was defeated in the EuroCup's semifinals by UNICS Kazan. However, the season ended with a great success. In fact, after having knocked out 3–0 both Basket Treviso in the quarterfinals and New Basket Brindisi in the semifinals, on 11 June Virtus defeated 4–0 its historic rival Olimpia Milano in the national finals, winning its 16th national title and the first one after twenty years.

On 21 September 2021, the team won its second Supercup, defeating Olimpia Milano 90–84. Moreover, after having ousted Lietkabelis, Ulm and Valencia in the first three rounds of the playoffs, on 11 May 2022, Virtus defeated Frutti Extra Bursaspor by 80–67 at the Segafredo Arena, winning its first EuroCup and qualifying for the EuroLeague after 14 years. However, despite having ended the regular season at the first place and having ousted 3–0 both Pesaro and Tortona in the first two rounds of playoffs, Virtus was defeated 4–2 in the national finals by Olimpia Milan.

On 29 September 2022, after having ousted Milano in the semifinals, Virtus won its third Supercup, defeating 72–69 Banco di Sardegna Sassari and achieving a back-to-back, following the 2021 trophy. However, despite good premises Virtus ended the EuroLeague season at the 14th place, thus it did not qualify for the playoffs. Moreover, the team was defeated in the Italian Basketball Cup final by Brescia. In June, after having ousted 3–0 both Brindisi and Tortona, Virtus was defeated 4–3 by Olimpia Milan in the national finals, following a series which was widely regarded among the best in the latest years of Italian basketball.

On 7 July 2023, Belinelli renewed his contract with Virtus through 2025. On 24 September, after having ousted Olimpia Milano in the semifinals, Virtus won its fourth Supercup, and the third in a row, defeating 97–60 Germani Brescia. Despite an impressive first half of the season, Virtus ended the EuroLeague regular season at the 10th place, qualifying only for the play-in, where after having defeated 67–64 Anadolu Efes, it lost against Baskonia 89–77, not qualifying for the playoffs. Moreover, the Black V placed first during the Italian regular season but, after having knocked out Tortona by 3–2 and Reyer Venezia by 3–1, it lost the third consecutive final against Milan by 3–1.

In the following season Virtus ended the EuroLeague at the 17th place, after a disappointing regular season. After arriving first in the national championship season, Virtus eliminated Venezia 3–2 and their arch-rival Milan 3–1, reaching their fifth finals in a row. They then defeated Brescia 3–0, claiming the Italian championship title for the 17th time. For Belinelli, this was the third scudetto of his career.

On 18 August 2025, Belinelli announced his retirement from professional basketball, concluding his 20-year professional career, citing that he gave the game of basketball "...my heart. Every piece of me. Every single day. Basketball gave me everything… and I gave it everything I had.”

== National team career ==
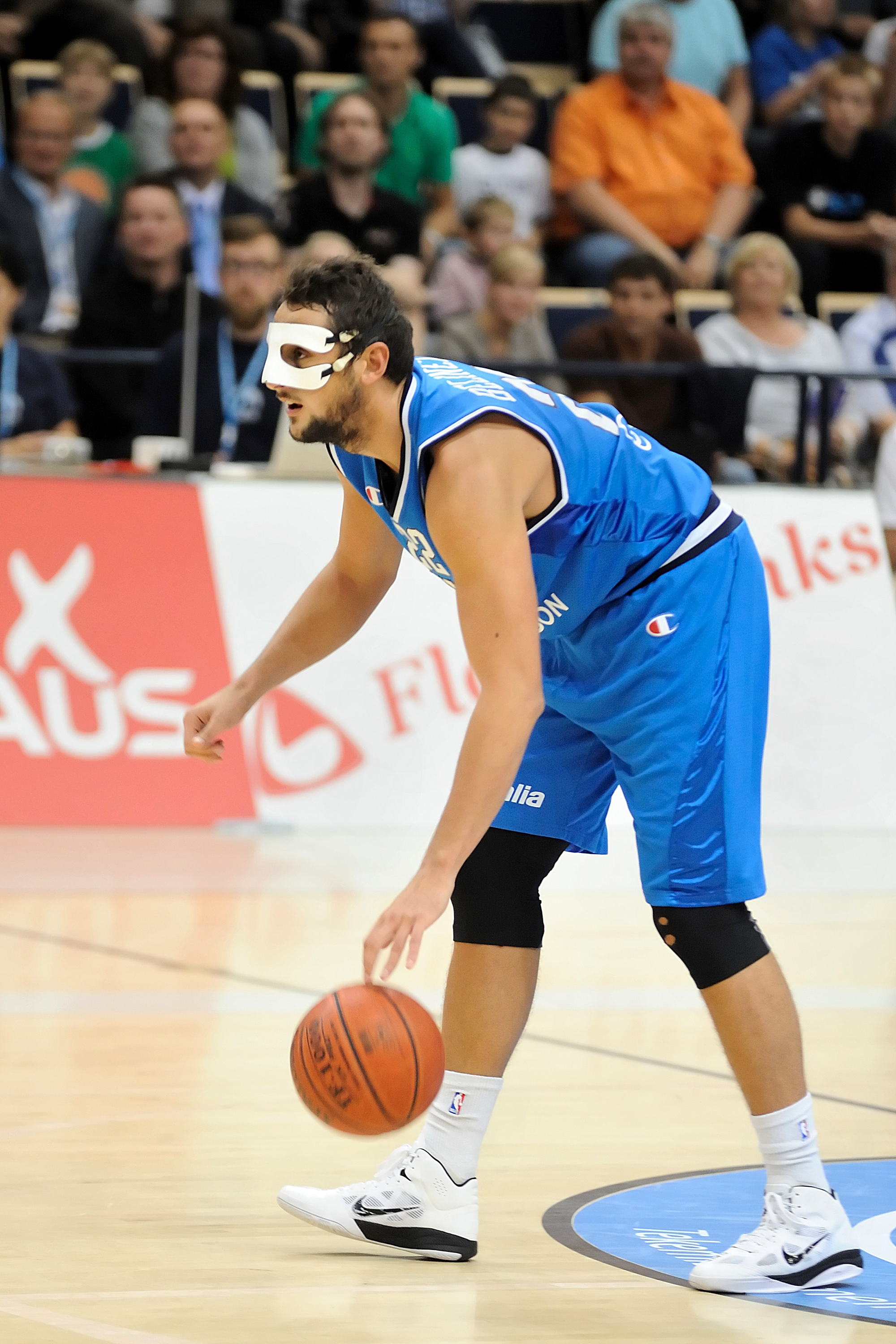
Marco Belinelli with Italy's national team

Belinelli made his debut with the Italian national team in the 2006 FIBA World Championship. In that tournament, he scored 25 points against the United States national team, including a dunk on Carmelo Anthony. In that tournament, he averaged 13.5 points per game, being the best scorer of his team.

He averaged 15.5 points per game at the 2007 EuroBasket, 12.0 points per game at the 2011 EuroBasket, 13.6 points per game at the 2013 EuroBasket, 16.3 points per game at the 2015 EuroBasket and 17.9 points per game at the 2017 EuroBasket.

== Career statistics ==
=== NBA ===
Legend
| GP | Games played | GS | Games started | MPG | Minutes per game |
| FG% | Field goal percentage | 3P% | 3-point field goal percentage | FT% | Free throw percentage |
| RPG | Rebounds per game | APG | Assists per game | SPG | Steals per game |
| BPG | Blocks per game | PPG | Points per game | **Bold** | Career high |
| † | Won an NBA championship | * | Led the league |

==== Regular season ====
| Year | Team | GP | GS | MPG | FG% | 3P% | FT% | RPG | APG | SPG | BPG | PPG |
|---|---|---|---|---|---|---|---|---|---|---|---|---|
| 2007–08 | Golden State | 33 | 0 | 7.3 | .387 | .390 | .778 | .4 | .5 | .2 | .0 | 2.9 |
| 2008–09 | Golden State | 42 | 23 | 21.0 | .442 | .397 | .769 | 1.7 | 2.1 | **.9** | .0 | 8.9 |
| 2009–10 | Toronto | 66 | 1 | 17.0 | .406 | .380 | .835 | 1.4 | 1.3 | .6 | .1 | 7.1 |
| 2010–11 | New Orleans | **80** | **69** | 24.5 | .437 | .414 | .784 | 1.9 | 1.2 | .5 | .1 | 10.5 |
| 2011–12 | New Orleans | 66* | 55 | **29.8** | .417 | .377 | .783 | 2.6 | 1.5 | .7 | .1 | 11.8 |
| 2012–13 | Chicago | 73 | 27 | 25.8 | .395 | .357 | .839 | 1.9 | 2.0 | .6 | .1 | 9.6 |
| 2013–14† | San Antonio | **80** | 25 | 25.2 | .485 | **.430** | .847 | **2.8** | **2.2** | .6 | .1 | 11.4 |
| 2014–15 | San Antonio | 62 | 9 | 22.4 | .423 | .374 | .848 | 2.5 | 1.5 | .5 | .0 | 9.2 |
| 2015–16 | Sacramento | 68 | 7 | 24.6 | .386 | .306 | .833 | 1.7 | 1.9 | .5 | .0 | 10.2 |
| 2016–17 | Charlotte | 74 | 0 | 24.0 | .429 | .362 | .893 | 2.4 | 2.0 | .6 | .1 | 10.5 |
| 2017–18 | Atlanta | 52 | 1 | 23.3 | .411 | .372 | **.927** | 1.9 | 2.0 | **.9** | .1 | 11.4 |
| 2017–18 | Philadelphia | 28 | 1 | 26.3 | **.495** | .385 | .870 | 1.8 | 1.6 | .7 | **.3** | **13.6** |
| 2018–19 | San Antonio | 79 | 1 | 23.0 | .413 | .372 | .903 | 2.5 | 1.7 | .4 | .1 | 10.5 |
| 2019–20 | San Antonio | 57 | 0 | 15.5 | .392 | .376 | .828 | 1.7 | 1.2 | .2 | .0 | 6.3 |
| Career | | 860 | 219 | 22.7 | .424 | .376 | .846 | 2.1 | 1.7 | .6 | .1 | 9.7 |

==== Playoffs ====
| Year | Team | GP | GS | MPG | FG% | 3P% | FT% | RPG | APG | SPG | BPG | PPG |
|---|---|---|---|---|---|---|---|---|---|---|---|---|
| 2011 | New Orleans | 6 | 6 | **28.8** | .365 | .308 | **1.000** | .8 | .7 | **.8** | .0 | 9.7 |
| 2013 | Chicago | 12 | **7** | 27.1 | .411 | .340 | .879 | **2.9** | **2.6** | .4 | .0 | 11.1 |
| 2014† | San Antonio | **23** | 0 | 15.5 | .444 | .421 | .955 | 2.3 | .8 | .1 | .0 | 5.4 |
| 2015 | San Antonio | 7 | 0 | 16.6 | **.513** | **.467** | .846 | 1.9 | 1.4 | .3 | .0 | 9.3 |
| 2018 | Philadelphia | 10 | 0 | 27.3 | .406 | .348 | .871 | 2.1 | 2.0 | .7 | .0 | **12.9** |
| 2019 | San Antonio | 7 | 0 | 18.7 | .368 | .381 | .833 | 1.9 | 1.1 | .0 | **.3** | 5.9 |
| Career | | 65 | 13 | 21.1 | .416 | .375 | .890 | 2.1 | 1.4 | .3 | .0 | 8.5 |

=== EuroLeague ===
| Year | Team | GP | GS | MPG | FG% | 3P% | FT% | RPG | APG | SPG | BPG | PPG | PIR |
|---|---|---|---|---|---|---|---|---|---|---|---|---|---|
| 2002–03 | Virtus Bologna | 8 | 0 | 16.3 | .395 | .278 | .667 | 1.3 | 1.0 | .4 | — | 5.6 | 4.0 |
| 2003–04 | Fortitudo Bologna | 16 | 7 | 12.5 | .425 | .391 | .833 | .6 | .3 | .3 | — | 3.0 | 1.3 |
| 2004–05 | Fortitudo Bologna | 20 | 1 | 15.0 | **.500** | .367 | .688 | 1.1 | 1.1 | .6 | **.1** | 4.2 | 3.6 |
| 2005–06 | Fortitudo Bologna | 19 | 12 | **27.9** | .479 | **.439** | .711 | 1.6 | 1.0 | **1.4** | — | 13.4 | **9.4** |
| 2006–07 | Fortitudo Bologna | 13 | **13** | 27.7 | .378 | .320 | .756 | **1.9** | 1.3 | .8 | — | 12.8 | 8.7 |
| 2022–23 | Virtus Bologna | 21 | 1 | 16.9 | .422 | .407 | **.935** | 1.4 | 1.1 | .5 | — | 10.0 | 7.5 |
| 2023–24 | Virtus Bologna | **35** | **33** | 22.7 | .404 | .382 | .865 | 1.7 | **1.7** | .4 | — | **14.1** | 9.2 |
| 2024–25 | Virtus Bologna | 30 | 1 | 13.7 | .361 | .294 | .818 | .5 | .9 | .3 | **.1** | 6.2 | 2.5 |
| Career | | 162 | 68 | 19.0 | .414 | .372 | .813 | 1.2 | 1.1 | .5 | .0 | 9.2 | 6.0 |

== Works ==
- Marco Belinelli (preface), Cardinal Matteo Maria Zuppi (in Italian), Fratelli tutti. Davvero: uomini e donne in dialogo con il cardinale Matteo Maria Zuppi, Effatà, 2021, 98 p. ISBN 9788869297632, OCLC 1312622846

== See also ==
- List of European basketball players in the United States
- List of Italian NBA players
- Golden State Warriors draft history
- List of youngest EuroLeague players
