= 2013 NBA playoffs =

Postseason tournament

Tournament details
- Dates: April 20–June 20, 2013
- Season: 2012–13
- Teams: 16

Final positions
- Champions: Miami Heat (3rd title)
- Runners-up: San Antonio Spurs
- Semifinalists: Indiana Pacers; Memphis Grizzlies

Tournament statistics
- Scoring leader(s): LeBron James (Heat) (25.9 PPG)

Awards
- MVP: LeBron James (Heat)

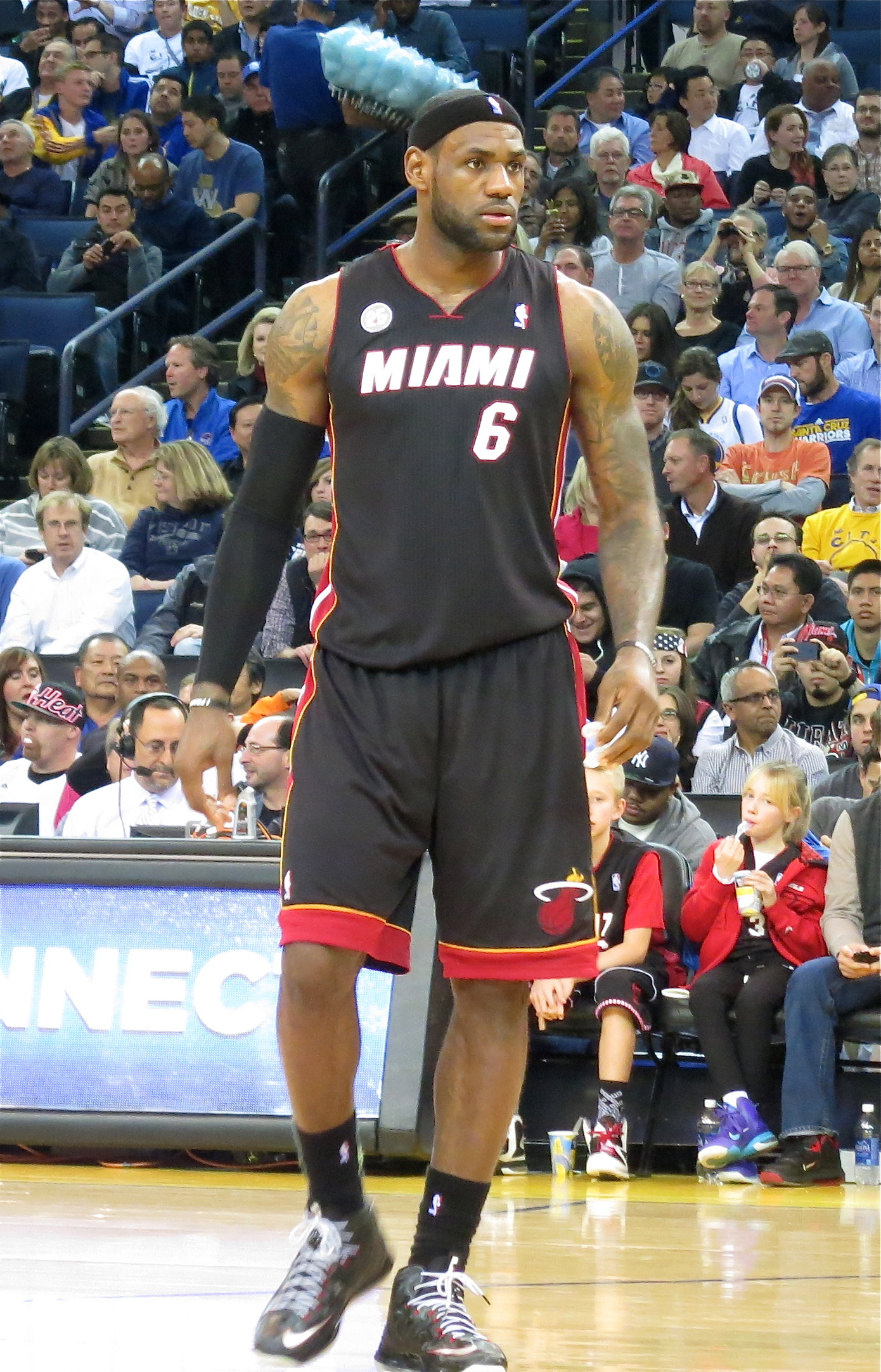
LeBron James playing against the Golden State Warriors, 16 January 2013

The 2013 NBA playoffs was the postseason tournament of the National Basketball Association's 2012–13 season. The tournament concluded with the Eastern Conference champion and defending champion Miami Heat defeating the Western Conference champion San Antonio Spurs 4 games to 3 in the NBA Finals. LeBron James was named NBA Finals MVP for the second straight year.

== Overview ==
The Miami Heat headed into the playoffs with a franchise–best 66 wins, topping the league in the regular season. Their 2012 Finals opponents, the Oklahoma City Thunder, topped the Western Conference with 60 wins, making it the first time since 2006 that the two teams who faced off in the previous year's finals topped their respective conferences in the next regular season.

This was also the final NBA Playoffs played under commissioner David Stern.

=== Western Conference ===
The San Antonio Spurs continued the longest active playoff streak at 16 straight appearances. The Dallas Mavericks missed the playoffs for the first time since 2000, ending the second-longest active streak of playoff appearances, which stretched 12 years.

The Los Angeles Clippers made franchise history by winning their first Pacific Division title and having a 56–win season, tied with the Memphis Grizzlies, whose 56 wins were also a franchise record. However, home court advantage went to the Clippers by virtue of winning their division. Meanwhile, the Los Angeles Lakers entered their eighth consecutive postseason. However, this was their first appearance since 1996 without Kobe Bryant, as he was out with injury.

The Denver Nuggets entered their tenth consecutive postseason. They also earned the West's third seed and headed into the playoffs with a franchise–record 57 wins.

The Golden State Warriors made their first playoff appearance since 2007, while the Houston Rockets made their first playoff appearance since 2009.

=== Eastern Conference ===
The Indiana Pacers won the Central Division for the first time since 2004, while the New York Knicks entered the playoffs with their best regular-season performance since 1997, finishing atop the Atlantic Division for the first time since 1994. The Knicks also opened the playoffs at home for the first time since 2001.

The Brooklyn Nets made the playoffs for the first time since 2007, when they were known as the New Jersey Nets, while the Milwaukee Bucks appeared for the first time since 2010. The Bucks were the first team since 2011 to make the playoffs despite finishing below .500 in the regular season.

The New York Knicks entered their third consecutive postseason. Their first round opponent, the Boston Celtics opened their postseason run just days after the Boston Marathon bombing, which occurred just blocks from where the Celtics play their games at TD Garden.

The Orlando Magic missed the playoffs for the first time since 2006, ending the longest active streak in the Eastern Conference. As a result, the Atlanta Hawks would own this distinction from 2013 to 2017.

=== First Round ===
Game 1 of the Nets–Bulls series marked the first time that Barclays Center hosted a playoff game. Game 7 of the same series also marked the 14th straight postseason with at least one Game 7. The 1999 NBA playoffs was the last time that a Game 7 was not played.

With their series sweep of the Milwaukee Bucks, the Miami Heat swept a playoff series for the first time since 2005. They also won every game by double digits.

Game 3 of the Knicks–Celtics series was the first Celtics home game since the Boston Marathon Bombings.

Game 4 of the Spurs–Lakers series was the final Lakers playoff game until 2020.

With their Game 6 win over the Boston Celtics, the New York Knicks won a playoff series for the first time since 2000.

=== Conference Semifinals ===
For the first time since 2000, the New York Knicks and the Indiana Pacers met in the postseason, reigniting the Knicks–Pacers rivalry.

With Oklahoma City's Game 5 loss to the Memphis Grizzlies in the Conference Semifinals, home court advantage in the Western Conference Finals went to the San Antonio Spurs, who were two games ahead of the Grizzlies. With the win, the Grizzlies made the conference finals for the first time in franchise history.

With their Game 6 win over the Golden State Warriors, the San Antonio Spurs returned to the Western Conference Finals for the second consecutive year.

With their Game 6 win over the New York Knicks, the Indiana Pacers made the Eastern Conference Finals for the first time since 2004. The Knicks did not return to the playoffs until 2021.

=== Conference Finals ===
By sweeping the Memphis Grizzlies in the Western Conference Finals, the San Antonio Spurs returned to the NBA Finals for the first time since 2007.

For the second consecutive postseason, the Eastern Conference Finals went to a Game 7. The Heat won the game, and earned their third straight berth in the NBA Finals.

=== NBA Finals ===
The 2013 NBA Finals were notable for several reasons.

- Game 2: LeBron James’ block of Tiago Splitter
- Game 5: Danny Green setting an NBA Finals record for three pointers made in a series.
- Game 6: The Miami Heat came back from a five-point deficit with 28.2 seconds in regulation to win the game in overtime. The highlights of the comeback, Ray Allen's game tying three pointer at the end of regulation and Chris Bosh's game winning block against Danny Green, rated Game 6 of the 2013 NBA Finals as one of the greatest NBA Finals games ever played.
- Game 7: The Miami Heat won their second consecutive NBA championship with a win over the San Antonio Spurs. The Spurs, on the other hand, lost an NBA Finals series for the first time in franchise history.
- This was the last NBA Finals series ever played under NBA commissioner David Stern, and this was also the last time the NBA Finals were played in the 2–3–2 format. The format was reverted to the 2–2–1–1–1 format beginning in 2014.

== Format ==
The six division winners and 10 other teams with the most wins from each conference qualified for the playoffs. The seedings are based on each team's record; however, a division winner is guaranteed to be ranked at least fourth, regardless of record.

=== Tiebreak procedures ===
The tiebreakers that determine seedings are:

1. Division leader wins tie from team not leading a division
2. Head-to-head record
3. Division record (if all the tied teams are in the same division)
4. Conference record
5. Record vs. playoff teams, own conference
6. Record vs. playoff teams, other conference (only in two-way tie)
7. Point differential, all games

If there were more than two teams tied, the team that wins the tiebreaker gets the highest seed, while the other teams were "re-broken" from the first step until all ties were resolved. Since the three division winners were guaranteed a spot in the top four, ties to determine the division winners had to be broken before any other ties.

== Playoff qualifying ==
=== Eastern Conference ===
Seed	Team	Record	Clinched			
Seed	Team	Record	Playoff berth	Division title	Best record in Conference	Best record in NBA
1	Miami Heat	66–16	March 8	March 18	March 29	April 10
2	New York Knicks	54–28	March 22	April 9	—	—
3	Indiana Pacers	49-33	March 21	April 7	—	—
4	Brooklyn Nets	49–33	March 21	—	—	—
5	Chicago Bulls	45–37	March 27	—	—	—
6	Atlanta Hawks	44–38	March 27	—	—	—
7	Boston Celtics	42-40	April 3	—	—	—
8	Milwaukee Bucks	38–44	April 6	—	—	—

— = Did not achieve

=== Western Conference ===
Seed	Team	Record	Clinched			
Seed	Team	Record	Playoff berth	Division title	Best record in Conference	Best record in NBA
1	Oklahoma City Thunder	60–22	March 15	April 12	April 15	—
2	San Antonio Spurs	58–24	March 14	April 6	—	—
3	Denver Nuggets	57–25	March 23	—	—	—
4	Los Angeles Clippers	56–26 (Note: Los Angeles Clippers clinched #4 seed over Memphis Grizzlies based on winning Pacific Division; and home court advantage based on a 3–1 regular season series record.)	March 22	April 7	—	—
5	Memphis Grizzlies	56–26	March 27	—	—	—
6	Golden State Warriors	47–35	April 9	—	—	—
7	Los Angeles Lakers	45–37 (Note: Los Angeles Lakers clinched #7 seed over Houston Rockets based on Western Conference winning percentage (0.538 vs. 0.462).)	April 17	—	—	—
8	Houston Rockets	45–37	April 9	—	—	—

— = Did not achieve

== Bracket ==
Teams in bold advanced to the next round. The numbers to the left of each team indicate the team's seeding in its conference, and the numbers to the right indicate the number of games the team won in that round. The division champions are marked by an asterisk. Home court advantage for the playoffs does not necessarily belong to the higher-seeded team, but instead the team with the better regular season record. Teams with home court advantage are shown in italics. If two teams with the same record meet in a round, standard tiebreaker rules are used. The rule for determining home court advantage in the NBA Finals is head-to-head record followed by record vs. opposite conference.

First Round	Conference Semifinals
**E1**	**Miami***	**4**
E8	Milwaukee	0
**E1**	**Miami***	**4**
E5	Chicago	1
E4	Brooklyn	3
**E5**	**Chicago**	**4**
**Eastern Conference**
**E3**	**Indiana***	**4**
E6	Atlanta	2
**E3**	**Indiana***	**4**
E2	New York*	2
**E2**	**New York***	**4**
E7	Boston	2
**W1**	**Oklahoma City***	**4**
W8	Houston	2
W1	Oklahoma City*	1
**W5**	**Memphis**	**4**
W4	LA Clippers*	2
**W5**	**Memphis**	**4**
**Western Conference**
W3	Denver	2
**W6**	**Golden State**	**4**
W6	Golden State	2
**W2**	**San Antonio***	**4**
**W2**	**San Antonio***	**4**
W7	LA Lakers	0

Conference Finals
**E1**	**Miami***	**4**
E3	Indiana*	3
W5	Memphis	0
**W2**	**San Antonio***	**4**

NBA Finals
**E1**	**Miami***	**4**
W2	San Antonio*	3

- * Division winner
- **Bold** Series winner
- Italic Team with home-court advantage

== First round ==
All times are in Eastern Daylight Time (UTC−4)

=== Eastern Conference first round ===
==== (1) Miami Heat vs. (8) Milwaukee Bucks ====
TNT

April 21
7:00 pm

Boxscore

Milwaukee Bucks 87, Miami Heat 110
Scoring by quarter: 24–26, 21–26, 20–28, 22–30
Pts: Brandon Jennings 26; Rebs: Ersan İlyasova 6 Asts: Ellis, Redick 3 each	Pts: LeBron James 27; Rebs: LeBron James 8 Asts: LeBron James 10
Miami leads series, 1–0

American Airlines Arena, Miami, Florida
Attendance: 20,006
Referees: James Capers, Bennett Salvatore, Sean Corbin

NBA TV

April 23
7:30 pm

Boxscore

Milwaukee Bucks 86, Miami Heat 98
Scoring by quarter: 23–25, 20–22, 22–21, 21–30
Pts: Ersan İlyasova 21; Rebs: Ersan İlyasova 6 Asts: Monta Ellis 5	Pts: Dwyane Wade 21; Rebs: LeBron James 8 Asts: LeBron James 6
Miami leads series, 2–0

American Airlines Arena, Miami, Florida
Attendance: 20,097
Referees: Tony Brothers, Ron Garretson, Zach Zarba

TNT

April 25
7:00 pm

Boxscore

Miami Heat 104, Milwaukee Bucks 91
Scoring by quarter: 21–30, 27–20, 30–18, 26–23
Pts: Ray Allen 23; Rebs: Chris Bosh 14; Asts: Dwyane Wade 11	Pts: Jennings, Sanders 16 each Rebs: Larry Sanders 11; Asts: Brandon Jennings 8
Miami leads series, 3–0

BMO Harris Bradley Center, Milwaukee, Wisconsin
Attendance: 18,165
Referees: Scott Foster, Bill Kennedy, Scott Wall

ABC

April 28
3:30 pm

Boxscore

Miami Heat 88, Milwaukee Bucks 77
Scoring by quarter: 24–17, 21–24, 22–21, 21–15
Pts: LeBron James 30; Rebs: LeBron James 8 Asts: LeBron James 7	Pts: Monta Ellis 21; Rebs: Larry Sanders 11; Asts: Monta Ellis 8
Miami wins series, 4–0

BMO Harris Bradley Center, Milwaukee, Wisconsin
Attendance: 18,717
Referees: Danny Crawford, Marc Davis, Michael Smith

Regular-season series

Miami won 3–1 in the regular-season series

November 21, 2012

Recap

Milwaukee Bucks 106, Miami Heat 113

American Airlines Arena, Miami

December 29, 2012

Recap

Miami Heat 85, Milwaukee Bucks 104

BMO Harris Bradley Center, Milwaukee, Wisconsin

March 15, 2013

Recap

Miami Heat 107, Milwaukee Bucks 94

BMO Harris Bradley Center, Milwaukee, Wisconsin

April 9, 2013

Recap

Milwaukee Bucks 83, Miami Heat 94

American Airlines Arena, Miami

This was the first playoff meeting between the Heat and the Bucks.

==== (2) New York Knicks vs. (7) Boston Celtics ====
ABC

April 20
3:00 pm

Boxscore

Boston Celtics 78, New York Knicks 85
Scoring by quarter: 29–26, 24–23, 17–18, 8–18
Pts: Jeff Green 26; Rebs: Brandon Bass 10; Asts: Paul Pierce 7	Pts: Carmelo Anthony 36; Rebs: Kenyon Martin 9 Asts: Raymond Felton 6
New York leads series, 1–0

Madison Square Garden, New York City
Attendance: 19,033
Referees: Monty McCutchen, Bill Spooner, Gary Zielinski

TNT

April 23
8:00 pm

Boxscore

Boston Celtics 71, New York Knicks 87
Scoring by quarter: 20–26, 28–16, 11–32, 12–13
Pts: Paul Pierce 18; Rebs: Kevin Garnett 11; Asts: Paul Pierce 6	Pts: Carmelo Anthony 34; Rebs: Kenyon Martin 11; Asts: Pablo Prigioni 5
New York leads series, 2–0

Madison Square Garden, New York City
Attendance: 19,033
Referees: Derrick Stafford, David Jones, Rodney Mott

ESPN

April 26
8:00 pm

Boxscore

New York Knicks 90, Boston Celtics 76
Scoring by quarter: 23–18, 24–13, 21–21, 22–24
Pts: Carmelo Anthony 26; Rebs: Chandler, Shumpert 8 each Asts: Raymond Felton 10	Pts: Jeff Green 21; Rebs: Kevin Garnett 17; Asts: Paul Pierce 5
New York leads series, 3–0

TD Garden, Boston
Attendance: 18,624
Referees: Danny Crawford, Marc Davis, Michael Smith

ABC

April 28
1:00 pm

Boxscore

New York Knicks 90, Boston Celtics 97 (OT)
Scoring by quarter: 17–22, 18–32, 30–14, 19–16, Overtime: 6–13
Pts: Carmelo Anthony 36; Rebs: Iman Shumpert 12; Asts: Raymond Felton 3	Pts: Paul Pierce 29; Rebs: Kevin Garnett 17; Asts: Garnett, Pierce 6 each
New York leads series, 3–1

TD Garden, Boston
Attendance: 18,624
Referees: Scott Foster, Derrick Collins, Bill Kennedy

TNT

May 1
7:00 pm

Boxscore

Boston Celtics 92, New York Knicks 86
Scoring by quarter: 20–22, 25–17, 24–21, 23–26
Pts: Jeff Green 18; Rebs: Kevin Garnett 18; Asts: Kevin Garnett 5	Pts: Carmelo Anthony 22; Rebs: Tyson Chandler 11; Asts: Raymond Felton 4
New York leads series, 3–2

Madison Square Garden, New York City
Attendance: 19,033
Referees: Joe Crawford, James Capers, Sean Corbin

ESPN

May 3
7:00 pm

Boxscore

New York Knicks 88, Boston Celtics 80
Scoring by quarter: 24–10, 15–17, 28–20, 21–33
Pts: Carmelo Anthony 21; Rebs: Tyson Chandler 12; Asts: Raymond Felton 7	Pts: Jeff Green 21; Rebs: Kevin Garnett 10; Asts: Paul Pierce 5
New York wins series, 4–2

TD Garden, Boston
Attendance: 18,624
Referees: Ken Mauer, Ed Malloy, Bennett Salvatore

Regular-season series

New York won 3–1 in the regular-season series

January 7, 2013

Recap

Boston Celtics 102, New York Knicks 96

Madison Square Garden, New York City

January 24, 2013

Recap

New York Knicks 89, Boston Celtics 86

TD Garden, Boston

March 26, 2013

Recap

New York Knicks 100, Boston Celtics 85

TD Garden, Boston

March 31, 2013

Recap

Boston Celtics 89, New York Knicks 108

Madison Square Garden, New York City

This was the 15th playoff meeting between these two teams, with the Celtics winning eight of the first 14 meetings.

Previous playoff series
Boston leads 8–6 in all-time playoff series

1951

Boston Celtics 0, New York Knicks 2

1951 Eastern Division Semifinals

1952

Boston Celtics 1, New York Knicks 2

1952 Eastern Division Semifinals

1953

Boston Celtics 1, New York Knicks 3

1953 Eastern Division Finals

1954

Boston Celtics 2, New York Knicks 0

1954 Eastern Division Round Robin Semifinals

1955

Boston Celtics 2, New York Knicks 1

1955 Eastern Division Semifinals

1967

Boston Celtics 3, New York Knicks 1

1967 Eastern Division Semifinals

1969

Boston Celtics 4, New York Knicks 2

1969 Eastern Division Finals

1972

Boston Celtics 1, New York Knicks 4

1972 Eastern Conference Finals

1973

Boston Celtics 3, New York Knicks 4

1973 Eastern Conference Finals

1974

Boston Celtics 4, New York Knicks 1

1974 Eastern Conference Finals

1984

Boston Celtics 4, New York Knicks 3

1984 Eastern Conference Semifinals

1988

Boston Celtics 3, New York Knicks 1

1988 Eastern Conference First Round

1990

Boston Celtics 2, New York Knicks 3

1990 Eastern Conference First Round

2011

Boston Celtics 4, New York Knicks 0

2011 Eastern Conference First Round

- Game 6 marked Paul Pierce and Kevin Garnett's final game as Celtics, as both of them, along with Jason Terry would be traded to the Brooklyn Nets in the off-season.
- This was the last the Celtics & Knicks faced off in the playoffs until 2025.
- This would be the Knicks last playoff series win until 2023.

==== (3) Indiana Pacers vs. (6) Atlanta Hawks ====
TNT

April 21
1:00 pm

Boxscore

Atlanta Hawks 90, Indiana Pacers 107
Scoring by quarter: 26–34, 24–24, 19–26, 21–23
Pts: Jeff Teague 21; Rebs: Josh Smith 8 Asts: Jeff Teague 7	Pts: Paul George 23; Rebs: Paul George 11; Asts: Paul George 12
Indiana leads series, 1–0

Bankers Life Fieldhouse, Indianapolis
Attendance: 18,165
Referees: Derrick Stafford, David Jones, Rodney Mott

NBA TV

April 24
7:30 pm

Boxscore

Atlanta Hawks 98, Indiana Pacers 113
Scoring by quarter: 19–25, 31–34, 26–29, 22–25
Pts: Devin Harris 17; Rebs: Al Horford 10; Asts: Al Horford 5	Pts: Paul George 27; Rebs: Roy Hibbert 9 Asts: five players 3 each
Indiana leads series, 2–0

Bankers Life Fieldhouse, Indianapolis
Attendance: 18,165
Referees: Ken Mauer, Ed Malloy, Sean Wright

ESPN

April 27
7:00 pm

Boxscore

Indiana Pacers 69, Atlanta Hawks 90
Scoring by quarter: 14–27, 16–27, 19–21, 20–15
Pts: David West 18; Rebs: George, Hibbert, Hansbrough 9 each Asts: George Hill 3	Pts: Al Horford 26; Rebs: Al Horford 16; Asts: Josh Smith 6
Indiana leads series, 2–1

Philips Arena, Atlanta
Attendance: 18,238
Referees: Mike Callahan, Scott Wall, Tom Washington

NBA TV

April 29
7:30 pm

Boxscore

Indiana Pacers 91, Atlanta Hawks 102
Scoring by quarter: 21–22, 19–35, 22–12, 29–33
Pts: Paul George 21; Rebs: Paul George 12; Asts: Lance Stephenson 8	Pts: Josh Smith 29; Rebs: Josh Smith 11; Asts: Teague, Harris 6 each
Series tied, 2–2

Philips Arena, Atlanta
Attendance: 18,165
Referees: Joe Crawford, Tony Brown, James Capers

NBA TV

May 1
7:30 pm

Boxscore

Atlanta Hawks 83, Indiana Pacers 106
Scoring by quarter: 22–21, 21–29, 24–31, 16–25
Pts: Smith, Horford 14 each Rebs: Al Horford 9 Asts: Jeff Teague 5	Pts: David West 24; Rebs: Lance Stephenson 12; Asts: George Hill 10
Indiana leads series, 3–2

Bankers Life Fieldhouse, Indianapolis
Attendance: 18,165
Referees: Monty McCutchen, Derrick Collins, Bennett Salvatore

ESPN2

May 3
7:00 pm

Boxscore

Indiana Pacers 81, Atlanta Hawks 73
Scoring by quarter: 21–20, 16–9, 28–21, 16–23
Pts: Hill, West 21 each Rebs: Hibbert, Stephenson 11 each Asts: Paul George 7	Pts: Al Horford 15; Rebs: Josh Smith 9 Asts: Smith, Horford, Harris 3 each
Indiana wins series, 4–2

Philips Arena, Atlanta
Attendance: 18,238
Referees: Tony Brothers, Ron Garretson, Zach Zarba

Regular-season series

Tied 2–2 in the regular-season series

November 7, 2012

Recap

Indiana Pacers 86, Atlanta Hawks 89

Philips Arena, Atlanta

December 29, 2012

Recap

Indiana Pacers 100, Atlanta Hawks 109

Philips Arena, Atlanta

February 5, 2013

Recap

Atlanta Hawks 103, Indiana Pacers 114

Bankers Life Fieldhouse, Indianapolis

March 25, 2013

Recap

Atlanta Hawks 94, Indiana Pacers 100

Bankers Life Fieldhouse, Indianapolis

This was the fifth playoff meeting between these two teams, with the each team winning two series apiece.

Previous playoff series
Tied 2–2 in all-time playoff series

1987

Atlanta Hawks 3, Indiana Pacers 1

1987 Eastern Conference First Round

1994

Atlanta Hawks 2, Indiana Pacers 4

1994 Eastern Conference Semifinals

1995

Atlanta Hawks 0, Indiana Pacers 3

1995 Eastern Conference First Round

1996

Atlanta Hawks 3, Indiana Pacers 2

1996 Eastern Conference First Round

==== (4) Brooklyn Nets vs. (5) Chicago Bulls ====
ESPN

April 20
8:00 pm

Boxscore

Chicago Bulls 89, Brooklyn Nets 106
Scoring by quarter: 14–25, 21–35, 27–29, 27–17
Pts: Carlos Boozer 25; Rebs: Carlos Boozer 8 Asts: Carlos Boozer 4	Pts: Deron Williams 22; Rebs: Reggie Evans 13; Asts: Deron Williams 7
Brooklyn leads series, 1–0

Barclays Center, Brooklyn, New York City
Attendance: 17,732
Referees: Ken Mauer, Ed Malloy, Sean Wright

The Nets led wire-to-wire as they routed the Bulls 106–89 to take a 1–0 series lead. A dominant first half allowed the Nets to put the game away early as they outscored the Bulls 25–14 in the first quarter and 35–21 in the second quarter, building a 60–35 halftime lead.

TNT

April 22
8:00 pm

Boxscore

Chicago Bulls 90, Brooklyn Nets 82
Scoring by quarter: 20–17, 27–29, 22–11, 21–25
Pts: Luol Deng 15; Rebs: Carlos Boozer 12; Asts: Kirk Hinrich 5	Pts: Brook Lopez 21; Rebs: Reggie Evans 8 Asts: Deron Williams 10
Series tied, 1–1

Barclays Center, Brooklyn, New York City
Attendance: 17,732
Referees: Monty McCutchen, Bill Spooner, Gary Zielinski

Following their embarrassing Game 1 loss, the Bulls bounced back with a 90–82 win, evening the series at 1–1 and stealing homecourt advantage. The Bulls took control of the game in the third quarter, outscoring the Nets 22–11 in the period and building a 12-point 4th quarter lead. The Nets attempted to rally, but the Bulls made enough clutch shots to hold them off. After scoring 89 points through 3 quarters in Game 1 (and 106 for the game), the Nets were held to 82 points for all of Game 2.

NBA TV

April 25
8:30 pm

Boxscore

Brooklyn Nets 76, Chicago Bulls 79
Scoring by quarter: 17–19, 17–22, 18–24, 24–14
Pts: Brook Lopez 22; Rebs: Reggie Evans 12; Asts: Deron Williams 4	Pts: Carlos Boozer 22; Rebs: Carlos Boozer 16; Asts: Boozer, Deng 3 each
Chicago leads series, 2–1

United Center, Chicago
Attendance: 21,672
Referees: Joe Crawford, James Capers, Sean Corbin

The Bulls took a 2–1 series lead with a 79–76 victory. Despite squandering most of a huge fourth quarter lead, the Bulls hung on to win when C.J. Watson airballed a game-tying three-pointer at the buzzer.

TNT

April 27
2:00 pm

Boxscore

Brooklyn Nets 134, Chicago Bulls 142 (3OT)
Scoring by quarter: 26–25, 29–33, 29–18, 27–35, Overtime: 10–10, 6–6, 7–15
Pts: Deron Williams 32; Rebs: Reggie Evans 13; Asts: Deron Williams 10	Pts: Nate Robinson 34; Rebs: Joakim Noah 13; Asts: Kirk Hinrich 14
Chicago leads series, 3–1

United Center, Chicago
Attendance: 21,758
Referees: Tony Brothers, Ron Garretson, Eric Lewis

The Bulls stunned the Nets and took a commanding 3–1 series lead with a 142–134 victory in triple overtime. The Nets trailed 58–55 at halftime. However, they outscored the Bulls 29–18 in the third quarter and led by 8 points heading into the fourth quarter. With less than 3 minutes to go, the Nets extended their lead to 14, and the Bulls trailed 109–95. However, the Bulls would go on a 16–2 run to force the first of three overtimes. Nate Robinson caught fire, scoring 23 points in the 4th quarter, including 12 unanswered points as the Bulls cut the deficit to 109–107 with just over one minute remaining. Carlos Boozer then scored the game-tying bucket to even the game at 109. On the Nets' next possession, Brook Lopez was fouled. He made both free throws to put the Nets up 111–109. The Bulls drew up a play to give Luol Deng a go-ahead corner three. Deng missed the three, but Joakim Noah grabbed two offensive rebounds and tied the game at 111–111. Deron Williams attempted to win the game at the end of regulation, but his shot rimmed out, and the Bulls forced overtime. During the overtimes, several players fouled out. For the Nets, Gerald Wallace and Reggie Evans would foul out while Robinson, Noah, and Gibson would foul out for the Bulls. The Bulls would go on to win the game in triple overtime as they pushed the Nets to the brink of elimination.

TNT

April 29
7:00 pm

Boxscore

Chicago Bulls 91, Brooklyn Nets 110
Scoring by quarter: 21–26, 23–26, 29–25, 18–33
Pts: Nate Robinson 20; Rebs: Carlos Boozer 10; Asts: Nate Robinson 8	Pts: Brook Lopez 28; Rebs: Reggie Evans 12; Asts: Deron Williams 10
Chicago leads series, 3–2

Barclays Center, Brooklyn, New York City
Attendance: 17,732
Referees: Mike Callahan, Tom Washington, Zach Zarba

TNT

May 2
8:00 pm

Boxscore

Brooklyn Nets 95, Chicago Bulls 92
Scoring by quarter: 33–27, 27–27, 15–17, 20–21
Pts: three players 17 each Rebs: Reggie Evans 15; Asts: Deron Williams 11	Pts: Marco Belinelli 22; Rebs: Joakim Noah 15; Asts: Marco Belinelli 7
Series tied, 3–3

United Center, Chicago
Attendance: 21,810
Referees: Scott Foster, John Goble, Bill Kennedy

TNT

May 4
8:00 pm

Boxscore

Chicago Bulls 99, Brooklyn Nets 93
Scoring by quarter: 29–25, 32–19, 21–31, 17–18
Pts: Belinelli, Noah 24 each Rebs: Joakim Noah 14; Asts: Butler, Robinson 4 each	Pts: Deron Williams 24; Rebs: Reggie Evans 13; Asts: Deron Williams 7
Chicago wins series, 4–3

Barclays Center, Brooklyn, New York City
Attendance: 17,732
Referees: Monty McCutchen, James Capers, Jason Phillips

The Bulls entered this game without the services of Derrick Rose, Luol Deng, and Kirk Hinrich, but almost blew a 3–1 series lead to the Nets. However, the Bulls dominated the first half, building a 61–44 halftime lead. In the second half, the Nets fought back as they cut the deficit to 4, but they got no closer as the Bulls prevailed with a 99–93 victory. It was the first time that the Bulls had won a Game 7 on the road in franchise history, becoming the 7th NBA road team to do so after leading series 3–1. They were 0–6 in their last 6 road Game 7's. This was also Gerald Wallace's last game as a Net.

Regular-season series

Chicago won 3–1 in the regular-season series

December 15, 2012

Recap

Brooklyn Nets 82, Chicago Bulls 83

United Center, Chicago, Illinois

February 1, 2013

Recap

Chicago Bulls 89, Brooklyn Nets 93

Barclays Center, Brooklyn, New York City

March 2, 2013

Recap

Brooklyn Nets 85, Chicago Bulls 96

United Center, Chicago, Illinois

April 4, 2013

Recap

Chicago Bulls 92, Brooklyn Nets 90

Barclays Center, Brooklyn, New York City

This was the second playoff meeting between these two teams, with the Bulls winning the first meeting. All previous meetings took place while the Nets were in New Jersey.

Previous playoff series
Chicago leads 1–0 in all-time playoff series

1998

Chicago Bulls 3, New Jersey Nets 0

1998 Eastern Conference First Round

=== Western Conference first round ===
==== (1) Oklahoma City Thunder vs. (8) Houston Rockets ====
TNT

April 21
9:30 pm

Boxscore

Houston Rockets 91, Oklahoma City Thunder 120
Scoring by quarter: 19–26, 28–34, 19–29, 25–31
Pts: James Harden 20; Rebs: Terrence Jones 8 Asts: Lin, Beverley 4 each	Pts: Kevin Durant 24; Rebs: Russell Westbrook 8 Asts: Russell Westbrook 10
Oklahoma City leads series, 1–0

Chesapeake Energy Arena, Oklahoma City, Oklahoma
Attendance: 18,203
Referees: Ron Garretson, Tony Brothers, Zach Zarba

TNT

April 24
7:00 pm

Boxscore

Houston Rockets 102, Oklahoma City Thunder 105
Scoring by quarter: 28–29, 27–28, 17–21, 30–27
Pts: James Harden 36; Rebs: Ömer Aşık 14; Asts: Harden, Beverley 6 each	Pts: Durant, Westbrook 29 each Rebs: Serge Ibaka 11; Asts: Kevin Durant 9
Oklahoma City leads series, 2–0

Chesapeake Energy Arena, Oklahoma City, Oklahoma
Attendance: 18,203
Referees: Danny Crawford, Marc Davis, Jason Phillips

ESPN

April 27
9:30 pm

Boxscore

Oklahoma City Thunder 104, Houston Rockets 101
Scoring by quarter: 39–19, 27–30, 14–27, 24–25
Pts: Kevin Durant 41; Rebs: Kevin Durant 14; Asts: Kevin Durant 4	Pts: James Harden 30; Rebs: Aşık, Harden 8 each Asts: Chandler Parsons 7
Oklahoma City leads series, 3–0

Toyota Center, Houston, Texas
Attendance: 18,163
Referees: Joe Crawford, Tony Brown, James Capers

TNT

April 29
9:30 pm

Boxscore

Oklahoma City Thunder 103, Houston Rockets 105
Scoring by quarter: 24–29, 36–24, 24–38, 19–14
Pts: Kevin Durant 38; Rebs: Kevin Durant 8 Asts: Kevin Durant 6	Pts: Chandler Parsons 27; Rebs: Ömer Aşık 14; Asts: Chandler Parsons 8
Oklahoma City leads series, 3–1

Toyota Center, Houston, Texas
Attendance: 18,081
Referees: Monty McCutchen, Pat Fraher, Bennett Salvatore

TNT

May 1
9:30 pm

Boxscore

Houston Rockets 107, Oklahoma City Thunder 100
Scoring by quarter: 30–26, 20–17, 37–32, 20–25
Pts: James Harden 31; Rebs: Ömer Aşık 11; Asts: Chandler Parsons 4	Pts: Kevin Durant 36; Rebs: Serge Ibaka 9 Asts: Kevin Durant 7
Oklahoma City leads series, 3–2

Chesapeake Energy Arena, Oklahoma City, Oklahoma
Attendance: 18,203
Referees: Ken Mauer, Ed Malloy, Bill Spooner

ESPN

May 3
9:30 pm

Boxscore

Oklahoma City Thunder 103, Houston Rockets 94
Scoring by quarter: 26–29, 32–25, 20–23, 25–17
Pts: Kevin Durant 27; Rebs: Nick Collison 9 Asts: Reggie Jackson 8	Pts: James Harden 26; Rebs: Ömer Aşık 13; Asts: James Harden 7
Oklahoma City wins series, 4–2

Toyota Center, Houston, Texas
Attendance: 18,357
Referees: Mike Callahan, Sean Corbin, Tom Washington

Regular-season series

Oklahoma City won 2–1 in the regular-season series

November 28, 2012

Recap

Houston Rockets 98, Oklahoma City Thunder 120

Chesapeake Energy Arena, Oklahoma City, Oklahoma

December 29, 2012

Recap

Oklahoma City Thunder 124, Houston Rockets 94

Toyota Center, Houston, Texas

February 20, 2013

Recap

Oklahoma City Thunder 119, Houston Rockets 122

Toyota Center, Houston, Texas

This was the seventh playoff meeting between these two teams, with the Thunder/SuperSonics franchise winning five of the first six meetings. All previous meetings took place while the Thunder franchise were still known as the Seattle SuperSonics.

Previous playoff series
Oklahoma City/Seattle leads 5–1 in all-time playoff series

1982

Houston Rockets 1, Seattle SuperSonics 2

1982 Western Conference First Round

1987

Houston Rockets 2, Seattle SuperSonics 4

1987 Western Conference Semifinals

1989

Houston Rockets 0, Seattle SuperSonics 3

1989 Western Conference First Round

1993

Houston Rockets 3, Seattle SuperSonics 4

1993 Western Conference Semifinals

1996

Houston Rockets 0, Seattle SuperSonics 4

1996 Western Conference Semifinals

1997

Houston Rockets 4, Seattle SuperSonics 3

1997 Western Conference Semifinals

==== (2) San Antonio Spurs vs. (7) Los Angeles Lakers ====
ABC

April 21
3:30 pm

Boxscore

Los Angeles Lakers 79, San Antonio Spurs 91
Scoring by quarter: 15–24, 22–21, 20–25, 22–21
Pts: Dwight Howard 20; Rebs: Pau Gasol 16; Asts: Pau Gasol 6	Pts: Parker, Ginóbili 18 each Rebs: Kawhi Leonard 11; Asts: Tony Parker 8
San Antonio leads series, 1–0

AT&T Center, San Antonio
Attendance: 18,581
Referees: Danny Crawford, Marc Davis, Jason Phillips

The Spurs dominated the Lakers in Game 1 and took a 1–0 series lead.

TNT

April 24
9:30 pm

Boxscore

Los Angeles Lakers 91, San Antonio Spurs 102
Scoring by quarter: 23–28, 25–28, 20–22, 23–24
Pts: Howard, Blake 16 each Rebs: Howard, Gasol 9 each Asts: Steve Nash 6	Pts: Tony Parker 28; Rebs: Kawhi Leonard 7 Asts: Parker, Ginóbili 7 each
San Antonio leads series, 2–0

AT&T Center, San Antonio
Attendance: 18,581
Referees: Mike Callahan, David Guthrie, Tom Washington

The Spurs dominated again in Game 2 and took a commanding 2–0 series lead.

ESPN

April 26
10:30 pm

Boxscore

San Antonio Spurs 120, Los Angeles Lakers 89
Scoring by quarter: 30–18, 25–26, 30–19, 35–26
Pts: Tim Duncan 26; Rebs: Tim Duncan 9 Asts: Tony Parker 7	Pts: Dwight Howard 25; Rebs: Pau Gasol 13; Asts: Pau Gasol 10
San Antonio leads series, 3–0

Staples Center, Los Angeles
Attendance: 18,997
Referees: Ken Mauer, Ed Malloy, Leon Wood

The Spurs throttled the Lakers 120–89 and took a commanding 3–0 series lead. For the Lakers, the 31-point loss represented the largest home playoff loss in franchise history.

TNT

April 28
7:00 pm

Boxscore

San Antonio Spurs 103, Los Angeles Lakers 82
Scoring by quarter: 26–20, 26–14, 26–24, 25–24
Pts: Tony Parker 23; Rebs: Kawhi Leonard 7 Asts: Ginóbili, Joseph 6 each	Pts: Pau Gasol 16; Rebs: Gasol, Howard 8 each Asts: Chris Duhon 7
San Antonio wins series, 4–0

Staples Center, Los Angeles
Attendance: 18,997
Referees: Derrick Stafford, Bennie Adams, Rodney Mott

The Spurs completed their sweep of the injury-depleted Lakers, routing them 103–82. Dwight Howard picked up two technical fouls and was ejected in the third quarter. It would end up being his final game with the Lakers until his return to the team in 2019, as well as Kobe Bryant's final playoff game, as the Lakers did not make the playoffs until 2020.

Regular-season series

San Antonio won 2–1 in the regular-season series

November 13, 2012

Recap

San Antonio Spurs 84, Los Angeles Lakers 82

Staples Center, Los Angeles

January 9, 2013

Recap

Los Angeles Lakers 105, San Antonio Spurs 108

AT&T Center, San Antonio

April 14, 2013

Recap

San Antonio Spurs 86, Los Angeles Lakers 91

Staples Center, Los Angeles

This was the 12th playoff meeting between these two teams, with the Lakers winning eight of the first 11 meetings.

Previous playoff series
Los Angeles leads 8–3 in all-time playoff series

1982

Los Angeles Lakers 4, San Antonio Spurs 0

1982 Western Conference Finals

1983

Los Angeles Lakers 4, San Antonio Spurs 2

1983 Western Conference Finals

1986

Los Angeles Lakers 3, San Antonio Spurs 0

1986 Western Conference First Round

1988

Los Angeles Lakers 3, San Antonio Spurs 0

1988 Western Conference First Round

1995

Los Angeles Lakers 2, San Antonio Spurs 4

1995 Western Conference Semifinals

1999

Los Angeles Lakers 0, San Antonio Spurs 4

1999 Western Conference Semifinals

2001

Los Angeles Lakers 4, San Antonio Spurs 0

2001 Western Conference Finals

2002

Los Angeles Lakers 4, San Antonio Spurs 1

2002 Western Conference Semifinals

2003

Los Angeles Lakers 2, San Antonio Spurs 4

2003 Western Conference Semifinals

2004

Los Angeles Lakers 4, San Antonio Spurs 2

2004 Western Conference Semifinals

2008

Los Angeles Lakers 4, San Antonio Spurs 1

2008 Western Conference Finals

==== (3) Denver Nuggets vs. (6) Golden State Warriors ====
ESPN

April 20
5:30 pm

Boxscore

Golden State Warriors 95, Denver Nuggets 97
Scoring by quarter: 25–28, 23–16, 16–27, 31–26
Pts: Klay Thompson 22; Rebs: Lee, Bogut 14 each Asts: Jarrett Jack 10	Pts: Andre Miller 28; Rebs: Wilson Chandler 13; Asts: Iguodala, Miller 5 each
Denver leads series, 1–0

Pepsi Center, Denver, Colorado
Attendance: 19,155
Referees: Mike Callahan, David Guthrie, Tom Washington

- In Game 1, Andre Miller hit the game-winning layup with 1.3 seconds left.

TNT

April 23
10:30 pm

Boxscore

Golden State Warriors 131, Denver Nuggets 117
Scoring by quarter: 26–28, 35–25, 35–27, 35–37
Pts: Stephen Curry 30; Rebs: Andrew Bogut 8 Asts: Stephen Curry 13	Pts: Brewer, Lawson 19 each Rebs: Wilson Chandler 6 Asts: Ty Lawson 12
Series tied, 1–1

Pepsi Center, Denver, Colorado
Attendance: 19,155
Referees: Scott Foster, John Goble, Bill Kennedy

ESPN2

April 26
10:30 pm

Boxscore

Denver Nuggets 108, Golden State Warriors 110
Scoring by quarter: 32–32, 34–22, 18–33, 24–23
Pts: Ty Lawson 35; Rebs: Ty Lawson 10; Asts: Wilson Chandler 9	Pts: Stephen Curry 29; Rebs: Andrew Bogut 9 Asts: Stephen Curry 11
Golden State leads series, 2–1

Oracle Arena, Oakland, California
Attendance: 19,596
Referees: Derrick Stafford, Bennie Adams, Rodney Mott

TNT

April 28
9:30 pm

Boxscore

Denver Nuggets 101, Golden State Warriors 115
Scoring by quarter: 21–25, 23–31, 28–35, 29–24
Pts: Ty Lawson 26; Rebs: Kenneth Faried 12; Asts: Ty Lawson 6	Pts: Stephen Curry 31; Rebs: Draymond Green 6 Asts: Jarrett Jack 9
Golden State leads series, 3–1

Oracle Arena, Oakland, California
Attendance: 19,596
Referees: Ken Mauer, Ed Malloy, Leon Wood

TNT

April 30
8:00 pm

Boxscore

Golden State Warriors 100, Denver Nuggets 107
Scoring by quarter: 22–36, 24–30, 23–20, 31–21
Pts: Harrison Barnes 23; Rebs: Harrison Barnes 9 Asts: Stephen Curry 8	Pts: Andre Iguodala 25; Rebs: Andre Iguodala 12; Asts: Ty Lawson 10
Golden State leads series, 3–2

Pepsi Center, Denver, Colorado
Attendance: 19,155
Referees: Ron Garretson, Tony Brothers, Eric Lewis

TNT

May 2
10:30 pm

Boxscore

Denver Nuggets 88, Golden State Warriors 92
Scoring by quarter: 25–21, 17–19, 20–33, 26–19
Pts: Andre Iguodala 24; Rebs: Kenneth Faried 11; Asts: Iguodala, Lawson 6 each	Pts: Stephen Curry 22; Rebs: Andrew Bogut 21; Asts: Stephen Curry 8
Golden State wins series, 4–2

Oracle Arena, Oakland, California
Attendance: 19,596
Referees: Danny Crawford, Marc Davis, Michael Smith

Regular-season series

Denver won 3–1 in the regular-season series

November 10, 2012

Recap

Denver Nuggets 107, Golden State Warriors 101 (2OT)

Oracle Arena, Oakland, California

November 23, 2012

Recap

Golden State Warriors 91, Denver Nuggets 102

Pepsi Center, Denver, Colorado

November 29, 2012

Recap

Denver Nuggets 105, Golden State Warriors 106

Oracle Arena, Oakland, California

January 13, 2013

Recap

Golden State Warriors 105, Denver Nuggets 116

Pepsi Center, Denver, Colorado

This was the first playoff meeting between the Warriors and the Nuggets.

==== (4) Los Angeles Clippers vs. (5) Memphis Grizzlies ====
ESPN

April 20
10:30 pm

Boxscore

Memphis Grizzlies 91, Los Angeles Clippers 112
Scoring by quarter: 21–29, 30–28, 18–18, 22–37
Pts: Jerryd Bayless 19; Rebs: Ed Davis 6 Asts: Marc Gasol 7	Pts: Chris Paul 23; Rebs: DeAndre Jordan 8 Asts: Chris Paul 7
LA Clippers lead series, 1–0

Staples Center, Los Angeles
Attendance: 19,373
Referees: Scott Foster, John Goble, Bill Kennedy

TNT

April 22
10:30 pm

Boxscore

Memphis Grizzlies 91, Los Angeles Clippers 93
Scoring by quarter: 26–26, 18–24, 27–25, 20–18
Pts: Mike Conley Jr. 28; Rebs: Tony Allen 10; Asts: Mike Conley Jr. 9	Pts: Chris Paul 24; Rebs: Blake Griffin 8 Asts: Chris Paul 9
LA Clippers lead series, 2–0

Staples Center, Los Angeles
Attendance: 19,276
Referees: Mike Callahan, David Guthrie, Tom Washington

TNT

April 25
9:30 pm

Boxscore

Los Angeles Clippers 82, Memphis Grizzlies 94
Scoring by quarter: 20–23, 19–24, 23–23, 20–24
Pts: Blake Griffin 16; Rebs: DeAndre Jordan 8 Asts: Chris Paul 4	Pts: Zach Randolph 27; Rebs: Zach Randolph 11; Asts: Mike Conley Jr. 10
LA Clippers lead series, 2–1

FedExForum, Memphis, Tennessee
Attendance: 18,119
Referees: Ron Garretson, Tony Brothers, Eric Lewis

TNT

April 27
4:30 pm

Boxscore

Los Angeles Clippers 83, Memphis Grizzlies 104
Scoring by quarter: 25–33, 22–13, 20–25, 16–33
Pts: Griffin, Paul 19 each Rebs: Blake Griffin 10; Asts: Chris Paul 6	Pts: Gasol, Randolph 24 each Rebs: Marc Gasol 13; Asts: Mike Conley Jr. 13
Series tied, 2–2

FedExForum, Memphis, Tennessee
Attendance: 18,119
Referees: Monty McCutchen, Pat Fraher, Bennett Salvatore

TNT

April 30
10:30 pm

Boxscore

Memphis Grizzlies 103, Los Angeles Clippers 93
Scoring by quarter: 26–28, 28–20, 19–17, 30–28
Pts: Zach Randolph 25; Rebs: Zach Randolph 11; Asts: Mike Conley Jr. 6	Pts: Chris Paul 35; Rebs: Matt Barnes 9 Asts: Blake Griffin 5
Memphis leads series, 3–2

Staples Center, Los Angeles
Attendance: 19,384
Referees: Danny Crawford, Marc Davis, Jason Phillips

ESPN2

May 3
9:30 pm

Boxscore

Los Angeles Clippers 105, Memphis Grizzlies 118
Scoring by quarter: 26–29, 27–29, 26–34, 26–26
Pts: Matt Barnes 30; Rebs: Matt Barnes 10; Asts: Chris Paul 8	Pts: Randolph, Conley 23 each Rebs: Allen, Gasol 7 each Asts: Mike Conley Jr. 7
Memphis wins series, 4–2

FedExForum, Memphis, Tennessee
Attendance: 18,119
Referees: Joe Crawford, Rodney Mott, Derrick Stafford

Regular-season series

Los Angeles won 3–1 in the regular-season series

October 31, 2012

Recap

Memphis Grizzlies 92, Los Angeles Clippers 101

Staples Center, Los Angeles

January 14, 2013

Recap

Los Angeles Clippers 99, Memphis Grizzlies 73

FedExForum, Memphis, Tennessee

March 13, 2013

Recap

Memphis Grizzlies 96, Los Angeles Clippers 85

Staples Center, Los Angeles

April 13, 2013

Recap

Los Angeles Clippers 91, Memphis Grizzlies 87

FedExForum, Memphis, Tennessee

This was the second playoff meeting between these two teams, with the Clippers winning the first meeting.

Previous playoff series
Los Angeles leads 1–0 in all-time playoff series

2012

Los Angeles Clippers 4, Memphis Grizzlies 3

2012 Western Conference First Round

== Conference semifinals ==
=== Eastern Conference semifinals ===
==== (1) Miami Heat vs. (5) Chicago Bulls ====
TNT

May 6
7:00 pm

Boxscore

Chicago Bulls 93, Miami Heat 86
Scoring by quarter: 21–15, 16–22, 21–25, 35–24
Pts: Nate Robinson 27; Rebs: Jimmy Butler 14; Asts: Nate Robinson 9	Pts: LeBron James 24; Rebs: LeBron James 8 Asts: James, Chalmers 7 each
Chicago leads series, 1–0

American Airlines Arena, Miami
Attendance: 19,685
Referees: Ken Mauer, Ed Malloy, Tom Washington

The Bulls stunned the Heat in Game 1 with a 93–86 victory. The game was close throughout, with neither team leading by more than 8 points. The Heat entered the fourth quarter with a 62–58 lead and led 86–83 with just over two minutes to play when the Bulls scored the game's final 10 points. After giving up only 37 points in the first half, the Heat's defense allowed the Bulls to score 35 points in the 4th quarter alone. After Marco Bellinelli's game-tying three-pointer knotted the game at 86, Nate Robinson took over, scoring two consecutive shots to put the Bulls up 90–86 with just over 40 seconds left. On the Heat's next two possessions, LeBron James would shoot an airball and miss a long three-pointer, and Nate Robinson made enough free throws to seal the win and help the Bulls steal homecourt advantage.

TNT

May 8
7:00 pm

Boxscore

Chicago Bulls 78, Miami Heat 115
Scoring by quarter: 20–25, 21–30, 15–30, 22–30
Pts: Marco Belinelli 13; Rebs: Joakim Noah 6 Asts: Marco Belinelli 6	Pts: Ray Allen 21; Rebs: Norris Cole 6 Asts: LeBron James 9
Series tied, 1–1

American Airlines Arena, Miami
Attendance: 19,817
Referees: Scott Foster, Rodney Mott, Sean Wright

ESPN

May 10
8:00 pm

Boxscore

Miami Heat 104, Chicago Bulls 94
Scoring by quarter: 25–25, 27–25, 18–20, 34–24
Pts: LeBron James 25; Rebs: Chris Bosh 19; Asts: LeBron James 7	Pts: Carlos Boozer 21; Rebs: Joakim Noah 11; Asts: Nate Robinson 7
Miami leads series, 2–1

United Center, Chicago
Attendance: 22,675
Referees: Joe Crawford, David Guthrie, Derrick Stafford

TNT

May 13
7:00 pm

Boxscore

Miami Heat 88, Chicago Bulls 65
Scoring by quarter: 21–15, 23–18, 17–9, 27–23
Pts: LeBron James 27; Rebs: Haslem, James 7 each Asts: LeBron James 8	Pts: Carlos Boozer 14; Rebs: Carlos Boozer 12; Asts: Hamilton, Robinson 4 each
Miami leads series, 3–1

United Center, Chicago
Attendance: 21,990
Referees: Danny Crawford, Marc Davis, Jason Phillips

TNT

May 15
7:00 pm

Boxscore

Chicago Bulls 91, Miami Heat 94
Scoring by quarter: 21–30, 32–17, 24–22, 14–25
Pts: Carlos Boozer 26; Rebs: Carlos Boozer 13; Asts: Nate Robinson 6	Pts: LeBron James 23; Rebs: James, Bosh 7 each Asts: LeBron James 8
Miami wins series, 4–1

American Airlines Arena, Miami
Attendance: 20,025
Referees: Mike Callahan, Tony Brothers, Bennett Salvatore

Regular-season series

Tied 2–2 in the regular-season series

January 4, 2013

Recap

Chicago Bulls 96, Miami Heat 89

American Airlines Arena, Miami

February 21, 2013

Recap

Miami Heat 86, Chicago Bulls 67

United Center, Chicago, Illinois

March 27, 2013

Recap

Miami Heat 97, Chicago Bulls 101

United Center, Chicago, Illinois

April 14, 2013

Recap

Chicago Bulls 93, Miami Heat 105

American Airlines Arena, Miami

This was the seventh playoff meeting between these two teams, with the Bulls winning four of the first six meetings.

Previous playoff series
Chicago leads 4–2 in all-time playoff series

1992

Chicago Bulls 3, Miami Heat 0

1992 Eastern Conference First Round

1996

Chicago Bulls 3, Miami Heat 0

1996 Eastern Conference First Round

1997

Chicago Bulls 4, Miami Heat 1

1997 Eastern Conference Finals

2006

Chicago Bulls 2, Miami Heat 4

2006 Eastern Conference First Round

2007

Chicago Bulls 4, Miami Heat 0

2007 Eastern Conference First Round

2011

Chicago Bulls 1, Miami Heat 4

2011 Eastern Conference Finals

==== (2) New York Knicks vs. (3) Indiana Pacers ====
ABC

May 5
3:30 pm

Boxscore

Indiana Pacers 102, New York Knicks 95
Scoring by quarter: 22–27, 30–19, 29–19, 21–30
Pts: David West 20; Rebs: Lance Stephenson 13; Asts: George Hill 6	Pts: Carmelo Anthony 27; Rebs: Carmelo Anthony 11; Asts: Pablo Prigioni 6
Indiana leads series, 1–0

Madison Square Garden, New York City
Attendance: 19,033
Referees: Danny Crawford, Marc Davis, Michael Smith

TNT

May 7
7:00 pm

Boxscore

Indiana Pacers 79, New York Knicks 105
Scoring by quarter: 20–29, 22–18, 24–25, 13–33
Pts: Paul George 20; Rebs: Roy Hibbert 12; Asts: George Hill 7	Pts: Carmelo Anthony 32; Rebs: Carmelo Anthony 9 Asts: Kidd, Prigioni 4 each
Series tied, 1–1

Madison Square Garden, New York City
Attendance: 19,033
Referees: Joe Crawford, Sean Corbin, Derrick Stafford

ABC

May 11
8:00 pm

Boxscore

New York Knicks 71, Indiana Pacers 82
Scoring by quarter: 15–18, 18–18, 20–26, 18–20
Pts: Carmelo Anthony 21; Rebs: Iman Shumpert 10; Asts: Pablo Prigioni 3	Pts: Roy Hibbert 24; Rebs: West, Hibbert 12 each Asts: Paul George 8
Indiana leads series, 2–1

Bankers Life Fieldhouse, Indianapolis
Attendance: 18,165
Referees: Mike Callahan, Tony Brothers, Zach Zarba

TNT

May 14
7:00 pm

Boxscore

New York Knicks 82, Indiana Pacers 93
Scoring by quarter: 16–23, 18–25, 22–19, 26–26
Pts: Carmelo Anthony 24; Rebs: Tyson Chandler 10; Asts: Raymond Felton 6	Pts: George Hill 26; Rebs: Paul George 14; Asts: Paul George 7
Indiana leads series, 3–1

Bankers Life Fieldhouse, Indianapolis
Attendance: 18,165
Referees: Monty McCutchen, Ron Garretson, Bill Spooner

TNT

May 16
8:00 pm

Boxscore

Indiana Pacers 75, New York Knicks 85
Scoring by quarter: 15–19, 19–21, 23–27, 18–18
Pts: Paul George 23; Rebs: David West 10; Asts: Paul George 6	Pts: Carmelo Anthony 28; Rebs: Tyson Chandler 8 Asts: Raymond Felton 4
Indiana leads series, 3–2

Madison Square Garden, New York City
Attendance: 19,033
Referees: Scott Foster, John Goble, Bill Kennedy

ESPN

May 18
8:00 pm

Boxscore

New York Knicks 99, Indiana Pacers 106
Scoring by quarter: 27–29, 20–26, 34–26, 18–25
Pts: Carmelo Anthony 39; Rebs: J. R. Smith 10; Asts: Kidd, Prigioni 6 each	Pts: Lance Stephenson 25; Rebs: Roy Hibbert 12; Asts: George, West, Hill 4 each
Indiana wins series, 4–2

Bankers Life Fieldhouse, Indianapolis
Attendance: 18,165
Referees: Ed Malloy, Ken Mauer, Tom Washington

- Game 6 is Jason Kidd's final NBA game. Additionally, it was the Knicks final playoff game until 2021.
- This marked the last playoff series between New York & Indiana until 2024.

Regular-season series

Tied 2–2 in the regular-season series

November 18, 2012

Recap

Indiana Pacers 76, New York Knicks 88

Madison Square Garden, New York City

January 10, 2013

Recap

New York Knicks 76, Indiana Pacers 81

Bankers Life Fieldhouse, Indianapolis

February 20, 2013

Recap

New York Knicks 91, Indiana Pacers 125

Bankers Life Fieldhouse, Indianapolis

April 14, 2013

Recap

Indiana Pacers 80, New York Knicks 90

Madison Square Garden, New York City

This was the seventh playoff meeting between these two teams, with each team winning three series apiece.

Previous playoff series
Tied 3–3 in all-time playoff series

1993

Indiana Pacers 1, New York Knicks 3

1993 Eastern Conference First Round

1994

Indiana Pacers 3, New York Knicks 4

1994 Eastern Conference Finals

1995

Indiana Pacers 4, New York Knicks 3

1995 Eastern Conference Semifinals

1998

Indiana Pacers 4, New York Knicks 1

1998 Eastern Conference Semifinals

1999

Indiana Pacers 2, New York Knicks 4

1999 Eastern Conference Finals

2000

Indiana Pacers 4, New York Knicks 2

2000 Eastern Conference Finals

=== Western Conference semifinals ===
==== (1) Oklahoma City Thunder vs. (5) Memphis Grizzlies ====
ABC

May 5
1:00 pm

Boxscore

Memphis Grizzlies 91, Oklahoma City Thunder 93
Scoring by quarter: 16–14, 30–33, 27–17, 18–29
Pts: Marc Gasol 20; Rebs: Zach Randolph 10; Asts: three players 3 each	Pts: Kevin Durant 35; Rebs: Kevin Durant 15; Asts: Kevin Durant 6
Oklahoma City leads series, 1–0

Chesapeake Energy Arena, Oklahoma City, Oklahoma
Attendance: 18,203
Referees: Scott Foster, John Goble, Bill Kennedy

TNT

May 7
9:30 pm

Boxscore

Memphis Grizzlies 99, Oklahoma City Thunder 93
Scoring by quarter: 23–21, 31–30, 15–23, 30–19
Pts: Mike Conley Jr. 26; Rebs: Mike Conley Jr. 10; Asts: Mike Conley Jr. 9	Pts: Kevin Durant 36; Rebs: Kevin Durant 11; Asts: Kevin Durant 9
Series tied, 1–1

Chesapeake Energy Arena, Oklahoma City, Oklahoma
Attendance: 18,203
Referees: Monty McCutchen, Ron Garretson, Gary Zielinski

ESPN

May 11
5:00 pm

Boxscore

Oklahoma City Thunder 81, Memphis Grizzlies 87
Scoring by quarter: 18–22, 27–22, 15–22, 21–21
Pts: Kevin Durant 25; Rebs: Kevin Durant 11; Asts: Kevin Durant 5	Pts: Marc Gasol 20; Rebs: Zach Randolph 10; Asts: Mike Conley Jr. 6
Memphis leads series, 2–1

FedExForum, Memphis, Tennessee
Attendance: 18,119
Referees: Ken Mauer, Ed Malloy, Tom Washington

TNT

May 13
9:30 pm

Boxscore

Oklahoma City Thunder 97, Memphis Grizzlies 103 (OT)
Scoring by quarter: 29–18, 27–30, 20–28, 18–18, Overtime: 3–9
Pts: Kevin Durant 27; Rebs: Serge Ibaka 14; Asts: Reggie Jackson 8	Pts: Mike Conley Jr. 24; Rebs: Zach Randolph 12; Asts: Conley, Prince 5 each
Memphis leads series, 3–1

FedExForum, Memphis, Tennessee
Attendance: 18,119
Referees: Joe Crawford, James Capers, Bennett Salvatore

TNT

May 15
9:30 pm

Boxscore

Memphis Grizzlies 88, Oklahoma City Thunder 84
Scoring by quarter: 18–23, 32–15, 14–24, 24–22
Pts: Zach Randolph 28; Rebs: Zach Randolph 14; Asts: Mike Conley Jr. 11	Pts: Kevin Durant 21; Rebs: Reggie Jackson 9 Asts: Kevin Durant 6
Memphis wins series, 4–1

Chesapeake Energy Arena, Oklahoma City, Oklahoma
Attendance: 18,203
Referees: Danny Crawford, Marc Davis, Jason Phillips

Regular-season series

Memphis won 2–1 in the regular-season series

November 14, 2012

Recap

Memphis Grizzlies 107, Oklahoma City Thunder 97

Chesapeake Energy Arena, Oklahoma City, Oklahoma

January 31, 2013

Recap

Memphis Grizzlies 89, Oklahoma City Thunder 106

Chesapeake Energy Arena, Oklahoma City, Oklahoma

March 20, 2013

Recap

Oklahoma City Thunder 89, Memphis Grizzlies 90 (OT)

FedExForum, Memphis, Tennessee

This was the second playoff meeting between these two teams, with the Thunder winning the first meeting.

Previous playoff series
Oklahoma City leads 1–0 in all-time playoff series

2011

Memphis Grizzlies 3, Oklahoma City Thunder 4

2011 Western Conference Semifinals

==== (2) San Antonio Spurs vs. (6) Golden State Warriors ====
TNT

May 6
9:30 pm

Boxscore

Golden State Warriors 127, San Antonio Spurs 129 (2OT)
Scoring by quarter: 28–25, 25–24, 39–31, 14–26, Overtime: 9–9, 12–14
Pts: Stephen Curry 44; Rebs: Andrew Bogut 15; Asts: Stephen Curry 11	Pts: Tony Parker 28; Rebs: Tim Duncan 11; Asts: Manu Ginóbili 11
San Antonio leads series, 1–0

AT&T Center, San Antonio
Attendance: 18,581
Referees: Mike Callahan, Tony Brothers, Zach Zarba

Golden State led by 16 points with four minutes to go, but they would be hindered by missing eight of their last nine shots while the Spurs roared back to force overtime. The Spurs would come back without Tim Duncan, who had been bothered by a stomach virus and had to be in the locker room for the final 4:31 of regulation. San Antonio finally tied the game on a Danny Green 3-pointer with 20 seconds left. Stephen Curry (who scored 22 points in the 3rd quarter) would have a shot to win the game at the buzzer, but he missed a tightly contested 15-footer. Manu Ginobili had a shot to potentially win the game at the end of the 1st overtime, but it was off the mark. With 44 seconds on the game clock in double overtime, Ginobili missed a three-pointer that would have given the Spurs a six-point lead. Curry then made a two-point shot twelve seconds later to narrow the score to one. A missed layup by Tony Parker gave the Warriors the ball back; with three seconds to go, Kent Bazemore gave the Warriors the lead on a layup. However, Ginobili would shoot a three-pointer to give the Spurs the lead with one second remaining on the clock, and Jarrett Jack's running jumper shot missed at the buzzer to deliver a Spurs victory.

TNT

May 8
9:30 pm

Boxscore

Golden State Warriors 100, San Antonio Spurs 91
Scoring by quarter: 28–23, 34–20, 21–29, 17–19
Pts: Klay Thompson 34; Rebs: Klay Thompson 14; Asts: Draymond Green 5	Pts: Tim Duncan 23; Rebs: Kawhi Leonard 12; Asts: Manu Ginóbili 4
Series tied, 1–1

AT&T Center, San Antonio
Attendance: 18,581
Referees: Danny Crawford, James Capers, Jason Phillips

ESPN

May 10
10:30 pm

Boxscore

San Antonio Spurs 102, Golden State Warriors 92
Scoring by quarter: 32–23, 25–25, 22–21, 23–23
Pts: Tony Parker 32; Rebs: Tim Duncan 10; Asts: Tony Parker 5	Pts: Klay Thompson 17; Rebs: Andrew Bogut 12; Asts: Stephen Curry 8
San Antonio leads series, 2–1

Oracle Arena, Oakland, California
Attendance: 19,596
Referees: Monty McCutchen, Rodney Mott, Bill Spooner

ABC

May 12
3:30 pm

Boxscore

San Antonio Spurs 87, Golden State Warriors 97 (OT)
Scoring by quarter: 26–19, 19–18, 17–23, 22–24, Overtime: 3–13
Pts: Manu Ginóbili 21; Rebs: Tim Duncan 15; Asts: four players 3 each	Pts: Harrison Barnes 26; Rebs: Andrew Bogut 18; Asts: three players 4 each
Series tied, 2–2

Oracle Arena, Oakland, California
Attendance: 19,596
Referees: Scott Foster, John Goble, Bill Kennedy

TNT

May 14
9:30 pm

Boxscore

Golden State Warriors 91, San Antonio Spurs 109
Scoring by quarter: 28–37, 23–17, 21–29, 19–26
Pts: Harrison Barnes 25; Rebs: Harrison Barnes 7 Asts: Stephen Curry 8	Pts: Tony Parker 25; Rebs: Tim Duncan 11; Asts: Tony Parker 10
San Antonio leads series, 3–2

AT&T Center, San Antonio
Attendance: 18,581
Referees: Ken Mauer, Ed Malloy, Tom Washington

ESPN

May 16
10:30 pm

Boxscore

San Antonio Spurs 94, Golden State Warriors 82
Scoring by quarter: 21–19, 26–21, 19–19, 28–23
Pts: Tim Duncan 19; Rebs: Kawhi Leonard 10; Asts: Manu Ginóbili 11	Pts: Stephen Curry 22; Rebs: Ezeli, Bogut 7 each Asts: Stephen Curry 6
San Antonio wins series, 4–2

Oracle Arena, Oakland, California
Attendance: 19,596
Referees: Joe Crawford, Sean Corbin, Derrick Stafford

Regular-season series

Tied 2–2 in the regular-season series

January 18, 2013

Recap

Golden State Warriors 88, San Antonio Spurs 95

AT&T Center, San Antonio

February 22, 2013

Recap

San Antonio Spurs 101, Golden State Warriors 107 (OT)

Oracle Arena, Oakland, California

March 20, 2013

Recap

Golden State Warriors 93, San Antonio Spurs 104

AT&T Center, San Antonio

April 15, 2013

Recap

San Antonio Spurs 106, Golden State Warriors 116

Oracle Arena, Oakland, California

This was the second playoff meeting between these two teams, with the Warriors winning the first meeting.

Previous playoff series
Golden State leads 1–0 in all-time playoff series

1991

Golden State Warriors 3, San Antonio Spurs 1

1991 Western Conference First Round

- This is the most recent playoff series between the Spurs & Warriors until 2017.
- This was most recent semifinals series Golden State had lost up until 2023.

== Conference finals ==
=== Eastern Conference finals ===
==== (1) Miami Heat vs. (3) Indiana Pacers ====
TNT

May 22
8:30 pm

Boxscore

Indiana Pacers 102, Miami Heat 103 (OT)
Scoring by quarter: 21–22, 21–15, 23–27, 27–28, Overtime: 10–11
Pts: Paul George 27; Rebs: Lance Stephenson 12; Asts: George Hill 7	Pts: LeBron James 30; Rebs: LeBron James 10; Asts: LeBron James 10
Miami leads series, 1–0

American Airlines Arena, Miami
Attendance: 19,679
Referees: Monty McCutchen, Tony Brothers, Jason Phillips

- Paul George hit the game-tying 3 with 0.7 left to send the game into OT, and then in OT, LeBron James hit the game winning layup at the buzzer to seal the Game 1 victory in Miami. He also had 30 points, and added 10 rebounds, 10 assists (his ninth career playoff triple double, tying him with Wilt Chamberlain for fourth all-time), and three blocked shots—the first such stat line in a playoff game since Ralph Sampson in Game 5 of the 1986 Western Conference Semifinals.

TNT

May 24
8:30 pm

Boxscore

Indiana Pacers 97, Miami Heat 93
Scoring by quarter: 28–22, 25–25, 23–27, 21–19
Pts: Roy Hibbert 29; Rebs: Roy Hibbert 10; Asts: Paul George 6	Pts: LeBron James 36; Rebs: LeBron James 8 Asts: Chalmers, Wade 5 each
Series tied, 1–1

American Airlines Arena, Miami
Attendance: 20,022
Referees: Scott Foster, Bill Kennedy, Tom Washington

TNT

May 26
8:30 pm

Boxscore

Miami Heat 114, Indiana Pacers 96
Scoring by quarter: 34–30, 36–26, 21–20, 23–20
Pts: LeBron James 22; Rebs: Chris Andersen 9 Asts: Dwyane Wade 8	Pts: David West 21; Rebs: Roy Hibbert 17; Asts: Paul George 8
Miami leads series, 2–1

Bankers Life Fieldhouse, Indianapolis
Attendance: 18,165
Referees: Ken Mauer, Mike Callahan, Ed Malloy

TNT

May 28
8:30 pm

Boxscore

Miami Heat 92, Indiana Pacers 99
Scoring by quarter: 22–26, 25–22, 23–29, 22–22
Pts: LeBron James 24; Rebs: Ray Allen 7 Asts: Dwyane Wade 6	Pts: Roy Hibbert 23; Rebs: West, Hibbert 12 each Asts: George Hill 6
Series tied, 2–2

Bankers Life Fieldhouse, Indianapolis
Attendance: 18,165
Referees: Joe Crawford, Rodney Mott, Derrick Stafford

TNT

May 30
8:30 pm

Boxscore

Indiana Pacers 79, Miami Heat 90
Scoring by quarter: 23–19, 21–21, 13–30, 22–20
Pts: Paul George 27; Rebs: Paul George 11; Asts: Paul George 5	Pts: LeBron James 30; Rebs: LeBron James 8 Asts: Chalmers, James 6 each
Miami leads series, 3–2

American Airlines Arena, Miami
Attendance: 19,913
Referees: Danny Crawford, James Capers, Marc Davis

TNT

June 1
8:30 pm

Boxscore

Miami Heat 77, Indiana Pacers 91
Scoring by quarter: 23–21, 17–18, 15–29, 22–23
Pts: LeBron James 29; Rebs: Joel Anthony 8 Asts: LeBron James 6	Pts: Paul George 28; Rebs: David West 14; Asts: George Hill 6
Series tied, 3–3

Bankers Life Fieldhouse, Indianapolis
Attendance: 18,165
Referees: Monty McCutchen, Tony Brothers, Jason Phillips

TNT

June 3
8:30 pm

Boxscore

Indiana Pacers 76, Miami Heat 99
Scoring by quarter: 21–19, 16–33, 18–24, 21–23
Pts: Roy Hibbert 18; Rebs: Roy Hibbert 8 Asts: Lance Stephenson 5	Pts: LeBron James 32; Rebs: Dwyane Wade 9 Asts: Cole, James 4 each
Miami wins series, 4–3

American Airlines Arena, Miami
Attendance: 20,025
Referees: Scott Foster, Mike Callahan, Ken Mauer

Regular-season series

Indiana won 2–1 in the regular-season series

January 8, 2013

Recap

Miami Heat 77, Indiana Pacers 87

Bankers Life Fieldhouse, Indianapolis

February 1, 2013

Recap

Miami Heat 89, Indiana Pacers 102

Bankers Life Fieldhouse, Indianapolis

March 10, 2013

Recap

Indiana Pacers 91, Miami Heat 105

American Airlines Arena, Miami

This was the third playoff meeting between these two teams, with each team winning one series apiece.

Previous playoff series
Tied 1–1 in all-time playoff series

2004

Indiana Pacers 4, Miami Heat 2

2004 Eastern Conference Semifinals

2012

Indiana Pacers 2, Miami Heat 4

2012 Eastern Conference Semifinals

=== Western Conference finals ===
==== (2) San Antonio Spurs vs. (5) Memphis Grizzlies ====
ABC

May 19
3:30 pm

Boxscore

Memphis Grizzlies 83, San Antonio Spurs 105
Scoring by quarter: 14–31, 23–20, 20–22, 26–32
Pts: Quincy Pondexter 17; Rebs: Randolph, Gasol 7 each Asts: Mike Conley Jr. 8	Pts: Tony Parker 20; Rebs: Tim Duncan 10; Asts: Tony Parker 9
San Antonio leads series, 1–0

AT&T Center, San Antonio
Attendance: 18,581
Referees: Danny Crawford, James Capers, Marc Davis

ESPN

May 21
9:00 pm

Boxscore

Memphis Grizzlies 89, San Antonio Spurs 93 (OT)
Scoring by quarter: 13–15, 18–31, 33–30, 21–9, Overtime: 4–8
Pts: Bayless, Conley 18 each Rebs: Zach Randolph 18; Asts: Conley, Gasol 4 each	Pts: Tim Duncan 17; Rebs: Duncan, Leonard 9 each Asts: Tony Parker 18
San Antonio leads series, 2–0

AT&T Center, San Antonio
Attendance: 18,581
Referees: Scott Foster, Bill Kennedy, Bill Spooner

ESPN

May 25
9:00 pm

Boxscore

San Antonio Spurs 104, Memphis Grizzlies 93 (OT)
Scoring by quarter: 13–29, 27–15, 24–21, 22–21, Overtime: 18–7
Pts: Tony Parker 26; Rebs: Kawhi Leonard 11; Asts: Duncan, Parker, Ginóbili 5 each	Pts: Mike Conley Jr. 20; Rebs: Zach Randolph 15; Asts: Marc Gasol 5
San Antonio leads series, 3–0

FedExForum, Memphis, Tennessee
Attendance: 18,119
Referees: Joe Crawford, Ron Garretson, Derrick Stafford

ESPN

May 27
9:00 pm

Boxscore

San Antonio Spurs 93, Memphis Grizzlies 86
Scoring by quarter: 24–14, 20–24, 28–28, 21–20
Pts: Tony Parker 37; Rebs: Tim Duncan 8 Asts: Ginóbili, Parker 6 each	Pts: Quincy Pondexter 22; Rebs: Allen, Randolph 8 each Asts: Mike Conley Jr. 7
San Antonio wins series, 4–0

FedExForum, Memphis, Tennessee
Attendance: 18,119
Referees: Monty McCutchen, Tony Brothers, Zach Zarba

- This was the first sweep of any NBA conference finals series since 2003, when the New Jersey Nets swept the Detroit Pistons.
- This is the most recent playoff series between the Spurs & Grizzlies until 2016.
- As of 2026, this remains the only Conference Finals appearance for the Memphis Grizzlies.

Regular-season series

Tied 2–2 in the regular-season series

December 1, 2012

Recap

Memphis Grizzlies 95, San Antonio Spurs 99 (OT)

AT&T Center, San Antonio

January 11, 2013

Recap

San Antonio Spurs 98, Memphis Grizzlies 101 (OT)

FedExForum, Memphis, Tennessee

January 16, 2013

Recap

Memphis Grizzlies 82, San Antonio Spurs 103

AT&T Center, San Antonio

April 1, 2013

Recap

San Antonio Spurs 90, Memphis Grizzlies 92

FedExForum, Memphis, Tennessee

This was the third playoff meeting between these two teams, with each team winning one series apiece.

Previous playoff series
Tied 1–1 in all-time playoff series

2004

Memphis Grizzlies 0, San Antonio Spurs 4

2004 Western Conference First Round

2011

Memphis Grizzlies 4, San Antonio Spurs 2

2011 Western Conference First Round

== NBA Finals: (E1) Miami Heat vs. (W2) San Antonio Spurs ==
ABC

June 6
9:00 pm

Boxscore

San Antonio Spurs 92, Miami Heat 88
Scoring by quarter: 23–24, 26–28, 20–20, 23–16
Pts: Tony Parker 21; Rebs: Tim Duncan 14; Asts: Tony Parker 6	Pts: LeBron James 18; Rebs: LeBron James 18; Asts: LeBron James 10
San Antonio leads series, 1–0

American Airlines Arena, Miami
Attendance: 19,775
Referees: Monty McCutchen, Tony Brothers, Jason Phillips

ABC

June 9
8:00 pm

Boxscore

San Antonio Spurs 84, Miami Heat 103
Scoring by quarter: 22–22, 23–28, 20–25, 19–28
Pts: Danny Green 17; Rebs: Kawhi Leonard 14; Asts: Tony Parker 5	Pts: Mario Chalmers 19; Rebs: Chris Bosh 10; Asts: LeBron James 7
Series tied, 1–1

American Airlines Arena, Miami
Attendance: 19,900
Referees: Joe Crawford, Ed Malloy, Ken Mauer

ABC

June 11
9:00 pm

Boxscore

Miami Heat 77, San Antonio Spurs 113
Scoring by quarter: 20–24, 24–26, 19–28, 14–35
Pts: Dwyane Wade 16; Rebs: LeBron James 11; Asts: James, Wade 5 each	Pts: Danny Green 27; Rebs: Tim Duncan 14; Asts: Tony Parker 8
San Antonio leads series, 2–1

AT&T Center, San Antonio
Attendance: 18,581
Referees: Danny Crawford, James Capers, Marc Davis

ABC

June 13
9:00 pm

Boxscore

Miami Heat 109, San Antonio Spurs 93
Scoring by quarter: 29–26, 20–23, 32–27, 28–17
Pts: LeBron James 33; Rebs: Chris Bosh 13; Asts: Mario Chalmers 9	Pts: Tim Duncan 20; Rebs: Kawhi Leonard 7 Asts: Tony Parker 9
Series tied, 2–2

AT&T Center, San Antonio
Attendance: 18,581
Referees: Scott Foster, Mike Callahan, Bill Kennedy

ABC

June 16
8:00 pm

Boxscore

Miami Heat 104, San Antonio Spurs 114
Scoring by quarter: 19–32, 33–29, 23–26, 29–27
Pts: James, Wade, 25 each Rebs: James, Bosh, 6 each Asts: Dwyane Wade 10	Pts: Tony Parker 26; Rebs: Tim Duncan 12; Asts: Manu Ginóbili 10
San Antonio leads series, 3–2

AT&T Center, San Antonio
Attendance: 18,581
Referees: Monty McCutchen, Tony Brothers, Ed Malloy

ABC

June 18
9:00 pm

Boxscore

San Antonio Spurs 100, Miami Heat 103 (OT)
Scoring by quarter: 25–27, 25–17, 25–21, 20–30, Overtime: 5–8
Pts: Tim Duncan 30; Rebs: Tim Duncan 17; Asts: Tony Parker 8	Pts: LeBron James 32; Rebs: Chris Bosh 11; Asts: LeBron James 11
Series tied, 3–3

American Airlines Arena, Miami
Attendance: 19,900
Referees: Joe Crawford, Mike Callahan, Ken Mauer

ABC

June 20
9:00 pm

Boxscore

San Antonio Spurs 88, Miami Heat 95
Scoring by quarter: 16–18, 28–28, 27–26, 17–23
Pts: Tim Duncan 24; Rebs: Kawhi Leonard 16; Asts: Manu Ginóbili 5	Pts: LeBron James 37; Rebs: LeBron James 12; Asts: Allen, James 4 each
Miami wins series, 4–3

American Airlines Arena, Miami
Attendance: 19,900
Referees: Danny Crawford, Scott Foster, Monty McCutchen

- Game 3 is Tracy McGrady's final NBA game.
- In Game 6, Ray Allen hit the game-tying corner 3 with 5.2 left to force OT.

Regular-season series

Miami won 2–0 in the regular-season series:

November 29, 2012

Recap

San Antonio Spurs 100, Miami Heat 105

American Airlines Arena, Miami

March 31, 2013

Recap

Miami Heat 88, San Antonio Spurs 86

AT&T Center, San Antonio

This was the first playoff meeting between the Heat and the Spurs.

== Statistical leaders ==
Category	High			Average			
Category	Player	Team	Total	Player	Team	Avg.	Games played
Points	Stephen Curry; Kevin Durant	Golden State Warriors; Oklahoma City Thunder	44 (2OT); 41	Kevin Durant	Oklahoma City Thunder	30.8	11
Rebounds	Andrew Bogut	Golden State Warriors	21	Kevin Garnett	Boston Celtics	13.7	6
Assists	Tony Parker; Stephen Curry; Mike Conley Jr.	San Antonio Spurs; Golden State Warriors; Memphis Grizzlies	18 (OT); 13; 13	Deron Williams	Brooklyn Nets	8.4	7
Steals	Dwyane Wade	Miami Heat	6	Monta Ellis	Milwaukee Bucks	2.5	4
Blocks	Brook Lopez	Brooklyn Nets	7	Brook Lopez; Serge Ibaka	Brooklyn Nets; Oklahoma City Thunder	3	7; 11

== NBA Records ==
The following records were set or tied during the playoffs:

- Overtime in Postseason: The Heat's 103–100 overtime win vs. San Antonio on June 18, 2013, improved their all-time postseason overtime record to 8–1 (.889). Their .889 postseason winning percentage is the best among teams with at least three overtime games played and the second-highest among all teams.
- Double-Digit wins in Postseason: The Heat's 16-point, 109–93, win in Game Four of the NBA Finals on June 13, 2013, was Miami's 12th double-figure win in the 2013 postseason. The 12 double-digit wins are the most by any team during a single postseason in NBA history. (Spurs tied this record in the 2014 NBA playoffs and all 12 of those victories would also be by 15+ points) The previous record was 11, held by five different teams, each winning the NBA Championship that postseason.
- Highest Field Goal Made Percentage, post season: Chris Andersen shot 80.7 percent (46-of-57) from the field in the 2013 postseason. He has become the first player in NBA postseason history to take at least 35 shots and shoot better than 75 percent from the field.
- Consecutive Finals games over 30 points: LeBron James scored 32 points in Game Six of the NBA Finals on June 18, 2013, and then made 37 points in Game Seven on June 20, 2013. According to Elias Sports Bureau, he became the first player in NBA history to score consecutive 30-point games to help rally his team from a 3–2 series deficit to win an NBA title.
- Game 7 over 30 Points: LeBron James finished the 2013 postseason by recording his fourth-straight 20-point Game Seven by scoring 37 points vs. the Spurs in the NBA Finals. He had previously scored 32 points vs. the Pacers on June 3, 2013, 31 points vs. the Celtics on June 9, 2012, and 45 points vs. the Celtics on May 18, 2008. The Elias Sports Bureau reports he has tied the record of the only other player to score at least 30 points in four consecutive Game 7's, Elgin Baylor (33 on 3/26/60, 39 on 4/1/61, 41 on 4/18/62, 35 on 4/11/63 and 33 on 4/15/66).
- Highest scoring average in game sevens: LeBron James is averaging 34.4 points in Game 7's of the postseason during his career, currently the best average in NBA history.
- Most 3-point FG in Postseason: Ray Allen owns the record for most 3-point field goals in the postseason – 385.
- Most 4 point plays in a Finals game, 2: On June 16, 2013, Ray Allen converted two free throws after making three-point field goals, one at the 5:08 mark in the 2nd quarter, and the other with 8:37 left in the 4th quarter. There had previously been only 12 four point plays in the NBA Finals history.
- Team Leader in Points, Rebounds, and Assists: LeBron James' 18 points, 18 rebounds and 10 assists vs. San Antonio on June 6, 2013, was the 28th time he has led his team outright (no ties) in each of those categories during the playoffs, the most in NBA postseason history. In addition, he has been the outright game-high leader (no ties) in each of those categories eight times, also the most in NBA postseason history. His eight such games are more than the combined total of the next three players to achieve the feat.
- 25-10-8: LeBron James' 32 points, 10 rebounds and 11 assists vs. SA on June 18, 2013, marked his 15th postseason 25-point, 10-rebound, eight-assist game, the most in NBA postseason history. According to Elias, second on this list is Oscar Robertson with 10 such games.
- Most Three Pointers In A Final Series: On June 16, 2013, Danny Green converted 25 three-pointers through 5 games of the 2013 NBA Finals, breaking Ray Allen's record of 22 three-pointers that he had set in the 2008 Finals against the Los Angeles Lakers. He extended the record to 27 three-pointers, converting two three-pointers (one per game) on June 18 and June 20. However, the Heat won the series 4–3.
