= Tom Brennan (basketball, born 1930) =

American basketball player

Personal information
- Born: August 6, 1930 Brooklyn, New York, U.S.
- Died: February 11, 1990 (aged 59)
- Listed height: 6 ft 3 in (1.91 m)
- Listed weight: 195 lb (88 kg)

Career information
- College: Villanova (1949–1952)
- NBA draft: 1952: 5th round, 43rd overall pick
- Drafted by: Philadelphia Warriors
- Playing career: 1954–1956
- Position: Forward
- Number: 14

Career history
- 1954–1955: Philadelphia Warriors
- 1955–1956: Wilkes-Barre Barons

Career highlights
- EPBL champion (1956)
- Stats at NBA.com
- Stats at Basketball Reference

Thomas F. Brennan (August 6, 1930 – February 11, 1990) was an American basketball player. He played collegiately for the Villanova Wildcats. Brennan was selected by the Philadelphia Warriors in the 1952 NBA draft. He played for the Warriors (1954–55) in the NBA for 11 games.

== College career ==
Brennan played three seasons of college basketball at Villanova University from 1949 until 1952. In 1951, Brennan helped the Wildcats to a 25–7 record and played in the 1951 NCAA tournament, losing to NC State in the first round.

== Professional career ==
Brennan was drafted by the Philadelphia Warriors in the 1952 NBA draft. He made his NBA debut on November 20, 1954, against the Fort Wayne Pistons at Philadelphia Civic Center in Philadelphia, Brennan scored two points in the Warriors 99–82 win. Brennan would only play 11 games in the NBA and played his final game on December 26, 1954, also against the Pistons.

Brennan played for the Wilkes-Barre Barons of the Eastern Professional Basketball League (EPBL) during the 1955–56 season and won an EPBL championship in 1956.

== Career statistics ==
Legend
GP	Games played	GS	Games started	MPG	Minutes per game
FG%	Field goal percentage	3P%	3-point field goal percentage	FT%	Free throw percentage
RPG	Rebounds per game	APG	Assists per game	SPG	Steals per game
BPG	Blocks per game	PPG	Points per game	**Bold**	Career high

=== NBA ===
==== Regular season ====
Year	Team	GP	MPG	FG%	FT%	RPG	APG	PPG
1954–55	Philadelphia	11	4.7	.455	–	.5	.2	.9
