= John Stockton =

American basketball player (born 1962)

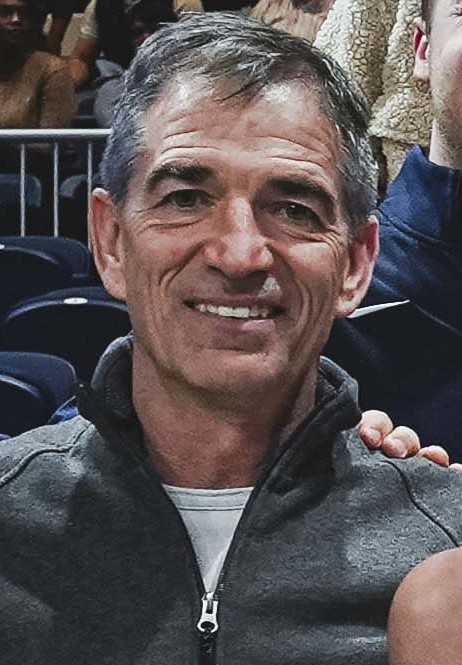
- Stockton in 2022

Personal information
- Born: March 26, 1962 (age 64) Spokane, Washington, U.S.
- Listed height: 6 ft 1 in (1.85 m)
- Listed weight: 175 lb (79 kg)

Career information
- High school: Gonzaga Prep (Spokane, Washington)
- College: Gonzaga (1980–1984)
- NBA draft: 1984: 1st round, 16th overall pick
- Drafted by: Utah Jazz
- Playing career: 1984–2003
- Position: Point guard
- Number: 12

Career history

Playing
- 1984–2003: Utah Jazz

Career highlights
- 10× NBA All-Star (1989–1997, 2000); NBA All-Star Game co-MVP (Note: along with Karl Malone) (1993); 2× All-NBA First Team (1994, 1995); 6× All-NBA Second Team (1988–1990, 1992, 1993, 1996); 3x All-NBA Third Team (1991, 1997, 1999); 5× NBA All-Defensive Second Team (1989, 1991, 1992, 1995, 1997); 9× NBA assists leader (1988–1996); 2× NBA steals leader (1989, 1992); NBA anniversary team (50th, 75th); No. 12 retired by Utah Jazz; WCAC Player of the Year (1984); 2× First-team All-WCAC (1983, 1984); No. 12 retired by Gonzaga Bulldogs

Career NBA statistics
- Points: 19,711 (13.1 ppg)
- Assists: 15,806 (10.5 apg)
- Steals: 3,265 (2.2 spg)
- Stats at NBA.com
- Stats at Basketball Reference
- Basketball Hall of Fame
- Collegiate Basketball Hall of Fame
Medals
Men's basketball
Representing the United States
Olympic Games
Gold medal – first place	1992 Barcelona	Team competition
Gold medal – first place	1996 Atlanta	Team competition
FIBA Americas Championship
Gold medal – first place	1992 Portland	Men's basketball

John Houston Stockton (born March 26, 1962) is an American former professional basketball player. Regarded as one of the greatest point guards of all time, he spent his entire NBA career (1984–2003) with the Utah Jazz. The team made the playoffs in each of his 19 seasons. In 1997 and again in 1998, Stockton and his longtime teammate Karl Malone led the Jazz to the NBA Finals; both times, the team was defeated in six games by the Chicago Bulls. Stockton is a ten-time NBA All-Star and holds the NBA records for most career assists and steals by wide margins.

In 1996, Stockton was named one of the 50 greatest players in NBA history. In 2009, he was inducted into the Naismith Memorial Basketball Hall of Fame as an individual, and again in 2010 as a member of the 1992 United States Olympic basketball team. In October 2021, Stockton was again honored as one of the league's greatest players of all time by being named to the NBA 75th Anniversary Team.

== Early years ==
Stockton was born and raised in Spokane, Washington to Clementine (née Frei) and Jack Stockton. He attended grade school at St. Aloysius and moved on to high school at Gonzaga Prep and graduated in 1980, after breaking the city record for points scored in a single basketball season.

== College career ==
After considering offers from Don Monson at Idaho and Mike Montgomery at Montana (both in the Big Sky Conference), Stockton decided to stay in Spokane and play college basketball for Dan Fitzgerald at Gonzaga University. He became the third generation in his family at GU; grandfather Houston Stockton was a well-known football player for the Bulldogs in the 1920s. Fitzgerald was also the athletic director; he stepped away from coaching for four years after Stockton's freshman year and promoted assistant Jay Hillock to head coach.

During his senior year for the Bulldogs in 1984, Stockton averaged 20.9 points per game shooting 57% from the field. The Zags posted a 17–11 record, their best in 17 years, and Stockton led the West Coast Athletic Conference in scoring, assists, and steals. For his performance, he was named WCAC Player of the Year, the first-ever Gonzaga player to earn the award.

He was one of 74 college players invited to the spring tryouts for the 1984 U.S. Olympic team coached by Bob Knight. Stockton made the initial cut in April to the final 20, but was one of four released in May (with Charles Barkley, Terry Porter, and Maurice Martin) in the penultimate cut to 16 players. Though not selected, the experience led him to meet his future teammate and friend, Karl Malone.

== Professional career ==
=== Utah Jazz (1984–2003) ===
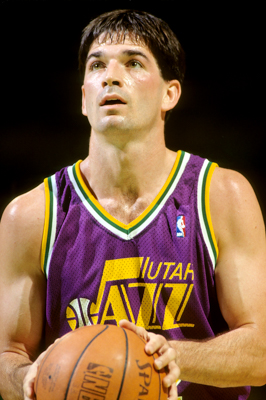
Stockton spent his entire NBA career with the Utah Jazz from 1984 to 2003.

In June 1984, Stockton was selected by the Utah Jazz in the first round of the 1984 NBA draft as the 16th overall pick. Though he was relatively unknown during his college career, his stock rose significantly in the months before the NBA draft. Nevertheless, the announcement of his selection to the thousands of Jazz fans gathered at the Salt Palace on draft day was met with a stunned silence. On November 10, 1984, Stockton had his highest scoring game as a rookie, with 19 points in only 19 minutes of playing time, during a loss against the Denver Nuggets.

Stockton became the starting point guard for the Jazz in the 1987–88 season. That season, despite eventually finishing tenth in MVP voting and being named to the All-NBA Second Team after averaging 14.7 points, 13.8 assists (best in the league), and 3 steals a game, Stockton was not selected to play in the 1988 NBA All-Star Game. In 1988–89, he played in his first All-Star Game; that season he also led the league in steals per game (while once again leading the NBA in assists per game, which he would do for nine consecutive seasons). Stockton also led the league in steals per game in 1991-92.

On January 15, 1991, Stockton scored 20 points and dished out a career-high and franchise-record 28 assists in a 124–102 home win against the San Antonio Spurs. On February 12, Stockton nearly recorded a triple-double after putting up 19 points, 11 assists, and 9 steals in a 113–92 win over the Houston Rockets.

In 1992, Stockton and the Jazz reached the Western Conference Finals for the first time; however, they were defeated by the Portland Trail Blazers in six games. Along with Malone, Stockton was named co-MVP of the All-Star Game in 1993 and the game was held in Salt Lake City.

During the 1994–95 season, Stockton achieved many milestones. On February 1, 1995, he passed Magic Johnson (who had 9,921 assists) as the NBA's all-time leader in assists as he dished out 16 assists in a 129–98 victory over the visiting Denver Nuggets. His 16 assists gave him 9,937 assists for his career at that time. Magic Johnson, in an interview, said to Stockton, "John, from one assist man to another, you are the greatest team leader I have ever played against." Seventeen days later, Stockton dished out 15 assists in a 108–98 victory over the Boston Celtics. His 15 assists gave him a career total of 10,008 assists, the first-ever player to have dished out 10,000 assists in his career. On March 25, Stockton became just the second player in NBA history to have recorded 2,000 steals after recording 6 steals in a 117–110 loss to the Dallas Mavericks. He was named to the All-NBA first team for the 1995-96 season, a feat which no white American player has accomplished since.

Stockton and the Jazz reached the Conference Finals again in 1994 and 1996, but lost to the Houston Rockets and the Seattle SuperSonics, respectively.

Utah set a franchise record and led the Western Conference with 64 wins in the 1996–97 season. The team again reached the Western Conference Finals. In Game Six of the Conference Finals, Stockton scored 25 points, dished out 13 assists, and made a buzzer-beating, game-winning three-point shot over the Rockets' Charles Barkley to send the Jazz to the first of two consecutive NBA Finals appearances. Stockton's game-winner became known as "The Shot". In Game 3 of the 1997 NBA Finals, Stockton recorded 17 points, 7 rebounds, and 12 assists in their first Finals' win in franchise history. The Jazz were defeated by the Michael Jordan-led Chicago Bulls in six games in the Finals.

Stockton missed the first 18 games of the 1997–98 season with a knee injury, but the Jazz returned to the NBA Finals and again faced the Bulls. In Game 6 of the 1998 NBA Finals, Stockton made a three-pointer with 41.9 seconds left to give the Jazz a lead, but Bulls guard Michael Jordan made two field goals to put his team ahead 87–86. Stockton missed a three-point attempt with 5.2 seconds left and said in a post-game interview that he felt confident the shot would go in. The Bulls again defeated the Jazz in six games.

The Jazz made the NBA playoffs every season during Stockton's 19-year NBA career.

=== Retirement ===
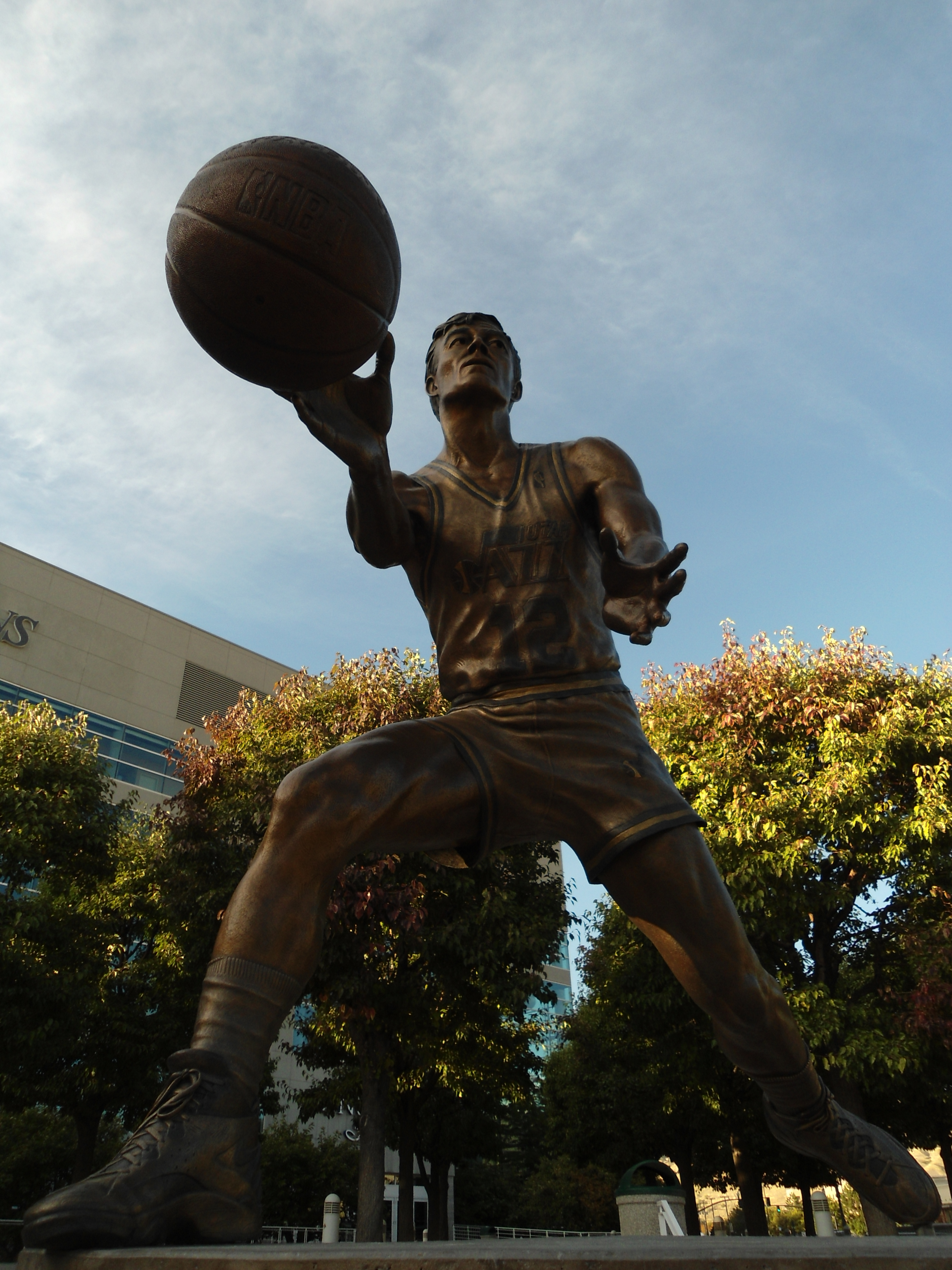
The statue of John Stockton

On May 2, 2003, Stockton announced his retirement with a released statement instead of the customary news conference. The Jazz later held a retirement ceremony for him, in which Salt Lake City renamed the street in front of the venue known as Delta Center, where the Jazz play, John Stockton Drive. Stockton would later declare that despite being still content with the game and how well he was playing, his growing family made him feel that "sitting in the hotel room waiting for games wasn't making up for what I was missing at home."

Stockton's number 12 jersey was retired by the Jazz during a game on November 22, 2004. A statue of Stockton can be seen in front of the Delta Center; an accompanying statue of Karl Malone was placed nearby on March 23, 2006. The Malone and Stockton statues stand on a bronze plaque commemorating their achievements together. Stockton was inducted into the Naismith Memorial Basketball Hall of Fame in 2009. Stockton was also inducted into the Hall of Fame along with the rest of the 1992 United States men's Olympic basketball team in 2010.

== Player profile ==
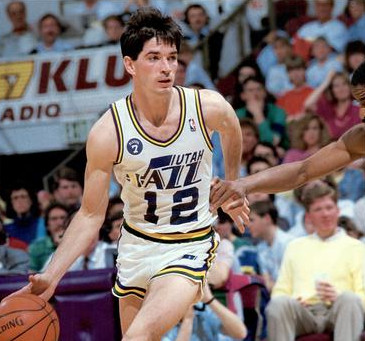
Stockton, circa 1988

Stockton was notable for his durability, missing only 22 games in his 19-season career and playing every game of 17 seasons. In his first 13 seasons, he missed only four games (all in the 1989–90 season). Stockton missed the first 18 games of the 1997–98 season due to an injured MCL in his left knee sustained in the preseason. That was the only major injury in his career, and he never missed another game after returning from that injury. Stockton earned the "old school" tag for his physical play; surveys of athletes and fans alike often judged him among the toughest players in the NBA, usually just behind teammate Karl Malone. Stockton's tenacity also earned him a reputation among some in the league as being a dirty player, as suggested by a poll Sports Illustrated conducted in 1997 where he was voted as the second dirtiest player in the league behind Dennis Rodman. He continued wearing "short shorts" long after other NBA players began wearing baggier shorts; as a result, the type of shorts Stockton wore became known as "Stocktons".

Stockton's career is also notable for its consistency and longevity. He remained a starting NBA player until his retirement at age 41. Stockton avoided most endorsements and stayed loyal to Utah despite being offered more money by other teams. In 1996, he agreed to a deal that made salary-cap space available so the team could improve, but in exchange, he insisted on guaranteed Delta Center ice time for his son's hockey team. Stockton was also known for his work ethic and his unselfishness.

For many years, Karl Malone and Stockton were the Jazz's one-two punch. The two played a record 1,412 regular season games together as teammates. Many of Stockton's assists resulted from passes to Malone. Stockton and Malone have been described as the greatest pick-and-roll combination of all time. ESPN has described Stockton and Malone as the two best players to never have won an NBA championship.

As of March 2026, Stockton holds a commanding lead for the NBA record for career assists with 15,806. He was the first player to reach the 10,000 through 15,000 career assist milestones. As of 2019, Stockton also held the record for assists-per-game average over one season (14.5 in 1990). As of 2016, he was one of three players to have logged more than 1,000 assists in one season, joining Kevin Porter (1,099 in 1979) and Isiah Thomas (1,123 in 1985) on that exclusive list. Stockton accomplished this feat seven times.

As of March 2026, Stockton holds the NBA record for career steals with 3,265 and stands 55th on the list of NBA career scoring leaders with 19,711 career points. Stockton averaged 13.1 points per game, had a 51.5% career shooting percentage, and made 38.4% of his three-point shots.

Stockton was selected to the All-NBA First Team twice, the All-NBA Second Team six times, the All-NBA Third Team three times, and the NBA All-Defensive Second Team five times. He was selected to 10 All-Star Games. He was named one of the 50 Greatest Players in NBA history in 1996. On May 11, 2006, ESPN.com named Stockton the fourth best point guard of all time. In October 2021, Stockton was again honored as one of the league's greatest players of all time by being named to the NBA 75th Anniversary Team. In 1999, Sports Illustrated named Stockton as the best athlete to come out of the state of Washington in the 20th century. In 2022, to commemorate the NBA's 75th Anniversary The Athletic ranked their top 75 players of all time, and named Stockton as the 25th greatest player in NBA history.

== Awards and achievements ==
NBA

- 10× NBA All-Star: 1989–1997, 2000
- NBA All-Star Game co-MVP: 1993
- 11x All-NBA Team selections:
  - 2× First Team: 1994, 1995
  - 6× Second Team: 1988–1990, 1992, 1993, 1996
  - 3x Third Team: 1991, 1997, 1999
- 5× NBA All-Defensive Second Team: 1989, 1991, 1992, 1995, 1997
- 9× NBA assists leader: 1988–1996
- 2× NBA steals leader: 1989, 1992
- 50 Greatest Players in NBA History (1996)
- NBA 75th Anniversary Team (2021)
- No. 12 retired by Utah Jazz

USA Basketball

- Olympics gold medalist: 1992, 1996
- FIBA Americas Championship: 1992

NCAA

- WCAC Player of the Year: 1984
- 2× First-team All-WCAC: 1983, 1984
- No. 12 retired by Gonzaga Bulldogs
- National Collegiate Basketball Hall of Fame: Class of 2017

=== NBA Regular Season Achievements ===
- Only player in NBA history to record multiple games with at least 25 assists made. (3)
- One of two players in NBA history to lead the league in steals and assists in the same season more than once. (2)
  - Chris Paul achieved this 3 times
- 1st place all-time in career assists with 15,806.
- 1st place all-time in career steals with 3,265.
- 1st place all-time for most seasons leading the league in assists for consecutive seasons with 9.

== National team career ==
Stockton, along with other NBA stars, played on the United States national team in the 1992 Olympics in Barcelona, Spain. The 1992 team was the first U.S. Olympic squad to feature NBA players. The team became known as the Dream Team; the Naismith Memorial Basketball Hall of Fame called it "the greatest collection of basketball talent on the planet". Stockton also played on the 1996 U.S. men's Olympic basketball team. Stockton won gold medals with both the 1992 and 1996 teams.

== Post-retirement activities ==
Following his retirement, Stockton moved back to his hometown Spokane. He started coaching youth teams, serving as "an assistant on seven or eight teams at once" in 2003. The Jazz also invited Stockton to train both Deron Williams and Trey Burke. Stockton also became involved in various businesses including construction projects.

In 2013, Stockton released an autobiography entitled Assisted. The book was written with the help of his junior high school coach, Kerry L. Pickett. Karl Malone wrote the foreword. Stockton was on the Jazz's long list of coaching candidates to replace Tyrone Corbin before the selection of Quin Snyder.

On October 28, 2015, Stockton joined Montana State University's women's basketball program as an assistant coach to replace Kellee Barney. Barney left the program to pursue a career in business, and Stockton had previously coached four of the players on the MSU women's team when they played for teams in Amateur Athletic Union leagues.

In 2021, Stockton appeared in a video series titled "V-Revealed, COVID Edition," raising doubt about the COVID-19 pandemic and warning against vaccines. Stockton said he had done a "significant amount of research" and determined, "This isn't a virus cheating us of these opportunities. It's the guys making decisions saying, 'No, no, we're too scared. We're going to shut everything down.'" He made the claim that "hundreds" of athletes had died due to receiving a COVID vaccine. In January 2022, Gonzaga suspended his season tickets because of his refusal to comply with the university's mask mandate.

In 2024, Stockton and Ken Ruettgers, a retired NFL tackle who played for the Green Bay Packers, founded Voices for Medical Freedom.

== Personal life ==
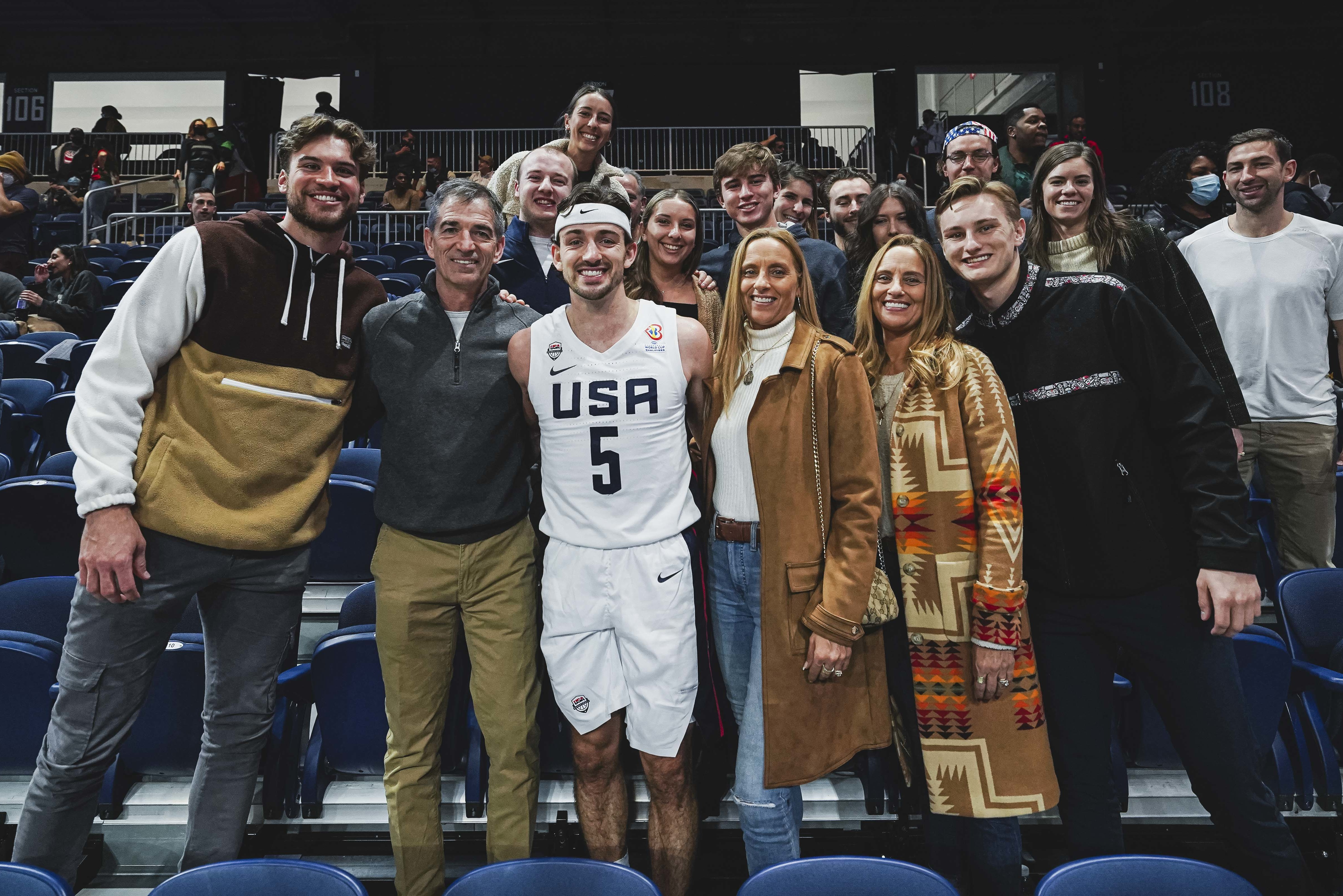
Stockton (second from left) with his family, including David Stockton, at Entertainment and Sports Arena in 2022

Hust Stockton, Stockton's grandfather (born John Houston Stockton) played professional football for the Frankford Yellow Jackets in the nascent National Football League in the 1920s; Stockton was a member of the Yellow Jackets' 1926 NFL Championship team.

Stockton and his wife, the former Nada Stepovich (the daughter of Matilda Stepovich and Mike Stepovich, the last territorial governor of Alaska) reside in Spokane. They have two daughters (Lindsay and Laura) and four sons (Houston, Michael, David, and Samuel). Stockton and his family are Catholics.

Houston Stockton played college football as a defensive back for the Montana Grizzlies. In 2011, Michael Stockton, who played basketball at Salt Lake City's Westminster College, signed with BG Karlsruhe in Germany's second basketball division. In 2017, Michael signed with BG Göttingen in Germany's first basketball division, the Basketball Bundesliga. David Stockton completed his college basketball career at Gonzaga in 2014 and, after playing for the Reno Bighorns in the NBA's Development League, played for the NBA's Sacramento Kings and Utah Jazz. Daughter Lindsay Stockton played basketball for Montana State University and daughter Laura Stockton played basketball at Gonzaga.

Laura signed her first professional contract to play for Herner TC in Germany in 2020. In 2022, she signed a contract with the TK Hannover Luchse ("Lynxes") in Lower Saxony, Germany, where she soon became a fan favorite thanks to her powerful, aggressive playing style. In that season, Laura Stockton and the Lynxes won the German Cup and reached the championship finals, gaining home advantage as top seeded team after the regular season. After forward and scoring leader Angel Rizor suffered a broken hand in game 1, they lost 0–3 against the new champions, the Keltern Stars.

Stockton has a brother and three nephews who have played college basketball. Steve Stockton, his brother, played for the University of Washington. Steve Stockton's oldest son Steve Stockton Jr. played at Whitworth College; another son, Shawn Stockton finished his college basketball career at the University of Montana in the 2011–12 season; and Steve's youngest son, Riley played for Seattle Pacific.

Stockton has appeared in television commercials for Foot Locker, State Farm Insurance, and Diet Pepsi.

== NBA career statistics ==
Legend
GP	Games played	GS	Games started	MPG	Minutes per game
FG%	Field goal percentage	3P%	3-point field goal percentage	FT%	Free throw percentage
RPG	Rebounds per game	APG	Assists per game	SPG	Steals per game
BPG	Blocks per game	PPG	Points per game	**Bold**	Career high
*	Led the league	‡	NBA record

=== Regular season ===
Year	Team	GP	GS	MPG	FG%	3P%	FT%	RPG	APG	SPG	BPG	PPG
1984–85	Utah	**82**	5	18.2	.471	.182	.736	1.3	5.1	1.3	.1	5.6
1985–86	Utah	**82**	38	23.6	.489	.133	.839	2.2	7.4	1.9	.1	7.7
1986–87	Utah	**82**	2	22.7	.499	.179	.782	1.8	8.2	2.2	.2	7.9
1987–88	Utah	**82**	79	34.7	**.574**	.358	.840	2.9	13.8*	3.0	.2	14.7
1988–89	Utah	**82**	**82**	**38.7**	.538	.242	**.863**	3.0	13.6*	**3.2***	.2	17.1
1989–90	Utah	78	78	37.4	.514	.416	.819	2.6	**14.5**‡	2.7	.2	**17.2**
1990–91	Utah	**82**	**82**	37.8	.507	.345	.836	2.9	14.2*	2.9	.2	**17.2**
1991–92	Utah	**82**	**82**	36.6	.482	.407	.842	**3.3**	13.7*	3.0*	**.3**	15.8
1992–93	Utah	**82**	**82**	34.9	.486	.385	.798	2.9	12.0*	2.4	**.3**	15.1
1993–94	Utah	**82**	**82**	36.2	.528	.322	.805	3.1	12.6*	2.4	**.3**	15.1
1994–95	Utah	**82***	**82***	35.0	.542	.449	.804	3.1	12.3*	2.4	**.3**	14.7
1995–96	Utah	**82**	**82***	35.5	.538	.422	.830	2.8	11.2*	1.7	.2	14.7
1996–97	Utah	**82**	**82***	35.3	.548	.422	.846	2.8	10.5	2.0	.2	14.4
1997–98	Utah	64	64	29.0	.528	.429	.827	2.6	8.5	1.4	.2	12.0
1998–99	Utah	50*	50*	28.2	.488	.320	.811	2.9	7.5	1.6	**.3**	11.1
1999–00	Utah	**82**	**82***	29.7	.501	.355	.860	2.6	8.6	1.7	.2	12.1
2000–01	Utah	**82**	**82***	29.1	.504	**.462**	.817	2.8	8.7	1.6	**.3**	11.5
2001–02	Utah	**82**	**82**	31.3	.517	.321	.857	3.2	8.2	1.9	**.3**	13.4
2002–03	Utah	**82**	**82***	27.7	.483	.363	.826	2.5	7.7	1.7	.2	10.8
Career		1,504	1,300	31.8	.515	.384	.826	2.7	10.5	2.2	.2	13.1
All-Star		10	5	19.7	.530	.333	.667	1.7	7.1	1.6	.1	8.1

=== Playoffs ===
Year	Team	GP	GS	MPG	FG%	3P%	FT%	RPG	APG	SPG	BPG	PPG
1985	Utah	10	0	18.6	.467	.000	.743	2.8	4.3	1.1	.2	6.8
1986	Utah	4	0	14.3	.529	**1.000**	.889	1.5	3.5	1.3	.0	6.8
1987	Utah	5	2	31.4	**.621**	.800	.729	2.2	8.0	3.0	.2	10.0
1988	Utah	11	11	43.5	.507	.286	.824	4.1	14.8	3.4	.3	19.5
1989	Utah	3	3	**46.3**	.508	.750	.905	3.3	13.7	**3.7**	**1.7**	**27.3**
1990	Utah	5	5	38.8	.420	.077	.800	3.2	**15.0**	1.2	.0	15.0
1991	Utah	9	9	41.4	.537	.407	.841	4.7	13.8	2.2	.2	18.2
1992	Utah	16	16	38.9	.423	.310	.833	2.9	13.6	2.1	.3	14.8
1993	Utah	5	5	38.6	.451	.385	.833	2.4	11.0	2.4	.0	13.2
1994	Utah	16	16	37.3	.456	.167	.810	3.3	9.8	1.7	.5	14.4
1995	Utah	5	5	38.6	.459	.400	.765	3.4	10.2	1.4	.2	17.8
1996	Utah	18	18	37.7	.446	.289	.814	3.2	10.8	1.6	.4	11.1
1997	Utah	**20**	**20**	37.0	.521	.380	.856	3.9	9.6	1.7	.3	16.1
1998	Utah	**20**	**20**	29.8	.494	.346	.718	3.0	7.8	1.6	.2	11.1
1999	Utah	11	11	32.0	.400	.333	.739	3.3	8.4	1.6	.1	11.1
2000	Utah	10	10	35.0	.461	.389	.767	3.0	10.3	1.3	.2	11.2
2001	Utah	5	5	37.2	.459	.000	.714	**5.6**	11.4	2.0	.6	9.8
2002	Utah	4	4	35.3	.450	.286	.923	4.0	10.0	2.8	.3	12.5
2003	Utah	5	5	29.8	.462	.000	**1.000**	3.2	5.2	1.6	.2	11.2
Career		182	165	35.2	.473	.326	.810	3.3	10.1	1.9	.3	13.4

== See also ==
- List of NBA career games played leaders
- List of NBA career assists leaders
- List of NBA career steals leaders
- List of NBA career turnovers leaders
- List of NBA career personal fouls leaders
- List of NBA career free throw scoring leaders
- List of NBA career minutes played leaders
- List of NBA career playoff assists leaders
- List of NBA career playoff steals leaders
- List of NBA career playoff turnovers leaders
- List of NBA career playoff games played leaders
- List of NBA single-game assists leaders
- List of NBA single-game steals leaders
- List of NBA single-season assists per game leaders
- List of NBA single-season steals per game leaders
- List of NBA seasons played leaders
- List of NBA players who have spent their entire career with one franchise
- List of second-generation NBA players
