= List of NBA career assists leaders =

This article provides two lists:

A list of National Basketball Association players by total career regular season assists recorded.

A progressive list of assist leaders showing how the record has increased through the years.

== Assist leaders ==
This is a list of the top 50 National Basketball Association players by total career regular season assists recorded.

^	Active NBA player
*	Inducted into the Naismith Memorial Basketball Hall of Fame
†	Not yet eligible for Hall of Fame consideration (Note: A player is not eligible for induction into the Naismith Memorial Basketball Hall of Fame until he has been fully retired for two calendar years.)

Statistics accurate as of November 18, 2026.

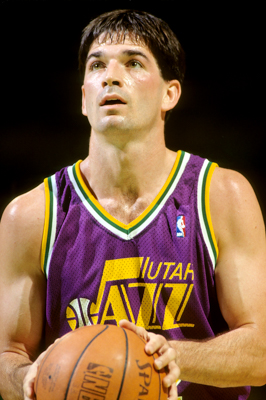
John Stockton has the most assists in NBA history and is also the all-time leader in steals.

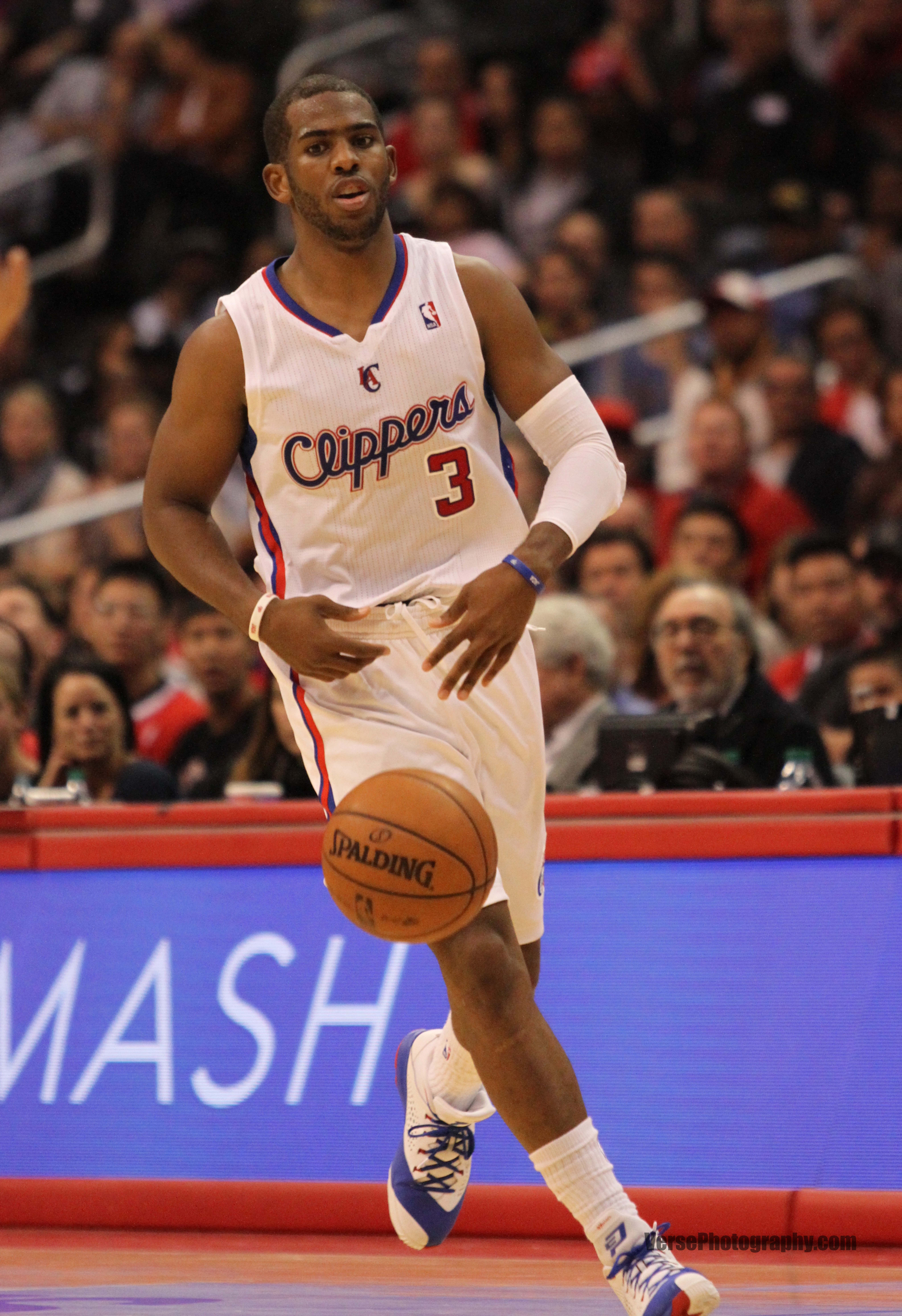
Chris Paul has the second-most assists and the second-most steals in NBA history, having led the NBA in assists per game during five separate seasons.

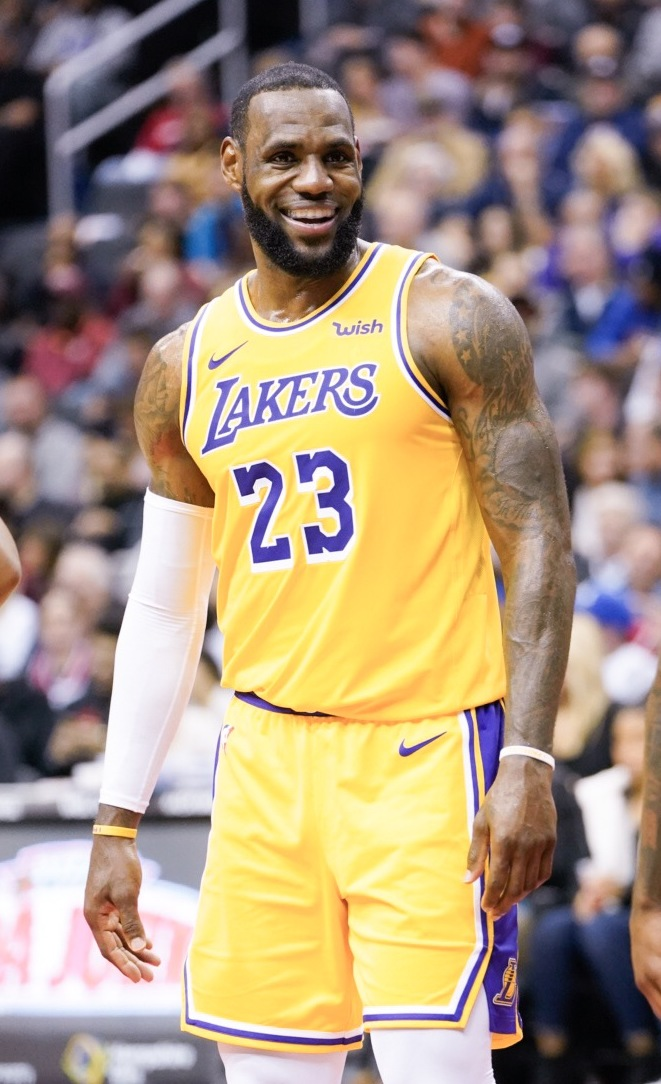
In addition to having the third-most assists in NBA history and the most assists among active NBA players, LeBron James is also the all-time leading scorer in NBA history.

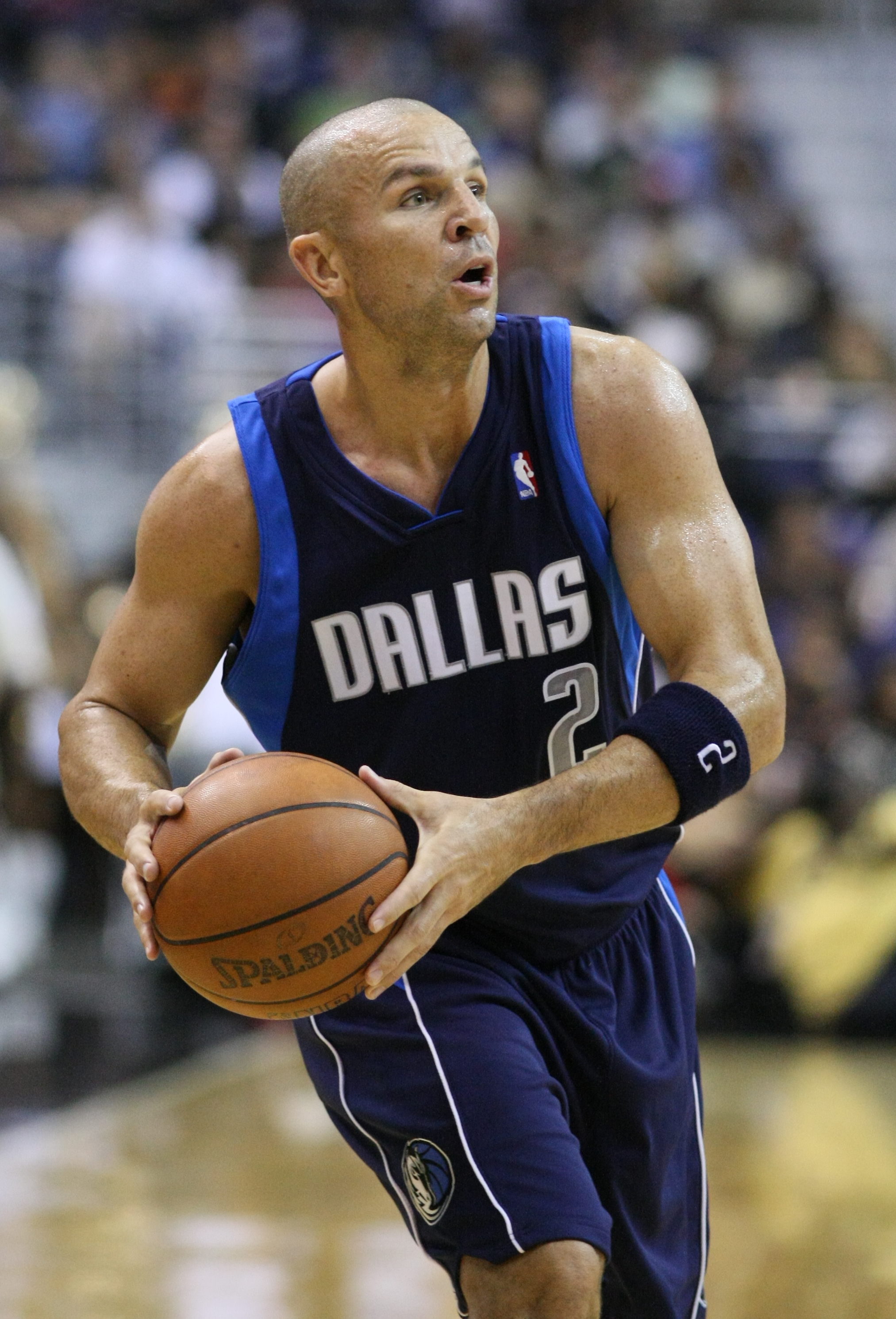
Jason Kidd has the fourth-most assists and the third-most steals in NBA history, having led the NBA in assists per game during five separate seasons.

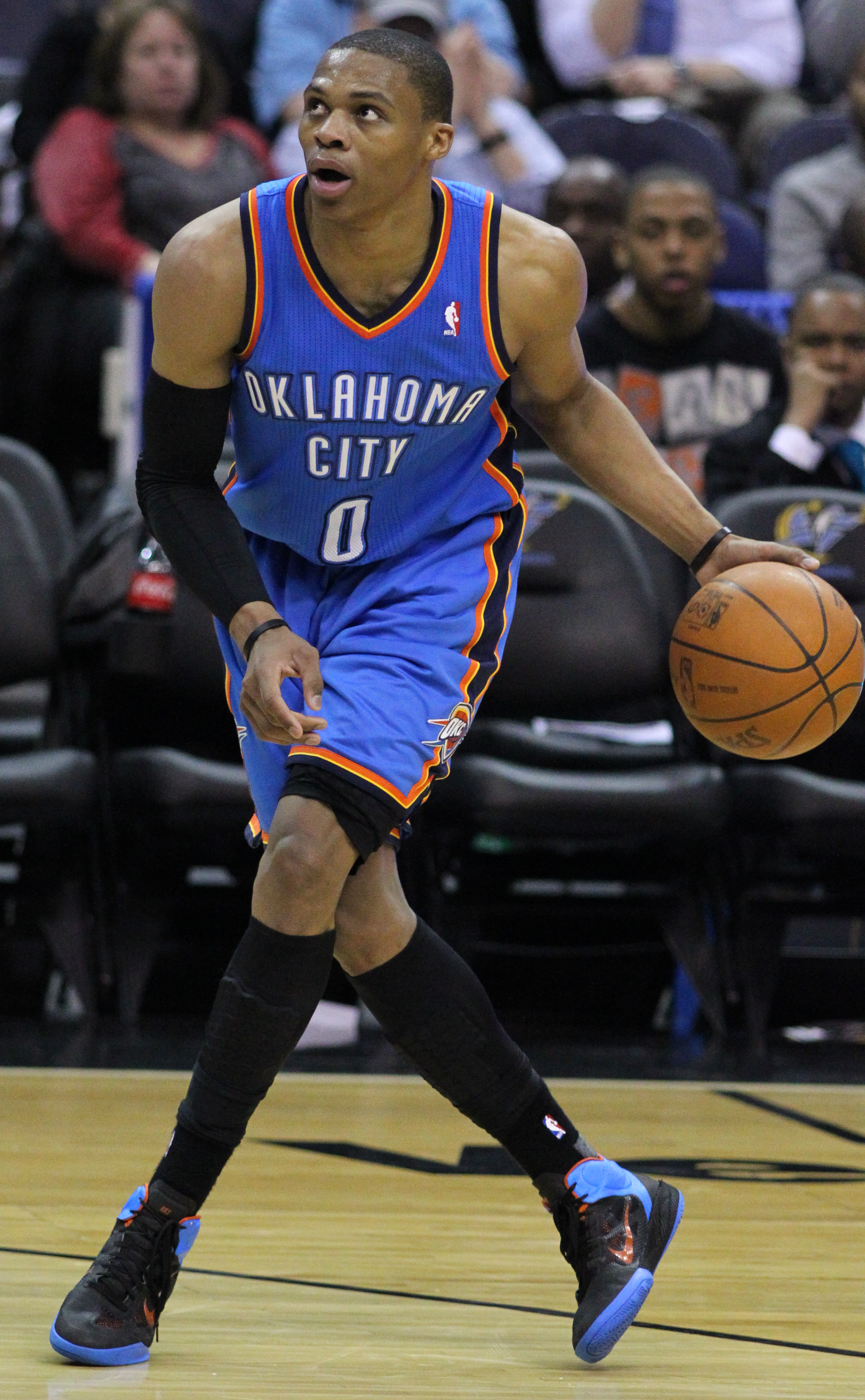
Russell Westbrook has the fifth-most assists in NBA history, and he is one of 2 players in NBA history to average a triple-double multiple times.

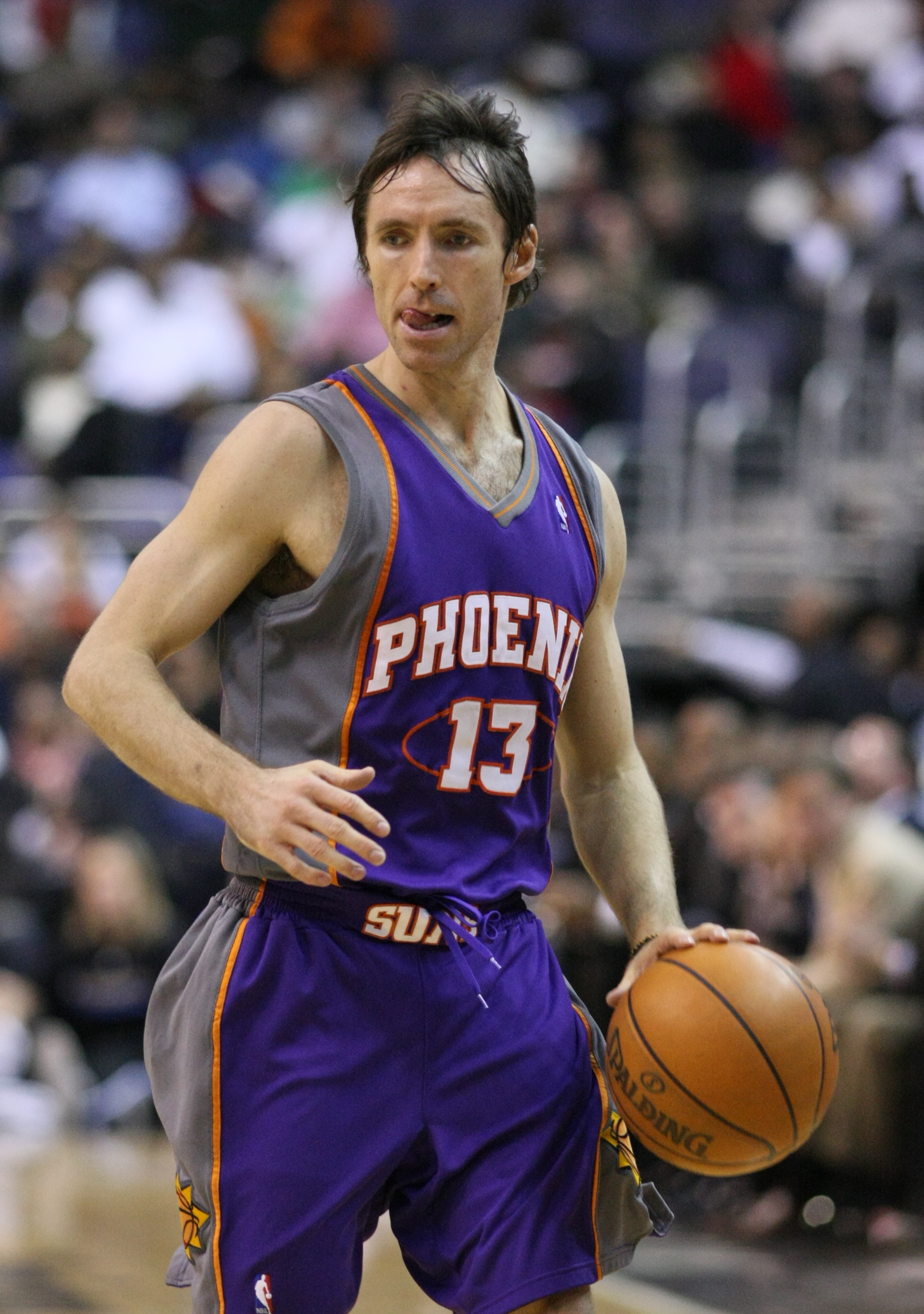
Steve Nash has the sixth-most assists in NBA history, and he is the only player in NBA history to achieve the 50–40–90 club four times.

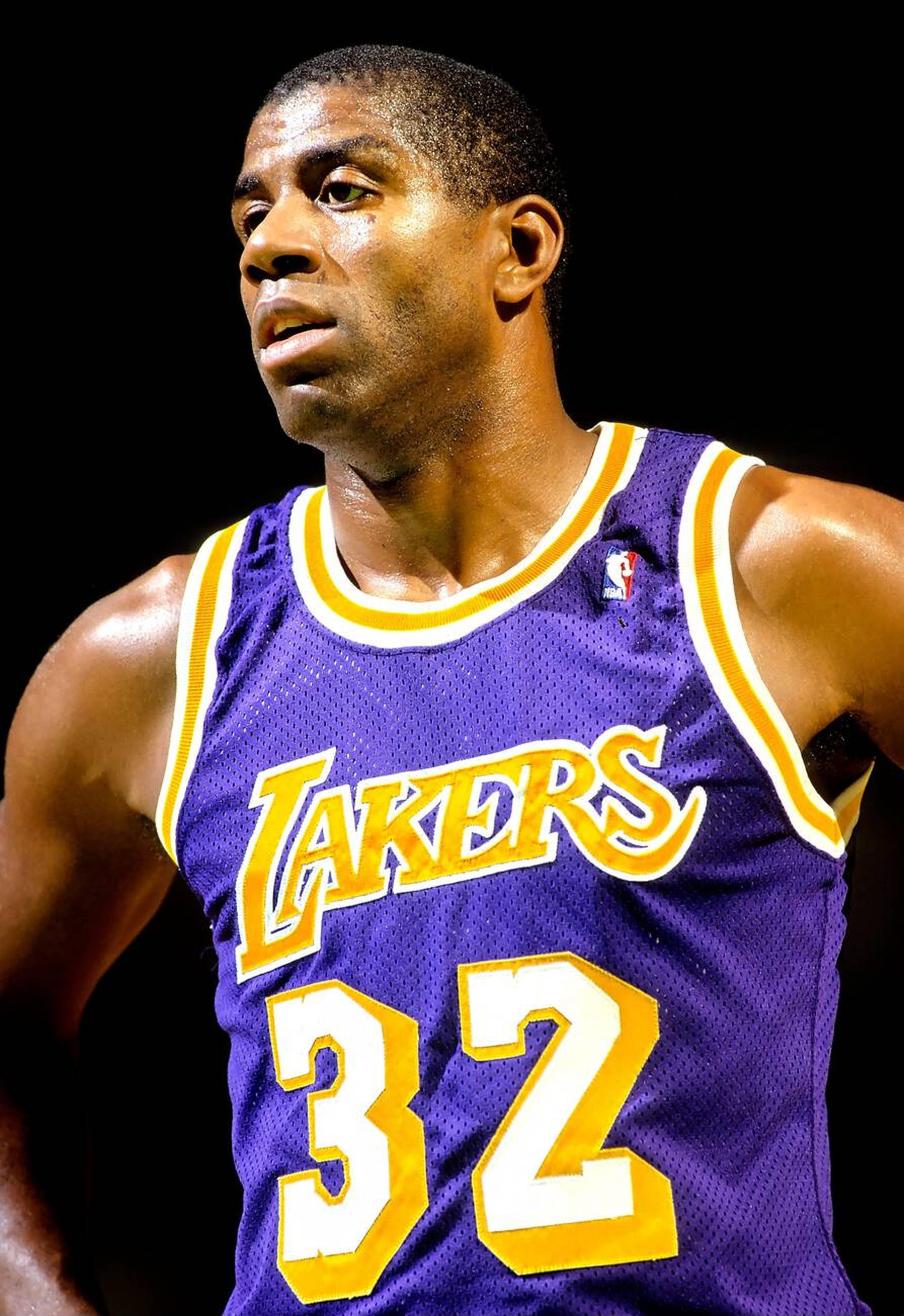
Magic Johnson has the eighth-most assists in NBA history, and has the highest assists per game average (11.2).

Rank	Player	Pos	Team(s) played for (years) (Note: American Basketball Association (ABA) teams other than those admitted into the NBA in 1976 are not included; each year is linked to an article about that particular NBA season.)	Total assists	Games played	Assists per game average (Note: Average is rounded to the nearest tenth.)
1	John Stockton*	PG	Utah Jazz (1984–2003)	15,806	1,504	10.5
2	Chris Paul^{†}	PG	New Orleans Hornets (2005–2011); Los Angeles Clippers (2011–2017, 2025–2026); Houston Rockets (2017–2019); Oklahoma City Thunder (2019–2020); Phoenix Suns (2020–2023); Golden State Warriors (2023–2024); San Antonio Spurs (2024–2025)	12,552	1,370	9.2
3	LeBron James^	SF	Cleveland Cavaliers (2003–2010, 2014–2018); Miami Heat (2010–2014); Los Angeles Lakers (2018–2026); Philadelphia 76ers (2026–present)	12,098	1,634	7.4
4	Jason Kidd*	PG	Dallas Mavericks (1994–1996, 2008–2012); Phoenix Suns (1996–2001); New Jersey Nets (2001–2008); New York Knicks (2012–2013)	12,091	1,391	8.7
5	Russell Westbrook^{†}	PG	Oklahoma City Thunder (2008–2019); Houston Rockets (2019–2020); Washington Wizards (2020–2021); Los Angeles Lakers (2021–2023); Los Angeles Clippers (2023–2024); Denver Nuggets (2024–2025); Sacramento Kings (2025–2026)	10,351	1,301	8.0
6	Steve Nash*	PG	Phoenix Suns (1996–1998, 2004–2012); Dallas Mavericks (1998–2004); Los Angeles Lakers (2012–2015)	10,335	1,217	8.5
7	Mark Jackson	PG	New York Knicks (1987–1992, 2001–2002); Los Angeles Clippers (1992–1994); Indiana Pacers (1994–1996, 1997–2000); Denver Nuggets (1996–1997); Toronto Raptors (2000–2001); Utah Jazz (2002–2003); Houston Rockets (2003–2004)	10,334	1,296	8.0
8	Magic Johnson*	PG	Los Angeles Lakers (1979–1991, 1996)	10,141	906	11.2
9	Oscar Robertson*	PG	Cincinnati Royals (1960–1970); Milwaukee Bucks (1970–1974)	9,887	1,040	9.5
10	Isiah Thomas*	PG	Detroit Pistons (1981–1994)	9,061	979	9.3
11	James Harden^	SG/PG	Oklahoma City Thunder (2009–2012); Houston Rockets (2012–2021); Brooklyn Nets (2021–2022); Philadelphia 76ers (2022–2023); Los Angeles Clippers (2023–2026); Cleveland Cavaliers (2026–present)	8,967	1,236	7.3
12	Gary Payton*	PG	Seattle SuperSonics (1990–2003); Milwaukee Bucks (2003); Los Angeles Lakers (2003–2004); Boston Celtics (2004–2005); Miami Heat (2005–2007)	8,966	1,335	6.7
13	Andre Miller	PG	Cleveland Cavaliers (1999–2002); Los Angeles Clippers (2002–2003); Denver Nuggets (2003–2006, 2011–2014); Philadelphia 76ers (2006–2009); Portland Trail Blazers (2009–2011); Washington Wizards (2014–2015); Sacramento Kings (2015); Minnesota Timberwolves (2015–2016); San Antonio Spurs (2016)	8,524	1,304	6.5
14	Rod Strickland	PG	New York Knicks (1988–1990); San Antonio Spurs (1990–1992); Portland Trail Blazers (1992–1996, 2001); Washington Bullets/Wizards (1996–2001); Miami Heat (2001–2002); Minnesota Timberwolves (2002–2003); Orlando Magic (2003–2004); Toronto Raptors (2004); Houston Rockets (2005)	7,987	1,094	7.3
15	Rajon Rondo	PG	Boston Celtics (2006–2014); Dallas Mavericks (2014–2015); Sacramento Kings (2015–2016); Chicago Bulls (2016–2017); New Orleans Pelicans (2017–2018); Los Angeles Lakers (2018–2020, 2021–2022); Atlanta Hawks (2020–2021); Los Angeles Clippers (2021); Cleveland Cavaliers (2022)	7,584	957	7.9
16	Maurice Cheeks*	PG	Philadelphia 76ers (1978–1989); San Antonio Spurs (1989–1990); New York Knicks (1990–1991); Atlanta Hawks (1991–1992); New Jersey Nets (1993)	7,392	1,101	6.7
17	Lenny Wilkens*	PG	St. Louis Hawks (1960–1968); Seattle SuperSonics (1968–1972); Cleveland Cavaliers (1972–1974); Portland Trail Blazers (1974–1975)	7,211	1,077	6.7
18	Terry Porter	PG	Portland Trail Blazers (1985–1995); Minnesota Timberwolves (1995–1998); Miami Heat (1999); San Antonio Spurs (1999–2002)	7,160	1,274	5.6
19	Kyle Lowry^{†}	PG	Memphis Grizzlies (2006–2009); Houston Rockets (2009–2012); Toronto Raptors (2012–2021); Miami Heat (2021–2024); Philadelphia 76ers (2024–2026)	7,110	1,187	6.0
20	Tim Hardaway*	PG	Golden State Warriors (1989–1996); Miami Heat (1996–2001); Dallas Mavericks (2001–2002); Denver Nuggets (2002); Indiana Pacers (2003)	7,095	867	8.2
21	Tony Parker*	PG	San Antonio Spurs (2001–2018); Charlotte Hornets (2018–2019)	7,036	1,254	5.6
22	Bob Cousy*	PG	Boston Celtics (1950–1963); Cincinnati Royals (1969–1970)	6,955	924	7.5
23	Guy Rodgers*	PG	Philadelphia/San Francisco Warriors (1958–1966); Chicago Bulls (1966–1967); Cincinnati Royals (1967–1968); Milwaukee Bucks (1968–1970)	6,917	892	7.8
24	Jrue Holiday^	PG	Philadelphia 76ers (2009–2013); New Orleans Pelicans (2013–2020); Milwaukee Bucks (2020–2023); Boston Celtics (2023–2025); Portland Trail Blazers (2025–present)	6,819	1,104	6.2
24	Deron Williams	PG	Utah Jazz (2005–2011); New Jersey/Brooklyn Nets (2011–2015); Dallas Mavericks (2015–2017); Cleveland Cavaliers (2017)	6,819	845	8.1
26	Mike Conley^	PG	Memphis Grizzlies (2007–2019); Utah Jazz (2019–2023); Minnesota Timberwolves (2023–2026); Boston Celtics (2026–present)	6,784	1,230	5.5
27	Stephen Curry^	PG	Golden State Warriors (2009–present)	6,782	1,079	6.3
28	Muggsy Bogues	PG	Washington Bullets (1987–1988); Charlotte Hornets (1988–1997); Golden State Warriors (1997–1999); Toronto Raptors (1999–2001)	6,726	889	7.6
29	Kevin Johnson	PG	Cleveland Cavaliers (1987–1988); Phoenix Suns (1988–1998, 2000)	6,711	735	9.1
30	Derek Harper	PG	Dallas Mavericks (1983–1994, 1996–1997); New York Knicks (1994–1996); Orlando Magic (1997–1998); Los Angeles Lakers (1999)	6,577	1,199	5.5
31	Nate Archibald*	PG	Cincinnati Royals/Kansas City(-Omaha) Kings (1970–1976); New York Nets (1976–1977); Boston Celtics (1978–1983); Milwaukee Bucks (1983–1984)	6,476	876	7.4
32	Stephon Marbury	PG	Minnesota Timberwolves (1996–1999); New Jersey Nets (1999–2001); Phoenix Suns (2001–2004); New York Knicks (2004–2009); Boston Celtics (2009)	6,471	846	7.7
33	John Lucas II	PG	Houston Rockets (1976–1978, 1984–1986, 1989–1990); Golden State Warriors (1978–1981); Washington Bullets (1981–1983); San Antonio Spurs (1983–1984); Milwaukee Bucks (1986–1988); Seattle SuperSonics (1988–1989)	6,454	928	7.0
34	Reggie Theus	SG/PG	Chicago Bulls (1978–1984); Kansas City/Sacramento Kings (1984–1988); Atlanta Hawks (1988–1989); Orlando Magic (1989–1990); New Jersey Nets (1990–1991)	6,453	1,026	6.3
35	Norm Nixon	PG	Los Angeles Lakers (1977–1983); San Diego/Los Angeles Clippers (1983–1989)	6,386	768	8.3
36	Kobe Bryant*	SG	Los Angeles Lakers (1996–2016)	6,306	1,346	4.7
37	Jerry West*	PG	Los Angeles Lakers (1960–1974)	6,238	932	6.7
38	Nikola Jokić^	C	Denver Nuggets (2015–present)	6,196	823	7.5
39	Scottie Pippen*	SF	Chicago Bulls (1987–1998, 2003–2004); Houston Rockets (1999); Portland Trail Blazers (1999–2003)	6,135	1,178	5.2
40	Damian Lillard^	PG	Portland Trail Blazers (2012–2023, 2026–present); Milwaukee Bucks (2023–2025)	6,130	914	6.7
41	Clyde Drexler*	SG	Portland Trail Blazers (1983–1995); Houston Rockets (1995–1998)	6,125	1,086	5.6
42	John Havlicek*	SF/SG	Boston Celtics (1962–1978)	6,114	1,270	4.8
43	Baron Davis	PG	Charlotte Hornets (1999–2002); New Orleans Hornets (2002–2005); Golden State Warriors (2005–2008); Los Angeles Clippers (2008–2011); Cleveland Cavaliers (2011); New York Knicks (2011–2012)	6,025	835	7.2
44	Mookie Blaylock	PG	New Jersey Nets (1989–1992); Atlanta Hawks (1992–1999); Golden State Warriors (1999–2002)	5,972	889	6.7
45	Sam Cassell	PG	Houston Rockets (1993–1996); Phoenix Suns (1996); Dallas Mavericks (1996–1997); New Jersey Nets (1997–1999); Milwaukee Bucks (1999–2003); Minnesota Timberwolves (2003–2005); Los Angeles Clippers (2005–2008); Boston Celtics (2008–2009)	5,939	993	6.0
46	Avery Johnson	PG	Seattle SuperSonics (1988–1990); Denver Nuggets (1990, 2001–2002); San Antonio Spurs (1991, 1992–1993, 1994–2001); Houston Rockets (1992); Golden State Warriors (1993–1994, 2003–2004); Dallas Mavericks (2002–2003)	5,846	1,054	5.6
47	Nick Van Exel	PG/SG	Los Angeles Lakers (1993–1998); Denver Nuggets (1998–2002); Dallas Mavericks (2002–2003); Golden State Warriors (2003–2004); Portland Trail Blazers (2004–2005); San Antonio Spurs (2005–2006)	5,777	880	6.6
48	John Wall	PG	Washington Wizards (2010–2020); Houston Rockets (2020–2022); Los Angeles Clippers (2022–2023)	5,735	647	8.9
49	Dwyane Wade*	SG	Miami Heat (2003–2016, 2018–2019); Chicago Bulls (2016–2017); Cleveland Cavaliers (2017–2018)	5,701	1,054	5.4
50	Larry Bird*	SF/PF	Boston Celtics (1979–1992)	5,695	897	6.4

== Progressive list of assists leaders ==
This is a progressive list of assists leaders showing how the record increased through the years.

^	Active NBA player
*	Inducted into the Naismith Memorial Basketball Hall of Fame
†	Not yet eligible for Hall of Fame consideration

Statistics accurate as of November 18, 2026.

Team abbreviationsTeam(s) listed is the one player was on when he established the record.
ATL	Atlanta Hawks	DEN	Denver Nuggets	LAL	Los Angeles Lakers	PHW	Philadelphia Warriors	SEA	Seattle SuperSonics
BOS	Boston Celtics	DET	Detroit Pistons	MIA	Miami Heat	PHX	Phoenix Suns	SFW	San Francisco Warriors
BUF	Buffalo Braves	FTW	Fort Wayne Pistons	MIL	Milwaukee Bucks	POR	Portland Trail Blazers	TOR	Toronto Raptors
CHI	Chicago Bulls	GSW	Golden State Warriors	NJN	New Jersey Nets	PRO	Providence Steamrollers	UTA	Utah Jazz
CHS	Chicago Stags	HOU	Houston Rockets	NOH	New Orleans Hornets	ROC	Rochester Royals	WAS	Washington Wizards
CIN	Cincinnati Royals	IND	Indiana Pacers	NYK	New York Knicks	SAC	Sacramento Kings	WSB	Washington Bullets
CLE	Cleveland Cavaliers	KCO	Kansas City–Omaha Kings	OKC	Oklahoma City Thunder	SAS	San Antonio Spurs		
DAL	Dallas Mavericks	LAC	Los Angeles Clippers	PHI	Philadelphia 76ers	SDC	San Diego Clippers		

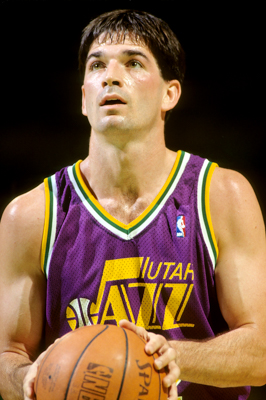
John Stockton has the most assists in NBA history. He is the first to surpass 10,000 career assists and the only player to reach 15,000.

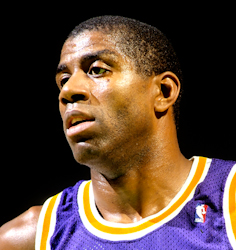
Magic Johnson held the career assists record from 1991 to 1995.

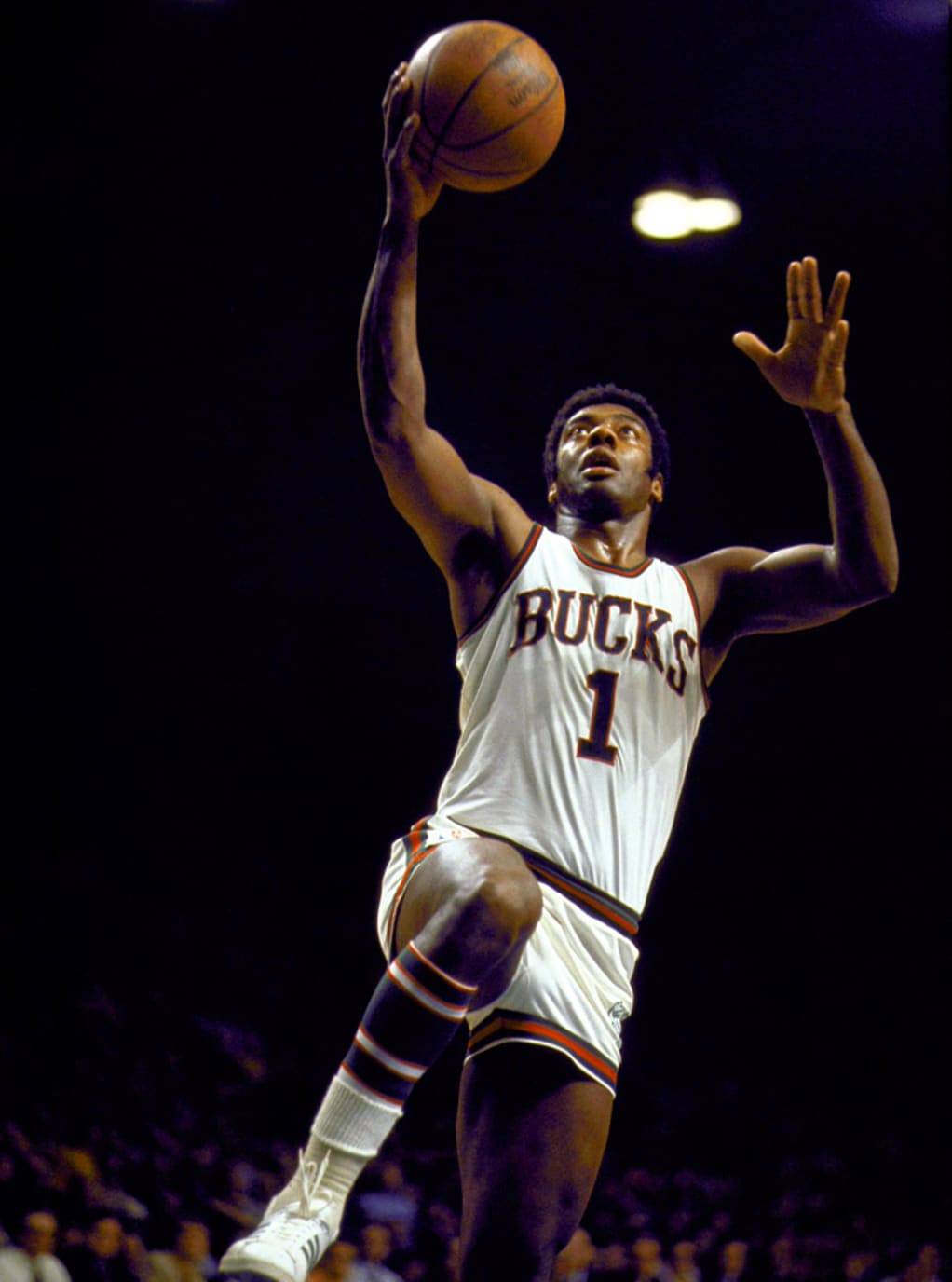
Oscar Robertson held the record from 1969 to 1991.

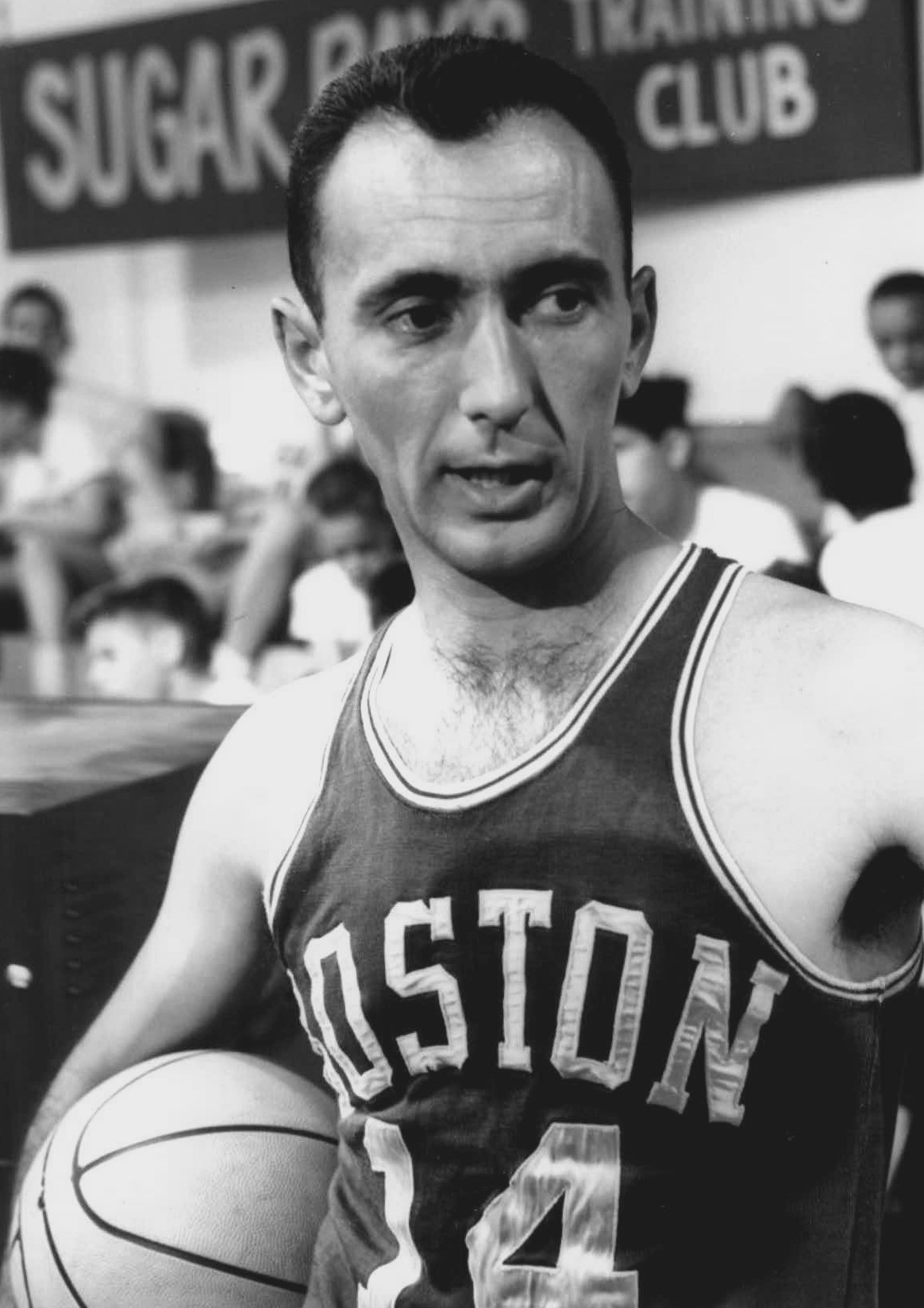
Bob Cousy held the record from 1957 to 1969 and is the first player to eclipse 5,000 career assists.

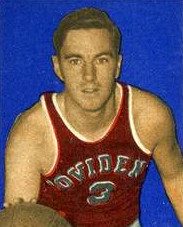
Ernie Calverley held the record from the league's inaugural season to 1949.

Assists leaders and records at the end of every season
Season	Year-by-year leader	AST	Active player leader	AST	Career record	AST	Single-season record	AST	Season
1946–47	Ernie CalverleyPRO	202	Ernie CalverleyPRO	202	Ernie CalverleyPRO	202	Ernie CalverleyPRO	202	1946–47
1947–48	Howie DallmarPHW	120	Ernie CalverleyPRO	321	Ernie CalverleyPRO	321	Ernie CalverleyPRO	202	1947–48
1948–49	Bob Davies*ROC	321	Ernie CalverleyPRO	572	Ernie CalverleyPRO	572	Bob Davies*ROC	321	1948–49
1949–50	Dick McGuire*NYK	386	Andy Phillip*; CHS 1949–50; PHW 1950–52; FTW 1952–56; BOS 1956–57	770	Andy Phillip*; CHS 1949–50; PHW 1950–52; FTW 1952–56; BOS 1956–57	770	Dick McGuire*NYK	386	1949–50
1950–51	Andy Phillip*PHW	414	Andy Phillip*; CHS 1949–50; PHW 1950–52; FTW 1952–56; BOS 1956–57	1,184	Andy Phillip*; CHS 1949–50; PHW 1950–52; FTW 1952–56; BOS 1956–57	1,184	Andy Phillip*PHW	414	1950–51
1951–52	Andy Phillip*PHW	539	Andy Phillip*; CHS 1949–50; PHW 1950–52; FTW 1952–56; BOS 1956–57	1,723	Andy Phillip*; CHS 1949–50; PHW 1950–52; FTW 1952–56; BOS 1956–57	1,723	Andy Phillip*PHW	539	1951–52
1952–53	Bob Cousy*BOS	547	Andy Phillip*; CHS 1949–50; PHW 1950–52; FTW 1952–56; BOS 1956–57	2,120	Andy Phillip*; CHS 1949–50; PHW 1950–52; FTW 1952–56; BOS 1956–57	2,120	Bob Cousy*BOS	547	1952–53
1953–54	Bob Cousy*BOS	518	Andy Phillip*; CHS 1949–50; PHW 1950–52; FTW 1952–56; BOS 1956–57	2,569	Andy Phillip*; CHS 1949–50; PHW 1950–52; FTW 1952–56; BOS 1956–57	2,569	Bob Cousy*BOS	547	1953–54
1954–55	Bob Cousy*BOS	557	Andy Phillip*; CHS 1949–50; PHW 1950–52; FTW 1952–56; BOS 1956–57	3,060	Andy Phillip*; CHS 1949–50; PHW 1950–52; FTW 1952–56; BOS 1956–57	3,060	Bob Cousy*BOS	557	1954–55
1955–56	Bob Cousy*BOS	642	Andy Phillip*; CHS 1949–50; PHW 1950–52; FTW 1952–56; BOS 1956–57	3,470	Andy Phillip*; CHS 1949–50; PHW 1950–52; FTW 1952–56; BOS 1956–57	3,470	Bob Cousy*BOS	642	1955–56
1956–57	Bob Cousy*BOS	478	Andy Phillip*; CHS 1949–50; PHW 1950–52; FTW 1952–56; BOS 1956–57	3,638	Andy Phillip*; CHS 1949–50; PHW 1950–52; FTW 1952–56; BOS 1956–57	3,638	Bob Cousy*BOS	642	1956–57
1957–58	Bob Cousy*BOS	463	Bob Cousy*BOS	3,987	Bob Cousy*BOS	3,987	Bob Cousy*BOS	642	1957–58
1958–59	Bob Cousy*BOS	557	Bob Cousy*BOS	4,544	Bob Cousy*BOS	4,544	Bob Cousy*BOS	642	1958–59
1959–60	Bob Cousy*BOS	715	Bob Cousy*BOS	5,259	Bob Cousy*BOS	5,259	Bob Cousy*BOS	715	1959–60
1960–61	Oscar Robertson*CIN	690	Bob Cousy*BOS	5,846	Bob Cousy*BOS	5,846	Bob Cousy*BOS	715	1960–61
1961–62	Oscar Robertson*CIN	899	Bob Cousy*BOS	6,430	Bob Cousy*BOS	6,430	Oscar Robertson*CIN	899	1961–62
1962–63	Guy Rodgers*SFW	825	Bob Cousy*BOS	6,945	Bob Cousy*BOS	6,945	Oscar Robertson*CIN	899	1962–63
1963–64	Oscar Robertson*CIN	868	Guy Rodgers*SFW	3,444	Bob Cousy*BOS	6,945	Oscar Robertson*CIN	899	1963–64
1964–65	Oscar Robertson*CIN	861	Oscar Robertson*; CIN 1964–70; MIL 1970–74	4,076	Bob Cousy*BOS	6,945	Oscar Robertson*CIN	899	1964–65
1965–66	Oscar Robertson*CIN	847	Oscar Robertson*; CIN 1964–70; MIL 1970–74	4,923	Bob Cousy*BOS	6,945	Oscar Robertson*CIN	899	1965–66
1966–67	Guy Rodgers*CHI	908	Oscar Robertson*; CIN 1964–70; MIL 1970–74	5,768	Bob Cousy*BOS	6,945	Guy Rodgers*CHI	908	1966–67
1967–68	Wilt Chamberlain*PHI	702	Oscar Robertson*; CIN 1964–70; MIL 1970–74	6,401	Bob Cousy*BOS	6,945	Guy Rodgers*CHI	908	1967–68
1968–69	Oscar Robertson*CIN	772	Oscar Robertson*; CIN 1964–70; MIL 1970–74	7,173	Oscar Robertson*; CIN 1968–70; MIL 1970–74	7,173	Guy Rodgers*CHI	908	1968–69
1969–70	Lenny Wilkens*SEA	683	Oscar Robertson*; CIN 1964–70; MIL 1970–74	7,731	Oscar Robertson*; CIN 1968–70; MIL 1970–74	7,731	Guy Rodgers*CHI	908	1969–70
1970–71	Norm Van LierCIN	832	Oscar Robertson*; CIN 1964–70; MIL 1970–74	8,399	Oscar Robertson*; CIN 1968–70; MIL 1970–74	8,399	Guy Rodgers*CHI	908	1970–71
1971–72	Lenny Wilkens*SEA	766	Oscar Robertson*; CIN 1964–70; MIL 1970–74	8,890	Oscar Robertson*; CIN 1968–70; MIL 1970–74	8,890	Guy Rodgers*CHI	908	1971–72
1972–73	Nate Archibald*KCO	910	Oscar Robertson*; CIN 1964–70; MIL 1970–74	9,441	Oscar Robertson*; CIN 1968–70; MIL 1970–74	9,441	Nate Archibald*KCO	910	1972–73
1973–74	Ernie DiGregorioBUF	663	Oscar Robertson*; CIN 1964–70; MIL 1970–74	9,887	Oscar Robertson*; CIN 1968–70; MIL 1970–74	9,887	Nate Archibald*KCO	910	1973–74
1974–75	Kevin PorterWSB	650	Lenny Wilkens*POR	7,211	Oscar Robertson*; CIN 1968–70; MIL 1970–74	9,887	Nate Archibald*KCO	910	1974–75
1975–76	Slick WattsSEA	661	John Havlicek*BOS	5,386	Oscar Robertson*; CIN 1968–70; MIL 1970–74	9,887	Nate Archibald*KCO	910	1975–76
1976–77	Don BuseIND	685	John Havlicek*BOS	5,786	Oscar Robertson*; CIN 1968–70; MIL 1970–74	9,887	Nate Archibald*KCO	910	1976–77
1977–78	Kevin Porter; DET & NJN 1977–78; DET 1978–79	837	John Havlicek*BOS	6,114	Oscar Robertson*; CIN 1968–70; MIL 1970–74	9,887	Nate Archibald*KCO	910	1977–78
1978–79	Kevin Porter; DET & NJN 1977–78; DET 1978–79	1,099	Norm Van LierMIL	5,217	Oscar Robertson*; CIN 1968–70; MIL 1970–74	9,887	Kevin PorterDET	1,099	1978–79
1979–80	Micheal Ray RichardsonNYK	832	Walt Frazier*CLE	5,040	Oscar Robertson*; CIN 1968–70; MIL 1970–74	9,887	Kevin PorterDET	1,099	1979–80
1980–81	Kevin PorterWSB	734	Nate Archibald*; BOS 1980–83; MIL 1983–84	5,366	Oscar Robertson*; CIN 1968–70; MIL 1970–74	9,887	Kevin PorterDET	1,099	1980–81
1981–82	Johnny MooreSAS	762	Nate Archibald*; BOS 1980–83; MIL 1983–84	5,907	Oscar Robertson*; CIN 1968–70; MIL 1970–74	9,887	Kevin PorterDET	1,099	1981–82
1982–83	Magic Johnson*LAL	829	Nate Archibald*; BOS 1980–83; MIL 1983–84	6,316	Oscar Robertson*; CIN 1968–70; MIL 1970–74	9,887	Kevin PorterDET	1,099	1982–83
1983–84	Isiah Thomas*DET Norm NixonSDC	914	Nate Archibald*; BOS 1980–83; MIL 1983–84	6,476	Oscar Robertson*; CIN 1968–70; MIL 1970–74	9,887	Kevin PorterDET	1,099	1983–84
1984–85	Isiah Thomas*DET	1,123	Norm NixonLAC	5,471	Oscar Robertson*; CIN 1968–70; MIL 1970–74	9,887	Isiah Thomas*DET	1,123	1984–85
1985–86	Magic Johnson*LAL	907	Norm NixonLAC	6,047	Oscar Robertson*; CIN 1968–70; MIL 1970–74	9,887	Isiah Thomas*DET	1,123	1985–86
1986–87	Magic Johnson*LAL	977	Magic Johnson*LAL	6,179	Oscar Robertson*; CIN 1968–70; MIL 1970–74	9,887	Isiah Thomas*DET	1,123	1986–87
1987–88	John Stockton*UTA	1,128	Magic Johnson*LAL	7,037	Oscar Robertson*; CIN 1968–70; MIL 1970–74	9,887	John Stockton*UTA	1,128	1987–88
1988–89	John Stockton*UTA	1,118	Magic Johnson*LAL	8,025	Oscar Robertson*; CIN 1968–70; MIL 1970–74	9,887	John Stockton*UTA	1,128	1988–89
1989–90	John Stockton*UTA	1,134	Magic Johnson*LAL	8,932	Oscar Robertson*; CIN 1968–70; MIL 1970–74	9,887	John Stockton*UTA	1,134	1989–90
1990–91	John Stockton*UTA	1,164	Magic Johnson*LAL	9,921	Magic Johnson*LAL	9,921	John Stockton*UTA	1,164	1990–91
1991–92	John Stockton*UTA	1,126	Isiah Thomas*DET	7,991	Magic Johnson*LAL	9,921	John Stockton*UTA	1,164	1991–92
1992–93	John Stockton*UTA	987	Isiah Thomas*DET	8,662	Magic Johnson*LAL	9,921	John Stockton*UTA	1,164	1992–93
1993–94	John Stockton*UTA	1,031	John Stockton*UTA	9,383	Magic Johnson*LAL	9,921	John Stockton*UTA	1,164	1993–94
1994–95	John Stockton*UTA	1,011	John Stockton*UTA	10,394	John Stockton*UTA	10,394	John Stockton*UTA	1,164	1994–95
1995–96	John Stockton*UTA	916	John Stockton*UTA	11,310	John Stockton*UTA	11,310	John Stockton*UTA	1,164	1995–96
1996–97	Mark JacksonDEN & IND	935	John Stockton*UTA	12,170	John Stockton*UTA	12,170	John Stockton*UTA	1,164	1996–97
1997–98	Rod StricklandWAS	801	John Stockton*UTA	12,713	John Stockton*UTA	12,713	John Stockton*UTA	1,164	1997–98
1998–99	Jason Kidd*PHX	539	John Stockton*UTA	13,087	John Stockton*UTA	13,087	John Stockton*UTA	1,164	1998–99
1999–00	Gary Payton*SEA	732	John Stockton*UTA	13,790	John Stockton*UTA	13,790	John Stockton*UTA	1,164	1999–00
2000–01	Jason Kidd*PHX	753	John Stockton*UTA	14,503	John Stockton*UTA	14,503	John Stockton*UTA	1,164	2000–01
2001–02	Andre MillerCLE	882	John Stockton*UTA	15,177	John Stockton*UTA	15,177	John Stockton*UTA	1,164	2001–02
2002–03	Jason Kidd*NJN	711	John Stockton*UTA	15,806	John Stockton*UTA	15,806	John Stockton*UTA	1,164	2002–03
2003–04	Stephon MarburyPHX	719	Mark JacksonHOU	10,334	John Stockton*UTA	15,806	John Stockton*UTA	1,164	2003–04
2004–05	Steve Nash*PHX	861	Gary Payton*; BOS 2004–05; MIA 2005–07	8,508	John Stockton*UTA	15,806	John Stockton*UTA	1,164	2004–05
2005–06	Steve Nash*PHX	826	Gary Payton*; BOS 2004–05; MIA 2005–07	8,765	John Stockton*UTA	15,806	John Stockton*UTA	1,164	2005–06
2006–07	Steve Nash*PHX	884	Gary Payton*; BOS 2004–05; MIA 2005–07	8,966	John Stockton*UTA	15,806	John Stockton*UTA	1,164	2006–07
2007–08	Chris Paul^{†}NOH	925	Jason Kidd*; NJN 2007–08; DAL 2008–12; NYK 2012–13	9,497	John Stockton*UTA	15,806	John Stockton*UTA	1,164	2007–08
2008–09	Chris Paul^{†}NOH	861	Jason Kidd*; NJN 2007–08; DAL 2008–12; NYK 2012–13	10,199	John Stockton*UTA	15,806	John Stockton*UTA	1,164	2008–09
2009–10	Steve Nash*PHX	892	Jason Kidd*; NJN 2007–08; DAL 2008–12; NYK 2012–13	10,923	John Stockton*UTA	15,806	John Stockton*UTA	1,164	2009–10
2010–11	Steve Nash*PHX	855	Jason Kidd*; NJN 2007–08; DAL 2008–12; NYK 2012–13	11,578	John Stockton*UTA	15,806	John Stockton*UTA	1,164	2010–11
2011–12	Steve Nash*PHX	664	Jason Kidd*; NJN 2007–08; DAL 2008–12; NYK 2012–13	11,842	John Stockton*UTA	15,806	John Stockton*UTA	1,164	2011–12
2012–13	Greivis VásquezNOH	704	Jason Kidd*; NJN 2007–08; DAL 2008–12; NYK 2012–13	12,091	John Stockton*UTA	15,806	John Stockton*UTA	1,164	2012–13
2013–14	John WallWAS	721	Steve Nash*LAL	10,335	John Stockton*UTA	15,806	John Stockton*UTA	1,164	2013–14
2014–15	Chris Paul^{†}LAC	838	Andre Miller; SAC 2014–15; MIN 2015–16; SAS 2016	8,437	John Stockton*UTA	15,806	John Stockton*UTA	1,164	2014–15
2015–16	Rajon RondoSAC	839	Andre Miller; SAC 2014–15; MIN 2015–16; SAS 2016	8,524	John Stockton*UTA	15,806	John Stockton*UTA	1,164	2015–16
2016–17	James Harden^HOU	907	Chris Paul^{†} LAC 2016–17; HOU 2017–19; OKC 2019–20; PHX 2020–23; GSW 2023–24; SAS 2024–25; LAC 2025–26	8,251	John Stockton*UTA	15,806	John Stockton*UTA	1,164	2016–17
2017–18	Russell Westbrook^{†}OKC	820	Chris Paul^{†} LAC 2016–17; HOU 2017–19; OKC 2019–20; PHX 2020–23; GSW 2023–24; SAS 2024–25; LAC 2025–26	8,708	John Stockton*UTA	15,806	John Stockton*UTA	1,164	2017–18
2018–19	Russell Westbrook^{†}OKC	784	Chris Paul^{†} LAC 2016–17; HOU 2017–19; OKC 2019–20; PHX 2020–23; GSW 2023–24; SAS 2024–25; LAC 2025–26	9,181	John Stockton*UTA	15,806	John Stockton*UTA	1,164	2018–19
2019–20	LeBron James^LAL	684	Chris Paul^{†} LAC 2016–17; HOU 2017–19; OKC 2019–20; PHX 2020–23; GSW 2023–24; SAS 2024–25; LAC 2025–26	9,653	John Stockton*UTA	15,806	John Stockton*UTA	1,164	2019–20
2020–21	Russell Westbrook^{†}WAS	763	Chris Paul^{†} LAC 2016–17; HOU 2017–19; OKC 2019–20; PHX 2020–23; GSW 2023–24; SAS 2024–25; LAC 2025–26	10,275	John Stockton*UTA	15,806	John Stockton*UTA	1,164	2020–21
2021–22	Trae Young^ATL	737	Chris Paul^{†} LAC 2016–17; HOU 2017–19; OKC 2019–20; PHX 2020–23; GSW 2023–24; SAS 2024–25; LAC 2025–26	10,977	John Stockton*UTA	15,806	John Stockton*UTA	1,164	2021–22
2022–23	Trae Young^ATL	741	Chris Paul^{†} LAC 2016–17; HOU 2017–19; OKC 2019–20; PHX 2020–23; GSW 2023–24; SAS 2024–25; LAC 2025–26	11,501	John Stockton*UTA	15,806	John Stockton*UTA	1,164	2022–23
2023–24	Tyrese Haliburton^IND	752	Chris Paul^{†} LAC 2016–17; HOU 2017–19; OKC 2019–20; PHX 2020–23; GSW 2023–24; SAS 2024–25; LAC 2025–26	11,894	John Stockton*UTA	15,806	John Stockton*UTA	1,164	2023–24
2024–25	Trae Young^ATL	880	Chris Paul^{†} LAC 2016–17; HOU 2017–19; OKC 2019–20; PHX 2020–23; GSW 2023–24; SAS 2024–25; LAC 2025–26	12,499	John Stockton*UTA	15,806	John Stockton*UTA	1,164	2024–25
2025–26	Nikola Jokić^DEN	697	Chris Paul^{†} LAC 2016–17; HOU 2017–19; OKC 2019–20; PHX 2020–23; GSW 2023–24; SAS 2024–25; LAC 2025–26	12,552	John Stockton*UTA	15,806	John Stockton*UTA	1,164	2025–26
2026–27	Trae Young^WAS	142	LeBron James^PHI	12,098	John Stockton*UTA	15,806	John Stockton*UTA	1,164	2026–27
Season	Year-by-year leader	AST	Active player leader	AST	Career record	AST	Single-season record	AST	Season

== See also ==
- List of NBA single-season assists per game leaders
- NBA records
- Basketball statistics
