= Statue of John Stockton =

Public statue in Salt Lake City, Utah

- The statue depicts Stockton making a one-handed pass while running.
- Interactive map of Statue of John Stockton
- Location: Outside the southeast corner of the Delta Center; Salt Lake City, Utah
- Coordinates: 40°46′03″N 111°54′01″W
- Designer: Brian Challis
- Type: Statue
- Material: Bronze
- Height: 13 feet
- Beginning date: November 2003
- Opening date: March 30, 2005
- Dedicated to: John Stockton

The statue of John Stockton is located outside the southeastern corner of the Delta Center in Salt Lake City, Utah, United States. The 13-foot-tall (4 m) bronze statue portrays former Utah Jazz basketball player John Stockton making a one-handed pass while running. Design began in November 2003, and the statue was unveiled to the public during the afternoon of Wednesday, March 30, 2005.

== Design ==
The design of the public sculpture is a realistic depiction of Stockton in dynamic motion. The project supervised by Sandy, Utah sculptor Brian Challis began in November 2003 when he and two photographers (one with a still camera and one with a video camera) met up with Stockton at a Salt Lake City gym. The original plan was to have Stockton make various poses, but after attempting this, it proved untenable because it was impossible to get a natural look. Hence, Challis instructed Stockton to move around and play basketball naturally, which included throwing passes to Challis; meanwhile, the two photographers captured as many different angles and motions as possible.

Thereafter, Challis browsed through thousands of photos of Stockton (a combination of those from the gym photoshoot and those from Stockton's NBA playing days), and made a collection of about 100. Then, Challis narrowed his selection down to ten photos, which he attached to a large poster that he taped to his art studio window. Challis went to work on the original clay model that started taking shape by June 2004. To aid this process, Challis studied intricate details such as human anatomy, the way basketball uniforms wrinkle, and the movement, shape, and form of Stockton's shoes while playing. While sculpting, Challis re-positioned the statue about 20 total times, mostly on the legs and neck; he accomplished this by inserting a wrench into temporary holes to adjust the ball-and-socket joints on the steel rods that served as the statue's infrastructure.

== Unveiling and display ==
The statue was unveiled on the sunny afternoon of Wednesday March 30, 2005. A few hundred people were in attendance, and Stockton's six children cut a ribbon to release the cluster of balloons covering the statue. Stockton briefly addressed the crowd, thanking and crediting several people including his former coach Jerry Sloan who was present. Other attendees included some of Stockton's former teammates, assistant coach Phil Johnson, team owner Larry Miller, and Stockton's whole family. The bronze statue stands at a total height of 13 feet, including the five-foot base, and it depicts Stockton making a one-handed pass while running which he is famous for.

=== Mask prank incident ===
In January 2022, a fan placed a mask on the statue's face in response to Stockton's public opposition to COVID-19 lockdowns, the vaccine, and mask mandates.
