= Michael Stockton =

American basketball player (born 1989)

Personal information
- Born: May 7, 1989 (age 37) Spokane, Washington, U.S.
- Listed height: 6 ft 1 in (1.85 m)
- Listed weight: 170 lb (77 kg)

Career information
- High school: Gonzaga Preparatory School (Spokane, Washington)
- College: Westminster (2007–2011)
- NBA draft: 2011: undrafted
- Playing career: 2011–2026
- Position: Point guard

Career history
- 2011–2013: Karlsruhe
- 2013–2015: MHP Riesen Ludwigsburg
- 2015–2016: Canton Charge
- 2016–2017: Avtodor Saratov
- 2017: Apollon Patras
- 2017–2019: Göttingen
- 2019–2021: Cholet Basket
- 2021–2022: Budivelnyk
- 2022: Champagne Basket
- 2022–2023: Élan Béarnais Pau-Orthez
- 2023–2024: BCM Gravelines-Dunkerque
- 2024–2025: Élan Chalon
- 2025–2026: JDA Dijon

Career highlights
- 2x BBL All-Star (2018, 2019); Third-team NAIA D1 All-American (2011)
- Stats at Basketball Reference

Michael Stockton (born May 7, 1989) is an American former professional basketball player. He played college basketball for the Griffins from Westminster College. He is the son of longtime Utah Jazz Hall of Fame point guard John Stockton.

== Professional career ==
=== Karlsruhe (2011–2013) ===
Stockton went undrafted in the 2011 NBA draft. In July 2011, he signed his first professional contract with BG Karlsruhe of the German Pro A league.

In July 2012, Stockton joined the Utah Jazz for the 2012 NBA Summer League where he averaged 3.6 points, 1.2 rebounds and 2.0 assists in five games. He later re-joined BG Karlsruhe for the 2012–13 season.

In July 2013, Stockton re-joined the Utah Jazz for the 2013 NBA Summer League where he averaged 4.3 points and 1.3 rebounds in three games.

=== Riesen Ludwigsburg (2013–2015) ===
On August 30, 2013, Stockton signed with MHP Riesen Ludwigsburg of the Basketball Bundesliga.

On June 10, 2014, Stockton re-signed with Riesen Ludwigsburg on a one-year deal. In July 2014, he joined the Oklahoma City Thunder for the 2014 NBA Summer League. In 28 games for Ludwigsburg in 2014–15, he averaged 8.9 points, 2.4 rebounds and 2.7 assists per game.

=== Canton Charge (2015–2016) ===
On October 31, 2015, Stockton was selected by the Grand Rapids Drive in the second round of the 2015 NBA Development League Draft and later that night traded to the Canton Charge for Adrian Forbes.

=== Avtodor Saratov (2016–2017) ===
After joining the Cleveland Cavaliers for the 2016 NBA Summer League, Stockton signed with Avtodor Saratov of the VTB United League on September 10, 2016. On January 23, 2017, Stockton left Avtodor Saratov.

=== Apollon Patras (2017) ===
Stockton signed with Apollon Patras for the rest of the 2016–17 Greek Basket League season.

=== Göttingen (2017–2019) ===
On July 14, 2017, Stockton signed a one-year contract with German Bundesliga side BG Göttingen.

=== Cholet Basket (2019–2021) ===
Stockton signed with Cholet Basket on July 15, 2019. He averaged 12.2 points and 6.8 assists per game during the 2019–20 season. He signed a two-year extension with the team on June 15, 2020.

=== Budivelnyk (2021–2022) ===
On July 27, 2021, Stockton signed with Budivelnyk of the Ukrainian Basketball Super League. In February 2022, he left the team in the prelude to the Russian invasion of Ukraine.

=== Champagne Basket (2022) ===
On April 2, 2022, he has signed with Champagne Basket of the LNB Pro A.

=== Pau-Orthez (2022–2023) ===
On August 17, 2022, he has signed with Élan Béarnais Pau-Orthez for the French Pro A.

=== Elan Chalon (2024–2025) ===
Stockton signed with Elan Chalon in November 2024

== Personal life ==
Stockton is the son of John and Nada Stockton. His father played 19 years for the Utah Jazz and entered the Naismith Basketball Hall of Fame in 2009. His great-grandfather, Houston Stockton, played football for Gonzaga from 1922 to 1924, going undefeated his senior year of 1924 as he earned All-America honorable mention honors. His brother, Houston, played football for the University of Montana. Another brother, David, played college basketball at Gonzaga and played professionally in the NBA.
