= BG Karlsruhe =

- Leagues: ProB
- Founded: 1993; 32 years ago
- History: BG Karlsruhe (1993–present)
- Arena: Friedrich-List-Halle
- Capacity: 800
- Location: Karlsruhe, Germany
- Team colors: Blue, White
- Head coach: Toni Radić
- Website: www.bg-karlsruhe.de
Home	Away

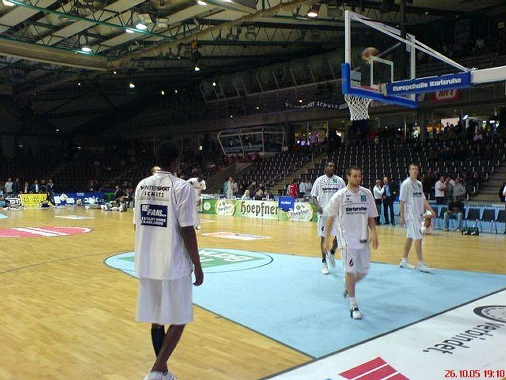
A game in the Europahalle in the 2005–06 season

BG Karlsruhe is a professional basketball club based in Karlsruhe, Germany. The club currently that plays in the third tier level of Germany, the ProB. From 2003 until 2014 the team played in the Europahalle. After this stint, they moved to the smaller Friedrich-List-Halle.

From the season 2003–04 until the 2006–07 season, Karlsruhe played in the Basketball Bundesliga (BBL), the top professional league of Germany.

== Players ==
BG Karlsruhe roster
Players
Coaches

Pos.	No.	Nat.	Name	Ht.	Age
PG		(Croatia)	Lazic, Vuk	1.90 m (6 ft 3 in)	26 – 15 April 1998
SF		(Germany)	Fouda, Jalen	193 m (633 ft 2 in)	25 – 4 November 1999
G		(Germany)	Muench, Florian	1.91 m (6 ft 3 in)	35 – 4 August 1989
PF		(Bosnia and Herzegovina)	Stipanovic, Petar	2.00 m (6 ft 7 in)	26 – 19 June 1998
SF		(Germany)	Nebo, Ogechi	1.93 m (6 ft 4 in)	27 – 7 August 1997
SG		(Croatia)	Juran, Pere	1.90 m (6 ft 3 in)	28 – 22 May 1996
C		(Portugal)	de Sousa, Malony	2.08 m (6 ft 10 in)	32 – 1 January 1993
G		(United States)	McGee, Daniel	1.88 m (6 ft 2 in)	33 – 14 September 1991
C		(Croatia)	Lozancic, Jure	2.11 m (6 ft 11 in)	41 – 27 April 1983
PG		(Croatia)	Markoc, Ante	1.88 m (6 ft 2 in)	31 – 29 September 1993
PG		(Lithuania)	Gimzauskas, Tadas	1.88 m (6 ft 2 in)	29 – 10 July 1995
SG		(Slovakia)	Skvasik, Roman	1.93 m (6 ft 4 in)	28 – 9 November 1996

Head coach

- (Croatia) Toni Radić

Legend

- (C) Team captain
- Injured

=== Notable players ===
Note: Flags indicate national team eligibility at FIBA-sanctioned events. Players may hold other non-FIBA nationalities not displayed.

Criteria

To appear in this section a player must have either:

- Set a club record or won an individual award while at the club
- Played at least one official international match for their national team at any time
- Played at least one official NBA match at any time.

- (Germany) David McCray
- (Slovakia) Anton Gavel
- (Israel) Anton Kazarnovski
- (United States) Troy DeVries
- (United States) Domonic Jones
- (United States) Michael Stockton
- (United States) Tarvis Williams
