= David Stockton =

American basketball player (born 1991)

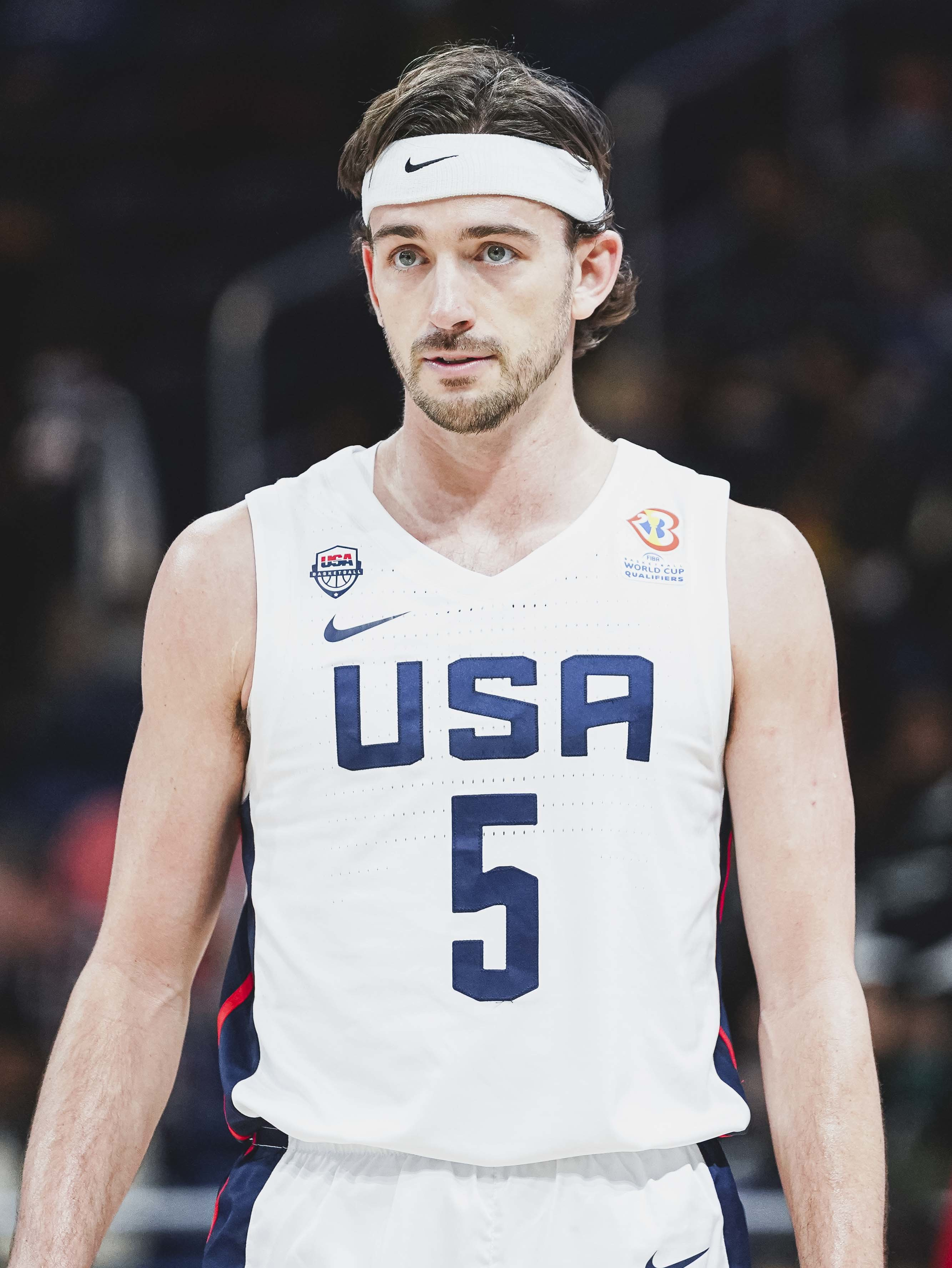
- Stockton with the U.S. national team during the qualifiers for the 2023 World Cup

No. 11 – Valley Suns
- Position: Point guard
- League: NBA G League

Personal information
- Born: June 24, 1991 (age 35) Spokane, Washington, U.S.
- Listed height: 5 ft 11 in (1.80 m)
- Listed weight: 172 lb (78 kg)

Career information
- High school: Gonzaga Prep (Spokane, Washington)
- College: Gonzaga (2010–2014)
- NBA draft: 2014: undrafted
- Playing career: 2014–present

Career history
- 2014–2016: Reno Bighorns
- 2015: Sacramento Kings
- 2016: Cedevita Zagreb
- 2016–2017: New Zealand Breakers
- 2017–2018: Reno Bighorns
- 2018: Utah Jazz
- 2018–2019: Medi Bayreuth
- 2019–2020: South Bay Lakers
- 2020: Mets de Guaynabo
- 2021: Memphis Hustle
- 2021: Mets de Guaynabo
- 2021–2022: Memphis Hustle
- 2022–2023: Fort Wayne Mad Ants
- 2023: Cangrejeros de Santurce
- 2023–2024: NBA G League Ignite
- 2024: Capitanes de Arecibo
- 2024–2025: Valley Suns
- 2025: Piratas de Quebradillas
- 2026–present: Valley Suns

Career highlights
- NBA D-League All-Rookie Second Team (2015); BSN assists leader (2021)
- Stats at NBA.com
- Stats at Basketball Reference

David James Stockton (born June 24, 1991) is an American professional basketball player for the Valley Suns of the NBA G League. He played college basketball for the Gonzaga Bulldogs and is the son of Hall of Fame point guard John Stockton.

== High school career ==
Stockton attended Gonzaga Preparatory School in Spokane, Washington. As a senior in 2008–09, he averaged 12.4 points in 20 games as he helped lead the Bullpups to a 24–6 record. He led all scorers with 22 points as Gonzaga Prep defeated Inglemoor 72–64 in overtime to claim fourth place in the 2009 Washington State Class 4A Basketball Tournament. He also quarterbacked Prep's football team to an 8–2 record as senior.

== College career ==
After redshirting the 2009–10 season, Stockton joined the Gonzaga Bulldogs for his freshman season in 2010–11. He appeared in 34 of 35 games off the bench as he averaged 4.2 points, 1.3 rebounds and 2.1 assists in 15.6 minutes per game.

In his sophomore season, Stockton started his first career game in the season opener against Eastern Washington, before coming off the bench for the rest of the season. In 33 games, he averaged 3.7 points, 1.0 rebounds and 2.4 assists in 16.8 minutes per game.

In his junior season, Stockton appeared in all 35 games with his lone start coming against Lewis-Clark State College. He scored a season-high 13 points against the Warriors to best his 12-point performance opening-night against Southern Utah. He averaged 3.7 points, 1.7 rebounds, 3.4 assists and 1.5 steals in 18.7 minutes per game.

In his senior season, Stockton was named to the 2014 WCC All-Tournament Team after helping Gonzaga win the tournament. In 36 games (all starts), he averaged 7.4 points, 2.4 rebounds, 4.2 assists and 1.5 steals in 27.8 minutes per game.

== Professional career ==
=== Reno Bighorns (2014–2015) ===
After going undrafted in the 2014 NBA draft, Stockton joined the Phoenix Suns for the 2014 NBA Summer League. On September 29, 2014, he signed with the Washington Wizards. However, he was later waived by the Wizards on October 3. On November 1, he was selected by the Maine Red Claws in the third round of the 2014 NBA Development League Draft. He was later traded to the Reno Bighorns on draft night.

=== Sacramento Kings (2015) ===
On February 20, 2015, Stockton signed a 10-day contract with the Sacramento Kings. The next day, he made his NBA debut, recording one point, two rebounds and one assist in the Kings' 126–99 loss to the Los Angeles Clippers. Following the expiry of his contract on March 1, the Kings decided to not re-sign Stockton to a second 10-day contract. On March 2, he was reacquired by Reno, and four days later, he tied the NBA Development League record for most assists in a game with 22 against the Texas Legends. On March 22, Stockton recorded his first career triple-double after recording 36 points, 10 rebounds and 14 assists in a 128–113 win over the Idaho Stampede. On April 12, he returned to the Kings, signing with them through the 2015–16 season.

=== Return to the Bighorns (2015–2016) ===
In July 2015, Stockton joined the Kings for the 2015 NBA Summer League. On October 22, he was waived by the Kings after appearing in three preseason games. On November 27, he was reacquired by the Reno Bighorns.

In July 2016, Stockton re-joined the Kings for the 2016 NBA Summer League.

=== Cedevita Zagreb (2016) ===
On July 23, 2016, Stockton signed a three-year deal with Croatian club Cedevita Zagreb. In early November 2016, he left Cedevita in order to sign in New Zealand.

=== New Zealand Breakers (2016–2017) ===
On November 10, 2016, Stockton signed with the New Zealand Breakers for the rest of the 2016–17 NBL season, as an injury replacement player for Ben Woodside. He made his debut for the Breakers on November 18, scoring an equal game-high 17 points in 24 minutes off the bench in a 100–85 win over the Illawarra Hawks. On December 2, he recorded a game-high 24 points and 10 assists in a 95–91 loss to Illawarra. He averaged 15 points and 6.5 assists per game over his first four outings with the Breakers, but over his next six games, his numbers dropped considerably, as he failed to record double digits in either points or assists. On January 7, 2017, he was released by the Breakers due to what the club cited as an ongoing back injury. In 10 games, he averaged 8.3 points, 2.7 rebounds and 4.2 assists per game.

=== Third stint with the Bighorns (2017–2018) ===
On February 24, 2017, Stockton was reacquired by the Reno Bighorns.

In July 2017, Stockton joined the Phoenix Suns for the 2017 NBA Summer League. He signed with the Sacramento Kings on October 10, 2017, and then waived five days later. On October 22, he was named in the Reno Bighorns 2017–18 training camp roster.

=== Utah Jazz (2018) ===
On March 17, 2018, Stockton signed a 10-day contract with the Utah Jazz. With his father John Stockton in attendance, he made his debut for the Jazz on March 25, scoring two points off free throws in a 110–91 win over the Golden State Warriors. He signed a second 10-day contract on March 27, and a rest-of-season contract on April 6.

=== Medi Bayreuth (2018–2019) ===
On August 1, 2018, Stockton signed with Medi Bayreuth of the German Basketball Bundesliga.

=== South Bay Lakers (2019–2020) ===
On October 4, 2019, Stockton signed with the Los Angeles Lakers. He was waived in training camp but added to the roster of the Lakers' G League affiliate, the South Bay Lakers. On November 30, 2019, Stockton posted 30 points, 10 assists, five rebounds and four steals in a loss to the Rio Grande Valley Vipers. He missed two games in December with a hamstring injury. Stockton averaged 15.3 points, 2.6 rebounds, 6.9 assists and 1.2 steals per game.

=== Mets de Guaynabo (2020) ===
On October 26, 2020, Stockton signed with the Mets de Guaynabo of Puerto Rico's Baloncesto Superior Nacional.

=== Memphis Hustle (2021) ===
On January 11, 2021, the Memphis Hustle acquired Stockton's returning player rights from the South Bay Lakers in exchange for the returning rights to Dusty Hannahs. On January 26, 2021, Stockton signed with the Hustle.

=== Return to Mets de Guaynabo (2021) ===
On June 22, 2021, Stockton re-signed with the Mets de Guaynabo.

=== Return to the Hustle (2021–2022) ===
On October 15, 2021, Stockton signed with the Memphis Grizzlies, but was waived the next day. On October 23, he re-signed with the Memphis Hustle. Stockton was removed from the team on February 14, 2022. He was reacquired by the Hustle on February 28.

=== Fort Wayne Mad Ants (2022–2023) ===
On September 16, 2022, Stockton signed with the Indiana Pacers, but was waived one week later.

On October 24, 2022, Stockton joined the Fort Wayne Mad Ants training camp roster.

=== Cangrejeros de Santurce (2023) ===
On April 10, 2023, Stockton signed with Cangrejeros de Santurce of the Puerto Rican league.

=== NBA G League Ignite (2023–2024) ===
On August 28, 2023, Stockton signed with the NBA G League Ignite, but was waived on January 10, 2024. As a result of the team folding following the 2023–24 NBA G League season, Stockton's player defer rights were transferred to the Indiana Mad Ants.

=== Capitanes de Arecibo (2024) ===
On February 1, 2024, Stockton signed with the Capitanes de Arecibo of the Baloncesto Superior Nacional.

=== Valley Suns (2024–present) ===
On September 27, 2024, Stockton signed an Exhibit 10 deal with the Phoenix Suns, but was waived three days later. On October 27, he joined the Valley Suns.

On September 18, 2026, Stockton signed a non–guaranteed, training camp contract with Phoenix. He was waived by the Suns the same day.

== Career statistics ==
Legend
GP	Games played	GS	Games started	MPG	Minutes per game
FG%	Field goal percentage	3P%	3-point field goal percentage	FT%	Free throw percentage
RPG	Rebounds per game	APG	Assists per game	SPG	Steals per game
BPG	Blocks per game	PPG	Points per game	**Bold**	Career high

=== NBA ===
==== Regular season ====
Year	Team	GP	GS	MPG	FG%	3P%	FT%	RPG	APG	SPG	BPG	PPG
2014–15	Sacramento	**3**	0	**11.0**	.333	.500	.500	**.7**	**3.0**	**.7**	.0	2.7
2017–18	Utah	**3**	0	3.0	**.667**	**.667**	**1.000**	.0	.0	.0	.0	**3.3**
Career		6	0	7.0	.444	.600	.700	.3	1.5	.3	.0	3.0

==== Playoffs ====
Year	Team	GP	GS	MPG	FG%	3P%	FT%	RPG	APG	SPG	BPG	PPG
2018	Utah	2	0	3.0	.333	.000	—	.5	.0	.0	.0	1.0
Career		2	0	3.0	.333	.000	—	.5	.0	.0	.0	1.0

== Personal life ==
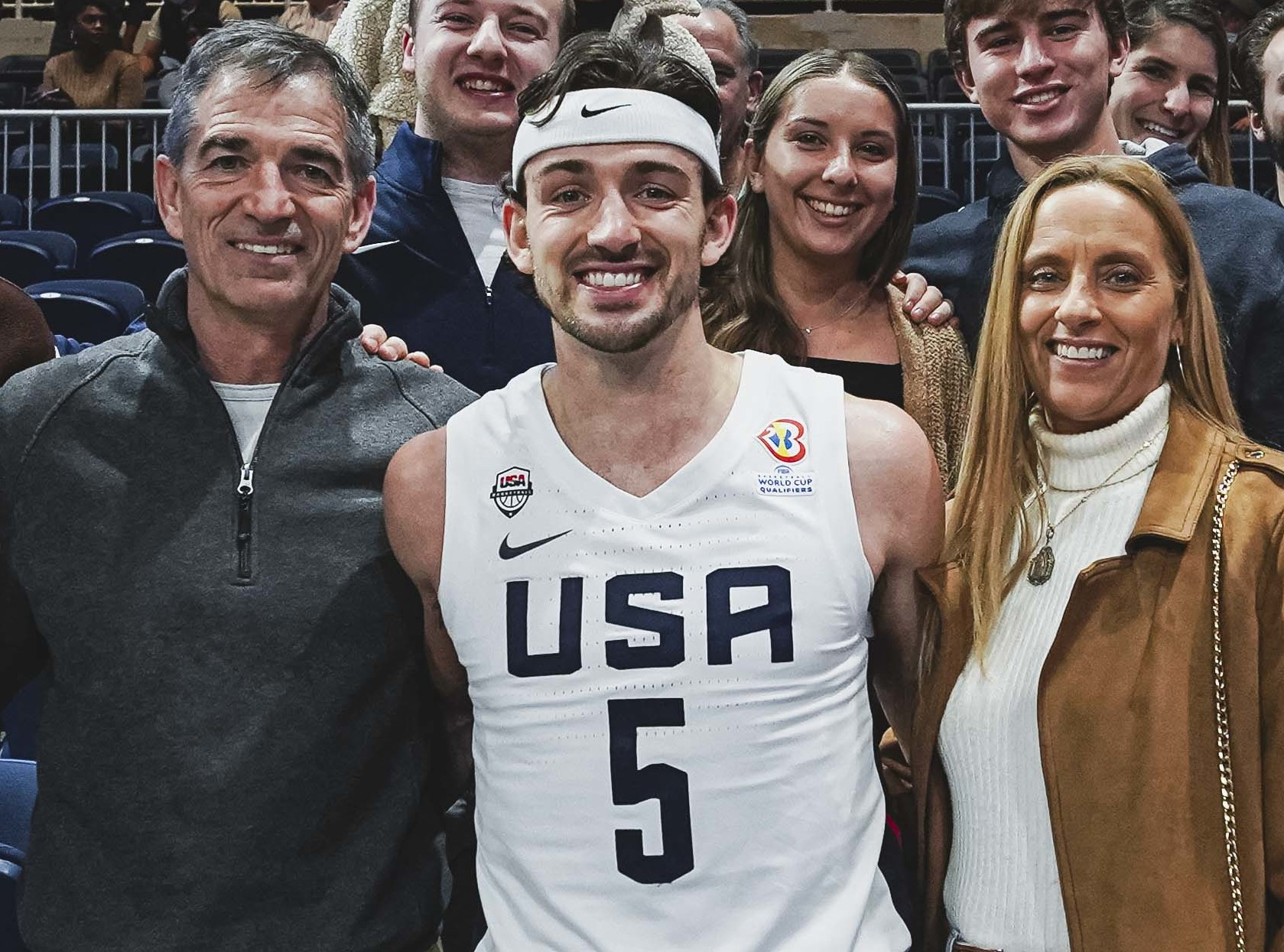
Stockton with his parents in 2022

Stockton is the son of John and Nada Stockton. His father played 19 years for the Utah Jazz and entered the Naismith Basketball Hall of Fame in 2009. His great-grandfather, Houston Stockton, played football for Gonzaga from 1922 to 1924, going undefeated his senior year of 1924 as he earned All-America honorable mention honors. His eldest brother, Houston Jr., played football for University of Montana, and older brother, Michael, currently plays professional basketball in France.

Stockton is eligible for a Croatian passport, because his mother Nada is of Montenegrin and Croatian descent. She is a daughter of American politician Mike Stepovich.

== See also ==
- List of second-generation National Basketball Association players
