= Daniel McGee =

American statistician

- Education: University of California at Berkeley; Johns Hopkins University
- Awards: Fellow of the American Statistical Association (1992)
- Scientific career
- Fields: Statistics
- Institutions: United States Public Health Service; Florida State University
- Thesis: Homogeneity of the effect of risk factors on the incidence of cardiovascular diseases (1978)

Daniel McGee is an American statistician and professor emeritus of statistics at Florida State University, where he formerly chaired the department of statistics. Before joining the faculty of Florida State in 2002, he worked for the United States Public Health Service and in academic medicine. He chaired Florida State's department of statistics from 2005 to 2011 and retired from the faculty there in May 2019. He was elected a Fellow of the American Statistical Association in 1992.
