= Delta Center =

Arena in Salt Lake City, Utah, U.S.

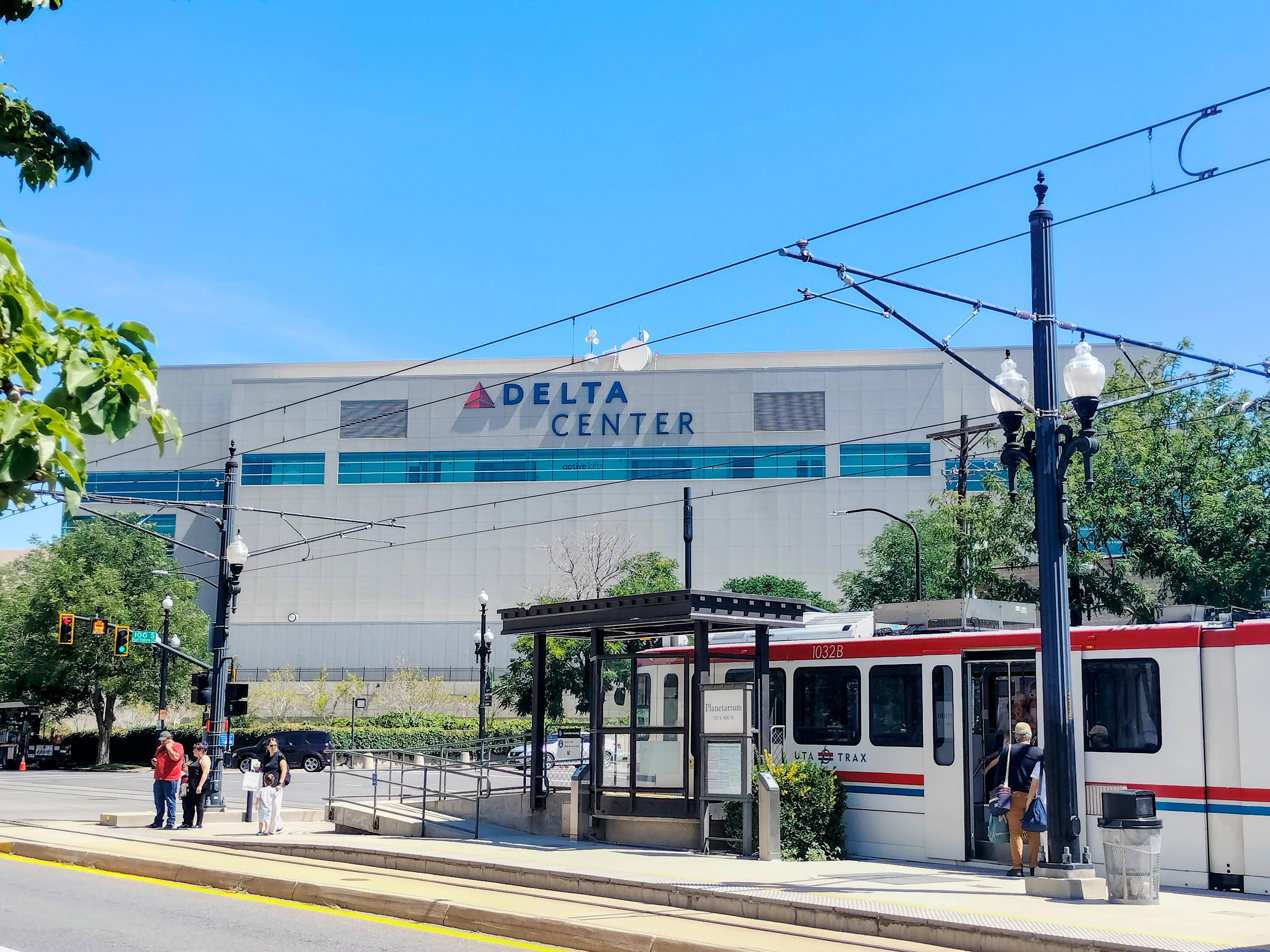
- The Delta Center in 2023

- Location in Utah Location in the United States Location in North America
- Interactive map of Delta Center
- Former names: Delta Center (1991–2006, 2023–present); Salt Lake Ice Center (2002); EnergySolutions Arena (2006–2015); Vivint Smart Home Arena (2015–2020); Vivint Arena (2020–2023)
- Address: 301 West South Temple
- Location: Salt Lake City, Utah, U.S.
- Coordinates: 40°46′6″N 111°54′4″W
- Owner: Ryan Smith
- Operator: Smith Entertainment Group
- Capacity: Basketball: 17,867; Concerts: 20,000; Ice hockey: 16,020; NuSkin Theater: 3,000–7,000
- Executive suites: 56
- Public transit: (at Arena)

Construction
- Groundbreaking: May 22, 1990; 36 years ago
- Opened: October 9, 1991; 35 years ago
- Renovated: May–Sept. 2017 (fan experience upgrades); May–Sept. 2024 (Utah Mammoth arrival); April 2025–present (full renovation)
- Cost: US$93 million ($229 million in 2025 dollars)
- Architect: FFKR Architecture
- Structural engineer: Ralph L. Wadsworth Engineering
- Services engineers: Olsen & Peterson Consulting Engineers, Inc.
- General contractor: Ohbayashi/Sahara

Tenants
- Utah Jazz (NBA) (1991–present); Salt Lake Golden Eagles (IHL) (1991–1994); Utah Grizzlies (IHL) (1995–1997); Utah Starzz (WNBA) (1997–2002); Utah Blaze (AFL) (2006–2008, 2011–2013); Utah Hockey Club/Mammoth (NHL) (2024–present)

Website
- deltacenter.com

Delta Center is an indoor venue in Salt Lake City, Utah, United States. Opened in 1991, the arena is the home of the Utah Jazz of the National Basketball Association (NBA) and the Utah Mammoth of the National Hockey League (NHL). The arena has a seating capacity of 17,867 for basketball, up to 16,020 for ice hockey and indoor football, and 20,000 for concerts. It has 56 luxury suites and 668 club seats.

It has also hosted other professional sports teams including the Utah Blaze of the Arena Football League and the Utah Starzz of the Women's National Basketball Association (WNBA). During the 2002 Winter Olympics, the arena hosted figure skating and short-track speed skating competitions under the name "Salt Lake Ice Center". It is expected to host ice hockey during the 2034 Winter Olympics.

The Delta Center is the third oldest arena in the NBA, after Madison Square Garden in New York City and Target Center in Minneapolis, and the fourth oldest arena in the NHL, after Climate Pledge Arena in Seattle, Madison Square Garden and Scotiabank Saddledome in Calgary.

== History ==
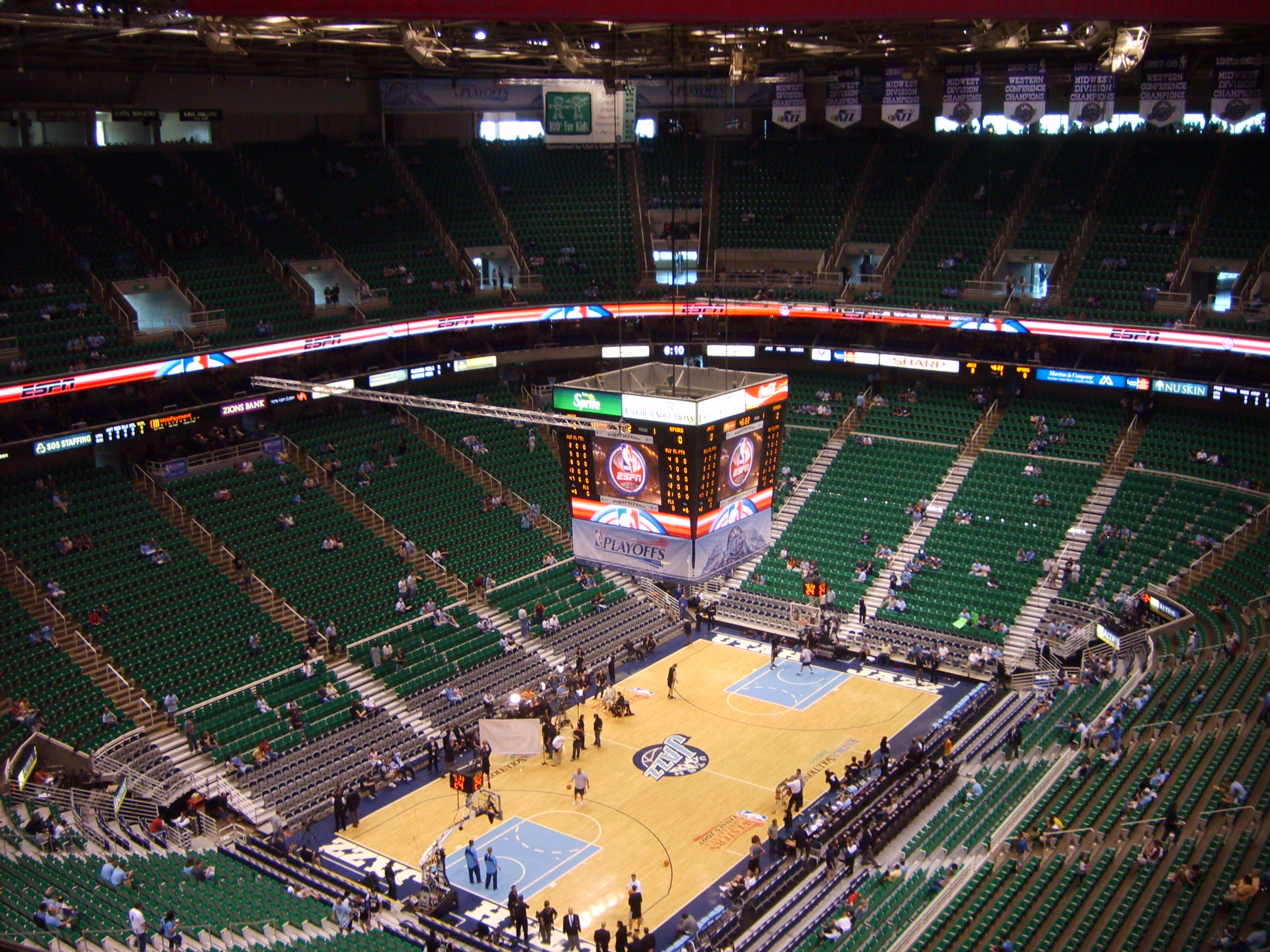
Interior arena bowl in May 2007, before a Jazz conference finals game against the San Antonio Spurs.

The arena was originally imagined as a 20,000-seat home for the Utah Jazz and Salt Lake Golden Eagles to replace the since-demolished Salt Palace arena, which had 12,616 seats. Under the leadership and private financing of Utah businessman Larry H. Miller, ground was broken on May 22, 1990, and it was completed on October 4, 1991, in time for late-October basketball games, at a cost of US$93 million (US$220 million in 2025 dollars).

Naming rights to the arena were acquired by Delta Air Lines, naming it Delta Center. The first game played in the arena was a Golden Eagles game against the Peoria Rivermen on October 16, 1991, which the home team lost 4–2. The Eagles had also played the inaugural game in the Salt Palace arena when it opened on October 10, 1969.

The Delta Center hosted its first concert on October 24, 1991, headlined by Oingo Boingo.

The first basketball game played in the arena was a Jazz pre-season loss against the New York Knicks, 101–95. The first regular season game for the Jazz was a 103–95 loss to the Seattle SuperSonics on November 7, 1991.

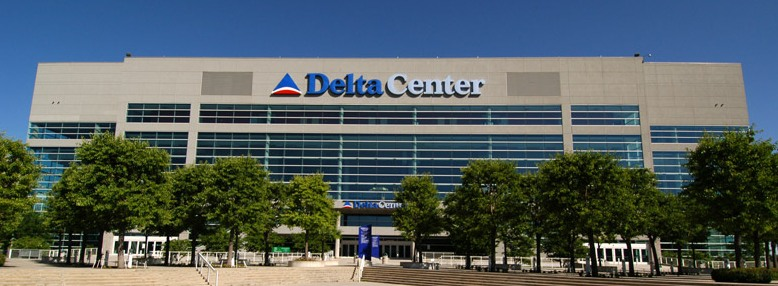
Exterior view of arena, 2005

In addition to the Utah Jazz and Blaze, the arena was the home of the WNBA's Utah Starzz from 1997 to 2002, the Salt Lake Golden Eagles from 1991 to 1994, and the Utah Grizzlies from 1995 to 1997, both of the International Hockey League. On June 8, 1996, the Delta Center hosted what was then the largest crowd in the history of American minor league hockey: 17,381 fans attended game four of the 1996 Turner Cup Finals.

The arena's roof was damaged by severe winds associated with the Salt Lake City Tornado of August 11, 1999, costing US$3.757 million to repair.

Dan Roberts served as the public address announcer for the Jazz, since before the arena was built, before he retired in April 2025.

In 2006, amid the company's bankruptcy, Delta declined to renew its naming rights. A new agreement was reached with Salt Lake City-based radioactive waste disposal company EnergySolutions, renaming it EnergySolutions Arena. The new name was unveiled November 20, prior to the Jazz's home game against the Toronto Raptors. Two stickers were placed on the court, covering up the arena's old name with the new one. The temporary logos were replaced with official logos on the court sometime in December. EnergySolutions naming rights were set to expire in 2016.

Initial fan reactions to the new name were predominantly negative, leading to calls for the Jazz to re-evaluate the agreement, and the arena receiving fan nicknames mocking EnergySolutions' radioactive and hazardous waste disposal operations (such as "the Chernobowl", "the Dump", "the Fallout Shelter", "Half-Life Arena", "JazzMat", "Radium Stadium", and "the Tox Box"). Team owner Larry H. Miller defended the deal, considering the naming rights "a winner".

On April 15, 2010, over a year after the death of Larry H. Miller, the Jazz basketball court was named in his honor.

On October 26, 2015, the naming rights were acquired by the Lehi-based home security and automation provider Vivint under a ten-year contract. On September 21, 2016, the Jazz announced plans to renovate and upgrade the arena. The majority of the construction related to the building's renovation, which cost US$125 million. The construction began at the conclusion of the 2016–17 Utah Jazz basketball season and was completed during fall 2017.

In December 2020, Ryan Smith acquired the Jazz and arena from the Miller family (now Miller Sports + Entertainment).

On January 14, 2023, Delta announced it would return as naming rights sponsor under a ten-year deal effective July 1, returning to the Delta Center name.

=== Utah Mammoth arrival and renovations ===
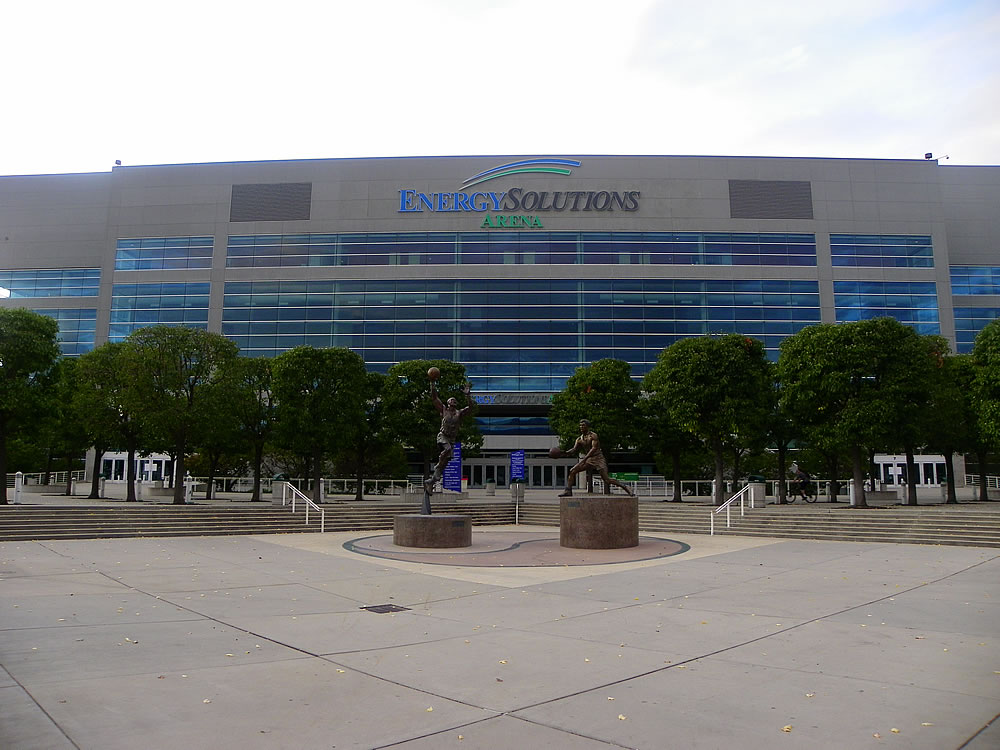
The exterior of the arena in 2009

On April 18, 2024, it was announced that Smith had acquired the hockey operations of the Arizona Coyotes, and that they would be used as the basis of a new National Hockey League (NHL) expansion team tentatively known as the Utah Hockey Club (now the Utah Mammoth) beginning in the 2024–25 NHL season. After the official announcement of the Utah Hockey Club, NHL commissioner Gary Bettman announced that the Delta Center would undergo further renovations within the next two seasons, which would increase unobstructed seats from 12,000 to 17,000 in hockey configuration.

The first regular season Utah Hockey Club game took place on October 8, 2024, with the team defeating the visiting Chicago Blackhawks 5–2. The first Mammoth playoff home game took place on April 24, 2026, with the team defeating the visiting Vegas Golden Knights 4–2.

Smith secured US$900 million in funding for renovations to Delta Center and the construction of a surrounding sports and entertainment district. The renovations — which account for US$525 million of this total — began in April 2025 and are expected to continue until October 2027.

The renovations began after the team's final home game of their inaugural season with the full reconstruction of the lower bowl: adding new risers to maintain the proximity to the playing surface and eliminate all single-goal/partial-view seats in the lower bowl in hockey configuration, lengthen the bowl on each end by 12 feet (3.7 m), and raise the playing surface by two feet (0.6 m). Renovations also included the foundational work on the new parking structure, to be used by premium season-ticket holders, installation of four new dehumidifiers to maintain ice quality year-round, adding new premium areas on the main floor, and increasing restroom capacity by 12 percent. This first phase was completed in time for the Mammoth's preseason opener on October 2, 2025.

The second phase began after the conclusion of the Mammoth’s second season on May 4, 2026, following their elimination in the Stanley Cup playoffs. This phase included, according to Smith Entertainment Group, "terrace-style ledges with full-view seating that extends the energy and feel of the lower bowl and creates a more connected and immersive experience for fans." In addition, suspended gondolas, which are featured in some NHL arenas, were added to both sidelines. The premium parking structure was also completed in this phase, which was finished prior to the Mammoth's preseason home opener on September 26, 2026, after just 143 days of construction.

The third phase, to start following the 2026–27 season, will introduce a "dynamic slope" that will connect the lower and upper bowls in the south end. Suites on that side will also be renovated then, as will continued refreshing of concourse and club areas, while expanding bathroom capacity.

A further expansion of the east-facing concourse area and plaza to allow for watch parties and other fan-centered festivities will come in the future.

== Recognition ==
The Delta Center is well known for being one of the hardest places to play for visiting teams in the NBA, as well as one of the loudest arenas in the NHL. According to an NBA Players Poll taken by Sports Illustrated on February 11, 2008, the Delta Center is considered "the most intimidating arena in the NBA" with 20% of the vote made up of 240 current NBA players. Many commentators referred to the arena as the "Decibel Center." During Game 5 of the 1997 NBA Finals, a decibel meter installed at floor level had readings of over 110 decibels, close to the noise generated by a jet takeoff. Also, during the 1997 NBA Finals, NBC's Hannah Storm called the Delta Center "one of the loudest places in sports."

== Notable events ==
=== 2002 and 2034 Winter Olympics ===
Delta Center hosted figure skating and short track speed skating during the 2002 Winter Olympics. The arena was renamed "Salt Lake Ice Center" for the duration of the Games due to sponsorship rules.

It is expected to host ice hockey during the 2034 Winter Olympics.

=== Other sports ===
The arena hosted the 1999 U.S. Figure Skating Championships.

The arena held Utah's first UFC event on August 6, 2016, for UFC Fight Night: Rodríguez vs. Caceres. The arena held its first UFC pay-per-view event on August 20, 2022, for UFC 278: Usman vs. Edwards 2. The promotion returned to the arena on July 29, 2023, for UFC 291: Poirier vs. Gaethje 2 and on October 5, 2024, for UFC 307: Pereira vs. Rountree Jr. The promotion returned on October 3, 2026, for UFC 332: Silva vs Wang.

In 1999 and 2000, the Professional Bull Riders hosted an event at the arena for the Bud Light Cup Series tour, and would later return in 2024 onwards for the Unleash the Beast Series event.

=== Professional wrestling ===
The arena has hosted various WWE television broadcasts, including Raw and SmackDown. On October 31 and November 1, 2025, the arena hosted SmackDown and an edition of Saturday Night's Main Event respectively.

=== Concerts ===
Like the Salt Palace, the arena has been modernized with each renovation to serve as Salt Lake City's largest concert venue. On October 24, 1991, Oingo Boingo became the first headlining act to play at the Delta Center.

== See also ==
- Statue of John Stockton, located outside the southeast corner of the Delta Center

Events and tenants
Preceded by Salt Palace	Home of the Utah Jazz; 1991–present	Succeeded by Current
Preceded by Franchise established	Home of the Utah Mammoth; 2024–present	Succeeded by Current
Preceded by Orlando Arena; Rocket Mortgage FieldHouse	Host of the NBA All-Star Game; 1993; 2023	Succeeded by Target Center; Gainbridge Fieldhouse
