= List of NBA single-season assists per game leaders =

NBA Statistics Page

This list exhibits the National Basketball Association's top single-season assist averages based on at least 70 games played or 400 assists. The NBA did not record assists until 1946–47 NBA season.

== List ==
^	Active NBA player
*	Inducted into the Naismith Memorial Basketball Hall of Fame
†	Not yet eligible for Hall of Fame consideration
‡	Denotes season currently ongoing in 2025–26

Statistics accurate as of the 2025–26 NBA season.

Rank	Season	Player	Team	Games	Assists	APG
1	1989–90	John Stockton*	Utah Jazz	78	1,134	14.5
2	1990–91	John Stockton* (2)	Utah Jazz	82	1,164	14.2
3	1984–85	Isiah Thomas*	Detroit Pistons	81	1,123	13.9
4	1987–88	John Stockton* (3)	Utah Jazz	82	1,128	13.8
5	1991–92	John Stockton* (4)	Utah Jazz	82	1,126	13.7
6	1988–89	John Stockton* (5)	Utah Jazz	82	1,118	13.6
7	1978–79	Kevin Porter	Detroit Pistons	82	1,099	13.4
8	1983–84	Magic Johnson*	Los Angeles Lakers	67	875	13.1
9	1988–89	Magic Johnson* (2)	Los Angeles Lakers	77	988	12.8
10	1985–86	Magic Johnson* (3)	Los Angeles Lakers	72	907	12.6
11	1993–94	John Stockton* (6)	Utah Jazz	82	1,031	12.6
12	1984–85	Magic Johnson* (4)	Los Angeles Lakers	77	968	12.6
13	1990–91	Magic Johnson* (5)	Los Angeles Lakers	79	989	12.5
14	1994–95	John Stockton* (7)	Utah Jazz	82	1,011	12.3
15	1988–89	Kevin Johnson	Phoenix Suns	81	991	12.2
16	1986–87	Magic Johnson* (6)	Los Angeles Lakers	80	977	12.2
17	1992–93	John Stockton* (8)	Utah Jazz	82	987	12.0
18	1987–88	Magic Johnson* (7)	Los Angeles Lakers	72	858	11.9
19	2020–21	Russell Westbrook^	Washington Wizards	65	763	11.7
20	2011–12	Rajon Rondo	Boston Celtics	53	620	11.7
21	2015–16	Rajon Rondo (2)	Sacramento Kings	72	839	11.7
22	2006–07	Steve Nash*	Phoenix Suns	76	884	11.6
23	2024–25	Trae Young^	Atlanta Hawks	76	880	11.6
24	2007–08	Chris Paul†	New Orleans Hornets	80	925	11.6
25	1989–90	Magic Johnson* (8)	Los Angeles Lakers	79	907	11.5

== See also ==
- National Basketball Association
