= Golden State Warriors all-time roster =

The following is a list of players, both past and current, who appeared at least in one game for the Golden State Warriors NBA franchise. Players in bold denote whose jersey number was retired by the Warriors. Current as of the end of 2025–26 NBA season.

== Players ==
G	Guard	G/F	Guard-forward	F	Forward	F/C	Forward-center	C	Center

legend
^	Denotes player who has been inducted to the Naismith Memorial Basketball Hall of Fame
*	Denotes player who has been selected for at least one All-Star Game with the Golden State Warriors and is currently on the team roster
^{+}	Denotes player who has been selected for at least one All-Star Game with the Golden State Warriors
^{x}	Denotes player who is currently on the Golden State Warriors roster
**0.0**	Denotes the Golden State Warriors statistics leader (min. 100 games played for the team for per-game statistics)

=== A ===
All-time roster
Player	Pos.	Pre-draft team	Yrs	Seasons	Statistics									Ref.
Player	Pos.	Pre-draft team	Yrs	Seasons	GP	MP	REB	AST	PTS	MPG	RPG	APG	PPG	Ref.
Tom Abernethy	F	Indiana	3	1978–1981	147	2,480	415	167	788	16.9	2.8	1.1	5.4	
Jeff Adrien	F	UConn	1	2010–2011	23	196	58	10	57	8.5	2.5	0.4	2.5	
Chuck Aleksinas	C	UConn	1	1984–1985	74	1,114	270	36	377	15.1	3.6	0.5	5.1	
Victor Alexander	F/C	Iowa State	4	1991–1995	271	5,658	1,355	251	2,502	20.9	5.0	0.9	9.2	
Steve Alford	G	Indiana	1	1988–1989	57	868	69	83	359	15.2	1.2	1.5	6.3	
Bob Allen	F	Marshall	1	1968–1969	27	232	56	10	48	8.6	2.1	0.4	1.8	
Odis Allison	F	UNLV	1	1971–1972	36	166	45	10	67	4.6	1.3	0.3	1.9	
Lou Amundson	F/C	UNLV	1	2010–2011	46	691	185	17	200	15.0	4.0	0.4	4.3	
Kyle Anderson	F	UCLA	1	2024–2025	36	541	110	81	189	15.0	3.1	2.3	5.3	
Gilbert Arenas	G	Arizona	2	2001–2003	129	4,021	518	688	2,008	31.2	4.0	5.3	15.6	
Paul Arizin^	G/F	Villanova	10	1950–1952; 1954–1962	713	24,897	6,129	1,665	16,266	38.4	8.6	2.3	22.8	
B. J. Armstrong	G	Iowa	3	1995–1998	135	3,341	265	533	1,418	24.7	2.0	3.9	10.5	
Bob Armstrong	F/C	Michigan State	1	1956–1957	19	110	39	3	28	5.8	2.1	0.2	1.5	
Hilton Armstrong	F/C	UConn	1	2013–2014	15	97	47	5	25	6.5	3.1	0.3	1.7	
Vincent Askew	G/F	Memphis	2	1990–1992	87	1,581	244	201	531	18.2	2.8	2.3	6.1	
**Al Attles^ (#16)**	G	North Carolina A&T	11	1960–1971	711	17,826	2,463	2,483	6,328	25.1	3.5	3.5	8.9	
Kelenna Azubuike	G	Kentucky	4	2006–2010	205	5,007	829	230	2,171	24.4	4.0	1.1	10.6	

=== B ===
All-time roster
Player	Pos.	Pre-draft team	Yrs	Seasons	Statistics									Ref.
Player	Pos.	Pre-draft team	Yrs	Seasons	GP	MP	REB	AST	PTS	MPG	RPG	APG	PPG	Ref.
Patrick Baldwin Jr.	F	Milwaukee	1	2022–2023	31	226	40	11	122	7.3	1.3	0.4	3.9	
Greg Ballard	F	Oregon	2	1985–1987	157	3,371	757	191	1,241	21.5	4.8	1.2	7.9	
Leandro Barbosa	G	(Brazil) Bauru	2	2014–2016	134	2,061	208	181	900	15.4	1.6	1.4	6.7	
Harrison Barnes	F	North Carolina	4	2012–2016	307	8,622	1,422	447	3,087	28.1	4.6	1.5	10.1	
Matt Barnes	F	UCLA	3	2006–2008; 2016–2017	169	3,637	765	340	1,346	21.5	4.5	2.0	8.0	
Jim Barnett	G/F	Oregon	3	1971–1974	239	6,104	727	819	2,847	25.5	3.0	3.4	11.9	
Earl Barron	C	Memphis	1	2011–2012	2	9	1	0	4	4.5	0.5	0.0	2.0	
Drew Barry	G	Georgia Tech	1	1999–2000	8	85	8	17	22	10.6	1.0	2.1	2.8	
Jon Barry	G	Georgia Tech	1	1995–1996	68	712	63	85	257	10.5	0.9	1.3	3.8	
**Rick Barry^ (#24)**	F	Miami (FL)	8	1965–1967; 1972–1978	642	24,443	4,655	3,247	16,447	38.1	7.3	5.1	25.6	
Vic Bartolome	C	Oregon State	1	1971–1972	38	165	60	3	34	4.3	1.6	0.1	0.9	
Charles Bassey^{x}	C	Western Kentucky	1	2025–2026	5	100	36	5	53	20.0	7.2	1.0	10.6	
Kenny Battle	F	Illinois	1	1991–1992	8	46	7	4	18	5.8	0.9	0.5	2.3	
Kent Bazemore	G/F	Old Dominion	3	2012–2014; 2020–2021	172	1,868	291	150	705	10.9	1.7	0.9	4.1	
Butch Beard	G	Louisville	2	1973–1975	161	4,655	705	645	1,853	28.9	4.4	4.0	11.5	
Ernie Beck	G/F	Penn	6	1953–1954; 1955–1960	361	6,972	1,168	654	2,299	19.3	3.2	1.8	6.4	
Reece Beekman	G	Virginia	1	2024–2025	2	4	1	1	2	2.0	0.5	0.5	1.0	
Hank Beenders	F/C	LIU Brooklyn	1	1947–1948	24			7	60			0.3	2.5	
Marco Belinelli	G/F	(Italy) Fortitudo Bologna	2	2007–2009	75	1,123	85	103	467	15.0	1.1	1.4	6.2	
Charlie Bell	G	Michigan State	1	2010–2011	19	171	18	13	32	9.0	0.9	0.7	1.7	
Jordan Bell	C	Oregon	3	2017–2019; 2020–2021	126	1,612	396	180	486	12.8	3.1	1.4	3.9	
Raja Bell	G	FIU	1	2009–2010	1	23	2	3	11	23.0	2.0	3.0	11.0	
Dragan Bender	F/C	(Israel) Maccabi Tel Aviv	1	2019–2020	9	195	53	19	81	21.7	5.9	2.1	9.0	
Keith Benson	C	Oakland	1	2011–2012	3	9	3	0	0	3.0	1.0	0.0	0.0	
Andris Biedriņš	C	(Latvia) BK Skonto	9	2004–2013	510	11,101	3,614	467	3,244	21.8	7.1	0.9	6.4	
Gale Bishop	F	Washington State	1	1948–1949	56			92	467			1.6	8.3	
Nemanja Bjelica	F	(Serbia) Crvena zvezda	1	2021–2022	71	1,143	294	159	433	16.1	4.1	2.2	6.1	
Uwe Blab	C	Indiana	1	1989–1990	40	481	99	24	83	12.0	2.5	0.6	2.1	
Steve Blake	G	Maryland	1	2013–2014	28	607	56	102	122	21.7	2.0	3.6	4.4	
Mookie Blaylock	G	Oklahoma	3	1999–2002	177	5,410	594	1,065	1,701	30.6	3.4	6.0	9.6	
Corie Blount	F	Cincinnati	1	2000–2001	38	918	315	51	259	24.2	8.3	1.3	6.8	
Nelson Bobb	G	Temple	4	1949–1953	227	2,478	405	488	1,052	21.2	2.4	2.1	4.6	
Muggsy Bogues	G	Wake Forest	2	1997–1999	95	2,268	204	461	524	23.9	2.1	4.9	5.5	
Andrew Bogut	C	Utah	5	2012–2016; 2018–2019	247	5,723	2,006	532	1,514	23.2	8.1	2.2	6.1	
Manute Bol	C	Bridgeport	3	1988–1990; 1994–1995	160	3,160	750	63	475	19.8	4.7	0.4	3.0	
Melvin Booker	G	Missouri	1	1996–1997	16	409	28	50	117	25.6	1.8	3.1	7.3	
Jake Bornheimer	F/C	Muhlenberg	2	1948–1950	75			53	342			0.7	4.6	
Ike Borsavage	F/C	Temple	1	1950–1951	24		24	4	64		1.0	0.2	2.7	
Chris Boucher	F	Oregon	1	2017–2018	1	1	1	0	0	1.0	1.0	0.0	0.0	
Ky Bowman	G	Boston College	1	2019–2020	45	1,015	121	131	335	22.6	2.7	2.9	7.4	
Earl Boykins	G	Eastern Michigan	1	2002–2003	68	1,321	88	221	600	19.4	1.3	3.3	8.8	
Steve Bracey	G	Tulsa	1	1974–1975	42	340	38	52	133	8.1	0.9	1.2	3.2	
Mike Bratz	G	Stanford	2	1983–1985	138	2,174	201	374	848	15.8	1.5	2.7	6.1	
J. R. Bremer	G	St. Bonaventure	1	2003–2004	5	40	3	12	8	8.0	0.6	2.4	1.6	
Tom Brennan	F	Villanova	1	1954–1955	11	52	5	2	10	4.7	0.5	0.2	0.9	
Ron Brewer	G	Arkansas	2	1982–1984	66	1,611	120	75	662	24.4	1.8	1.1	10.0	
Bill Bridges	F/C	Kansas	1	1974–1975	15	108	40	4	31	7.2	2.7	0.3	2.1	
MarShon Brooks	G/F	Providence	1	2013–2014	7	15	5	0	13	2.1	0.7	0.0	1.9	
Chucky Brown	F	NC State	1	2000–2001	6	74	18	5	24	12.3	3.0	0.8	4.0	
Kwame Brown	F	Glynn Academy (GA)	1	2011–2012	9	187	57	4	57	20.8	6.3	0.4	6.3	
Rickey Brown	F/C	Mississippi State	3	1980–1983	177	2,583	708	56	928	14.6	4.0	0.3	5.2	
Stan Brown	F	South Philadelphia HS (PA)	2	1947–1948; 1951–1952	34	141	17	10	104	9.4	1.1	0.3	3.1	
Walt Budko	F/C	Columbia	1	1951–1952	63	1,126	232	91	254	17.9	3.7	1.4	4.0	
Jud Buechler	G/F	Arizona	3	1991–1994	121	1,626	255	120	572	13.4	2.1	1.0	4.7	
Alec Burks	G	Colorado	1	2019–2020	48	1,390	226	151	773	29.0	4.7	3.1	16.1	
Scott Burrell	G/F	UConn	1	1996–1997	29	457	79	35	143	15.8	2.7	1.2	4.9	
Steve Burtt Sr.	G	Iona	1	1984–1985	47	418	28	20	197	8.9	0.6	0.4	4.2	
Jimmy Butler III^{x}	F	Marquette	2	2024–2026	68	2,162	376	363	1,298	31.8	5.5	5.3	19.1	
Will Bynum	G	Georgia Tech	1	2005–2006	15	162	165	178	54	10.8	0.8	1.3	3.6	

=== C ===
All-time roster
Player	Pos.	Pre-draft team	Yrs	Seasons	Statistics									Ref.
Player	Pos.	Pre-draft team	Yrs	Seasons	GP	MP	REB	AST	PTS	MPG	RPG	APG	PPG	Ref.
Žarko Čabarkapa	F	(Serbia and Montenegro) Budućnost	2	2004–2006	98	969	210	45	428	9.9	2.1	0.5	4.4	
Jason Caffey	F	Alabama	3	1997–2000	135	3,748	858	168	1,475	27.8	6.4	1.2	10.9	
Brian Cardinal	F	Purdue	1	2003–2004	76	1,634	317	103	733	21.5	4.2	1.4	9.6	
Rodney Carney	F	Memphis	1	2010–2011	25	331	47	11	125	13.2	1.9	0.4	5.0	
Chris Carr	G	Southern Illinois	1	1999–2000	7	74	13	3	39	10.6	1.9	0.4	5.6	
Joe Barry Carroll^{+}	F/C	Purdue	7	1980–1984; 1985–1988	491	17,429	4,068	957	9,996	35.5	8.3	1.9	20.4	
Omri Casspi	F	(Israel) Maccabi Tel Aviv	1	2017–2018	53	740	200	51	300	14.0	3.8	1.0	5.7	
Willie Cauley-Stein	C	Kentucky	1	2019–2020	41	940	255	60	323	22.9	6.2	1.5	7.9	
**Wilt Chamberlain^ (#13)**	C	Kansas	6	1959–1965	429	20,231	10,768	1,303	17,783	**47.2**	**25.1**	3.0	**41.5**	
Calbert Cheaney	G/F	Indiana	3	2003–2006	176	3,466	445	219	945	19.7	2.5	1.2	5.4	
Phil Chenier	G	California	1	1980–1981	9	82	8	7	29	9.1	0.9	0.8	3.2	
Chris Chiozza	G	Florida	1	2021–2022	34	372	36	65	67	10.9	1.1	1.9	2.0	
Marquese Chriss	F	Washington	2	2019–2021	61	1,223	378	116	561	20.0	6.2	1.9	9.2	
Robert Churchwell	G/F	Georgetown	1	1995–1996	4	20	3	1	6	5.0	0.8	0.3	1.5	
Ian Clark	G	Belmont	2	2015–2017	143	1,715	189	154	763	12.0	1.3	1.1	5.3	
Speedy Claxton	G	Hofstra	2	2003–2005	106	3,096	309	553	1,238	29.2	2.9	5.2	11.7	
Bill Closs	F/C	Rice	1	1950–1951	65		401	110	570	0.0	6.2	1.7	8.8	
John Coker	C	Boise State	1	2000–2001	6	32	5	2	2	5.3	0.8	0.3	0.3	
E. C. Coleman	F	Houston Baptist	1	1977–1978	72	1,801	376	100	464	25.0	5.2	1.4	6.4	
Bimbo Coles	G	Virginia Tech	4	1995–1999	181	4,659	417	745	1,417	25.7	2.3	4.1	7.8	
Don Collins	G/F	Washington State	1	1983–1984	61	957	129	67	440	15.7	2.1	1.1	7.2	
Yuri Collins	G	Saint Louis	1	2024–2025	2	16	3	4	2	4.0	1.5	2.0	1.0	
Ed Conlin	G/F	Fordham	2	1960–1962	147	2,257	417	208	858	15.4	2.8	1.4	5.8	
Lester Conner	G	Oregon State	4	1982–1986	272	6,660	834	1,066	2,060	24.5	3.1	3.9	7.6	
Quinn Cook	G	Duke	2	2017–2019	107	1,799	239	205	821	16.8	2.2	1.9	7.7	
Wayne Cooper	F/C	New Orleans	2	1978–1980	144	2,576	787	63	1,168	17.9	5.5	0.4	8.1	
Larry Costello	G	Niagara	2	1954–1955; 1956–1957	91	2,574	372	314	665	28.3	4.1	3.5	7.3	
John Coughran	F	California	1	1979–1980	24	160	19	12	68	6.7	0.8	0.5	2.8	
Joe Courtney	F	Southern Miss	1	1992–1993	7	70	17	2	22	10.0	2.4	0.3	3.1	
DeMarcus Cousins	F/C	Kentucky	1	2018–2019	30	771	247	107	488	25.7	8.2	3.6	16.3	
Wesley Cox	F	Louisville	2	1977–1979	74	813	206	23	342	11.0	2.8	0.3	4.6	
Jamal Crawford	G	Michigan	1	2008–2009	54	2,087	176	240	1,064	38.6	3.3	4.4	19.7	
Jordan Crawford	G	Xavier	1	2013–2014	42	661	63	57	354	15.7	1.5	1.4	8.4	
Ron Crevier	C	Boston College	1	1985–1986	1	1	0	0	0	1.0	0.0	0.0	0.0	
Austin Croshere	F	Providence	1	2007–2008	44	457	104	30	173	10.4	2.4	0.7	3.9	
Russell Cross	C	Purdue	1	1983–1984	45	354	82	22	166	7.9	1.8	0.5	3.7	
Chink Crossin	G	Penn	3	1947–1950	147			223	694			1.5	4.7	
LJ Cryer^{x}	G	Houston	1	2025–2026	18	292	28	18	148	16.2	1.6	1.0	8.2	
Terry Cummings	F	DePaul	2	1998–2000	72	1,409	362	79	638	19.6	5.0	1.1	8.9	
Vonteego Cummings	G	Pittsburgh	2	1999–2001	141	3,288	321	474	1,189	23.3	2.3	3.4	8.4	
Bill Curley	F	Boston College	2	1999–2001	39	436	79	17	124	11.2	2.0	0.4	3.2	
Seth Curry^{x}	G	Duke	1	2025–2026	10	133	12	10	71	13.3	1.2	1.0	7.1	
Stephen Curry*	G	Davidson	**17**	2009–2026	**1,069**	**36,304**	4,973	**6,743**	**26,528**	34.0	4.7	6.3	24.8	

=== D ===
All-time roster
Player	Pos.	Pre-draft team	Yrs	Seasons	Statistics									Ref.
Player	Pos.	Pre-draft team	Yrs	Seasons	GP	MP	REB	AST	PTS	MPG	RPG	APG	PPG	Ref.
Ed Dahler	F	Duquesne	1	1951–1952	14	112	22	5	35	8.0	1.6	0.4	2.5	
Howie Dallmar	F	Stanford	3	1946–1949	146			340	1,408			2.3	9.6	
Erick Dampier	C	Mississippi State	7	1997–2004	425	11,724	3,298	431	4,039	27.6	7.8	1.0	9.5	
Jermareo Davidson	F	Alabama	1	2008–2009	14	111	34	1	42	7.9	2.4	0.1	3.0	
Baron Davis	G	UCLA	4	2004–2008	227	8,376	1,005	1,845	4,567	36.9	4.4	8.1	20.1	
Dale Davis	F/C	Clemson	1	2004–2005	36	577	153	23	112	16.0	4.3	0.6	3.1	
Dwight Davis	F	Houston	2	1975–1977	105	1,418	320	75	459	13.5	3.0	0.7	4.4	
Mark Davis	G/F	Texas Tech	1	1999–2000	23	464	84	38	143	20.2	3.7	1.7	6.2	
Walt Davis	F/C	Texas A&M	5	1953–1958	299	5,057	1,311	220	1,431	16.9	4.4	0.7	4.8	
Andrew DeClercq	F/C	Florida	2	1995–1997	93	1,268	337	41	434	13.6	3.6	0.4	4.7	
Dewayne Dedmon	C	USC	1	2013–2014	4	6	0	0	1	1.5	0.0	0.0	0.3	
Vinny Del Negro	G	NC State	1	2000–2001	29	396	31	62	77	13.7	1.1	2.1	2.7	
Tony Delk	G	Kentucky	2	1997–1999	110	2,277	224	264	1,019	20.7	2.0	2.4	9.3	
Dell Demps	G	Pacific	1	1993–1994	2	11	0	1	4	5.5	0.0	0.5	2.0	
George Dempsey	G	King's	5	1954–1959	281	5,310	1,025	675	1,404	18.9	3.6	2.4	5.0	
Marcus Derrickson	F	Georgetown	1	2018–2019	11	67	13	1	46	6.1	1.2	0.1	4.2	
Derrek Dickey	F	Cincinnati	5	1973–1978	296	5,125	1,527	336	1,894	17.3	5.2	1.1	6.4	
Connie Dierking	F/C	Cincinnati	1	1964–1965	30	565	196	30	240	18.8	6.5	1.0	8.0	
Ike Diogu	F	Arizona State	2	2005–2007	86	1,253	292	34	609	14.6	3.4	0.4	7.1	
Donte DiVincenzo	G	Villanova	1	2022–2023	72	1,894	325	252	678	26.3	4.5	3.5	9.4	
Toney Douglas	G	Florida State	1	2013–2014	24	265	26	19	88	11.0	1.1	0.8	3.7	
Jeff Dowtin	G	Rhode Island	1	2021–2022	4	28	7	3	6	7.0	1.8	0.8	1.5	
Charles Dudley	G	Washington	4	1974–1978	306	5,554	997	1,098	1,756	18.2	3.3	3.6	5.7	
Terry Duerod	G	Detroit Mercy	1	1982–1983	5	49	3	5	18	9.8	0.6	1.0	3.6	
Mike Dunleavy Jr.	G/F	Duke	5	2002–2007	356	9,840	1,677	883	3,778	27.6	4.7	2.5	10.6	
Pat Dunn	G	Utah State	1	1957–1958	28	206	31	28	70	7.4	1.1	1.0	2.5	
Kevin Durant^{+}	G/F	Texas	3	2016–2019	208	7,097	1,474	1,123	5,374	34.1	7.1	5.4	25.8	
Pat Durham	F	Colorado State	1	1992–1993	5	78	14	4	21	15.6	2.8	0.8	4.2	

=== E to F ===
All-time roster
Player	Pos.	Pre-draft team	Yrs	Seasons	Statistics									Ref.
Player	Pos.	Pre-draft team	Yrs	Seasons	GP	MP	REB	AST	PTS	MPG	RPG	APG	PPG	Ref.
Mario Elie	G/F	American International	2	1990–1992	109	2,301	336	218	851	21.1	3.1	2.0	7.8	
Joe Ellis	G/F	San Francisco	8	1966–1974	524	10,374	2,686	716	4,623	19.8	5.1	1.4	8.8	
Monta Ellis	G	Lanier HS (MS)	7	2005–2012	413	14,726	1,525	1,818	8,087	35.7	3.7	4.4	19.6	
Chris Engler	C	Wyoming	2	1982–1984	100	729	201	22	161	7.3	2.0	0.2	1.6	
Ray Epps	F	Norfolk State	1	1978–1979	13	72	5	2	26	5.5	0.4	0.2	2.0	
Keith Erickson	G/F	UCLA	1	1965–1966	64	646	162	38	233	10.1	2.5	0.6	3.6	
Jacob Evans	G/F	Cincinnati	2	2018–2020	57	618	66	54	168	10.8	1.2	0.9	2.9	
Festus Ezeli	C	Vanderbilt	3	2012–2013; 2014–2016	170	2,394	725	63	712	14.1	4.3	0.4	4.2	
Phil Farbman	F	CCNY	1	1948–1949	27			18	83			0.7	3.1	
Tony Farmer	F	Nebraska	1	1999–2000	74	1,199	295	74	465	16.2	4.0	1.0	6.3	
Dave Fedor	F	Florida State	1	1962–1963	7	27	6	1	6	3.9	0.9	0.1	0.9	
Dave Feitl	C	UTEP	1	1987–1988	70	1,128	335	53	458	16.1	4.8	0.8	6.5	
Duane Ferrell	G/F	Georgia Tech	2	1997–1999	58	507	53	26	99	8.7	0.9	0.4	1.7	
Danny Finn	G	St. John's	3	1952–1955	142	3,397	548	566	1,042	23.9	3.9	4.0	7.3	
Derek Fisher	G	Little Rock	2	2004–2006	156	4,811	429	653	1,966	30.8	2.8	4.2	12.6	
Jerry Fleishman	G/F	NYU	5	1946–1950; 1952–1953	262	882	152	429	1,512	26.7	4.6	1.6	5.8	
Luis Flores	G	Manhattan	1	2004–2005	15	73	2	11	32	4.9	0.1	0.7	2.1	
Sleepy Floyd^{+}	G	Georgetown	6	1982–1988	374	12,690	1,224	2,518	6,607	33.9	3.3	6.7	17.7	
Levi Fontaine	G	Maryland Eastern Shore	1	1970–1971	35	210	15	22	134	6.0	0.4	0.6	3.8	
Danny Fortson	F	Cincinnati	3	2000–2003	100	2,642	1,070	144	1,023	26.4	10.7	1.4	10.2	
Adonal Foyle	C	Colgate	10	1997–2007	641	12,224	3,227	325	2,816	19.1	5.0	0.5	4.4	
Tellis Frank	F/C	Western Kentucky	2	1987–1989	110	1,842	391	126	741	16.7	3.6	1.1	6.7	
Wilbert Frazier	F/C	Grambling State	1	1965–1966	2	9	5	1	1	4.5	2.5	0.5	0.5	
World B. Free	G	Guilford	3	1980–1983	162	5,866	451	869	3,788	36.2	2.8	5.4	23.4	
Joe Fulks^	F/C	Murray State	8	1946–1954	489	4,490	1,379	587	8,003	23.4	5.3	1.2	16.4	
Todd Fuller	C	NC State	2	1996–1998	132	1,562	445	34	531	11.8	3.4	0.3	4.0	

=== G ===
All-time roster
Player	Pos.	Pre-draft team	Yrs	Seasons	Statistics									Ref.
Player	Pos.	Pre-draft team	Yrs	Seasons	GP	MP	REB	AST	PTS	MPG	RPG	APG	PPG	Ref.
Dan Gadzuric	C	UCLA	1	2010–2011	28	297	86	11	79	10.6	3.1	0.4	2.8	
Mike Gale	G	Elizabeth City State	1	1981–1982	75	1,793	189	261	421	23.9	2.5	3.5	5.6	
Dave Gambee	F	Oregon State	1	1969–1970	73	951	244	55	526	13.0	3.3	0.8	7.2	
Rubén Garcés	F	Providence	1	2000–2001	3	11	7	1	0	3.7	2.3	0.3	0.0	
Vern Gardner	F/C	Utah	3	1949–1952	151	507	349	245	1,339	18.8	4.0	1.6	8.9	
Winston Garland	G	Missouri State	3	1987–1990	197	5,674	666	1,091	2,246	28.8	3.4	5.5	11.4	
Chris Garner	G	Memphis	1	2000–2001	8	149	12	18	19	18.6	1.5	2.3	2.4	
Dean Garrett	C	Indiana	1	2001–2002	5	31	10	1	8	6.2	2.0	0.2	1.6	
Usman Garuba	F/C	(Spain) Real Madrid	1	2023–2024	6	18	7	1	3	3.0	1.2	0.2	0.5	
Chris Gatling	F/C	Old Dominion	5	1991–1996	311	5,488	1,584	174	2,847	17.6	5.1	0.6	9.2	
Devean George	G/F	Augsburg	1	2009–2010	45	761	114	32	242	16.9	2.5	0.7	5.4	
Jack George^{+}	G	La Salle	6	1953–1959	396	13,494	1,818	1,835	4,250	34.1	4.6	4.6	10.7	
Mickell Gladness	C	Alabama A&M	1	2011–2012	18	224	47	3	54	12.4	2.6	0.2	3.0	
Tom Gola^	G/F	La Salle	7	1955–1956; 1957–1962	421	15,671	4,171	2,069	5,710	37.2	9.9	4.9	13.6	
Joe Graboski	F/C	Roberto Clemente HS (IL)	8	1953–1961	570	16,989	4,503	1,133	6,961	29.8	7.9	2.0	12.2	
Orlando Graham	F	Auburn Montgomery	1	1988–1989	7	22	11	0	8	3.1	1.6	0.0	1.1	
Josh Grant	F	Utah	1	1993–1994	53	382	89	24	157	7.2	1.7	0.5	3.0	
Jeff Grayer	G/F	Iowa State	3	1992–1994; 1997–1998	119	2,144	352	133	888	18.0	3.0	1.1	7.5	
Draymond Green*	F	Michigan State	14	2012–2026	949	27,151	6,462	5,324	8,235	28.6	6.8	5.6	8.7	
JaMychal Green	F/C	Alabama	1	2022–2023	57	797	205	51	366	14.0	3.6	0.9	6.4	
Rickey Green	G	Michigan	1	1977–1978	76	1,098	116	149	340	14.4	1.5	2.0	4.5	
Norm Grekin	F	La Salle	1	1953–1954	1	1	0	0	0	1.0	0.0	0.0	0.0	
Tom Gugliotta	F	NC State	1	1994–1995	40	1,324	297	122	435	33.1	7.4	3.1	10.9	
Dave Gunther	F	Iowa	1	1962–1963	1	5	3	3	2	5.0	3.0	3.0	2.0	
Al Guokas	G/F	Saint Joseph's	1	1949–1950	16			10	17			0.6	1.1	
Matt Guokas Sr.	F	Saint Joseph's	1	1946–1947	47			9	82			0.2	1.7	
A. J. Guyton	G	Indiana	1	2002–2003	2	9	0	2	0	4.5	0.0	1.0	0.0	

=== H ===
All-time roster
Player	Pos.	Pre-draft team	Yrs	Seasons	Statistics									Ref.
Player	Pos.	Pre-draft team	Yrs	Seasons	GP	MP	REB	AST	PTS	MPG	RPG	APG	PPG	Ref.
Chick Halbert	C	West Texas A&M	1	1947–1948	40			30	421			0.8	10.5	
Geert Hammink	C	LSU	1	1995–1996	3	10	1	0	4	3.3	0.3	0.0	1.3	
Tim Hardaway^	G	UTEP	6	1989–1993; 1994–1996	422	15,627	1,536	3,926	8,337	37.0	3.6	**9.3**	19.8	
Al Harrington	F	St. Patrick HS (NJ)	3	2006–2009	128	3,711	737	240	1,877	29.0	5.8	1.9	14.7	
Steve Harris	G	Tulsa	1	1987–1988	44	885	105	70	452	20.1	2.4	1.6	10.3	
Joe Hassett	G	Providence	3	1980–1983	98	1,360	107	181	647	13.9	1.1	1.8	6.6	
Vernon Hatton	G	Kentucky	3	1958–1961	163	2,111	348	181	756	13.0	2.1	1.1	4.6	
Robert Hawkins	G	Illinois State	1	1975–1976	32	153	30	16	126	4.8	0.9	0.5	3.9	
Walt Hazzard	G	UCLA	1	1972–1973	46	629	78	112	208	13.7	1.7	2.4	4.5	
Cedric Henderson	F	Memphis	1	2001–2002	12	70	3	4	36	5.8	0.3	0.3	3.0	
Kevin Henderson	G	Cal State Fullerton	2	1986–1988	17	215	20	32	56	12.6	1.2	1.9	3.3	
Larry Hennessy	G	Villanova	1	1955–1956	53	444	49	46	196	8.4	0.9	0.9	3.7	
Fred Hetzel	F/C	Davidson	3	1965–1968	210	5,239	1,475	269	2,782	24.9	7.0	1.3	13.2	
Buddy Hield	G	Oklahoma	2	2024–2026	126	2,631	372	200	1,266	20.9	3.0	1.6	10.0	
Rod Higgins	F	Fresno State	7	1986–1992; 1994–1995	416	10,170	1,774	711	4,491	24.4	4.3	1.7	10.8	
Sean Higgins	G/F	Michigan	1	1992–1993	29	591	68	66	240	20.4	2.3	2.3	8.3	
Wayne Hightower	F/C	Kansas	3	1962–1965	193	4,960	1,167	222	1,940	25.7	6.0	1.2	10.1	
Gary Hill	G	Oklahoma City	2	1963–1965	76	1,103	129	109	370	14.5	1.7	1.4	4.9	
Tyrone Hill	F	Xavier	3	1990–1993	230	5,148	1,730	134	1,701	22.4	7.5	0.6	7.4	
Art Hillhouse	C	LIU Brooklyn	2	1946–1948	71			44	418			0.6	5.9	
Darnell Hillman	F/C	San Jose State	1	1979–1980	49	708	180	47	198	14.4	3.7	1.0	4.0	
Lew Hitch	F/C	Kansas State	1	1956–1957	38	577	134	25	140	15.2	3.5	0.7	3.7	
Paul Hoffman	G/F	Purdue	1	1954–1955										
Justin Holiday	F	Washington	1	2014–2015	59	657	73	48	254	11.1	1.2	0.8	4.3	
Dave Hoppen	F/C	Nebraska	1	1987–1988	36	607	167	30	211	16.9	4.6	0.8	5.9	
Al Horford^{x}	C	Florida	1	2025–2026	45	969	219	116	372	21.5	4.9	2.6	8.3	
Byron Houston	F	Oklahoma State	2	1992–1994	150	2,140	509	101	617	14.3	3.4	0.7	4.1	
Troy Hudson	G	Southern Illinois	1	2007–2008	9	93	7	9	28	10.3	0.8	1.0	3.1	
Larry Hughes	G	Saint Louis	3	1999–2002	155	5,201	711	669	2,443	33.6	4.6	4.3	15.8	
Chris Hunter	F	Michigan	1	2009–2010	60	783	167	37	270	13.1	2.8	0.6	4.5	
Geoff Huston	G	Texas Tech	1	1985–1986	82	1,208	65	342	345	14.7	0.8	4.2	4.2	

=== I to J ===
All-time roster
Player	Pos.	Pre-draft team	Yrs	Seasons	Statistics									Ref.
Player	Pos.	Pre-draft team	Yrs	Seasons	GP	MP	REB	AST	PTS	MPG	RPG	APG	PPG	Ref.
**Andre Iguodala (#9)**	G/F	Arizona	8	2013–2019; 2021–2023	452	11,755	1,732	1,530	3,137	26.0	3.8	3.4	6.9	
Jarrett Jack	G	Georgia Tech	1	2012–2013	79	2,349	243	439	1,023	29.7	3.1	5.6	12.9	
Jaren Jackson	G/F	Georgetown	1	1991–1992	5	54	10	3	26	10.8	2.0	0.6	5.2	
Jim Jackson	G	Ohio State	1	1997–1998	31	1,258	173	158	585	40.6	5.6	5.1	18.9	
Marc Jackson	C	Temple	2	2000–2002	65	1,579	404	66	717	24.3	6.2	1.0	11.0	
Stephen Jackson	G/F	Butler CC	4	2006–2010	179	6,787	783	896	3,478	37.9	4.4	5.0	19.4	
Trayce Jackson-Davis	F/C	Indiana	3	2023–2026	166	2,508	764	218	1,097	15.1	4.6	1.3	6.6	
Sam Jacobson	G/F	Minnesota	1	1999–2000	49	663	70	30	245	13.5	1.4	0.6	5.0	
Antawn Jamison	F	North Carolina	5	1998–2003	336	12,267	2,509	605	6,775	36.5	7.5	1.8	20.2	
Šarūnas Jasikevičius	G	Maryland	1	2006–2007	26	309	21	61	113	11.9	0.8	2.3	4.3	
Richard Jefferson	F	Arizona	2	2011–2013	78	1,148	160	64	375	14.7	2.1	0.8	4.8	
Charles Jenkins	G	Hofstra	2	2011–2013	98	1,184	89	198	378	12.1	0.9	2.0	3.9	
Keith Jennings	G	East Tennessee State	3	1992–1995	164	2,955	248	614	1,090	18.0	1.5	3.7	6.6	
Les Jepsen	C	Iowa	1	1990–1991	21	105	37	1	28	5.0	1.8	0.0	1.3	
Jonas Jerebko	F	(Italy) Angelico Biella	1	2018–2019	73	1,218	288	96	459	16.7	3.9	1.3	6.3	
Ty Jerome	G	Virginia	1	2022–2023	45	816	78	135	309	18.1	1.7	3.0	6.9	
Andy Johnson	G/F	Portland	3	1958–1961	221	4,579	839	447	1,833	20.7	3.8	2.0	8.3	
Avery Johnson	G	Southern	2	1993–1994; 2003–2004	128	2,969	209	544	1,102	23.2	1.6	4.3	8.6	
Charles Johnson	G	California	6	1972–1978	400	7,346	1,023	714	3,166	18.4	2.6	1.8	7.9	
George Johnson	C	Stephen F. Austin	5	1972–1977	325	5,421	2,072	256	1,429	16.7	6.4	0.8	4.4	
Lynbert Johnson	G/F	Wichita State	1	1979–1980	9	53	14	2	27	5.9	1.6	0.2	3.0	
Marques Johnson	G/F	UCLA	1	1989–1990	10	99	17	9	40	9.9	1.7	0.9	4.0	
Mickey Johnson	F	Aurora	3	1982–1985	174	4,586	1,159	468	2,403	26.4	6.7	2.7	13.8	
Steve Johnson	F/C	Oregon State	1	1990–1991	24	228	57	17	90	9.5	2.4	0.7	3.8	
Neil Johnston^	C	Ohio State	8	1951–1959	516	18,298	5,856	1,269	10,023	35.5	11.3	2.5	19.4	
Damian Jones	F/C	Vanderbilt	3	2016–2019	49	584	112	30	174	11.9	2.3	0.6	3.6	
Damon Jones	G	Houston	1	1999–2000	13	196	16	39	68	15.1	1.2	3.0	5.2	
Nick Jones	G	Oregon	2	1970–1972	146	1,661	149	158	776	11.4	1.0	1.1	5.3	
Popeye Jones	F	Murray State	1	2003–2004	5	10	1	0	0	2.0	0.2	0.0	0.0	
Shelton Jones	F	St. John's	1	1988–1989	2	13	2	2	6	6.5	1.0	1.0	3.0	
Cory Joseph	G	Texas	1	2023–2024	26	296	30	42	63	11.4	1.2	1.6	2.4	

=== K to L ===
All-time roster
Player	Pos.	Pre-draft team	Yrs	Seasons	Statistics									Ref.
Player	Pos.	Pre-draft team	Yrs	Seasons	GP	MP	REB	AST	PTS	MPG	RPG	APG	PPG	Ref.
Ralph Kaplowitz	G/F	NYU	2	1946–1948	78			32	398			0.4	5.1	
Coby Karl	G	Boise State	1	2009–2010	4	108	16	15	28	27.0	4.0	3.8	7.0	
Mike Kearns	G	Princeton	1	1954–1955	6	25	3	5	1	4.2	0.5	0.8	0.2	
Adam Keefe	F	Stanford	1	2000–2001	67	836	209	36	168	12.5	3.1	0.5	2.5	
Frank Kendrick	F	Purdue	1	1974–1975	24	121	36	6	80	5.0	1.5	0.3	3.3	
Bill Kennedy	G	Temple	1	1960–1961	7	52	8	9	12	7.4	1.1	1.3	1.7	
Larry Kenon	F	Memphis	1	1982–1983	11	121	26	5	41	11.0	2.4	0.5	3.7	
Jerome Kersey	F	Longwood	1	1995–1996	76	1,620	363	114	510	21.3	4.8	1.5	6.7	
Braxton Key	F	Virginia	1	2024–2025	3	11	2	0	3	3.7	0.7	0.0	1.0	
Bernard King^	F	Tennessee	2	1980–1982	160	5,775	1,020	569	3,604	36.1	6.4	3.6	22.5	
Jim King^{+}	G	Tulsa	4	1966–1970	170	4,525	698	599	2,044	26.6	4.1	3.5	12.0	
Kevin Knox II	F	Kentucky	1	2024–2025	14	84	17	5	46	6.0	1.2	0.4	3.3	
Bart Kofoed	G	Nebraska-Kearney	1	1990–1991	5	21	3	4	3	4.2	0.6	0.8	0.6	
Bud Koper	G	Oklahoma City	1	1964–1965	54	631	61	43	247	11.7	1.1	0.8	4.6	
Barry Kramer	G/F	NYU	1	1964–1965	33	276	59	26	102	8.4	1.8	0.8	3.1	
Frank Kudelka	G/F	Saint Mary's	1	1952–1953	20	340	45	41	83	17.0	2.3	2.1	4.2	
Jonathan Kuminga	F	G League Ignite	5	2021–2026	278	6,148	1,154	506	3,467	22.1	4.2	1.8	12.5	
Rob Kurz	F	Notre Dame	1	2008–2009	40	442	81	20	157	11.1	2.0	0.5	3.9	
Ognjen Kuzmić	C	(Spain) Axarquía	2	2013–2015	37	164	38	8	35	4.4	1.0	0.2	0.9	
Fred LaCour	G/F	San Francisco	1	1962–1963	16	171	24	19	65	10.7	1.5	1.2	4.1	
Anthony Lamb	F	Vermont	1	2022–2023	62	1,195	215	96	415	19.3	3.5	1.5	6.7	
Sean Lampley	F	California	1	2003–2004	10	63	11	2	34	6.3	1.1	0.2	3.4	
Carl Landry	F	Purdue	1	2012–2013	81	1,876	483	65	874	23.2	6.0	0.8	10.8	
Dan Langhi	F	Vanderbilt	1	2003–2004	4	17	3	0	6	4.3	0.8	0.0	1.5	
York Larese	G	North Carolina	1	1961–1962	51	646	71	85	277	12.7	1.4	1.7	5.4	
Rusty LaRue	G	Wake Forest	1	2003–2004	4	22	3	2	4	5.5	0.8	0.5	1.0	
Rudy LaRusso^{+}	F/C	Dartmouth	2	1967–1969	154	5,601	1,365	341	3,276	36.4	8.9	2.2	21.3	
Stéphane Lasme	F	UMass	1	2007–2008	1	0	0	0	0	0.0	0.0	0.0	0.0	
Dave Lattin	F/C	UTEP	1	1967–1968	44	257	104	14	97	5.8	2.4	0.3	2.2	
Acie Law	G	Texas A&M	2	2009–2011	45	698	54	77	234	15.5	1.2	1.7	5.2	
Hal Lear	G	Temple	1	1956–1957	3	14	1	1	4	4.7	0.3	0.3	1.3	
Clyde Lee^{+}	F/C	Vanderbilt	8	1966–1974	583	16,008	6,416	624	4,953	27.5	11.0	1.1	8.5	
Damion Lee	G	Louisville	4	2018–2022	201	4,133	686	282	1,619	20.6	3.4	1.4	8.1	
David Lee^{+}	F	Florida	5	2010–2015	327	10,854	3,045	906	5,454	33.2	9.3	2.8	16.7	
George Lee	G/F	Michigan	5	1962–1965; 1966–1968	148	2,072	396	105	762	14.0	2.7	0.7	5.1	
Tim Legler	G	La Salle	2	1994–1995; 1999–2000	47	655	63	51	253	13.9	1.3	1.1	5.4	
Malevy Leons^{x}	F	Bradley	1	2025–2026	25	276	53	23	83	11.0	2.1	0.9	3.3	
Bobby Lewis	G	North Carolina	3	1967–1970	176	2,451	327	311	1,014	13.9	1.9	1.8	5.8	
Fred Lewis	G/F	Eastern Kentucky	1	1949–1950	16			7	54			0.4	3.4	
Todd Lichti	G/F	Stanford	1	1993–1994	5	58	10	3	31	11.6	2.0	0.6	6.2	
Jeremy Lin	G	Harvard	1	2010–2011	29	285	34	42	76	9.8	1.2	1.4	2.6	
Alton Lister	F/C	Arizona State	4	1989–1993	126	2,059	627	114	650	16.3	5.0	0.9	5.2	
Randy Livingston	G	LSU	1	2000–2001	2	7	1	1	0	3.5	0.5	0.5	0.0	
Shaun Livingston	G	Peoria HS (IL)	5	2014–2019	367	6,429	751	889	1,990	17.5	2.0	2.4	5.4	
Ron Livingstone	C	Wyoming	2	1949–1951	101		297	193	647	0.0	4.7	1.9	6.4	
Lewis Lloyd	G/F	Drake	2	1981–1983	89	1,445	276	136	744	16.2	3.1	1.5	8.4	
Don Lofgran	F/C	San Francisco	1	1952–1953	64	1,788	339	106	472	27.9	5.3	1.7	7.4	
Kevon Looney	F/C	UCLA	10	2015–2025	599	10,309	3,391	956	2,977	17.2	5.7	1.6	5.0	
Ryan Lorthridge	G	Jackson State	1	1994–1995	37	672	71	101	272	18.2	1.9	2.7	7.4	
Jerry Lucas^	F/C	Ohio State	2	1969–1971	143	5,553	2,171	459	2,504	38.8	15.2	3.2	17.5	
John Lucas II	G	Maryland	3	1978–1981	228	7,777	621	1,828	2,889	34.1	2.7	8.0	12.7	
Ted Luckenbill	F	Houston	2	1961–1963	87	597	166	35	196	6.9	1.9	0.4	2.3	

=== M ===
All-time roster
Player	Pos.	Pre-draft team	Yrs	Seasons	Statistics									Ref.
Player	Pos.	Pre-draft team	Yrs	Seasons	GP	MP	REB	AST	PTS	MPG	RPG	APG	PPG	Ref.
Sam Mack	G/F	Houston	1	1999–2000	23	333	39	24	114	14.5	1.7	1.0	5.0	
Gerald Madkins	G	UCLA	1	1997–1998	19	243	15	45	37	12.8	0.8	2.4	1.9	
Corey Maggette	F	Duke	2	2008–2010	121	3,669	655	264	2,337	30.3	5.4	2.2	19.3	
Renaldo Major	F	Fresno State	1	2006–2007	1	27	2	0	5	27.0	2.0	0.0	5.0	
Nico Mannion	G	Arizona	1	2020–2021	30	364	46	70	123	12.1	1.5	2.3	4.1	
Pace Mannion	G	Utah	1	1983–1984	57	469	59	47	121	8.2	1.0	0.8	2.1	
Šarūnas Marčiulionis^	G	(Soviet Union) Statyba	4	1989–1993	227	5,635	644	554	3,332	24.8	2.8	2.4	14.7	
Ricky Marsh	G	Manhattan	1	1977–1978	60	851	75	90	269	14.2	1.3	1.5	4.5	
Donyell Marshall	F	UConn	6	1994–2000	340	8,938	2,305	543	3,824	26.3	6.8	1.6	11.2	
Cartier Martin	F	Kansas State	1	2009–2010	10	276	47	9	90	27.6	4.7	0.9	9.0	
Tony Massenburg	F	Maryland	1	1991–1992	7	22	12	0	16	3.1	1.7	0.0	2.3	
Bill Mayfield	F	Iowa	1	1980–1981	7	54	9	1	17	7.7	1.3	0.1	2.4	
D. J. Mbenga	C	(Belgium) Leuven Bears	1	2007–2008	16	130	31	4	19	8.1	1.9	0.3	1.2	
James Michael McAdoo	F	North Carolina	3	2014–2017	108	856	186	37	326	7.9	1.7	0.3	3.0	
Patrick McCaw	G	UNLV	2	2016–2018	128	2,035	182	158	511	15.9	1.4	1.2	4.0	
Jack McCloskey	G	Penn	1	1952–1953	1	16	3	1	6	16.0	3.0	1.0	6.0	
Ben McDonald	F	UC Irvine	3	1986–1989	155	3,426	530	227	1,000	22.1	3.4	1.5	6.5	
Hank McDowell	F/C	Memphis	2	1981–1983	44	465	130	24	135	10.6	3.0	0.5	3.1	
JaVale McGee	C	Nevada	2	2016–2018	142	1,354	413	50	782	9.5	2.9	0.4	5.5	
Dominic McGuire	F	Fresno State	1	2011–2012	64	1,127	246	110	227	17.6	3.8	1.7	3.5	
Alfonzo McKinnie	F	Green Bay	1	2018–2019	72	1,003	247	31	337	13.9	3.4	0.4	4.7	
McCoy McLemore	F/C	Drake	2	1964–1966	158	3,198	976	136	1,237	20.2	6.2	0.9	7.8	
Keith McLeod	G	Bowling Green	1	2006–2007	26	379	21	45	138	14.6	0.8	1.7	5.3	
Bob McNeill	G	Saint Joseph's	1	1961–1962	21	212	33	49	86	10.1	1.6	2.3	4.1	
Larry McNeill	F/C	Marquette	2	1976–1978	25	204	63	5	113	8.2	2.5	0.2	4.5	
Paul McPherson	G	DePaul	1	2000–2001	22	287	31	22	150	13.0	1.4	1.0	6.8	
De'Anthony Melton^{x}	G	USC	2	2024–2026	55	1,246	178	142	664	22.7	3.2	2.6	12.1	
John Mengelt	G	Auburn	1	1980–1981	2	11	0	2	0	5.5	0.0	1.0	0.0	
**Tom Meschery^{+} (#14)**	F	Saint Mary's	6	1961–1967	455	13,813	3,885	679	5,854	30.4	8.5	1.5	12.9	
Ed Mikan	F/C	DePaul	3	1950–1953	118	2,139	611	134	945	25.2	7.2	1.1	8.0	
Aaron Miles	G	Kansas	1	2005–2006	19	118	14	24	16	6.2	0.7	1.3	0.8	
Chris Mills	F	Arizona	5	1998–2003	169	4,036	693	262	1,575	23.9	4.1	1.6	9.3	
Dirk Minniefield	G	Kentucky	1	1987–1988	11	202	21	38	65	18.4	1.9	3.5	5.9	
Bill Mlkvy	F	Temple	1	1952–1953	31	608	101	62	181	19.6	3.3	2.0	5.8	
Leo Mogus	F/C	Youngstown State	2	1949–1951	121		102	131	701		1.8	1.1	5.8	
Paul Mokeski	F/C	Kansas	1	1990–1991	36	257	67	9	57	7.1	1.9	0.3	1.6	
Howie Montgomery	F	UTPA	1	1962–1963	20	364	69	21	144	18.2	3.5	1.1	7.2	
Moses Moody^{x}	G	Arkansas	5	2021–2026	315	5,769	770	325	2,515	18.3	2.4	1.0	8.0	
Jim Mooney	F	Villanova	1	1952–1953	18	529	70	35	135	29.4	3.9	1.9	7.5	
Jackie Moore	F	La Salle	3	1954–1957	131	1,155	332	65	359	8.8	2.5	0.5	2.7	
Mikki Moore	F/C	Nebraska	2	2009–2010; 2011–2012	30	524	91	41	139	17.5	3.0	1.4	4.6	
Elmore Morgenthaler	C	Boston College	1	1948–1949	20			7	42			0.4	2.1	
Anthony Morrow	G	Georgia Tech	2	2008–2010	136	3,533	458	184	1,575	26.0	3.4	1.4	11.6	
Dwayne Morton	F	Louisville	1	1994–1995	41	395	58	18	167	9.6	1.4	0.4	4.1	
Perry Moss	G	Northeastern	1	1986–1987	64	698	95	90	232	10.9	1.5	1.4	3.6	
Mychal Mulder	G	Kentucky	2	2019–2021	67	970	83	34	414	14.5	1.2	0.5	6.2	
**Chris Mullin^ (#17)**	G/F	St. John's	13	1985–1997; 2000–2001	807	28,225	3,549	3,146	16,235	35.0	4.4	3.9	20.1	
Jeff Mullins^{+}	G/F	Duke	10	1966–1976	716	23,495	3,256	2,913	12,547	32.8	4.5	4.1	17.5	
John Murphy	F	Simon Gratz HS (PA)	1	1946–1947	11			0	8				0.7	
Tod Murphy	F/C	UC Irvine	1	1993–1994	2	10	1	1	0	5.0	0.5	0.5	0.0	
Troy Murphy	F/C	Notre Dame	6	2001–2007	359	10,126	2,957	454	4,024	28.2	8.2	1.3	11.2	
Ken Murray	G/F	St. Bonaventure	1	1954–1955										
Angelo Musi	G	Temple	3	1946–1949	161			117	1,359			0.7	8.4	

=== N to P ===
All-time roster
Player	Pos.	Pre-draft team	Yrs	Seasons	Statistics									Ref.
Player	Pos.	Pre-draft team	Yrs	Seasons	GP	MP	REB	AST	PTS	MPG	RPG	APG	PPG	Ref.
Eduardo Nájera	F	Oklahoma	1	2004–2005	42	610	118	37	175	14.5	2.8	0.9	4.2	
Cotton Nash	F	Kentucky	1	1964–1965	20	190	48	9	84	9.5	2.4	0.5	4.2	
Willie Naulls	F/C	UCLA	1	1962–1963	47	1,225	315	58	518	26.1	6.7	1.2	11.0	
Ed Nealy	F	Kansas State	1	1992–1993	30	229	48	13	46	7.6	1.6	0.4	1.5	
Nemanja Nedović	G	(Lithuania) Lietuvos rytas	1	2013–2014	24	142	15	13	26	5.9	0.6	0.5	1.1	
DeMarcus Nelson	G	Duke	1	2008–2009	13	171	24	13	53	13.2	1.8	1.0	4.1	
Paul Neumann	G	Stanford	3	1964–1967	180	5,084	576	620	2,425	28.2	3.2	3.4	13.5	
Jim Nolan	C	Georgia Tech	1	1949–1950	5			4	8			0.8	1.6	
Zach Norvell Jr.	G	Gonzaga	1	2019–2020	3	36	5	3	10	12.0	1.7	1.0	3.3	
Mike Novak	F/C	Loyola (IL)	1	1949–1950	55			57	96			1.0	1.7	
Bob O'Brien	F	Pepperdine	2	1947–1949	38			9	64			0.2	1.7	
Patrick O'Bryant	C	Bradley	2	2006–2008	40	218	50	13	66	5.5	1.3	0.3	1.7	
Ralph Ogden	F	Santa Clara	1	1970–1971	32	162	32	9	42	5.1	1.0	0.3	1.3	
Dean Oliver	G	Iowa	2	2001–2003	35	232	24	44	64	6.6	0.7	1.3	1.8	
Bud Olsen	F/C	Louisville	2	1965–1967	95	914	282	50	367	9.6	3.0	0.5	3.9	
Jermaine O'Neal	F/C	Eau Claire HS (SC)	1	2013–2014	44	883	242	25	349	20.1	5.5	0.6	7.9	
Kelly Oubre Jr.	F	Kansas	1	2020–2021	55	1,687	329	73	849	30.7	6.0	1.3	15.4	
Claude Overton	G	East Central	1	1952–1953	15	182	25	15	58	12.1	1.7	1.0	3.9	
Billy Owens	G/F	Syracuse	4	1991–1994; 1999–2000	212	6,835	1,652	696	3,042	32.2	7.8	3.3	14.3	
Ray Owes	F	Arizona	1	1996–1997	57	592	163	15	177	10.4	2.9	0.3	3.1	
Zaza Pachulia	C	(Turkey) Ülkerspor	2	2016–2018	139	2,240	731	241	799	16.1	5.3	1.7	5.7	
Jeremy Pargo	G	Gonzaga	1	2019–2020	3	44	3	8	25	14.7	1.0	2.7	8.3	
Easy Parham	G/F	Texas Wesleyan	1	1950–1951	7		9	2	6		1.3	0.3	0.9	
Robert Parish^	C	Centenary	4	1976–1980	307	7,883	2,922	406	4,249	25.7	9.5	1.3	13.8	
Sonny Parker	G/F	Texas A&M	6	1976–1982	452	10,916	1,841	954	4,471	24.2	4.1	2.1	9.9	
Cherokee Parks	F/C	Duke	1	2003–2004	12	64	10	1	12	5.3	0.8	0.1	1.0	
Charlie Parsley	G	Western Kentucky	1	1949–1950	9			8	22			0.9	2.4	
Eric Paschall	F	Villanova	2	2019–2021	100	2,349	403	178	1,218	23.5	4.0	1.8	12.2	
Chris Paul	G	Wake Forest	1	2023–2024	58	1,531	225	393	533	26.4	3.9	6.8	9.2	
John Payak	G/F	Bowling Green	1	1949–1950	17			8	37			0.5	2.2	
Gary Payton II^{x}	G	Oregon State	6	2020–2026	267	4,149	851	327	1,754	15.5	3.2	1.2	6.6	
Mel Payton	G/F	Tulane	1	1951–1952	45	471	83	45	129	10.5	1.8	1.0	2.9	
Kosta Perović	C	(Serbia) Partizan	1	2007–2008	7	38	13	1	10	5.4	1.9	0.1	1.4	
Jim Petersen	F/C	Minnesota	3	1989–1992	132	1,595	405	59	494	12.1	3.1	0.4	3.7	
Jim Phelan	G	La Salle	1	1953–1954	4	33	5	2	3	8.3	1.3	0.5	0.8	
Andy Phillip^	G/F	Illinois	3	1950–1953	145	3,476	880	1,064	1,684	44.0	6.7	7.3	11.6	
Gary Phillips	G	Houston	4	1962–1966	281	6,219	796	601	2,049	22.1	2.8	2.1	7.3	
Ricky Pierce	G	Rice	1	1994–1995	27	673	64	40	338	24.9	2.4	1.5	12.5	
Mickaël Piétrus	G/F	(France) Élan Béarnais Pau-Orthez	5	2003–2008	310	6,520	1,040	264	2,669	21.0	3.4	0.9	8.6	
Gary Plummer	F/C	Boston University	1	1984–1985	66	702	134	26	250	10.6	2.0	0.4	3.8	
Brandin Podziemski^{x}	G	Santa Clara	3	2023–2026	220	6,017	1,171	797	2,562	27.4	5.3	3.6	11.6	
Ralph Polson	F/C	Whitworth	1	1952–1953	46	773	203	22	181	16.8	4.4	0.5	3.9	
Jordan Poole	G	Michigan	4	2019–2023	266	7,003	695	906	4,195	26.3	2.6	3.8	15.8	
Chris Porter	F	Auburn	1	2000–2001	51	1,147	189	61	440	22.5	3.7	1.2	8.6	
Otto Porter Jr.	F	Georgetown	1	2021–2022	63	1,396	362	94	515	22.2	5.7	1.2	8.2	
Bob Portman	F	Creighton	4	1969–1973	221	2,937	729	128	1,254	13.3	3.3	0.6	5.7	
Kristaps Porziņģis^{x}	C	(Spain) Sevilla	1	2025–2026	15	356	80	35	242	23.7	5.3	2.3	16.1	
Quinten Post^{x}	C	Boston College	2	2024–2026	109	1,845	417	150	853	16.9	3.8	1.4	7.8	
Josh Powell	F	NC State	1	2006–2007	30	289	69	18	104	9.6	2.3	0.6	3.5	
Paul Pressey	G/F	Tulsa	1	1992–1993	18	268	31	30	79	14.9	1.7	1.7	4.4	
Mark Price	G	Georgia Tech	1	1996–1997	70	1,876	179	342	793	26.8	2.6	4.9	11.3	
Kevin Pritchard	G	Kansas	1	1990–1991	62	773	65	81	243	12.5	1.0	1.3	3.9	
Roy Pugh	F/C	SMU	1	1948–1949	13			6	20			0.5	1.5	

=== Q to R ===
All-time roster
Player	Pos.	Pre-draft team	Yrs	Seasons	Statistics									Ref.
Player	Pos.	Pre-draft team	Yrs	Seasons	GP	MP	REB	AST	PTS	MPG	RPG	APG	PPG	Ref.
Lester Quiñones	G	Memphis	2	2022–2024	41	412	75	38	174	10.0	1.8	0.9	4.2	
Vladimir Radmanović	F	(Federal Republic of Yugoslavia) FMP	2	2009–2011	107	1,927	361	117	591	18.0	3.4	1.1	5.5	
Frank Radovich	F	Indiana	1	1961–1962	37	175	51	4	87	4.7	1.4	0.1	2.4	
Moe Radovich	G	Wyoming	1	1952–1953	4	33	1	8	14	8.3	0.3	2.0	3.5	
Ray Radziszewski	F	Saint Joseph's	1	1957–1958	1	6	2	1	0	6.0	2.0	1.0	0.0	
Chasson Randle	G	Stanford	1	2019–2020	3	40	2	5	5	13.3	0.7	1.7	1.7	
Anthony Randolph	F	LSU	2	2008–2010	96	1,878	578	91	883	19.6	6.0	0.9	9.2	
Clifford Ray	C	Oklahoma	7	1974–1981	549	13,427	4,310	957	3,871	24.5	7.9	1.7	7.1	
Billy Reid	G	San Francisco	1	1980–1981	59	597	60	71	190	10.1	1.0	1.2	3.2	
Will Richard^{x}	G	Florida	1	2025–2026	69	1,377	172	93	441	20.0	2.5	1.3	6.4	
Jason Richardson	G	Michigan State	6	2001–2007	438	15,539	2,363	1,394	8,008	35.5	5.4	3.2	18.3	
Micheal Ray Richardson	G/F	Montana	1	1982–1983	33	1,074	145	245	411	32.5	4.4	7.4	12.5	
Mitch Richmond^	G	Kansas State	3	1988–1991	234	8,543	1,280	795	5,301	36.5	5.5	3.4	22.7	
Anthony Roberson	G	Florida	1	2006–2007	20	227	21	10	111	11.4	1.1	0.5	5.6	
Tony Robertson	G	West Virginia	1	1978–1979	12	74	10	4	36	6.2	0.8	0.3	3.0	
Clifford Robinson	F/C	UConn	2	2003–2005	124	3,936	436	345	1,326	31.7	3.5	2.8	10.7	
Glenn Robinson III	G/F	Michigan	1	2019–2020	48	1,516	226	85	619	31.6	4.7	1.8	12.9	
Jerome Robinson	G	Boston College	1	2023–2024	22	81	6	5	31	3.7	0.3	0.2	1.4	
Larry Robinson	G/F	Centenary	1	1990–1991	24	170	23	11	56	7.1	1.0	0.5	2.3	
Nate Robinson	G	Washington	1	2011–2012	51	1,192	100	231	570	23.4	2.0	4.5	11.2	
Jack Rocker	F/C	California	1	1947–1948	9			3	17			0.3	1.9	
Guy Rodgers^	G	Temple	8	1958–1966	587	21,148	2,995	4,855	7,516	36.0	5.1	8.3	12.8	
Lou Roe	F	UMass	1	1996–1997	17	107	14	6	40	6.3	0.8	0.4	2.4	
Carlos Rogers	F/C	Tennessee State	1	1994–1995	49	1,017	278	37	438	20.8	5.7	0.8	8.9	
Marshall Rogers	G	UTPA	1	1976–1977	26	176	11	10	100	6.8	0.4	0.4	3.8	
Phil Rollins	G	Louisville	1	1958–1959	23	251	31	44	86	10.9	1.3	1.9	3.7	
Ryan Rollins	G	Toledo	1	2022–2023	12	62	12	6	23	5.2	1.0	0.5	1.9	
Lorenzo Romar	G	Washington	4	1980–1984	217	4,130	293	818	1,333	19.0	1.4	3.8	6.1	
Petey Rosenberg	G	Saint Joseph's	1	1946–1947	51			27	150			0.5	2.9	
Lennie Rosenbluth	F	North Carolina	2	1957–1959	82	578	145	29	342	7.0	1.8	0.4	4.2	
Jackson Rowe	F	Cal State Fullerton	1	2024–2025	6	52	11	4	22	8.7	1.8	0.7	3.7	
Donald Royal	F	Notre Dame	1	1996–1997	36	509	95	14	136	14.1	2.6	0.4	3.8	
Clifford Rozier	F/C	Louisville	3	1994–1997	126	2,222	657	67	632	17.6	5.2	0.5	5.0	
Guy Rucker	F/C	Iowa	1	2002–2003	3	4	1	1	0	1.3	0.3	0.3	0.0	
John Rudometkin	F	USC	1	1964–1965	22	354	92	16	132	16.1	4.2	0.7	6.0	
Joe Ruklick	F/C	Northwestern	3	1959–1962	114	909	286	48	398	8.0	2.5	0.4	3.5	
Jerry Rullo	G	Temple	3	1946–1947; 1948–1950	93			70	271			0.8	2.9	
Brandon Rush	G/F	Kansas	4	2011–2013; 2014–2016	172	3,068	474	159	983	17.8	2.8	0.9	5.7	
Cazzie Russell^{+}	G/F	Michigan	3	1971–1974	241	7,905	1,131	627	4,631	32.8	4.7	2.6	19.2	
D'Angelo Russell	G	Ohio State	1	2019–2020	33	1,060	122	206	779	32.1	3.7	6.2	23.6	

=== S ===
All-time roster
Player	Pos.	Pre-draft team	Yrs	Seasons	Statistics									Ref.
Player	Pos.	Pre-draft team	Yrs	Seasons	GP	MP	REB	AST	PTS	MPG	RPG	APG	PPG	Ref.
Ed Sadowski	C	Seton Hall	2	1948–1950	77			199	1,066			2.6	13.8	
Ken Sailors	G	Wyoming	1	1947–1948	2			0	4			0.0	2.0	
Ralph Sampson^	F/C	Virginia	2	1987–1989	90	2,044	597	162	839	22.7	6.6	1.8	9.3	
Gui Santos^{x}	F	(Brazil) Minas	3	2023–2026	147	2,349	487	253	934	16.0	3.3	1.7	6.4	
Dario Šarić	F/C	(Croatia) Cibona	1	2023–2024	64	1,098	283	144	515	17.2	4.4	2.3	8.0	
Woody Sauldsberry^{+}	F/C	Texas Southern	3	1957–1960	214	6,968	2,002	241	2,729	32.6	9.4	1.1	12.8	
Bob Schafer	G	Villanova	1	1955–1956	12	82	13	9	31	6.8	1.1	0.8	2.6	
Dale Schlueter	C	Colorado State	2	1968–1970	94	1,244	447	55	405	13.2	4.8	0.6	4.3	
Dennis Schröder	G	(Germany) Phantoms Braunschweig	1	2024–2025	24	628	56	105	254	26.2	2.3	4.4	10.6	
Ken Sears	F	Santa Clara	2	1962–1964	105	1,301	233	97	501	12.4	2.2	0.9	4.8	
Rony Seikaly	C	Syracuse	2	1994–1996	100	2,848	765	116	1,211	28.5	7.7	1.2	12.1	
George Senesky	G	Saint Joseph's	8	1946–1954	482	5,032	878	1,553	3,455	27.3	3.5	3.2	7.2	
Ansu Sesay	F	Ole Miss	1	2004–2005	16	128	38	12	49	8.0	2.4	0.8	3.1	
John Shasky	C	Minnesota	1	1989–1990	14	51	13	1	10	3.6	0.9	0.1	0.7	
Brian Shaw	G	UC Santa Barbara	1	1997–1998	39	1,028	151	173	251	26.4	3.9	4.4	6.4	
Fred Sheffield	F	Utah	1	1946–1947	22			4	74			0.2	3.4	
Purvis Short	G/F	Jackson State	9	1978–1987	614	19,230	2,976	1,709	11,894	31.3	4.8	2.8	19.4	
Gene Shue	G	Maryland	1	1954–1955	6	65	10	11	11	10.8	1.7	1.8	1.8	
Dickey Simpkins	F	Providence	1	1997–1998	19	196	46	16	54	10.3	2.4	0.8	2.8	
Alen Smailagić	F	Santa Cruz Warriors	2	2019–2021	29	223	43	17	87	7.7	1.5	0.6	3.0	
Adrian Smith	G	Kentucky	2	1969–1971	66	881	73	117	397	13.3	1.1	1.8	6.0	
Clinton Smith	F	Cleveland State	1	1986–1987	41	341	56	45	127	8.3	1.4	1.1	3.1	
Derek Smith	G/F	Louisville	1	1982–1983	27	154	38	2	59	5.7	1.4	0.1	2.2	
Ish Smith	G	Wake Forest	1	2011–2012	6	63	9	9	27	10.5	1.5	1.5	4.5	
Joe Smith	F	Maryland	3	1995–1998	211	7,552	1,734	271	3,590	35.8	8.2	1.3	17.0	
Larry Smith	F/C	Alcorn State	9	1980–1989	617	18,023	6,440	723	5,225	29.2	10.4	1.2	8.5	
Otis Smith	G/F	Jacksonville	2	1987–1989	137	2,955	547	284	1,549	21.6	4.0	2.1	11.3	
Phil Smith^{+}	G	San Francisco	6	1974–1980	430	13,508	1,506	1,666	7,343	31.4	3.5	3.9	17.1	
Mike Smrek	C	Canisius	3	1989–1992	20	135	42	2	35	6.8	2.1	0.1	1.8	
Guy Sparrow	F	Detroit Mercy	2	1958–1960	34	315	80	28	117	9.3	2.4	0.8	3.4	
Marreese Speights	F/C	Florida	3	2013–2016	227	3,021	854	165	1,811	13.3	3.8	0.7	8.0	
Omari Spellman	F	Villanova	1	2019–2020	49	886	219	47	370	18.1	4.5	1.0	7.6	
Andre Spencer	F	Northern Arizona	2	1992–1994	22	470	92	27	208	21.4	4.2	1.2	9.5	
Felton Spencer	C	Louisville	3	1996–1999	166	2,511	682	38	572	15.1	4.1	0.2	3.4	
Pat Spencer^{x}	G	Northwestern	3	2023–2026	111	1,505	208	285	578	13.6	1.9	2.6	5.2	
Latrell Sprewell^{+}	G	Alabama	6	1992–1998	400	16,009	1,725	1,862	8,032	40.0	4.3	4.7	20.1	
John Starks	G	Oklahoma State	3	1988–1989; 1998–2000	119	3,110	295	432	1,321	26.1	2.5	3.6	11.1	
Barry Stevens	G/F	Iowa State	1	1992–1993	2	6	2	0	2	3.0	1.0	0.0	1.0	
John Stroeder	F	Montana	1	1988–1989	4	20	14	3	4	5.0	3.5	0.8	1.0	
Bob Sura	G	Florida State	3	2000–2003	186	4,594	650	694	1,765	24.7	3.5	3.7	9.5	

=== T ===
All-time roster
Player	Pos.	Pre-draft team	Yrs	Seasons	Statistics									Ref.
Player	Pos.	Pre-draft team	Yrs	Seasons	GP	MP	REB	AST	PTS	MPG	RPG	APG	PPG	Ref.
Chris Taft	F	Pittsburgh	1	2005–2006	17	144	36	2	47	8.5	2.1	0.1	2.8	
Leonard Taylor	F	California	1	1989–1990	10	37	12	1	11	3.7	1.2	0.1	1.1	
Terry Teagle	G/F	Baylor	6	1984–1990	378	9,055	1,164	546	5,179	24.0	3.1	1.4	13.7	
Peter Thibeaux	F	Saint Mary's	2	1984–1986	93	992	144	45	462	10.7	1.5	0.5	5.0	
Carl Thomas	G	Eastern Michigan	1	1997–1998	10	139	10	9	62	13.9	1.0	0.9	6.2	
Jamel Thomas	F	Providence	1	1999–2000	4	27	3	4	6	6.8	0.8	1.0	1.5	
Malcolm Thomas	F	San Diego State	1	2012–2013	5	21	5	2	3	4.2	1.0	0.4	0.6	
Billy Thompson	F	Louisville	1	1991–1992	1	1	0	0	0	1.0	0.0	0.0	0.0	
Jason Thompson	F/C	Rider	1	2015–2016	28	179	54	19	60	6.4	1.9	0.7	2.1	
Klay Thompson^{+}	G/F	Washington State	11	2011–2019; 2021–2024	793	25,844	2,795	1,843	15,531	32.6	3.5	2.3	19.6	
Al Thornton	F	Florida State	1	2010–2011	22	314	57	11	131	14.3	2.6	0.5	6.0	
**Nate Thurmond^ (#42)**	F/C	Bowling Green	11	1963–1974	757	30,735	**12,771**	2,070	13,191	40.6	16.9	2.7	17.4	
Darren Tillis	F/C	Cleveland State	1	1983–1984	72	730	184	24	257	10.1	2.6	0.3	3.6	
Tom Tolbert	F/C	Arizona	3	1989–1992	167	3,028	693	155	1,206	18.1	4.1	0.9	7.2	
Anthony Tolliver	F/C	Creighton	1	2009–2010	44	1,423	319	87	539	32.3	7.3	2.0	12.3	
Irv Torgoff	F	LIU Brooklyn	1	1948–1949	13			12	35			0.9	2.7	
Óscar Torres	F	(Venezuela) Marinos de Oriente	1	2002–2003	17	109	12	3	53	6.4	0.7	0.2	3.1	
Juan Toscano-Anderson	F	Marquette	3	2019–2022	139	2,373	462	303	668	17.1	3.3	2.2	4.8	
Raymond Townsend	G	UCLA	2	1978–1980	140	1,930	144	207	710	13.8	1.0	1.5	5.1	
Nikoloz Tskitishvili	F	(Italy) Benetton Treviso	1	2004–2005	12	62	12	6	16	5.2	1.0	0.5	1.3	
Ronny Turiaf	F	Gonzaga	2	2008–2010	121	2,568	551	256	677	21.2	4.6	2.1	5.6	
Bill Turner	F	Akron	5	1967–1972	204	2,840	722	114	1,061	13.9	3.5	0.6	5.2	
Jeremy Tyler	C	San Diego HS (CA)	2	2011–2013	62	631	157	17	227	10.2	2.5	0.3	3.7	

=== U to Z ===
All-time roster
Player	Pos.	Pre-draft team	Yrs	Seasons	Statistics									Ref.
Player	Pos.	Pre-draft team	Yrs	Seasons	GP	MP	REB	AST	PTS	MPG	RPG	APG	PPG	Ref.
Ekpe Udoh	F/C	Baylor	2	2010–2012	96	1,857	328	71	446	19.3	3.4	0.7	4.6	
Kelvin Upshaw	G	Utah	1	1989–1990	23	252	28	26	128	11.0	1.2	1.1	5.6	
Nick Van Exel	G	Cincinnati	1	2003–2004	39	1,255	104	206	490	32.2	2.7	5.3	12.6	
Anderson Varejão	F/C	(Spain) Barcelona	2	2015–2017	36	278	77	25	76	7.7	2.1	0.7	2.1	
David Vaughn III	F	Memphis	1	1997–1998	22	322	102	18	114	14.6	4.6	0.8	5.2	
Peter Verhoeven	F	Fresno State	1	1985–1986	61	749	160	29	206	12.3	2.6	0.5	3.4	
Mark Wade	G	UNLV	1	1987–1988	11	123	15	34	8	11.2	1.4	3.1	0.7	
Dajuan Wagner	G	Memphis	1	2006–2007	1	7	0	1	4	7.0	0.0	1.0	4.0	
Jim Walsh	F	Stanford	1	1957–1958	10	72	15	8	20	7.2	1.5	0.8	2.0	
Paul Walther	G/F	Tennessee	1	1953–1954	64	2,067	257	220	421	32.3	4.0	3.4	6.6	
Brad Wanamaker	G	Pittsburgh	1	2020–2021	39	625	66	99	185	16.0	1.7	2.5	4.7	
Bob Warlick	G/F	Pepperdine	2	1966–1968	81	1,385	284	169	647	17.1	3.5	2.1	8.0	
Chris Washburn	C	NC State	2	1986–1988	43	471	121	19	165	11.0	2.8	0.4	3.8	
Kermit Washington	F/C	American	1	1987–1988	6	56	19	0	16	9.3	3.2	0.0	2.7	
Lindy Waters III	G	Oklahoma State	1	2024–2025	38	655	96	42	209	17.2	2.5	1.1	5.5	
C. J. Watson	G	Tennessee	3	2007–2010	174	4,039	393	421	1,515	23.2	2.3	2.4	8.7	
Clarence Weatherspoon	F	Southern Miss	1	1997–1998	31	1,035	258	49	331	33.4	8.3	1.6	10.7	
Quinndary Weatherspoon	G	Mississippi State	1	2021–2022	11	73	14	5	30	6.6	1.3	0.5	2.7	
Chris Webber^	F/C	Michigan	2	1993–1994; 2007–2008	85	2,564	726	290	1,368	30.2	8.5	3.4	16.1	
Brianté Weber	G	VCU	1	2016–2017	7	46	4	5	12	6.6	0.6	0.7	1.7	
Chris Welp	C	Washington	1	1989–1990	14	142	36	4	50	10.1	2.6	0.3	3.6	
Jiří Welsch	G	(Slovenia) Union Olimpija	1	2002–2003	37	234	28	27	61	6.3	0.8	0.7	1.6	
David West	F/C	Xavier	2	2016–2018	141	1,853	441	289	811	13.1	3.1	2.0	5.8	
Hubie White	G/F	Villanova	1	1962–1963	29	271	35	28	92	9.3	1.2	1.0	3.2	
Jo Jo White^	G	Kansas	2	1978–1980	107	2,935	253	372	1,128	27.4	2.4	3.5	10.5	
Rodney White	F	Charlotte	1	2004–2005	16	146	15	8	57	9.1	0.9	0.5	3.6	
Rudy White	G	Arizona State	1	1980–1981	4	43	0	2	22	10.8	0.0	0.5	5.5	
Tony White	G	Tennessee	1	1987–1988	35	462	28	49	218	13.2	0.8	1.4	6.2	
Jerome Whitehead	F/C	Marquette	5	1984–1989	310	5,815	1,538	137	2,125	18.8	5.0	0.4	6.9	
Andrew Wiggins^{+}	F	Kansas	6	2019–2025	307	9,502	1,431	677	5,136	31.0	4.7	2.2	16.7	
Jamaal Wilkes^	G/F	UCLA	3	1974–1977	240	7,810	1,969	561	3,968	32.5	8.2	2.3	16.5	
Brandon Williams	G	Davidson	1	1997–1998	9	140	15	3	37	15.6	1.7	0.3	4.1	
Gus Williams	G	USC	2	1975–1977	159	3,658	392	532	1,665	23.0	2.5	3.3	10.5	
Guy Williams	F	Washington State	1	1985–1986	5	25	6	0	7	5.0	1.2	0.0	1.4	
Marcus Williams	G	UConn	1	2008–2009	9	54	4	13	12	6.0	0.4	1.4	1.3	
Nate Williams	G/F	Utah State	2	1977–1979	127	2,114	321	101	1,184	16.6	2.5	0.8	9.3	
Nate Williams^{x}	G	Buffalo	1	2025–2026	14	239	30	14	112	17.1	2.1	1.0	8.0	
Reggie Williams	F	VMI	2	2009–2011	104	2,408	326	187	1,103	23.2	3.1	1.8	10.6	
Ron Williams	G	West Virginia	5	1968–1973	390	9,664	840	1,573	4,161	24.8	2.2	4.0	10.7	
Sam Williams	F	Arizona State	3	1981–1984	141	2,665	714	85	1,012	18.9	5.1	0.6	7.2	
Kevin Willis	F/C	Michigan State	1	1995–1996	28	778	218	19	315	27.8	7.8	0.7	11.3	
Bubba Wilson	G	Western Carolina	1	1979–1980	16	143	16	12	17	8.9	1.0	0.8	1.1	
Othell Wilson	G	Virginia	1	1984–1985	74	1,260	131	217	325	17.0	1.8	2.9	4.4	
John Windsor	F	Stanford	1	1963–1964	11	68	26	2	27	6.2	2.4	0.2	2.5	
James Wiseman	C	Memphis	2	2020–2021; 2022–2023	60	1,098	299	40	593	18.3	5.0	0.7	9.9	
David Wood	F	Nevada	2	1994–1996	99	1,432	257	70	450	14.5	2.6	0.7	4.5	
Mark Workman	F/C	West Virginia	1	1952–1953	60	1,001	187	36	319	16.7	3.1	0.6	5.3	
Brandan Wright	F/C	North Carolina	3	2007–2009; 2010–2011	98	1,259	297	35	557	12.8	3.0	0.4	5.7	
Chris Wright	F	Dayton	1	2011–2012	24	186	45	4	70	7.8	1.9	0.2	2.9	
Dorell Wright	G/F	South Kent School (CT)	2	2010–2012	143	4,797	709	336	1,973	33.5	5.0	2.3	13.8	
Nick Young	G/F	USC	1	2017–2018	80	1,393	125	36	581	17.4	1.6	0.5	7.3	
Tim Young	C	Stanford	1	1999–2000	25	137	35	5	54	5.5	1.4	0.2	2.2	
Ömer Yurtseven^{x}	C	Georgetown	1	2025–2026	9	104	30	8	34	11.6	3.3	0.9	3.8	
Zeke Zawoluk	F/C	St. John's	2	1953–1955	138	2,912	586	186	1,023	21.1	4.2	1.3	7.4	
