= 1980–81 Golden State Warriors season =

NBA professional basketball team season

- Head coach: Al Attles
- Arena: Oakland-Alameda County Coliseum Arena

Results
- Record: 39–43 (.476)
- Place: Division: 4th (Pacific); Conference: 7th (Western)
- Playoff finish: Did not qualify
- Stats at Basketball Reference

The 1980–81 Golden State Warriors season was the Warriors 35th season in the NBA and their 18th season in the San Francisco Bay Area.

== NBA draft ==
Round	Pick	Player	Position	Nationality	School/Club team
1	1	Joe Barry Carroll	C	United States	Purdue
1	13	Rickey Brown		United States	Mississippi State
2	24	Larry Smith	PF/C	United States	Alcorn State
2	25	Jeff Ruland	C	United States	Iona
3	49	John Virgil		United States	North Carolina
4	71	Robert Scott		United States	Alabama
5	95	Don Carlino		United States	Southern California
6	117	Neil Bresnahan		United States	Illinois
7	141	Lorenzo Romar	PG	United States	Washington
8	162	Kurt Kanaskie		United States	La Salle
9	182	Billy Reid		United States	San Francisco
10	200	Tim Higgins		United States	Nebraska-Kearney

== Roster ==
1980–81 Golden State Warriors roster
Players

Pos.	No.	Player	Height	Weight	DOB	From
C	32	Rickey Brown	6 ft 10 in (2.08 m)	215 lb (98 kg)		Mississippi State
C	2	Joe Barry Carroll	7 ft 0 in (2.13 m)	225 lb (102 kg)		Purdue
G	21	World B. Free	6 ft 2 in (1.88 m)	185 lb (84 kg)		Guilford
G	11	Joe Hassett	6 ft 5 in (1.96 m)	180 lb (82 kg)		Providence
F	30	Bernard King	6 ft 7 in (2.01 m)	205 lb (93 kg)		Tennessee
G	4	John Lucas	6 ft 3 in (1.91 m)	175 lb (79 kg)		Maryland
G	15	John Mengelt	6 ft 2 in (1.88 m)	195 lb (88 kg)		Auburn
G/F	22	Sonny Parker	6 ft 6 in (1.98 m)	200 lb (91 kg)		Texas A&M
C	44	Clifford Ray	6 ft 9 in (2.06 m)	230 lb (104 kg)		Oklahoma
G	31	Billy Reid	6 ft 5 in (1.96 m)	190 lb (86 kg)		San Francisco
G	18	Lorenzo Romar	6 ft 1 in (1.85 m)	175 lb (79 kg)		Washington
G/F	45	Purvis Short	6 ft 7 in (2.01 m)	210 lb (95 kg)		Jackson State
F	13	Larry Smith	6 ft 8 in (2.03 m)	215 lb (98 kg)		Alcorn State

Coaches
Head coach
- Al Attles (North Carolina A&T)
Assistant(s)
- Johnny Bach (Fordham)

Legend
- (DP) Unsigned draft pick
- (FA) Free agent
- (S) Suspended
- Injured

== Regular season ==
The Warriors got off to a 12–6 start thanks to their talented cast of rookies and veterans. Late in the season, they were still in a playoff hunt with a 36–34 record before losing 7 of the next 9 games as the Houston Rockets and the Kansas City Kings got red hot and passed the Warriors. Golden State still had a chance to qualify for the playoffs on the last day of the season, but a 96–92 loss in Seattle combined with the Kings' 113–104 win vs. Dallas left the Warriors as the odd team out.

Pacific Division	W	L	PCT	GB	Home	Road	Div
y-Phoenix Suns	57	25	.695	–	36–5	21–20	22–8
x-Los Angeles Lakers	54	28	.659	3.0	30–11	24–17	19–11
x-Portland Trail Blazers	45	37	.549	12.0	30–11	15–26	18–12
Golden State Warriors	39	43	.476	18.0	26–15	13–28	10–20
San Diego Clippers	36	46	.439	21.0	22–19	14–27	14–16
Seattle SuperSonics	34	48	.415	23.0	22–19	12–29	7–23

#	Western Conference				
#	Team	W	L	PCT	GB
1	c-Phoenix Suns	57	25	.695	–
2	y-San Antonio Spurs	52	30	.634	5
3	x-Los Angeles Lakers	54	28	.659	3
4	x-Portland Trail Blazers	45	37	.549	12
5	x-Kansas City Kings	40	42	.488	17
6	x-Houston Rockets	40	42	.488	17
7	Golden State Warriors	39	43	.476	18
8	Denver Nuggets	37	45	.451	20
9	San Diego Clippers	36	46	.439	21
10	Seattle SuperSonics	34	48	.415	23
11	Utah Jazz	28	54	.341	29
12	Dallas Mavericks	15	67	.183	42

Notes

- z, y – division champions
- x – clinched playoff spot

== Player statistics ==
Legend
GP	Games played	GS	Games started	MPG	Minutes per game
FG%	Field-goal percentage	3P%	3-point field-goal percentage	FT%	Free-throw percentage
RPG	Rebounds per game	APG	Assists per game	SPG	Steals per game
BPG	Blocks per game	PPG	Points per game

=== Season ===
Player	GP	GS	MPG	FG%	3P%	FT%	RPG	APG	SPG	BPG	PPG
Tom Abernethy											
Rickey Brown											
Joe Barry Carroll											
Phil Chenier											
World B. Free											
Joe Hassett											
Bernard King											
John Lucas											
Bill Mayfield											
John Mengelt											
Sonny Parker											
Clifford Ray											
Billy Reid											
Lorenzo Romar											
Purvis Short											
Larry Smith											
Rudy White											

== Awards and records ==
- Larry Smith, NBA All-Rookie Team 1st Team
- Joe Barry Carroll, NBA All-Rookie Team 1st Team

== See also ==
- 1980-81 NBA season
