= 1949–50 Philadelphia Warriors season =

Professional basketball team season (1st as NBA)

- Head coach: Edward Gottlieb
- Arena: Philadelphia Arena

Results
- Record: 26–42 (.382)
- Place: Division: 4th (Eastern)
- Playoff finish: East Division Semifinals (eliminated 0–2)
- Stats at Basketball Reference
- Radio: WPEN(Del Parkes & Matt Guokas Sr.)

The 1949–50 Philadelphia Warriors season was the fourth season for the team in the National Basketball Association (NBA).

== BAA/NBA draft ==
Round	Pick	Player	Position	Nationality	School/Club team
1	5	Vern Gardner	F/C	United States	Utah
2	–	Jim Nolan	C	United States	Georgia Tech
3	–	Nelson Bobb	G	United States	Temple

== Roster ==
Philadelphia Warriors 1949–50 roster
Players
Coaches

Pos.	#	Name	Ht.	Wt.	From
G	5	Nelson Bobb	6 ft 0 in (1.83 m)	170 lb (77 kg)		Temple
F/C	15	Jake Bornheimer	6 ft 5 in (1.96 m)	200 lb (91 kg)		Muhlenberg
G	4	Francis Crossin	6 ft 1 in (1.85 m)	165 lb (75 kg)		Penn
G/F	9	Jerry Fleishman	6 ft 2 in (1.88 m)	190 lb (86 kg)		NYU
F/C	10	Joe Fulks	6 ft 5 in (1.96 m)	190 lb (86 kg)		Murray State
F/C	12	Vern Gardner	6 ft 5 in (1.96 m)	200 lb (91 kg)		Utah
G/F	11	Al Guokas	6 ft 5 in (1.96 m)	200 lb (91 kg)		Saint Joseph's
G/F	11	Freddie Lewis	6 ft 2 in (1.88 m)	195 lb (88 kg)		Eastern Kentucky
C	6	Ron Livingstone	6 ft 10 in (2.08 m)	220 lb (100 kg)		Wyoming
F/C	18	Leo Mogus	6 ft 4 in (1.93 m)	190 lb (86 kg)		Youngstown State
C	19	Jim Nolan	6 ft 8 in (2.03 m)	210 lb (95 kg)		Georgia Tech
F/C	19	Mike Novak	6 ft 9 in (2.06 m)	219 lb (99 kg)		Loyola Chicago
G	7	Charlie Parsley	6 ft 2 in (1.88 m)	175 lb (79 kg)		Western Kentucky
G/F	11	Johnny Payak	6 ft 4 in (1.93 m)	174 lb (79 kg)		Bowling Green
G	7	Jerry Rullo	5 ft 10 in (1.78 m)	165 lb (75 kg)		Temple
C	14	Ed Sadowski	6 ft 5 in (1.96 m)	240 lb (109 kg)		Seton Hall
G	8	George Senesky	6 ft 2 in (1.88 m)	179 lb (81 kg)		Saint Joseph's

Head coach
- Edward Gottlieb

Legend
- (DP) Unsigned draft pick
- (FA) Free agent
- (S) Suspended
- Injured

== Regular season ==
=== Season standings ===
Eastern Division	W	L	PCT	GB	Home	Road	Neutral	Div
x-Syracuse Nationals	51	13	.797	–	31–1	15–12	5–0	9–1
x-New York Knicks	40	28	.588	13	19–10	18–16	3–2	20–6
x-Washington Capitols	32	36	.471	21	21–13	10–20	1–3	13–13
x-Philadelphia Warriors	26	42	.382	25	15–15	8–23	3–4	9–17
Baltimore Bullets	25	43	.368	26	16–15	8–25	1–3	8–18
Boston Celtics	22	46	.324	29	12–14	5–28	5–4	11–15

=== Game log ===
1949–50 Game log
#	Date	Opponent	Score	High points	Record
1	November 2	Minneapolis	69–81	Joe Fulks (20)	0–1
2	November 4	St. Louis	79–58	Joe Fulks (32)	1–1
3	November 5	at Rochester	53–83	Joe Fulks (14)	1–2
4	November 6	at Syracuse	72–82	Joe Fulks (26)	1–3
5	November 9	Washington	69–84	Vern Gardner (19)	1–4
6	November 11	Indianapolis	84–91	Fulks, Gardner (23)	1–5
7	November 12	vs Denver	81–63	Vern Gardner (18)	2–5
8	November 16	Boston	93–80	Joe Fulks (23)	3–5
9	November 18	Chicago	103–88	George Senesky (19)	4–5
10	November 19	at New York	69–85	George Senesky (18)	4–6
11	November 24	New York	70–75	Joe Fulks (21)	4–7
12	November 26	at Chicago	54–90	Joe Fulks (16)	4–8
13	November 27	at St. Louis	67–80	Joe Fulks (19)	4–9
14	November 29	at Denver	57–56	Joe Fulks (16)	5–9
15	December 1	at Fort Wayne	70–74	Fulks, Sadowski (18)	5–10
16	December 2	Rochester	79–82	Vern Gardner (23)	5–11
17	December 3	at Washington	63–79	Vern Gardner (18)	5–12
18	December 8	at Boston	87–91	Joe Fulks (24)	5–13
19	December 9	Chicago	80–77	Joe Fulks (27)	6–13
20	December 11	at Minneapolis	81–90	Vern Gardner (19)	6–14
21	December 13	at Chicago	65–75	Fulks, Gardner (22)	6–15
22	December 14	at Waterloo	73–70	Joe Fulks (20)	7–15
23	December 16	St. Louis	54–68	Joe Fulks (13)	7–16
24	December 17	vs Waterloo	81–72	Joe Fulks (30)	8–16
25	December 21	Baltimore	70–60	Vern Gardner (17)	9–16
26	December 25	at Baltimore	64–63	Fleishman, Senesky (14)	10–16
27	December 28	New York	72–79	Joe Fulks (20)	10–17
28	December 29	vs Syracuse	62–64	Vern Gardner (15)	10–18
29	December 31	Fort Wayne	62–65	Crossin, Gardner (12)	10–19
30	January 1	at New York	59–81	Vern Gardner (13)	10–20
31	January 6	Rochester	91–73	George Senesky (22)	11–20
32	January 7	at Rochester	68–85	Jake Bornheimer (13)	11–21
33	January 13	Washington	67–77	Fulks, Senesky (14)	11–22
34	January 14	at Washington	70–78	Leo Mogus (16)	11–23
35	January 15	at Fort Wayne	67–81	Joe Fulks (15)	11–24
36	January 16	vs Sheboygan	89–72	Joe Fulks (22)	12–24
37	January 18	Boston	94–86	Joe Fulks (20)	13–24
38	January 19	at Boston	63–86	Joe Fulks (19)	13–25
39	January 20	Minneapolis	90–89	Vern Gardner (21)	14–25
40	January 21	at Baltimore	58–68	Joe Fulks (19)	14–26
41	January 24	Fort Wayne	87–74	Joe Fulks (23)	15–26
42	January 27	Baltimore	71–74	Joe Fulks (17)	15–27
43	January 28	at New York	58–55	Vern Gardner (14)	16–27
44	February 1	Rochester	68–82	Joe Fulks (12)	16–28
45	February 3	Tri-Cities	83–72	Joe Fulks (30)	17–28
46	February 5	at Minneapolis	67–100	Leo Mogus (16)	17–29
47	February 6	at Anderson	75–77	Leo Mogus (18)	17–30
48	February 8	at Tri-Cities	94–99 (OT)	George Senesky (20)	17–31
49	February 9	at Fort Wayne	64–61	Leo Mogus (21)	18–31
50	February 10	Chicago	76–83	Vern Gardner (20)	18–32
51	February 12	at St. Louis	70–86	Vern Gardner (15)	18–33
52	February 14	at Indianapolis	67–86	Ron Livingstone (12)	18–34
53	February 15	at Sheboygan	66–61	Leo Mogus (16)	19–34
54	February 17	Fort Wayne	67–68	Joe Fulks (18)	19–35
55	February 18	at Baltimore	100–73	Leo Mogus (23)	20–35
56	February 21	New York	73–84	Vern Gardner (21)	20–36
57	February 23	vs Boston	77–82	Mogus, Senesky (16)	20–37
58	February 24	Baltimore	69–77	Joe Fulks (23)	20–38
59	February 25	at Washington	92–80	Vern Gardner (22)	21–38
60	March 1	Boston	77–64	Leo Mogus (27)	22–38
61	March 3	Minneapolis	66–61	George Senesky (14)	23–38
62	March 5	at St. Louis	67–71	Crossin, Gardner (14)	23–39
63	March 8	at Minneapolis	65–68	Leo Mogus (18)	23–40
64	March 10	St. Louis	78–73	Leo Mogus (22)	24–40
65	March 11	at Rochester	72–90	Leo Mogus (16)	24–41
66	March 12	vs Chicago	67–73	Vern Gardner (24)	24–42
67	March 15	Anderson	83–80 (OT)	Chink Crossin (19)	25–42
68	March 17	Washington	85–59	Joe Fulks (24)	26–42

== Playoffs ==
1950 playoff game log
Division Semifinals: 0–2 (home: 0–1; road: 0–1)

Game	Date	Team	Score	High points	High assists	Location	Series
1	March 22	@ Syracuse	L 76–93	Chink Crossin (20)	Al Guokas (4)	State Fair Coliseum	0–1
2	March 23	Syracuse	L 53–59	Vern Gardner (17)	Leo Mogus (4)	Philadelphia Arena	0–2

1950 schedule
