= Sonny Parker =

Sonny Parker may refer to:

- Sonny Parker (musician) (1925–1957), American jazz and blues musician
- Sonny Parker (basketball) (born 1955), American former basketball player
- Sonny Parker (rugby union) (born 1977), Welsh international rugby player
- Sonny Parker (footballer) (born 1983), English footballer who played for Bristol Rovers
