= 1950–51 Philadelphia Warriors season =

BAA professional basketball team season

- Division champions
- Head coach: Edward Gottlieb
- Arena: Philadelphia Arena

Results
- Record: 40–26 (.606)
- Place: Division: 1st (Eastern)
- Playoff finish: East Division Semifinals (eliminated 0–2)
- Stats at Basketball Reference
- Radio: WCAU

The 1950–51 Philadelphia Warriors season was the Warriors' 5th season in the NBA. One lesser known aspect of this season involved the fact that the Warriors had been involved with two failed rigged NBA games orchestrated by NBA referee Sol Levy, with Levy failing to help the Warriors win over the Baltimore Bullets on November 15 and against the New York Knicks on November 18. His failures in those matches (with him successfully rigging three out of six total games planned) later led to Levy being arrested for his crime and later be tried as an accomplice for his role in the CCNY point-shaving scandal in 1951. Another lesser known fact about this season is that the Warriors were the very last opponent that the Washington Capitols would ever face off against before folding operations in the NBA on January 9, 1951; Philadelphia saw the end of the Washington Capitols franchise with the Warriors blowing out the Capitols in Philadelphia 102–74, with the Capitols deciding to fold operations later that day and the NBA holding a dispersal draft with the Capitols' players not long afterward. Weirdly enough, the Capitols would try to continue existing for the following season afterward in the original American Basketball League as a technically new franchise of sorts there, but they would fold operations as well by that upcoming January due to the NBA issuing legal threats against the ABL and the new Capitols if they tried to take the original franchise's history away from the NBA just like how they already took the original team's name from the NBA away into the ABL.

== NBA draft ==
Round	Pick	Player	Position	Nationality	School/Club team
T	–	Paul Arizin	G/F	United States	Villanova
2	14	Ed Dahler	F	United States	Duquesne
5	50	Ike Borsavage	F/C	United States	Temple

== Roster ==
Philadelphia Warriors 1950–51 roster
Players
Coaches

Pos.	#	Name	Ht.	Wt.	From
SF	11	Paul Arizin	6 ft 4 in (1.93 m)	190 lb (86 kg)		Villanova
PG	5	Nelson Bobb	6 ft 0 in (1.83 m)	170 lb (77 kg)		Temple
F/C	19	Ike Borsavage	6 ft 8 in (2.03 m)	220 lb (100 kg)		Temple
SF	16	Bill Closs	6 ft 5 in (1.96 m)	195 lb (88 kg)		Rice
PF	10	Joe Fulks	6 ft 5 in (1.96 m)	190 lb (86 kg)		Murray State
SG	12	Vern Gardner	6 ft 5 in (1.96 m)	200 lb (91 kg)		Utah
C	6	Ron Livingstone	6 ft 10 in (2.08 m)	220 lb (100 kg)		Wyoming
C	15	Ed Mikan	6 ft 8 in (2.03 m)	230 lb (104 kg)		DePaul
F/C	18	Leo Mogus	6 ft 4 in (1.93 m)	190 lb (86 kg)		Youngstown State
G/F	14	Easy Parham	6 ft 3 in (1.91 m)	200 lb (91 kg)		Texas Wesleyan
G/F	7	Andy Phillip	6 ft 2 in (1.88 m)	195 lb (88 kg)		Illinois
PG	8	George Senesky	6 ft 2 in (1.88 m)	179 lb (81 kg)		Saint Joseph's

Head coach
- Edward Gottlieb

Legend
- (DP) Unsigned draft pick
- (FA) Free agent
- (S) Suspended
- Injured

== Regular season ==
=== Season standings ===
Eastern Division	W	L	PCT	GB	Home	Road	Neutral	Div
x-Philadelphia Warriors	40	26	.606	–	28–4	11–21	1–1	22–14
x-Boston Celtics	39	30	.565	1	25–5	10–23	4–2	21–19
x-New York Knicks	36	30	.545	4	22–5	10–25	4–0	21–15
x-Syracuse Nationals	32	34	.485	8	23–10	9–24	–	19–17
Baltimore Bullets	24	42	.364	16	20–12	4–24	0–6	12–24
Washington Capitols†	10	25	.286	30	7–12	3–12	0–1	6–12

x – clinched playoff spot

=== Game log ===
1950–51 Game log
#	Date	Opponent	Score	High points	Record
1	November 4	Boston	77–68	Joe Fulks (17)	1–0
2	November 9	Fort Wayne	87–72	Paul Arizin (26)	2–0
3	November 12	at Minneapolis	70–83	Joe Fulks (22)	2–1
4	November 14	Baltimore	84–72	Paul Arizin (24)	3–1
5	November 15	at Baltimore	72–80	Joe Fulks (20)	3–2
6	November 16	Indianapolis	84–67	Paul Arizin (20)	4–2
7	November 18	at New York	87–93	Joe Fulks (22)	4–3
8	November 21	Washington	83–78	Paul Arizin (16)	5–3
9	November 23	Rochester	89–71	Joe Fulks (24)	6–3
10	November 28	vs Boston	76–74	Paul Arizin (23)	7–3
11	November 30	Syracuse	81–78	Paul Arizin (28)	8–3
12	December 3	at Minneapolis	83–95	Joe Fulks (26)	8–4
13	December 6	at Fort Wayne	73–92	Paul Arizin (16)	8–5
14	December 7	Indianapolis	102–73	Paul Arizin (26)	9–5
15	December 9	at Baltimore	75–76	Joe Fulks (15)	9–6
16	December 10	at Rochester	84–99	Paul Arizin (19)	9–7
17	December 12	New York	101–91	Andy Phillip (24)	10–7
18	December 14	Fort Wayne	94–82	Joe Fulks (27)	11–7
19	December 16	at Washington	96–88	Joe Fulks (22)	12–7
20	December 19	Minneapolis	71–67	Joe Fulks (23)	13–7
21	December 23	at New York	79–83 (2OT)	Paul Arizin (22)	13–8
22	December 25	New York	84–86 (OT)	Paul Arizin (24)	13–9
23	December 27	New York	74–79	Arizin, Phillip (16)	13–10
24	December 28	Syracuse	91–88 (OT)	Joe Fulks (37)	14–10
25	December 31	at Minneapolis	73–83	Paul Arizin (20)	14–11
26	January 1	at Tri-Cities	92–109	Paul Arizin (19)	14–12
27	January 2	at Indianapolis	87–86 (OT)	Paul Arizin (23)	15–12
28	January 4	Baltimore	92–69	Joe Fulks (20)	16–12
29	January 6	at Baltimore	57–64	Joe Fulks (23)	16–13
30	January 9	Washington	102–74	Joe Fulks (23)	17–13
31	January 11	Rochester	82–79	Joe Fulks (30)	18–13
32	January 13	Boston	87–97	Joe Fulks (25)	18–14
33	January 14	at Boston	73–98	Arizin, Fulks, Senesky (16)	18–15
34	January 18	Indianapolis	114–80	Paul Arizin (26)	19–15
35	January 20	at Rochester	101–87	Paul Arizin (26)	20–15
36	January 21	at Syracuse	96–86	Bill Closs (18)	21–15
37	January 23	Tri-Cities	88–77	Joe Fulks (29)	22–15
38	January 25	Minneapolis	71–90	Joe Fulks (22)	22–16
39	January 26	at Indianapolis	75–78	Joe Fulks (19)	22–17
40	January 28	at Tri-Cities	96–86	Joe Fulks (25)	23–17
41	January 31	at Fort Wayne	84–91	George Senesky (20)	23–18
42	February 1	Boston	82–80 (2OT)	Joe Fulks (19)	24–18
43	February 3	at Rochester	61–65	Paul Arizin (21)	24–19
44	February 4	at Syracuse	75–78	Joe Fulks (24)	24–20
45	February 6	Tri-Cities	97–77	Joe Fulks (16)	25–20
46	February 8	Baltimore	86–75	Joe Fulks (22)	26–20
47	February 10	at Indianapolis	88–78	Arizin, Mikan (24)	27–20
48	February 11	at Tri-Cities	72–76	Paul Arizin (17)	27–21
49	February 13	Boston	104–98	Joe Fulks (30)	28–21
50	February 15	New York	93–98	Arizin, Fulks (26)	28–22
51	February 16	at Boston	76–81	Joe Fulks (18)	28–23
52	February 18	at Fort Wayne	70–75	Closs, Gardner (13)	28–24
53	February 20	Tri-Cities	99–69	Joe Fulks (19)	29–24
54	February 21	at Baltimore	83–81	George Senesky (23)	30–24
55	February 22	Rochester	98–90	Paul Arizin (25)	31–24
56	February 24	at New York	70–64	Joe Fulks (28)	32–24
57	February 25	at Boston	83–93	Arizin, Phillip (20)	32–25
58	February 27	Syracuse	86–72	Joe Fulks (28)	33–25
59	March 1	Minneapolis	97–77	Paul Arizin (22)	34–25
60	March 4	at Syracuse	79–85	Paul Arizin (21)	34–26
61	March 6	New York	96–76	Joe Fulks (23)	35–26
62	March 7	at Baltimore	95–84	Paul Arizin (20)	36–26
63	March 8	Baltimore	94–90 (2OT)	Joe Fulks (34)	37–26
64	March 11	at Syracuse	95–91	Joe Fulks (26)	38–26
65	March 15	Fort Wayne	88–78	Joe Fulks (31)	39–26
66	March 17	Syracuse	100–86	Paul Arizin (21)	40–26

== Playoffs ==
1951 playoff game log
Division Semifinals: 0–2 (home: 0–1; road: 0–1)

Game	Date	Team	Score	High points	High rebounds	High assists	Location	Series
1	March 20	Syracuse	L 89–91 (OT)	Joe Fulks (30)	Ed Mikan (16)	George Senesky (10)	Philadelphia Arena	0–1
2	March 22	@ Syracuse	L 78–90	Joe Fulks (22)	Arizin, Phillip (8)	Andy Phillip (9)	State Fair Coliseum	0–2

1951 schedule

== Awards and records ==
- Paul Arizin, NBA All-Star Game
- Joe Fulks, NBA All-Star Game
- Andy Phillip, NBA All-Star Game
- Joe Fulks, All-NBA Second Team

== See also ==
- 1950–51 NBA season
