= Billy Reid (basketball) =

American basketball player and coach

Personal information
- Born: September 10, 1957 (age 69) New York City, New York, U.S.
- Listed height: 6 ft 5 in (1.96 m)
- Listed weight: 190 lb (86 kg)

Career information
- High school: DeWitt Clinton (Bronx, New York)
- College: New Mexico (1976–1977); San Francisco (1978–1980)
- NBA draft: 1980: 9th round, 182nd overall pick
- Drafted by: Golden State Warriors
- Playing career: 1980–2000
- Position: Shooting guard
- Number: 31
- Coaching career: 2000–2009

Career history

Playing
- 1980–1981: Golden State Warriors
- 1981–1983: ? Japan/Taiwan
- 1982–1983: ? Venezuela
- 1987–1990: ABC Nantes
- 1991–1992: Reims Champagne
- 1995–1999: Avignon
- 1999–2000: Fos Ouest Provence

Coaching
- 2000–2001: Rhode Island (assistant)
- 2001–2004: San Francisco (assistant)
- 2004–2005: Stony Brook (assistant)
- 2005–2006: Laurinburg Institute
- 2006–2009: Southern Miss (DBO)
- Stats at NBA.com
- Stats at Basketball Reference

William Jennings Reid Jr. (born September 10, 1957) is an American basketball coach and former professional player. Reid was selected in the 1979 NBA draft by the Indiana Pacers and then again one year later in the 1980 NBA draft by the Golden State Warriors, and began his professional career in 1980 with the Warriors after graduating from the University of San Francisco.

== Career statistics ==
Legend
GP	Games played	GS	Games started	MPG	Minutes per game
FG%	Field goal percentage	3P%	3-point field goal percentage	FT%	Free throw percentage
RPG	Rebounds per game	APG	Assists per game	SPG	Steals per game
BPG	Blocks per game	PPG	Points per game	**Bold**	Career high

=== NBA ===
==== Regular season ====
Year	Team	GP	MPG	FG%	3P%	FT%	RPG	APG	SPG	BPG	PPG
1980–81	Golden State	59	10.1	.454	.000	.564	1.0	1.2	.6	.1	3.2
