= Bill Mayfield =

American basketball player

Personal information
- Born: October 17, 1957 (age 69) Detroit, Michigan, U.S.
- Listed height: 6 ft 7 in (2.01 m)
- Listed weight: 205 lb (93 kg)

Career information
- High school: Cass Technical (Detroit, Michigan)
- College: Iowa (1975–1979)
- NBA draft: 1979: undrafted
- Playing career: 1981–1985
- Position: Small forward
- Number: 36

Career history
- 1981: Golden State Warriors
- 1981–1985: Ginnastica Goriziana
- Stats at NBA.com
- Stats at Basketball Reference

William Henry Mayfield (born October 17, 1957) is an American former professional basketball player. Mayfield signed as an undrafted free agent with the NBA's Golden State Warriors and played in seven games during the 1980–81 season. He also played for Unione Ginnastica Goriziana in Italy between 1981 and 1985.

== Career statistics ==
Legend
GP	Games played	GS	Games started	MPG	Minutes per game
FG%	Field goal percentage	3P%	3-point field goal percentage	FT%	Free throw percentage
RPG	Rebounds per game	APG	Assists per game	SPG	Steals per game
BPG	Blocks per game	PPG	Points per game	**Bold**	Career high

=== NBA ===
==== Regular season ====
Year	Team	GP	MPG	FG%	3P%	FT%	RPG	APG	SPG	BPG	PPG
1980–81	Golden State	7	7.7	.444	–	.500	1.3	.1	.0	.1	2.4
