= Ike Borsavage =

American basketball player

Personal information
- Born: July 25, 1924 Plymouth, Pennsylvania
- Died: January 10, 2014 (aged 89) Holland, Pennsylvania
- Listed height: 6 ft 8 in (2.03 m)
- Listed weight: 220 lb (100 kg)

Career information
- College: Temple (1946–1950)
- NBA draft: 1950: 5th round, 51st overall pick
- Drafted by: Philadelphia Warriors
- Playing career: 1949–1952
- Position: Center / power forward
- Number: 19

Career history
- 1949–1950: Wilkes-Barre Barons
- 1950–1951: Philadelphia Warriors
- 1951–1952: Middletown Guards

Career NBA statistics
- Points: 64 (2.7 ppg)
- Rebounds: 24 (1.7 rpg)
- Assists: 4 (0.2 apg)
- Stats at NBA.com
- Stats at Basketball Reference

Costic Frank "Ike" Borsavage (July 25, 1924 – January 10, 2014) was an American basketball player.

He played collegiately for the Temple University.

He was selected by the Philadelphia Warriors in the 5th round of the 1950 NBA draft.

He played for the Warriors (1950–51) in the NBA for 24 games.

In 2007, he was a member of the Wrightstown borough council from the Republican Party.

== Career statistics ==
Legend
GP	Games played	GS	Games started	MPG	Minutes per game
FG%	Field goal percentage	3P%	3-point field goal percentage	FT%	Free throw percentage
RPG	Rebounds per game	APG	Assists per game	SPG	Steals per game
BPG	Blocks per game	PPG	Points per game	**Bold**	Career high

=== NBA ===
==== Regular season ====
Year	Team	GP	FG%	FT%	RPG	APG	PPG
1950–51	Philadelphia	24	.351	.667	1.0	.2	2.7
