= Vern Gardner =

American basketball player (1925–1987)

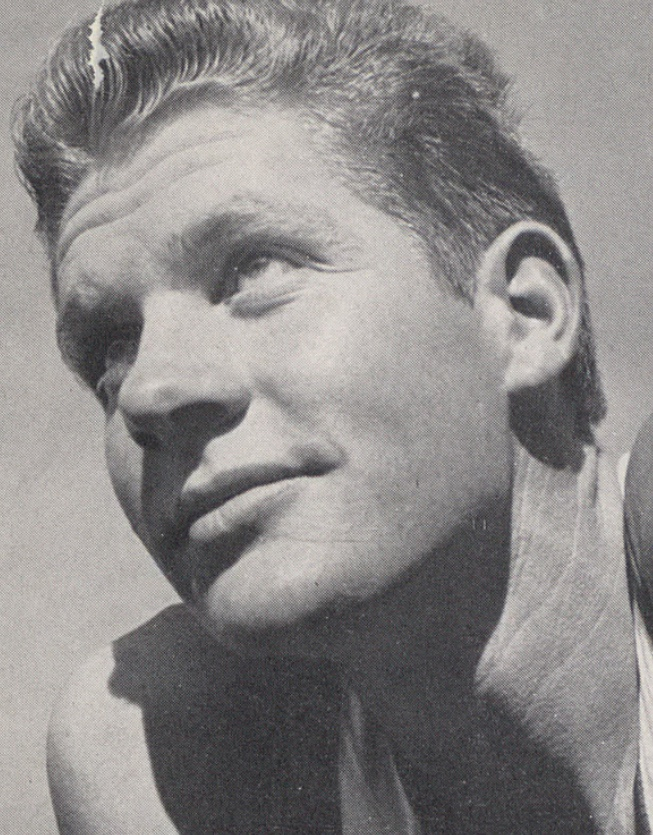
- Gardner in 1948

Personal information
- Born: May 14, 1925 Afton, Wyoming, U.S.
- Died: August 26, 1987 (aged 62) Ogden, Utah, U.S.
- Listed height: 6 ft 5 in (1.96 m)
- Listed weight: 200 lb (91 kg)

Career information
- High school: Star Valley (Afton, Wyoming)
- College: Utah (1945–1949)
- BAA draft: 1949: 1st round, 5th overall pick
- Drafted by: Philadelphia Warriors
- Playing career: 1949–1952
- Position: Power forward / center
- Number: 12

Career history
- 1949–1952: Philadelphia Warriors

Career highlights
- 2× Consensus second-team All-American (1947, 1949); Third-team All-American – Converse (1948); No. 33 retired by Utah Utes

Career NBA statistics
- Points: 1,339 (8.9 ppg)
- Rebounds: 349 (4.0 rpg)
- Assists: 245 (1.6 apg)
- Stats at NBA.com
- Stats at Basketball Reference

Vernon B. Gardner (May 14, 1925 – August 26, 1987) was an American basketball player. He was a two-time consensus All-American at the University of Utah and played three seasons with the Philadelphia Warriors.

Vern Gardner was a 6'5 forward/center who played at Star Valley High School in Afton, Wyoming and played collegiately at the University of Utah, where he was a second team consensus All-American in 1947 and 1949. Gardner led the Utes to the NIT championship in 1947, at a time when this tournament was considered as prestigious as the NCAA Tournament is today. Gardner was named tournament MVP. His number 33 was retired by the University of Utah.

After the completion of his college career, Gardner was selected in the first round of the 1949 BAA draft by the Philadelphia Warriors. Gardner played three seasons for the Warriors, averaging 8.9 points per game over his career.

Following his retirement from the BAA, Gardner became a high school coach and teacher, first at his alma mater Star Valley High, then at Bonneville High School in Ogden, Utah. Gardner died of a stroke on August 26, 1987.

== Career statistics ==
Legend
GP	Games played	GS	Games started	MPG	Minutes per game
FG%	Field goal percentage	3P%	3-point field goal percentage	FT%	Free throw percentage
RPG	Rebounds per game	APG	Assists per game	SPG	Steals per game
BPG	Blocks per game	PPG	Points per game	**Bold**	Career high

=== NBA ===
==== Regular season ====
Year	Team	GP	MPG	FG%	FT%	RPG	APG	PPG
1949–50	Philadelphia	**63**	–	.342	**.767**	–	**1.9**	**13.5**
1950–51	Philadelphia	61	–	.337	.711	3.9	1.5	5.4
1951–52	Philadelphia	27	18.8	**.371**	.652	**4.1**	1.4	5.9
Career		151	18.8	.344	.748	4.0	1.6	8.9

==== Playoffs ====
Year	Team	GP	MPG	FG%	FT%	RPG	APG	PPG
1950	Philadelphia	2	–	.341	.667	–	**1.0**	**18.0**
1951	Philadelphia	2	–	**.500**	**1.000**	2.0	.0	5.0
1952	Philadelphia	**3**	25.7	.368	.909	**4.7**	**1.0**	8.0
Career		7	25.7	.366	.826	3.6	.7	10.1
