= Charlie Parsley =

American basketball player

Personal information
- Born: October 13, 1925 London, Kentucky, U.S.
- Died: October 3, 1997 (aged 71) Las Vegas, Nevada, U.S.
- Listed height: 6 ft 2 in (1.88 m)
- Listed weight: 175 lb (79 kg)

Career information
- College: Western Kentucky (1945–1949)
- BAA draft: 1949: undrafted
- Position: Guard
- Number: 7
- Coaching career: 1958–1970

Career history

Playing
- 1949–1950: Philadelphia Warriors

Coaching
- 1958–1970: Southeast Missouri State
- 1970–1973: Milwaukee
- Stats at NBA.com
- Stats at Basketball Reference

Charles Henry Parsley (October 13, 1925 – October 3, 1997) was an American professional basketball player and college coach who spent one season in the National Basketball Association (NBA) as a member of the Philadelphia Warriors (1949–50). He attended Western Kentucky University.

After his playing career, Parsley became a college coach. He was head coach at Southeast Missouri State University and the University of Wisconsin–Milwaukee.

== Career statistics ==
Legend
GP	Games played	GS	Games started	MPG	Minutes per game
FG%	Field goal percentage	3P%	3-point field goal percentage	FT%	Free throw percentage
RPG	Rebounds per game	APG	Assists per game	SPG	Steals per game
BPG	Blocks per game	PPG	Points per game	**Bold**	Career high

=== NBA ===
==== Regular season ====
Year	Team	GP	FG%	FT%	APG	PPG
1949–50	Philadelphia	9	.258	.857	.9	2.4
