= Nelson Bobb =

American basketball player (1924–2003)

Personal information
- Born: February 25, 1924 Philadelphia, Pennsylvania, U.S.
- Died: December 8, 2003 (aged 79) Irvine, California, U.S.
- Listed height: 6 ft 0 in (1.83 m)
- Listed weight: 170 lb (77 kg)

Career information
- High school: West Philadelphia (Philadelphia, Pennsylvania)
- College: Temple (1942–1943, 1946–1949)
- NBA draft: 1949: 3rd round
- Drafted by: Philadelphia Warriors
- Playing career: 1949–1953
- Position: Point guard
- Number: 5

Career history
- 1949–1953: Philadelphia Warriors

Career statistics
- Points: 1,052 (4.6 ppg)
- Rebounds: 405 (2.4 rpg)
- Assists: 488 (2.1 apg)
- Stats at NBA.com
- Stats at Basketball Reference

Nelson S. "Nitzy" Bobb (February 25, 1924 – December 8, 2003) was an American basketball player.

== Early life ==
Born and raised in Philadelphia, he played collegiately for hometown Temple University.

== NBA career ==
He was selected by the Philadelphia Warriors in the 1949 BAA draft and the Syracuse Nationals in the 1949 NBL draft.

He played for the Warriors (1949–53) in the National Basketball Association (NBA) for 227 games.

== Halls of Fame ==
Bobb is an inductee of the Philadelphia Jewish Sports Hall of Fame

== Death ==
Bobb died December 8, 2003 in Irvine, California at the age of 79.

== Career statistics ==
Legend
GP	Games played	GS	Games started	MPG	Minutes per game
FG%	Field goal percentage	3P%	3-point field goal percentage	FT%	Free throw percentage
RPG	Rebounds per game	APG	Assists per game	SPG	Steals per game
BPG	Blocks per game	PPG	Points per game	**Bold**	Career high

=== NBA ===
==== Regular season ====
Year	Team	GP	MPG	FG%	FT%	RPG	APG	PPG
1949–50	Philadelphia	57	–	.323	.626	–	.8	4.2
1950–51	Philadelphia	53	–	.329	.557	1.9	1.5	2.8
1951–52	Philadelphia	**62**	19.2	.359	.593	2.4	2.7	5.1
1952–53	Philadelphia	55	**23.4**	**.374**	**.648**	**2.9**	**3.5**	**6.2**
Career		227	21.2	.350	.612	2.4	2.1	4.6

==== Playoffs ====
Year	Team	GP	MPG	FG%	FT%	RPG	APG	PPG
1950	Philadelphia	2	–	**.333**	–	–	.5	1.0
1951	Philadelphia	1	–	–	–	.0	**2.0**	.0
1952	Philadelphia	**3**	**9.7**	**.333**	**.400**	**.7**	.3	**1.3**
Career		6	9.7	.333	.400	.5	.7	1.0
