= Jim Nolan (basketball) =

American basketball player (1927–1983)

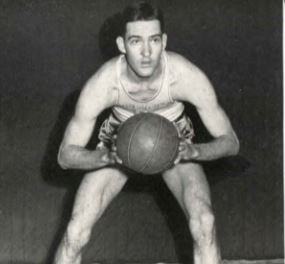
- Nolan as a junior at Georgia Tech

Personal information
- Born: June 9, 1927 Macon, Georgia, U.S.
- Died: April 19, 1983 (aged 57) Macon, Georgia, U.S.
- Listed height: 6 ft 8 in (2.03 m)
- Listed weight: 210 lb (95 kg)

Career information
- High school: Lanier (Macon, Georgia)
- College: Georgia Tech (1946–1949)
- BAA draft: 1949: 2nd round
- Drafted by: Philadelphia Warriors
- Playing career: 1949–1950
- Position: Center
- Number: 19

Career history
- 1949–1950: Philadelphia Warriors

Career highlights
- Second-team All-SEC (1949)

Career NBA statistics
- Points: 8 (1.6 ppg)
- Assists: 4 (0.8 apg)
- Stats at NBA.com
- Stats at Basketball Reference

James S. Nolan (June 9, 1927 – April 19, 1983) was an American professional basketball player. Nolan was selected in the second round of the 1949 BAA draft by the Philadelphia Warriors. He played for the Warriors for five games in the 1949–50 NBA season and recorded totals of eight points and four assists. He played college basketball and football at Georgia Institute of Technology. He later returned to Georgia and started a coaching career leading the Tech Freshman Basketball team from 1955 to 1957, then became the Lanier football coach in the early 1960s. He is a member of Georgia Sports Hall of Fame and the Georgia Tech Athletic Hall of Fame.

== Career statistics ==
Legend
GP	Games played	GS	Games started	MPG	Minutes per game
FG%	Field goal percentage	3P%	3-point field goal percentage	FT%	Free throw percentage
RPG	Rebounds per game	APG	Assists per game	SPG	Steals per game
BPG	Blocks per game	PPG	Points per game	**Bold**	Career high

=== NBA ===
==== Regular season ====
Year	Team	GP	FG%	FT%	APG	PPG
1949–50	Philadelphia	5	.190	–	.8	1.6
