= Jake Bornheimer =

American basketball player (1927–1986)

Personal information
- Born: June 9, 1927 New Brunswick, New Jersey
- Died: September 10, 1986 (aged 59)
- Listed height: 6 ft 5 in (1.96 m)
- Listed weight: 200 lb (91 kg)

Career information
- High school: St. Peter the Apostle (New Brunswick, New Jersey)
- College: Muhlenberg (1946–1947)
- BAA draft: 1947: undrafted
- Playing career: 1948–1950
- Position: Forward / center
- Number: 15

Career history
- 1948–1950: Philadelphia Warriors
- Stats at NBA.com
- Stats at Basketball Reference

Jacob Nicholas Bornheimer (June 29, 1927 – September 10, 1986) was an American professional basketball player.

Born in New Brunswick, New Jersey, Bornheimer played prep basketball for St. Peter the Apostle High School and collegiately for the Muhlenberg College.

He played for the Philadelphia Warriors (1948–50) in the NBA for 75 games. His older brother, Bill, played basketball at Georgetown, from 1940 to 1942.

== BAA/NBA career statistics ==
Legend
GP	Games played	FG%	Field-goal percentage
FT%	Free-throw percentage	APG	Assists per game
PPG	Points per game	**Bold**	Career high

=== Regular season ===
Year	Team	GP	FG%	FT%	APG	PPG
1948–49	Philadelphia	15	**.312**	**.690**	**.9**	**5.9**
1949–50	Philadelphia	**60**	.289	.667	.7	4.2
Career		75	.295	.671	.7	4.6

=== Playoffs ===
Year	Team	GP	FG%	FT%	APG	PPG
1949	Philadelphia	**2**	**.412**	**.667**	**1.0**	**10.0**
1950	Philadelphia	**2**	.333	.000	.0	1.0
Career		4	.400	.667	.5	5.5
