= Leo Mogus =

American basketball player (1921–1971)

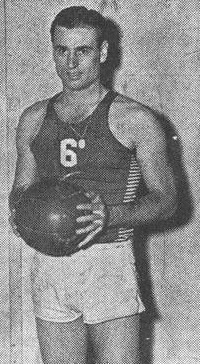

Personal information
- Born: April 13, 1921 Ohio, U.S.
- Died: May 31, 1971 (aged 50) Los Angeles, California, U.S.
- Listed height: 6 ft 4 in (1.93 m)
- Listed weight: 190 lb (86 kg)

Career information
- High school: Scienceville (Youngstown, Ohio)
- College: Youngstown State (1939–1943)
- Playing career: 1946–1951
- Position: Power forward / center
- Number: 7, 22, 14, 29, 44, 18

Career history
- 1946: Cleveland Rebels
- 1946–1947: Toronto Huskies
- 1947–1948: Youngstown Cubs
- 1948: Baltimore Bullets
- 1948–1949: Fort Wayne Pistons
- 1949: Indianapolis Jets
- 1949–1951: Philadelphia Warriors
- Stats at NBA.com
- Stats at Basketball Reference

Leo John Mogus (April 13, 1921 – May 31, 1971) was an American professional basketball player.

A 6'4" power forward/center, Mogus played at Youngstown State University from 1939 to 1943, where he scored 1,400 points. Mogus also played football at the school. After college, he played professional basketball in the Basketball Association of America (later National Basketball Association) as a member of the Cleveland Rebels, Toronto Huskies, Baltimore Bullets, Fort Wayne Pistons, Indianapolis Jets, and Philadelphia Warriors. He averaged 8.5 points per game in his BAA/NBA career, and during the 1946–47 BAA season, he ranked ninth in the league in total points (753), ninth in points per game (13.0), seventh in total assists (84), and ninth in assists per game (1.4).

Mogus was the first player in BAA/NBA history to record a 33-point game (November 19, 1946 vs. the Toronto Huskies). To date, Mogus is the only player from Youngstown State University to play in the NBA. He was inducted into the school's Hall of Fame in 1985.

== BAA/NBA career statistics ==
Legend
GP	Games played	FG%	Field-goal percentage
FT%	Free-throw percentage	RPG	Rebounds per game
APG	Assists per game	PPG	Points per game
**Bold**	Career high

=== Regular season ===
Year	Team	GP	FG%	FT%	RPG	APG	PPG
1946–47	Cleveland	17	.323	.716	–	1.6	12.3
1946–47	Toronto	41	.285	.726	–	1.4	13.3
1948–49	Baltimore	13	.200	.694	–	.2	3.5
1948–49	Fort Wayne	20	.335	**.743**	–	1.4	8.7
1948–49	Indianapolis	19	.364	.729	–	**3.9**	**15.9**
1949–50	Philadelphia	**64**	**.396**	.727	–	1.5	8.8
1950–51	Philadelphia	57	.352	.616	**1.8**	.6	2.4
Career		231	.332	.716	1.8	1.4	8.5

=== Playoffs ===
Year	Team	GP	FG%	FT%	RPG	APG	PPG
1950	Philadelphia	**2**	**.167**	**.571**	–	**3.5**	**5.0**
1951	Philadelphia	1	.000	.000	.0	.0	.0
Career		3	.167	.571	.0	2.3	3.3
