= Ron Livingstone =

American basketball player (1925–1991)

Personal information
- Born: October 9, 1925 Oakland, California, U.S.
- Died: August 26, 1991 (aged 65)
- Listed height: 6 ft 10 in (2.08 m)
- Listed weight: 220 lb (100 kg)

Career information
- High school: Oakland (Oakland, California)
- College: Modesto JC (1944–1946); Saint Mary's (1946–1947); Wyoming (1948–1949)
- BAA draft: 1949: 1st round, 6th overall pick
- Drafted by: Baltimore Bullets
- Playing career: 1947–1951
- Position: Center
- Number: 17, 6

Career history
- 1947–1948: Denver Nuggets
- 1949: Baltimore Bullets
- 1949–1951: Philadelphia Warriors
- Stats at NBA.com
- Stats at Basketball Reference

George Ronald Livingstone (October 9, 1925 – August 26, 1991) was an American professional basketball player. Livingstone was the sixth overall pick in the 1949 BAA draft by the Baltimore Bullets. He played for the Bullets for just sixteen games in his rookie season before he was traded to the Philadelphia Warriors for Ed Sadowski and cash. He played for the Warriors until 1951. Prior to the professional leagues, Livingstone was an AAU All-American while playing for the Oakland Bittners in 1946–47.

== NBA career statistics ==
Legend
GP	Games played	FG%	Field-goal percentage
FT%	Free-throw percentage	RPG	Rebounds per game
APG	Assists per game	PPG	Points per game
**Bold**	Career high

=== Regular season ===
Year	Team	GP	FG%	FT%	RPG	APG	PPG
1949–50	Baltimore	16	.245	**.761**	–	1.5	5.3
1949–50	Philadelphia	38	.289	.664	–	**3.1**	**9.6**
1950–51	Philadelphia	**63**	**.295**	.697	**4.7**	1.2	4.5
Career		117	.286	.692	4.7	1.9	6.3

=== Playoffs ===
Year	Team	GP	FG%	FT%	RPG	APG	PPG
1950	Philadelphia	**2**	.375	**.571**	–	**2.5**	**8.0**
1951	Philadelphia	**2**	**.667**	.000	**1.0**	.0	2.0
Career		4	.421	.571	1.0	1.3	5.0
