= George Senesky =

American basketball player and coach (1922–2001)

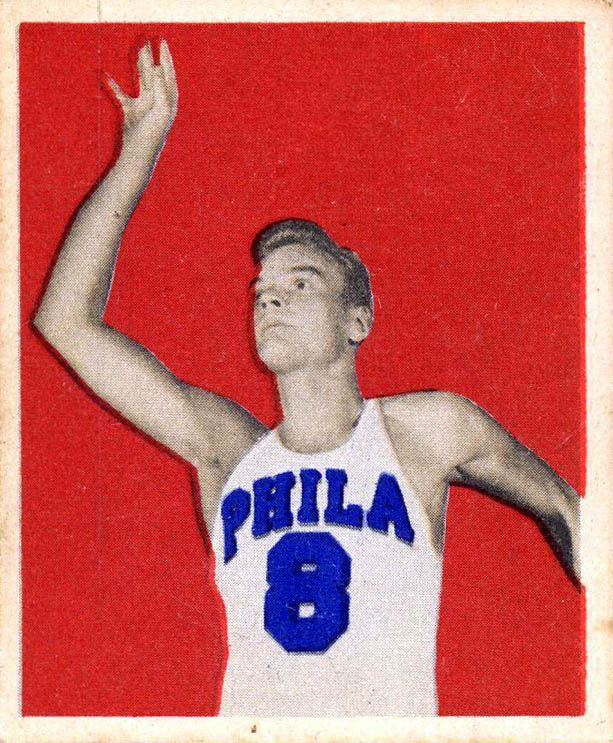
- Senesky in 1948

Personal information
- Born: April 4, 1922 Mahanoy City, Pennsylvania, U.S.
- Died: June 25, 2001 (aged 79) Cape May Court House, New Jersey, U.S.
- Listed height: 6 ft 2 in (1.88 m)
- Listed weight: 179 lb (81 kg)

Career information
- High school: Mahanoy (Mahanoy City, Pennsylvania)
- College: Saint Joseph's (1940–1943)
- Playing career: 1945–1954
- Position: Point guard
- Number: 8
- Coaching career: 1955–1958

Career history

Playing
- 1945–1946: Philadelphia Sphas
- 1946–1954: Philadelphia Warriors

Coaching
- 1955–1958: Philadelphia Warriors

Career highlights
- As player: BAA champion (1947); Helms Foundation Player of the Year (1943); Consensus first-team All-American (1943); NCAA scoring champion (1943); No. 4 retired by Saint Joseph's Hawks; As coach: NBA champion (1956); NBA All-Star Game head coach (1956)

Career NBA playing statistics
- Points: 3,455 (7.2 ppg)
- Rebounds: 878 (3.5 rpg)
- Assists: 1,553 (3.2 apg)
- Stats at NBA.com
- Stats at Basketball Reference

Career coaching record
- NBA: 119–97 (.551)
- Record at Basketball Reference

George Lawrence Senesky (April 4, 1922 – June 25, 2001) was an American professional basketball player and coach. A 6'2" guard from Saint Joseph's University, he was the 1942–43 College Basketball Season's Consensus Player of the Year and played for eight seasons in the Basketball Association of America (BAA) and the National Basketball Association (NBA), all with the Philadelphia Warriors. He later coached the franchise, from 1955 through to 1958, winning the NBA title in 1956.

== Professional career ==
A Pennsylvania native, Senesky played for the St. Joseph Hawks from 1940 to 1943. In his final year, he averaged 23.4 points a game scoring 515 total points in 22 games of that season, a school record. Seven years later, his brother Paul broke the record. He was the unofficial NCAA scoring champion for that year. Afterwards, he served in the Army Air Forces in World War II. After he had served, he played for the Philadelphia Sphas of the American Basketball League for one season. He then went to play for the Philadelphia Warriors in the first season of the Basketball Association of America in 1947. That same year, the Warriors won the BAA Finals over the Chicago Stags. He scored 10.4 points per game in the 1950–51 season, with 679 points in 65 games. In his eight seasons, he played 482 games, made 1279 out of 4087 shots for a .313 percentage, and 897 out of 1277 free throws for a .702 percentage. He four seasons in which he averaged more than 8 points a game. After a season where he averaged 1.9 points a game with 111 points in 58 games, he retired.

== Coaching career ==
Two seasons after retiring from the Warriors, Senesky returned to coach the team. Like the man he had replaced, Senesky won a title in his first year. In his first year, he coached them to a 45–27 record, finishing 1st in the Eastern Division. The Warriors beat the defending champion Syracuse Nationals in five games to advance to their first NBA Finals since 1948. In the Finals, the Warriors beat the Fort Wayne Pistons in five games to win their first championship in nine years.

In his second year, he led them to a 37–35 record, finishing three games behind the eventual champion Boston Celtics in the Division. The Warriors were swept in two games by the Syracuse Nationals.

In his third (and final) year, they finished with the same record and place in the division. They beat Syracuse in three games to advance to the Division Finals, but they lost to the Celtics in five games.

== Death ==
Senesky died of cancer on June 25, 2001, at the age of 79.

== BAA/NBA career statistics ==
Legend
GP	Games played	GS	Games started	MPG	Minutes per game
FG%	Field goal percentage	3P%	3-point field goal percentage	FT%	Free throw percentage
RPG	Rebounds per game	APG	Assists per game	SPG	Steals per game
BPG	Blocks per game	PPG	Points per game	**Bold**	Career high
†	Won an NBA championship

=== Regular season ===
Year	Team	GP	MPG	FG%	FT%	RPG	APG	PPG
1946–47†	Philadelphia	58	–	.267	.661	–	.6	6.3
1947–48	Philadelphia	47	–	.277	.667	–	1.1	8.8
1948–49	Philadelphia	60	–	.267	.730	–	3.9	6.5
1949–50	Philadelphia	68	–	.320	.704	–	3.9	9.0
1950–51	Philadelphia	65	–	.354	**.761**	**5.0**	**5.3**	**10.4**
1951–52	Philadelphia	57	33.8	**.361**	.753	4.1	4.9	8.3
1952–53	Philadelphia	**69**	**33.9**	.330	.637	3.7	3.8	6.0
1953–54	Philadelphia	58	13.3	.345	.547	1.1	1.4	1.9
Career		482	27.3	.313	.702	3.5	3.2	7.2

=== Playoffs ===
Year	Team	GP	MPG	FG%	FT%	RPG	APG	PPG
1947†	Philadelphia	10	–	.317	**.808**	–	.8	10.9
1948	Philadelphia	**13**	–	.314	.644	–	.8	9.9
1949	Philadelphia	2	–	.136	.750	–	2.0	6.0
1950	Philadelphia	2	–	.375	.500	–	1.5	7.0
1951	Philadelphia	2	–	.182	.778	3.5	**7.5**	7.5
1952	Philadelphia	3	**40.0**	**.545**	.636	**4.0**	3.7	**14.3**
Career		32	40.0	.320	.699	3.8	1.6	10.1

== Head coaching record ==
Team	Year	G	W	L	W–L%	Finish	PG	PW	PL	PW–L%	Result
Philadelphia	1955–56	72	45	27	.625	1st in Eastern	10	7	3	.700	Won NBA Championship
Philadelphia	1956–57	72	37	35	.514	3rd in Eastern	2	0	2	.000	Lost Eastern semifinal
Philadelphia	1957–58	72	37	35	.514	3rd in Eastern	8	3	5	.375	Lost Eastern final
Career		216	119	97	.551		20	10	10	.500	
