= Sonny Parker (basketball) =

American basketball player (born 1955)

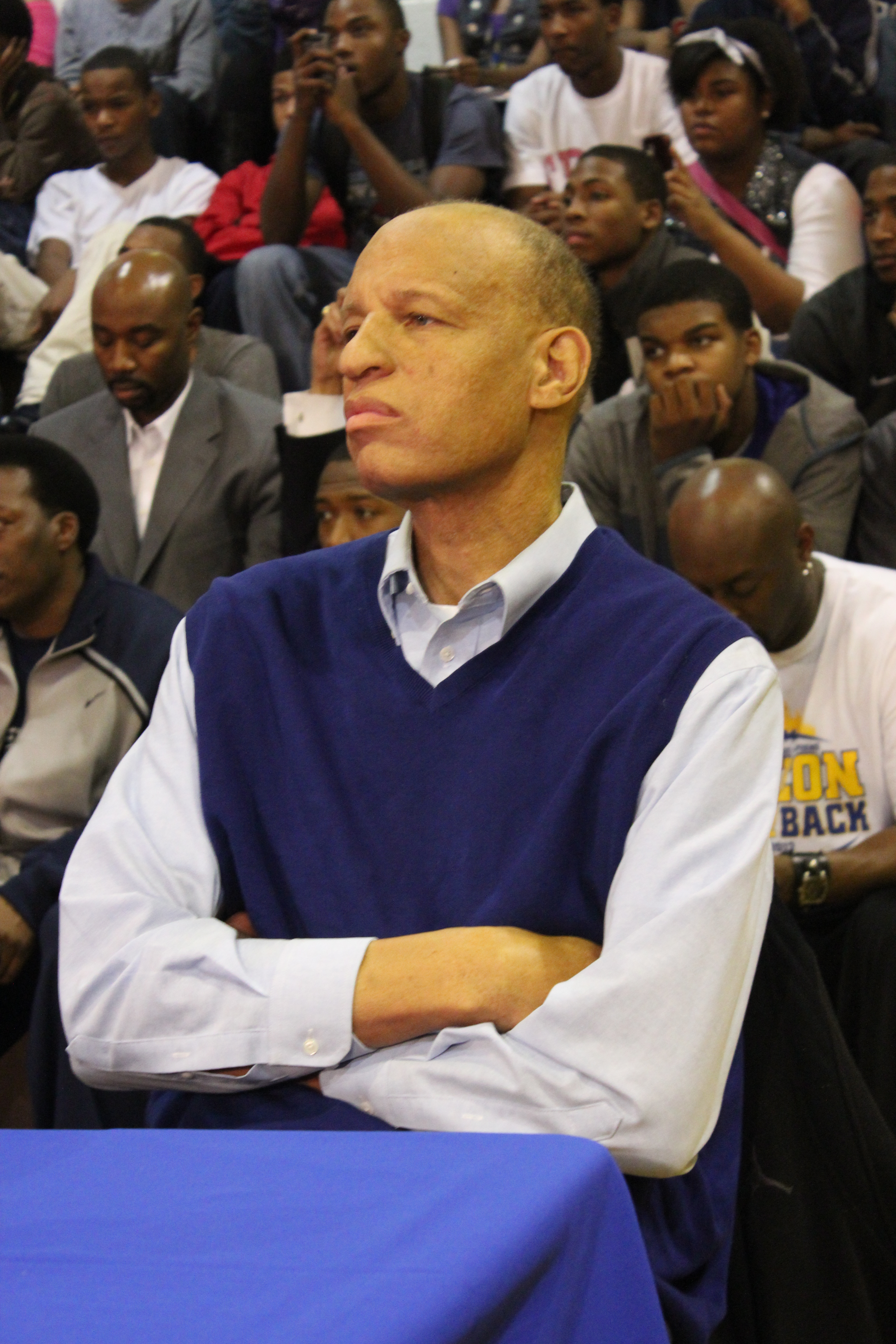
- Sonny listens as his son Jabari announces his verbal commitment to Duke on December 20, 2012

Personal information
- Born: March 22, 1955 (age 71) Chicago, Illinois, U.S.
- Listed height: 6 ft 6 in (1.98 m)
- Listed weight: 200 lb (91 kg)

Career information
- High school: Farragut Career Academy (Chicago, Illinois)
- College: Mineral Area (1972–1974); Texas A&M (1974–1976)
- NBA draft: 1976: 1st round, 17th overall pick
- Drafted by: Golden State Warriors
- Playing career: 1976–1982
- Position: Small forward / shooting guard
- Number: 22

Career history
- 1976–1982: Golden State Warriors

Career highlights
- 2× First-team All-SWC (1975, 1976)

Career NBA statistics
- Points: 4,471 (9.9 ppg)
- Rebounds: 1,841 (4.1 rpg)
- Assists: 954 (2.1 apg)
- Stats at NBA.com
- Stats at Basketball Reference

Robert S. "Sonny" Parker (born March 22, 1955) is an American former professional basketball player who played small forward and shooting guard for the Golden State Warriors of the National Basketball Association (NBA). He was drafted in the first round of the 1976 NBA draft after attending and playing basketball at Texas A&M University. After retiring from basketball, Parker created the Sonny Parker Youth Foundation in Chicago to help inner-city students.

== Early years ==
Parker was born in Chicago, Illinois and attended Chicago's Farragut High School, where he received All-City, All-State, and All-Public League honors. In appreciation of his efforts on the school's basketball team, he has been named to the Farragut Hall of Fame, the Chicago Public Schools Hall of Fame, and the Illinois High School Hall of Fame.

After graduating from high school, Parker spent two years at Mineral Area College. In both of his seasons, Parker was named an All-American, as well as Conference Player of the Year and Region Player of the Year. He was an All-Conference and All-Region pick, and is the Mineral Area College's Leading Career Scorer. He has been inducted into the National Junior College Hall of Fame. The 1973 team won the conference championship.

== College career ==
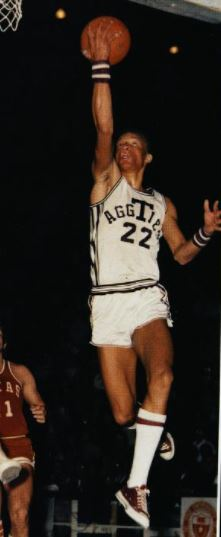
Parker as a junior at Texas A&M.

Although Parker was recruited by many of the top college basketball programs, he chose to attend Texas A&M University, primarily to learn under legendary coach Shelby Metcalf. The lonely Parker, over 1000 miles from home, was quickly embraced by Metcalf and his family, often accompanying his coach on fishing trips. The men became close enough friends that after Parker was named the most valuable player in one of the many college tournaments in which A&M participated, he gave his reward, a nice watch, to Metcalf as a gift. Metcalf treasured the watch for twenty-five years, before giving it to Parker's son Christian at the ceremony inducting Parker into the Texas A&M Athletic Hall of Fame. At Metcalf's funeral in February 2007, Parker gave a eulogy and served as one of the pallbearers.

In his two years at Texas A&M, Parker led the Aggies to back-to-back Southwest Conference titles, earning himself first-team All-Southwest Conference honors both years as well. The team reached the NCAA Tournament in 1974–1975. As a senior, Parker averaged 20.7 points per game, a feat that only two other Aggie players have achieved in the 20 years since he left.

=== Honors ===
- Newcomer of the Year
- All Conference
- All Defensive Team
- Texas A&M MVP
- SWC All Decade Team
- All American
- Pizza Hut-Slam Dunk Award
- All Star Game
- Texas A&M Hall of Fame

== Professional career ==
Parker was a first-round draft pick, chosen by the Golden State Warriors as the 17th overall pick in the 1976 NBA draft. For 29 years, Parker held the record as the highest an Aggie had ever been drafted, until in 2005 Antoine Wright was chosen as the 15th overall draft pick by the New Jersey Nets.

In his rookie season, Parker played in 65 games, scoring a total of 379 points (5.8 points per game), with 2.7 rebounds per game and .9 assists per game. His team reached the playoffs, with Parker contributing 4.2 points per game and 2.8 rebounds, and .9 assists per game.

The following season, Parker played in 82 games, averaging 11.4 points per game, 4.7 rebounds, and 1.9 assists. He ranked 16th in the NBA for Field Goal Percentage, with .519 field goals (406 out of 783). His best season, however, came in 1978–1979, where he averaged 15.2 points, 5.7 rebounds, and 3.7 assists per game, with 144 steals and 33 blocks.

In a thrilling game in November 1981, Parker led the Warriors to a 102–100 victory over the Houston Rockets. At the opening of the final quarter, the Warriors trailed by 10 points before Parker and teammate Joe Hassett combined to score 13 points and give the Warriors their first lead with 3 minutes left to play. The game was tied at 100 when Parker rebounded a shot by his teammate Lloyd Free with two seconds remaining and completed a reverse layup to give the Warriors their victory.

After a disappointing 1981-82 season, where Parker averaged only 3.9 points, 2.5 rebounds, and 2.1 assists per game, in September 1982 the Warriors waived Parker, ending his NBA career.

For the six years that he played professional basketball, Parker averaged 9.9 points, 4.1 rebounds, and 2.1 assists per game.

== Youth Foundation ==
In 1990, Parker established the non-profit Sonny Parker Youth Foundation (SPYF) in his hometown of Chicago. The foundation is designed to provide year-round educational, recreational, and multi-cultural programs for inner-city children from kindergarten through 12th grade. Through after-school and weekend programs, the foundation provides tutoring, ACT/SAT preparation, parents' workshops, job training, mentoring, career planning, and physical education in the hopes of improving the reading and writing skills of the students and preparing them to become more productive citizens. Parker is the president of the organization and is active in its daily activities.

== Personal life ==
Parker and his wife, Lola, have seven children. Parker's son Christian played at BYU-Hawaii before serving an LDS mission in Atlanta, Georgia; upon return he finished his career at the College of Southern Idaho. He then enrolled at the University of Washington; he aspires to become a collegiate basketball coach. Parker's eldest son, Darryl, is a graduate of the University of Oregon and played professional basketball overseas. He is now a Chicago police officer. Parker's son Jabari is a former Duke basketball player who was selected by the Milwaukee Bucks with the 2nd pick in the 2014 NBA draft. As of March 2013 Sonny was afflicted with kidney problems that require dialysis, making it difficult for him to attend Jabari's games.

== Career statistics ==
Legend
GP	Games played	GS	Games started	MPG	Minutes per game
FG%	Field goal percentage	3P%	3-point field goal percentage	FT%	Free throw percentage
RPG	Rebounds per game	APG	Assists per game	SPG	Steals per game
BPG	Blocks per game	PPG	Points per game	**Bold**	Career high

=== NBA ===
==== Regular season ====
Year	Team	GP	GS	MPG	FG%	3P%	FT%	RPG	APG	SPG	BPG	PPG
1976–77	Golden State	65		13.7	**.527**		.772	2.7	.9	.8	**.4**	5.8
1977–78	Golden State	**82**		25.2	.519		.705	4.7	1.9	1.6	**.4**	11.4
1978–79	Golden State	79		**36.6**	.502		**.788**	5.6	**3.7**	1.8	**.4**	**15.2**
1979–80	Golden State	**82**	**82**	34.7	.489	.000	.785	**5.7**	3.1	**2.1**	**.4**	14.7
1980–81	Golden State	73		18.0	.492	–	.734	2.7	1.5	.9	.2	6.5
1981–82	Golden State	71	0	12.7	.473	–	.667	2.5	1.3	.5	.2	3.9
Career		452	82	24.2	.501	.000	.755	4.1	2.1	1.4	.3	9.9

==== Playoffs ====
Year	Team	GP	MPG	FG%	FT%	RPG	APG	SPG	BPG	PPG
1977	Golden State	10	12.0	.528	1.000	2.8	.9	.5	.2	4.2
