= Philadelphia Sphas all-time roster =

This is a list of players who appeared in at least one game with the early professional and semi-professional basketball team, the Philadelphia Sphas. Some of the names in this list are incomplete.

== A ==
- Anderson, first name unknown
- George Artus
- Atherholt, first name unknown

== B ==
- Oscar Baldwin
- David "Davey" Banks
- Baraz, first name unknown
- Thomas "Tom" Barlow
- Bob Barnett
- Morris "Moe" Becker
- William "Billy" Beckett
- Edward "Ed" Beron
- Solomon "Solly" Bertman
- Edwin "Hughie" Black
- Meyer "Mike" Bloom
- Simon "Cy" Boardman
- Brophy, first name known
- Andy Brown
- Stanley "Stan" Brown
- Mark "Mockie" Bunin

== C ==
- Min Calhoun
- James "Soup" Campbell
- Gaza Chizmadia
- George Clift
- Arthur "Artie" Cohen
- Saul Cohen
- Rody Cooney

== D ==
- Davis, first name unknown
- Irving "Irv" Davis
- Cornelius "Neil" Deighan
- Richard "Rich" Deighan
- Joe Della Monica
- James "Jimmy" Dessen
- Disney, first name unknown
- Edwin "Eddie" Dolin
- "Jiggs" Downey
- Louis "Lou" Dubin

== E ==
- Emslie, first name unknown

== F ==
- George Feigenbaum
- Gilbert "Gil" Fitch
- Jerome "Jerry" Fleishman
- "Buck" Flemming
- Bernie Fliegel
- Harry Forman
- Louis "Lou" Forman
- Russell "Russ" Fossett
- Dave Fox
- L. James "Jim" Fox
- "Bunny" Freeman
- Mooney "Mort" Freemark

== G ==
- Walter "Walt" Gailey
- Daniel "Bud" Gaines
- George Garber
- Jack "Dutch" Garfinkel
- C. Gorham Getchell
- Schireli Geventer
- George Glasco
- Edward "Sonny" Gluck
- Emanuel "Menchy" Goldblatt
- Benjamin "Ben" Goldfaden
- Morris "Moe" Goldman
- Dave Gordon
- Gorman, first name unknown
- Joel "Shikey" Gotthofer
- Edward "Eddie" Gottlieb
- Leo Gottlieb
- Matthew "Matt" Guokas
- Greenspan, first name unknown
- Robert "Bob" Griebe
- Arthur "Art" Gurfein

== H ==
- Ed Hall
- Harris, first name unknown
- George Herlich
- John "Jack" Hewson
- Arthur "Art" Hillhouse
- Joseph "Joe" Hyde

== K ==
- Ralph Kaplowitz
- David "Cy" Kaselman
- Julius "Jules" Kasner
- Edward "Ted" Kearns
- Alfred "Al" Kellett
- Ed Kempner
- Harry Kirshner
- Louis "Red" Klotz
- Ralph "Babe" Klotz
- Harry Knorr
- Herman Knuppel
- William "Bill" Kobler
- Meyer "Moyer" Krabovitch
- Ray Kravitz

== L ==
- Louis "Inky" Lautman
- Isadore "Izzy" Leff
- Allen "Al" Lehr
- Charles Lester
- William "Bill" Levine
- Abraham Lewbart
- Harry Litwack
- Bob Lojewski
- Milton "Babe" Liman
- Eddie Lyons

== M ==
- Michael "Mickey" Maister
- Eddie Makransky
- Phil Markoff
- Marshall, first name unknown
- William "Bill" McCahan
- John "Red" McGaffney
- Daniel "Dan" McNichol
- Frank "Stretch" Meehan
- Solomon "Sol" Miehoff
- Edward "Ed" Miller
- David Mondros
- Pete Monska
- Samuel "Sam" Moorehead
- William "Chink" Morganstine
- Elmore Morgenthaler
- Charles "Charlie" Mosicant
- John "Johnny" Murphy

== N ==
- Charles "Charlie" Neuman
- George "Dutch" Newman
- Paul Nowak

== O ==
- Tom O'Connell
- Bernard "Bernie" Opper

== P ==
- Harry Passon
- Herman "Chickie" Passon
- Max Patkin
- Pearson, first name unknown
- Harry Platt
- Max "Mac" Posnak
- Louis "Lou" Possner
- Joseph "Joe" Povernick
- Prescott, first name unknown

== R ==
- Phil Rabin
- Howard "Howie" Rader
- Leonard "Len" Rader
- Moe Rappaport
- John "Inky" Reagan
- Irvin "Irv" Reichman
- Joseph "Beno" Resnick
- Henry "Harry" Riconda
- Jack Rocker
- Howard "Red" Rosan
- Alexander "Petey" Rosenberg
- Irwin "Irv" Rothenberg
- Generoso "Jerry" Rullo
- Rutt, first name unknown

== S ==
- Oscar "Ossie" Schectman
- Alfred "Al" Scheider
- Louis "Lou" Schneiderman
- John Schrey
- Solomon "Butch" Schwartz
- George Senesky
- Louis "Reds" Sherr
- C. Arthur "Art" Shires
- Morris "Mendy" Snyder
- Soltaire, first name unknown
- Staberg, first name unknown
- Frank Stanczak
- Charles "Charlie" Swartz

== T ==
- Aaron Tanitsky
- Charles Tettemer
- David "Hank" Thomas
- David "Dave" Tobey
- Irving "Irv" Torgoff
- Edward "Ed" Trubin

== V ==
- Wylys "Bill" Van Osten

== W ==
- Paul Wallace
- Watman, first name unknown
- Leonard "Len" Weiner
- Abraham "Butch" Weintraub
- Frederick "Fritz" Weller
- Jack "Yock" Welsh
- Fred "Fritz" Wesslock
- "Doc" White
- Robert "Albie" Wiener
- Williams, first name unknown
- Wilson, first name unknown
- Lou Wisner
- George "Red" Wolfe

== Y ==
- D. Young

== Z ==
- Bill Zeiss
- Nathan "Zibby" Zibelman
- William "Bill Zubic"
