= List of NBA career playoff scoring leaders =

This article provides two lists:

A list of National Basketball Association players by total career Playoffs points scored.

A progressive list of scoring leaders showing how the record increased through the years.

== Scoring leaders ==
This article provides a list of National Basketball Association players by total career Playoffs points scored.

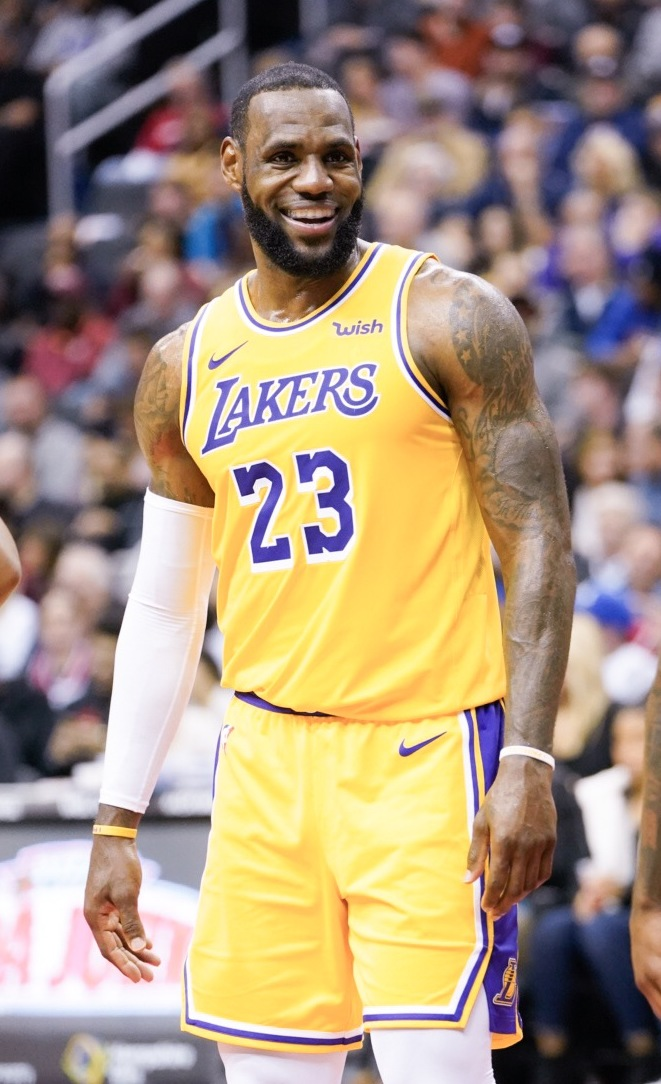
LeBron James has scored the most points in NBA playoffs history.

^	Active NBA player
*	Inducted into the Naismith Memorial Basketball Hall of Fame

Statistics accurate as of the 2026 NBA playoffs.

Rank	Player	Position(s)	Playoff team(s) played for (years)	Total points	Games played	Points per game average	Field goals made	Three-point field goals made	Free throws made
1	LeBron James^	SF	Cleveland Cavaliers (2006–2010, 2015–2018); Miami Heat (2011–2014); Los Angeles Lakers (2020–2021, 2023–2026)	8,521	302	28.2	3,055	497	1,914
2	Michael Jordan*	SG	Chicago Bulls (1985–1993, 1995–1998)	5,987	179	33.4	2,188	148	1,463
3	Kareem Abdul-Jabbar*	C	Milwaukee Bucks (1970–1974); Los Angeles Lakers (1977–1989)	5,762	237	24.3	2,356	0	1,320
4	Kobe Bryant*	SG	Los Angeles Lakers (1997–2004, 2006–2012)	5,640	220	25.6	2,014	292	1,269
5	Shaquille O'Neal*	C	Orlando Magic (1994–1996); Los Angeles Lakers (1997–2004); Miami Heat (2005–2007); Phoenix Suns (2008); Cleveland Cavaliers (2010); Boston Celtics (2011)	5,250	216	24.3	2,041	0	1,217
6	Tim Duncan*	PF/C	San Antonio Spurs (1998–1999, 2001–2016)	5,172	251	20.6	1,975	5	1,213
7	Kevin Durant^	SF/PF	Oklahoma City Thunder (2010–2014, 2016); Golden State Warriors (2017–2019); Brooklyn Nets (2021–2022); Phoenix Suns (2023–2024); Houston Rockets (2026)	5,008	171	29.3	1,691	367	1,259
8	Karl Malone*	PF	Utah Jazz (1986–2003); Los Angeles Lakers (2004)	4,761	193	24.7	1,743	6	1,171
9	Jerry West*	PG/SG	Los Angeles Lakers (1961–1970, 1972–1974)	4,457	153	29.1	1,622	n/a	1,074
10	James Harden^	SG/PG	Oklahoma City Thunder (2010–2012); Houston Rockets (2013–2020); Brooklyn Nets (2021); Philadelphia 76ers (2022–2023); Los Angeles Clippers (2024–2025); Cleveland Cavaliers (2026)	4,240	191	22.2	1,275	472	1,218
11	Stephen Curry^	PG	Golden State Warriors (2013–2019, 2022–2023, 2025)	4,147	155	26.8	1,388	650	721
12	Tony Parker*	PG	San Antonio Spurs (2002–2018)	4,045	226	17.9	1,613	119	1,068
13	Dwyane Wade*	SG	Miami Heat (2004–2007, 2009–2014, 2016, 2018); Chicago Bulls (2017)	3,954	177	22.3	1,450	103	951
14	Larry Bird*	SF/PF	Boston Celtics (1980–1988, 1990–1992)	3,897	164	23.8	1,458	80	901
15	John Havlicek*	SF/SG	Boston Celtics (1963–1969, 1972–1977)	3,776	172	22.0	1,451	n/a	874
16	Hakeem Olajuwon*	C	Houston Rockets (1985–1991, 1993–1999); Toronto Raptors (2002)	3,755	145	25.9	1,504	4	743
17	Magic Johnson*	PG	Los Angeles Lakers (1980–1991, 1996)	3,701	190	19.5	1,291	51	1,068
18	Dirk Nowitzki*	PF	Dallas Mavericks (2001–2012, 2014–2016)	3,663	145	25.3	1,220	149	1,074
19	Scottie Pippen*	SF	Chicago Bulls (1988–1998); Houston Rockets (1999); Portland Trail Blazers (2000–2003)	3,642	208	17.5	1,335	200	772
20	Elgin Baylor*	SF	Minneapolis/Los Angeles Lakers (1959–1970)	3,623	134	27.0	1,388	n/a	847
21	Wilt Chamberlain*	C	Philadelphia/San Francisco Warriors (1960–1962, 1964); Philadelphia 76ers (1965–1968); Los Angeles Lakers (1969–1973)	3,607	160	22.5	1,425	n/a	757
22	Kevin McHale*	PF	Boston Celtics (1981–1993)	3,182	169	18.8	1,204	8	766
23	Paul Pierce*	SF/SG	Boston Celtics (2002–2005, 2008–2013); Brooklyn Nets (2014); Washington Wizards (2015); Los Angeles Clippers (2016–2017)	3,180	170	18.7	1,022	276	860
24	Kawhi Leonard^	SF	San Antonio Spurs (2012–2017); Toronto Raptors (2019); Los Angeles Clippers (2020–2021, 2023–2025)	3,133	146	21.5	1,120	249	644
25	Dennis Johnson*	PG	Seattle SuperSonics (1978–1980); Phoenix Suns (1981–1983); Boston Celtics (1984–1990)	3,116	180	17.3	1,167	26	756
Rank	Player	Position(s)	Playoff team(s) played for (years)	Total points	Games played	Points per game average	Field goals made	Three-point field goals made	Free throws made

== Progressive list of playoff scoring leaders ==
This is a progressive list of scoring leaders showing how the record increased through the years.

Statistics accurate as of the 2026 NBA playoffs.

^	Active NBA player
*	Inducted into the Naismith Memorial Basketball Hall of Fame

Team abbreviationsTeam(s) listed indicates the team(s) the player was on when the player established the record.
BAL	Baltimore Bullets	GSW	Golden State Warriors	MNL	Minneapolis Lakers	PHX	Phoenix Suns	STL	St. Louis Hawks
BOS	Boston Celtics	HOU	Houston Rockets	NYK	New York Knicks	ROC	Rochester Royals	SYR	Syracuse Nationals
CHI	Chicago Bulls	LAL	Los Angeles Lakers	OKC	Oklahoma City Thunder	SAS	San Antonio Spurs	TOR	Toronto Raptors
CLE	Cleveland Cavaliers	MIA	Miami Heat	PHI	Philadelphia 76ers	SEA	Seattle SuperSonics	UTA	Utah Jazz
DAL	Dallas Mavericks	MIL	Milwaukee Bucks	PHW	Philadelphia Warriors	SFW	San Francisco Warriors	WSB	Washington Bullets

Playoff scoring leader at the end of every season
Season	Year-by-year leader	Pts	Active player leader	Pts	Career record	Pts	Single-season record	Pts	Season
1946–47	Joe Fulks*PHW	222	Joe Fulks*PHW	222	Joe Fulks*PHW	222	Joe Fulks*PHW	222	1946–47
1947–48	Joe Fulks*PHW	282	Joe Fulks*PHW	504	Joe Fulks*PHW	504	Joe Fulks*PHW	282	1947–48
1948–49	George Mikan*MNL	303	Joe Fulks*PHW	504	Joe Fulks*PHW	504	George Mikan*MNL	303	1948–49
1949–50	George Mikan*MNL	376	George Mikan*MNL	679	George Mikan*MNL	679	George Mikan*MNL	376	1949–50
1950–51	Arnie Risen*ROC	273	George Mikan*MNL	847	George Mikan*MNL	847	George Mikan*MNL	376	1950–51
1951–52	George Mikan*MNL	307	George Mikan*MNL	1,154	George Mikan*MNL	1,154	George Mikan*MNL	376	1951–52
1952–53	George Mikan*MNL	238	George Mikan*MNL	1,392	George Mikan*MNL	1,392	George Mikan*MNL	376	1952–53
1953–54	George Mikan*MNL	252	George Mikan*MNL	1,644	George Mikan*MNL	1,644	George Mikan*MNL	376	1953–54
1954–55	Dolph Schayes*SYR	209	Jim Pollard*MNL	977	George Mikan*MNL	1,644	George Mikan*MNL	376	1954–55
1955–56	Paul Arizin*PHW	289	George Mikan*MNL	1,680	George Mikan*MNL	1,680	George Mikan*MNL	376	1955–56
1956–57	Bob Pettit*STL	298	Dolph Schayes*SYR	1,192	George Mikan*MNL	1,680	George Mikan*MNL	376	1956–57
1957–58	Cliff Hagan*STL	305	Dolph Schayes*SYR	1,272	George Mikan*MNL	1,680	George Mikan*MNL	376	1957–58
1958–59	Elgin Baylor*MNL	331	Dolph Schayes*SYR	1,526	George Mikan*MNL	1,680	George Mikan*MNL	376	1958–59
1959–60	Bob Pettit*STL	365	Dolph Schayes*SYR	1,614	George Mikan*MNL	1,680	George Mikan*MNL	376	1959–60
1960–61	Elgin Baylor*LAL	457	Dolph Schayes*SYR	1,779	Dolph Schayes*SYR	1,779	Elgin Baylor*LAL	457	1960–61
1961–62	Elgin Baylor*LAL	502	Dolph Schayes*SYR	1,836	Dolph Schayes*SYR	1,836	Elgin Baylor*LAL	502	1961–62
1962–63	Elgin Baylor*LAL	424	Bob Cousy*BOS	2,018	Bob Cousy*BOS	2,018	Elgin Baylor*LAL	502	1962–63
1963–64	Wilt Chamberlain*SFW	416	Bob Pettit*STL	2,194	Bob Pettit*STL	2,194	Elgin Baylor*LAL	502	1963–64
1964–65	Jerry West*LAL	447	Bob Pettit*STL	2,240	Bob Pettit*STL	2,240	Elgin Baylor*LAL	502	1964–65
1965–66	Jerry West*LAL	479	Elgin Baylor*LAL	2,511	Elgin Baylor*LAL	2,511	Elgin Baylor*LAL	502	1965–66
1966–67	Rick Barry*SFW	521	Elgin Baylor*LAL	2,582	Elgin Baylor*LAL	2,582	Rick Barry*SFW	521	1966–67
1967–68	John Havlicek*BOS	493	Elgin Baylor*LAL	3,010	Elgin Baylor*LAL	3,010	Rick Barry*SFW	521	1967–68
1968–69	Jerry West*LAL	556	Elgin Baylor*LAL	3,287	Elgin Baylor*LAL	3,287	Jerry West*LAL	556	1968–69
1969–70	Jerry West*LAL	562	Jerry West*LAL	3,708	Jerry West*LAL	3,708	Jerry West*LAL	562	1969–70
1970–71	Earl Monroe*BAL	397	Jerry West*LAL	3,708	Jerry West*LAL	3,708	Jerry West*LAL	562	1970–71
1971–72	Walt Frazier*NYK	388	Jerry West*LAL	4,052	Jerry West*LAL	4,052	Jerry West*LAL	562	1971–72
1972–73	Jerry West*LAL	401	Jerry West*LAL	4,453	Jerry West*LAL	4,453	Jerry West*LAL	562	1972–73
1973–74	Kareem Abdul-Jabbar*LAL	515	Jerry West*LAL	4,457	Jerry West*LAL	4,457	Jerry West*LAL	562	1973–74
1974–75	Rick Barry*GSW	479	John Havlicek*BOS	3,413	Jerry West*LAL	4,457	Jerry West*LAL	562	1974–75
1975–76	Jo Jo White*BOS	408	John Havlicek*BOS	3,611	Jerry West*LAL	4,457	Jerry West*LAL	562	1975–76
1976–77	Julius Erving*PHI	518	John Havlicek*BOS	3,776	Jerry West*LAL	4,457	Jerry West*LAL	562	1976–77
1977–78	Elvin Hayes*WSB	457	John Havlicek*BOS	3,776	Jerry West*LAL	4,457	Jerry West*LAL	562	1977–78
1978–79	Gus WilliamsSEA	454	Kareem Abdul-Jabbar*LAL	2,382	Jerry West*LAL	4,457	Jerry West*LAL	562	1978–79
1979–80	Kareem Abdul-Jabbar*LAL	479	Kareem Abdul-Jabbar*LAL	2,861	Jerry West*LAL	4,457	Jerry West*LAL	562	1979–80
1980–81	Moses Malone*HOU	562	Kareem Abdul-Jabbar*LAL	2,941	Jerry West*LAL	4,457	Jerry West*LAL; Moses Malone*HOU	562	1980–81
1981–82	Julius Erving*PHI	461	Kareem Abdul-Jabbar*LAL	3,226	Jerry West*LAL	4,457	Jerry West*LAL; Moses Malone*HOU	562	1981–82
1982–83	Kareem Abdul-Jabbar*LAL	406	Kareem Abdul-Jabbar*LAL	3,632	Jerry West*LAL	4,457	Jerry West*LAL; Moses Malone*HOU	562	1982–83
1983–84	Larry Bird*BOS	632	Kareem Abdul-Jabbar*LAL	4,134	Jerry West*LAL	4,457	Larry Bird*BOS	632	1983–84
1984–85	Larry Bird*BOS	520	Kareem Abdul-Jabbar*LAL	4,550	Kareem Abdul-Jabbar*LAL	4,550	Larry Bird*BOS	632	1984–85
1985–86	Hakeem Olajuwon*HOU	537	Kareem Abdul-Jabbar*LAL	4,912	Kareem Abdul-Jabbar*LAL	4,912	Larry Bird*BOS	632	1985–86
1986–87	Larry Bird*BOS	622	Kareem Abdul-Jabbar*LAL	5,257	Kareem Abdul-Jabbar*LAL	5,257	Larry Bird*BOS	632	1986–87
1987–88	James Worthy*LAL	506	Kareem Abdul-Jabbar*LAL	5,595	Kareem Abdul-Jabbar*LAL	5,595	Larry Bird*BOS	632	1987–88
1988–89	Michael Jordan*CHI	591	Kareem Abdul-Jabbar*LAL	5,762	Kareem Abdul-Jabbar*LAL	5,762	Larry Bird*BOS	632	1988–89
1989–90	Michael Jordan*CHI	587	Larry Bird*BOS	3,681	Kareem Abdul-Jabbar*LAL	5,762	Larry Bird*BOS	632	1989–90
1990–91	Michael Jordan*CHI	529	Larry Bird*BOS	3,852	Kareem Abdul-Jabbar*LAL	5,762	Larry Bird*BOS	632	1990–91
1991–92	Michael Jordan*CHI	759	Larry Bird*BOS	3,897	Kareem Abdul-Jabbar*LAL	5,762	Michael Jordan*CHI	759	1991–92
1992–93	Michael Jordan*CHI	666	Michael Jordan*CHI	3,850	Kareem Abdul-Jabbar*LAL	5,762	Michael Jordan*CHI	759	1992–93
1993–94	Hakeem Olajuwon*HOU	664	James Worthy*LAL	3,022	Kareem Abdul-Jabbar*LAL	5,762	Michael Jordan*CHI	759	1993–94
1994–95	Hakeem Olajuwon*HOU	725	Michael Jordan*CHI	4,165	Kareem Abdul-Jabbar*LAL	5,762	Michael Jordan*CHI	759	1994–95
1995–96	Michael Jordan*CHI	552	Michael Jordan*CHI	4,717	Kareem Abdul-Jabbar*LAL	5,762	Michael Jordan*CHI	759	1995–96
1996–97	Michael Jordan*CHI	590	Michael Jordan*CHI	5,307	Kareem Abdul-Jabbar*LAL	5,762	Michael Jordan*CHI	759	1996–97
1997–98	Michael Jordan*CHI	680	Michael Jordan*CHI	5,987	Michael Jordan*CHI	5,987	Michael Jordan*CHI	759	1997–98
1998–99	Latrell SprewellNYK	407	Karl Malone*UTA	3,931	Michael Jordan*CHI	5,987	Michael Jordan*CHI	759	1998–99
1999–00	Shaquille O'Neal*LAL	707	Karl Malone*UTA	4,203	Michael Jordan*CHI	5,987	Michael Jordan*CHI	759	1999–00
2000–01	Allen Iverson*PHI	723	Karl Malone*UTA	4,341	Michael Jordan*CHI	5,987	Michael Jordan*CHI	759	2000–01
2001–02	Shaquille O'Neal*LAL	541	Michael Jordan*CHI	5,987	Michael Jordan*CHI	5,987	Michael Jordan*CHI	759	2001–02
2002–03	Tim Duncan*SAS	593	Michael Jordan*CHI	5,987	Michael Jordan*CHI	5,987	Michael Jordan*CHI	759	2002–03
2003–04	Kobe Bryant*LAL	539	Karl Malone*LAL	4,761	Michael Jordan*CHI	5,987	Michael Jordan*CHI	759	2003–04
2004–05	Tim Duncan*SAS	542	Shaquille O'Neal*; MIA 2004–07; PHX 2007–09; CLE 2009–10	4,546	Michael Jordan*CHI	5,987	Michael Jordan*CHI	759	2004–05
2005–06	Dwyane Wade*MIA	654	Shaquille O'Neal*; MIA 2004–07; PHX 2007–09; CLE 2009–10	4,970	Michael Jordan*CHI	5,987	Michael Jordan*CHI	759	2005–06
2006–07	LeBron James^CLE	501	Shaquille O'Neal*; MIA 2004–07; PHX 2007–09; CLE 2009–10	5,045	Michael Jordan*CHI	5,987	Michael Jordan*CHI	759	2006–07
2007–08	Kobe Bryant*LAL	633	Shaquille O'Neal*; MIA 2004–07; PHX 2007–09; CLE 2009–10	5,121	Michael Jordan*CHI	5,987	Michael Jordan*CHI	759	2007–08
2008–09	Kobe Bryant*LAL	695	Shaquille O'Neal*; MIA 2004–07; PHX 2007–09; CLE 2009–10	5,121	Michael Jordan*CHI	5,987	Michael Jordan*CHI	759	2008–09
2009–10	Kobe Bryant*LAL	671	Shaquille O'Neal*; MIA 2004–07; PHX 2007–09; CLE 2009–10	5,248	Michael Jordan*CHI	5,987	Michael Jordan*CHI	759	2009–10
2010–11	Dirk Nowitzki*DAL	582	Kobe Bryant*LAL	5,280	Michael Jordan*CHI	5,987	Michael Jordan*CHI	759	2010–11
2011–12	LeBron James^MIA	697	Kobe Bryant*LAL	5,640	Michael Jordan*CHI	5,987	Michael Jordan*CHI	759	2011–12
2012–13	LeBron James^MIA	596	Kobe Bryant*LAL	5,640	Michael Jordan*CHI	5,987	Michael Jordan*CHI	759	2012–13
2013–14	Kevin Durant^OKC	563	Kobe Bryant*LAL	5,640	Michael Jordan*CHI	5,987	Michael Jordan*CHI	759	2013–14
2014–15	LeBron James^CLE	601	Kobe Bryant*LAL	5,640	Michael Jordan*CHI	5,987	Michael Jordan*CHI	759	2014–15
2015–16	Klay Thompson^GSW	582	Kobe Bryant*LAL	5,640	Michael Jordan*CHI	5,987	Michael Jordan*CHI	759	2015–16
2016–17	LeBron James^CLE	591	LeBron James^ CLE 2016–18; LAL 2018–26	6,163	LeBron James^ CLE 2016–18; LAL 2018–26	6,163	Michael Jordan*CHI	759	2016–17
2017–18	LeBron James^CLE	748	LeBron James^ CLE 2016–18; LAL 2018–26	6,911	LeBron James^ CLE 2016–18; LAL 2018–26	6,911	Michael Jordan*CHI	759	2017–18
2018–19	Kawhi Leonard^TOR	732	LeBron James^ CLE 2016–18; LAL 2018–26	6,911	LeBron James^ CLE 2016–18; LAL 2018–26	6,911	Michael Jordan*CHI	759	2018–19
2019–20	Anthony Davis^LAL	582	LeBron James^ CLE 2016–18; LAL 2018–26	7,491	LeBron James^ CLE 2016–18; LAL 2018–26	7,491	Michael Jordan*CHI	759	2019–20
2020–21	Giannis Antetokounmpo^MIL	634	LeBron James^ CLE 2016–18; LAL 2018–26	7,631	LeBron James^ CLE 2016–18; LAL 2018–26	7,631	Michael Jordan*CHI	759	2020–21
2021–22	Jayson Tatum^BOS	615	LeBron James^ CLE 2016–18; LAL 2018–26	7,631	LeBron James^ CLE 2016–18; LAL 2018–26	7,631	Michael Jordan*CHI	759	2021–22
2022–23	Nikola Jokić^DEN	600	LeBron James^ CLE 2016–18; LAL 2018–26	8,023	LeBron James^ CLE 2016–18; LAL 2018–26	8,023	Michael Jordan*CHI	759	2022–23
2023–24	Luka Dončić^DAL	635	LeBron James^ CLE 2016–18; LAL 2018–26	8,162	LeBron James^ CLE 2016–18; LAL 2018–26	8,162	Michael Jordan*CHI	759	2023–24
2024–25	Shai Gilgeous-Alexander^OKC	688	LeBron James^ CLE 2016–18; LAL 2018–26	8,289	LeBron James^ CLE 2016–18; LAL 2018–26	8,289	Michael Jordan*CHI	759	2024–25
2025–26	Jalen Brunson^NYK	539	LeBron James^ CLE 2016–18; LAL 2018–26	8,521	LeBron James^ CLE 2016–18; LAL 2018–26	8,521	Michael Jordan*CHI	759	2025–26
Season	Year-by-year leader	Pts	Active player leader	Pts	Career record	Pts	Single-season record	Pts	Season

== See also ==
- Basketball statistics
- NBA post-season records
