= List of NBA career playoff assists leaders =

This article provides two lists:

A list of National Basketball Association (NBA) players by total career Playoffs assists recorded.

A progressive list of assist leaders showing how the record increased through the years.

== Playoff assist leaders ==
This is a list of National Basketball Association players by total career Playoffs assists recorded.

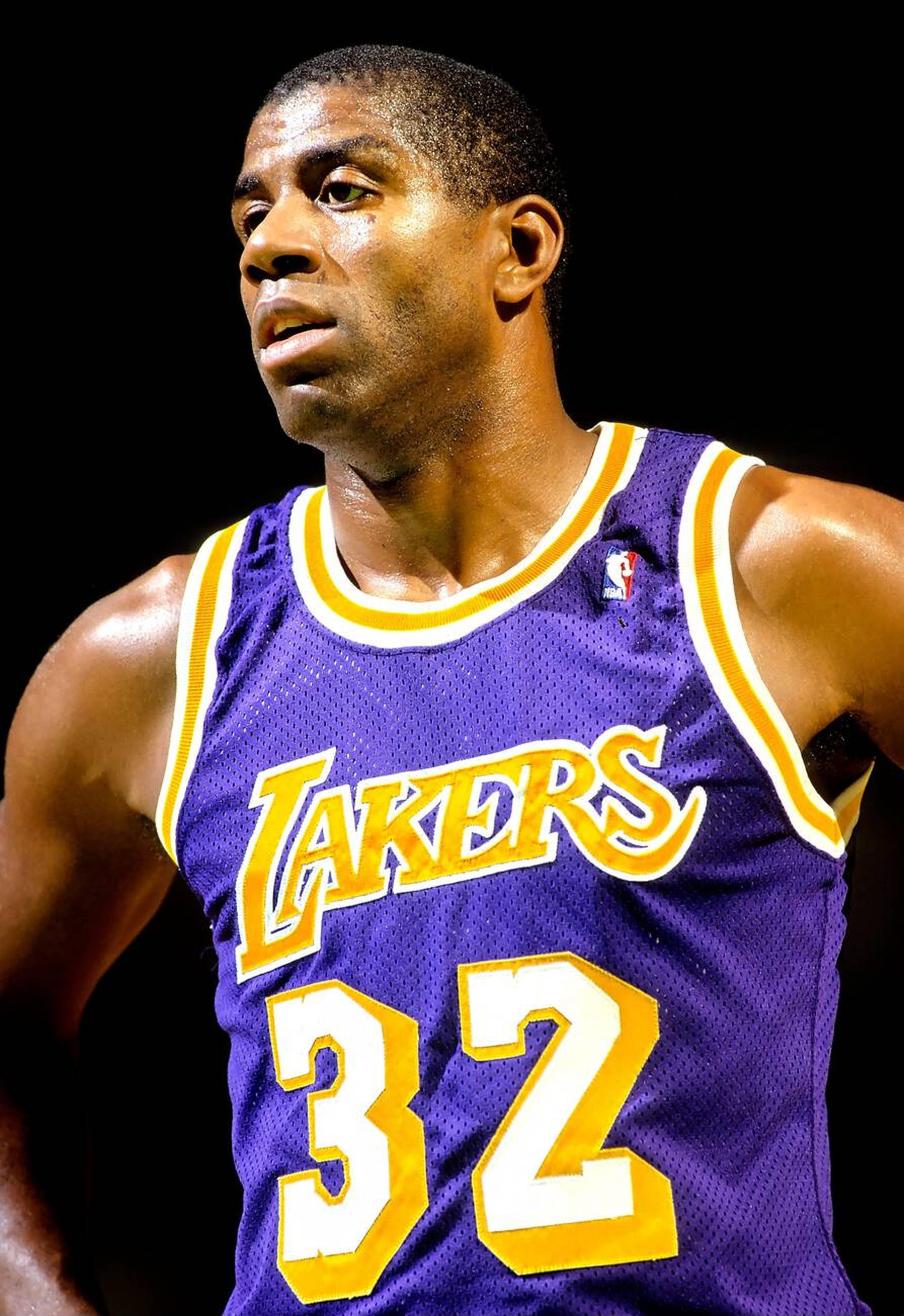
Magic Johnson holds the NBA playoff career assists record. He also holds the highest assists-per-game average in league history in both the regular season (11.19) and the playoffs (12.35).

^	Active NBA player
*	Inducted into the Naismith Memorial Basketball Hall of Fame
†	Not yet eligible for Hall of Fame consideration

Statistics accurate as of the 2026 NBA playoffs.

Rank	Player	Position(s)	Playoff team(s) played for (years)	Total assists	Games played	Assists per game average
1	Magic Johnson*	PG	Los Angeles Lakers (1980–1991, 1996)	2,346	190	12.3
2	LeBron James^	SF	Cleveland Cavaliers (2006–2010, 2015–2018); Miami Heat (2011–2014); Los Angeles Lakers (2020–2021, 2023–2026)	2,168	302	7.2
3	John Stockton*	PG	Utah Jazz (1985–2003)	1,839	182	10.1
4	Jason Kidd*	PG	Phoenix Suns (1997–2001); New Jersey Nets (2002–2007); Dallas Mavericks (2008–2012); New York Knicks (2013)	1,263	158	8.0
5	Chris Paul^{†}	PG	New Orleans Hornets (2008–2009, 2011); Los Angeles Clippers (2012–2017); Houston Rockets (2018–2019); Oklahoma City Thunder (2020); Phoenix Suns (2021–2023)	1,233	149	8.3
6	James Harden^	SG/PG	Oklahoma City Thunder (2010–2012); Houston Rockets (2013–2020); Brooklyn Nets (2021); Philadelphia 76ers (2022–2023); Los Angeles Clippers (2024–2025); Cleveland Cavaliers (2026)	1,224	191	6.4
7	Tony Parker*	PG	San Antonio Spurs (2002–2018)	1,143	226	5.1
8	Rajon Rondo	PG	Boston Celtics (2008–2012); Dallas Mavericks (2015); Chicago Bulls (2017); New Orleans Pelicans (2018); Los Angeles Lakers (2020); Los Angeles Clippers (2021)	1,136	134	8.5
9	Larry Bird*	SF/PF	Boston Celtics (1980–1988, 1990–1992)	1,062	164	6.5
10	Steve Nash*	PG	Phoenix Suns (1997–1998, 2005–2008, 2010); Dallas Mavericks (2001–2004); Los Angeles Lakers (2013)	1,061	120	8.8
11	Scottie Pippen*	SF	Chicago Bulls (1988–1998); Houston Rockets (1999); Portland Trail Blazers (2000–2003)	1,048	208	5.0
12	Kobe Bryant*	SG	Los Angeles Lakers (1997–2004, 2006–2012)	1,040	220	4.7
13	Michael Jordan*	SG	Chicago Bulls (1985–1993, 1995–1998)	1,022	179	5.7
14	Draymond Green^	PF	Golden State Warriors (2013–2019, 2022–2023, 2025)	1,020	169	6.0
15	Dennis Johnson*	PG/SG	Seattle SuperSonics (1978–1980); Phoenix Suns (1981–1983); Boston Celtics (1984–1990)	1,006	180	5.6
16	Isiah Thomas*	PG	Detroit Pistons (1984–1992)	987	111	8.9
17	Jerry West*	PG	Los Angeles Lakers (1961–1970, 1972–1974)	970	153	6.3
18	Russell Westbrook^{†}	PG	Oklahoma City Thunder (2010–2014, 2016–2019); Houston Rockets (2020); Washington Wizards (2021); Los Angeles Clippers (2023–2024); Denver Nuggets (2025)	955	135	7.1
19	Stephen Curry^	PG	Golden State Warriors (2013–2019, 2022–2023, 2025)	953	155	6.1
20	Bob Cousy*	PG	Boston Celtics (1951–1963)	937	109	8.6
21	Kevin Johnson	PG	Phoenix Suns (1989–1998, 2000)	935	105	8.9
22	Maurice Cheeks*	PG	Philadelphia 76ers (1979–1987, 1989); New York Knicks (1990–1991); New Jersey Nets (1993)	922	133	6.9
23	Mark Jackson	PG	New York Knicks (1988–1992, 2001); Los Angeles Clippers (1993); Indiana Pacers (1995–1996, 1998–2000); Utah Jazz (2003); Houston Rockets (2004)	905	131	6.9
24	Clyde Drexler*	SG	Portland Trail Blazers (1984–1994); Houston Rockets (1995–1998)	891	145	6.1
25	Dwyane Wade*	SG	Miami Heat (2004–2007, 2009–2014, 2016, 2018); Chicago Bulls (2017)	870	177	4.9

== Progressive list of playoff assist leaders ==
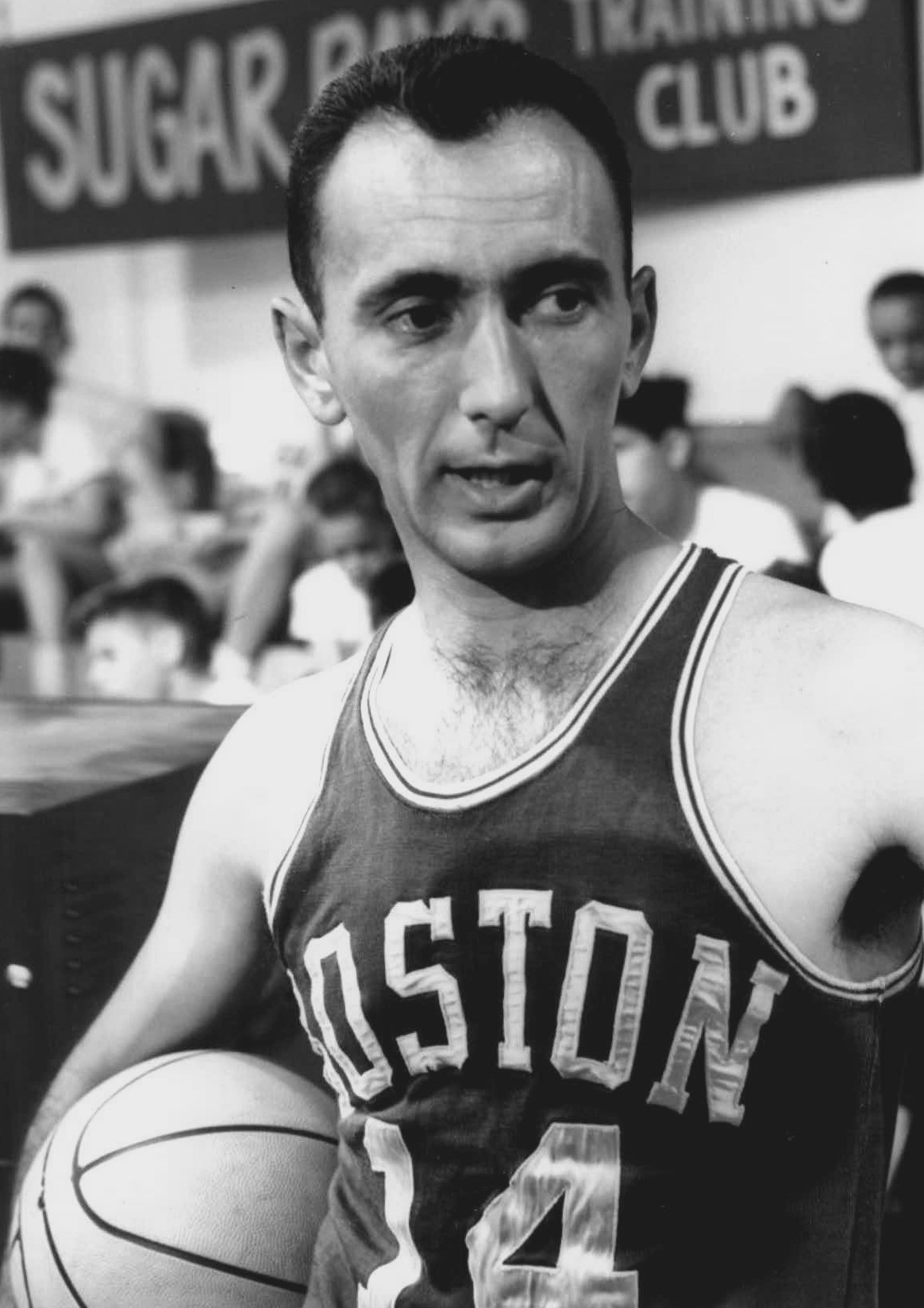
Bob Cousy held the NBA playoff career assists record from 1958 to 1973.

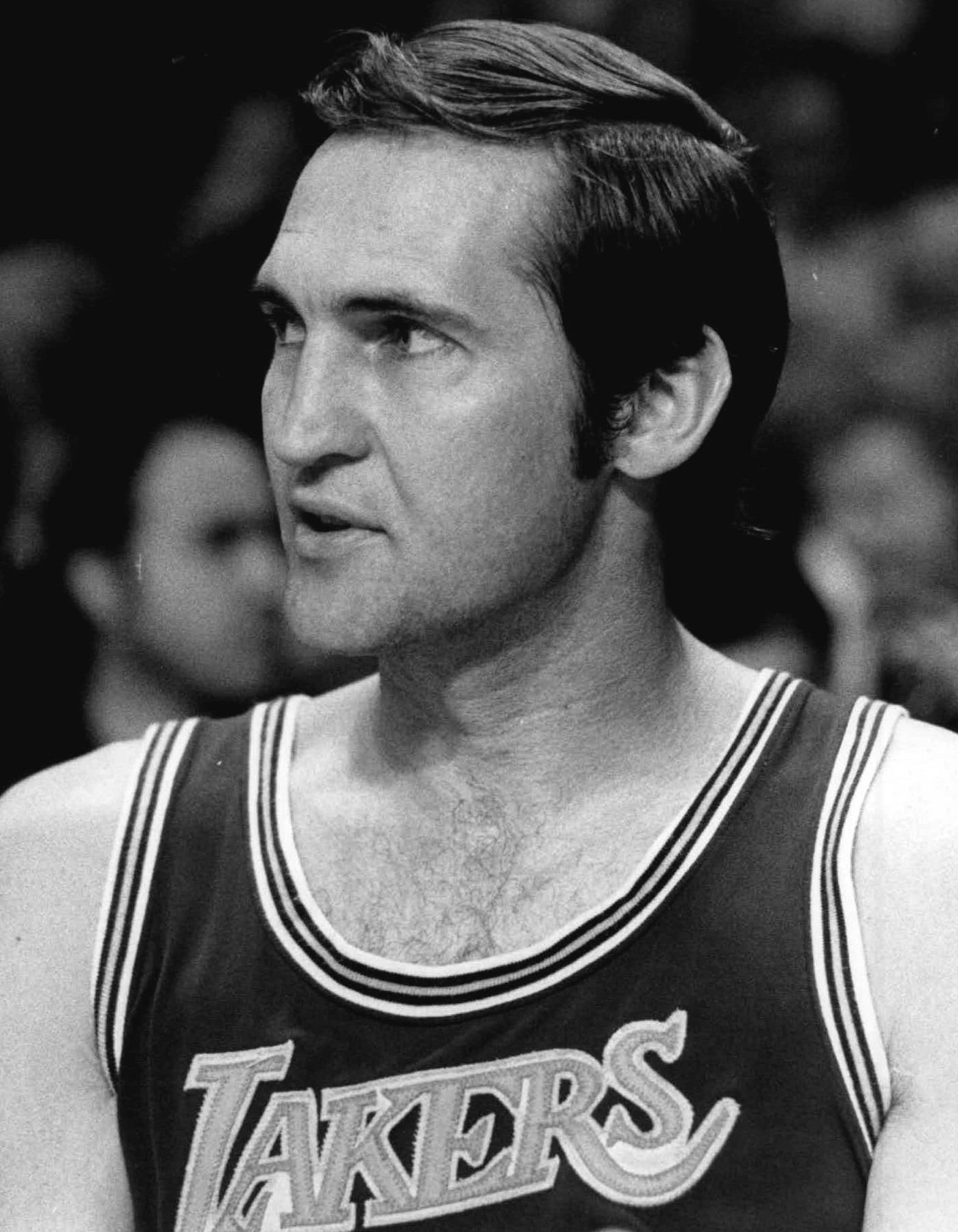
Jerry West held the NBA playoff career assists record from 1973 to 1985.

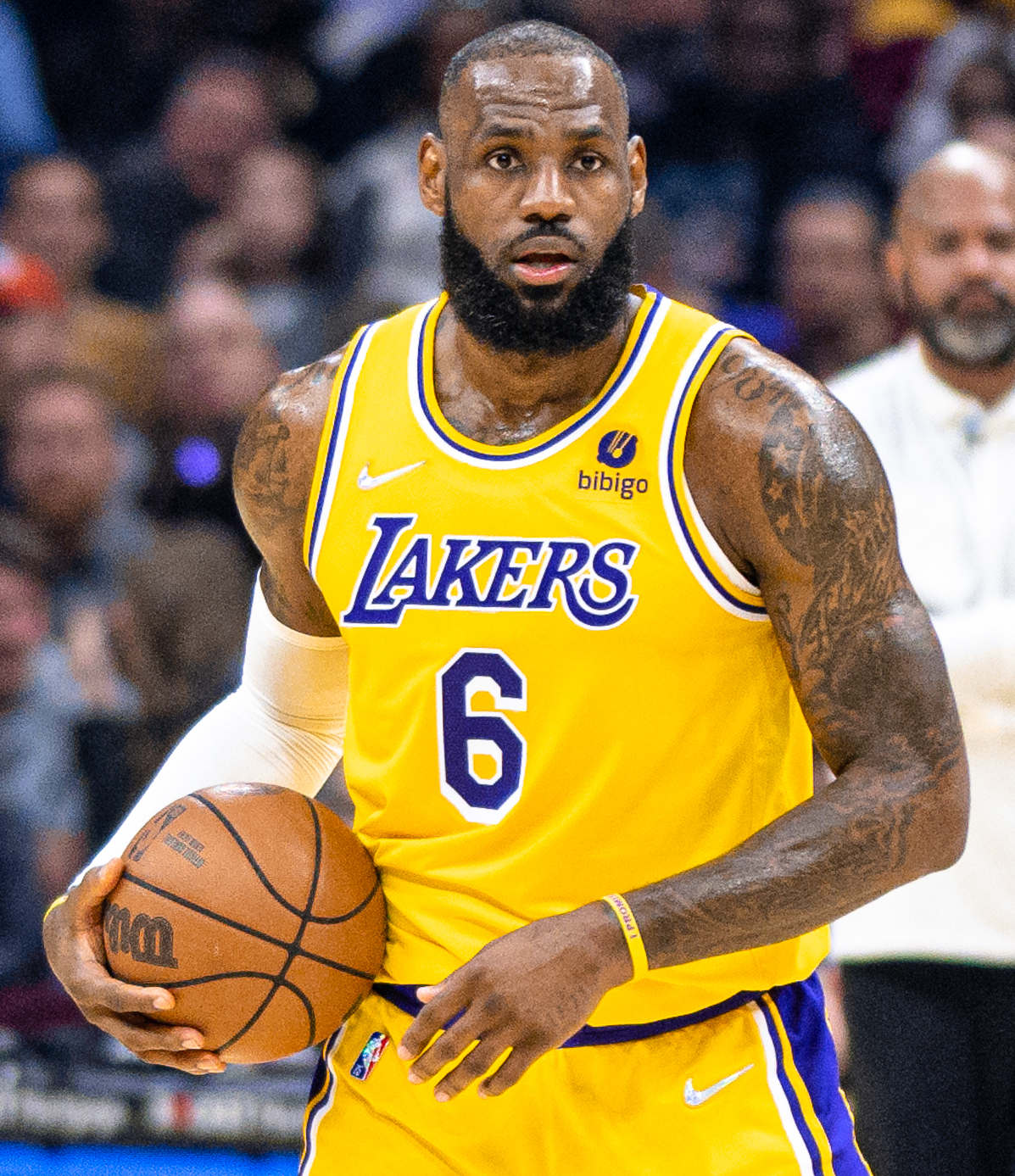
Among active players, LeBron James has recorded the most career assists in NBA playoff history.

This is a progressive list of assist leaders showing how the record increased through the years.

Statistics accurate as of the 2026 NBA playoffs.

^	Active NBA player
*	Inducted into the Naismith Memorial Basketball Hall of Fame

Team abbreviationsTeam(s) listed is the one player was on when he established the record.
ATL	Atlanta Hawks	IND	Indiana Pacers	NYK	New York Knicks	SFW	San Francisco Warriors
BOS	Boston Celtics	LAC	Los Angeles Clippers	OKC	Oklahoma City Thunder	STL	St. Louis Hawks
CHI	Chicago Bulls	LAL	Los Angeles Lakers	ORL	Orlando Magic	SYR	Syracuse Nationals
CLE	Cleveland Cavaliers	MIA	Miami Heat	PHI	Philadelphia 76ers	TOR	Toronto Raptors
DAL	Dallas Mavericks	MIL	Milwaukee Bucks	PHO	Phoenix Suns	UTA	Utah Jazz
DET	Detroit Pistons	MNL	Minneapolis Lakers	PHW	Philadelphia Warriors	WAS	Washington Wizards
FTW	Fort Wayne Pistons	NJN	New Jersey Nets	POR	Portland Trail Blazers	WSB	Washington Bullets
HOU	Houston Rockets	NOP	New Orleans Pelicans	SAS	San Antonio Spurs		

Playoff leaders and records for assists at the end of every season
Season	Year-by-year leader	AST	Active player leader	AST	Career record	AST	Single-season record	AST	Season
1946–47	Howie DallmarPHW	16	Howie DallmarPHW	16	Howie DallmarPHW	16	Howie DallmarPHW	16	1946–47
1947–48	Howie DallmarPHW	37	Howie DallmarPHW	53	Howie DallmarPHW	53	Howie DallmarPHW	37	1947–48
1948–49	Jim Pollard*MNL	39	Howie DallmarPHW	57	Howie DallmarPHW	57	Jim Pollard*MNL	39	1948–49
1949–50	Jim Pollard*MNL	56	Jim Pollard*MNL	95	Jim Pollard*MNL	95	Jim Pollard*MNL	56	1949–50
1950–51	Dick McGuire*NYK	78	Jim Pollard*MNL	122	Jim Pollard*MNL	122	Dick McGuire*NYK	78	1950–51
1951–52	Dick McGuire*NYK	90	Dick McGuire*NYK	195	Dick McGuire*NYK	195	Dick McGuire*NYK	90	1951–52
1952–53	Dick McGuire*NYK	70	Dick McGuire*NYK	265	Dick McGuire*NYK	265	Dick McGuire*NYK	90	1952–53
1953–54	Slater Martin*MNL Paul SeymourSYR	60	Dick McGuire*NYK	270	Dick McGuire*NYK	270	Dick McGuire*NYK	90	1953–54
1954–55	Andy Phillip*FTW	78	Dick McGuire*NYK	282	Dick McGuire*NYK	282	Dick McGuire*NYK	90	1954–55
1955–56	George KingSYR	60	Dick McGuire*NYK	282	Dick McGuire*NYK	282	Dick McGuire*NYK	90	1955–56
1956–57	Bob Cousy*BOS	93	Slater Martin*STL	304	Slater Martin*STL	304	Bob Cousy*BOS	93	1956–57
1957–58	Bob Cousy*BOS	82	Bob Cousy*BOS	372	Bob Cousy*BOS	372	Bob Cousy*BOS	93	1957–58
1958–59	Bob Cousy*BOS	119	Bob Cousy*BOS	491	Bob Cousy*BOS	491	Bob Cousy*BOS	119	1958–59
1959–60	Bob Cousy*BOS	116	Bob Cousy*BOS	607	Bob Cousy*BOS	607	Bob Cousy*BOS	119	1959–60
1960–61	Bob Cousy*BOS	91	Bob Cousy*BOS	698	Bob Cousy*BOS	698	Bob Cousy*BOS	119	1960–61
1961–62	Bob Cousy*BOS	123	Bob Cousy*BOS	821	Bob Cousy*BOS	821	Bob Cousy*BOS	123	1961–62
1962–63	Bob Cousy*BOS	116	Bob Cousy*BOS	937	Bob Cousy*BOS	937	Bob Cousy*BOS	123	1962–63
1963–64	Guy Rodgers*SFW	90	Bill Russell*BOS	362	Bob Cousy*BOS	937	Bob Cousy*BOS	123	1963–64
1964–65	Bill Russell*BOS	76	Bill Russell*BOS	438	Bob Cousy*BOS	937	Bob Cousy*BOS	123	1964–65
1965–66	Bill Russell*BOS	85	Bill Russell*BOS	523	Bob Cousy*BOS	937	Bob Cousy*BOS	123	1965–66
1966–67	Wilt Chamberlain*PHI	135	Bill Russell*BOS	573	Bob Cousy*BOS	937	Wilt Chamberlain*PHI	135	1966–67
1967–68	John Havlicek*BOS	142	Bill Russell*BOS	672	Bob Cousy*BOS	937	John Havlicek*BOS	142	1967–68
1968–69	Jerry West*LAL	135	Bill Russell*BOS	770	Bob Cousy*BOS	937	John Havlicek*BOS	142	1968–69
1969–70	Walt Frazier*NYK	156	Bob Cousy*BOS	937	Bob Cousy*BOS	937	Walt Frazier*NYK	156	1969–70
1970–71	Oscar Robertson*MIL	124	Jerry West*LAL	703	Bob Cousy*BOS	937	Walt Frazier*NYK	156	1970–71
1971–72	Jerry West*LAL	134	Jerry West*LAL	837	Bob Cousy*BOS	937	Walt Frazier*NYK	156	1971–72
1972–73	Jerry West*LAL	132	Jerry West*LAL	969	Jerry West*LAL	969	Walt Frazier*NYK	156	1972–73
1973–74	Oscar Robertson*MIL	149	Jerry West*LAL	970	Jerry West*LAL	970	Walt Frazier*NYK	156	1973–74
1974–75	Kevin PorterWSB	124	John Havlicek*BOS	712	Jerry West*LAL	970	Walt Frazier*NYK	156	1974–75
1975–76	Jo Jo White*BOS Alvan AdamsPHO	98	John Havlicek*BOS	763	Jerry West*LAL	970	Walt Frazier*NYK	156	1975–76
1976–77	Bill Walton*POR	104	John Havlicek*BOS	825	Jerry West*LAL	970	Walt Frazier*NYK	156	1976–77
1977–78	Tom HendersonWSB	106	John Havlicek*BOS	825	Jerry West*LAL	970	Walt Frazier*NYK	156	1977–78
1978–79	Tom HendersonWSB	107	Walt Frazier*CLE	599	Jerry West*LAL	970	Walt Frazier*NYK	156	1978–79
1979–80	Magic Johnson*LAL	151	Walt Frazier*CLE	599	Jerry West*LAL	970	Walt Frazier*NYK	156	1979–80
1980–81	Maurice Cheeks*PHI	116	Wes Unseld*WSB	453	Jerry West*LAL	970	Walt Frazier*NYK	156	1980–81
1981–82	Maurice Cheeks*PHI	172	Maurice Cheeks*PHI	462	Jerry West*LAL	970	Maurice Cheeks*PHI	172	1981–82
1982–83	Magic Johnson*LAL	192	Maurice Cheeks*PHI	553	Jerry West*LAL	970	Magic Johnson*LAL	192	1982–83
1983–84	Magic Johnson*LAL	284	Magic Johnson*LAL	778	Jerry West*LAL	970	Magic Johnson*LAL	284	1983–84
1984–85	Magic Johnson*LAL	289	Magic Johnson*LAL	1,067	Magic Johnson*LAL	1,067	Magic Johnson*LAL	289	1984–85
1985–86	Magic Johnson*LAL	211	Magic Johnson*LAL	1,278	Magic Johnson*LAL	1,278	Magic Johnson*LAL	289	1985–86
1986–87	Magic Johnson*LAL	219	Magic Johnson*LAL	1,497	Magic Johnson*LAL	1,497	Magic Johnson*LAL	289	1986–87
1987–88	Magic Johnson*LAL	303	Magic Johnson*LAL	1,800	Magic Johnson*LAL	1,800	Magic Johnson*LAL	303	1987–88
1988–89	Magic Johnson*LAL	165	Magic Johnson*LAL	1,965	Magic Johnson*LAL	1,965	Magic Johnson*LAL	303	1988–89
1989–90	Kevin JohnsonPHO	170	Magic Johnson*LAL	2,080	Magic Johnson*LAL	2,080	Magic Johnson*LAL	303	1989–90
1990–91	Magic Johnson*LAL	240	Magic Johnson*LAL	2,320	Magic Johnson*LAL	2,320	Magic Johnson*LAL	303	1990–91
1991–92	John Stockton*UTA	217	Larry Bird*BOS	1,062	Magic Johnson*LAL	2,320	Magic Johnson*LAL	303	1991–92
1992–93	Kevin JohnsonPHO	182	Isiah Thomas*DET	987	Magic Johnson*LAL	2,320	Magic Johnson*LAL	303	1992–93
1993–94	John Stockton*UTA	157	Isiah Thomas*DET	987	Magic Johnson*LAL	2,320	Magic Johnson*LAL	303	1993–94
1994–95	Penny HardawayORL	162	John Stockton*UTA	980	Magic Johnson*LAL	2,320	Magic Johnson*LAL	303	1994–95
1995–96	John Stockton*UTA	195	Magic Johnson*LAL	2,346	Magic Johnson*LAL	2,346	Magic Johnson*LAL	303	1995–96
1996–97	John Stockton*UTA	191	John Stockton*UTA	1,366	Magic Johnson*LAL	2,346	Magic Johnson*LAL	303	1996–97
1997–98	John Stockton*UTA	155	John Stockton*UTA	1,521	Magic Johnson*LAL	2,346	Magic Johnson*LAL	303	1997–98
1998–99	Avery JohnsonSAS	126	John Stockton*UTA	1,613	Magic Johnson*LAL	2,346	Magic Johnson*LAL	303	1998–99
1999–00	Mark JacksonIND	178	John Stockton*UTA	1,716	Magic Johnson*LAL	2,346	Magic Johnson*LAL	303	1999–00
2000–01	Allen Iverson*PHI	134	John Stockton*UTA	1,773	Magic Johnson*LAL	2,346	Magic Johnson*LAL	303	2000–01
2001–02	Jason Kidd*NJN	182	John Stockton*UTA	1,813	Magic Johnson*LAL	2,346	Magic Johnson*LAL	303	2001–02
2002–03	Jason Kidd*NJN	163	John Stockton*UTA	1,839	Magic Johnson*LAL	2,346	Magic Johnson*LAL	303	2002–03
2003–04	Chauncey Billups*DET	136	Scottie Pippen*CHI	1,048	Magic Johnson*LAL	2,346	Magic Johnson*LAL	303	2003–04
2004–05	Steve Nash*PHO	170	Gary Payton*; BOS 2004–05; MIA 2005–06	772	Magic Johnson*LAL	2,346	Magic Johnson*LAL	303	2004–05
2005–06	Steve Nash*PHO	204	Gary Payton*; BOS 2004–05; MIA 2005–06	808	Magic Johnson*LAL	2,346	Magic Johnson*LAL	303	2005–06
2006–07	LeBron James^CLE	159	Jason Kidd*; NJN 2006–07; DAL 2008–12; NYK 2012–13	927	Magic Johnson*LAL	2,346	Magic Johnson*LAL	303	2006–07
2007–08	Rajon RondoBOS	172	Jason Kidd*; NJN 2006–07; DAL 2008–12; NYK 2012–13	961	Magic Johnson*LAL	2,346	Magic Johnson*LAL	303	2007–08
2008–09	Rajon RondoBOS	137	Jason Kidd*; NJN 2006–07; DAL 2008–12; NYK 2012–13	1,020	Magic Johnson*LAL	2,346	Magic Johnson*LAL	303	2008–09
2009–10	Rajon RondoBOS	223	Jason Kidd*; NJN 2006–07; DAL 2008–12; NYK 2012–13	1,062	Magic Johnson*LAL	2,346	Magic Johnson*LAL	303	2009–10
2010–11	Jason Kidd*DAL	153	Jason Kidd*; NJN 2006–07; DAL 2008–12; NYK 2012–13	1,215	Magic Johnson*LAL	2,346	Magic Johnson*LAL	303	2010–11
2011–12	Rajon RondoBOS	227	Jason Kidd*; NJN 2006–07; DAL 2008–12; NYK 2012–13	1,239	Magic Johnson*LAL	2,346	Magic Johnson*LAL	303	2011–12
2012–13	LeBron James^MIA	152	Jason Kidd*; NJN 2006–07; DAL 2008–12; NYK 2012–13	1,263	Magic Johnson*LAL	2,346	Magic Johnson*LAL	303	2012–13
2013–14	Russell Westbrook^{†}OKC	153	Steve Nash*LAL	1,061	Magic Johnson*LAL	2,346	Magic Johnson*LAL	303	2013–14
2014–15	LeBron James^CLE	169	LeBron James^ CLE 2014–18; LAL 2018–26	1,188	Magic Johnson*LAL	2,346	Magic Johnson*LAL	303	2014–15
2015–16	Russell Westbrook^{†}OKC	198	LeBron James^ CLE 2014–18; LAL 2018–26	1,348	Magic Johnson*LAL	2,346	Magic Johnson*LAL	303	2015–16
2016–17	LeBron James^CLE	141	LeBron James^ CLE 2014–18; LAL 2018–26	1,489	Magic Johnson*LAL	2,346	Magic Johnson*LAL	303	2016–17
2017–18	LeBron James^CLE	198	LeBron James^ CLE 2014–18; LAL 2018–26	1,687	Magic Johnson*LAL	2,346	Magic Johnson*LAL	303	2017–18
2018–19	Draymond Green^GSW	187	LeBron James^ CLE 2014–18; LAL 2018–26	1,687	Magic Johnson*LAL	2,346	Magic Johnson*LAL	303	2018–19
2019–20	LeBron James^LAL	184	LeBron James^ CLE 2014–18; LAL 2018–26	1,871	Magic Johnson*LAL	2,346	Magic Johnson*LAL	303	2019–20
2020–21	Jrue Holiday^MIL	199	LeBron James^ CLE 2014–18; LAL 2018–26	1,919	Magic Johnson*LAL	2,346	Magic Johnson*LAL	303	2020–21
2021–22	Jayson Tatum^BOS	148	LeBron James^ CLE 2014–18; LAL 2018–26	1,919	Magic Johnson*LAL	2,346	Magic Johnson*LAL	303	2021–22
2022–23	Nikola Jokić^DEN	190	LeBron James^ CLE 2014–18; LAL 2018–26	2,023	Magic Johnson*LAL	2,346	Magic Johnson*LAL	303	2022–23
2023–24	Luka Dončić^DAL	178	LeBron James^ CLE 2014–18; LAL 2018–26	2,067	Magic Johnson*LAL	2,346	Magic Johnson*LAL	303	2023–24
2024–25	Tyrese Haliburton^IND	197	LeBron James^ CLE 2014–18; LAL 2018–26	2,095	Magic Johnson*LAL	2,346	Magic Johnson*LAL	303	2024–25
2025–26	Stephon Castle^SAS	141	LeBron James^ CLE 2014–18; LAL 2018–26	2,168	Magic Johnson*LAL	2,346	Magic Johnson*LAL	303	2025–26
Season	Year-by-year leader	AST	Active player leader	AST	Career record	AST	Single-season record	AST	Season

== See also ==
- Basketball statistics
- NBA post-season records
