= Howie Dallmar =

American basketball player and coach (1922–1991)

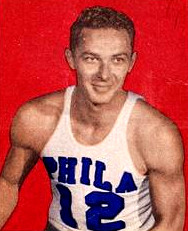
- Dallmar in 1948

Personal information
- Born: May 4, 1922 San Francisco, California, U.S.
- Died: December 19, 1991 (aged 69) San Francisco, California, U.S.
- Listed height: 6 ft 4 in (1.93 m)
- Listed weight: 200 lb (91 kg)

Career information
- High school: Lowell (San Francisco, California)
- College: Stanford (1941–1943); Penn (1944–1945)
- Playing career: 1946–1949
- Position: Forward
- Number: 12

Career history

Playing
- 1946–1949: Philadelphia Warriors

Coaching
- 1948–1954: Penn
- 1954–1975: Stanford

Career highlights
- BAA champion (1947); All-BAA First Team (1948); NCAA champion (1942); NCAA final Four MOP (1942); Consensus second-team All-American (1945); California Mr. Basketball (1940)
- Stats at NBA.com
- Stats at Basketball Reference

Howard Dallmar (May 24, 1922 – December 19, 1991) was an American professional basketball player and coach.

A 6-foot-4-inch (193 cm) forward from San Francisco, California, Dallmar played collegiately at Stanford University. He led Stanford to the 1942 NCAA Championship, earning Tournament Most Outstanding Player honors. After transferring to Penn, he was an All-American selection in 1945.

From 1946 to 1949, he played professionally for the Philadelphia Warriors of the Basketball Association of America (a forerunner to the NBA). Dallmar was the third leading scorer (behind Joe Fulks and Angelo Musi) on the team which won the 1947 BAA Championship. In the 1947–48 season, Dallmar led the BAA in total assists and was named to the All-BAA First Team.

Dallmar coached the University of Pennsylvania basketball team from 1948 to 1954, before returning to Stanford as head basketball coach in 1954. He remained at Stanford for 21 seasons, compiling a 256–264 record. He died of congestive heart failure in 1991.

== BAA career statistics ==
Legend
| GP | Games played | GS | Games started | MPG | Minutes per game |
| FG% | Field goal percentage | 3P% | 3-point field goal percentage | FT% | Free throw percentage |
| RPG | Rebounds per game | APG | Assists per game | SPG | Steals per game |
| BPG | Blocks per game | PPG | Points per game | **Bold** | Career high |
| † | Won an NBA championship |

=== Regular season ===
| Year | Team | GP | FG% | FT% | APG | PPG |
|---|---|---|---|---|---|---|
| 1946–47† | Philadelphia | **60** | .280 | .640 | 1.7 | 8.8 |
| 1947–48 | Philadelphia | 48 | .275 | **.744** | 2.5 | **12.2** |
| 1948–49 | Philadelphia | 38 | **.307** | .716 | **3.1** | 7.7 |
| Career | | 146 | .283 | .698 | 2.3 | 9.6 |

=== Playoffs ===
| Year | Team | GP | FG% | FT% | APG | PPG |
|---|---|---|---|---|---|---|
| 1947† | Philadelphia | 10 | **.250** | **.750** | 1.6 | **8.2** |
| 1948 | Philadelphia | **13** | .213 | .625 | **2.8** | **8.2** |
| 1949 | Philadelphia | 2 | .222 | .714 | 2.0 | 6.5 |
| Career | | 25 | .227 | .684 | 2.3 | 8.0 |

== Head coaching record ==
Record table
| Season | Team | Overall | Conference | Standing | Postseason |
|---|---|---|---|---|---|
**Penn Quakers** (Eastern Intercollegiate Basketball League) (1948–1954)
| 1948–49 | Penn | 15–8 | 8–4 | T–2nd | |
| 1949–50 | Penn | 11–14 | 4–8 | 5th | |
| 1950–51 | Penn | 19–8 | 7–5 | 3rd | |
| 1951–52 | Penn | 21–8 | 9–3 | 2nd | |
| 1952–53 | Penn | 22–5 | 10–2 | 1st | NCAA Regional Third Place |
| 1953–54 | Penn | 17–8 | 10–4 | 3rd | |
| Penn: | | 105–51 (.673) | 48–26 (.649) | | |
**Stanford Indians** (Pacific Coast Conference) (1954–1959)
| 1954–55 | Stanford | 16–8 | 7–5 | 2nd | |
| 1955–56 | Stanford | 18–6 | 10–6 | T–3rd | |
| 1956–57 | Stanford | 11–15 | 7–9 | 5th | |
| 1957–58 | Stanford | 12–13 | 7–9 | 6th | |
| 1958–59 | Stanford | 15–9 | 10–6 | T–3rd | |
**Stanford Indians / Cardinals** (Athletic Association of Western Universities / Pacific–8 Conference) (1959–1975)
| 1959–60 | Stanford | 11–14 | 4–7 | 4th | |
| 1960–61 | Stanford | 7–17 | 3–9 | 5th | |
| 1961–62 | Stanford | 16–6 | 8–4 | 2nd | |
| 1962–63 | Stanford | 16–9 | 7–5 | T–1st | |
| 1963–64 | Stanford | 15–10 | 9–6 | 2nd | |
| 1964–65 | Stanford | 15–8 | 9–5 | 2nd | |
| 1965–66 | Stanford | 13–12 | 8–6 | 3rd | |
| 1966–67 | Stanford | 15–11 | 7–7 | 4th | |
| 1967–68 | Stanford | 10–15 | 5–9 | T–5th | |
| 1968–69 | Stanford | 8–17 | 4–10 | T–7th | |
| 1969–70 | Stanford | 5–20 | 2–12 | 8th | |
| 1970–71 | Stanford | 6–20 | 2–12 | T–7th | |
| 1971–72 | Stanford | 10–15 | 5–9 | 6th | |
| 1972–73 | Stanford | 14–11 | 7–7 | 4th | |
| 1973–74 | Stanford | 11–14 | 5–9 | 6th | |
| 1974–75 | Stanford | 12–14 | 6–8 | T–5th | |
| Stanford: | | 256–264 (.492) | 132–160 (.452) | | |
| Total: | | 361–315 (.534) | | | |
National champion Postseason invitational champion Conference regular season champion Conference regular season and conference tournament champion Division regular season champion Division regular season and conference tournament champion Conference tournament champion
