= NBA assists leaders =

NBA assists leader may refer to:

- List of National Basketball Association annual assists leaders
- List of National Basketball Association career assists leaders
- List of National Basketball Association career playoff assists leaders
- List of National Basketball Association single-game assists leaders
