= Art Hillhouse =

American basketball player

Personal information
- Born: June 12, 1916 Rutherford, New Jersey, U.S.
- Died: October 27, 1980 (aged 64)
- Listed height: 6 ft 7 in (2.01 m)
- Listed weight: 220 lb (100 kg)

Career information
- High school: Rutherford (Rutherford, New Jersey)
- College: LIU Brooklyn (1934–1939)
- Playing career: 1943–1949
- Position: Center
- Number: 18

Career history
- 1943–1946: Philadelphia Sphas
- 1946–1948: Philadelphia Warriors
- 1948: Wilkes-Barre Barons
- 1948–1949: Lancaster Red Roses

Career highlights
- BAA champion (1947); Second-team All-American – MSG (1939)
- Stats at NBA.com
- Stats at Basketball Reference

Arthur Sherwood Hillhouse (June 12, 1916 – October 27, 1980) was an American professional basketball player.

A 6'7" center from Long Island University, Hillhouse played two seasons (1946–1948) in the Basketball Association of America as a member of the Philadelphia Warriors. He averaged 5.9 points per game in his BAA career and won a league championship in 1947. During the 1947 BAA Finals, Hillhouse set a still-standing NBA record by becoming the only player to foul out of every game of a 5-game playoff series.

== BAA career statistics ==
Legend
GP	Games played	GS	Games started	MPG	Minutes per game
FG%	Field goal percentage	3P%	3-point field goal percentage	FT%	Free throw percentage
RPG	Rebounds per game	APG	Assists per game	SPG	Steals per game
BPG	Blocks per game	PPG	Points per game	**Bold**	Career high
†	Won an NBA championship

=== Regular season ===
Year	Team	GP	FG%	FT%	APG	PPG
1946–47†	Philadelphia	**60**	**.291**	.723	**.7**	**6.0**
1947–48	Philadelphia	11	.197	**.811**	.3	5.3
Career		71	.277	.739	.6	5.9

=== Playoffs ===
Year	Team	GP	FG%	FT%	APG	PPG
1947†	Philadelphia	10	.264	.848	.8	8.7
Career		10	.264	.848	.8	8.7
