= 1948–49 Philadelphia Warriors season =

BAA professional basketball team season

- Head coach: Eddie Gottlieb
- Arena: Philadelphia Arena

Results
- Record: 28–32 (.467)
- Place: Division: 4th (Eastern)
- Playoff finish: East Division Semifinals (eliminated 0–2)
- Stats at Basketball Reference

Local media
- Television: WFIL-TV
- Radio: WIBG

The 1948–49 Philadelphia Warriors season was the Warriors' 3rd season in the Basketball Association of America. The team finished at fourth place out of six teams in the BAA East Division and was eliminated in the East Division Semifinals by the Washington Capitols in two games. The team was led by power forward Joe Fulks, who averaged a team-high 26.0 points per game and set the then-NBA record for points in a game, with 63 points versus the Indianapolis Jets on February 10, 1949.

== Draft ==
Round	Pick	Player	Position	Nationality	College
1	11	Don Ray	F/C	United States	Western Kentucky
–	–	William Brown	–	United States	Maryland
–	–	Hugh Compton	–	United States	Louisville
–	–	Joe Nelson	–	United States	BYU
–	–	Clint Pace	–	United States	Pepperdine
–	–	Roy Pugh	F/C	United States	SMU
–	–	Tom Short	–	United States	Kansas Wesleyan
–	–	Joe Wahl	–	United States	Akron
–	–	Andy Wolfe	–	United States	California

== Roster ==
1948–49 Philadelphia Warriors roster
Players

Pos.	No.	Player	Height	Weight	DOB	From
F	11	Gale Bishop	6 ft 3 in (1.91 m)	195 lb (88 kg)	1922-06-04	Washington State
F/C	15	Jake Bornheimer	6 ft 5 in (1.96 m)	200 lb (91 kg)	1927-06-29	Muhlenberg
G	4	Chink Crossin	6 ft 1 in (1.85 m)	165 lb (75 kg)	1924-07-04	Penn
F	12	Howie Dallmar	6 ft 4 in (1.93 m)	200 lb (91 kg)	1922-05-24	Stanford
F	15	Phil Farbman	6 ft 1 in (1.85 m)	185 lb (84 kg)	1924-04-03	CCNY
SG	6, 9	Jerry Fleishman	6 ft 2 in (1.88 m)	190 lb (86 kg)	1922-02-14	NYU
PF	10	Joe Fulks	6 ft 5 in (1.96 m)	190 lb (86 kg)	1921-10-26	Murray State
C	17	Elmore Morgenthaler	6 ft 9 in (2.06 m)	230 lb (104 kg)	1922-08-03	New Mexico Tech
G	5	Angelo Musi	5 ft 9 in (1.75 m)	145 lb (66 kg)	1918-07-25	Temple
F	7	Bob O'Brien	6 ft 4 in (1.93 m)	190 lb (86 kg)	1927-01-26	Pepperdine
F/C	16	Roy Pugh	6 ft 6 in (1.98 m)	210 lb (95 kg)	1922-10-16	SMU
G	6	Jerry Rullo	5 ft 10 in (1.78 m)	165 lb (75 kg)	1923-06-23	Temple
C	14	Ed Sadowski	6 ft 5 in (1.96 m)	240 lb (109 kg)	1917-07-11	Seton Hall
PG	8	George Senesky	6 ft 2 in (1.88 m)	179 lb (81 kg)	1922-04-04	Saint Joseph's
F	16	Irv Torgoff	6 ft 2 in (1.88 m)	192 lb (87 kg)	1917-03-06	Long Island

Coaches
Head coach

Eddie Gottlieb

Legend
- (DP) Unsigned draft pick
- (FA) Free agent
- (S) Suspended
- Injured

Roster

== Regular season ==
=== Season standings ===
#	Eastern Division				
#	Team	W	L	PCT	GB
1	x-Washington Capitols	38	22	.633	–
2	x-New York Knicks	32	28	.533	6
3	x-Baltimore Bullets	29	31	.483	9
4	x-Philadelphia Warriors	28	32	.467	10
5	Boston Celtics	25	35	.417	13
6	Providence Steamrollers	12	48	.200	26

x – clinched playoff spot

=== Game log ===
#	Date	Opponent	Score	High points	Record
1	November 3	@ Washington	70–77	Joe Fulks (24)	0–1
2	November 4	Boston	94–73	Joe Fulks (25)	1–1
3	November 6	@ Providence	69–56	Joe Fulks (26)	2–1
4	November 7	@ Boston	77–85	Joe Fulks (20)	2–2
5	November 9	Providence	92–84	Joe Fulks (27)	3–2
6	November 11	Rochester	75–83	Ed Sadowski (18)	3–3
7	November 13	@ St. Louis	75–76	Ed Sadowski (23)	3–4
8	November 16	@ Indianapolis	90–82	Ed Sadowski (21)	4–4
9	November 17	@ Fort Wayne	72–80	Ed Sadowski (24)	4–5
10	November 18	Indianapolis	83–71	Dallmar, Fulks, Sadowski (12)	5–5
11	November 20	@ New York	86–91	Fulks, Sadowski (26)	5–6
12	November 23	Fort Wayne	80–90	Joe Fulks (22)	5–7
13	November 25	Washington	73–81	Joe Fulks (28)	5–8
14	November 28	@ Minneapolis	67–88	Joe Fulks (15)	5–9
15	November 30	@ Chicago	68–74	Fleishman, Fulks (13)	5–10
16	December 2	Boston	87–88	Joe Fulks (32)	5–11
17	December 4	@ Rochester	101–105 (OT)	Joe Fulks (39)	5–12
18	December 8	Baltimore	78–83	Joe Fulks (25)	5–13
19	December 9	@ Baltimore	91–92	Joe Fulks (20)	5–14
20	December 14	St. Louis	74–61	Joe Fulks (23)	6–14
21	December 15	@ Washington	81–92	Joe Fulks (26)	6–15
22	December 17	New York	87–78	Joe Fulks (27)	7–15
23	December 18	@ Providence	94–90	Joe Fulks (47)	8–15
24	December 21	Minneapolis	72–64	Joe Fulks (19)	9–15
25	December 25	Boston	80–77	Joe Fulks (30)	10–15
26	December 30	Indianapolis	94–91	Joe Fulks (32)	11–15
27	January 1	@ New York	80–88	Joe Fulks (25)	11–16
28	January 4	Washington	78–84	Joe Fulks (27)	11–17
29	January 6	@ Baltimore	88–93	Ed Sadowski (24)	11–18
30	January 8	Fort Wayne	67–73	Joe Fulks (20)	11–19
31	January 11	@ Rochester	71–83	Joe Fulks (20)	11–20
32	January 14	@ Boston	104–79	Joe Fulks (31)	12–20
33	January 15	Baltimore	94–87	Joe Fulks (26)	13–20
34	January 18	Providence	86–74	Joe Fulks (34)	14–20
35	January 20	Chicago	92–72	Joe Fulks (38)	15–20
36	January 23	@ Minneapolis	71–89	Joe Fulks (32)	15–21
37	January 25	@ Chicago	86–77	Joe Fulks (35)	16–21
38	January 26	@ Fort Wayne	80–88	Joe Fulks (30)	16–22
39	January 27	New York	102–96	Joe Fulks (39)	17–22
40	January 29	@ New York	78–73	Joe Fulks (27)	18–22
41	February 1	Providence	93–86	Joe Fulks (28)	19–22
42	February 3	Minneapolis	76–78	Joe Fulks (23)	19–23
43	February 6	@ St. Louis	77–74 (OT)	Joe Fulks (20)	20–23
44	February 7	@ Indianapolis	73–90	Joe Fulks (28)	20–24
45	February 8	vs Fort Wayne	87–89	Ed Sadowski (27)	20–25
46	February 10	Indianapolis	108–87	Joe Fulks (63)	21–25
47	February 12	@ Washington	91–88	Joe Fulks (31)	22–25
48	February 17	New York	86–82	Joe Fulks (36)	23–25
49	February 22	@ Rochester	86–92	Ed Sadowski (23)	23–26
50	February 23	Chicago	85–102	Joe Fulks (21)	23–27
51	March 1	St. Louis	89–83	Joe Fulks (23)	24–27
52	March 3	Chicago	90–75	Ed Sadowski (18)	25–27
53	March 5	@ Baltimore	85–99	Joe Fulks (23)	25–28
54	March 10	Rochester	71–73	Joe Fulks (29)	25–29
55	March 11	@ Boston	100–108	Joe Fulks (23)	25–30
56	March 12	@ Providence	92–70	Joe Fulks (39)	26–30
57	March 15	Baltimore	84–76	Joe Fulks (28)	27–30
58	March 17	Washington	84–81	Joe Fulks (25)	28–30
59	March 19	@ St. Louis	100–109	Joe Fulks (31)	28–31
60	March 20	@ Minneapolis	78–91	Joe Fulks (18)	28–32

== Playoffs ==
1949 playoff game log
Division Semifinals: 0–2 (home: 0–1; road: 0–1)

Game	Date	Team	Score	High points	High assists	Location	Series
1	March 23	Washington	L 70–92	Jake Bornheimer (13)	Howie Dallmar (3)	Philadelphia Arena	0–1
2	March 24	@ Washington	L 78–80	Chink Crossin (22)	Jerry Fleishman (3)	Uline Arena	0–2

1949 schedule

== Awards and records ==
- Joe Fulks, All-NBA First Team
