= Eddie Gottlieb =

Ukrainian-American basketball coach and executive (1898–1979)

Personal information
- Born: September 15, 1898 Kiev, Kiev Governorate, Russian Empire (now Kyiv, Ukraine)
- Died: December 7, 1979 (aged 81) Philadelphia, Pennsylvania, U.S.
- Listed height: 5 ft 8 in (1.73 m)
- Listed weight: 175 lb (79 kg)

Career information
- High school: South Philadelphia
- Coaching career: 1917–1955

Career history

Coaching
- 1917–1946: Philadelphia Sphas
- 1946–1955: Philadelphia Warriors

Career highlights
- As coach: BAA champion (1947); 7× ABL champion (1934, 1936, 1937, 1940, 1941, 1943, 1945); 3x EBL champion (1930–1932); Philadelphia Basket Ball League champion (1925); Philadelphia League champion (1924)

Career coaching record
- BAA/NBA: 263–318 (.453)
- Record at Basketball Reference
- Basketball Hall of Fame

Edward Gottlieb (born Isadore Gottlieb; September 15, 1898 – December 7, 1979) was an American professional basketball coach and executive. Nicknamed "Mr. Basketball" and "the Mogul", he was the first coach and manager of the Philadelphia Warriors of the National Basketball Association (NBA), and later became the owner of the team from 1951 to 1962. He was elected to the Naismith Memorial Basketball Hall of Fame as a contributor on April 20, 1972. The NBA Rookie of the Year Award, the Eddie Gottlieb Trophy, was formerly named after him before being renamed after superstar center Wilt Chamberlain by 2022 after the final Eddie Gottlieb Trophy was given out to Scottie Barnes of the Toronto Raptors that year.

Gottlieb organized, and played for, the South Philadelphia Hebrew Association teams in the 1920s. He was in charge of semipro baseball in Philadelphia, financed and partly owned the Negro league Philadelphia Stars, and made the schedule for the Negro National League. He also helped coordinate the overseas tours of the Harlem Globetrotters. Along with a few other sports promoters, he organized the Basketball Association of America (BAA), the league that later became the NBA. Gottlieb coached the original Philadelphia Warriors, bought the team, and sent it to San Francisco in order to expand the game westward. He headed the NBA rules committee for 25 years and was solely in charge of NBA scheduling for the last three decades of his life. Fellow Hall of Famer Harry Litwack stated: "Gottlieb was about as important to the game of basketball as the basketball."

== Early life ==
Gottlieb was involved with sports throughout his life. Born Isadore Gottlieb in 1898 in Kiev, he moved with his family to Philadelphia at the age of ten. He graduated from South Philadelphia High School in 1916 for whom he played quarterback. By the time he was a young adult he had not only played on but had also coached, owned, and operated neighborhood sports teams.

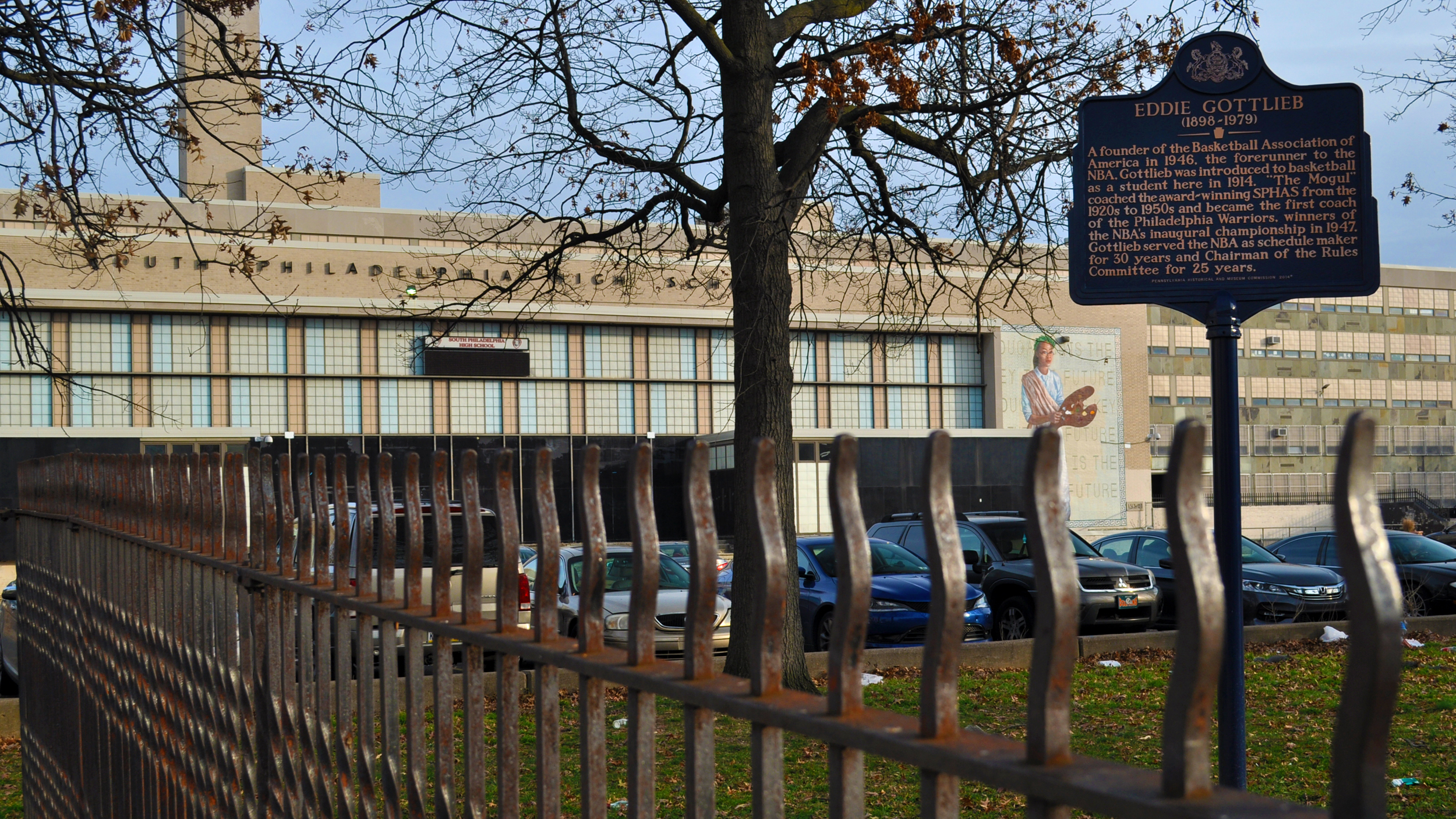
Eddie Gottlieb Historical Marker - South Philadelphia High School - 2101 S Broad St Philadelphia PA

He was, by his own admission, a born promoter and organizer, and changed his name to Edward. In 1917, when he was 19, Gottlieb alongside two of his old high school basketball teammates in Edwin "Hughie" Black and Herman "Chickie" Passon organized a team of mostly Jewish players (including themselves during at least their first season of play) representing the Young Men's Hebrew Association, which supplied the team with uniforms for three years (though only using the local Y.M.H.A. name for only their first season of play). The players later found a new sponsor with the South Philadelphia Hebrew Association, a social club from which the team derived its new identity, the Philadelphia Sphas. The team wore uniforms with the acronym SPHAs sewn across the chest in Hebrew letters. Even after the association stopped providing the uniforms, the team kept the unusual name. Having no home court during this time, the team nicknamed themselves "the Wandering Jews".

In the early days of the SPHAs, a game was as much a social event. "We played in a lot of dance halls in those early years", Gottlieb told The Associated Press. "It was basketball, then dancing. A very nice Saturday evening for yourself and your date. We used to let the girls in for free, because you couldn't have a dance after the game without the girls. We had no trouble getting the guys to pay for the basketball game when they heard that news."

The SPHAs became one of the powerhouses of basketball in the East. The team entered the Philadelphia League and won two consecutive championships, the final two in the league's history. The SPHAs then joined the Eastern League, which went out of business in the same season, forcing the team to book its own games.

Gottlieb, an entrepreneur and future schedule maker, had no trouble lining up a series of exhibition games against teams from both New York's Metropolitan League and the American Basketball League, which in 1925–26 began operation as the country's first major professional basketball league.

The SPHAs won five of six games against ABL teams in 1925–26, losing only to the league's top club, the Cleveland Rosenblums. The SPHAs then defeated two of the game's best touring squads, the New York Original Celtics and the New York Renaissance Five (Rens), in best-of-three series. In about six weeks, Gottlieb's team had won nine of 11 contests against the most celebrated squads in basketball.

For the next two years Gottlieb devoted his energy to the Philadelphia Warriors, a 1926–27 ABL entry. The Warriors, who featured former SPHAs stars Chick Passon and Stretch Meehan, competed in the ABL for two seasons, posting winning records both years. The ABL, its decline hastened by the Great Depression, shut down two seasons later, in 1931. Meanwhile, Gottlieb had rebuilt the SPHAs in 1929 with younger talent, and in 1933 the team joined the ABL, which had reorganized as a smaller, regional circuit after a two-year hiatus.

The clubs in this reincarnation of the ABL played in small arenas, armories, and dance halls, much as teams had in the early 1920s. The SPHAs were the premier team, winning championships in three of the league's first four seasons and taking titles in 7 of 15 years. The club stayed together for 31 years, until 1949, when Gottlieb became too involved with the new Basketball Association of America. Gottlieb sold the SPHAs to Red Klotz in 1950.

== BAA and NBA ==
In the spring of 1946, the United States was celebrating the end of World War II, which had formally ended in September 1945. Peace brought the population leisure time and money for entertainment, and basketball was ripe for a move to the big time. College basketball had grown immensely in popularity during the previous 10 years, and there was no professional basketball circuit (as hockey had with the National Hockey League).

The National Basketball League was operating primarily in the Midwest, and did not attract the attention of other cities where basketball was popular, such as New York, Philadelphia, and Boston—which, for nearly half a century, had been the hotbeds of barnstorming teams and fly-by-night leagues. The owners or operators of major arenas in some of the country's biggest cities were looking for events to help fill their schedules. They met in New York City in 1946 and created the 11-team Basketball Association of America. The league was fashioned after the National Hockey League, with a 60-game schedule followed by championship playoffs.

Of the original 11 teams, only three still survive in the present-day NBA: the Boston Celtics, the New York Knickerbockers, and the Philadelphia (now Golden State) Warriors. Gottlieb was the coach and general manager of the Philadelphia Warriors. Besides coaching, he made sure the team stayed afloat during the rocky days of the BAA and the NBA. "He promoted the team on street corners and he sold tickets and then he counted the cold house", Mike Lupica wrote after Gottlieb's death.

Gottlieb coached the Warriors for a total of nine seasons, compiling a 263–318 regular-season career record and going 15–17 in the playoffs. The Warriors finished at .500 or better in four of their first six campaigns, but in Gottlieb's last three seasons they compiled losing records and failed to make the playoffs. During his coaching years, from 1946/47 to 1954/55, his teams included such early NBA standouts as Paul Arizin and Neil Johnston.

Gottlieb won his lone championship with the Warriors in the first term of the BAA, 1946–47. Behind "Jumping Joe" Fulks, who led the league with 23.2 points per game, the Warriors logged a 35–25 regular-season record, second to the Washington Capitols in the Eastern Division. In the playoffs the Warriors defeated New York, the St. Louis Bombers, and the Chicago Stags for the title. Gottlieb and rivaling Stags coach Harold Olsen would be the first rookie coaches to compete in the championship match-ups, with such a feat not happening again until the 2015 NBA Finals with Steve Kerr of the Warriors (now in Golden State) and David Blatt of the Cleveland Cavaliers both competing for their first championships in their rookie coaching seasons in the NBA.

In the league's second season the BAA lost four teams and picked up another one. The Warriors edged the Knicks by a single game in the regular season and then lost in six in the BAA Finals to the league's newest entrant, the Baltimore Bullets. For the 1949/50 season, the BAA merged with the NBL to form the NBA, a marriage in which Gottlieb was influential. "When anyone inside the league or outside had a question, they went to Gotty", said Leonard Koppett, who covered the NBA for the New York Post and The New York Times. For the next three seasons the Warriors lost in the first round of the playoffs without winning a game.

Gottlieb, who was instrumental in helping original Warriors owner Peter A. Tyrrell launch the franchise, bought the club in 1952 for $25,000. He also had a major role in shaping the league's rules, serving as chairman of the rules committee for 25 years. He was there when Syracuse Nationals owner Danny Biasone came up with the idea of a 24-second shot clock in 1954, and he helped to implement a rule that gave a bonus free throw after six team fouls in a quarter. The new rules supplied the framework for a more fast-paced and exciting game and were pivotal in the continued existence and eventual success of the NBA.

"I probably was responsible for more rule changes in pro basketball than any other man", Gottlieb told the Associated Press late in his life. "They call me in now because I’m the only one left who can connect things to the past, who knows why this rule was put in or why that one was thrown out."

Gottlieb was behind the NBA's "territorial draft" rule, which gave teams the right to claim a local college or high school player in exchange for giving up their first-round draft pick. The rule was particularly advantageous for Philadelphia, which landed Overbrook High School's Wilt Chamberlain in 1959 after his stints with the University of Kansas and the Harlem Globetrotters.

Chamberlain furthered the franchise's success. An immediate drawing card, he led the NBA in scoring and rebounding as a rookie and helped the Warriors to a 49–26 record and a trip to the division semifinals. With the Warriors for five full seasons (he was traded during his sixth season), Chamberlain took the team to the playoffs four times. In 1961/62 Philadelphia fell to Boston in seven games in the Eastern Division Finals.

Before the 1962/63 season the Warriors moved west. Gottlieb, who had purchased the franchise 10 years earlier, sold it for a $600,000 profit to a credit card company, which kept 33.3 percent of the ownership while Franklin Mieuli put together a group of almost 40 Bay Area investors to purchase the remainder of the team. The move to San Francisco followed the Minneapolis Lakers' migration to Los Angeles two seasons earlier, and helped open the west to professional basketball.

Gottlieb remained involved with the team in San Francisco before "retiring" in 1964. However, he retained his leadership position with the NBA. His role was crucial: the job of planning the league schedule had become solely his. "They joked that Eddie Gottlieb carried the NBA around in his briefcase", Lupica wrote.

In any July or August, a visit to Gottlieb's office would find him in front of stacks of paper, a yellow legal pad, and graph paper. "Gottlieb's skin would be the color of the yellow paper, and his eyes would look like black holes", Lupica wrote. "But he was making a season, as always."

Gottlieb was the force behind the NBA schedule until shortly before his death. As other leagues began to use computers to build neutral schedules, the NBA continued to rely on Gottlieb and trust his human intuition. For 1978/79, the season prior to his death, he reluctantly gave up his duties to a software program.

A lifelong bachelor, Gottlieb remained employed by the NBA until his death in December 1979, traveling from Philadelphia to New York a few times a week as a coordinator and consultant. "Eddie Gottlieb was one of the real pioneers of professional round ball", Red Smith wrote in The New York Times. Wrote Lupica, "Eddie Gottlieb loved basketball. Maybe no one ever loved basketball quite the way he did."

His story is featured in The First Basket, a documentary on the history of Jews and Basketball.

== Halls of fame ==
In 1972, Gottlieb was inducted into the Naismith Basketball Hall of Fame as a contributor. In 1980, he was inducted into the International Jewish Sports Hall of Fame. In 1997, he was inducted into the Philadelphia Jewish Sports Hall of Fame

== Head coaching record ==
Legend
Regular season	G	Games coached	W	Games won	L	Games lost	W–L %	Win–loss %
Playoffs	PG	Playoff games	PW	Playoff wins	PL	Playoff losses	PW–L %	Playoff win–loss %

Team	Year	G	W	L	W–L%	Finish	PG	PW	PL	PW–L%	Result
Philadelphia	1946–47	60	35	25	.583	2nd in Eastern	10	8	2	.800	Won BAA Championship
Philadelphia	1947–48	48	27	21	.563	1st in Eastern	13	6	7	.462	Lost BAA Championship
Philadelphia	1948–49	60	28	32	.467	4th in Eastern	2	0	2	.000	Lost in Division semifinals
Philadelphia	1949–50	68	26	42	.382	4th in Eastern	2	0	2	.000	Lost in Division semifinals
Philadelphia	1950–51	66	40	26	.606	1st in Eastern	2	0	2	.000	Lost in Division semifinals
Philadelphia	1951–52	66	33	33	.500	4th in Eastern	3	1	2	.333	Lost in Division semifinals
Philadelphia	1952–53	69	12	57	.174	5th in Eastern	—	—	—	—	Missed playoffs
Philadelphia	1953–54	72	29	43	.403	4th in Eastern	—	—	—	—	Missed playoffs
Philadelphia	1954–55	72	33	39	.458	4th in Eastern	—	—	—	—	Missed playoffs
Career		581	263	318	.453		32	15	17	.469	

Sporting positions
New creation	Philadelphia Warriors principal owner 1946–1962	Succeeded by Franklin Mieuli as San Francisco Warriors
