= Roy Pugh =

American basketball player (1922–2006)

Personal information
- Born: October 16, 1922 Jacksonville, Texas, U.S.
- Died: August 3, 2006 (aged 83) Jacksonville, Texas, U.S.
- Listed height: 6 ft 6 in (1.98 m)
- Listed weight: 210 lb (95 kg)

Career information
- High school: Athens (Athens, Texas)
- College: SMU (1942–1943, 1946–1948)
- BAA draft: 1948: -- round, --
- Drafted by: Philadelphia Warriors
- Playing career: 1948–1949
- Position: Center / power forward
- Number: 16

Career history
- 1948: Indianapolis Kautskys
- 1948: Indianapolis Jets
- 1948: Fort Wayne Pistons
- 1948–1949: Philadelphia Warriors

Career BAA statistics
- Points: 32 (1.4 ppg)
- Assists: 9 (0.4 apg)
- Stats at NBA.com
- Stats at Basketball Reference

Roy Travis Pugh (October 19, 1922 – August 3, 2006) was an American professional basketball player. Pugh was selected in the 1948 BAA Draft by the Philadelphia Warriors. In 1948–49, he played in the National Basketball League for the Indianapolis Kautskys before moving to the Basketball Association of America. In just one season in the BAA, Pugh played for the Indianapolis Jets, Fort Wayne Pistons, and Philadelphia Warriors. Pugh played college basketball for the SMU Mustangs.

== BAA career statistics ==
Legend
GP	Games played	FG%	Field-goal percentage
FT%	Free-throw percentage	APG	Assists per game
PPG	Points per game	**Bold**	Career high

=== Regular season ===
Year	Team	GP	FG%	FT%	APG	PPG
1948–49	Indianapolis	6	.143	.200	.3	.5
1948–49	Fort Wayne	4	**.500**	.250	.3	**2.3**
1948–49	Philadelphia	**13**	.222	**.400**	**.5**	1.5
Career		23	.255	.316	.4	1.4
