= Jerry Rullo =

American basketball player (1923–2016)

Personal information
- Born: June 23, 1923 Philadelphia, Pennsylvania, U.S.
- Died: October 21, 2016 (aged 93) Philadelphia, Pennsylvania, U.S.
- Listed height: 5 ft 10 in (1.78 m)
- Listed weight: 165 lb (75 kg)

Career information
- High school: John Bartram (Philadelphia, Pennsylvania)
- College: Temple (1942–1946)
- Playing career: 1946–1957
- Position: Guard
- Number: 7, 6

Career history
- 1946–1947: Philadelphia Warriors
- 1947: Baltimore Bullets
- 1947–1948: Philadelphia Sphas
- 1948–1949: Philadelphia Warriors
- 1949–1950: Trenton Tigers
- 1950–1957: Sunbury Mercuries

Career highlights
- BAA champion (1947); EPBL champion (1951); EPBL Most Valuable Player (1951); 2× All-EPBL First Team (1951, 1953); 2× All-EPBL Second Team (1952, 1954)
- Stats at NBA.com
- Stats at Basketball Reference

Generoso Charles "Jerry" Rullo (June 23, 1923 – October 21, 2016) was an American professional basketball player.

== Biography ==
He attended John Bartram High School in his hometown of Philadelphia, Pennsylvania. A 5 ft 10 in (1.78 m) guard from Temple University, Rullo played four seasons (1946–1950) in the Basketball Association of America/National Basketball Association as a member of the Philadelphia Warriors and Baltimore Bullets. He averaged 2.9 points per game in his BAA/NBA career and won a league championship with Philadelphia in 1947. Rullo played for eight seasons in the Eastern Professional Basketball League (EPBL) for the Sunbury Mercuries. He was selected as the EPBL Most Valuable Player in 1951 and was a four-time All-EPBL team selection. He won an EPBL championship with the Mercuries in 1951.

With the deaths of Ralph Kaplowitz and Angelo Musi in 2009, Rullo was the last living member of that Warriors championship team, the first in the history of the BAA/NBA. With the death of Kenny Sailors in January 2016, Rullo became the last living player from the inaugural 1946–47 season of the BAA. He died on October 21, 2016, of heart failure at Penn Medicine Rittenhouse.

== BAA/NBA career statistics ==
Legend
| GP | Games played | GS | Games started | MPG | Minutes per game |
| FG% | Field goal percentage | 3P% | 3-point field goal percentage | FT% | Free throw percentage |
| RPG | Rebounds per game | APG | Assists per game | SPG | Steals per game |
| BPG | Blocks per game | PPG | Points per game | **Bold** | Career high |
| † | Won an NBA championship |

| Year | Team | GP | FG% | FT% | APG | PPG |
|---|---|---|---|---|---|---|
| 1946–47† | Philadelphia | **50** | .299 | .489 | .4 | 2.5 |
| 1947–48 | Baltimore | 2 | .000 | .000 | .0 | .0 |
| 1948–49 | Philadelphia | 39 | .290 | .689 | **1.2** | **3.5** |
| 1949–50 | Philadelphia | 4 | **.333** | **1.000** | .5 | 1.8 |
| Career | | 95 | .292 | .591 | .7 | 2.9 |

=== Playoffs ===
| Year | Team | GP | FG% | FT% | APG | PPG |
|---|---|---|---|---|---|---|
| 1947† | Philadelphia | **7** | .231 | **1.000** | .0 | 1.0 |
| 1949 | Philadelphia | 2 | **.250** | **1.000** | **.5** | **3.0** |
| Career | | 9 | .238 | 1.000 | .1 | 1.4 |
