= Petey Rosenberg =

American basketball player (1918–1997)

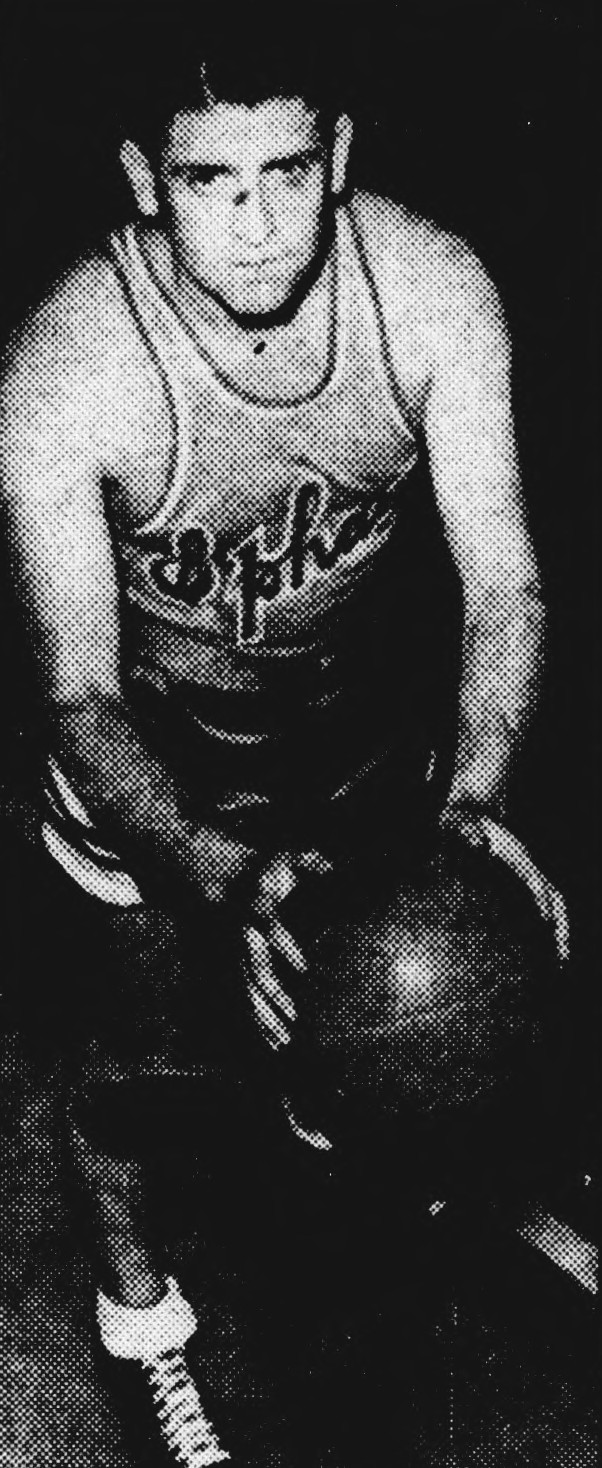
- Rosenberg, circa 1940

Personal information
- Born: April 7, 1918 Philadelphia, Pennsylvania, U.S.
- Died: June 29, 1997 (aged 79) Claymont, Delaware, U.S.
- Listed height: 5 ft 10 in (1.78 m)
- Listed weight: 165 lb (75 kg)

Career information
- High school: South Philadelphia (Philadelphia, Pennsylvania); Brown Prep (Philadelphia, Pennsylvania)
- College: Saint Joseph's (1937–1938)
- Playing career: 1938–1948
- Position: Guard
- Number: 15

Career history
- 1938–1942: Philadelphia Sphas
- 1942: New York Jewels
- 1942–1946: Philadelphia Sphas
- 1946–1947: Philadelphia Warriors
- 1947–1948: Pottsville Packers

Career highlights
- BAA champion (1947)
- Stats at NBA.com
- Stats at Basketball Reference

Alexander "Petey" Rosenberg (April 7, 1918–June 29, 1997) was an American professional basketball player.

A 5'10" guard from Saint Joseph's University, Rosenberg played one season in the Basketball Association of America as a member of the Philadelphia Warriors. He averaged 2.9 points per game and won a league championship.

== BAA career statistics ==
Legend
GP	Games played	GS	Games started	MPG	Minutes per game
FG%	Field goal percentage	3P%	3-point field goal percentage	FT%	Free throw percentage
RPG	Rebounds per game	APG	Assists per game	SPG	Steals per game
BPG	Blocks per game	PPG	Points per game	**Bold**	Career high
†	Won an NBA championship

=== Regular season ===
Year	Team	GP	FG%	FT%	APG	PPG
1946–47†	Philadelphia	51	.209	.612	.5	2.9
Career		51	.209	.612	.5	2.9

=== Playoffs ===
Year	Team	GP	FG%	FT%	APG	PPG
1946–47†	Philadelphia	9	.083	.000	.3	.2
Career		9	.083	.000	.3	.2
