= Jerry Fleishman =

American basketball player

Personal information
- Born: February 14, 1922 Brooklyn, New York, U.S.
- Died: June 20, 2007 (aged 85) Boca Raton, Florida, U.S.
- Listed height: 6 ft 2 in (1.88 m)
- Listed weight: 190 lb (86 kg)

Career information
- High school: Erasmus Hall (Brooklyn, New York)
- College: NYU (1942–1943)
- Playing career: 1944–1953
- Position: Shooting guard
- Number: 6, 9, 4

Career history
- 1944–1946: Philadelphia Sphas
- 1946–1950: Philadelphia Warriors
- 1950–1951: Scranton Miners
- 1951–1952: Saratoga Harlem Yankees
- 1952: Scranton Miners
- 1952–1953: Philadelphia Warriors
- 1953: New York Knicks

Career highlights
- BAA champion (1947); Second-team All-American – Pic (1943)
- Stats at NBA.com
- Stats at Basketball Reference

Jerome Martin Fleishman (February 14, 1922 – June 20, 2007) was an American professional basketball player.

A 6'2" shooting guard from New York University, Fleishman played five seasons (1946–1950; 1952–1953) in the Basketball Association of America/National Basketball Association as a member of the Philadelphia Warriors and New York Knicks. He averaged 5.8 points per game in his BAA/NBA career and won a league championship in 1947.

== BAA/NBA career statistics ==
Legend
GP	Games played	GS	Games started	MPG	Minutes per game
FG%	Field goal percentage	3P%	3-point field goal percentage	FT%	Free throw percentage
RPG	Rebounds per game	APG	Assists per game	SPG	Steals per game
BPG	Blocks per game	PPG	Points per game	**Bold**	Career high
†	Won an NBA championship

=== Regular season ===
Year	Team	GP	MPG	FG%	FT%	RPG	APG	PPG
1946–47†	Philadelphia	59	–	.261	.543	–	.7	4.5
1947–48	Philadelphia	46	–	.238	**.688**	–	.9	7.2
1948–49	Philadelphia	59	–	.290	.653	–	2.0	5.5
1949–50	Philadelphia	**65**	–	.289	.616	–	1.8	4.6
1952–53	Philadelphia	33	**26.7**	**.330**	.686	**4.6**	**3.3**	**9.0**
Career		262	26.7	.277	.638	4.6	1.6	5.8

=== Playoffs ===
Year	Team	GP	MPG	FG%	FT%	RPG	APG	PPG
1947†	Philadelphia	**9**	–	.314	.722	–	.3	6.3
1948	Philadelphia	7	–	.172	**.750**	–	.3	2.3
1949	Philadelphia	2	–	.269	.667	–	2.0	**10.0**
1950	Philadelphia	2	–	.333	.000	–	1.5	1.0
1953	New York	2	**13.0**	.667	.462	**2.5**	**3.5**	5.0
Career		22	13.0	.282	.633	2.5	.9	4.8
