= Lists of NBA players =

This article comprises lists of National Basketball Association (NBA) players.

These lists include players from the American National Basketball League (NBL), the Basketball Association of America (BAA), and the original American Basketball Association (ABA). All of these leagues contributed to the formation of the present-day NBA.

== See also ==
- List of current NBA team rosters
- List of foreign NBA players
- List of National Basketball Association undrafted players
- List of NBA players who have spent their entire career with one franchise
- Naismith Memorial Basketball Hall of Fame
- 50 Greatest Players in NBA History
- NBA 75th Anniversary Team
