= Angelo Musi =

American basketball player

Personal information
- Born: July 25, 1918 Philadelphia, Pennsylvania, U.S.
- Died: October 19, 2009 (aged 91) Bryn Mawr, Pennsylvania, U.S.
- Listed height: 5 ft 9 in (1.75 m)
- Listed weight: 145 lb (66 kg)

Career information
- High school: Overbrook (Philadelphia, Pennsylvania)
- College: Temple (1940–1943)
- Playing career: 1943–1950
- Position: Point guard
- Number: 5

Career history
- 1943–1945: Wilmington Bombers
- 1946–1949: Philadelphia Warriors
- 1949–1950: Trenton Tigers

Career highlights
- BAA champion (1947)
- Stats at NBA.com
- Stats at Basketball Reference

Angelo Musi Jr. (July 25, 1918 – October 19, 2009) was an American professional basketball player.

A 5'9" guard from Temple University, Musi played three seasons (1946–1949) in the Basketball Association of America as a member of the Philadelphia Warriors. He averaged 8.4 points per game in his BAA career and won a league championship in 1947.

Musi died on October 19, 2009, at his home in Philadelphia. He was 91 years old.

== BAA career statistics ==
Legend
GP	Games played	GS	Games started	MPG	Minutes per game
FG%	Field goal percentage	3P%	3-point field goal percentage	FT%	Free throw percentage
RPG	Rebounds per game	APG	Assists per game	SPG	Steals per game
BPG	Blocks per game	PPG	Points per game	**Bold**	Career high
†	Won an NBA championship

=== Regular season ===
Year	Team	GP	FG%	FT%	APG	PPG
1946–47†	Philadelphia	**60**	.281	**.829**	.4	**9.4**
1947–48	Philadelphia	43	.276	.699	.2	7.4
1948–49	Philadelphia	58	**.314**	.756	**1.4**	8.2
Career		161	.290	.771	.7	8.4

=== Playoffs ===
Year	Team	GP	FG%	FT%	APG	PPG
1947†	Philadelphia	10	**.300**	.724	.5	**11.7**
1948	Philadelphia	**13**	.202	.750	**.8**	5.6
1949	Philadelphia	2	.176	**1.000**	.0	4.0
Career		25	.252	.746	.6	7.9

== See also ==
- List of shortest players in National Basketball Association history
