= 1946–47 Philadelphia Warriors season =

BAA professional basketball team season (1st team season)

- BAA champions
- Head coach: Eddie Gottlieb
- General manager: Eddie Gottlieb
- Owner(s): Pete Tyrell; Eddie Gottlieb
- Arena: Philadelphia Arena

Results
- Record: 35–25 (.583)
- Place: Division: 2nd (Eastern)
- Playoff finish: BAA Champions Defeated Stags 4–1
- Stats at Basketball Reference
- Radio: WCAU

The 1946–47 Philadelphia Warriors season was the first season of the Philadelphia Warriors in the BAA (which later became the NBA). During the inaugural season's process within the BAA, team owner and head coach Eddie Gottlieb (who had been the only original BAA owner/associate of the era to have any prior experience with the sport of basketball at the time) would at one point in time think about having the players from his original Philadelphia Sphas roster within the rivaling American Basketball League actually join his new team in the BAA (which would have, by extension, made their franchise history result in them being the longest-standing professional basketball franchise in the present day, ahead of both the present-day Sacramento Kings and Detroit Pistons), but Gottlieb ultimately decided against that option (though he would decide to name this franchise in honor of his original Sphas franchise due to them previously going under the Philadelphia Warriors in the original ABL from 1926 until 1928). For the Warriors' first game ever played on November 7, 1946, a notable event would occur late in that game where after five of the Pittsburgh Ironmen's players (which involved their leading scorer Moe Becker alongside John Abramovic, Press Maravich, Ed Melvin, and John Mills, with Mike Bytzura being dangerously close to joining them himself also) fouled out of the game (back when fouling out involved five fouls instead of the six fouls the league implements to this day going forward) and opposing head coach Paul Birch refused the Warriors' offer to reinstate one of their disqualified players back into the game, the two teams decided to finish the game off with their teams playing the rest of the game in a four-on-four manner as opposed to the usual five-on-five display, which led to the Warriors winning 81–75. Despite later finishing the season in second place within the Eastern Division behind only the Washington Capitols (who had the best record in league history throughout the BAA/NBA's first 20 years of history and the fewest number of losses recorded in a season there until 1996), the Warriors ended up finishing the season winning their first league championship by winning the inaugural 1947 BAA Finals (now known as the NBA Finals) 4–1 over the Chicago Stags (who continued existing as a franchise until 1950). Greater details on their first season would be explored in Charley Rosen's book called "The First Tip-Off: The Incredible Story of the Birth of the NBA", with an entire chapter dedicated to the Warriors' first season in the BAA/NBA alongside the various highs and lows (mostly highs from this specific season) that would eventually lead to them becoming the franchise that they are today.

== Roster ==
Due to this being the first season in the franchise's history, the BAA didn't utilize a draft system like they would in future seasons of the BAA/NBA and instead relied upon some combination of the head coach and the general manager of the team finding and signing players in time to start out their training camp period for the season. At one point in time, head coach Eddie Gottlieb thought about simply transferring his original roster from the Philadelphia Sphas (his original team from the older American Basketball League) into the BAA, which would have made this team's roster building process become a lot easier on their ends (although a few of the Sphas' players would end up joining the BAA's roster instead of staying with the Sphas for this season). However, for the Warriors, head coach Gottlieb had three background experiences in common with most of the players he would sign up for their opening night roster: several players were local to the Philadelphia area and had graduated from either Temple University or Saint Joseph's College, virtually all of the players had previously played basketball while serving in the U.S. military, and a majority of his players were veterans from the older American Basketball League that helped inspire the Philadelphia Warriors team name that was being used in the BAA for this season. As such, Philadelphia's opening night roster included the likes of former Wilmington Bombers and 41st Division Juglers guard Angelo Musi from Temple University, former Philadelphia Sphas center Art Hillhouse from Long Island University, former Wilkes-Barre Barons and Trenton Tigers (and U.S. Army) forward Matt Guokas from Saint Joseph's College, former Philadelphia Sphas and New York Jewels (and Camp Luna) guard Petey Rosenberg from Saint Joseph's College, former Philadelphia Sphas and Fort Jackson guard Jerry Fleishman from New York University, former Philadelphia Sphas (and U.S. Army) guard George Senesky from Saint Joseph's College, Jerry Rullo from Temple University, Fred Sheffield from the 1944 NCAA champion University of Utah team, and former U.S. Marine Corps star forward Joe Fulks from Murray State Teachers College. While the team was never considered the most talented squad in the BAA's inaugural season, what made them work was that they were a tough squad that pulled through for each other, though their offense would be centered exclusively around getting the ball to their star player, Joe Fulks, during this season.

1946–47 Philadelphia Warriors roster
Players

Pos.	No.	Player	Height	Weight	DOB	From
F	12	Howie Dallmar	6 ft 4 in (1.93 m)	200 lb (91 kg)	1922-05-24	Stanford
G	6	Jerry Fleishman	6 ft 2 in (1.88 m)	190 lb (86 kg)	1922-02-14	NYU
F	10	Joe Fulks	6 ft 5 in (1.96 m)	190 lb (86 kg)	1921-10-26	Murray State
F	14	Matt Guokas	6 ft 3 in (1.91 m)	195 lb (88 kg)	1915-11-11	Saint Joseph's
C	18	Art Hillhouse	6 ft 7 in (2.01 m)	220 lb (100 kg)	1916-06-12	Long Island
G/F	9	Ralph Kaplowitz	6 ft 2 in (1.88 m)	170 lb (77 kg)	1919-05-18	NYU
G	5	Angelo Musi	5 ft 9 in (1.75 m)	145 lb (66 kg)	1918-07-25	Temple
G	15	Petey Rosenberg	5 ft 10 in (1.78 m)	165 lb (75 kg)	1918-04-07	Saint Joseph's
G	7	Jerry Rullo	5 ft 10 in (1.78 m)	165 lb (75 kg)	1923-06-23	Temple
G	8	George Senesky	6 ft 2 in (1.88 m)	179 lb (81 kg)	1922-04-04	Saint Joseph's

Coaches
Head coach
- Eddie Gottlieb

Legend
- (DP) Unsigned draft pick
- (FA) Free agent
- (S) Suspended
- Injured

Roster

== Regular season ==
=== Season standings ===
#	Eastern Division				
#	Team	W	L	PCT	GB
1	x-Washington Capitols	49	11	.817	–
2	x-Philadelphia Warriors	35	25	.583	14
3	x-New York Knicks	33	27	.550	16
4	Providence Steamrollers	28	32	.467	21
5	Boston Celtics	22	38	.367	27
6	Toronto Huskies	22	38	.367	27

=== Game log ===
#	Date	Opponent	Score	High points	Record
1	November 7	Pittsburgh	W 81–75	Joe Fulks (25)	1–0
2	November 14	Washington	W 68–65	Joe Fulks (19)	2–0
3	November 19	St. Louis	L 63–66	Joe Fulks (24)	2–1
4	November 21	Chicago	L 63–65	Fred Sheffield (14)	2–2
5	November 26	Boston	W 66–54	Angelo Musi (16)	3–2
6	November 28	Detroit	L 55–68	Fulks, Rosenberg (14)	3–3
7	November 30	@ New York	L 60–64 (OT)	Joe Fulks (26)	3–4
8	December 3	Providence	W 76–68	Joe Fulks (37)	4–4
9	December 5	New York	W 62–51	Angelo Musi (20)	5–4
10	December 7	@ St. Louis	W 57–47	Joe Fulks (18)	6–4
11	December 8	@ Cleveland	L 66–72	Joe Fulks (25)	6–5
12	December 10	@ Toronto	W 85–73	Joe Fulks (29)	7–5
13	December 12	Washington	L 49–64	Joe Fulks (17)	7–6
14	December 14	@ Boston	L 65–77	Joe Fulks (28)	7–7
15	December 17	Detroit	W 57–49	Angelo Musi (14)	8–7
16	December 19	Cleveland	W 58–44	Joe Fulks (26)	9–7
17	December 21	@ Washington	L 56–68	Joe Fulks (29)	9–8
18	December 26	Pittsburgh	W 53–46	Joe Fulks (22)	10–8
19	December 27	@ Boston	W 63–60	Joe Fulks (25)	11–8
20	December 29	@ St. Louis	L 68–75	Joe Fulks (29)	11–9
21	December 30	@ Pittsburgh	W 62–60	Joe Fulks (19)	12–9
22	January 2	Providence	W 84–72	Joe Fulks (35)	13–9
23	January 4	@ Providence	L 74–78	Joe Fulks (31)	13–10
24	January 8	@ Pittsburgh	L 63–67	Joe Fulks (19)	13–11
25	January 9	Toronto	W 74–55	Joe Fulks (35)	14–11
26	January 11	@ Detroit	L 56–58	Joe Fulks (20)	14–12
27	January 12	@ Chicago	L 72–75	Joe Fulks (32)	14–13
28	January 14	@ Toronto	W 104–74	Joe Fulks (41)	15–13
29	January 16	Chicago	L 78–84	Joe Fulks (36)	15–14
30	January 21	Boston	W 59–43	Joe Fulks (22)	16–14
31	January 22	@ Washington	L 55–57	Joe Fulks (20)	16–15
32	January 23	Cleveland	W 83–78	Joe Fulks (28)	17–15
33	January 25	@ Detroit	W 61–55	Joe Fulks (23)	18–15
34	January 26	@ Chicago	L 57–63	Joe Fulks (19)	18–16
35	January 30	New York	W 65–58	Joe Fulks (18)	19–16
36	February 1	@ New York	W 71–63	Joe Fulks (31)	20–16
37	February 3	@ Boston	W 61–55	Howie Dallmar (22)	21–16
38	February 4	Providence	W 75–68	Joe Fulks (19)	22–16
39	February 6	Toronto	W 79–61	Joe Fulks (37)	23–16
40	February 8	@ Providence	L 58–67	Howie Dallmar (19)	23–17
41	February 11	St. Louis	W 75–59	Joe Fulks (25)	24–17
42	February 13	Cleveland	W 61–48	Joe Fulks (19)	25–17
43	February 15	@ Washington	L 60–70	Joe Fulks (18)	25–18
44	February 16	@ Cleveland	L 71–75	Joe Fulks (23)	25–19
45	February 20	Pittsburgh	W 78–66	Joe Fulks (34)	26–19
46	February 23	@ St. Louis	L 66–71	Angelo Musi (22)	26–20
47	February 24	@ Pittsburgh	W 69–67	Joe Fulks (22)	27–20
48	February 26	St. Louis	W 75–65	Joe Fulks (25)	28–20
49	February 28	@ Toronto	L 69–77	Joe Fulks (23)	28–21
50	March 2	@ Cleveland	L 69–72	Joe Fulks (21)	28–22
51	March 3	Toronto	W 76–66	Joe Fulks (25)	29–22
52	March 6	New York	L 59–61	Joe Fulks (20)	29–23
53	March 11	Washington	L 77–80	Art Hillhouse (20)	29–24
54	March 13	Boston	W 81–57	Joe Fulks (25)	30–24
55	March 14	@ Chicago	L 67–70	Dallmar, Fulks (18)	30–25
56	March 16	@ Detroit	W 67–61	Joe Fulks (16)	31–25
57	March 20	Detroit	W 77–75	Joe Fulks (15)	32–25
58	March 22	@ Providence	W 103–82	Joe Fulks (24)	33–25
59	March 27	Chicago	W 80–73	Joe Fulks (34)	34–25
60	March 30	@ New York	W 76–72	Art Hillhouse (18)	35–25

== Playoffs ==
1947 playoff game log
BAA Quarterfinals: 2–1 (home: 1–0; road: 1–1)

Game	Date	Team	Score	High points	Location Attendance	Series
1	Wednesday, April 2	St. Louis	W 73–68	Angelo Musi (19)	Philadelphia Arena; 8,273	1–0
2	Saturday, April 5	@ St. Louis	L 51–73	Angelo Musi (12)	St. Louis Arena	1–1
3	Easter Sunday, April 6	@ St. Louis	W 75–59	Joe Fulks (24)	St. Louis Arena	2–1

BAA Semifinals: 2–0 (home: 1–0; road: 1–0)

Game	Date	Team	Score	High points	Location	Series
1	Saturday, April 12	New York	W 82–70	Joe Fulks (24)	Philadelphia Arena	1–0
2	Monday, April 14	@ New York	W 72–53	Joe Fulks (16)	Madison Square Garden III	2–0

BAA Finals: 4–1 (home: 3–0; road: 1–1)

Game	Date	Team	Score	High points	High assists	Location Attendance	Series
1	Wednesday, April 16	Chicago	W 84–71	Joe Fulks (37)	Howie Dallmar (4)	Philadelphia Arena; 7,918	1–0
2	Thursday, April 17	Chicago	W 85–74	Howie Dallmar (18)	Ralph Kaplowitz (2)	Philadelphia Arena; 7,604	2–0
3	Saturday, April 19	@ Chicago	W 75–72	Joe Fulks (26)	—	Chicago Stadium; 2,209	3–0
4	Sunday, April 20	@ Chicago	L 73–74	George Senesky (24)	Jerry Fleishman (4)	Chicago Stadium; 1,934	3–1
5	Tuesday, April 22	Chicago	W 83–80	Joe Fulks (34)	Howie Dallmar (4)	Philadelphia Arena; 8,221	4–1

1947 schedule

Interestingly, despite the Stags looking like they should have home court advantage this series due to them having the better record than the Warriors for the inaugural 1947 BAA Finals, it would be the Warriors that would be given the home court advantage for the championship series instead due to the Chicago Stadium hosting a circus at the time, with later scheduling issues causing the Stags to lose out on the rest of their potential home games they might have had after Game 4 was played (which turned out to only be one extra game in the inaugural BAA Finals series to avoid Philadelphia sweeping Chicago entirely). Following the event's conclusion, Warriors players were rewarded $2,000 in prize money, which would almost be a half-season's salary in pay for some of their players.

== Player statistics ==
Legend
GP	Games played	GS	Games started	MPG	Minutes per game
FG%	Field-goal percentage	3P%	3-point field-goal percentage	FT%	Free-throw percentage
RPG	Rebounds per game	APG	Assists per game	SPG	Steals per game
BPG	Blocks per game	PPG	Points per game

=== Regular season ===
Bold – Leaders (qualified)

Philadelphia Warriors statistics
Player	GP	GS	MPG	FG%	3P%	FT%	RPG	APG	SPG	BPG	PPG
Howie Dallmar	**60**	–	–	.280	–	.640	–	**1.7**	–	–	8.8
Jerry Fleishman	59	–	–	.261	–	.543	–	.7	–	–	4.5
Joe Fulks	**60**	–	–	**.305**	–	.730	–	.4	–	–	**23.2**
Matt Guokas	47	–	–	.269	–	.553	–	.2	–	–	1.7
Art Hillhouse	**60**	–	–	.291	–	.723	–	.7	–	–	6.0
Ralph Kaplowitz	30	–	–	.291	–	.738	–	.4	–	–	7.0
John Murphy	11	–	–	.200	–	.667	–	.0	–	–	.7
Angelo Musi	**60**	–	–	.281	–	**.829**	–	.4	–	–	9.4
Petey Rosenberg	51	–	–	.209	–	.612	–	.5	–	–	2.9
Jerry Rullo	50	–	–	.299	–	.489	–	.4	–	–	2.5
George Senesky	58	–	–	.267	–	.661	–	.6	–	–	6.3
Fred Sheffield	22	–	–	.199	–	.615	–	.2	–	–	3.4

=== Playoffs ===
Philadelphia Warriors statistics
Player	GP	GS	MPG	FG%	3P%	FT%	RPG	APG	SPG	BPG	PPG
Howie Dallmar	**10**	–	–	.250	–	.750	–	**1.6**	–	–	8.2
Jerry Fleishman	9	–	–	.314	–	.722	–	.3	–	–	6.3
Joe Fulks	**10**	–	–	.288	–	.787	–	.3	–	–	**22.2**
Matt Guokas	8	–	–	.111	–	.400	–	.0	–	–	0.5
Art Hillhouse	**10**	–	–	.264	–	.848	–	.8	–	–	8.7
Ralph Kaplowitz	**10**	–	–	.224	–	.815	–	.6	–	–	6.6
Angelo Musi	**10**	–	–	.300	–	.724	–	.5	–	–	11.7
Petey Rosenberg	9	–	–	.083	–	.000	–	.3	–	–	0.2
Jerry Rullo	7	–	–	.231	–	**1.000**	–	.0	–	–	1.0
George Senesky	**10**	–	–	**.317**	–	.808	–	.8	–	–	10.9

== Transactions ==
=== Purchases ===
Player	Date bought	Previous team
Ralph Kaplowitz	January 16, 1947	New York Knicks

== Awards and records ==
- Joe Fulks, NBA Scoring Champion
- Joe Fulks, All-NBA First Team

== Season losses ==
Throughout this season, the Philadelphia Warriors only had an average total of 4,300 paid attendees per game (which would become the highest number of paid attendees in the BAA this season). Despite having a high number of paid attendees coming to their games this season, the Warriors' net receipts only totaled up to $191,117 for the season, with their estimated losses only totaling up to around $30,000 for this season despite being crowned the inaugural BAA(/NBA) Finals champions. In spite of them seeing any losses at all during that period of time, the Philadelphia Warriors would be one of six teams to fully confirm their interest in staying on board for another season while playing in the BAA due to a combination of them gaining a high number of fans being interested in watching their games while paying for them to go watch their games and having a very successful, championship winning team this season (alongside the rivaling American Basketball League entering its steep decline during this season, which ultimately hurt the nearby Philadelphia Sphas a lot more by comparison). While the Philadelphia franchise would end up moving to San Francisco, California in 1962 to become the San Francisco Warriors before eventually becoming the Golden State Warriors following a future move to nearby Oakland years later, to this day, they join both the Boston Celtics and the New York Knicks as the only inaugural BAA/NBA teams to still exist in the present day.
