= Joe Fulks =

American basketball player (1921–1976)

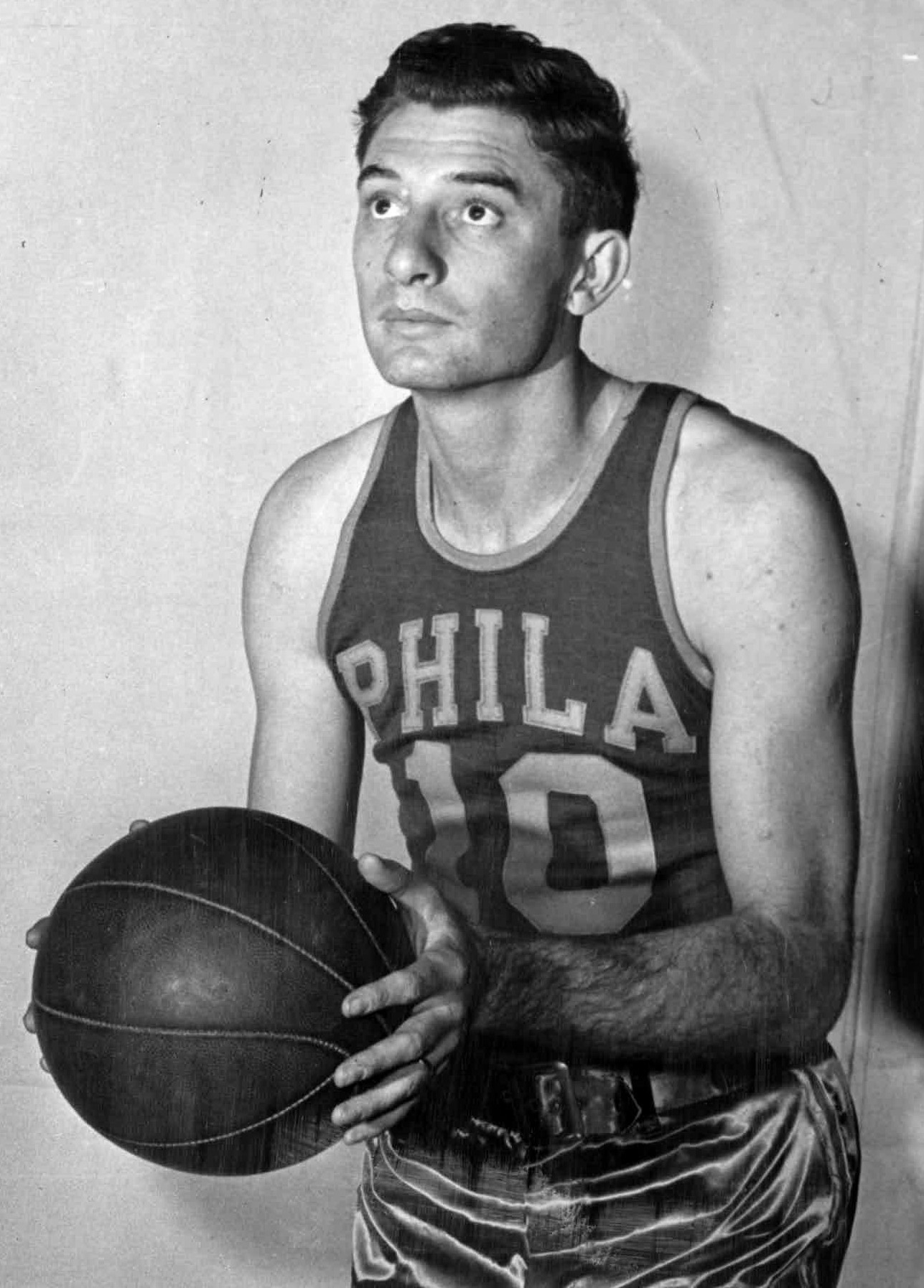
- Fulks in 1946

Personal information
- Born: October 26, 1921 Birmingham, Kentucky, U.S.
- Died: March 21, 1976 (aged 54) Eddyville, Kentucky, U.S.
- Listed height: 6 ft 5 in (1.96 m)
- Listed weight: 190 lb (86 kg)

Career information
- High school: Kuttawa (Kuttawa, Kentucky)
- College: Murray State (1941–1943)
- Playing career: 1946–1954
- Position: Power forward
- Number: 10

Career history
- 1946–1954: Philadelphia Warriors

Career highlights
- BAA champion (1947); 2× NBA All-Star (1951, 1952); 3× All-BAA First Team (1947–1949); All-NBA Second Team (1951); BAA scoring champion (1947); NBA 25th Anniversary Team; No. 26 retired by Murray State Racers

Career statistics
- Points: 8,003 (16.4 ppg)
- Rebounds: 1,379 (5.3 rpg)
- Assists: 587 (1.2 apg)
- Stats at NBA.com
- Stats at Basketball Reference
- Basketball Hall of Fame
- Collegiate Basketball Hall of Fame

Joseph Franklin "Jumping Joe" Fulks (October 26, 1921 – March 21, 1976) was an American professional basketball player. The NBA's first scoring champion, he was sometimes called "the first of the high-scoring forwards". He was posthumously enshrined in the Naismith Memorial Basketball Hall of Fame in 1978.

== Early life ==
Fulks was born on a farm outside of Birmingham, Kentucky, a small town in the state's far-western Purchase region. Due to his family's low income, Fulks did not own a real basketball in his youth, instead practicing with a tin can or a stuffed sock until a local high school coach gifted him a used ball.

Fulks began his high school career for Birmingham High School, becoming a star player for the team. Following his junior season, he moved with his family to Kuttawa, Kentucky. This move preempted the Tennessee Valley Authority's damming of the Tennessee River, which flooded Birmingham under Kentucky Lake. Kuttawa was accused of recruiting Fulks to their basketball team by securing his father a job at the local prison, but an investigation by the Kentucky High School Association Board of Control did not find enough evidence to punish the school.

== College career ==
He played college ball at Murray State University (then known as Murray State Teachers College) for two years before leaving school to join the Marines in May 1942. He served with 3rd Battalion, 9th Marines during World War II, and was discharged as a corporal in May 1946. His number 26 hangs in the rafters at Murray State's CFSB Center.

== Professional career ==
=== Philadelphia Warriors (1946–1954) ===
Fulks joined the BAA's Philadelphia Warriors in 1946, at age 25, and as a rookie won the league's first scoring title with a 23.2 points per game average as the Warriors won the BAA title. Fulks again led the league in scoring average during the 1947–48 season at 22.1 points per game, but lost the scoring title to Max Zaslofsky, who had more total points. Fulks had a career best 26.0 points per game average in the 1948–49 season. Fulks led the NBA in free throw percentage during the 1950–51 season.

Fulks set the BAA/NBA single game scoring record four different times. On December 3, 1946, in just his eighth game as a professional, Fulks became the league's record holder for most points scored in a single game when he scored 37 points, making 16 field goals and five free throws, in Philadelphia's 76–68 win over the Providence Steam Rollers. Just 20 games later on January 14, 1947, Fulks set a new single game scoring record when he scored 41 points, making 15 field goals and 11 free throws, in Philadelphia's 104–74 win over the Toronto Huskies. In the 1946–47 season, Fulks also led the league in scoring for its inaugural season, scoring 23.2 points per game. Two seasons later, on December 18, 1948, Fulks tied Carl Braun's single game scoring record when he scored 47 points, making 18 field goals and 11 free throws, in Philadelphia's 94–90 win against the Providence Steamrollers.

For the fourth and final time, Fulks set a new single-game scoring record when he scored 63 points on February 10, 1949. It remained the most in an NBA game until Elgin Baylor scored 64 points in a 1959 game. Fulks' 63-point outburst came during a Warriors 108–87 victory over the Indianapolis Jets. Fulks made 27 of 56 field goal attempts and nine of 14 free throws. Along the way he shattered the record for most points in one half (33), field goals, and field goal attempts. Two seasons after his 63-point game, on January 4, 1951, Fulks grabbed a career-high 16 rebounds, alongside scoring 20 points, in a 92–69 win over the Baltimore Bullets.

The 6-foot-5-inch (1.96 m) Fulks was known both for his athletic drives to the basket as well as his shooting. He was perhaps most remembered as one of the pioneers of the modern jump shot. During his early career, Fulks was considered the league's greatest offensive player. In his first three seasons, Fulks averaged 23.9 points per game at a time when, before the advent of the shot-clock, teams rarely scored over 70 points in a game. Fulks was named to the All-BAA First Team during his first three seasons. In 1971, he was one of 10 players named to the NBA 25th Anniversary Team. However, indicative of his era, Fulks was a low-efficiency shooter, holding the 29th-worst career field goal percentage in NBA history for players who attempted at least 1,000 shots, making only 30.2% of the shots he attempted.

Fulks attempted 50 shots in game three times, which included going 13-for-55 (.236) for a total of 42 missed shots against the Providence Steam Rollers on March 18, 1948; it is still the only time a player has shot over 50 times and made less than 30 percent of their shots for a game in NBA history. In the playoffs on March 30, 1948, against the St. Louis Bombers, he went 8-of-46 for a total of 38 missed shots and a 17.4 percent shooting percentage; the 46 field goal attempts were a league record for a playoff game until 1962 and no player has missed as many shots in a playoff game since Fulks.

== Later life and death ==
Upon his retirement, Fulks returned to Marshall County, Kentucky, where he lived the remainder of his life. He worked at the GAF plant in Calvert City, Kentucky for nearly 20 years after his career was over. In 1975, he started working at the Kentucky State Penitentiary as the prison recreation director. Fulks was shot and killed on March 21, 1976, by Greg Bannister, the son of his girlfriend, Roberta Bannister, during an argument over a handgun. A jury found Bannister guilty of reckless homicide and he was sentenced to four and a half years in prison. Fulks was buried in Briensburg, Kentucky.

== BAA/NBA career statistics ==
Legend
GP	Games played	GS	Games started	MPG	Minutes per game
FG%	Field goal percentage	3P%	3-point field goal percentage	FT%	Free throw percentage
RPG	Rebounds per game	APG	Assists per game	SPG	Steals per game
BPG	Blocks per game	PPG	Points per game	**Bold**	Career high
†	Won an NBA championship	*	Led the league

=== Regular season ===
Year	Team	GP	MPG	FG%	FT%	RPG	APG	PPG
1946–47†	Philadelphia	60	–	.305	.730	–	.4	23.2*
1947–48	Philadelphia	43	–	.259	.762	–	.6	22.1*
1948–49	Philadelphia	60	–	.313	.787	–	1.2	**26.0**
1949–50	Philadelphia	68	–	.278	.696	–	.8	14.2
1950–51	Philadelphia	66	–	.316	**.855***	**7.9**	1.8	18.7
1951–52	Philadelphia	61	**31.2**	.312	.825	6.0	**2.0**	15.1
1952–53	Philadelphia	**70**	29.8	**.346**	.727	5.5	**2.0**	11.9
1953–54	Philadelphia	61	8.2	.266	.571	1.7	.5	2.5
Career		489	23.4	.302	.766	5.3	1.2	16.4
All-Star		2	9.0	.409	.700	6.0	2.5	12.5

=== Playoffs ===
Year	Team	GP	MPG	FG%	FT%	RPG	APG	PPG
1947†	Philadelphia	10	–	.288	.787	–	.3	22.2
1948	Philadelphia	**13**	–	.242	**.810**	–	.2	21.7
1949	Philadelphia	1	–	.000	.000	–	.0	.0
1950	Philadelphia	2	–	.192	.500	–	**1.0**	7.5
1951	Philadelphia	2	–	**.327**	.741	**8.0**	.5	**26.0**
1952	Philadelphia	3	**23.3**	.152	.778	4.0	.7	5.7
Career		31	23.3	.258	.782	5.6	.4	19.0

== See also ==
- List of National Basketball Association players with most points in a game
- List of National Basketball Association annual scoring leaders
