= 1949–50 Paterson Crescents season =

American Basketball League season

- League: American Basketball League (revived original)
- Head coach: Frank Mangiapane (6–11); Herbie Gershon (11–7)
- General manager: Mike Conte(?)
- Owner(s): Mike Conte
- Arena: Paterson Armory

Results
- Record: 17–18 (.486)
- Place: Conference: 5th
- Playoff finish: Did not qualify

The 1949–50 Paterson Crescents season was either the eighteenth professional basketball season ever played by the Paterson Crescents (and potentially their seventeenth proper season under that name with some outlets claiming they played their first season as the Paterson Whirlwinds (and the Princeton Tigers) instead, though it's also likely that their last season they played in the Interstate Basketball League had the team competing as the Paterson Silk Sox due to their connection with the baseball team of the same name at the time, with their first season back in the (revived) ABL also having the team competing as the Washington Capitols in 1944 before becoming the Paterson Crescents again in 1945) or the sixth season of play for the revived franchise, depending upon the team's actual context at hand, within the revived original version of the American Basketball League. Regardless of the proper context for them, Paterson would be one of eight teams competing in the weakened up version of the ABL to compete for the league's championship under its 23rd overall season of play, though unlike the previous two seasons, this season would end with only six teams remaining in the league by the end of the season. Similar to their previous season of play, this season would see the Crescents perform rather inconsistently throughout the season, as player-coach Frank Mangiapane would end up underperforming as a head coach this time around to get a 6–11 for this season before being replaced by Herbie Gershon for the rest of their existence going forward. Under Gershon's coaching, Paterson would get a much better 11–7 record for the second half of the season, though it would still result in the Crescents finishing the season with a below-average 17–18 record for a fifth-place finish to place ahead of the quickly defunct Schenectady Packers, the surprisingly defunct long-running team that was the Trenton Tigers turned Cohoes Marras, and the Hartford Hurricanes (who would later go defunct by the end of the season themselves). This resulted in Paterson failing to qualify for the ABL Playoffs this time around due to them being behind the all-black New York turned Saratoga Harlem Yankees, the two-time defending ABL champion Wilkes-Barre Barons, the Bridgeport Aer-A-Sols, and the Scranton Miners, with Scranton eventually being the new champions of the league this season.

== Roster ==
Due to information on American Basketball League players being generally hard to find (especially by the time the ABL was designated more as a minor league during its later years of existence), there are bound to be more gaps and/or inaccuracies found in certain areas on the team's roster spots than usual.

Player	Position(s)
Vic Bock	Unknown
Steve Chanecka	G
Len Cohen	Unknown
Warren Fenley	F
Tom Gallagher	Unknown
Dick Holub	C
Howie Janotta	F
Tom Kelly	G
Bill "Dick" Kraus	F
Paul Labanowski	Unknown
Lionel Malamed	G
Frank Mangiapane	G
Bob Mullens	G
Dick Murphy	G
Mel Rothbart	Unknown
Irv Rothenberg	C
Red Wallace	G

Note: In addition to all of these players, there was also an unknown with the last name of Sandmeyer (which was spelled differently in multiple ways and has been referred to in at least one website as Sandmeyer Sandmeyer for some odd reason) that was briefly on the team as well.

== American Basketball League Standings ==
Pos.	Team	Wins	Losses	Win %
1	Scranton Miners	27	11	.711
2	Bridgeport Aer-A-Sols	22	13	.629
3	Wilkes-Barre Barons	21	17	.552
4	New York / Saratoga Harlem Yankees*^{[a]}	21	17	.552
5	Paterson Crescents	17	18	.486
6	Hartford Hurricanes	11	26	.297
7	Trenton Tigers / Cohoes Marras**†^{[b]}	4	16	.200
8	Schenectady Packers†^{[c]}	0	4	.000

† – Did not survive the ABL season.
* – The New York Harlem Yankees moved to Saratoga, New York (though they presumably played some of their games in Schenectady, New York) during the season.
** – The Trenton Tigers would end up moving to Cohoes, New York after being without a home venue for a month straight before later folding operations without winning a single game in Cohoes under their new Cohoes Marras name.

== Notes ==
^{a} The New York Harlem Yankees moved to Saratoga, New York (though they presumably played some of their games in Schenectady, New York) to become the Saratoga Harlem Yankees at some currently unknown point in time during this season. ^{b} The Trenton Tigers would move to Cohoes, New York to become the Cohoes Marras on January 7, 1950, after previously playing as a road team only from December 11–28, 1949 (with their road trip leading to nothing but defeats) before the Trenton Tigers turned Cohoes Marras folded operations by either January 30 or February 1, 1950. ^{c} The Schenectady Packers would end up dropping out of the ABL on November 23, 1949.
