= 1946–47 Paterson Crescents season =

- League: American Basketball League (revived original)
- Head coach: Phil Rabin (8–14); Cy Boardman (3–9)
- General manager: Mike Conte(?)
- Owner(s): Mike Conte
- Arena: Paterson Armory

Results
- Record: 11–23 (.324)
- Place: Division: 4th (Northern)
- Playoff finish: Did not qualify

The 1946–47 Paterson Crescents season was either the fifteenth professional basketball season ever played by the Paterson Crescents (and potentially their fourteenth proper season under that name with some outlets claiming they played their first season as the Paterson Whirlwinds (and the Princeton Tigers) instead, though it's also likely that their last season they played in the Interstate Basketball League had the team competing as the Paterson Silk Sox due to their connection with the baseball team of the same name at the time, with their first season back in the (revived) ABL also having the team competing as the Washington Capitols in 1944 before becoming the Paterson Crescents again in 1945) or the third season of play for the revived franchise, depending upon the team's actual context at hand, within the revived original version of the American Basketball League. Regardless of the proper context for them, the Paterson Crescents would enter this season under the ABL's biggest point of existence ever with ten total teams competing in the Northern and Southern divisions (instead of using the typical Eastern and Western divisions like the ABL had done back in the 1927–28 season), with five teams (including Paterson) being in the Northern Division and five teams being in the Southern Division. Unfortunately for the Crescents, their losing woes throughout their history in the ABL thus far would continue onward with this season under its new formatting also, even with a coaching change from Phil Rabin to Cy Boardman occurring during the season. With their 11–23 record, Paterson would not only finish two games behind their previous season's record in terms of overall production, but they would also finish in fourth place in the Northern Division ahead of only the eventually defunct Newark Bobcats turned Kingston Chiefs turned Yonkers Chiefs, with the Crescents also being a couple of games behind the returning Troy Celtics for a third place finish. Still, even if Paterson had finished in third place in the Northern Division instead of fourth place, they would have failed to qualify for the ABL Playoffs this season anyways due to their record still being worse than that of the Elizabeth Braves, a fourth place team from the Southern Division.

== Roster ==
Due to information on American Basketball League players being generally hard to find (especially by the time the ABL was designated more as a minor league during its later years of existence), there are bound to be more gaps and/or inaccuracies found in certain areas on the team's roster spots than usual.

Player	Position(s)
Ben Auerbach	G/F
Larry Baxter	Unknown
Al Benson	C
Cy Boardman	F
Brownie Carroll	G
Bobby Dorn	C
Hal Dorn	Unknown
Bill Goebel	G
Kayo Iwanicki	Unknown
Ray Jackson	Unknown
Jim Kiernan	G
Bill Kobler	Unknown
Hal Korovin	C/F
Tony Krygier	G
Lenny Lesser	Unknown
Frank Mangiapane	G
George Milhaven	Unknown
Marty Powers	Unknown
Miggs Reilly	Unknown
Porky Rosenthal	G/F
Les Rothman	G/F
Nat Silverberg	G
Ed "Red" Stevens	C
Ed Trubin	G/F

Note: In addition to all of these players, there was also an unknown player with the last name of Reilly (who's likely suggested to be Miggs Reilly) and an unknown player with the last name of Silverman that was briefly on the team as well.

== American Basketball League Season Standings ==
Due to the number of teams in the ABL this season, this would mark the first time since the 1927–28 season where the ABL would utilize divisions within their league in a proper manner, though unlike that season, the ABL would utilize a Northern Division (which the Crescents competed in) and a Southern Division instead of the typical Eastern Division and Western Division that had been on display for most other professional leagues at the time.

=== Northern Division ===
Pos.	Team	Wins	Losses	Win %
1	Brooklyn Gothams - y	24	10	.706
2	Jersey City Atoms - x	14	22	.389
3	Troy Celtics	13	22	.371
4	Paterson Crescents	11	23	.324
5	Newark Bobcats / Kingston Chiefs / Yonkers Chiefs^{a} †	7	17	.292

† – Did not survive the ABL season.

=== Southern Division ===
Pos.	Team	Wins	Losses	Win %
1	Baltimore Bullets - z	31	3	.919
2	Philadelphia Sphas - x	19	14	.675
3	Trenton Tigers - x	17	17	.500
4	Elizabeth Braves - x	15	18	.455
5	Wilmington Bombers	15	20	.429

== Notes ==
^{a} The Newark Bobcats first transferred their franchise from Newark, New Jersey to Kingston, New York on December 23, 1946 (though they did not necessarily change their team name at the time (but if they did, they would have changed it to the Kingston Chiefs instead)) and then moved to nearby Yonkers, New York to become the Yonkers Chiefs on January 22, 1947 before folding operations entirely by the middle of February in 1947.
