= 1948–49 Paterson Crescents season =

American Basketball League season

- League: American Basketball League (revived original)
- Head coach: Leo Merson (16–14); Frank Mangiapane (8–3)
- General manager: Mike Conte(?)
- Owner(s): Mike Conte
- Arena: Paterson Armory

Results
- Record: 24–17 (.585)
- Place: Conference: T–4th
- Playoff finish: Lost ABL semifinals 2–0 to the Scranton Miners

The 1948–49 Paterson Crescents season was either the seventeenth professional basketball season ever played by the Paterson Crescents (and potentially their sixteenth proper season under that name with some outlets claiming they played their first season as the Paterson Whirlwinds (and the Princeton Tigers) instead, though it's also likely that their last season they played in the Interstate Basketball League had the team competing as the Paterson Silk Sox due to their connection with the baseball team of the same name at the time, with their first season back in the (revived) ABL also having the team competing as the Washington Capitols in 1944 before becoming the Paterson Crescents again in 1945) or the fifth season of play for the revived franchise, depending upon the team's actual context at hand, within the revived original version of the American Basketball League. Regardless of the context at hand, the Crescents would enter the league with eight teams competing in the league once again, though it wouldn't be the same eight teams from the previous season due to the Bridgeport Newfield Steelers replacing the Lancaster (Red) Roses and the long-standing Philadelphia SPHAs would move to Atlantic City, New Jersey to become the Atlantic City Tides at first (though they would return to Philadelphia, Pennsylvania to become the Philadelphia SPHAs once again by the end of the season). Unlike the previous season, however, this one would see them play a bit more inconsistently this time around, as despite them getting more wins this season, they would still see an underwhelming 16–14 start that led to Leo Merson being fired as head coach and be replaced by Frank Mangiapane as the player-coach for the rest of the season. After going 1–2 in his first three games as a player-coach, Mangiapane would lead the team to a 7–1 record for the rest of the season to get a 24–16 record for a tied fourth-place finish with the newly added Bridgeport Newfield Steelers, with a tiebreaker match determining who would go into the ABL Playoffs this season. Luckily for Paterson, their new momentum would continue onward in that tiebreaker match with a 99–80 beatdown over Bridgeport to become the #4 seed against the #2 seeded Scranton Miners. Unfortunately for the Crescents, despite keeping things close with them throughout the entire series, they couldn't get the stops necessary to upset the Miners, as Scranton would end up sweeping Paterson through two very close matches played in the semifinal round.

== Roster ==
Due to information on American Basketball League players being generally hard to find (especially by the time the ABL was designated more as a minor league during its later years of existence), there are bound to be more gaps and/or inaccuracies found in certain areas on the team's roster spots than usual.

Player	Position(s)
Len Cohen	Unknown
Donnie Forman	G
Frido Frey	F
Dick Holub	C
Ralph Kaplowitz	G/F
Walt Kaplowitz	Unknown
Tom Kelly	G
Bill "Dick" Kraus	F
Frank Mangiapane	G
Bob Mullens	G
Dick Murphy	G
Ossie Schectman	G
Butch Schwartz	G/F
Bob Smith	Unknown
Jimmy Weston	Unknown

Note: It's currently unknown who was on the team's playoff roster (and potentially the fourth place tiebreaker match) for this season, but it is known that the players that played in at least 20 games for the team this season were Len Cohen, Dick Holub, Walt Kaplowitz, Tom Kelly, Bill "Dick" Kraus, new player-coach Frank Mangiapane, Bob Mullens, Dick Murphy, Ossie Schectman, Butch Schwartz, Bob Smith, and Jimmy Weston.

== American Basketball League Standings ==
Pos.	Team	Wins	Losses	Win %
1	Wilkes-Barre Barons	29	12	.707
2	Scranton Miners	26	15	.634
3	Trenton Tigers	25	16	.610
T–4	Paterson Crescents	24	17	.585
T–4	Bridgeport Newfield Steelers	24	17	.585
6	Hartford Hurricanes / Caps	13	26	.333
7	Brooklyn Gothams	10	30	.250
8	Atlantic City Tides / Philadelphia SPHAs^{[a]}	8	26	.235

The Paterson Crescents would defeat the Bridgeport Newfield Steelers 99–80 in the fourth place tiebreaker match for the season, which would ensure their qualification for the 1949 ABL Playoffs for this season.

== American Basketball League Playoffs ==
=== American Basketball League Fourth Place Tiebreaker Playoff ===
Before the ABL began their playoffs properly, the ABL would schedule a fourth place tiebreaker playoff match between the Paterson Crescents and the Bridgeport Newfield Steelers on March 26, 1949. Fortunately for Paterson, they would end up crushing Bridgeport with a 99–80 victory in the only game played for that series, meaning that the Crescents would win the final playoff spot for the season by default.

=== American Basketball League Semifinals ===
(4) Paterson Crescents Vs. (2) Scranton Miners: Scranton win series 2–0

- Game 1: March 31, 1949 @ Scranton: Scranton 68, Paterson 66
- Game 2: April 2, 1949 @ Paterson: Scranton 67, Paterson 65

== Awards and honors ==
By the end of the season, Dick Holub would end up being the leading scorer of the entire league for the sixteenth season of its return and its 22nd overall season of its existence with a league record-high 835 points scored for an average of 20.4 points per game. This not only provided the ABL with the best scoring amounts ever recorded within the league's history throughout an entire season, but it also provided them their first player to ever average over 20 points per game throughout an entire season in their league as well.

== Notes ==
^{a} Before this season began, the Philadelphia Sphas moved from Philadelphia, Pennsylvania to Atlantic City, New Jersey to become the Atlantic City Tides in an effort to survive for the long-term. However, after having disappointing attendance results for home games at the Million Dollar Pier in Atlantic City, the team returned to Philadelphia to become the Sphas once again for the rest of the season going forward into their existence on January 16, 1949, with them playing their final home games as a professional basketball team back at their primary home court in the ballroom area of the Broadwood Hotel.
