= 1947–48 Paterson Crescents season =

American Basketball League season

- League: American Basketball League (revived original)
- Head coach: Ace Abbott (3–5); Leo Merson (16–11)
- General manager: Mike Conte(?)
- Owner(s): Mike Conte
- Arena: Paterson Armory

Results
- Record: 19–16 (.543)
- Place: Conference: 2nd
- Playoff finish: Lost ABL championship 2–1 to the Wilkes-Barre Barons.

The 1947–48 Paterson Crescents season was either the sixteenth professional basketball season ever played by the Paterson Crescents (and potentially their fifteenth proper season under that name with some outlets claiming they played their first season as the Paterson Whirlwinds (and the Princeton Tigers) instead, though it's also likely that their last season they played in the Interstate Basketball League had the team competing as the Paterson Silk Sox due to their connection with the baseball team of the same name at the time, with their first season back in the (revived) ABL also having the team competing as the Washington Capitols in 1944 before becoming the Paterson Crescents again in 1945) or the fourth season of play for the revived franchise, depending upon the team's actual context at hand, within the revived original version of the American Basketball League. Regardless of the proper context for them, the Crescents would be one of eight teams competing in the ABL in a league where divisions would be removed completely after they previously utilized the Northern Division and Southern Division from the prior season played. Despite the ABL officially seeing their first dip in quality decline entering this season after previously having their biggest looking success as a league by this point in time (at least in terms of their revived history) due to them trying to compete against both the older National Basketball League and the younger Basketball Association of America that was created this previous season, the Crescents would end up seeing their best success as a team in the ABL's history following a coaching change from player-coach Ace Abbott to player-coach Leo Merson, as Paterson would finish the season with an above-average 19–16 record for a second-place finish to place behind only the newly added (yet technically returning) Wilkes-Barre Barons from the minor Eastern Pennsylvania Basketball League. In their first playoff series match-up in the ABL against the Scranton Miners (who were previously competing as the Jersey City Atoms earlier in the season), the Crescents would sweep the Miners 2–0 in a very convincing manner before seeing the original EPBL champion Wilkes-Barre Barons in the championship round. Unfortunately for Paterson, despite them splitting the first two games and having extra time to prepare for an upset due to the Barons briefly competing in the 1948 World Professional Basketball Tournament against the rivaling NBL's champion Minneapolis Lakers, Wilkes-Barre would end up taking the decisive third and final game of the series with a 51–43 final score, thus denying the Crescents what would become their best shot at the ABL's championship.

== Roster ==
Due to information on American Basketball League players being generally hard to find (especially by the time the ABL was designated more as a minor league during its later years of existence), there are bound to be more gaps and/or inaccuracies found in certain areas on the team's roster spots than usual.

Player	Position(s)
Ace Abbott	G/F
Al Benson	C
Cy Boardman	G/F
Brownie Carroll	G
Chuck Connors	F/C
Irv Davis	G/F
Hank DeZonie	F/C
Larry Doby	Unknown
Bobby Dorn	C
Frido Frey	F
Bill Goebel	G
Ed Kassler	Unknown
Ken Keller	G
Lenny Lesser	Unknown
Frank Mangiapane	G
Bill McKeever	F
Bob Mullens	G
Dick Murphy	G
Marty Powers	Unknown
Irving Resnick	F
Ossie Schectman	G
Sid Tanenbaum	G
"Red" Patrick Walsh	Unknown

Note: In addition to all of those players, there was also an unknown player with the last name of Patricks that was briefly on the team as well. Not only that, but Verne Cox from the Hartford Hurricanes would accidentally score two points for the Paterson Crescents during a match as well. However, it's currently unknown what the team's playoff roster was for this season, though it's known that the players that played at least 16 games for Paterson in the regular season included Brownie Carroll, Chuck Connors, Frido Frey, Bill Goebel, Ed Kassler, Frank Mangiapane, Bob Mullens, Dick Murphy, Marty Powers, and Ossie Schectman.

== Standings ==
Due to the decreased number of teams this season, the ABL would remove divisions from their league this season going forward after previously using them for their previous season of play.

Pos.	Team	Wins	Losses	Win %
1	Wilkes-Barre Barons	26	8	.765
2	Paterson Crescents	19	16	.543
3	Trenton Tigers	17	15	.531
4	Jersey City Atoms / Scranton Miners^{[a]}	16	16	.500
5	Elizabeth Braves / Hartford Hurricanes^{[b]}	11	12	.478
6	Philadelphia SPHAs	13	19	.406
7	Brooklyn Gothams	8	20	.286
8	Lancaster (Red) Roses^{[c]}	1	5	.167

== Playoffs ==
=== Semifinals ===
The opponent that Paterson originally went up against the semifinal round, the Scranton Miners, previously competed as the Jersey City Atoms before they moved to Scranton to become the Miners by the end of the season.

(2) Paterson Crescents vs. (4) Scranton Miners: Paterson win series 2–0

- Game 1: March 27, 1948 @ Paterson: Paterson 82, Scranton 68
- Game 2: March 28, 1948 @ Scranton: Paterson 92, Scranton 66

=== Championship series ===
(2) Paterson Crescents vs. (1) Wilkes-Barre Barons: Wilkes-Barre win series 2–1

- Game 1: March 31, 1948 @ Wilkes-Barre: Wilkes-Barre 70, Paterson 63
- Game 2: April 4, 1948 @ Paterson: Paterson 65, Wilkes-Barre 57
- Game 3: April 17, 1948 @ Wilkes-Barre: Wilkes-Barre 51, Paterson 43

The delay from Games 2 to 3 in this series related to the Wilkes-Barre Barons competing in the 1948 World Professional Basketball Tournament (notably going up against the rivaling NBL champion Minneapolis Lakers) during this period of time.

== Notes ==
^{a} Originally, the Jersey City Atoms would move from Jersey City, New Jersey to nearby Union City, New Jersey on January 16, 1948 (though it doesn't appear that the Jersey City Atoms rebranded their team by this point in time) before moving again to Scranton, Pennsylvania to become the Scranton Miners twelve days later on January 28, 1948, for the rest of the season going forward.
^{b} The Elizabeth Braves would move from Elizabeth, New Jersey to Hartford, Connecticut on December 19, 1947, to become the Hartford Hurricanes for the rest of the season.
^{c} The Lancaster Roses (sometimes referred to as the Lancaster Red Roses instead) would end up withdrawing their operations from the ABL early in the season on December 4, 1947, to return to the Eastern Professional Basketball League not long afterward.
