= Mangiapane =

Mangiapane is an Italian surname literally translating to 'bread-eater'. Notable people with the surname include:

- Andrew Mangiapane (born 1996), Canadian ice hockey player
- Frank Mangiapane (1925–2005), American basketball player
