= 1930–31 Paterson Crescents season =

American basketball team season

- League: American Basketball League (original)
- Head coach: Bennie Borgmann (player-coach)
- General manager: Jess Weiner & Jack Summer(?)
- Owner(s): Jess Weiner & Jack Summer
- Arena: Paterson Armory

Results
- Record: 9–9 (.500)
- Place: Conference: N/A (6th/7th (1st half))
- Playoff finish: Did not qualify (Dropped out of the ABL on December 30, 1930.)

The 1930–31 Paterson Crescents season was both the Crescents' third season of existence as a professional franchise after having had their first professional season in the ABL go under the Paterson Whirlwinds name and the sixth and final season of existence for the American Basketball League, which was the first professional basketball league that had truly attempted to go fully national after previous professional basketball leagues were mostly regional at the time. However, Paterson's history as a franchise had supposedly lasted as far back as 1909 by first appearing under their original Paterson Whirlwinds name in the Hudson River Basketball League (as well as the Princeton Tigers in the Eastern Basketball League) before becoming the Paterson Crescents properly in the next two seasons there (and for most of their existence) soon afterward as well, with a brief year of independent play later giving them appearances in the New York State Basketball League, the Interstate Basketball League, the Pennsylvania State Basketball League (for some odd reason), and the Metropolitan Basketball League as the Paterson Crescents before eventually being picked up by the ABL in 1928 as the Paterson Whirlwinds, with this season marking at least their 20th overall season of play (due to two seasons being lost due to World War I) and at least their 13th overall professional basketball season with some sort of professional basketball league when combining the histories of all of these leagues with this season of play here. Regardless of the overall sentiment at hand here, Paterson's franchise would be one of seven teams competing in what would later become the original version of the ABL's final season of existence. However, despite that ominous tone at hand, Paterson wouldn't even be able to finish the first half of the season properly on their ends, as due to financial issues that stemmed from the Great Depression, the Crescents franchise would drop out of the league on December 30, 1930 (just one day before New Year's Eve), joining the three-time ABL champion Cleveland Rosenblums as the only other team to fold operations this season (despite them both having average records when they folded). Despite the ABL only fielding a total of five teams for the rest of its season, it would survive until the end without a hitch throughout the 1931 year not long afterward, but the aforementioned long-term effects of the Great Depression would cause an end to the ABL's original run not long afterward (though the ABL would later revive itself a couple of years later). As for the Paterson Crescents, the original franchise wouldn't really play professionally ever again following this season's rough conclusion, but the name would live on within the revived ABL in the 1940s with the original Washington Capitols team rebranding itself to the Paterson Crescents during that same season they were created (with these specific Crescents continuing to exist there up until 1951).

== Roster ==
Due to information on American Basketball League players being generally hard to find, there are bound to be more gaps and/or inaccuracies found in certain areas on the team's roster spots than usual.

Player	Position
Babe Artus	G/F
Bennie Borgmann	F
Red Conaty	G/F
Bob Many	G/F
Don Nagle	F/C
Honey Russell	G/F
Tony Schiffer	G/F
Fats Wyka	F

== American Basketball League Standings ==
First Half
Team	Wins	Losses	Winning %
Brooklyn Visitations	14	7	.667
Fort Wayne Hoosiers	13	9	.591
Rochester Centrals	10	9	.526
Toledo Red Man Tobaccos	8	13	.381
Chicago Bruins	7	14	.333
Cleveland Rosenblums*	6	6	.500
Paterson Crescents**	9	9	.500

* – The two-time defending ABL champions (and three-time overall ABL champions) in the Cleveland Rosenblums would surprisingly end up dropping out of the league on December 8, 1930 due to the long-term effects of the Great Depression kicking in for them.
** – The (original) Paterson Crescents franchise would end up dropping out of the league near the end of the first half of the season on December 30, 1930.

Second Half
Team	Wins	Losses	Winning %
Fort Wayne Hoosiers	11	5	.688
Chicago Bruins	11	5	.688
Brooklyn Visitations	8	8	.500
Rochester Centrals	5	10	.333
Toledo Red Man Tobaccos	4	11	.274

== Awards and honors ==
By the end of the season, Bennie Borgmann would end up being the leading scorer of the entire league for the third straight season in a row in its sixth and final season of its original existence with 290 points scored for an average of 8.8 points per game. As of 2026, Borgmann remains the only leading scorer in the original ABL's history to enter the Naismith Basketball Hall of Fame due to his entry in 1961, with Bobby McDermott in the league's revived history years later joining him as the only other leading scorer in league history to enter the Hall of Fame alongside him.
