= The Memphis Blues =

1913 blues song by W. C. Handy and George A. Norton

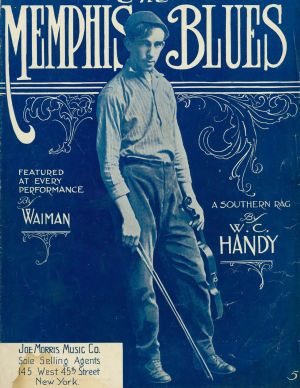
- Sheet music cover, 1912

Single by Victor Military Band
- Published: November 10, 1913 Theron C. Bennett Co., New York
- Released: October 1914
- Recorded: July 15, 1914
- Studio: Victor Studios, Camden, New Jersey
- Genre: Southern rag, blues
- Length: 2:58
- Label: Victor 17619
- Composer: W. C. Handy
- Lyricist: George A. Norton

"The Memphis Blues" is a song described by its composer, W. C. Handy, as a "southern rag". It was self-published by Handy in September 1912 and has been recorded by many artists over the years.

== "Mr. Crump" ==
Subtitled "Mr. Crump", "The Memphis Blues" is said to be based on a campaign song written by Handy for Edward Crump, a mayoral candidate in Memphis, Tennessee. Handy claimed credit for writing "Mr. Crump", but Memphis musicians say it was written by Handy's clarinetist, Paul Wyer. Many musicologists question how much "Mr. Crump" actually shared with "The Memphis Blues", since the words, taken from an old folk song, "Mama Don' 'low", do not match up with the melody of "The Memphis Blues". Many think "Mr. Crump" was probably the same song as "Mr. Crump Don't Like It", later recorded by Frank Stokes of the Beale Street Sheiks (Paramount Race series, September 1927).

According to a member of Handy's band, S. L. "Stack" Mangham, the tune copyrighted by Handy in 1912 was based on one heard by Handy at a dance in Cleveland, Mississippi around 1903, when it was played by a three-piece string band now known to have been led by Prince McCoy.

== New York ==
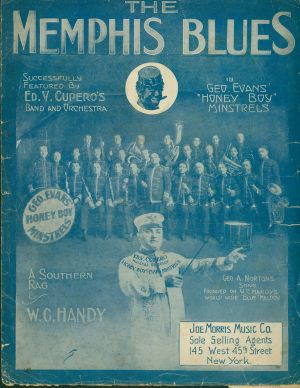
Sheet music cover, 1913

Handy first published the song as an instrumental. He immediately sold it to the music publisher Theron Bennett, who took it to New York to attempt to promote it. Handy later claimed he had been robbed. In any case, Bennett convinced George "Honey Boy" Evans to use it for his "Honey Boy" Minstrels. Bennett hired a professional songwriter, George A. Norton, to write lyrics for it, and Evans had his director, Edward V. Cupero, arrange it for his band. Bennett published it a year later, but still the sheet music did poorly. Bennett's 1913 publication advertises it as "Founded on W.C. Handy's World Wide 'Blue' Note Melody."

== Recordings ==
"Memphis Blues", Victor Military Band, July 15, 1914

It was not until Victor Recording Company's house band (Victor Military Band, Victor 17619, July 15, 1914) and Columbia's house band (Prince's Band, Columbia A-5591, July 24) recorded the song in 1914 that "The Memphis Blues" began to do well. The original begins in the key of E-flat major. In 2019, this version was selected for preservation in the National Recording Registry as "culturally, historically, or aesthetically significant" by the Library of Congress.

Harry James recorded a version in 1942 (released in 1944 as Columbia 36713).

== See also ==
- List of pre-1920 jazz standards
- Stuck Inside of Mobile with the Memphis Blues Again

== Bibliography ==
- Charters, Samuel B. (1975). The Country Blues. Da Capo Press. ISBN 0-306-70678-4.
- Cheseborough, Steve (2004). Blues Traveling: The Holy Sites of Delta Blues. University Press of Mississippi. ISBN 1-57806-650-6.
- Hamm, Charles (1995). Putting Popular Music in its Place. Cambridge University Press. ISBN 0-521-47198-2.
- Komara, Edward (2005). Encyclopedia of the Blues. Routledge. ISBN 0-415-92701-3.
- Tosches, Nick (2002). Where Dead Voices Gather. Back Bay Books. ISBN 0-316-89537-7.
