= 1944–45 Washington Capitols / Paterson Crescents season =

- League: American Basketball League (revived original)
- Head coach: John "Pete" Barry (Washington; 2–6); Mike Conte (Washington; 0–2); Mac Kinsbruner (Paterson; 1–15)
- General manager: Mike Conte (Washington & Paterson)
- Owner(s): Mike Conte (Washington & Paterson)
- Arena: Riverside Stadium (Washington); Paterson Armory (Paterson)

Results
- Record: 3–23 (.115)
- Place: Conference: 6th
- Playoff finish: Did not qualify

The 1944–45 Washington Capitols / Paterson Crescents season was either the thirteenth professional basketball season ever played by the Paterson Crescents (and potentially their twelfth proper season under that name with some outlets claiming they played their first season as the Paterson Whirlwinds (and the Princeton Tigers) instead, though it's also likely that their last season they played in the Interstate Basketball League had the team competing as the Paterson Silk Sox due to their connection with the baseball team of the same name at the time) or the first season of play for the revived franchise (alongside their only season playing as the Washington Capitols expansion franchise, depending upon the team's actual context at hand) of the revived original version of the American Basketball League. Regardless of the actual context for this specific team's history, they would compete (and in a sense, return) within the ABL's eighteenth season of existence when combining the six seasons of its original run with the twelve seasons in its more recent run at this point in time after their hiatus in relation to the Great Depression, even in spite of this particular team technically being created and then operating during World War II (although the team was operating near the end of that wartime era). This team would end up being one of six teams competing in the ABL in a period of time where World War II was nearing its end, with the ABL also ditching the split season format that they had used for most of its history for good, starting with this season up until that league ended up reaching its end by 1953. However, this season would end up being a very poor one for this team, especially if one doesn't consider them an expansion team and instead views them as a continuation of the original Paterson Crescents team from the original ABL that operated from the late 1920s until the early 1930s. The Washington Capitols would end up performing so poorly that they would end up getting a 2–8 record between the coaching done by former Original Celtics player John "Pete" Barry and (original?) team owner Mike Conte before the team essentially moved from Washington, D.C. to Paterson, New Jersey on New Year's Day of January 1, 1945, with the Paterson Crescents team somehow performing even worse by comparison despite having Mac Kinsbrunner as a player-coach for the rest of the season. Once the team became the Paterson Crescents, they would only win once more for a 1–15 finish in Paterson to get an overall record of 3–23 to conclude the season; despite the poor record for their first season in the revived version of the original ABL, the Paterson Crescents would end up returning to the ABL for the following season afterward, with the Washington Capitols later having a different iteration appear with the same name by the 1951–52 season.

== Rosters ==
Due to information on American Basketball League players being generally hard to find, there are bound to be more gaps and/or inaccuracies found in certain areas on the team's roster spots than usual. However, in this case, there will be a listed out separation for who played on the Washington Capitols specifically and who played for the Paterson Crescents specifically.

=== Washington Capitols Roster ===
Player	Position(s)
Sid Blair	F
Eddie Boyle	F/C
Nat "Lovey" Brown	G/F
Pete Caruso	G
Dan Christie	G/F
Ed Conaty	G/F
Bobby Dorn	C
Nat Frankel	F
Pat Goldstein	F
Roger Jorgensen	C
Steve Juenger	F/C
Hal Lambert	G
Jack McGuirk	G/F
Sam Milanovich	F
Abe Novak	G
John O'Brien	F
Steve O'Brien	G
Jackie Peters	G/F
Cy Rosenberg	G/F
Herm Schaefer	G/F
Jimmy Smith	G

Note: In addition to all of these players, Washington would also briefly have an unknown guard with the last name of Lytle that would be on the team as well.

=== Paterson Crescents Roster ===
Player	Position(s)
Jules Bender	G
Herb Bergman	F/C
Sol Broder	F/C
Tommy Byrnes	F/C
Whitey Carmel	G
Dan Christie	G/F
Ed Conaty	G/F
Joe Diemar	G
Scotty Evans	G
Zeppy Feiter	G
Danny "Bud" Gaines	G/F
George Glamack	C
Stretch Johnson	G/F
Steve Juenger	F/C
Johnny Kelly	G
Mac Kinsbruner	G
Don Kotter	C
Bob McGinnis	F
Jack McGuirk	G/F
Dick Nochimson	G/F
John O'Brien	F
Red Pasch	G
Jackie Peters	G/F
Lou Possner	F/C
Morris Pressman	G/F
Tom Ross	C
Doc Wright	G

Interestingly, Dan Christie, Ed Conaty, Steve Juenger, Jack McGuirk, John O'Brien, and Jackie Peters would be the only players to be with both the Washington Capitols and the Paterson Crescents for this season.

== American Basketball League Standings ==
Pos.	Team	Wins	Losses	Win %
1	Philadelphia SPHAs	22	8	.733
2	Trenton Tigers	21	9	.700
3	Wilmington Bombers	14	14	.500
4	Baltimore Bullets	14	16	.467
5	New York Westchesters / Westchester Indians / New York Gothams^{[a]}	11	15	.423
6	Washington Capitols / Paterson Crescents^{[b]}	3	23	.115
7	Washington Capitols^{[b]}	2	8	.200
8	Paterson Crescents^{[b]}	1	15	.063

== Notes ==
^{a} The New York Westchesters (sometimes referred to as the Westchester Indians) would move from White Plains, New York to nearby Brooklyn, New York on January 20, 1945, thus subsequently changing their team name from the New York Westchesters (or Westchester Indians) to the New York Gothams in the process.
^{b} The Washington Capitols (no relation to the Washington Capitols team from the BAA/NBA that briefly moved to the ABL at one point in time themselves) would move from Washington, D.C. to Paterson, New Jersey on January 1, 1945, thus subsequently changing their team name from the original Washington Capitols ABL team to the Paterson Crescents in the process. The Capitols held a 2–8 record before moving to Paterson, while the Crescents had a 1–15 record for the rest of the season going forward.
