= 1929–30 Paterson Crescents season =

American basketball team season

- League: American Basketball League (original)
- Head coach: Artie Powers (player-coach)
- General manager: Jess Weiner & Jack Summer(?)
- Owner(s): Jess Weiner & Jack Summer
- Arena: Paterson Armory

Results
- Record: 18–36 (.333)
- Place: Conference: 6th (both halves)
- Playoff finish: Did not qualify

The 1929–30 Paterson Crescents season was both the Crescents' second (and final full) season of existence as a professional franchise (as well as their only full season in the ABL under that name) after having had their first professional season in the ABL go under the Paterson Whirlwinds name and the fifth season of existence for the American Basketball League, which was the first professional basketball league that had truly attempted to go fully national after previous professional basketball leagues were mostly regional at the time. However, Paterson's history as a franchise had supposedly lasted as far back as 1909 by first appearing under their original Paterson Whirlwinds name in the Hudson River Basketball League (as well as the Princeton Tigers in the Eastern Basketball League) before becoming the Paterson Crescents properly in the next two seasons there (and for most of their existence) soon afterward as well, with a brief year of independent play later giving them appearances in the New York State Basketball League, the Interstate Basketball League, the Pennsylvania State Basketball League (for some odd reason), and the Metropolitan Basketball League as the Paterson Crescents before eventually being picked up by the ABL in 1928 as the Paterson Whirlwinds, with this season marking at least their 19th overall season of play (due to two seasons being lost due to World War I) and at least their 12th overall professional basketball season with some sort of professional basketball league when combining the histories of all of these leagues with this season of play here. Regardless of the overall sentiment at hand here, Paterson's franchise would still end up being one of the worst franchises of the entire league, if not the worst franchise in the league by the end of the season when it was all said and done. During the first half of the season, the ABL saw eight teams competing in the league to start out this season, but the number dwindled down to seven following the sudden departure of the Original Celtics following their quick return to the ABL after a season-long hiatus and then six by the time the first half of the season just about concluded when the Syracuse All-Americans decided to withdraw from the league on January 6, 1930 (with Syracuse deciding to forfeit their final four games of the season). As a result of that fact, Paterson would technically end up finishing the first half of the season in last place with a below-average 10–14 record for a 6th place finish (though one can say they technically weren't last there due to the placement of the Syracuse All-Americans (and to a much lesser extent, the Original Celtics) there). Not only that, but the second half of the season would be even worse for them since they ended that half of the season with an even worse 8–22 to finish in dead last place in the league, which easily led to them failing to qualify for the championship round in the ABL this season.

== Roster ==
Due to information on American Basketball League players being generally hard to find, there are bound to be more gaps and/or inaccuracies found in certain areas on the team's roster spots than usual.

Player	Position
Peter Babbles	G
Howie Bollerman	C
Bennie Borgmann	F
Bob Grody	F/C
Dink Irwin	G/F
Leo Malone	F/C
Willie McDonald	F
Bill McElwain	F
Stretch Meehan	C
Jake Moskow	G/F
Don Nagle	F/C
Artie Powers	G/F
Frank Roxbury	F
Tony Schiffer	G/F
Reds Sherr	F/C
Frank Stuchbury	G
Jerry Sullivan	G/F
Ike Walton	G/F
Fats Wyka	F

Note: In addition to these players, Paterson also included an unknown forward with the last name of Roe and an unknown center with the last of Weaver as a part of their roster for this season as well.

== American Basketball League Standings ==
First Half
Team	Wins	Losses	Winning %
Cleveland Rosenblums	17	7	.738
Brooklyn Visitations	15	9	.625
Rochester Centrals	14	10	.583
Fort Wayne Hoosiers	12	12	.500
Chicago Bruins	12	12	.500
Paterson Crescents	10	14	.417
New York (Original) Celtics†*	5	5	.500
Syracuse All-Americans†	4	20	.167

† – Withdrew from the ABL before the first half of the season officially ended, with the New York (Original) Celtics dropping out of the league on December 19, 1929 and the Syracuse All-Americans dropping out of the ABL (and forfeiting their final four games of the first half of the season by default) on January 6, 1930 near the end of the first half of the season.
* – Withdrew from the ABL after playing only ten total games during the first half of this season, with their games being stricken from the official league record books during this season despite having an average record this season.

Second Half
Team	Wins	Losses	Winning %
Rochester Centrals	19	11	.633
Cleveland Rosenblums	18	12	.600
Chicago Bruins	17	13	.567
Brooklyn Visitations	15	15	.500
Fort Wayne Hoosiers	13	17	.433
Paterson Crescents	8	22	.267
