= 1945–46 Paterson Crescents season =

- League: American Basketball League (revived original)
- Head coach: Bennie Borgmann (13–19); Moe Frankel (0–2)
- General manager: Mike Conte(?)
- Owner(s): Mike Conte
- Arena: Paterson Armory

Results
- Record: 13–21 (.382)
- Place: Conference: 6th
- Playoff finish: Did not qualify

The 1945–46 Paterson Crescents season was either the fourteenth professional basketball season ever played by the Paterson Crescents (and potentially their thirteenth proper season under that name with some outlets claiming they played their first season as the Paterson Whirlwinds (and the Princeton Tigers) instead, though it's also likely that their last season they played in the Interstate Basketball League had the team competing as the Paterson Silk Sox due to their connection with the baseball team of the same name at the time, with their first season back in the (revived) ABL also having the team competing as the Washington Capitols in 1944 before becoming the Paterson Crescents again in 1945) or the second season of play for the revived franchise, depending upon the team's actual context at hand, within the revived original version of the American Basketball League. Regardless of what the actual context for this team's season at hand, the Crescents would be one of six teams competing in the ABL this season, with this season not having any changes occurring with any teams whatsoever for its most stable season in this league's revival era due to World War II concluding before this season began. While the Crescents would perform a lot better this time around when compared to their previous season when they operated both as the Washington Capitols and the Paterson Crescents, Paterson would still end up being considered the worst team competing in the ABL for this season. With a 13–21 record on their ends (including a late coaching change through replacing Hall of Famer Bennie Borgmann with Moe Frankel), the Crescents would not only be one game behind the Trenton Tigers for a fifth place finish, but also be two games behind the Wilmington Bombers for a fourth place finish as well. As such, Paterson would once again fail to qualify for the ABL Playoffs by the end of this season.

== Roster ==
Due to information on American Basketball League players being generally hard to find, there are bound to be more gaps and/or inaccuracies found in certain areas on the team's roster spots than usual.

Player	Position(s)
Ben Auerbach	G/F
Hank Beenders	F/C
Jules Bender	G
Cy Boardman	F
Sol Broder	F
Dan Christie	F
Chuck Connors	F/C
Bobby Dorn	F/C
Moe Frankel	G/F
Johnny Johnson	F
Steve Juenger	F/C
Jerry Kelly	G/F
Harry Klomp	F/C
Chris Langvardt	G/F
Russ Miller	F
Johnny Mroczowski	G/F
George Pajak	F
Jerry Rizzo	G/F
Les Rothman	G/F
Nick Shaback	G/F
Barney Wilk	C/F

== American Basketball League Standings ==
Pos.	Team	Wins	Losses	Win %
T–1	Baltimore Bullets	21	13	.618
T–1	Philadelphia SPHAs	21	13	.618
3	New York Gothams	18	16	.529
4	Wilmington Bombers	15	19	.441
5	Trenton Tigers	14	20	.412
6	Paterson Crescents	13	21	.382
