= 1928–29 Paterson Whirlwinds season =

American basketball team season

- League: American Basketball League (original)
- Head coach: Pop Morgenweck (6–22); Artie Powers (3–6)
- General manager: Jess Weiner & Jack Summer(?)
- Owner(s): Jess Weiner & Jack Summer
- Arena: Paterson Armory

Results
- Record: 9–28 (.243)
- Place: Conference: 8th (both halves)
- Playoff finish: Did not qualify

The 1928–29 Paterson Whirlwinds season was technically the first and only full professional basketball season of play for the Crescents team under that name held in Paterson, New Jersey during the fourth season of existence for the American Basketball League, which was the first professional basketball league that had truly attempted to go fully national after previous professional basketball leagues were mostly regional at the time. However, Paterson's history as a franchise had supposedly lasted as far back as 1909 by first appearing as the Whirlwinds properly in the Hudson River Basketball League (as well as the Princeton Tigers in the Eastern Basketball League) before becoming the Paterson Crescents in the next two seasons there (and for most of their existence) soon afterward as well, with a brief year of independent play later giving them appearances in the New York State Basketball League, the Interstate Basketball League, the Pennsylvania State Basketball League (for some odd reason), and the Metropolitan Basketball League as the Paterson Crescents before eventually being picked up by the ABL this season as the Paterson Whirlwinds once again, with this season marking at least their 18th overall season of play (due to two seasons being lost due to World War I) and at least their 11th overall professional basketball season with some sort of professional basketball league when combining the histories of all of these leagues with this season of play here. Regardless of the overall sentiment at hand here, Paterson's franchise would be one of eight teams competing in the ABL this season, which would return to a split season format after previously using a proper regular season and playoff formatting. Not only that, but the Whirlwinds would end up becoming the weakest team competing within the ABL this season, as they would end up finishing in last place throughout the entire season. In the first half of the season, the Whirlwinds would end up being the only team to have less than 10 wins throughout that half of the season, as they ended up finishing that half of the season with a poor 6–19 record to become dead last place in the league there. The second of the season would be even worse for them, however, as after losing three straight games to start that half of the season, Paterson would fire Pop Morgenweck as the head coach and replace him with player-coach Artie Powers for the rest of the season, which did little to help them out since they still ended up placing in last place in that half of the season with a 3–9 record with Powers' 3–6 coaching record. Following this failed season's conclusion, Paterson would continue competing in the ABL in spite of their poor performances, though they would return to their more common Paterson Crescents name by the time the upcoming ABL season began.

== Roster ==
Due to information on American Basketball League players being generally hard to find, there are bound to be more gaps and/or inaccuracies found in certain areas on the team's roster spots than usual.

Player	Position
Tony Calland	G
Pete Dolan	F
Jimmy Gordan	G
Bob Griebe	F/C
Nick Harvey	G
Mickey Husta	G/F
Harry Knoblauch	F/C
Hank Knudsen	C
Moyer Krakovitch	G
Charlie Lajeskie	G/F
Stretch Langdell	F/C
Siggy Makofski	G/F
Leo Malone	F/C
Stretch Meehan	C
Jake Moskow	G/F
Mike Music	G
Chickie Passon	G/F
Jim Picken	G/F
Artie Powers	G/F
Harry Riconda	G
Frank Roxbury	F
Reds Sherr	F/C
Lefty Topel	G
Fats Wyka	F
Gus Yorkes	G

== American Basketball League Standings ==
First Half
Team	Wins	Losses	Winning %
Cleveland Rosenblums	19	9	.679
Fort Wayne Hoosiers	18	10	.643
Brooklyn Visitations	15	12	.556
Chicago Bruins	15	12	.556
New York Hakoahs	13	16	.448
Trenton (Royal) Bengals	12	16	.429
Rochester Centrals	11	15	.423
Paterson Whirlwinds	6	19	.240

Second Half
Team	Wins	Losses	Winning %
Fort Wayne Hoosiers	11	3	.786
Cleveland Rosenblums	10	4	.714
Brooklyn Visitations	10	4	.714
Rochester Centrals	7	7	.500
New York Hakoahs	5	9	.357
Trenton (Royal) Bengals	4	8	.333
Chicago Bruins	4	10	.286
Paterson Whirlwinds	3	9	.250
