= 1950–51 Paterson Crescents season =

- League: American Basketball League (revived original)
- Head coach: Herbie Gershon
- General manager: Herbie Gershon(?)
- Arena: Paterson Armory

Results
- Record: 21–16 (.568)
- Place: Conference: 2nd/3rd
- Playoff finish: ABL Playoffs were considered aborted due to the Utica Pros not wanting to compete against the Scranton Miners in the semifinal round alongside the lack of available armories for play in the playoffs this season. (The Scranton Miners were considered the ABL champions by default for this season due to their regular season record.)

The 1950–51 Paterson Crescents season was either the nineteenth and final professional basketball season ever played by the Paterson Crescents (and potentially their eighteenth and final proper season under that name with some outlets claiming they played their first season as the Paterson Whirlwinds (and the Princeton Tigers) instead, though it's also likely that their last season they played in the Interstate Basketball League had the team competing as the Paterson Silk Sox due to their connection with the baseball team of the same name at the time, with their first season back in the (revived) ABL also having the team competing as the Washington Capitols in 1944 before becoming the Paterson Crescents again in 1945) or the seventh and final season of play for the revived franchise, depending upon the team's actual context at hand, within the revived original version of the American Basketball League. Regardless of the proper context for them, Paterson would be one of seven teams competing in the weakened up version of the ABL to compete for the league's championship under its 24th overall season of play. While the ABL initially would have most of its teams survive throughout the majority of the season, one team in the Wilkes-Barre Barons would end up leaving the ABL near the end of the season due to the defending ABL champion Scranton Miners demanding a $1,500 bond from Eddie White, Sr.'s Barons team, which would cause a massive chain reaction toward the rest of the season's playoff picture not long afterward. With both the Paterson Crescents and the Bridgeport Aer-A-Sols starting to have home court issues this season due to them not having local armories to play professional basketball games in for the ABL Playoffs this season combined with the replacement playoff team for the season, the Utica Pros, not wanting to compete against the #1 seeded Scranton Miners due in part to their own financial issues, the ABL decided to ultimately cancel the ABL Playoffs entirely for the first and only time (or second time if one were to count the automatic championship won by the Wilmington Blue Bombers back in the 1941–42 season from the original split season format), with them later declaring the Scranton Miners the automatic champions by default due to them having the best record in the regular season (similar to what happened in an overall format with the 1941–42 Wilmington Blue Bombers that season). However, while Bridgeport would end up having a resolution to compete in the ABL for the 1951–52 season, the Paterson Crescents would not, which would lead to the permanent end of the Paterson franchise soon afterward. Interestingly, this season would also be notable for involving the only professional basketball season ever played by Irwin Dambrot due to the more local nature of the ABL's scheduling while competing in a professional manner and completing his work at the Columbia University College of Dental Medicine in relation to an upcoming career at dentistry, with Dambrot not only being drafted by the New York Knicks as the 7th pick of the 1950 NBA draft, but also later being convicted in the 1951 college basketball point-shaving scandal in relation to his previous time spent playing with the City College of New York basketball team (and consequently being permanently banned from the NBA and ABL not long afterward, with his prior time in the ABL later leading to that league's eventual end in a partial manner due to multiple teams wanting to use players that were ultimately convicted in the college basketball point-shaving scandal themselves).

== Roster ==
Due to information on American Basketball League players being generally hard to find (especially by the time the ABL was designated more as a minor league during its later years of existence), there are bound to be more gaps and/or inaccuracies found in certain areas on the team's roster spots than usual.

Player	Position(s)
Len Cohen	Unknown
Irwin Dambrot	F
Harry Donovan	G
Bucky Hatchett	Unknown
Howie Janotta	F
Joel Kaufman	Unknown
Tom Kelly	G
Dick Kore	Unknown
Herb Krautblatt	G
Bob Mullens	G
Tom Muller	Unknown
Don Parsons	Unknown
Irv Rothenberg	C
Ed Sadowski	C
Red Wallace	G

== American Basketball League Standings ==
Pos.	Team	Wins	Losses	Win %
1	Scranton Miners	28	8	.778
2	Wilkes-Barre Barons^{×}^{[a]}	28	11	.718
3	Paterson Crescents	21	16	.568
4	Bridgeport Aer-A-Sols	18	15	.545
5	Utica Pros^{[b]}	17	22	.436
6	Saratoga Harlem Yankees	5	25	.167
7	Allentown / Carbondale Aces^{[c]}	4	24	.105

× – Withdrew from the ABL this season on February 22, 1951, following a $1,500 bond demand from the Scranton Miners, which led to the Utica Pros being the intended replacement team for the 1951 ABL Playoffs in the process.
* – The Allentown Aces moved from Allentown, Pennsylvania to nearby Carbondale, Pennsylvania during the season on December 28, 1950, following a 1–12 start to their season.

== Aborted American Basketball League Playoffs ==
Originally, the ABL intended to have a proper playoff series occur with the best four teams in the league competing against each other in something similar to what the formerly rivaling National Basketball League had done in certain seasons without divisions at hand where the best four teams of the season would compete against each other (in this case, had the Wilkes-Barre Barons not left the ABL left in the season, it would have had the defending ABL champion Scranton Miners competing against the recently rebranded Bridgeport Aer-A-Sols and the Wilkes-Barre Barons would have competed against the Paterson Crescents for this season). However, because Wilkes-Barre unexpectedly withdrew from the ABL late in the season on February 22, 1951, due to a $1,500 bond demand from Scranton themselves, the planned ABL playoffs had Scranton going up against the new Utica Pros expansion team (who took on the fourth place spot in the ABL officially for this season) and the Paterson Crescents would go up against the Bridgeport Aer-A-Sols as the new #2 Vs. #3 seeded match-up. However, before the ABL playoffs were planned to begin, Utica voted to not participate in the planned (alternative) playoff set-up against Scranton; that surprising vote combined with the lack of armories for teams to compete in during a planned playoff tournament for the ABL (specifically for both Paterson and Bridgeport) led to the league scrapping the ABL playoffs entirely this time around (which would be somewhat similar to what happened in their 1941–42 season), with the Scranton Miners being crowned the two-time champions of the ABL following this decision. This failure by the ABL's hands would help further lead to the ABL's decline and then conclusion that happened in the 1950s decade, as well as help lead to the Paterson Crescents leaving the ABL by the end of this season alongside the aforementioned Utica Pros, although it's suggested that the Utica Pros would end up becoming the Elmira Colonels instead.

== Notes ==
^{a} The Wilkes-Barre Barons withdrew from the ABL this season on February 22, 1951 (a fair amount of time before the planned ABL playoffs were meant to begin) following a $1,500 bond demand from the Scranton Miners.
^{b} The Utica Pros were named the replacement team to enter what would have been the 1951 ABL Playoffs had they been able to begin properly, with Utica being the (new) #4 seed for the season while the Bridgeport Aer-A-Sols were named the new #3 seed instead of being the #4 seed and the Paterson Crescents were named the new #2 seed instead of being the #3 seed for this season.
^{c} The Allentown Aces moved from Allentown, Pennsylvania to nearby Carbondale, Pennsylvania during the season on December 28, 1950, following a 1–12 start to their season to become the Carbondale Aces for the rest of the season.
