= George Washington Educational Campus =

Public school campus in New York City

Coordinates: 40.855819°N 73.926952°W

George Washington High School
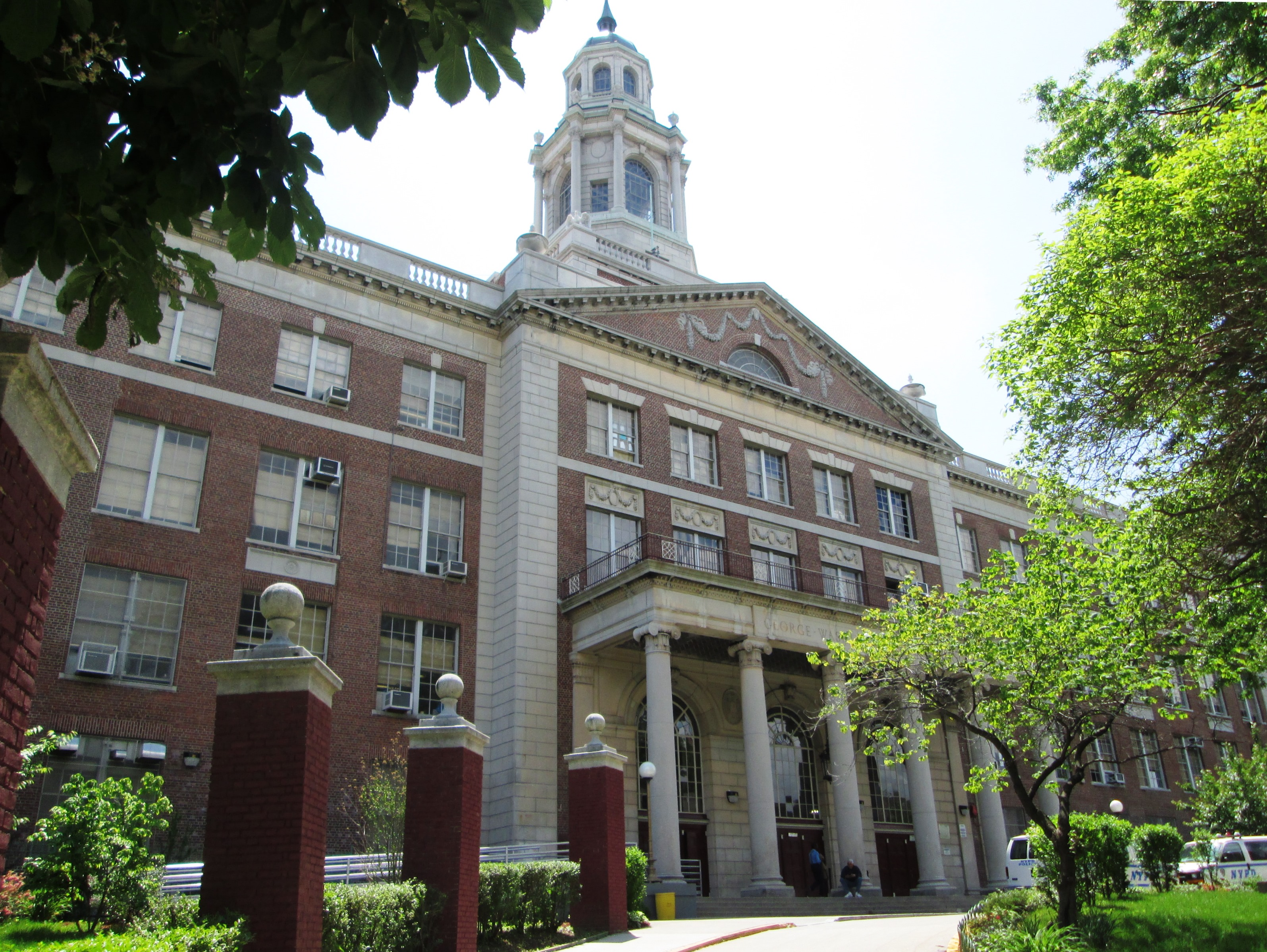
- George Washington Educational Campus

Location
- 549 Audubon Avenue; New York City, New York 10040

Information
- Grades: 9-12
- Language: English
- Colors: Orange and Black
- Mascot: Trojan
- Team name: Trojans, Lady Trojans

The George Washington Educational Campus is a facility of the New York City Department of Education located at 549 Audubon Avenue at West 193rd Street in the Fort George neighborhood of Washington Heights, Manhattan, New York City, United States. Within the building are located four schools:

- The first floor is the High School for Media and Communications (M463).
- The second floor houses The College Academy, formerly the High School for International Business and Finance (M462).
- The third floor houses the High School for Health Careers and Sciences (M468).
- The fourth floor houses the High School for Law and Public Service (M467).

The building is located on the site of the former Fort George Amusement Park. The school opened on February 2, 1917, as an annex of Morris High School. George Washington High School is a was founded in 1919, and moved into the building in 1925. It was known by that name until 1999, when the building was divided into the four small schools.

George Washington Education Campus has a Works Progress Administration (WPA) mural, The Evolution of Music, painted by Lucienne Bloch in 1938. This mural was painted in a room originally used as a music room and later as a dance studio.

The campus also houses one of only two NJROTC units in New York City, in its basement, led by Commander Michael S Payne (Ret.) and Chief Petty Officer John Sikora (Ret.). New York-Presbyterian Hospital maintains a clinic on the first floor.

== History ==
George Washington High School was relatively prestigious in the decades after its 1925 founding. Notable alumni included singer Harry Belafonte, Chairman of the Federal Reserve Alan Greenspan, U.S. Senator Jacob Javits, U.S. Secretary of State and Nobel Peace Prize winner Henry Kissinger, and psychopharmacologist and professor Murray Jarvik.

During the 1960s and 1970s, Washington Heights' Black and Latino population increased. New York City public schools also faced serious overcrowding problems. Today, the student bodies of the four George Washington schools are overwhelmingly Latino, with a minority Black presence, and less than 5% of students identify as White or Asian.

During this period, discontent with academics and school policy lead to a wave of student demonstrations, supported by a group of parents who pushed to set up an information table in the school's lobby in order to answer questions and hear complaints regarding the school. However, the United Federation of Teachers, which also clashed with students and parents over the 1964 school boycott and the 1968 teachers' strike – perceived this as an attempt to subvert teachers' authority, leading them to strike after the administration reached a compromise with parents over the table. In 1970, George Washington saw the resignation of three principals and multiple serious incidents of violence amongst students as well as against teachers and security guards; while many safety improvements were made throughout the 1970s, its academic performance continued to decline.

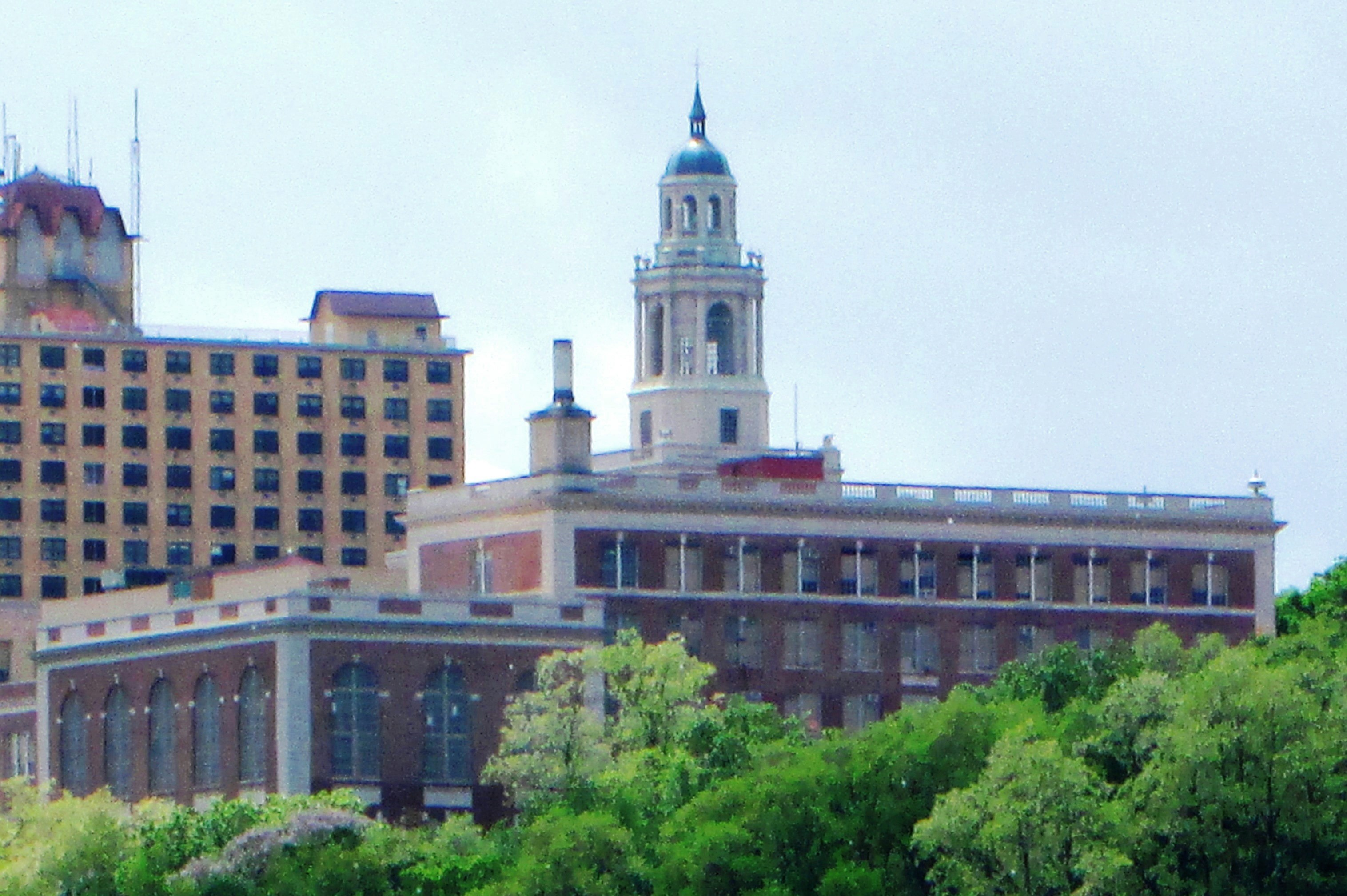
George Washington Educational Campus as seen from The Bronx

In 1999, the school took its present form as the George Washington Educational Campus composed of four smaller schools. In 2018, High School for Health Careers and Sciences was threatened with closure in 2018 due to poor performance, although the proposal was later withdrawn. As of 2019, this school is the only one of the four with a four-year graduation rate above the citywide average. Part of the schools' academic difficulties is due to their high proportion of English Language Learners (as high as 50% for The College Academy and the High School for Media and Communications), who have lower graduation rates across the city.

== Sports ==
=== Football ===
In 1988, the George Washington Trojans football team won the 1988 City "B" Division Championship. On November 23, 2008, the squad defeated Far Rockaway High School (Queens), 20–14, in an overtime finish at the Midwood Athletic Complex in Brooklyn. The victory earned GW the 2008 PSAL Cup Championship, their first football title since 1988.

=== Baseball ===
Baseball coach Steve Mandl won three championships in 27 years, and 26 division titles, and among his former players is Manny Ramirez. He was suspended by the PSAL for 16 months for an alleged recruiting violation alleged by a rival coach. However, in a reversal by the New York City Education Department, he was reinstated to his job thereafter, paid his back pay, and his suspension was expunged from his record. The case prompted questions about how the PSAL handles charges brought without witnesses or evidence. According to The New York Times,

"The Mandl case offers another perspective: the possibility that petty, meritless charges can get traction and turn the disciplinary process itself into a form of punishment long before a verdict has been reached."

== Alumni ==
Alumni include:

- Moshe Arens (1925–2019), aeronautical engineer; Israeli MK and defense minister
- Shaun Abreu (born 1991), member of the New York City Council
- Harry Belafonte (1927–2023), actor and singer
- David A. Boehm (1914–2000), publisher, founder of Sterling Publishing and publisher of the American version of the Guinness World Records
- Maria Callas (1923–1977), opera singer.
- Joseph Campanella (1924–2018), actor, younger brother of Frank Campanella
- Frank Campanella (1919–2006), actor, older brother of Joseph Campanella
- Rod Carew (born 1945), Major League Baseball Hall of Famer
- Kenneth Clark (1914–2005), psychologist and expert witness for the 1954 Brown v. Board of Education decision
- Gene Colan (1926–2011), Marvel and DC Comics artist, Comic Book Hall of Fame
- Alexander Dallin (1924 –2000), historian, political scientist, and international relations professor at Columbia University
- Persi Diaconis (born 1945), mathematician and former professional magician
- Gerald Dickler (1912–1999), lawyer who represented artists
- Jerry Finkelstein (1916– 2012), publisher and businessman
- Carl Gans (1923–2009), mechanical engineer, zoologist, herpetologist
- Alan Greenspan (1926–2026), economist, Chairman of the Board of Governors of the Federal Reserve
- Morris Halle (1923–2018), linguist
- Carlos Handy, physicist
- Murray Jarvik (1923–2008), UCLA pharmacologist; showed that nicotine was the addictive factor in tobacco; invented the nicotine patch for smokers trying to quit
- Jacob Javits (1904 –1986), U.S. Senator and U.S. Representative from New York, New York Attorney General; lawyer
- John George Kemeny (1926–1992), atomic scientist and computer science pioneer
- Don Kirshner (1934–2011), music publisher, music consultant, rock music producer, talent manager, and songwriter. Dubbed "the Man with the Golden Ear"
- Henry Kissinger (1923-2023), former United States Secretary of State, 1973 winner of the Nobel Peace Prize
- Cyril Kornbluth (1923-1958), science fiction author, member of the Futurians.
- Ron Perlman (born 1950), actor
- Manny Ramírez (born 1972), Major League baseball player (did not graduate)
- Helen Rodriguez Trias (1929-2001), ob-gyn & pediatrician, reproductive justice advocate, NYC Board of Health Director
- Nellie Rodríguez (born 1994), baseball player
- Delmore Schwartz (1913–1966), poet, author, and critic
- William "Bill" Shea (1907–1991), lawyer, instrumental in the founding of the New York Mets and New York Islanders, namesake of Shea Stadium
- Frank Skartados (1956–2018), New York state assemblyman
- Ronnie Spector (1943–2022), lead singer of The Ronettes
- Tiny Tim (1932–1996), musician
- Jerry Wexler (1917–2008), music journalist and producer
- Lester L. Wolff (1919–2021), member of Congress
- Anthony Osbourne, screenwriter and songwriter
