= David A. Boehm =

American publisher (1914–2000)

- Born: February 6, 1914; New York City, New York, U.S.
- Died: February 6, 2000 (aged 86); New York City, New York, U.S
- Education: Columbia University (BA)
- Occupation: Publisher
- Known for: Founding Sterling Publishing and publishing the Guinness World Records

David Alfred Boehm (February 6, 1914 – February 6, 2000) was an American publisher known for founding Sterling Publishing and popularizing the Guinness World Records in the United States.

== Biography ==
=== Early life and education ===
Boehm was born in Manhattan, attended George Washington High School and graduated from Columbia University in 1934, where he studied sociology and edited the Columbia Daily Spectator.

=== Career ===
After graduation, Boehm worked for a number of publishers including McGraw-Hill Book Company, Cupples & Leon. In 1949, Boehm founded Sterling Publishing in a telephone booth in the Hotel Pennsylvania. His first books were a series of how-to books on subjects such as stamp collecting and coin collecting.

In 1956, after discovering 30,000 copies of The Guinness Book of Superlatives on the shelves of a Boston warehouse, Boehm rushed to secure publishing rights from Arthur Guinness Son & Co. of the magazine in the United States in return for a percentage of the sales. He also renamed it The Guinness Book of World Records and added in baseball records to appeal to the American audience.

In 1961, Boehm secured rights to publish a separate American version of the Guinness World Records, with sales rising to two to three million copies a year during the 1970s. Boehm began to license merchandise spinoffs in the 1980s as the series gained popularity, resulting in a series of legal fights that led to Guinness's buying back the license for $8 million in 1989.

=== Personal life ===
He made regular appearances on the game show The Guinness Game as a judge of live attempts to break world records.

Boehm retired from the publisher in 1980 and died in his home on February 6, 2000, in New York City.
