= Prince McCoy =

American string band musician

Prince Albert McCoy (March 19, 1882 – February 4, 1968) was an American string band musician who played violin and had a pivotal but, until recently, unacknowledged role in the development of blues and popular music. No recordings by him exist.

== Life and career ==
Born in St. Joseph, Louisiana, McCoy moved to Greenville, Mississippi as a child. By the early 1900s, he led a band who performed regularly at dances and civic events in the Mississippi Delta. Around 1903, when W. C. Handy and his band were playing at a dance in Cleveland, Mississippi, he encountered McCoy, although in his autobiography, Father of the Blues, as published in 1941, Handy did not refer to McCoy by name.

Handy wrote that, at the request of the dancers, he gave up the stage to a group "led by a long-legged chocolate boy... consist[ing] of just three pieces, a battered guitar, a mandolin and a worn-out bass." He described their music as "one of those over-and-over strains that seem to have no very clear beginning and certainly no ending at all. The strumming attained a disturbing monotony, but on and on it went, a kind of stuff associated with cane rows and levee camps. Thump-thump-thump went their feet on the floor. Their eyes rolled. Their shoulders swayed. And through it all that little agonizing strain persisted." Though Handy considered the music to be "haunting", he initially doubted whether it would be widely popular, but changed his opinion when he noted:

"A rain of silver dollars began to fall around the outlandish, stomping feet. The dancers went wild... There before the boys lay more money than my nine musicians were being paid for the entire engagement. Then I saw the beauty of primitive music. They had the stuff the people wanted. It touched the spot. Their music wanted polishing, but it contained the essence. Folks would pay money for it..".

The occasion led Handy to change his "idea of what constitutes music", and to start developing his highly influential career in popularizing blues music. The identity of the musicians he saw was unknown until 2009, when research by Elliott Hurwitt for Handy’s Mississippi Blues Trail marker uncovered earlier manuscript drafts of his autobiography, in which he specifically named Prince McCoy as the "long-legged chocolate boy" who led the three-piece band – though Hurwitt himself has questioned the identification, noting that McCoy was leader of a respectable band rather than the "ragged" figure described by Handy.

Other manuscripts by Handy name McCoy as playing "I’m A Winding Ball And I Don’t Deny My Name", recorded and copyrighted some 35 years later by Jelly Roll Morton as "Winin' Boy Blues"; and a song which, according to Handy band member S. L. "Stack" Mangham, Handy later copyrighted as "The Memphis Blues". In 1909, the Vicksburg Herald reported that McCoy's band was "of Delta-wide fame", and local newspaper reports indicate that he led a band of up to eight musicians who played dances in and around Cleveland, Rosedale and Vicksburg through the 1910s and into the early 1920s. He also performed solo and duets on violin.

McCoy moved from Mississippi to Winston-Salem, North Carolina before 1927, and played in the Maxey Medicine Shows until at least 1937. He later worked in Winston-Salem as a laborer and janitor at the Bowman Gray School of Medicine. His earlier career as a musician was unknown at the time of his death in 1968, aged 85.

== Recognition ==
In 2017, a Mississippi Blues Trail marker to commemorate Prince McCoy was unveiled in Greenville.
