= Barton Seaver =

American chef (born 1979)

Barton Seaver (born April 12, 1979) is an author, speaker and chef. He works and resides in the state of Maine.

== Early years ==
Seaver grew up in Washington, D.C. and attended St. Albans School. He graduated with honors from The Culinary Institute of America in Hyde Park, New York, in 2001 and taught meat and fish classes on a fellowship post under the guidance of chef Corky Clark. He worked in restaurants in Chicago and New York, and then traveled abroad to southern Spain and Morocco, where he worked with local villagers on fishing boats and in small family-run hotel restaurants.

== Career ==
=== Culinary ===
In 2005, Seaver returned to Washington, D.C., and worked with chef José Andrés at the restaurant Jaleo. Seaver became executive chef of Café Saint-Ex and later its sister restaurant, Bar Pilar. He was chef-owner of the sustainable seafood restaurant Hook in Georgetown in 2007. Over the course of one year, Hook served 78 species of seafood. In addition, Seaver helped launch the casual seafood eatery Tackle Box. Seaver left Hook in 2008. He became chef of a new restaurant in the Glover Park neighborhood called Blue Ridge in 2009. His work at Blue Ridge led John Mariani of Esquire Magazine to name Seaver the 2009 Chef of the Year. The designation polarized restaurant critics. Seaver left Blue Ridge in early 2010 to work on other projects. His plans for a 6,700-square-foot (620 m^{2}) combination sustainable seafood market and restaurant in Logan Circle to be called Diamond District Seafood Company were put on hold indefinitely in 2010 due to problems with the location. In 2012, Seaver was named by Secretary of State Hillary Clinton to the United States Culinary Ambassador Corps.

=== Sustainability ===
Seaver shifted his focus away from the restaurant business and toward promoting sustainability, wellness, and community as they relate to food. He sat on the board of the hunger-fighting organization D.C. Central Kitchen until 2013 and was a fellow with the Blue Ocean Institute. He also has collaborations with the School Nutrition Association and Future of Fish. Seaver received a Seafood Champion Award from Seafood Choices Alliance in 2008. He is a member of the board of L.A. Kitchen.

=== University of New England ===
In 2016, Seaver was a Senior Advisor, Sustainable Seafood Innovations at the University of New England.

=== The Center for Health and the Global Environment ===
In 2015, Seaver served as the Director of the Sustainable Seafood and Health Initiative at the Center for Health and the Global Environment at the Harvard School of Public Health in Boston, Massachusetts.

=== New England Aquarium ===
In 2012, Seaver became the first Sustainability Fellow in Residence.

=== National Geographic ===
Seaver became a National Geographic fellow in 2010. He developed a list of ocean friendly substitutes for popular yet depleted seafood species, and co-created the Seafood Decision Guide for consumers which evaluates seafood based on health and environmental factors. He also hosts the National Geographic Web series Cook-Wise. and is a regular contributing guest on National Geographic Weekend with Boyd Matson.

=== Writing ===
Seaver has written opinion pieces for Seafood Business News, Treehugger, Stop Smiling magazine and StarChefs.com. He blogs for National Geographic's Ocean Views page. His first book, For Cod and Country: Simple, Delicious, Sustainable Cooking (Sterling Epicure, 2011) is a cookbook of seasonal, environmentally responsible seafood and vegetable recipes. His second book, Where There's Smoke: Simple, Delicious, Sustainable Grilling (Sterling Epicure, 2013) is a cookbook focused on grilling and entertaining. It was nominated by the International Association of Culinary Professionals in 2014 in the "Food Matters" category as a finalist in their prestigious annual cookbook awards. In 2014, he released Foods for Health and the National Geographic Kid's Cookbook, both published by National Geographic. In 2016, he published Two If By Sea with Sterling Epicure. His most recent book, American Seafood: Heritage, Culture & Cookery From Sea to Shining Sea is a seminal reference on every aspect of American seafood. Barton is a Contributing Seafood Editor at Coastal Living Magazine.

=== Speaking ===
In 2010, Seaver delivered a TED Talk on sustainable seafood aboard the National Geographic Endeavour as part of a conference-at-sea conceived by TED Prize winner and Mission Blue founder Dr. Sylvia Earle as part of the Mission Blue Voyage. On June 16, 2014, Seaver addressed the U.S. Department of State’s Our Ocean Conference in Washington, D.C., hosted by Secretary of State John Kerry. He also prepared the menu which featured underutilized species of fish from his home state of Maine.

=== Television ===
In addition to his web-series with National Geographic titled Cook-Wise, Seaver has also hosted and appeared on a number of other television programs. In April 2010, he was interviewed for Anderson Cooper 360 on the topic of seafood scarcity. He also hosted a 3-part television series on the Ovation Network titled In Search of Food in 2011. In 2013, he appeared on the PBS program Moveable Feast.

== Personal life ==
Seaver lives in Maine with his wife, Carrie, and their sons.

== Bibliography ==
- Seaver, Barton (2013). Where There's Smoke: Simple, Sustainable, Delicious Grilling. Sterling Epicure. ISBN 978-1-4027-9705-7.
- Jackson, C.J.; Seaver, Barton (2012). Fish: Recipes from the Sea. Phaidon Press. ISBN 978-07148-6387-0.
- Seaver, Barton (2011). For Cod and Country: Simple, Delicious, Sustainable Cooking. Sterling Epicure. ISBN 978-1-4027-7775-2.
- Seaver, Barton. "A New Seafood Substitution Guide". Blue Ocean Institute. Archived from the original on 2011-07-27.
- Seaver, Barton (August 2010). "Fearless Fish Grilling" (PDF). Cooking Light Magazine. Archived from the original (PDF) on 2011-09-05.
- Seaver, Barton (November 2008). "A Drop in the Ocean" (PDF). Stop Smiling Magazine. Archived from the original (PDF) on 2011-09-05.
- Seaver, Barton (January 24, 2008). "The Year Ahead with Barton Seaver". Treehugger.
- Seaver, Barton (December 2007). "The Future of Sustainable Fishing Begins with...a Shrimp". StarChefs.com.
- Seaver, Barton (March 2007). "A Field Trip to Polyface Farm". StarChefs.com.
- Seaver, Barton (February 2007). "Sustainable Seafood – What Can (and Should) We Do?". StarChefs.com.
- Seaver, Barton (January 2007). "Organic Foods, Sustainable Foods, and What Should We Promote". StarChefs.com.
