= W. C. Handy =

American blues composer and musician (1873–1958)

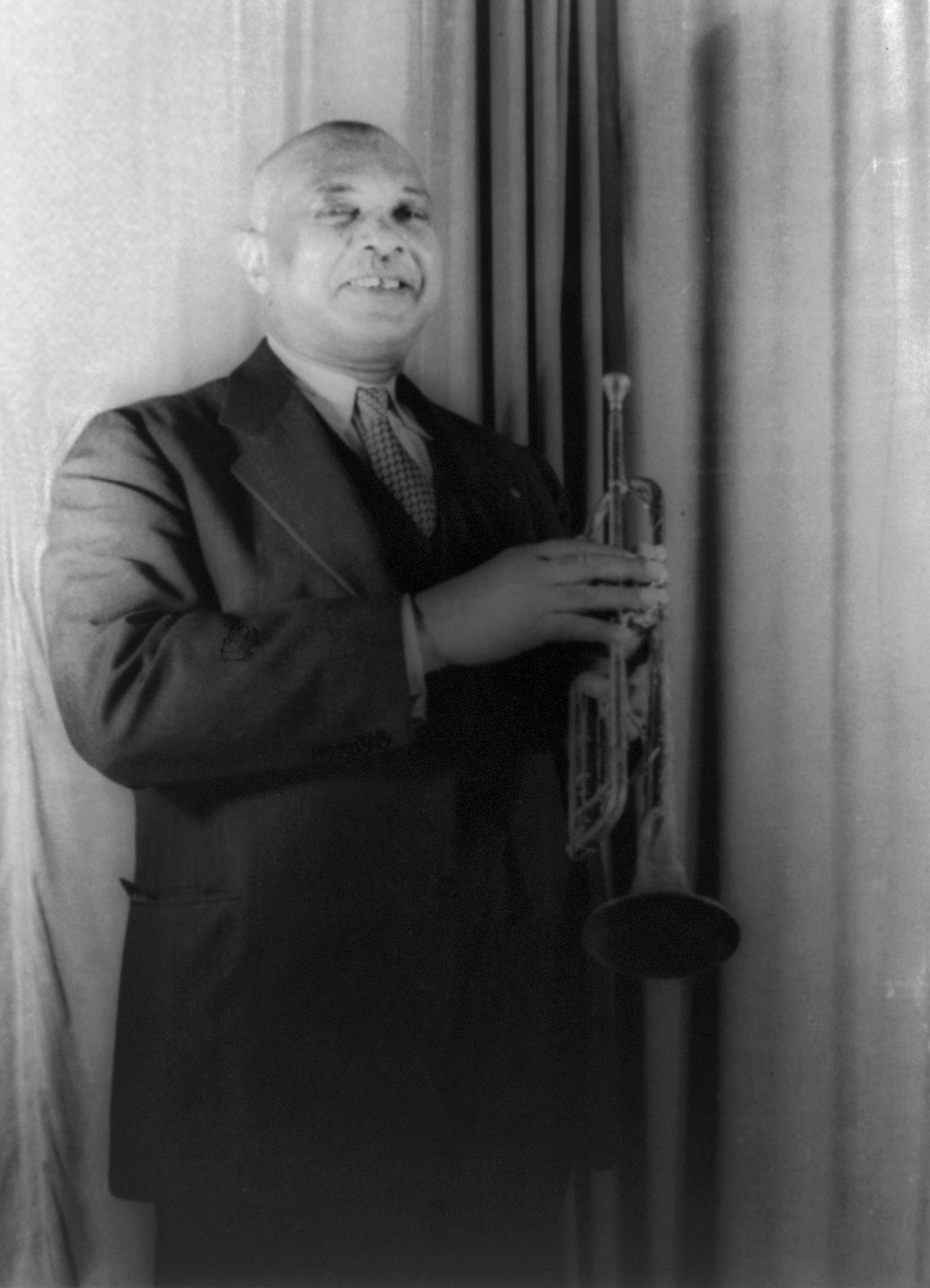
- Handy in 1941

Background information
- Also known as: Father of the Blues
- Born: William Christopher Handy; November 16, 1873; Florence, Alabama, U.S.
- Origin: Memphis, Tennessee, U.S.
- Died: March 28, 1958 (aged 84) New York City, U.S.
- Genres: Blues; jazz
- Occupations: Composer; musician; bandleader
- Instrument: Trumpet
- Years active: 1893–1948

William Christopher Handy (November 16, 1873 – March 28, 1958) was an American composer and musician who referred to himself as the Father of the Blues. He was one of the most influential songwriters in the United States. One of many musicians who played the distinctively American blues music, Handy did not create the blues genre but was one of the first to publish music in the blues form, thereby taking the blues from a regional music style (Delta blues) with a limited audience to a new level of popularity.

Handy used elements of folk music in his compositions. He was scrupulous in documenting the sources of his works, which frequently combined stylistic influences from various performers.

== Early life ==
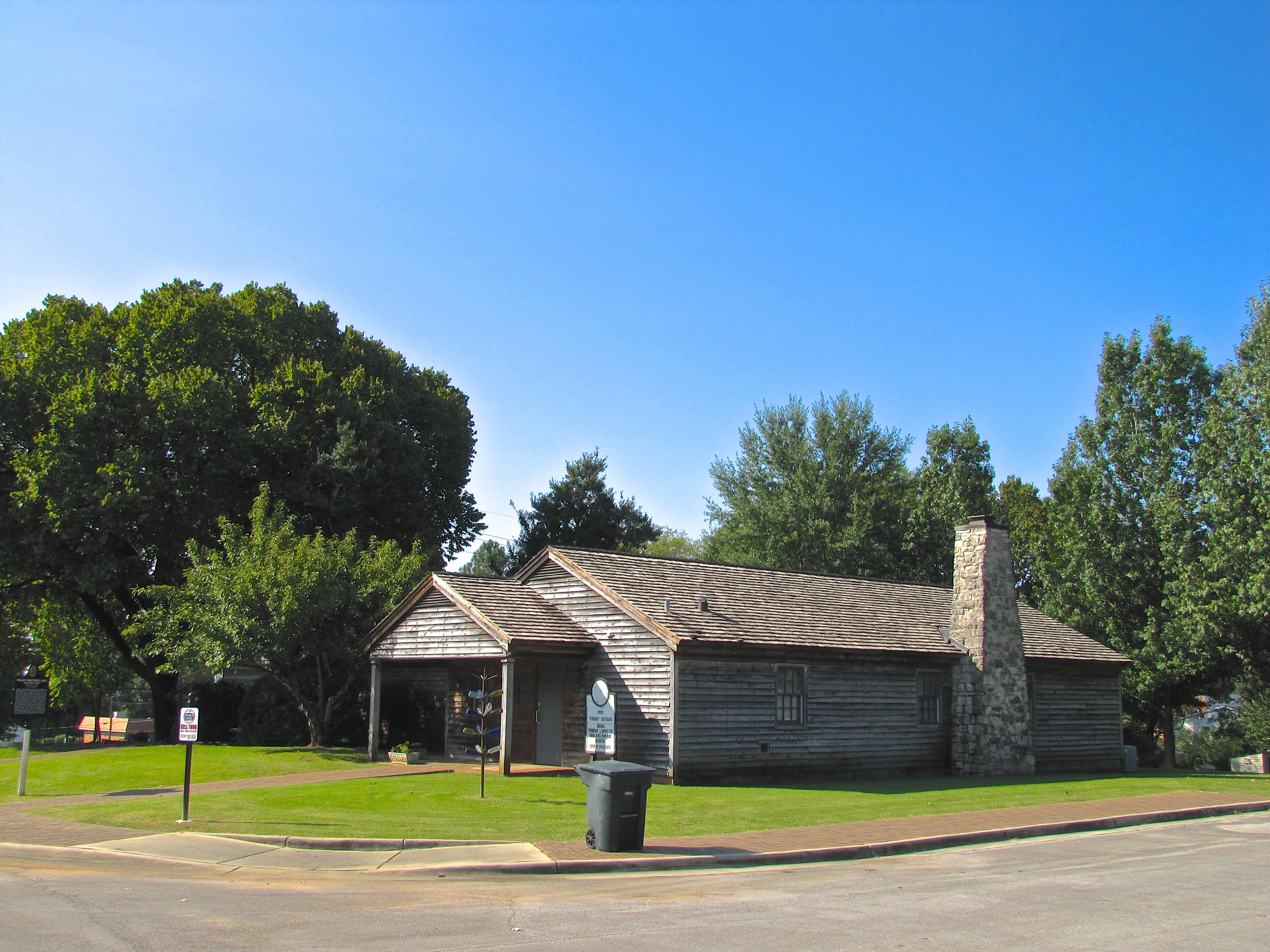
Handy's birthplace in Florence, Alabama

Handy was born on November 16, 1873, in Florence, Alabama, the son of Elizabeth Brewer and Charles Barnard Handy. His father was the pastor of a small church in Guntersville, a town in northern Alabama's Marshall County. Handy wrote in his 1941 autobiography Father of the Blues that he was born in a log cabin built by his grandfather William Wise Handy, who became an African Methodist Episcopal minister after the Emancipation Proclamation. The log cabin of Handy's birth has been preserved near downtown Florence.

Handy's father believed that musical instruments were tools of the devil. Without his parents' permission, Handy bought his first guitar, which he had seen in a local shop window and secretly saved for by picking berries and nuts and making lye soap. Upon seeing the guitar, his father asked him, "What possessed you to bring a sinful thing like that into our Christian home?" and ordered him to "take it back where it came from", but he also arranged for his son to take organ lessons. The organ lessons did not last long, and Handy moved on to learn to play the cornet. He joined a local band as a teenager, but he kept his involvement a secret from his parents. He purchased a cornet from a fellow band member and spent every free minute practicing it.

While growing up, he apprenticed in carpentry, shoemaking, and plastering. He was deeply religious. His musical style was influenced by the church music he sang and played in his youth and by the sounds of nature. He cited as inspiration the "whippoorwills, bats and hoot owls and their outlandish noises", Cypress Creek washing on the fringes of the woodland, and "the music of every songbird and all the symphonies of their unpremeditated art".

He worked on a "shovel brigade" at the McNabb furnace, where he learned to use his shovel to make music with the other workers to pass the time. The workers would beat their shovels against hard surfaces in complex rhythms that Handy said were "better to us than the music of a martial drum corps." Handy would later recall this improvisational spirit as being a formative experience for him, musically: "Southern Negroes sang about everything....They accompany themselves on anything from which they can extract a musical sound or rhythmical effect." He reflected, "In this way, and from these materials, they set the mood for what we now call Blues."

== Career ==
=== Early years ===
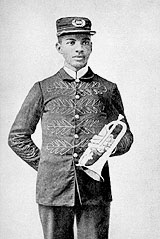
Handy at age 19

In September 1892, Handy traveled to Birmingham, Alabama, to take a teaching exam. He passed it easily and gained a teaching job at the Teachers Agriculture and Mechanical College for Negroes (now Alabama A&M University) in Normal, then an independent community near Huntsville. Learning that it paid poorly, he quit the position and found employment at a pipe works plant in nearby Bessemer.

In his time off from his job, he organized a small string orchestra and taught musicians how to read music. He later organized the Lauzetta Quartet. When the group read about the upcoming World's Fair in Chicago, they decided to attend. To pay their way, they performed odd jobs along the way. They arrived in Chicago and then learned that the World's Fair had been postponed for a year. Next they headed to St. Louis, Missouri, but found no work.

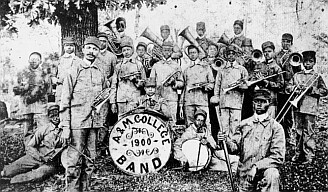
Handy, c. 1900, director of the Alabama Agriculture & Mechanical College Band

After the quartet disbanded, Handy went to Evansville, Indiana. He played the cornet in the Chicago World's Fair in 1893. In Evansville, he joined a successful band that performed throughout neighboring cities and states. His musical endeavors were varied: he sang first tenor in a minstrel show, worked as a band director, choral director, cornetist, and trumpeter. At the age of 23, he became the bandmaster of Mahara's Colored Minstrels.

In a three-year tour they traveled to Chicago, throughout Texas and Oklahoma to Tennessee, Georgia, and Florida, and on to Cuba, Mexico and Canada. Handy was paid a salary of $6 per week. Returning from Cuba the band traveled north through Alabama, where they stopped to perform in Huntsville.

In 1896, while performing at a barbecue in Henderson, Kentucky, Handy met Elizabeth Price. They married on July 19, 1896. She gave birth to Lucille, the first of their six children, on June 29, 1900. Weary of life on the road, he and Elizabeth stayed with relatives after they had settled in Florence.

Around that time, William Hooper Councill, the president of State Agricultural and Mechanical College in Huntsville, the same college Handy had refused to teach at in 1892 due to low pay, hired Handy to teach music. He became a faculty member in September 1900 and taught through much of 1902. He was disheartened to discover that the college emphasized teaching European "classical" music. He again felt he was underpaid and could make more money touring with a minstrel group.

=== Development of the blues style ===
In 1902, Handy traveled throughout Mississippi, listening to various styles of popular black music. The state was mostly rural and music was part of the culture, especially in cotton plantations in the Mississippi Delta. Musicians usually played guitar or banjo or, to a much lesser extent, piano. Handy's remarkable memory enabled him to recall and transcribe the music he heard in his travels.

After a dispute with AAMC President Councill, Handy resigned his teaching position to return to the Mahara Minstrels and tour the Midwest and Pacific Northwest. In 1903, he became the director of a black band organized by the Knights of Pythias in Clarksdale, Mississippi. Handy and his family lived there for six years. During this time, he had several formative experiences that he later recalled as influential in his developing musical style. In 1903, while waiting for a train in Tutwiler, Mississippi, in the Mississippi Delta, Handy overheard a black man playing a steel guitar using a knife as a slide.

About 1905, while playing a dance in Cleveland, Mississippi, Handy was given a note asking for "our native music". He played an old-time Southern melody but was asked if a local colored band could play a few numbers. Handy assented, and three young men with well-worn instruments began to play. Research by Elliott Hurwitt for the Mississippi Blues Trail identified the leader of the band in Cleveland as Prince McCoy. In his autobiography, Handy described the music they played:

They struck up one of those over and over strains that seem to have no beginning and certainly no ending at all. The strumming attained a disturbing monotony, but on and on it went, a kind of stuff associated with [sugar] cane rows and levee camps. Thump-thump-thump went their feet on the floor. It was not really annoying or unpleasant. Perhaps "haunting" is the better word.

Handy also took influence from the square dances held by Mississippi blacks, which typically had music in the G major key. In particular, he picked the same key for his 1914 hit, "Saint Louis Blues".

=== First hit: "The Memphis Blues" ===
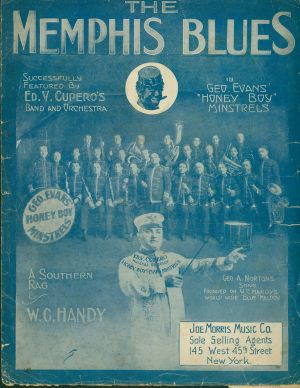
"The Memphis Blues" sheet music cover, 1913

In 1909 Handy and his band moved to Memphis, Tennessee, where they played in clubs on Beale Street. "The Memphis Blues" was a campaign song written for Edward Crump, the successful Democratic Memphis mayoral candidate in the 1909 election and political boss. The other candidates also employed Black musicians for their campaigns. Handy later rewrote the tune and changed its name from "Mr. Crump" to "Memphis Blues." The 1912 publication of the sheet music of "The Memphis Blues" introduced his style of 12-bar blues; it was credited as the inspiration for the foxtrot by Vernon and Irene Castle, a New York dance team. Handy sold the rights to the song for $100. By 1914, when he was 40, he had established his musical style, his popularity had greatly increased, and he was a prolific composer.

In his autobiography, Handy described how he incorporated elements of black folk music into his musical style. The basic three-chord harmonic structure of blues music and the use of flat third and seventh chords in songs played in the major key all originated in vernacular music created for and by impoverished southern blacks. Those notes are now referred to in jazz and blues as blue notes. His customary three-line lyrical structure came from a song he heard Phil Jones perform. Finding the structure too repetitive, he adapted it: "Consequently I adopted the style of making a statement, repeating the statement in the second line, and then telling in the third line why the statement was made." He also made sure to leave gaps in the lyrics for the singer to provide improvisational filler, which was common in folk blues.

Handy's first popular success, "Memphis Blues", recorded by Victor Military Band, July 15, 1914

Writing about the first time "Saint Louis Blues" was played, in 1914, Handy said,

The one-step and other dances had been done to the tempo of Memphis Blues. ... When St Louis Blues was written the tango was in vogue. I tricked the dancers by arranging a tango introduction, breaking abruptly into a low-down blues. My eyes swept the floor anxiously, then suddenly I saw lightning strike. The dancers seemed electrified. Something within them came suddenly to life. An instinct that wanted so much to live, to fling its arms to spread joy, took them by the heels.

His published musical works were groundbreaking because of his race. In 1912, he met Harry Pace at the Solvent Savings Bank in Memphis. Pace was the valedictorian of his graduating class at Atlanta University and a student of W. E. B. Du Bois. By the time of their meeting, Pace had demonstrated a strong understanding of business. He earned his reputation by saving failing businesses. Handy liked him, and Pace later became the manager of Pace and Handy Sheet Music.

In 1916, American composer William Grant Still, early in his career, worked in Memphis for W.C. Handy's band. In 1918, Still joined the United States Navy to serve in World War I. After the war, he went to Harlem, where he continued to work for Handy.

=== Move to New York ===
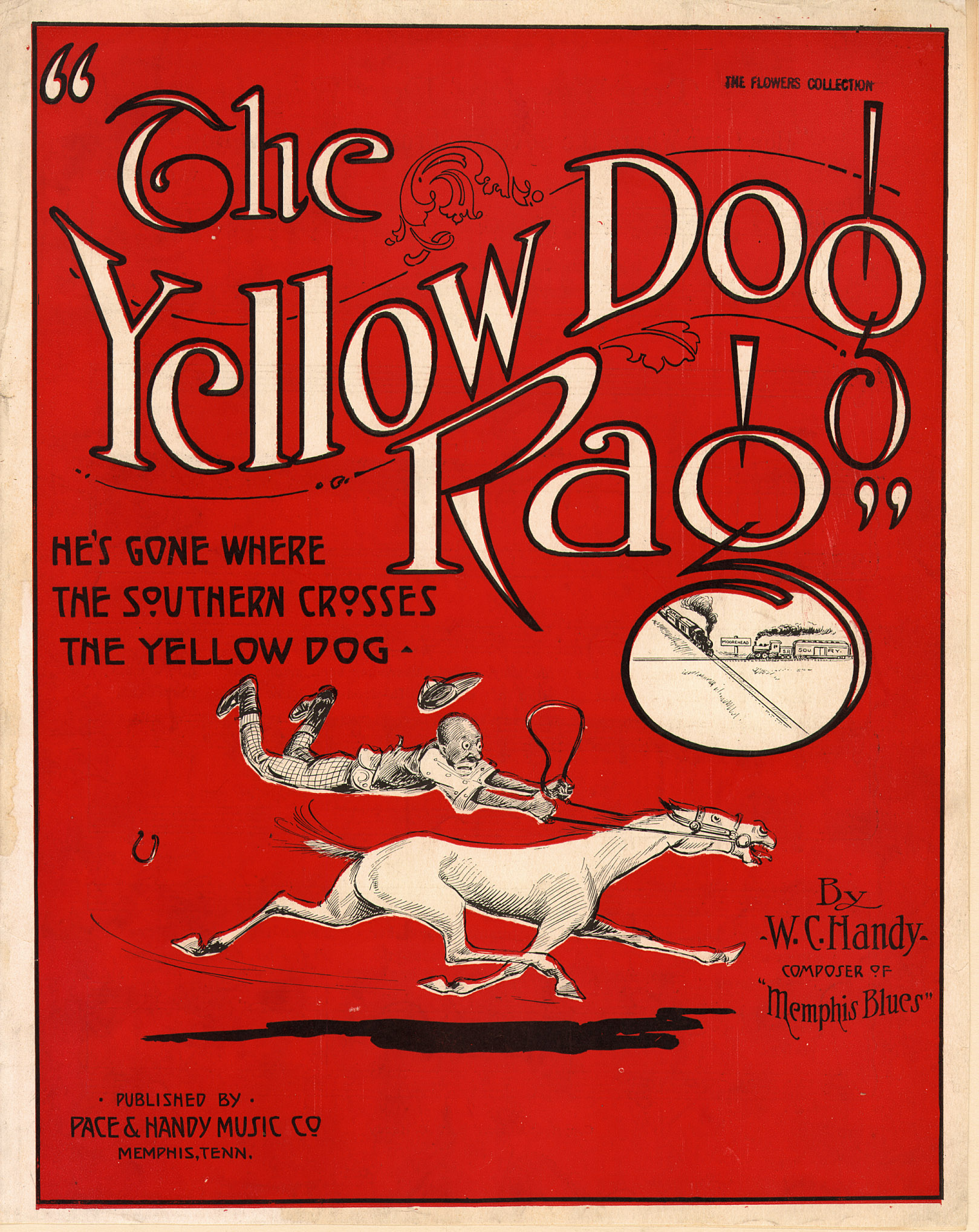
1914 sheet music cover of "Yellow Dog Rag"

In 1917, Handy and his publishing business moved to New York City, where he had offices in the Gaiety Theatre office building in Times Square. By the end of that year, his most successful songs had been published: "Memphis Blues", "Beale Street Blues", and "Saint Louis Blues". That year, the Original Dixieland Jazz Band, a white New Orleans jazz ensemble, had recorded the first jazz record, introducing the style to a wide segment of the American public. Handy had little fondness for jazz, but bands dove into his repertoire with enthusiasm, making many of these songs jazz standards.

Handy encouraged performers such as Al Bernard, a soft-spoken white man who nonetheless was a powerful blues singer. He sent Bernard to Thomas Edison to be recorded, which resulted in a series of successful recordings. Handy also published music written by other writers, such as Bernard's "Shake Rattle and Roll" and "Saxophone Blues", and "Pickaninny Rose" and "O Saroo", two black traditional tunes contributed by a pair of white women from Selma, Alabama. Publication of these hits, along with Handy's blues songs, gave his business a reputation as a publisher of black music.

In 1919, Handy signed a contract with Victor Talking Machine Company for a third recording of his unsuccessful 1915 song "Yellow Dog Blues". The resulting Joe Smith recording of the song was a strong seller, with orders numbering in the hundreds of thousands of copies.

Handy tried to interest black singers in his music but was unsuccessful; many musicians chose to play only the current hits, and did not want to take risks with new music. According to Handy, he had better luck with white bandleaders, who "were on the alert for novelties. They were therefore the ones most ready to introduce our numbers." Handy also had little success selling his songs to black women singers, but in 1920, Perry Bradford convinced Mamie Smith to record two non-blues songs ("That Thing Called Love" and "You Can't Keep a Good Man Down") that were published by Handy and accompanied by a white band. When Bradford's "Crazy Blues" became a hit as recorded by Smith, black blues singers became popular. Handy's business began to decrease because of the competition.

In 1920, Pace amicably dissolved his partnership with Handy, with whom he also collaborated as lyricist. Pace formed Pace Phonograph Company and Black Swan Records, and many of the employees went with him. Handy continued to operate the publishing company as a family-owned business. He published works of other black composers as well as his own, which included more than 150 sacred compositions and folk song arrangements and about 60 blues compositions. In the 1920s, he founded the Handy Record Company in New York City; while this label released no records, Handy organized recording sessions with it, and some of those recordings were eventually released on Paramount Records and Black Swan Records. So successful was "Saint Louis Blues" that, in 1929, he and director Dudley Murphy collaborated on a RCA motion picture of the same name, which was to be shown before the main attraction. Handy suggested blues singer Bessie Smith for the starring role because the song had made her popular. The movie was filmed in June and was shown in movie houses throughout the United States from 1929 to 1932.

The importance of Handy's work as a musician and musicologist crossed the boundaries of genre, coming to influence European composers such as Maurice Ravel, who was inspired during a stay in Paris of Handy and his orchestra for the composition of the famous sonata nr 2 for violin and piano known not by chance as the Blues sonata.

In 1926 Handy wrote Blues: An Anthology—Complete Words and Music of 53 Great Songs. It is an early attempt to record, analyze, and describe the blues as an integral part of the South and the history of the United States. To celebrate the publication of the book and to honor Handy, Small's Paradise in Harlem hosted a party, "Handy Night", on Tuesday October 5, which contained the best of jazz and blues selections provided by Adelaide Hall, Lottie Gee, Maude White, and Chic Collins.

=== Later career and death ===
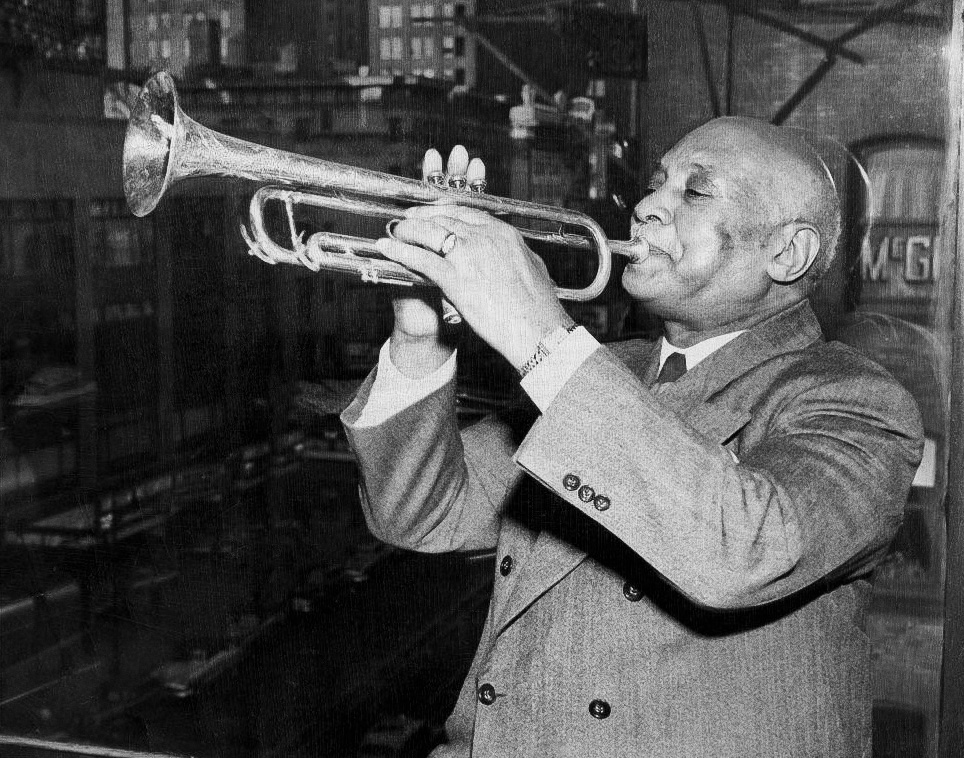
W. C. Handy in November 1949, playing trumpet in his music publishing office overlooking Times Square

In a 1938 radio episode of Ripley's Believe It or Not! Handy was described as "the father of jazz as well as the blues." Fellow blues performer Jelly Roll Morton wrote an open letter to Downbeat magazine fuming that he had invented jazz.

After the publication of his autobiography, Handy published a book on African-American musicians, titled Unsung Americans Sung (1944). He also wrote Blues: An Anthology: Complete Words and Music of 53 Great Songs, and Negro Authors and Composers of the United States. He lived on Strivers' Row in Harlem. He became blind after an accidental fall from a subway platform in 1943.

From 1943 until his death, he lived in Yonkers. His grandson is the physicist Carlos Handy (born 1950), who as of 2017 led the Handy Brothers Music Company. After the death of his first wife, he remarried in 1954 when he was 80. His bride was his secretary Irma Louise Logan, who he frequently said had become his eyes. In 1955, he had a stroke, and he began to use a wheelchair. More than 800 people attended his 84th birthday party at the Waldorf-Astoria Hotel.

On March 28, 1958, Handy died of bronchial pneumonia at Sydenham Hospital in New York City. Over 25,000 people attended his funeral in Harlem's Abyssinian Baptist Church. Over 150,000 people gathered in the streets near the church to pay their respects. He was buried in Woodlawn Cemetery in the Bronx.

== Compositions ==
Handy's music does not always follow the classic 12-bar pattern, often having 8- or 16-bar bridges between 12-bar verses.

- "Memphis Blues", written 1909, published 1912. Although usually subtitled "Boss Crump", it is a distinct song from Handy's campaign satire, "Boss Crump don't 'low no easy riders around here", which was based on the good-time song "Mamma Don't Allow It."
- "Yellow Dog Blues" (1912), "Your easy rider's gone where the Southern cross the Yellow Dog." The reference is to the crossing at Moorhead, Mississippi, of the Southern Railway and the local Yazoo and Mississippi Valley Railroad, called the Yellow Dog. By Handy's telling locals assigned the words "Yellow Dog" to the letters Y.D. (for Yazoo Delta) on the freight trains that they saw.
- "Saint Louis Blues" (1914), "the jazzman's Hamlet."
- "Loveless Love", based in part on the classic "Careless Love". Possibly the first song to complain of modern synthetics, "with milkless milk and silkless silk, we're growing used to soulless soul."
- "Aunt Hagar's Blues", the biblical Hagar, handmaiden to Abraham and Sarah, was considered the "mother" of African Americans
- "Beale Street Blues" (1916), written as a farewell to Beale Street of Memphis, which was named Beale Avenue until the song's popularity caused it to be changed
- "Long Gone John (from Bowling Green)", about a famous bank robber
- "Chantez-Les-Bas (Sing 'Em Low)", a tribute to the Creole culture of New Orleans
- "Atlanta Blues", which includes the song "Make Me a Pallet on your Floor" as its chorus.
- "Ole Miss Rag" (1917), a ragtime composition, recorded by Handy's Orchestra of Memphis

== Awards and honors ==
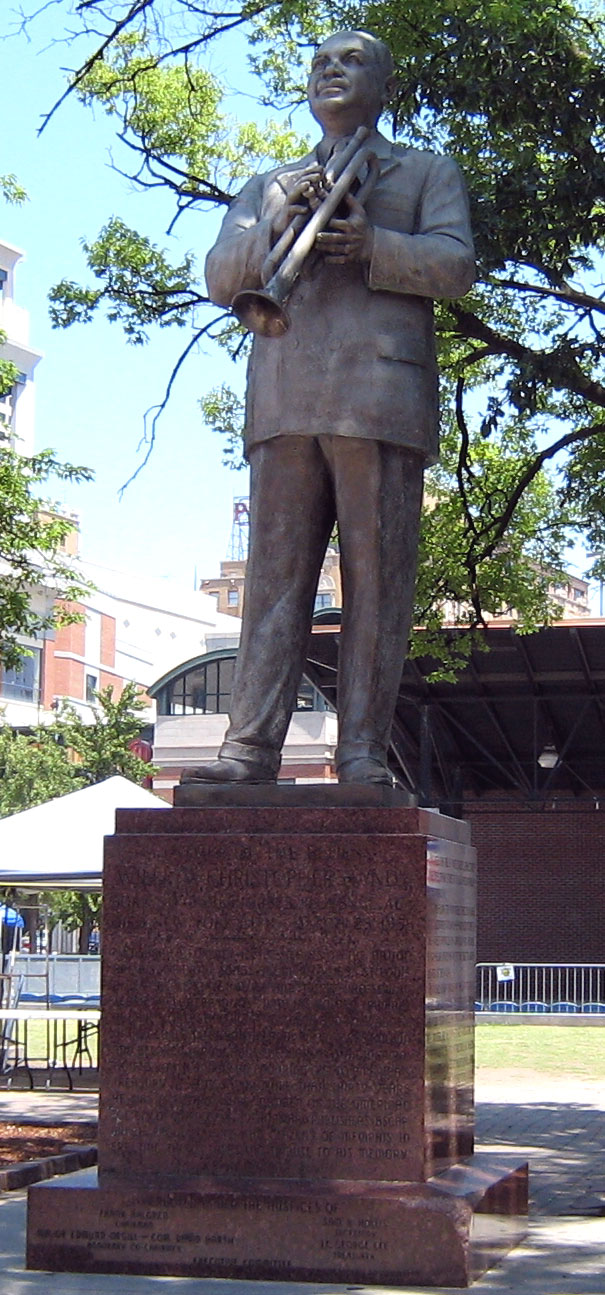
Bronze statue of Handy in Handy Park, Beale Street, Memphis, Tennessee

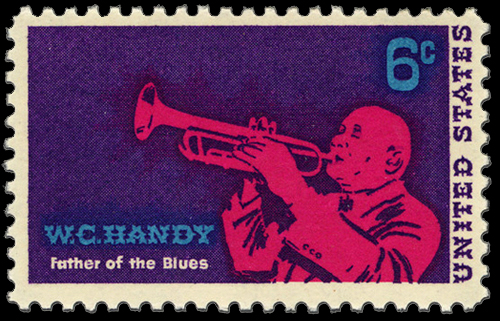
US stamp honoring W.C. Handy, "Father of the Blues", 1969

- In 1931, Handy Park, public park with a stage for live musical performances, was opened by the City of Memphis at 200 Beale Street. The statue in the park honoring him was erected in 1960.
- In 1947, the W.C. Handy Theatre was opened in Memphis. The building was demolished in 2012.
- The mayor of Yonkers, New York, designated December 8-14, 1957, as W.C. Handy Week.
- Handy was the subject of St. Louis Blues (1958), a heavily fictionalized biographical film starring Nat King Cole with Eartha Kitt and Ruby Dee.
- After Handy's death in 1958, the Domino Lounge in Memphis was renamed Club Handy.
- W.C. Handy Place in New York City is the honorary name for 52nd Street between Avenue of the Americas and Seventh Avenue.
- On May 17, 1969, the United States Postal Service issued a commemorative stamp in his honor.
- Handy was inducted in the National Academy of Popular Music Songwriters Hall of Fame in 1970.
- He was inducted into the Nashville Songwriters Hall of Fame in 1983.
- He was inducted into the Alabama Jazz Hall of Fame in 1985, and was a 1993 inductee into the Alabama Music Hall of Fame, with the Lifework Award for Performing Achievement.
- He received a Grammy Trustees Award for lifetime achievement in 1993.
- Citing 2003 as "the centennial anniversary of when W.C. Handy composed the first blues music" the United States Senate in 2002 passed a resolution declaring the year beginning February 1, 2003, as the "Year of the Blues".
- Handy was honored with two markers on the Mississippi Blues Trail, the "Enlightenment of W.C. Handy" in Clarksdale, Mississippi and a marker at his birthplace in Florence, Alabama.
- Blues Music Award was known as the W. C. Handy Award until the name change in 2006.
- W. C. Handy Music Festival is held annually in Florence, Alabama.
- Another W.C. Handy Music Festival is held annually in Henderson, Kentucky, in June.
- In 2017, his autobiography Father of the Blues was inducted in to the Blues Hall of Fame in the category of Classics of Blues Literature.

== Discography ==
=== Handy's Orchestra of Memphis ===
- The Old Town Pump/Sweet Child Introducing Pallet on the Floor (Columbia #2417) (1917)
- A Bunch of Blues/Moonlight Blues (Columbia #2418) (1917)
- Livery Stable Blues/That Jazz Dance Everyone Is Crazy About (Columbia #2419) (1917)
- The Hooking Cow Blues/Ole Miss Rag (Columbia #2420) (1917)
- The Snaky Blues/Fuzzy Wuzzy Rag (Columbia #2421) (1917)
- Preparedness Blues (Columbia) (unreleased) (recorded September 21, 1917)
- The Coburn Blues (Columbia) (unreleased) (recorded September 24, 1917)
- Those Draftin' Blues (Columbia) (unreleased) (recorded September 24, 1917)
- The Storybook Ball (Columbia) (unreleased) (recorded September 25, 1917)
- Sweet Cookie Mine (Columbia) (unreleased) (recorded September 25, 1917)

=== Handy's Memphis Blues Band ===
- Beale Street Blues/Joe Turner Blues (Lyric #4211) (9/1919) (never released)
- Hesitating Blues/Yellow Dog Blues (Lyric #4212) (9/1919) (never released)
- Early Every Morn/Loveless Love (Paramount #12011) (1922)
- St. Louis Blues/Yellow Dog Blues (Paramount #20098) (1922)
- St. Louis Blues/Beale Street Blues (Banner #1036) (1922)
- She's No Mean Job/Muscle Shoals Blues (Banner #1053) (1922)
- She's a Mean Job/Muscle Shoals Blues (Puritan #11112) (1922)
- Muscle Shoals Blues/She's a Mean Job (Regal #9313) (1922)
- St. Louis Blues/Yellow Dog Blues (Black Swan #2053) (1922)
- Muscle Shoals Blues/She's a Mean Job (Black Swan #2054) (1922)

=== Handy's Orchestra ===
- Yellow Dog Blues/St. Louis Blues (Puritan #11098) (1922)
- Louisville Blues/Aunt Hagar's Blues (Okeh #8046) (1923)
- Panama/Down Hearted Blues (Okeh #8059) (1923)
- Mama's Got the Blues/My Pillow and Me (Okeh #8066) (1923)
- Gulf Coast Blues/Farewell Blues (Okeh #4880) (1923)
- Sundown Blues/Florida Blues (Okeh #4886) (1923)
- Darktown Reveille/Ole Miss Blues (Okeh #8110) (1923)
- I Walked All the Way From East St. Louis (Library of Congress) (1938)
- Your Clothes Look Lonesome Hanging on the Line (Library of Congress) (1938)
- Got No More Home Than a Dog (Library of Congress) (1938)
- Joe Turner (Library of Congress) (1938)
- Careless Love (Library of Congress) (1938)
- Getting' Up Holler (Library of Congress) (1938)
- Oh De Kate's Up De River, Stackerlee's in de Ben (Library of Congress) (1938)
- Roll On, Buddy (Library of Congress) (1938)
- Olius Brown (Library of Congress) (1938)
- Sounding the Lead on the Ohio River (Library of Congress) (1938)

=== Handy's Sacred Singers ===
- Aframerican Hymn/Let's Cheer the Weary Traveler (Paramount #12719) (1929)

=== W. C. Handy's Orchestra ===
- Loveless Love/Way Down South Where the Blues Begin (Varsity #8162) (1939)
- St. Louis Blues/Beale Street Blues (Varsity #8163) (1939)

== See also ==
- List of people from Harlem
