= Carlos Handy =

Cuban-American physicist

Carlos Rafael Handy
- Born: 18 October 1950 (age 76); Havana, Cuba
- Education: Columbia University
- Scientific career
- Workplaces: Clark Atlanta University; Texas Southern University
- Thesis: The Diagrammatics of gauge transformations for general gauge theories (1978)

Carlos Rafael Handy (born 18 October 1950) is a Cuban-American physicist. He is a professor of physics at Texas Southern University, where he helped establish the university's physics program and served as its first chair. He also co-founded the Center for Theoretical Studies of Physical Systems at Clark Atlanta University. While at Clark Atlanta, he developed the Eigenvalue Method (EMM) technique.

== Early life and family ==
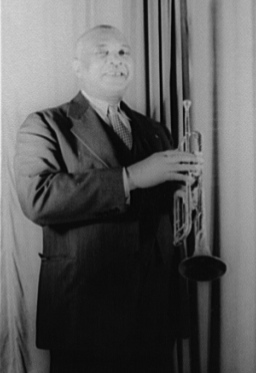
Carlos Handy's paternal grandfather, W.C. Handy, known as the "Father of the Blues"

Carlos Handy was born in Havana, Cuba, on 18 October 1950. His mother was Afro-Cuban and his father was African American. His mother, Leonor Maria Cartaya was born in 1916 in Matanzas, Cuba. She received a doctorate in education and worked as a teacher. In 1947, she moved to Washington, D.C., in the United States. Handy's father, William Christopher Handy, Jr., was born in 1904 in Clarksdale, Mississippi. His father, and Carlos Handy's paternal grandfather, was W.C. Handy, widely recognized as the "Father of the Blues." He also has a twin sister. Handy's parents met in New York City and married in the 1940s.

== Education ==
Handy was raised between in New York City and Cuba, and attended schools in Cuba for the first eight years of his life. He later attended Public School 165, Booker T. Washington Junior High School, and George Washington High School in Manhattan where he was a top math student. He went on to attend Columbia University beginning in 1968, and graduated with a bachelor's in physics and a minor in mathematics in 1972. Handy completed his doctoral education at Columbia University, and earned a master's degree in physics in 1975, and a PhD degree in theoretical physics in 1978. His doctoral thesis at Columbia was titled "The Diagrammatics of gauge transformations for general gauage theories." Handy was also the inaugural participant to graduate from AT&T’s Cooperative Research Fellowship Program, an initiative that has supported numerous women and minority scholars in earning Ph.D. degrees across a wide range of academic fields. While at Columbia, he also worked at IBM’s Thomas J. Watson Research Center, collaborating with Martin Gutzwiller, and was also one of the first recipients of the Bell Labs Cooperative Research Fellowship in 1972. He also studied with A. Mueller and John Klauder.

== Career ==
Following graduation, Handy was hired as a postdoctoral research associate as Los Alamos National Laboratory, where he worked from 1978 to 1981 on the moment problem in mathematics. In 1983, he was hired as an associate professor of physics at Clark Atlanta University. With funding from the National Science Foundation, while at Clark Atlanta, he helped establish the Center for Theoretical Studies of Physical Systems, of which he served as co-director. He remained on the faculty of Clark Atlanta from 1983 to 2005.

In 2005, Handy left Clark Atlanta to become the first chair of the physics program at Texas Southern University. He served as its chairman until 2016.

He has served in various professional societies and leadership positions, including on the Committee on Minorities of the American Physical Society and the National Society of Black Physicists. He has also held visiting appointments at CEA Paris-Saclay, Oak Ridge National Laboratory, and the University of Waterloo.

Handy is also president and CEO of the Handy Brothers Music Company, which aims to preserve to legacy of W.C. Handy's life and work.

== Personal life ==
Handy met his wife in New Mexico while working at the Los Alamos National Laboratory, and they married in 1981.
