= Paterson Crescents =

Defunct American basketball team based in Paterson, New Jersey

The Paterson Whirlwinds were an American basketball team based in Paterson, New Jersey that was a member of the American Basketball League.

After their first season, the team became known as the Paterson Crescents. During the 1st half of the 1930–31 season, on December 30, 1930, the team dropped out of the league. Owners were Jess Weiner and Jack Summer, both of Paterson, New Jersey. Lou Costello was a player. Mr. Summer once met with Ed Sullivan, then a sportswriter, for advice on how to promote the team.

== Year-by-year ==
Year	League	Reg. season	Playoffs
1928/29	ABL	8th (1st half); 8th (2nd half)	Did not qualify
1929/30	ABL	6th (1st half); 6th (2nd half)	Did not qualify
1930/31	ABL	6th (1st half)	Did not qualify

The Paterson Crescents were an American basketball team based in Paterson, New Jersey that was a member of the American Basketball League.

The team was previously known as the Washington Capitols.

=== Year-by-year ===
Year	League	Reg. season	Playoffs
1944/45	ABL	6th	Did not qualify
1945/46	ABL	6th	Did not qualify
1946/47	ABL	4th, Northern	Did not qualify
1947/48	ABL	2nd	Finals
1948/49	ABL	4th	Playoffs
1949/50	ABL	5th	Did not qualify
1950/51	ABL	3rd	No playoff
