= Edward V. Cupero =

Edward Victor Cupero (February 16, 1877 – September 10, 1939) was an Italian American composer, arranger, and cornetist best known for his screamer Honey Boys on Parade which he composed for the traveling band of George "Honey Boy" Evans.

== Biography ==
Born in Alife, Provincia di Caserta, Campania, Italy as Bonaventura Cupero on February 16, 1877, he immigrated to the United States with his father in 1891 and later changed his name to Edward Victor Cupero. He returned to Italy to study at the Royal Conservatory in Naples. He directed several minstrel shows in the United States, organized two bands in Baltimore, and later led a theater orchestra. He died in Baltimore on September 10, 1939, and was buried in Western Cemetery.
