= Sterling Publishing =

Book publisher

- Parent company: Hachette Book Group
- Status: Rebranded as Union Square & Co. in 2022
- Founded: 1949
- Founder: David Alfred Boehm
- Country of origin: United States
- Headquarters location: New York City
- Publication types: Books
- No. of employees: 280
- Official website: unionsquareandco.com

Sterling Publishing Company, Inc. is a publisher of a broad range of subject areas, with multiple imprints and more than 5,000 titles in print. Founded in 1949 by David A. Boehm, Sterling also publishes books for a number of brands, including AARP, Hasbro, Hearst Magazines, and USA TODAY, as well as serves as the North American distributor for domestic and international publishers including: Anova, the Brooklyn Botanic Garden, Carlton Books, Duncan Baird, Guild of Master Craftsmen, the Orion Publishing Group, and Sixth & Spring Books.

Sterling Publishing became a wholly owned subsidiary of Barnes & Noble, when the book retailer acquired it in 2003. On January 5, 2012, The Wall Street Journal reported that Barnes & Noble had put its Sterling Publishing business up for sale. Negotiations failed to produce a buyer, however, and as of March 2012 Sterling was reportedly no longer for sale.

In January 2022, Sterling rebranded as Union Square & Co. In March 2022, the company acquired the British children's publisher Boxer Books, one of its distribution clients. In 2024, Barnes & Noble sold Sterling to Hachette Book Group.

== Notable authors ==
Sterling's authors include Colleen Houck, Paul McKenna, Richard Scarry, Barton Seaver, Peter Yarrow, Cheryl Fall, and Kevin Zraly.
