= Frank Mangiapane =

American basketball player (1925–2005)

Personal information
- Born: August 5, 1925 New York City, New York
- Died: July 31, 2005 (aged 79) Long Beach, New York
- Listed height: 5 ft 10 in (1.78 m)
- Listed weight: 195 lb (88 kg)

Career information
- High school: George Washington (New York City, New York)
- College: NYU (1943–1947)
- Position: Guard
- Number: 5

Career history
- 1947: New York Knicks
- 1947–1949: Paterson Crescents
- 1949–1950: Hartford Hurricanes
- Stats at NBA.com
- Stats at Basketball Reference

Francis E. Mangiapane (August 5, 1925 – July 31, 2005) was an American professional basketball player. He played for the New York Knicks in the second half of the 1946–47 BAA season.

== BAA career statistics ==
Legend
GP	Games played
FG%	Field-goal percentage
FT%	Free-throw percentage
APG	Assists per game
PPG	Points per game

=== Regular season ===
Year	Team	GP	FG%	FT%	APG	PPG
1946–47	New York	6	.154	.333	.0	.8
Career		6	.154	.333	.0	.8
