= Paterson Armory =

Armory and arena in New Jersey, United States

Coordinates: 40.9131°N 74.1590°W

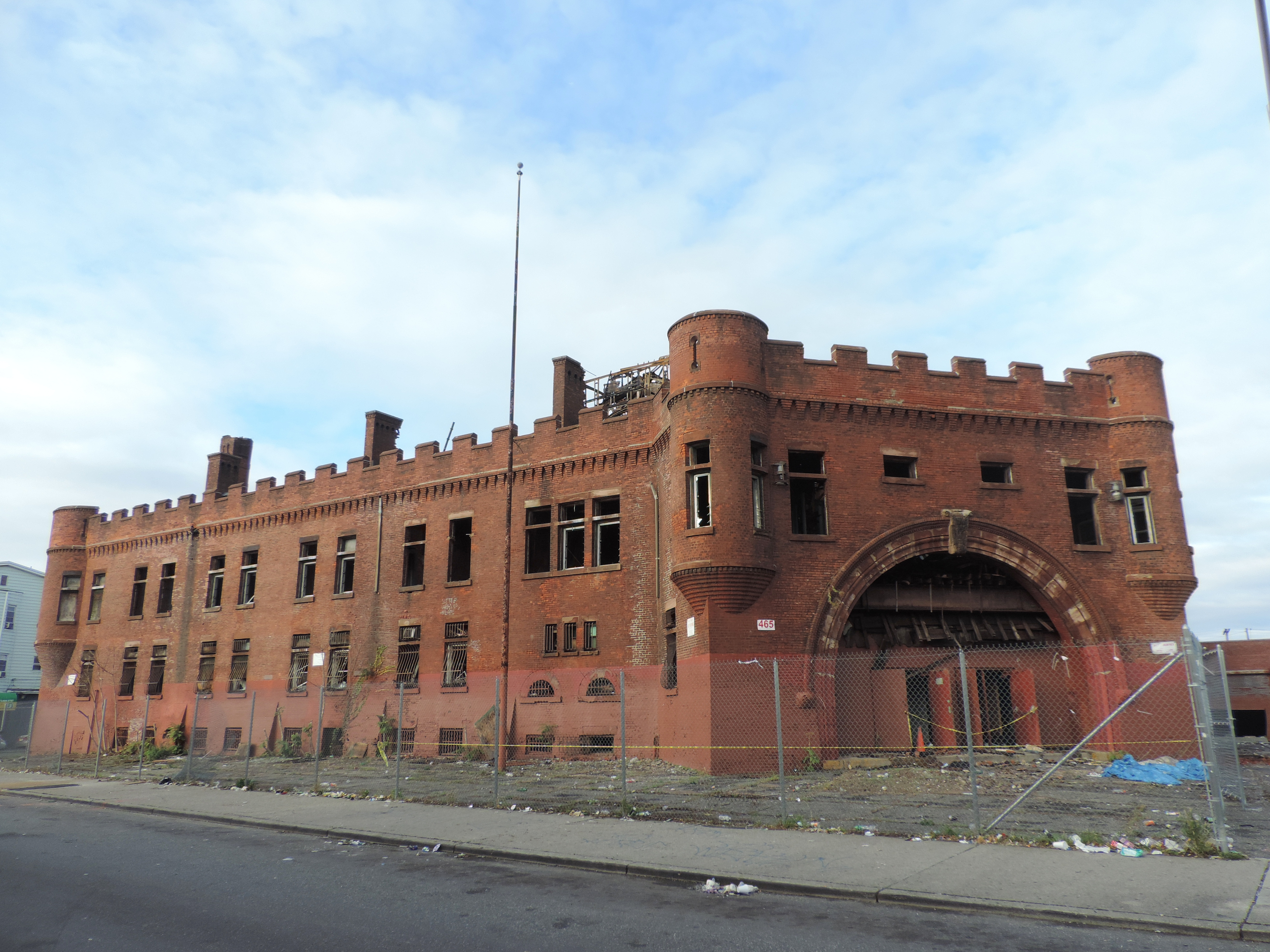
Exterior walls were little damaged by fire

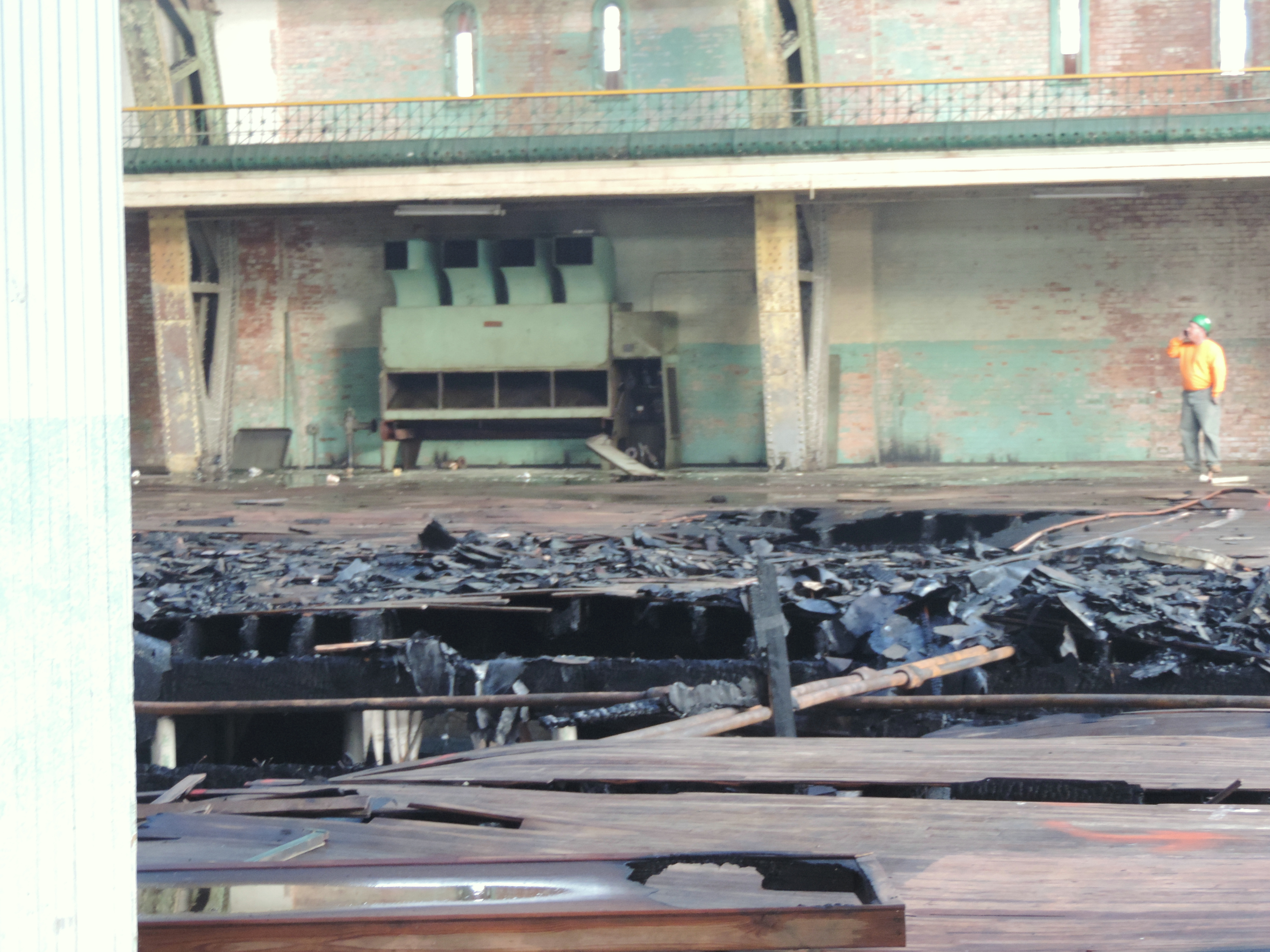
Fire burned through drill floor

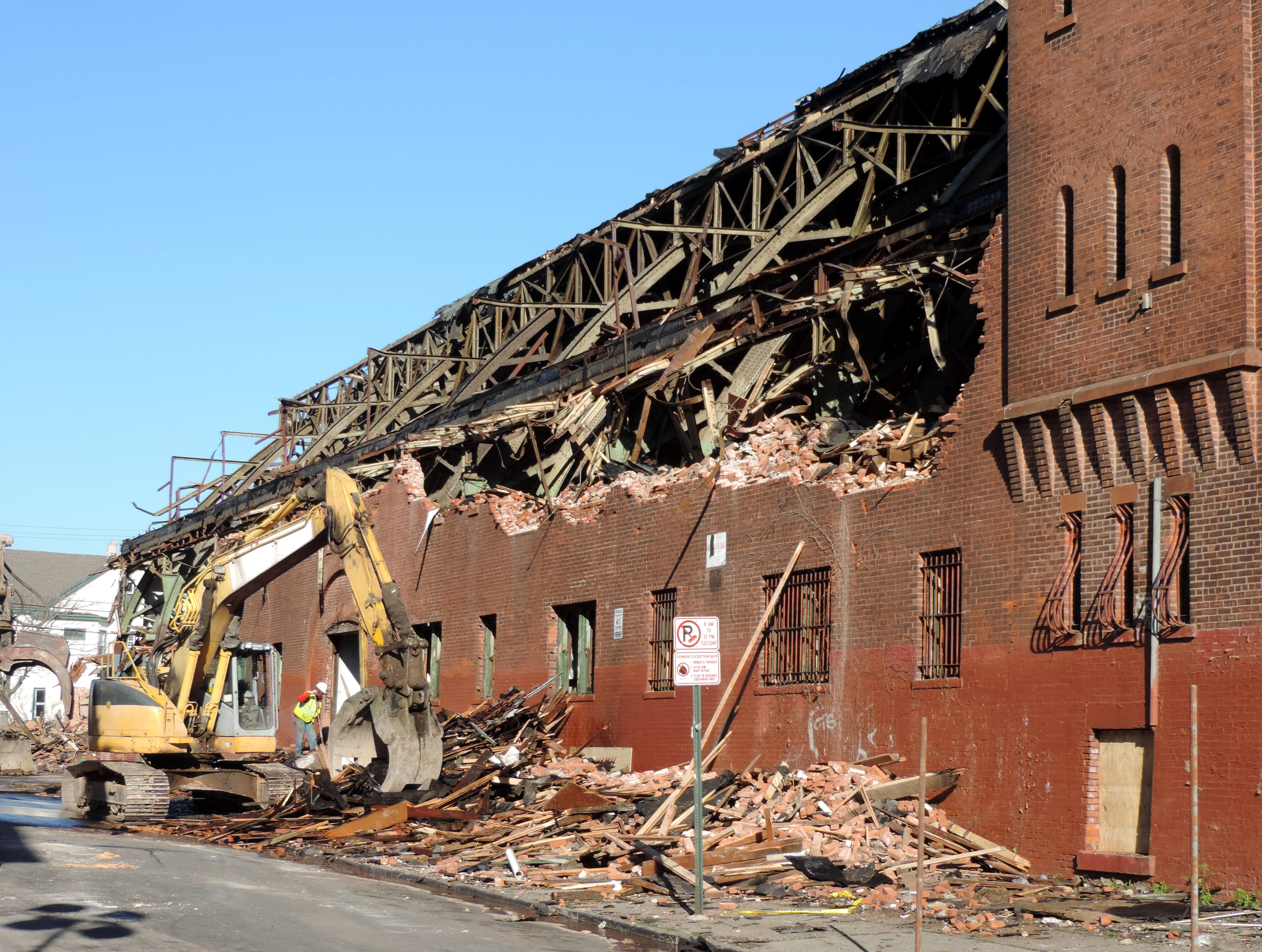
Demolition in progress

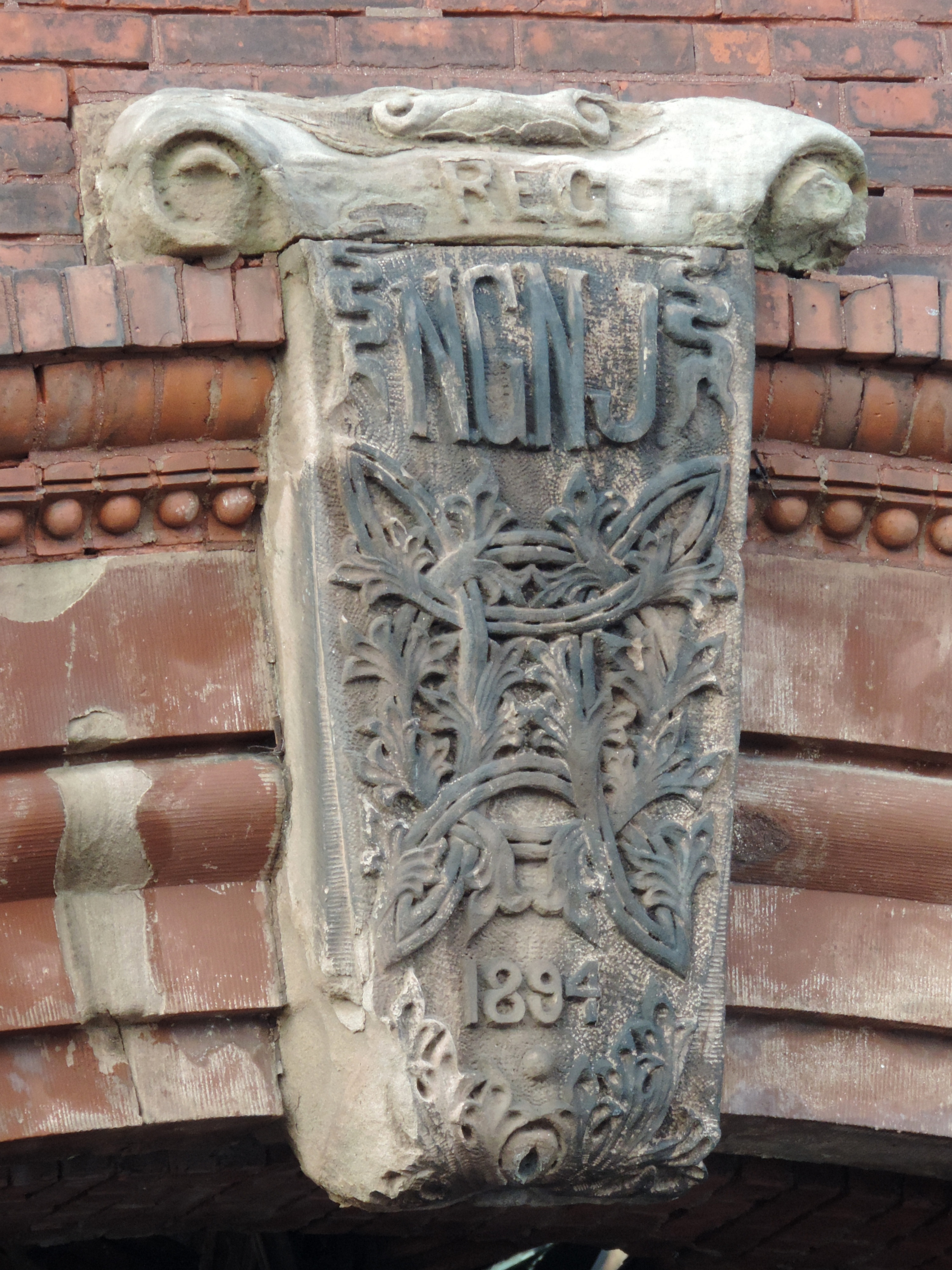
Keystone

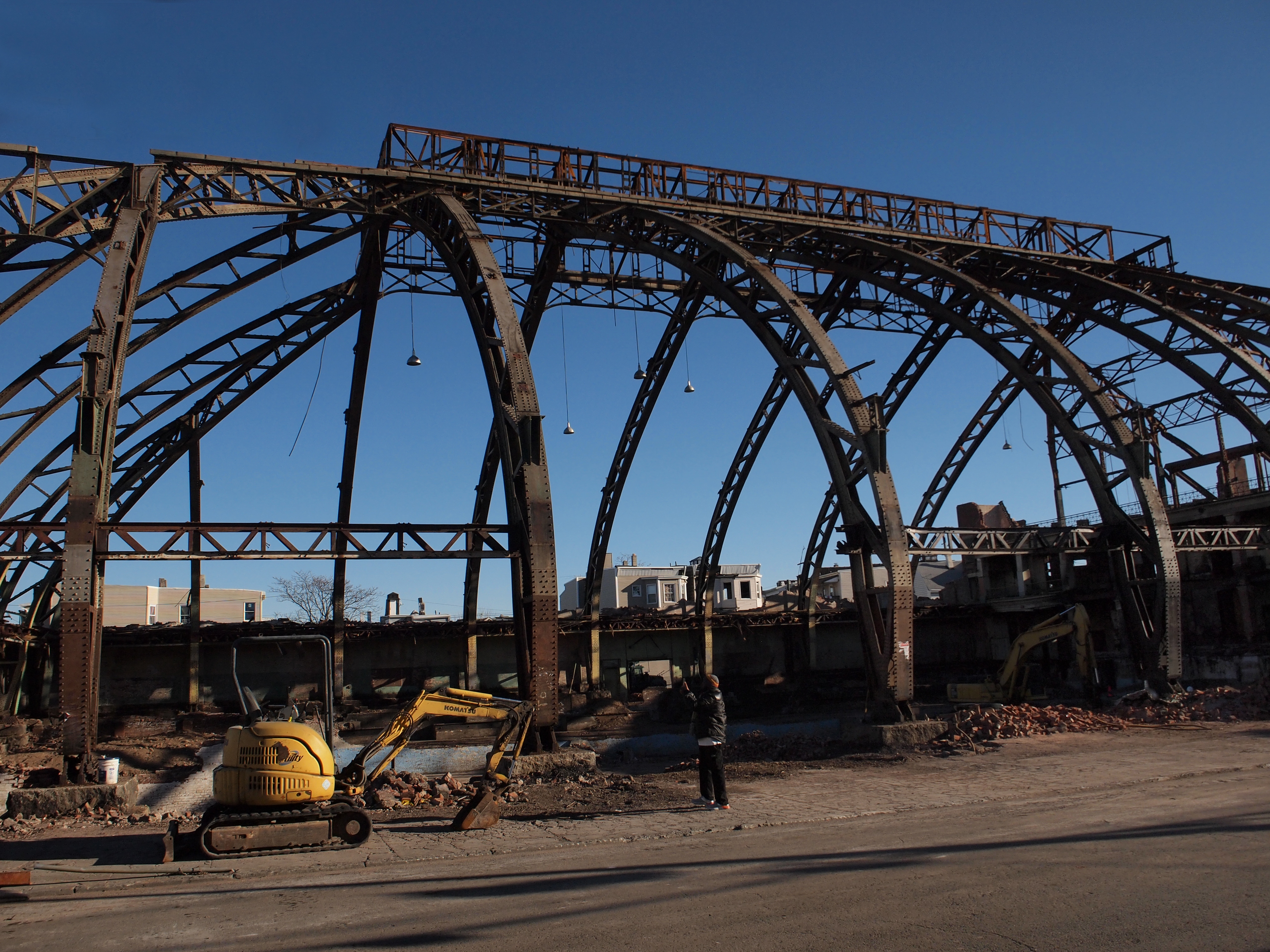
Strong, elegant arched "bones"

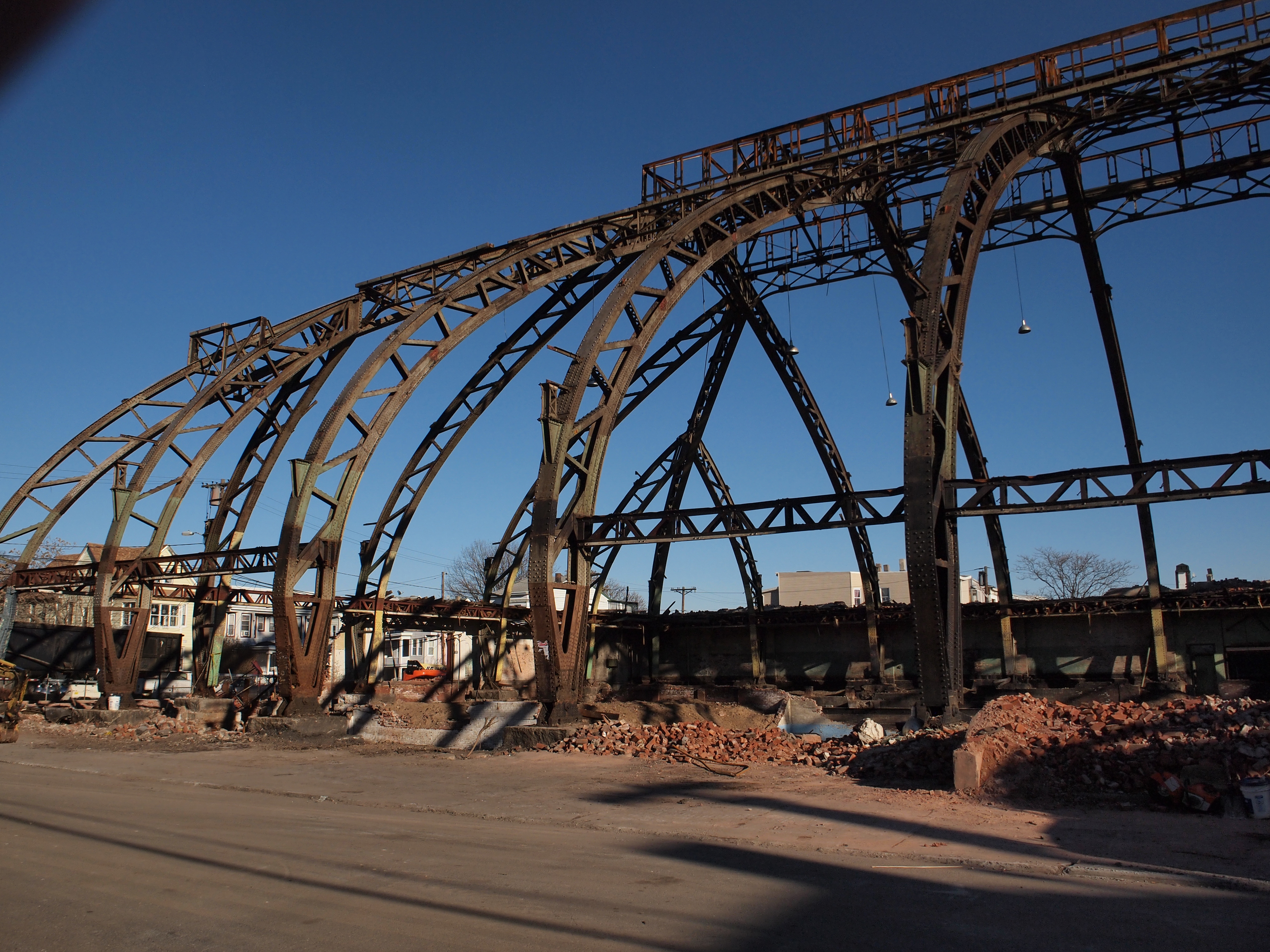
Curved wall and roof frame members of drill floor. Note base of columns is set on a roller pin (to accommodate movement of frame caused by temperature changes?)

The Paterson Armory, an armory in Paterson, New Jersey, was a facility of the New Jersey National Guard and an arena. The building at 461-473 Market Street was long disused and in a state of disrepair when on November 10, 2015, a fire damaged it heavily. As of November 16, 2015, the armory was in the process of being demolished. Certain decorative features, such as the keystone in the arch at the entrance, may be chiseled out and given to the Paterson Museum.

In January 2017, in the absence of proposals, the city relaxed regulations regarding the building site. to encourage re-use and redevelopment for commercial and residential uses. In July 2018, the city announced the potential sale of the armory for new construction including remaining historical elements of the building.

== Architecture and history ==
Paterson was the first place in the state to apply for the construction of an armory under a law passed in 1889, and is built on ground which was originally 12 city lots and transferred to the state by Passaic County. The laying of the cornerstone of the Paterson National Guard Armory took place on Memorial Day in 1894, built for the state's Second Regiment. Completed in 1896, the 53,800-square-foot crenellated three story brick and steel armory is situated on 1.2 acres in Downtown Paterson., and has been compared to a fortress or castle. Soldiers were deployed for combat in the Spanish–American War, World War I and World War II from the armory which housed a unit descended from the old Second Infantry until 1956.

The arena was a site of rallies during the 1913 Paterson silk strike. It was also used as a venue for the circus, concerts, boxing matches, and basketball games. Native son Lou Costello, before beginning his career, once won a competition imitating Charlie Chaplin at the armory. The facility was last used by the military in March 1983. and the building was not in use after 1990. It was later sold to a private buyer, and then taken over by the city for non-payment of taxes.

== Preservation and re-use efforts ==
Sport was among the proposed uses in the late 20th century. Louis "Lou" Duva, boxing trainer and manager who began his career in the city, when looking for locations for a training center, cited the armory as a potential venue for a boxing club. Plans to restore the armory were under auspices of the city's parking authority. Proposals for a greatly expanded sports oriented facility were estimated to cost nearly $40 million, but funds were located to initiate basic repairs estimated at $9.8 million.

Interest in restoring the city-owned building grew after the city council rejected a proposal to sell the building to a self-storage company. A 2008 feasibility study by Grad Associates estimated the cost of renovation to be $12 million. The roof leaked, and many inside walls and floors suffered from water damage. While the building is structurally sounds repairs would necessarily include asbestos abatement and new fire stairwells and electrical, plumbing, and ventilation systems. The plan called for state-of-the-art, green recreation and community center, as a way to reduce juvenile delinquency. A 2009 geologic survey found the site to be contaminant-free. A non-binding referendum to provide $1.2 million in funding for the restoration project was approved in November 2009. Julio Tavarez, city councilman, envisions, a recreation and entertainment center for the municipal property. During the flooding due to the 1903 New Jersey hurricane, 1200 people took shelter at the armory. When it was unavailable to house evacuees during Hurricane Irene, Mayor of Paterson Jeffery Jones cited its potential in such situations as another reason for renovation. On June 24, 2018, the Paterson Press posted on NorthJersey.com, "Mayor Andre Sayegh said he has agreed to accept developer Charles Florio’s $3 million offer for the Paterson Armory site and the prominent builder has plans to transform what has been an eyesore for decades into a 138-unit luxury housing complex."

== See also ==
- Jersey City Armory
- Teaneck Armory
- National Guard Militia Museum of New Jersey
- Hinchliffe Stadium
