= New York Knicks =

National Basketball Association team in New York City

- 2026–27 New York Knicks season
- Conference: Eastern
- Division: Atlantic
- Founded: 1946
- History: New York Knicks; 1946–present
- Arena: Madison Square Garden
- Location: New York City, New York
- Team colors: Royal blue, orange, silver, black, white
- Main sponsor: Experience Abu Dhabi
- President: Leon Rose
- General manager: Gersson Rosas
- Head coach: Mike Brown
- Ownership: Madison Square Garden Sports (James L. Dolan, Executive Chairman)
- Affiliation: Westchester Knicks
- Championships: 3 (1970, 1973, 2026)
- Conference titles: 5 (1972, 1973, 1994, 1999, 2026)
- Division titles: 8 (1953, 1954, 1970, 1971, 1989, 1993, 1994, 2013)
- NBA Cup titles: 1 (2025)
- Retired numbers: 8 (10, 12, 15, 15, 19, 22, 24, 33, 613)
- Website: nba.com/knicks
Association	Icon	Statement
City

The New York Knickerbockers, commonly called the New York Knicks, are an American professional basketball team based in the New York City borough of Manhattan. The Knicks compete in the National Basketball Association (NBA) as a member of the Atlantic Division of the Eastern Conference. The team plays its home games at Madison Square Garden, an arena it shares with the New York Rangers of the National Hockey League (NHL). They are one of two NBA teams in New York City, the other being the Brooklyn Nets. Alongside the Boston Celtics, the Knicks are one of two original NBA teams still in their original cities.

Established in 1946 by Ned Irish, the New York Knicks were among the founding members of the Basketball Association of America (BAA), which merged with the National Basketball League (NBL) in 1949 to form the NBA. Under their first head coach, Joe Lapchick, the Knicks were a perennial playoff contender, reaching three consecutive NBA Finals between 1951 and 1953 but never winning a championship. After Lapchick resigned in 1956, the franchise entered a prolonged decline, reaching the playoffs once between 1956 and 1966.

The Knicks returned to prominence in the late 1960s under head coach Red Holzman, winning their first NBA championships in 1970 and 1973. They made six playoff appearances in the 1980s but did not reach the NBA Finals. In the 1990s, led by Hall of Fame center Patrick Ewing and the team's physical, defense-oriented style under head coaches Pat Riley and Jeff Van Gundy, the Knicks reached the NBA Finals in 1994 and 1999, but did not win a championship. After Ewing's departure, the Knicks entered another prolonged period of playoff absences, and although Hall of Fame forwards Carmelo Anthony and Amar'e Stoudemire led the team to a division title in 2013 (their first in 19 years), the team suffered their worst-ever regular season records thereafter.

After signing guard Jalen Brunson in 2022, and acquiring Josh Hart, OG Anunoby, Mikal Bridges, and Karl-Anthony Towns between 2023 and 2024, the Knicks returned to playoff contention and won the NBA championship in 2026, ending their 53-year championship drought.

== History ==
=== 1946–1967: Early years ===
In 1946, basketball, particularly college basketball, was a growing and increasingly profitable sport in New York City. Ice hockey was another popular sport at the time and generated considerable profits; however, ice hockey arenas were not used often. Max Kase, a New York sportswriter, became the sports editor at the Boston American in the 1930s, when he met Boston Garden owner Walter A. Brown. Kase developed the idea of an organized professional league to showcase college players upon their graduation, and felt it could become profitable if properly assembled. Brown, intrigued by the opportunity to attain additional income when ice hockey teams were not playing or on the road, contacted several arena owners. On June 6, 1946, Kase and Brown and a group of seventeen others assembled at the Commodore Hotel in New York City to found the Basketball Association of America (BAA), where charter franchises were granted to major cities throughout the country.

Ned Irish, a college basketball promoter, retired sportswriter and then president of Madison Square Garden, was in attendance. Kase originally planned to own and operate the New York franchise himself, and approached Irish with a proposal to lease the Garden. Irish explained that the rules of the Arena Managers Association of America stated that Madison Square Garden was required to own any professional teams that played in the arena. On the day of the meeting, Kase made his proposal to the panel of owners; however, they were much more impressed by Irish and his vast resources. Kase relented and the franchise was awarded to Irish.

Irish wanted a distinct name for his franchise that was representative of the city of New York. He called together members of his staff for a meeting to cast their votes in a hat. After tallying the votes, the franchise was named the Knickerbockers. The "Knickerbocker" name stems from the pseudonymous pen name used by Washington Irving in his A History of New York, a name that became applied to the descendants of the original Dutch settlers of what later became New York, and later, by extension, to New Yorkers in general. In search of a head coach, Irish approached successful St. John's University coach Joe Lapchick in May 1946. Lapchick readily accepted after Irish promised to make him the highest-paid coach in the league; however, he requested he remain at St. John's one more season in hopes of winning one last championship. Irish obliged, hiring former Manhattan College coach Neil Cohalan as interim coach for the first year.

With no college draft in the league's initial year, there was no guarantee that the Knicks or the league itself would thrive. Consequently, teams focused on signing college players from their respective cities as a way to promote the professional league. The Knicks held their first training camp in the Catskill Mountains at the Nevele Country Club. Twenty-five players were invited to attend the three-week session. Players worked out twice a day and the chemistry between the New York natives was instant. With a roster assembled, the Knicks faced the Toronto Huskies at Toronto's Maple Leaf Gardens on November 1, 1946, in what would be the franchise's first game—as well as the first in league history. In a low-scoring affair presented in front of 7,090 spectators, the Knicks defeated the Huskies 68–66, with Leo Gottlieb leading the Knicks in scoring with 14 points. With Madison Square Garden's crowded schedule, the Knicks were forced to play many of their home games at the 69th Regiment Armory during the team's early years. The Knicks went on to finish their inaugural campaign with a 33–27 record and achieved a playoff berth under Cohalan despite a dismal shooting percentage of 28 percent. The Knicks faced the Cleveland Rebels in the quarterfinals, winning the series 2–1. However, the Knicks were swept by the Philadelphia Warriors in two games in the semifinals.

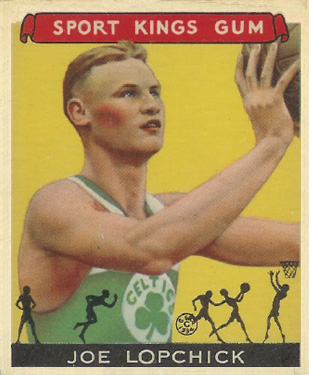
Lapchick was responsible for leading the Knicks during their early success. However, these ventures never culminated with a win in the NBA Finals.

As promised, Lapchick took over in 1947, bringing with him his up-tempo coaching style, which emphasized fast ball movement. Six new players were signed, including guard Carl Braun and Japanese-American guard Wataru Misaka, the first non-Caucasian basketball player in the BAA. Under Lapchick, the Knicks made nine straight playoff appearances beginning in 1947. Braun, who averaged 14.3 points, emerged as the team's star and paired with Dick Holub and Bud Palmer to account for half of the team's offense. Despite this, the Knicks struggled throughout the year, compiling a 26–22 record. Their finish was good enough to place them second in the Eastern Division and secure a playoff match-up against the Baltimore Bullets, where they lost the series two games to one. In the 1948 NBA draft, the Knicks selected two future Hall of Fame players in center Dolph Schayes and Harry Gallatin. The Knicks were leery of Schayes' talent, prompting the center to leave to play for the Syracuse Nationals of the struggling National Basketball League. Despite losing Schayes, the team started the year well, going 17–8 before they fell into a slump. They ended the year with a seven-game win streak to finish with a 32–28 record and a third-straight playoff appearance. The Knicks defeated the Bullets in a rematch of their previous encounter in 1947, winning the series 2–1. The team however struggled against the Washington Capitols and lost the series 1–2.

Prior to the beginning of the 1949–50 season, the BAA merged with the National Basketball League to form the National Basketball Association, which initially comprised 17 teams. Despite division realignments, the Knicks remained in the Eastern Division. The team continued its dominance under Lapchick, winning 40 games; however they lost the Eastern Division finals to the Syracuse Nationals. The following season, the Knicks made history signing Nathaniel Clifton to a contract, thus becoming the first professional basketball team to sign an African American player. During this same season, the Knicks finished with a 36–30 record. Though they placed third in their division, they secured a playoff spot and made the first of three consecutive trips to the NBA Finals. In the 1951 Finals, the Knicks could not overcome the Rochester Royals despite a valiant comeback after losing the first three games of the series. The next two years, in 1952 and 1953, New York fell to the Minneapolis Lakers in the Finals. In the first couple of seasons following the BAA's merger with the NBL to become the NBA, the Knicks under Ned Irish's ownership and management would threaten to leave the newly-merged league multiple times in relation to some of the things going on with the NBL's teams that were entering the newly-merged NBA in question (such as location problems or conduct that was seen as "disgraceful" toward the Knicks), though they ultimately never left the league despite the threats being perceived as serious ones at the time due to the team's status within the league.

It was during this early period that the Knicks developed their first standout player in Carl Braun, who retired as the Knicks leading scorer with 10,449 points before later being surpassed by the likes of Patrick Ewing, Walt Frazier and Willis Reed. Harry Gallatin and Dick McGuire were also well-known standouts on the team and were later enshrined in the Naismith Memorial Basketball Hall of Fame. Following these back-to-back Finals losses, the Knicks again made the playoffs in the subsequent two years, but with no success. Lapchick resigned as the team's head coach in January 1956, citing health-related issues. Vince Boryla made his debut in February 1956 as the Knicks' new coach in a win over the St. Louis Hawks. However, after two seasons of poor performances and no playoff appearances, Boryla tendered his resignation from the team in April 1958.

Looking to regain their former dominance, the Knicks named Andrew Levane as head coach, and in his first year the results were significantly better, as the team finished with a 40–32 record, securing a playoff spot. However, the Knicks could not manage to get past the Eastern Division semifinals. The Levane-led squad fared poorly to begin the 1959–60 season, and under mounting pressure, Levane resigned and was immediately replaced by Carl Braun, who became the team's first player-coach. The team did not fare much better under Braun, and so the Knicks hired Eddie Donovan, who had helped build up St. Bonaventure's basketball team, in 1961. During Donovan's tenure, New York failed to achieve a playoff berth. As a testament to their struggles, on March 2, 1962, the Knicks faced the Philadelphia Warriors in Hershey, Pennsylvania, where they infamously allowed Wilt Chamberlain to score an NBA-record 100 points in a 169–147 Warriors victory.

In 1964, the franchise's fortunes began to take a steady turn. The Knicks drafted center Willis Reed, who made an immediate impact on the court and was named NBA Rookie of the Year for his efforts. However, the leaders of the team still remained in flux. In an attempt to reorganize, the Knicks named former standout Harry Gallatin as head coach while reassigning Donovan to the general manager position. After a slow start in 1965, Dick McGuire, another former Knick, replaced his former teammate Gallatin midway through the season. Though he failed to guide the Knicks to the playoffs in 1965, he managed to do so the following season; however, the Knicks lost in the Eastern Division semifinals.

=== 1967–1975: Championship years ===
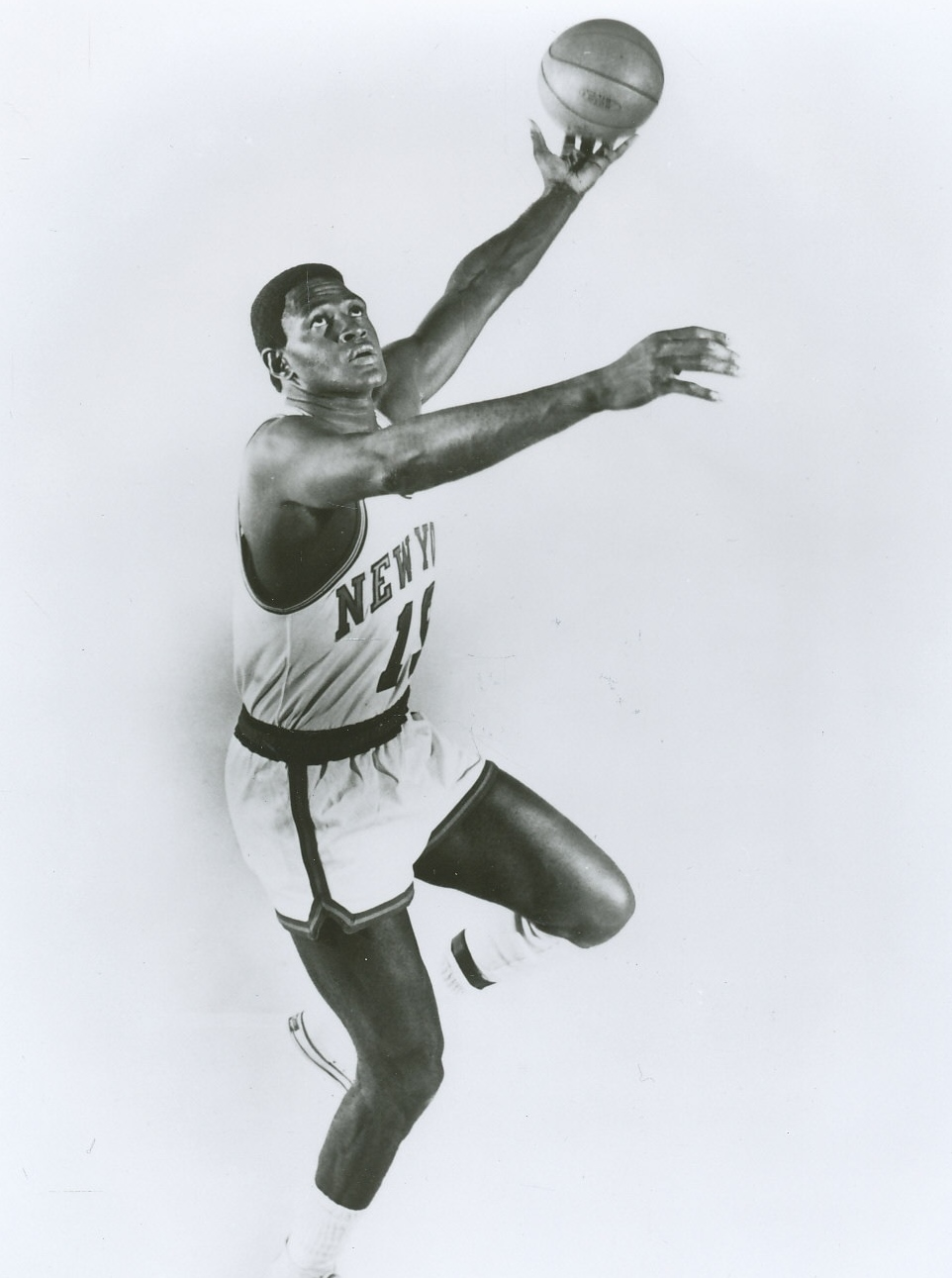
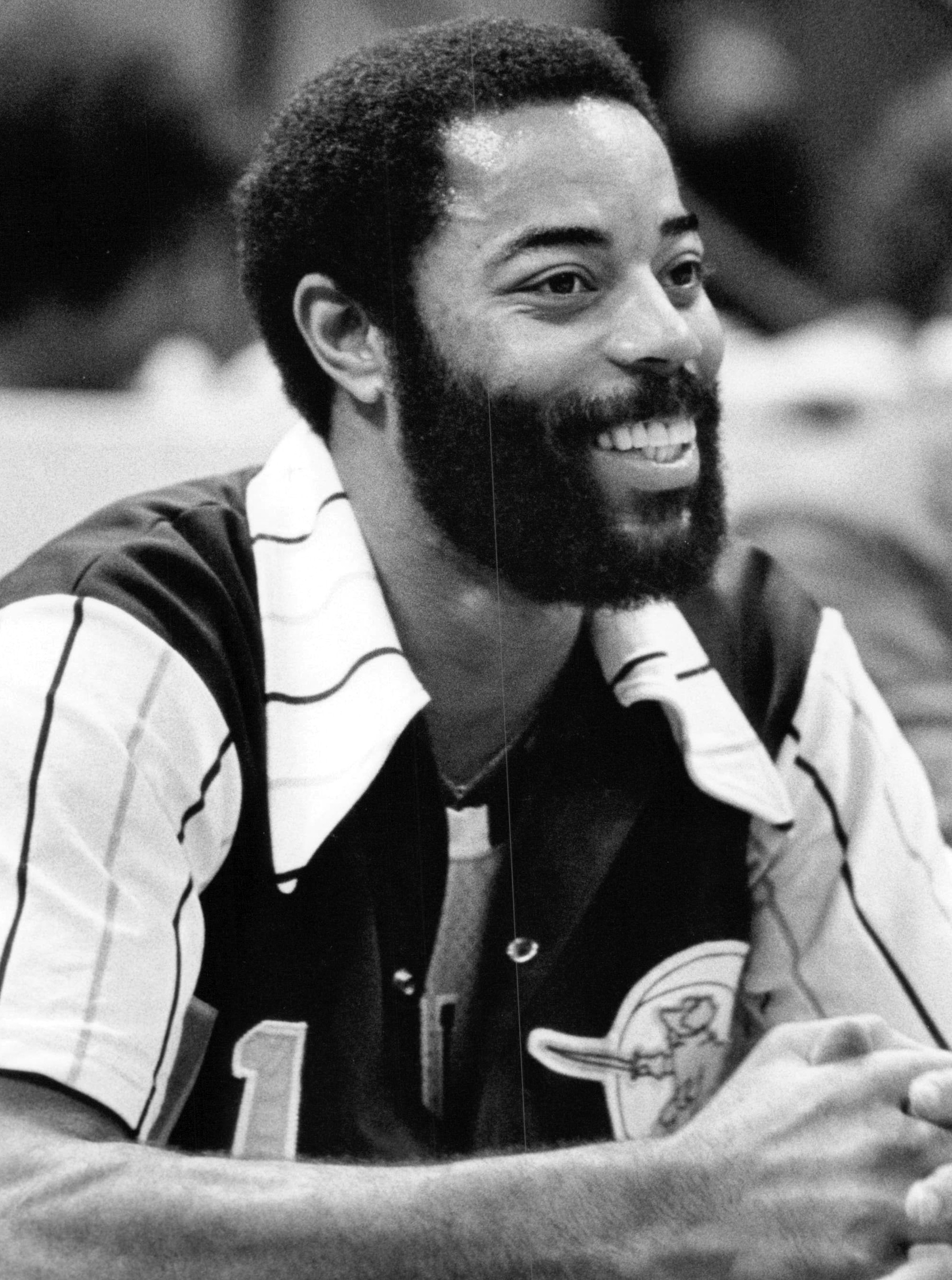
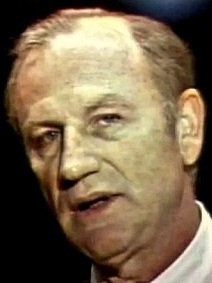
Willis Reed and Walt "Clyde" Frazier, under coach Red Holzman, brought the Knicks two NBA Championships in the early 1970s

The Knicks started their 1967–68 season with a 124–122 win over the visiting Warriors. In that game, seven players on the Knicks' roster scored in double figures. However, the Knicks lost their next six games, falling to a 1–6 record. They managed to stop their losing streak on November 1, 1967, when the Knicks won a road game against the Lakers, 129–113. During the game, Willis Reed scored a career-high 53 points on 21-of-29 shooting from the field. On November 3, the Knicks defeated the Seattle SuperSonics 134–100 in Seattle. In that game, nine Knicks' player scored at least 10 points. Head coach Dick McGuire was replaced midway through the 1967–68 season after the team began the season with a 15–22 record. With the Knicks under .500, the team decided to hire coach Red Holzman, whose impact was immediate. Under his direction, the Knicks went 28–17 and finished the season with a 43–39 record, managing to obtain a playoff berth; however, the Knicks were again vanquished in the Eastern Division semifinals by the Philadelphia 76ers. However, their roster was slowly coming together, piece by piece. Rookies Phil Jackson and Walt Frazier were named to the NBA All-Rookie Team, while Dick Barnett and Willis Reed were selected for the 1968 NBA All-Star Game.

The following season, the team acquired Dave DeBusschere from the Detroit Pistons, and the team went 54–28. In the playoffs, New York made it past the first round for the first time since 1953, sweeping the Baltimore Bullets in four games, before falling to the Boston Celtics in the Eastern Division finals. In the 1969–70 season, the Knicks had a then-single-season NBA-record 18 straight victories en route to a 60–22 record, which was the best regular season record in the franchise's history to that point. As a result, the team finished the regular season with the top spot in the league. After defeating the Bullets in the Eastern Division semifinals and the Milwaukee Bucks in the Eastern Division finals, the Knicks faced the Los Angeles Lakers in the NBA Finals. With the series tied at 2–2, the Knicks would be tested in game 5. Willis Reed tore a muscle in his right leg in the second quarter, and was lost for the rest of the game. Despite his absence, New York went on to win the game, rallying from a 16-point deficit.

Without their injured captain, the Knicks lost game 6, setting up one of the most famous moments in NBA history. Reed limped onto the court before the seventh game, determined to play through the pain of his injury. He scored New York's first two baskets before going scoreless for the remainder of the contest. Although he was not at full strength, Reed's heroics inspired the Knicks, and they won the game by a score of 113–99, allowing New York to capture the title that had eluded them for so long. Reed, who had been named the All-Star MVP and the league's MVP that season, was named MVP of the Finals, becoming the first player to attain all three awards in a single season.

The Knicks' success continued for the next few years. After losing to the Bullets in the Eastern Conference finals in 1971, the team, aided by the acquisitions of Jerry Lucas and Earl "The Pearl" Monroe, returned to the Finals in 1972. This time the Knicks fell to the Lakers in five games. The next year, the results were reversed, as the Knicks defeated the Lakers in five games to win their second NBA title in four years. The team had one more impressive season in 1973–74, as they reached the Eastern Conference finals, where they fell in five games to the Celtics. It was after this season that Willis Reed announced his retirement, and the team's fortunes began to shift once more.

=== 1975–1985: Post-championship years ===
In the 1974–75 season, the Knicks posted a 40–42 record, their first losing record in eight seasons. The team still qualified for a playoff spot, but lost to the Houston Rockets in the first round. After two more seasons with losing records, Holzman was replaced by Willis Reed, who signed a three-year contract. In Reed's first year, New York finished the season with a 43–39 record and returned to the Eastern Conference semifinals, where they were swept by the Philadelphia 76ers. The next season, after the team began with a 6–8 record, Holzman was rehired as the team's coach after Reed had angered Madison Square Garden president Sonny Werblin. The team did not fare any better under Holzman's direction, finishing with a 31–51 record, their worst in thirteen years.

After improving to a 39–43 record in the 1979–80 season, the Knicks posted a 50–32 record in the 1980–81 season. In the playoffs, the Chicago Bulls swept New York in two games. Holzman retired the following season as one of the winningest coaches in NBA history. The team's record that year was a dismal 33–49. However, Holzman's legacy would continue through the players he influenced. One of the Knicks' bench players and defensive specialists during the 1970s was Phil Jackson. Jackson went on to coach the Chicago Bulls and Los Angeles Lakers to 11 NBA championships, surpassing Red Auerbach for the most in NBA history. Jackson cited Holzman as a significant influence on his career in the NBA.

Hubie Brown replaced Holzman as head coach, and in his first season, the team went 44–38 and made it to the second round of the playoffs, where they were swept by the eventual champion Philadelphia 76ers. The next season, the team, aided by new acquisition Bernard King, improved to 47–35 and returned to the playoffs. The team defeated the Detroit Pistons in the first round with an overtime win in the fifth and deciding game, before losing in the second round in seven games to the Celtics. The team's struggles continued into the 1984–85 season, as they lost their last 12 games to finish with a 24–58 record. The first of these losses occurred on March 23, 1985, where King injured his knee and spent the next 24 months in rehabilitation.

=== 1985–2000: The Patrick Ewing era ===
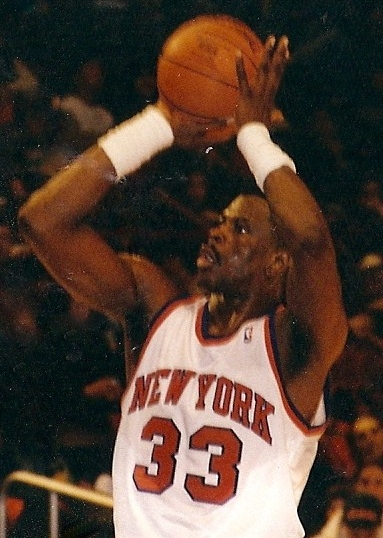
Patrick Ewing played for the Knicks from 1985 to 2000, leading them to the Finals in 1994 and 1999.

In the summer of 1985, the Knicks were entered into the first-ever NBA draft lottery. The Knicks ended up winning the number one pick in that year's NBA draft. They used the pick to select star center Patrick Ewing of Georgetown University. In Ewing's first season with the Knicks, he led all rookies in scoring (20 points per game) and rebounds (9 rebounds per game), and he won the NBA Rookie of the Year Award. The team would not fare as well, though, as they struggled to a 23–59 record in his first season.

During Ewing's second season, the team started with a 4–12 record and head coach Hubie Brown was dismissed in favor of assistant Bob Hill. Under Hill, the Knicks had brief successes but went on to lose seventeen of their twenty-one final games of the season to finish 20–46 under Hill and 24–58 on the season. Hill was dismissed at season's end.

The team immediately turned around in the 1987–88 season with the hiring of Rick Pitino as head coach, who, only months prior to his hiring, had led Providence College to the Final Four, turning around a program that had struggled prior to his arrival. Combined with the selection of point guard Mark Jackson, who won the NBA Rookie of the Year Award and garnered MVP consideration, in the draft and with Ewing's consistently stellar play, the Knicks made the playoffs with a record of 38–44, where they were defeated by the Celtics in the first round.

The resurgence continued the following season as the team traded backup center Bill Cartwright to the Bulls for power forward Charles Oakley before the season started and then posted a 52–30 record, which was good enough for their first division title in 18 years and their fifth division title in franchise history. In the playoffs, they defeated the 76ers in the first round before losing to the Chicago Bulls in the Eastern Conference semifinals.

Prior to the start of the 1989–90 season, Pitino departed from New York to coach for the University of Kentucky, leaving many stunned by his departure. Assistant Stu Jackson was named as Pitino's replacement, becoming the team's 14th head coach and the youngest head coach in the NBA, at the time, at the age of 32. Under Jackson's direction, the Knicks went 45–37 and defeated the Celtics in the first round of the playoffs, winning the final three games after losing the first two. They went on to lose to the eventual NBA champion Detroit Pistons in the next round. In October 1990, the Knicks won the McDonald's Open after defeating European champion POP 84 in the championship game by a score of 117–101. Patrick Ewing was named the tournament's MVP. However, Jackson and the Knicks struggled to a 7–8 record to begin the 1990–91 season, and Jackson was replaced by John MacLeod, who led the Knicks to a 32–35 record, ending the season with a 39–43 record overall that was good enough to earn the team another playoff appearance. The Knicks were swept in the first round by the eventual NBA champion Chicago Bulls.

==== 1991–1996: The Pat Riley/Don Nelson years ====
After the conclusion of the season, MacLeod left the team to become the head coach at the University of Notre Dame. President David Checketts reached out to Pat Riley, who was working as a commentator for the National Broadcasting Company (NBC), to see if he was interested in returning to coaching. Riley accepted the Knicks proposition on May 31, 1991. Riley, who coached the Lakers to four NBA titles during the 1980s, implemented a rough and physical style emphasizing defense. Under Riley, the team, led by Ewing and guard John Starks, who scored 24 points per game and 13.9 points per game respectively, improved to a 51–31 record, tying them for first place in the Atlantic Division. After defeating the Pistons in the first round of the playoffs, the team faced the Bulls, losing the series 4–3 in seven games. The 1992–93 season proved to be even more successful, as the Knicks won the Atlantic Division with a 60–22 record. Before the season, the Knicks traded Mark Jackson to the Los Angeles Clippers for Charles Smith, Doc Rivers, and Bo Kimble, while also acquiring Rolando Blackman from the Dallas Mavericks. After defeating the Indiana Pacers and Charlotte Hornets in the first two rounds of the playoffs, the Knicks made it to the Eastern Conference finals, where once again they met the Bulls. After taking a 2–0 series lead, the Knicks lost the next four games.

After the Bulls' Michael Jordan made what would be his first retirement from basketball prior to the 1993–94 season, many saw this as an opportunity for the Knicks to finally make it back to the NBA Finals. The team, who acquired Derek Harper in a midseason trade with the Dallas Mavericks, once again won the Atlantic Division, with a 57–25 record. In the playoffs, the team played a then NBA-record 25 games (the Boston Celtics played 26 games in the 2008 playoffs); they started by defeating the New Jersey Nets in the first round before finally getting past the Bulls, defeating them in the second round in seven games. In the Eastern Conference finals, they faced the Indiana Pacers, who at one point held a three games-to-two lead. They had this advantage thanks to the exploits of Reggie Miller, who scored 25 fourth-quarter points in game 5 to lead the Pacers to victory. However, the Knicks won the next two games to reach their first NBA Finals since 1973.

In the NBA Finals, the Knicks would play seven low-scoring, defensive games against the Houston Rockets. After splitting the first two games in Houston, the Knicks would win two out of three games at Madison Square Garden, which also hosted the New York Rangers' first Stanley Cup celebration in 54 years following their win over the Vancouver Canucks in game 7 of 1994 Stanley Cup Final during the series. In game 6, however, a last-second attempt at a game-winning shot by Starks was tipped by Rockets center Hakeem Olajuwon, giving the Rockets an 86–84 victory and forcing a game 7. The Knicks lost that game 90–84, credited in large part to Starks's dismal 2-for-18 shooting performance and Riley's stubborn refusal to bench Starks, despite having bench players who were renowned for their shooting prowess, such as Rolando Blackman and Hubert Davis, available. The loss denied New York the distinction of having both NBA and NHL championships in the same year. Nevertheless, the Knicks had gotten some inspiration from Mark Messier and the Rangers during the finals.

The next year, the Knicks finished in second place in the Atlantic Division with a 55–27 record. The team defeated the Cleveland Cavaliers before facing the Pacers again in the second round. The tone for the Knicks–Pacers series was set in game 1, as Miller once again became a clutch nuisance to the Knicks by scoring eight points in the final 9 seconds of the game to give the Pacers a 107–105 victory. The series went to a game 7, and when Patrick Ewing's last-second finger roll attempt to tie the game missed, the Pacers clinched the 97–95 win. Riley resigned the next day, and the Knicks hired Don Nelson as their new head coach.

While Nelson had been a successful coach before joining the Knicks, his offensive-oriented Nellie Ball philosophy failed to mesh with the team, and during the 1995–96 season, Nelson was fired after 59 games, and, instead of going after another well-known coach, the Knicks hired longtime assistant Jeff Van Gundy, who had no prior experience as a head coach. Van Gundy, who restored the team's defense-first style of his mentor Pat Riley, went 13–10 the rest of the way. The Knicks ended up with a 47–35 record that year, and swept the Cavaliers in the first round of the playoffs before losing to the eventual champion Bulls (who had an NBA record 72 wins in the regular season) in five games.

==== 1996–2000: The Jeff Van Gundy years ====
In the 1996–97 season, the Knicks, with the additions of such players as Larry Johnson and Allan Houston, registered a 57–25 record. In the playoffs, the Knicks swept the Charlotte Hornets in the first round before facing the Miami Heat (coached by Riley) in the second round. The Knicks took a 3–1 lead in the series before a brawl near the end of game 5 resulted in suspensions of key players. Many of the suspended Knicks players, Ewing in particular, were disciplined not for participating in the altercation itself, but for violating an NBA rule stipulating that a benched player may not leave the bench during a fight (the rule was subsequently amended, making it illegal to leave the "bench area"). With Ewing and Houston suspended for game 6, Johnson and Starks suspended for game 7, and Charlie Ward suspended for both, the Knicks lost the series.

The 1997–98 season was marred by a wrist injury to Ewing on December 22, which forced him to miss the rest of the season and much of the playoffs. The team, which had a 43–39 record that season, still managed to defeat the Heat in the first round of the playoffs (a series which saw another violent bench-clearing brawl at the end of game 4, this time between Johnson and former Hornets teammate Alonzo Mourning) before having another matchup with the Pacers in the second round. Ewing returned in time for game two of the series. This time, the Pacers easily won the series in five games, as Reggie Miller once again broke the hearts of Knicks fans by hitting a tying three-pointer with 5.1 seconds remaining in game 4, en route to a Pacers overtime victory. For the fourth straight year, the Knicks were eliminated in the second round of the playoffs.

Prior to the lockout-shortened 1998–99 season, the Knicks traded Charles Oakley to the Toronto Raptors for Marcus Camby while also trading John Starks in a package to the Golden State Warriors for 1994's first team all-league shooting guard Latrell Sprewell (whose contract was voided by the Warriors after choking Warriors' head coach P. J. Carlesimo during the previous season). After barely getting into the playoffs with a 27–23 record, the Knicks started a Cinderella run. It started with the Knicks eliminating the first-seeded Heat in the first round after Allan Houston bounced in a running one-hander off the front of the rim and high off the backboard, with 0.8 seconds left in the deciding game 5. This remarkable upset marked only the second time in NBA history, and first in the Eastern Conference, that an eighth seed had defeated a first seed in the NBA playoffs. After defeating the Atlanta Hawks in the second round four games to none, they faced the Pacers yet again in the Eastern Conference finals. Despite losing Ewing to injury for the rest of the playoffs prior to game 3, the Knicks won the series (aided in part to a four-point play by Johnson in the final seconds of game 3) to become the first eighth-seeded playoff team to make it to the NBA Finals. However, in the Finals, the San Antonio Spurs, with superstars David Robinson and Tim Duncan, proved too much for the injury-laden Knicks, who lost in five games. The remarkable fifth game of this Finals is remembered for its second half scoring duel between the Spurs' Tim Duncan and the Knicks' Latrell Sprewell, and was decided by a long jumper by Avery Johnson with 47 seconds left to clinch the title for the Spurs.

The 1999–2000 season would prove to be the last one in New York for Ewing, as the Knicks, who had a 50–32 record that season, swept the Toronto Raptors, a team led by Vince Carter, Antonio Davis and a young Tracy McGrady, in three games in the first round, and then defeated the Miami Heat in another dramatic seven-game series, in which Ewing's dunk with over a minute remaining in game 7 provided the winning margin in a 1-point road victory. They would, however, lose in the Eastern Conference finals to the Reggie Miller-led Indiana Pacers in six games. After the season, Ewing was traded, on September 20, 2000, to the Seattle SuperSonics, and the Ewing era, which produced many successful playoff appearances but no NBA championship titles, came to an end.

=== 2000–2003: Downfall ===
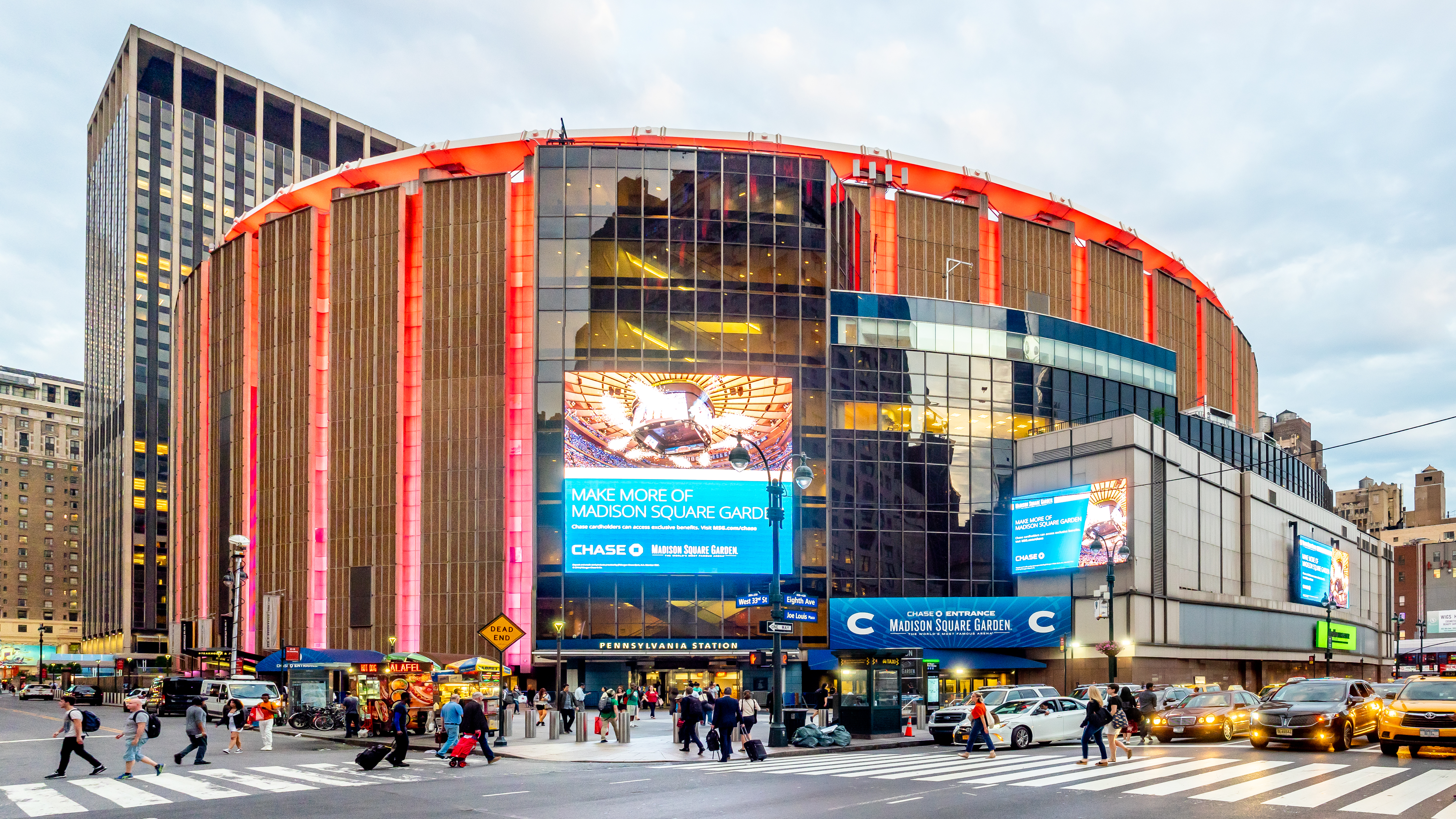
The current Madison Square Garden has been the home of the Knicks since 1968.

Despite the loss of Ewing, the Knicks remained successful in the regular season, as they posted a 48–34 record under the direction of Houston and Sprewell. In the first round of playoff contention, however, New York fell to the Toronto Raptors in five games, failing to get past the first round of the playoffs for the first time in a decade. After a poor start to the 2001–02 season, the Knicks managed to get above .500 with a 10–9 record. In spite of their recent success, Van Gundy unexpectedly resigned as head coach on December 8, 2001, explaining he had "lost focus" and would no longer be able to properly coach the team. The team, which named longtime assistant Don Chaney as their new head coach, ended the season with a 30–52 record, and for the first time since the 1986–87 season they did not qualify for the playoffs.

In October 2002, the team elected to extend Chaney's contract for another year. Rather than rebuilding, the Knicks opted to add veterans to the roster including Antonio McDyess, who had been dealing with knee problems in the preceding years. Furthermore, the Knicks were criticized by many analysts as multiple players on the roster were overpaid in light of their poor performances, causing salary cap problems that would persist until Donnie Walsh took over as team president. McDyess injured his knee during the team's third preseason game and was subjected to further operations in April 2003 after a CT scan revealed the injured knee necessitated he undergo bone-graft surgery. The Knicks managed only seven wins in their first twenty games, setting the tone for the rest of the season, which they completed with a 37–45 record; it was their second consecutive season without a playoff appearance.

=== 2003–2008: Isiah Thomas era ===
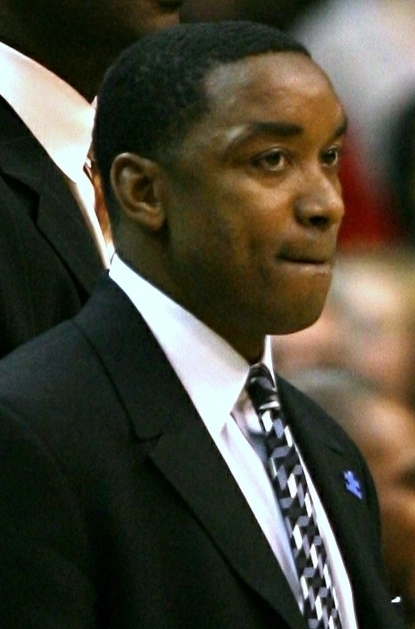
Isiah Thomas as coach of the Knicks in 2007. He stayed six years on the bench

After a 10–18 start to the 2003–04 season, the Knicks underwent a massive overhaul. Isiah Thomas was named the Knicks' president on December 22, 2003, upon the firing of Scott Layden. Thomas continued to restructure the team, firing Chaney after an unproductive tenure and hiring Hall of Famer Lenny Wilkens to coach the team. Additionally, Thomas orchestrated multiple trades, including one that brought point guard Stephon Marbury to the team. The team qualified for the playoffs that year with a 39–43 record, but were swept by the New Jersey Nets in the first round. The series included a highly publicized spat between the Knicks' Tim Thomas and Nets' Kenyon Martin, in which Thomas all but challenged Martin to a fight and called him "Fugazy". The following season, the Knicks struggled to a 17–22 record before Wilkens resigned as head coach. Herb Williams, who had previously coached the team in a game against the Orlando Magic prior to the team hiring Wilkens, took over as interim head coach for the remainder of the season and did not fare much better, as the Knicks ended their season with a 33–49 record and out of playoff contention.

Hoping to find a leader that could put the team back on track, New York hired Larry Brown to coach the team. Brown, who idolized the team during his childhood, was well regarded for his coaching abilities and his arrival brought a sense of hope to the franchise. Hoping to find the next Patrick Ewing, the Knicks drafted center Channing Frye and signed centers Jerome James and Eddy Curry, the former prior to the season and the latter during the season. Curry, who reportedly had a worrying heart condition, refused to take a controversial DNA test, and fell out of favor with John Paxson, Chicago's general manager. The Bulls signed-and-traded him to the Knicks along with Antonio Davis for Tim Thomas, Michael Sweetney, the Knicks' 2006 first-round pick, and the right to swap first-round picks with the Knicks in 2007, as well as 2007 and 2009 second-round picks. Isiah Thomas did not lottery-protect the picks, and the Knicks forfeited the second pick in the 2006 draft, and the ninth in the 2007 draft. With a bloated payroll, the Knicks stumbled to the second worst record in the NBA that season, at 23–59. The season concluded with the firing and $18.5 million buy-out of head coach Larry Brown after one season.

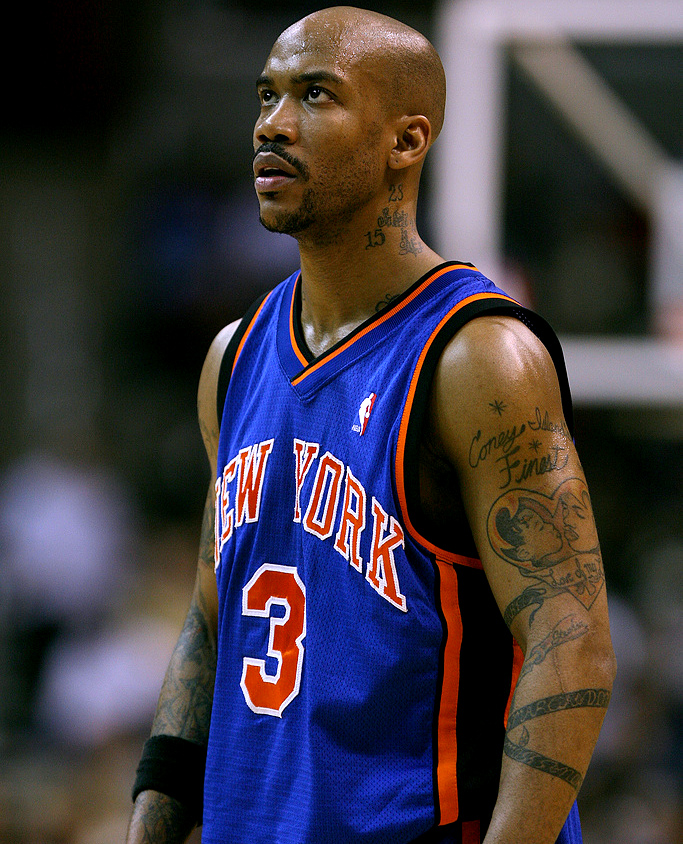
Stephon Marbury, a Brooklyn native, played for the Knicks from 2004 to 2009.

With the departure of Brown, team president Isiah Thomas took over the head coaching responsibilities. Thomas continued his practice of signing players to high-priced contracts while the franchise struggled to capitalize on their talent on the court. As a testament to their struggles, on December 16, 2006, the Knicks and the Denver Nuggets broke into a brawl during their game in Madison Square Garden. With multiple players still serving a suspension as a result of the brawl, on December 20, 2006, David Lee created one of the most memorable plays in recent Knicks history, and served as a bright spot as the team's struggles persisted, during a game against the Charlotte Bobcats. With a tie game and 0.1 seconds left on the game clock in double overtime, Jamal Crawford inbounded from the sideline, near half-court. The ball sailed towards the basket, and with that 0.1 seconds still remaining on the game clock, Lee tipped the ball off the backboard and into the hoop, giving the Knicks a 111–109 double overtime win. Per the Trent Tucker Rule, when the ball is put back into play with three-tenths of a second or less remaining, a player is allowed to score only by tipping the ball, making a play such as Lee's especially rare. The Knicks improved by ten games in the 2006–2007 campaign in spite of injuries that ravaged the team at the end of the year; they ended with a 33–49 record, avoiding a 50-loss season by defeating the Charlotte Bobcats 94–93 on the last day of the season.

During the 2007 off-season, the organization became embroiled in further controversy away from the basketball court. Anucha Browne Sanders, a former Knicks executive, had filed a sexual harassment lawsuit against Isiah Thomas and Madison Square Garden. Faced with a trial, the jury returned a verdict finding Thomas and Madison Square Garden liable for sexual harassment. The jury also levied $11.6 million in punitive damages against Madison Square Garden, though this was later reduced to $11.5 million in a settlement between both parties. The ordeal proved embarrassing for the franchise, revealing sordid details about Knicks management and the environment at Madison Square Garden. The Knicks struggled as they opened their 2007 campaign with a 2–9 record, leaving many Knicks fans frustrated with the franchise's lack of progress under Thomas. They began calling for the coach's firing, with the chant "Fire Isiah" becoming a common occurrence during Knicks' home games. On November 29, 2007, the Knicks were handed one of their worst defeats in their history by the Boston Celtics, with a final score of 104–59. This matched their third-largest margin of defeat. New York went on to post an eighth consecutive losing season and tied the franchise mark for their worst record ever, at 23–59.

=== 2008–2010: Rebuilding ===
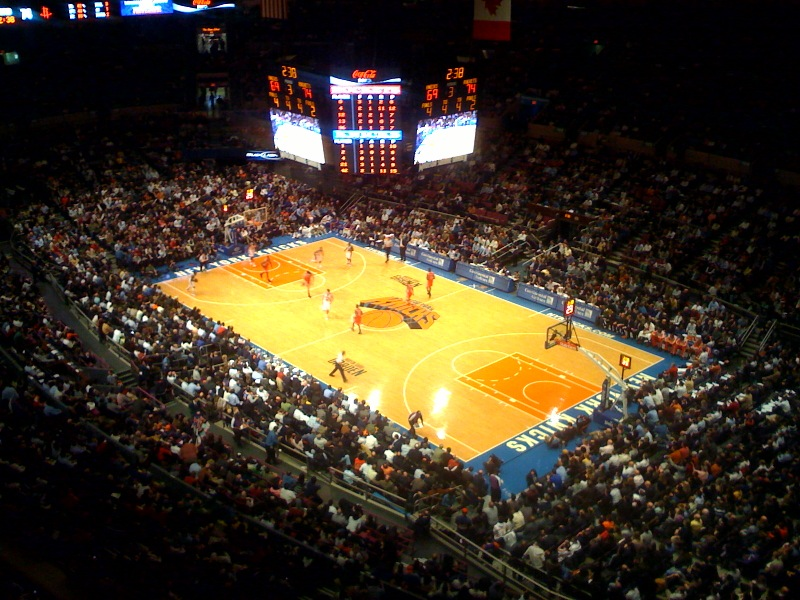
The Knicks in action at Madison Square Garden in the 2008–09 season.

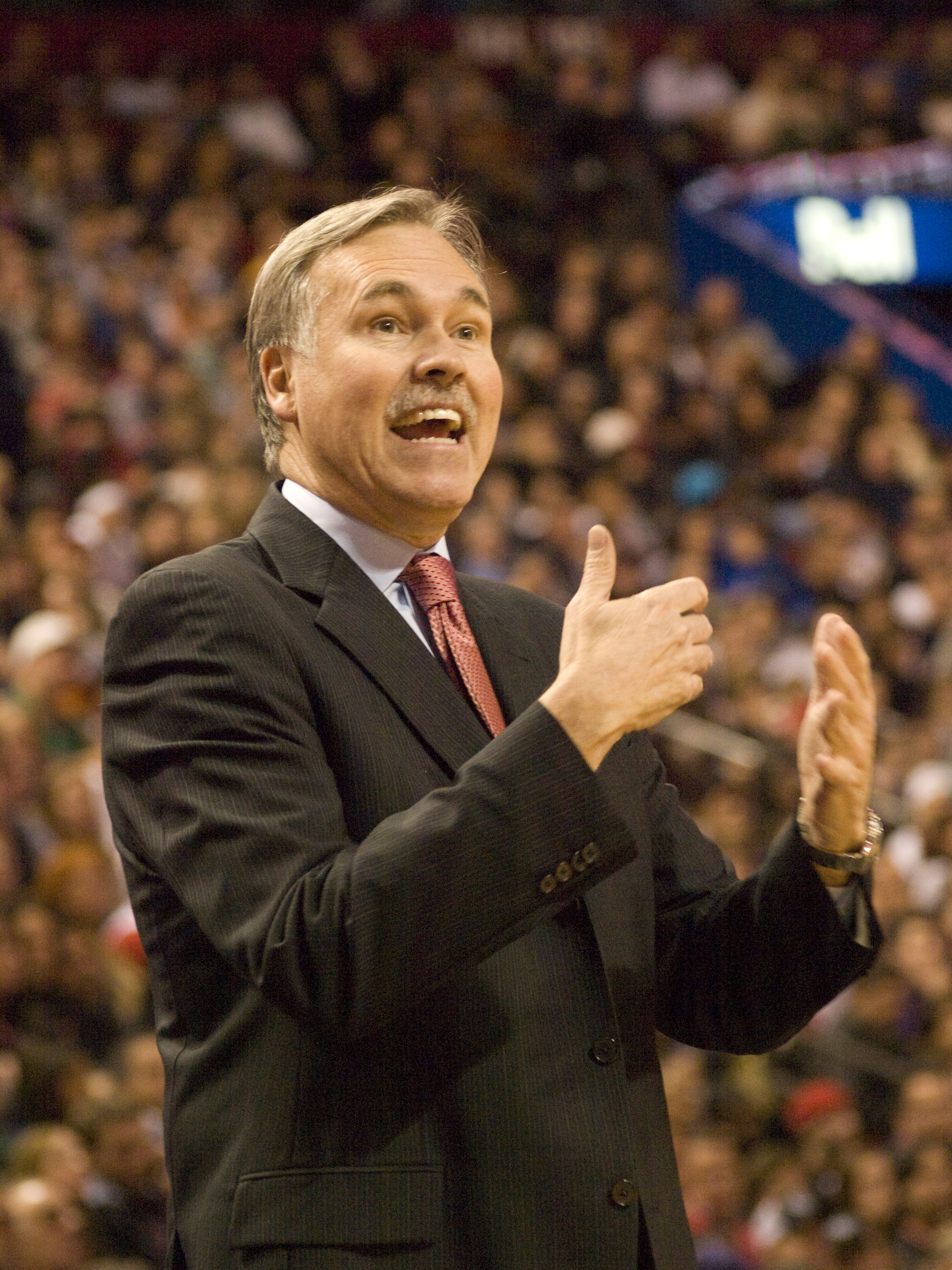
Mike D'Antoni, head coach of the Knicks from 2008 to 2012

MSG chairman James Dolan hired former Indiana Pacers President Donnie Walsh on April 2, 2008, to take over Isiah Thomas's role as team president. At the introductory press conference, Walsh, while not proclaiming to be a savior, did set goals, which included getting the team under the salary cap and bringing back a competitive environment. Upon the conclusion of the 2007–2008 regular season, Walsh fired Thomas, and on May 13, 2008, officially named former Phoenix Suns head coach Mike D'Antoni as head coach. D'Antoni signed a four-year, $24 million deal to coach the team. The Knicks, holding the sixth pick in the 2008 NBA draft, selected Danilo Gallinari on May 20, 2008.

On November 21, 2008, the Knicks dealt one of their top scorers, Jamal Crawford, to the Golden State Warriors for Al Harrington. Hours later, New York traded Zach Randolph, along with Mardy Collins, to the Los Angeles Clippers for Cuttino Mobley and Tim Thomas, with the intention of freeing cap space for the 2010 off-season, when top-flight players such as LeBron James, Dwyane Wade, Chris Bosh, and Amar'e Stoudemire would be available. In February 2009, the Knicks traded Tim Thomas, Jerome James, and Anthony Roberson to the Chicago Bulls for Larry Hughes, in addition to sending Malik Rose to the Oklahoma City Thunder for Chris Wilcox.

Additionally, the long-standing controversy with Stephon Marbury ended when the two sides agreed to a buy-out of Marbury's contract, which allowed him to sign with the Celtics when he cleared waivers on February 27, 2009. In spite of a volatile roster, the Knicks improved by nine wins in 2008–09 from the previous season in D'Antoni's first season, to finish 32–50, coinciding with the emergence of forward-center David Lee, who led the league with 65 double-doubles, and the continued development of guard Nate Robinson and swingman Wilson Chandler.

In the 2009 NBA draft, the Knicks selected forward Jordan Hill eighth after targets such as Stephen Curry, Jonny Flynn, and Ricky Rubio were off the board. Guard Toney Douglas was then selected with a 29th overall pick, which was acquired from the Los Angeles Lakers. Shortly afterwards, New York executed a trade with the Memphis Grizzlies in which the Knicks acquired Darko Miličić in exchange for Quentin Richardson. The Knicks got off to their worst 10-game start in franchise history, producing nine losses, with just one win. The Knicks responded by winning nine games and losing six in December. On January 24, 2010, the Knicks suffered their worst home loss in Madison Square Garden history against the Dallas Mavericks in front of a sellout crowd. The 50-point loss was also the second-worst in Knicks franchise history.

On February 17, the Knicks shook up the roster, trading Miličić to the Minnesota Timberwolves for Brian Cardinal and cash considerations. A day later, the Knicks and Celtics swapped guard Nate Robinson for shooting guard Eddie House. The deal also included forward Marcus Landry going to the Celtics and the Knicks acquiring bench players J. R. Giddens and Bill Walker. The Knicks also acquired All-Star forward Tracy McGrady from the Houston Rockets and point guard Sergio Rodríguez from the Sacramento Kings in a three-way trade. The deal sent Knicks shooting guard Larry Hughes to Sacramento and forward Jordan Hill and power forward Jared Jeffries to Houston. The trades, orchestrated to give the Knicks more cap space for the summer of 2010, netted the Knicks $30 million of cap space. About three weeks after these team-changing trades, the Knicks played the Dallas Mavericks at American Airlines Center and blew them out by a score of 128–94 for their largest win of the season. However, the Knicks were eliminated from playoff contention in late March 2010 and completed their season with a 29–53 record, a regression from their first season under D'Antoni.

=== 2010–2013: Arrival of Carmelo Anthony ===
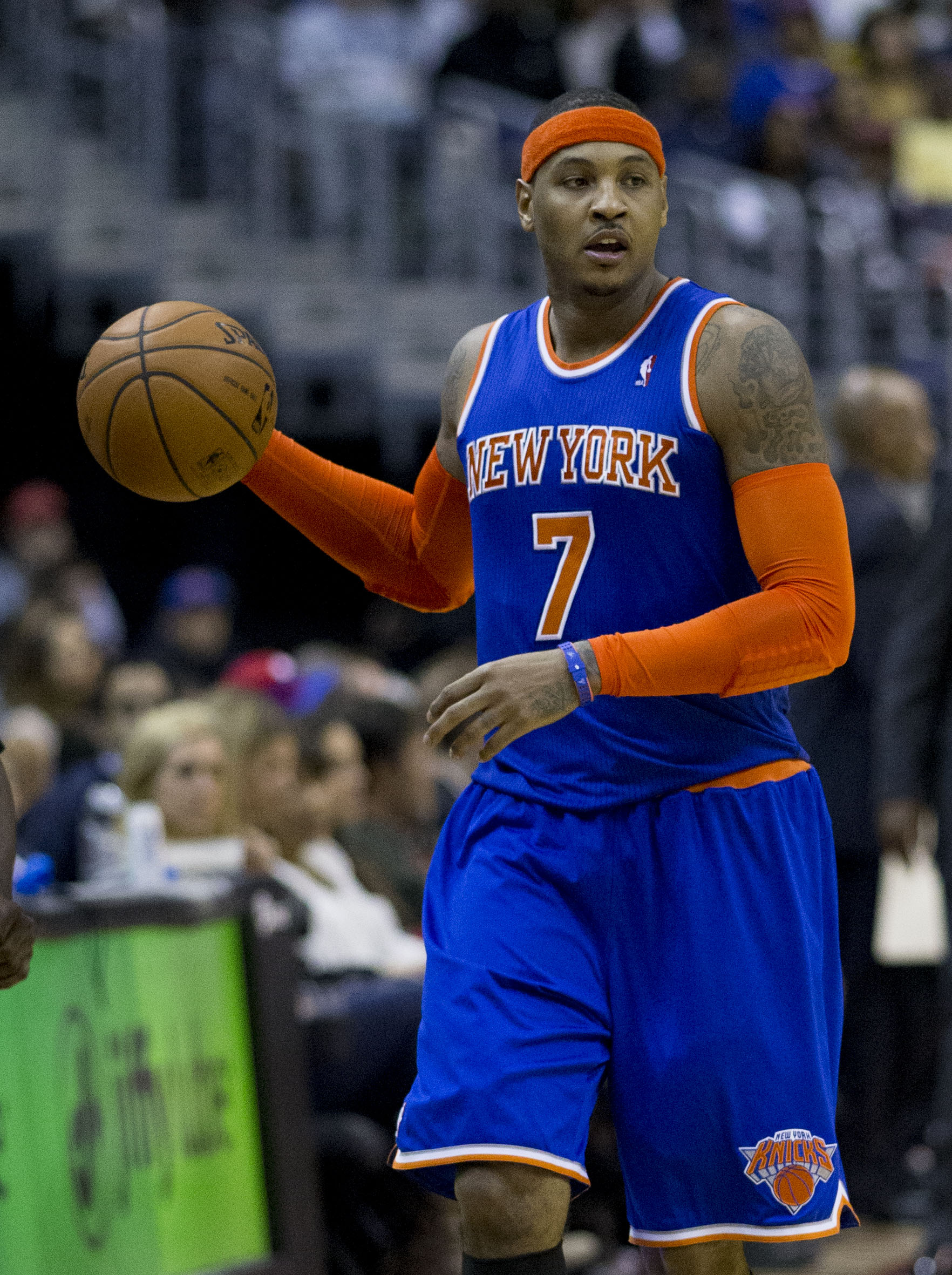
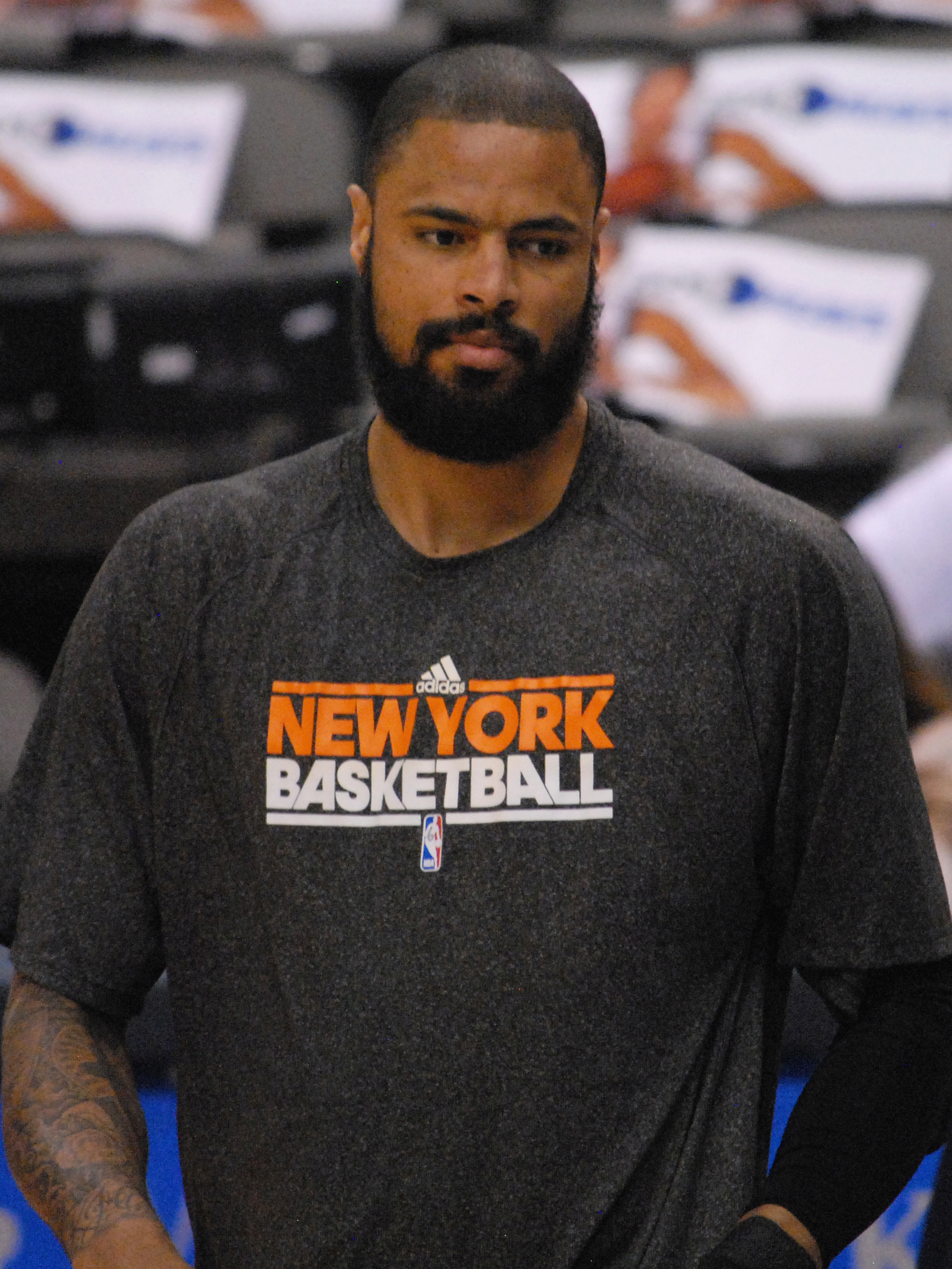
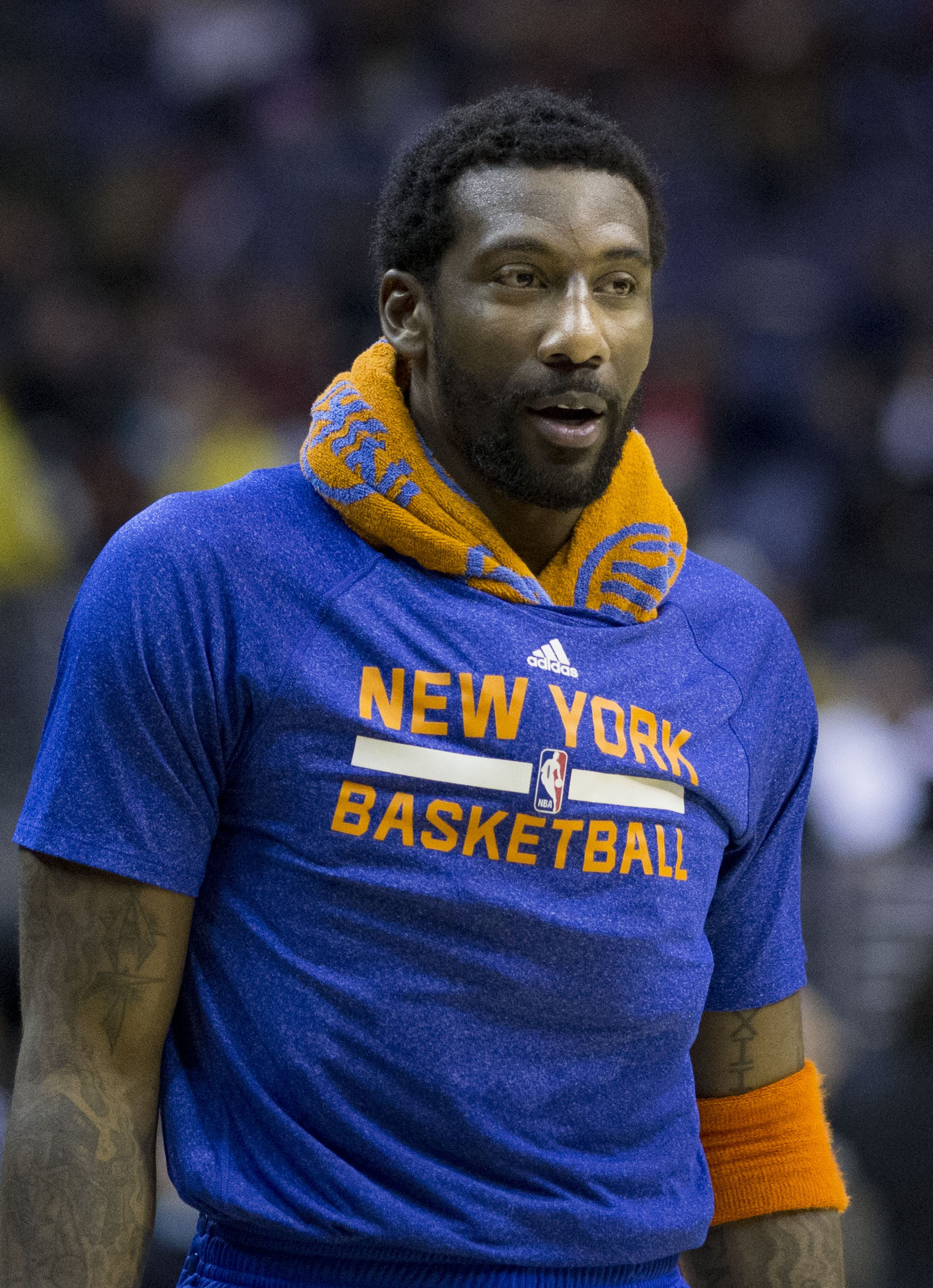
Carmelo Anthony, Tyson Chandler and Amar'e Stoudemire all featured in the starting lineup of the early 2010s Knicks

The Knicks and former Phoenix Suns forward-center Amar'e Stoudemire came to an agreement on July 5, 2010. The sign and trade deal was made official on July 8 as Stoudemire agreed to an approximately $100 million contract over the span of five years. Team president Donnie Walsh stated the signing of Stoudemire as a turning point for the future of a Knicks team that had struggled in recent years. The Knicks continued to redesign their roster, trading David Lee to the Golden State Warriors for Anthony Randolph, Kelenna Azubuike and Ronny Turiaf. The Knicks also struck deals with former Bobcats point guard Raymond Felton and Russian center Timofey Mozgov. The Knicks regained their title as the most valuable franchise in the NBA following these acquisitions, though this was mainly due to the arrival of Stoudemire, whose star power allowed the team to resurge; the Knicks sold out their full-season ticket inventory for the first time since 2002.

D'Antoni along with Stoudemire and the core of young players, including Felton, Danilo Gallinari, Mozgov, Wilson Chandler and rookie Landry Fields, piloted the Knicks to a 28–26 record prior to the All-Star break, marking the first time the team had been above the .500 mark at that point of the season since 2000. In spite of the team's mounting success, New York made a push to acquire Denver Nuggets forward Carmelo Anthony. After months of speculation, on February 22, 2011, Anthony was traded to New York, with teammates Chauncey Billups, Shelden Williams, Anthony Carter, and former Knicks player Renaldo Balkman. Denver acquired Felton, Danilo Gallinari, Wilson Chandler, Mozgov, Kosta Koufos, a 2014 first-round draft pick, the Warriors' second-round draft picks for 2013 and 2014 and $3 million in cash. In addition, the Knicks sent Anthony Randolph and Eddy Curry to the Minnesota Timberwolves and in return the Timberwolves' Corey Brewer was sent to the Knicks.

The Knicks clinched their first playoff berth since the 2004 NBA playoffs in a rout of the Cleveland Cavaliers on April 3, 2011. Carmelo Anthony ensured the franchise's first winning season since 2001 on April 10, 2011, against the Indiana Pacers, as Anthony scored the game-winning basket for the Knicks and subsequently blocked Danny Granger's shot in the final seconds of the game. The Knicks were ultimately eliminated from contention in the first round on April 24, 2011, by the Boston Celtics, losing the series 0–4. In spite of Donnie Walsh's successful efforts to help rebuild the franchise, he decided not to return as the team's president, electing to step down at the end of June 2011, citing the uncertainty surrounding his ability to continue to manage the daily operations of the team. Glen Grunwald was elected as interim president and general manager.

Following the conclusion of the 2011 NBA lockout, the Knicks engaged in a sign-and-trade deal with the Mavericks for center Tyson Chandler on December 10, 2011, with Chandler signing a four-year contract worth approximately $58 million. In return, the Knicks sent Andy Rautins to the Mavericks, generating a trade exception for Dallas. Ronny Turiaf and $3 million in cash considerations were sent to the Wizards to complete the three-way trade. The Knicks also obtained the draft rights to Ahmad Nivins and Georgios Printezis from Dallas. In order to fit Chandler under the salary cap, Chauncey Billups was earlier waived under the amnesty clause of the new collective bargaining agreement. To replace Billups at point guard, the Knicks signed Mike Bibby to a one-year, veteran minimum contract. The Knicks also signed veteran point guard Baron Davis on December 19 to a one-year contract. At the time, Davis had suffered a herniated disk and was not expected to compete for about 6–8 weeks, leaving Toney Douglas as the team's starting point guard. The Knicks struggled early in the season because Douglas and Bibby struggled to facilitate the offense and subsequently, it became stagnated. Subsequently, rookie Iman Shumpert was thrust into the role as the starting point guard after Douglas was relegated to the bench due to his struggles. In addition, head coach D'Antoni also decided to use Carmelo Anthony as a point forward to help generate a more up-tempo offense; however, there were concerns Anthony was holding the ball for too long, thus contributing to the stagnation of the Knicks' offense.

==== "Linsanity" ====
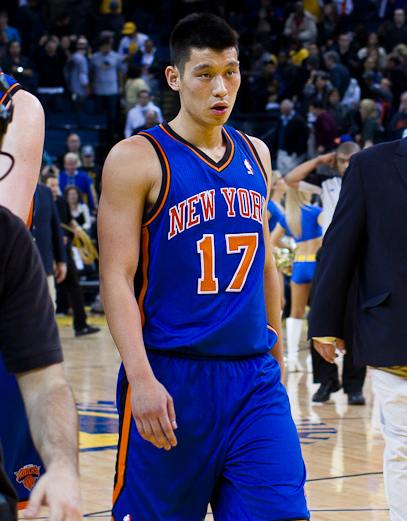
Jeremy Lin was a surprise player that came off the bench during the 2011–12 season.

With the Knicks struggling to an 8–15 record, D'Antoni inserted third-string point guard Jeremy Lin into the rotation against the New Jersey Nets on February 4, 2012. Lin, who had been claimed off waivers on December 27 following an injury to Iman Shumpert, scored 25 points and had seven assists en route to a Knicks win. Lin was praised for his ability to facilitate the offense, something the Knicks had struggled to do for the first 23 games of the season. Lin, exceeding expectations, was named the starter for the Knicks following a game against the Utah Jazz.

Lin guided the Knicks to a seven-game winning streak, despite being without Anthony and Amar'e Stoudemire for five games due to a groin injury and a death in the family respectively, that brought the team back to a .500 winning percentage. The surge of positive play by the Knicks accompanied by the performance of Lin caused extensive national and worldwide media coverage that was referred to as "Linsanity". To bolster their depth and perimeter shooting percentage, the Knicks signed J. R. Smith on February 18, 2012. The team struggled to congeal when Anthony returned from injury and went on to lose seven of eight games before head coach Mike D'Antoni resigned on March 14, 2012. Assistant Mike Woodson was named the interim head coach.

==== Under Mike Woodson ====
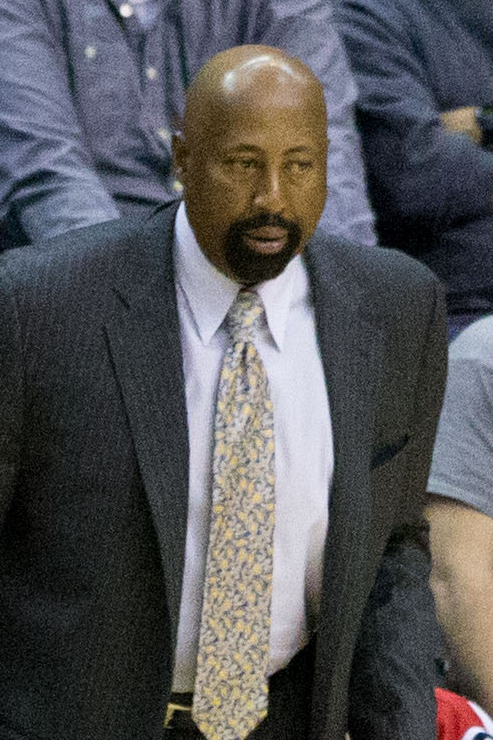
Mike Woodson, head coach of the Knicks from 2012 to 2014

Under Woodson, the Knicks finished 18–6 during the regular season and clinched a playoff spot for the second straight year this time as the seventh seed, making it the first time they have clinched consecutive playoff berths since making 13 straight playoff appearances from 1988 to 2001. Not only did they also clinch consecutive winning seasons for the first time in a decade, but their 36–30 record was the highest winning percentage for the team since the 2000–01 season. The Knicks faced the Miami Heat in the first round of the playoffs and lost the first three games, breaking the NBA record for longest playoff losing streak at 13 games. The team's struggles were partially attributed to injuries as Jeremy Lin, Baron Davis and Iman Shumpert were all sidelined by knee ailments. The Knicks proceeded to win a close game 4, which snapped their streak and ensured that they would not be swept out of the first round; however, they failed to keep up with the Heat's up-tempo offense in game 5 and lost the series 4–1. Despite the team's disappointing postseason exit, the Knicks removed Woodson's interim status and he was officially named the full-time head coach on May 25, 2012.

The Knicks began their off-season by selecting Greek forward Kostas Papanikolaou in the 2012 NBA draft. One week later, the team came to terms with veteran point guard Jason Kidd, who was originally supposed to serve as a backup to Lin. The Knicks also re-acquired Marcus Camby from the Houston Rockets in a sign and trade sending Houston Josh Harrellson, Jerome Jordan, Toney Douglas and 2014 and 2015 two second-round picks and completed a sign-and-trade with the Portland Trail Blazers that brought back Raymond Felton and Kurt Thomas in exchange for Jared Jeffries, Dan Gadzuric, and the draft rights to Papanikolaou and Greek forward Georgios Printezis, whose draft rights had been acquired by the Knicks in December 2011. The Knicks also re-signed free agents J. R. Smith and Steve Novak and added more players to the roster, such as James White, Chris Copeland, and Argentinian point guard Pablo Prigioni. However the Knicks lost restricted free agents shooting guard, Landry Fields to the Toronto Raptors and point guard, Jeremy Lin to the Houston Rockets, who were both key players during the 2011–12 season. The Knicks decided not to match those teams' offers. Despite these losses, the Knicks continued to add players to the roster, signing former Chicago Bulls guard Ronnie Brewer on July 25, 2012, and signing Chris Smith, the younger brother of J. R. Smith, on August 1, 2012. It was also announced that Rasheed Wallace would come out of retirement to play for the Knicks on October 2, 2012.

Despite playing without an injured Iman Shumpert and Amar'e Stoudemire, the Knicks compiled an 18–5 record to start the season, their best start since 1993. In their first four games, they scored at least 100 points and won by double digits in all of those games. The streak ended after a 10-point loss to Memphis Grizzlies. The following Sunday, in a game against the Indiana Pacers, the Knicks at home went on to win 88–76, assuring them a 7–1 record. After two tough losses to the Dallas Mavericks and Houston Rockets, the Knicks returned home in a game against the Detroit Pistons on November 25, with a 121–100 blowout win, making them one of only three teams undefeated at home along with the Miami Heat and Utah Jazz. The Knicks finished November with an 11–4 record, their best month record since going 11–6 in March 2000.

By the All-Star break in mid-February 2013, the Knicks compiled a 32–18 record, good for second in the Eastern Conference. On February 21, on the trade deadline, the team traded Ronnie Brewer for a 2014 second-round draft pick. The Knicks then signed veteran power forward Kenyon Martin to a 10-day contract. In late March, the Knicks went on to compile a four-game losing streak, tying their worst skid of the season. They would go on and face the Jazz on the road, eventually winning the game and starting what would turn out to be a 13-game winning streak, including wins against the Miami Heat and the Oklahoma City Thunder. This was the third-longest winning streak in franchise history. On April 9, the Knicks beat the Washington Wizards to secure the Atlantic Division title for the first time since the 1993–94 NBA season. The Knicks' 13-game winning streak came to an end on April 11 as they lost to the Chicago Bulls. Despite that, they set the NBA single-season record for three-pointers. On May 3, the Knicks defeated the Boston Celtics in the first round of the NBA playoffs, 4–2, their first playoff victory since 2000. On May 18, the Knicks were eliminated in the second round of the playoffs, losing the series to the Indiana Pacers 4–2. Point guard Jason Kidd retired following the end of the season—he was named head coach of the Brooklyn Nets a few days later. In the 2013 NBA draft, the Knicks selected Tim Hardaway Jr. as the 24th pick in the first round. During the 2013 off-season, The Knicks claimed Los Angeles Lakers F Metta World Peace off of waivers. They re-signed J. R. Smith to a 3-year, $18 million deal and traded Quentin Richardson, Steve Novak, Marcus Camby, and three draft picks to acquire Andrea Bargnani from the Toronto Raptors.

=== 2013–2017: Phil Jackson era ===
The Knicks also saw changes to business operations in late 2013, replacing general manager Glen Grunwald with former MSG president Steve Mills. The Knicks also purchased an NBA D-League team located White Plains, which began operations at the start of the 2014–15 NBDL season. The Knicks then appointed former coach Phil Jackson as president of basketball operations, with Mills remaining as general manager, with the duo working directly under MSG chairman James Dolan. Following the 2013–14 season, coach Mike Woodson and his entire staff were fired, and was replaced by Derek Fisher. Fisher played under Jackson with the Los Angeles Lakers, winning five NBA championships with the franchise. The Knicks finished the season with a disappointing 37–45 record and finished ninth in the Eastern Conference, but was the season Carmelo Anthony established his career high, the Knicks' franchise record, and the Madison Square Garden record for single-game scoring. Anthony recorded 62 points and 13 rebounds in a victory against the Charlotte Bobcats.

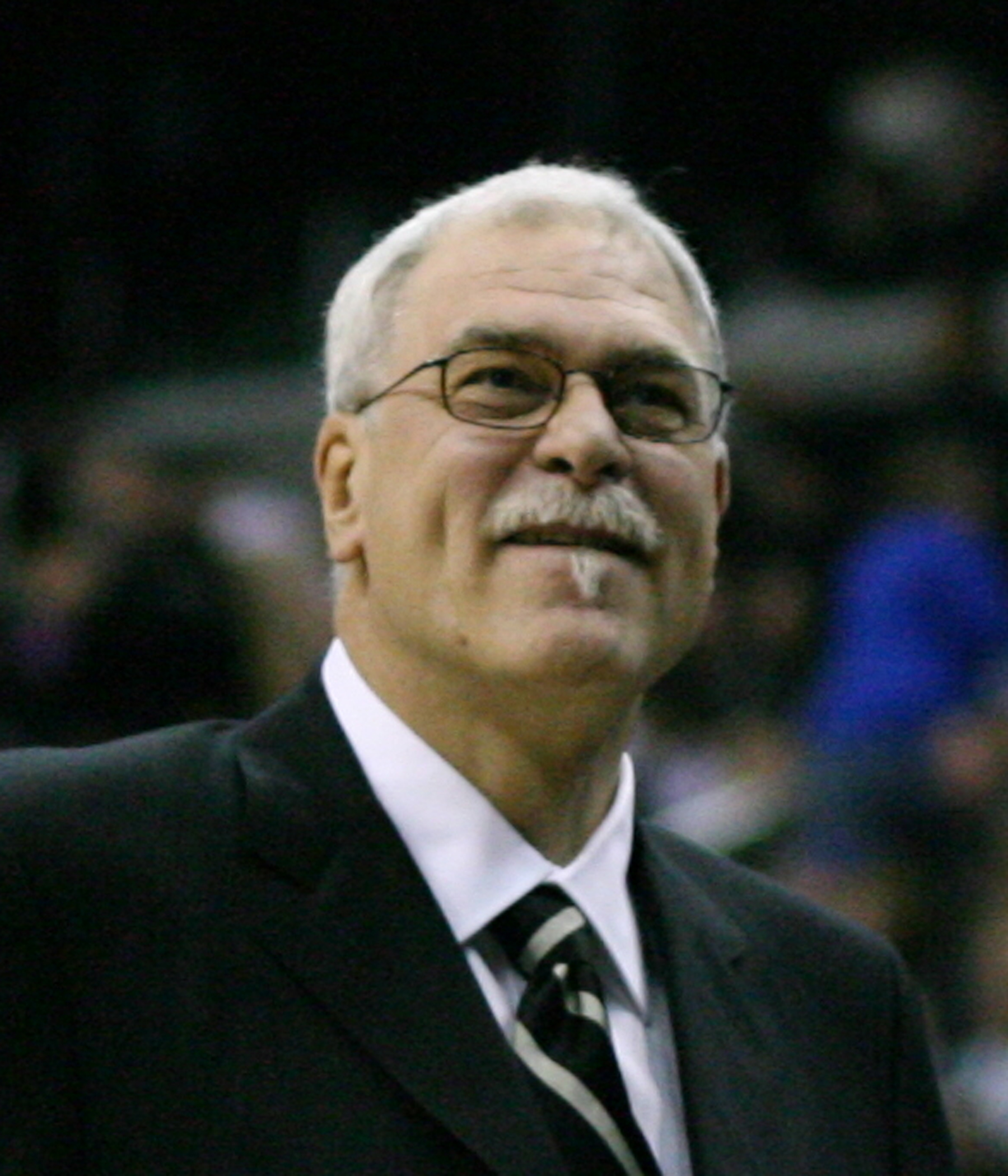
The Knicks observed their worst-ever regular season record under the stewardship of Phil Jackson, who acted as the president of the franchise from 2013 to 2017.

Forbes magazine released its franchise value rankings for NBA teams, and listed the Knicks as the world's most valuable basketball organization at $1.4 billion in 2014, edging out the Los Angeles Lakers by $50 million. The Knicks were valued at 40% more than the third-place Chicago Bulls valuation of $1 billion, and were valued nearly twice as highly as their crosstown rivals, the Brooklyn Nets, who came in at $780 million.

In the off-season, the Knicks traded controversial guard Raymond Felton, along with former NBA defensive player of the year, Tyson Chandler, to the Dallas Mavericks. In return, the Knicks received Shane Larkin, José Calderón, Samuel Dalembert, and Wayne Ellington along with two picks for the 2014 NBA draft. The trade was the first one that Jackson ever executed as a front office executive. On June 26, as part of the draft, the Knicks selected Cleanthony Early as the 34th overall pick, and Thanasis Antetokounmpo as the 51st overall pick, using the draft picks received in the trade from the Mavericks. The Knicks also acquired Louis Labeyrie, an additional second-round draft pick, in a trade with the Indiana Pacers for cash considerations.

The Knicks would then go onto set a franchise record with its 13th consecutive loss, losing 101–91 to the Washington Wizards, giving New York its longest losing streak in the franchise's 69-season history. This record was extended to 16th consecutive losses, after the NBA Global Games loss against the Milwaukee Bucks in London. The Knicks would finish the 2014–15 season with a win–loss record of 17–65, the worst record in franchise history, and allowed them to gain the fourth overall selection in the upcoming draft. The Knicks also bought out Amar'e Stoudemire's $100 million contract a season early.

On June 24, 2015, the Knicks selected Kristaps Porziņģis with the fourth overall pick in the draft, and traded Tim Hardaway Jr. to the Atlanta Hawks in exchange for Jerian Grant, the 19th overall pick. Midway through another losing season, Fisher was relieved of his coaching duties, with Kurt Rambis being named as interim head coach as the Knicks finished the season with a record of 32–50. Jeff Hornacek was then hired as their next head coach, which also oversaw Jackson's most notable acts as an executive. On June 22, former NBA MVP Derrick Rose was traded, along with Justin Holiday and a second-round pick from Chicago, to New York in exchange for Robin Lopez, José Calderón and Grant. The Knicks also signed Joakim Noah, Brandon Jennings, and Courtney Lee to contracts worth a combined $127 million, and regressed the following season, causing the franchise to part ways with Jackson after three years as the Knicks' president of basketball operations. Under Jackson's presidency, the Knicks had gone 80–166, suffered three consecutive losing seasons, and missed three consecutive playoffs.

In his last act prior to leaving the Knicks, Jackson selected Frank Ntilikina with the eighth overall pick, Damyean Dotson with the 44th overall pick, and Ognjen Jaramaz with the 58th overall pick in the 2017 NBA draft.

=== 2017–2020: Further struggles ===
Following Jackson's departure, the Knicks appointed Scott Perry as general manager and named Steve Mills president of basketball operations. The Knicks also saw Carmelo Anthony demanding a trade from the team, which posed difficulty for both player and franchise due to a no-trade clause inserted in Anthony's contract given by Jackson in 2013. Originally, the only teams for which he would waive his no-trade clause were for the Cleveland Cavaliers and the Houston Rockets, with the former eventually removed from trade discussions due to internal conflicts. Anthony intended to join the Rockets, with a three-way trade with the Portland Trail Blazers set up involving Ryan Anderson. Anderson's three-year, $60 million contract was not feasibly able to be absorbed by either franchise, however, causing Perry to cease talks with the Rockets, before agreeing to a deal with the Oklahoma City Thunder, after Anthony agreed to expand his no-trade clause to include the Thunder. The Knicks received Enes Kanter, Doug McDermott and a 2018 second-round pick in exchange for Anthony on September 25, 2017, while also positioning Kristaps Porziņģis as the new centerpiece of the franchise.

The Knicks also re-signed Tim Hardaway Jr. to a four-year, $71 million contract, while also agreeing to a one-year, minimum contract with Michael Beasley. The franchise also traded for former lottery pick Emmanuel Mudiay from the Denver Nuggets at the trade deadline, who was a point guard the Knicks were rumored to have targeted prior to selecting Porziņģis in 2015. The trade also included the Dallas Mavericks, with Dallas acquiring McDermott from the Knicks, and the Nuggets obtaining Devin Harris from Dallas. However, the season again ended poorly, with 29–53 record to leave the Knicks as the 11th seed in the Eastern Conference. This caused the Knicks to part ways with head coach Jeff Hornacek. Hornacek's two full seasons retained criticism for the team's continued struggle on defense, as well as the inability to implement an efficient, modern offense. He was replaced with former Memphis Grizzlies head coach David Fizdale. Fizdale signed a four-year deal, and was tasked to deliver on player development and improving the team's basketball philosophy.

On May 15, 2018, the Knicks were awarded the ninth overall pick in the 2018 NBA draft, and selected Kevin Knox II from the Kentucky. The team also acquired Mitchell Robinson with the 36th overall pick, and signed former lottery pick Mario Hezonja. They further invested in untapped potential by signing another former lottery pick, with Noah Vonleh agreeing to a one-year deal. However, following a dismal start to the 2018–19 season, and after a meeting with Porziņģis gave team officials the impression that he wanted to be traded, Porziņģis was traded on January 30, 2019, alongside Trey Burke, Courtney Lee and Tim Hardaway Jr., to the Dallas Mavericks in exchange for DeAndre Jordan, Wesley Matthews, Dennis Smith Jr., an unprotected 2021 first-round draft pick, and an additional top-ten protected 2023 first-round draft pick. The Knicks finished the 2018–19 season with a league worst 17–65 regular season record, but the season was notable for the emergence of undrafted rookie Allonzo Trier, as well as for the progression of Dotson and Robinson. The Knicks won the third overall pick in the 2019 NBA draft, and selected RJ Barrett from Duke. The team also traded for forward Iggy Brazdeikis, who was drafted in the second round from Michigan.

In preparation for the 2019–20 season, and as a result of having a record $74 million in cap space following the Porziņģis trade, the team divided it among five new signings. The Knicks agreed terms with veteran role players Wayne Ellington and Taj Gibson, with forward Bobby Portis also signing. The team then signed former lottery picks Elfrid Payton and Julius Randle. On February 4, 2020, the Knicks fired Steve Mills after seven seasons as president with Scott Perry taking over on an interim basis.

=== 2020–2022: Moderate success ===
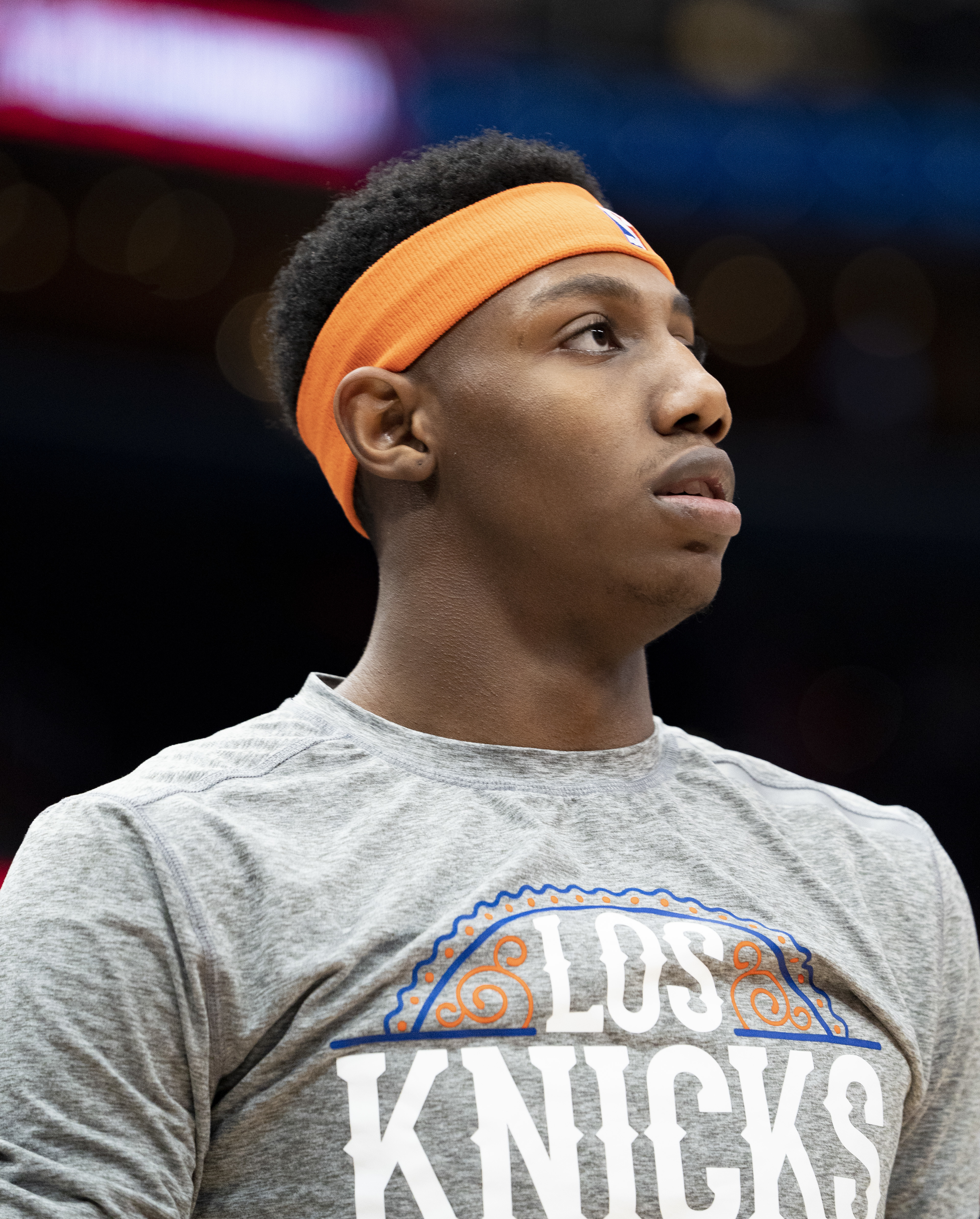
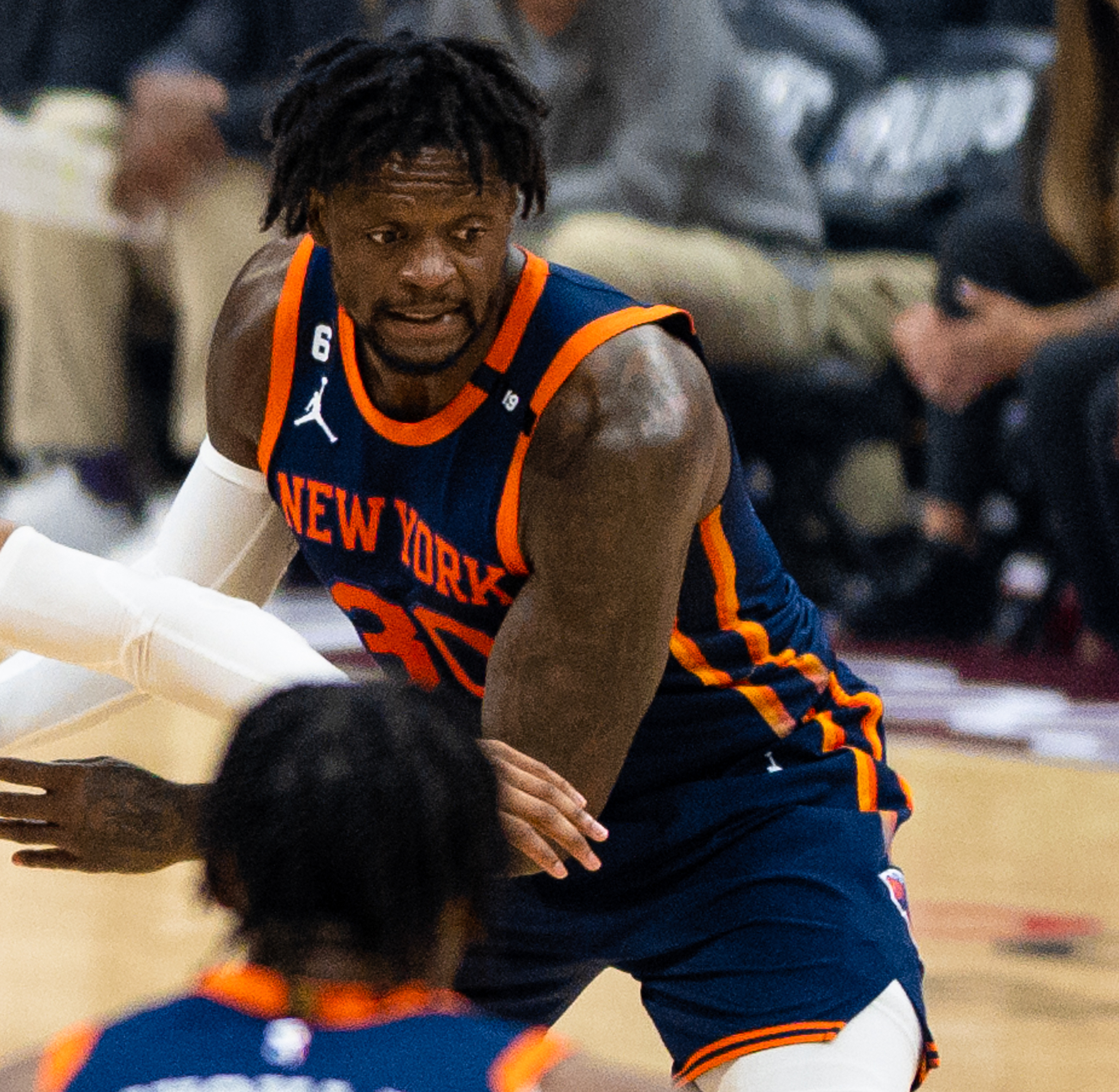
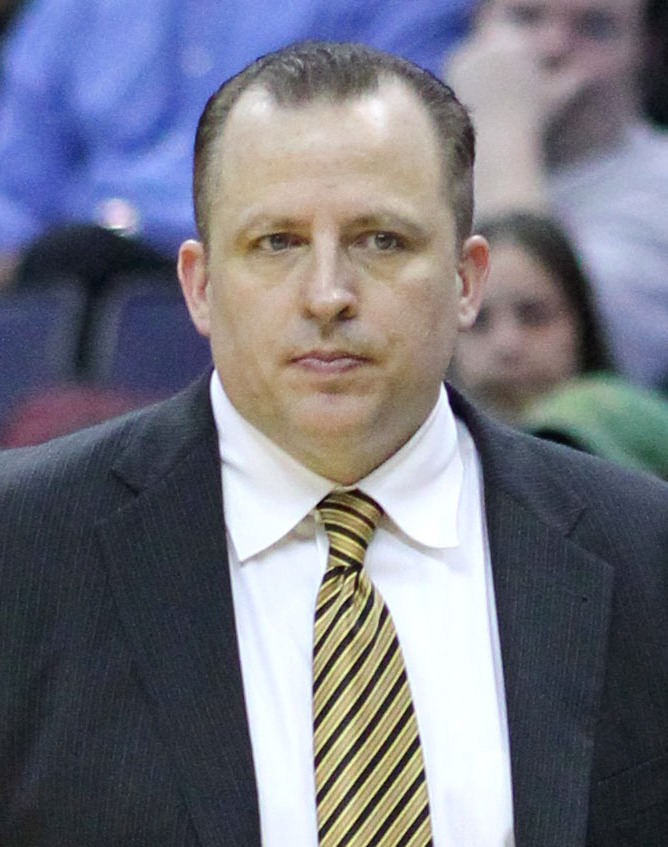
2019 third overall pick guard RJ Barrett, 2021 All-NBA Second Team forward and Most Improved Player Julius Randle, and Coach of the Year Tom Thibodeau led the Knicks to a surprisingly successful 41–31 record in 2020–21 and their first playoff berth in years.

On March 2, 2020, Leon Rose was named president of the team. On July 30, the Knicks announced that they hired Tom Thibodeau as their head coach. Julius Randle had a breakout season and, on February 23, 2021, Randle was named as a reserve for the 2021 NBA All-Star Game. On May 3, with a 118–104 win over the Memphis Grizzlies, the Knicks clinched their first winning season since the 2012–13 season.

On May 12, the Knicks clinched their first playoff appearance since 2013, ending their eight-year playoff drought. At the end of the regular season, Randle was named NBA Most Improved Player, while Thibodeau was named the NBA Coach of the Year, becoming the first Knicks head coach since Pat Riley in 1992–93 to receive the award. The Knicks faced the Atlanta Hawks in the first round of the 2021 NBA playoffs as the fourth seed, losing in five games. Fan attendance in home games during the 2020–21 season was prohibited until February 23, 2021, per an executive order of Governor of New York Andrew Cuomo. The Knicks reopened Madison Square Garden to spectators on February 23.

In the 2021 off-season, the Knicks retained much of their old talent, while bringing in former all-star guard Kemba Walker and forward Evan Fournier. Additionally, after Randle's breakthrough season, the Knicks extended his contract for four years in August 2021. On January 13, 2022, the Knicks traded former eighth overall pick of the 2018 NBA draft, Kevin Knox II and a protected future first-round pick in exchange for former 10th overall pick of the 2019 NBA draft, Cam Reddish, Solomon Hill and a 2025 second-round draft pick and cash considerations. During the 2021–22 season, the Knicks struggled regressed finishing 11th in the Eastern Conference with a 37–45 record. Randle took a step back having a down season across the boards and his shooting percentages took a hit that resulted in fans booing Randle and increased trade rumours, and the lack of leadership of Randle was questioned, along with attitude and desire to be a Knick. Head coach Thibodeau was questioned if he was the right coach for the Knicks heading onwards. The signings of guard Kemba Walker and forward Evan Fournier were considered extreme failures that set the Knicks back as well. The third overall pick of the 2019 NBA draft, RJ Barrett in his third season averaged 20.0 points, 5.8 rebounds and 3.0 assists.

=== 2022–present: The Jalen Brunson era ===
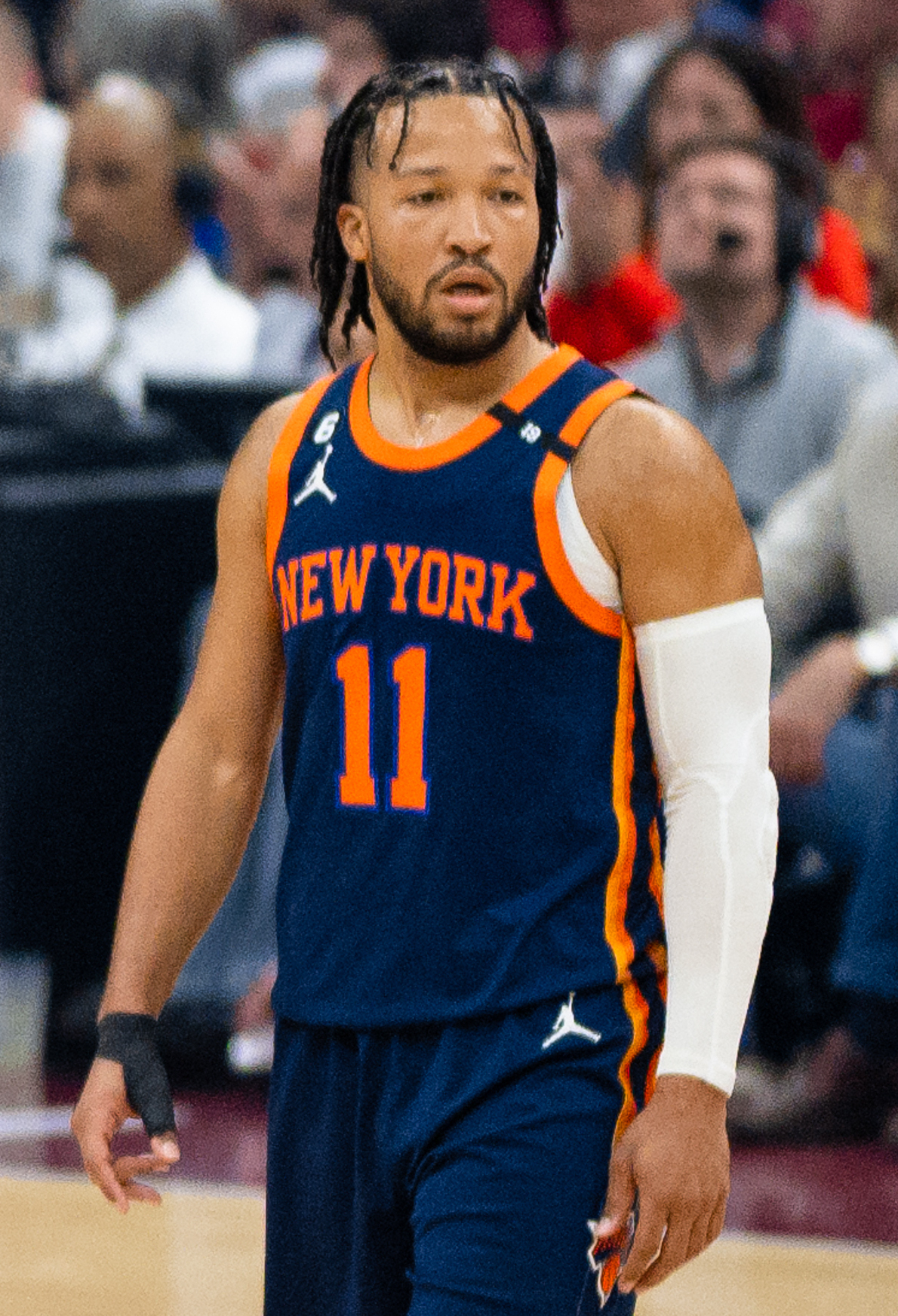
Jalen Brunson signed with the Knicks in 2022.

The 2022 off-season brought a lot of change to the Knicks' roster. During the 2022 NBA draft, the Knicks traded Alec Burks, Nerlens Noel and Kemba Walker to the Detroit Pistons to clear cap space for the free agency period, as well as trading their 11th overall pick for protected future first-round picks. On July 12, 2022, the Knicks signed point guard Jalen Brunson to a four-year contract, with hopes he could bring some much-needed stability to the position. The Knicks completed the 2022–23 season with a 47–35 record, finishing in fifth place in the Eastern Conference. Randle represented the Knicks in the 2023 NBA All-Star Game. In the first round of the 2023 playoffs, the Knicks defeated the Cleveland Cavaliers in five games, their first playoff series win since 2013. They were then defeated 4–2 by the Miami Heat in the second round.

In 2024, the Knicks saw Brunson and Randle represent them at the NBA All-Star Game. The team finished with 50 wins and secured the second seed, with a first round matchup against the Philadelphia 76ers. The Knicks defeated the 76ers in six games, before falling short in seven games against the Indiana Pacers. During the 2024 off-season, the Knicks traded away Julius Randle, Donte DiVincenzo and Keita Bates-Diop to the Minnesota Timberwolves in exchange for Karl-Anthony Towns. The 2024–25 season marked the best regular season for the Knicks since the 2012–13 season as they clinched a playoff spot following their victory against the Milwaukee Bucks. In the first round, the Knicks defeated the Detroit Pistons in six games, and in the conference semifinals would dethrone the defending NBA champion Boston Celtics to advance to the Eastern Conference finals for the first time since 2000. However, they were defeated in six games by the Indiana Pacers.

==== 2025–26: End of championship drought ====
On June 3, 2025, the Knicks fired head coach Tom Thibodeau. Mike Brown was later hired by the Knicks on July 7, as their new head coach. In the 2025–26 season, the Knicks won the 2025 NBA Cup title after defeating the San Antonio Spurs in the championship game. Jalen Brunson was named the NBA Cup MVP. They ended their regular season with a 53–29 record, a modest improvement from the previous season and placing third in the Eastern Conference. In the first round of the 2026 playoffs, the Knicks defeated the Atlanta Hawks in six games and capped off with a 140–89 victory on April 30. They would go on to sweep the Philadelphia 76ers in the conference semifinals, and the Cleveland Cavaliers in the conference finals to advance to the NBA Finals for the first time since 1999.

Facing against the Western Conference champion San Antonio Spurs, the Knicks won Games 1 and 2 on the road before losing Game 3 at Madison Square Garden. They responded by overcoming a 29-point deficit in Game 4 to complete the largest single-game comeback in NBA Finals history, before winning Game 5 to claim their first NBA championship in 53 years. Jalen Brunson received the NBA Finals Most Valuable Player Award. With only three playoff game losses, the Knicks tied with the 2023–24 Boston Celtics for the third-best playoff run behind the 2000–01 Los Angeles Lakers (15–1) and 2016–17 Golden State Warriors (16–1), and their 13-consecutive win streak ranks as the second-longest playoff win streak in NBA history, also behind the 2016–17 Warriors.

== Season-by-season record ==
List of the last five seasons completed by the Knicks. For the full season-by-season history, see List of New York Knicks seasons.

Note: GP = Games played, W = Wins, L = Losses, W–L% = Winning percentage

Season	GP	W	L	W–L%	Finish	Playoffs
2021–22	82	37	45	.451	5th, Atlantic	Did not qualify
2022–23	82	47	35	.573	3rd, Atlantic	Lost in conference semifinals, 2–4 (Heat)
2023–24	82	50	32	.610	2nd, Atlantic	Lost in conference semifinals, 3–4 (Pacers)
2024–25	82	51	31	.622	2nd, Atlantic	Lost in conference finals, 2–4 (Pacers)
2025–26	82	53	29	.646	2nd, Atlantic	NBA champions, 4–1 (Spurs)

== Logos and uniforms ==
=== 1946–1964: Father Knickerbocker ===
The first logo of the New York Knicks is of a character named "Father Knickerbocker" dribbling a basketball, in the iconic blue and orange colors. It was designed by New York World-Telegram cartoonist Willard Mullin. From the beginning, the Knicks home uniforms are in white with blue and orange trim, while the away uniforms are in blue with orange and white trim. The first iterations contain monotone lettering in blue (home) and orange (away) lettering, with the addition of a checkerboard pattern during the mid-1950s.

=== 1964–1992: Classic roundball ===
The Knicks would introduce an iconic logo that would endure for the next three decades. Designed by Bud Freeman, the word "Knicks" superimposed over a brown basketball is known as the "classic roundball logo", with minor changes throughout its lifespan such as maroon wordmark and orange basketball. An alternate logo featuring the full team name inside an orange basketball was used during the late 1960s and into the 1970s. As the 1960s began, the Knicks updated their uniforms again. This time the lettering is in serifed fonts, and the blue lettering and numbers on the home uniforms are now trimmed in orange. The away uniforms maintained the orange lettering but added white trim; it later changed to white letters while adding white trim on the piping. Side stripes were also added to the uniform. The "NY" monogram is on the left leg of the shorts.

==== 1968–1979; 1983–1997: Championship era uniforms ====
The Knicks unveiled a uniform that would stay for three decades. This uniform, with an arched "NEW YORK" in serif lettering and in orange, would be the uniform worn during their 1970 and 1973 championship seasons; however, they were not introduced simultaneously. The home uniforms would debut in 1968, while the away uniforms debuted the following year. One noticeable feature was that the player's name was in a straight block arched lettering (which is also called the "vertical arch" style), which was meticulously designed by Gerry Cosby and his sporting goods company. The unusual arrangement on the player's name was later adopted by several Major League Baseball teams in the 1970s, and are currently used by the National Hockey League's Colorado Avalanche, Detroit Red Wings and New York Rangers. On the shorts, there was no logo placed during much of the 1970s, but during the 1978–79 season, the side stripes were eliminated and the interlocking "NY" logo inside an apple was placed instead. When this uniform style was reinstated for the 1983–84 season, it now featured the player's number and the interlocking "NY" logo (similar to the "NY" on the iconic New York Yankees pinstripe uniform) on the shorts, in addition to the return of the side stripes. After the 1986–87 season, the shorts number was removed, then in the 1991–92 season, the "roundball logo" replaced the "NY" and player names became serifed and arranged in a radial arch. The final iteration saw the Knicks adopt the "black-accented triangle" logo for the 1992–93 season, replacing the previous "roundball logo", which was slightly tweaked to add "NEW YORK" above the logo for the 1995–96 season.

==== 1979–1983: Crimson red era uniforms ====
The Knicks radically changed their uniforms prior to the 1979–80 season. Royal blue and orange were replaced by navy and crimson red. During this period, the home uniforms featured the team name below the number, both in crimson red with navy trim and in a stylized, free-flowing font. Navy away uniforms continue to feature the city name but below the white and crimson red number. The interlocking "NY" logo debuted on the shorts, with the addition of player numbers and side stripes during the 1981–82 season.

The change to crimson red and navy was initiated by then-team president E. Michael Burke, whose alma mater University of Pennsylvania wore those colors.

The "Knicks" script from the "crimson red era" uniforms was later reused in the uniforms of the Knicks' NBA Development League affiliate Westchester Knicks, with the same team name below the number format, though it was soon changed to a variation of the triangle logo.

=== 1992–2012: Black-accented triangle ===
Before the 1992–93 season, the Knicks updated their "roundball logo" to its present form, with the word "Knicks" in a futuristic font, again superimposed over a basketball, with a silver triangle accentuating the look. The "new look" logo was designed by Michael Doret and overseen by Tom O'Grady. For the 1995–96 season, the city name in a futuristic script was added atop the logo, while an alternate subway-token logo featuring the acronym "NYK" was introduced. Black was also introduced as an accent color. The logo was added while the "championship era" uniforms were still in use, but during the 1995–96 season, the Knicks unveiled a blue alternate uniform, this time featuring black side panels and the aforementioned "subway token" logo on the shorts' beltline. A home white version of this uniform was introduced for the 1997–98 season, effectively retiring the championship era uniforms. In the 2001–02 season, the side stripes were narrowed, while the "subway token" logo was moved to the back of the uniform, and the Knicks primary logo moved from the side to the front of the shorts.

=== 2012–present: Modified triangle ===
The Knicks updated their "new look logo", this time eliminating the color black from the scheme. They still used the previous uniform during the 2011–12 season, but for the 2012–13 season, the Knicks unveiled new uniforms inspired from their "championship era" uniforms. A more subtle and bolder "New York" script was introduced, while the uniform piping stopped until the lettering. The phrase Once A Knick, Always A Knick is added on the uniform collar. Gray became the accent color. In addition, an updated version of their 1970s secondary logo, this time featuring only the team name, was introduced.

On October 25, 2013, the Knicks unveiled an alternate orange uniform, which is essentially a mirror image of the blue away uniforms, but with orange as the primary color and blue and white as trim colors. The uniforms debuted on October 31 in a road game against the Chicago Bulls, and were used in the first five weekend home games, but after going 0–6 in the orange uniforms, they were discontinued permanently.

Beginning with the 2017–18 season, Nike became the NBA's new uniform provider. Under Nike, "home" and "away" uniform designations were eliminated, and in their place were the white "Association" set, primary color "Icon" set, alternate color "Statement" set, and annual "City" set that were used either at home or away. The Knicks kept their white "Association" and blue "icon" uniforms almost intact with only a few alterations such as truncated shoulder and shorts striping and the modern roundball logo on the waistband.

From 2017 to 2019, the Knicks' "statement" uniform featured a white base with lettering in orange with white and blue trim. The striping was inspired from the team's 1970s-era uniforms. In the 2019–20 season, the Knicks changed their Statement uniform to a blue base and white lettering with blue and orange trim. The white letters were a nod to the team's 1960s blue uniforms. As with the previous "statement" uniform, the striping was based on the team's 1970s uniforms. Before the 2022–23 season, the "statement" uniform was again changed, this time with a navy base and orange gradient striping. The 1995–2011 "New Look" logo was placed on either side of the shorts. Letters are orange with blue trim.

In the 2025–26 season, the Knicks changed their "statement" uniform, going with a black base with orange and blue gradient stripes. The aforementioned gradient stripes were a nod to Madison Square Garden's iconic lighting.

=== Special uniforms ===
The Knicks have also worn special edition uniforms every March as part of the NBA's Noche Latina events and during St. Patrick's Day. The uniforms during Noche Latina were originally white with blue and orange trim, first using the 2001–12 uniform from 2008 to 2012, and then the current uniforms from 2012 to 2015, the only exception being Nueva York in front. In the 2015–16 season, the Knicks used a variation of their away blue uniform for Noche Latina. The Saint Patrick's Day uniforms used the road uniform template except for green substituting for the blue base. These uniforms have also been used on Christmas Day from the 2009–10 season, and was worn in particular by Nate Robinson for a "Kryptonate vs. Superman" theme against Dwight Howard in the 2009 Slam Dunk Contest. The St. Patrick's uniforms were shelved after the 2011–12 season.

On Christmas Day 2012, the Knicks wore monochrome uniforms known as "big color". The uniforms are mostly orange, with blue trimming. The following year, the Knicks wore sleeved orange uniforms known as "big logo", featuring a chrome-treated Knicks logo in front. For the 2014 edition, the Knicks wore a variation of their home uniforms, featuring the team logo in front and the player's first name in a blue nameplate below the number. The 2016 Christmas Day game against the Celtics saw the Knicks wear an all-blue uniform without additional striping, complete with fancy scripted orange lettering and numbers.

As part of its deal with Nike, a special "city" uniform would be used to pay tribute to either local culture or team traditions. The Knicks' 2017–18 "city" uniform, which is navy with orange and grey trim and features an emblem containing the team name, uniform number, a ladder with a silhouette of a firefighter, a fire hydrant, and the abbreviation "N.Y.C." for New York City, pays homage to the city's firefighters and their families. It was designed in collaboration with the Knicks, the NBA, Nike and the Uniformed Firefighters Association.

The Knicks' second "city" uniform is also in navy and features white lettering, a straight aligned "New York" wordmark in front and alternating stripes of blue, navy and orange designed to mimic the New York City skyline. The blue and orange arm striping was inspired from the team's 1950s uniforms. The Knicks initially debuted the uniform in the 2018–19 season, and was retained the following season.

The Knicks' 2020–21 "city" uniform is designed in collaboration with Kith. The uniform is predominantly black with blue and orange side gradients. The roundel in front features both the full team name and the "city never sleeps" nickname in a white, blue and orange gradient, and white numbers with blue drop shadows are added inside. The "NYC" acronym in black and white trim is placed within the Nike mark.

The Knicks' 2021–22 "city" uniform featured another collaboration with Kith. The predominantly black uniform featured the classic "New York" wordmark in white with orange trim, and orange numbers with white trim. Those elements, along with the 1992 "New Look" logo on the waist, paid tribute to the 1995–2001 blue uniforms. Along the side, black and gray checkerboard stripes were an homage to the 1950s set. A silhouette of the classic Madison Square Garden logo was added to the side stripes on the shorts. This design was revisited for the 2025–26 season, but was "remixed" to closely resemble the 1997–2001 white uniform minus the black accents. The original black version returned for the 2026–27 season.

Another Kith-collaborated "city" uniform was released in the 2022–23 season. This design was inspired by the blue uniforms they wore from 1995 to 2001, but with black as the base color.

The 2023–24 "City" uniform, again under a collaboration with Kith, was yet another nod to the late 1990s–early 2000s uniform design. In a first for the franchise, dark blue pinstripes were added to the blue-based uniform, and two "New York" wordmarks in both white and orange were layered twice on the top, in a nod to the iconic saying "the city so nice, they named it twice." Black and orange side stripes were also featured. This uniform, albeit in white, was reused as part of the 2024–25 "City" uniform.

In the 2026–27 season, the Knicks wore special uniforms in the opening game at the Madison Square Garden against the Philadelphia 76ers to commemorate the previous season's championship. The jerseys featured a "Champions" patch above the player's last names, gold lettering and gold numbers. "Champs" was also embroidered in script on the jersey.

=== Throwback uniforms ===
The Knicks were one of several NBA teams to wear throwback uniforms during the league's 50th anniversary in the 1996–97 season. The throwback set they wore that season represented the franchise's first season in 1946–47. However, both the blue and white throwbacks featured blue letters with orange trim (the originals had only orange letters on the blue uniform and blue letters on the white uniform minus any additional trim).

In the 2004–05 season, the Knicks wore throwback white uniforms from the "maroon era" of the early 1980s. The only difference from the originals was that the letters on the player's name were arranged in a radial arch (the originals were designed in a vertical arch) and were smaller in size.

The following season, the Knicks wore throwback blue checkerboard uniforms from the mid-1950s, which featured the "Father Knickerbocker" logo on the left leg (the originals did not feature said logo).

For the 2007–08 season, the Knicks wore their classic white uniforms as a tribute to the early 1970s championship teams. As with the "maroon era" throwbacks, the player's name no longer appeared in a vertical arch and were smaller in size. In addition, the original "roundball" logo was added (the original uniforms had no logo on the shorts).

The 2010–11 season saw the Knicks wear the blue uniforms to commemorate the 40th anniversary of the 1969–70 championship team. However, the design they wore that season faithfully replicated those of the 1991–92 Knicks team, complete with radially-arched serifed block letters on the player's name and the "roundball" logo on the shorts. In the original version, the shorts had no logo while the player name is arranged in a vertical arch and in a sans-serif block font.

In the 2015–16 season, the Knicks wore throwback white versions of the mid-1950s checkerboard uniforms in commemoration of the franchise's 70th season.

In the 2021–22 season, the Knicks, along with the Celtics and Warriors were one of three teams to wear a "classic edition" uniform to commemorate each franchise and the NBA's 75th anniversary. The Knicks design harkened back to the original white uniforms from 1946, complete with enlarged blue numbers, blue waistbands, and blue and orange side stripes.

== Personnel ==
=== Current roster ===
New York Knicks roster
Players

Pos.	No.	Player	Height	Weight	DOB	From
PG	14	Jaden Akins (TW)	6 ft 2 in (1.88 m)	195 lb (88 kg)	2003-02-25	Michigan State
G	5	Jose Alvarado	6 ft 0 in (1.83 m)	179 lb (81 kg)	1998-04-12	Georgia Tech
G/F	8	OG Anunoby	6 ft 7 in (2.01 m)	240 lb (109 kg)	1997-07-17	Indiana
G/F	25	Mikal Bridges	6 ft 6 in (1.98 m)	209 lb (95 kg)	1996-08-30	Villanova
G	11	Jalen Brunson	6 ft 2 in (1.88 m)	190 lb (86 kg)	1996-08-31	Villanova
G	00	Jordan Clarkson	6 ft 5 in (1.96 m)	194 lb (88 kg)	1992-06-07	Missouri
F	4	Pacôme Dadiet	6 ft 9 in (2.06 m)	210 lb (95 kg)	2005-07-27	France
F	51	Mohamed Diawara	6 ft 9 in (2.06 m)	225 lb (102 kg)	2005-04-29	France
C	0	Andre Drummond	6 ft 10 in (2.08 m)	279 lb (127 kg)	1993-08-10	Connecticut
G	3	Josh Hart	6 ft 5 in (1.96 m)	215 lb (98 kg)	1995-03-06	Villanova
F	1	Dalton Knecht (TW)	6 ft 6 in (1.98 m)	215 lb (98 kg)	2001-04-19	Tennessee
G	13	Tyler Kolek	6 ft 2 in (1.88 m)	195 lb (88 kg)	2001-03-27	Marquette
G	2	Miles McBride	6 ft 2 in (1.88 m)	195 lb (88 kg)	2000-09-08	West Virginia
F	55	Tyler Nickel (TW)	6 ft 7 in (2.01 m)	220 lb (100 kg)	2003-09-05	Vanderbilt
G	44	Landry Shamet	6 ft 5 in (1.96 m)	190 lb (86 kg)	1997-03-13	Wichita State
F/C	32	Karl-Anthony Towns	7 ft 0 in (2.13 m)	248 lb (112 kg)	1995-11-15	Kentucky
C	35	James Wiseman	7 ft 0 in (2.13 m)	240 lb (109 kg)	2001-03-31	Memphis

Coaches
Head coach
- Mike Brown
Assistant(s)
- Charles Allen
- Rick Brunson
- Mark Bryant
- Maurice Cheeks
- Darren Erman
- Riccardo Fois
- Chris Jent (associate HC)
- Billy Lange
- Brendan O'Connor

Legend
- (DP) Unsigned draft pick
- (FA) Free agent
- (S) Suspended
- (GL) On assignment to G League affiliate
- (TW) Two-way affiliate player
- Injured

Roster
Updated: October 23, 2026

=== Retained draft rights ===
The Knicks hold the draft rights to the following unsigned draft picks who have been playing outside the NBA. A drafted player, either an international draftee or a college draftee who is not signed by the team that drafted him, is allowed to sign with any non-NBA teams. In this case, the team retains the player's draft rights in the NBA until one year after the player's contract with the non-NBA team ends. This list includes draft rights that were acquired from trades with other teams.

Draft	Round	Pick	Player	Pos.	Nationality	Current team	Note(s)	Ref
2023	2	31	James Nnaji	C	Nigeria	Free agent	Acquired from the Detroit Pistons (via Charlotte)	
2021	2	34	Rokas Jokubaitis	G	Lithuania	FC Bayern Munich (Germany)	Acquired from the Oklahoma City Thunder	
2017	2	50	Mathias Lessort	C	France	Panathinaikos AKTOR Athens (Greece)	Acquired from the Philadelphia 76ers (via LA Clippers and Minnesota)	
2017	2	58	Ognjen Jaramaz	G	Serbia	Cedevita Olimpija (Slovenia)		
2016	2	57	Wang Zhelin	C	China	Shanghai Sharks (China)	Acquired from the Memphis Grizzlies (via LA Lakers)	
2015	2	39	Juan Pablo Vaulet	F	Argentina	Movistar Estudiantes (Spain)	Acquired from the Indiana Pacers (via Brooklyn and Charlotte)	
2015	2	57	Nikola Radičević	G	Serbia	Dziki Warsaw (Poland)	Acquired from the Denver Nuggets (via Detroit)	
2010	2	48	Latavious Williams	F	United States	Al-Ittihad Jeddah (Saudi Arabia)	Acquired from the Miami Heat (via Oklahoma City and New Orleans)	
2009	2	34	Sergio Llull	G	Spain	Real Madrid (Spain)	Acquired from the Denver Nuggets (via Houston)	
2009	2	57	Emir Preldžić	G/F	Turkey	Orlovik Žepče (Bosnia and Herzegovina)	Acquired from the Phoenix Suns (via Cleveland, Washington, Dallas, Indiana, Toronto and Philadelphia)	

=== Retired numbers ===
New York Knicks retired numbers
No.	Player	Position	Tenure	Date
10	Walt Frazier ^{1}	G	1967–1977	December 15, 1979
12	Dick Barnett	G	1965–1973	March 10, 1990
15 ^{5}	Earl Monroe	G	1971–1980	March 1, 1986
15 ^{5}	Dick McGuire ^{2}	G	1949–1957	March 14, 1992
19	Willis Reed ^{3}	C	1964–1974	October 21, 1976
22	Dave DeBusschere	F	1969–1974	March 24, 1981
24	Bill Bradley	F	1967–1977	February 18, 1984
33	Patrick Ewing	C	1985–2000	February 28, 2003
613	Red Holzman ^{4}	—	1967–1977; 1978–1982	March 10, 1990

Notes:

- ^{1} Also served as a broadcaster.
- ^{2} Also served as head coach (1965–1968) and scouting director.
- ^{3} Also served as head coach (1977–1978).
- ^{4} As head coach; the number represents his 613 victories coaching the Knicks.
- ^{5} Number retired twice, first for Monroe and six years later for McGuire.
- The NBA retired Bill Russell's No. 6 for all its member teams on August 11, 2022.

=== Basketball Hall of Famers ===
Players
No.	Name	Position	Tenure	Inducted	No.	Name	Position	Tenure	Inducted
6	Tom Gola	G/F	1962–1966	1976	32	Jerry Lucas ^{1}	C	1971–1974	1980
7	Slater Martin	G	1956	1982	19	Willis Reed	C	1964–1974	1982
24	Bill Bradley	F/G	1967–1977	1982	22	Dave DeBusschere	F	1969–1974	1983
10	Walt Frazier	G	1967–1977	1987	15; 21; 33	Earl Monroe	G	1972–1980	1990
11	Harry Gallatin ^{2}	F/C	1948–1957	1991	15	Dick McGuire	G	1949–1957	1993
8	Walt Bellamy ^{3}	C	1965–1968	1993	11	Bob McAdoo	F/C	1976–1979	2000
33	Patrick Ewing ^{4}	C	1985–2000	2008	9	Richie Guerin	G	1956–1963	2013
30	Bernard King	F	1982–1987	2013	8; 19	Nathaniel Clifton	F	1950–1956	2014
42	Spencer Haywood	F/C	1975–1979	2015	55	Dikembe Mutombo	C	2003–2004	2015
3	Tracy McGrady	G/F	2010	2017	1	Maurice Cheeks	G	1990–1991	2018
5	Jason Kidd ^{5}	G	2012–2013	2018	4	Carl Braun ^{6}	G	1947–1950; 1952–1961	2019
44	Paul Westphal	G	1981–1983	2019	12	Dick Barnett	G	1965–1973	2024
4	Chauncey Billups	G	2011	2024	7	Carmelo Anthony ^{7}	F	2011–2017	2025
1	Amar'e Stoudemire	F/C	2010–2015	2026					

Coaches
Name		Position	Tenure	Inducted	Name	Position	Tenure	Inducted
613	Red Holzman	Head coach	1967–1977; 1978–1982	1986	Lenny Wilkens ^{8}	Head coach	2004–2005	1998
Larry Brown		Head coach	2005–2006	2002	Pat Riley	Head coach	1991–1995	2008
Don Nelson		Head coach	1995–1996	2012	Rick Pitino ^{9}	Head coach	1987–1989	2013

Contributors
Name	Position	Tenure	Inducted	Name	Position	Tenure	Inducted
Ned Irish	Founder/President	1946–1974	1964	Hubie Brown	Head coach	1982–1986	2005
Mike D'Antoni ^{10}	Head coach	2008–2012	2026				

Notes:

- ^{1} In total, Lucas was inducted into the Hall of Fame twice – as player and as a member of the 1960 Olympic team.
- ^{2} Also served as head coach (1965–1966).
- ^{3} In total, Bellamy was inducted into the Hall of Fame twice – as player and as a member of the 1960 Olympic team.
- ^{4} In total, Ewing was inducted into the Hall of Fame twice – as player and as a member of the 1992 Olympic team.
- ^{5} In total, Kidd was inducted into the Hall of Fame twice – as player and as a member of the 2008 Olympic team.
- ^{6} Also served as head coach (1959–1961).
- ^{7} In total, Anthony was inducted into the Hall of Fame twice – as player and as a member of the 2008 Olympic team.
- ^{8} In total, Wilkens was inducted into the Hall of Fame three times – as player, as coach and as a member of the 1992 Olympic team.
- ^{9} Also served as assistant coach (1983–1985).
- ^{10} In total, D'Antoni was inducted into the Hall of Fame twice – as contributor and as a member of the 2008 Olympic team.

=== All-Star Game selections ===
The following Knicks players were selected to the NBA All-Star Game.

- Vince Boryla – 1951
- Harry Gallatin – 1951–1957
- Dick McGuire – 1951, 1952, 1954, 1955, 1956
- Max Zaslofsky – 1952
- Carl Braun – 1953–1957
- Nathaniel Clifton – 1957
- Richie Guerin – 1958–1963
- Willie Naulls – 1958, 1960, 1961, 1962
- Ken Sears – 1958, 1959
- Johnny Green – 1962, 1963, 1965
- Tom Gola – 1963, 1964
- Len Chappell – 1964
- Willis Reed – 1965–1971
- Dick Barnett – 1968
- Dave DeBusschere – 1966, 1967, 1968, 1970–1974
- Walt Frazier – 1970–1976
- Bill Bradley – 1973
- Earl Monroe – 1975, 1977
- Bob McAdoo – 1977, 1978
- Bill Cartwright – 1980
- Micheal Ray Richardson – 1980, 1981, 1982
- Bernard King – 1984, 1985
- Patrick Ewing – 1986, 1988–1997
- Mark Jackson – 1989
- Charles Oakley – 1994
- John Starks – 1994
- Allan Houston – 2000, 2001
- Latrell Sprewell – 2001
- David Lee – 2010
- Amar'e Stoudemire – 2011
- Carmelo Anthony – 2012–2017
- Tyson Chandler – 2013
- Kristaps Porziņģis – 2018
- Julius Randle – 2021, 2023, 2024
- Jalen Brunson – 2024, 2025, 2026
- Karl-Anthony Towns – 2025, 2026

== Staff ==
=== Management ===
Steve Mills served as general manager and president during the 2013–14 season. At the end of the 2013–14 season Phil Jackson replaced Mills as team's president. He was reinstated as president in 2017, with Scott Perry replacing him as general manager.

Team presidents

All-time team presidents
President	Tenure
Ned Irish	1946–1974
Mike Burke	1974–1982
Jack Krumpe	1982–1986
Richard Evans	1986–1991
Dave Checketts	1991–1996
Ernie Grunfeld	1996–1999
Scott Layden	1999–2004
Isiah Thomas	2004–2008
Donnie Walsh	2008–2011
Glen Grunwald	2011–2013
Steve Mills	2013–2014
Phil Jackson	2014–2017
Steve Mills	2017–2020
Leon Rose	2020–present

Owners

Ownership history
Owner	Tenure
Madison Square Garden Corporation	1946–1977
Gulf+Western/Paramount Coummunications	1977–1994
Viacom	1994
ITT Corporation and Cablevision	1994–1997
Cablevision	1997–2010
Madison Square Garden Sports	2010–present

== Franchise leaders ==
Bold denotes still active with team.

Italic denotes still active, but not with team.

Points scored (regular season) as of the end of the 2025–26 season

1. Patrick Ewing (23,665)
2. Walt Frazier (14,617)
3. Willis Reed (12,183)
4. Allan Houston (11,165)
5. Carl Braun (10,449)
6. Richie Guerin (10,392)
7. Carmelo Anthony (10,186)
8. Earl Monroe (9,679)
9. Dick Barnett (9,442)
10. Bill Bradley (9,217)
11. Bill Cartwright (9,006)
12. John Starks (8,489)
13. Willie Naulls (8,318)
14. Gerald Wilkins (8,258)
15. Harry Gallatin (7,771)
16. Charles Oakley (7,528)
17. **Jalen Brunson** (7,462)
18. Julius Randle (7,445)
19. Dave DeBusschere (6,957)
20. Kenny Sears (6,854)

Other statistics (regular season) as of the end of the 2025–26 season

Most minutes played
Player	Minutes
Patrick Ewing	37,586
Walt Frazier	28,995
Charles Oakley	23,959
Willis Reed	23,073
Bill Bradley	22,799

Most rebounds
Player	Rebounds
Patrick Ewing	10,759
Willis Reed	8,414
Charles Oakley	7,291
Harry Gallatin	5,935
Willie Naulls	5,015

Most assists
Player	Assists
Walt Frazier	4,791
Mark Jackson	4,005
Dick McGuire	2,950
Carl Braun	2,821
Richie Guerin	2,725

Most steals
Player	Steals
Patrick Ewing	1,061
Charles Oakley	844
Micheal Ray Richardson	810
Ray Williams	750
Charlie Ward	744

Most blocks
Player	Blocks
Patrick Ewing	2,758
**Mitchell Robinson**	690
Bill Cartwright	543
Marvin Webster	542
Kurt Thomas	479

== Individual awards ==
NBA MVP

- Willis Reed – 1970

NBA Finals MVP

- Willis Reed – 1970, 1973
- Jalen Brunson – 2026

NBA Eastern Conference finals MVP

- Jalen Brunson – 2026

NBA Cup MVP

- Jalen Brunson – 2025

NBA Rookie of the Year

- Willis Reed – 1965
- Patrick Ewing – 1986
- Mark Jackson – 1988

NBA Sixth Man of the Year

- Anthony Mason – 1995
- John Starks – 1997
- J. R. Smith − 2013

NBA Defensive Player of the Year

- Tyson Chandler – 2012

NBA Most Improved Player

- Julius Randle – 2021

NBA Clutch Player of the Year

- Jalen Brunson – 2025

NBA Coach of the Year

- Red Holzman – 1970
- Pat Riley – 1993
- Tom Thibodeau – 2021

NBA Sportsmanship Award

- Jason Kidd – 2013

J. Walter Kennedy Citizenship Award

- Mike Glenn – 1981
- Rory Sparrow – 1986

NBA scoring champion

- Bernard King – 1985
- Carmelo Anthony – 2013

NBA All-Star Game head coaches

- Joe Lapchick – 1951, 1953, 1954
- Red Holzman – 1970, 1971
- Pat Riley – 1993
- Jeff Van Gundy – 2000

All-NBA First Team

- Harry Gallatin – 1954
- Walt Frazier – 1970, 1972, 1974, 1975
- Willis Reed – 1970
- Bernard King – 1984, 1985
- Patrick Ewing – 1990

All-NBA Second Team

- Carl Braun – 1948, 1954
- Dick McGuire – 1951
- Harry Gallatin – 1955
- Richie Guerin – 1959, 1960, 1962
- Willis Reed – 1967–1969, 1971
- Dave DeBusschere – 1969
- Walt Frazier – 1971, 1973
- Patrick Ewing – 1988, 1989, 1991–1993, 1997
- Amar'e Stoudemire – 2011
- Carmelo Anthony – 2013
- Julius Randle – 2021
- Jalen Brunson – 2024–2026

All-NBA Third Team

- Carmelo Anthony – 2012
- Tyson Chandler – 2012
- Julius Randle – 2023
- Karl-Anthony Towns – 2025

NBA All-Defensive First Team

- Dave DeBusschere – 1969–1974
- Walt Frazier – 1969–1975
- Willis Reed – 1970
- Micheal Ray Richardson – 1981
- Charles Oakley – 1994
- Tyson Chandler – 2013

NBA All-Defensive Second Team

- Patrick Ewing – 1988, 1989, 1992
- John Starks – 1993
- Charles Oakley – 1998
- Tyson Chandler – 2012
- OG Anunoby – 2026

NBA All-Rookie First Team

- Art Heyman – 1964
- Jim Barnes – 1965
- Howard Komives – 1965
- Willis Reed – 1965
- Dick Van Arsdale – 1966
- Cazzie Russell – 1967
- Walt Frazier – 1968
- Phil Jackson – 1968
- Bill Cartwright – 1980
- Darrell Walker – 1984
- Patrick Ewing – 1986
- Mark Jackson – 1988
- Channing Frye – 2006
- Landry Fields – 2011
- Iman Shumpert – 2012
- Tim Hardaway Jr. – 2014
- Kristaps Porziņģis – 2016
- Willy Hernangómez – 2017

NBA All-Rookie Second Team

- Rod Strickland – 1989
- Langston Galloway – 2015
- Mitchell Robinson – 2019
- Immanuel Quickley – 2021

== Rivalries ==
=== Boston Celtics ===
The New York Knicks and the Boston Celtics are two of the three remaining teams from the original 1946 NBA (the other is the Golden State Warriors). The rivalry stems from the old rivalry between the cities of New York City and Boston, which is also mirrored in both the Yankees–Red Sox and Jets–Patriots rivalries. The fact that Boston and New York City are only 190 miles apart contributes to it.

The teams have met 16 times in the postseason. The last time was in the 2024–25 season, when New York defeated Boston in six games in the conference semifinals. The Knicks faced the Celtics, who were without Rajon Rondo because of a mid-season injury, in the first round of the 2013 playoffs. In both games 1 and 2, Celtics had a lead going into halftime but were held to 25 and 23 points respectively in the second half, which was an all-time low for the franchise in the playoffs. Knicks gained a 3–0 lead in the series, but Boston avoided elimination in games 4 and 5. In game six, Knicks once led by 26 points in the fourth quarter, then the Celtics went onto a 20–0 run in less than 5 minutes to make it a close game, but Knicks still won and moved on to the second round.

=== Brooklyn Nets ===
The Brooklyn Nets, formerly the New Jersey Nets, are the Knicks' closest rival geographically. Both teams play in New York City, with the Knicks in Manhattan and the Nets in Brooklyn. Media outlets have noted the Knicks-Nets rivalry's similarity to those of other New York City teams, such as Major League Baseball's Subway Series rivalry between the American League's New York Yankees (the Bronx) and the National League's New York Mets (Queens), due to both boroughs' proximity through the New York City Subway. Historically, the boroughs of Manhattan and Brooklyn competed via the Dodgers–Giants rivalry, when the two teams were known as the Brooklyn Dodgers and the New York Giants. Like the Knicks and Nets, the Giants and Dodgers played in Manhattan and Brooklyn, respectively, and were fierce divisional rivals. The rivalry between the New York Islanders and New York Rangers of the National Hockey League also had this distinction when the Islanders played in Brooklyn from 2015 to 2020. Due to the Knicks and Nets being located in the boroughs of Manhattan and Brooklyn, some media outlets have dubbed this rivalry "Clash of the Boroughs". The Knicks and Nets have met in the playoffs three times, with the Knicks winning two of the three meetings. The Knicks defeated the Nets in the playoffs in 1983 and 1994, while the Nets won their most recent meeting in 2004.

=== Chicago Bulls ===
The Knicks have a strong rivalry with the Chicago Bulls. The rivalry's most intense period was during the late 1980s and early 90s, when both teams were huge playoff contenders. This intensity was due to a variety of factors: the great frequency in which the teams competed against each other in high-stakes contests and playoff series; well-known players such as Michael Jordan, Scottie Pippen, Patrick Ewing, and John Starks; the reputations of the team's respective cities; and personnel changes and conflicts between the teams.

The rivalry was dormant through much of the 2000s, with both teams rebuilding after the retirements of Patrick Ewing and Michael Jordan. However, with the arrival of future NBA MVP Derrick Rose in 2008, the Chicago Bulls began experiencing success once again. In the summer of 2010, the Bulls signed Carlos Boozer and the Knicks signed Amar'e Stoudemire, making both teams playoff contenders once again. Carmelo Anthony and Tyson Chandler joined the Knicks soon after, and the rivalry between the two teams appears to have been reborn.

=== Indiana Pacers ===
The rivalry between the New York Knicks and the Indiana Pacers started in 1993 and quickly became one of the most bitter in NBA history. They met in the playoffs 6 times from 1993 to 2000, fueling a rivalry epitomized by the enmity between Reggie Miller and prominent Knick fan Spike Lee. Miller likened it to the Hatfield–McCoy feud, and The New York Times said in 1998 that it was "as combustible as any in the league". The rivalry gave Miller the nickname "The Knick-Killer". His clutch performances were frequently followed by jabs at Lee like the choke sign, adding fuel to the rivalry. The rivalry renewed during the 2013 NBA playoffs in the Eastern Conference semifinals, with Indiana taking the series 4 games to 2, and again in the second round of the 2024 NBA playoffs, where the Pacers upset the Knicks in seven games.

=== Miami Heat ===
The Miami Heat were one of the New York Knicks' strongest inter-divisional foes. The two teams met in the playoffs each year from 1997 to 2000, with all four of those series being played to the maximum number of games. Pat Riley, the head coach of the Miami Heat at the time, served as the head coach of the Knicks from 1991 to 1995 and led the Knicks to the 1994 NBA Finals. During this four-year span, the Heat and the Knicks each won two playoff series against each other.

The two teams met again in the first round of the 2012 NBA playoffs, for the first time since the 1990s rivalry days. The Heat won the series, 4–1, and later went on to win the 2012 NBA Finals.

== Bibliography ==
- Benson, Michael (2007). Everything You Wanted to Know About the New York Knicks: A Who's Who of Everyone Who Ever Played on or Coached the NBA's Most Celebrated Team (First ed.). Lanham, Maryland: Taylor Trade Publishing. ISBN 978-1-58979-374-3.
- Hahn, Alan (2012). New York Knicks: The Complete Illustrated History (First ed.). Minneapolis: MVP Books. ISBN 978-0-7603-4331-9.
- Schumacher, Michael (2008). Mr. Basketball: George Mikan, the Minneapolis Lakers, and the Birth of the NBA (Reprint ed.). Minneapolis: University of Minnesota Press. ISBN 978-0-8166-5675-2.

Preceded by Boston Celtics	NBA champions 1969–70	Succeeded by Milwaukee Bucks
Preceded by Los Angeles Lakers	NBA champions 1972–73	Succeeded by Boston Celtics
Preceded by Oklahoma City Thunder	NBA champions 2025–26	Incumbent
Preceded by Milwaukee Bucks	NBA Cup champions 2025	Incumbent
