= Steve Mills (sports executive) =

American sports executive (born 1959)

Personal information
- Born: October 6, 1959 (age 67) Roosevelt, New York, U.S.
- Listed height: 6 ft 1 in (1.85 m)

Career information
- High school: Friends Academy (Locust Valley, New York)
- College: Princeton (1978–1981)
- NBA draft: 1981: undrafted
- Playing career: 1981–1982
- Position: Guard

Steve Mills (born October 6, 1959) is an American sports executive who served as president of the New York Knicks twice between 2013 to 2020.

== Education ==
Mills attended the Friends Academy in Locust Valley and Princeton University, where he graduated in 1981 with a B.A. in Sociology.

== Playing career ==
Mills played college basketball for the Princeton Tigers, where he was teammate of future NBA coach David Blatt, under the tutelage of coach Pete Carril from 1978 to 1981. During his senior season, Mills averaged 12.0 points and 1.5 steals. After going undrafted in the 1981 NBA draft, he initially accepted a position as manager of new business development for Chemical Bank. After receiving an offer to play professionally in Ecuador, Chemical agreed to hold the position for Mills until he joined the bank in 1982.

== Executive career ==
Mills worked for the National Basketball Association for sixteen years beginning in 1984 after having worked at Chemical Bank. Mills ascension while at the NBA was notable. He was an account executive in the corporate sponsorship department of NBA properties and program manager for NBA properties. He became vice-president of special events, after which he was senior vice-president of Basketball and Player Development, Mills then became Chief operating officer and Sports Business President of Madison Square Garden in 2003. His duties at MSG included supervising day-to-day operations, including finances, business strategies of the NBA's New York Knicks, NHL's New York Rangers and the WNBA's New York Liberty. All sports related activities were under his jurisdiction, including boxing, college basketball and track & field.

In 2009, Mills left MSG and joined Magic Johnson Enterprises where he helped create the Athletes & Entertainers Wealth Management Group, LLC (A&E). of which he was a partner.

On September 26, 2013, the New York Knicks announced Mills would be the executive vice president and general manager of the organization.

On July 14, 2017, after announcing that Scott Perry would become the Knicks' newest general manager, the Knicks also announced Mills would be the new president of the organization, replacing the role that was previously held by Phil Jackson. On February 4, 2020, Mills parted ways with the Knicks following a 15-36 record for the season.

== Memberships ==
Mills was on the Board of Trustees of USA Basketball and the Board of Trustees of the Basketball Hall of Fame. He currently is on the Board of Advisors for the Hospital for Special Surgery, Board of Directors of Harlem Junior Tennis, Board of Trustees of Ariel Investments and Board of Directors Princeton University Varsity Club. He also Co-Chairs the Princeton University Connect Initiative Task Force.

== Achievements ==
Mills was named Black Enterprise's Corporate Executive of the Year in 2003, and was listed as one of the Top Front Office Team Executives on Black Enterprise's 50 Most Powerful Blacks in Sports in 2005.

== Personal life ==
Mills was born on October 6, 1959, in Roosevelt, New York. His father, Ollie Mills, was a teacher and a basketball coach. His mother was a social worker. He grew up as a Knicks fan and lived around the corner from NBA legend Julius Erving. Mills and his wife Beverly reside on the Upper West Side of Manhattan in addition to a home In South Orange, New Jersey, and have two daughters and a dog.
