= Scott Perry (basketball) =

American basketball coach (born 1963)

Sacramento Kings
- Position: General manager
- League: NBA

Personal information
- Born: November 25, 1963 (age 62) Detroit, Michigan, U.S.

Career information
- High school: University of Detroit Jesuit (Detroit, Michigan)
- College: Oregon (1981–1982); Wayne State (1984–1986)
- Coaching career: 1993–2000

Career history

Coaching
- 1993–1997: Michigan (assistant)
- 1997–2000: Eastern Kentucky

Scott Perry (born November 25, 1963) is an American basketball executive and former coach who is the general manager for the Sacramento Kings of the National Basketball Association (NBA). He previously served as the general manager for the New York Knicks of the National Basketball Association (NBA) from 2017 to 2023.

== Early life ==
Perry's father, Lowell Perry, was an All-American football player at the University of Michigan in 1951 and went on to play for the Pittsburgh Steelers in 1956, where he later became the first African-American assistant coach in the NFL in 1957. His mother was a Detroit Public Schools journalism teacher who later became an attorney.

== Playing career ==
Perry was an All-Catholic and All-State basketball player at University of Detroit Jesuit High school in 1981. He received a scholarship to attend the University of Oregon, where he played one season. Perry finished his collegiate playing career at Wayne State University in 1986, where he was a team captain and an honorable mention All-Great Lakes Intercollegiate Athletic Conference performer. His team made it to the NCAA Division II Elite Eight. Perry earned a bachelor's degree in business administration.

== Coaching career ==
Perry started his coaching career in 1988 at the University of Detroit Mercy, where he spent five seasons. He went on to become an assistant coach at The University of Michigan, where he was instrumental in guiding the team to the NCAA Division I Elite Eight in 1994. Perry was the catalyst for Michigan's nationally recognized top-ranked recruiting classes in both 1994 and 1995. His final year with the Wolverines resulted in a NIT Championship. Perry completed his coaching career as the head coach at Eastern Kentucky University from 1997 to 2000.

== Executive career ==
Perry was hired as a front office executive for the Detroit Pistons by president Joe Dumars in June 2000. As a member of their executive team, Perry assisted in building a roster that went to six Eastern Conference Finals appearances (2003–2008), two Eastern Conference Championships (2004, 2005) and the 2004 NBA championship.

Afterward, Perry served as the assistant general manager for the Seattle SuperSonics for one season (2007–08). He was part of the front office staff that drafted Kevin Durant to the Sonics/Thunder in the first round with the second overall pick. He then returned to the Pistons to become vice president of basketball operations from 2008 to 2012.

On June 25, 2012, Perry was hired by the Orlando Magic general manager Rob Hennigan to become Hennigan's vice president and assistant general manager. ESPN basketball analyst and former NBA player Chauncey Billups spoke highly of Perry as the assistant general manager of the Magic, saying, "I love Scott Perry in the front office." In his time in Orlando, Perry helped draft Victor Oladipo (2013), Aaron Gordon and Elfrid Payton (2014), and Mario Hezonja (2015).

On April 21, 2017, Perry was hired by the Sacramento Kings as vice president of basketball operations. Three months later, on July 14, 2017, Perry was hired to become the general manager of the New York Knicks. As compensation for the movement, the Knicks gave the Kings a 2019 second round pick and cash considerations, with the Kings later hiring Brandon Williams as his replacement. On February 4, 2020, Perry took over basketball operations duties on an interim basis after president Steve Mills was fired.

He was general manager for the New York Knicks of the National Basketball Association (NBA) between 2017 and 2023. His contract expired at the end of the 2023 season, and the Knicks decided not to bring him back.

On April 21, 2025, Perry was hired by the Kings as general manager.

== Personal life ==
He and his wife Kim have a daughter, Chelsea.

Sporting positions
Preceded by Steve Mills	New York Knicks General Manager; 2020–2023	Succeeded by Gersson Rosas
Preceded by Monte McNair	Sacramento Kings General Manager; 2025–present	Incumbent
