= List of New York Knicks seasons =

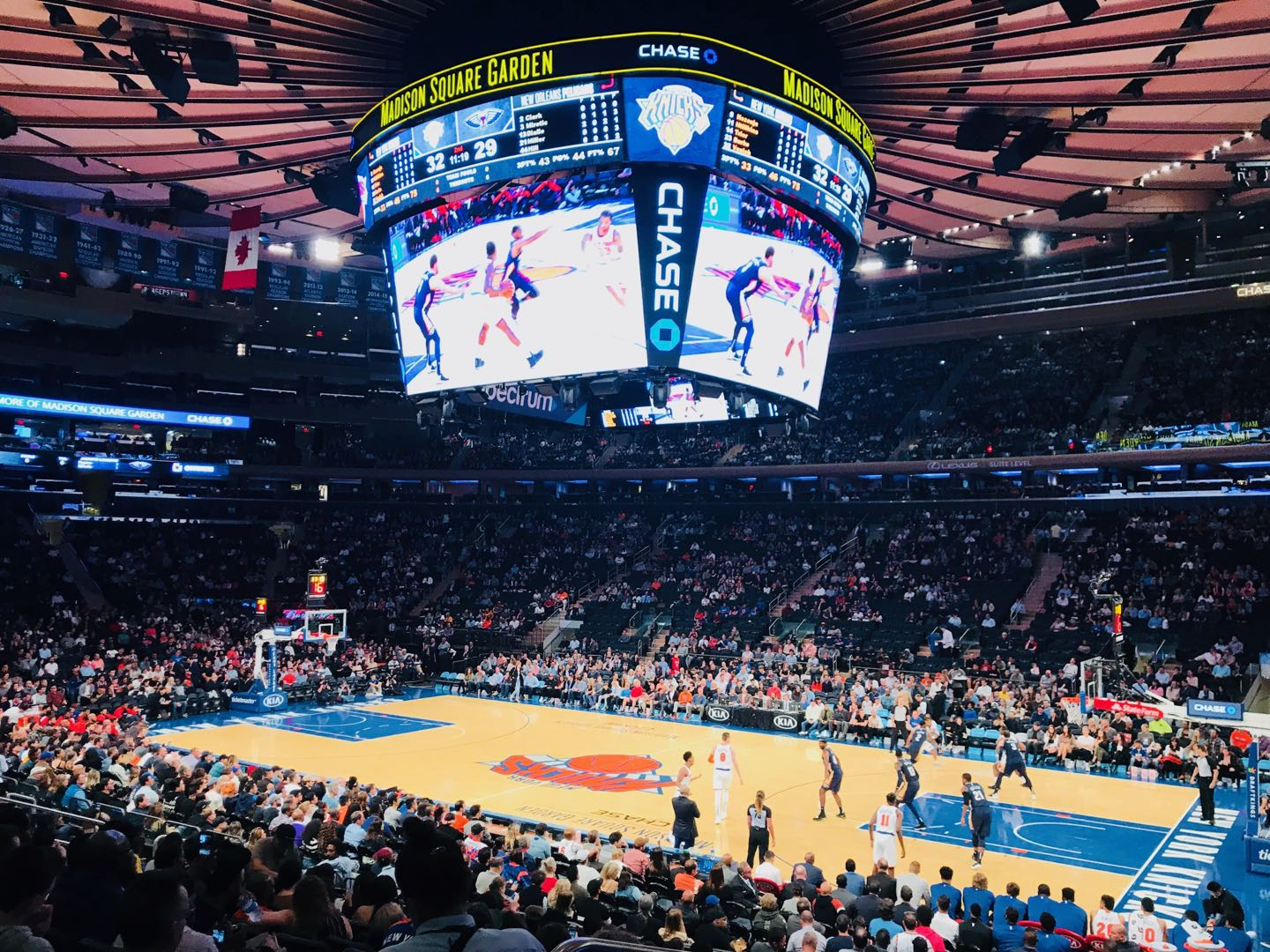
Madison Square Garden is the home arena of the Knicks.

The New York Knickerbockers, better known as the New York Knicks, are a professional basketball team based in New York City that competes in the National Basketball Association (NBA). The team has played in the NBA throughout the league's entire history. The Knicks play in the Eastern Conference's Atlantic Division. In its 80 seasons, the franchise has reached the NBA Finals nine times and won three championships. As of the end of the 2025–26 season, the Knicks have won more than 3,000 regular season games, and the team has the fourth-highest victory total in NBA history. Since 1968, the Knicks have played home games at Madison Square Garden.

One of the Basketball Association of America's (BAA) 11 teams during its inaugural season, the Knicks won the league's first game, defeating the Toronto Huskies 68–66 on November 1, 1946. The team qualified for the playoffs in the league's first three seasons before the BAA merged with the National Basketball League in 1949 to form the NBA. Following the merger, the Knicks extended their streak of playoff appearances to nine consecutive years. The team reached the NBA Finals each year from 1952 to 1954. They returned to the Finals in 1970 and defeated the Los Angeles Lakers in seven games for the team's first title. The Knicks and Lakers faced each other again in the 1972 Finals, a series that the Lakers won four games to one. The Knicks earned their second NBA championship the following year, as they won a rematch with Los Angeles in five games.

From 1988 to 2001, the franchise made the playoffs in 14 consecutive seasons, a franchise record. The team reached its first NBA Finals in 21 seasons in 1994, losing to the Houston Rockets in seven games. Five years later, the Knicks again lost in the NBA Finals, this time in a five-game series against the San Antonio Spurs. The team struggled during the early years of the 21st century, winning only one playoff series between 2001 and 2022. The Knicks returned to the playoffs in the 2022–23 season where they reached the conference semifinals, and later played in the conference finals in 2024–25. During the 2025–26 season, the Knicks returned to the NBA Finals and won the series in five games against the Spurs, claiming the team's first championship in 53 years.

== Table key ==
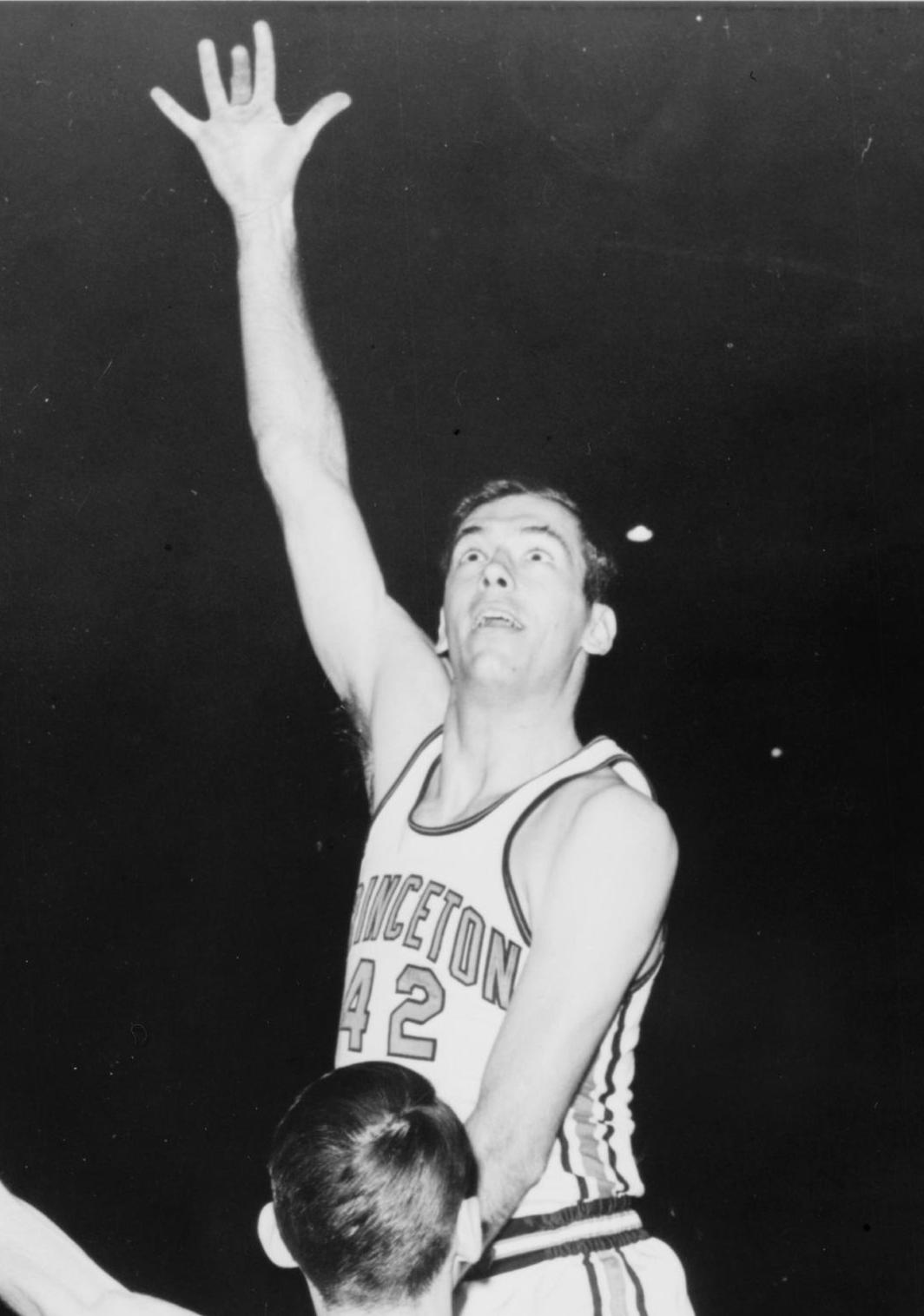
Bill Bradley was a member of the Knicks' 1969–70 and 1972–73 championship-winning teams.

NBA champions
(1947–present) †
Conference champions
(1971–present) *
Division champions
(1947–present) ^
Playoff berth
(1947–present) ¤
Play-in berth
(2021–present) ×

Conf. finish	Final position in conference standings
Div. finish	Final position in division standings
W	Number of regular season wins
L	Number of regular season losses
Win%	Winning percentage
GB	Games behind first-place team in division (Note: The formula is as follows: $\mathrm{Games}\ \mathrm{Behind} = \frac{(\mathrm{TeamA_{Wins}} - \mathrm{TeamB_{Wins}}) + (\mathrm{TeamB_{Losses}} - \mathrm{TeamA_{Losses}})}{\mathrm{2}}$)
Ref.	Reference
ASG MVP	All-Star Game Most Valuable Player
COY	Coach of the Year
DPOY	Defensive Player of the Year
FMVP	NBA Finals Most Valuable Player
JWKC	J. Walter Kennedy Citizenship Award
MIP	Most Improved Player
MVP	Most Valuable Player
ROY	Rookie of the Year
SIX	Sixth Man of the Year
SPOR	Sportsmanship Award

== Seasons ==
Note: Statistics are correct as of the 2025–26 season.

Season	Conf.	Conf. finish (Note: The Finish columns for both conference and division list regular season results and exclude postseason play.)	Div.	Div. finish	W (Note: The Wins and Losses columns list regular season results and exclude any postseason play. Regular and postseason records are combined only below the table.)	L	Win%	Playoffs	Awards	Head coach	Ref.
1946–47	—	—	Eastern	3rd ¤	33	27	.550	Won first round vs. Cleveland Rebels, 2–1; Lost semifinals to Philadelphia Warriors, 2–0	—	Neil Cohalan	
1947–48	—	—	Eastern	2nd ¤	26	22	.542	Lost first round to Baltimore Bullets, 2–1	—	Joe Lapchick	
1948–49	—	—	Eastern	2nd ¤	32	28	.533	Won division semifinals vs. Baltimore Bullets, 2–1; Lost division finals to Washington Capitols, 2–1	—	Joe Lapchick	
1949–50	—	—	Eastern	2nd ¤	40	28	.588	Won division semifinals vs. Washington Capitols, 2–0; Lost division finals to Syracuse Nationals, 2–1	—	Joe Lapchick	
1950–51	—	—	Eastern	3rd ¤	36	30	.545	Won division semifinals vs. Boston Celtics, 2–0; Won division finals vs. Syracuse Nationals, 3–2; Lost NBA Finals to Rochester Royals, 4–3	—	Joe Lapchick	
1951–52	—	—	Eastern	3rd ¤	37	29	.561	Won division semifinals vs. Boston Celtics, 2–1; Won division finals vs. Syracuse Nationals, 3–1; Lost NBA Finals to Minneapolis Lakers, 4–3	—	Joe Lapchick	
1952–53	—	—	Eastern ^	1st ^	47	23	.671	Won division semifinals vs. Baltimore Bullets, 2–0; Won division finals vs. Boston Celtics, 3–1; Lost NBA Finals to Minneapolis Lakers, 4–1	—	Joe Lapchick	
1953–54	—	—	Eastern ^	1st ^	44	28	.611	Lost round-robin to Boston Celtics and Syracuse Nationals, 4–0	—	Joe Lapchick	
1954–55	—	—	Eastern	2nd ¤	38	34	.528	Lost division semifinals to Boston Celtics, 2–1	—	Joe Lapchick	
1955–56	—	—	Eastern	4th (Note: Though the Knicks had the same record as Syracuse in the Eastern Division, they lost the tiebreaker and finished fourth.) ¤	35	37	.486	Lost division tiebreaker to Syracuse Nationals, 1–0	—	Joe Lapchick; Vince Boryla	
1956–57	—	—	Eastern	4th	36	36	.500	—	—	Vince Boryla	
1957–58	—	—	Eastern	4th	35	37	.486	—	—	Vince Boryla; Andrew Levane	
1958–59	—	—	Eastern	2nd ¤	40	32	.556	Lost division semifinals to Syracuse Nationals, 2–0	—	Andrew Levane	
1959–60	—	—	Eastern	4th	27	48	.360	—	—	Andrew Levane; Carl Braun	
1960–61	—	—	Eastern	4th	21	58	.266	—	—	Carl Braun	
1961–62	—	—	Eastern	4th	29	51	.363	—	—	Eddie Donovan	
1962–63	—	—	Eastern	4th	21	59	.263	—	—	Eddie Donovan	
1963–64	—	—	Eastern	4th	22	58	.275	—	—	Eddie Donovan	
1964–65	—	—	Eastern	4th	31	49	.388	—	Willis Reed (ROY)	Eddie Donovan; Harry Gallatin	
1965–66	—	—	Eastern	4th	30	50	.375	—	—	Harry Gallatin; Dick McGuire	
1966–67	—	—	Eastern	4th ¤	36	45	.444	Lost division semifinals to Boston Celtics, 3–1	—	Dick McGuire	
1967–68	—	—	Eastern	3rd ¤	43	39	.524	Lost division semifinals to Philadelphia 76ers, 4–2	—	Dick McGuire; Red Holzman	
1968–69	—	—	Eastern	3rd ¤	54	28	.659	Won division semifinals vs. Baltimore Bullets, 4–0; Lost division finals to Boston Celtics, 4–2	—	Red Holzman	
1969–70 †	—	—	Eastern ^	1st ^	60	22	.732	Won division semifinals vs. Baltimore Bullets, 4–3; Won division finals vs. Milwaukee Bucks, 4–1; Won NBA Finals vs. Los Angeles Lakers, 4–3 †	Willis Reed (MVP, FMVP, ASG MVP); Red Holzman (COY)	Red Holzman	
1970–71	Eastern	1st ¤	Atlantic (Note: Before the 1970–71 season, the NBA realigned into Eastern and Western conferences, with four divisions between them. As a result of the realignment, New York was placed in the Eastern Conference as a member of the Atlantic Division.) ^	1st ^	52	30	.634	Won conference semifinals vs. Atlanta Hawks, 4–1; Lost conference finals to Baltimore Bullets, 4–3	—	Red Holzman	
1971–72	Eastern *	3rd ¤	Atlantic	2nd	48	34	.585	Won conference semifinals vs. Baltimore Bullets, 4–2; Won conference finals vs. Boston Celtics, 4–1; Lost NBA Finals to Los Angeles Lakers, 4–1 *	—	Red Holzman	
1972–73 †	Eastern *	3rd ¤	Atlantic	2nd	57	25	.695	Won conference semifinals vs. Baltimore Bullets, 4–1; Won conference finals vs. Boston Celtics, 4–3; Won NBA Finals vs. Los Angeles Lakers, 4–1 †	Willis Reed (FMVP)	Red Holzman	
1973–74	Eastern	3rd ¤	Atlantic	2nd	49	33	.598	Won conference semifinals vs. Capital Bullets, 4–3; Lost conference finals to Boston Celtics, 4–1	—	Red Holzman	
1974–75	Eastern	5th ¤	Atlantic	3rd	40	42	.488	Lost first round to Houston Rockets, 2–1	Walt Frazier (ASG MVP)	Red Holzman	
1975–76	Eastern	7th	Atlantic	4th	38	44	.463	—	—	Red Holzman	
1976–77	Eastern	7th	Atlantic	3rd	40	42	.488	—	—	Red Holzman	
1977–78	Eastern	5th ¤	Atlantic	2nd	43	39	.524	Won first round vs. Cleveland Cavaliers, 2–0; Lost conference semifinals to Philadelphia 76ers, 4–0	—	Willis Reed	
1978–79	Eastern	7th	Atlantic	4th	31	51	.378	—	—	Willis Reed; Red Holzman	
1979–80	Eastern	7th	Atlantic	4th (Note: Though the Knicks had the same record as Washington in the Atlantic Division, they lost the tiebreaker and finished fourth.)	39	43	.476	—	—	Red Holzman	
1980–81	Eastern	4th ¤	Atlantic	3rd	50	32	.610	Lost first round to Chicago Bulls, 2–0	Mike Glenn (JWKC)	Red Holzman	
1981–82	Eastern	10th	Atlantic	5th	33	49	.402	—	—	Red Holzman	
1982–83	Eastern	5th ¤	Atlantic	4th	44	38	.537	Won first round vs. New Jersey Nets, 2–0; Lost conference semifinals to Philadelphia 76ers, 4–0	—	Hubie Brown	
1983–84	Eastern	5th ¤	Atlantic	3rd	47	35	.573	Won first round vs. Detroit Pistons, 3–2; Lost conference semifinals to Boston Celtics, 4–3	—	Hubie Brown	
1984–85	Eastern	10th	Atlantic	5th	24	58	.293	—	—	Hubie Brown	
1985–86	Eastern	11th	Atlantic	5th	23	59	.280	—	Patrick Ewing (ROY); Rory Sparrow (Note: Sparrow and Michael Cooper were co-winners of the award.) (JWKC)	Hubie Brown	
1986–87	Eastern	11th	Atlantic	5th (Note: Though the Knicks had the same record as New Jersey in the Atlantic Division, they lost the tiebreaker and finished fifth.)	24	58	.293	—	—	Hubie Brown; Bob Hill	
1987–88	Eastern	8th ¤	Atlantic	3rd (Note: Though the Knicks had the same record as Washington in the Atlantic Division, they lost the tiebreaker and finished third.)	38	44	.463	Lost first round to Boston Celtics, 3–1	Mark Jackson (ROY)	Rick Pitino	
1988–89	Eastern	2nd ¤	Atlantic ^	1st ^	52	30	.634	Won first round vs. Philadelphia 76ers, 3–0; Lost conference semifinals to Chicago Bulls, 4–2	—	Rick Pitino	
1989–90	Eastern	5th ¤	Atlantic	3rd	45	37	.549	Won first round vs. Boston Celtics, 3–2; Lost conference semifinals to Detroit Pistons, 4–1	—	Stu Jackson	
1990–91	Eastern	8th ¤	Atlantic	3rd	39	43	.476	Lost first round to Chicago Bulls, 3–0	—	Stu Jackson; John MacLeod	
1991–92	Eastern	4th ¤	Atlantic	2nd (Note: Though the Knicks had the same record as Boston in the Atlantic Division, they lost the tiebreaker and finished second.)	51	31	.622	Won first round vs. Detroit Pistons, 3–2; Lost conference semifinals to Chicago Bulls, 4–3	—	Pat Riley	
1992–93	Eastern	1st ¤	Atlantic ^	1st ^	60	22	.732	Won first round vs. Indiana Pacers, 3–1; Won conference semifinals vs. Charlotte Hornets, 4–1; Lost conference finals to Chicago Bulls, 4–2	Pat Riley (COY)	Pat Riley	
1993–94	Eastern *	2nd ¤	Atlantic ^	1st ^	57	25	.695	Won first round vs. New Jersey Nets, 3–1; Won conference semifinals vs. Chicago Bulls, 4–3; Won conference finals vs. Indiana Pacers, 4–3; Lost NBA Finals to Houston Rockets, 4–3 *	—	Pat Riley	
1994–95	Eastern	3rd ¤	Atlantic	2nd	55	27	.671	Won first round vs. Cleveland Cavaliers, 3–1; Lost conference semifinals to Indiana Pacers, 4–3	Anthony Mason (SIX)	Pat Riley	
1995–96	Eastern	5th ¤	Atlantic	2nd	47	35	.573	Won first round vs. Cleveland Cavaliers, 3–0; Lost conference semifinals to Chicago Bulls, 4–1	—	Don Nelson; Jeff Van Gundy	
1996–97	Eastern	3rd ¤	Atlantic	2nd	57	25	.695	Won first round vs. Charlotte Hornets, 3–0; Lost conference semifinals to Miami Heat, 4–3	John Starks (SIX)	Jeff Van Gundy	
1997–98	Eastern	7th ¤	Atlantic	2nd	43	39	.524	Won first round vs. Miami Heat, 3–2; Lost conference semifinals to Indiana Pacers, 4–1	—	Jeff Van Gundy	
1998–99 (Note: Due to a lockout, the season did not start until February 5, 1999, and all 29 teams played a shortened 50-game regular season schedule.)	Eastern *	8th ¤	Atlantic	4th	27	23	.540	Won first round vs. Miami Heat, 3–2; Won conference semifinals vs. Atlanta Hawks, 4–0; Won conference finals vs. Indiana Pacers, 4–2; Lost NBA Finals to San Antonio Spurs, 4–1 *	—	Jeff Van Gundy	
1999–00	Eastern	3rd ¤	Atlantic	2nd	50	32	.610	Won first round vs. Toronto Raptors, 3–0; Won conference semifinals vs. Miami Heat, 4–3; Lost conference finals to Indiana Pacers, 4–2	—	Jeff Van Gundy	
2000–01	Eastern	4th ¤	Atlantic	3rd	48	34	.585	Lost first round to Toronto Raptors, 3–2	—	Jeff Van Gundy	
2001–02	Eastern	13th	Atlantic	7th	30	52	.366	—	—	Jeff Van Gundy; Don Chaney	
2002–03	Eastern	10th	Atlantic	6th (Note: Though the Knicks had the same record as the Washington Wizards in the Atlantic Division, they lost the tiebreaker and finished sixth.)	37	45	.451	—	—	Don Chaney	
2003–04	Eastern	7th ¤	Atlantic	3rd	39	43	.476	Lost first round to New Jersey Nets, 4–0	—	Don Chaney; Herb Williams; Lenny Wilkens	
2004–05	Eastern	12th	Atlantic	5th (Note: Though the Knicks had the same record as Toronto in the Atlantic Division, they lost the tiebreaker and finished fifth.)	33	49	.402	—	—	Lenny Wilkens; Herb Williams	
2005–06	Eastern	15th	Atlantic	5th	23	59	.280	—	—	Larry Brown	
2006–07	Eastern	12th	Atlantic	4th	33	49	.402	—	—	Isiah Thomas	
2007–08	Eastern	14th	Atlantic	5th	23	59	.280	—	—	Isiah Thomas	
2008–09	Eastern	14th	Atlantic	5th	32	50	.390	—	—	Mike D'Antoni	
2009–10	Eastern	11th	Atlantic	3rd	29	53	.354	—	—	Mike D'Antoni	
2010–11	Eastern	6th ¤	Atlantic	2nd	42	40	.512	Lost first round to Boston Celtics, 4–0	—	Mike D'Antoni	
2011–12 (Note: Due to a lockout, the season did not start until December 25, 2011, and all 30 teams played a shortened 66-game regular season schedule.)	Eastern	7th ¤	Atlantic	2nd	36	30	.545	Lost first round to Miami Heat, 4–1	Tyson Chandler (DPOY)	Mike D'Antoni; Mike Woodson	
2012–13	Eastern	2nd ¤	Atlantic ^	1st ^	54	28	.659	Won first round vs. Boston Celtics, 4–2; Lost conference semifinals to Indiana Pacers, 4–2	J. R. Smith (SIX); Jason Kidd (SPOR)	Mike Woodson	
2013–14	Eastern	9th	Atlantic	3rd	37	45	.451	—	—	Mike Woodson	
2014–15	Eastern	15th	Atlantic	5th	17	65	.207	—	—	Derek Fisher	
2015–16	Eastern	13th	Atlantic	3rd	32	50	.390	—	—	Derek Fisher; Kurt Rambis	
2016–17	Eastern	12th	Atlantic	3rd	31	51	.378	—	—	Jeff Hornacek	
2017–18	Eastern	11th	Atlantic	4th	29	53	.354	—	—	Jeff Hornacek	
2018–19	Eastern	15th	Atlantic	5th	17	65	.207	—	—	David Fizdale	
2019–20 (Note: Regular season incomplete due to COVID-19 pandemic.)	Eastern	12th	Atlantic	5th	21	45	.318	—	—	David Fizdale; Mike Miller	
2020–21 (Note: Regular season shortened to 72 games due to COVID-19 pandemic.)	Eastern	4th ¤	Atlantic	3rd	41	31	.569	Lost first round to Atlanta Hawks, 4–1	Julius Randle (MIP); Tom Thibodeau (COY)	Tom Thibodeau	
2021–22	Eastern	11th	Atlantic	5th	37	45	.451	—	—	Tom Thibodeau	
2022–23	Eastern	5th ¤	Atlantic	3rd	47	35	.573	Won first round vs. Cleveland Cavaliers, 4–1; Lost conference semifinals vs. Miami Heat, 4–2	—	Tom Thibodeau	
2023–24	Eastern	2nd ¤	Atlantic	2nd	50	32	.610	Won first round vs. Philadelphia 76ers, 4–2; Lost conference semifinals vs. Indiana Pacers, 4–3	—	Tom Thibodeau	
2024–25	Eastern	3rd ¤	Atlantic	2nd	51	31	.622	Won first round vs. Detroit Pistons, 4–2; Won conference semifinals vs. Boston Celtics, 4–2; Lost conference finals vs. Indiana Pacers, 4–2	—	Tom Thibodeau	
2025–26 †	Eastern *	3rd ¤	Atlantic	2nd	53	29	.646	Won first round vs. Atlanta Hawks, 4–2; Won conference semifinals vs. Philadelphia 76ers, 4–0; Won conference finals vs. Cleveland Cavaliers, 4–0; Won NBA Finals vs. San Antonio Spurs, 4–1 †	Jalen Brunson (FMVP)	Mike Brown	

== All-time records ==
Statistic	Wins	Losses	W–L%
New York Knicks regular season record (1946–present)	3,078	3,191	.491
New York Knicks postseason record (1946–present)	226	215	.512
All-time regular and postseason record	3,304	3,406	.492
