= Ralph Kaplowitz =

American basketball player

Personal information
- Born: May 18, 1919 Bronx, New York, U.S.
- Died: February 2, 2009 (aged 89) Queens, New York, U.S.
- Listed height: 6 ft 2 in (1.88 m)
- Listed weight: 170 lb (77 kg)

Career information
- High school: DeWitt Clinton (Bronx, New York)
- College: NYU (1939–1941)
- Playing career: 1939–1951
- Position: Shooting guard
- Number: 5, 9

Career history
- 1939–1940: Jersey Reds
- 1945–1946: Philadelphia Sphas
- 1946–1947: New York Knicks
- 1947–1948: Philadelphia Warriors
- 1948–1950: Hartford Hurricanes
- 1950–1951: Bridgeport Roesslers

Career highlights
- BAA champion (1947)
- Stats at NBA.com
- Stats at Basketball Reference

Ralph Kaplowitz (May 18, 1919 – February 2, 2009) was an American professional basketball player. Kaplowitz played in the first two seasons of the Basketball Association of America (BAA), now known as the National Basketball Association (NBA), and was, at the time of his death, the oldest living person to have played for the New York Knicks.

== Background ==
Kaplowitz attended DeWitt Clinton High School and led his team to a PSAL championship. After graduating from Clinton, he attended New York University. After graduating from Clinton, he attended New York University. He joined NYU's varsity team as a sophomore in 1939–40, was the team's second-leading scorer with 183 points, and was named to the Collier's Magazine All-America first team. In his junior year, Kaplowitz did lead NYU in scoring, and to a winning record of 13–6. At the start of his senior year he was named team captain, but was drafted into the U.S. Army as an aviation cadet. After his basketball career, Ralph went on to thrive in other athletics. He is noted as winning multiple club championships at Old Westbury Golf and Country Club.

== Professional career ==
=== Philadelphia Sphas (1945–1946) ===
After the end of World War II, Kaplowitz was released from the Army, and he returned to NYU to finish his degree in education. After that, he signed with the Philadelphia Sphas (South Philadelphia Hebrew Association) of the American Basketball League, and averaged 10.6 points per game in the latter end of the 1945–46 season, facing the Baltimore Bullets in the championship round, but losing.

=== New York Knicks (1946–1947) ===
In August 1946, Kaplowitz received a telegram from the New York Knicks owner Ned Irish which read "Interested in having you play with New York professional basketball team next season. Please telephone me." Kaplowitz did join the Knicks, signing a one-year contract for $6,500.

On November 1, 1946, in Toronto, Canada, the 27-year-old Kaplowitz appeared in the starting line-up of the very first game of NBA/BAA history, alongside fellow Knicks Ossie Schectman, Sonny Hertzberg, Jake Weber, and Leo Gottlieb. Together, they beat the Toronto Huskies 68–66.

Kaplowitz and his teammates, many of them Jews, recall an increased level of anti-Semitic heckling by fans at Madison Square Garden as the season progressed. Halfway through the season, on January 16, 1947, the Knicks sold Kaplowitz to the Philadelphia Warriors, which were then coached and owned by Eddie Gottlieb. In a 1997 interview of the team, Hertzberg said that by the end of the 1946–47 season, he was the only Jewish player left on the Knicks' roster, but even he was traded during the league's first off-season break.

=== Philadelphia Warriors (1947–1948) ===
Kaplowitz played the second half of the 1946–47 season for the Warriors, who faced Kaplowitz' former team, the Knicks, in the playoffs, and swept that series to advance to the Finals. Then, they beat Max Zaslofsky and the Chicago Stags (4–1 series) to claim the first BAA championship.

In the 1947–48 season, the Warriors advanced to the Finals again, but Kaplowitz was once again beaten by Baltimore this time, in the Bullets' first season as a BAA team. After losing this series, Kaplowitz retired from the BAA after only two seasons, returning once again to the ABL, where he would play two seasons for the Hartford Hurricanes and one for the Bridgeport Roesslers.

== BAA career statistics ==
Legend
GP	Games played	GS	Games started	MPG	Minutes per game
FG%	Field goal percentage	3P%	3-point field goal percentage	FT%	Free throw percentage
RPG	Rebounds per game	APG	Assists per game	SPG	Steals per game
BPG	Blocks per game	PPG	Points per game	**Bold**	Career high
†	Won an NBA championship

=== Regular season ===
Year	Team	GP	FG%	FT%	APG	PPG
1946–47	New York	27	.259	.732	**.9**	**7.2**
1946–47†	Philadelphia	30	**.291**	.738	.4	7.0
1947–48	Philadelphia	**48**	.243	**.783**	.4	3.9
Career		105	.263	.749	.5	5.6

=== Playoffs ===
Year	Team	GP	FG%	FT%	APG	PPG
1947†	Philadelphia	10	.224	**.815**	**.6**	**6.6**
1948	Philadelphia	**13**	**.344**	.759	.5	**6.6**
Career		23	.283	.786	.6	6.6

== See also ==
- List of Jewish American sportspeople
