= Nat Militzok =

Personal information
- Born: May 3, 1923 The Bronx, New York, U.S.
- Died: May 14, 2009 (aged 86)
- Listed height: 6 ft 3 in (1.91 m)
- Listed weight: 195 lb (88 kg)

Career information
- High school: Stuyvesant (New York City, New York)
- College: CCNY (1941–1942); Hofstra (1942–1943); Cornell (1943–1944)
- Playing career: 1946–1952
- Position: Forward
- Number: 4, 16

Career history
- 1946–1947: New York Knicks
- 1947: Toronto Huskies
- 1948–1951: Scranton Miners
- 1951–1952: Saratoga Harlem Yankees
- Stats at NBA.com
- Stats at Basketball Reference

Nathan Militzok (May 3, 1923 – May 14, 2009) was an American professional basketball player. He played the forward position for various teams, including the New York Knicks.

== Early life ==
Militzok, who was Jewish, was born in The Bronx, New York. Recalling his childhood, he said: "I never saw a dirt field. Everything was cement. ... We had two choices: either go to the schoolyard and play ball or hang around on the corner and get in trouble. So, we played basketball all our lives." He attended Stuyvesant High School, where he played for the basketball team.

He began his college basketball career as a freshman at CCNY in 1941, playing for a team that had a 16–1 record. He then transferred to Hofstra University. World War II broke out, and he joined the Navy. Stationed at Cornell University, he joined its basketball team for the 1943–44 season.

== Professional career ==
After the end of World War II, Militzok joined the New York Knicks in 1946 in the Basketball Association of America, which merged with the National Basketball League in 1949 to become the NBA. Militzok played in the first game in NBA history for the Knicks against the Huskies on November 1, 1946, and was credited with the first assist in the league's history. He was traded to the Toronto Huskies in February 1947 for cash.

He joined the Scranton Miners of the American Basketball League in 1948–49. He played with them through 1951–52, when he was sent to the Saratoga Harlem Yankees.

== Later life ==
After his basketball career, he became an attorney.

In 1999, he and the other Jewish players on the Knicks, Sonny Hertzberg, Ralph Kaplowitz, Leo Gottlieb, Hank Rosenstein, and Ossie Schectman, were inducted into the National Jewish Sports Hall of Fame in New York.

== BAA career statistics ==
Legend
GP	Games played	FG%	Field-goal percentage
FT%	Free-throw percentage	APG	Assists per game
PPG	Points per game	**Bold**	Career high

=== Regular season ===
Year	Team	GP	FG%	FT%	APG	PPG
1946–47	New York	**36**	.243	.548	**.8**	4.0
1946–47	Toronto	21	**.295**	**.615**	.7	**4.8**
Career		57	.262	.571	.7	4.3
