= 1947–48 New York Knicks season =

Season of National Basketball Association team the New York Knicks

- Head coach: Joe Lapchick
- General manager: Ned Irish
- Arena: Madison Square Garden

Results
- Record: 26–22 (.542)
- Place: Division: 2nd
- Playoff finish: BAA Quarterfinals (lost to Bullets 1–2)

Local media
- Television: WJZ-TV
- Radio: WHN

The 1947–48 New York Knickerbockers season was the second season for the team in the Basketball Association of America (BAA), which later merged with the National Basketball League to become the National Basketball Association. The Knickerbockers finished in second place in the Eastern Division with a 26–22 record and qualified for the BAA Playoffs. In the first round, New York was eliminated by the Baltimore Bullets in a best-of-three series, two games to one. Carl Braun was the team's scoring leader during the season.

At the 1947 BAA draft, the Knickerbockers selected Dick Holub in the first round, with the fifth overall pick. The Knickerbockers also selected Wataru Misaka, who made the team's final roster and became "the first person of color to play in modern professional basketball", just months after the Major League Baseball color line had been broken by the Brooklyn Dodgers' Jackie Robinson. Misaka was cut after playing only three games with the team. The 1947–48 season was the first as New York's head coach for Joe Lapchick, who had previously held the same position for college basketball's St. John's; he had been hired in March 1947. The Knicks had a 13–13 record in the first 26 games of the season before going on an eight-game winning streak from January 28 to February 11. However, New York won only four of its final 12 regular season contests.

In game one of the first round of the playoffs, held in Baltimore, the Bullets defeated the Knickerbockers 85–81 behind a 34-point performance by Connie Simmons. The Knickerbockers evened the series at one victory apiece by winning the second game 79–69 in New York, as four players scored more than 10 points. The win forced a decisive third game back in Baltimore, which the Knickerbockers lost 84–77. Simmons led the Bullets with 22 points, while Chick Reiser added 21. The Bullets went on to win the 1948 BAA Finals.

== Draft ==
Round	Pick	Player	Position	Nationality	School/Club team
1	5	Dick Holub	C	United States	Long Island
–	–	Andy Duncan	F/C	United States	William & Mary
–	–	Ray Evans	–	United States	Kansas
–	–	Ed Golub	–	United States	–
–	–	Garland Head	–	United States	Texas Tech
–	–	Ron Livingston	–	United States	Saint Mary's
–	–	Dan Miller	–	United States	Saint Louis
–	–	Wataru Misaka	G	United States	Utah
–	–	Carl Reichert	–	United States	Findlay
–	–	Tom Tomlinson	–	United States	Southern Methodist

== Roster ==
1947–48 New York Knicks roster
Players

Pos.	No.	Player	Height	Weight	DOB	From
G/F	4	Carl Braun	6 ft 5 in (1.96 m)	180 lb (82 kg)	1927-09-25	Colgate
G/F	14	Tommy Byrnes	6 ft 3 in (1.91 m)	175 lb (79 kg)	1923-02-19	Seton Hall
G	9	Leo Gottlieb	5 ft 11 in (1.80 m)	180 lb (82 kg)	1920-11-28	DeWitt Clinton HS (NY)
G	8	Sonny Hertzberg	5 ft 10 in (1.78 m)	175 lb (79 kg)	1922-07-29	CCNY
C	11	Dick Holub	6 ft 6 in (1.98 m)	205 lb (93 kg)	1921-10-29	Long Island
C	19	Lee Knorek	6 ft 7 in (2.01 m)	215 lb (98 kg)	1921-07-15	Detroit Mercy
F	12	Ray Kuka	6 ft 3 in (1.91 m)	200 lb (91 kg)	1922-02-17	Notre Dame
G	15	Wat Misaka	5 ft 7 in (1.70 m)	150 lb (68 kg)	1923-12-21	Utah
F	5	Paul Noel	6 ft 4 in (1.93 m)	185 lb (84 kg)	1924-08-17	Kentucky
F/C	16	Bud Palmer	6 ft 4 in (1.93 m)	180 lb (82 kg)	1921-09-14	Princeton
G/F	7	Stan Stutz	5 ft 10 in (1.78 m)	170 lb (77 kg)	1920-04-14	Rhode Island
G	6	Sid Tanenbaum	6 ft 0 in (1.83 m)	160 lb (73 kg)	1925-10-08	NYU
G/F	17	Butch Van Breda Kolff	6 ft 3 in (1.91 m)	185 lb (84 kg)	1922-10-28	NYU

Coaches
Head coach

Joe Lapchick

Legend
- (DP) Unsigned draft pick
- (FA) Free agent
- (S) Suspended
- Injured

Roster

== Regular season ==
=== Season standings ===
#	Eastern Division				
#	Team	W	L	PCT	GB
1	x-Philadelphia Warriors	27	21	.563	–
2	x-New York Knicks	26	22	.542	1
3	x-Boston Celtics	20	28	.417	7
4	Providence Steamrollers	6	42	.125	21

=== Game log ===
#	Date	Opponent	Score	High points	Record
1	November 13	Washington	W 80–65	Bud Palmer (21)	1–0
2	November 15	St. Louis	W 73–67	Dick Holub (19)	2–0
3	November 18	@ Providence	W 87–69	Stan Stutz (27)	3–0
4	November 19	Chicago	L 63–81	Bud Palmer (16)	3–1
5	November 20	@ Baltimore	L 56–68	Dick Holub (24)	3–2
6	November 22	Philadelphia	L 78–83	Bud Palmer (30)	3–3
7	November 25	@ Boston	W 91–75	Dick Holub (19)	4–3
8	November 26	Boston	L 63–65	Bud Palmer (16)	4–4
9	November 27	@ Philadelphia	W 81–59	Leo Gottlieb (20)	5–4
10	December 1	Washington	L 62–70	Tommy Byrnes (15)	5–5
11	December 6	@ Providence	W 114–85	Carl Braun (47)	6–5
12	December 8	St. Louis	W 71–56	Bud Palmer (19)	7–5
13	December 10	@ Boston	W 79–75	Carl Braun (16)	8–5
14	December 13	@ Baltimore	W 80–66	Bud Palmer (18)	9–5
15	December 15	Philadelphia	L 71–74	Carl Braun (25)	9–6
16	December 18	@ Philadelphia	W 99–71	Tommy Byrnes (25)	10–6
17	December 20	Boston	W 70–58	Dick Holub (17)	11–6
18	December 23	@ Providence	L 58–66	Stan Stutz (17)	11–7
19	December 25	Providence	W 89–75	Tommy Byrnes (20)	12–7
20	December 27	Chicago	L 70–79	Carl Braun (16)	12–8
21	January 3	Baltimore	L 70–79	Dick Holub (16)	12–9
22	January 7	Chicago	L 74–79	Bud Palmer (21)	12–10
23	January 11	@ Chicago	L 86–99	Dick Holub (22)	12–11
24	January 15	@ St. Louis	W 59–55	Dick Holub (24)	13–11
25	January 17	@ Washington	L 62–78	Palmer, Tanenbaum (15)	13–12
26	January 19	Philadelphia	L 57–63	Carl Braun (24)	13–13
27	January 23	@ Boston	W 74–58	Sid Tanenbaum (21)	14–13
28	January 24	Baltimore	L 58–72	Sid Tanenbaum (14)	14–14
29	January 28	Providence	W 75–73	Dick Holub (16)	15–14
30	January 29	@ Philadelphia	W 66–60	Braun, Knorek, Tanenbaum (13)	16–14
31	January 31	Boston	W 66–64	Tommy Byrnes (17)	17–14
32	February 3	@ Providence	W 78–62	Stan Stutz (20)	18–14
33	February 4	Providence	W 108–69	Carl Braun (24)	19–14
34	February 6	@ Boston	W 68–57	Carl Braun (15)	20–14
35	February 8	Boston	W 80–68	Carl Braun (15)	21–14
36	February 11	Providence	W 86–63	Carl Braun (32)	22–14
37	February 12	@ Baltimore	L 86–96	Kuka, Tanenbaum (14)	22–15
38	February 14	Philadelphia	W 78–47	Bud Palmer (30)	23–15
39	February 18	@ Washington	W 79–75	Sid Tanenbaum (19)	24–15
40	February 19	@ Chicago	L 74–82	Carl Braun (23)	24–16
41	February 22	@ St. Louis	L 71–80	Sid Tanenbaum (23)	24–17
42	February 28	Baltimore	L 56–78	Stan Stutz (13)	24–18
43	March 2	@ Philadelphia	L 66–76	Bud Palmer (15)	24–19
44	March 6	Washington	W 69–64 (OT)	Bud Palmer (18)	25–19
45	March 10	St. Louis	L 73–82	Bud Palmer (25)	25–20
46	March 13	@ Chicago	L 51–58	Bud Palmer (14)	25–21
47	March 18	@ St. Louis	W 91–80	Paul Noel (19)	26–21
48	March 20	@ Washington	L 82–103	Bud Palmer (23)	26–22

== Playoffs ==
1948 playoff game log
First Round: 1–2 (home: 1–0; road: 0–2)

Game	Date	Team	Score	High points	Location	Series
1	March 27	@ Baltimore	L 81–85	Bud Palmer (21)	Baltimore Coliseum	0–1
2	March 28	Baltimore	W 79–69	Bud Palmer (18)	Madison Square Garden III	1–1
3	April 1	@ Baltimore	L 77–84	Sid Tanenbaum (18)	Baltimore Coliseum	1–2

1948 schedule

== Awards and records ==
- Carl Braun, All-BAA Second Team

== Transactions ==
=== Free agency ===
==== Additions ====
Player	Signed	Former team
Carl Braun	—	Colgate Raiders
Ray Kuka	—	Montana State Bobcats
Paul Noel	—	Kentucky Wildcats
Sid Tanenbaum	—	NYU Violets

==== Subtractions ====
Player	Reason left	New team
Aud Brindley	—	—
Bob Cluggish	—	—
Bob Fitzgerald	Signed contract	Syracuse Nationals
Frido Frey	Signed contract	Paterson Crescents
Frank Mangiapane	Signed contract	Paterson Crescents
Ossie Schectman	Signed contract	Paterson Crescents
