= The First Basket =

- Theatrical release poster
- Directed by: David Vyorst
- Produced by: David Vyorst
- Starring: Ossie Schectman; Red Auerbach; Peter Riegert
- Narrated by: Peter Riegert
- Edited by: Carol Slatkin
- Music by: Roberto Juan Rodriguez
- Distributed by: Laemmle/Zeller Films
- Release date: 2008
- Running time: 86 minutes
- Country: United States
- Language: English

The First Basket is a 2008 documentary film on professional basketball's influence on Jewish culture.

It is narrated by Peter Riegert. The film includes interviews and narratives provided by, and footage of, well known Jewish basketball personalities including Ossie Schectman, Red Auerbach, Sidney Hertzberg, and Edward Gottlieb as well as other Jewish basketball players.

== Structure ==
The movie is broken into four parts. The first part focuses on the 1946–47 New York Knickerbockers, and players such as Ossie Schectman, Sonny Hertzberg, Leo "Ace" Gotlieb, Ralph Kaplowitz, and Hank Rosenstein. The second part centers on how "Basketball Meant Being American," and the third part on professional basketball's development, including the start of the BAA and the NBA, the South Philadelphia Hebrew All Stars (SPHAs), basketball teams at City College of New York, Long Island University, and St. John's, and players including Nat Holman, Sammy Kaplan, Barney Sedran, Nat Krinsky, Red Saracheck, Red Holzman, and Red Auerbach. The last part centers on the beginning of the BAA and the NBA, Nat Holman, CCNY, and the 1951 CCNY point shaving scandal and its impact on the NBA, and Maccabi Tel Aviv.

== Film festivals ==
It premiered at the FilmFest DC International Film Festival, and was shown at over 25 other film festivals.

== Critical reception ==
The First Basket received generally excellent reviews from critics. As of October 2010, review aggregator Rotten Tomatoes reported that 67% of nine professional critics had given the film a positive review.

The Village Voice reviewer Ella Taylor, said of The First Basket:

The First Basket is more than a triumphalist screw-you to those who think Jews don't play sports. . . David Vyorst's clear-eyed, jaunty documentary briskly walks us through the history of American Jews in basketball.

Film Journal International reviewer Lewis Beale, said of The First Basket:

An important historical document. . . engrossing and fun.

== Music ==
The First Basket: Original Motion Picture Soundtrack

Soundtrack album by Roberto Juan Rodriguez
- Length: 44:43
- Label: Tzadik Records
- Producer: John Zorn

Professional ratings
Review scores
Source	Rating
Allmusic	4.5/5 stars

Roberto Juan Rodriguez was the musical director and composer on The First Basket: Original Motion Picture Soundtrack. He is a musician who synthesizes Cuban music and Jewish music.

== See also ==
- List of basketball films
- List of select Jewish basketball players
