= Lee Knorek =

American basketball player (1921–2003)

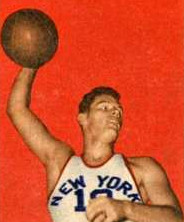
- Knorek in 1948

Personal information
- Born: July 15, 1921 Rossford, Ohio, U.S.
- Died: July 22, 2003 (aged 82) Rossford, Ohio, U.S.
- Listed height: 6 ft 7 in (2.01 m)
- Listed weight: 215 lb (98 kg)

Career information
- High school: Central Catholic (Toledo, Ohio)
- College: DeSales (OH); Detroit Mercy (1942–1943, 1946–1947)
- Playing career: 1946–1950
- Position: Center
- Number: 5, 19

Career history
- 1946–1949: New York Knicks
- 1949–1950: Baltimore Bullets
- Stats at NBA.com
- Stats at Basketball Reference

Leonard J. Knorek (July 15, 1921 – July 22, 2003) was an American professional basketball player. A 6'7" center, he spent the majority of his career with the New York Knicks of the Basketball Association of America. He was of Polish descent.

== Early life ==
Born in Rossford, Ohio, Knorek graduated from Central Catholic High School in 1939. He played basketball at DeSales College in Toledo until the school closed in 1942, the University of Detroit, then enlisted in the United States Navy to serve in the Pacific theater of World War II.

=== Birthplace ===
Although an Ohio native, Knorek's birthplace is listed in official NBA records as Warsaw, Poland. This is the result of a joke between Knorek and Paul Taylor as Knorek signed his contract with the Knicks. "When I signed my contract my friend had me put down Warsaw because he thought it was better," he later explained. Knorek did speak Polish, and teammate Nat Militzok recalled that Knorek once pretended to be an ambassador from Poland while staying at a hotel on a road trip.

== Professional career ==
After returning home at the end of the war, a friend, Paul Taylor, signed Knorek to the New York Knicks. He participated in the first BAA game, a November 1, 1946 contest between the Knicks and the Toronto Huskies. The Knicks won 68–66. Knorek remained with the Knicks until 1950, when he was sold to the Baltimore Bullets. He only played one game with the Bullets before quitting the team, claiming that he was hobbled by an old knee injury (though he later explained that he had grown too used to the "beautiful facilities" in New York.) The Bullets sued him for breach of contract in a case that lasted almost two years. Knorek eventually promised the Bullets that he would not play professional basketball with any team. He ended his NBA career with 873 career points.

== Later life ==
Knorek and his wife settled in Ohio, where he operated a liquor distribution company called Schenley Distillers. Knorek briefly returned to basketball in 1959 to join a team of retired players at the NBA All-Star Game. His team competed against a lineup of college all-stars, who won the game.

== BAA/NBA career statistics ==
Legend
GP	Games played	FG%	Field-goal percentage
FT%	Free-throw percentage	APG	Assists per game
PPG	Points per game	**Bold**	Career high

=== Regular season ===
Year	Team	GP	FG%	FT%	APG	PPG
1946–47	New York	22	.283	.653	1.0	**7.8**
1947–48	New York	48	.268	.508	1.0	5.4
1948–49	New York	**60**	**.341**	**.716**	**2.3**	7.4
1949–50	Baltimore	1	.000	.000	.0	.0
Career		131	.303	.637	1.6	6.7

=== Playoffs ===
Year	Team	GP	FG%	FT%	APG	PPG
1947	New York	5	.362	.579	1.6	10.6
1948	New York	3	**.412**	**.769**	**1.7**	**12.7**
1949	New York	**6**	.405	.563	**1.7**	6.5
Career		14	.388	.625	1.6	9.3
