= 1946–47 New York Knicks season =

Season of the Basketball Association of America (NBA) New York Knicks team

- Head coach: Neil Cohalan
- General manager: Ned Irish
- Owners: Ned Irish
- Arena: Madison Square Garden

Results
- Record: 33–27 (.550)
- Place: Division: 3rd (Eastern)
- Playoff finish: BAA Semifinals (lost to Warriors 0–2)

Local media
- Television: WCBS-TV/WNBT
- Radio: WHN

The 1946–47 New York Knickerbockers season was the first ever season of the franchise in the Basketball Association of America (BAA), now known as the National Basketball Association (NBA). The Knickerbockers, or Knicks in shorthand term, named for Father Knickerbocker (a popular symbol of New York), are one of only two teams of the original National Basketball Association still located in its original city (the other being the Boston Celtics), as well as are one of only three teams from the original BAA/NBA to still exist in the present day, with the Golden State Warriors being the third and final team still existing in the present era after previously being known as the Philadelphia Warriors. The Knickerbockers' first head coach was Neil Cohalan (who was considered the team's second choice for head coach behind former Original Celtics player and current (at the time) St. John's University men's basketball coach Joe Lapchick), with Ned Irish (who was well-known for being a stubborn, bossy micromanager) being their first general manager and owner for good measure. During their first season in the BAA/NBA, the Knickerbockers finished the season with a 33–27 record, being five games ahead of the Providence Steamrollers for the last playoff spot in their division. After defeating the Cleveland Rebels in the quarterfinal round, they would eventually get swept 2–0 in the semifinal round to the eventual inaugural champions of the league, the Philadelphia Warriors. Greater details on their first season would be explored in Charley Rosen's book called "The First Tip-Off: The Incredible Story of the Birth of the NBA", with an entire chapter dedicated to the Knickerbockers' first season in the BAA/NBA alongside the various highs and lows (mostly highs from this specific season) that would eventually lead to them becoming the franchise that they are today.

== Roster ==
Due to this being the first season in the franchise's history, the BAA didn't utilize a draft system like they would in future seasons of the BAA/NBA and instead relied upon some combination of the head coach and the general manager of the team finding and signing players in time to start out their training camp period for the season. For the Knickerbockers, team owner and general manager Ned Irish personally thought he knew better than either Joe Lapchick or head coach Neil Cohalan for players to add onto the opening season roster (primarily when it came to the notion of having local talents being included onto the team's inaugural roster), meaning he would overrule both of them on the final composition to start out the regular season. In this case, Ned Irish would see to it that Sonny Hertzberg from the City College of New York, Leo Gottlieb from DeWitt Clinton High School (and also supposedly attended the City College of New York as well), Tommy Byrnes from Seton Hall College, Ossie Schectman from Long Island University, Ralph Kaplowitz from New York University, Nat Militzok from Cornell University, Hank Rosenstein from the Boys High School in Brooklyn and the City College of New York, Bob Mullens from Fordham University, Stan Stutz from Rhose Island State University, Bob Cluggish from the University of Kentucky, and former Indianapolis Kautskys center Jake Weber from Purdue University would be a part of his opening roster, with many of them not only representing the state of New York, but also being Jewish as well.

1946–47 New York Knicks roster
Players

Pos.	No.	Player	Height	Weight	DOB	From
F	12 − 15	Aud Brindley	6 ft 4 in (1.93 m)	180 lb (82 kg)	1923-12-31	Dartmouth
G/F	14	Tommy Byrnes	6 ft 3 in (1.91 m)	240 lb (109 kg)	1923-02-19	Seton Hall
C	3	Bob Cluggish	6 ft 10 in (2.08 m)	235 lb (107 kg)	1917-09-18	Kentucky
F/C	10	Bob Fitzgerald	6 ft 5 in (1.96 m)	190 lb (86 kg)	1923-03-14	Seton Hall
F	4	Frido Frey	6 ft 2 in (1.88 m)	195 lb (88 kg)	1921-10-26	LIU Brooklyn
G	9	Leo Gottlieb	5 ft 11 in (1.80 m)	180 lb (82 kg)	1920-11-28	DeWitt Clinton HS (NY)
G	8	Sonny Hertzberg	5 ft 10 in (1.78 m)	175 lb (79 kg)	1922-07-29	CCNY
C	5 − 19	Lee Knorek	6 ft 7 in (2.01 m)	215 lb (98 kg)	1921-07-15	Detroit Mercy
G	5	Frank Mangiapane	5 ft 10 in (1.78 m)	195 lb (88 kg)	1925-08-05	NYU
F/C	16	Bud Palmer	6 ft 4 in (1.93 m)	180 lb (82 kg)	1921-07-14	Princeton
G	6	Ossie Schectman	6 ft 0 in (1.83 m)	175 lb (79 kg)	1919-03-30	LIU Brooklyn
G/F	7	Stan Stutz	5 ft 10 in (1.78 m)	175 lb (79 kg)	1920-04-14	Rhode Island
G/F	11 − 17	Butch van Breda Kolff	6 ft 3 in (1.91 m)	185 lb (84 kg)	1922-10-28	NYU

Coaches
Head coach
- Neil Cohalan

Legend
- (DP) Unsigned draft pick
- (FA) Free agent
- (S) Suspended
- Injured

== Regular season ==
The Knickerbockers' (and the BAA's) first ever game as the New York Knickerbockers was played on November 1, 1946, against the Toronto Huskies at Toronto's Maple Leaf Gardens, where the Knickerbockers won 68–66.

=== Season standings ===
#	Eastern Division				
#	Team	W	L	PCT	GB
1	x-Washington Capitols	49	11	.817	–
2	x-Philadelphia Warriors	35	25	.583	14
3	x-New York Knicks	33	27	.550	16
4	Providence Steamrollers	28	32	.467	21
5	Boston Celtics	22	38	.367	27
6	Toronto Huskies	22	38	.367	27

=== Game log ===
1946–47 game log
November

Game	Date	Opponent	Score	Location	High points	Record
1	November 1	@ Toronto	W 68–66	Maple Leaf Gardens	Leo Gottlieb (14)	1–0
2	November 2	@ Chicago	L 47–63	Chicago Stadium	Leo Gottlieb (12)	1–1
3	November 7	@ St. Louis	W 68–63	St. Louis Arena	Hertzberg, Schectman (11)	2–1
4	November 11	Chicago	L 68–78 (OT)	Madison Square Garden	Sonny Hertzberg (19)	2–2
5	November 16	Pittsburgh	W 64–62 (OT)	Madison Square Garden	Kaplowitz, Schectman (14)	3–2
6	November 18	Detroit	W 61–57	Madison Square Garden	Sonny Hertzberg (14)	4–2
7	November 20	Chicago	W 72–69	Madison Square Garden	Sonny Hertzberg (19)	5–2
8	November 23	Cleveland	W 82–76 (OT)	Madison Square Garden	Sonny Hertzberg (18)	6–2
9	November 25	@ Pittsburgh	W 62–46	Duquesne Gardens	Stan Stutz (15)	7–2
10	November 27	St. Louis	W 67–60	Madison Square Garden	Tommy Byrnes (17)	8–2
11	November 28	@ Providence	W 60–58	Rhode Island Auditorium	Tommy Byrnes (18)	9–2
12	November 30	Philadelphia	W 64–60 (OT)	Madison Square Garden	Tommy Byrnes (17)	10–2

December

Game	Date	Opponent	Score	Location	High points	Record
13	December 4	Detroit	W 70–57	Madison Square Garden	Ralph Kaplowitz (15)	11–2
14	December 5	@ Philadelphia	L 51–62	Philadelphia Arena	Ralph Kaplowitz (13)	11–3
15	December 7	@ Boston	W 90–65	Boston Garden	Stan Stutz (29)	12–3
16	December 8	Boston	W 62–44	Madison Square Garden	Stan Stutz (21)	13–3
17	December 11	Providence	W 83–68	Madison Square Garden	Sonny Hertzberg (16)	14–3
18	December 15	@ Cleveland	L 52–70	Cleveland Arena	Sonny Hertzberg (16)	14–4
19	December 18	Cleveland	L 53–56	Madison Square Garden	Leo Gottlieb (9)	14–5
20	December 20	@ Toronto	L 70–74	Maple Leaf Gardens	Sonny Hertzberg (22)	14–6
21	December 21	@ Providence	L 61–63	Rhode Island Auditorium	Stan Stutz (17)	14–7
22	December 28	@ Washington	L 49–70	Uline Arena	Sonny Hertzberg (12)	14–8

January

Game	Date	Opponent	Score	Location	High points	Record
23	January 4	@ Detroit	W 62–50	Detroit Olympia	Leo Gottlieb (22)	15–8
24	January 5	@ St. Louis	W 59–57	St. Louis Arena	Leo Gottlieb (21)	16–8
25	January 8	Toronto	L 63–76	Madison Square Garden	Leo Gottlieb (16)	16–9
26	January 10	@ Boston	L 62–66	Boston Garden	Bob Cluggish (10)	16–10
27	January 13	@ Pittsburgh	W 53–50	Duquesne Gardens	Ossie Schectman (19)	17–10
28	January 15	Washington	L 63–65	Madison Square Garden	Ossie Schectman (19)	17–11
29	January 18	Boston	L 45–58	Madison Square Garden	Sonny Hertzberg (10)	17–12
30	January 19	@ Cleveland	L 72–79	Cleveland Arena	Tommy Byrnes (18)	17–13
31	January 22	Chicago	W 74–64	Madison Square Garden	Tommy Byrnes (22)	18–13
32	January 25	Boston	L 46–52	Madison Square Garden	Bud Palmer (12)	18–14
33	January 29	Pittsburgh	W 64–60	Madison Square Garden	Bud Palmer (13)	19–14
34	January 30	@ Philadelphia	L 58–65	Philadelphia Arena	Bud Palmer (16)	19–15

February

Game	Date	Opponent	Score	Location	High points	Record
35	February 1	Philadelphia	L 63–71	Madison Square Garden	Palmer, Schectman (12)	19–16
36	February 2	@ Detroit	L 63–65	Detroit Olympia	Stan Stutz (22)	19–17
37	February 5	St. Louis	L 46–71	Madison Square Garden	Stan Stutz (8)	19–18
38	February 6	@ Boston	L 48–49	Boston Garden	Leo Gottlieb (8)	19–19
39	February 8	Toronto	W 69–46	Madison Square Garden	Bud Palmer (16)	20–19
40	February 12	Washington	W 76–72	Madison Square Garden	Lee Knorek (21)	21–19
41	February 15	Cleveland	L 84–90	Madison Square Garden	Ossie Schectman (18)	21–20
42	February 16	@ Detroit	W 66–58	Detroit Olympia	Palmer, Stutz (14)	22–20
43	February 19	Providence	L 62–69	Madison Square Garden	Ossie Schectman (16)	22–21
44	February 21	Pittsburgh	W 77–49	Madison Square Garden	Bud Palmer (15)	23–21
45	February 23	@ Chicago	L 68–82	Chicago Stadium	Ossie Schectman (18)	23–22
46	February 26	Washington	L 60–84	Madison Square Garden	Bud Palmer (13)	23–23
47	February 27	@ Providence	W 73–65	Rhode Island Auditorium	Stan Stutz (19)	24–23

March

Game	Date	Opponent	Score	Location	High points	Record
48	March 1	Toronto	W 63–48	Madison Square Garden	Bud Palmer (15)	25–23
49	March 6	@ Philadelphia	W 61–59	Philadelphia Arena	Ossie Schectman (14)	26–23
50	March 8	Detroit	W 64–61	Madison Square Garden	Bud Palmer (11)	27–23
51	March 13	St. Louis	W 78–74 (2OT)	Madison Square Garden	Knorek, Stutz (20)	28–23
52	March 15	@ Washington	L 63–78	Uline Arena	Leo Gottlieb (12)	28–24
53	March 16	@ Cleveland	W 81–69	Cleveland Arena	Sonny Hertzberg (21)	29–24
54	March 19	@ Chicago	W 65–57	Chicago Stadium	Sonny Hertzberg (16)	30–24
55	March 20	@ St. Louis	L 49–51	St. Louis Arena	Bud Palmer (11)	30–25
56	March 22	@ Washington	W 68–63	Uline Arena	Sonny Hertzberg (23)	31–25
57	March 24	@ Pittsburgh	W 65–51	Duquesne Gardens	Bud Palmer (20)	32–25
58	March 26	Providence	W 91–84 (2OT)	Madison Square Garden	Tommy Byrnes (22)	33–25
59	March 28	@ Toronto	L 61–71	Maple Leaf Gardens	Tommy Byrnes (14)	33–26
60	March 30	@ Philadelphia	L 72–76	Philadelphia Arena	Lee Knorek (17)	33–27

1946–47 Schedule

== Playoffs ==
1947 playoff game log
First Round: 2–1 (home: 2–0; road: 0–1)

Game	Date	Team	Score	High points	Location Attendance	Series
1	April 2	@ Cleveland	L 51–77	Lee Knorek (10)	Cleveland Arena	0–1
2	April 5	Cleveland	W 86–74	Stan Stutz (30)	Madison Square Garden III; 10,321	1–1
3	April 9	Cleveland	W 93–71	Bud Palmer (26)	Madison Square Garden III; 5,124	2–1

BAA Semifinals: 0–2 (home: 0–1; road: 0–1)

Game	Date	Team	Score	High points	Location	Series
1	April 12	@ Philadelphia	L 70–82	Lee Knorek (20)	Philadelphia Arena	0–1
2	April 14	Philadelphia	L 53–72	Tommy Byrnes (11)	Madison Square Garden III	0–2

1947 schedule

== Player statistics ==
Legend
GP	Games played	GS	Games started	MPG	Minutes per game
FG%	Field-goal percentage	3P%	3-point field-goal percentage	FT%	Free-throw percentage
RPG	Rebounds per game	APG	Assists per game	SPG	Steals per game
BPG	Blocks per game	PPG	Points per game

== Transactions ==
=== Trades ===
January 21, 1947	To New York Knicks Bob Fitzgerald	To Toronto Huskies Bob Mullens

=== Sales ===
Player	Date sold	New team
Jake Weber	December 2, 1946	Providence Steamrollers
Ralph Kaplowitz	January 16, 1947	Philadelphia Warriors
Hank Rosenstein	January 26, 1947	Providence Steamrollers
Nat Militzok	February, 1947	Toronto Huskies

== Season Profits ==
Throughout this season, the New York Knickerbockers only had an average total of 3,406 paid attendees per game, with net receipts totaling up to $204,043 for the season, which led to the New York franchise being the only team out of every single BAA team operating this season to actually earn a profit this season with an estimated total profit margin of around $20,000 at hand for this particular season of play. As a result of this surprising profit margin of theirs (at least when compared to every other BAA team operating at a loss for this season) combined with the Knickerbockers' performance throughout the season, New York would be one of six teams to fully confirm their interest in staying on board for another season while playing in the BAA. To this day, they join the Boston Celtics as the only inaugural BAA/NBA team to still operate in their original location, with the Golden State Warriors (formerly known as the Philadelphia Warriors) also being the only other BAA/NBA team from this time still existing in the present day.
