= List of New York Knicks head coaches =

The New York Knicks are an American professional basketball team based in New York City. They are a member of the Atlantic Division of the Eastern Conference in the National Basketball Association (NBA). They play their home games at Madison Square Garden. The franchise's official name "Knickerbockers" came from the style of pants Dutch settlers wore when they moved to America. Having joined the Basketball Association of America (BAA), the predecessor of the NBA, in 1946, the Knicks remain as one of the oldest teams in the NBA. During Red Holzman's tenure, the franchise won two NBA championships in 1970 and 1973.

There have been 31 head coaches for the New York Knicks franchise. Holzman was the franchise's first Coach of the Year winner and is the team's all-time leader in regular season games coached, regular season games won, playoff games coached, and playoff games won. Holzman was inducted into the Basketball Hall of Fame in 1986 as a coach. Besides Holzman, Rick Pitino, Don Nelson, Pat Riley, Lenny Wilkens, and Larry Brown have been inducted into the Basketball Hall of Fame as coaches. Four coaches have been named to the list of the top 10 coaches in NBA history. Neil Cohalan, Joe Lapchick, Vince Boryla, Carl Braun, Eddie Donovan and Herb Williams have spent their entire coaching careers with the Knicks. Boryla, Braun, Harry Gallatin, Dick McGuire, Willis Reed and Williams formerly played for the Knicks.

== Key ==
GC	Games coached
W	Wins
L	Losses
Win%	Winning percentage
#	Number of coaches (Note: A running total of the number of coaches of the Knicks. Thus, any coach who has two or more separate terms as head coach is only counted once.)
*	Spent entire NBA head coaching career with the Knicks
†	Elected into the Basketball Hall of Fame as a coach

== Coaches ==
Note: Statistics are correct through the end of the 2025–26 season.

#	Name	Term (Note: Each year is linked to an article about that particular NBA season.)	GC	W	L	Win%	GC	W	L	Win%	Achievements	Reference
#	Name	Term	Regular season				Playoffs				Achievements	Reference
1	Neil Cohalan*	1946–1947	60	33	27	.550	5	2	3	.400		
2	Joe Lapchick*	1947–1956	573	326	247	.569	60	30	30	.500		
3	Vince Boryla*	1956–1958	165	80	85	.485	—	—	—	—		
4	Andrew Levane	1958–1959	99	48	51	.485	2	0	2	.000		
5	Carl Braun*	1959–1961 (as player-coach)	127	40	87	.315	—	—	—	—		
6	Eddie Donovan*	1961–1965	278	84	194	.302	—	—	—	—		
7	Harry Gallatin	1965	63	25	38	.397	—	—	—	—		
8	Dick McGuire	1965–1967	177	75	102	.424	4	1	3	.250		
9	Red Holzman†	1967–1977	783	466	317	.595	95	54	41	.568	NBA Coach of the Year (1969–70); 2 championships (1970, 1973); One of the top 10 coaches in NBA history	
10	Willis Reed	1977–1978	96	49	47	.510	6	2	4	.333		
—	Red Holzman†	1978–1982	314	147	167	.468	2	0	2	.000	One of the top 10 coaches in NBA history	
11	Hubie Brown	1982–1986	344	142	202	.413	18	8	10	.444		
12	Bob Hill	1986–1987	66	20	46	.303	—	—	—	—		
13	Rick Pitino†	1987–1989	164	90	74	.549	13	6	7	.462		
14	Stu Jackson	1989–1990	97	52	45	.536	10	4	6	.400		
15	John MacLeod	1990–1991	67	32	35	.478	3	0	3	.000		
16	Pat Riley†	1991–1995	328	223	105	.680	63	35	28	.556	NBA Coach of the Year (1992–93); One of the top 10 coaches in NBA history	
17	Don Nelson†	1995–1996	59	34	25	.576	—	—	—	—	One of the top 10 coaches in NBA history	
18	Jeff Van Gundy	1996–2001	420	248	172	.590	69	37	32	.536		
19	Don Chaney	2001–2004	184	72	112	.391	—	—	—	—		
20	Herb Williams*	2004	1	1	0	1.000	—	—	—	—		
21	Lenny Wilkens†	2004–2005	81	40	41	.494	4	0	4	.000	One of the top 10 coaches in NBA history	
—	Herb Williams*	2005	43	16	27	.372	—	—	—	—		
22	Larry Brown†	2005–2006	82	23	59	.280	—	—	—	—		
23	Isiah Thomas	2006–2008	164	56	108	.341	—	—	—	—		
24	Mike D'Antoni	2008–2012	288	121	167	.420	4	0	4	.000		
25	Mike Woodson	2012–2014	188	109	79	.580	17	7	10	.412		
26	Derek Fisher*	2014–2016	136	40	96	.294	—	—	—	—		
27	Kurt Rambis	2016	28	9	19	.321	—	—	—	—		
28	Jeff Hornacek	2016–2018	164	60	104	.366	—	—	—	—		
29	David Fizdale	2018–2019	104	21	83	.202	—	—	—	—		
30	Mike Miller*	2019–2020	44	17	27	.386	—	—	—	—		
31	Tom Thibodeau	2020–2025	400	226	174	.565	47	24	23	.511	NBA Coach of the Year (2020–21)	
32	Mike Brown	2025–present	82	53	29	.646	19	16	3	.842	1 championship (2026)	

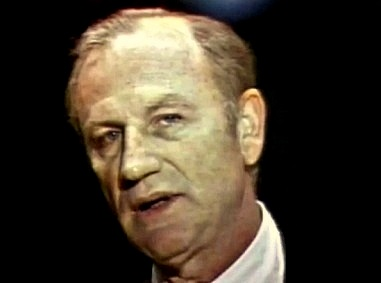
Red Holzman was the coach of the Knicks from 1967 to 1977, and again from 1978 to 1982. He was the NBA Coach of the Year in 1969–70, and won 2 championships in 1970 and 1973.

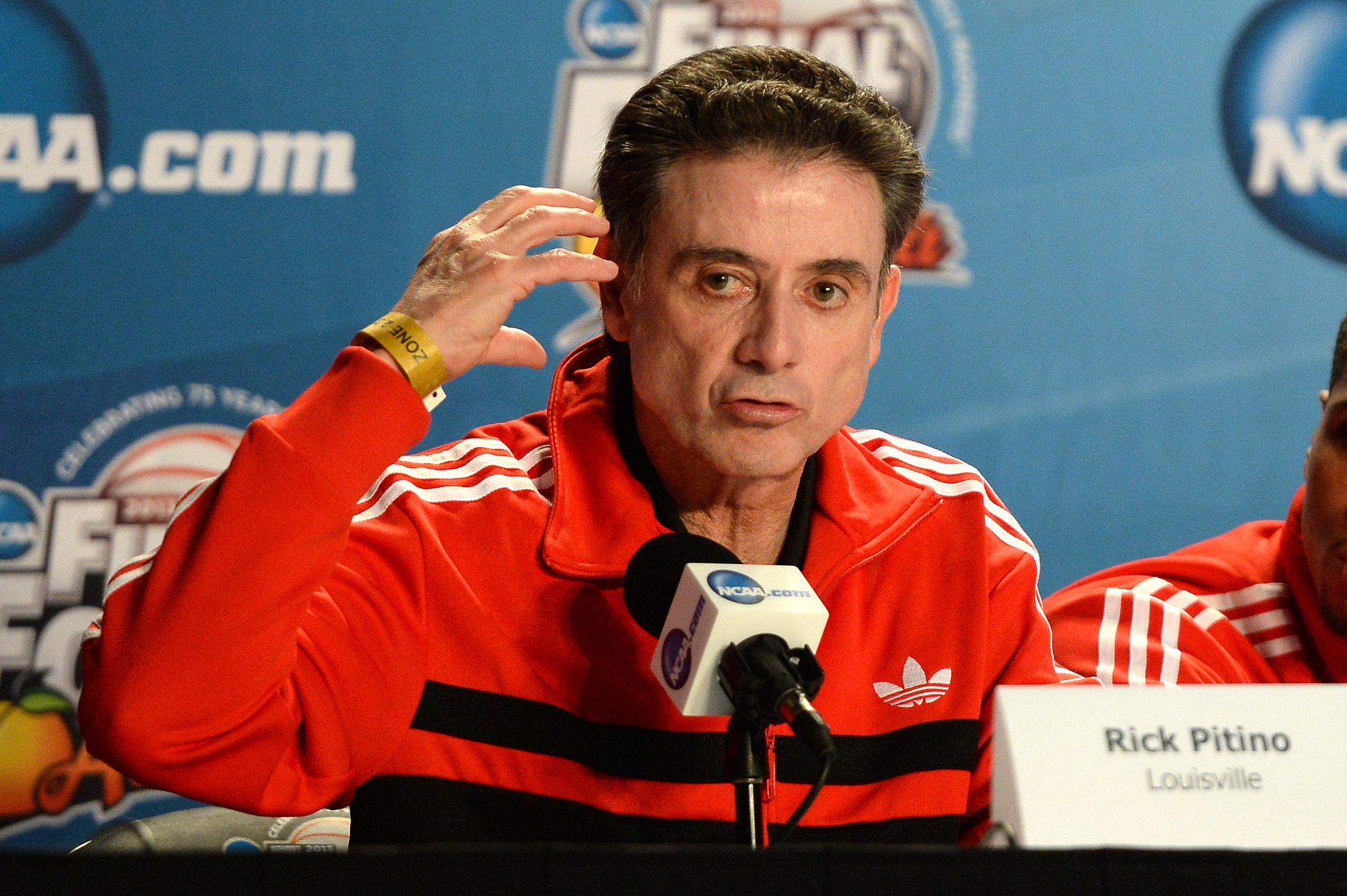
Rick Pitino was the coach of the Knicks from 1987 to 1989.

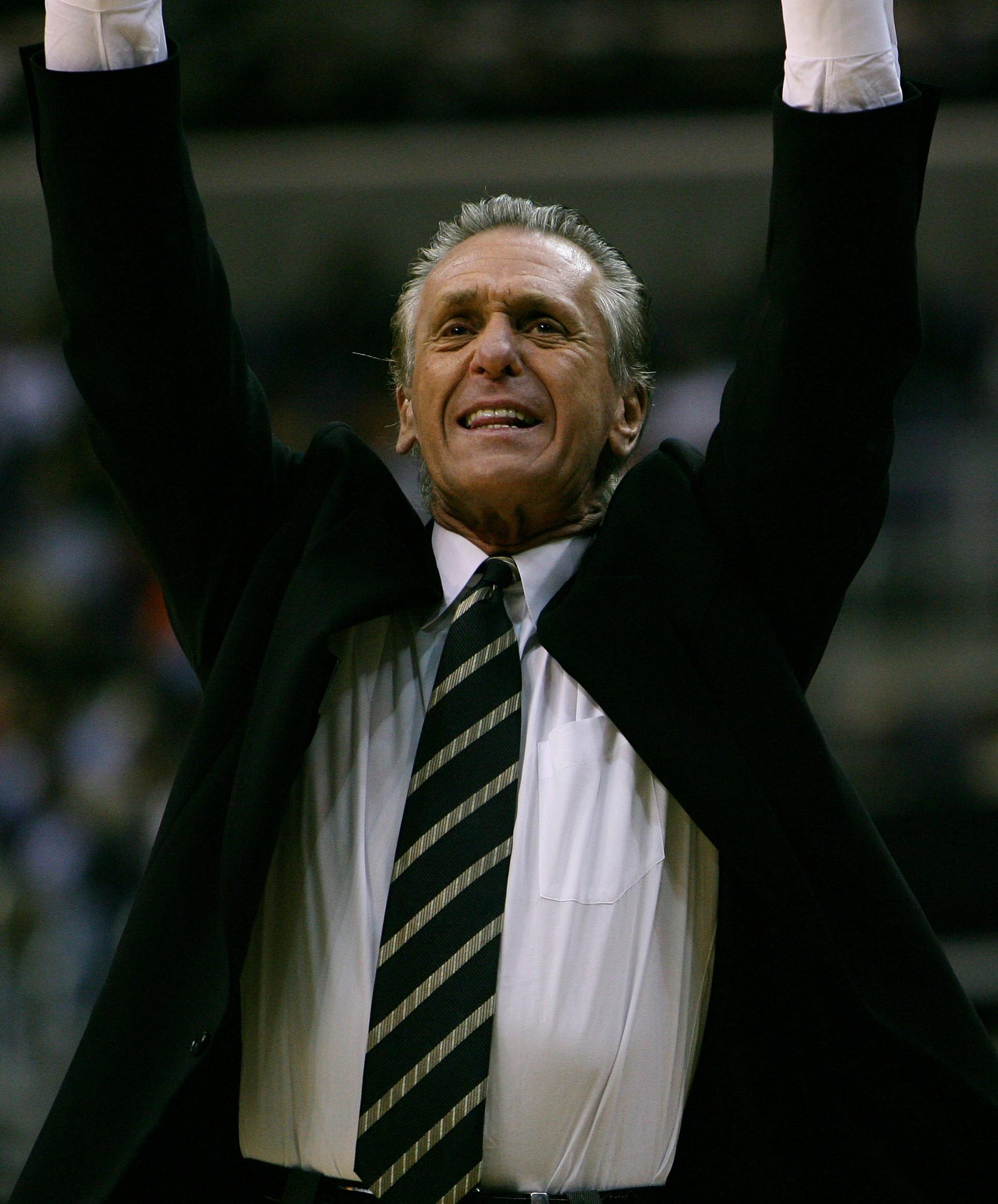
Pat Riley was the coach of the Knicks from 1991 to 1995, and was the NBA Coach of the Year in 1992–93.

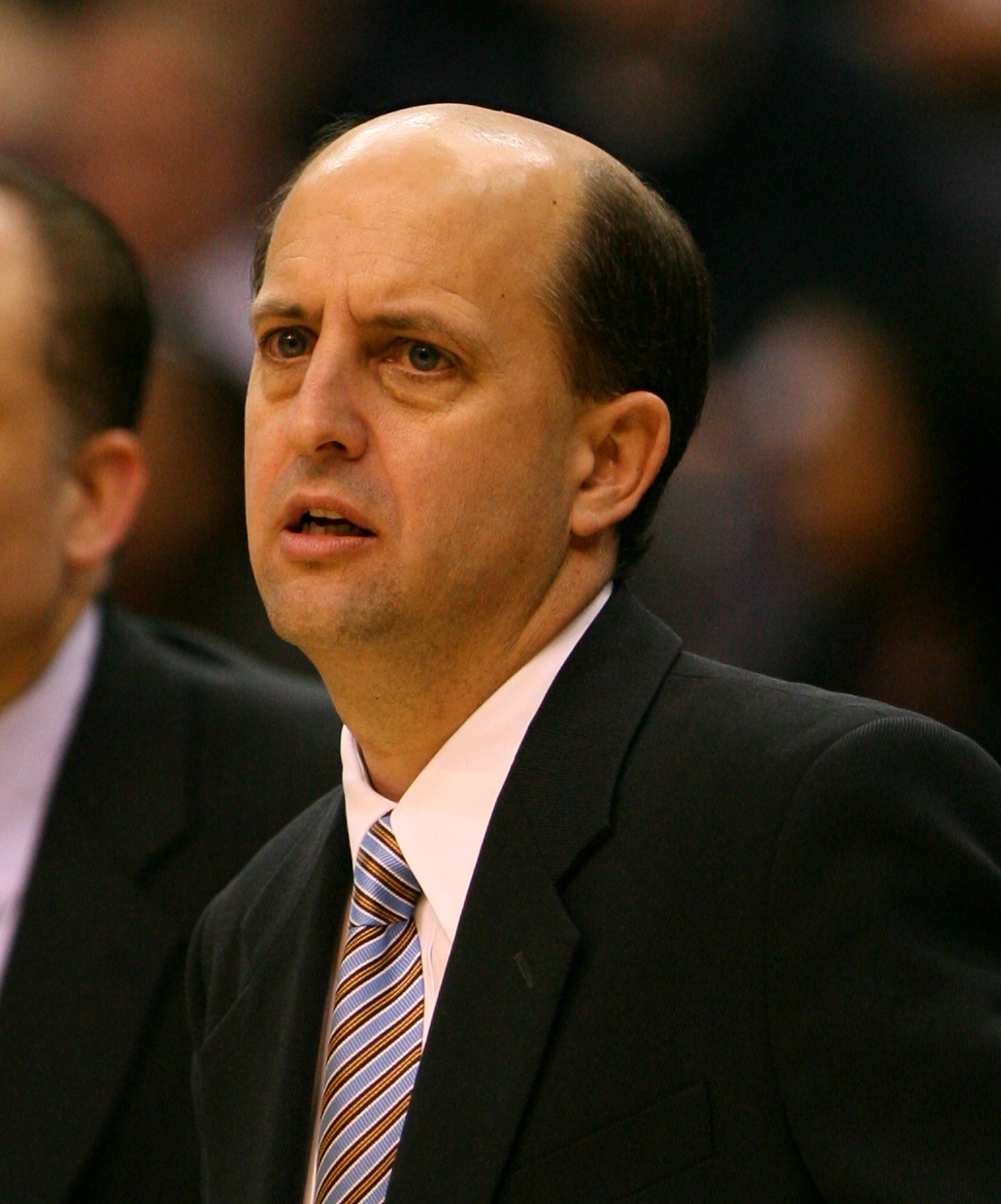
Jeff Van Gundy was the coach of the Knicks from 1996 to 2001.

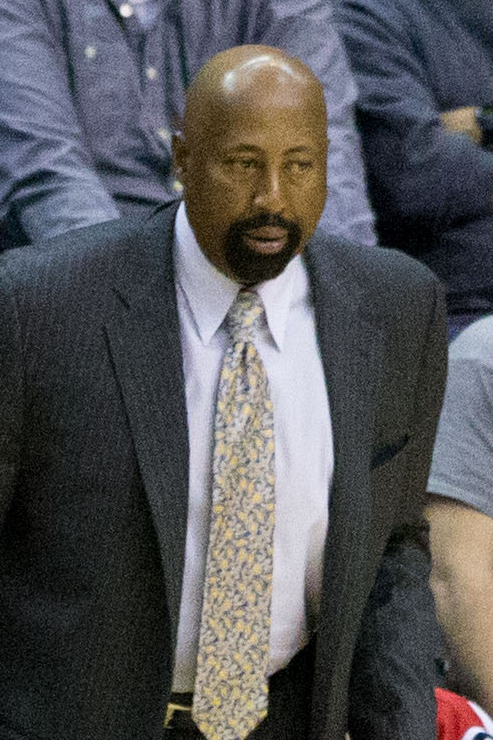
Mike Woodson was the coach of the Knicks from 2012 to 2014.

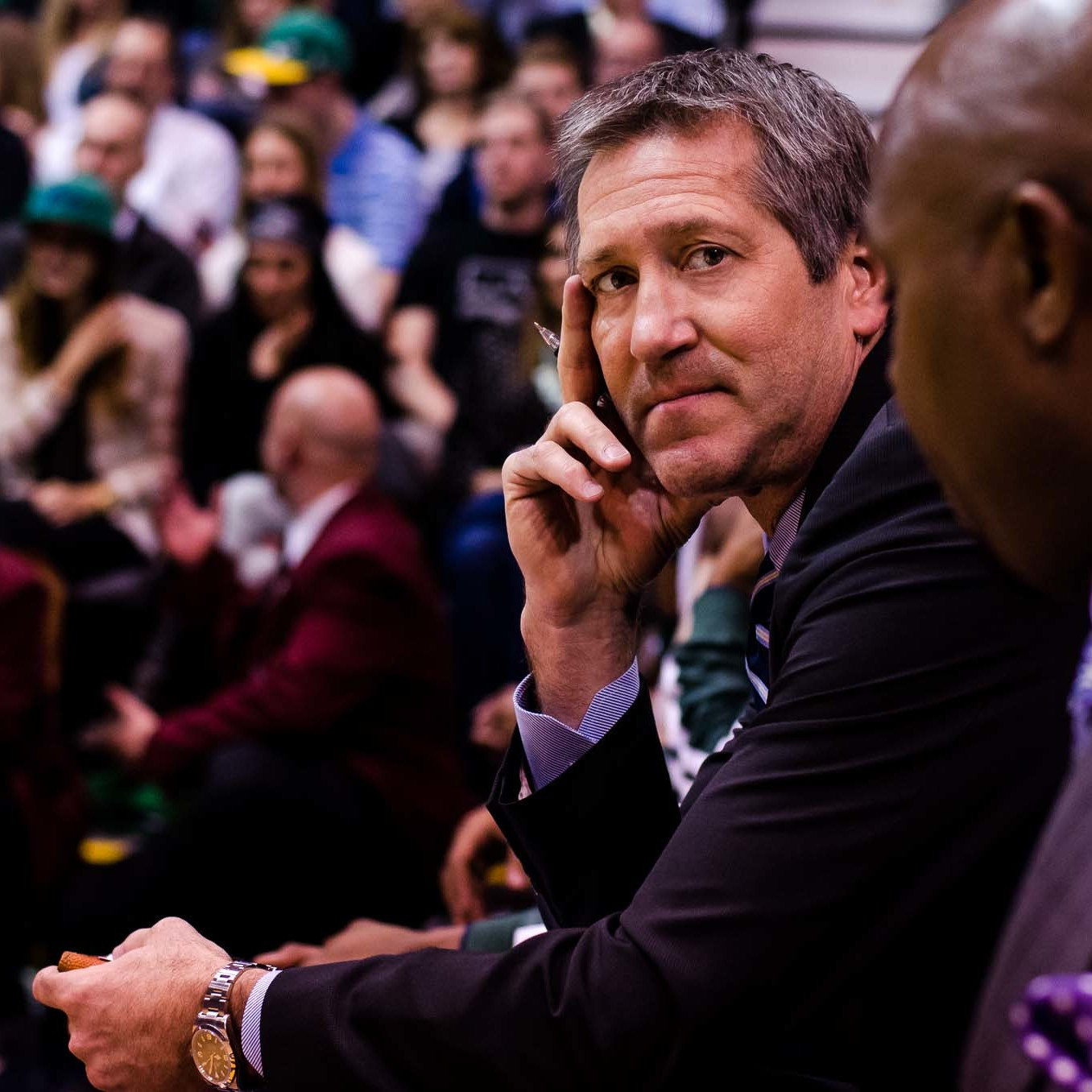
Jeff Hornacek was the coach of the Knicks from 2016 to 2018.

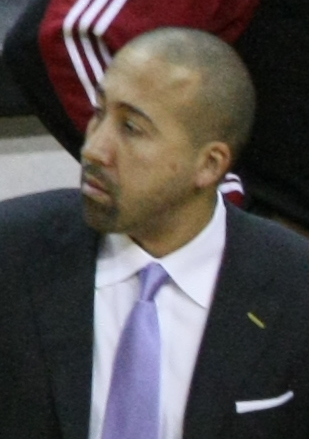
David Fizdale was the coach of the Knicks from 2018 to 2019.

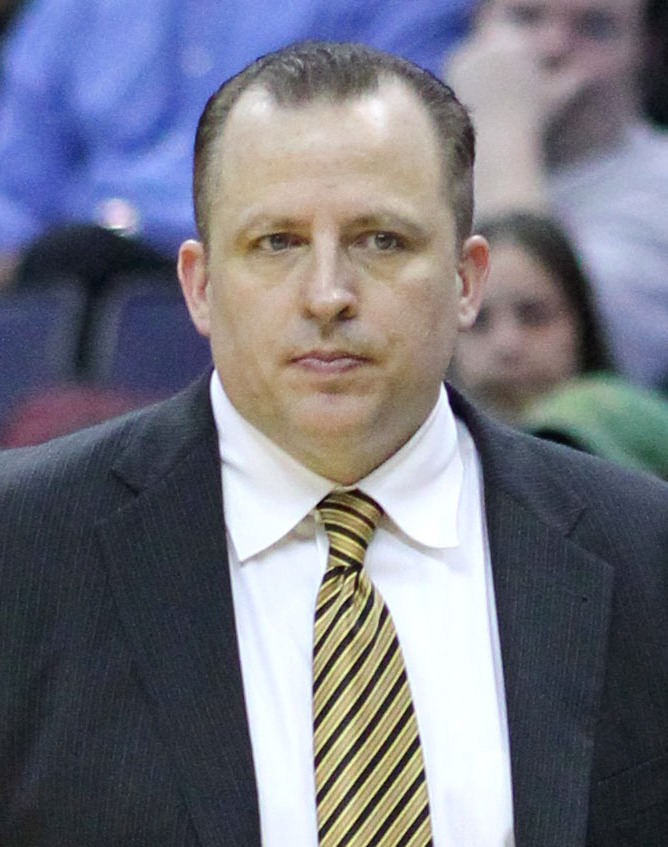
Tom Thibodeau was the coach of the Knicks from 2020 to 2025, and was the NBA Coach of the Year in 2020–21.

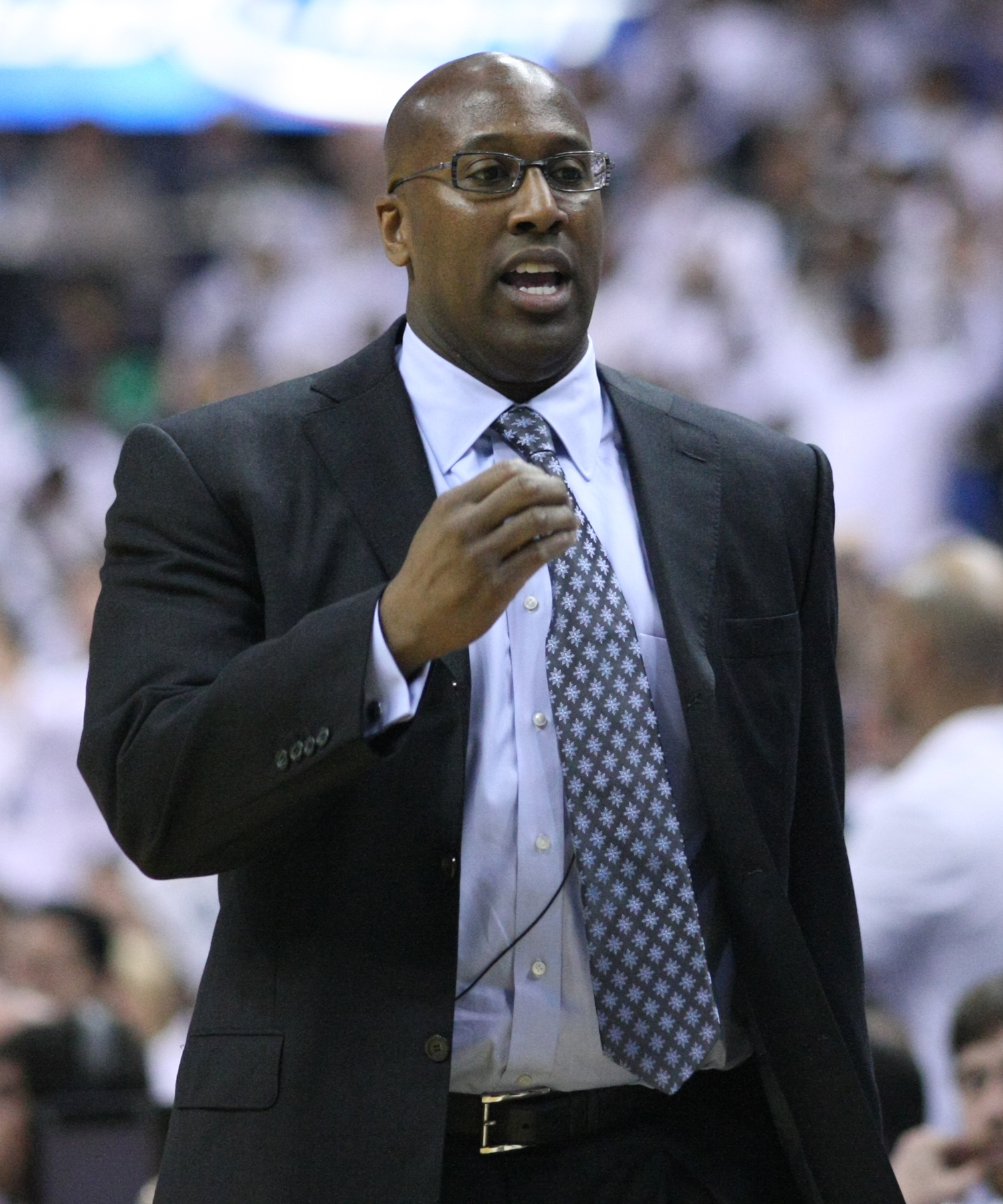
Mike Brown has been the coach of the Knicks since 2025, and won a championship in 2026.
