= Ray Kuka =

American basketball player (1922–1990)

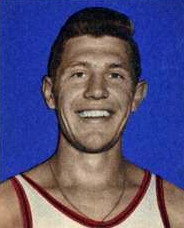
- Kuka in 1948

Personal information
- Born: February 17, 1922 Havre, Montana, U.S.
- Died: March 27, 1990 (aged 68) Havre, Montana, U.S.
- Listed height: 6 ft 3 in (1.91 m)
- Listed weight: 200 lb (91 kg)

Career information
- High school: Havre (Havre, Montana)
- College: Notre Dame (1940–1942); Montana State (1946–1947)
- BAA draft: 1947: undrafted
- Position: Forward
- Number: 12

Career history

Playing
- 1947–1949: New York Knicks

Coaching
- 1949: New York Knicks (interim HC)
- Stats at NBA.com
- Stats at Basketball Reference

Raphael Eugene "Ray" Kuka (February 17, 1922 – March 27, 1990) was an American professional basketball player. He played in the Basketball Association of America for the New York Knicks during the 1947–48 season and part of the 1948–49 season. Kuka also served briefly as the Knicks' interim head coach for a few games in February 1949. Joe Lapchick, the regular head coach, was hospitalized to treat a stomach disorder. Kuka had also previously served as a team scout.

Kuka played in college for Notre Dame before being drafted into the United States Air Force for World War II. After World War II he returned home and played for Montana State, where he earned all-conference honors.

Following his playing career, Kuka returned to hos hometown of Havre, Montana, where he was a successful high school coach and teacher.

== BAA career statistics ==
Legend
GP	Games played	FG%	Field-goal percentage
FT%	Free-throw percentage	APG	Assists per game
PPG	Points per game	**Bold**	Career high

=== Regular season ===
Year	Team	GP	FG%	FT%	APG	PPG
1947–48	New York	**44**	**.326**	**.595**	.6	**5.2**
1948–49	New York	8	.278	.556	**1.4**	3.1
Career		52	.320	.591	.7	4.9

=== Playoffs ===
Year	Team	GP	FG%	FT%	APG	PPG
1948	New York	3	.300	1.000	.0	2.7
Career		3	.300	1.000	.0	2.7
