= Dick Holub =

American basketball player and coach (1921–2009)

Personal information
- Born: October 29, 1921 Racine, Wisconsin, U.S.
- Died: July 27, 2009 (aged 87) Sun City West, Arizona, U.S.
- Listed height: 6 ft 6 in (1.98 m)
- Listed weight: 205 lb (93 kg)

Career information
- High school: Flushing (Flushing, New York)
- College: LIU Brooklyn (1940–1942, 1946–1947)
- BAA draft: 1947: 1st round, 5th overall pick
- Drafted by: New York Knicks
- Playing career: 1947–1952
- Position: Center
- Number: 11
- Coaching career: 1949–1966

Career history

Playing
- 1947–1948: New York Knicks
- 1949–1950: Paterson Crescents
- 1950–1951: Bridgeport Roesslers
- 1951–1952: Middletown Guards

Coaching
- 1949–1966: Fairleigh Dickinson

Career highlights
- Second-team All-American – Pic (1942)

Career BAA statistics
- Points: 504 (10.5 ppg)
- Games played: 48
- Stats at NBA.com
- Stats at Basketball Reference

Richard Wenzel Holub (October 29, 1921 – July 27, 2009) was an American basketball player and coach.

A 6'6" center born in Racine, Wisconsin, Holub played college basketball for the LIU Brooklyn Blackbirds, and was a member of their National Invitation Tournament (NIT) championship team in 1941. His college career was interrupted by a stint with the Air Force during World War II, but he returned to school in 1946, and led his team in scoring during the 1946–47 season.

After being drafted by the New York Knicks in the 1947 BAA draft, Holub spent the 1947–48 season with the team, then embarked upon a seventeen-year coaching career at Fairleigh Dickinson University. During his tenure as coach, he achieved a 233–167 record. He also taught English at Fairleigh Dickinson. In 1981, he became an academic adviser for the University of Connecticut's athletic department.

Holub died on July 27, 2009, in Sun City West, Arizona.

== BAA career statistics ==
Legend
| GP | Games played |
| FG% | Field-goal percentage |
| FT% | Free-throw percentage |
| APG | Assists per game |
| PPG | Points per game |

=== Regular season ===
| Year | Team | GP | FG% | FT% | APG | PPG |
|---|---|---|---|---|---|---|
| 1947–48 | New York | 48 | .295 | .633 | 0.8 | 10.5 |
| Career | | 48 | .295 | .633 | 0.8 | 10.5 |
