= Stanley Stutz =

American basketball player (1920–1975)

Personal information
- Born: April 14, 1920 Worcester, Massachusetts, U.S.
- Died: October 28, 1975 (aged 55) New Rochelle, New York, U.S.
- Listed height: 5 ft 10 in (1.78 m)
- Listed weight: 170 lb (77 kg)

Career information
- High school: Classical (Worcester, Massachusetts)
- College: Rhode Island (1938–1942)
- Playing career: 1943–1949
- Position: Guard / forward
- Number: 7, 5

Career history
- 1943–1944: New York Americans
- 1944–1946: Baltimore Bullets
- 1946–1948: New York Knicks
- 1948–1949: Baltimore Bullets

Career highlights
- ABL champion (1946); Helms Foundation Player of the Year (1942); 2× Consensus second-team All-American (1941, 1942); 3× NCAA scoring champion (1940–1942)
- Stats at NBA.com
- Stats at Basketball Reference

Stanley John Stutz (né Modzelewski; April 14, 1920 – October 28, 1975) was an American professional basketball player. He played college basketball for the Rhode Island Rams where he was known as Stanley "Stutz" Modzelewski. He adopted Stutz as his surname after his graduation in 1942. Stutz played professionally in the Basketball Association of America (BAA) for the Baltimore Bullets and New York Knicks.

== Early life ==
Stutz was born Stanley Modzelewski to a poor Polish family. He received the nickname "Stutz" as a child when he admired a friend's Stutz car. Modzelewski was raised in Worcester, Massachusetts, and started playing basketball in the fourth grade. He was taught how to play by former football player Archie Golembeski and was childhood friends with fellow basketball player Chet Jaworski. Modzelewski attended Classical High School in Worcester.

== Basketball career ==
Stutz was known as Stanley "Stutz" Modzelewski when he played for the Rhode Island Rams. He led the NCAA in scoring for three consecutive years from 1940 to 1942. He changed his surname to Stutz after he graduated in 1942.

Stutz then played three seasons (1946–1949) in the Basketball Association of America (BAA) as a member of the New York Knicks and Baltimore Bullets. He averaged 7.1 points per game in his BAA career.

== Later life ==
Stutz later coached the Washington Tapers of the American Basketball League. Stutz quit playing in 1949, but in 1950 returned to the court as a referee in the NBA, staying until 1959. He went into the corporate world, becoming a vice-president at Tucl Cellophane Tape in New York City.

Stutz was married and had three children. He died on October 28, 1975.

== BAA career statistics ==
Legend
GP	Games played	FG%	Field-goal percentage
FT%	Free-throw percentage	APG	Assists per game
PPG	Points per game	**Bold**	Career high

=== Regular season ===
Year	Team	GP	FG%	FT%	APG	PPG
1946–47	New York	**60**	.268	.782	.8	**8.0**
1947–48	New York	47	.218	**.837**	1.2	7.0
1948–49	Baltimore	59	**.281**	.824	**1.4**	6.3
Career		166	.256	.813	1.1	7.1

=== Playoffs ===
Year	Team	GP	FG%	FT%	APG	PPG
1947	New York	**5**	**.277**	**.875**	**1.4**	**16.8**
1948	New York	3	.273	.818	.3	5.0
1949	Baltimore	3	.200	.500	.0	1.7
Career		11	.274	.816	.7	9.5
