= Tommy Byrnes =

American basketball player (1923–1981)

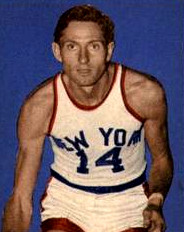
- Byrnes in 1948

Personal information
- Born: February 19, 1923 Teaneck, New Jersey, U.S.
- Died: January 9, 1981 (aged 57)
- Listed height: 6 ft 3 in (1.91 m)
- Listed weight: 175 lb (79 kg)

Career information
- High school: DeWitt Clinton (The Bronx, New York)
- College: Seton Hall
- Playing career: 1946–1951
- Position: Small forward / shooting guard
- Number: 14, 22, 5, 12

Career history
- 1946–1949: New York Knicks
- 1949: Indianapolis Jets
- 1949–1950: Baltimore Bullets
- 1950: Washington Capitols
- 1951: Tri-Cities Blackhawks
- Stats at NBA.com
- Stats at Basketball Reference

Thomas Patrick Byrnes (February 19, 1923 – January 9, 1981) was an American professional basketball player. He played collegiately for the Seton Hall Pirates.

He began his professional career playing for the New York Knicks of the Basketball Association of America for three seasons, before being traded to the Indianapolis Jets with cash considerations for Ray Lumpp on January 26, 1949. He spent his final two seasons playing for the Baltimore Bullets, Washington Capitols and Tri-Cities Blackhawks in the NBA.

== BAA/NBA career statistics ==
Legend
GP	Games played	FG%	Field-goal percentage
FT%	Free-throw percentage	RPG	Rebounds per game
APG	Assists per game	PPG	Points per game
**Bold**	Career high

=== Regular season ===
Year	Team	GP	FG%	FT%	RPG	APG	PPG
1946–47	New York	**60**	.300	.644	–	.6	7.6
1947–48	New York	47	.285	.631	–	.4	6.4
1948–49	New York	35	.285	.568	–	1.5	5.7
1948–49	Indianapolis	22	.325	.676	–	**2.2**	**9.6**
1949–50	Baltimore	53	.302	.702	–	1.7	6.2
1950–51	Baltimore	16	**.350**	.714	**1.7**	1.3	5.6
1950–51	Washington	12	.200	.519	.9	1.3	3.3
1950–51	Tri-Cities	19	.324	**.724**	**1.7**	1.7	4.6
Career		264	.299	.648	1.5	1.2	6.5

=== Playoffs ===
Year	Team	GP	FG%	FT%	RPG	APG	PPG
1947	New York	**5**	.239	.182	–	.0	4.8
1948	New York	3	**.407**	**.333**	–	**.7**	**8.7**
Career		8	.301	.261	–	.3	6.3
