= Bud Palmer =

American basketball player (1921–2013)

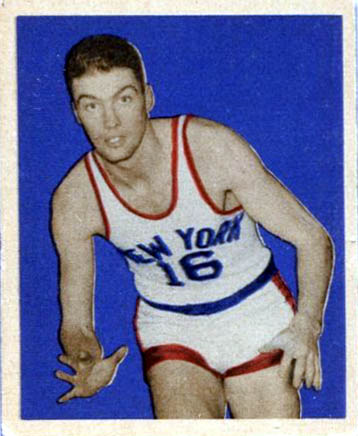
- Palmer in 1948

Personal information
- Born: September 14, 1921 Hollywood, California, U.S.
- Died: March 19, 2013 (aged 91) West Palm Beach, Florida, U.S.
- Listed height: 6 ft 4 in (1.93 m)
- Listed weight: 180 lb (82 kg)

Career information
- High school: Hun School (Princeton, New Jersey); Phillips Exeter (Exeter, New Hampshire)
- College: Princeton (1941–1943)
- Playing career: 1946–1949
- Position: Power forward / center
- Number: 16

Career history
- 1946–1949: New York Knicks
- Stats at NBA.com
- Stats at Basketball Reference

John Shove "Bud" Palmer (born John Palmer Flynn; September 14, 1921 – March 19, 2013) was an American professional basketball player and sportscaster. He was a member of the New York Knicks during the team's first three seasons in the Basketball Association of America and was the leading scorer in the team's inaugural 1946–47 season. Palmer is considered to be one of the inventors of the jump shot.

Born in Hollywood, California, Palmer was the son of football player and actor Maurice Bennett "Lefty" Flynn and singer Blanche Palmer. He was nicknamed "Bud" due to being the budding image of his father; Palmer relinquished his father's surname from his name when his parents divorced. Palmer was 5 ft 4 in (1.63 m) when he started playing basketball at Hun School of Princeton, and started using the jump shot to compensate for his height. He grew a foot taller to 6 ft 4 in (1.93 m) by the time he began playing college basketball at Princeton University, and played for three seasons before he enlisted in the U.S. Navy during World War II.

After his NBA career ended, Palmer went on to have a successful career as a sportscaster. He was Chief of Protocol and Official Greeter for the City of New York for seven years during John Lindsay's administration. Palmer modeled menswear, advertised Vitalis hair tonic, and wrote as an advice columnist in Glamour magazine.

Palmer died at 91 of metastatic prostate cancer in 2013 in West Palm Beach, Florida.

== BAA career statistics ==
Legend
GP	Games played	FG%	Field-goal percentage
FT%	Free-throw percentage	APG	Assists per game
PPG	Points per game	**Bold**	Career high

=== Regular season ===
Year	Team	GP	FG%	FT%	APG	PPG
1946–47	New York	42	.307	.669	0.8	9.5
1947–48	New York	48	.315	.744	0.9	**13.0**
1948–49	New York	**58**	**.350**	**.762**	**1.9**	12.3
Career		148	.326	.739	1.3	11.7

=== Playoffs ===
Year	Team	GP	FG%	FT%	APG	PPG
1947	New York	5	.351	.600	0.8	**15.6**
1948	New York	3	.421	**.769**	0.0	14.0
1949	New York	**6**	**.422**	.771	**1.7**	13.5
Career		14	.388	.721	1.0	14.4
