= Aud Brindley =

American basketball player

Personal information
- Born: December 31, 1923 Mineola, New York, US
- Died: November 19, 1957 (aged 33)
- Listed height: 6 ft 4 in (1.93 m)
- Listed weight: 175 lb (79 kg)

Career information
- High school: Rockville (Rockville Centre, New York)
- College: Dartmouth (1942–1944, 1946)
- Playing career: 1947–1947
- Position: Forward
- Number: 12, 15

Career history
- 1947: New York Knicks

Career highlights
- Consensus first-team All-American (1944)
- Stats at NBA.com
- Stats at Basketball Reference

Audley Brindley (December 31, 1923 – November 19, 1957) was an American basketball player. He played college basketball for Dartmouth College, and played professionally for the New York Knicks in the 1946–47 season for 12 games.

== BAA career statistics ==
Legend
GP	Games played
FG%	Field-goal percentage
FT%	Free-throw percentage
APG	Assists per game
PPG	Points per game

=== Regular season ===
Year	Team	GP	FG%	FT%	APG	PPG
1946–47	New York	12	.286	.857	.1	2.8
Career		12	.286	.857	.1	2.8

=== Playoffs ===
Year	Team	GP	FG%	FT%	APG	PPG
1946–47	New York	3	.500	.667	.0	3.3
Career		3	.500	.667	.0	3.3
