= Neil Cohalan =

American basketball coach (1906–1968)

Biographical details
- Born: July 31, 1906; Bronx, New York, U.S.
- Died: January 22, 1968 (aged 61)

Playing career

Football
- c. 1927: Manhattan

Basketball
- 1924–1928: Manhattan
- Position: Quarterback (football)

Coaching career (HC unless noted)

Basketball
- 1929–1942: Manhattan
- 1946–1947: New York Knicks

Head coaching record
- Overall: 165–82 (college); 33–27 (BAA)

Cornelius Joseph "Neil" Cohalan (July 31, 1906 – January 22, 1968) was an American basketball coach. He was the interim coach of the New York Knicks in their first season. Joe Lapchick had been tapped as coach, but opted to stay at St. John's for one more season.

Cohalan was the winning coach of the first game played in the Basketball Association of America (BAA), the forerunner to the National Basketball Association (NBA). The game, a November 1, 1946 contest between the Knicks and the Toronto Huskies played in the Maple Leaf Gardens, was won 68–66 by the Knickerbockers.

Prior to his pro career, Cohalan was the head basketball coach at Manhattan College from 1924 through 1942, where as a student he played basketball and football.

== Head coaching record ==
Legend
Regular season	G	Games coached	W	Games won	L	Games lost	W–L %	Win–loss %
Playoffs	PG	Playoff games	PW	Playoff wins	PL	Playoff losses	PW–L %	Playoff win–loss %

Team	Year	G	W	L	W–L%	Finish	PG	PW	PL	PW–L%	Result
New York	1946–47	60	33	27	.550	3rd in Eastern	5	2	3	.400	Lost in Semifinals
