= Bob Cluggish =

American basketball player (1917–2008)

Personal information
- Born: September 18, 1917 Marion, Kentucky, U.S.
- Died: September 5, 2008 (aged 90) Maitland, Florida, U.S.
- Listed height: 6 ft 10 in (2.08 m)
- Listed weight: 235 lb (107 kg)

Career information
- High school: Corbin (Corbin, Kentucky)
- College: Kentucky (1938–1940)
- Position: Center
- Number: 3

Career history
- 1946–1947: New York Knicks
- Stats at NBA.com
- Stats at Basketball Reference

Robert Marion Cluggish (September 18, 1917 – September 5, 2008) was an American professional basketball player. He played college basketball for the Kentucky Wildcats and for the New York Knicks in the Basketball Association of America (BAA) for 54 games during the 1946–47 season. He worked at Howard High School in Orlando where the gym was named after him when he retired.

== BAA career statistics ==
Legend
GP	Games played
FG%	Field-goal percentage
FT%	Free-throw percentage
APG	Assists per game
PPG	Points per game

=== Regular season ===
Year	Team	GP	FG%	FT%	APG	PPG
1946–47	New York	54	.261	.571	.4	4.4
Career		54	.261	.571	.4	4.4

=== Playoffs ===
Year	Team	GP	FG%	FT%	APG	PPG
1946–47	New York	5	.148	.000	.0	1.6
Career		5	.148	.000	.0	1.6
