= Jake Weber (basketball) =

American basketball player (1918–1990)

Personal information
- Born: March 18, 1918 Rushville, Indiana, U.S.
- Died: January 6, 1990 (aged 71)
- Listed height: 6 ft 6 in (1.98 m)
- Listed weight: 225 lb (102 kg)

Career information
- High school: Plainfield (Plainfield, Indiana)
- College: Purdue (1938–1941)
- Playing career: 1945–1947
- Position: Center
- Number: 11, 9, 5

Career history
- 1945–1946: Indianapolis Kautskys
- 1946: New York Knicks
- 1946–1947: Providence Steamrollers
- Stats at NBA.com
- Stats at Basketball Reference

Forest John "Jake" Weber (March 18, 1918 – January 6, 1990) was an American professional basketball player. He played for the New York Knicks and the Providence Steamrollers during the 1946–47 season. He averaged 3.5 points and 0.1 assists per game.

== BAA career statistics ==
Legend
GP	Games played	FG%	Field-goal percentage
FT%	Free-throw percentage	APG	Assists per game
PPG	Points per game	**Bold**	Career high

=== Regular season ===
Year	Team	GP	FG%	FT%	APG	PPG
1946–47	New York	11	**.292**	**.750**	**.1**	1.8
1946–47	Providence	**39**	**.292**	.690	**.1**	**3.9**
Career		50	.292	.696	.1	3.5
