= Leo Gottlieb =

American basketball player

Personal information
- Born: November 28, 1920 New York City, New York, U.S.
- Died: August 16, 1972 (aged 51)
- Listed height: 5 ft 11 in (1.80 m)
- Listed weight: 180 lb (82 kg)

Career information
- High school: DeWitt Clinton (Bronx, New York)
- Playing career: 1939–1948
- Position: Guard
- Number: 9

Career history
- 1939–1940: Philadelphia Sphas
- 1940–1942: New York Jewels
- 1943–1944: New York Americans
- 1945–1946: New York Gothams
- 1946–1948: New York Knicks
- Stats at NBA.com
- Stats at Basketball Reference

Leo "Ace" Gottlieb (November 28, 1920 – August 16, 1972) was an American professional basketball player.

== Early and personal life ==
Gottlieb, who was German Jewish, was born in New York City, New York. He attended DeWitt Clinton High School in The Bronx, New York.

Gottlieb was the uncle of Ron Rothstein, the very first head coach of the Miami Heat.

== Basketball career ==
Gottlieb played guard. He played for the Philadelphia Sphas in the ABL in 1939–40, the New York Jewels in 1940–42, the New York Americans in 1943–44, and the New York Gothams in 1945–46.

He made his debut in the National Basketball Association on November 1, 1946. He played for the New York Knicks in the first game in NBA history, on November 1, 1946, scoring (14 points). He played for the Knicks from 1946 to 1948.

== BAA career statistics ==
Legend
| GP | Games played | FG% | Field-goal percentage |
| FT% | Free-throw percentage | APG | Assists per game |
| PPG | Points per game | **Bold** | Career high |

=== Regular season ===
| Year | Team | GP | FG% | FT% | APG | PPG |
|---|---|---|---|---|---|---|
| 1946–47 | New York | **57** | **.302** | **.655** | **.4** | **5.9** |
| 1947–48 | New York | 27 | .259 | .619 | **.4** | 4.9 |
| Career | | 84 | .288 | .645 | .4 | 5.5 |

=== Playoffs ===
| Year | Team | GP | FG% | FT% | APG | PPG |
|---|---|---|---|---|---|---|
| 1946–47 | New York | 4 | .256 | .667 | .3 | 6.0 |
| Career | | 4 | .256 | .667 | .3 | 6.0 |
