= Ned Irish =

American basketball team owner (1905–1982)

Edward Simmons Irish (May 6, 1905 – January 21, 1982) was an American basketball promoter and one of the key figures in popularizing professional basketball. He was the founder and president of the New York Knicks from 1946 to 1974. He was enshrined in the Naismith Memorial Basketball Hall of Fame in 1964. Cary Elwes portrayed him in the 2023 movie Sweetwater.

== Early life and career ==
Irish was born in Lake George, New York. His father died when he was three years old and his mother, a nurse, moved with him to Brooklyn, where he attended Erasmus Hall High School. He graduated from the University of Pennsylvania in 1928 and began working as a sports journalist for the New York World-Telegram. To supplement his income, in 1930 he began working in public relations for the New York Giants football team. That job led him to run the National Football League's information bureau during the 1930s.

== Basketball ==
While at the World-Telegram, Irish covered basketball games in the small 500–1,000 seat gymnasiums of the day. He often told a story of covering a game at Manhattan College where the crowd so overwhelmed the tiny gym that he had to climb in through a window, tearing the pants of the best suit he owned. Whether the story was true or not, he told it often and it became associated with his drive to expand the game of basketball to meet the appetite of fans for it.

In 1934 he left the newspaper business to promote basketball games at Madison Square Garden. As this was during the Great Depression and the venue was often going unused, Irish was able to book events without putting up his own money so long as attendance at least covered the nightly rent. His first event, NYU against Notre Dame, earned him more money than he made in six months as a sportswriter.

As the Madison Square Garden games became popular showcases and most major college teams were eager to be booked, Irish was able to insist on terms favorable to him. His promotions of college matchups were important to growing the popularity of basketball at a time before there was an established professional league. In the fallout of the 1951 CCNY point-shaving scandal, which was centered at Madison Square Garden, New York City District Attorney Frank Hogan issued a report saying "the blatant commercialism which had permeated college basketball" was an underlying cause. Irish denied any responsibility and claimed Hogan was seeking publicity.

In 1946, Irish was one of the 11 founders of the Basketball Association of America, which merged with the National Basketball League three years later to become the National Basketball Association (the modern NBA). Irish successfully vied to get the franchise over Max Kase on the strength of his ties to Madison Square Garden. He insisted that home teams keep their own admissions revenue, which was advantageous to teams in major markets such as the Knicks. Irish made more money off college basketball promotions into the 1950s, and referred to the Knicks as a "tax write-off".

To get his way in negotiations against other teams, Irish would threaten to fold the Knicks, which in the early days would have been devastating to small-market teams. This became a less credible threat by the 1960s, when the Knicks were very profitable for Madison Square Garden. When the American Basketball Association was competing against the NBA in the late 1960s, he was an early advocate for merger, arguing that teams in rival leagues bidding for players would lead to contracts that couldn't be sustained by team revenues. The leagues merged in 1976.

Irish served as president of the Knicks from 1946 until 1974. He was mostly known as a hands-off president, as his skills lay in promotion rather than technical knowledge of the game. After initial coach Joe Lapchick left, Irish did take a more direct role but the team struggled. After Red Holzman became coach, Irish took a less active role again. Knicks analyst Alan Hahn wrote that Irish was not "beloved" and was known as cold and unapproachable.

== Legacy ==
Irish was elected to the Basketball Hall of Fame in 1964.
