= Ossie Schectman =

American basketball player (1919–2013)

- Schectman in 1946

Personal information
- Born: March 30, 1919 New Brunswick, New Jersey, U.S.
- Died: July 30, 2013 (aged 94) Delray Beach, Florida, U.S.
- Listed height: 6 ft 0 in (1.83 m)
- Listed weight: 175 lb (79 kg)

Career information
- High school: Samuel J. Tilden (Brooklyn, New York)
- College: LIU Brooklyn (1938–1941)
- Playing career: 1941–1948
- Position: Shooting guard / small forward
- Number: 24

Career history
- 1941–1946: Philadelphia Sphas
- 1946–1947: New York Knicks
- 1947–1948: Paterson Crescents

Career highlights
- All-ABL First Team (1948); Consensus second-team All-American (1941)
- Stats at NBA.com
- Stats at Basketball Reference

Oscar Benjamin "Ossie" Schectman (March 30, 1919 – July 30, 2013) was an American professional basketball player. He is credited with having scored the first basket in the Basketball Association of America (BAA), which would later become the National Basketball Association (NBA).

== Early life and career ==
Schectman was born on March 30, 1919, in New Brunswick, New Jersey. His parents were Jewish immigrants from Russia. He had three siblings. He played basketball and baseball while attending Samuel J. Tilden High School in Brooklyn, New York, and played under coach Clair Bee at Long Island University. He was a member of the team in 1939, when they won the National Invitation Tournament and National Championship. He was named to the Converse All-American first team in 1941.

== Professional career ==
=== Philadelphia Sphas (1941–1946) ===
After obtaining his degree from LIU, Schectman played for Eddie Gottlieb's Philadelphia Sphas in the American Basketball League. The Sphas joined the ABL in 1933 and won the league championship in 1942–43. He was second in the league in scoring with 199 points (10.5 average) in 1943–44. He played with the Sphas until 1946, when he joined the New York Knicks of the Basketball Association of America.

=== New York Knicks (1946–1947) ===
On November 1, 1946, in the first ever game of the Basketball Association of America (BAA) which later on became the NBA, Schectman made the first basket when the Knicks played the Toronto Huskies at Toronto's Maple Leaf Gardens. The Knicks won the game 68–66. Schectman's basket is considered the first in NBA history. Schectman played 54 games for the Knicks in his one season with the team. He suffered a serious internal injury in a game in Chicago in March, 1947. In that one season, Schectman averaged 8.1 points per game, ranking 39th in the league. This helped him have the highest win share for his team. Schectman ended his BAA career with 435 points.

=== Paterson Crescents (1947–1948) ===
Schectman joined the Paterson Crescents of the ABL. The team won the league championship in 1947–48, and Schectman was named to the All-ABL first team.

== Later life and death ==
He was made a member of the National Jewish Sports Hall of Fame in 1998 and the Long Island University Athletic Hall of Fame in 2001. He was also inducted into the New York City Basketball Hall of Fame. Schectman appeared in the 2008 documentary film The First Basket.

On April 27, 2013, Schectman gave his very last autograph to young NBA fans who came to visit him in his home for the elderly in New City, New York. At the time of the visit Schechtman was watching the triple-overtime Game 4 of the first round NBA playoff series between the Chicago Bulls and Brooklyn Nets.

On July 30, 2013, Schectman died at age 94 in Delray Beach, Florida. He was survived by his sons Stewart and Peter, his sister and two grandchildren.

== BAA career statistics ==
Legend
GP	Games played
FG%	Field-goal percentage
FT%	Free-throw percentage
APG	Assists per game
PPG	Points per game

=== Regular season ===
Year	Team	GP	FG%	FT%	APG	PPG
1946–47	New York	54	.276	.620	2.0	8.1
Career		54	.276	.620	2.0	8.1

== See also ==
- List of select Jewish basketball players
- The First Basket
