= Sidney Hertzberg =

American basketball player (1922–2005)

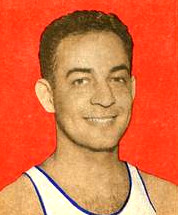
- Hertzberg circa 1948

Personal information
- Born: July 29, 1922 Brooklyn, New York, U.S.
- Died: July 25, 2005 (aged 82) Woodmere, New York, U.S.
- Listed height: 5 ft 10 in (1.78 m)
- Listed weight: 175 lb (79 kg)

Career information
- High school: Tilden (Brooklyn, New York)
- College: CCNY
- Playing career: 1946–1951
- Position: Guard
- Number: 8, 14, 29, 4

Career history
- 1946–1947: New York Knicks
- 1947–1949: Washington Capitols
- 1949–1951: Boston Celtics
- 1951–1952: Washington Capitols
- Stats at NBA.com
- Stats at Basketball Reference

Sidney "Sonny" Hertzberg (July 29, 1922 – July 25, 2005) was an American professional basketball player.

== Early life ==
Hertzberg was born in Brooklyn, New York, grew up in Crown Heights, and was Jewish. Hertzberg played at Samuel J. Tilden High School and City College of New York, where he was a teammate of longtime Knicks coach Red Holzman.

== Professional career ==
Hertzberg began his professional career in 1946, signing with his home team New York Knicks. He played with the team in the inaugural Basketball Association of America season in 1946–47. He played five games with the team in the 1947–48 before being released. Hertzberg signed with the Washington Capitols, and played for two seasons with the team under future Hall of Fame coach Red Auerbach. On September 28, 1949, Hertzberg was traded to the Boston Celtics for Chick Halbert. Hertzberg was reunited with former Washington coach Auerbach in his second season with Boston in 1950–51. Auerbach and rookie point guard Bob Cousy referred to Hertzberg as "the second coach on the floor", and he was respected for his playmaking and court savviness.

After playing five seasons of professional basketball, Hertzberg served as a scout and broadcasting commentator for the Knicks.

He is a member of the New York City Basketball Hall of Fame, the Old-Timers Basketball Hall of Fame, the City College Hall of Fame, and the National Jewish Sports Hall of Fame.

== Later life and death ==
Hertzberg went on to become a managing director of Bear Stearns, an investment banking and brokerage firm.

Hertzberg died of heart failure on July 25, 2005, at his home in Woodmere, New York.

== BAA/NBA career statistics ==
Legend
GP	Games played	FG%	Field-goal percentage
FT%	Free-throw percentage	RPG	Rebounds per game
APG	Assists per game	PPG	Points per game
**Bold**	Career high

=== Regular season ===
Year	Team	GP	FG%	FT%	RPG	APG	PPG
1946–47	New York	59	.289	.758	–	.6	8.7
1947–48	New York	4	.071	.750	–	.3	1.3
1947–48	Washington	37	.273	.797	–	.6	7.4
1948–49	Washington	60	.285	.817	–	1.9	7.4
1949–50	Boston	**68**	**.318**	.749	–	2.9	**10.2**
1950–51	Boston	65	.316	**.826**	**4.0**	**3.8**	9.8
Career		293	.299	.792	4.0	2.1	8.7

=== Playoffs ===
Year	Team	GP	FG%	FT%	RPG	APG	PPG
1947	New York	5	.217	.750	–	1.0	7.2
1949	Washington	**11**	**.348**	**.851**	–	**2.5**	**10.7**
1951	Boston	2	.231	.800	**1.0**	1.5	5.0
Career		18	.294	.833	1.0	1.9	9.1

== See also ==
- List of select Jewish basketball players
