= Joe Lapchick =

American basketball player and coach

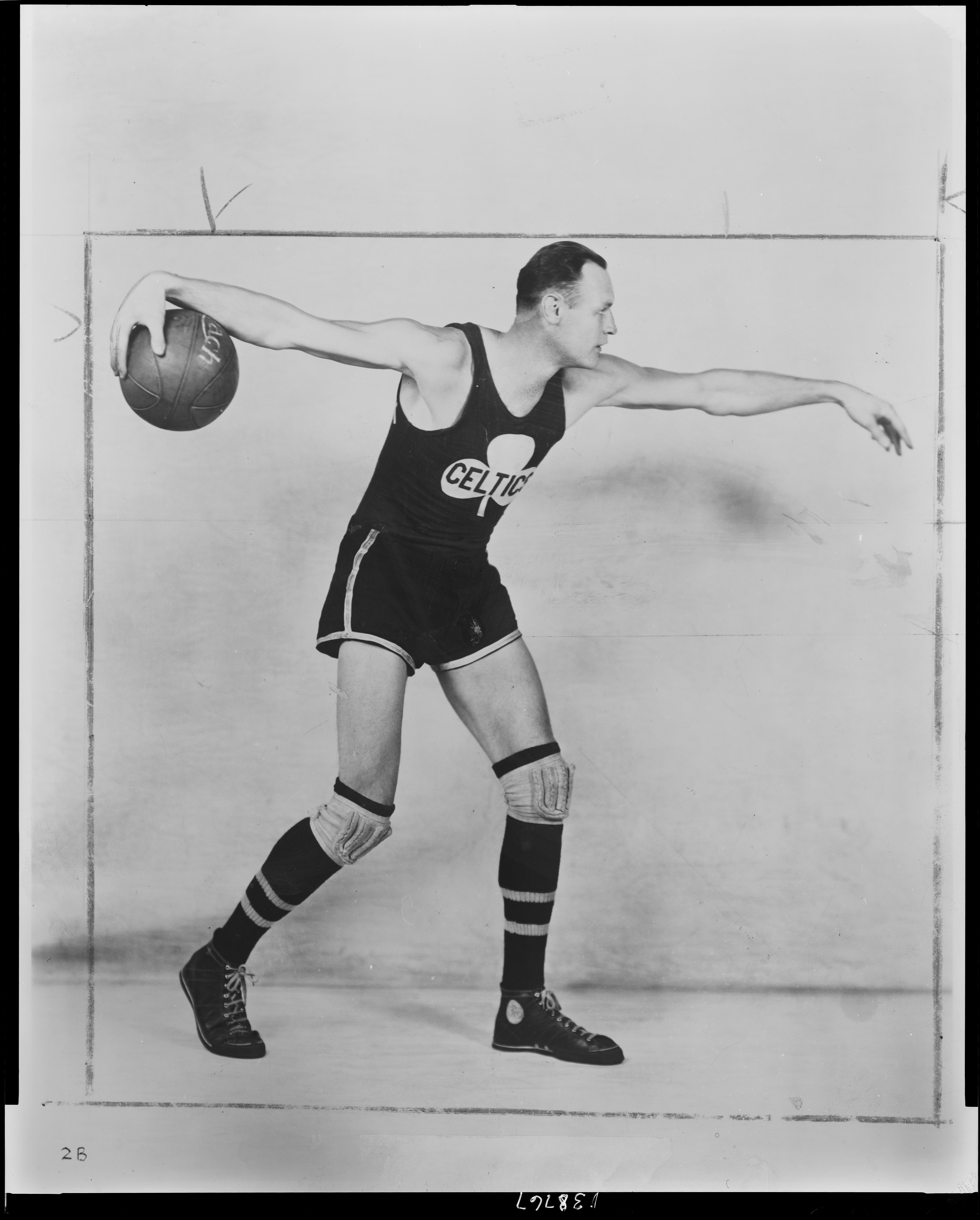
- Lapchick in his first Celtic uniform

Biographical details
- Born: April 12, 1900; Yonkers, New York, U.S.
- Died: August 10, 1970 (aged 70); Monticello, New York, U.S.

Playing career
- 1923–1928: Original Celtics
- 1928–1930: Cleveland Rosenblums
- 1930–1931: Toledo Red Man Tobaccos

Coaching career (HC unless noted)
- 1936–1947: St. John's
- 1947–1956: New York Knicks
- 1956–1965: St. John's

Head coaching record
- Overall: 334–130 (college); 326–247 (NBA)

Accomplishments and honors

Championships
- As player: 4× ABL champion (1927–1930); All-Time Pro Stars Second Team (1945); As head coach: 3× NBA All-Star Game head coach (1951, 1953, 1954); 4× NIT champion (1943, 1944, 1959, 1965); 6× Metropolitan New York Conference regular season championships (1943, 1946, 1947, 1958, 1961, 1962)
- Basketball Hall of Fame; Inducted in 1966

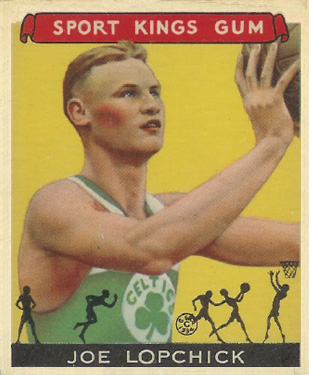
Joe Lapchick's misspelled 1933 Goudey Sport Kings basketball card.

Joseph Bohomiel Lapchick (April 12, 1900 – August 10, 1970) was an American professional basketball player, mostly known for playing with the Original Celtics in the 1920s and 1930s. He is commonly regarded as the best center of his era, overshadowed (if anything) in his later years only by Tarzan Cooper. After ending his playing career in 1937, Lapchick became head coach at St. John's University, a position he held until 1947, when he took over the New York Knicks in the NBA. Lapchick coached the Knicks until 1957, leading them to three consecutive NBA Finals appearances (1951–1953). He returned to St. John's, coaching them until 1965.

== Early life ==
Born in Yonkers, New York to Czech immigrants, Lapchick as a boy helped his struggling family make ends meet by scrounging for coal near railroad tracks. At age 12 the youngster started playing basketball around his neighborhood, wearing a uniform his mother had made for him. Like many youngsters of the era, he stopped going to school after the eighth grade.

== Playing career ==
While working as a caddie and in a factory, the 15-year-old found he could make $5 to $10 per night playing for local basketball teams. At age 19 he was suiting up for four different touring teams, such as the Holyoke Reds, Brooklyn Visitations, and Troy Trojans, and pocketing up to $100 per game. Basketball became his life for the next 50 years.

Lapchick was rangy at 6-foot-5, making him a valuable commodity at a time when a jump ball was held after every basket. "I played one manager against the other," he said years later. "I bargained with the managers for every game. When there was a clash of dates, I took the best offer."

In 1923 he joined the fabled Original Celtics (a team that was the second incarnation of the New York Celtics, which had disbanded during World War I). At first the team eschewed league play, choosing instead to barnstorm throughout the Northeast and wow crowds with its razzle-dazzle style of play. Conditions were spartan. When a large cut on Lapchick's wrist became infected with uniform dye, a teammate rubbed off the scab with a towel and doused the wound with whiskey. Luckily for Lapchick, the treatment worked.

The Celtics joined the American Basketball League in 1926 and won two straight titles. So dominant were Lapchick, Nat Holman, and the rest of the Celtics that the league insisted the team disband. The team disbanded in 1928. Lapchick and two other former Celtics then joined the Cleveland Rosenblums, a team owned by a department store magnate who had named the team after himself. With Lapchick starring at the pivot, the "Rosenblum Celtics" won two straight ABL titles. The Rosenblums folded during the 1930–31 season and Lapchick and four of his teammates signed with the Toledo Red Man Tobaccos.

The Great Depression forced an end to the ABL in 1931. Still a young man, Lapchick re-formed the Celtics with Dutch Dehnert, Davey Banks, Nat Hickey, Johnny Beckman, Carl Husta and him. They hit the road for five years, with Lapchick handling driving duties, and Kate Smith singing "God Bless America" at games.

== Coaching career ==
In 1936 Lapchick landed the coaching job at St. John's University, New York City. In 11 seasons he steered the Redmen to a 180–55 record and two consecutive National Invitation Tournament titles, in 1943 and 1944. Overwhelmed by stress, Lapchick fainted during the second half of the 1944 final game. In 1947 he passed up a then-astronomical offer of $12,000 per year to stay at St. John's, opting instead to accept a job as coach of the New York Knickerbockers of the fledgling Basketball Association of America. Landing Lapchick was a big boost to the league, which was in only its second year of operation. He signed Nathaniel "Sweetwater" Clifton to the Knicks, one of the league's first African-American players.

Though a slick player and an admired coach, Lapchick was perhaps best known for his obsessive worrying and anxiety during games. He lived every second of every game as though it were the last tick of the clock. Stress related health problems ended his professional coaching career and caused an occasional on-court fainting spell and even a few heart attacks. Lapchick was respected for his motivational coaching style, which focused less on mechanics than on eliciting peak performances from his players. Stressing a freewheeling offensive approach and smooth ballhandling, Lapchick built winners at both the college and pro levels. As a player, Lapchick had sharp passing and shooting skills that made him one of the first great pro centers and that helped his teams win several championships.

Continuing to emphasize his themes of personal achievement and responsibility, Lapchick was hired by the New York Knicks for the 1947-48 season, the second in team history. He finished 2nd place in his first year and lost in the first round. The Knicks finished 2nd in the next two seasons, which saw them lose in the Division Finals each time before having it all come together in the 1950–51 season. They finished 36-30 for a third place in the Eastern Division, but they beat Syracuse in a best-of-five series that went the distance to reach their first NBA Finals. They met the Rochester Royals, also making their first NBA Finals. The Knicks lost the first three games of the series, which had scores of 92–65, 99–84, and 78–71. The Knicks suddenly pulled off three straight close wins to even the series at three going into Game 7 in Rochester. They trailed by six at halftime but managed to reel in a late 74–72 lead in the final minutes of the fourth quarter. Rochester utilized a handful of free throws and jump balls (at the time, jump balls were done after a made free throw in the last three minutes of a game) to prevail 79–75. The Knicks improved by one win the following year but repeated a trip to the Finals with wins over Boston and Syracuse. The Knicks met the Minneapolis Lakers, who had won two league championships in the past three seasons under coach John Kundla and player such as George Mikan. The two teams split the first four games, which included wins for each team in overtime. Minneapolis won 102–89 to have the Knicks on the wall for Game 6, but they won 76–68 to force Game 7 on the road. In Game 7, the Lakers led by six after one quarter and never looked back in an 82–65 victory. The following year, the Knicks went 47–23 for their first ever division title (sixteen years later, the Knicks would set a new mark for wins). They then beat Baltimore and Boston to reach the Finals for the third straight year. The Knicks met the Lakers again and actually pulled off a 96–88 win on the road for Game 1. However, the Lakers would win the next four games, two of which came by two points to win the series in five games. Under Lapchick, the Knicks were the first NBA team to reach the Finals in three consecutive seasons. Coincidentally, the next team to reach the Finals three straight times and lose three in a row would be the Lakers, who reached the Finals in 1954 to set a three-peat before later losing three in a row from 1968 to 1970. The Knicks won the division again the following year but lost in the one-time Round-robin tournament used for the playoffs that saw the Knicks lose four games combined to Boston and Syracuse with no wins. Lapchick's final full season came in 1954, where they went 38-34 and lost in the Division Semifinals to Boston. He did not finish out the 1955 season, which saw him leave after going 26–25 to be replaced by Vince Boryla for the final 21 games.

Ultimately, Lapchick led the Knicks to eight straight winning seasons and eight trips to the playoffs, including three straight NBA Finals from 1951 to 1953. The 1953–54 Knicks were more than just a team of talented players; eight of them went on to coach pro or college teams, a tribute to Lapchick's leadership. Though a great motivator, Lapchick was a wild man on the sidelines, stomping on his coat, smashing chairs, and tossing various objects into the air. Stress-related health problems forced him to quit near the end of the 1955–56 season. He left the Knicks with a 326–247 NBA coaching record.

Lapchick rested for only a month before returning to St. John's, where in nine more seasons he led the Redmen to two more NIT crowns, giving them a record four titles. Lapchick wasn't just his players' basketball coach; he monitored their academic performance as well. The school's mandatory-retirement rules forced Lapchick, a two-time college Coach of the Year, to step down after the 1964–65 season at age 65. He had several heart attacks that year. The season ended with the Redmen upsetting Villanova, 55–51, in an emotional NIT Championship Game.

Describing his final season at St. John's, Lapchick told the Washington, D.C.–based Evening Star: "I used to double up with chest pains. Sometimes I couldn't even talk to the team during halftime."

== Later years and legacy ==
Lapchick turned to writing. In 1968 he wrote 50 Years of Basketball, a book that was both a compilation of stories from Lapchick's early days as a player and an explanation of his coaching philosophy. As one of basketball's most prominent elder statesmen, Lapchick also stayed active as a spokesman for the sport.

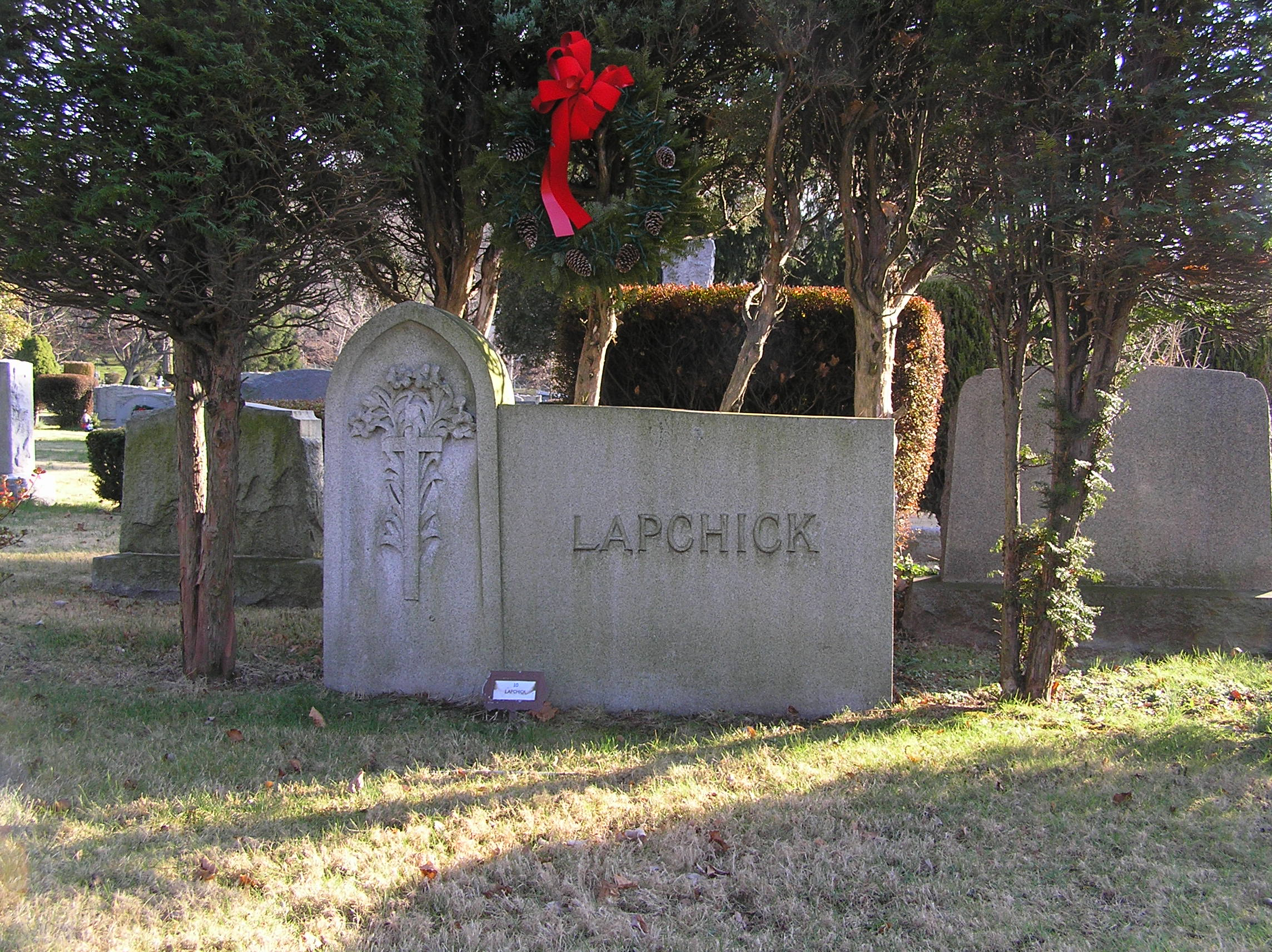
The grave of Joe Lapchick in Oakland Cemetery in Yonkers, NY

He died of a heart attack in Monticello, New York, in 1970 at age 70. As a star center with the Original Celtics and other barnstorming teams, a college coach at St. John's, an NBA coach with the New York Knicks, and an ambassador of the sport, Lapchick's legacy was significant across the game and its history. From player to coach to author and dignitary, Lapchick played a variety of roles in his more than 50 years in the game of basketball. He was an influential figure who helped nurture the sport from its beginnings into its modern form.

== Legacy and honors ==
- Lapchick was elected to the Naismith Memorial Basketball Hall of Fame as a member of the Original Celtics in 1959 and as an individual in 1966.
- In his memory, St. John's created an annual preseason college basketball tournament entitled the Lapchick Memorial Tournament.
- Jeremy Piven portrayed him in the 2023 movie Sweetwater.

=== Family ===
Lapchick married Elizabeth Sarubbi in 1931; they had one daughter and had two sons. Barbara Lapchick was one of the original Ford models and graduated from Barnard College. Dr. Richard Lapchick is a human rights activist working for racial equality, an internationally recognized expert on sports issues, a scholar and an author. Lapchick is the Endowed Chair and Director of the DeVos Sport Business Management Program at the College of Business Administration, University of Central Florida. He is also President/CEO of the National Consortium for Academics and Sport (NCAS), a school outreach program which focuses on teaching youth how to improve race relations, and develop conflict resolution skills. Joseph Lapchick graduated from the USMA and took a commission in the USAF. He earned a PhD at Harvard. He was superintendent of schools in Aspen, Colorado, and later an area superintendent in Philadelphia.

== Head coaching record ==
=== NBA ===
Legend
Regular season	G	Games coached	W	Games won	L	Games lost	W–L %	Win–loss %
Playoffs	PG	Playoff games	PW	Playoff wins	PL	Playoff losses	PW–L %	Playoff win–loss %

Team	Year	G	W	L	W–L%	Finish	PG	PW	PL	PW–L%	Result
New York	1947–48	48	26	22	.542	2nd in Eastern	3	1	2	.333	Lost in First Round
New York	1948–49	60	32	28	.533	2nd in Eastern	6	3	3	.500	Lost in Division Finals
New York	1949–50	68	40	28	.588	2nd in Eastern	5	3	2	.600	Lost in Division Finals
New York	1950–51	66	36	30	.545	3rd in Eastern	14	8	6	.571	Lost in NBA Finals
New York	1951–52	66	37	29	.561	3rd in Eastern	14	8	6	.571	Lost in NBA Finals
New York	1952–53	70	47	23	.671	1st in Eastern	11	6	5	.545	Lost in NBA Finals
New York	1953–54	72	44	28	.611	1st in Eastern	4	0	4	.000	Lost in Round-Robin
New York	1954–55	72	38	34	.528	2nd in Eastern	3	1	2	.333	Lost in Division Semifinals
New York	1955–56	51	26	25	.510	4th in Eastern	-	-	-	-	Resigned
Career		573	326	247	.569		60	30	30	.500	
