= Adeane =

Adeane is an English surname. People with this surname include:

- Charles Adeane (1863–1943), British army officer
- Edward Adeane (1939–2015), private secretary to Prince of Wales
- Edward Stanley Adeane (1836–1902), Admiral of the Royal Navy
- Henry John Adeane (1789–1847), English politician
- Henry John Adeane (1833–1870), English politician
- James Whorwood Adeane (1740–1802), British army general and politician
- Jane Henrietta Adeane (1842–1926), British writer and benefactor
- Michael Adeane, Baron Adeane (1910–1984), private secretary to Queen Elizabeth II
- Madeline Adeane (1869–1941), of The Wyndham Sisters portrait

== See also ==
- Adéane, a rural community in Ziguinchor Region, Senegal
