= Riddell baronets of Riddell (1628) =

Escutcheon of the Chief of Clan Riddell, The Riddell of that Ilk, Baronet Riddell of Riddell

The Riddell baronetcy, of Riddell in the County of Roxburgh, was created in the Baronetage of Nova Scotia on 14 May 1628 for John Riddell. His lands were erected into the barony and regality of New Riddell.

In September 1998 the 13th Baronet was recognised by the Lord Lyon as Chief of the name.

== Riddell baronets, of Riddell (1628) ==
- Sir John Riddell, 1st Baronet (died 1632)
- Sir Walter Riddell, 2nd Baronet (died c. 1669)
- Sir John Riddell, 3rd Baronet (died 1700)
- Sir Walter Riddell, 4th Baronet (1664–1747)
- Sir Walter Riddell, 5th Baronet (1695–1765)
- Sir John Riddell, 6th Baronet (1726–1768)
- Sir Walter Buchanan Riddell, 7th Baronet (1763–1784)
- Sir James Buchanan Riddell, 8th Baronet (1765–1784
- Sir John Buchanan Riddell, 9th Baronet (1768–1819), Member of Parliament for Lanark Burghs, married Lady Frances Marsham, daughter of Charles Marsham, 1st Earl of Romney.
- Sir Walter Buchanan Riddell, 10th Baronet (1810–1892)
- Sir James Walter Buchanan Riddell, 11th Baronet (1849–1924)
- Sir Walter Robert Buchanan Riddell, 12th Baronet (1879–1934)
- Sir John Charles Buchanan Riddell, 13th Baronet (1934–2010)
- Sir Walter John Buchanan Riddell, 14th Baronet (born 1974)

The heir apparent is the present holder's only son Finlay John Riddell (born 2001).

== Extended family ==
The 1st Baronet's third son William was knighted by Charles I. He was a soldier of the Dutch Republic during the Thirty Years War and Governor of Doesburg. Archibald Riddell, third son of the 2nd Baronet, was a minister of the Reformed church in Edinburgh and Covenanter.
