= History of the New York Knicks =

The New York Knickerbockers, better known as the New York Knicks, are a professional basketball team based in New York City that competes in the National Basketball Association (NBA). The Knicks play in the Eastern Conference's Atlantic Division. In its 77 seasons, the franchise has reached the NBA Finals nine times and won three championships. As of the end of the 2021–22 season, New York has won more than 2,900 regular season games, and the team had the fourth-highest victory total in NBA history. Since 1968, the Knicks have played home games at Madison Square Garden.

== The beginning: 1946–1967 ==
=== Early years ===
In 1946, basketball, particularly college basketball, was a growing and increasingly profitable sport in New York City. Hockey was another popular sport at the time and generated considerable profits; however, the arenas were not used often. Max Kase, a New York sportswriter, became the sports editor at the Boston American in the 1930s, when he met Boston Garden owner Walter A. Brown. Kase developed the idea of an organized professional league to showcase college players upon their graduation and felt it could become profitable if properly assembled. Brown, intrigued by the opportunity to attain additional income when the hockey teams were not playing or on the road, contacted several arena owners. On June 6, 1946, Kase and Brown and a group of seventeen others assembled at the Commodore Hotel in New York City, as the Basketball Association of America (BAA), where charter franchises were granted to major cities throughout the country.

Ned Irish, a college basketball promoter, retired sportswriter and then president of Madison Square Garden, was in attendance. Kase originally planned to own and operate the New York franchise himself and approached Irish with a proposal to lease the Garden. Irish explained that the rules of the Arena Managers Association of America stated that Madison Square Garden was required to own any professional teams that played in the arena. On the day of the meeting, Kase made his proposal to the panel of owners; however, they were much more impressed by Irish and his vast resources; Kase relented and the franchise was awarded to Irish.

Irish wanted a distinct name for his franchise that was representative of the city of New York. He called together members of his staff for a meeting to cast their votes in a hat. After tallying the votes, the franchise was named the Knickerbockers. The "Knickerbocker" name comes from the pseudonym used by Washington Irving in his book A History of New York, a name which became applied to the descendants of the original Dutch settlers of what later became New York, and later, by extension, to New Yorkers in general. In search of a head coach, Irish approached successful St. John's University coach Joe Lapchick in May 1946. Lapchick readily accepted after Irish promised to make him the highest paid coach in the league; however, he requested he remain at St. John's one more season in hopes of winning one last championship. Irish obliged, hiring former Manhattan College coach Neil Cohalan as interim coach for the first year.

With no college draft in the league's initial year, there was no guarantee that the Knicks or the league itself would thrive. Consequently, teams focused on signing college players from their respective cities as a way to promote the professional league. The Knicks held their first training camp in the Catskill Mountains at the Nevele Country Club. Twenty-five players were invited to attend the three-week session. Players worked out twice a day and the chemistry between the New York natives was instant. With a roster assembled, the Knicks faced the Toronto Huskies at Toronto's Maple Leaf Gardens on November 1, 1946, in what would be the franchise's first game—as well as the first in league history. In a low-scoring affair presented in front of 7,090 spectators, the Knicks defeated the Huskies 68–66 with Leo Gottlieb leading the Knicks in scoring with 14 points. With Madison Square Garden's crowded schedule, the Knicks were forced to play many of their home games at the 69th Regiment Armory during the team's early years. The Knicks went on to finish their inaugural campaign with a 33–27 record and achieved a playoff berth under Cohalan despite a dismal shooting percentage of 28 percent. The Knicks faced the Cleveland Rebels in the quarterfinals, winning the series 2–1. However, the Knicks were swept by the Philadelphia Warriors in two games in the semifinals.

As promised, Lapchick took over in 1947, bringing with him his up-tempo coaching style which emphasized fast ball movement. Six new players were signed, including guard Carl Braun and Japanese American guard Wataru Misaka, the first non-Caucasian professional basketball player. Under Lapchick, the Knicks made nine straight playoff appearances beginning in 1947. Braun, who averaged 14.3 points, emerged as the team's star and paired with Dick Holub and Bud Palmer to account for half of the team's offense. Despite this, the Knicks struggled throughout the year, compiling a 26–22 record. Their finish was good enough to place them second in the Eastern Division and secure a playoff match-up against the Baltimore Bullets where they lost the series two games to one. In the 1948 NBA draft, the Knicks selected two future Hall of Fame players in center Dolph Schayes and Harry Gallatin. The Knicks were leery of Schayes' talent, prompting the center to leave to play for the Syracuse Nationals of the struggling National Basketball League. Despite losing Schayes, the team started the year well going 17–8 before they fell into a slump. They ended the year with a seven-game win streak to finish with a 32–28 record and a third-straight playoff appearance. The Knicks defeated the Bullets in a rematch of their previous encounter in 1947, winning the series 2–1. The team however struggled against the Washington Capitols and lost the series 1–2.

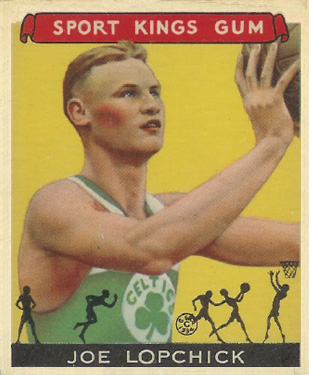
Lapchick was responsible for leading the Knicks during their early success. However, these ventures never culminated with a win in the NBA Finals.

Prior to the beginning of the 1949–50 season, the BAA merged with the National Basketball League to form the National Basketball Association with the BAA absorbing six teams from its former competitor. Despite division realignments, the Knicks remained in the Eastern Division. The team continued its dominance under Lapchick, winning 40 games; however they lost the Eastern Division finals to the Syracuse Nationals.

The following season, the Knicks made history signing Sweetwater Clifton to a contract, thus becoming the first professional basketball team to sign an African American player. During this same season, the Knicks finished with a 36–30 record. Though they placed third in their division, they secured a playoff spot and began the first of three consecutive trips to the NBA Finals. In spite of their success, the Knicks could not overcome the Rochester Royals despite a valiant comeback after losing the first three games of the Finals. The next two years, in 1952 and 1953, New York fell to the Minneapolis Lakers in the Finals.

It was during this early period, the Knicks developed their first standout players in Carl Braun who retired as the Knicks leading scorer with 10,449 points before later being surpassed by the likes of Patrick Ewing, Walt Frazier and Willis Reed. Harry Gallatin and Dick McGuire were also well-known standouts on the team and were later enshrined in the Naismith Memorial Basketball Hall of Fame.

Following these back-to-back losses, the Knicks made the playoffs in the subsequent two years with no success. Lapchick resigned as the team's head coach in January 1956 citing health-related issues. Vince Boryla made his debut in February 1956 as the Knicks' new coach in a win over the St. Louis Hawks. However, after two seasons of poor performances and no playoff appearances, Boryla tendered his resignation from the team in April 1958.

=== Levane, Braun, and Donovan ===
Looking to regain their former dominance, Andrew Levane was named the head coach and in his first year, the results were significantly better as the team finished with a 40–32 record, securing their playoff spot. However, the Knicks could not manage to get past the Eastern Division semi-finals. The Levane-led squad fared poorly to begin the 1959–60 season and under mounting pressure Levane resigned and was immediately replaced by Carl Braun, who became the team's first player-coach. The team did not fare much better under Braun and the Knicks hired Eddie Donovan, who helped build up St. Bonaventure's basketball team, in 1961. During Donovan's tenure, New York failed to achieve a playoff berth. As a testament to their struggles, on March 2, 1962, the Knicks faced the Philadelphia Warriors in Hershey, Pennsylvania, where they infamously allowed Wilt Chamberlain to score an NBA-record 100 points in a 169–147 Warriors victory.

In 1964, the franchise's fortunes began to take a steady turn. The Knicks drafted center Willis Reed, who made an immediate impact on the court and was named NBA Rookie of the Year for his efforts. However, the leaders of the team still remained in flux. In an attempt to reorganize, the Knicks named former standout Harry Gallatin as head coach while reassigning Donovan to general manager position. After a slow start in 1965, Dick McGuire, another former Knick, replaced his former teammate Gallatin midway through the season. Though he failed to guide the Knicks to the playoffs in 1965, he managed to do so the following season, however the Knicks lost in the Eastern Division semi-finals. McGuire was abruptly replaced midway through the 1967–68 season after the team began the season with a 15–22 record.

== Championship years: 1967–1975 ==
=== A new era ===
With the Knicks under .500, the team decided to hire Red Holzman, whose impact was immediate. Under his direction, the Knicks went 28–17 and finished with a 43–39 record thus salvaging a playoff berth, however the Knicks were again vanquished in the Eastern Division semi-finals by the Philadelphia 76ers. However their roster was slowly coming together piece by piece. Rookies Phil Jackson and Walt Frazier were named to the NBA All-Rookie Team while Dick Barnett and Willis Reed performed in the 1968 NBA All-Star Game.

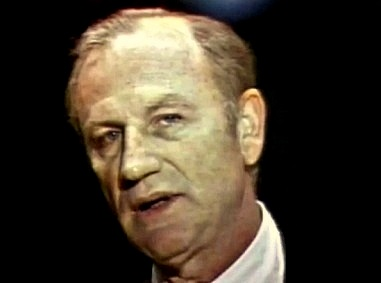
William 'Red' Holzman guided the Knicks to two championships during his tenure.

The following season, the team acquired Dave DeBusschere from the Detroit Pistons, and the team went 54–28. In the playoffs, New York made it past the first round of contention for the first time since 1953, sweeping the Baltimore Bullets in four games, before falling to the Boston Celtics in the Eastern Division finals.

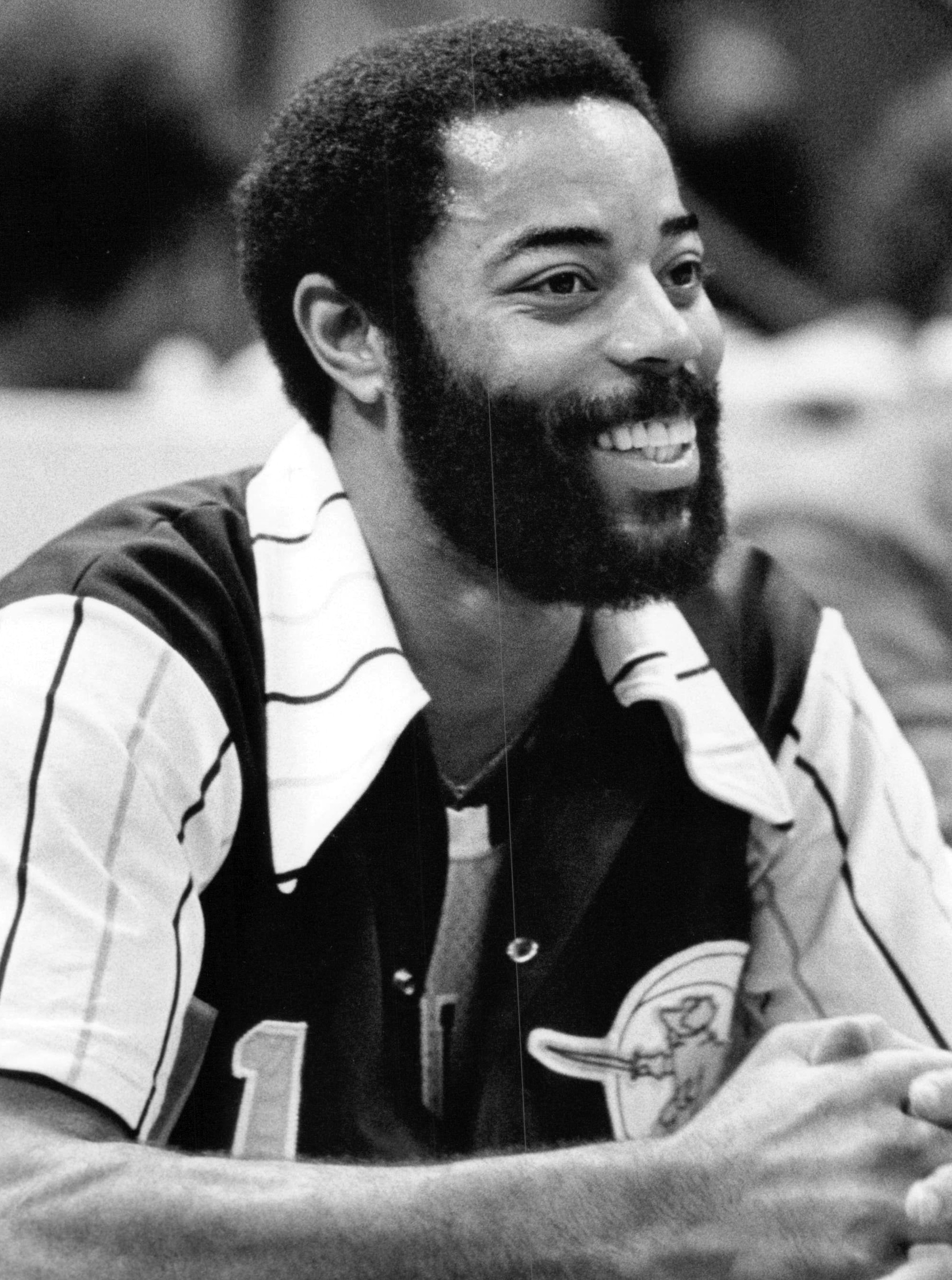
Walt 'Clyde' Frazier

In the 1969–70 season, the Knicks had a then-single-season NBA record 18 straight victories en route to a 60–22 record, which was the best regular season record in the franchise's history to that point. After defeating the Bullets in the Eastern Division semifinals and the Milwaukee Bucks in the Eastern Division finals, the Knicks faced the Los Angeles Lakers in the NBA Finals. With the series tied at 2–2, the Knicks would be tested in Game 5. Willis Reed tore a muscle in his right leg in the second quarter, and was lost for the rest of the game. Despite his absence, New York went on to win the game, rallying from a 16-point deficit.

Without their injured captain the Knicks lost Game 6, setting up one of the most famous moments in NBA history. Reed limped onto the court before the seventh game, determined to play through the pain of his injury. He scored New York's first two baskets before going scoreless for the remainder of the contest. Although he was not at full strength, Reed's heroics inspired the Knicks, and they won the game by a score of 113–99, allowing New York to capture the title that had eluded them for so long. Reed, who had been named the All-Star MVP and the league's MVP that season, was named MVP of the Finals, becoming the first player to attain all three awards in a single season.

=== Earl Monroe arrives ===
The Knicks' success continued for the next few years. After losing to the Bullets in the 1971 Eastern Conference finals, the team, aided by the acquisitions of Jerry Lucas and Earl "The Pearl" Monroe, returned to the Finals in 1972. This time the Knicks fell to the Lakers in five games. The next year, the results were reversed, as the Knicks defeated the Lakers in five games to win their second NBA title in four years. The team had one more impressive season in 1973–74, as they reached the Eastern Conference finals, where they fell in five games to the Celtics. It was after this season that Willis Reed announced his retirement, and the team's fortunes began to shift once more.

== Post-Championship years: 1975–1985 ==
=== 1974–1981: Struggles ===
In the 1974–75 season, the Knicks posted a 40–42 record, their first losing record in eight seasons. However, the team still qualified for a playoff spot, however the opportunity was squandered as they lost to the Houston Rockets in the first round. After two more seasons with losing records, Holzman was replaced by Willis Reed who signed a three-year contract. On August 20, 1977, Gulf and Western Industries, which owned 81% of Madison Square Garden's stock, purchased complete control of the corporation and turned it into a whole owned subsidiary. In Reed's first year, New York finished the year with a 43–39 record and returned to the Eastern Conference semi-finals, where they were swept by the Philadelphia 76ers. The next season, after the team began with a 6–8 record, Holzman was rehired as the team's coach after Reed had angered Madison Square Garden president Sonny Werblin. The team did not fare any better under Holzman's direction, finishing with a 31–51 record, their worst in thirteen years.

After improving to a 39–43 record in the 1979–80 season, the Knicks posted a 50–32 record in the 1980–81 season. In the playoffs, the Chicago Bulls swept New York in two games. Holzman retired the following season as one of the winningest coaches in NBA history. The team's record that year was a dismal 33–49. However, Holzman's legacy would continue through the players he influenced. One of the Knicks' bench players and defensive specialists during the 1970s was Phil Jackson. Jackson went on to coach the Chicago Bulls and Los Angeles Lakers to eleven NBA championships, surpassing Red Auerbach for the most in NBA history. Jackson cited Holzman as a significant influence on his career in the NBA.

=== 1982–1984: Bernard King ===
Hubie Brown replaced Holzman as head coach and in his first season, the team went 44–38 and make it to the second round of the playoffs, where they were swept by the eventual champion Philadelphia 76ers. The next season, the team, aided by new acquisition Bernard King, improved to 47–35 and returned to the playoffs. The team defeated the Detroit Pistons in the first round with an overtime win in the fifth and deciding game, before losing in second round in seven games to the Celtics. The team's struggles continued the next season as they lost their last twelve games to finish with a 24–58 record. The first of these losses occurred on March 23, 1985, where King injured his knee and spent the next 24 months in rehabilitation.

== The Patrick Ewing Era: 1985–2000 ==
=== 1985–1990: The early Ewing years ===
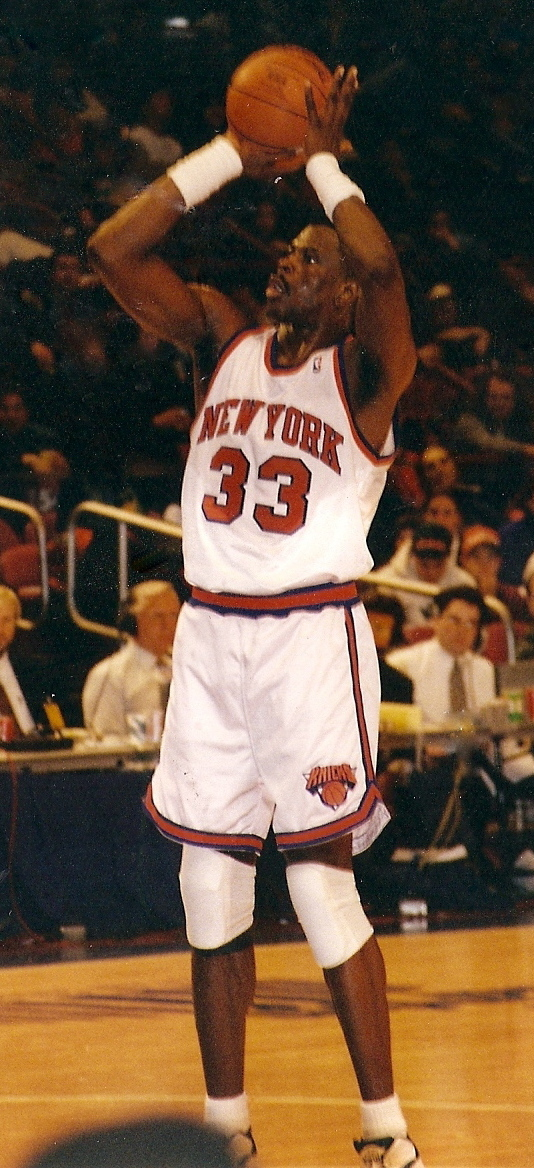
Patrick Ewing led the Knicks to the Finals in 1994 and 1999.

As a result of the Knicks' dismal performance in the 1984–85 season, the team was entered into the first-ever NBA draft lottery. The team ended up winning the number one pick in that year's NBA draft. They used the pick to select star center Patrick Ewing of Georgetown University. In Ewing's first season with the Knicks, he led all rookies in scoring (20 points per game) and rebounds (9 rebounds per game), and he won the NBA Rookie of the Year Award. The team would not fare as well, though, as they struggled to a 23–59 record in his first season.

During Ewing's second season, the team started with a 4–12 record and head coach Hubie Brown was dismissed in favor of assistant Bob Hill. Under Hill, the Knicks had brief successes but went on to lose seventeen of their twenty-one final games of the season to finish 20–46 under Hill and 24–58 on the season. Hill was dismissed at season's end.

The team immediately turned around in the 1987–88 season with the hiring of Rick Pitino as head coach, who, only months prior to his hiring, led Providence College to the Final Four, turning around a program that had struggled prior to his arrival. Combined with the selection of point guard Mark Jackson, who won the NBA Rookie of the Year Award and garnered MVP consideration, in the draft and with Ewing's consistently stellar play, the Knicks made the playoffs with a record of 38–44, where they were defeated by the Celtics in the first round.

The resurgence continued the following season as the team traded backup center Bill Cartwright to the Bulls for power forward Charles Oakley before the season started and then posted a 52–30 record, which was good enough for their first division title in eighteen years and their fifth division title in franchise history. In the playoffs, they defeated the 76ers in the first round before losing to the Chicago Bulls in the Eastern Conference semi-finals.

Prior to the start of the 1989–1990 season, Pitino departed from New York to coach for the University of Kentucky leaving many stunned by his departure. Assistant Stu Jackson was named as Pitino's replacement becoming the team's fourteenth head coach and the youngest head coach in the NBA, at the time, at the age of thirty-two. Under Jackson's direction, the Knicks went 45–37 and defeated the Celtics in the first round of the playoffs, winning the final three games after losing the first two. They went on to lose to the eventual NBA champion Detroit Pistons in the next round. Jackson and the Knicks struggled to a 7–8 record to begin the 1990–91 season and Jackson was replaced by John MacLeod who led the Knicks to a 32–35 record, ending the season with a 39–43 record overall that was good enough to earn the team another playoff appearance. The Knicks were swept in the first round by the eventual NBA champion, Chicago Bulls.

=== 1991–1996: Pat Riley, Don Nelson, and the 1994 NBA Finals ===
After the conclusion of the season, MacLeod left the team to become the head coach at the University of Notre Dame. President David Checketts reached out to Pat Riley, who was working as a commentator for the National Broadcasting Company (NBC), to see if he was interested in returning to coaching. Riley accepted the Knicks proposition on May 31, 1991. Riley, who coached the Lakers to four NBA titles during the 1980s, implemented a rough and physical style emphasizing defense. Under Riley, the team, led by Ewing and guard John Starks, who scored 24 points per game and 13.9 points per game respectively, improved to a 51–31 record, tying them for first place in the Atlantic Division. After defeating the Pistons in the first round of the playoffs, the team faced the Bulls, losing the series 4–3 in seven games. The 1992–93 season proved to be even more successful, as the Knicks won the Atlantic Division with a 60–22 record. Before the season, the Knicks traded Mark Jackson to the Los Angeles Clippers for Charles Smith, Doc Rivers, and Bo Kimble while also acquiring Rolando Blackman from the Dallas Mavericks. The team made it to the Eastern Conference finals, where once again they met the Bulls. After taking a two games-to-none lead, the Knicks lost the next four games.

After the Bulls' Michael Jordan made what would be his first retirement from basketball prior to the 1993–94 season, many saw this as an opportunity for the Knicks to finally make it to the NBA Finals. The team, who acquired Derek Harper in a midseason trade with the Dallas Mavericks, once again won the Atlantic Division with a 57–25 record. In the playoffs, the team played a then NBA-record 25 games (the Boston Celtics played 26 games in the 2008 playoffs); they started by defeating the New Jersey Nets in the first round before finally getting past the Bulls, defeating them in the second round in seven games. In the Eastern Conference Finals, they faced the Indiana Pacers, who at one point held a three games-to-two lead. They had this advantage thanks to the exploits of Reggie Miller, who scored 25 fourth quarter points in Game 5 to lead the Pacers to victory. However, the Knicks won the next two games to reach their first NBA Finals since 1973.

In the finals, the Knicks would play seven low-scoring, defensive games against the Houston Rockets. After splitting the first two games in Houston, the Knicks would win two out of three games at Madison Square Garden, which also hosted the New York Rangers first Stanley Cup celebration in 54 years following their win over the Vancouver Canucks in game seven of their finals during the series. (A Knicks win would have made the Garden the first building to host a Cup winner and an NBA champ in the same season.) In Game 6, however, a last-second attempt at a game-winning shot by Starks was tipped by Rockets center Hakeem Olajuwon, giving the Rockets an 86–84 victory and forcing a Game 7. The Knicks lost Game 7 90–84, credited in large part to Starks's dismal 2-for-18 shooting performance and Riley's stubborn refusal to bench Starks, despite having bench players who were renowned for their shooting prowess, such as Rolando Blackman and Hubert Davis available. The loss denied New York the distinction of having both NBA and NHL championships in the same year. Nevertheless, the Knicks had gotten some inspiration from Mark Messier and the Rangers during the finals.

On August 28, 1994, Viacom purchased majority ownership of Paramount Communications, but quickly sold MSG to Cablevision and ITT Corporation. The Knicks were second place in the Atlantic Division with a 55–27 record. The team defeated the Cleveland Cavaliers before facing the Pacers again in the second round. The tone for the Knicks–Pacers series was set in Game 1, as Miller once again became a clutch nuisance to the Knicks by scoring eight points in the final 8 seconds of the game to give the Pacers a 107–105 victory. The series went to a Game 7, and when Patrick Ewing's last-second finger roll attempt to tie the game missed, the Pacers clinched the 97–95 win. Riley resigned the next day, and the Knicks hired Don Nelson as their new head coach.

However Nelson's uptempo approach clashed with the Knicks' defensive identity, and during the 1995–96 season, Nelson was fired after 59 games, and, instead of going after another well-known coach, the Knicks hired longtime assistant Jeff Van Gundy, who had no prior experience as a head coach. The Knicks ended up with a 47–35 record that year, and swept the Cavaliers in the first round of the playoffs before losing to the eventual champion Bulls (who had an NBA record 72 wins in the regular season) in five games.

In the 1996–97 season, the Knicks, with the additions of such players as Larry Johnson and Allan Houston, registered a 57–25 record. In the playoffs, the Knicks swept the Charlotte Hornets in the first round before facing the Miami Heat (coached by Riley) in the second round. The Knicks took a 3–1 lead in the series before a brawl near the end of Game 5 resulted in suspensions of key players. Many of the suspended Knicks players, Ewing in particular, were disciplined not for participating in the altercation itself, but for violating an NBA rule stipulating that a benched player may not leave the bench during a fight (the rule was subsequently amended, making it illegal to leave the "bench area"). With Ewing and Houston suspended for Game 6, Johnson and Starks suspended for Game 7, and Charlie Ward suspended for both, the Knicks lost the series.

=== 1997–2000: New ownership and 1999 Finals trip ===
On March 7, 1997, ITT sold its half to Cablevision for $650 million. The 1997–98 season was marred by a wrist injury to Ewing on December 22, which forced him to miss the rest of the season and much of the playoffs. The team, which had a 43–39 record that season, still managed to defeat the Heat in the first round of the playoffs before having another meeting with the Pacers in the second round. Ewing returned in time for game two of the series. This time, the Pacers easily won the series in five games, as Reggie Miller once again broke the hearts of Knicks fans by hitting a tying three-pointer with 5.1 seconds remaining in Game 4, en route to a Pacers overtime victory. For the fourth straight year, the Knicks were eliminated in the second round of the playoffs.

Prior to the lockout-shortened 1998–99 season, the Knicks traded Starks in a package to the Golden State Warriors for 1994's 1st team all league shooting guard Latrell Sprewell (whose contract was voided by the Warriors after choking Warriors' head coach P. J. Carlesimo during the previous season), while also trading Charles Oakley for Marcus Camby. After barely getting into the playoffs with a 27–23 record, the Knicks started a Cinderella run. It started with the Knicks eliminating the #1 seeded Heat in the first round after Allan Houston bounced in a running one-hander off the front of the rim, high off the backboard, and in with 0.8 seconds left in the deciding 5th game. This remarkable upset marked only the second time in NBA history that an 8-seed had defeated the 1-seed in the NBA playoffs, and also the first time it happened in the Eastern Conference. After defeating the Atlanta Hawks in the second round four games to none, they faced the Pacers yet again in the Eastern Conference Finals. Despite losing Ewing to injury for the rest of the playoffs prior to Game 3, the Knicks won the series (aided in part to a four-point play by Larry Johnson in the final seconds of Game 3) to become the first eighth-seeded playoff team to make it to the NBA Finals. However, in the Finals, the San Antonio Spurs, with superstars David Robinson and Tim Duncan, proved too much for the injury-laden Knicks, who lost in five games. The remarkable fifth game of this Finals is remembered for its 2nd half scoring duel between the Spurs' Tim Duncan and the Knicks' Latrell Sprewell, and was decided by a long jumper by Avery Johnson with 47 seconds left to clinch the title for the Spurs.

The 1999–2000 season would prove to be the last one in New York for Ewing, as the Knicks, who had a 50–32 record that season, defeated Miami in another dramatic 7-game series in which Ewing's dunk with over a minute remaining in game 7, provided the winning margin in a 1-point road victory. They would however lose in the Eastern Conference Finals to the Indiana Pacers in six games. After the season, Ewing was traded on September 20, 2000, to the Seattle SuperSonics, and the Ewing era, which produced many successful playoff appearances but no NBA championship titles, came to an end.

== The Jim Dolan Era: 2000–present ==
=== 2000–2002: Scott Layden, Antonio McDyess, and Van Gundy resignation ===
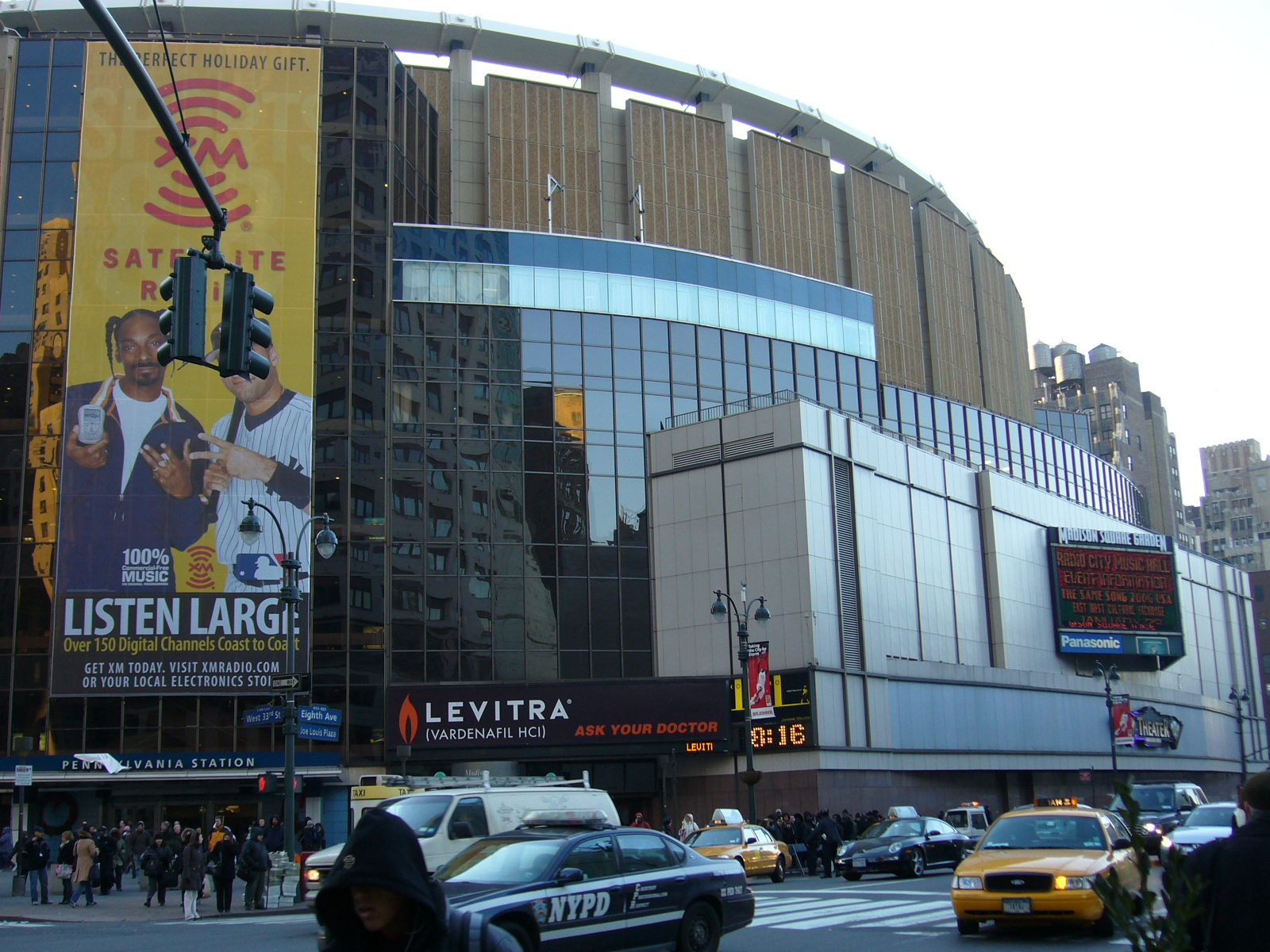
The current version of Madison Square Garden has been the home of the Knicks since 1968.

On February 9, 2000, Cablevision spun off the MSG properties, including the sports franchises, into The Madison Square Garden Company. Despite the loss of Ewing, the Knicks remained successful in the regular season, as they posted a 48–34 record under the direction of Houston and Sprewell. In the first round of playoff contention, however, New York fell to the Toronto Raptors in five games, failing to get past the first round of the playoffs for the first time in a decade. After a poor start to the season, the Knicks managed to get above .500 with a 10–9 record. In spite of their recent success, Van Gundy unexpectedly resigned as head coach on December 8, 2001, explaining he had "lost focus" and would no longer be able to properly coach the team. The team, which named longtime assistant Don Chaney as their new head coach, ended the season with a 30–52 record, and for the first time since the 1986–87 season they did not qualify for the playoffs.

In October 2002, the team elected to extend Chaney's contract for another year. Rather than rebuilding, the Knicks opted to add veterans to the roster including Antonio McDyess who had been dealing with knee problems in the preceding years. Furthermore, the Knicks were criticized by many analysts as multiple players on the roster were overpaid in light of their poor performances, causing salary cap problems that would persist until Donnie Walsh took over as team president. McDyess injured his knee during the team's third preseason game and was subjected to further operations in April 2003 after a CT scan revealed the injured knee necessitated he undergo bone-graft surgery. The Knicks managed only seven wins in their first twenty games, setting the tone for the rest of the season which they completed with a 37–45 record; it was their second consecutive season without a playoff appearance.

=== 2003–2008: The Isiah Thomas years ===
==== 2003–2006: Thomas as general manager ====
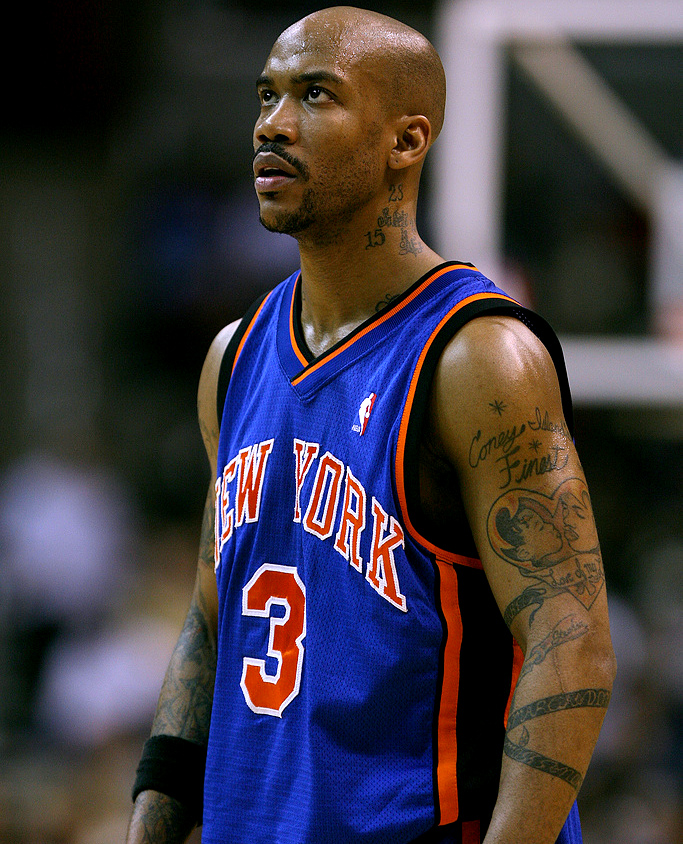
Stephon Marbury played with the Knicks from 2004–2008

After a 10–18 start to the 2003–04 season, the Knicks underwent a massive overhaul. Isiah Thomas was named the Knicks' president on December 22, 2003, upon the firing of Scott Layden. Thomas continued to restructure the team, firing Chaney after an unproductive tenure and hiring Hall of Famer Lenny Wilkens to coach the team. Additionally, Thomas orchestrated multiple trades, including one that brought point guard Stephon Marbury to the team. The team qualified for the playoffs that year with a 39–43 record, but were swept by the New Jersey Nets in the first round. The series included a highly publicized spat between the Knicks' Tim Thomas and Nets' Kenyon Martin, in which Thomas all but challenged Martin to a fight and called him "Fugazy." The following season, the Knicks struggled to a 17–22 record before Wilkens resigned as head coach. Herb Williams, who had previously coached the team in a game against the Orlando Magic prior to the team hiring Wilkens, took over as interim head coach for the remainder of the season and did not fare much better as the Knicks ended their season with a 33–49 record and out of playoff contention. Hoping to find a leader that could put the team back on track, New York hired Larry Brown to coach the team. Brown, who idolized the team during his childhood, was well regarded for his coaching abilities and his arrival brought a sense of hope to the franchise. Hoping to find the next Patrick Ewing, the Knicks drafted center Channing Frye and signed centers Jerome James and Eddy Curry, the former prior to the season and the latter during the season. Curry, who reportedly had a worrying heart condition, refused to take a controversial DNA test, and fell out of favor with John Paxson, Chicago's general manager. The Bulls signed-and-traded him to the Knicks along with Antonio Davis for Tim Thomas, Michael Sweetney, the Knicks 2006 first-round pick, and the right to swap first-round picks with the Knicks in 2007, as well as 2007 and 2009 second-round picks. Isiah Thomas did not lottery-protect the picks, and the Knicks forfeited the second pick in the 2006 draft, and the ninth in the 2007 draft. With a bloated payroll, the Knicks stumbled to the second worst record in the NBA that season, at 23–59. The season concluded with the firing and $18.5 million buy-out of head coach Larry Brown after one season.

==== 2006–2008: Thomas as GM and head coach ====
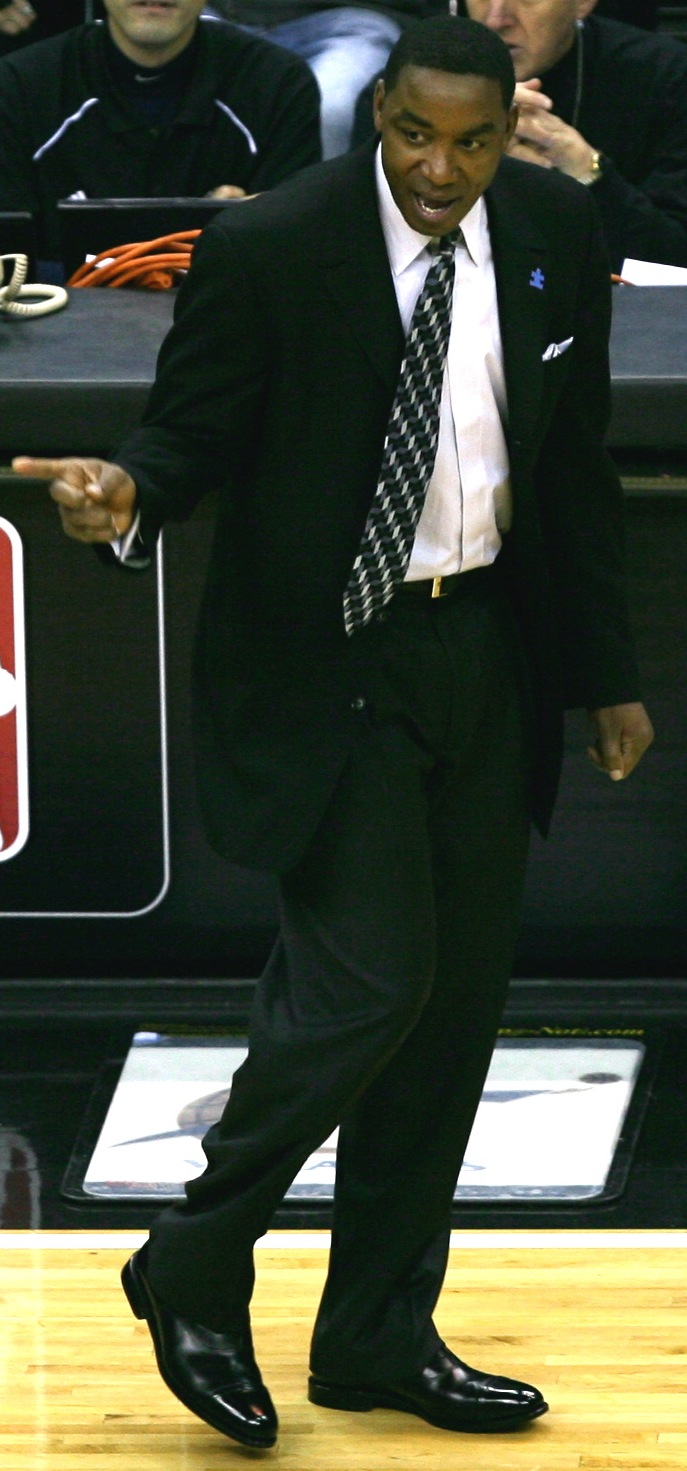
Isiah Thomas as Head Coach of the Knicks

With the departure of Brown, team president Isiah Thomas took over the head coaching responsibilities. Thomas continued his practice of signing players to high priced contracts while the franchise struggled to capitalize on their talent on the court. As a testament to their struggles, on December 16, 2006, the Knicks and the Denver Nuggets broke into a brawl during their game in Madison Square Garden. With multiple players still serving a suspension as a result of the brawl, on December 20, 2006, David Lee created one of the most memorable plays in recent Knicks history, and served as a bright spot as the team's struggles persisted, during a game against the Charlotte Bobcats. With a tie game and 0.1 seconds left on the game clock in double overtime, Jamal Crawford inbounded from the sideline, near half-court. The ball sailed towards the basket, and with that 0.1 seconds still remaining on the game clock, Lee tipped the ball off of the backboard and into the hoop. Because of the Trent Tucker Rule, a player is allowed solely to tip the ball to score when the ball is put back into play with three-tenths of a second or less remaining. Because of this rule, the rarity of Lee's play increases. The Knicks won, 111–109 in double overtime. The Knicks improved by ten games in the 2006–2007 campaign in spite of injuries that ravaged the team at the end of the year; they ended with a 33–49 record, avoiding a 50-loss season by defeating the Charlotte Bobcats 94–93 on the last day of the season. During the 2007 offseason, the organization became embroiled in further controversy away from the basketball court. Anucha Browne Sanders, a former Knicks executive, had filed a sexual harassment lawsuit against Isiah Thomas and Madison Square Garden. Faced with a trial, the jury returned a verdict finding Thomas and Madison Square Garden liable for sexual harassment. The jury also levied $11.6 million in punitive damages against Madison Square Garden, though this was later reduced to $11.5 million in a settlement between both parties. The ordeal proved embarrassing for the franchise, revealing sordid details about Knicks management and the environment at Madison Square Garden. The Knicks struggled as they opened their 2007 campaign with a 2–9 record leaving many Knicks fans, frustrated with the franchise's lack of progress under Thomas, called for the coach's firing—the chant "Fire Isiah" became a common occurrence during the Knicks' home games. On November 29, 2007, the Knicks were handed one of their worst defeats in their history by the Boston Celtics, with a final score of 104–59. This matched their third-largest margin of defeat. New York went on to post an eighth consecutive losing season and tied the franchise mark for their worst record ever, at 23–59.

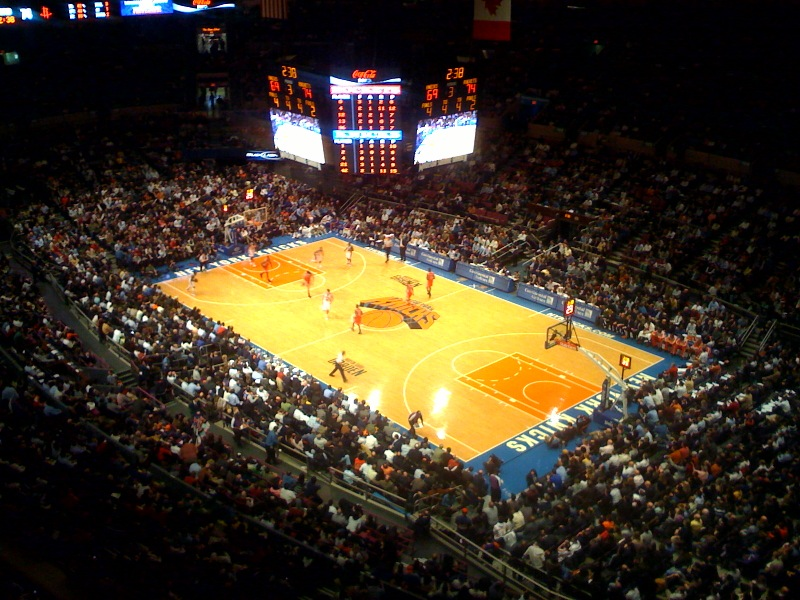
The Knicks in action at Madison Square Garden in the 2008–09 season.

=== 2008–2010: Donnie Walsh ===
MSG chairman James Dolan hired former Indiana Pacers President Donnie Walsh on April 2, 2008, to take over Isiah Thomas's role as team president. At the introductory press conference, Walsh, while not proclaiming to be a savior, did set goals which included getting the team under the salary cap and bringing back a competitive environment.

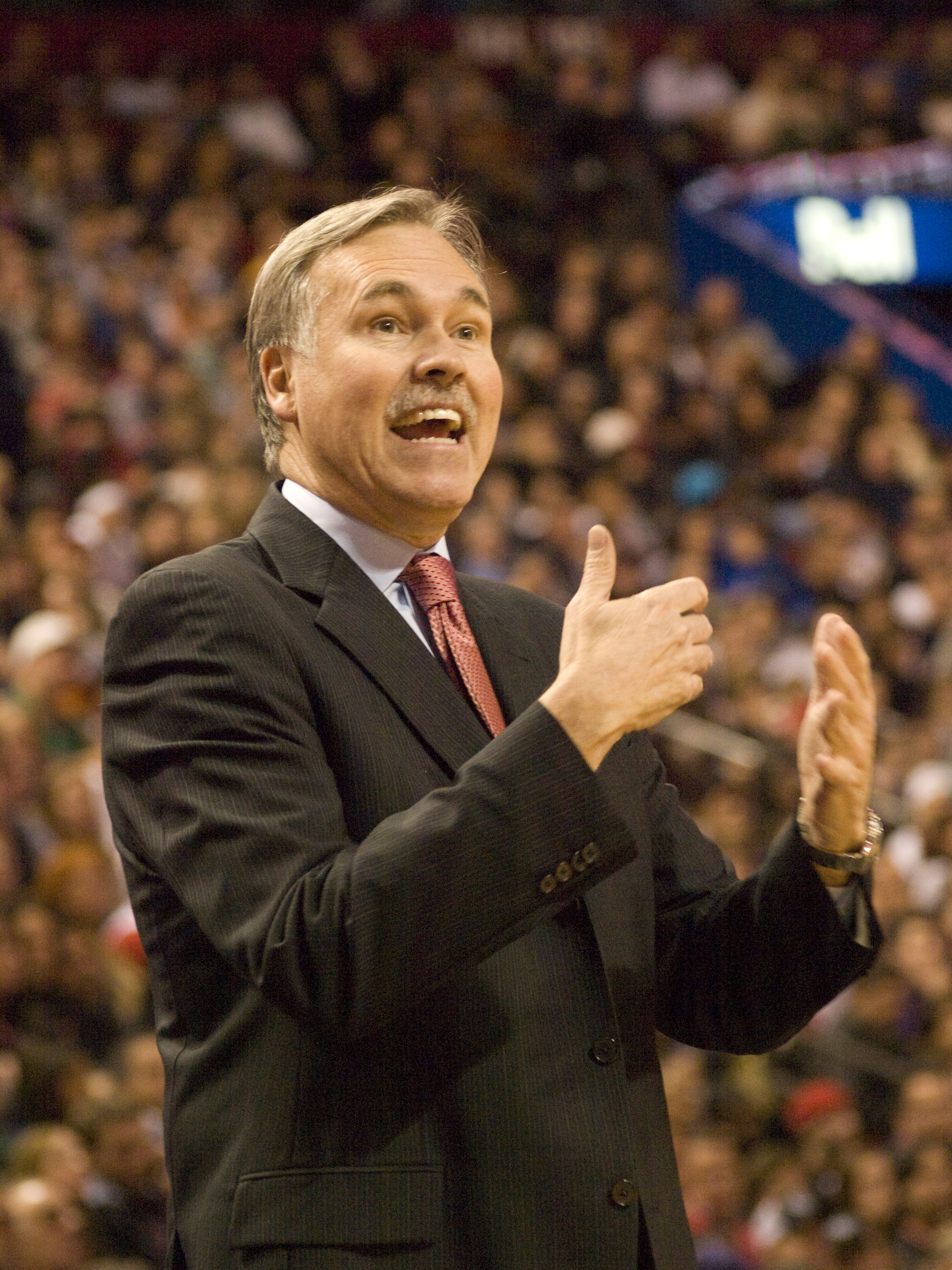
Mike D'Antoni, head coach of the Knicks from 2008–2012.

Upon the conclusion of the 2007–2008 regular season, Walsh fired Thomas, and on May 13, 2008, officially named former Phoenix Suns head coach Mike D'Antoni as head coach. D'Antoni signed a four-year, $24 million deal to coach the team. The Knicks, holding the sixth pick in the 2008 NBA draft, selected Danilo Gallinari on May 20, 2008.

On November 21, 2008, the Knicks dealt one of their top scorers, Jamal Crawford, to the Golden State Warriors for Al Harrington. Hours later, New York traded Zach Randolph, along with Mardy Collins, to the Los Angeles Clippers for Cuttino Mobley and Tim Thomas, with the intention of freeing cap space for the 2010 offseason, when top-flight players such as LeBron James, Dwyane Wade, Chris Bosh, and Amar'e Stoudemire would be available. In February 2009, the Knicks traded Tim Thomas, Jerome James, and Anthony Roberson to the Chicago Bulls for Larry Hughes, in addition to sending Malik Rose to the Oklahoma City Thunder for Chris Wilcox.

Additionally, the long-standing controversy with Stephon Marbury ended when the two sides agreed to a buy-out of Marbury's contract, which allowed him to sign with the Celtics when he cleared waivers on February 27, 2009. In spite of a volatile roster, the Knicks improved by nine wins from the previous season in D'Antoni's first season, to finish 32–50, coinciding with the emergence of forward-center David Lee, who led the league with 65 double-doubles, and the continued development of guard Nate Robinson and swingman Wilson Chandler.

In the 2009 NBA draft, the Knicks selected forward Jordan Hill eighth after targets such as Stephen Curry, Jonny Flynn, and Ricky Rubio were off the board. Guard Toney Douglas was then selected 29th with a pick which was acquired from the Los Angeles Lakers. Shortly afterwards, New York executed a trade with the Memphis Grizzlies in which the Knicks acquired Darko Miličić in exchange for Quentin Richardson. The Knicks got off to their worst ten-game start in franchise history, producing nine losses, with just one win. The Knicks responded by winning nine games and losing six in December. On January 24, 2010, the Knicks suffered their worst home loss in Madison Square Garden history against the Dallas Mavericks in front of a sellout crowd. The 50-point loss was also the second-worst in Knicks franchise history.

On February 17, the Knicks shook up the roster, trading Miličić to the Minnesota Timberwolves for Brian Cardinal and cash considerations. A day later, the Knicks and Celtics swapped guard Nate Robinson for shooting guard Eddie House. The deal also included forward Marcus Landry going to the Celtics and the Knicks acquiring bench players J. R. Giddens and Bill Walker. The Knicks also acquired All-Star forward Tracy McGrady from the Houston Rockets and point guard Sergio Rodríguez from the Sacramento Kings in a three-way trade. The deal sent Knicks shooting guard Larry Hughes to Sacramento and forward Jordan Hill and power forward Jared Jeffries to Houston. The trades, orchestrated to give the Knicks more cap space for the summer of 2010, netted the Knicks $30 million of cap space. About three weeks after these team-changing trades, the Knicks played the Dallas Mavericks at American Airlines Center and blew them out by a score of 128–94 for their largest win of the season. However, the Knicks were eliminated from playoff contention in late March 2010 and completed their season with a 29–53 record, a regression from their first season under D'Antoni.

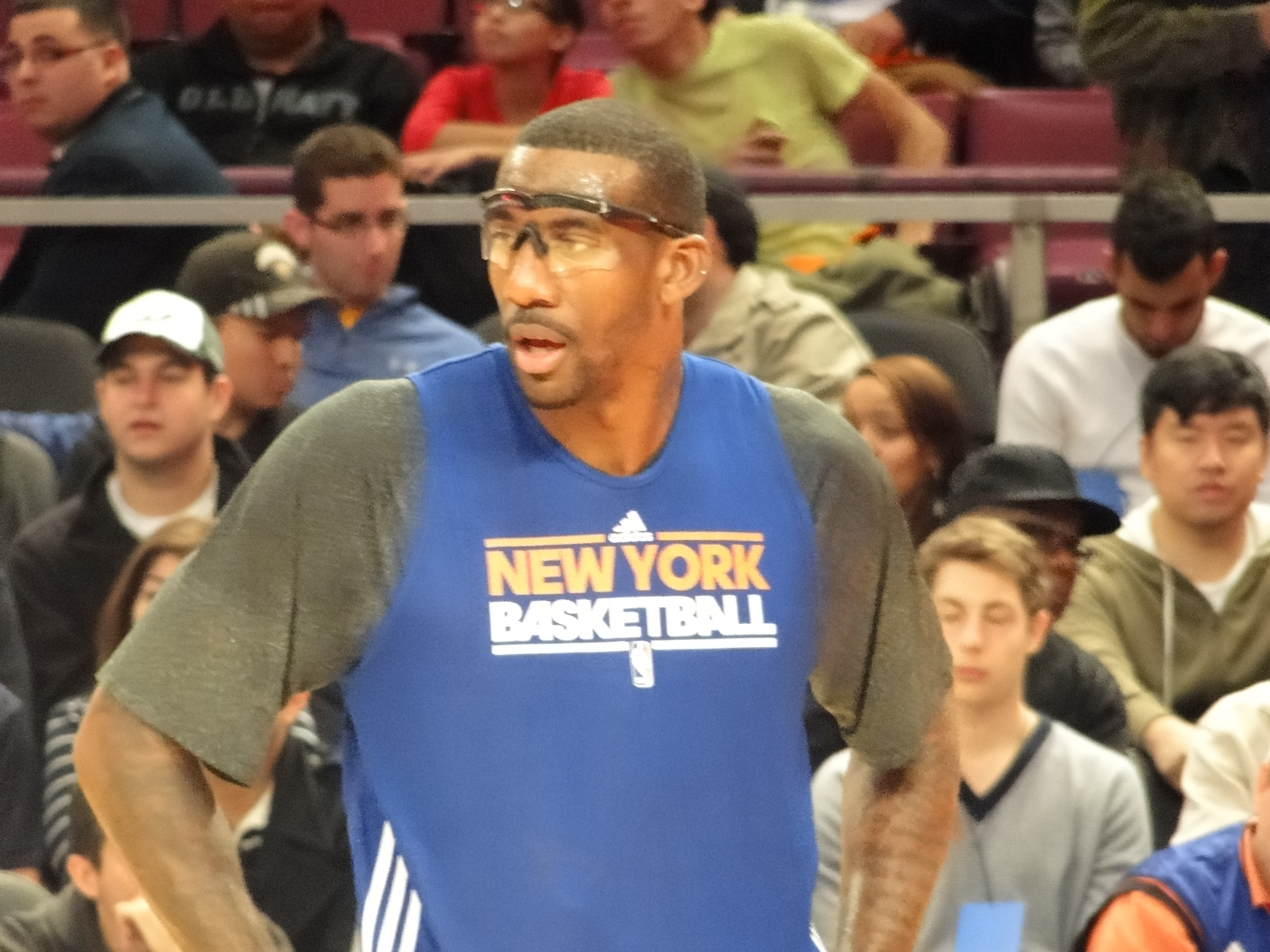
Amar'e Stoudemire, NBA Rookie of the Year in 2003, has played for the Knicks from 2010 until 2015.

The Knicks and former Phoenix Suns forward-center Amar'e Stoudemire came to an agreement on July 5, 2010. The sign and trade deal was made official on July 8 as Stoudemire agreed to an approximately $100 million contract over the span of five years. Team president Donnie Walsh stated the signing of Stoudemire as a turning point for the future of a Knicks team that had struggled in recent years. The Knicks continued to redesign their roster, trading David Lee to the Golden State Warriors for Anthony Randolph, Kelenna Azubuike and Ronny Turiaf. The Knicks also struck deals with former Bobcats point guard Raymond Felton and Russian center Timofey Mozgov. The Knicks regained their title as the most valuable franchise in the NBA following these acquisitions, though this was mainly due to the arrival of Stoudemire, whose star power allowed the team to resurge; the Knicks sold out their full-season ticket inventory for the first time since 2002.

=== 2011–2017: The Carmelo Anthony years ===
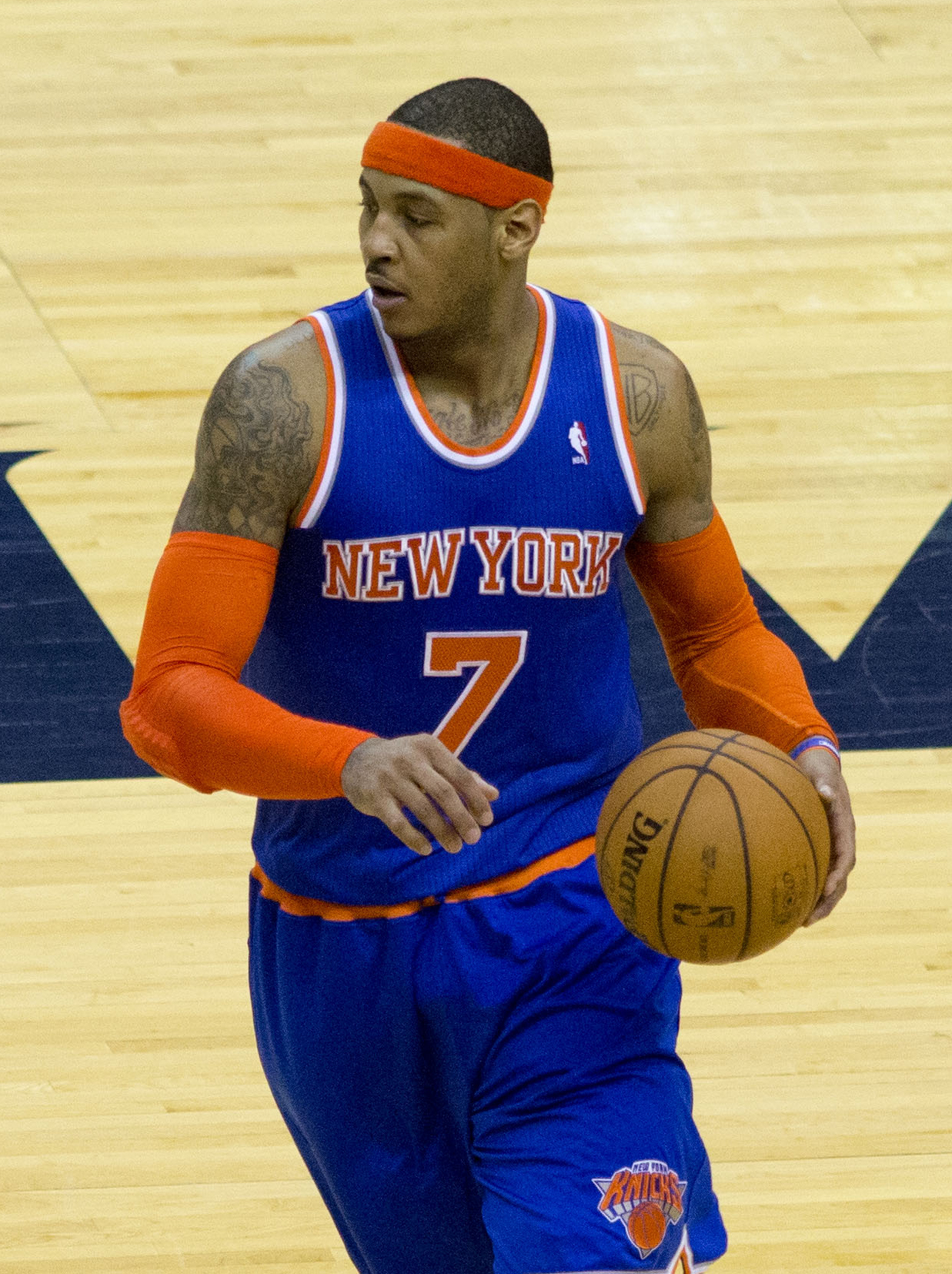
Carmelo Anthony, an eight-time NBA All-Star, joined the Knicks in 2011.

D'Antoni along with Stoudemire and the core of young players, including Felton, Danilo Gallinari, Mozgov, Wilson Chandler and rookie Landry Fields, piloted the Knicks to a 28–26 record prior to the All-Star break, marking the first time the team had been above the .500 mark at that point of the season since 2000. In spite of the team's mounting success,

New York made a push to acquire Denver Nuggets forward Carmelo Anthony. After months of speculation, on February 22, 2011, Anthony was traded to New York, with teammates Chauncey Billups, Shelden Williams, Anthony Carter, and former Knick Renaldo Balkman. Denver acquired Felton, Danilo Gallinari, Wilson Chandler, Mozgov, Kosta Koufos, a 2014 first-round draft pick, the Warriors' second-round draft picks for 2013 and 2014 and $3 million in cash. In addition, the Knicks sent Anthony Randolph and Eddy Curry to the Minnesota Timberwolves and in return the Timberwolves' Corey Brewer was sent to the Knicks.

The Knicks clinched their first playoff berth since the 2004 NBA Playoffs in a rout of the Cleveland Cavaliers on April 3, 2011. Carmelo Anthony ensured the franchise's first winning season since 2000 on April 10, 2011, against the Indiana Pacers, as Anthony scored the game-winning basket for the Knicks and subsequently blocked Danny Granger's shot in the final seconds of the game. The Knicks were ultimately eliminated from contention in the first round on April 24, 2011, by the Boston Celtics, losing the series 0–4.

In spite of Donnie Walsh's successful efforts to help rebuild the franchise, he decided not to return as the team's president, electing to step down at the end of June 2011, citing the uncertainty surrounding his ability to continue to manage the daily operations of the team. Glen Grunwald was elected as interim president and general manager.

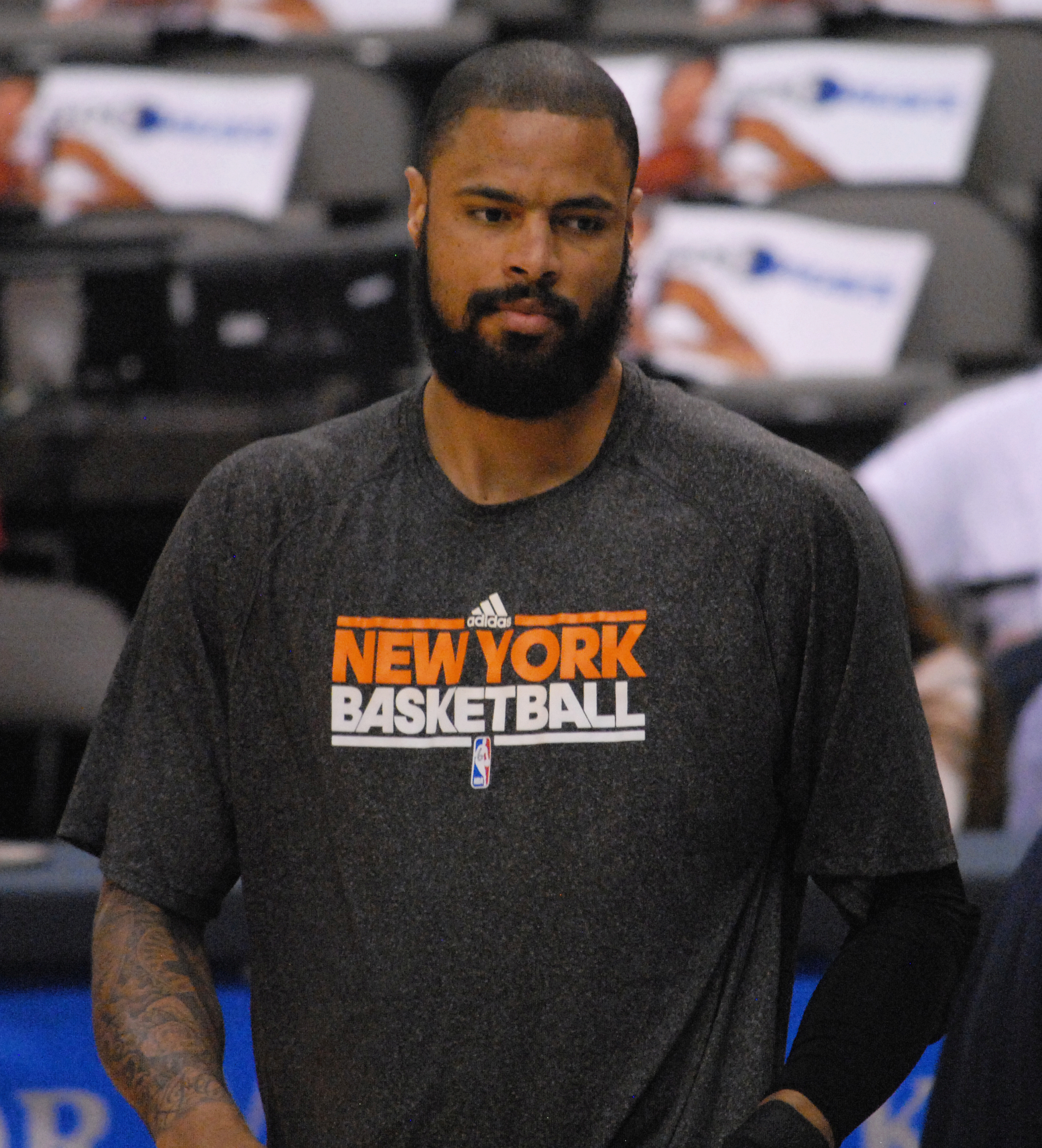
Tyson Chandler played for the Knicks from 2011 to 2014, earning an NBA Defensive Player of the Year Award with New York.

Following the conclusion of the 2011 NBA lockout, the Knicks engaged in a sign-and-trade deal with the Mavericks for center Tyson Chandler on December 10, 2011, with Chandler signing a four-year contract worth approximately $58 million. In return, the Knicks sent Andy Rautins to the Mavericks, generating a trade exception for Dallas. Ronny Turiaf and $3 million in cash considerations were sent to the Wizards to complete the three-way trade. The Knicks also obtained the draft rights to Ahmad Nivins and Georgios Printezis from Dallas. In order to fit Chandler under the salary cap, Chauncey Billups was earlier waived under the amnesty clause of the new collective bargaining agreement. To replace Billups at point guard, the Knicks signed Mike Bibby to a one-year, veteran minimum contract. The Knicks also signed veteran point guard Baron Davis on December 19 to a one-year contract. At the time, Davis had suffered a herniated disk and was not expected to compete for about 6–8 weeks, leaving Toney Douglas as the team's starting point guard. The Knicks struggled early in the season because Douglas and Bibby struggled to facilitate the offense and subsequently, it became stagnated. Subsequently, rookie Iman Shumpert was thrust into the role as the starting point guard after Douglas was relegated to the bench due to his struggles. In addition, head coach D'Antoni also decided to use Carmelo Anthony as a point forward to help generate a more up-tempo offense; however, there were concerns Anthony was holding the ball for too long, thus contributing to the stagnation of the Knicks' offense.

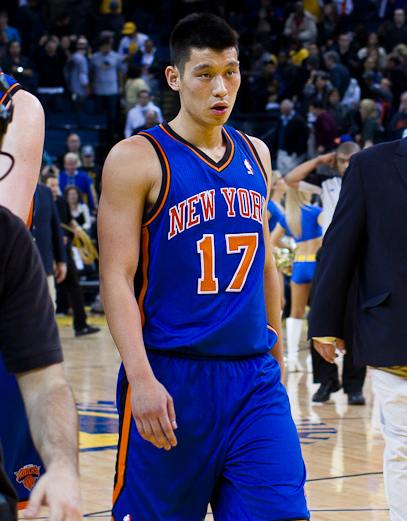
Jeremy Lin enjoyed a breakout season in 2011–12.

With the Knicks struggling to an 8–15 record, D'Antoni inserted third-string point guard Jeremy Lin into the rotation against the New Jersey Nets on February 4, 2012. Lin, who had been claimed off waivers on December 27 following an injury to Iman Shumpert, scored 25 points and had 7 assists en route to a Knicks win. Lin was praised for his ability to facilitate the offense, something the Knicks had struggled to do for the first 23 games of the season. Lin, exceeding expectations, was named the starter for the Knicks following a game against the Utah Jazz. Lin guided the Knicks to a seven-game winning streak, despite being without Anthony and Amar'e Stoudemire for five games due to a groin injury and a death in the family respectively, that brought the team back to a .500 winning percentage. The surge of positive play by the Knicks accompanied by the performance of Lin caused extensive national and worldwide media coverage that was referred to as 'Linsanity'. To bolster their depth and perimeter shooting percentage, the Knicks signed J. R. Smith on February 18, 2012. The team struggled to congeal when Anthony returned from injury and went on to lose seven of eight games before head coach Mike D'Antoni resigned on March 14, 2012. Assistant Mike Woodson was named the interim head coach.

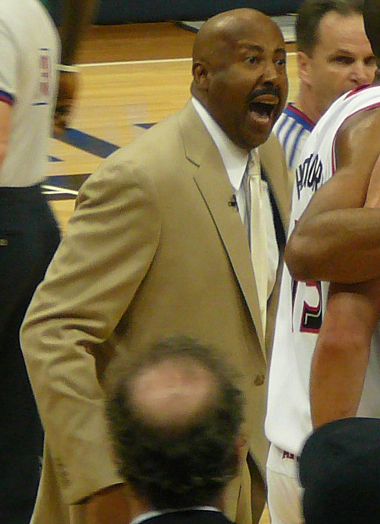
Mike Woodson, head coach of the Knicks from 2012 to 2014

Under Woodson, the Knicks finished 18–6 during the regular season and clinched a playoff spot for the second straight year this time as the seventh seed, making it the first time they have clinched consecutive playoff berths since making 13 straight playoff appearances from 1988 to 2001. Not only did they also clinch consecutive winning seasons for the first time in a decade, but their 36–30 record was the highest winning percentage for the team since the 2000–01 NBA season. The Knicks faced the Miami Heat in the first round of the playoffs and lost the first three games, breaking the NBA record for longest playoff losing streak at 13 games. The team's struggles were partially attributed to injuries as Jeremy Lin, Baron Davis and Iman Shumpert were all sidelined by knee ailments. The Knicks proceeded to win a close Game 4, which snapped their streak and ensured that they would not be swept out of the first round however, they failed to keep up with the Heat's up-tempo offense in Game 5 and lost the series 4–1. Despite the team's disappointing postseason exit, the Knicks removed Woodson's interim status and he was officially named the full-time head coach on May 25, 2012.

The Knicks began their offseason by selecting Greek forward Kostas Papanikolaou in the 2012 NBA draft. One week later, the team came to terms with veteran point guard Jason Kidd, who was originally supposed to serve as a backup to Lin. The Knicks also re-acquired Marcus Camby from the Houston Rockets in a sign and trade sending Houston Josh Harrellson, Jerome Jordan, Toney Douglas and 2014 and 2015 two second round picks and completed a sign-and-trade with the Portland Trail Blazers that brought back Raymond Felton and Kurt Thomas in exchange for Jared Jeffries, Dan Gadzuric, and the draft rights to Papanikolaou and Greek forward Georgios Printezis, whose draft rights had been acquired by the Knicks in December 2011. The Knicks also re-signed free agents J. R. Smith and Steve Novak and added more players to the roster, such as James White, Chris Copeland, and Argentinian point guard Pablo Prigioni. However the Knicks lost restricted free agents shooting guard, Landry Fields to the Toronto Raptors and point guard, Jeremy Lin to the Houston Rockets, who were both key players during the 2011–12 NBA season. The Knicks decided not to match those teams' offers. Despite these losses, the Knicks continued to add players to the roster, signing former Chicago Bulls guard Ronnie Brewer on July 25, 2012, and signing Chris Smith, the younger brother of J. R. Smith, on August 1, 2012. It was also announced that Rasheed Wallace would come out of retirement to play for the Knicks on October 2, 2012.

Despite playing without an injured Iman Shumpert and Amar'e Stoudemire, the Knicks compiled an 18–5 record to start the season, their best start since 1993. In their first four games, they scored at least 100 points and won by double digits in all of those games. The streak ended after a 10-point loss to Memphis Grizzlies. The following Sunday, in a game against the Indiana Pacers, the Knicks at home went on to win 88–76, assuring them a 7–1 record. After two tough losses to the Dallas Mavericks and Houston Rockets, the Knicks returned home in a game against the Detroit Pistons on November 25, with a 121–100 blowout win, making them one of only three teams undefeated at home along with the Miami Heat and Utah Jazz. The Knicks finished November with an 11–4 record, their best month record since going 11–6 in March 2000. By the All-Star break in mid-February 2013, the Knicks compiled a 32–18 record, good for second in the Eastern Conference. On February 21, on the trade deadline, the team traded Ronnie Brewer for a 2014 second-round draft pick. The Knicks then signed veteran power forward Kenyon Martin to a 10-day contract. In late March, the Knicks went on to compile a four-game losing streak, tying their worst skid of the season. They would go on and face the Jazz on the road, eventually winning the game and starting what would turn out to be a 13-game winning streak, including wins against the Miami Heat and the Oklahoma City Thunder. This was the third-longest winning streak in franchise history. On April 9, the Knicks beat the Washington Wizards to secure the Atlantic Division title for the first time since the 1993–94 NBA season. The Knicks' 13-game winning streak came to an end on April 11 as they lost to the Chicago Bulls. Despite that, they set the NBA single season record for three-pointers. On May 3, the Knicks defeated the Boston Celtics in the first round of the NBA playoffs, 4–2, their first playoff victory since 2000. On May 18, the Knicks were eliminated in the second round of the playoffs, losing the series to the Indiana Pacers 4–2. Point guard Jason Kidd retired following the end of the season—he was named head coach of the Brooklyn Nets a few days later. In the 2013 NBA draft, the Knicks selected Tim Hardaway Jr as the 24th pick in the first round. During the 2013 offseason, The Knicks claimed Los Angeles Lakers F Metta World Peace off of waivers. They resigned J. R Smith to a 3-year, $18 million deal and traded G Quentin Richardson, F Steve Novak, C Marcus Camby, and three draft picks to acquire F/C Andrea Bargnani from the Toronto Raptors.

On September 26, 2013, the Knicks announced that they had replaced GM Glen Grunwald with former MSG president Steve Mills. On March 10, 2014, the Knicks announced that they had purchased an NBA D-League team that would play in White Plains at the start of the 2014–15 NBDL season. Forbes magazine released its franchise value rankings for NBA teams on January 22, listing the Knicks as the world's most valuable basketball organization at $1.4 billion, edging out the Los Angeles Lakers by $50 million. The Knicks were valued at 40% more than the third-place Chicago Bulls valuation of $1 billion, and were valued nearly twice as highly as their crosstown rivals, the Brooklyn Nets, who came in at $780 million.

On January 24, 2014, Carmelo Anthony established his career high, the Knicks' franchise record, and the Madison Square Garden record for single-game scoring with a 62–point 13–rebound effort against the Charlotte Bobcats.

On March 18, 2014, the Knicks and Phil Jackson announced that he had been named president of the organization with Steve Mills remaining general manager. Both Jackson and Mills will report directly to MSG chairman James Dolan. On April 21, 2014, over one week after the conclusion of the Knicks' season, Mike Woodson and his entire staff were fired. The Knicks finished the season with a 37–45 record and finished 9th in the Eastern Conference standings.

On June 9, 2014, the Knicks hired Derek Fisher, who played under Phil Jackson as a Laker and won five championships together, as the head coach.

On June 25, 2014, the Knicks traded guard Raymond Felton along with former NBA defensive player of the year Tyson Chandler to the Dallas Mavericks. In return the Knicks received Shane Larkin, José Calderón, Samuel Dalembert, and Wayne Ellington along with two picks for the following day's draft. The trade was the first one that Phil Jackson ever executed as a front office executive. On June 26, as part of the 2014 NBA draft, the Knicks selected Cleanthony Early as the 34th overall pick and Thanasis Antetokounmpo as the 51st overall pick, using the draft picks received in the trade from the Mavericks. The Knicks also acquired Louis Labeyrie, an additional second-round draft pick, after he was traded by the Pacers.

On January 7, 2015, the Knicks set a franchise record with their 13th straight loss. The Knicks fell 101–91 to the Washington Wizards, giving New York its longest losing streak in the franchise's 69-year history. This record was extended to a 16th straight loss after the NBA Global Games loss against the Milwaukee Bucks in London.

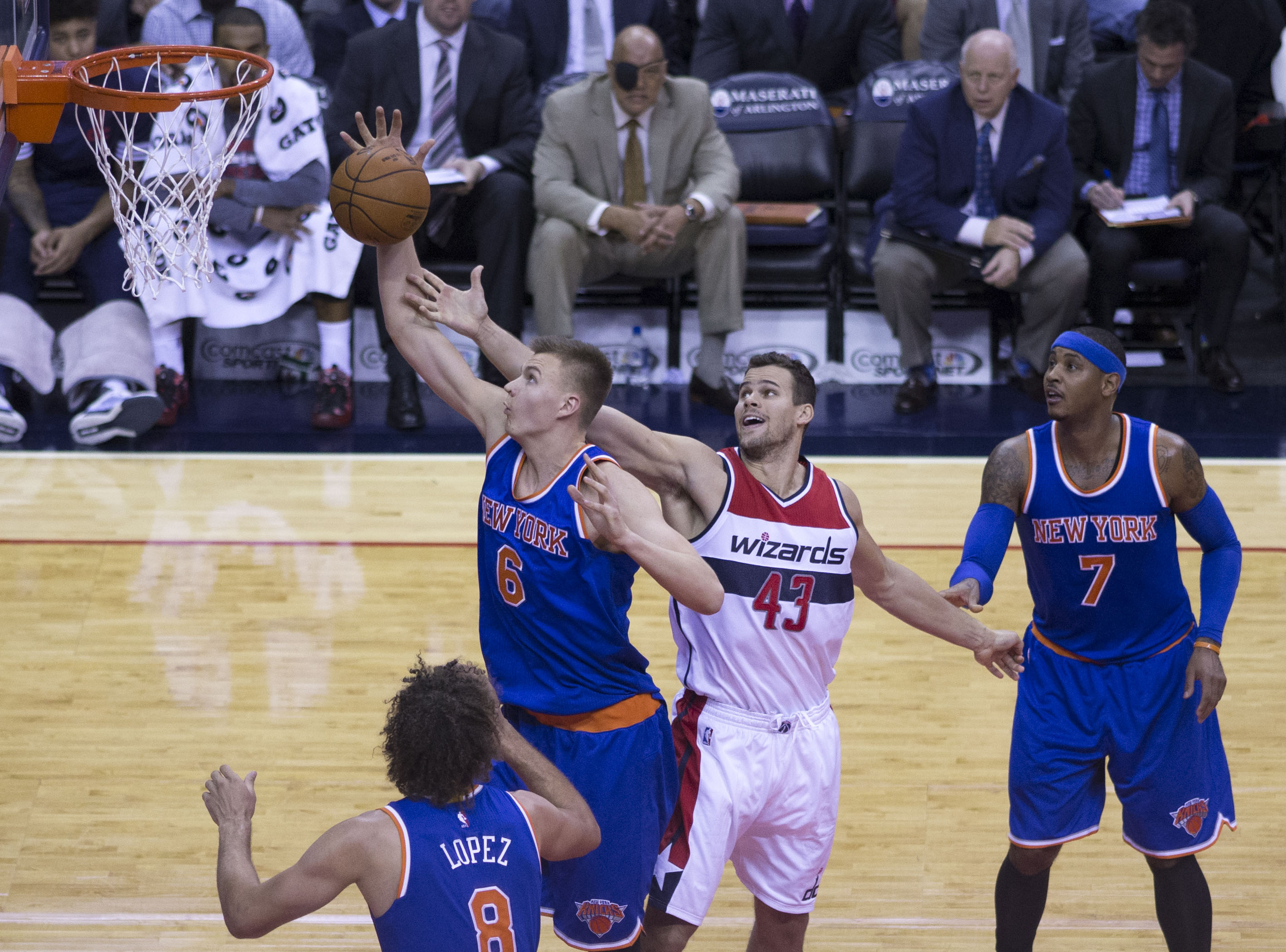
Porziņģis as an NBA rookie against the Washington Wizards

On February 15, 2015, the Knicks bought out Amar'e Stoudemire's contract.

The Knicks finished their 2014–15 season with a record of 17–65, which is the worst record in franchise history.

On June 25, 2015, The Knicks drafted Latvian Kristaps Porziņģis with the fourth overall pick in the 2015 NBA draft. He was booed by the New York crowd upon his selection, but vowed to change the fans' opinions of him.

On July 30, 2015, Porziņģis signed his rookie-scale contract with the Knicks. In four Summer League games, Porziņģis averaged 10.5 points and 3.2 rebounds per game. He made his debut for the Knicks in the team's season opener against the Milwaukee Bucks on October 28, recording 16 points and 5 rebounds in a 122–97 win. On November 2, he recorded his first career double-double with 13 points and 14 rebounds in a loss to the San Antonio Spurs. On November 21, he had a season-best game with 24 points, 14 rebounds and 7 blocks in a 107–102 win over the Houston Rockets.

Midway through another losing season, Fisher was relieved of his coaching duties, with Kurt Rambis being named as interim head coach as the Knicks finished the 2015-2016 season with a record of 32–50. Jeff Hornacek was then hired as their next head coach, which also oversaw Jackson's most notable acts as an executive. On June 22, former NBA MVP Derrick Rose was traded, along with Justin Holiday and a second-round pick from Chicago, to New York in exchange for Robin Lopez, José Calderón and Grant. The Knicks also signed Joakim Noah, Brandon Jennings, and Courtney Lee to contracts worth a combined $127 million, and regressed the following season, causing the franchise to part ways with Jackson after three years as the Knicks' president of basketball operations. Under Jackson's presidency, the Knicks had gone 80–166, suffered three consecutive losing seasons, and missed three consecutive playoffs.

In his last act prior to leaving the Knicks, Jackson selected Frank Ntilikina with the eighth overall pick, Damyean Dotson with the 44th overall pick, and Ognjen Jaramaz with the 58th overall pick in the 2017 NBA draft.

Following Jackson's departure, the Knicks appointed Scott Perry as general manager and named Steve Mills president of basketball operations. The Knicks also saw Carmelo Anthony demanding a trade from the team, which posed difficulty for both player and franchise due to a no-trade clause inserted in Anthony's contract given by Jackson in 2013. Originally, the only teams for which he would waive his no-trade clause were for the Cleveland Cavaliers and the Houston Rockets, with the former eventually removed from trade discussions due to internal conflicts. Anthony intended to join the Rockets, with a three-way trade with the Portland Trail Blazers set up involving Ryan Anderson. Anderson's three-year, $60 million contract was not feasibly able to be absorbed by either franchise, however, causing Perry to cease talks with the Rockets, before agreeing to a deal with the Oklahoma City Thunder, after Anthony agreed to expand his no-trade clause to include the Thunder. The Knicks received Enes Kanter, Doug McDermott and a 2018 second-round pick in exchange for Anthony on September 25, 2017, while also positioning Kristaps Porziņģis as the new centerpiece of the franchise. The Knicks also re-signed Tim Hardaway Jr. to a four-year, $71 million contract, while also agreeing to a one-year, minimum contract with Michael Beasley.

=== 2018–2022: Struggles and resurgence ===
In February 2018, the franchise traded for former lottery pick Emmanuel Mudiay from the Denver Nuggets at the trade deadline, who was a point guard the Knicks were rumored to have targeted prior to selecting Porziņģis in 2015. The trade also included the Dallas Mavericks, with Dallas acquiring McDermott from the Knicks, and the Nuggets obtaining Devin Harris from Dallas. However, the season again ended poorly, with 29–53 record to leave the Knicks as the 11th seed in the Eastern Conference. This caused the Knicks to part ways with head coach Jeff Hornacek. Hornacek's two full seasons retained criticism for the team's continued struggle on defense, as well as the inability to implement an efficient, modern offense. He was replaced with former Memphis Grizzlies head coach David Fizdale. Fizdale signed a four-year deal, and was tasked to deliver on player development and improving the team's basketball philosophy.

On May 15, 2018, the Knicks were awarded the ninth overall pick in the 2018 NBA draft, and selected Kevin Knox II from the Kentucky. The team also acquired Mitchell Robinson with the 36th overall pick, and signed former lottery pick Mario Hezonja. They further invested in untapped potential by signing another former lottery pick, with Noah Vonleh agreeing to a one-year deal. However, following a dismal start to the season, and after a meeting with Porziņģis gave team officials the impression that he wanted to be traded, Porziņģis was traded on January 30, 2019, alongside Trey Burke, Courtney Lee and Tim Hardaway Jr., to the Dallas Mavericks in exchange for DeAndre Jordan, Wesley Matthews, Dennis Smith Jr., an unprotected 2021 first-round draft pick, and an additional top-ten protected 2023 first-round draft pick. The Knicks finished the 2018–19 season with a league worst 17–65 regular season record, but the season was notable for the emergence of undrafted rookie Allonzo Trier, as well as for the progression of Dotson and Robinson. The Knicks won the third overall pick in the 2019 NBA draft, and selected RJ Barrett from Duke. The team also traded for forward Iggy Brazdeikis, who was drafted in the second round from Michigan.

In preparation for the 2019–20 season, and as a result of having a record $74 million in cap space following the Porziņģis trade, the team divided it among five new signings. The Knicks agreed terms with veteran role players Wayne Ellington and Taj Gibson, with forward Bobby Portis also signing. The team then signed former lottery picks Elfrid Payton and Julius Randle. On February 4, 2020, the Knicks fired Steve Mills after seven seasons as president with Scott Perry taking over on an interim basis.

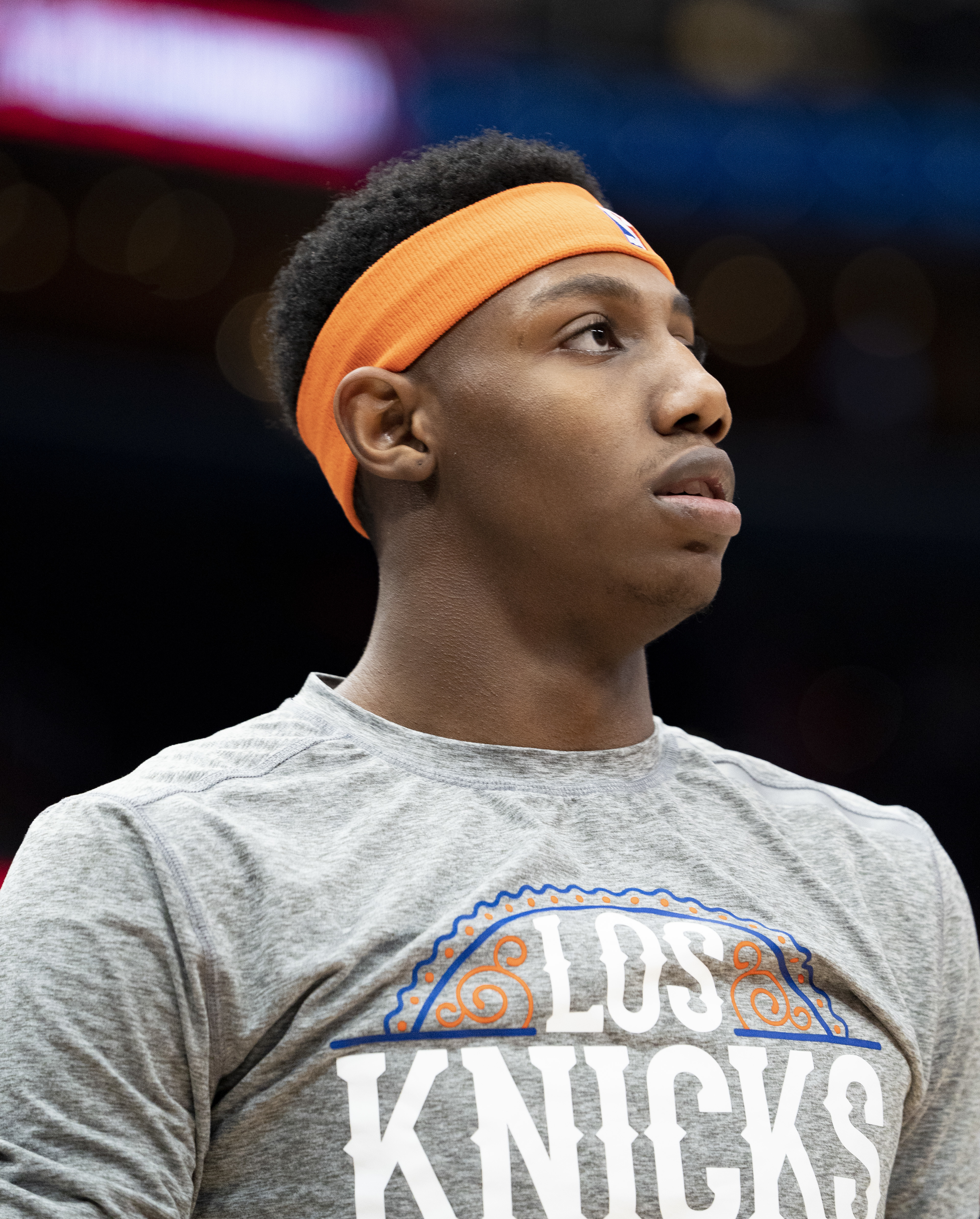
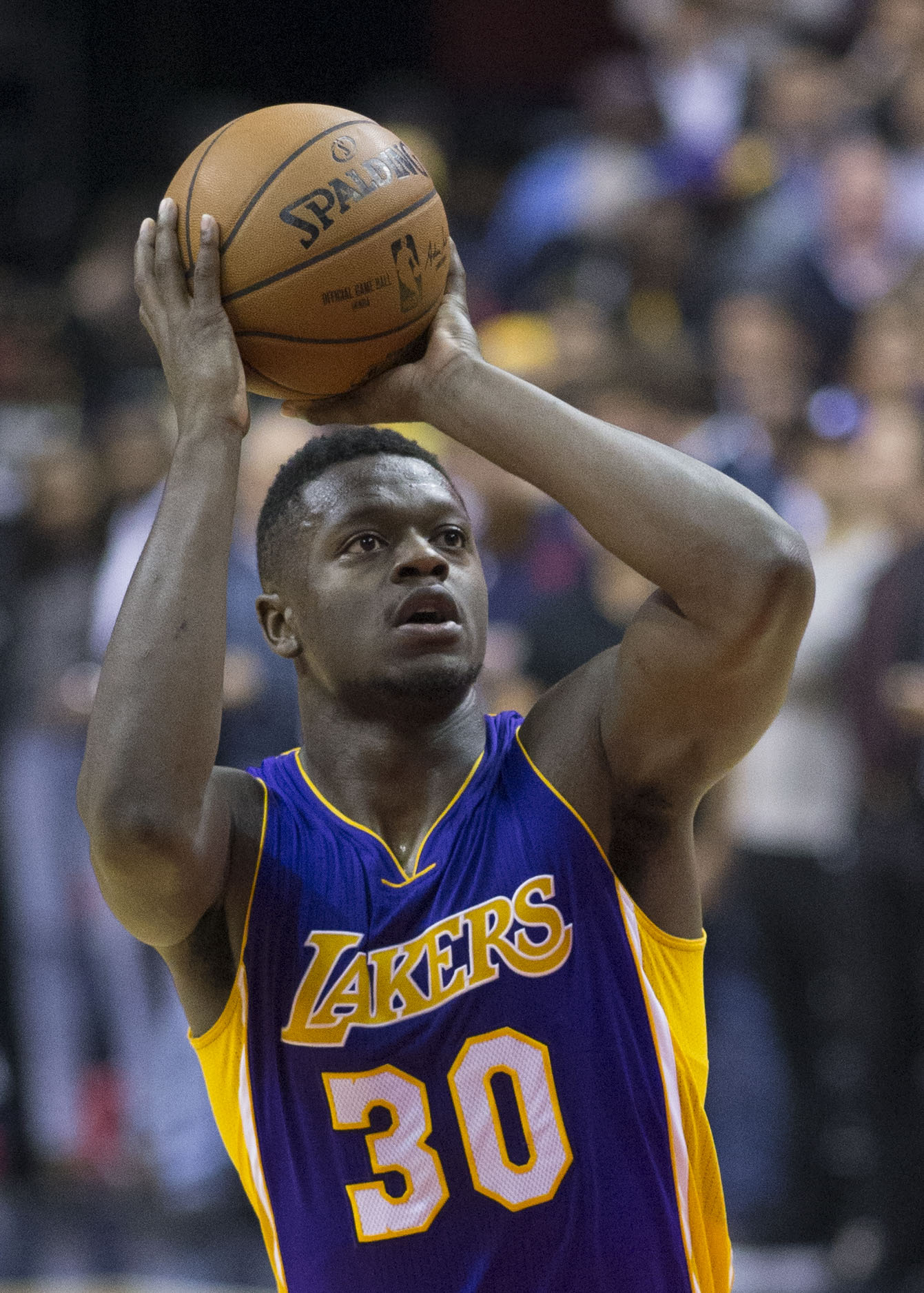
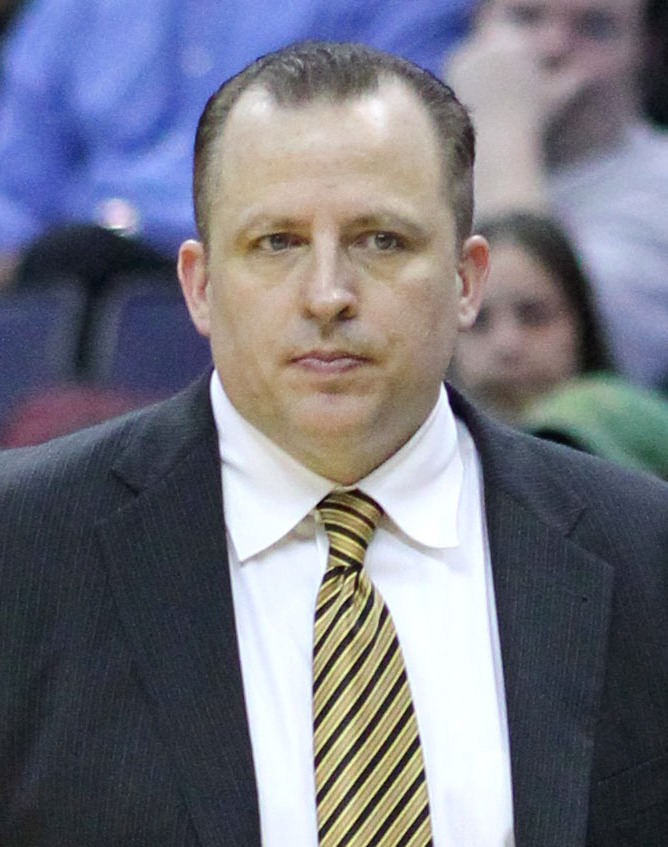
2019 third overall pick guard RJ Barrett, 2021 All-NBA Second Team forward and Most Improved Player Julius Randle, and Coach of the Year Tom Thibodeau led the Knicks to a surprisingly successful 41–31 record in 2020–21 and their first playoff berth in years.

On March 2, 2020, Leon Rose was named president of the team. On July 30, the Knicks announced that they hired Tom Thibodeau as their head coach. Julius Randle had a breakout season and, on February 23, 2021, Randle was named as a reserve for the 2021 NBA All-Star Game. On May 3, with a 118–104 win over the Memphis Grizzlies, the Knicks clinched their first winning season since the 2012–13 season. On May 12, the Knicks clinched their first playoff appearance since 2013, ending their eight-year playoff drought. At the end of the regular season, Randle was named NBA Most Improved Player, while Thibodeau was named the NBA Coach of the Year, becoming the first Knicks head coach since Pat Riley in 1992–93 to receive the award. The Knicks faced the Atlanta Hawks in the first round of the 2021 NBA playoffs as the fourth seed, losing in five games. Fan attendance in home games during the 2020–21 season was prohibited until February 23, 2021, per an executive order from Governor of New York Andrew Cuomo. The Knicks reopened Madison Square Garden to spectators on February 23.

In the 2021 off-season, the Knicks retained much of their old talent, while bringing in former all-star guard Kemba Walker and forward Evan Fournier. Additionally, after Randle's breakthrough season, the Knicks extended his contract for four years in August 2021.

On January 13, 2022, the Knicks traded former eighth overall pick of the 2018 NBA draft, Kevin Knox II and a protected future first round pick in exchange for former 10th overall pick of the 2019 NBA draft, Cam Reddish, Solomon Hill and a 2025 second-round draft pick and cash considerations. During the 2021–22 season, the Knicks struggled regressed finishing 11th in the Eastern Conference with a 37–45 record. Randle took a step back having a down season across the boards and his shooting percentages took a hit that resulted in fans booing Randle and increased trade rumours, and the lack of leadership of Randle was questioned, along with attitude and desire to be a Knick. Head coach Thibodeau was questioned if he was the right coach for the Knicks heading onwards. The signings of guard Kemba Walker and forward Evan Fournier were considered extreme failures that set the Knicks back as well. The third overall pick of the 2019 NBA draft, RJ Barrett in his third season averaged 20.0 points, 5.8 rebounds and 3.0 assists.

=== 2022–present: Jalen Brunson era ===
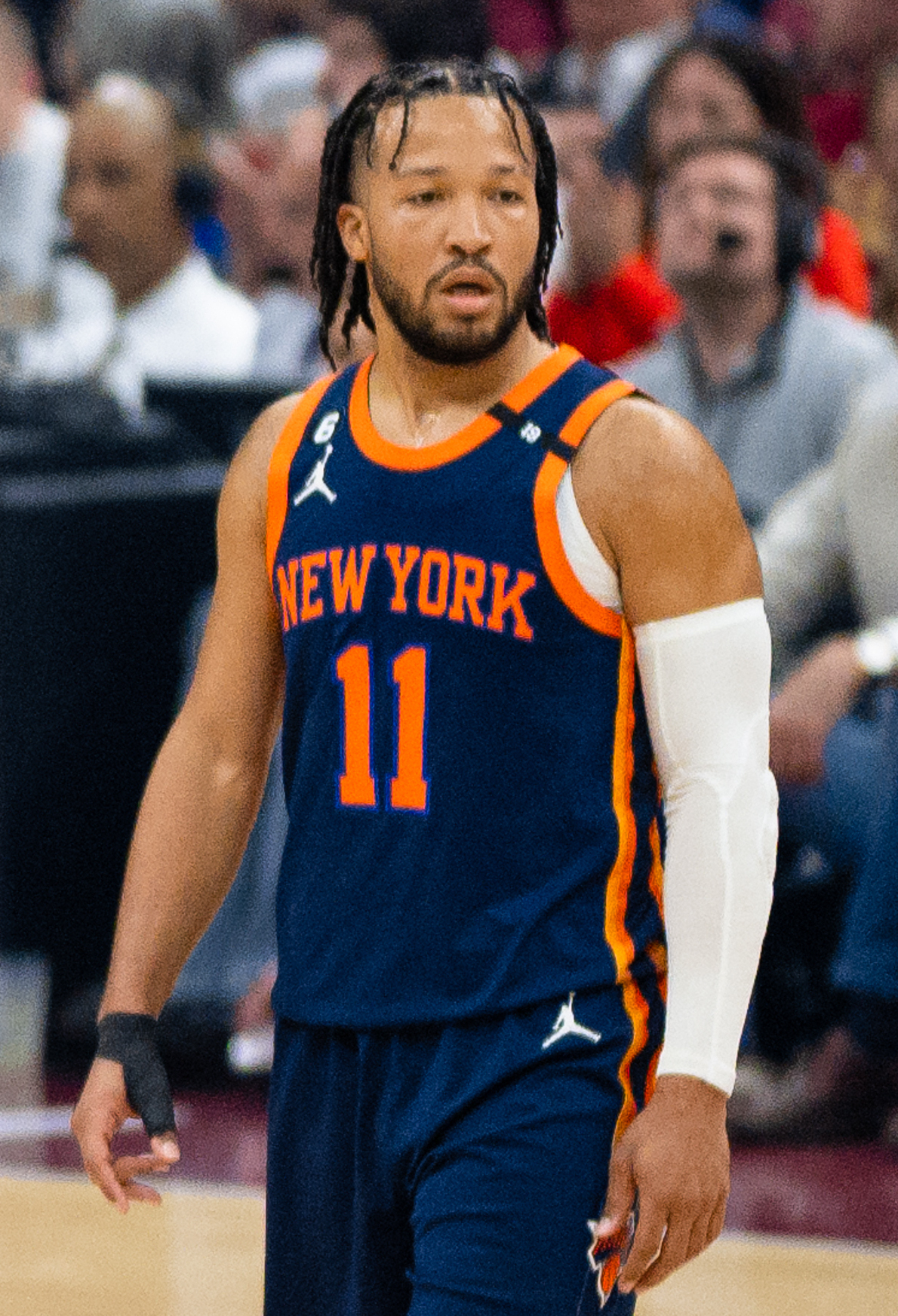
Jalen Brunson signed with the Knicks in 2022.

The 2022 off-season brought a lot of change to the Knicks' roster. During the 2022 NBA draft, the Knicks traded Alec Burks, Nerlens Noel and Kemba Walker to the Detroit Pistons to clear cap space for the free agency period, as well as trading their 11th overall pick for protected future first round picks. On June 12, 2022, the Knicks signed point guard Jalen Brunson to a four-year contract, with hopes he could bring some much-needed stability to the position. The Knicks completed the 2022–23 season with a 47–35 record, finishing in fifth place in the Eastern Conference. Randle represented the Knicks in the 2023 NBA All-Star Game. In the first round of the 2023 playoffs, the Knicks defeated the Cleveland Cavaliers in five games, their first playoff series win since 2013. They were then defeated 4–2 by the Miami Heat in the second round.

==== 2024–present: Randle's departure and arrival of Karl-Anthony Towns ====
In 2024, the Knicks saw Brunson and Randle represent them at the NBA All-Star Game. The team finished with 50 wins and secured the second seed, with a first round matchup against the Philadelphia 76ers. The Knicks defeated the 76ers in six games, before falling short in seven games against the Indiana Pacers. During the 2024 off-season, the Knicks traded away Julius Randle, Donte DiVincenzo and Keita Bates-Diop to the Minnesota Timberwolves in exchange for Karl-Anthony Towns.

In the 2025–26 season, the Knicks won the 2025 NBA Cup championship, after defeating the San Antonio Spurs in the championship game. Jalen Brunson was named the Cup MVP. In the 2026 playoffs, the Knicks defeated the Atlanta Hawks in six games in the first round and capped off with a blowout 140–89 victory on April 30. They would go on to sweep the Philadelphia 76ers in the Eastern Conference semifinals and the Cleveland Cavaliers in the Eastern Conference finals to advance to the NBA Finals against the San Antonio Spurs, mimicking their previous finals appearance in 1999. The Knicks would then go on to make NBA history and claim the NBA Championship in a 4-1 series ending the Knicks 53 year title drought.

== See also ==
- List of New York Knicks seasons
