= Clan Riddell =

Lowland Scottish clan

- Crest: A demi greyhound proper
- Motto: I hope to share

Profile
- District: Lowlands
- Plant badge: Rye

Chief
- Sir Walter John Buchanan Riddell of that Ilk, 14th Baronet
- Chief of Clan Riddell, The Riddell of that Ilk, Baronet Riddell of Riddell

Clan Riddell is a Scottish clan of the Scottish Lowlands.

== History ==
=== Origins of the Clan ===
One theory for the origin of the name Riddell is that the family were from Gascony and came to Scotland via Ryedale in Yorkshire. However, it is much more likely that the name is of Norman origin.

In 1116, Gervase Ridale was a witness to a charter of David I of Scotland. His son was Walter who received a charter for the lands of Lilliesleaf in Roxburghshire. William the Lion was taken prisoner at the Battle of Alnwick in 1174 and one of Gervase's nephews was sent as a hostage.

Swinburn in Northumberland was also acquired by the Riddells. In 1296 Sir William Riddell of Riddell appears on the Ragman Rolls swearing fealty to Edward I of England.

=== 17th century and Civil War ===
In 1628 Sir John Riddell was created a Baronet of Nova Scotia. His lands were then erected into a barony and regality of New Riddell. His third son was William Riddell who was knighted by Charles I of England and served in the wars in the Netherlands.

The Reverend Archibald Riddell, third son of the second baronet, was imprisoned because he would not renounce his Covenanter beliefs. A prominent seventeenth century merchant in Edinburgh, John Riddell, claimed descend from Galfridus de Reidel. John amassed great wealth from the trade across the Baltic Sea. During the Scottish Civil War his son, who acquired extensive lands near Linlithgow, is said to have intrigued with the forces of Oliver Cromwell and became a close friend of General Monck.

=== 18th to 21st century ===
The family later acquired extensive Argyll estates of Ardnamurchan and Sunart. In 1778 James Riddel, first Baronet of Ardnamurchan received his title. He was also a Fellow of the Society of Arts and Sciences and superintendent general to the Society of British Fishery.

Sir Rodney Riddell, fourth Baronet was a professional soldier who campaigned in New Zealand and Afghanistan during the Second Anglo-Afghan War.

== Clan Chief ==
The current chief is sir Walter John Buchanan Riddell 14th Baronet (b. 1974), son of the late Sir John Charles Buchanan Riddell who died in 2010.

== See also ==
- Scottish clan
