= Edward Adeane =

English public servant

The Honourable Edward Adeane CVO

Private Secretary to the Prince of Wales
- In office 1979–1985
- Preceded by: Sir David Checketts
- Succeeded by: Sir John Riddell

Personal details
- Born: George Edward Adeane; 4 October 1939
- Died: 20 May 2015 (aged 75)
- Domestic partner: Brent Snape
- Parent: Michael Adeane (father)
- Relatives: Arthur Bigge (great-grandfather); Edward S. Adeane (great-grandfather)
- Education: Eton College; Magdalene College, Cambridge (MA); Middle Temple

The Honourable George Edward Adeane CVO (4 October 1939 – 20 May 2015) was an English barrister and royal advisor who served as Private Secretary to the Prince of Wales from 1979 to 1985.

== Early years and education ==
Adeane was born in 1939, the son of Michael Adeane (created a life peer as Baron Adeane in 1972) and Helen Chetwynd-Stapylton, the daughter of Richard Chetwynd-Stapylton. The family had a long history of service to the royal family. His maternal great-grandfather was Arthur Bigge, later Lord Stamfordham, private secretary to Queen Victoria and King George V. His paternal great-grandfather was Admiral Edward Stanley Adeane. Adeane's father was Private Secretary to the Queen for 19 years, between 1953 and 1972.

He was educated at Eton College and Magdalene College, Cambridge, where he graduated with an MA. He was a Page of Honour to The Queen from 1954 to 1956.

== Career ==
In 1960 and 1961, he was a Plebiscite Supervisor in Southern Cameroon. He was called to the Bar at the Middle Temple in July 1962 and specialised in libel until 1979. As a barrister, he defended Time Out magazine, owned by Playboy Publications, Inc., in 1973, when they had accused Fiona Lewis, an actress, of being involved with South American revolutionaries. She was awarded damages.

The following year, he represented The Spectator magazine, which had libelled publisher Jonathan Cape, suggesting they were in financial difficulties, and won a similar outcome. In 1975, he more successfully represented Marcia, Lady Falkender, who was falsely accused of forging her boss's signature, former Prime Minister Harold Wilson. She was paid damages and costs. In 1977, Adeane represented Marlene Dietrich in a libel case brought by producer Alexander Cohen for breach of contract as a disreputable performer.

Adeane was appointed Private Secretary and Treasurer to the Prince of Wales in May 1979 to succeed David Checketts. Prince Charles and Edward Adeane shared a passion for angling on the River Test near Stockbridge, Hampshire. Adeane was a member of the Houghton Fishing Club, where he continued fishing until his last days. Adeane was made the Princess's Treasurer in 1981 on her marriage to the Prince of Wales. Adeane was granted the additional appointment as private secretary to the Princess of Wales in 1984 following Oliver Everett's resignation. The Daily Mirror reported the Princess of Wales calling Adeane a "fuddy-duddy."

When Adeane tried to plan a tour of Australia in 1984, he was accused of manipulating State elections in Victoria for political purposes. In attempting to distance the Premier, Adeane was quoted in the Daily Mirror and other newspapers.

Adeane resigned on 31 March 1985 after disagreements and accusations that he was making decisions without consulting the prince and had too much of the 'old school tie' about him. He was appointed Extra Equerry to the Prince of Wales in 1985 and appointed Commander of the Royal Victorian Order. He represented the Prince at Royal Household memorial services and returned to practice at the Bar. Sir John Riddell succeeded him.

== Personal life ==
Adeane was gay, and in a domestic partnership with Brent Snape.

== Offices held ==
Court offices
Preceded by Jonathan Peel	Page of Honour; 1954–1956	Succeeded by Duncan Davidson
Preceded by Sir David Checketts	Private Secretary to the Prince of Wales; 1979–1985	Succeeded by David Roycroft (acting)
