= David Roycroft =

British former diplomat (born 1947)

David Roycroft (born 1947) is a former British diplomat.

He served in the armed forces from 1968 to 1974, when he joined the Foreign and Commonwealth Office as a 2nd Secretary. In 1977 he was sent to Lisbon as 1st Secretary (Information), and in 1981 returned to London.

In July 1983, he was appointed Assistant Private Secretary to the Prince of Wales, and served until August 1986. He was attached to the Prince only in 1983–1984, and thereafter to the Prince and Princess jointly. He was also acting Private Secretary 1 April to September 1985, reportedly not establishing a rapport with the Prince.

In 1986, he became ITN's Administration Manager and Company Secretary. He is now Head of Corporate Affairs and Investor Relations, Pilkington Plc.

== Offices held ==
Court offices
| Preceded by Edward Adeane | Private Secretary to the Prince of Wales (Acting); 1985 (1 April–September) | Succeeded by Sir John Riddell |
