= Sir John Buchanan-Riddell, 11th Baronet =

British barrister and baronet

Sir John Walter Buchanan-Riddell, 11th Baronet (14 March 1849 – 31 October 1924) was a British barrister and baronet.

He was educated at Eton College and Christ Church, Oxford before being called to the bar (becoming a barrister) by Inner Temple in 1874.

He succeeded his uncle (Sir Walter Riddell, 10th Baronet) as 11th Baronet in the line of Riddell Baronets in 1892. In 1897, he served as High Sheriff of Northumberland. He was a member of the Council of Keble College, Oxford, from 1899 until his death.

He died on 31 October 1924, succeeded by his son, Sir Walter Robert Buchanan-Riddell, 12th Baronet, who was Principal of Hertford College, Oxford.

Baronetage of Nova Scotia
Preceded by Walter Buchanan Riddell	Baronet (of Riddell); 1892–1924	Succeeded by Walter Robert Buchanan-Riddell
