= Sir Walter Riddell, 12th Baronet =

British academic

Sir Walter Robert Buchanan-Riddell, 12th Baronet (21 April 1879 – 5 June 1934) was a British academic. He was educated at Eton College and Christ Church, Oxford. He was principal of Hertford College, Oxford, between 1922 and 1929.

In 1919 Riddell married Hon. Rachel Lyttelton, daughter of Charles Lyttelton, 8th Viscount Cobham, and they had eight children. He succeeded his father (Sir John Buchanan-Riddell, 11th Baronet) as 12th Baronet in the line of Riddell Baronets in 1924. He was appointed chairman of the University Grants Committee in 1930. He was a member of the Council of Keble College, Oxford, from 1923 until his death. He died on 5 June 1934, succeeded by his son, Sir John Riddell, 13th Baronet, who was then 5 months old.

Baronetage of Nova Scotia
Preceded by John Walter Buchanan-Riddell	Baronet (of Riddell); 1924–1934	Succeeded by John Charles Buchanan Riddell
Academic offices
Preceded by Henry Boyd	Principal of Hertford College, Oxford; 1922–1930	Succeeded by C. R. M. F. Cruttwell
