= David Checketts =

Royal Air Force officer (born 1930)

Squadron Leader Sir David John Checketts, KCVO (born 23 August 1930) was Private Secretary to the Prince of Wales from 1970 to 1979.

Checketts joined the Royal Air Force in 1948 and received flying training at RATG Bulawayo, Southern Rhodesia in 1948–1950.

Checketts served with 14 Squadron in Germany 1950–1954, and then was an instructor at the fighter weapons school 1954–1957. From 1958 to 1959 he was Aide-de-Camp to the Commander-in-Chief Malta. He returned to Germany 1960–1961 with 3 Squadron.

From 1961 to 1966 he was Equerry to the Duke of Edinburgh. Checketts and his wife were the guardians of the young Prince Charles in Australia whilst he attended Geelong Grammar School in 1966. Checketts is said to have commented that he "went out with a boy and came back with a man". On his return in 1967 he became Equerry to the Prince of Wales, and in 1970 was promoted to be his Private Secretary and Treasurer. He retired from both roles in 1979, and has been Extra Equerry since then. He remains the longest serving of the Prince of Wales Private Secretaries.

Checketts was later director of Phoenix Lloyd Ltd and Neilson McCarthy Company (a public relations firm) c.1970.

Checketts was appointed an MVO in 1966, and promoted to CVO in 1969, and KCVO in 1979.

Checketts' grandson Captain Stuart Kaye was appointed Equerry to The Princess Royal in 2022.

Court offices
Preceded by ?	Private Secretary to the Prince of Wales; 1970–1978	Succeeded by Edward Adeane
