= Michael Adeane, Baron Adeane =

Private Secretary to Elizabeth II

Lieutenant Colonel The Right Honourable The Lord Adeane GCB GCVO PC
- Adeane in 1953

Private Secretary to the Sovereign
- In office 1 January 1954 – 1 April 1972
- Monarch: Elizabeth II
- Preceded by: Sir Alan Lascelles
- Succeeded by: Sir Martin Charteris

Assistant Private Secretary to the Sovereign
- In office 1945–1953 Serving with Martin Charteris (from 1952)
- Monarchs: George VI; Elizabeth II
- Private Secretary: Sir Alan Lascelles

Member of the House of Lords
- Lord Temporal
- Life peerage 20 April 1972 – 30 April 1984

Personal details
- Born: Michael Edward Adeane; 30 September 1910 London, England
- Died: 30 April 1984 (aged 73) Aberdeen, Scotland
- Spouse: Helen Chetwynd-Stapleton (m. 1939)
- Children: 2, including Edward Adeane
- Education: Magdalene College, Cambridge

Michael Edward Adeane, Baron Adeane, GCB, GCVO, PC (30 September 1910 – 30 April 1984) was Private Secretary to Elizabeth II from 1953 to 1972.

== Early life and education ==
Adeane was the son of Captain Henry Robert Augustus Adeane (1882–1914), by his wife Hon. Victoria Eugenie Bigge (d.1969). His paternal grandfather was Admiral Edward Stanley Adeane, from a family of landed gentry tracing their ancestry to a Simon Adeane who died in 1686; his maternal grandfather was Arthur Bigge, 1st Baron Stamfordham, Private Secretary to Queen Victoria and King George V. Adeane was educated at Eton College and graduated from Magdalene College, Cambridge in 1934 with a Master of Arts degree.

== Career ==
After graduating, Adeane travelled to Canada. He was aide-de-camp to Lord Bessborough, Governor General of Canada from 1934 to 1935, and then to his successor, Lord Tweedsmuir, until 1936.

Adeane then returned to Britain and became George VI's Assistant Private Secretary from 1945 after five-and-a-half years on active military duty, a post he held until the king's death in 1952. He continued in that post for Queen Elizabeth until 1953 when he was promoted to Private Secretary and admitted to the Privy Council.

In 1961, during a Royal visit to Nepal, Adeane was credited with a share of a tiger kill with Sir Christopher Bonham-Carter in a royal tiger hunt. The tiger-shooting role had fallen to him after the Queen had declined, the Duke of Edinburgh had been unable to shoot due to having his trigger finger in a splint, and the then Foreign Secretary Alec Douglas-Home had missed twice.

== Personal life ==
On 10 January 1939 Adeane married Helen Chetwynd-Stapylton (1916 – 1994), and they had a daughter and a son. Their son, Edward Adeane, a barrister, was Private Secretary to the Prince of Wales from 1979 to 1984.

On 30 April 1984 Adeane died of heart failure in Aberdeen, Scotland. He was cremated at Golders Green Crematorium.

== Honours ==
Adeane was appointed a Member of the Royal Victorian Order (MVO) in 1946, and a Companion of the Order of the Bath (CB) in 1947; he was promoted to Knight Commander of the Royal Victorian Order (KCVO) in 1951, and Knight Commander of the Order of the Bath (KCB) in 1955. In 1962 he was promoted to Knight Grand Cross of the Royal Victorian Order (GCVO) and in 1968 to Knight Grand Cross of the Order of the Bath (GCB).

In 1959, Adeane received the Grand Decoration in Gold with Sash for Services to the Republic of Austria and on 20 April 1972, he was created a life peer as Baron Adeane, of Stamfordham in the County of Northumberland.

Court offices
Preceded by Henry Hunloke	Page of Honour; 1923–1927	Succeeded by Jock Colville
Preceded by Alan Lascelles	Private Secretary to the Sovereign; 1953–1972	Succeeded by Martin Charteris
