= Edward Stanley Adeane =

British Royal Navy Admiral (1836–1902)

Admiral Edward Stanley Adeane CMG
- Born: 7 December 1836
- Died: 18 October 1902 (aged 65); Sedlescombe, East Sussex
- Military career
- Allegiance: United Kingdom
- Branch: Royal Navy
- Service years: 1850–1901
- Rank: Admiral
- Commands: HMS Tenedos; HMS Ajax
- Awards: Companion of the Order of St Michael and St George

Admiral Edward Stanley Adeane, CMG (7 December 1836 – 18 October 1902) was a British Royal Navy admiral at the end of the 19th century.

== Background ==
Adeane was born in 1836, the younger son of politician and Member of Parliament Henry John Adeane, of Babraham, Cambridgeshire, by his wife Honourable Matilda Abigail Stanley, daughter of John Stanley, 1st Baron Stanley of Alderley. His elder brother Henry John Adeane (1833–1870) also served as a Member of Parliament. The Adeane family were landed gentry, tracing their ancestry to a Simon Adeane who died in 1686.

== Navy career ==
Adeane entered the Royal Navy in 1850, and was a midshipman on board HMS Imperieuse in the Baltic Sea during the Crimean War. He was promoted to lieutenant in 1858, commander in 1864, and to captain in 1871. He was in command of the screw sloop HMS Tenedos during the Anglo-Zulu War in 1879, for which he was appointed a Companion of the Order of St Michael and St George (CMG). In 1885 he was in command of the ironclad battleship HMS Ajax.

He was promoted to flag rank as a rear-admiral on 1 January 1888, and was Second in Command of the Channel Squadron for a year from September 1891 to September 1892. Promoted to the rank of vice-admiral on 13 May 1893, and to full admiral on 19 March 1898, he was placed on the Retired List at his own request on 7 December 1901.

In 1900 he was elected a member of the Westminster Borough Council. He was Chairman of the Shipwrecked Mariners' Society and a Member of the Metropolitan Asylums Board.

Adeane died at his residence Jacob's Farm, Sedlescombe, East Sussex, on 18 October 1902. He was buried at Babraham, Cambridgeshire.

== Family ==
Adeane married, in 1875, Lady Edith Dalzell (1843–1909), daughter of Harry Dalzell, 10th Earl of Carnwath. They had a son Captain Henry Robert Augustus Adeane (1882–1914), whose son was Michael Adeane, Baron Adeane.
