= Sir John Riddell, 13th Baronet =

Former Private Secretary to the Prince of Wales

Sir John Charles Buchanan Riddell, 13th Baronet, KCVO DL FRSA (3 January 1934 – 24 July 2010) was Private Secretary to the Prince of Wales from 1985 to 1990. He was Lord Lieutenant of Northumberland from 2000 to 2009.

== Early life ==
Riddell was born at Hepple, Northumberland. He succeeded to the Baronetcy of Riddell as an infant, on the death of his father, Sir Walter Robert Buchanan Riddell, 12th Baronet, in 1934. The family seat at Whitefield House, Hepple was bought by his ancestor Sir John Buchanan Riddell (1796–1822) from the Duke of Portland in 1804.

Riddell was educated at Eton College and Christ Church, Oxford, and served briefly as a Second Lieutenant in the King's Royal Rifle Corps (1952–54) before qualifying as a chartered accountant.

== Career ==
Riddell worked with the International Bank for Reconstruction and Development in Washington from 1969 to 1971. He was associate director of First Boston Corp from 1972 to 1975, and director of First Boston (Europe) Ltd from 1975 to 1978. From 1978 to 1985 he was director of CS First Boston, to which he returned as deputy chairman from 1990 to 1995.

Sir John held other directorships, including of the Northumbrian Water Group (1992–?) and the Northern Rock Building Society (1981–1985 and 2000–2004) (deputy chairman from 1992). He was trustee of The Frank Buttle Trust from 1981 to 1987, a member of the Bloomsbury District Health Authority from 1982 to 1985, and deputy chairman of the Independent Broadcasting Authority (IBA) from 1981 to 1985. He became an executive director of MC Securities Ltd in 1995.

He was appointed Private Secretary to the Prince and Princess of Wales in September 1985, and resigned on 31 May 1990. He was also Treasurer to the Prince and Princess of Wales from 1986 to 1990, and member of the Prince's Council from 1985 to 1989. He was an Extra Equerry from 1990 until his death.

Riddell was appointed Commander of the Royal Victorian Order (CVO) in 1990 on his retirement as Private Secretary. He was made a Knight of the Venerable Order of Saint John in 2002. He was appointed a Deputy Lieutenant of Northumberland in 1990 and became Lord Lieutenant in 2000, stepping down in 2009. He was also a Fellow of the Royal Society of Arts (FRSA) from 1990. He was promoted Knight Commander of the Royal Victorian Order (KCVO) in the 2009 New Year Honours.

== Personal life ==
In 1969 he married Sarah, daughter of Baron Richardson of Duntisbourne, who bore him three sons between 1974 and 1982, including:

- Sir Walter John Buchanan Riddell, 14th Baronet (born 1974)

Riddell died on 24 July 2010, at Rothbury Community Hospital, Northumberland, aged 76. His eldest son Walter John Buchanan Riddell inherited the baronetcy.

Court offices
Preceded by David Roycroft	Private Secretary to the Prince of Wales; 1985–1990	Succeeded by Sir Christopher Airy
Honorary titles
Preceded by The Viscount Ridley	Lord Lieutenant of Northumberland; 2000–2009	Succeeded by The Duchess of Northumberland
Baronetage of Nova Scotia
Preceded by Walter Buchanan Riddell	Baronet (of Riddell); 1934–2010	Succeeded by Walter John Buchanan Riddell
