= Riddell baronets =

Set index for Riddell baronets

There have been three baronetcies created for people with the surname Riddell, one in the Baronetage of Nova Scotia, one in the Baronetage of Great Britain and one in the Baronetage of the United Kingdom. As of 2026 one creation is extant.

- Riddell baronets of Riddell (1628)
- Riddell baronets of Ardnamurchan (1778)
- Riddell baronets of Walton Heath (1918): see George Riddell, 1st Baron Riddell (1865–1934)
