= List of 1946–47 BAA season transactions =

This is a list of personnel changes from the 1946–47 BAA season.

== Trades ==
December
December 4	To Cleveland Rebels: George Nostrand	To Toronto Huskies: Kleggie Hermsen
December 12	To Boston Celtics: Moe Becker	To Pittsburgh Ironmen: Tony Kappen
December 16	To Cleveland Rebels: Ed Sadowski; Ray Wertis	To Toronto Huskies: Leo Mogus; Dick Schulz; Cash
January
January 2	To Boston Celtics: Charlie Hoefer	To Toronto Huskies: Red Wallace
January 21	To New York Knicks: Bob Fitzgerald	To Toronto Huskies: Bob Mullens
April
April 29	To Boston Celtics: Cecil Hankins	To St. Louis Bombers: Wyndol Gray

== Selling ==
Player	Date sold	Former team	New team
Jake Weber	December 2	Providence Steam Rollers	New York Knicks
Ralph Kaplowitz	January 16	Philadelphia Warriors	New York Knicks
Hank Rosenstein	January 26	Providence Steam Rollers	New York Knicks
Nat Militzok	February	Toronto Huskies	New York Knicks
