= Ray Wertis =

American basketball player

Personal information
- Born: January 1, 1922; Queens, New York, U.S.
- Died: January 19, 2006 (aged 84); Hollywood, Florida, U.S.
- Listed height: 5 ft 11 in (1.80 m)

Career information
- High school: Far Rockaway (Queens, New York)
- College: St. John's (1943–1946)
- Playing career: 1946–1948
- Position: Guard
- Number: 18, 14, 8

Career history
- 1946: Toronto Huskies
- 1946–1947: Cleveland Rebels
- 1947–1948: Providence Steamrollers
- Stats at NBA.com
- Stats at Basketball Reference

Raymond Anthony Wertis (January 1, 1922 – January 19, 2006) was a professional basketball player. He played for the Cleveland Rebels, Toronto Huskies, and Providence Steamrollers of the Basketball Association of America (now known as the National Basketball Association).

== College career ==
Ray played college basketball at St. John's University.

== Professional career ==
In the 1946–47 BAA season, Ray played for the Cleveland Rebels and Toronto Huskies. On November 1, 1946, Ray played in the first game in BAA league history in Toronto against the New York Knicks and then on December 16, 1947, Ray was traded by the Huskies with Ed Sadowski to the Cleveland Rebels for Leo Mogus, Dick Schulz, and cash.

In the 1947–48 BAA season, Ray played for the Providence Steamrollers.

In the 1948–1949 season, Ray played with the Saratoga Indians of the New York State Professional League.

== BAA career statistics ==
Legend
GP	Games played	FG%	Field-goal percentage
FT%	Free-throw percentage	APG	Assists per game
PPG	Points per game	**Bold**	Career high

=== Regular season ===
Year	Team	GP	FG%	FT%	APG	PPG
1946–47	Toronto	18	**.222**	**.622**	**1.0**	**5.5**
1946–47	Cleveland	**43**	.210	.611	.5	2.7
1947–48	Providence	7	.181	.429	.9	4.6
Career		68	.210	.590	.7	3.6

=== Playoffs ===
Year	Team	GP	FG%	FT%	APG	PPG
1946–47	Cleveland	3	.231	.800	2.0	5.3
Career		3	.231	.800	2.0	5.3
