= Pete Lalich =

American basketball player (1920–2008)

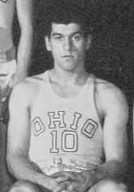

Personal information
- Born: June 23, 1920 Lorain, Ohio
- Died: February 1, 2008 (aged 87) St. Petersburg, Florida
- Listed height: 6 ft 2 in (1.88 m)
- Listed weight: 190 lb (86 kg)

Career information
- High school: East Technical (Cleveland, Ohio)
- College: Ohio (1939–1942)
- Playing career: 1942–1946
- Position: Forward / center

Career history
- 1942–1943: Sheboygan Red Skins
- 1943–1944: Cleveland Chase Brassmen
- 1944–1945: Pittsburgh Raiders
- 1945–1946: Youngstown Bears
- 1946: Cleveland Rebels
- Stats at NBA.com
- Stats at Basketball Reference

Peter Todd Lalich (June 23, 1920 – February 1, 2008) was an American professional basketball player. He played for the Cleveland Rebels of the Basketball Association of America (now known as the National Basketball Association).

== High school career ==
Lalich played basketball for East Technical High School in Cleveland, Ohio, where he captained a championship team in 1938.

== College career ==
A multi-sport athlete, Lalich played basketball and baseball at Ohio University. Playing the center position, he was a four-year starter for the basketball team. In 1987 he was inducted into the Ohio University Athletics Hall of Fame.

== Professional career ==
Lalich played professionally in the National Basketball League with the Sheboygan Redskins, the Cleveland Chase Brassmen, the Pittsburgh Raiders and the Youngstown Bears. In 1946, Lalich joined the Cleveland Rebels. He appeared in one game for the team in the Basketball Association of America where he attempted one field goal and was credited with one personal foul.

== Later life ==
Following his basketball career, Lalich worked for 35 years for Western & Southern Life Insurance Company, retiring in 1980 as divisional vice-president of sales.

== Personal ==
He was the son of Serbian immigrants and his older brother, Nick Lalich, was also a professional basketball player for the 1945–46 Youngstown Bears in the NBL and was the leader of the OSS team that rescued about 550 downed air crews during World War II Operation Halyard, without losing a single life or a single plane.

== BAA career statistics ==
Legend
GP	Games played
FG%	Field-goal percentage
FT%	Free-throw percentage
APG	Assists per game
PPG	Points per game

=== Regular season ===
Year	Team	GP	FG%	FT%	APG	PPG
1946–47	Cleveland	1	.000	.000	.0	.0
Career		1	.000	.000	.0	.0
