= Ken Corley =

American basketball player (1920–1984)

Personal information
- Born: May 10, 1920 McLoud, Oklahoma, U.S.
- Died: June 27, 1984 (aged 64) Aurora, Colorado, U.S.
- Listed height: 6 ft 5 in (1.96 m)
- Listed weight: 210 lb (95 kg)

Career information
- College: Central Oklahoma (1939–1943)
- Position: Center

Career history
- 1945–1947: Wilmington Bombers
- 1946–1947: Cleveland Rebels
- Stats at NBA.com
- Stats at Basketball Reference

Albert Kenneth Corley (May 10, 1920 – June 27, 1984) was an American professional basketball player. He played for the Cleveland Rebels of the Basketball Association of America (now known as the National Basketball Association). Many encyclopedias state he is the brother of former NBA player Ray Corley, but Ray was born and raised near New York City whereas Ken grew up in Eldorado, Oklahoma.

== Early life and education ==
Ken played college basketball and football at University of Central Oklahoma (then known as Central State College). During World War II, Corley served in the navy achieving the rank of chief specialist. He served at United States Naval Training Center Bainbridge and Philadelphia Naval Shipyard.

== Professional career ==
After serving in the U.S. Navy, Ken played two seasons for the Wilmington Bombers in the American Basketball League. He also played in three games for the Cleveland Rebels. Corley also briefly played minor league baseball.

== BAA career statistics ==
Legend
GP	Games played
FG%	Field-goal percentage
FT%	Free-throw percentage
APG	Assists per game
PPG	Points per game

=== Regular season ===
Year	Team	GP	FG%	FT%	APG	PPG
1946–47	Cleveland	3	.000	.000	.0	.0
Career		3	.000	.000	.0	.0
