= List of NBA seasons =

The National Basketball Association (NBA) is the major professional basketball league in North America. The league was founded in 1946 as the Basketball Association of America (BAA). The league adopted its current name at the start of 1949–50 season when it merged with the National Basketball League (NBL). The league currently consists of thirty teams, of which twenty-nine are located in the United States and one in Canada. Each team plays 82 games in the regular season. Eight teams from each of the league's two conferences qualify for the playoffs. The winners of the Conference finals advance to the finals to determine the NBA champions.

The Boston Celtics have had or tied for the best regular season record a record 19 times. They won the Eastern Conference 11 times, while the Los Angeles Lakers won the Western Conference 19 times. The Celtics have won 18 NBA championships, the most in NBA history. The Lakers also have a record 32 Finals appearances. The Celtics and the Lakers had played each other in the Finals for a record 12 times. The Celtics won 9 of their matchups while the Lakers have only won 3.

The best single regular season record was recorded by the Golden State Warriors in the 2015–16 season. In that season, the Warriors recorded 73 wins and 9 losses with a winning percentage of .890, surpassing the 72-win 1995–96 Chicago Bulls, though the Bulls went on to win the Eastern Conference and the NBA championship. The 1996 Bulls and the 2016 Warriors are the only teams to win at least 70 games in a single season.

The Eastern champions have won 41 championships while the Western champions have won 37 championships. The defunct Central Division won one championship in 1950. Of the 78 championships, 35 of them were won by the teams who had or tied for the best regular season record. In 10 other occurrences, the teams who had or tied for the best regular season record, lost the Finals. Six teams that had the best regular season record and won the championships in the same season, were named to the list of Top 10 Teams in NBA History announced at the league's 50th anniversary in 1996. The Celtics, the Bulls, the Lakers and the Philadelphia 76ers each had two teams selected, while the Detroit Pistons and the New York Knicks each had one team selected.

== List ==
Year^{[a]}	Top seed	Record	Year^{[b]}	Eastern champion	Western champion	Year^{[c]}	Champion	No. of teams^{[d]}	No. of games^{[e]}	Notes^{[f]}	Ref.
Regular season			Playoffs			Finals		No. of teams^{[d]}	No. of games^{[e]}	Notes^{[f]}	Ref.
1946–47	Washington Capitols	49–11 (.817)	1947	—^{[g]}	—^{[g]}	1947	Philadelphia Warriors	11	60–61	Inaugural season (as BAA); started with 11 teams	
1947–48	St. Louis Bombers	29–19 (.604)	1948	—^{[g]}	—^{[g]}	1948	Baltimore Bullets^{[h]}	8	48	4 teams folded prior to the season; 1 ABL team joined	
1948–49	Rochester Royals	45–15 (.750)	1949	—^{[g]}	—^{[g]}	1949	Minneapolis Lakers	12	60	4 NBL teams joined	
1949–50	Syracuse Nationals	51–13 (.797)	1950	—^{[g]}	—^{[g]}	1950	Minneapolis Lakers^{[j]}	17	62–68	BAA merged with NBL and was renamed NBA; 2 teams folded prior to the season; 6 NBL teams joined; 1 expansion team joined	
1950–51	Minneapolis Lakers	44–24 (.647)	1951	—^{[g]}	—^{[g]}	1951	Rochester Royals	11	66–69	3 teams left the NBA for the NPBL; 3 teams folded prior to the season; 1 team folded during the season; the first All-Star Game was held	
1951–52	Rochester Royals	41–25 (.621)	1952	—^{[g]}	—^{[g]}	1952	Minneapolis Lakers	10	66		
1952–53	Minneapolis Lakers	48–22 (.686)	1953	—^{[g]}	—^{[g]}	1953	Minneapolis Lakers	10	69–71		
1953–54	Minneapolis Lakers	46–26 (.639)	1954	—^{[g]}	—^{[g]}	1954	Minneapolis Lakers	9	72	1 team folded prior to the season	
1954–55	Syracuse Nationals; Fort Wayne Pistons^{[k]}	43–29 (.597)	1955	—^{[g]}	—^{[g]}	1955	Syracuse Nationals	9	72	1 team folded during the season	
1955–56	Philadelphia Warriors	45–27 (.625)	1956	—^{[g]}	—^{[g]}	1956	Philadelphia Warriors	8	72		
1956–57	Boston Celtics	44–28 (.611)	1957	—^{[g]}	—^{[g]}	1957	Boston Celtics	8	72		
1957–58	Boston Celtics	49–23 (.681)	1958	—^{[g]}	—^{[g]}	1958	St. Louis Hawks	8	72		
1958–59	Boston Celtics	52–20 (.722)	1959	—^{[g]}	—^{[g]}	1959	Boston Celtics	8	72		
1959–60	Boston Celtics	59–16 (.787)	1960	—^{[g]}	—^{[g]}	1960	Boston Celtics	8	75		
1960–61	Boston Celtics	57–22 (.722)	1961	—^{[g]}	—^{[g]}	1961	Boston Celtics	8	79		
1961–62	Boston Celtics	60–20 (.750)	1962	—^{[g]}	—^{[g]}	1962	Boston Celtics	9	80	1 expansion team joined	
1962–63	Boston Celtics	58–22 (.725)	1963	—^{[g]}	—^{[g]}	1963	Boston Celtics	9	80		
1963–64	Boston Celtics	59–21 (.738)	1964	—^{[g]}	—^{[g]}	1964	Boston Celtics	9	80		
1964–65	Boston Celtics	62–18 (.775)	1965	—^{[g]}	—^{[g]}	1965	Boston Celtics	9	80	Named as one of the Top 10 Teams in NBA History	
1965–66	Philadelphia 76ers	55–25 (.688)	1966	—^{[g]}	—^{[g]}	1966	Boston Celtics	9	80		
1966–67	Philadelphia 76ers	68–13 (.840)	1967	—^{[g]}	—^{[g]}	1967	Philadelphia 76ers	10	81	1 expansion team joined; named as one of the Top 10 Teams in NBA History	
1967–68	Philadelphia 76ers	62–20 (.756)	1968	—^{[g]}	—^{[g]}	1968	Boston Celtics	12	82	2 expansion teams joined	
1968–69	Baltimore Bullets	57–25 (.695)	1969	—^{[g]}	—^{[g]}	1969	Boston Celtics	14	82	2 expansion teams joined	
1969–70	New York Knicks	60–22 (.732)	1970	—^{[g]}	—^{[g]}	1970	New York Knicks	14	82	Named as one of the Top 10 Teams in NBA History	
1970–71	Milwaukee Bucks	66–16 (.805)	1971	Baltimore Bullets	Milwaukee Bucks	1971	Milwaukee Bucks	17	82	3 expansion teams joined; 25th anniversary season	
1971–72	Los Angeles Lakers	69–13 (.841)	1972	New York Knicks	Los Angeles Lakers	1972	Los Angeles Lakers	17	82	Named as one of the Top 10 Teams in NBA History	
1972–73	Boston Celtics	68–14 (.829)	1973	New York Knicks	Los Angeles Lakers	1973	New York Knicks	17	82		
1973–74	Milwaukee Bucks	59–23 (.720)	1974	Boston Celtics	Milwaukee Bucks	1974	Boston Celtics	17	82		
1974–75	Boston Celtics^{[l]}	60–22 (.732)	1975	Washington Bullets	Golden State Warriors	1975	Golden State Warriors	18	82	1 expansion team joined	
1975–76	Golden State Warriors	59–23 (.720)	1976	Boston Celtics	Phoenix Suns	1976	Boston Celtics	18	82		
1976–77	Los Angeles Lakers	53–29 (.646)	1977	Philadelphia 76ers	Portland Trail Blazers	1977	Portland Trail Blazers	22	82	ABA merged with NBA; 4 ABA teams joined	
1977–78	Portland Trail Blazers	58–24 (.707)	1978	Washington Bullets	Seattle SuperSonics	1978	Washington Bullets	22	82		
1978–79	Washington Bullets	54–28 (.659)	1979	Washington Bullets	Seattle SuperSonics	1979	Seattle SuperSonics	22	82		
1979–80	Boston Celtics	61–21 (.744)	1980	Philadelphia 76ers	Los Angeles Lakers	1980	Los Angeles Lakers	22	82		
1980–81	Boston Celtics^{[m]}	62–20 (.756)	1981	Boston Celtics	Houston Rockets	1981	Boston Celtics	23	82	1 expansion team joined; 35th Anniversary season	
1981–82	Boston Celtics	63–19 (.768)	1982	Philadelphia 76ers	Los Angeles Lakers	1982	Los Angeles Lakers	23	82		
1982–83	Philadelphia 76ers	65–17 (.793)	1983	Philadelphia 76ers	Los Angeles Lakers	1983	Philadelphia 76ers	23	82	Named as one of the Top 10 Teams in NBA History	
1983–84	Boston Celtics	62–20 (.756)	1984	Boston Celtics	Los Angeles Lakers	1984	Boston Celtics	23	82		
1984–85	Boston Celtics	63–19 (.768)	1985	Boston Celtics	Los Angeles Lakers	1985	Los Angeles Lakers	23	82		
1985–86	Boston Celtics	67–15 (.817)	1986	Boston Celtics	Houston Rockets	1986	Boston Celtics	23	82	Named as one of the Top 10 Teams in NBA History	
1986–87	Los Angeles Lakers	65–17 (.793)	1987	Boston Celtics	Los Angeles Lakers	1987	Los Angeles Lakers	23	82	Named as one of the Top 10 Teams in NBA History	
1987–88	Los Angeles Lakers	62–20 (.756)	1988	Detroit Pistons	Los Angeles Lakers	1988	Los Angeles Lakers	23	82		
1988–89	Detroit Pistons	63–19 (.768)	1989	Detroit Pistons	Los Angeles Lakers	1989	Detroit Pistons	25	82	2 expansion teams joined; named as one of the Top 10 Teams in NBA History	
1989–90	Los Angeles Lakers	63–19 (.768)	1990	Detroit Pistons	Portland Trail Blazers	1990	Detroit Pistons	27	82	2 expansion teams joined	
1990–91	Portland Trail Blazers	63–19 (.768)	1991	Chicago Bulls	Los Angeles Lakers	1991	Chicago Bulls	27	82		
1991–92	Chicago Bulls	67–15 (.817)	1992	Chicago Bulls	Portland Trail Blazers	1992	Chicago Bulls	27	82	Named as one of the Top 10 Teams in NBA History	
1992–93	Phoenix Suns	62–20 (.756)	1993	Chicago Bulls	Phoenix Suns	1993	Chicago Bulls	27	82		
1993–94	Seattle SuperSonics	63–19 (.768)	1994	New York Knicks	Houston Rockets	1994	Houston Rockets	27	82		
1994–95	San Antonio Spurs	62–20 (.756)	1995	Orlando Magic	Houston Rockets	1995	Houston Rockets	27	82		
1995–96	Chicago Bulls	72–10 (.878)	1996	Chicago Bulls	Seattle SuperSonics	1996	Chicago Bulls	29	82	2 expansion teams joined; 50th anniversary season; Named as one of the Top 10 Teams in NBA History	
1996–97	Chicago Bulls	69–13 (.841)	1997	Chicago Bulls	Utah Jazz	1997	Chicago Bulls	29	82		
1997–98	Utah Jazz^{[n]}	62–20 (.756)	1998	Chicago Bulls	Utah Jazz	1998	Chicago Bulls	29	82		
1998–99	San Antonio Spurs^{[o]}	37–13 (.740)	1999	New York Knicks	San Antonio Spurs	1999	San Antonio Spurs	29	50	Season delayed and shortened due to a lockout	
1999–00	Los Angeles Lakers	67–15 (.817)	2000	Indiana Pacers	Los Angeles Lakers	2000	Los Angeles Lakers	29	82		
2000–01	San Antonio Spurs	58–24 (.707)	2001	Philadelphia 76ers	Los Angeles Lakers	2001	Los Angeles Lakers	29	82		
2001–02	Sacramento Kings	61–21 (.744)	2002	New Jersey Nets	Los Angeles Lakers	2002	Los Angeles Lakers	29	82		
2002–03	San Antonio Spurs^{[p]}	60–22 (.732)	2003	New Jersey Nets	San Antonio Spurs	2003	San Antonio Spurs	29	82		
2003–04	Indiana Pacers	61–21 (.744)	2004	Detroit Pistons	Los Angeles Lakers	2004	Detroit Pistons	29	82		
2004–05	Phoenix Suns	62–20 (.756)	2005	Detroit Pistons	San Antonio Spurs	2005	San Antonio Spurs	30	82	1 expansion team joined	
2005–06	Detroit Pistons	64–18 (.780)	2006	Miami Heat	Dallas Mavericks	2006	Miami Heat	30	82		
2006–07	Dallas Mavericks	67–15 (.817)	2007	Cleveland Cavaliers	San Antonio Spurs	2007	San Antonio Spurs	30	82		
2007–08	Boston Celtics	66–16 (.805)	2008	Boston Celtics	Los Angeles Lakers	2008	Boston Celtics	30	82		
2008–09	Cleveland Cavaliers	66–16 (.805)	2009	Orlando Magic	Los Angeles Lakers	2009	Los Angeles Lakers	30	82		
2009–10	Cleveland Cavaliers	61–21 (.744)	2010	Boston Celtics	Los Angeles Lakers	2010	Los Angeles Lakers	30	82		
2010–11	Chicago Bulls	62–20 (.756)	2011	Miami Heat	Dallas Mavericks	2011	Dallas Mavericks	30	82		
2011–12	Chicago Bulls^{[q]}	50–16 (.758)	2012	Miami Heat	Oklahoma City Thunder	2012	Miami Heat	30	66	Season delayed and shortened due to a lockout	
2012–13	Miami Heat	66–16 (.805)	2013	Miami Heat	San Antonio Spurs	2013	Miami Heat	30	81–82	Celtics and Pacers played 81 games due to the cancellation of a scheduled April 16, 2013 game (following the Boston Marathon bombing)	
2013–14	San Antonio Spurs	62–20 (.756)	2014	Miami Heat	San Antonio Spurs	2014	San Antonio Spurs	30	82		
2014–15	Golden State Warriors	67–15 (.817)	2015	Cleveland Cavaliers	Golden State Warriors	2015	Golden State Warriors	30	82	Hornets and Pelicans traded history	
2015–16	Golden State Warriors	73–9 (.890)	2016	Cleveland Cavaliers	Golden State Warriors	2016	Cleveland Cavaliers	30	82		
2016–17	Golden State Warriors	67–15 (.817)	2017	Cleveland Cavaliers	Golden State Warriors	2017	Golden State Warriors	30	82		
2017–18	Houston Rockets	65–17 (.793)	2018	Cleveland Cavaliers	Golden State Warriors	2018	Golden State Warriors	30	82		
2018–19	Milwaukee Bucks	60–22 (.732)	2019	Toronto Raptors	Golden State Warriors	2019	Toronto Raptors	30	82	Last 82-game season until 2021–22	
2019–20	Milwaukee Bucks	56–17 (.767)	2020	Miami Heat	Los Angeles Lakers	2020	Los Angeles Lakers	30	64–75	Season suspended and shortened due to COVID-19 pandemic	
2020–21	Utah Jazz	52–20 (.722)	2021	Milwaukee Bucks	Phoenix Suns	2021	Milwaukee Bucks	30	72	Season delayed and shortened due to COVID-19 pandemic	
2021–22	Phoenix Suns	64–18 (.780)	2022	Boston Celtics	Golden State Warriors	2022	Golden State Warriors	30	82	75th anniversary season Season returned to a normal 82-game slate from October to April	
2022–23	Milwaukee Bucks	58–24 (.707)	2023	Miami Heat	Denver Nuggets	2023	Denver Nuggets	30	82		
2023–24	Boston Celtics	64–18 (.780)	2024	Boston Celtics	Dallas Mavericks	2024	Boston Celtics	30	82		
2024–25	Oklahoma City Thunder	68–14 (.829)	2025	Indiana Pacers	Oklahoma City Thunder	2025	Oklahoma City Thunder	30	82		
2025–26	Oklahoma City Thunder	64–18 (.780)	2026	New York Knicks	San Antonio Spurs	2026	New York Knicks	30	82		
Regular season			Playoffs			Finals		No. of teams^{[d]}	No. of games^{[e]}	Notes^{[f]}	Ref.
Year^{[a]}	Top seed	Record	Year^{[b]}	Eastern champion	Western champion	Year^{[c]}	Champion	No. of teams^{[d]}	No. of games^{[e]}	Notes^{[f]}	Ref.

== Notes ==
- ^{a} Each year is linked to an article about that particular BAA/NBA season.
- ^{b} Each year is linked to an article about the BAA/NBA playoffs in that year.
- ^{c} Each year is linked to an article about the BAA/NBA Finals in that year.
- ^{d} Number of teams that participated in that particular season, including any teams that folded during the season.
- ^{e} Number of regular season games played by each team.
- ^{f} All team additions and subtractions occurred before the start of the season unless stated otherwise.
- ^{g} Prior to 1971, there were no Eastern and Western champions, because the BAA Semifinals/Division finals were meant to determine the BAA/NBA finalists, while division titles were always a regular season achievement.
- ^{h} The original Baltimore Bullets, who folded in 1954, are not affiliated with the present-day Washington Wizards, who were known as the Baltimore/Capital/Washington Bullets from 1963 to 1997.
- ^{i} The Anderson Packers, who folded in 1950, are not affiliated with the present-day Washington Wizards, who were known as the Chicago Packers during the 1961–62 season.
- ^{j} Due to the NBA's realignment into three divisions, the division champion with the best regular season record qualified automatically for the NBA Finals while the other two division champions faced off in the NBA semifinals to determine the other finalist. Eastern Division champion Syracuse had the best regular season record among the division champions, causing Central Division (no relation to the current Central Division) champion Minneapolis Lakers to face Western Division champion Anderson Packers in the NBA semifinals. The Lakers defeated the Packers to go to the Finals.
- ^{k} There was no tiebreaker. Two teams with the best record received a first-round bye in the playoffs.
- ^{l} Despite having the same record as the Washington Bullets, the Boston Celtics clinched top seed by winning the tiebreaker.
- ^{m} Despite having the same record as the Philadelphia 76ers, the Boston Celtics clinched top seed by winning the tiebreaker.
- ^{n} Despite having the same record as the Chicago Bulls, the Utah Jazz clinched top seed by virtue of winning their regular season series 2–0.
- ^{o} Despite having the same record as the Utah Jazz, the San Antonio Spurs clinched top seed by virtue of winning their regular season series 2–1.
- ^{p} Despite having the same record as the Dallas Mavericks, the San Antonio Spurs clinched top seed by virtue of having a better conference record (36–16 vs. Dallas's 34–18). The teams split their regular season series 2–2.
- ^{q} Despite having the same record as the San Antonio Spurs, the Chicago Bulls clinched top seed by virtue of their only regular season meeting between them, a 96–89 victory by the Bulls on February 29, 2012.

== See also ==
- List of NBA regular season team records
- Timeline of the NBA
