= Hank Lefkowitz =

American basketball player (1923–2007)

Personal information
- Born: August 31, 1923 Cleveland, Ohio, U.S.
- Died: April 21, 2007 (aged 83)
- Listed height: 6 ft 2 in (1.88 m)
- Listed weight: 190 lb (86 kg)

Career information
- High school: Cleveland Heights (Cleveland Heights, Ohio)
- College: Case Western Reserve
- Playing career: 1946–1947
- Position: Forward
- Number: 6

Career history
- 1946–1947: Cleveland Rebels
- Stats at NBA.com
- Stats at Basketball Reference

Henry A. Lefkowitz (August 31, 1923 – April 21, 2007) was a professional basketball player. He played for the Cleveland Rebels of the Basketball Association of America (now known as the National Basketball Association).

== High school career ==
Hank played high school basketball for Cleveland Heights High School, where he led the 1941 team to a Lake Erie League championship and earned All Lake Erie League honors.

== College career ==
Hank played college basketball at Western Reserve University (now known as Case Western Reserve University) where he was twice named co-captain and was named to the first All-Mid-American Conference team in 1946.

== Professional career ==
Hank played in 24 games for the Cleveland Rebels during the 1946–47 BAA season.

== BAA career statistics ==
Legend
GP	Games played
FG%	Field-goal percentage
FT%	Free-throw percentage
APG	Assists per game
PPG	Points per game

=== Regular season ===
Year	Team	GP	FG%	FT%	APG	PPG
1946–47	Cleveland	24	.193	.538	.2	2.1
Career		24	.193	.538	.2	2.1

=== Playoffs ===
Year	Team	GP	FG%	FT%	APG	PPG
1946–47	Cleveland	2	.222	1.000	.0	4.5
Career		2	.222	1.000	.0	4.5
