= Nick Shaback =

American basketball player (1918–2010)

Personal information
- Born: September 10, 1918 Bronx, New York, U.S.
- Died: January 5, 2010 (aged 91)
- Listed height: 5 ft 11 in (1.80 m)
- Listed weight: 180 lb (82 kg)

Career information
- High school: James Monroe (Bronx, New York)
- Playing career: 1939–1949
- Position: Guard
- Number: 9

Career history
- 1939–1940: Troy Celtics
- 1940: Wilkes-Barre Barons
- 1940–1941: Brooklyn Celtics
- 1941–1942: Wilmington Blue Bombers
- 1942–1943: Brooklyn Indians
- 1945–1946: Paterson Crescents
- 1946–1947: Cleveland Rebels
- Stats at NBA.com
- Stats at Basketball Reference

Nicholas Shaback (September 10, 1918 – January 5, 2010) was an American professional basketball player. He played for the Cleveland Rebels in the Basketball Association of America during the 1946–47 season. He was a 5-foot-11-inch (1.80 m), 180 pounds (82 kg) guard. He attended James Monroe High School in The Bronx, New York.

== BAA career statistics ==
Legend
GP	Games played
FG%	Field-goal percentage
FT%	Free-throw percentage
APG	Assists per game
PPG	Points per game

=== Regular season ===
Year	Team	GP	FG%	FT%	APG	PPG
1946–47	Cleveland	53	.265	.717	.5	4.6
Career		53	.265	.717	.5	4.6

=== Playoffs ===
Year	Team	GP	FG%	FT%	APG	PPG
1946–47	Cleveland	3	.273	.600	.0	5.0
Career		3	.273	.600	.0	5.0
