= Ben Scharnus =

American basketball player

Personal information
- Born: December 11, 1917 Newark, New Jersey, U.S.
- Died: March 19, 1982 (aged 64) Annapolis, Maryland, U.S.
- Listed height: 6 ft 2 in (1.88 m)
- Listed weight: 173 lb (78 kg)

Career information
- College: Seton Hall (1939–1942)
- Playing career: 1943–1949
- Position: Forward
- Number: 8, 15

Career history
- 1943–1944: Brooklyn Indians
- 1944: Wilmington Bombers
- 1944–1945: Baltimore Bullets
- 1945–1946: New York Gothams
- 1946–1947: Cleveland Rebels
- 1947–1948: Brooklyn Gothams
- 1948: Providence Steamrollers
- 1948–1949: Cohoes Mastadons
- Stats at NBA.com
- Stats at Basketball Reference

Benedict Michael Scharnus (December 11, 1917 - March 19, 1982) was a professional basketball player. He played for the Cleveland Rebels and the Providence Steamrollers of the Basketball Association of America (now known as the National Basketball Association).

== College career ==
Ben played college basketball at Seton Hall University

== Professional career ==
Ben played in 51 games for the Cleveland Rebels in the 1946–47 BAA season and one game for the Providence Steamrollers 1948–49 BAA season. In 1947, Ben was drafted by the Boston Celtics in a dispersal draft.

== BAA career statistics ==
Legend
GP	Games played	FG%	Field-goal percentage
FT%	Free-throw percentage	APG	Assists per game
PPG	Points per game	**Bold**	Career high

=== Regular season ===
Year	Team	GP	FG%	FT%	APG	PPG
1946–47	Cleveland	**51**	**.200**	**.627**	**.4**	**2.0**
1948–49	Providence	1	.000	.000	.0	.0
Career		52	.199	.617	.4	2.0

=== Playoffs ===
Year	Team	GP	FG%	FT%	APG	PPG
1947	Cleveland	3	.286	.556	.7	5.7
Career		3	.286	.556	.7	5.7
