= List of defunct NBA teams =

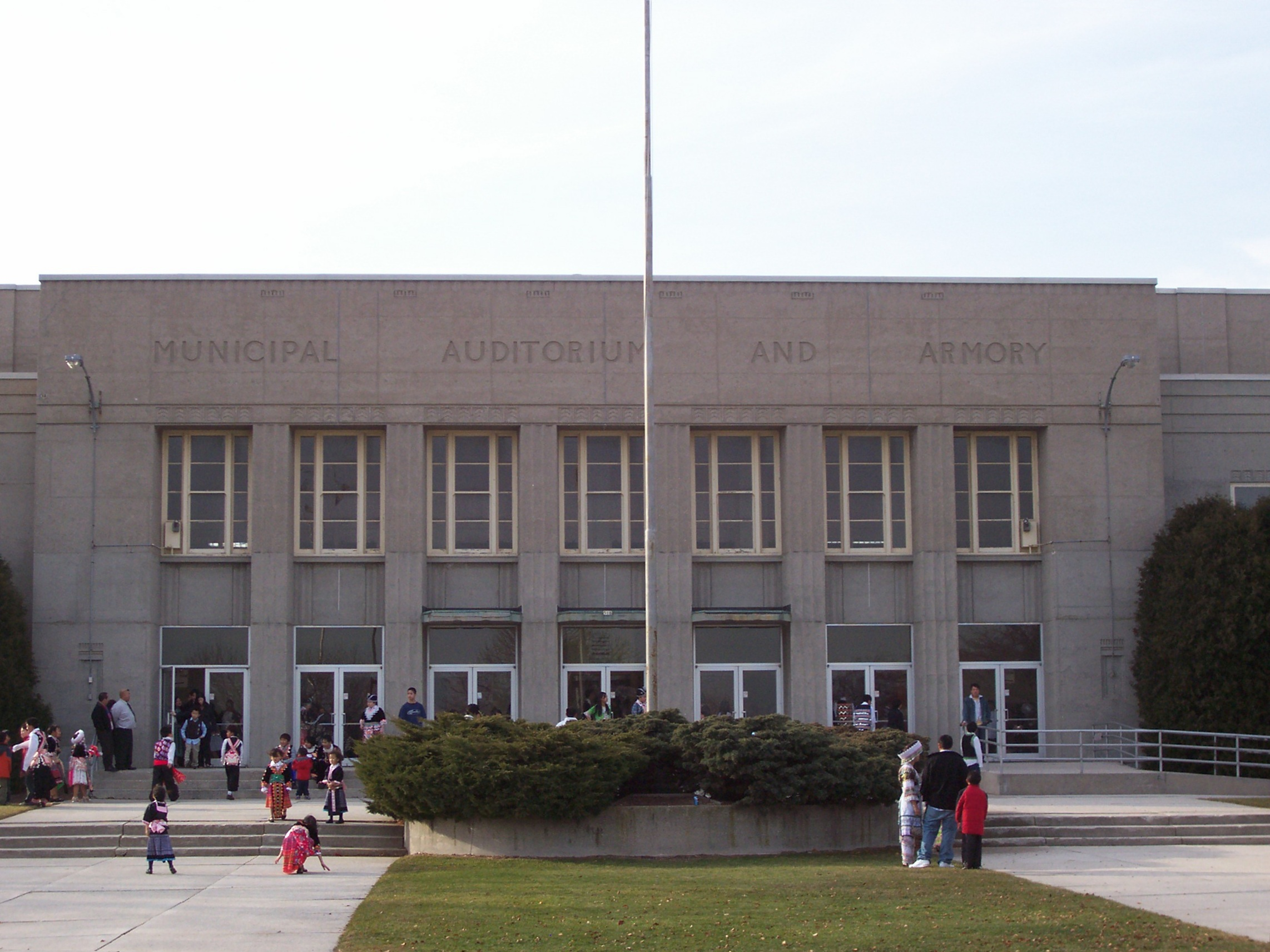
The Sheboygan Municipal Auditorium and Armory was the home arena for the Sheboygan Redskins.

The National Basketball Association (NBA) is a professional men's basketball league, consisting of thirty teams in North America (twenty-nine in the United States and one in Canada). The NBA was founded in New York City on June 6, 1946, as the Basketball Association of America (BAA). It adopted the name National Basketball Association at the start of the 1949–50 season when it absorbed the National Basketball League (NBL). The NBA is an active member of USA Basketball, which is recognized by the International Basketball Federation (FIBA) as the National Governing Body (NGB) for basketball in the country. The league is considered to be one of the four major professional sports leagues of North America.

There have been 15 defunct NBA franchises, of which nine played in only one NBA season. The Anderson Packers, the original Denver Nuggets, the Indianapolis Jets, the Sheboygan Red Skins, and the Waterloo Hawks had played in the NBL before joining the NBA (or BAA in the Jets' case), while the original Baltimore Bullets had played in the American Basketball League before joining the BAA/NBA. The Packers, Red Skins, and Waterloo Hawks left the NBA for the National Professional Basketball League, and are the only defunct teams to have ceased to exist in a league outside of the NBA. The original Bullets were the last defunct team to leave the NBA, having folded during the 1954–55 season, and are the only defunct team to have won an NBA championship. The Chicago Stags, the Indianapolis Olympians, the Cleveland Rebels, the Packers, and the Red Skins qualified for the playoffs in every year they were active in the league.

In addition to the 15 defunct BAA/NBA teams that did play in the league, there were also eight teams that were initially planned to join the BAA/NBA at various stages of the league's existence that ultimately never came to pass for one reason or another, with six of them being charter or expansion franchises to the league in question and two teams that were planned to join from other professional basketball leagues. Two franchises that were planned to be charter members for the BAA out in Buffalo and Indianapolis dropped out of the league almost immediately after their inaugural meeting was completed. Four other teams that were planned to exist at various points in the NBA's history as expansion franchises (one for Pittsburgh by the 1961–62 NBA season, one for Baltimore by the 1963–64 NBA season, one for Houston by the 1970–71 NBA season, and one for Toronto by the 1975–76 NBA season), but they never made it through as proper franchises in the NBA for one reason or another. The seventh that was planned for the NBA, the Oshkosh All-Stars, were planned to move to Milwaukee to become the Milwaukee All-Stars (potentially also merging operations with an independent team that was operating there called the Milwaukee Shooting Stars along the way there) for the 1949–50 NBA season following the official merger of the BAA and the older National Basketball League, which the All-Stars were a part of throughout their Oshkosh history, but the All-Stars reneged on their plans to move to Milwaukee and left the NBA by September 3, 1949 to play for the much smaller and more local-based Wisconsin State Basketball League instead, which affected the overall structure of that specific season for the NBA in the process. The eighth and final team that was planned for the NBA, the Cleveland Pipers, had planned to jump from the second rendition of the American Basketball League after winning its only championship there and merge operations with the Kansas City Steers if they had been approved for entry into the NBA, but they were ultimately rejected and instead folded operations soon afterward.

Among cities that have hosted defunct NBA franchises, Chicago, Cleveland, Denver, Detroit, Indianapolis, Toronto, and Washington, D.C. all currently have an NBA team, while Providence, Anderson and Sheboygan are all close to an hour away from a market with an NBA franchise and Pittsburgh is two hours away from an NBA franchise. St. Louis and Buffalo would receive replacement franchises that would later relocate.

== Defunct teams ==
*	Denotes team that won a championship

Team	City	Years active in NBA	Seasons in NBA	Win–loss record	Winning percentage	Playoff appearances	Reference
Anderson Packers^{[a]}	Anderson, Indiana	1949–1950	1	37–27	57.8%	1	
Baltimore Bullets*^{[b]}	Baltimore, Maryland	1947–1954^{[e]}	8	158–292	35.1%	3	
Buffalo	Buffalo, New York	Never played	0	0–0	N/A	0	
Chicago Stags	Chicago, Illinois	1946–1950	4	145–92	61.2%	4	
Cleveland Rebels	Cleveland, Ohio	1946–1947	1	30–30	50.0%	1	
Denver Nuggets^{[c]}	Denver, Colorado	1949–1950	1	11–51	17.7%	0	
Detroit Falcons	Detroit, Michigan	1946–1947	1	20–40	33.3%	0	
Indianapolis	Indianapolis, Indiana	Never played	0	0–0	N/A	0	
Indianapolis Jets	Indianapolis, Indiana	1948–1949	1	18–42	30.0%	0	
Indianapolis Olympians	Indianapolis, Indiana	1949–1953	4	132–137	49.1%	4	
Pittsburgh Ironmen	Pittsburgh, Pennsylvania	1946–1947	1	15–45	25.0%	0	
Providence Steamrollers	Providence, Rhode Island	1946–1949	3	46–122	27.4%	0	
Sheboygan Red Skins^{[g]}	Sheboygan, Wisconsin	1949–1950	1	22–40	35.5%	1	
St. Louis Bombers	St. Louis, Missouri	1946–1950	4	122–115	51.5%	3	
Toronto Huskies	Toronto, Ontario	1946–1947	1	22–38	36.7%	0	
Washington Capitols^{[h]}	Washington, D.C.	1946–1951^{[f]}	5	157–114	57.9%	4	
Waterloo Hawks^{[d]}	Waterloo, Iowa	1949–1950	1	19–43	30.6%	0	

== See also ==
- List of relocated NBA teams

== Notes ==
- ^{a} Not affiliated with the present-day Washington Wizards, who were known as the Chicago Packers from 1961 to 1962.
- ^{b} Not affiliated with the present-day Washington Wizards, who were known as the Baltimore/Capital/Washington Bullets from 1963 to 1997.
- ^{c} Not affiliated with the present-day Denver Nuggets
- ^{d} Not affiliated with the present-day Atlanta Hawks
- ^{e} The Bullets played 14 games during the 1954–55 season before becoming defunct.
- ^{f} The Capitols played 35 games during the 1950–51 season before becoming defunct.
- ^{g} Not affiliated with the National Football League Washington Commanders, who were known as the Washington Redskins from 1937 to 2020
- ^{h} Not affiliated with the National Hockey League Washington Capitals
