= Bob Faught =

American basketball player (1921–2002)

Personal information
- Born: September 2, 1921 Columbus, Ohio
- Died: April 23, 2002 (aged 80) Hilton Head, South Carolina
- Listed height: 6 ft 5 in (1.96 m)
- Listed weight: 185 lb (84 kg)

Career information
- High school: Cleveland Heights (Cleveland Heights, Ohio)
- College: Notre Dame (1941–1943)
- Playing career: 1946–1947
- Position: Forward
- Number: 10

Career history
- 1946–1947: Cleveland Rebels

Career highlights
- Third-team All-American – Converse (1942); Third-team All-American – Pic (1943)
- Stats at NBA.com
- Stats at Basketball Reference

Robert Edward Faught (September 2, 1921 – April 23, 2002) was an American professional basketball player. He played for the Cleveland Rebels of the Basketball Association of America (now known as the National Basketball Association).

== High school career ==
Bob attended Cleveland Heights High School in Cleveland Heights, Ohio.

== College career ==
Bob attended the University of Notre Dame in South Bend, Indiana.

== Professional career ==
Bob played 51 games for the Cleveland Rebels during the 1946–47 BAA season. When the Cleveland Rebels folded, Bob was drafted by the Philadelphia Warriors in the dispersal draft, but did not go on to play for the team.

== BAA career statistics ==
Legend
GP	Games played
FG%	Field-goal percentage
FT%	Free-throw percentage
APG	Assists per game
PPG	Points per game

=== Regular season ===
Year	Team	GP	FG%	FT%	APG	PPG
1946–47	Cleveland	51	.295	.575	.6	6.7
Career		51	.295	.575	.6	6.7

=== Playoffs ===
Year	Team	GP	FG%	FT%	APG	PPG
1946–47	Cleveland	3	.344	1.000	.3	8.3
Career		3	.344	1.000	.3	8.3
