= Leon Brown (basketball) =

American basketball player (1919–1990)

Personal information
- Born: October 12, 1919 Hastings, Nebraska
- Died: October 14, 1990 (aged 71)
- Listed height: 6 ft 3 in (1.91 m)
- Listed weight: 190 lb (86 kg)

Career information
- College: Wyoming (1944–1946)
- Position: Forward

Career history
- 1946: Cleveland Rebels
- 1946–1947: Baltimore Bullets
- Stats at NBA.com
- Stats at Basketball Reference

Leon S. Brown (October 12, 1919 – October 14, 1990) was an American professional basketball player. He played collegiately for the University of Wyoming. Professionally, Brown played in five games for the Cleveland Rebels of the Basketball Association of America during the 1946–47 season.

== BAA career statistics ==
Legend
GP	Games played
FG%	Field-goal percentage
FT%	Free-throw percentage
APG	Assists per game
PPG	Points per game

=== Regular season ===
Year	Team	GP	FG%	FT%	APG	PPG
1946–47	Cleveland	5	.000	.0	.0	.0
Career		5	.000	.0	.0	.0
