= Ned Endress =

American basketball player (1918–2010)

Personal information
- Born: March 2, 1918
- Died: June 19, 2010 (aged 92)
- Listed height: 6 ft 2 in (1.88 m)
- Listed weight: 200 lb (91 kg)

Career information
- College: Akron
- Playing career: 1946–1947
- Position: Forward / guard
- Number: 12

Career history
- 1943–1944: Cleveland Chase Brassmen
- 1944–1946: Cleveland Allmen Transfers
- 1946: Cleveland Rebels
- 1946–1947: Youngstown Cubs
- Stats at NBA.com
- Stats at Basketball Reference

Ned R. Endress (March 2, 1918 – June 19, 2010) was an American professional basketball player. He was a 6-foot-2-inch (1.88 m) 200 pounds (91 kg) forward-guard and played professionally for the Cleveland Rebels of the Basketball Association of America (BAA) in 1946–47, averaging 0.9 point and 0.3 assists per game. Prior to that, Endress played college basketball at University of Akron. He was a lifetime member of the National Basketball Retired Players Association.

== BAA career statistics ==
Legend
GP	Games played
FG%	Field-goal percentage
FT%	Free-throw percentage
APG	Assists per game
PPG	Points per game

=== Regular season ===
Year	Team	GP	FG%	FT%	APG	PPG
1946–47	Cleveland	16	.120	.533	.3	.9
Career		16	.120	.533	.3	.9
