= Bushnell, Nebraska =

Village in Kimball County, Nebraska, United States

- Village
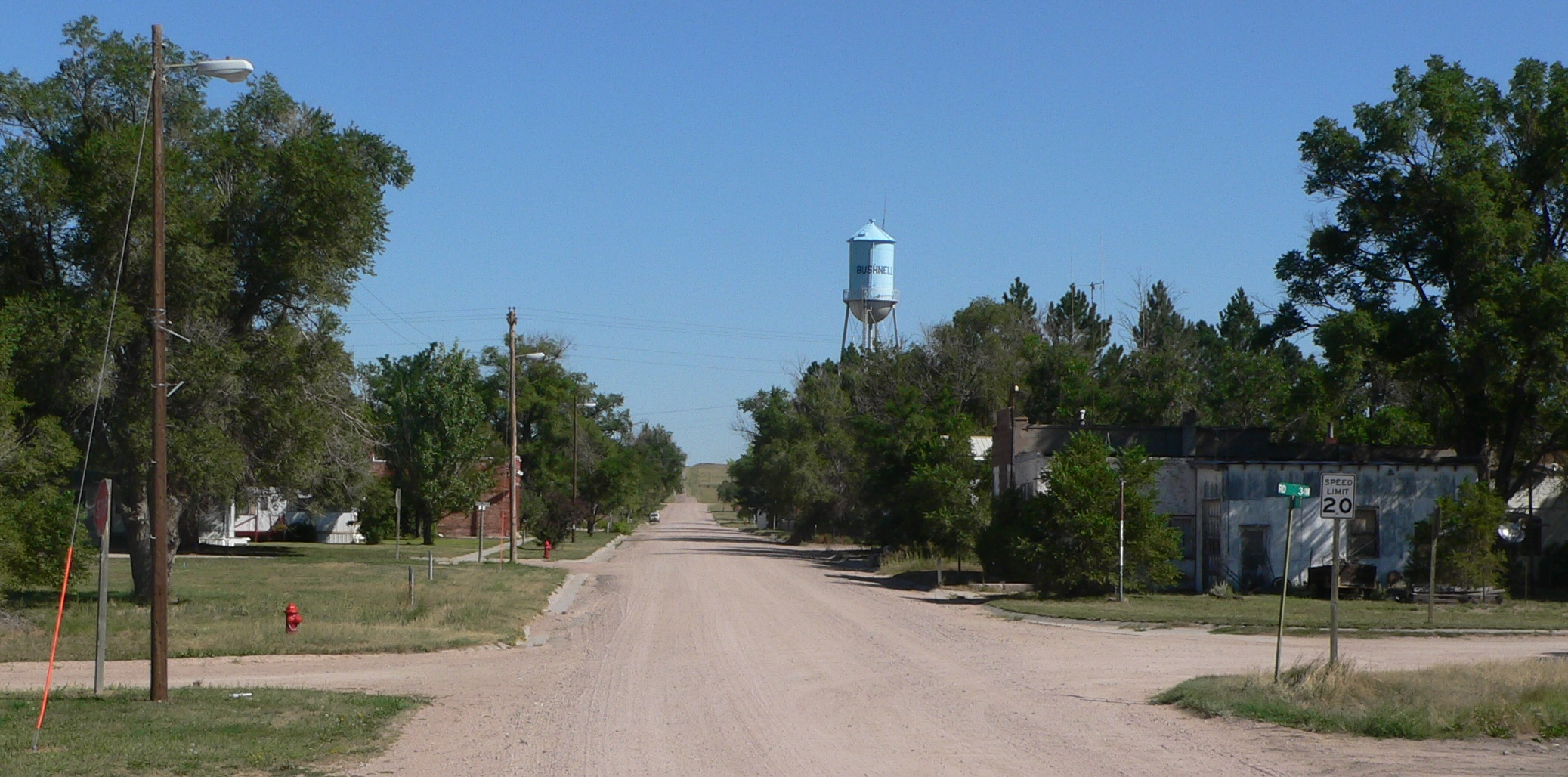
- Bushnell, looking north along Birch Street

- Location of Bushnell, Nebraska
- Coordinates: 41°13′58″N 103°53′28″W
- Country: United States
- State: Nebraska
- County: Kimball

Area
  - Total: 0.23 sq mi (0.59 km^{2})
  - Land: 0.23 sq mi (0.59 km^{2})
  - Water: 0 sq mi (0.00 km^{2})
- Elevation: 4,869 ft (1,484 m)

Population (2023)
  - Total: 111
  - Density: 503.6/sq mi (194.46/km^{2})
- Time zone: UTC-7 (Mountain (MST))
  - Summer (DST): UTC-6 (MDT)
- ZIP code: 69128
- Area code: 308
- FIPS code: 31-07415
- GNIS feature ID: 2397510

Bushnell is a village in Kimball County, Nebraska, United States. The population was 111 in 2023.

== Geography ==
According to the United States Census Bureau, the village has a total area of 0.23 square miles (0.60 km^{2}), all land.

=== Climate ===
Bushnell has a cold semi-arid climate (Köppen BSk), bordering on a dry-winter humid continental climate (Köppen Dwb).

Climate data for Bushnell 15S, Nebraska, 1991–2020 normals, 2002-2023 extremes: 5170ft (1576m)
Month	Jan	Feb	Mar	Apr	May	Jun	Jul	Aug	Sep	Oct	Nov	Dec	Year
Record high °F (°C)	70 (21)	71 (22)	78 (26)	86 (30)	96 (36)	101 (38)	104 (40)	100 (38)	97 (36)	85 (29)	77 (25)	72 (22)	104 (40)
Mean maximum °F (°C)	58.1 (14.5)	61.1 (16.2)	71.4 (21.9)	78.3 (25.7)	85.0 (29.4)	92.8 (33.8)	96.9 (36.1)	95.3 (35.2)	91.4 (33.0)	80.7 (27.1)	71.2 (21.8)	60.8 (16.0)	97.6 (36.4)
Mean daily maximum °F (°C)	38.3 (3.5)	39.2 (4.0)	48.9 (9.4)	55.8 (13.2)	64.8 (18.2)	76.7 (24.8)	84.3 (29.1)	82.7 (28.2)	74.3 (23.5)	59.5 (15.3)	47.2 (8.4)	37.7 (3.2)	59.1 (15.1)
Daily mean °F (°C)	24.8 (−4.0)	25.7 (−3.5)	33.9 (1.1)	40.8 (4.9)	50.4 (10.2)	60.9 (16.1)	67.8 (19.9)	66.2 (19.0)	57.7 (14.3)	43.9 (6.6)	32.6 (0.3)	24.4 (−4.2)	44.1 (6.7)
Mean daily minimum °F (°C)	11.2 (−11.6)	12.1 (−11.1)	18.8 (−7.3)	25.8 (−3.4)	35.9 (2.2)	45.1 (7.3)	51.2 (10.7)	49.6 (9.8)	41.1 (5.1)	28.2 (−2.1)	18.0 (−7.8)	11.0 (−11.7)	29.0 (−1.7)
Mean minimum °F (°C)	−11.0 (−23.9)	−11.9 (−24.4)	1.6 (−16.9)	11.9 (−11.2)	22.3 (−5.4)	35.3 (1.8)	44.0 (6.7)	40.9 (4.9)	29.6 (−1.3)	12.3 (−10.9)	−0.5 (−18.1)	−10.6 (−23.7)	−18.7 (−28.2)
Record low °F (°C)	−20 (−29)	−30 (−34)	−18 (−28)	−6 (−21)	11 (−12)	28 (−2)	36 (2)	31 (−1)	23 (−5)	−4 (−20)	−24 (−31)	−24 (−31)	−30 (−34)
Average precipitation inches (mm)	0.26 (6.6)	0.39 (9.9)	0.88 (22)	1.69 (43)	2.68 (68)	2.52 (64)	2.49 (63)	2.22 (56)	1.39 (35)	1.20 (30)	0.52 (13)	0.46 (12)	16.7 (422.5)
Average snowfall inches (cm)	4.10 (10.4)	8.70 (22.1)	8.70 (22.1)	8.20 (20.8)	2.70 (6.9)	0.00 (0.00)	0.00 (0.00)	0.00 (0.00)	0.20 (0.51)	3.90 (9.9)	6.30 (16.0)	8.80 (22.4)	51.6 (131.11)
Average precipitation days (≥ 0.01 in)	3.7	5.5	5.8	9.2	11.7	9.7	9.9	8.4	6.7	6.1	4.2	4.7	85.6
Average snowy days (≥ 0.1 in)	3.6	6.1	4.7	4.4	1.3	0.1	0.0	0.0	0.2	1.7	3.9	4.7	30.7
Source 1: NOAA
Source 2: XMACIS2 (temp records & monthly max/mins)

== History ==
Bushnell was founded in 1867. The village is named after Cornelius Scranton Bushnell, a major figure in the development of the ironclads during the Civil War.

== Demographics ==
Historical population
Census	Pop.	Note	%±
1920	321		—
1930	341		6.2%
1940	252		−26.1%
1950	225		−10.7%
1960	266		18.2%
1970	211		−20.7%
1980	187		−11.4%
1990	119		−36.4%
2000	162		36.1%
2010	124		−23.5%
2020	115		−7.3%
U.S. Decennial Census; 2012 Estimate

=== 2010 census ===
As of the census of 2010, there were 124 people, 60 households, and 39 families residing in the village. The population density was 539.1 inhabitants per square mile (208.1/km^{2}). There were 88 housing units at an average density of 382.6 per square mile (147.7/km^{2}). The racial makeup of the village was 96.8% White, 0.8% African American, and 2.4% from two or more races. Hispanic or Latino of any race were 3.2% of the population.

There were 60 households, of which 16.7% had children under the age of 18 living with them, 56.7% were married couples living together, 3.3% had a female householder with no husband present, 5.0% had a male householder with no wife present, and 35.0% were non-families. 31.7% of all households were made up of individuals, and 18.3% had someone living alone who was 65 years of age or older. The average household size was 2.07 and the average family size was 2.56.

The median age in the village was 54.5 years. 12.9% of residents were under the age of 18; 3.9% were between the ages of 18 and 24; 13.6% were from 25 to 44; 39.6% were from 45 to 64; and 29.8% were 65 years of age or older. The gender makeup of the village was 46.8% male and 53.2% female.

=== 2000 census ===
As of the census of 2000, there were 162 people, 70 households, and 44 families residing in the village. The population density was 769.7 inhabitants per square mile (297.2/km^{2}). There were 86 housing units at an average density of 408.6 per square mile (157.8/km^{2}). The racial makeup of the village was 99.38% White and 0.62% Pacific Islander. Hispanic or Latino of any race were 6.79% of the population.

There were 70 households, out of which 20.0% had children under the age of 18 living with them, 61.4% were married couples living together, 1.4% had a female householder with no husband present, and 37.1% were non-families. 28.6% of all households were made up of individuals, and 14.3% had someone living alone who was 65 years of age or older. The average household size was 2.31 and the average family size was 2.91.

In the village, the population was spread out, with 21.6% under the age of 18, 5.6% from 18 to 24, 18.5% from 25 to 44, 30.9% from 45 to 64, and 23.5% who were 65 years of age or older. The median age was 48 years. For every 100 females, there were 97.6 males. For every 100 females age 18 and over, there were 108.2 males.

As of 2000 the median income for a household in the village was $26,750, and the median income for a family was $30,750. Males had a median income of $26,250 versus $16,406 for females. The per capita income for the village was $13,024. About 8.5% of families and 7.2% of the population were below the poverty line, including none of those under the age of eighteen and 12.8% of those 65 or over.

== Culture ==
The annual Bushnell Day parade and festivities are held on the third Saturday in August.

== Notable people ==
- Ken Sailors - basketball player who led the University of Wyoming to the 1943 NCAA title and went on to play professionally in the BAA and NBA

== See also ==
- List of municipalities in Nebraska
