= Ray Corley =

American basketball player (1928–2007)

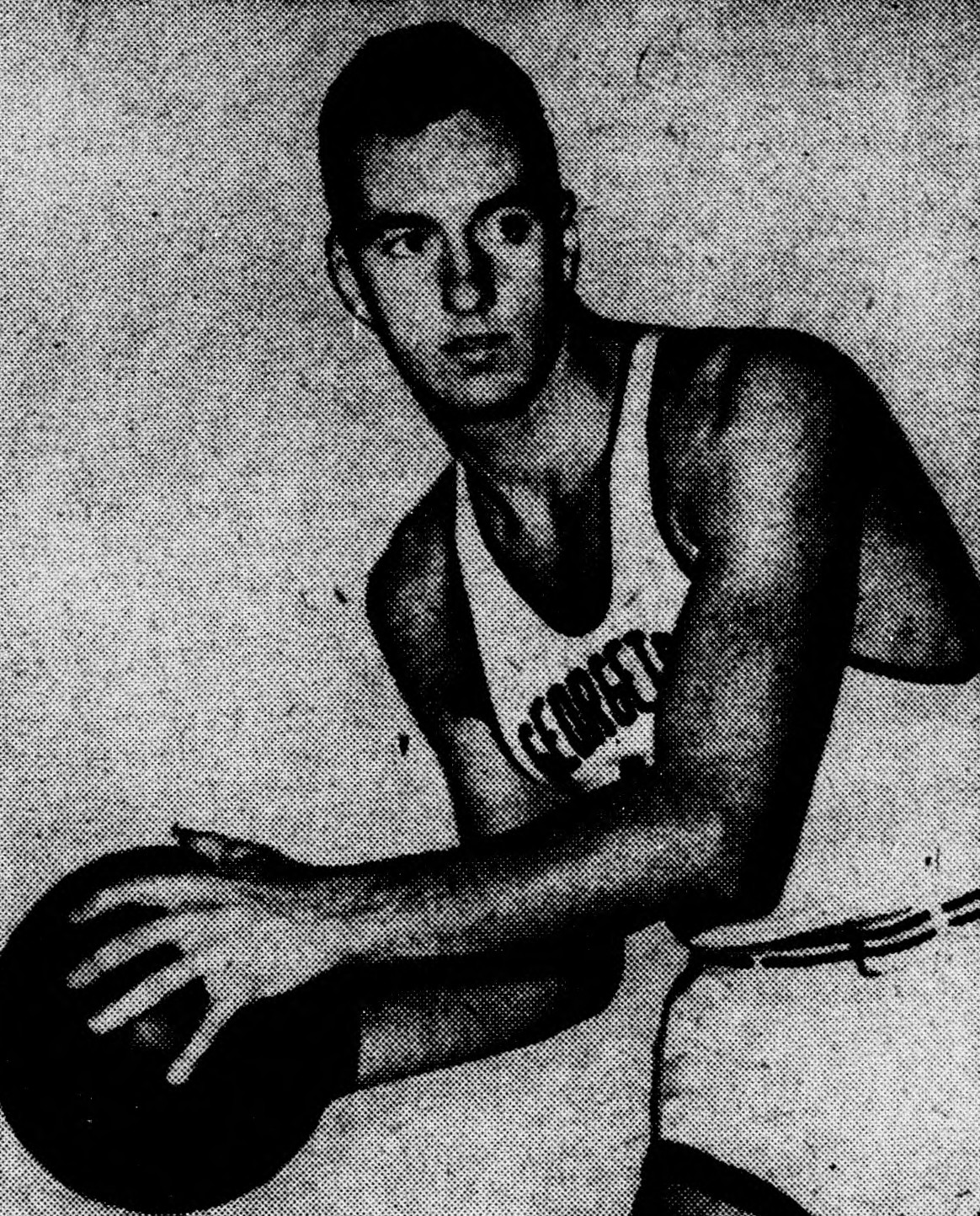
- Corley, circa 1948

Personal information
- Born: January 1, 1928 New York City, New York, U.S.
- Died: February 5, 2007 (aged 79) Suffolk County, New York, U.S.
- Listed height: 6 ft 0 in (1.83 m)
- Listed weight: 180 lb (82 kg)

Career information
- High school: St. Peter's Boys (Staten Island, New York)
- College: Notre Dame (1945–1946); Georgetown (1946–1949)
- NBA draft: 1949: 5th round, –
- Drafted by: Providence Steamrollers
- Playing career: 1949–1953
- Position: Guard
- Number: 4, 9 ,12, 4

Career history
- 1949–1950: Syracuse Nationals
- 1950–1951: Baltimore Bullets
- 1951: Tri-Cities Blackhawks
- 1951: Utica Pros
- 1951–1952: Wilkes-Barre Barons
- 1952: Elmira Colonels
- 1952–1953: Fort Wayne Pistons
- Stats at NBA.com
- Stats at Basketball Reference

Raymond Charles Corley (January 1, 1928 – February 5, 2007) was an American professional basketball player. Corley was selected in the fifth round of the 1949 BAA Draft by the Providence Steamrollers after a collegiate career at Georgetown. He played for the Syracuse Nationals, Baltimore Bullets, Tri-Cities Blackhawks and Fort Wayne Pistons in his three-season NBA career. Ray is sometimes listed as the brother of fellow basketball player Ken Corley, but they were from different families, with Ken being from Oklahoma and Ray from New York City.

== Career statistics ==
Legend
GP	Games played	GS	Games started	MPG	Minutes per game
FG%	Field goal percentage	3P%	3-point field goal percentage	FT%	Free throw percentage
RPG	Rebounds per game	APG	Assists per game	SPG	Steals per game
BPG	Blocks per game	PPG	Points per game	**Bold**	Career high

=== NBA ===
==== Regular season ====
Year	Team	GP	MPG	FG%	FT%	RPG	APG	PPG
1949–50	Syracuse	**60**		.316	.615		1.8	**5.2**
1950–51	Baltimore	16		.254	.538	2.1	1.4	3.0
1950–51	Tri-Cities	18		**.341**	.552	**2.4**	**2.1**	4.1
1952–53	Fort Wayne	8	8.1	.125	.833	.6	.6	1.4
Career		102	8.1	.304	.601	2.0	1.7	4.3

==== Playoffs ====
Year	Team	GP	FG%	FT%	APG	PPG
1949–50	Syracuse	6	.167	.455	1.7	2.8
