= 1946–47 Cleveland Rebels season =

- Head coach: Dutch Dehnert (fired; 17–20); Roy Clifford (13–10)
- General manager: Roy Clifford
- Owner: Albert C. Sutphin
- Arena: Cleveland Arena

Results
- Record: 30–30 (.500)
- Place: Division: 3rd (Western)
- Playoff finish: Lost BAA Quarterfinals
- Stats at Basketball Reference
- Radio: WJW

The 1946–47 Cleveland Rebels season was the first and only season of the Cleveland Rebels of the Basketball Association of America (BAA/NBA). Their record was 30–30, which was good enough to make it to the first ever BAA/NBA Playoffs ever held, though they would be eliminated in the first round by the New York Knickerbockers. Head coach Dutch Dehnert was fired by the team on February 12, 1947, and was subsequently replaced for the rest of the season by Roy Clifford. Despite them being a competitive, albeit average, team in the BAA, the Rebels were the first of the four inaugural BAA teams to fold operations following the conclusion of this season due to the team's owner stating high losses for the team's operations. Greater details on their first and only season would be explored in Charley Rosen's book called "The First Tip-Off: The Incredible Story of the Birth of the NBA", with an entire chapter dedicated to the Rebels' woes and troubles in their only season of play within the BAA that ultimately lead them to their quick downfall following their sole playoff season, primarily with how the ownership of the Rebels overestimated both the demographics and population of Cleveland at the time the BAA started and the departure of the Cleveland Rams from the National Football League (NFL) for sports entertainment in the city of Cleveland for thinking the Rebels would be the sole sports team available within the city at the time while completely underestimating the impact that the newly-formed Cleveland Browns from the also newly-formed All-American Football Conference (AAFC) would have for Clevelanders to watch out for as an alternative to watch for within the sports world instead. Cleveland would eventually get themselves a new team by 1970 when the Cleveland Cavaliers were created as an expansion franchise for the since-rebranded NBA alongside the Buffalo Braves (now Los Angeles Clippers) and Portland Trail Blazers.

== Roster ==
Due to this being the first and only season in the franchise's history, the BAA didn't utilize a draft system like they would in future seasons of the BAA/NBA and instead relied upon some combination of the head coach and the general manager of the team finding and signing players in time to start out their training camp period for the season. For the Rebels, general manager Roy Clifford hired former player and Sheboygan Red Skins head coach Dutch Dehnert to be the inaugural head coach of the team, with the players that they brought in being a clashing mixture of recent (at the time) college All-American type of players from Clifford's end (with guys like Ken Sailors from the University of Wyoming, Mel Riebe from the local Euclid High School (formerly from the Cleveland Chase Brassmen/Allmen Transfers NBL team), Frank Baumholtz from Ohio University, Bob Faught (a local-born player) from the University of Notre Dame, and later George Nostrand from the University of Wyoming after he was cut from the Toronto Huskies being in mind for Clifford) and older, slower guys that were used to handling the ball a lot from Dehnert's end (with guys like Nick Shaback from James Monroe High School in New York City, Ben Scharnus from Seton Hall College, Leo Mogus from Youngstown State University, and Kleggie Hermsen from the University of Minnesota (and a former Sheboygan Red Skins player) being in mind for Dehnert) to open up the season for Cleveland's roster, with the clashing styles being a factor in Dehnert's firing (though he later took on the role of team scout for the rest of the season instead of get outright removed from the team completely) and eventual replacing for Clifford as the new head coach near the end of the season.

1946–47 Cleveland Rebels roster
Players

Pos.	No.	Player	Height	Weight	DOB	From
G	5	Frankie Baumholtz	5 ft 10 in (1.78 m)	170 lb (77 kg)	1918-10-07	Ohio
F	10	Bob Faught	6 ft 5 in (1.96 m)	185 lb (84 kg)	1921-09-02	Notre Dame
F	6	Hank Lefkowitz	6 ft 2 in (1.88 m)	190 lb (86 kg)	1923-08-31	Case Western Reserve
F/C	11	George Nostrand	6 ft 8 in (2.03 m)	195 lb (88 kg)	1924-01-25	Wyoming
G/F	3	Mel Riebe	5 ft 11 in (1.80 m)	180 lb (82 kg)	1916-07-12	Euclid HS (OH)
C	7	Ed Sadowski	6 ft 5 in (1.96 m)	240 lb (109 kg)	1917-07-11	Seton Hall
G	4	Kenny Sailors	5 ft 10 in (1.78 m)	175 lb (79 kg)	1921-01-14	Wyoming
F	8	Ben Scharnus	6 ft 2 in (1.88 m)	173 lb (78 kg)	1917-12-11	Seton Hall
G	9	Nick Shaback	5 ft 11 in (1.80 m)	180 lb (82 kg)	1918-09-10	James Monroe HS (NY)
G	14	Ray Wertis	5 ft 11 in (1.80 m)		1922-01-01	St. John's

Coaches
Head coach
- Roy Clifford

Legend
- (DP) Unsigned draft pick
- (FA) Free agent
- (S) Suspended
- Injured

Roster

== Regular season ==
=== Season standings ===
#	Western Division				
#	Team	W	L	PCT	GB
1	x-Chicago Stags	39	22	.639	–
2	x-St. Louis Bombers	38	23	.623	1
3	x-Cleveland Rebels	30	30	.500	8.5
4	Detroit Falcons	20	40	.333	18.5
5	Pittsburgh Ironmen	15	45	.250	23.5

=== Game log ===
1946–47 game log
Total: 30–30
November

Game	Date	Team	Score	High points	Location Attendance	Record
1	November 3	Toronto	W 71–60	Frankie Baumholtz (25)		1–0
2	November 10	Washington	W 92–68	Frankie Baumholtz (19)		2–0
3	November 16	@ St. Louis	L 74–83 (OT)	Leo Mogus (16)		2–1
4	November 17	Chicago	L 76–78	Mel Riebe (31)		2–2
5	November 19	@ Toronto	W 74–72	Leo Mogus (33)		3–2
6	November 23	@ New York	L 76–82 (OT)	Mel Riebe (27)		3–3
7	November 24	Pittsburgh	W 62–60	Mel Riebe (20)		4–3
8	November 26	@ Detroit	L 46–66	Mel Riebe (13)		4–4
9	November 27	@ Pittsburgh	L 60–62	Nick Shaback (14)		4–5
10	November 29	@ Toronto	W 87–72	Leo Mogus (20)		5–5

December

Game	Date	Team	Score	High points	Location Attendance	Record
11	December 1	Detroit	W 49–47	Dick Schulz (12)		6–5
12	December 7	@ Chicago	L 78–86	Mel Riebe (20)		6–6
13	December 8	Philadelphia	W 72–66	Frankie Baumholtz (23)		7–6
14	December 10	St. Louis	L 61–62 (OT)	Leo Mogus (22)		7–7
15	December 11	@ Chicago	L 79–88	Frankie Baumholtz (23)		7–8
16	December 14	@ Washington	L 52–72	Frankie Baumholtz (14)		7–9
17	December 15	New York	W 70–52	Frankie Baumholtz (18)		8–9
18	December 17	Toronto	W 78–62	Baumholtz, Sadowski (18)		9–9
19	December 18	@ New York	W 56–53	Kenny Sailors (19)		10–9
20	December 19	@ Philadelphia	L 44–58	Frankie Baumholtz (11)		10–10
21	December 22	Pittsburgh	L 74–78 (OT)	Frankie Baumholtz (19)		10–11
22	December 29	Chicago	L 79–87 (OT)	Frankie Baumholtz (27)		10–12
23	December 31	St. Louis	L 59–68	Frankie Baumholtz (21)		10–13

January

Game	Date	Team	Score	High points	Location Attendance	Record
24	January 1	@ Pittsburgh	W 61–48	George Nostrand (16)		11–13
25	January 4	@ Washington	L 64–78	Mel Riebe (13)		11–14
26	January 6	@ Boston	W 64–53	Frankie Baumholtz (14)		12–14
27	January 9	@ Providence	L 68–91	Frankie Baumholtz (20)		12–15
28	January 14	Providence	L 74–78	Ed Sadowski (21)		12–16
29	January 16	@ St. Louis	W 63–59	Frankie Baumholtz (24)		13–16
30	January 19	New York	W 79–72	Frankie Baumholtz (22)		14–16
31	January 22	@ Detroit	W 61–47	Frankie Baumholtz (19)		15–16
32	January 23	@ Philadelphia	L 78–83	Mel Riebe (17)		15–17
33	January 27	@ Toronto	W 88–82	Frankie Baumholtz (24)		16–17
34	January 28	Toronto	W 80–70	Bob Faught (17)		17–17

February

Game	Date	Team	Score	High points	Location Attendance	Record
35	February 1	@ St. Louis	L 48–70	Ed Sadowski (18)		17–18
36	February 2	Washington	L 81–107	Baumholtz, Sailors (18)		17–19
37	February 9	Detroit	L 69–74	Frankie Baumholtz (21)		17–20
38	February 11	Providence	W 85–76	Ed Sadowski (22)		18–20
39	February 13	@ Philadelphia	L 48–61	Ed Sadowski (17)		18–21
40	February 15	@ New York	W 90–84	Frankie Baumholtz (24)		19–21
41	February 16	Philadelphia	W 75–71	Frankie Baumholtz (20)		20–21
42	February 18	Boston	W 84–73	Frankie Baumholtz (20)		21–21
43	February 22	@ Providence	L 77–85	Ed Sadowski (19)		21–22
44	February 23	Washington	L 83–91	Kenny Sailors (15)		21–23
45	February 25	St. Louis	L 76–96	Riebe, Sadowski (19)		21–24
46	February 26	@ Pittsburgh	W 74–53	Kenny Sailors (17)		22–24
47	February 28	@ Boston	L 62–69	Kenny Sailors (16)		22–25

March

Game	Date	Team	Score	High points	Location Attendance	Record
48	March 2	Philadelphia	W 72–69	Ed Sadowski (18)		23–25
49	March 4	Providence	W 82–76	Kenny Sailors (26)		24–25
50	March 9	Chicago	L 78–107	Ed Sadowski (27)		24–26
51	March 11	Pittsburgh	W 78–72	George Nostrand (18)		25–26
52	March 12	@ Detroit	W 89–81	Ed Sadowski (35)		26–26
53	March 16	New York	L 69–81	Ed Sadowski (25)		26–27
54	March 18	@ Boston	W 67–58	Ed Sadowski (27)		27–27
55	March 20	@ Providence	L 73–76	Ed Sadowski (29)		27–28
56	March 22	@ Chicago	W 67–58	Ed Sadowski (20)		28–28
57	March 23	Detroit	W 69–63	Sadowski, Sailors (24)		29–28
58	March 25	Boston	W 72–64	Kenny Sailors (21)		30–28
59	March 29	@ Washington	L 69–79	Ed Sadowski (21)		30–29
60	March 30	Boston	L 66–71	Faught, Sadowski (19)		30–30

== Playoffs ==
=== BAA First Round ===
(E3) New York Knicks vs. (W3) Cleveland Rebels: Knicks win series 2-1

- Game 1 @ Cleveland (April 2): Cleveland 77, New York 51
- Game 2 @ New York (April 5): New York 86, Cleveland 74
- Game 3 @ New York (April 9): New York 93, Cleveland 71

== Transactions ==
=== Trades ===
December 4, 1946	To Cleveland Rebels George Nostrand	To Toronto Huskies Kleggie Hermsen
December 16, 1946	To Cleveland Rebels Ed Sadowski; Ray Wertis	To Toronto Huskies Leo Mogus; Dick Schulz; Cash

== Season losses ==
Throughout this season, the Cleveland Rebels only had an average total of 2,259 paid attendees per game, with net receipts totaling up to $64,638 for the season and estimated losses totaling up to around $200,000 for this season. Not only that, but it was quickly revealed early on during the season that both the paid tickets and the complimentary tickets that the team would give out during the season to try and help gain fans for the long-term future would actually hold a sixty cent tax that the team's owner, Albert C. Sutphin, wanted to see included with the original cost for the actual tickets sold and given away, which led to further struggles with trying to attract fans to going to see their games in their home venue properly since the regular worker felt like they were being scammed out of extra money or were being involved in a bait-and-switch situation at hand, depending upon the context of which version of the tickets were being given out or sold to people. As a result of those discouraging numbers alongside a presumingly lack of interested number of fans that wanted to see the Rebels compete even when they were in the inaugural 1947 BAA playoffs, team owner Albert Sutphin would either be the only team owner to fold his franchise entirely or be one of two team owners (alongside the owners of the Detroit Falcons) to end up folding the franchise entirely before the start of the inaugural 1947 BAA draft on June 2, 1947.

== Dispersal Draft ==
During the first ever end of season meeting for the Basketball Association of America's board of governors held on May 21, 1947, the Rebels would confirm to the league that they would not continue playing for another season. This would notably lead to them joining the Detroit Falcons as the only inaugural Basketball Association of America (BAA) teams to miss out on participating in the inaugural 1947 BAA draft (held on June 2 that year) entirely. After the Rebels became the first team to officially disband as a franchise a week after the draft ended on June 9, 1947, the BAA held what would become its first ever dispersal draft on August 2 that year, with the remaining eight teams left in the BAA (the surviving seven teams from the league's first successful season alongside the original Baltimore Bullets franchise that came from the original American Basketball League by a dispute with that league) taking players that were originally from the Rebels, Detroit Falcons, Pittsburgh Ironmen, and Toronto Huskies franchises. The following teams acquired these players from the Rebels during the dispersal draft period.

- Baltimore Bullets: Hank Lefkowitz
- Boston Celtics: John Janisch, Mel Riebe, Ed Sadowski, & Ben Scharnus
- Chicago Stags: Ken Sailors
- Philadelphia Warriors: Bob Faught
- Providence Steamrollers: Frank Baumholtz, George Nostrand, & Ray Wertis
- St. Louis Bombers: Leon Brown
- Washington Capitols: Nick Shaback
