= Ed Sadowski (basketball) =

American basketball player

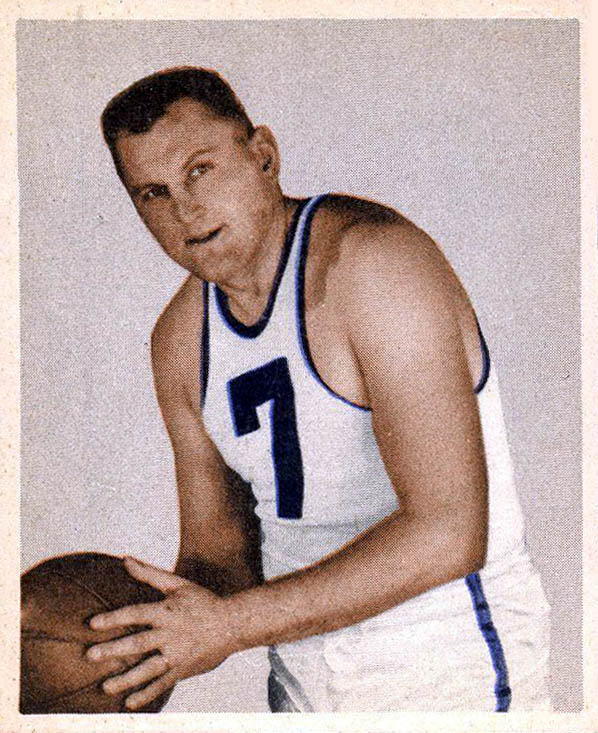
- Sadowski depicted on a Bowman trading card, 1948

Personal information
- Born: July 11, 1917 Akron, Ohio, U.S.
- Died: September 18, 1990 (aged 73) Wall Township, New Jersey, U.S.
- Listed height: 6 ft 5 in (1.96 m)
- Listed weight: 240 lb (109 kg)

Career information
- College: Seton Hall (1936–1940)
- Playing career: 1940–1950
- Position: Center
- Number: 20, 7, 22, 14, 9, 17

Career history

Playing
- 1940–1941: Detroit Eagles
- 1944–1946: Fort Wayne Zollner Pistons
- 1946: Toronto Huskies
- 1946–1947: Cleveland Rebels
- 1947–1948: Boston Celtics
- 1948–1949: Philadelphia Warriors
- 1949–1950: Baltimore Bullets

Coaching
- 1946: Toronto Huskies

Career highlights
- All-NBL First Team (1941); NBL Rookie of the Year (1941); NBL champion (1945); All-BAA First Team (1948)
- Stats at NBA.com
- Stats at Basketball Reference

Edward Anthony Sadowski (July 11, 1917 – September 18, 1990) was an American professional basketball player.

== Early life ==
Sadowski was born in Akron, Ohio. He was part of a large family, with at least three brothers and three sisters.

== College athletics ==
He starred at Seton Hall University during the late 1930s and early 1940s. A 6-foot-5-inch (1.96 m) center, he led Seton Hall to its only undefeated season (1939–1940).

== Career ==
=== Professional basketball ===
Sadowski later played professionally in the National Basketball League, the Basketball Association of America, and the National Basketball Association (which was formed after a merger between the first two leagues in this list).

As a member of the Boston Celtics in 1947–48, Sadowski ranked third in the BAA in points per game (19.4) and was named to the All-BAA first team, making him the first ever Boston Celtics player to be named to the All-BAA/NBA Team. He led the Celtics to their first ever postseason, but they lost to the Chicago Stags 2 games to 1.

=== After basketball ===
Retiring from basketball in 1950, he worked in labor relations for the Cities Service Oil Company.

== Personal life and later years ==
Sadowski and his wife, Charlotte, had two sons, Edward and Bill. Sadowski died of cancer at age 73 in his Wall Township, New Jersey home in 1990.

== Career playing statistics ==
Legend
GP	Games played	FGM	Field-goals made
FG%	Field-goal percentage	FTM	Free-throws made
FTA	Free-throws attempted	FT%	Free-throw percentage
APG	Assists per game	PTS	Points
PPG	Points per game	**Bold**	Career high

†	Denotes seasons in which Sadowski's team won an NBL championship

=== NBL ===
==== Regular season ====
Year	Team	GP	FGM	FTM	FTA	FT%	PTS	PPG
1940–41	Detroit	24	95	66	101	.653	256	**10.7**
1944–45†	F.W. Zollner Pistons	1	4	2			10	10.0
1945–46	F.W. Zollner Pistons	**34**	**122**	**82**	**120**	**.683**	**326**	9.6
Career		59	221	150	221	.670	592	10.0

==== Playoffs ====
Year	Team	GP	FGM	FTM	FTA	FT%	PTS	PPG
1941	Detroit	3	7	9	23			7.7
1945†	F.W. Zollner Pistons	**7**	17	11	**45**			6.4
1946	F.W. Zollner Pistons	4	**20**	**17**	23	.739	**57**	**14.3**
Career		14	44	37	23	.739	125	8.9

=== BAA/NBA ===
==== Regular season ====
Year	Team	GP	FG%	FT%	APG	PPG
1946–47	Toronto	10	.349	.682	.8	19.1
1946–47	Cleveland	43	.375	.664	.9	16.0
1947–48	Boston	47	.323	.697	1.6	**19.4**
1948–49	Philadelphia	**60**	**.405**	.686	**2.7**	15.3
1949–50	Philadelphia	17	.307	.693	2.3	8.6
1949–50	Baltimore	52	.328	**.745**	1.9	14.0
Career		229	.354	.697	1.8	15.6

==== Playoffs ====
Year	Team	GP	FG%	FT%	APG	PPG
1947	Cleveland	**3**	**.393**	**.794**	1.7	**23.7**
1948	Boston	**3**	.345	.605	**2.0**	20.3
1949	Philadelphia	2	.214	.615	1.5	10.0
Career		8	.338	.682	1.8	19.0

== Head coaching record ==
Legend
Regular season	G	Games coached	W	Games won	L	Games lost	W–L %	Win–loss %
Playoffs	PG	Playoff games	PW	Playoff wins	PL	Playoff losses	PW–L %	Playoff win–loss %

Team	Year	G	W	L	W–L%	Finish	PG	PW	PL	PW–L%	Result
Toronto	1946–47	12	3	9	.250	(resigned)	—	—	—	—	—
