= Dick Schulz =

American basketball player

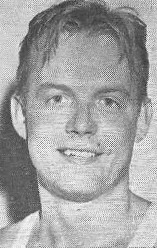

Personal information
- Born: January 3, 1917 Racine, Wisconsin, U.S.
- Died: June 26, 1998 (aged 81)
- Listed height: 6 ft 2 in (1.88 m)
- Listed weight: 192 lb (87 kg)

Career information
- High school: Washington Park (Racine, Wisconsin)
- Playing career: 1942–1950
- Position: Small forward / shooting guard
- Number: 14, 18, 21, 22, 4

Career history
- 1942–1946: Sheboygan Red Skins
- 1946: Cleveland Rebels
- 1946–1947: Toronto Huskies
- 1947–1948: Baltimore Bullets
- 1948–1949: Washington Capitols
- 1949–1950: Tri-Cities Blackhawks
- 1950: Sheboygan Red Skins

Career highlights
- BAA champion (1948); NBL champion (1943)
- Stats at NBA.com
- Stats at Basketball Reference

Richard Albert Schulz (January 3, 1917 – June 26, 1998) was an American professional basketball player.

Schulz attended Washington Park High School in Racine, Wisconsin. He attended the University of Wisconsin–Madison during the 1936–37 season but did not play on the varsity basketball team.

A 6'2" forward/guard, Schulz played four seasons (1946–1950) in the Basketball Association of America (BAA) and National Basketball Association (NBA) as a member of the Cleveland Rebels, Toronto Huskies, Baltimore Bullets, Washington Capitols, Tri-Cities Blackhawks, and Sheboygan Red Skins. He averaged 5.6 points per game in his BAA/NBA career and won a BAA championship with Baltimore in 1948.

== BAA/NBA career statistics ==
Legend
GP	Games played	GS	Games started	MPG	Minutes per game
FG%	Field goal percentage	3P%	3-point field goal percentage	FT%	Free throw percentage
RPG	Rebounds per game	APG	Assists per game	SPG	Steals per game
BPG	Blocks per game	PPG	Points per game	**Bold**	Career high
†	Won an NBA championship

=== Regular season ===
Year	Team	GP	FG%	FT%	APG	PPG
1946–47	Cleveland	16	.244	.645	1.1	6.6
1946–47	Toronto	41	.234	.692	1.0	6.2
1947–48†	Baltimore	48	.284	.731	.6	**8.0**
1948–49	Washington	**50**	.234	.714	1.1	3.9
1949–50	Washington	13	.267	.679	.8	3.3
1949–50	Tri-Cities	8	.289	.714	1.0	5.1
1949–50	Sheboygan	29	**.311**	**.803**	**1.7**	4.3
Career		205	.259	.719	1.0	5.6

=== Playoffs ===
Year	Team	GP	FG%	FT%	APG	PPG
1948†	Baltimore	11	.193	.745	.6	**7.5**
1949	Washington	**11**	**.230**	.571	**2.5**	4.9
1950	Sheboygan	3	.111	**1.000**	.7	4.0
Career		25	.203	.708	1.4	5.9
