= Frank Baumholtz =

American baseball player (1918–1997)

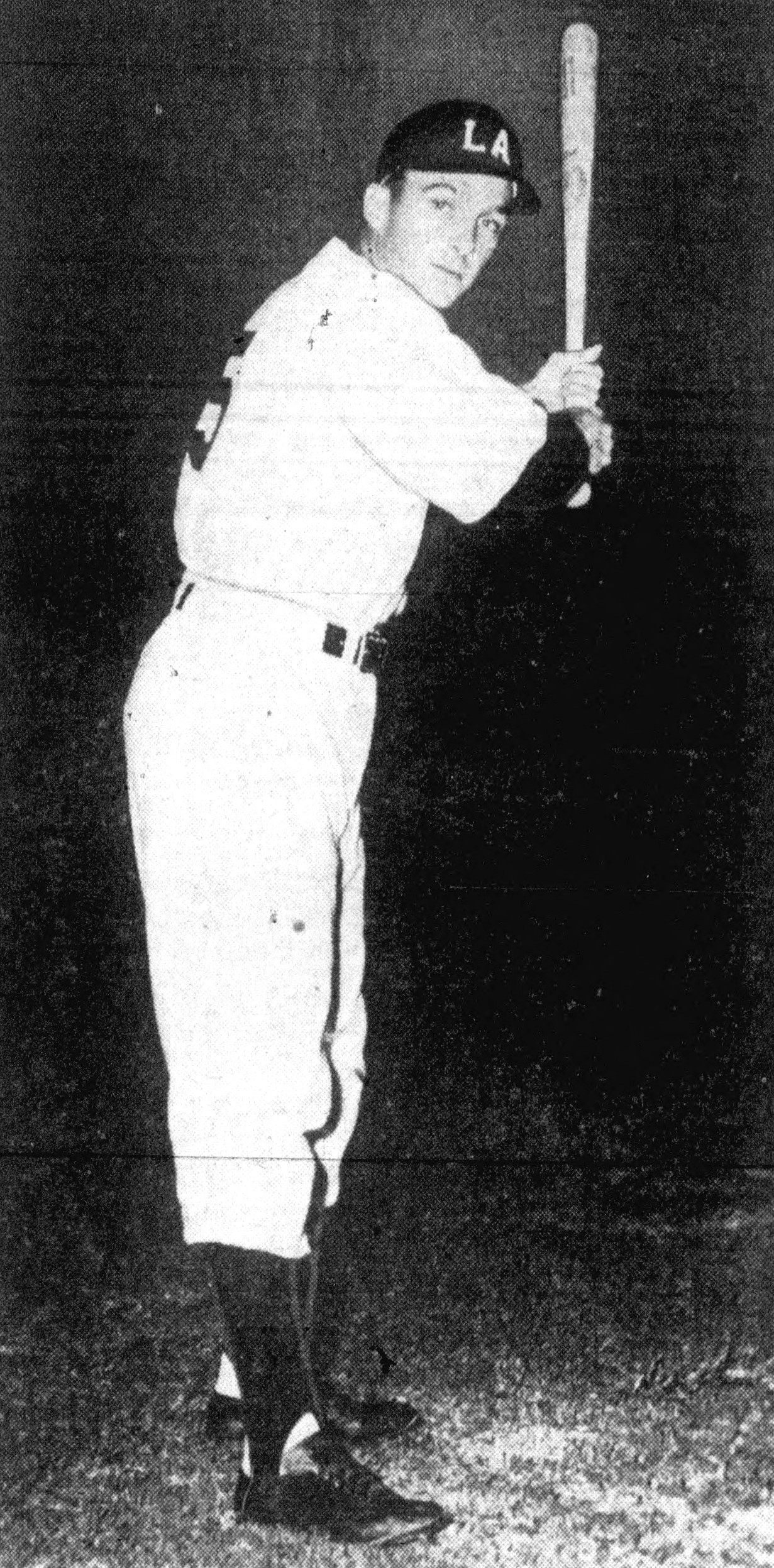
- Baumholtz, circa 1950
- Outfielder
- Born: October 7, 1918; Midvale, Ohio, U.S.
- Died: December 14, 1997 (aged 79); Winter Springs, Florida, U.S.
- Batted: Left Threw: Left

MLB debut
- April 15, 1947, for the Cincinnati Reds

Last MLB appearance
- May 26, 1957, for the Philadelphia Phillies

MLB statistics
- Batting average: .290
- Home runs: 25
- Runs batted in: 272
- Stats at Baseball Reference

Teams
- Cincinnati Reds (1947–1949); Chicago Cubs (1949, 1951–1955); Philadelphia Phillies (1956–1957)
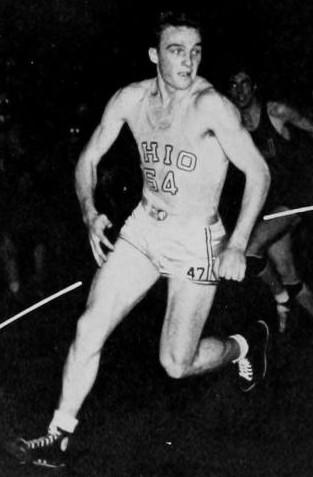
Basketball career
Personal information
Listed height	5 ft 10 in (1.78 m)
Listed weight	170 lb (77 kg)
Career information
High school	Midvale (Midvale, Ohio)
College	Ohio (1939–1941)
Playing career	1945–1947
Position	Guard
Number	5
Career history
1945–1946	Youngstown Bears
1946–1947	Cleveland Rebels
Career highlights
All-BAA Second Team (1947); All-NBL Second Team (1946); Consensus second-team All-American (1941); No. 54 retired by Ohio Bobcats
Stats at NBA.com
Stats at Basketball Reference

Frank Conrad Baumholtz (October 7, 1918 – December 14, 1997) was an American professional baseball and basketball player. He was an outfielder for Major League Baseball's Cincinnati Reds (1947–49), Chicago Cubs (1949 and 1951–55) and Philadelphia Phillies (1956–57). He played two seasons of professional basketball for the Youngstown Bears of the National Basketball League during the 1945–46 season, and the Cleveland Rebels of the Basketball Association of America during the 1946–47 season. He was born in Midvale, Ohio.

== College career ==
Baumholtz played college basketball at Ohio University, playing the guard position. Baumholtz was a first-team All-American in basketball in 1941, his senior year, leading the Bobcats to the finals of the 1941 National Invitation Tournament, the most prestigious tournament in the country at the time. He was named the tournament's most valuable player. His No. 54 jersey hangs from the rafters of the Convocation Center. It was retired on Feb. 4, 1995, which was declared "Frank Baumholtz Day" in the city of Athens, Ohio and on campus and was the only number so honored at the school until 2007 when Dave Jamerson and Walter Luckett had their jerseys retired as well.

== Professional career ==
=== Basketball ===
He played two seasons of professional basketball. In the 1945–46 season, he suited up for the Youngstown Bears of the NBL. The following year, he played for the Cleveland Rebels of the fledgling Basketball Association of America, the direct predecessor to today's National Basketball Association. During the 1946–47 season, Baumholtz played in 45 games, averaging 14.0 points per game and being selected to the All-BAA Second Team.

=== Baseball ===
Baumholtz finished 5th in voting for the 1947 National League Rookie of the Year for playing in 151 Games and having 643 At Bats, 96 Runs, 182 Hits, 32 Doubles, 9 Triples, 5 Home Runs, 45 RBI, 6 Stolen Bases, 56 Walks, .283 Batting Average, .341 On-base percentage, .384 Slugging Percentage, 247 Total Bases and 11 Sacrifice Hits.

Baumholtz finished 17th in voting for the 1952 National League MVP for playing in 103 Games and having 409 At Bats, 59 Runs, 133 Hits, 17 Doubles, 4 Triples, 4 Home Runs, 35 RBI, 5 Stolen Bases, 27 Walks, .325 Batting Average, .371 On-base percentage, .416 Slugging Percentage, 170 Total Bases and 7 Sacrifice Hits.

In 10 seasons he played in 1,019 Games and had 3,477 At Bats, 450 Runs, 1,010 Hits, 165 Doubles, 51 Triples, 25 Home Runs, 272 RBI, 30 Stolen Bases, 258 Walks, .290 Batting Average, .342 On-base percentage, .389 Slugging Percentage, 1,352 Total Bases, 45 Sacrifice Hits, 10 Sacrifice Flies and 2 Intentional Walks. His career Fielding Percentage was .980 at all three Outfield positions.

Baumholtz had a memorable minor league season in 1950, batting .379 and collecting 254 hits in 172 games for the Los Angeles Angels of the Class AAA Pacific Coast League.

In contrast to radio's "Quiz Kids" or the 1950 Phillies "Whiz Kids", according to Chicago columnist Mike Royko Baumholtz was the anchor, as it were, of a 1950s Cubs outfield "that was so slow they were known as the Quicksand Kids." Hank Sauer and Ralph Kiner were in left and right fields respectively.

Baumholtz is one of 13 athletes to have played in both the National Basketball Association and Major League Baseball. The thirteen are: Danny Ainge, Baumholtz, Hank Biasatti, Gene Conley, Chuck Connors, Dave DeBusschere, Dick Groat, Steve Hamilton, Mark Hendrickson, Cotton Nash, Ron Reed, Dick Ricketts and Howie Schultz.

Baumholtz died in Winter Springs, Florida at the age of 79.

== BAA career statistics ==
Legend
GP	Games played
FG%	Field-goal percentage
FT%	Free-throw percentage
APG	Assists per game
PPG	Points per game

=== Regular season ===
Year	Team	GP	FG%	FT%	APG	PPG
1946–47	Cleveland	45	.298	.776	1.2	14.0
Career		45	.298	.776	1.2	14.0
