= George Nostrand =

American basketball player

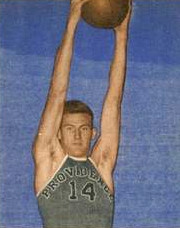
- Nostrand in 1948

Personal information
- Born: January 25, 1924 Uniondale, New York, U.S.
- Died: November 8, 1981 (aged 57)
- Listed height: 6 ft 8 in (2.03 m)
- Listed weight: 195 lb (88 kg)

Career information
- High school: Uniondale (Uniondale, New York)
- College: High Point (1941–1944); Wyoming (1944–1945)
- Playing career: 1946–1950
- Position: Center / power forward
- Number: 16, 11, 9, 14, 6, 3, 18

Career history
- 1946: Toronto Huskies
- 1946–1947: Cleveland Rebels
- 1947–1949: Providence Steamrollers
- 1949: Boston Celtics
- 1949: Tri-Cities Blackhawks
- 1949–1950: Chicago Stags
- Stats at NBA.com
- Stats at Basketball Reference

George Thomas Nostrand (January 25, 1924 – November 8, 1981) was an American professional basketball player.

A 6-foot-8-inch (2.03 m) power forward/center from High Point University (1941–1944) and the University of Wyoming (1944–1945), Nostrand played four seasons (1946–1950) in the National Basketball Association as a member of the Toronto Huskies, Cleveland Rebels, Providence Steamrollers, Boston Celtics, Tri-Cities Blackhawks, and Chicago Stags. He averaged 8.2 points per game in his professional career.

Nostrand is perhaps best known for appearing in a series of Canadian newspaper advertisements to promote the first National Basketball Association game, a November 1, 1946 contest between Nostrand's Toronto Huskies and the New York Knicks. The advertisements promised that anyone taller than Nostrand would receive free admission to the opening game.

== BAA/NBA career statistics ==
Legend
GP	Games played	FG%	Field-goal percentage
FT%	Free-throw percentage	APG	Assists per game
PPG	Points per game	**Bold**	Career high

=== Regular season ===
Year	Team	GP	FG%	FT%	APG	PPG
1946–47	Toronto	13	.338	.393	.8	8.9
1946–47	Cleveland	**48**	.281	.497	.4	7.6
1947–48	Providence	45	.297	.540	.7	11.6
1948–49	Providence	33	.315	.550	**1.7**	9.8
1948–49	Boston	27	.341	**.615**	1.4	9.8
1949–50	Boston	18	.300	.610	.9	6.0
1949–50	Tri-Cities	1	**.500**	.400	1.0	**12.0**
1949–50	Chicago	36	.296	.514	.3	2.6
Career		221	.305	.538	.8	8.2

=== Playoffs ===
Year	Team	GP	FG%	FT%	APG	PPG
1947	Cleveland	3	.350	.714	1.0	11.0
Career		3	.350	.714	1.0	11.0
