= Cornelius Scranton Bushnell =

American railroad executive and shipbuilder

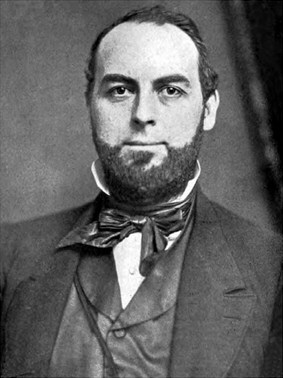
- Born: July 19, 1829; Madison, Connecticut
- Died: May 6, 1896 (aged 66); New York City, New York

Cornelius Scranton Bushnell (July 19, 1829 – May 6, 1896) was an American railroad executive and shipbuilder who was instrumental in developing ironclad ships for the Union Navy during the American Civil War.

== Background ==
Bushnell, the son of Nathan & Chloe (Scranton) Bushnell, was born July 19, 1829, in Madison, Connecticut. At the age of 15, he decided to become a sailor and shipped out on a coastal vessel. Within a year and a half, he was master of a 60-ton schooner. Later, he went into the grocery business with his brother.

== Railroad ==
The bankrupt New Haven and New London Railroad offered new opportunities for him. Working with friends and with his own capital, he invested in the railroad. By 1860, under Bushnell's guidance, it had completed a critical connection with the Providence Road, which completed the connection between New York City and Boston. By 1861, Bushnell had been elected president of the railroad.

== USS Monitor ==
Bushnell was in Washington, D.C., when the Civil War broke out. At that time, he volunteered to defend the capital in a militia unit until regular troops could be moved in. He mustered out on May 4, 1861, after the arrival of the 6th Massachusetts Infantry.

In mid-1861, the Confederates raised and began refitting a 3500-ton frigate, the USS Merrimac, that had been burned to the waterline by the Federals. They began restoring the ship as an ironclad. News of this caused great worry in Washington and the race was on to build Federal ironclads. With S. H. Pook of Boston, a naval expert, Bushnell and other officials soon developed plans for their own ironclad for the U.S. Navy, a vessel later known as the Galena. Out of a concern for the stability of the proposed craft, Bushnell traveled to see Capt. John Ericsson for his analysis and opinion, which he agreed to provide. But Ericsson also had his own plans and a working model of a unique floating battery, a low slung ironclad outfitted with a revolving turret. This novel design was to revolutionize naval warfare. An impressed Bushnell went back to Washington and, within eight days, the new design was approved by Navy officials and the Secretary of the Navy, Gideon Welles. Through Bushnell's efforts, the USS Monitor was rapidly completed and went on to fight the refurbished Merrimac (by then known as the CSS Virginia) at Battle of Hampton Roads, saving the Union fleet of wooden sail

== After the war ==
Following the Civil War, Bushnell returned to the railroad industry, and was one of the organizers of the Union Pacific Railroad.

He died in New York City.

The town of Bushnell, Nebraska is named after him.
