= Roy Clifford =

American basketball coach (1900–1996)

Personal information
- Born: June 14, 1900 Lansing, Michigan, U.S.
- Died: June 12, 1996 (aged 95)

Career history

Coaching
- 1924–1928: Collinwood (HS)
- 1929–1943, 1945–1946: Case Western Reserve
- 1947: Cleveland Rebels

Career highlights
- Case Western Hall of Fame (1981)

Roy Adams Clifford (June 14, 1900 – June 12, 1996) was the second head coach of the Cleveland Rebels.

Clifford grew up in Lansing, Michigan graduating from Western Michigan University, known then as Western State Normal School, in 1924. That September he became the head basketball coach at Collinwood High School in Cleveland, coaching from 1924 to 1928. His 1928 Collinwood team had a perfect, undefeated season of 14–0. Clifford also coached the high school varsity soccer teams during this era.

From 1929 to 1946 Clifford was the head basketball coach at Western Reserve University (now Case Western Reserve University) and was inducted into their hall of fame in 1981.

During the 1946–47 BAA season, Clifford assumed the role as head coach of the Cleveland Rebels on February 12, 1947, after the resignation of Dutch Dehnert. Clifford led the team into the playoffs. The franchise folded after just one season.

== Head coaching record ==
Legend
Regular season	G	Games coached	W	Games won	L	Games lost	W–L %	Win–loss %
Playoffs	PG	Playoff games	PW	Playoff wins	PL	Playoff losses	PW–L %	Playoff win–loss %

=== NBA ===
Team	Year	G	W	L	W–L%	Finish	PG	PW	PL	PW–L%	Result
Cleveland	1946–47	23	13	10	.565	3rd in Western	3	1	2	.333	Lost quarterfinals
