= BAA Indianapolis =

Planned basketball team in Indianapolis

BAA Indianapolis was a planned basketball team in the Basketball Association of America (BAA), a forerunner of the modern National Basketball Association (NBA), based in Indianapolis. They essentially ceased operations before the start of the 1946–47 BAA season, though according to the Association for Professional Basketball Research, the team that would have been established in Indianapolis by the BAA originally ended up becoming the Detroit Falcons to start the inaugural BAA season instead. The Falcons later became one of four inaugural BAA teams to fold operations before the start of the league's second season. Another try by the BAA to create a team in Indianapolis would officially be cancelled by May 10, 1948, following the news of the Indianapolis Kautskys looking to move from the rivaling NBL to the BAA alongside a few other NBL teams. The Kautskys would rebrand themselves into the Indianapolis Jets for one season before folding operations once the Basketball Association of America and the rivaling National Basketball League (NBL) merged to become the modern-day National Basketball Association (NBA), though the Jets would be replaced by the Indianapolis Olympians expansion franchise that was initially planned to play for the NBL before it ended up as a part of the NBA instead. The Olympians would continue operations until 1953 due in part to controversy relating to a few of their players that were involved in a college scandal at the time. The state of Indiana would later have a new team created for a new rivaling league in the American Basketball Association called the Indiana Pacers in 1967, which eventually joined the NBA properly in 1976 and still exist in Indiana to this day.

== See also ==
- Basketball Association of America
- Detroit Falcons
- Indianapolis Jets
- Indianapolis Olympians
- Indiana Pacers
