= Cleveland Arena =

Demolished arena in Cleveland, Ohio, US

- Interactive map of Cleveland Arena
- Location: 3717 Euclid Avenue; Cleveland, Ohio, 44115; United States
- Coordinates: 41°30′14″N 81°39′40″W
- Capacity: 11,000 (basketball); 9,900 (hockey)

Construction
- Opened: November 10, 1937
- Closed: May 19, 1974
- Demolished: 1977
- Cost: $1.5 million ($33.6 million in 2025 dollars)

Tenants
- Cleveland Barons (AHL) (1937–1973); Cleveland White Horses (NBL) (1939); Cleveland Rebels (BAA) (1946–1947); Cincinnati Royals (NBA) (1966–1970); Cleveland Cavaliers (NBA) (1970–1974); Cleveland Crusaders (WHA) (1972–1974)

Cleveland Arena was an arena in Cleveland, Ohio. It was built and privately financed by local businessman Albert C. Sutphin during the height of the Great Depression in 1937 as a playing site for Sutphin's AHL team, the Cleveland Barons. The arena was at 3717 Euclid Avenue, and seated over 10,000 in the stands and over 12,500 for events such as boxing, where floor seating was available.

The area opened on November 10, 1937, with its first presentation being a performance of the Ice Follies of 1938, with its first hockey game opening the following week on November 17, when the Barons faced against the New York Rangers. In addition to the Barons, the arena was also home to the Cleveland Rebels of the Basketball Association of America, also owned by Sutphin, for the 1946–47 season.

The Cleveland Arena was also a regular concert and boxing venue, and six-day bicycle races were held there between 1939 and 1958, moved there from Public Hall.

On October 22, 1943, Lee Savold scored a first round knockout in 1 minute, 2 seconds over Eddie Blunt of New York, before 5,592 at the Cleveland Arena. Savold weighed 195 pounds, 25 less than his opponent.

On March 21, 1952, it was the site of the Moondog Coronation Ball, considered the first rock and roll concert, organized by Alan Freed. The concert was shut down after the first song by fire authorities due to overcrowding. It was estimated 20,000 people were in the arena or trying to enter it, when the capacity was roughly half that.

In 1968, the arena and the Barons were purchased by Nick Mileti. In 1970, the expansion Cleveland Cavaliers of the NBA moved into the arena and played there for their first four seasons, from 1970 to 1974. After the Cavaliers began playing at the arena, it stopped hosting games for the Cincinnati Royals of the National Basketball Association (NBA). The Royals, who also played home games at other Ohio sites, played more than 35 games at the arena between 1966 and 1970.

The Cleveland Crusaders of the new World Hockey Association played at the arena from 1972 to 1974.

Alongside its major sporting events throughout the arena's history, the arena also served as a multi-venue entertainment house, that also hosted major concerts and other performing arts and stage shows. The area also had a medical facility, known as the Arena Clinic. The Arena Clinic primarily provided medical care for visiting athletic teams and other entertainment events, but also served as a walk-in clinic for the community. Its sign can be seen in photographs of the arena.

While the arena was a showpiece when it opened, it did not age well. By the 1970s, it had become decrepit. It also lacked adequate parking. It closed in 1974, with teams moving to the Richfield Coliseum. The arena was demolished in 1977; the headquarters of the Cleveland Chapter of the American Red Cross now occupies the site.

The arena was the last major sporting facility to open within Cleveland's borders prior to 1991, when the Wolstein Center opened at Cleveland State University, and in 1994, when Jacobs Field, now Progressive Field, opened for Major League Baseball's (MLB) Cleveland Indians. Later in 1994, the Cavaliers moved back to Cleveland when they opened the adjacent Gund Arena, now Rocket Arena.

Preceded by first arena	Home of the Cleveland Cavaliers; 1970 – 1974	Succeeded by Richfield Coliseum
Preceded by first arena	Home of the Cleveland Crusaders; 1972 – 1974	Succeeded by Richfield Coliseum
