= Cleveland Rebels =

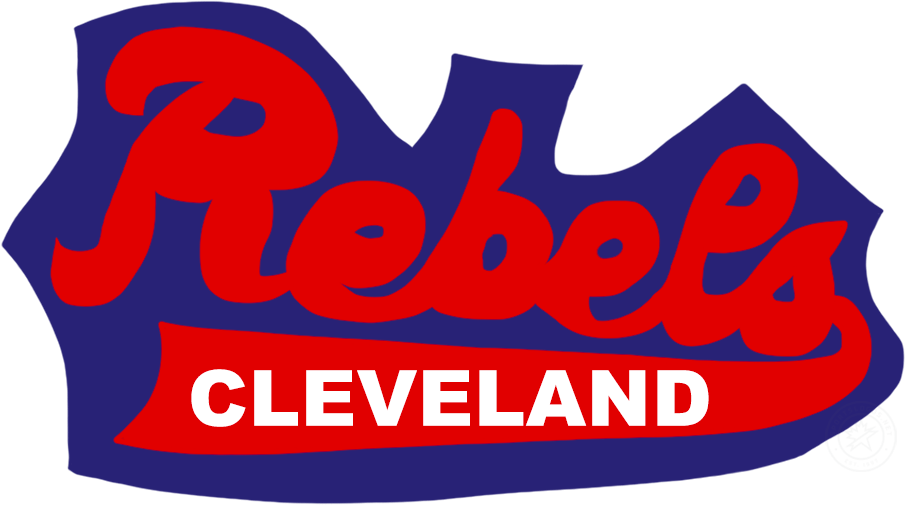
- Division: Western
- Founded: 1946
- Folded: 1947
- History: Cleveland Rebels; 1946–1947
- Arena: Cleveland Arena
- Location: Cleveland, Ohio

The Cleveland Rebels were a basketball team in the Basketball Association of America (BAA), a forerunner of the modern National Basketball Association (NBA), based in Cleveland.

== Franchise history ==
The Rebels were an inaugural franchise in the BAA's first season. In their only season, the team went 30–30, finishing 3rd in the Western Division and losing in the first round of the playoffs, two games to one to the New York Knickerbockers in its one season. However, the team lost money. Team president Al Suphin admitted that the team lost $75,000 while also saying he had a lack of desire to "promote" pro basketball. During the BAA's first meeting after the 1947 BAA Finals, the Rebels franchise declared that they would already not participate in the upcoming season in the BAA as a result of the loss of money and lack of desire to promote professional basketball, effectively forfeiting participation in the 1947 BAA draft. On June 9, 1947, the team announced they would suspend operations and ultimately disbanded; they were the first of four teams to disband, with the Detroit Falcons, Pittsburgh Ironmen, and Toronto Huskies all following in the next two months. The Rebels included notable early pro stars Big Ed Sadowski and Kenny Sailors. Cleveland would not have another team in what would become the NBA until the Cavaliers joined the league in 1970.

Note: W = wins, L = losses, % = win–loss %

Season	W	L	%	Playoffs	Results
Cleveland Rebels (BAA)
1946–47	30	30	.500	Lost First Round	New York 2, Cleveland 1

== All-time roster ==
The following players are the all-time roster of the Cleveland Rebels.

- Frank Baumholtz
- Leon Brown
- Ken Corley
- Ned Endress
- Bob Faught
- Kleggie Hermsen
- Pete Lalich
- Hank Lefkowitz
- Leo Mogus
- George Nostrand
- Mel Riebe
- Irv Rothenberg
- Ed Sadowski
- Kenny Sailors
- Ben Scharnus
- Dick Schulz
- Nick Shaback
- Ray Wertis

== Coaches and others ==
The following two coaches are the only two coaches of the Cleveland Rebels.

- Roy Clifford
- Dutch Dehnert

== See also ==
- List of defunct National Basketball Association teams
