= Albert C. Sutphin =

Albert C. Sutphin, also known as Al Sutphin and "the man in the red necktie", (April 11,1894–June 25, 1974) was a sports promoter and businessman in Cleveland, Ohio. His name is closely connected with the Cleveland Arena, the Ice Capades, and minor-league ice hockey. He was president of the Braden-Sutphin Ink Co. which produces graphic arts equipment, inks, printing materials and supplies.

Sutphin was born in Franklin, Ohio and moved to Cleveland as a teenager. He played hockey for his high school team, later playing semi-professional baseball and football. He was Cleveland's boxing commissioner in the early 1930s.

== Sports promotion ==
In 1934 Sutphin bought the faltering Cleveland Indians hockey team. As its new owner, president, and treasurer, he renamed the team the Cleveland Falcons; it soon became a charter member of the fledgling American Hockey League. Two years later he organized a team of investors to build the Cleveland Arena. After conducting a public contest for suggestions, he renamed the team the Cleveland Barons. They were the Arena's prime tenant, but Sutphin heavily promoted it as the site for a variety of indoor events such as ice shows, rodeos, basketball from the high school through professional levels, track meets, and boxing matches. He sold the Arena and the team in 1949, but continued to support Cleveland sports until the end of his life. In February 1940, Al Sutphin and eight other arena managers organized the Ice Capades.
