= BAA Buffalo =

Planned basketball team in Buffalo

BAA Buffalo was a planned basketball team in the Basketball Association of America (BAA), a forerunner of the modern National Basketball Association (NBA), based in Buffalo, New York. The franchise, which was granted on June 6, 1946, never played a game and was officially cancelled by the BAA on May 10, 1948, though not before the franchise was given a vote by the league to have an expansion franchise properly granted to it by what would have been the new team's owner, John D. Herring. The BAA Buffalo franchise would be one of five planned franchises to ultimately be declined entry into the BAA alongside the rivaling National Basketball League's Oshkosh All-Stars and Toledo Jeeps and what would have been planned expansion franchises out in Louisville, Kentucky and Wilkes-Barre, Pennsylvania. Buffalo would eventually have a new franchise in what would become the BAA's spiritual successor, the National Basketball Association, with the Buffalo Braves being created in 1970, though they would move to San Diego in 1978 to become the San Diego Clippers (now known as the Los Angeles Clippers).

== See also ==
- Basketball Association of America
