= 1946–47 BAA season =

First NBA season

- League: Basketball Association of America
- Sport: Basketball
- Duration: November 1, 1946 – March 31, 1947; April 2–14, 1947 (Playoffs); April 16–22, 1947 (Finals)
- Games: 60-61
- Teams: 11

Regular season
- Top seed: Washington Capitols
- Top scorer: Joe Fulks (Philadelphia)

Playoffs
- Eastern champions: Philadelphia Warriors (Note: The 1947 BAA Playoffs did not generate Eastern and Western champions and runners-up, as NBA Playoffs have done from 1951 to present. Eastern and Western leaders, or perhaps champions, Washington and Chicago played off to determine one finalist while four runners-up played off to determine the other finalist. The listed teams were BAA playoff finalists and semifinalists, as Eastern and Western champions and runners-up in the NBA have been playoff finalists and semifinalists from 1951 to present.)
- Eastern runners-up: New York Knicks
- Western champions: Chicago Stags (Note: Chicago may reasonably be called Eastern champion.)
- Western runners-up: Washington Capitols

Finals
- Champions: Philadelphia Warriors
- Runners-up: Chicago Stags

BAA/NBA seasons
- 1947–48 →

The 1946–47 BAA season was the inaugural season of the Basketball Association of America. The league launched with 11 teams playing a 60-game schedule. The postseason tournament (the 1947 BAA Playoffs) at its conclusion, ended with the Philadelphia Warriors becoming the first BAA champion, beating the Chicago Stags 4 games to 1 in the BAA Finals.

Following its third, the 1948–49 season, the BAA and National Basketball League merged to create the National Basketball Association or NBA. The NBA recognizes the three BAA seasons as part of its own history, sometimes without comment, so the 1946–47 BAA season is sometimes considered the first NBA season.

By 1951, only three original BAA teams were still in the NBA: the Boston Celtics, New York Knicks and Philadelphia Warriors (now in San Francisco as the Golden State Warriors). Meanwhile, every single member of the inaugural Western Division had folded operations by 1950, with three of these teams lasting for only one season (Cleveland Rebels, Detroit Falcons, and Pittsburgh Ironmen) in the inaugural BAA season. Not only that, but the Toronto Huskies also folded operations following the season's conclusion as well (with them and Pittsburgh folding after the inaugural 1947 BAA draft concluded), which made for a total of four teams folding operations before the BAA's second season began.

== Notable events ==
- Before the inaugural BAA season began, the newly-created league had intended for 13 teams to join in the league with the original eleven that had been created alongside planned teams being added in Buffalo and Indianapolis. However, both of those teams had ultimately dropped out of entry before entering the BAA's inaugural season properly, as while Buffalo's entry was supposedly never truly considered a serious one by the representatives of that team at the time (likely due in part to them recognizing that they would also have to compete against a newly-created National Basketball League team in the Buffalo Bisons at the time), Indianapolis' withdrawal was brought up to the BAA due to serious concerns about them competing against three different professional basketball teams with the rivaling National Basketball League that all were in the state of Indiana with the Fort Wayne Zollner Pistons, the Indianapolis Kautskys, and the newly-added Anderson Duffey Packers combined with venue issues at hand. (Supposedly, the Indianapolis squad would end up moving their operations to Detroit to become the Detroit Falcons, though that isn't 100% confirmed information.)
- On November 1, 1946, in the inaugural game of the new league, the New York Knicks beat the Toronto Huskies 68–66 in front of 7,090 spectators at Maple Leaf Gardens in Toronto. Ossie Schectman scored the opening basket for the New York Knicks against Toronto. In 1949, the BAA helped create the National Basketball Association by merger, and Schectman's shot may be considered the first basket in NBA history. The NBA recognizes the three BAA seasons as part of its own history, sometimes without comment.
- On November 2, the Detroit Falcons would lose their regular season debut at home through a 50–33 defeat to the Washington Capitols. The 33 points scored that night would not only be the lowest amount of points scored in a BAA/NBA regular season debut game (with the only other team to score under 40 points at all this season ironically being the Washington Capitols on January 16, 1947 against the Boston Celtics), but it also was the league's record for the lowest amount of points scored in a single game until November 22, 1950 with a 19–18 final score for an NBA match.
- On November 5, the first recorded instance of a broken backboard would occur before the inaugural home game between the Chicago Stags and the Boston Celtics at the Boston Arena began due to Chuck Connors damaging their backboard that hosted the basketball hoop from a faraway practice shot that he attempted to do (and not a slam dunk since most players from this era were not athletic enough to even attempt such a feat, never mind it not even being considered a legal move for basketball at the time), with the tenants taking an extra hour to get a spare basketball hoop and backboard from the nearby Boston Garden due to it hosting a rodeo show at the time. That match would end with the Stags winning with a 57–55 final score.
- On November 7, the Pittsburgh Ironmen would see five of their players fouling out of the game back when players fouling out involved a maximum amount of five fouls instead of the usual six fouls seen in the present-day era, which led to both the Ironmen and the Philadelphia Warriors finishing the game under an unusual four-on-four setting instead due to Ironmen head coach Paul Birch refusing the Warriors' offer to reinstate one of Pittsburgh's own players back into the game for a proper five-on-five setting (though with the caveat of technical fouls being assessed for any of the players that were already over the foul limit at that time); that match later ended with an 81–75 home victory for the Warriors.
- On November 11, the New York Knicks would host their first home game of the season against the Chicago Stags. While the game would go into overtime, the Knicks would lose to the Stags in a messy 78–68 defeat by the overtime period. Interestingly, unbeknownst to everyone in the Madison Square Garden that night, one of the attendees would later become an infamous figure in early basketball history, as future NBA All-Star, point-shaver, and eventual gangster Jack Molinas would attend that game with some of his friends as a part of the paying audience that night.
- On December 11, the BAA decided to experiment with having a 60-minute game played with 15-minute quarters played in a match between the Cleveland Rebels and the Chicago Stags, with the foul limit being expanded from five to six fouls for this match. The match ended with Chicago winning 88–79. However, the experiment of longer games would only last for two more games following that match (with the Detroit Falcons being the only other team that felt interested in the experiment alongside the Chicago Stags) before scrapping the 60 minute game experiment for good.
- On January 1, 1947, the BAA would see their first ever game where a team would score over 100 points in a match, with the St. Louis Bombers recording 103 points in a victory over the Chicago Stags. That feat would only happen nine total times throughout the season, with the Chicago Stags doing it the most times in four different match-ups and the Philadelphia Warriors being the only surviving BAA/NBA team to the present day to record any at all with two match-ups of their own.
- On January 11, after the BAA allowed for zone defenses to be used in their league, the BAA would outlaw the usage of zone defenses entirely, much to the chagrin of the Pittsburgh Ironmen and head coach Paul Birch.
- After the end of the inaugural regular season the BAA had, both the Chicago Stags and St. Louis Bombers originally finished up the season by being tied for first place in the Western Division with a 38–22 record. Because the two teams ended the regular season with a tied record for the best record in their division, the BAA decided in a somewhat impromptu manner to add in a 61st regular season game for the Stags and Bombers on March 31 (with Chicago being the home team) in order to determine which of the two teams would be named the best team in the Western Division this season. That newly implemented final game of the regular season would end in a 73–66 overtime victory for the Stags, thus cementing them as the best team in the Western Division this season to coincide with the Washington Capitols being the best team of the Eastern Division this season through a runaway 49–11 record.

Coaching changes
In-season
Team	Outgoing coach	Incoming coach
Cleveland Rebels	Dutch Dehnert	Roy Clifford
Detroit Falcons	Glenn M. Curtis	Philip Sachs
Toronto Huskies	Ed Sadowski; Lew Hayman (interim); Dick Fitzgerald (interim)	Lew Hayman (interim); Dick Fitzgerald (interim); Red Rolfe

== Final standings ==
#	Eastern Division				
#	Team	W	L	PCT	GB
1	x-Washington Capitols	49	11	.817	–
2	x-Philadelphia Warriors	35	25	.583	14
3	x-New York Knicks	33	27	.550	16
4	Providence Steamrollers	28	32	.467	21
5	Boston Celtics	22	38	.367	27
6	Toronto Huskies	22	38	.367	27

#	Western Division				
#	Team	W	L	PCT	GB
1	x-Chicago Stags	39	22	.639	–
2	x-St. Louis Bombers	38	23	.623	1
3	x-Cleveland Rebels	30	30	.500	8.5
4	Detroit Falcons	20	40	.333	18.5
5	Pittsburgh Ironmen	15	45	.250	23.5

== Playoffs ==
There were no byes. Western and Eastern champions Chicago and Washington immediately played a long semifinal series with Washington having home-court advantage. Chicago won the sixth game in Washington one day before Philadelphia concluded its two short series with other runners-up.

First Round
E3	New York	2
W3	Cleveland	1
W2	St. Louis	1
E2	Philadelphia	2

BAA Semifinals
W1	Chicago*	4
E1	Washington*	2
E3	New York	0
E2	Philadelphia	2

BAA Finals
W1	Chicago*	1
E2	Philadelphia	4

- * Division winner
- Bold Series winner

== Statistics leaders ==
Category	Player	Team	Stat
Points	Joe Fulks	Philadelphia Warriors	1,389
Assists	Ernie Calverley	Providence Steamrollers	202
FG%	Bob Feerick	Washington Capitols	.401
FT%	Fred Scolari	Washington Capitols	.811

Note: Prior to the 1969–70 season, league leaders in points and assists were determined by totals rather than averages.

== BAA awards ==
- All-BAA First Team
  - G Max Zaslofsky, Chicago Stags
  - F Bones McKinney, Washington Capitols
  - F Joe Fulks, Philadelphia Warriors
  - C Stan Miasek, Detroit Falcons
  - F Bob Feerick, Washington Capitols
- All-BAA Second Team
  - G John Logan, St. Louis Bombers
  - G Ernie Calverley, Providence Steamrollers
  - C Chick Halbert, Chicago Stags
  - G Frankie Baumholtz, Cleveland Rebels
  - G Fred Scolari, Washington Capitols

== See also ==
- List of NBA regular season records
- 1946–47 NBL season, the rivaling season of what would eventually be their merging partner to form the National Basketball Association in the older National Basketball League within the U.S.A. from 1937 until 1949

== External references ==
- Rosen, Charley (2008). The First Tip-Off: The Incredible Story of the Birth of the NBA. McGraw Hill. ISBN 9780071487856. This book is dedicated to detailing the 1946–47 season out, including the first meeting that the BAA had when establishing operations, the trials and tribulations each team had during their first season of operations, and what caused commissioner Maurice Podoloff to claim this season was a good one publicly at the time, only to later admit that it was a complete failure to the point where desperate changes had to be made for the league to survive years later.
