= Basketball Association of America =

North American basketball league

- Sport: Basketball
- Founded: June 6, 1946; 80 years ago
- First season: 1946–47
- Folded: August 3, 1949; 77 years ago (merged with NBL to form NBA)
- No. of teams: 16
- Countries: United States and Canada
- Last champions: Minneapolis Lakers (1st title)

The Basketball Association of America (BAA) was a professional basketball league in North America, founded in 1946 by team owners from the National Hockey League (NHL) and American Hockey League (AHL) at the time. Following its third season, the 1948–49 BAA season, the BAA merged with the National Basketball League (NBL) to form the National Basketball Association (NBA).

The Philadelphia Warriors won the inaugural BAA championship in 1947, followed by the Baltimore Bullets and the Minneapolis Lakers in 1948 and 1949, respectively. Six teams from the BAA remain in operation in the NBA as of the 2024–25 season: three that co-founded the league in 1946 (Boston Celtics, New York Knicks, and Philadelphia Warriors) and three that joined it from the NBL in 1948 (Fort Wayne Pistons, Minneapolis Lakers, and Rochester Royals). The inaugural BAA season began with 11 teams, of which four dropped out before the second season. One team joined from the American Basketball League (ABL) to provide 8 teams for 1947–48 and four NBL teams joined to provide 12 for 1948–49. The records and statistics of the BAA and NBL prior to the merger in 1949 are considered in official NBA history only if a player, coach or team participated in the newly formed NBA after 1949 for one or more seasons.

The NBA generally claims the BAA's history as its own. For example, at NBA History online, its table of one-line "NBA Season Recaps" begins 1946–47 without comment. It also celebrated "NBA at 50" in 1996, with the announcement of its 50 Greatest Players, among other things.

== History ==
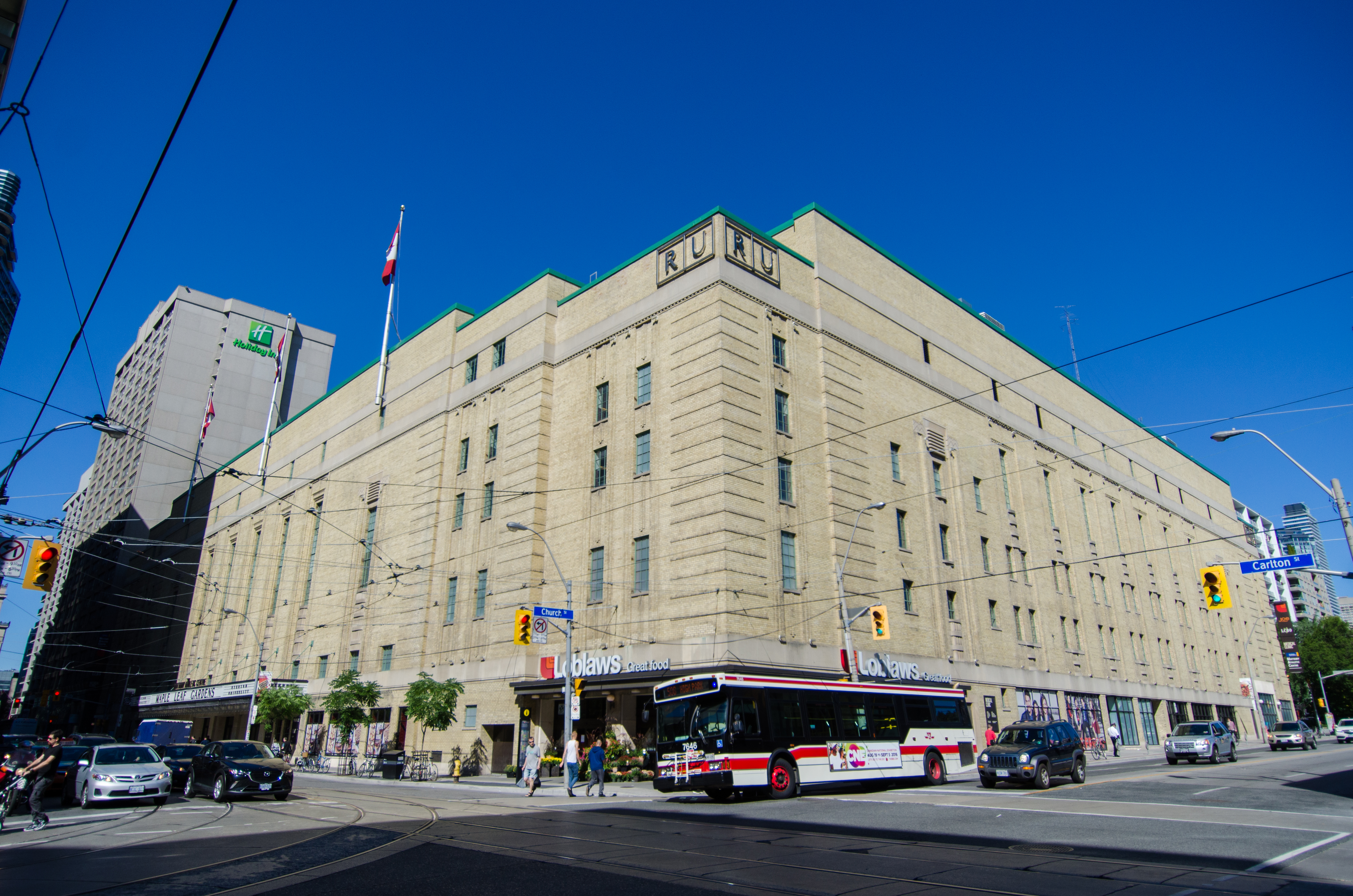
Maple Leaf Gardens in Toronto hosted the first BAA game.

When the BAA was founded, there were two established professional leagues in the United States: the American Basketball League (ABL) in the East, founded in 1925 and revived in 1933 after briefly going on hiatus in 1931, and the National Basketball League (NBL) in Midwestern industrial cities, founded in 1937. However, most of the ABL and NBL teams played in small arenas, and in some cases even ballrooms or high school gymnasiums. Walter Brown, owner of the Boston Garden, believed that major ice hockey arenas, which sat empty on many nights, could be put to profitable use hosting basketball games when there were no ice hockey games to be played. To put this theory into practice, the BAA was founded at the Commodore Hotel in New York City on June 6, 1946. The remaining founding members were represented by: Madison Square Garden sports promoter Ned Irish; Philadelphia Arena sports promoter Peter Tyrell; Uline Arena owner Mike Uline; Arthur Wirtz, owner of Chicago Stadium and St. Louis Arena; Detroit Olympia owner James D. Norris; Cleveland Arena sports promoter Albert C. Sutphin; Maple Leaf Gardens managing director Frank Selke; Duquesne Gardens entertainment executive John Harris; and Rhode Island Auditorium owner Louis Pieri. The already-serving president of the American Hockey League (AHL) Maurice Podoloff was appointed president of the BAA, becoming the first person to simultaneously lead two professional leagues—Joseph Carr had been president of the ABL from 1925 to 1928 while also overseeing the National Football League (NFL), but the NFL and ABL seasons did not overlap. Additionally, two other representatives that were intended to represent inaugural BAA teams in Buffalo and Indianapolis in James Allinger and Dick Miller (who represented their highest possible positions for the home venues of the Buffalo Memorial Auditorium and the Indiana State Fairgrounds Coliseum respectively) were also present at the founding meeting to discuss everything regarding the actual league's existence (including a potential name change), but Allinger confirmed he had no real plans to host a team in Buffalo for at least the BAA's inaugural season and Miller felt compelled to fold his team before even playing a single game near the end of the meeting due to a combination of fierce competition of professional teams already in the state of Indiana by this time thanks to the number of teams already previously established in the NBL (including a threat of one of those teams potentially moving into the BAA later on), pricing issues for acquiring players, and not having the necessary wood for a portable basketball court at the Indiana State Fairgrounds Coliseum. This later led to the BAA suspending operations for those two teams for a year before folding them completely without them playing a single game in the league.

The owners of the BAA, while experienced businessmen, had little experience owning basketball teams. The league started with 11 teams, which played a 60-game regular season. This was followed by the playoffs and the final series to determine the league winner. Nevertheless, its goal was to operate under a different manner from previous professional basketball leagues before this point in time with four key concepts in mind: each team being arena-owned (i.e., being its own landlord), emphasizing the college players (who worked under a more "clean" and open concept of basketball) over the old pros of the time (who were rougher by comparison, with some previously competing in the sport with cages sealing the court up), a hockey-schedule format similar to what the NHL held that emphasized postseason playoff series matches from the start over elimination tournaments (or even split season formats) for postseason championships, and having a conscious effort being made at unified, league-entity promotion.

Although there had been earlier attempts at professional basketball leagues, including the American Basketball League (ABL) and the NBL, the BAA was the first league that attempted to play primarily in large arenas in major cities, such as the Madison Square Garden and the Boston Garden. At its inception, the quality of play in the BAA was not significantly better than in competing leagues, or among leading independent clubs such as the Harlem Globetrotters. For instance, both the 1948 and 1949 titles were won by teams that had played in other leagues during the previous year, the Baltimore Bullets from the American Basketball League in 1948 and the Minneapolis Lakers from the National Basketball League in 1949.

=== 1946–47 season ===
The league started with 11 teams, which were divided into two divisions, the Eastern Division and the Western Division. Each team played 60 or 61 regular season games. The best three teams from each division advanced to the playoffs. The two division winners received first-round byes and qualified directly to the semifinals, while the two second-place teams and two third-place teams competed in the best-of-3 quarterfinals, followed by the semifinals. The final series was also played in a best-of-7 format.

On November 1, 1946, at Maple Leaf Gardens in Toronto, the Toronto Huskies hosted the New York Knickerbockers, which the NBA now regards as the league's first official game. In the opening game of the BAA, Ossie Schectman scored the opening basket for the Knickerbockers. The Eastern Division winner, the Washington Capitols, who had the best record with 49 wins, were defeated in the best-of-7 semifinal by the Western Division winner, the Chicago Stags. The Stags advanced to the finals along with the Philadelphia Warriors who defeated the New York Knickerbockers in the other semifinal. The Warriors won the inaugural BAA championship by winning the series 4–1, though it came with the two teams swapping around who got home court advantage due to their home venue hosting a circus at the time.

The first year had many problems. In arenas shared with hockey teams, some arena owners simply put a wooden basketball floor over the ice. This caused some games to be cancelled due to puddles on the floor. In addition, some owners would not heat their buildings, leading fans to bring blankets to the games and players to wear gloves. Attendance averaged just 3,000 per game. Teams with large leads would stall by having players dribble the ball for long periods. The owners discussed trying a 60-minute game and even doing "innings" where each team would have the ball for a certain period of time. In addition, the teams in the league were financially weak. However, the BAA still had fans eager to see former college stars play.

From the beginning, the league aspired to be a major league. The league also differed from its rival, the NBL: the BAA played a 48-minute game instead of a 40-minute game, and allowed players to play until they committed six fouls as opposed to five. The league formation did not alarm team owners in the NBL until some NBL players switched to the BAA.

=== 1947–48 season ===
Before the season started, the Cleveland Rebels, Detroit Falcons, Pittsburgh Ironmen and Toronto Huskies folded, leaving the BAA with only seven teams. The Baltimore Bullets joined the league from the ABL, and were assigned to the Western Division along with the Washington Capitols to even the divisions. Prior to the start of the season, the league held its inaugural college draft on July 1, 1947. Each team played 48 regular season games. The Eastern Division was won by the Philadelphia Warriors, the West by the St. Louis Bombers.

The 1948 Playoffs followed the same format as the previous year. The Eastern Division winner, the Philadelphia Warriors defeated the Western Division winner, St. Louis Bombers. In the finals, the Warriors were defeated by the Bullets 4–2.

=== 1948–49 season ===
Prior to the start of the season, four teams from the NBL, the Fort Wayne Pistons, Indianapolis Jets, Minneapolis Lakers and the Rochester Royals, joined the BAA. This caused a surge in talent as players such as George Mikan were now playing in the BAA. With twelve teams, the league was realigned into two six-team divisions. Each team played 60 regular season games. The Eastern Division was won by the Washington Capitols who had 38 wins, while the Western Division was dominated by the two new teams, the Royals and the Lakers who had 45 and 44 wins respectively.

The 1949 playoffs were expanded to include eight teams. The four best teams from each division contested in divisional semifinals and divisional finals to find each division winners. The two division winners then advanced to the BAA Finals. The divisional semifinals and finals were played in a best-of-3 format while the final series were played in the best-of-7 format. The Lakers defeated the Royals to become the inaugural Western Division winner. In the other divisional final, the Capitols defeated the New York Knicks to become the inaugural Eastern Division winner. The Lakers then won the finals by defeating the Capitols 4–2.

=== Merger with NBL, formation of the NBA ===
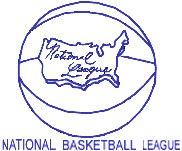
The older National Basketball League would merge operations with the Basketball Association of America on August 3, 1949 to create the National Basketball Association.

On August 3, 1949, the BAA agreed to merge with the NBL, creating the National Basketball Association (NBA). Seven NBL teams, including the expansion team Indianapolis Olympians, joined with the ten BAA teams; the Indianapolis Jets and the Providence Steamrollers folded prior to the merger. In total, the new league had 17 teams located in a mix of large and small cities, as well as large arenas, smaller gymnasiums, and armories. Prior to the merger, the BAA held their 1949 college draft on March 21, which was the last event officially held under the BAA name.

The NBA later adopted the BAA's history and statistics as its own, but they did not do the same for the NBL records and statistics.

== League championships ==
| **Bold** | Winning team of the BAA Finals |
| Italics | Team with home-court advantage |

| Year | Western champion | Coach | Result | Eastern champion | Coach | Ref |
|---|---|---|---|---|---|---|
| 1947 | Chicago Stags | Harold Olsen | 1–4 | **Philadelphia Warriors** | Eddie Gottlieb | |
| 1948 | **Baltimore Bullets** | Buddy Jeannette | 4–2 | Philadelphia Warriors | Eddie Gottlieb | |
| 1949 | **Minneapolis Lakers** | John Kundla | 4–2 | Washington Capitols | Red Auerbach | |

== Teams ==
| ^ | Denotes a franchise that is currently active, present day NBA |

| Team | City | Years active | Seasons played | Win–loss record | Win pct. | Playoff seasons | Champion seasons | Ref. |
|---|---|---|---|---|---|---|---|---|
| BAA Buffalo | Buffalo, New York | Never Played | 0 | 0–0 | N/A | 0 | 0 | |
| BAA Indianapolis | Indianapolis, Indiana | Never Played | 0 | 0–0 | N/A | 0 | 0 | |
| Baltimore Bullets^{[a]} | Baltimore, Maryland | 1947–49 | 2 | 57–51 | .528 | 2 | 1 | |
| Boston Celtics^ | Boston, Massachusetts | 1946–49 | 3 | 67–101 | .399 | 1 | 0 | |
| Chicago Stags | Chicago, Illinois | 1946–49 | 3 | 105–64 | .621 | 3 | 0 | |
| Cleveland Rebels | Cleveland, Ohio | 1946–47 | 1 | 30–30 | .500 | 1 | 0 | |
| Detroit Falcons | Detroit, Michigan | 1946–47 | 1 | 20–40 | .333 | 0 | 0 | |
| Fort Wayne Pistons^^{[b]} | Fort Wayne, Indiana | 1948–49 | 1 | 22–38 | .367 | 0 | 0 | |
| Indianapolis Jets^{[g]} | Indianapolis, Indiana | 1948–49 | 1 | 18–42 | .300 | 0 | 0 | |
| Minneapolis Lakers^^{[c]} | Minneapolis, Minnesota | 1948–49 | 1 | 44–16 | .733 | 1 | 1 | |
| New York Knickerbockers^ | New York City, New York | 1946–49 | 3 | 91–77 | .542 | 3 | 0 | |
| Philadelphia Warriors^^{[d]} | Philadelphia, Pennsylvania | 1946–49 | 3 | 90–78 | .536 | 3 | 1 | |
| Pittsburgh Ironmen | Pittsburgh, Pennsylvania | 1946–47 | 1 | 15–45 | .250 | 0 | 0 | |
| Providence Steamrollers | Providence, Rhode Island | 1946–49 | 3 | 46–122 | .274 | 0 | 0 | |
| Rochester Royals^^{[e]} | Rochester, New York | 1948–49 | 1 | 45–15 | .750 | 1 | 0 | |
| St. Louis Bombers | St. Louis, Missouri | 1946–49 | 3 | 96–73 | .568 | 3 | 0 | |
| Toronto Huskies | Toronto, Ontario | 1946–47 | 1 | 22–38 | .367 | 0 | 0 | |
| Washington Capitols^{[f]} | Washington, D.C. | 1946–49 | 3 | 115–53 | .685 | 3 | 0 | |

- **^{a}** Not affiliated with the present-day Washington Wizards, which were known as the Baltimore Bullets from 1963 to 1973, Baltimore moved from the ABL to the BAA in 1947.
- **^{b}** Known as the Detroit Pistons since 1957, Fort Wayne moved from the NBL to the BAA in 1948.
- **^{c}** Known as the Los Angeles Lakers since 1960, Minneapolis moved from the NBL to the BAA in 1948.
- **^{d}** Known as the Golden State Warriors since 1971, Philadelphia relocated to San Francisco in 1962.
- **^{e}** Known as the Sacramento Kings since 1985, Rochester moved from the NBL to the BAA in 1948 (and relocated three times).
- **^{f}** Not affiliated with National Hockey League Washington Capitals
- **^{g}** Indianapolis moved from the NBL to the BAA in 1948, along with three other teams that remain in operation.

== Annual standings ==
=== 1946–47 ===
Eastern Division

| Team | W | L | Pct. | GB |
|---|---|---|---|---|
| Washington Capitols | 49 | 11 | .817 | – |
| Philadelphia Warriors | 35 | 25 | .583 | 14 |
| New York Knicks | 33 | 27 | .550 | 16 |
| Providence Steamrollers | 28 | 32 | .467 | 21 |
| Boston Celtics | 22 | 38 | .367 | 27 |
| Toronto Huskies | 22 | 38 | .367 | 27 |

Western Division

| Team | W | L | Pct. | GB |
|---|---|---|---|---|
| Chicago Stags | 39 | 22 | .639 | – |
| St. Louis Bombers | 38 | 23 | .623 | 1 |
| Cleveland Rebels | 30 | 30 | .500 | 8½ |
| Detroit Falcons | 20 | 40 | .333 | 18½ |
| Pittsburgh Ironmen | 15 | 45 | .250 | 23½ |

=== 1947–48 ===
Eastern Division

| Team | W | L | Pct. | GB |
|---|---|---|---|---|
| Philadelphia Warriors | 27 | 21 | .563 | – |
| New York Knicks | 26 | 22 | .542 | 1 |
| Boston Celtics | 20 | 28 | .417 | 7 |
| Providence Steamrollers | 6 | 42 | .125 | 21 |

Western Division

| Team | W | L | Pct. | GB |
|---|---|---|---|---|
| St. Louis Bombers | 29 | 19 | .604 | – |
| Baltimore Bullets | 28 | 20 | .583 | 1 |
| Chicago Stags | 28 | 20 | .583 | 1 |
| Washington Capitols | 28 | 20 | .583 | 1 |

=== 1948–49 ===
Eastern Division

| Team | W | L | Pct. | GB |
|---|---|---|---|---|
| Washington Capitols | 38 | 22 | .633 | – |
| New York Knicks | 32 | 28 | .533 | 6 |
| Baltimore Bullets | 29 | 31 | .483 | 9 |
| Philadelphia Warriors | 28 | 32 | .467 | 10 |
| Boston Celtics | 25 | 35 | .417 | 13 |
| Providence Steamrollers | 12 | 48 | .200 | 26 |

Western Division

| Team | W | L | Pct. | GB |
|---|---|---|---|---|
| Rochester Royals | 45 | 15 | .750 | – |
| Minneapolis Lakers | 44 | 16 | .733 | 1 |
| Chicago Stags | 38 | 22 | .633 | 7 |
| St. Louis Bombers | 29 | 31 | .483 | 16 |
| Fort Wayne Pistons | 22 | 38 | .367 | 23 |
| Indianapolis Jets | 18 | 42 | .300 | 27 |

== Awards ==
The All-BAA Team was an annual BAA honor bestowed on the best players in the league following every season. The All-BAA Team was composed of two five-man lineups—a first and second team, comprising a total of 10 roster spots. The players were selected without regard to position.

| * | Denotes a Hall of Fame player |
| Player (X) | Denotes the number of times the player has been selected |

All-BAA Team
| Season | First team | | Second team | |
| Season | Players | Teams | Players | Teams |
|---|---|---|---|---|
| 1946–47 | Joe Fulks* | Philadelphia Warriors | Ernie Calverley | Providence Steamrollers |
| 1946–47 | Bob Feerick | Washington Capitols | Frank Baumholtz | Cleveland Rebels |
| 1946–47 | Stan Miasek | Detroit Falcons | Johnny Logan | St. Louis Bombers |
| 1946–47 | Bones McKinney | Washington Capitols | Chick Halbert | Chicago Stags |
| 1946–47 | Max Zaslofsky | Chicago Stags | Fred Scolari | Washington Capitols |
| 1947–48 | Joe Fulks* (2) | Philadelphia Warriors | Johnny Logan (2) | St. Louis Bombers |
| 1947–48 | Max Zaslofsky (2) | Chicago Stags | Carl Braun | New York Knicks |
| 1947–48 | Ed Sadowski | Boston Celtics | Stan Miasek (2) | Chicago Stags |
| 1947–48 | Howie Dallmar | Philadelphia Warriors | Fred Scolari (2) | Washington Capitols |
| 1947–48 | Bob Feerick (2) | Washington Capitols | Buddy Jeannette* | Baltimore Bullets |
| 1948–49 | George Mikan* | Minneapolis Lakers | Arnie Risen* | Rochester Royals |
| 1948–49 | Joe Fulks* (3) | Philadelphia Warriors | Bob Feerick (3) | Washington Capitols |
| 1948–49 | Bob Davies* | Rochester Royals | Bones McKinney | Washington Capitols |
| 1948–49 | Max Zaslofsky (3) | Chicago Stags | Ken Sailors | Providence Steamrollers |
| 1948–49 | Jim Pollard* | Minneapolis Lakers | Johnny Logan (3) | St. Louis Bombers |
