= List of University of Rhode Island people =

The following is a partial list of notable University of Rhode Island people. It includes alumni, professors, and others associated with the University of Rhode Island.

== Notable alumni ==
=== Politics and government ===
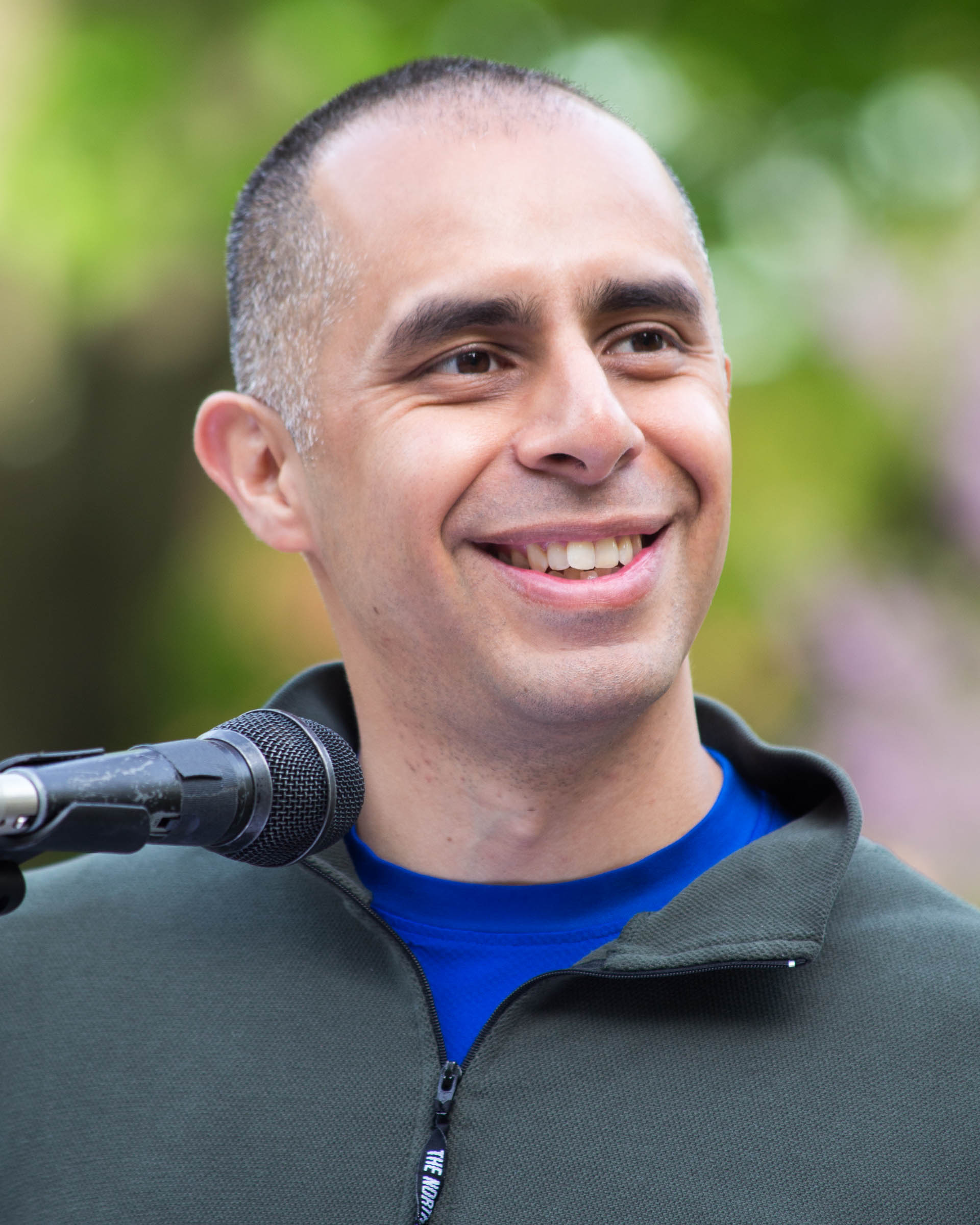
Jorge Elorza

- Lincoln Almond (B.Sc. 1959) – governor of Rhode Island 1995–2003
- Sandra Cano (M.P.A. 2012) – member of the Rhode Island Senate from the 8th district
- Peter Courtney (B.A. 1965) – 55th president of the Oregon State Senate (2003–present), member of the Oregon Senate (1991–present)
- Frank Edelblut (B.Sc. 1983) – commissioner of the New Hampshire Department of Education
- Jorge Elorza (B.Sc. 1998) – 38th mayor of Providence, Rhode Island
- Charles J. Fogarty (M.P.A. 1980) – lieutenant governor of Rhode Island 1999–2006
- J. Joseph Garrahy (1953) – governor of Rhode Island 1977–1985
- William B. Gould IV (B.A. 1958) – chairman of the National Labor Relations Board 1994–1998
- Candace Owens - attended, did not graduate
- Edwin R. Pacheco (B.A. 2005) – chairman of Rhode Island Democratic Party 2010–2013
- Donna M. Walsh – former Rhode Island state representative
- Robert Weygand (B.Sc., B.F.A., M.A, M.P.A.) – lieutenant governor of RI 1993–1997, U.S. representative from RI 1997–2001
- George Wiley (1953) – civil rights leader and chemist

=== Arts, broadcast and entertainment ===
- Masta Ace (1988) – rapper
- Stevie Aiello – songwriter and musician
- Kim Alexis – model
- Christiane Amanpour (B.A. 1983) – journalist and CNN correspondent
- Mark Atkinson (B.A.) – actor
- Andrew Burnap (B.F.A. 2013) – actor
- Steve Cascione (B.A. 1977) – television news anchor
- Angelo Cataldi (B.A. 1972) – sports radio personality
- Amanda Clayton – actress
- Vladimir Duthiers (B.A. 1991) – journalist
- Benjamin Fine (B.Sc. 1928) – journalist
- Mat Franco (2010) – magician
- Sage Francis (1999) – rapper
- Peter Frechette (B.F.A.) – actor
- Matt Gallant (B.A. 1987) – television host
- John M. Geddes (B.A. 1974) – journalist and managing editor of The New York Times 2003–2013
- Leila Goldkuhl – model
- Jose B. Gonzalez (Ph.D. 1998) – poet
- Donald M. Grant (1949) – publisher
- Ann Hood (B.A. 1978) – novelist
- John King (B.A. 1985) – television journalist
- Kevin Kelly – magazine editor
- J. Michael Lennon (M.A. 1969, Ph.D. 1975) – writer and editor
- Aria Mia Loberti – actress
- Tony Longo – actor
- Theo Martins (2009) – singer and rapper
- Freddie Scott – singer
- Michael P. Shawver (born 1984/1985) – film editor
- J. T. Walsh – actor

=== Sports ===
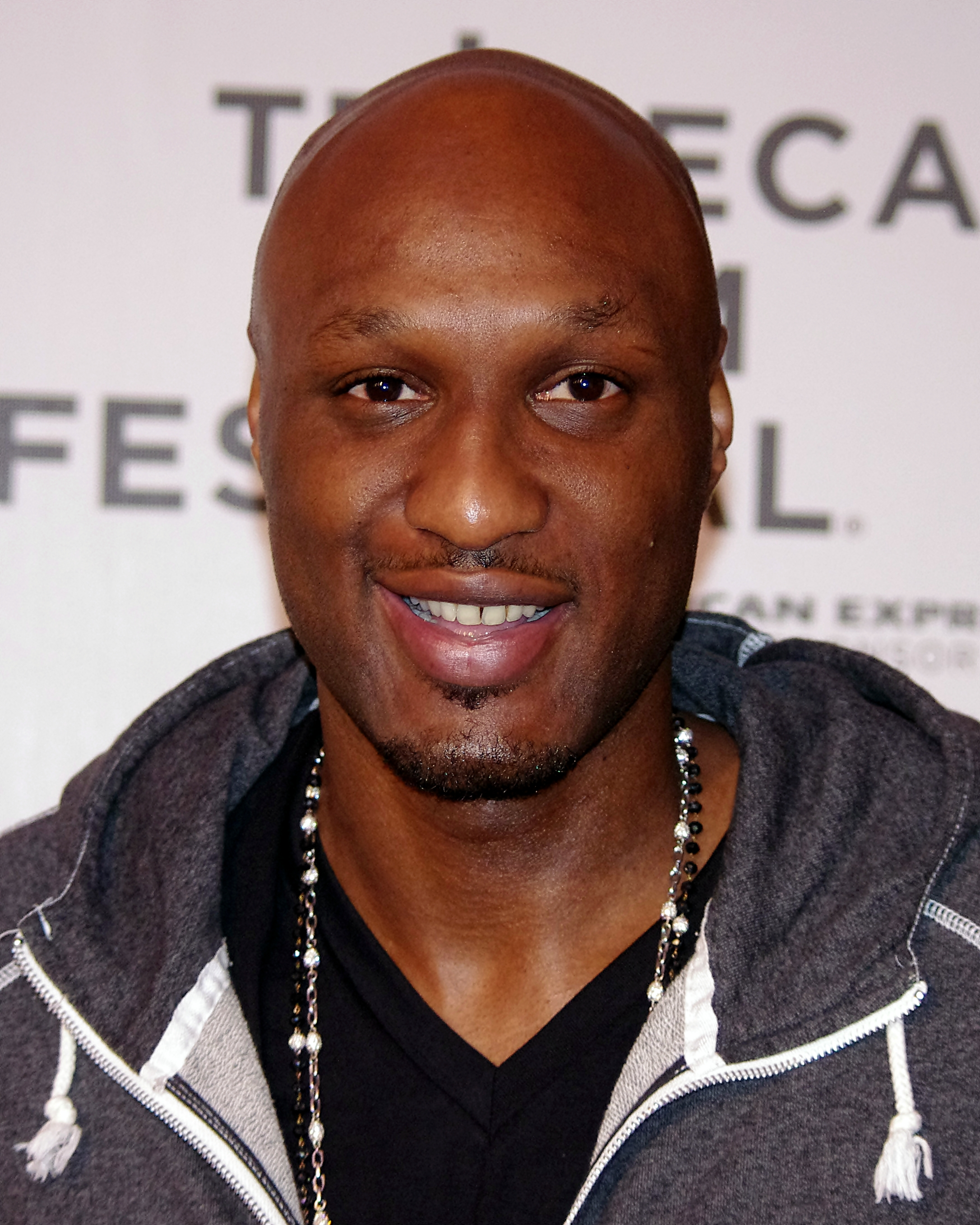
Lamar Odom

- Lou Abbruzzi (1941) – former NFL player for the Boston Yanks
- Pat Abbruzzi (1955) – former CFL player for the Montreal Alouettes
- Jimmy Baron – played in the NBA Summer League for the Utah Jazz and Washington Wizards; and played for Lagun Aro GBC in Spain's ACB League; all-time three-point shooter in the University of Rhode Island and Atlantic 10 history
- Tavorris Bell (2001) – streetball player featured in the AND1 Mixtape Tour Volume 2 video
- David Bernsley (born 1969) – American-Israeli basketball player
- Parfait Bitee – former point guard for URI, also played on the Cameroonian men's national basketball team that won the silver medal at the FIBA Africa Championship 2007
- Danleigh Borman (2008) – MLS player for Toronto FC
- Andy Boss (B.A. 1992) – former professional racing driver in Indy Lights and IMSA
- Todd Bozeman – assistant coach, Rhode Island men's basketball
- Ernie Calverley – former NBA player with the Providence Steamrollers, former URI head coach
- Geoff Cameron – former MLS player for Houston Dynamo, MLS All-Star in 2009 and 2011, member and starter on the 2014 World Cup US Men's National Soccer Team
- Derek Cassidy – former Arena Football League player
- Jim Christian – former head coach of Boston College men's basketball
- Steve Chubin – former NBA player for the Indiana Pacers
- Sean Colson – former NBA player for the Atlanta Hawks and the Houston Rockets
- Tony DeLuca – former NFL player for the Green Bay Packers
- Shelagh Donohoe – Olympic athlete, current Women's rowing head coach.
- Mike Dwyer – former NFL player for the Dallas Cowboys
- Johnny Ezersky – former NBA player for the Providence Steamrollers, Baltimore Bullets, and Boston Celtics
- Frank Ferrara – former NFL defensive end for New York Giants and Hollywood stunt man
- Jason Foster – former NFL player
- Steve Furness – former NFL player for Pittsburgh Steelers and the Detroit Lions
- Tom Garrick – former NBA player for the San Antonio Spurs, and Los Angeles Clippers
- Sasha Gotsmanov – MLS player for the Colorado Rapids
- Virgil Gray – former Arena Football League player
- Andy Gresh – sports analyst, Fox Sports, WSKO, ESPN Radio, Patriots Rock Radio Network
- P. H. Horgan III – PGA Tour golfer
- Chester Jaworski – former basketball player, led the nation in scoring in his senior season, won national player of the year award in his senior season
- Frank Keaney – former URI men's basketball coach, inventor of URI's team color Keaney Blue, and Basketball Hall of Fame member
- Cyril Langevine (born 1998) - Guyanese–American basketball player in the Israeli Basketball Premier League
- Cuttino Mobley – former NBA player for the Los Angeles Clippers, Houston Rockets, Sacramento Kings, and New York Knicks
- Rick Moser – former NFL player
- Xavier Munford (born 1992) – basketball player for Hapoel Tel Aviv of the Israeli Basketball Premier League
- Pat Narduzzi – head football coach for the University of Pittsburgh Panthers
- Lamar Odom (1997–98) – 2-time NBA Champion for the Los Angeles Lakers and recipient of the 6th Man of the Year Award. Drafted by the Los Angeles Clippers
- Josh Oppenheimer – Israeli-American professional basketball coach, and former professional basketball player
- Tom Penders – former college basketball coach
- Stephen Peterson – rower on the 1996 U.S. Olympic team and gold medal winner at the 1990 World Rowing Championships
- Dana Quigley – PGA Tour golfer
- Dawan Robinson – former NBA player (point guard) for the Los Angeles Clippers
- Ron Rothstein – former coach in the NBA for the Miami Heat and the Detroit Pistons, first coach of the Miami Heat
- Kahiem Seawright – former forward for URI, currently playing professional basketball for Valladolid in Spain's ACB League
- Bob Shea – former NBA player for the Providence Steamrollers
- Megan Shoniker – college basketball coach
- Dave Stenhouse – former Major League Baseball pitcher with the Washington Senators 1962–1964; coach of the Brown University baseball team 1981–1990
- Stanley Stutz – former NBA player for the New York Knicks
- Jared Terrell (born 1995) – basketball player in the Israeli Basketball Premier League
- Jacob Toppin (born 2000) – basketball forward in the Israeli Basketball Premier League, formerly in the NBA.
- Tyson Wheeler – former NBA player for the Toronto Raptors
- Bob White – former NFL player
- Andy Williams – former MLS player for Real Salt Lake, formerly for Columbus Crew
- Jeff Williams – former NFL player
- Sly Williams – former NBA player for New York Knicks, Atlanta Hawks, and Boston Celtics

=== Business ===
- Robert Crandall (1960) – former president and chairman of the board, American Airlines
- Michael D. Fascitelli – former president and current Trustee of Vornado Realty Trust
- Giovanni Feroce (1991) – former CEO of Alex and Ani
- John Gomes – luxury real estate broker
- Tony Horton (1980) – fitness guru and developer of P90X
- Sean Ludwick – real estate developer convicted of vehicular homicide
- Nancy McKinstry (1980) – chairman and CEO of Wolters Kluwer
- Olivier Pastré – French economist and banker
- Thomas Ryan (1975) – former CEO of CVS Corporation

=== Science and academia ===
- Daniel G. Aldrich (1939) – founding chancellor of University of California, Irvine
- Kimberly Arcand (1997) – data visualizer and science communicator
- Robert Ballard (PhD 1975, Hon. 1986) – oceanographer, discoverer of the RMS Titanic, professor and director of URI's Center for Ocean Exploration, part of URI's Graduate School of Oceanography.
- Martha Banks (M.A. 1978, PhD 1980) – clinical psychologist
- James W. Carey (B.Sc.) – media theorist
- Rosemary Costigan (Ph.D. 2013) – president of Community College of Rhode Island
- Elizabeth A. Craig – professor and chair of biochemistry at University of Wisconsin–Madison and member of the National Academy of Sciences
- Leon Stanislaw Jablecki (B.Sc. 1938) – rocket scientist
- Roxanne Johnson (M.S. 1997) – chemist working at the United States Environmental Protection Agency
- Deneb Karentz (B.Sc. 1973, PhD 1982) – professor and chair of biological sciences at University of San Francisco
- Cornelius M. Kerwin (M.A. 1973) – president of American University (2007–2017)
- Frederick G. Keyes (B.Sc. 1906) – professor and lecturer in Physics and Chemistry at MIT
- George H. M. Lawrence (B.Sc. MSc, 1952) – botanist, author and professor of Botany; established the Hunt Botanical Library and the journal Huntia
- E. Paul Larrat (B.Sc. 1982, MBA 1984, M.S. 1988) – pharmacist, epidemiologist, researcher, and dean and professor, URI College of Pharmacy
- Herbert Lovett (P.h.D) – psychologist
- Jay Maddock (Ph.D. 1999) – Regents Professor at Texas A&M University
- Catalina Martinez (B.Sc. 1996, MSc. 1999, M.M.A. 2001, M.B.A. 2014) – regional program manager for the National Oceanic and Atmospheric Administration's Office of Ocean Exploration and Research
- Janice Merrill-Oldham (M.L.S. 1984) – Malloy-Rabinowitz Preservation Librarian at the Harvard Library (1995–2010)
- Robert B. Rheault, Jr. (Ph.D. 1996) – marine biologist and aquaculture consultant
- Stuart Vyse (PhD 1987) – psychologist, teacher, speaker and author who specializes in belief in superstitions and critical thinking

=== Military ===
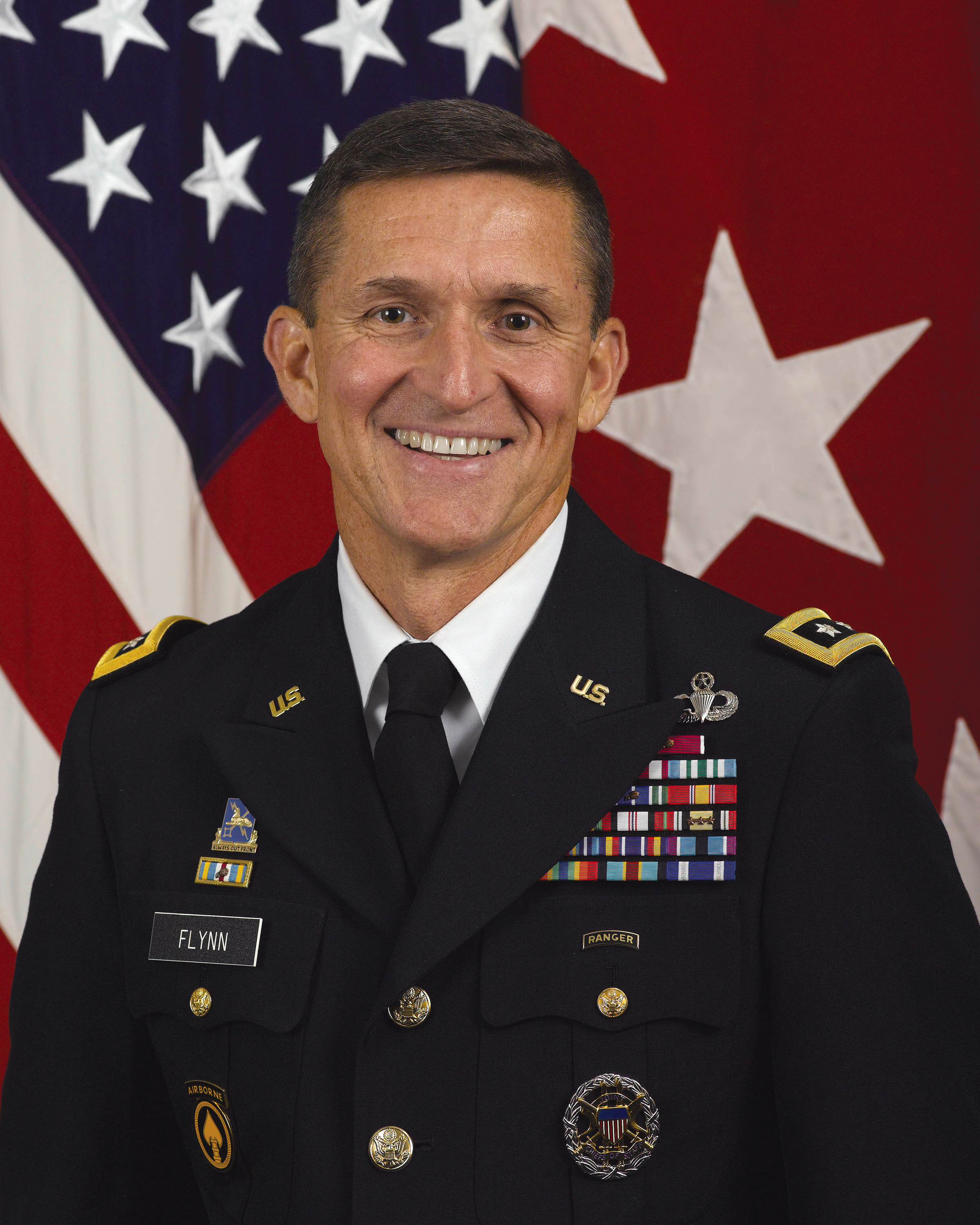
Michael Flynn

- Admiral Jeremy M. "Mike" Boorda (B.A. 1971) – 25th chief of Naval Operations
- General Charles A. Flynn (B.Sc. 1985)
- Lieutenant General Michael T. Flynn (B.Sc. 1981) – director, Defense Intelligence Agency (former), National Security advisor for President Donald Trump (former)
- General Leon J. LaPorte, United States Army four-star general
- Rear Admiral Francis D. "Bill" Moran – third director of the National Oceanic and Atmospheric Administration Commissioned Officer Corps
- Rear Admiral Sigmund R. Petersen – fourth director of the National Oceanic and Atmospheric Administration Commissioned Officer Corps

== Faculty ==
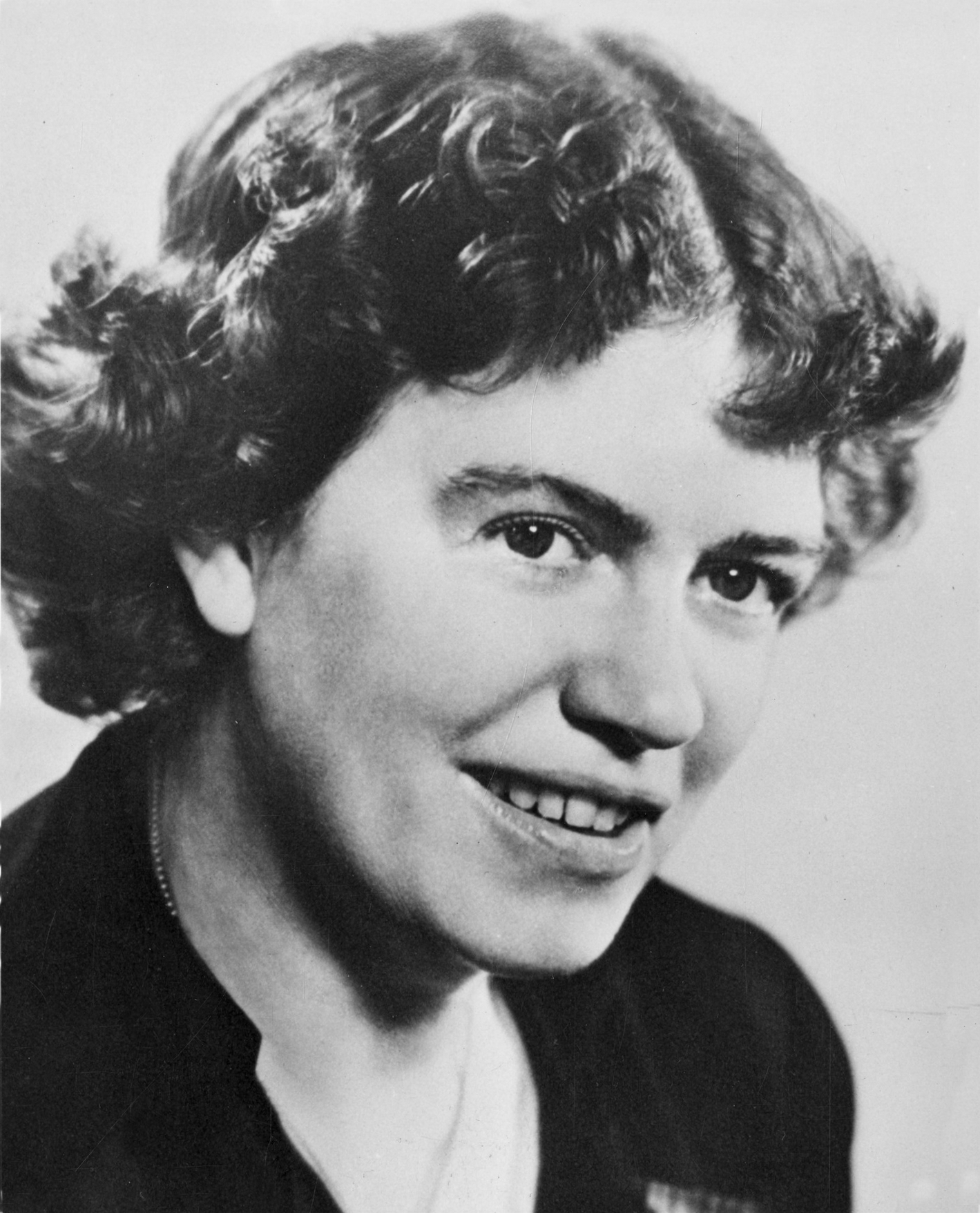
Margaret Mead

- Judith A. Boss, writer
- James Cooley, mathematician
- Fritz Eichenberg, illustrator
- Arthur L. Hardge, administrator
- Peniel E. Joseph, historian
- Gaurav Khanna, black hole physicist and supercomputing pioneer
- Robert Leuci, former detective with the New York City Police Department
- Margaret Mead, Distinguished Professor of Sociology and Anthropology
- Igor Sikorsky, aviation pioneer
- Bruce Sundlun, 71st governor of Rhode Island
- William Wallace Wotherspoon, chief of staff of the United States Army
