= Captain Marvel (film) =

2019 Marvel Studios film

- Theatrical release poster
- Directed by: Anna Boden; Ryan Fleck
- Screenplay by: Anna Boden; Ryan Fleck; Geneva Robertson-Dworet
- Story by: Nicole Perlman; Meg LeFauve; Anna Boden; Ryan Fleck; Geneva Robertson-Dworet
- Based on: Marvel Comics
- Produced by: Kevin Feige
- Starring: Brie Larson; Samuel L. Jackson; Ben Mendelsohn; Djimon Hounsou; Lee Pace; Lashana Lynch; Gemma Chan; Annette Bening; Clark Gregg; Jude Law
- Cinematography: Ben Davis
- Edited by: Elliot Graham; Debbie Berman
- Music by: Pinar Toprak
- Production company: Marvel Studios
- Distributed by: Walt Disney Studios Motion Pictures
- Release dates: February 27, 2019 (London); March 8, 2019 (United States)
- Running time: 124 minutes
- Country: United States
- Language: English
- Budget: $152–175 million
- Box office: $1.131 billion

Captain Marvel is a 2019 American superhero film based on Marvel Comics featuring the character Carol Danvers / Captain Marvel. Produced by Marvel Studios and distributed by Walt Disney Studios Motion Pictures, it is the 21st film in the Marvel Cinematic Universe (MCU). The film was directed by Anna Boden and Ryan Fleck from a screenplay they co-wrote with Geneva Robertson-Dworet. It stars Brie Larson as Carol Danvers, alongside Samuel L. Jackson, Ben Mendelsohn, Djimon Hounsou, Lee Pace, Lashana Lynch, Gemma Chan, Annette Bening, Clark Gregg, and Jude Law. Set in 1995, the story follows Danvers as she becomes Captain Marvel after Earth is caught in a galactic conflict.

Development began by May 2013. The film was officially announced in October 2014 as Marvel Studios' first female-led project. Nicole Perlman and Meg LeFauve were hired to write it the following April after submitting separate takes on the character, and borrowed elements from Roy Thomas's 1971 "Kree–Skrull War" comic book storyline. Larson was announced as Danvers at the 2016 San Diego Comic-Con, with Boden and Fleck hired to direct in April 2017. Robertson-Dworet was soon hired to re-write the script, and the rest of the cast were added by the start of filming. Location shooting began in January 2018, with principal photography starting that March in California and concluding in Louisiana in July 2018. Several actors reprise their roles from previous MCU films, including Jackson and Gregg. They were both digitally de-aged in post-production to reflect the film's 1990s setting.

Captain Marvel premiered in London on February 27, 2019, and was theatrically released in the United States on March 8 as part of Phase Three of the MCU. The film grossed over $1.1 billion worldwide, making it the first female-led superhero film to pass the billion-dollar mark. It became the fifth-highest-grossing film of 2019 and was the 23rd-highest-grossing film of all time during its theatrical run. The film received generally positive reviews from critics, with praise for the performances—particularly Larson's. Audience responses were also positive, although the audience reception section on Rotten Tomatoes was subject to review bombing. A sequel, The Marvels, was released on November 10, 2023.

== Plot ==
In 1995, on the Kree Empire's capital planet of Hala, Starforce member Vers suffers from amnesia and recurring nightmares involving an older woman. Yon-Rogg, her mentor and commander, trains Vers to control her abilities, while the Supreme Intelligence, the artificial intelligence that rules the Kree, urges her to keep her emotions in check.

During a mission to rescue an undercover operative infiltrating a group of Skrulls, alien shapeshifters with whom the Kree are at war, Vers is captured by Skrull commander Talos. A probe of Vers's memories leads them to Earth. Vers escapes and crash-lands in Los Angeles. Her presence attracts S.H.I.E.L.D. agents Nick Fury and Phil Coulson, whose investigation is interrupted by a Skrull attack. Vers recovers a crystal containing her extracted memories in the ensuing chase while Fury kills a Skrull impersonating Coulson.

Talos, disguised as Fury's boss Keller, orders Fury to work with Vers and keep tabs on her. Using her extracted memories, Vers and Fury go to the Project Pegasus installation at a former U.S. Air Force base. They discover that Vers is a human pilot who was presumed to have died in 1989 while testing an experimental light-speed engine designed by Dr. Wendy Lawson, whom Vers recognizes as the woman from her nightmares. Fury informs S.H.I.E.L.D. of their location and a team arrives. When he realizes that Keller is Talos, Fury helps Vers escape in a prototype jet with Lawson's stowaway cat, Goose.

They fly to Louisiana to meet former pilot Maria Rambeau, the last person to see Vers and Lawson alive. Rambeau and her daughter Monica reveal that Vers is Carol Danvers, who was once like family to them. Talos, arriving unarmed, says the Skrulls are refugees searching for a new home to escape the Kree's unjust war and Lawson was Mar-Vell, a renegade Kree scientist helping them. Talos plays a recovered blackbox recording from Lawson's jet, prompting Danvers to remember the crash: Yon-Rogg killed Mar-Vell to prevent her from destroying the engine before the Kree could recover it. Danvers destroyed the engine herself and absorbed its energy, gaining powers but losing her memory.

Danvers, Talos, Fury, and Rambeau locate Lawson's cloaked laboratory orbiting Earth, where Lawson hid several Skrulls, including Talos's family, and the Tesseract, the power source of Lawson's engine. Danvers is captured by Starforce and interfaces with the Supreme Intelligence. Danvers removes a Kree implant that has been suppressing her powers, allowing her to reach her full potential. In the subsequent battle, Fury retrieves Goose, who is revealed to be an alien Flerken. Goose swallows the Tesseract and scratches Fury, blinding his left eye. Danvers destroys a Kree bomber, forcing Kree officer Ronan the Accuser and his squadron to retreat.

Danvers overpowers Yon-Rogg and sends him to Hala with a warning for the Supreme Intelligence. She then departs to help the Skrulls find a new homeworld, leaving Fury a modified pager to contact her in an emergency. After experiencing extraterrestrial threats, Fury drafts an initiative to locate more heroes like Danvers, naming it after her Air Force call sign "Avenger". In a mid-credits scene set in 2018, the pager has been activated (Note: As depicted in Avengers: Infinity War (2018)) and is being monitored by the Avengers when Danvers appears looking for Fury. (Note: This scene was directed by Avengers: Endgame (2019) directors Anthony and Joe Russo as a lead-in to that film.) In a post-credits scene, Goose climbs onto Fury's desk and regurgitates the Tesseract.

== Cast ==
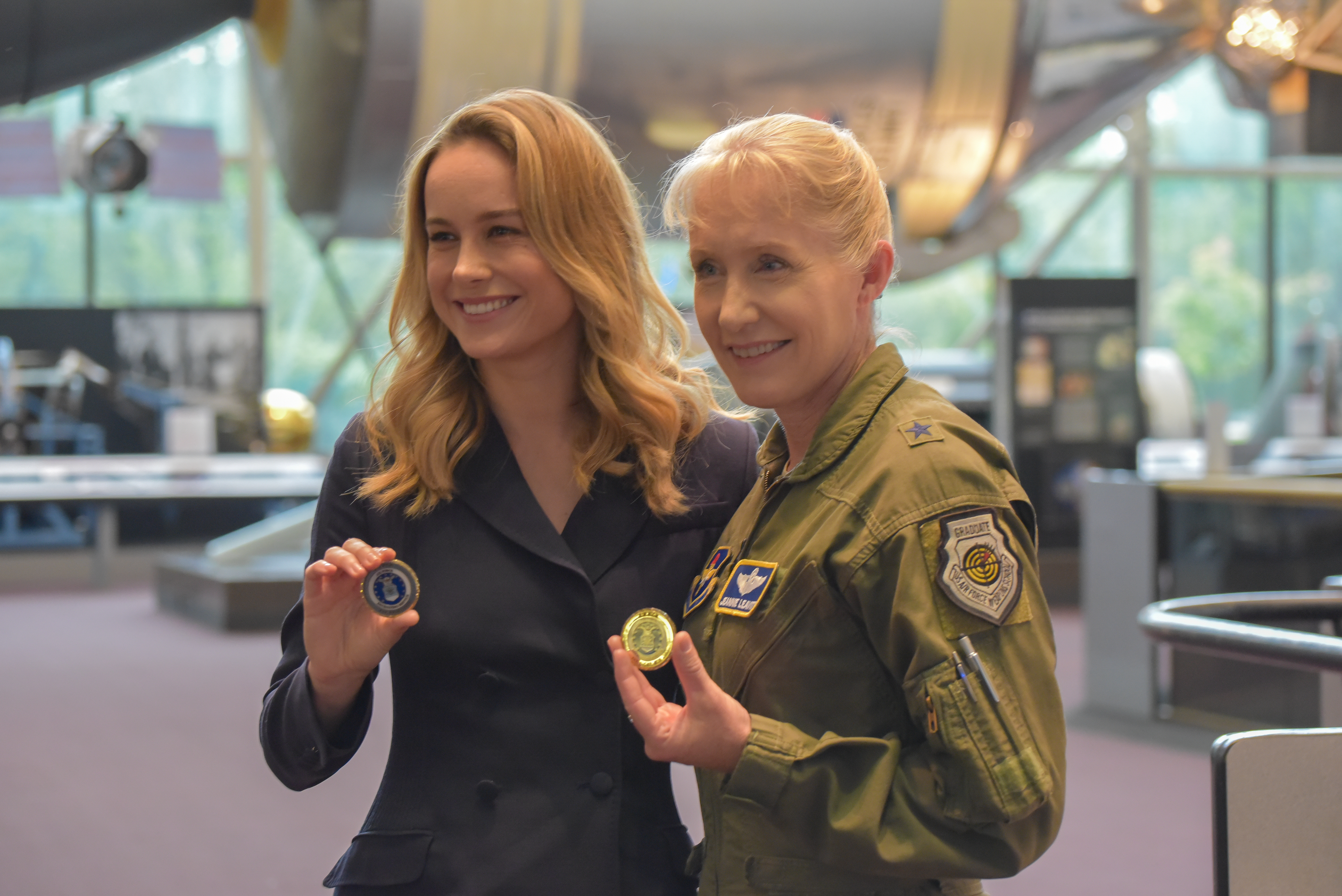
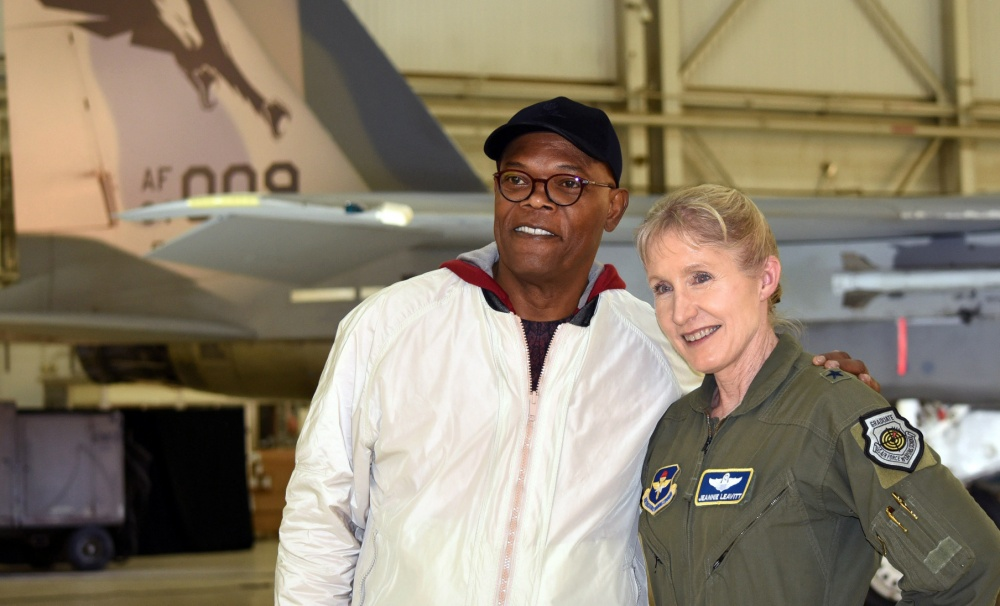
Brie Larson (top) and Samuel L. Jackson (bottom) with Maj. Gen. Jeannie Leavitt, the U.S. Air Force's first female fighter pilot and consultant on Captain Marvel
- Brie Larson as Carol Danvers / Vers / Captain Marvel:
  An ex-U.S. Air Force fighter pilot and member of an elite Kree military unit called Starforce. She was imbued with superhuman strength, energy projection, and flight after exposure to Tesseract energy. Larson described Danvers as a "believer in truth and justice" and a "bridge between Earth and space", who must balance her unemotional Kree side with her "flawed" human half. Larson also called Danvers aggressive, quick-tempered, and invasive—attributes that help her in a fight but prove to be character flaws. Marvel Studios president Kevin Feige said Larson was cast because of her ability to balance the character's vast powers with her humanity. Due to concern that Larson (aged 26 when she was cast) was too young to portray an accomplished airman, screenwriter Nicole Perlman consulted with the Air Force, who said it was possible for someone to excel between the ages of 28 and 34. Larson trained for nine months for the role, learning judo, boxing, and wrestling. She also visited Nellis Air Force Base and met with active duty airmen, including Brigadier General Jeannie Leavitt and Thunderbirds pilot Major Stephen Del Bagno, in preparation for the role. Carol Danvers is portrayed as a thirteen-year-old by Mckenna Grace, and as a six-year-old by London Fuller.
- Samuel L. Jackson as Nick Fury:
  The future director of S.H.I.E.L.D., who at this time is a low-level bureaucrat. Fury appears without his signature eye patch as the film is set before he loses his eye. Feige explained that Danvers is the first superhero that Fury has come across, which sets him on a path to his role working with heroes in later-set MCU films. Jackson described Fury at this point as a desk jockey, who has not yet become cynical towards bureaucracy and who learns in the film that there are superpowered beings who could help S.H.I.E.L.D. Jackson added that trusting Danvers plays a key role in his development, as they become "compatriots" throughout the film. Jackson was digitally de-aged by 25 years, the first time Marvel had done this for an entire film.
- Ben Mendelsohn as Talos and Keller:
  Talos is the shape-shifting leader of the Skrulls who goes undercover at S.H.I.E.L.D. as Fury's boss, Keller. Mendelsohn described Keller as "buttoned up" compared to Talos's "more laid-back" Skrull persona. Mendelsohn uses an American accent inspired by former United States Secretary of Defense Donald Rumsfeld for Keller, and his native Australian accent for Talos; the latter was chosen, after a "lengthy discussion", due to what Mendelsohn called "earthy correctness". The makeup and prosthetics necessary to portray Talos took "a couple of hours" to apply. Executive producer Johnathan Schwartz added that "it's sort of fun to show off both the Skrull's powers and Ben's range as an actor" with the character. Talos also takes on a surfer-girl form, portrayed by Emily Ozrey and Abigaille Ozrey, and a Kree soldier disguise played by Duane Henry. An early version of the script had the character dying in the film.
- Djimon Hounsou as Korath:
  A Kree swordsman and second-in-command of Starforce. Hounsou explained that Korath was "at his infancy" in the film compared to his appearance in the Marvel Cinematic Universe (MCU) film Guardians of the Galaxy (2014), but was "still a humorless machine".
- Lee Pace as Ronan the Accuser:
  A high-ranking Kree official. Compared with his appearance in Guardians of the Galaxy, Ronan is not yet a "radical zealot", with his role in the Kree military intersecting with Starforce "in an interesting way".
- Lashana Lynch as Maria Rambeau:
  One of Danvers's oldest friends and a fellow Air Force pilot who goes by the call sign "Photon". She is a single mother to daughter Monica. Lynch described Rambeau as "resilient" and someone "that you don't feel like you need to help". Larson called Rambeau "the representation of love" in the film and "an incredible badass". She described the friendship between Danvers and Rambeau as equal, with "a playful competitiveness [and a] mutual respect". Like Larson, Lynch met with active duty airmen in preparation for the role. In particular, she met with pilots who are also mothers. Lynch was excited to portray a character the audience would be proud of and could relate to, especially mothers and members of the black community, helping to continue "a real through-line" for African-American characters in the MCU after Black Panther (2018).
- Gemma Chan as Minn-Erva:
  A Kree sniper and member of Starforce. Chan explained that Minn-Erva was "the star of Starforce" before Danvers joined the team and is "slightly threatened by someone else who has come in and is also very talented".
- Annette Bening as the Supreme Intelligence and Mar-Vell / Dr. Wendy Lawson:
  The Supreme Intelligence is an artificial intelligence that is the collective embodiment of the greatest minds of the Kree people, and the ruler of the Kree Empire. It appears in different forms to each person, specifically to Vers as rebel Kree scientist Mar-Vell, who had disguised herself on Earth as Danvers's boss Dr. Wendy Lawson. Mar-Vell was originally written as a male love interest to Danvers as in the comics, but after struggling to cast the character, co-director Anna Boden suggested that they cast a woman instead, and tie her in to the Supreme Intelligence storyline by combining those characters. Boden said Bening was "regal" as the Supreme Intelligence, and "casual and cool and laid back" as Lawson. Feige said changing Mar-Vell's gender was important to Danvers's development in the film, giving her a female mentor.
- Clark Gregg as Phil Coulson:
  A rookie agent of S.H.I.E.L.D. who works closely with Fury. Gregg said the film would be "the earliest we will have seen [Coulson in the MCU], so when he says 'Mr. Stark, this isn't my first rodeo' in Iron Man (2008), this is maybe the rodeo he's talking about." He had to work to portray Coulson as "a little less crusty and jaded" than he is in the present day of the MCU. Though Coulson encountered the Kree in the MCU television series Agents of S.H.I.E.L.D. (2013–2020), Schwartz noted that Captain Marvel would not need to worry about that since it is a prequel where Kree is not even "part of his vocabulary yet". Like Jackson, Gregg was digitally de-aged by 25 years.
- Jude Law as Yon-Rogg:
  The commander of Starforce and Danvers's mentor, who trains her to use her new powers. Law said that his character is "driven by a belief in the divine leadership of the Kree people. So he's almost a devout warrior—unquestioning, conservative, but inspirational." Law also stated that his character has a special relationship with Danvers, whom he views as a protégée, which becomes a source of tension in the film with the other members of Starforce. Robert Downey Jr., who portrays Tony Stark in the MCU films and who co-starred with Law in Sherlock Holmes (2009) and its sequel (2011), counseled him on working with Marvel before Law took the part. In October 2024, Law said he enjoyed making the film but wished that he was able to have more fun with the character and make him "more arch" and humorous. He signed a one-picture deal for the role.

Additional members of Starforce include Algenis Pérez Soto as Att-Lass, the marksman of the team, and Rune Temte as Bron-Char, the "bigger, stronger guy who fights with his fists". Maria's daughter, Monica Rambeau, is played by Akira and Azari Akbar as an eleven-year-old and a five-year-old, respectively. Sharon Blynn portrays Soren, Talos's wife, while Auden L. Ophuls and Harriet L. Ophuls portray their daughter. Robert Kazinsky appears as a biker nicknamed "The Don". Vik Sahay plays a Torfan, while Chuku Modu portrays the Kree spy Soh-Larr. Colin Ford appears as Danvers's brother, Steve, and Kenneth Mitchell plays their father. Danvers's comic book cat Chewie (named for the Star Wars character Chewbacca) appears in the film, renamed Goose after the Top Gun (1986) character Nick "Goose" Bradshaw. Its name was changed since Star Wars is a contemporary franchise and not specific to Danvers, unlike the pilot-themed Top Gun. Goose is portrayed by four different cats, each chosen for their actions and personality: Reggie, Archie, Rizzo, and Gonzo. Patrick Brennan, who previously portrayed Marcus Daniels in Agents of S.H.I.E.L.D., appears as a bartender. Producer Victoria Alonso alluded to the possibility that the two were the same character.

Real-life Air Force pilots Matthew "Spider" Kimmel and Stephen "Cajun" Del Bagno appear as themselves. Del Bagno died months prior to the film's release, and it is dedicated to his memory. Captain Marvel comic book writer Kelly Sue DeConnick makes a cameo appearance as a train station passerby, and Stan Lee, co-creator of Captain Marvel, appears posthumously as himself memorizing the lines for his cameo in Mallrats (1995). Reprising their MCU roles for the mid-credits scene are Chris Evans as Steve Rogers, Scarlett Johansson as Natasha Romanoff, Mark Ruffalo as Bruce Banner, and Don Cheadle as James "Rhodey" Rhodes.

== Production ==
=== Development ===
We've been talking a lot about ... how to write a strong female superhero without making it Superman with boobs. ... [W]e have this constant back-and-forth about how to tell a story that is compelling, entertaining, moving, kick-ass, and fun, and also be aware of what those larger implications might be.

— Initial screenwriter Nicole Perlman on creating Marvel Studios' first lead female superhero

By May 2013, Marvel Studios' writing room had produced a script for a film featuring Ms. Marvel, an alias used by the character Carol Danvers before she took the mantle Captain Marvel. Later that year, executive producer Louis D'Esposito said the studio was interested in a female-driven superhero film and had plenty of "strong female characters" from which to choose, suggesting Captain Marvel, Black Widow, Pepper Potts, or Peggy Carter as possible candidates. Kevin Feige, President of Marvel Studios, said that if Marvel was to make a female-led film, he would prefer it to be a new character to the Marvel Cinematic Universe (MCU) like Captain Marvel, for whom an origin story could be told. In August 2014, Feige stated that development had begun on a Captain Marvel film, and said members of the public asked about the project more often than Iron Man 4 or Avengers: Infinity War (2018).

In October 2014, Feige announced that Captain Marvel would be the studio's first female-led film, and would focus on Carol Danvers. It was given a release date of July 6, 2018, as part of their Phase Three slate of films. Feige said the film had been in development almost as long as Guardians of the Galaxy (2014) and Doctor Strange (2016), and one of its biggest challenges would be balancing the title character's "earthbound" adventures with her cosmic powers. He said a writer and director for the film would be announced soon, and female filmmakers were being considered for the project, but he could not promise that filmmakers from a certain demographic would be hired for the film.

In February 2015, Marvel pushed the release date back to November 2, 2018, to accommodate Spider-Man: Homecoming (2017). In early April, Feige revealed that Captain Marvel had been included in an early draft of the Avengers: Age of Ultron (2015) screenplay, but Marvel chose to remove this appearance because they did not want to introduce the character before they were able to explore her backstory and personality first. He also said that Marvel would announce writers for the film within a few weeks, and by mid-April, Guardians of the Galaxy co-screenwriter Nicole Perlman and Inside Out (2015) co-screenwriter Meg LeFauve were announced to be writing the screenplay. The duo were put together as a writing team after impressing Feige with separate takes on the character, and began work on the film within a month. Jessica Gao, who would later become the head writer for the Marvel Studios television series She-Hulk: Attorney at Law (2022), also pitched for the film, as did A. C. Bradley, who became the head writer of the Marvel Studios animated series What If...? (2021–2024). LeFauve found the character being a female superhero to be both "wonderful" and a challenge, believing that the character's power-level could lead to the "Superman curse" of being perceived to be invulnerable. Additionally, LeFauve and Perlman found that writing a "story about a human and not get[ting] too overwhelmed by the worry of representing all women" worked best when approaching the story. An article about young girls who would quit learning to code after they encountered trouble made LeFauve and Perlman consider questions about females being taught they cannot make mistakes or embrace their own power. This helped the duo realize that "part of embracing your power is failure" and seeing it "more as feedback instead of your character".

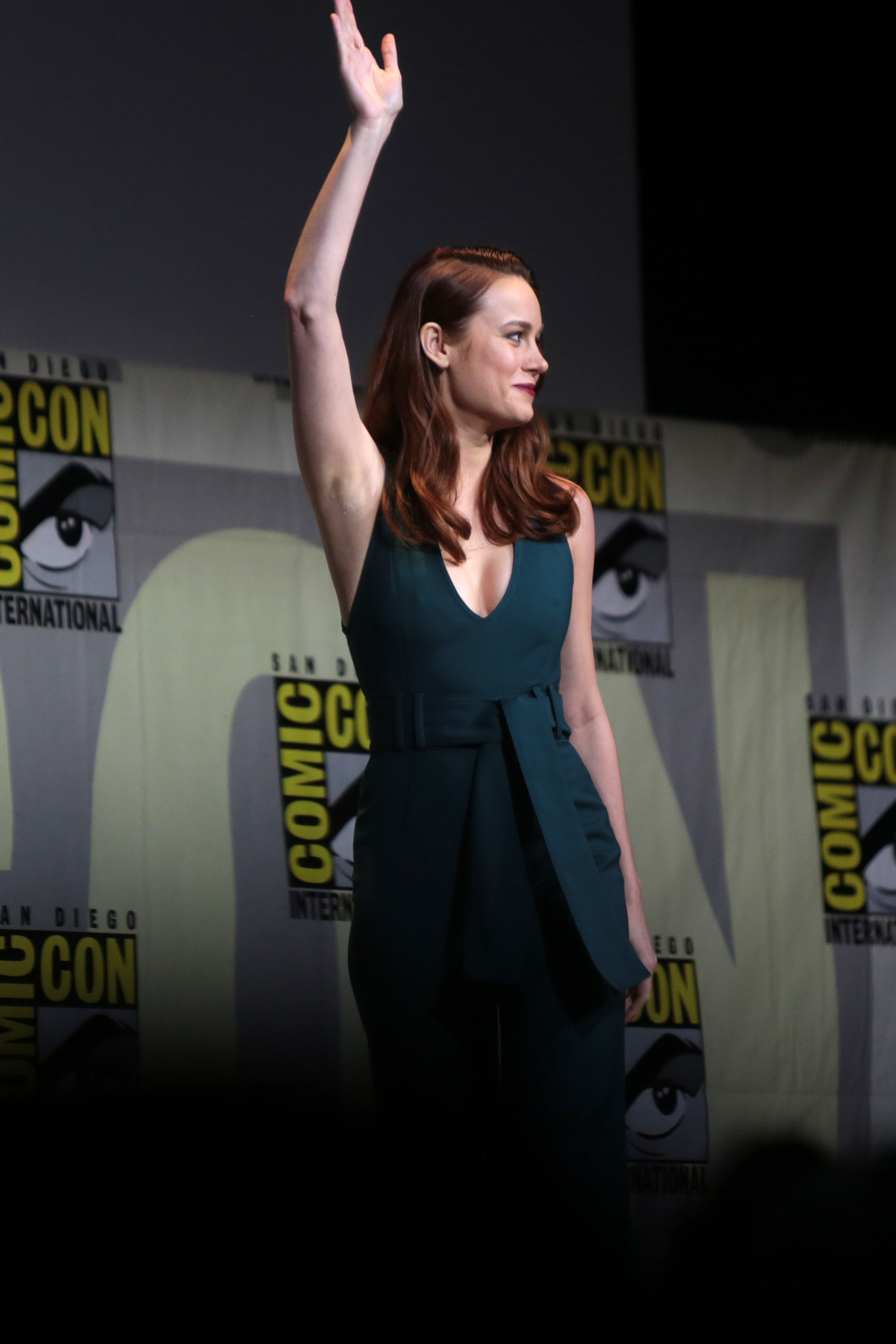
Brie Larson at the 2016 San Diego Comic-Con after being announced in the role of Captain Marvel

By May, Marvel had discussions with Ava DuVernay about directing Captain Marvel or Black Panther (2018), which Feige confirmed a month later, saying that he had met with DuVernay amongst a number of other directors and expected a decision to be made by mid- to late 2015. That September, Feige said that the casting process would not begin until 2016, as the studio did not want to try to cast Carol Danvers until they had decided on the direction for the character in the screenplay, as well as the structure of the film and the character's role in the rest of Marvel's Phase Three films. Producer Jeremy Latcham elaborated that "getting the character right first is going to lead the charge". In October 2015, Marvel changed the release date again, this time moving it to March 8, 2019, to make room for Ant-Man and the Wasp (2018).

Feige stated in April 2016 that a director would be announced within a few months and that the first cast members would be announced in mid-2016. He also mentioned that the film would be about Carol Danvers becoming Captain Marvel. The next month, indie filmmaker Emily Carmichael's name surfaced as a possible contender to direct the film, and by June, Brie Larson emerged as the frontrunner to play Captain Marvel. Larson's casting was confirmed at the 2016 San Diego Comic-Con. She was set to earn $5 million for the film. Larson was initially hesitant to accept the role, but "couldn't deny the fact that this movie is everything I care about, everything that's progressive and important and meaningful, and a symbol I wished I would've had growing up". She was able to bring to the part "some of those [deep emotional] things" she had used in previous, more "dramatic roles". Larson felt this would differentiate Captain Marvel from other superhero films. Also at Comic-Con, Feige said the search for a director had narrowed to ten candidates and he hoped to announce the final choice in the coming months.

Perlman revealed in August that the character's origin story had been changed for the film because of similarities to the DC Comics character Green Lantern, with Feige explaining that the new story is centered on Danvers finding her limitations and vulnerabilities. He added that Danvers is the most powerful character in the MCU, and would become very important in the franchise. Producer Nate Moore said the film avoids the traditional structure of many MCU origin stories, which he described as a character having a problem before gaining "powers at the end of the first act, and the end of the second act they learn about the powers, the third act they probably fight a villain who has a function of the same powers"; instead, Danvers starts the film having already gained her powers.

In October 2016, Feige admitted that the announcement for a director was taking longer than he previously expected, and explained that the studio was now waiting for more of the film's story to be defined in the script so they could then talk to potential directors about it. Once again talking about hiring a female filmmaker to direct the film, Feige said that he did not think it would be a requirement to make a "great version" of the film, but it was something that Marvel felt was important to consider, even if that female filmmaker did not know a lot about the comics, as "they just have to fall in love with it once they are presented with it. It's amazing to see all of the filmmakers read through [the source material] and know, 'Oh, a female's writing it now'", speaking in particular to Kelly Sue DeConnick's run in the comics. Feige expected a director to be announced by the end of 2016; however, Perlman and LeFauve turned in a script treatment around December, pushing additional meetings with director candidates into early 2017.

In February 2017, Perlman stated that despite her and LeFauve being hired almost a year previously, the duo had only recently gotten their "marching orders" for the script, stating that one of the reasons for the delay was figuring out where the film would fit within the MCU. She explained that because of Marvel Studios' continually shifting plans for Phase Three and their culminating Avengers films, Infinity War and Avengers: Endgame (2019), the duo were tasked with creating various different versions of what the film could look like. These were then discussed with Marvel Studios executives to determine what worked from each and how it would fit in with the Avengers plans as they currently stood, before the writing duo would start the process over again; this "iterative" process occurred for over a year-and-a-half. Perlman also discussed the character's femininity, feeling that it was important to make sure she is not "somebody who is a hero in spite of her femininity ... being a woman is part of [her] strength". The writers were also wary of tropes that could be diminishing to a female character but not for male characters, such as things they would not have been concerned about writing for Iron Man but would not play the same way for Captain Marvel.

=== Pre-production ===
This is not a superhero who's perfect or otherworldly. ... [W]hat makes her special is just how human she is. She's funny, but doesn't always tell good jokes. And she can be headstrong and reckless and doesn't always make the perfect decisions for herself. But at her core, she has so much heart and so much humanity—and all of its messiness.

— Co-director Anna Boden on the film's title character

Marvel hired Anna Boden and Ryan Fleck to direct Captain Marvel in April 2017, after the duo impressed the studio over numerous meetings with their vision for the character and because of their experience working in both television and film. Feige said that he and Marvel were particularly impressed with Boden and Fleck's ability to create a diverse range of character-driven stories in all of their works. Feige felt the film had to focus on the complexity and relatability of Carol Danvers's character without being bogged down by the villains and the special effects, and thought that Boden and Fleck could provide this character focus. Filming was scheduled to begin in January 2018, at Pinewood Atlanta Studios in Fayette County, Georgia, but Feige said he did not expect it to begin until February.

By July 2017, Samuel L. Jackson was set to appear in the film, reprising his role as Nick Fury. Larson, who had worked with Jackson on Kong: Skull Island (2017), pushed for Fury's presence in the film. At the 2017 San Diego Comic-Con, Feige revealed that the film would take place in the 1990s and that the Skrulls would be the film's villains, allowing elements from the "Kree–Skrull War" (1971) comic book storyline to be used. By setting the film in the 1990s, Feige noted that Danvers would "be the singular hero" while still giving her a definitive placing in the MCU timeline. Executive producer Jonathan Schwartz said setting the film in the 1990s was an idea from early in the development process, and gave the character a special place and significance within the MCU. It also allowed the film to make connections to plot details from past MCU films that are set later in the timeline. Regarding the elements from the "Kree–Skrull War" used for the film, Schwartz said some paranoia elements would be featured but would not be related to the Anti-Superhero Act as in the comics. He added that the Kree-Skrull conflict would mostly be a "backdrop and mythological underpinning" for the film. In response to the Comic-Con announcements, Graeme McMillan of The Hollywood Reporter compared the film to Captain America: The First Avenger (2011) and the DC Extended Universe (DCEU) film Wonder Woman (2017), as they were also set decades before the present day. By setting the film in the 1990s, McMillan felt it would create the question "what happened to Captain Marvel to take her off the playing field ahead of the Marvel movies that we've seen to date?"

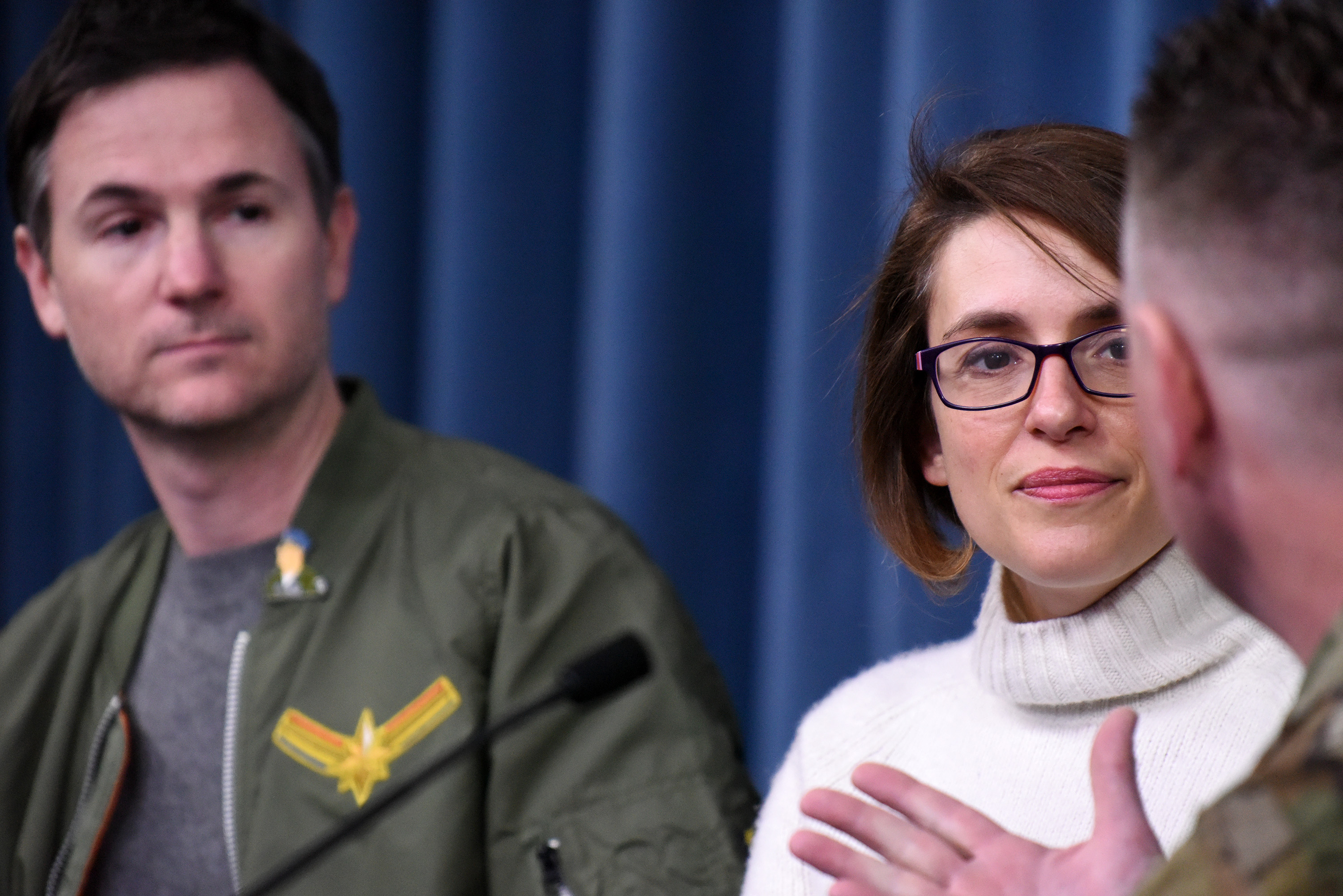
Directors Ryan Fleck and Anna Boden speaking at The Pentagon in March 2019

Also in July, the California Film Commission awarded a $20.7 million tax credit to the production, going towards the first $100 million spent on qualified in-state expenditures, making California the main filming location for Captain Marvel. D'Esposito was excited about this since Marvel Studios' headquarters and post-production facilities are also in the state, allowing them to streamline the production process for this film and others. Awarding of the tax credit was dependent on filming beginning within 180 days. Marvel planned to spend $118.6 million filming in the state, for a net of $97.8 million after the tax credit was applied. Schwartz said one of the reasons Los Angeles was chosen for filming was because "not a lot of big movies shoot in LA anymore, so it weirdly feels like fresh territory for a movie like this".

Geneva Robertson-Dworet was hired by mid-August to take over the scripting duties for Captain Marvel after LeFauve left the project to co-direct Gigantic for Disney Animation. Perlman also left the project, but stated that the story she and LeFauve had worked on in earlier drafts would be retained in the final screenplay. Robertson-Dworet described the film as an action-comedy, and likened her script to an initial one she wrote for Tomb Raider (2018) before that film took a more dramatic tone. She added that it was important to the entire creative team to keep the comedic elements of the film and the sassiness of Danvers's character. Robertson-Dworet also credited Boden for helping to shape Danvers's voice in the film and for the desire "to carve our own path and make sure we weren't retreading the same territory [after the release of Wonder Woman], and showing all facets of what women are capable of". Feige added that Captain Marvel would have action scenes that would pay homage to 1990s action films, including Terminator 2: Judgment Day (1991), since the 1990s action genre was one Marvel Studios had yet to explore. He also stated that much of the film would take place in outer space. RoboCop (1987), The French Connection (1971), and The Conversation (1974) also served as influences on Captain Marvel for Boden and Fleck. Speaking specifically to RoboCop, the directors were drawn to "this idea of a character who's finding himself and finding his past" from that film and how it could connect to the story they were telling in Captain Marvel. DeConnick and quantum physicist Spyridon Michalakis, of the Institute for Quantum Information and Matter at the California Institute of Technology, consulted on the film.

By October, filming was slated to begin in March 2018. Feige said the film would play a significant role in setting up Endgame, which was set for release after Captain Marvel. Ben Mendelsohn entered negotiations to play the film's main villain, having previously worked with Boden and Fleck on their film Mississippi Grind (2015). They had him in mind for the Captain Marvel villain when they first began working on the story, and Mendelsohn agreed to play the role shortly after discussing the film with the directors. By November, Jude Law was in negotiations to join the film, which at the time was reported to be the role of Walter Lawson / Mar-Vell. Keanu Reeves had also been approached for the part but declined. In January 2018, DeWanda Wise was cast as Maria Rambeau, and Mendelsohn and Law were confirmed to have been cast.

=== Filming ===
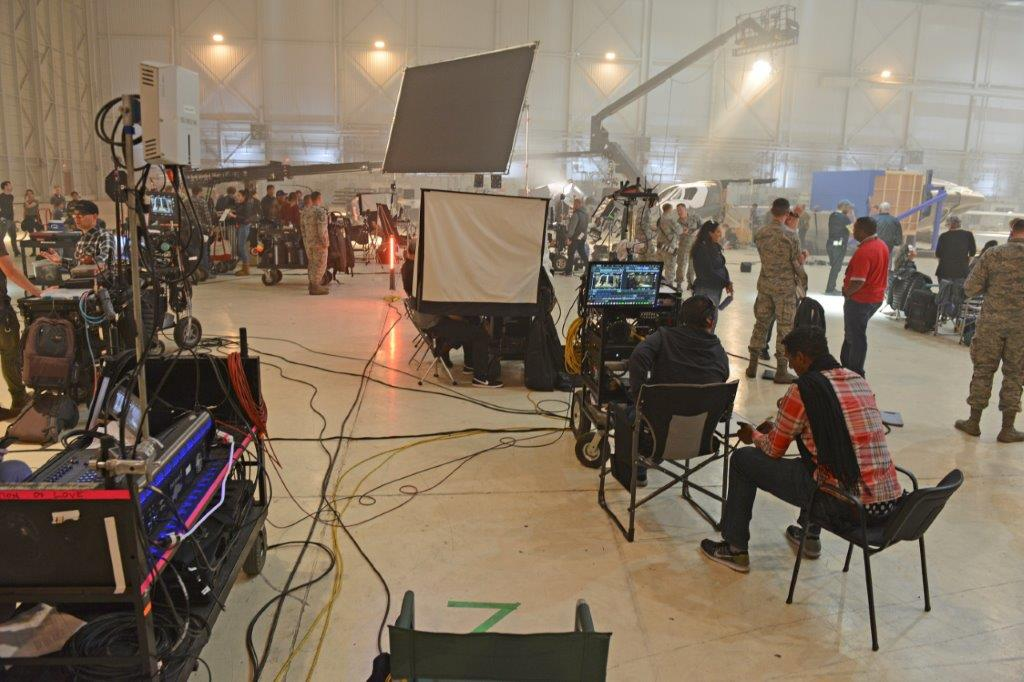
Filming of Captain Marvel at Edwards Air Force Base in April 2018

Location shooting occurred at the end of January 2018. Set photos taken at that time showed Larson in a green-and-black uniform instead of the character's familiar red-and-blue suit. Feige responded by saying that Marvel accepts the risk of set photos being leaked as a consequence of location shooting, and felt that "most people are savvy enough to know they're looking at a behind-the-scenes photo, completely out of context". He added that a large number of scenes in the film would be shot on location.

A month later, Gemma Chan joined the cast as Minn-Erva. In mid-March, Wise withdrew from the film because of a scheduling conflict with her television series She's Gotta Have It (2017–2019). Lashana Lynch entered into negotiations to replace Wise the next day, and was confirmed for the role by the end of the month. At that time, Marvel revealed that Djimon Hounsou, Lee Pace, and Clark Gregg were set to reprise their respective roles of Korath, Ronan the Accuser, and Phil Coulson from earlier MCU films; as those characters were all killed in their previous appearances, Richard Newby of The Hollywood Reporter described the film as a unique opportunity to "strengthen the presence of [the characters] who may not have lived up to their potential". Marvel also announced that Algenis Perez Soto, Rune Temte, and Mckenna Grace had been cast, and revealed that Boden, Fleck, and the writing team of Liz Flahive and Carly Mensch had all contributed to the film's screenplay in addition to LeFauve, Perlman, and Robertson-Dworet. Bek Smith, who previously was a member of Marvel's screenwriter program, performed uncredited rewrites during production.

Principal photography began on March 19 in Los Angeles, at Sony Studios under the working title Open World. Schwartz stated that Open World was chosen because it likened the film to an open world video game that could go in many directions, which is how the production felt about Captain Marvel's story at the time. A 1986 carnival scene was filmed later that week at the Jim Hall Racing Club in Oxnard, California. Filming of Captain Marvel in Los Angeles, along with other big-budget films that took advantage of California's improved tax credit program, helped raise on-location feature film production in the area by 11.7% in the first quarter of 2018, compared with the same period in 2017, the first such double-figure increase since the fourth quarter of 2015. Filming at Shaver Lake outside Fresno, California, was set to take place in April but was pushed back to mid-May. In late April, Feige stated that almost half of filming was completed. The following month, Annette Bening joined the cast in an undisclosed role. Additional location shooting in and around the Los Angeles area included Simi Valley, Edwards Air Force Base, and Lucerne Valley. In late June, production moved to Baton Rouge, Louisiana and New Orleans for two weeks. A realistic cat puppet was used on set since Larson is allergic to cats. Scenes featuring the interior of the Quadjet were filmed on the set used to depict the interior of Quinjets on the MCU television series Agents of S.H.I.E.L.D. (2013–2020) Filming concluded on July 6.

Cinematographer Ben Davis shot primarily on large-format Arri Alexa 65 cameras, liking how the camera rendered the film's costumes. Davis, who previously served as director of photography for Guardians of the Galaxy, Avengers: Age of Ultron, and Doctor Strange (2016), noted that there was a "point of departure" in the visuals of Captain Marvel coming from its 1990s setting. To achieve the 1990s aesthetic, Davis first attempted to utilize post-production techniques to convey a period look, but found that it just softened the image. He then tried using vintage Cooke Panchro and Canon K-35 lenses, but they were not compatible with the large format of the Arri Alexa camera system. Davis ultimately enlisted Dan Sasaki of Panavision to make new lenses for the period scenes that could work with the cameras. Davis initially intended not to use these lenses for scenes set in space, to differentiate them, but found himself using the lenses for some close-ups set in space because he liked the way they looked.

=== Post-production ===
Additional photography was confirmed to have begun via set photos in late November 2018. With the release of the theatrical poster in early December, Marvel revealed that the writing team of Joe Shrapnel and Anna Waterhouse had worked on the film's story, while Jac Schaeffer had contributed to the screenplay. Schaeffer had previously been hired by Marvel to write Black Widow (2021). Bening's and Law's roles were officially confirmed in February 2019 as the Supreme Intelligence and Yon-Rogg, respectively.

The film was edited by Elliot Graham and Debbie Berman, marking Berman's third time co-editing an MCU film after Spider-Man: Homecoming and Black Panther. Captain Marvel was edited using Avid Media Composer software in the Avid DNxHD codec on Apple computers. Berman first became involved with the film when she was working on Homecoming and Boden and Fleck were hired, and was hired herself for Captain Marvel the first week she was working on Black Panther. In addition to Graham and Berman, the editing team was made up of first assistants Jessica Baclesse and Kimberly Boritz, second assistants Basuki Juwono and Christos Voutsinas, and assistant editor Joe Galdo, among others. Berman spoke fondly of this large team, feeling that they gave her the opportunity to focus on the film's story rather than the technical aspects of editing.

Jackson in One Eight Seven (top) and in Captain Marvel (bottom). One Eight Seven (1997) was used as a primary reference to de-age Jackson in Captain Marvel, which is set in 1995.

Visual effects for the film were created by Animal Logic, Cantina Creative, Digital Domain, Framestore, Industrial Light & Magic (ILM), Lola VFX, Luma Pictures, Rise, Rising Sun Pictures, Scanline VFX, Trixter, and Elastic, with Lola VFX working on the de-aging of Jackson and Gregg. Lola looked at several of Jackson's films, including Pulp Fiction (1994), Die Hard with a Vengeance (1995), Jurassic Park (1993), Loaded Weapon 1 (1993), and One Eight Seven (1997), as a reference for his de-aging. However, some of these films were disqualified due to circumstances surrounding the character Jackson was playing: Pulp Fiction because of the character's wig and facial hair, and Jurassic Park because the character was made to appear older in that film. Lola VFX supervisor Trent Claus said the final look was based partly on Die Hard and Loaded Weapon 1, but mostly on One Eight Seven, which he described as the "hero movie". Jackson was de-aged approximately 25 years from the age of 70 at the time of filming, to 45 for the 1995 setting. To do this, both Jackson and Gregg had tracking dots applied to their faces during filming for which the VFX team could anchor the "hand-crafted" facial features that were composited primarily in Autodesk Flame. Lola's team included 40 primary compositors with another 15–20 junior compositors, and created approximately 500 different VFX shots, of which 385 made it in the final cut of film. It was the first time Lola de-aged an actor without using a body double, as it would take too long to re-film all of Fury's scenes with the double.

Trixter did initial development on the look of Danvers's Binary powers and contributed the majority of visual effects for Goose the Cat, including movements that were impossible for real-life cats to act. ILM handled Goose's alien features, as well as much of the final battle for which they used Trixter's work on the Binary powers as well as inspiration from comic books, video games, and anime. ILM also did work on the Supreme Intelligence's virtual environment alongside Animal Logic, who took inspiration from the interior of the Louvre Abu Dhabi and the work they did with fractals for Guardians of the Galaxy Vol. 2 (2017). These scenes were filmed in a white room without green or blue screen, so Animal Logic had to rotoscope the actors out of the footage and place them in the digital environment. To maintain the quality of the actors' hair during this process, Animal Logic created digital hair for Larson and Bening. Luma Pictures was primarily responsible for the train chase sequence, nicknamed the "French Connection" scene after the 1971 film of the same name. They had to make the footage look as if it were continuing along a single train line even though the sequence was filmed in multiple locations around Los Angeles. Digital Domain worked on the Skrull transformation sequences, Rise created the exterior environment of Hala, and Framestore handled the battle sequence on Torfa. Rising Sun handled all of the Kree forearm holograms, the interior of the Project Pegasus hangar, and the exterior of the Quadjet. Scanline worked on effects for the aerial chases and the accident scene where Danvers gains her powers. Elastic created the end titles, and The Third Floor, Inc. provided previsualization and postvisualization work.

The film's mid-credits scene shows Captain Marvel meeting the Avengers, and was directed by Anthony and Joe Russo. Boden described it as a lead-in to the Russos' Avengers: Endgame. For Captain Marvel, Marvel Studios modified their production logo to honor Stan Lee, who died on November 12, 2018, by replacing the characters in the logo with Lee's MCU cameos. The logo is followed by a black screen reading "Thank You Stan". Feige said this was done because the film was Marvel's first since Lee died, and they wanted to start the film by acknowledging him with a celebration of his legacy rather than add a somber memorial to the end of the film.

== Music ==
Pinar Toprak signed on to compose the film's score in June 2018, making her the first woman to score an MCU film. Toprak began by creating the title character's theme, before developing themes for the Kree and the Skrulls, whom she tried to connect in order to "find the universe" for the film's scenes in space and Earth. Toprak wanted Captain Marvel's theme to be recognizable from its first two notes. In addition to Toprak's score, the film's soundtrack includes Alan Silvestri's theme from The Avengers (2012); Michael Giacchino's Marvel Studios Fanfare, which is played over the Marvel Studios logo and referenced during Stan Lee's cameo appearance; and songs from the 1990s.

In April 2019, Mark Salcido of the website Screen Geek alleged that Marvel and the film's directors had been unhappy with Toprak's work on the film even after she had responded to "ample" notes, and had replaced her as composer for the film with Giacchino. Giacchino responded to this report by confirming he was involved in the film, revealing that he had been asked to give feedback on Toprak's work while he was working with Marvel on the score for Spider-Man: Far From Home (2019). He thought Toprak had written a "beautiful theme and an inspiring score" for the film and had helped her work on "a few cues" which he said was him supporting her as a fellow member of the Marvel "family". Giacchino made it clear that he "did not write the score to Captain Marvel ... bottom line is [Toprak] is a fabulous composer and certainly doesn't need me".

== Marketing ==
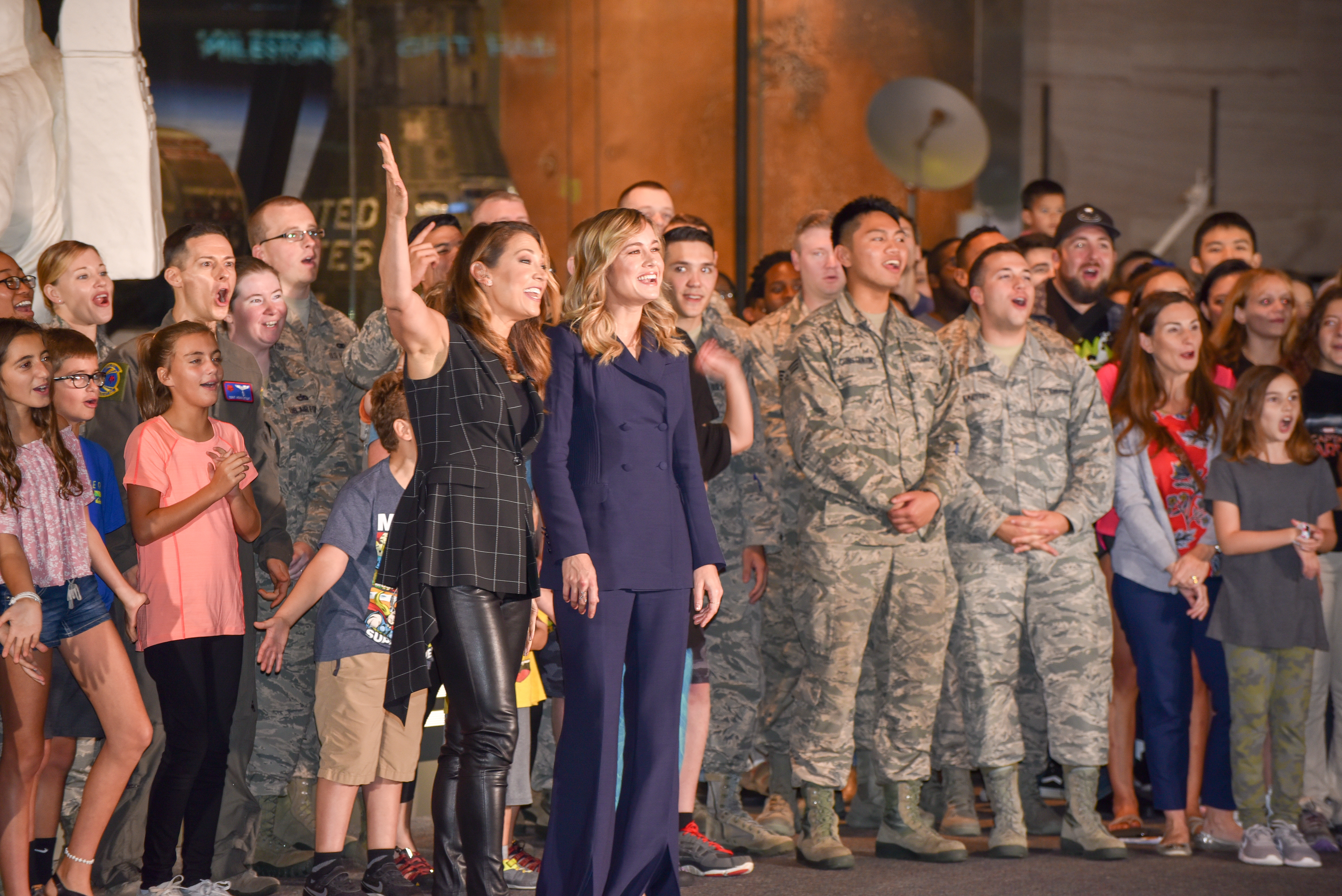
Larson with airmen from the Air Force District of Washington and their families at a screening of the first Captain Marvel trailer at the National Air and Space Museum

In 2017, concept art from the film was shown at San Diego Comic-Con, and a first look at Larson as Danvers was revealed at CineEurope. Larson debuted the first trailer for the film that September at the National Air and Space Museum on Good Morning America. Petrana Radulovic of Polygon felt the trailer showed "large-scale action and intergalactic mayhem that reaches for Infinity War's heights", while Ben Kuchera, also of Polygon, approved of opening the trailer with Blockbuster Video since its logo is identifiable to the audience. Kuchera also compared the "sun-drenched" Air Force pilot sequences to Top Gun. Devan Coogan of Entertainment Weekly called the trailer "a powerful introduction to the MCU's first solo female hero". Graeme McMillian of The Hollywood Reporter felt the prominent narration by Nick Fury "grounds the trailer in something—someone—familiar for the Marvel faithful", but said the changes to the character's origin story were "a risky proposition" to long-time fans of the character. Richard Newby, also of The Hollywood Reporter, noted that the character's unfamiliarity to audiences was not presented as a joke in the trailer as with Marvel's Guardians of the Galaxy and Ant-Man (2015), and commended Davis for its more grounded look than previous MCU films. The trailer did receive some criticism, including that the plot presented was unclear, confusion as to why Danvers punches an elderly woman, and objections to Danvers not smiling much. The trailer was viewed 109 million times in its first 24 hours, becoming the 11th most viewed trailer in that time period.

The second trailer debuted on December 3, 2018, during halftime of the Monday Night Football game between the Washington Redskins and the Philadelphia Eagles. McMillian felt the trailer too overtly responded to online criticisms of the first, including clarification that "the elderly lady Carol punches was a Skrull", more shots of her smiling, and "additional emphasis on both explaining the plot and establishing Carol Danvers as a character". McMillian compared the contents and structure of the two Captain Marvel trailers to those for Thor (2011) and Captain America: The First Avenger. Newby felt the second trailer "offers increased action and a more in-depth look at the mythology surrounding" Captain Marvel, but criticized it for not helping to introduce the film's supporting characters. He compared the trailer to a superhero version of John Carpenter's Starman (1984), explaining, "Explosions, space battles, and superpowers may bring in the crowds, but it's moments [of] humanity and introspection that will allow Captain Marvel to leave her mark and encourage audiences to care about the mystery surrounding who she is." On December 8, Larson participated in a panel at CCXP in Brazil, where she shared footage and an extended trailer from the film and presented an exclusive poster for the event. By January 3, 2019, BoxOffice revealed their "Trailer Impact" metric service indicated approximately 66–70% of people surveyed who viewed the Captain Marvel trailer in the past two weeks expressed interest in seeing the film. In the two weeks it was measured by "Trailer Impact", it was number two for both, behind Avengers: Endgame, and had some of the highest percentage of respondents express interest in seeing the film ever for the service. "Trailer Impact" usually includes films 10 weeks out from release, but BoxOffice decided to add Captain Marvel to the survey 12 weeks out.

In January 2019, the crowdfunding platform GoFundMe announced the #CaptainMarvelChallenge, a campaign to purchase tickets and refreshments for girls and chaperones at the Greater Los Angeles chapter of Girls, Inc. The campaign, inspired by the success of the #BlackPantherChallenge which raised more than $50,000 for children to watch Black Panther, came after Brie Larson suggested on Twitter that there should be a similar campaign for Captain Marvel. For the film's press tour, Larson noted she would be "pushing for representation across the board: my interviews, magazine covers, the clothes that I'm wearing" as part of her support for inclusiveness and opposition to sexual harassment in Hollywood. In February, a commercial for the film aired during the television broadcast of Super Bowl LIII. Bruce Fretts of The New York Times listed the commercial as one of the best advertisements to air during the telecast, stating, "The commercial introduces a new catchphrase—'higher, further, faster'—and lives up to it with a lightning-quick montage that sets pulses racing." CBS charged $5.25 million for each 30-second advertisement that aired during the game. Also in February, Alaska Airlines unveiled a Captain Marvel-themed Boeing 737-800 jet, featuring the film's logo on the side and images of Goose the Cat on its wings. The plane debuted at the Seattle–Tacoma International Airport before its first flight to Orange County, California. At the end of the month, an hour-long video of Goose was livestreamed on Marvel's YouTube channel.

== Release ==
=== Theatrical ===
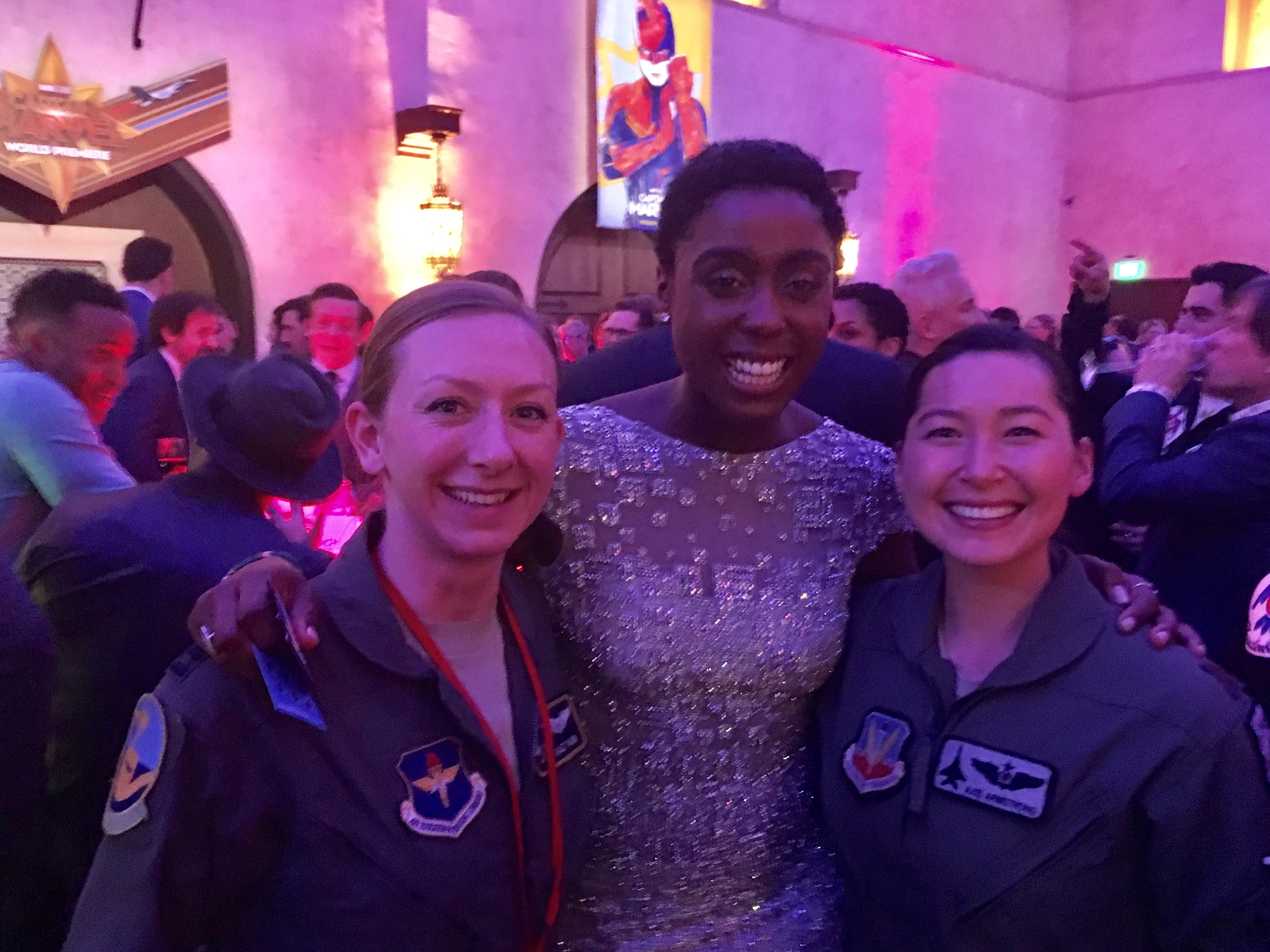
Lashana Lynch with airmen of the 311th Fighter Squadron at the Hollywood premiere of Captain Marvel

Captain Marvel premiered in London on February 27, 2019, and in Hollywood, Los Angeles, on March 4. The Hollywood premiere included a flyover by the United States Air Force Thunderbirds in honor of Thunderbirds pilot Major Stephen Del Bagno, who consulted with Larson on the film before dying in a training accident in April 2018. The film was released in the United States on March 8, coinciding with International Women's Day. It was also released in IMAX and 3D formats. It was originally scheduled for release on July 6, 2018, but in February 2015 it was moved to November 2, 2018, to make room for Spider-Man: Homecoming (2017), and in October 2015 it was pushed to its final March 2019 date for Ant-Man and the Wasp (2018). The film's release in Pakistan was delayed for four weeks. At the time, Disney's South Asia division, which is headquartered in India, had not given Pakistan the rights to distribute it. Commentators online speculated that this was due to ongoing Indo-Pakistani tensions, but Disney South Asia head Nadeem Mandviwalla called this statement "baseless". Captain Marvel is part of Phase Three of the MCU.

=== Home media ===
Captain Marvel was the first Walt Disney Studios Motion Pictures-distributed film not to stream on Netflix, after Disney let their licensing deal with Netflix expire. It became the first theatrical Disney release to stream exclusively on Disney+, which launched on November 12, 2019. The film was released on digital download by Walt Disney Studios Home Entertainment on May 28, 2019, and on Ultra HD Blu-ray, Blu-ray, and DVD on June 11. The digital and Blu-ray releases include behind-the-scenes featurettes, deleted scenes, and gag reels. Captain Marvel has made over $64.2 million from video sales in the U.S. The IMAX Enhanced version of the film was made available on Disney+ beginning on November 12, 2021.

== Reception ==
=== Box office ===
Captain Marvel grossed $426.8 million in the United States and Canada, and $701.6 million in other territories, for a worldwide total of $1.128 billion. It had a worldwide opening of $456.7 million, the sixth-biggest of all time, and the biggest opening for a female-led film. Deadline Hollywood estimated that the film had a total production and advertising cost of $300 million. It is the fifth-highest-grossing film of 2019. On April 2, 2019, the film crossed the $1 billion mark worldwide, becoming the first female-led superhero movie to do so, as well as the seventh Marvel title, the 19th Disney film, and 38th film overall. Deadline Hollywood calculated the film's net profit as $414 million, accounting for production budgets, marketing, talent participations, and other costs; box office grosses and home media revenues placed it fifth on their list of 2019's "Most Valuable Blockbusters".

The film's first 24 hours of advance ticket sales, which began on January 7, 2019, ranked third on Fandango for an MCU film, behind Avengers: Infinity War and Black Panther, and second on Atom Tickets, behind Infinity War. According to Fandango, Captain Marvel had the third-largest advanced ticket sales of any MCU film, behind Infinity War and Black Panther, and surpassed Wonder Woman and Aquaman (2018) during the same time period. The film made $61.4 million on its first day, including $20.7 million from Thursday night previews, which was the fifth-highest total for a Marvel film and second-highest for a March release, behind Batman v Superman: Dawn of Justice (2016). It made $153.4 million over its opening weekend, making this the third-best March opening, after Batman v Superman: Dawn of Justice and Beauty and the Beast (2017), as well as seventh-highest of the MCU. Captain Marvel would hold the record for having the highest opening weekend for a female-directed film until it was surpassed by Barbie four years later in 2023. The film remained in first place during its second weekend, with $69.3 million, the second-highest sophomore weekend in March, behind Beauty and the Beast. The film grossed $35.2 million in its third weekend, dropping to second, behind Us. In the following weeks it dropped to third, fifth, sixth, and fourth, before rising to second again in its eighth weekend with the release of Avengers: Endgame. Captain Marvel finished its box office run as the sixth highest-grossing film of 2019 in this region.

On its first day of international release, the film made $5.9 million in South Korea and $1.7 million in France, as well as $2.51 million from Thursday night previews in China, the fourth-best for an MCU film in the country. Through its first two days of release in foreign territories the film made $44 million, including $9.1 million in South Korea, $3 million in Brazil, $2.9 million in France and $2.5 million in Australia. It also grossed $34 million on its first day in China, the third-best superhero opening day ever in the country. The film went on to have a foreign opening weekend of $302.4 million, the fifth-best of all time. Its largest markets were China ($89.3 million), South Korea ($24.1 million), the UK ($16.8 million), Brazil ($13.4 million, the second-best opening of any film in the country's history) and Mexico ($12.8 million, fifth-best ever). Through its first 12 days of release, the film's highest-grossing foreign countries were China ($135.7 million), South Korea ($37.5 million), the United Kingdom ($32.9 million), Brazil ($26.1 million) and Mexico ($25.7 million). By April 2, the film's largest foreign markets were China ($152.3 million), South Korea ($43.7 million), the UK ($43.3 million), Brazil ($34.5 million) and Mexico ($31.8 million).

=== Critical response ===
The review aggregator Rotten Tomatoes reported an approval rating of 79%, with an average score of 6.8/10, based on 545 reviews. The website's critical consensus reads, "Packed with action, humor, and visual thrills, Captain Marvel introduces the MCU's latest hero with an origin story that makes effective use of the franchise's signature formula." Metacritic, which uses a weighted average, assigned the film a score of 64 out of 100 based on 56 critics, indicating "generally favorable" reviews. According to The New York Times, the film's overall reception was "fairly positive", but it was not as well-received as other films in the MCU. The Hindustan Times, collating multiple reviews of the film, noted praise for Brie Larson's performance but also criticism for the film's "convoluted plot and lack of originality".

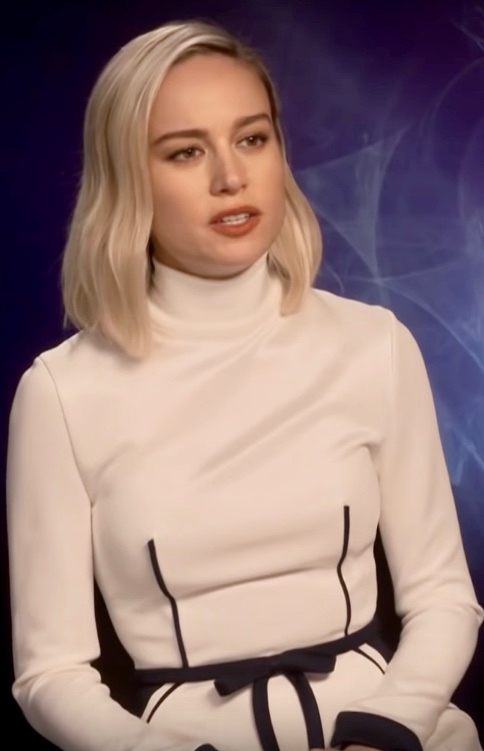
Brie Larson's performance as Carol Danvers received praise from critics

Kenneth Turan, writing for the Los Angeles Times, lauded Larson's performance and the direction of Boden and Fleck, saying, "Marvel has come to recognize, as this film proves, that even effects-heavy behemoths can benefit from a directing touch that is human, not programmatic, that understands character and nuance and can create scenes with an emotional heft we might not expect." A.O. Scott of The New York Times said the film was "not too long, not too self-important, and benefits from the craft and talent of a cast that includes Annette Bening, Jude Law, and Ben Mendelsohn". Writing for Variety, Owen Gleiberman also praised the film's direction. He said that Boden and Fleck had not been able to retain their signature style of "low-key American neorealis[m]", but was still positive about how they were able to create a film with "enough tricks and moods and sleight-of-hand layers to keep us honestly absorbed" within the house style of the MCU. Richard Roeper of the Chicago Sun-Times gave the film 3.5 out of 4 stars, and said it was a "real treat" to follow the origin stories of both Carol Danvers and Nick Fury. Rolling Stone's Peter Travers gave it four stars and praised Larson's performance for bringing "layers of feeling to a role that a lesser actress might have let slide by on pyrotechnics. You see how she lays the foundation for a character who defies male objectification and becomes akin to what Joni Mitchell called 'a woman of heart and mind.'" Anthony Lane of The New Yorker stated, "Superhero cinema has lectured us, ad infinitum, on the responsibility that is conferred by extraordinary gifts. Praise be to Larson, for reminding us that they can be bringers of fun."

Todd McCarthy of The Hollywood Reporter described the film as "mundane, marked by unimaginative plotting, cut-rate villains, a bland visual style and a lack of elan in every department". David Ehrlich at IndieWire gave the film a 'C−' grade and called it "neither a blast from the past, nor an inspiring glimpse into the future ... it's just another Marvel movie. And not a particularly good one". Ehrlich praised Mendelsohn, saying he gave the best performance in the film. Joe Morgenstern of The Wall Street Journal said Danvers "is a candidate for genuine heroism" but found a "fundamental dissonance between the depth of her plight and the shallow disorganization of the script". The A.V. Club's Ignatiy Vishnevetsky was disappointed by the film, finding it to be "everything you might expect a sci-fi superhero movie to be, if you hadn't seen one in a long time". Richard Brody of The New Yorker compared the film to a political commercial that "packs a worthy message [but] hardly counts as an aesthetic experience. The message of the film is conveyed less through the story than through its casting."

=== Audience response ===
In late December 2018, the film was named as the most anticipated 2019 film by IMDb, the most anticipated new standalone comic book film and the second-most anticipated blockbuster of 2019 according to Fandango, and the second-most anticipated superhero and overall film by Atom Tickets.

Ahead of the film's release, Captain Marvel's "Want to See" score—an audience anticipation poll on Rotten Tomatoes—had fallen to 28%. Reports described the decline as an effort to review bomb the film's page with negative comments attacking the film and Larson for their perceived feminism. Rotten Tomatoes changed the "Want to See" feature shortly after, showing only the number of people indicating interest in the film instead of a percentage. The announcement said this was part of a larger redesign of the site, and that the "Want to See" feature would be restored once the film was released. By 8:00 a.m. on opening day in the United States, the film held a 33% audience score on Rotten Tomatoes from more than 58,000 reviews, which was more audience reviews than Avengers: Infinity War had during its entire theatrical run. Analysts attributed the low score and sheer number of reviews to online trolling. Rotten Tomatoes later said a bug was responsible for the high count of reviews, and by 1:00 p.m. the number of counted ratings was down to 7,000 with an audience score of 35%.

Audiences of the film polled by CinemaScore gave it an average grade of "A" on a scale of A+ to F, while PostTrak reported that 73% of filmgoers gave it a "definite recommend". 58% said it met their expectations, while 35% said it exceeded them. Unlike Wonder Woman, which was watched by more women than men, Captain Marvel's initial audience was 61% male, according to PostTrak. Discussing these statistics, Deadline Hollywood's Anthony D'Alessandro praised CinemaScore and PostTrak for taking scientific polls that actually identified how the audience was feeling about the film, and criticized the Rotten Tomatoes audience score as an "ancient 1990s means of collecting opinions online" that is influenced by "ugly Internet troll noise".

=== Accolades ===
Award	Date of ceremony	Category	Recipient(s)	Result	Ref(s)
AACTA Awards	December 4, 2019	Best Visual Effects or Animation	Chris Townsend, Damien Carr, Paul Butterworth, Greg Jowle	Nominated	
ASCAP Award	June 23, 2020	Top Box Office Films	Pinar Toprak	Won	
Costume Designers Guild Awards	January 28, 2020	Excellence in Sci-Fi/Fantasy Film	Sanja M. Hays	Nominated	
Golden Trailer Awards	May 29, 2019	Best Fantasy Adventure	"Unstoppable" (MOCEAN)	Nominated	
Golden Trailer Awards	May 29, 2019	Best Fantasy Adventure TV Spot (for a Feature Film)	"Ready" (MOCEAN)	Nominated	
Golden Trailer Awards	May 29, 2019	Best Sound Editing in a TV Spot (for a Feature Film)	"Buckle Up for Safe" :90 (AV Squad)	Nominated	
Golden Trailer Awards	May 29, 2019	Best Fantasy Adventure Poster	"Dolby Poster" (LA)	Won	
Golden Trailer Awards	July 22, 2021	Best Home Ent Action	"Bonus" (Tiny Hero)	Won	
Hollywood Critics Association Awards	January 9, 2020	Best Action / War Film	Captain Marvel	Nominated	
Hollywood Critics Association Awards	January 9, 2020	Best Blockbuster	Captain Marvel	Nominated	
Hollywood Critics Association Awards	January 9, 2020	Best Stunt Work	Captain Marvel	Nominated	
Hugo Award	August 1, 2020	Best Dramatic Presentation – Long Form	Captain Marvel	Nominated	
Make-Up Artists & Hair Stylists Guild Awards	January 11, 2020	Feature-Length Motion Picture: Best Special Make-Up Effects	Brian Sipe, Alexei Dmitriew, Sabrina Wilson	Nominated	
MTV Movie & TV Awards	June 17, 2019	Best Hero	Brie Larson	Nominated	
MTV Movie & TV Awards	June 17, 2019	Best Fight	Brie Larson vs. Gemma Chan	Won	
MTV Movie & TV Awards	June 17, 2019	Best Musical Moment	"Just a Girl"	Nominated	
National Film & TV Awards	December 3, 2019	Best Actress	Brie Larson	Nominated	
National Film & TV Awards	December 3, 2019	Best Actress	Gemma Chan	Nominated	
National Film & TV Awards	December 3, 2019	Best Action Movie	Captain Marvel	Nominated	
Nebula Award	May 31, 2020	Ray Bradbury Award for Outstanding Dramatic Presentation	Anna Boden & Ryan Fleck & Geneva Robertson-Dworet	Nominated	
Nickelodeon Kids' Choice Awards	May 2, 2020	Favorite Movie	Captain Marvel	Nominated	
Nickelodeon Kids' Choice Awards	May 2, 2020	Favorite Movie Actress	Brie Larson (Note: Also for Avengers: Endgame (2019))	Nominated	
Nickelodeon Kids' Choice Awards	May 2, 2020	Favorite Superhero	Brie Larson	Nominated	
People's Choice Awards	November 10, 2019	Movie of 2019	Captain Marvel	Nominated	
People's Choice Awards	November 10, 2019	Action Movie of 2019	Captain Marvel	Nominated	
People's Choice Awards	November 10, 2019	Male Movie Star of 2019	Samuel L. Jackson	Nominated	
People's Choice Awards	November 10, 2019	Female Movie Star of 2019	Brie Larson	Nominated	
People's Choice Awards	November 10, 2019	Action Movie Star of 2019	Brie Larson	Nominated	
Saturn Awards	September 13, 2019	Best Comic-to-Film Picture	Captain Marvel	Nominated	
Saturn Awards	September 13, 2019	Best Actress	Brie Larson	Nominated	
Saturn Awards	September 13, 2019	Best Director	Anna Boden and Ryan Fleck	Nominated	
Teen Choice Awards	August 11, 2019	Choice Action Movie	Captain Marvel	Nominated	
Teen Choice Awards	August 11, 2019	Choice Action Movie Actress	Brie Larson	Nominated	
Teen Choice Awards	August 11, 2019	Choice Action Movie Actor	Samuel L. Jackson	Nominated	
Teen Choice Awards	August 11, 2019	Choice Movie Villain	Jude Law	Nominated	
Visual Effects Society Awards	January 29, 2020	Outstanding Compositing in a Photoreal Feature	Trent Claus, David Moreno Hernandez, Jeremiah Sweeney, Yuki Uehara for "Young Nick Fury"	Nominated	

The film was recognized with The ReFrame Stamp for hiring people of underrepresented gender identities, and of color.

== Sequel ==
The Marvels was released on November 10, 2023, with Nia DaCosta directing and Megan McDonnell writing the script. Larson reprises her role, and is joined by Iman Vellani as Kamala Khan / Ms. Marvel and Teyonah Parris as a grown-up Monica Rambeau, both reprising their roles from Disney+ series. Zawe Ashton appears as the villain.
