= E. Paul Larrat =

American pharmacist, epidemiologist, academic leader and researcher

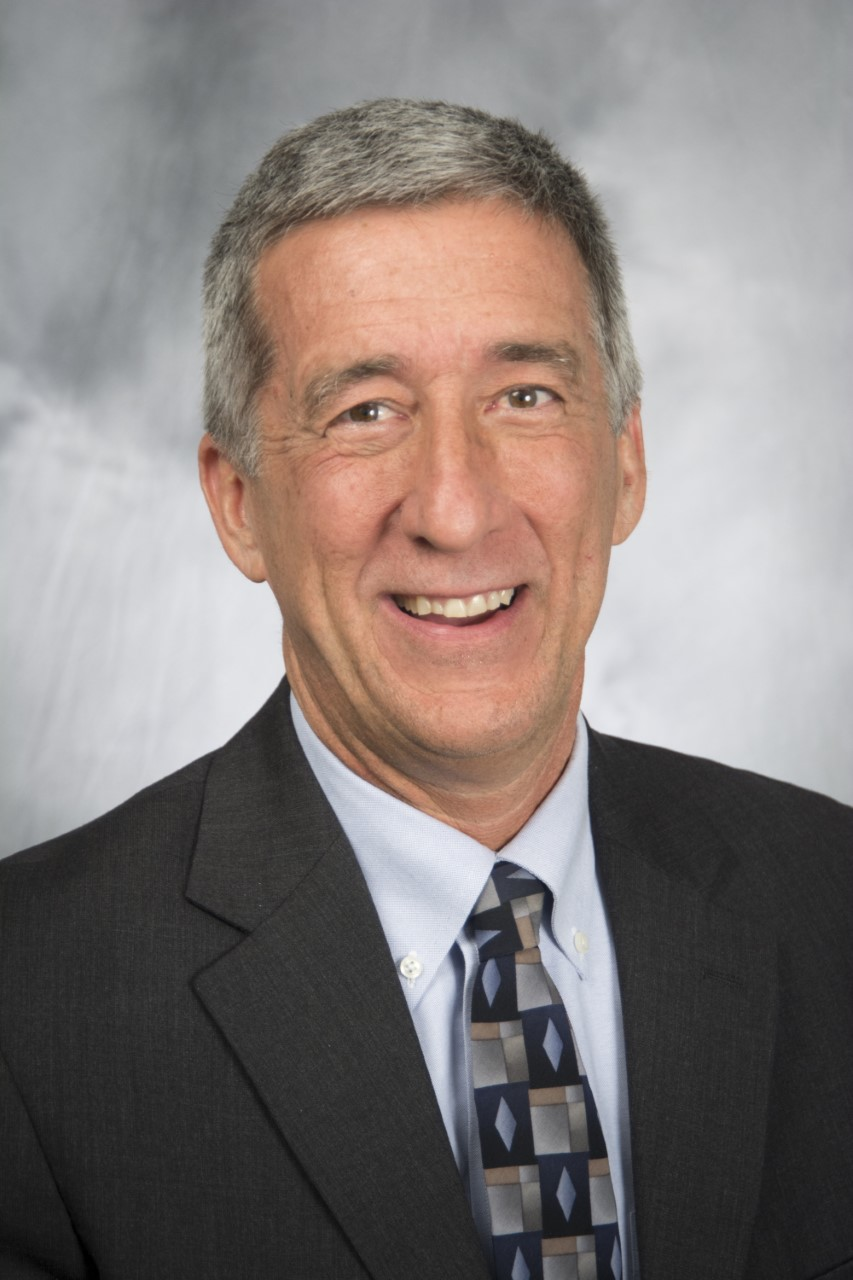
- Born: April 23, 1959 (age 67); Philadelphia, Pennsylvania
- Occupations: Pharmacist, epidemiologist, academic leader and researcher
- Awards: Bowl of Hygeia Pharmacist of the Year Award; Alzheimer’s Disease Community Service Award; American Cancer Society Courage Award; American Cancer Society Maldavir Leadership Award; Cornerstone Adult Services P. Bishop Covell Award; PBMI Rx Innovation Award; Life Member, Order of Lafayette

Academic background
- Education: B.Sc., Pharmacy; M.B.A., Management; M.Sc., Pharmacy Administration; Ph.D., Epidemiology
- Alma mater: University of Rhode Island; Brown University
- Thesis: Entangled Epidemics: Cocaine Use and HIV Disease (1992)

E. Paul Larrat is an American pharmacist, epidemiologist, academic leader and researcher. He is a dean and professor at the University of Rhode Island College of Pharmacy.

Larrat's research is focused on drug use in special populations, health policy, and health economics issues. He has authored/co-authored 9 books, 4 book chapters, over 40 refereed research articles and numerous refereed abstracts and publications.

== Education ==
Larrat studied at the University of Rhode Island and received his bachelor's degree in pharmacy in 1982, his Master of Business Administration in management in 1984, and a Master of Science in pharmacy administration in 1988. He then enrolled at Brown University and earned his Doctor of Philosophy in epidemiology and biostatistics in 1992.

== Career ==
Larrat held appointment as a pharmacist at Pawtuxet Valley Prescription and Surgical Centers, Inc., before joining the University of Rhode Island in 1983 as a teaching assistant of pharmacy administration, and as coordinator for the Brown Bag Prescription Project. From 1984 until 1992, he held appointment as coordinator of ambulatory care programs, director of pharmacy continuing education, and associate department chair at the University of Rhode Island College of Pharmacy. In 1992, he was appointed there as an assistant professor of epidemiology, and was promoted to associate professor in 1996, and became professor of epidemiology and associate dean in 2001. In 2013, he was appointed dean of the University of Rhode Island College of Pharmacy, and afterwards became the executive secretary of the RI Crime Laboratory Commission, the coordinating dean of the academic health collaborative and interdisciplinary neuroscience programs, and the interim executive director of the George and Ann Ryan Institute for Neuroscience.

In 2010–2011, Larrat served as health policy fellow for Senator Ron Wyden (D-Oregon) in the United States Senate.

== Research ==
Larrat has worked extensively on drug usage in special populations, drug safety, health policy, and health economics issues. He has also focused his research on the development of Alzheimer's Disease special care units. Following appointment as a faculty fellow at the National Aeronautics and Space Administration in 2004, Larrat engaged in research initiatives at the Space Life Science Laboratory at Kennedy Space Center in Florida. His work assessed the risks of volatile organic compounds (VOCs) on human and plant health in enclosed space environments during extended space travel.

=== Drug usage in special populations ===
In his study regarding the usage of drugs, Larrat focused on the interactions between cocaine exposure and HIV disease based on three mechanisms: the relationship between cocaine exposure and increased opportunity for HIV exposure, the direct role of cocaine in terms of altering susceptibility to HIV infection, and the influence that cocaine usage has in the context of the progression of HIV disease. He also published a paper in 1994 and explored the relationship between cocaine use and heterosexual exposure to human immunodeficiency virus (HIV).

Larrat documented the state policies regarding the legal use of marijuana for medicinal purposes, and also proposed the significance of understanding the laws regarding it. In 2014, he participated in a national case-control safety study that highlighted an increased hepatotoxicity risk associated with fluoroquinolone exposure in the study population.

=== Health economics issues ===
Larrat conducted a cross-sectional study and examined differences in context of average cost of pharmaceuticals among demographic variables. He also studied the opportunities available to academic pharmacoeconomic researchers, discussed the challenges which can inhibit the maturation of Pharmacoeconomics as a discipline, and also provided the potential strategies for addressing these challenges.

== Awards and honors ==
- 1982 - Eli Lilly Achievement Award
- 1988- Bowl of Hygeia - Pharmacist of the Year
- 1994 - Guido Pettinichio Pharmacist of the Year Award
- 1998 - American Cancer Society Courage Award
- 2001 - American Cancer Society Maldavir Leadership Award
- 2004 - Cornerstone Adult Services P. Bishop Covell Award
- 2009 - PBMI Rx Innovation Award
- 2016 - Life Member, Order of Lafayette

== Bibliography (selected) ==
- Larrat, E. P., & Zierler, S. (1993). Entangled epidemics: cocaine use and HIV disease. Journal of psychoactive drugs, 25(3), 207–221. https://doi.org/10.1080/02791072.1993.10472272
- Larrat, E. P., Zierler, S., & Mayer, K. (1994). Cocaine use and heterosexual exposure to human immunodeficiency virus. Epidemiology, 5(4), 398–403.https://doi.org/10.1097/00001648-199407000-00004
- Spore, D., Mor, V., Hiris, J., Larrat, E. P., & Hawes, C. (1995). Psychotropic use among older residents of board and care facilities. Journal of the American Geriatrics Society, 43(12), 1403–1409. https://doi.org/10.1111/j.1532-5415.1995.tb06622.x
- Spore, D., Mor, V., Hiris, J., Larrat, E. P., & Hawes, C. (1995). Psychotropic use among older residents of board and care facilities. Journal of the American Geriatrics Society, 43(12), 1403–1409.
- Spore, D., Mor, V., Larrat, E. P., Hiris, J., & Hawes, C. (1996). Regulatory environment and psychotropic use in board-and-care facilities: results of a 10-state study. The journals of gerontology. Series A, Biological sciences and medical sciences, 51(3), M131–M141.
- Larrat, E. P., Zierler, S., & Mayer, K. (1996). Cocaine use and HIV disease progression among heterosexuals. Pharmacoepidemiology and drug safety, 5(4), 229–236.
