= Ocean exploration =

Part of oceanography describing the exploration of ocean surfaces

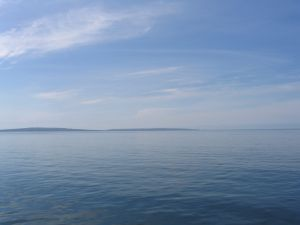
Atlantic Ocean

Ocean exploration, part of oceanography, is the exploration of ocean surfaces. Notable explorations were undertaken by the Greeks, the Phoenicians, the Romans, the Polynesians, Phytheas, the Vikings, Arabs and the Portuguese. Scientific investigations began with early scientists such as James Cook, Charles Darwin, and Edmund Halley. Ocean exploration itself coincided with the developments in shipbuilding, diving, navigation, depth, measurement, exploration, and cartography.

== History ==
=== Early exploration ===
- 4500 BC Around this time, humans began diving into the sea as a source of food gathering, commerce, and possibly even warfare.
- 4000 BC Egyptians developed sailing vessels, which were probably used only in the eastern Mediterranean near the mouth of the Nile River.
- 4000 BC - 1000 AD Polynesian colonization of South Pacific Islands.
- 1800 BC Basic measuring of the depths is done in Egypt.
- 1500 BC Middle Eastern people explored the Indian Ocean
- 600 BC Phoenicians developed sea routes around the entire Mediterranean and into the Red Sea and the Indian Ocean. Going around Africa they reached England by sailing along the western European coast. Although they understood celestial navigation, they probably stayed within sight of land whenever possible.
- 500-200 BC Greeks developed trade routes in the Mediterranean using the length of the day (corrected for the time of the year) to estimate latitude.
- 450 BC Herodotus produces a map of the Mediterranean region.
- 325 BC Pytheas, a Greek astronomer and geographer, sailed north out of the Mediterranean, reaching England and possibly even Iceland and Norway. He also developed the use of sightings on the North Star to determine latitude.
- c.240 BC Eratosthenes of Cyrene measures the circumference of Earth with a high precision.
- 150 AD Ptolemy produces a map of the Roman world, including lines of latitude and longitude, the continents of Asia, Europe, and Africa and the surrounding oceans.
- 900-1430 Vikings explore and colonize Iceland, Greenland, Newfoundland.
- 1002 Leif Erikson reaches North America nearly 500 years before Columbus.
- 1405-1433 Chinese send seven voyages to extend Chinese influence and impress their neighbor states. These expensive voyages are ended after a short time. See Zheng He (1371–1433).

=== From Age of Exploration to present ===
- 1492-1504 Christopher Columbus reaches America looking for a searoute to the Indies; discovering various lands and islands and establishing a colony on Hispaniola
- 1498 Vasco da Gama sails around Africa from Portugal reaching India and establishing trade routes
- 1499-1504 Amerigo Vespucci explores New World
- 1519-1522 Ferdinand Magellan's ships circumnavigate the world.
- 1620 Dutch inventor Cornelis Drebbel builds the world's first submarine and makes several trips in the River Thames near London at a depth of about 12 or 15 feet.
- 1698-1700 Edmund Halley made probably the first primarily scientific voyage to study the variation of the magnetic compass, sailing as far as 52 deg S. in the Atlantic Ocean. On a previous expedition to St. Helena, he made an important contribution to knowledge of the trade winds.
- 1768-1780 James Cook explores the southern parts of the oceans looking for the southern continent. He was the first to use a marine chronometer to determine longitude.
- 1785 Benjamin Franklin writes Sundry Marine Observations on improvements to ships and the Gulf Stream.
- 1831-1836 Charles Darwin sails on the Beagle, exploring the Galapagos and many other areas. It is this work which led him to develop the concepts of natural selection and evolution.
- 1860 First chart of the Gulf Stream published by the United States Coast Survey.
- 1872-1876 H.M.S. Challenger travels around the world on a scientific mission taking sediment samples, water samples, soundings, and collecting many biological specimens.
- 1960 Bathyscaphe Trieste dives to what was believed to be the deepest point in the Mariana Trench. A depth of 10,915 meters was observed.
- 1969 The Ben Franklin (PX-15) drifts submerged for 30 days in the Gulf Stream.

== See also ==
- Deep-sea exploration – Investigation of ocean conditions beyond the continental shelf
- Exploration – Investigating an unfamiliar area
- List of explorers
- List of maritime explorers
- Ocean – Body of salt water covering most of Earth
- Oceanography – Scientific study of the ocean
- Office of Ocean Exploration – US government scientific agency
- Timeline of maritime migration and exploration

== Sources ==
- NOAA, Interactive Timeline of significant and interesting events throughout the 200-year history of NOAA and its predecessor organizations.
- SeaSky.org - Ocean Exploration Timeline with Credits & Sources
- NOAA - Sounding Pole to Sea Beam
- History of Ocean Exploration
- USC Earth Sciences, History of Oceanography
- skb's virtual cave - Notable oceanographic expeditions
