= Catalina Martinez =

American oceanographer

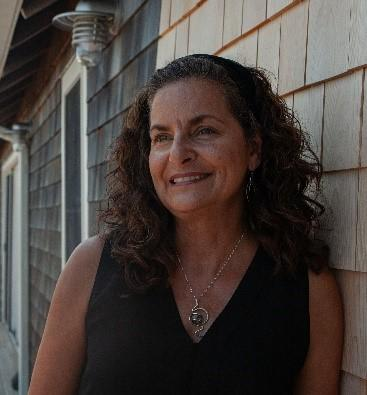
- Education: Bachelor of Science in Zoology, University of Rhode Island, 1996 Master of Science in Oceanography, University of Rhode Island, 1999 Master of Marine Affairs, University of Rhode Island, 2001 Master of Business Administration, University of Rhode Island, 2014
- Occupation: Regional Program Manager at NOAA's Office of Ocean Exploration and Research (OER)
- Years active: 2003-Present
- Website: https://www.uri.edu/features/catalina-martinez-97-m-s-00-m-m-a-02-m-b-a-15/

Catalina Martinez is a regional program manager for the National Oceanic and Atmospheric Administration's (NOAA) Office of Ocean Exploration and Research (OER). She attended the University of Rhode Island for both her undergraduate and graduate studies. She is currently based at the University of Rhode Island's Graduate School of Oceanography. Her career focuses on coordinating programs for NOAA as well as promoting diversity and inclusion for underrepresented communities in STEM.

== Early life and education ==
Martinez grew up in an urban community in Providence, Rhode Island. Martinez never received a high school diploma as she dropped out of school to support her family and work. Later, she received her GED as well as an associates degree from the New England Institute of Technology. Martinez would then take courses at various community college and then enroll at the University of Rhode Island to obtain a Bachelor's degree in Zoology. Continuing at the University of Rhode Island, she then gained 2 graduate degrees; a Master of Science in Oceanography and a Master of Marine Affairs. In 2002 shortly after graduating, Catalina Martinez would work as an intern at the NOAA Office of Ocean Exploration after being awarded the Knauss fellowship, a Sea Grant program connecting graduate students interested in the marine sciences with legislative and executive branch policy makers. Later in her career, Martinez would obtain another Masters degree in Business Management from the University of Rhode Island.

== Career ==
=== NOAA ===
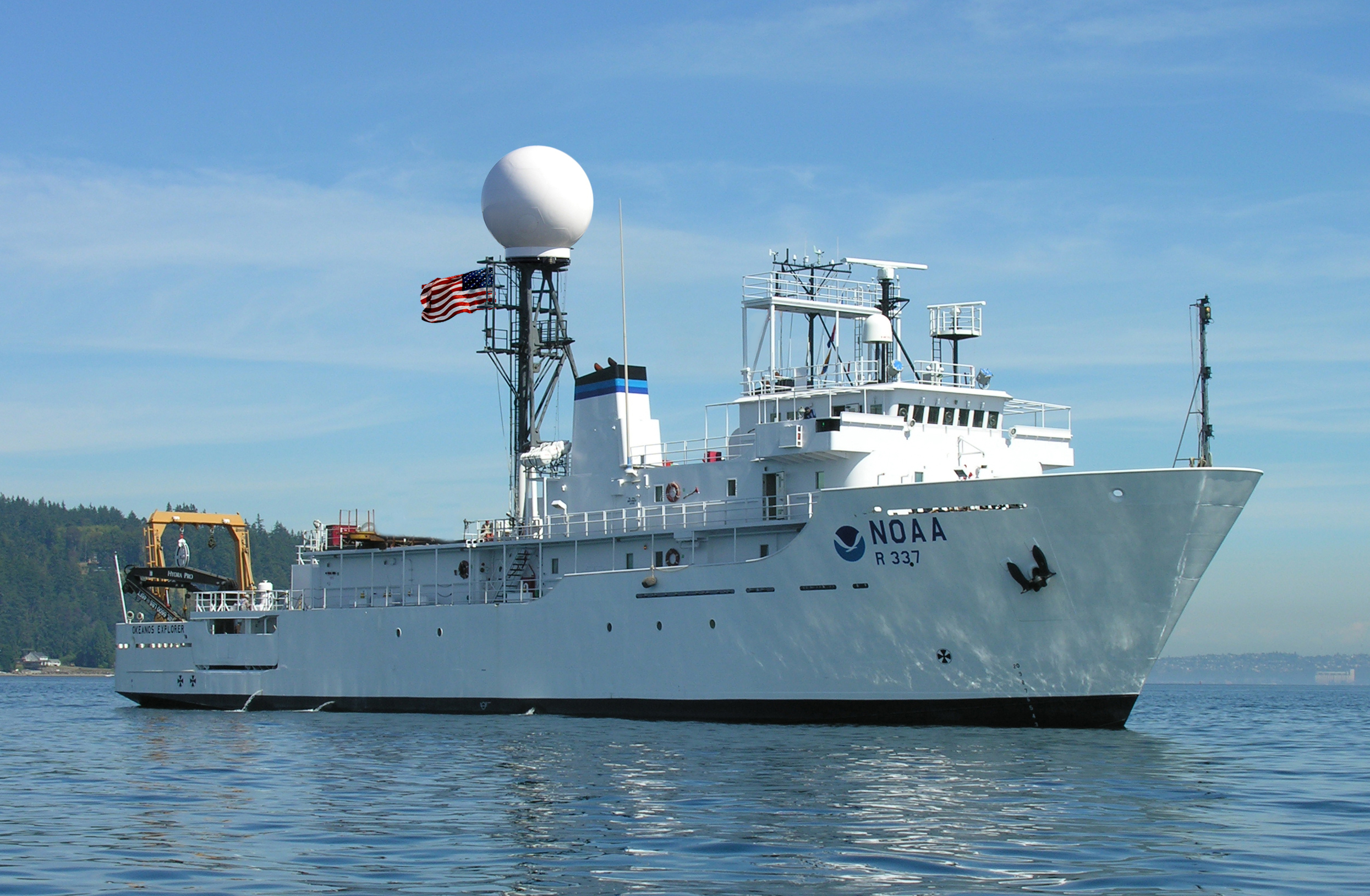
NOAA Ship, The Okeanos Explorer, used for student explorations at the URI

Catalina Martinez currently works as a Regional Program Manager at the NOAA's Office of Ocean Exploration and Research (OER), a position in which she's held since 2003 soon after her Knauss Fellowship internship. In this role, she established the regional office at the University of Rhode Island and maintained the partnerships between OER, the University of Rhode Island, and the Ocean Exploration Trust(OET). After receiving the Knauss Fellowship, Martinez worked as an intern at the NOAA Office of Ocean Exploration in Silver Spring, Maryland. Just a year later in 2003, NOAA hired Martinez where she helped spearhead the OER at the University of Rhode Island with oceanography professor and Ocean Exploration Trust founder, Robert Ballard. Here, she led and creating many programs aimed at reducing access barriers into NOAA and STEM fields for underrepresented communities. One program, partnered with the Inner Space Center and OET, offers students the opportunity to board the Okeanos Explorer and work with telepresence technology to explore unknown areas of the ocean and broadcast it to the internet. This program would ultimately go on to win Rhode Island the NOAA Cooperative Institute for Ocean Exploration. At the URI, Martinez also advocates for Justice, Equity, Diversity, and Inclusion (JEDI) champions that aims to promote success in STEM fields for underrepresented students. Efforts like this helped Martinez win the NOAA Diversity Award for Exemplary Service in 2016. In 2018, Martinez became the first Ocean Discovery Institute Living Lab Scientist to complete a residency, establishing a sea exploration program and discussing barriers to NOAA for young, marginalized communities.

=== Community outreach ===
Before earning her degrees, Martinez worked alongside the director of the Urban Collaborative Accelerated Program to start a school in the Providence area for students that are at risk of dropping out. Additionally, she worked as an overnight residence staff at the Women's Resource Center of South County, a shelter for women and children who suffered from abuse. Catalina Martinez has volunteered in various non-profit organizations dedicated to promoting diversity and conservation in Rhode Island including the Narrow River Land Trust, Rhode Island YWCA, and Tomaquag Indian Memorial Museum.

== Awards ==
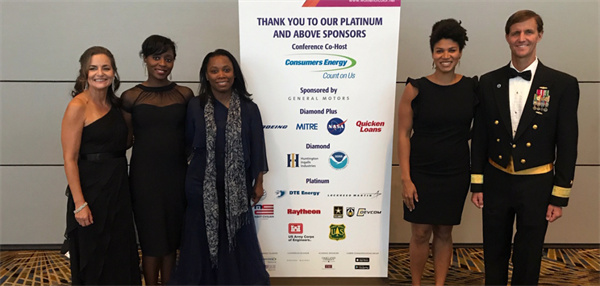
Catalina Martinez with other award winners at the 2019 annual Women of Color in STEM conference.

Various organizations have recognized Catalina Martinez's service to her community and advocating for diversity:

Year	Title	Institution	Ref.
2019	Women of Color Stem Award for Diversity Leadership in Government	Women of Color STEM	
2016	NOAA OAR/Equal Employment Opportunity(EEO)/Diversity Award for Exemplary Service	NOAA	
2015	URI Big Thinker	URI	
2015	Women of Achievement in Rhode Island	YWCA	
2013	Living Legends Award	Volunteer State Community College	
2011	Bronze Award	NOAA	
2010	Diversity Award for Staff Excellence in Leadership Service	URI	
2002	Dean John A. Knauss Marine Policy Fellowship	NOAA National Sea Grant College Program	

== Publications ==
- Martinez, C., Gorell, F., & Keener-Chavez, P. (2005). Reaching out in new ways: working with alternative schools and underrepresented groups to improve ocean literacy through the National Oceanic and Atmospheric Administration's Office of Ocean Exploration. Proceedings of OCEANS 2005 MTS/IEEE, 1, 900-904.
- Martinez, C., Coleman, D. F., Bell, K. L., Pinner, W., & Russell, C. W. (2012). Systematic Ocean Exploration Enabled by Telepresence Technology. New Frontiers in Ocean Exploration: The E/V Nautilus and NOAA Ship Okeanos Explorer 2011 Field Season, 25(1), supplement, 68, 6-7.
- Russell, C. W., Martinez, C., David, M., Kamphaus, CDR R., & Pica, CDR J. (2012). NOAA Ship Okeanos Explorer 2011 Field Season. New Frontiers in Ocean Exploration: The E/V Nautilus and NOAA Ship Okeanos Explorer 2011 Field Season, 25(1), supplement, 68, 46-49.
