= Debbie Berman =

South African film and television editor

- Born: 28 December 1978 (age 47); Johannesburg, South Africa
- Occupations: Television and film editor
- Years active: 2001-present

Debbie Berman is a South African film and television editor. She is best known for her editing work on multiple movies in the Marvel Cinematic Universe, including Spider-Man: Homecoming, Black Panther, and Captain Marvel.

== Life and career ==
She was born in Johannesburg, South Africa. She attended High School Victory Park, part of the King David Schools, and was introduced to video editing. She would edit films for school events and personal projects. She began editing television shows and movies in South Africa, before moving to Vancouver, Canada. After editing Space Chimps and Invictus, Berman moved to Los Angeles, where she was placed on the editing team for Spider-Man: Homecoming, Black Panther, and Captain Marvel.

In Spider-Man: Homecoming, Berman suggested re-shoots for scenes of Liz and Peter interacting to make Liz's character feel more genuine. While working on Black Panther, Berman convinced director Ryan Coogler to do reshoots on the final battle scene, to include the female Jabari warriors. She said that the film's style is based on James Bond and The Godfather and she began work on the production a few months later than the rest of the crew. In 2018, she was inducted into the American Cinema Editors Guild. Her most recent work includes being an editor for Love and Monsters, a monster adventure film released in October 2020.

In August 2020, it was announced that she will be making her directorial debut by directing an adaptation of Don Handfield and Joshua Malkin's graphic novel Unikorn, which was published in 2021.

== Filmography ==
=== Film ===
==== As editor ====
Year	Title	Director	Notes
2005	Within	John A. Curtis, Merlin Ward	
2008	Space Chimps	Kirk DeMicco	
2009	The Zero Sum	Raphael Assaf	Edited with Cheryl Buckman
2011	Touchback	Don Handfield	Edited with Ryan Eaton
2012	Black November	Jeta Amata	
2012	The United	Amin Matalqa	Unreleased
2015	The Final Girls	Todd Strauss-Schulson	
2017	Spider-Man: Homecoming	Jon Watts	Edited with Dan Lebental
2018	Black Panther	Ryan Coogler	Edited with Michael P. Shawver
2019	Captain Marvel	Anna Boden, Ryan Fleck	Edited with Elliot Graham
2020	Love and Monsters	Michael Matthews	Edited with Nancy Richardson

Berman was also credited as part of the editorial departments of Ripper 2: Letter from Within (2004), Reflection (2004), Good Session (2015), and The Jesuit (unreleased). She was the visual effects editor for In the Name of the King: A Dungeon Siege Tale (2007) and Invictus (2009).

=== Television ===
==== As editor ====
Year	Title	Notes
2001-02	Big Brother South Africa	
2003	Big Brother Africa	
2004	Making the Cut	
2009	Peak Season	Three episodes
2010-11	Haven	Six episodes)
2016	Mad Dogs	Three episodes)
2016	Timeless	One episode

== Awards and nominations ==
- 2012 recipient of the Sally Menke Editing Fellowship from the Sundance Institute.
- 2018 - Black Panther (nominated with Michael P. Shawver) - Saturn Award - "Best Editing"
- 2019 - Black Panther (nominated with Michael P. Shawver) - Alliance of Women Film Journalists - "Best Film Editing"
- 2019 - Black Panther (nominated with Michael P. Shawver) - Columbus Film Critics Association - "Best Film Editing"
