= Michael Shawver =

Film editor

Michael P. Shawver
- Born: 1984 or 1985 (age 41–42); Rhode Island, United States
- Education: University of Rhode Island '07; University of Southern California '12
- Occupation: Film editor
- Years active: 2013–present
- Known for: Black Panther (2018); Sinners (2025)
- Children: 1

Michael P. Shawver (born 1984 or 1985) is an American film editor who is known for his longtime collaboration with director Ryan Coogler. Shawver was nominated for an Academy Award for Best Film Editing for his work on Coogler's 2025 film Sinners.

Shawver met Coogler at the USC School of Cinematic Arts and began editing Coogler's student films, including the HBO-aired short "Fig". He went on to co-edit Coogler's major feature films, including Fruitvale Station (2013), Creed (2015), Black Panther (2018), and Black Panther: Wakanda Forever (2022). Their collaboration continued with Sinners, marking 15 years of partnership. Outside of his work with Coogler, Shawver has edited a range of feature films, including A Quiet Place Part II (2020), Honest Thief (2020), Blacklight (2022), and Abigail (2024).

== Early life and education ==
Shawver was born around 1984 or 1985 and grew up in North Providence, Rhode Island. He went to Greystone Elementary School then Ponaganset High School. Growing up, he had weekly family movie nights with his parents and older sister, through which he began to love films. At 12 years old, he made films with a VHS camcorder.

He went to the University of Rhode Island, where he majored in communications studies. He graduated from URI in 2007, and he searched online for "best film schools in the world" and decided to go to the Los Angeles–based USC School of Cinematic Arts. At USC, he enrolled in the Master of Fine Arts program. He met Ryan Coogler in 2009 in a directing class, learned about Coogler's short films in the making, and asked to help edit them. Shawver edited Coogler's student films, including "Fig", which aired on HBO. Shawver completed the MFA program in 2012.

As of 2025, he lives in Woodland Hills, California.

== Career ==
Shawver's first feature-film credit as editor came when Coogler began work on his first feature film Fruitvale Station with Claudia Castello involved as editor. Coogler recruited Shawver, and Castello and Shawver worked as a team. The two collaborated as editors again for Coogler's follow-up Creed. For Coogler's third feature film Black Panther, Shawver teamed with Debbie Berman, and the two worked on editing over 500 hours' worth of footage. Since Berman was one of the editors for the 2017 film Spider-Man: Homecoming, Shawver learned from her how to work with visual effects in editing.

Shawver collaborated with Coogler again on the 2025 film Sinners, a project that marked their 15-year partnership. He was nominated for an Academy Award for Best Film Editing at the 98th Academy Awards.

Shawver says he wants to write and direct a film set in his home state of Rhode Island.

== Filmography ==
Shawver's editing credits
Year	Title	Notes	Ref.
2013	Fruitvale Station	Edited with Claudia Castello	
2014	Tell		
2014	Warren		
2015	4th Man Out		
2015	Creed	Edited with Claudia Castello	
2017	All Summers End		
2017	Dirty Dancing		
2018	Black Panther	Edited with Debbie Berman	
2020	A Quiet Place Part II	Commercial release in 2021	
2020	Honest Thief		
2022	Blacklight		
2022	Black Panther: Wakanda Forever	Edited with Kelley Dixon and Jennifer Lame	
2024	Abigail		
2025	Sinners		

Shawver has also worked as an additional editor for the films Godzilla: King of the Monsters (2019), Lansky (2021), Creed III (2023), Better Man (2024), and I Know What You Did Last Summer (2025).

== See also ==
- List of University of Rhode Island people
