= Judith A. Boss =

American writer

- Occupations: Writer, researcher, lecturer, novelist
- Writing career
- Genres: Ethics, fiction
- Website: www.judyboss.com

Judith A. Boss is an ethicist and author of several college textbooks with McGraw-Hill Education, including THiNK, Ethics for Life, and Analyzing Moral Issues. She is also author of a romantic/suspense novel set in Antarctica titled Deception Island (Wild Rose Press, 2015) as well as a YA suspense novel titled Fall from Grace (Wild Rose Press, 2018).

== Biography ==
Judith Boss (née Wager) was born in the village of Honeoye Falls, south of Rochester, New York in the heart of wine country. She attended elementary school in Irondequoit, where her family moved when she was two.

When not in school, she enjoyed wandering the woods and fields around her home and picking beans for 25¢ a basket for Mr. King, who owned the truck farm behind her house. She also loved hiking and camping and was active in the Girl Scouts throughout high school.

An avid writer, when Judy was 11 years old she wrote and illustrated her first “novel," a story about her beloved parakeet “Sparky." My Little Sparky was followed by several other short novels and a book of poems.

Following graduation from high school, Judy attended the University of Rochester for a few years before dropping out and emigrating to Australia. Both of Judy’s daughters were born in Australia. She also finished her B.A. in philosophy and anthropology at the University of Western Australia.

From Australia, the family moved to Nova Scotia, Canada for graduate school. After graduate school, Judy worked for eight years as a writer/researcher for the Nova Scotia Museum. In 1979, Judy and her two daughters moved to Newport, Rhode Island where she continued to work as a writer. She also worked as a lecturer for several years at the University of Rhode Island before going back to full-time writing.

Judy currently lives in rural Rhode Island with her family. An avid traveler, she has traveled with students from the University of Rhode Island and Brown Medical School to work with underserved, indigenous people in Guatemala and Mexico. Her favorite travel destination, however, is Antarctica.

== Education ==
Boss earned a PhD in Social Ethics in 1990 from Boston University, a MSc in Human Development from the University of Rhode Island in 1991, and BA in Philosophy from the University of Western Australia in 1969. She was on the faculty of the Department of Philosophy at the University of Rhode Island from 1988 to 1995 and worked as Assistant Director of Curriculum Affairs at Brown University School of Medicine until 2004, when she "retired" to return to full-time writing. Boss is the author of ten books, including Deception Island a suspense novel, three short stories, and numerous articles in academic journals including The Journal of Moral Education, Public Affairs Quarterly, The Journal of Medical Ethics, Academic Medicine, Educational Theory, Free Inquiry, and The Journal of Experiential Education.

== Bibliography ==
- Fall From Grace (2018), The Wild Rose Press, ISBN 978-1509218257
- Deception Island (2015), The Wild Rose Press, ISBN 978-1628308686
- THiNK (2016), McGraw-Hill Education, ISBN 978-0078038433
- Ethics for Life (2018), McGraw-Hill Education, ISBN 978-0078038334
- Analyzing Moral Issues (2018), McGraw-Hill, ISBN 978-0078038440
- Healthcare Ethics in a Diverse Society (2001), co-author: Michael Brannigan, McGraw-Hill, ISBN 978-1559349765
- Perspectives in Ethics (1998), Mayfield Publishing Co.; (2000, 2003) McGraw-Hill, ISBN 978-0767420242
- The Birth Lottery (1993), Loyola University Press, Chicago, IL ISBN 978-0829407402
- "No, Virginia, there is no Santa Claus. Someone's been lying to you," Free Inquiry. 1992 (spring), 12: 52-53
- "Teaching ethics through community service." The Journal of Experiential Education. May 1995, vol. 18(1): 20-24
