= Bowl of Hygieia Award =

The Bowl of Hygeia Award is an award given by state, provincial, and national pharmacist associations in the United States and Canada to recognize living pharmacists who "possess outstanding records of civic leadership in their communities," while "[encouraging] pharmacists to take active roles in their communities." It is named from the Bowl of Hygieia.

The award was established in 1958 by E. Claiborne Robins Sr, president of A.H. Robins of Richmond, Virginia, and first presented by the Iowa Pharmaceutical Association at its annual convention.

In 1961, Robins's Bowl of Hygeia Award program expanded to Canada, and by 1967 it was being given by the pharmacists' associations in all 50 U.S. states as well as the District of Columbia, Puerto Rico, and all 10 Canadian provinces.

In 1989, American Home Products acquired A. H. Robins, and the company's Wyeth-Ayerst Laboratories division took over sponsorship of the award. (In 2002 AHP changed its name to Wyeth.)

Wyeth was acquired by Pfizer in 2009, and in 2010 the company transferred "all rights and responsibilities of the award" to the pharmacy profession as a whole. Today it is managed by the American Pharmacists Association (APhA), the National Alliance of State Pharmacy Associations (NASPA), and the APhA Foundation.

State, provincial, and national pharmacists' associations now each select and sponsor their annual Bowl of Hygeia winners.

The University of California, San Francisco School of Pharmacy, which is one of the nation's top-ranked pharmacy schools according to US News, bestows a Bowl Of Hygeia Award each year to a single graduating student from the School of Pharmacy. The student is selected by his or her classmates along with the faculty members and is selected based on which individual most exemplifies the desirable qualities of a pharmacist

In September 2015, a controversy erupted when an APhA Foundation-sponsored "Bowl of Hygeia" award was given to Louisiana pharmacist Lloyd Duplantis, who not only was a prominent figure in a movement of pharmacists who refused to dispense the birth control pill, but had self-published a book considered full of pseudo-scientific theories, the most notorious being a contention that high-dose estrogen birth control pills lead to an increase in "effeminate men" and homosexuality. The book also theorized that since these types of pills were tested in Haiti during the 1950s, by the 1970s a higher percentage of the population would be homosexual, and that a "unique population transfer" occurred during that time between Haiti and Zaire, where the AIDS virus had been created as a result of "errant vaccine experiments", so that the Haitians then contracted the virus and brought it to the Western Hemisphere. Despite calls for APhA to rescind this award, the organization has stood by its decision.

== International ==
The Pharmaceutical Society of Australia also presents a Bowl of Hygeia Award (note the slightly different spelling).
