= Office of Ocean Exploration and Research =

US government scientific agency

Agency overview
- Jurisdiction: US Federal Government
- Headquarters: Silver Spring, Maryland; 38°59′32.1″N 77°01′50.3″W
- Agency executive: Alan Leonardi, Director
- Parent scientific agency: National Oceanic and Atmospheric Administration
- Website: OceanExplorer.NOAA.gov

The Office of Ocean Exploration Research (OER) is a division of the United States National Oceanic and Atmospheric Administration (NOAA). It is run under the auspices of the Office of Oceanic and Atmospheric Research (OAR). The Office facilitates ocean exploration by supporting expeditions, exploration projects, and related field campaigns. The OER mission has four components:

- Mapping the physical, biological, chemical and archaeological aspects of the ocean;
- Understanding ocean dynamics at new levels to describe the complex interactions of the living ocean;
- Developing new sensors and systems to regain U.S. leadership in ocean technology;
- Reaching out to the public to communicate how and why unlocking the secrets of the ocean is well worth the commitment of time and resources, and to benefit current and future generations.
