= List of Pittsburgh Ironmen players =

The following is a list of players of the now-defunct Pittsburgh Ironmen professional basketball team.

- John Abramovic
- Moe Becker
- Mike Bytzura
- Joe Fabel
- Nat Frankel
- Gorham Getchell
- Coulby Gunther
- Noble Jorgensen
- Roger Jorgensen
- Tony Kappen
- Press Maravich
- Ed Melvin
- Red Mihalik
- Walt Miller
- John Mills
- Stan Noszka
- Harry Zeller
