= List of 1947–48 BAA season transactions =

This is a list of all personnel changes for the 1947 BAA off-season and 1947–48 BAA season.

== Retirements ==
Name	Team(s) played (years)	Age	Notes
Frank Baumholtz	Cleveland Rebels (1946–1947)	28	All-BAA Second Team (1947); Retired from playing basketball to pursue a career in baseball.
Harold Crisler	Boston Celtics (1946–1947)	23	Retired from playing basketball to pursue a career in American football.
Bob Dille	Detroit Falcons (1946–1947)	30	Hired as assistant coach for Valparaiso.
George Grimshaw	Providence Steamrollers (1946–1947)	27	Hired as coach for the University of Puerto Rico.
Matt Guokas	Philadelphia Warriors (1946–1947)	31	BAA champion (1947); Lost his right leg in an automobile accident during offseason.
Press Maravich	Pittsburgh Ironmen (1946–1947)	31	Hired as assistant coach for Davis & Elkins.
Ed Melvin	Pittsburgh Ironmen (1946–1947)	31	Hired as head coach for St. Bonaventure.
Doyle Parrack	Chicago Stags (1946–1947)	25	Hired as head coach for Oklahoma City.
Bob Rensberger	Chicago Stags (1946–1947)	26	Hired as head coach for Beloit Memorial HS.

== Player movement ==
=== Trades ===
April
April 29	To Boston Celtics: Cecil Hankins	To St. Louis Bombers: Wyndol Gray
October
October 27	To Boston Celtics: George Munroe; Cash	To St. Louis Bombers: John Abramovic
December
December 30	To Providence Steamrollers: Wyndol Gray	To St. Louis Bombers: Ariel Maughan
January
January 20	To Baltimore Bullets: Grady Lewis	To St. Louis Bombers: Irv Rothenberg
February
February 9	To Boston Celtics: Mike Bloom	To Baltimore Bullets: Connie Simmons

=== Free agency ===
Resignings were not tracked during the early days of the NBA, and the players listed below are only those who signed with a new team or who were not signed. Signing dates were also not recorded.

Player	New team	Former team
Carl Braun	New York Knicks	Colgate (undrafted in 1947)
Stan Brown	Philadelphia Warriors	Philadelphia Sphas (ABL)
Bill Downey	Providence Steamrollers	Great Lakes (Military)
Kleggie Hermsen	Baltimore Bullets	Toronto Huskies
Nat Hickey	Providence Steamrollers	Original Celtics (Independent)
Johnny Jorgensen	Chicago Stags	DePaul
Jerry Kelly	Providence Steamrollers	Boston Celtics
Red Klotz	Baltimore Bullets	Philadelphia Sphas (ABL)
Ray Kuka	New York Knicks	Montana State (undrafted in 1947)
Ariel Maughan	Providence Steamrollers	Detroit Falcons
Chet McNabb	Baltimore Bullets	Phoenix Funk Jewels (Independent)
Carl Meinhold	Baltimore Bullets	LIU Brooklyn
Paul Noel	New York Knicks	Kentucky
Bob O'Brien	Philadelphia Warriors	Elizabeth Braves (ABL)
Chick Reiser	Baltimore Bullets	Fort Wayne Zollner Pistons (ABL)
Lee Robbins	Providence Steamrollers	Colorado (undrafted in 1947)
Gene Rock	Chicago Stags	Birmingham Skyhawks (PBLA)
Jack Rocker	Philadelphia Warriors	Minneapolis Lakers (NBL)
Irv Rothenberg	Washington Capitols	Cleveland Rebels
Paul Seymour	Baltimore Bullets	Toledo Jeeps (NBL)
Sid Tanenbaum	New York Knicks	NYU (undrafted in 1947)
Mel Thurston	Providence Steamrollers	Tri-Cities Blackhawks (NBL)
Jack Toomay	Chicago Stags	Pacific
Chet Aubuchon		Detroit Falcons
Aud Brindley		New York Knicks
Chet Carlisle		Chicago Stags
Bob Cluggish		New York Knicks
Armand Cure		Providence Steamrollers
Bob Duffy		Boston Celtics
Don Eliason		Boston Celtics
Bob Faught		Cleveland Rebels
Frank Fucarino		Toronto Huskies
Gene Gallette		Washington Capitols
Bob Gantt		Washington Capitols
Gorham Getchell		Pittsburgh Ironmen
Mel Hirsch		Boston Celtics
Fred Jacobs		St. Louis Bombers
Tony Kappen		Boston Celtics
Ed Kasid		Toronto Huskies
Tom King		Detroit Falcons
Pete Lalich		Cleveland Rebels
Hank Lefkowitz		Cleveland Rebels
Al Lujack		Washington Capitols
Nat Militzok		Toronto Huskies
John Mills		Pittsburgh Ironmen
Bob Mullens		Toronto Huskies
George Pearcy		Detroit Falcons
Henry Pearcy		Detroit Falcons
Bob Shea		Providence Steamrollers
Fred Sheffield		Philadelphia Warriors
Ralph Siewert		Toronto Huskies
Deb Smith		St. Louis Bombers
Gino Sovran		Toronto Huskies
Buck Sydnor		Chicago Stags
Jake Weber		New York Knicks

=== Going to other American leagues ===
Player	New team	New league	BAA team
John Abramovic	Syracuse Nationals	National Basketball League	Baltimore Bullets
Herschel Baltimore	Wilkes-Barre Barons	American Basketball League	St. Louis Bombers
John Barr	Wilkes-Barre Barons	American Basketball League	St. Louis Bombers
Moe Becker	Atlanta Crackers	Professional Basketball League of America	Detroit Falcons
Al Brightman	Seattle Athletics	Pacific Coast Professional Basketball League	Boston Celtics
Harold Brown	Kansas City Blues	Professional Basketball League of America	Detroit Falcons
Mike Bytzura	Altoona Railroaders	All-American Professional Basketball League	Pittsburgh Ironmen
Tom Callahan	Stamford Pros	Connecticut State League	Providence Steamrollers
Don Carlson	Minneapolis Lakers	National Basketball League	Chicago Stags
Aubrey Davis	Oklahoma City Drillers	Professional Basketball League of America	St. Louis Bombers
Bill Davis	Grand Rapids Rangers	Professional Basketball League of America	Chicago Stags
Joe Fabel	Pittsburgh Pirates	Independent	Pittsburgh Ironmen
Warren Fenley	Brooklyn Gothams	American Basketball League	Boston Celtics
Bob Fitzgerald	Syracuse Nationals	National Basketball League	New York Knicks
Frido Frey	Paterson Crescents	American Basketball League	New York Knicks
Coulby Gunther	Atlanta Crackers	Professional Basketball League of America	Pittsburgh Ironmen
Charlie Hoefer	Saratoga Indians	New York State League	Boston Celtics
Tony Jaros	Minneapolis Lakers	National Basketball League	Chicago Stags
Harold Johnson	Kansas City Blues	Professional Basketball League of America	Detroit Falcons
Noble Jorgensen	Portland Indians	Professional Basketball League of America	Pittsburgh Ironmen
Wibs Kautz	Grand Rapids Rangers	Professional Basketball League of America	Chicago Stags
Ken Keller	Atlanta Crackers	Professional Basketball League of America	Washington Capitols
Harold Kottman	St. Paul Saints	Professional Basketball League of America	Boston Celtics
Frank Mangiapane	Paterson Crescents	American Basketball League	New York Knicks
Mike McCarron	Atlanta Crackers	Professional Basketball League of America	Toronto Huskies
Harry Miller	Atlanta Crackers	Professional Basketball League of America	Toronto Huskies
Walt Miller	Altoona Railroaders	All-American Professional Basketball League	Pittsburgh Ironmen
Leo Mogus	Youngstown Cubs	All-American Professional Basketball League	Toronto Huskies
Elmore Morgenthaler	Philadelphia Sphas	American Basketball League	Providence Steamrollers
Garland O'Shields	Syracuse Nationals	National Basketball League	Chicago Stags
Marty Passaglia	St. Paul Saints	Professional Basketball League of America	Washington Capitols
George Pastushok	Bridgeport Brass Bears	New England Basketball League	Providence Steamrollers
Petey Rosenberg	Pottsville Packers	Eastern Pennsylvania Basketball League	Philadelphia Warriors
Hank Rosenstein	Scranton Miners	Eastern Pennsylvania Basketball League	Providence Steamrollers
Ben Scharnus	Brooklyn Gothams	American Basketball League	Cleveland Rebels
Ossie Schectman	Paterson Crescents	American Basketball League	New York Knicks
Milt Schoon	Flint Dow A.C.'s	National Basketball League	Detroit Falcons
Nick Shaback	Cohoes Mastodons	New York State League	Cleveland Rebels
John Simmons	Kansas City Blues	Professional Basketball League of America	Boston Celtics
Lou Spicer	Wheeling Puritans	All-American Professional Basketball League	Providence Steamrollers
Art Stolkey	Grand Rapids Rangers	Professional Basketball League of America	Detroit Falcons
Virgil Vaughn	Trenton Tigers	American Basketball League	Boston Celtics
Red Wallace	Scranton Miners	Eastern Pennsylvania Basketball League	Toronto Huskies
Harry Zeller	Altoona Railroaders	All-American Professional Basketball League	Pittsburgh Ironmen

=== Purchases ===
Player	Date sold	New team	Former team	Ref.
Jerry Rullo	October 14	Baltimore Bullets	Philadelphia Warriors	
Kenny Sailors	November	Philadelphia Warriors	Chicago Stags	
Coulby Gunther	November 9	St. Louis Bombers	Providence Steamrollers	
Buddy O'Grady	November 22	St. Louis Bombers	Washington Capitols	
Kenny Sailors	November 22	Providence Steamrollers	Philadelphia Warriors	
Hank Beenders	January 15	Philadelphia Warriors	Providence Steamrollers	

=== Released ===
==== Waived ====
Player	Date waived	Former team	Ref
Elmore Morgenthaler	September 27	Providence Steamrollers	

== Draft ==
=== 1947 BAA draft ===
==== First round ====
Pick	Player	Signed	Team
1	Clifton McNeely	–	Pittsburgh Ironmen
2	Glen Selbo		Toronto Huskies
3	Bulbs Ehlers		Boston Celtics
4	Walt Dropo	–	Providence Steamrollers
5	Dick Holub		New York Knicks
6	Chink Crossin		Philadelphia Warriors
7	Jack Underman	–	St. Louis Bombers
8	Paul Huston		Chicago Stags
9	Dick O'Keefe		Washington Capitols
10	Larry Killick	–	Baltimore Bullets

==== Other picks ====
Player	Team
Johnny Ezersky	Providence Steamrollers
Elmer Gainer	Baltimore Bullets
Harry Gallatin	New York Knicks
Jack Hewson	Boston Celtics
Paul Hoffman	Baltimore Bullets
Bob Hubbard	Providence Steamrollers
Saul Mariaschin	Boston Celtics
Wataru Misaka	New York Knicks
Andy Phillip	Chicago Stags
Chick Reiser	Baltimore Bullets
Red Rocha	St. Louis Bombers
Ben Schadler	Chicago Stags
Gene Stump	Boston Celtics
Jack Tingle	Washington Capitols
Gene Vance	Chicago Stags

=== Dispersal drafts ===
The Detroit Falcons dispersal draft took place on July 9, 1947. The Cleveland Rebels, Toronto Huskies and Pittsburgh Ironmen dispersal draft took place on July 27, 1947.

==== Detroit Falcons ====
Player	Pos.	Nationality	New team	BAA years^{[a]}	Career with the franchise^{[b]}	Ref.
Harold Brown	G	United States	Philadelphia Warriors	1	–^{[c]}	
Bob Dille	F	United States	Toronto Huskies	1	–^{[c]}	
John Janisch	F/G	United States	Boston Celtics	1	1947	
Grady Lewis	F/C	United States	St. Louis Bombers	1	1947–1948	
Ariel Maughan	F	United States	Boston Celtics	1	–^{[c]}	
Stan Miasek	F	United States	Pittsburgh Ironmen	1	–^{[c]}	
Milt Schoon	C	United States	Philadelphia Warriors	1	–^{[c]}	

==== Cleveland Rebels ====
Player	Pos.	Nationality	New team	BAA years^{[a]}	Career with the franchise^{[b]}	Ref.
Frankie Baumholtz	G	United States	Providence Steamrollers	1	–^{[c]}	
Leon Brown	F	United States	St. Louis Bombers	1	–^{[c]}	
Bob Faught	F	United States	Philadelphia Warriors	1	–^{[c]}	
Hank Lefkowitz	F	United States	Baltimore Bullets	1	–^{[c]}	
George Nostrand	C/F	United States	Providence Steamrollers	1	1947–1949	
Mel Riebe	G/F	United States	Boston Celtics	1	1947–1949	
Ed Sadowski	C	United States	Boston Celtics	1	1947–1948	
Kenny Sailors	G	United States	Chicago Stags	1	1947	
Ben Scharnus	F	United States	Boston Celtics	1	–^{[c]}	
Nick Shaback	G	United States	Washington Capitols	1	–^{[c]}	
Ray Wertis	G	United States	Providence Steamrollers	1	–^{[c]}	

==== Toronto Huskies ====
Player	Pos.	Nationality	New team	BAA years^{[a]}	Career with the franchise^{[b]}	Ref.
Bob Dille	F	United States	Philadelphia Warriors	1	–^{[c]}	
Dick Fitzgerald	F	United States	Providence Steamrollers	1	1947	
Roy Hurley	F/G	United States	Washington Capitols	1	–^{[c]}	
Mike McCarron	G	United States	Providence Steamrollers	1	1949	
Harry Miller	C/F	United States	Boston Celtics	1	–^{[c]}	
Leo Mogus	F/C	United States	Baltimore Bullets	1	1948	
Bob Mullens	G	United States	Washington Capitols	1	–^{[c]}	
Dick Schulz	F/G	United States	Baltimore Bullets	1	1947–1948	
Red Wallace	G	United States	Washington Capitols	1	–^{[c]}	

==== Pittsburgh Ironmen ====
Player	Pos.	Nationality	New team	BAA years^{[a]}	Career with the franchise^{[b]}	Ref.
John Abramovic	F	United States	Boston Celtics	1	–^{[c]}	
Michael Bytzura	F	United States	Providence Steamrollers	1	–^{[c]}	
Coulby Gunther	F	United States	Providence Steamrollers	1	–^{[c]}	
Noble Jorgensen	C	United States	St. Louis Bombers	1	–^{[c]}	
Tony Kappen	G	United States	Providence Steamrollers	1	–^{[c]}	
Press Maravich	G	United States	Baltimore Bullets	1	–^{[c]}	
Stan Miasek	F	United States	Chicago Stags	1	1947–1950	
Stan Noszka	G	United States	Boston Celtics	1	1947–1949	
Harry Zeller	C/F	United States	Philadelphia Warriors	1	–^{[c]}	

== Notes ==
- ^{a} Number of years played in the BAA prior to the draft
- ^{b} Career with the franchise that drafted the player
- ^{c} Never played a game for the franchise
