= George Andrews (basketball) =

Canadian basketball player

- Born: September 18, 1917
- Died: May 26, 1999 (aged 81)

George Lloyd "Porky" Andrews (18 September 1917 – 26 May 1999) was a Canadian basketball player and a native of Victoria, British Columbia. He joined the University of Oregon Ducks for the 1939–1940 school year, and became one of the first Canadian players to showcase his talents in the United States.

== University of Oregon Ducks ==
When Andrews joined the team in 1939, the Ducks had just won the first NCAA men's basketball championship, defeating Ohio State 46-33 at Northwestern University.

=== 1939–1940 season ===
Andrews was coached during all three years by Howard Hobson, who coached the Ducks from 1936 to 1947. In the 1939–1940 season, Andrews played in 27 games while scoring 72 points for a 2.6 points per game (ppg) average. The team, and Andrews, played the 1940–41 campaign with an 18-18 record. Andrews averaged 6.4 points per game, while playing all 36 games, and scored 233 points total.

=== 1941–1942 season ===
Changes were made for the 1941 to 1942 season; Andrews, who had been jersey number 14, became jersey number 4, and was named team captain. Unfortunately, the Ducks had their first losing season in nearly 10 years with a 12-15 record. The last time that this had happened was in the 1932–1933 season, with a record of 8 wins and 19 losses. On a positive note, Andrews averaged 6.8 points per game (184 points in 27 games) in the 1941–1942 season, which was a career high. Andrews finished his collegiate career with a 5.4 points per game average, scoring 489 points in 90 games.

== Vancouver Hornets ==
After leaving the University of Oregon, Andrews suited up for the Vancouver Hornets in the Pacific Coast Professional Basketball League (PCPBL) from 1946 to 1948. Team members for the inaugural year were Norm Baker, Arthur Chapman, Reg Clarkson, Ken Lawn, Ritchie Nicol, Doug Peden and Sykes (first name unknown).

The Vancouver Hornets set a PCPBL record for the most points in a game during the 1947–48 season, with 97 points scored against the Astoria Royal Chinooks on December 27, 1947. The Hornets finished near the top rankings during both seasons, with records of 24-14 in the regular season and 6-6 in the playoffs (1946–47), along with 29-23 for the regular season in 1947–48.

=== 1946–1947 season ===
In the 1946–47 season, Andrews was one of two Canadians (the other being teammate Baker) to play in the World Professional Basketball Tournament (WPBT) with the Portland Indians. The Indians lost their only game to the Sheboygan Redskins, with a final score of 62-48. In this season, the Indianapolis Kautskys (led by Arnie Risen, future four-time NBA All-Star) would win the championship.

=== 1947–1948 season ===
Andrews' teammates for the 1947–48 Hornets campaign were Baker, Chapman, Lawn, Nicol, Bill (Stretch) Osterhaus, Peden, Dave Teyema, Jack Vaughn and Dean White. Out of these teammates, Baker has been considered the greatest player that Andrews had ever teamed with – he went on to fame in his own right with the Boston Whirlwinds and New York Celtics. The WBBT was sponsored by the Chicago Herald-American newspaper, and featured professional teams from the various professional leagues at the time.

== Canadian titles ==
Andrews went on to win several Canadian national titles, highlighted by the 1935 Victoria Blue Ribbons and the 1946 Victoria Dominoes. He was also a successful coach, and led the Victoria High School Totems to provincial titles in 1959, 1962 and 1969.
