= Bridgeport Brass Company =

Seven Centuries of Brass Making, published in 1900 by the Bridgeport Brass Company and covering the history of brass, readable pdf

The Bridgeport Brass Company is a former brass company in Bridgeport, Connecticut. It spun wire for the first telephone line which ran from New York City to Boston.

== History ==
Established in 1865, it made brass clock movements before expanding into production of hoopskirt frames, kerosene parlor lamps and kerosene bicycle lamps, incandescent lamp sockets, and copper wire. The company exhibited at the 1893 World's Fair in Chicago.

It is one of the Bridgeport companies featured on a print of the city's landmarks in 1882.

In January 1985, the company's employees, Seymour, Connecticut division signed an agreement to buyout the company from its owners to prevent its closure. By this point, the mill was 107 years old and in dire need of repairs and improvements.

Robert Lynn Lambdin did a mural for the company.

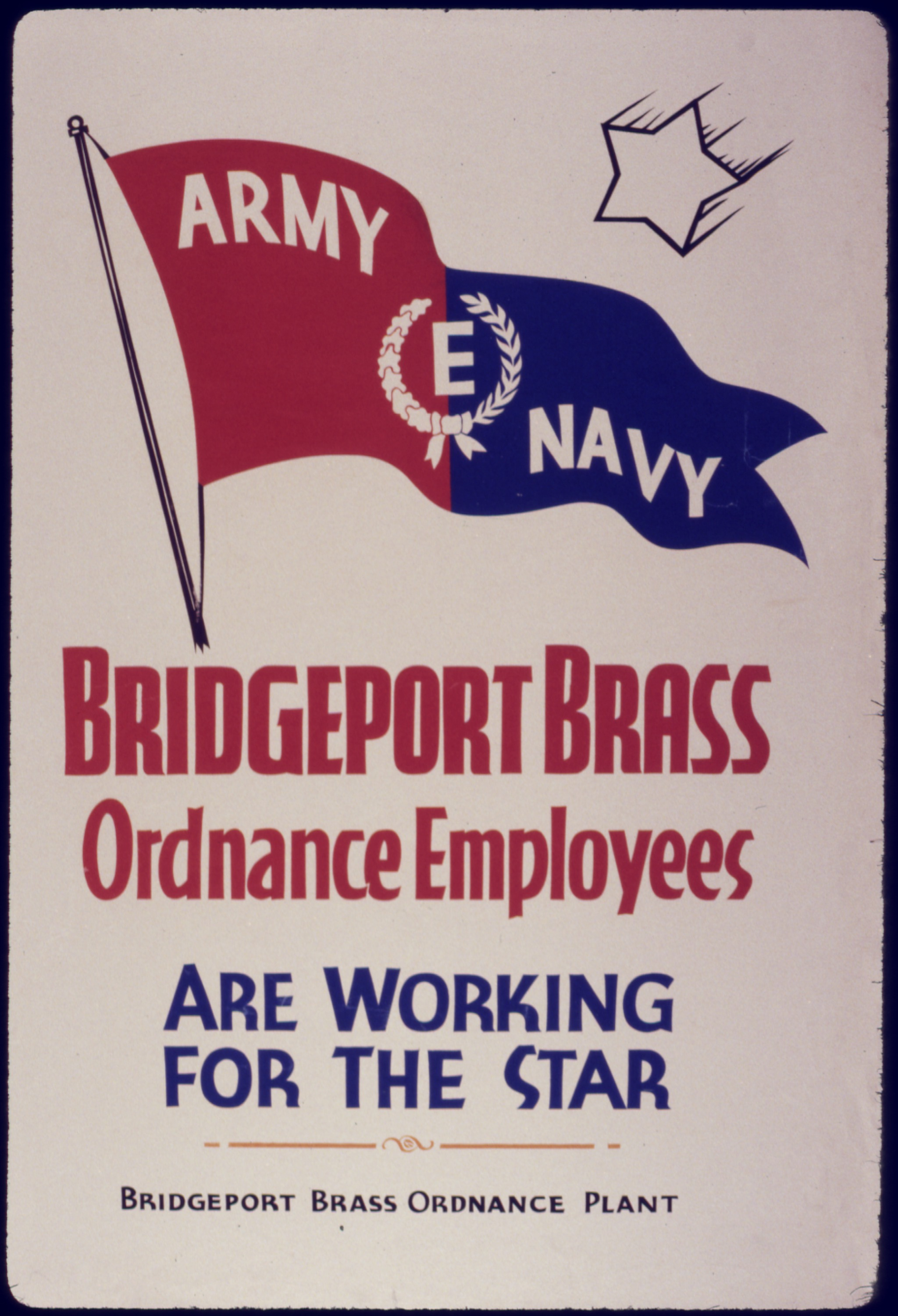
World War II era advertisement

The Zuni (rocket) was introduced around 1958 by its Hunter-Douglas division and was named after the North American tribe.

== See also ==
- Folding-Fin Aerial Rocket
- Mountain Grove Cemetery, Bridgeport
- List of 1947–48 BAA season transactions (Bridgeport Brass Bears)
- List of United States Supreme Court cases, volume 104
