= Swede Roos =

American basketball player and coach

Personal information
- Born: August 8, 1913 Chicago, Illinois, U.S.
- Died: January 30, 1979 (aged 65) Troutdale, Oregon, U.S.
- Listed height: 6 ft 1 in (1.85 m)
- Listed weight: 180 lb (82 kg)

Career information
- College: Illinois State University
- Playing career: 1935–1948
- Position: Small forward / shooting guard
- Coaching career: 1945–1948

Career history

Playing
- 1935–1936: Chicago Heights
- 1935–1936: Chicago Englewood
- 1936–1937: Whiting Ciesar All-Americans
- 1937–1942: Chicago Acme Steels
- 1942–1943: Dayton Dive Bombers
- 1943–1944: Chicago Gears
- 1944–1945: Chicago American Gears
- 1947–1948: Waterloo Pro-Hawks
- 1948: Portland Indians

Coaching
- 1945–1946: Chicago American Gears
- 1946–1947: Chicago American Gears (assistant)
- 1947: Waterloo Pro-Hawks
- 1948: Portland Indians

Harry Marshall "Swede" Roos Sr. (August 8, 1913 – January 30, 1979) was an American professional basketball player. He played for the Chicago American Gears in the National Basketball League, among other teams and leagues.

Roos also served as the head coach for the Chicago American Gears in 1945–46 and as an assistant in 1946–47. He then became a player-coach for the Waterloo Pro-Hawks of the Professional Basketball League of America in 1947 and for the Portland Indians of the Pacific Coast Professional Basketball League in 1948.
