= Paul Birch (basketball) =

American basketball player and coach

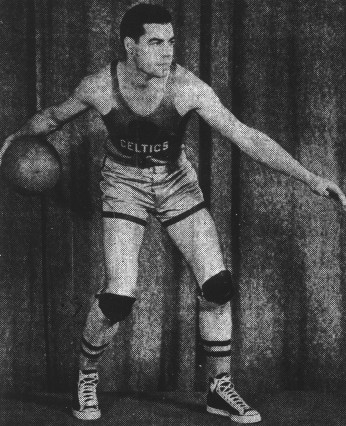
- Birch, circa 1938

Personal information
- Born: January 10, 1910 Homestead, Pennsylvania, U.S.
- Died: June 5, 1982 (aged 72) Pittsburgh, Pennsylvania, U.S.
- Listed height: 6 ft 1 in (1.85 m)
- Listed weight: 190 lb (86 kg)

Career information
- High school: Homestead (Homestead, Pennsylvania)
- College: Duquesne (1931–1934)
- Playing career: 1935–1948
- Position: Guard

Career history

Playing
- 1935-1938: New York Celtics
- 1938–1939: Pittsburgh Pirates
- 1941–1945: Fort Wayne Zollner Pistons
- 1945–1946: Youngstown Bears
- 1946–1948: Youngstown Cubs

Coaching
- 1945–1946: Youngstown Bears
- 1946–1947: Pittsburgh Ironmen
- 1951–1954: Fort Wayne Pistons

Career highlights
- 2× NBL champion (1944, 1945); All-NBL First Team (1939); First-team All-American – Converse (1935)

Paul Vincent "Polly" Birch (January 4, 1910 – June 5, 1982) was an American basketball player and coach.

== Life and career ==
A native of Pennsylvania, Birch attended Homestead High School where he played on the school's basketball team. He entered Duquesne University where he was a member of Duquesne Dukes men's basketball] team from 1931-1934. He was given All-America honors while he was there. From 1935-1938 he played for the New York Celtics and in 1938-1939 he was committed to the Pittsburgh Pirates. He then left professional ball for two years to coach the basketball team at his alma mater, Homestead High School.

Birch subsequently played for the Pittsburgh Pirates, Fort Wayne Pistons, and Youngstown Bears during the 1940s. He coached the now-defunct Pittsburgh Ironmen of the Basketball Association of America (a forerunner of the National Basketball Association (NBA)) in 1946, and the NBA's Fort Wayne Pistons from 1951 through 1954. Birch had played for the Pistons during the early 1940s, and the Youngstown Bears of the NBL.

He worked as a coach for the Woodland Hills School District as the coach of Rankin High School, leading the school to a state championship win in 1973.

== Career statistics ==
Legend
GP	Games played	FGM	Field goals made
FTM	Free throws made	FTA	Free throws attempted
FT%	Free throw percentage	PTS	Total points
PPG	Points per game	**Bold**	Career high

†	Denotes seasons in which Cable's team won an NBL championship
*	NBL leader

=== NBL ===
==== Regular season ====
Year	Team	GP	FGM	FTM	PTS	PPG
1938–39†	Pittsburgh	22	**85**	**51**	**221**	**10.0**
1941–42	Fort Wayne Z.P.	8	16	10	42	5.3
1942–43	Fort Wayne Z.P.	23*	29	20	78	3.4
1943–44†	Fort Wayne Z.P.	22*	27	17	71	3.2
1944–45†	Fort Wayne Z.P.	28	29	7	65	2.3
1945–46	Youngstown	**31**	35	26	96	3.1
Career		134	221	131	573	4.3

==== Playoffs ====
Year	Team	GP	FGM	FTM	PTS	PPG
1942	Fort Wayne Z.P.	**6**	**15**	**7**	**37**	**6.2**
1943	Fort Wayne Z.P.	**6**	3	2	8	1.3
1944†	Fort Wayne Z.P.	5	7	2	16	3.2
1945†	Fort Wayne Z.P.	3	2	3	7	2.3
Career		20	27	14	68	3.4

== Head coaching record ==
Legend
Regular season	G	Games coached	W	Games won	L	Games lost	W–L %	Win–loss %
Playoffs	PG	Playoff games	PW	Playoff wins	PL	Playoff losses	PW–L %	Playoff win–loss %

=== BAA/NBA ===
Team	Year	G	W	L	W–L%	Finish	PG	PW	PL	PW–L%	Result
Pittsburgh	1946–47	60	15	45	.250	5th in Western	—	—	—	—	Missed playoffs
Fort Wayne	1951–52	66	29	37	.439	4th in Western	2	0	2	.000	Lost in Division semifinals
Fort Wayne	1952–53	69	36	33	.522	3rd in Western	8	4	4	.500	Lost in Division finals
Fort Wayne	1953–54	72	40	32	.556	3rd in Western	4	0	4	.000	Lost in Division round-robin
Career		267	120	147	.449		14	4	10	.286	
