= 1946–47 Pittsburgh Ironmen season =

- Head coach: Paul Birch
- Owner: John Harris
- Arena: Duquesne Gardens

Results
- Record: 15–45 (.250)
- Place: Division: 5th (Western)
- Playoff finish: Did not qualify
- Stats at Basketball Reference
- Radio: KDKA

The 1946–47 Pittsburgh Ironmen season was the only season of play for the Pittsburgh Ironmen of the Basketball Association of America. They finished with a record of 15–45, which was the worst record a team had in the inaugural BAA/NBA season. Despite the terrible record the Ironmen had, the team's owners did express interest in returning to play for another season, but they ultimately became one of four inaugural BAA teams to fold operations after their first season concluded due to the team failing to find extra help to make sure their operations survived for the long-term. Greater details on their first and only season would be explored in Charley Rosen's book called "The First Tip-Off: The Incredible Story of the Birth of the NBA", with an entire chapter dedicated to the Ironmen's woes and troubles in their only season of play within the BAA (especially with their head coaching issues involving perfectionism that stemmed from Paul Birch's playing days back when he was a professional basketball player (to the point where a rule implemented by the BAA during the season felt like it was being targeted against Birch and the Ironmen specifically) and their slippery basketball court problems that would be an issue for most of the league this season, not just the Ironmen specifically) that ultimately lead them to their quick downfall following their only season of play. Out of the four inaugural BAA/NBA teams to lose their franchise this season, Pittsburgh would be the only location to still not have a new franchise return to the city in question, though an opportunity previously arrived for the city back in the 1960s in the NBA and Pittsburgh would have an American Basketball Association team in the late 1960s and early 1970s called the Pittsburgh Pipers / Condors (winning that rivaling league's inaugural championship as the Pipers) before folding alongside The Floridians franchise in 1972.

== Roster ==
Due to this being the first and only season in the franchise's history, the BAA didn't utilize a draft system like they would in future seasons of the BAA/NBA and instead relied upon some combination of the head coach and the general manager of the team finding and signing players in time to start out their training camp period for the season. For the Ironmen, head coach Paul Birch had a late start in acquiring players due to him being signed by the Ironmen late in the preseason (about four weeks left before the regular season officially began), meaning his player acquisitions had essentially been players acquired from his original team he had coached from the older National Basketball League in the Youngstown Bears (Press Maravich from Davis & Elkins College, Stan Noszka from Duquesne University, Moe Becker from Duquesne University, John Abramovic from Salem College, and Walt Miller from Duquesne University) alongside players from nearby Duquesne University (Stan Noszka, Moe Becker, Ed Melvin, Walt Miller, and technically Mike Bytzura with him transferring from Duquesne to Long Island University at the time due to him being offered a more lucrative scholarship during that period of time) and the University of Pittsburgh (Joe Fabel and Harry Zeller, the latter only recently coming out of Washington & Jefferson College at the time) to start out their regular season.

1946–47 Pittsburgh Ironmen roster
Players

Pos.	No.	Player	Height	Weight	DOB	From
F	3	John Abramovic	6 ft 3 in (1.91 m)	195 lb (88 kg)	1919-02-09	Salem International
F	4	Michael Bytzura	6 ft 1 in (1.85 m)	170 lb (77 kg)	1922-06-18	LIU Brooklyn
G/F	15	Joe Fabel	6 ft 1 in (1.85 m)	190 lb (86 kg)	1913-09-04	Pittsburgh
G/F	15	Nat Frankel	6 ft 0 in (1.83 m)	195 lb (88 kg)	1913-11-03	Brooklyn
C	9	Gorham Getchell	6 ft 4 in (1.93 m)	205 lb (93 kg)	1920-08-14	Temple
F	6	Coulby Gunther	6 ft 4 in (1.93 m)	190 lb (86 kg)	1923-02-05	Boston College
C	17	Noble Jorgensen	6 ft 9 in (2.06 m)	228 lb (103 kg)	1925-05-18	Iowa
F/C	7	Roger Jorgensen	6 ft 5 in (1.96 m)	200 lb (91 kg)	1920-09-02	Ohio State
G	5	Tony Kappen	5 ft 10 in (1.78 m)	165 lb (75 kg)	1919-04-13	Forest Hills HS (NY)
G	12	Press Maravich	6 ft 0 in (1.83 m)	185 lb (84 kg)	1920-08-20	Davis & Elkins
G		Ed Melvin	5 ft 9 in (1.75 m)	170 lb (77 kg)	1916-02-13	Duquesne
G	6	Red Mihalik	6 ft 0 in (1.83 m)	180 lb (82 kg)	1916-09-22	Ford City HS (PA)
F	7	Walt Miller	6 ft 2 in (1.88 m)	190 lb (86 kg)	1915-07-30	Duquesne
F/C	11	John Mills	6 ft 8 in (2.03 m)	203 lb (92 kg)	1919-09-07	Western Kentucky
G	8	Stan Noszka	6 ft 1 in (1.85 m)	185 lb (84 kg)	1920-09-09	Duquesne
F/C	14−18	Harry Zeller	6 ft 4 in (1.93 m)	210 lb (95 kg)	1919-07-10	Washington & Jefferson

Coaches
Head coach

Paul Birch

Legend
- (DP) Unsigned draft pick
- (FA) Free agent
- (S) Suspended
- Injured

Roster

== Regular season ==
=== Season standings ===
#	Western Division				
#	Team	W	L	PCT	GB
1	x-Chicago Stags	39	22	.639	–
2	x-St. Louis Bombers	38	23	.623	1
3	x-Cleveland Rebels	30	30	.500	8.5
4	Detroit Falcons	20	40	.333	18.5
5	Pittsburgh Ironmen	15	45	.250	23.5

=== Game log ===
1946–47 game log
Total: 15–45
November

Game	Date	Team	Score	High points	Location Attendance	Record
1	November 2	@ St. Louis	L 51–56	Harry Zeller (10)		0–1
2	November 4	Washington	L 56–71	John Abramovic (22)		0–2
3	November 7	@ Philadelphia	L 75–81	Moe Becker (20)		0–3
4	November 9	@ Providence	L 66–76	John Abramovic (16)		0–4
5	November 11	Providence	W 84–71	John Abramovic (26)		1–4
6	November 16	@ New York	L 62–64 (OT)	John Abramovic (29)		1–5
7	November 18	Toronto	W 54–48	John Abramovic (22)		2–5
8	November 20	@ Detroit	W 54–53	Ed Melvin (13)		3–5
9	November 24	@ Cleveland	L 60–62	John Abramovic (14)		3–6
10	November 25	New York	L 46–62	Stan Noszka (10)		3–7
11	November 27	Cleveland	W 62–60	Becker, Mills (11)		4–7
12	November 28	@ Boston	L 55–59	Abramovic, Melvin, Mills (8)		4–8
13	November 30	@ Washington	L 40–49	Michael Bytzura (9)		4–9

December

Game	Date	Team	Score	High points	Location Attendance	Record
14	December 2	Boston	L 44–46	Harry Zeller (11)		4–10
15	December 4	Chicago	L 46–57	Abramovic, Bytzura (11)		4–11
16	December 5	@ St. Louis	L 55–66	John Abramovic (15)		4–12
17	December 9	Detroit	L 58–66	John Abramovic (17)		4–13
18	December 13	@ Toronto	W 62–52	Coulby Gunther (17)		5–13
19	December 15	@ Chicago	L 75–84	Coulby Gunther (17)		5–14
20	December 16	St. Louis	L 55–66	Coulby Gunther (19)		5–15
21	December 22	Cleveland	W 78–74 (OT)	Gunther, Kappen, Noszka, Zeller (16)		6–15
22	December 23	Boston	W 64–54	Stan Noszka (13)		7–15
23	December 26	@ Philadelphia	L 46–53	Stan Noszka (13)		7–16
24	December 30	Philadelphia	L 60–62	Coulby Gunther (20)		7–17

January

Game	Date	Team	Score	High points	Location Attendance	Record
25	January 1	Cleveland	L 48–61	Harry Zeller (10)		7–18
26	January 6	Washington	L 49–63	Coulby Gunther (21)		7–19
27	January 8	Philadelphia	W 67–63	Coulby Gunther (25)		8–19
28	January 12	@ St. Louis	L 59–72	Coulby Gunther (20)		8–20
29	January 13	New York	L 50–53	Stan Noszka (18)		8–21
30	January 15	Providence	W 65–53	Stan Noszka (20)		9–21
31	January 20	Detroit	W 62–57	Stan Noszka (25)		10–21
32	January 23	@ Boston	L 43–48	Coulby Gunther (14)		10–22
33	January 25	@ Washington	L 71–84	Harry Zeller (18)		10–23
34	January 27	Providence	W 71–63	Coulby Gunther (26)		11–23
35	January 29	@ New York	L 60–64	Gunther, Kappen (11)		11–24
36	January 30	@ Boston	L 51–66	Coulby Gunther (16)		11–25

February

Game	Date	Team	Score	High points	Location Attendance	Record
37	February 1	@ Providence	L 73–89	Tony Kappen (19)		11–26
38	February 3	St. Louis	W 68–63	John Abramovic (18)		12–26
39	February 5	Toronto	L 55–58	Coulby Gunther (17)		12–27
40	February 6	@ Chicago	L 85–109	Press Maravich (18)		12–28
41	February 8	@ Detroit	L 58–64	Coulby Gunther (17)		12–29
42	February 10	Washington	W 75–69	Coulby Gunther (24)		13–29
43	February 12	Chicago	L 82–101	John Abramovic (20)		13–30
44	February 14	@ Toronto	L 73–84	John Abramovic (18)		13–31
45	February 15	@ Providence	L 72–82	Coulby Gunther (32)		13–32
46	February 17	Detroit	W 63–59	Coulby Gunther (20)		14–32
47	February 20	@ Philadelphia	L 66–78	John Abramovic (18)		14–33
48	February 21	@ New York	L 49–77	Coulby Gunther (14)		14–34
49	February 22	@ Washington	L 61–93	Press Maravich (15)		14–35
50	February 24	Philadelphia	L 67–69	Coulby Gunther (17)		14–36
51	February 26	Cleveland	L 53–74	Stan Noszka (16)		14–37

March

Game	Date	Team	Score	High points	Location Attendance	Record
52	March 3	Chicago	L 66–69	Stan Noszka (18)		14–38
53	March 5	Toronto	L 60–63	Coulby Gunther (27)		14–39
54	March 6	@ Chicago	L 71–72	Coulby Gunther (21)		14–40
55	March 11	@ Cleveland	L 72–78	Coulby Gunther (30)		14–41
56	March 18	@ Toronto	W 70–64	Coulby Gunther (22)		15–41
57	March 19	St. Louis	L 54–79	John Abramovic (12)		15–42
58	March 22	@ Detroit	L 65–85	Coulby Gunther (20)		15–43
59	March 24	New York	L 51–65	Coulby Gunther (13)		15–44
60	March 26	Boston	L 61–74	Coulby Gunther (16)		15–45

== Transactions ==
=== Trades ===
December 12, 1946	To Pittsburgh Ironmen Tony Kappen	To Boston Celtics Moe Becker

== Season losses ==
Throughout this season, the Pittsburgh Ironmen only had an average total of 1,363 paid attendees per game, with net receipts totaling up to $56,005 for the season and estimated losses totaling up to around $200,000 for this season. Despite the high amount of money lost during that period of time and the poor record they had this season, the Ironmen had intended on staying on board for at least another season while playing in the BAA, but only if "a representative team can be secured". After they had participated in the inaugural 1947 BAA draft and held the inaugural #1 pick of the draft there, the Ironmen would end up joining the Cleveland Rebels, Detroit Falcons, and Toronto Huskies as one of the four inaugural BAA teams to fold operations by the end of this season.

== Dispersal Draft ==
During the first ever end of season meeting for the Basketball Association of America's board of governors held on May 21, 1947, the Ironmen confirmed that they would continue playing in the league for another season, but only if "a representative team can be secured". As such, the Ironmen were able to participate in the inaugural 1947 BAA draft thinking they could get exactly that. During their only draft they ever did, the Ironmen would select Clifton McNeely from Texas Wesleyan College (now Texas Wesleyan University) as the league's first ever #1 pick (though he would never play for the BAA/NBA whatsoever), as well as draft Fritz Nagy from the Municipal University of Akron (now University of Akron), Bob Alamo from the University of Santa Clara (now Santa Clara University), George Brown from Monessen High School and (presumably speaking) the University of Pittsburgh, Dick Ives from the University of Iowa, Herman Knoche from Washington & Jefferson College, and Jack Walton from DePauw University. However, when Pittsburgh failed to get what they needed from the Basketball Association of America (BAA), they would fold from the BAA entirely on July 27, 1947. After the Ironmen joined the Toronto Huskies in disbanding their franchises altogether on that July 27 date, the remaining eight teams left in the BAA (the surviving seven teams from the league's first successful season alongside the original Baltimore Bullets franchise that came from the original American Basketball League by a dispute with that league) entered into what became its first ever dispersal draft on August 2 that year, with each team taking players that were originally from the previously disbanded Cleveland Rebels and Detroit Falcons franchises alongside the Ironmen and Huskies franchises. The following teams acquired these players from the Ironmen during the dispersal draft period.

- Baltimore Bullets: Press Maravich
- Boston Celtics: John Abramovic & Stan Noszka
- Philadelphia Warriors: Harry Zeller
- Providence Steamrollers: Mike Bytzura, Coulby Gunther, & Tony Kappen
- St. Louis Bombers: Noble Jorgensen
