= Merrell v. Tice =

- Supreme Court of the United States
- Full case name: Merrell v. Tice
- Citations: 104 U.S. 557 (more) 14 Otto 557; 26 L. Ed. 854

Holding
- Because statutory procedures exist for producing evidence of copyright formality observance, evidence of at least such veracity is required to prove copyright claims.

Merrell v. Tice, 104 U.S. 557 (1881), was a United States Supreme Court ruling dealing with copyright. At the time, a prerequisite for having a copyright was delivering two copies of the material to the Library of Congress within a time limit. Tice sued Merrell for copyright infringement and the lower courts were sympathetic; he just had to prove that he had observed that prerequisite. As evidence, Tice presented notes purportedly from the Library of Congress that certified that he had sent the book to the Library on time. Appeals of the case eventually landed it in the Supreme Court.

The Court determined that the letter was an example of what he would need, but was not sufficient to prove his case. Because there were statutory procedures for obtaining more suitable evidence from the Library of Congress and the Post Office, the Court overturned the lower court ruling and ordered that the case be retried.
