= John Mandic =

American basketball player

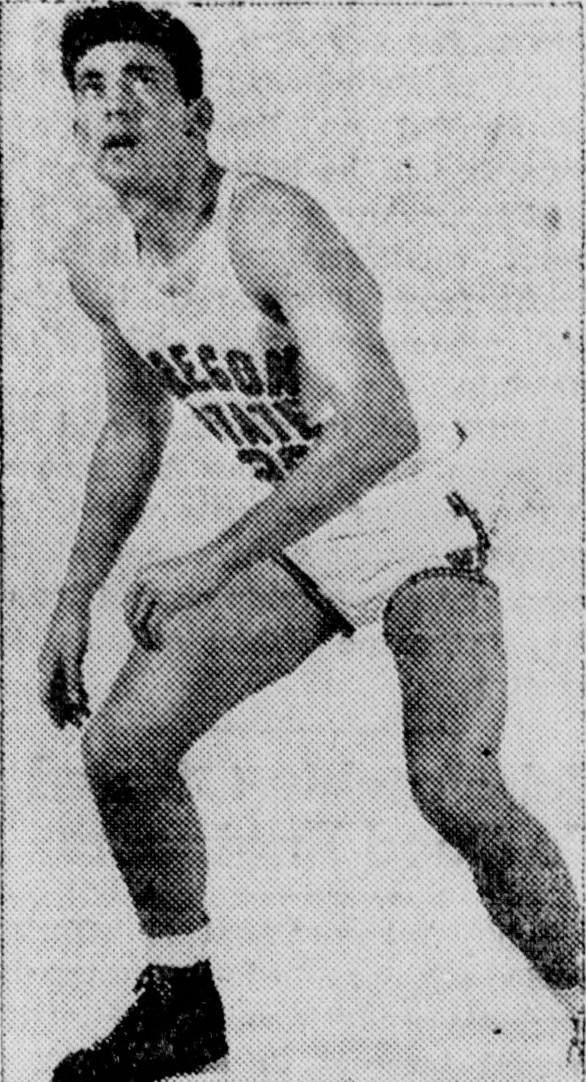
- Mandic, circa 1941

Personal information
- Born: October 3, 1919 Los Angeles, California, U.S.
- Died: June 22, 2003 (aged 83) Portland, Oregon, U.S.
- Listed height: 6 ft 4 in (1.93 m)
- Listed weight: 205 lb (93 kg)

Career information
- High school: Roosevelt (Los Angeles, California)
- College: Oregon State (1939–1942)
- NBA draft: 1947: 9th round, 74th overall pick
- Drafted by: Washington Capitols
- Playing career: 1946–1950
- Position: Power forward / center
- Number: 50, 12, 17

Career history
- 1946–1947: Portland Indians
- 1947–1948: Rochester Royals
- 1948–1949: Indianapolis Jets
- 1949–1950: Washington Capitols
- 1950: Baltimore Bullets

Career highlights
- Consensus second-team All-American (1942); First-team All-PCC (1942); California Mr. Basketball (1938)

Career BAA and NBA statistics
- Points: 335 (4.1 ppg)
- Assists: 88 (1.1 apg)
- Stats at NBA.com
- Stats at Basketball Reference

John Joseph Mandic (October 3, 1919 – June 22, 2003) was an American professional basketball player of Croatian origin. He played college basketball for the Oregon State Beavers from 1939 to 1942. He played for the Portland Indians of the Pacific Coast Professional Basketball League in the team's debut season in 1946–47, and was drafted by the Washington Capitols in the 1947 BAA draft after the season had finished. Instead of playing for the Capitols, he instead signed with the Rochester Royals of the National Basketball League and played for the team for one season. He joined the Indianapolis Jets for the 1948–49 BAA season. He was sold to the Capitols, the team that had drafted him two years prior, on August 13, 1949. After playing 22 games with the Capitols, he was waived, and signed with the Baltimore Bullets, but only managed three games with the team before retiring from playing basketball.

== BAA/NBA career statistics ==
Legend
GP	Games played	FG%	Field-goal percentage
FT%	Free-throw percentage	APG	Assists per game
PPG	Points per game	**Bold**	Career high

=== Regular season ===
Year	Team	GP	FG%	FT%	APG	PPG
1948–49	Indianapolis	**56**	.321	.652	**1.4**	**4.8**
1949–50	Washington	22	**.323**	.667	0.3	2.8
1949–50	Baltimore	3	.100	**1.000**	0.3	1.3
Career		81	.316	.660	1.1	4.1
