= Zuni (rocket) =

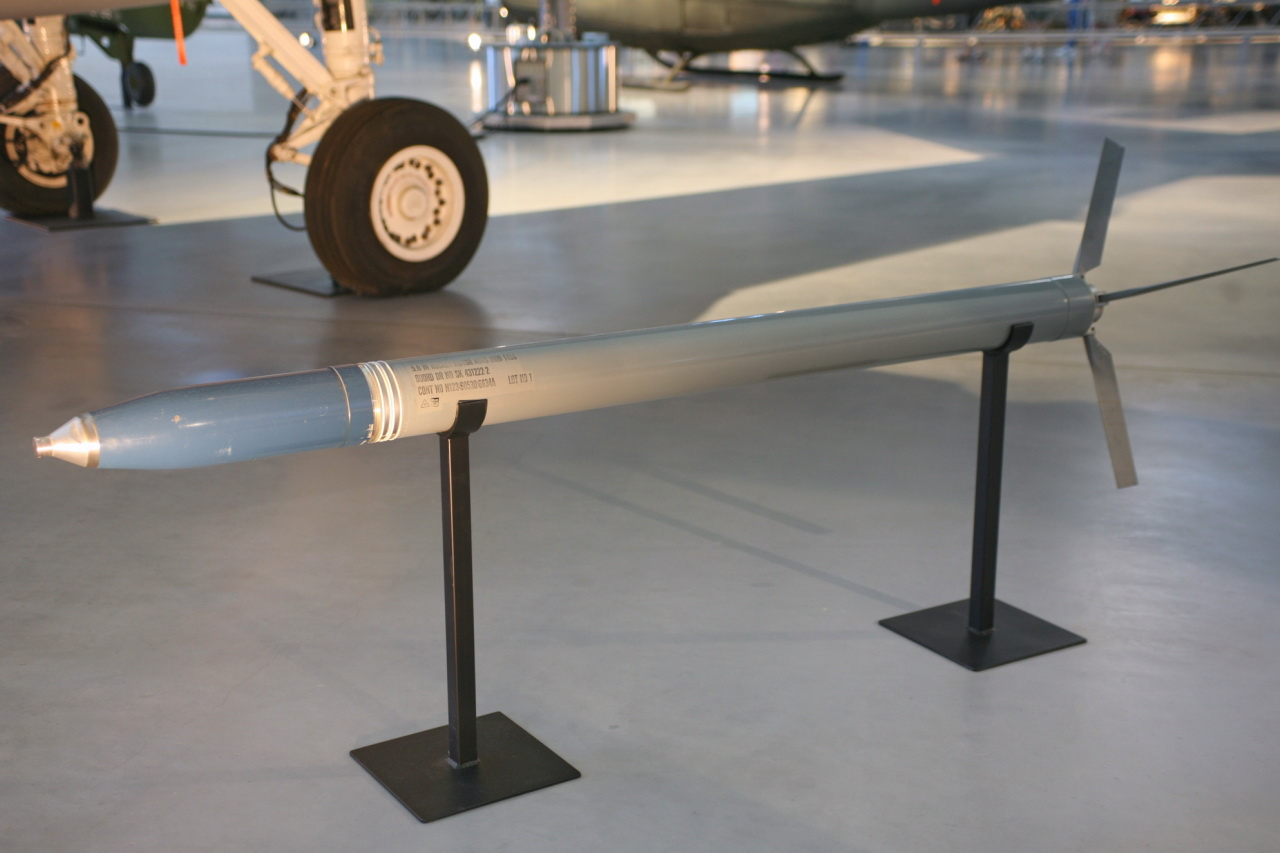
- Type: Air-to-surface rocket
- Place of origin: United States

Service history
- Used by: United States military French Air Force; Ukrainian Air Force

Production history
- Produced: 1957–present

Specifications
- Mass: 79.5 pounds (36.1 kg) (motor only)
- Length: 77 inches (2,000 mm)
- Diameter: 5 inches (127 mm)
- Warhead: various
- Engine: Solid-fuel rocket
- Operational range: 5 miles (8.0 km)
- Maximum speed: 1,615 miles per hour (2,599 km/h)
- Guidance system: None

The Zuni 5-inch Folding-Fin Aircraft Rocket (FFAR), or simply Zuni, is a 5.0 in (127 mm) unguided rocket developed by the Hunter Douglas Division of Bridgeport Brass Company and deployed by the United States Armed Forces, and the French Air Force. The rocket was developed for both air-to-air and air-to-ground operations. It can be used to carry various types of warheads, including chaff for countermeasures. It is usually fired from the LAU-10 rocket pod, holding four rockets.

== Development ==
In the early 1950s, U.S. Navy engineers at Naval Ordnance Test Station China Lake began to develop a new 12.7 cm unguided rocket to replace the High Velocity Aircraft Rocket.

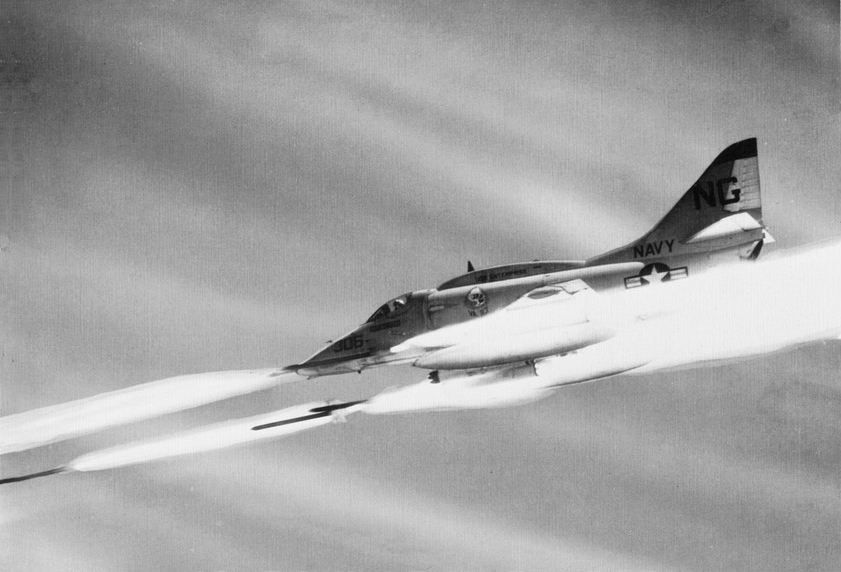
A VA-113 A-4F launching Zunis during the Battle of Khe Sanh, 1968.

The Zuni was designed as a modular system, to allow the use of different types of warheads and fuzes. One type of warhead had a proximity fuze, as the rocket was originally intended to be used as an air-to-air rocket. This led to its selection as the basis for the AIM-9 Sidewinder airframe in the early 1950s.

The Zuni was approved for production in 1957. A number of different launchers were tested for the Zuni, e.g. the twin-tube launchers fitted to the Sidewinder launching rails of the Vought F-8 Crusader. However, four-tube LAU-10/A series pods became the most commonly used launcher.

The Zuni was named after the Zuni Native American tribe in modern day New Mexico.

== Operational history ==
The 5 inch Zuni rockets were first used in combat by F-86F Sabres belonging to the Pakistan Air Force during the Indo-Pakistani War of 1965.

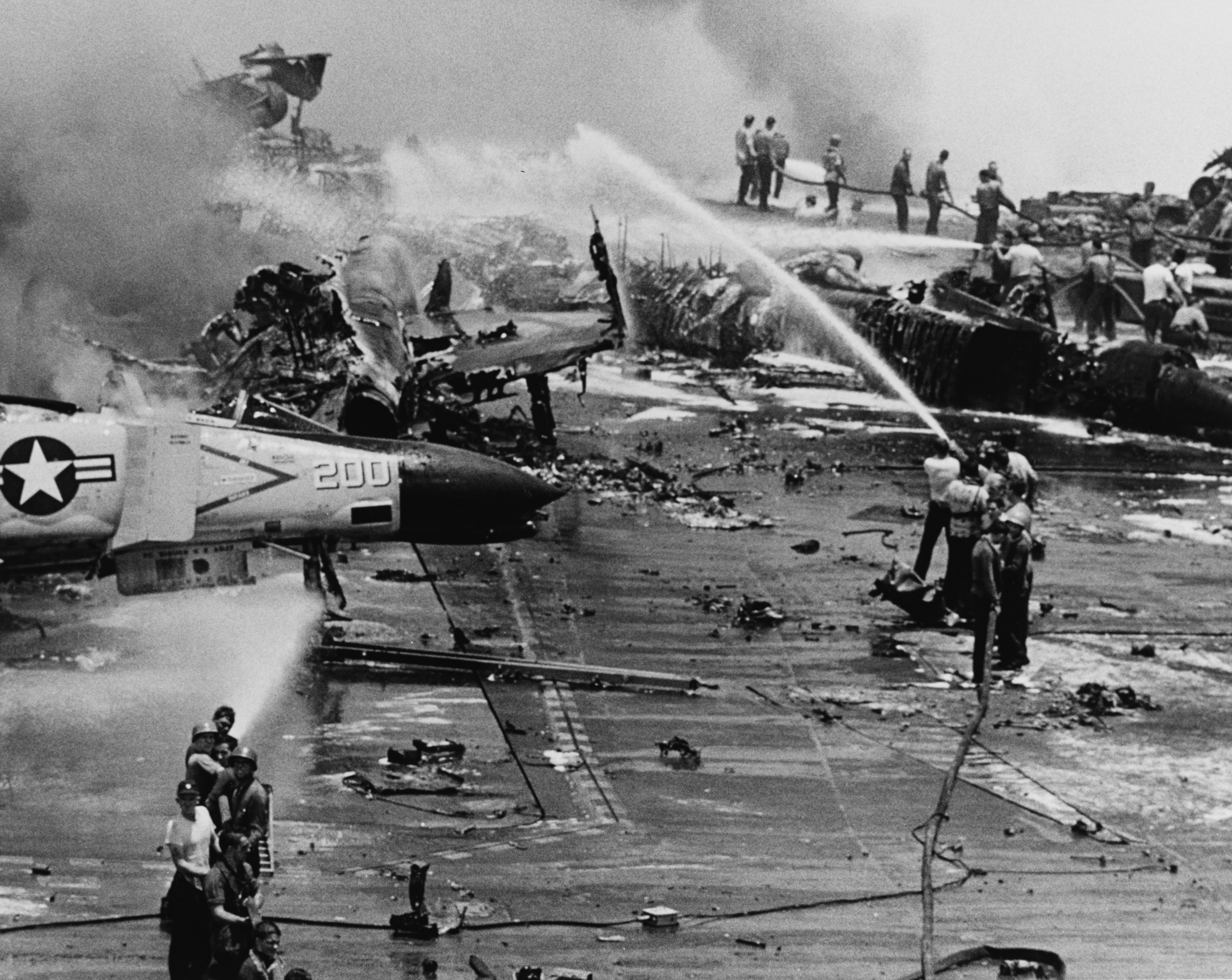
Sailors aboard Forrestal battle a massive ordnance fire triggered by a Zuni rocket

The Zuni was widely used in the ground-attack role during the Vietnam War.

On May 1, 1967, during a sortie against Kép Air Base, North Vietnam, Lieutenant Commander Theodore R. Swartz of Squadron VA-76, flying from USS Bon Homme Richard, shot down a MiG-17 with Zuni rockets. This was the only MiG aircraft to be downed by a Douglas A-4 Skyhawk during the Vietnam War. Lieutenant Commander Swartz received the Silver Star for his action.

Later that year, improper handling of a Mk 32 Zuni rocket and other munitions was responsible for a serious fire aboard USS Forrestal aircraft carrier, which killed 134 men. Two years later, in early 1969, a similar incident on the USS Enterprise aircraft carrier resulted in 27 dead, 314 injured and the loss of fifteen aircraft.

In January 2023, the United States announced that it would be supplying 4,000 Zuni rockets to the Armed Forces of Ukraine for use in the Russo-Ukrainian War. The US transferred its last supplies of Zuni rockets to Ukraine. In June 2024, it was reported that Ukraine had expended its supply of Zuni rockets, possibly indicating the extinction of the weapon system.

== Rocket motors and warheads ==
The Zuni family consists of several different rocket motors and warheads:

Rocket motors
Designation	Weight	Thrust	Length
Mk.16	56.5 lbs (25.6 kg)	7500 lbs (33.3KN) for 1.04s	77 in (2m)
Mk.71 Mod.0	66.85 lbs (30.3 kg)	7780 lbs (34.6KN) for 1.17s	76.3 in (1.9m)
Mk.71 Mod.1	79.5 lbs (36 kg)	8100 lbs (36KN) for 1.8s	82.3 in (2.1m)

Warheads
Warhead designation	Type	Weight	Filler	Additional information
Mk.24	HE	48 lbs (21.7 kg)	9.5 lbs (4.3 kg) Comp.B	The head produces over 500 fragments that penetrate up to 3/8" (9.5mm) mild steel at 30 ft (9.1m) distance upon detonation. When using the Mk.191 base detonating fuze this warhead can penetrate: 2" (50.8mm) Class B armor, 3 ft (914mm) reinforced concrete; 30 ft (9.1m) soft earth.
Mk.32	ATAP (Anti-Tank Anti Personnel)/ HEAT-FRAG	45.7 lbs (20,72 kg)	15 lbs (6.8 kg) Comp.B	The head produces over 2000 1/4" (6.35mm) square fragments that are capable of damaging light vehicles in a radius of 70 ft (21.3m) When issued with a point detonating fuze the HEAT warhead penetrates: 18" (457mm) at 0° angle; 7" (178mm) at 65° angle
Mk.33	Illumination	46 lbs (20.8 kg)	7 lbs (3.17 kg) pyrotechnic material	Flare burns 70 seconds at 1,750,000 cp
Mk.34	Smoke	51 lbs (23 kg)	19.3 lbs (8.7 kg) WP	
Mk.63	HE-Frag	56.5 lbs (25.6 kg)	15 lbs (6.8 kg) Comp.B	
Mk.84	Chaff	47 lbs (21.3 kg)	12 chaff cassetts	
Practice	Practice	same as simulated warhead Mod.	inert	

== Student use ==
The Australian Government donated its Zuni rockets to the Australian Space Research Institute (ASRI). They are used for student experiments, launched from the Woomera launching range.

ASRI has designed and constructed custom nosecones and payload recovery mechanisms for the Zuni. With a payload of 20 kg, the Zuni has an approximate range of 5.9 km, which it attains in about 40 seconds, experiencing 55 G and 491 m/s (Mach 1.4) during the flight.

== Laser Guided Zuni Rocket ==
The 5-inch (127 mm) Laser Guided Zuni Rocket is a precision weapon and an upgrade to the unguided Zuni rocket. The North American division of MBDA is the only manufacturer of the Laser Guided Zuni Rocket, which is similar to the Advanced Precision Kill Weapon System upgrade to the Hydra 70 system.

The Laser Guided Zuni Rocket is composed of the new WGU-58/B Guidance and Control Section that is attached to the front end of an unguided Zuni rocket and warhead. The weapon requires semi-active laser energy to guide to a precise target. The Laser Guided Zuni Rocket is on the U.S. Marine Corps Aviation Weapons Roadmap and Plan and is compatible with any aircraft that is cleared to carry unguided Zunis in a four-place LAU-10 Launcher, including AV-8B Harriers, F/A-18 Hornets, AH-1 Cobra helicopters and P-3 Orion aircraft.

The precision weapon fits in the same launcher as unguided Zunis and requires only a 28V firing pulse and a semi-active laser designator. The weapon was developed under a Cooperative Research and Development Agreement with the Weapons Division of the U.S. Navy's Air Warfare Center in China Lake, California.

In 2009, the Laser Guided Zuni Rocket was successfully tested against both a stationary and moving targets. In September 2010, the weapon successfully underwent a live fire warhead test flight.
