= List of United States Supreme Court cases, volume 104 =

Supreme Court of the United States
- Interactive map of Supreme Court of the United States
- 38°53′26″N 77°00′16″W
- Established: March 4, 1789; 236 years ago
- Location: Washington, D.C.
- Coordinates: 38°53′26″N 77°00′16″W
- Composition method: Presidential nomination with Senate confirmation
- Authorised by: Constitution of the United States, Art. III, § 1
- Judge term length: life tenure, subject to impeachment and removal
- Number of positions: 9 (by statute)
- Website: supremecourt.gov

This is a list of cases reported in volume 104 of United States Reports, decided by the Supreme Court of the United States in 1881 and 1882.

== Justices of the Supreme Court at the time of volume 104 U.S. ==
The Supreme Court is established by Article III, Section 1 of the Constitution of the United States, which says: "The judicial Power of the United States, shall be vested in one supreme Court . . .". The size of the Court is not specified; the Constitution leaves it to Congress to set the number of justices. Under the Judiciary Act of 1789 Congress originally fixed the number of justices at six (one chief justice and five associate justices). Since 1789 Congress has varied the size of the Court from six to seven, nine, ten, and back to nine justices (always including one chief justice).

When the cases in volume 104 U.S. were decided the Court comprised nine of the following eleven members at one time (Nathan Clifford died in July 1881 and was replaced by Horace Gray in January 1882; Ward Hunt retired in January 1882 and was replaced by Samuel Blatchford in April 1882):

Portrait	Justice	Office	Home State	Succeeded	Date confirmed by the Senate (Vote)	Tenure on Supreme Court
	Morrison Waite	Chief Justice	Ohio	Salmon P. Chase	January 21, 1874 (63–0)	March 4, 1874 – March 23, 1888 (Died)
	Nathan Clifford	Associate Justice	Maine	Benjamin Robbins Curtis	January 12, 1858 (26–23)	January 21, 1858 – July 25, 1881 (Died)
	Samuel Freeman Miller	Associate Justice	Iowa	Peter Vivian Daniel	July 16, 1862 (Acclamation)	July 21, 1862 – October 13, 1890 (Died)
	Stephen Johnson Field	Associate Justice	California	newly created seat	March 10, 1863 (Acclamation)	May 10, 1863 – December 1, 1897 (Retired)
	Joseph P. Bradley	Associate Justice	New Jersey	newly created seat	March 21, 1870 (46–9)	March 23, 1870 – January 22, 1892 (Died)
	Ward Hunt	Associate Justice	New York	Samuel Nelson	December 11, 1872 (Acclamation)	January 9, 1873 – January 27, 1882 (Retired)
	John Marshall Harlan	Associate Justice	Kentucky	David Davis	November 29, 1877 (Acclamation)	December 10, 1877 – October 14, 1911 (Died)
	William Burnham Woods	Associate Justice	Georgia	William Strong	December 21, 1880 (39–8)	January 5, 1881 – May 14, 1887 (Died)
	Stanley Matthews	Associate Justice	Ohio	Noah Haynes Swayne	May 12, 1881 (24–23)	May 17, 1881 – March 22, 1889 (Died)
	Horace Gray	Associate Justice	Massachusetts	Nathan Clifford	December 20, 1881 (51–5)	January 9, 1882 – September 15, 1902 (Died)
	Samuel Blatchford	Associate Justice	New York	Ward Hunt	March 22, 1882 (Acclamation)	April 3, 1882 – July 7, 1893 (Died)

== Citation style ==
Under the Judiciary Act of 1789 the federal court structure at the time comprised District Courts, which had general trial jurisdiction; Circuit Courts, which had mixed trial and appellate (from the US District Courts) jurisdiction; and the United States Supreme Court, which had appellate jurisdiction over the federal District and Circuit courts—and for certain issues over state courts. The Supreme Court also had limited original jurisdiction (i.e., in which cases could be filed directly with the Supreme Court without first having been heard by a lower federal or state court). There were one or more federal District Courts and/or Circuit Courts in each state, territory, or other geographical region.

Bluebook citation style is used for case names, citations, and jurisdictions.

- "C.C.D." = United States Circuit Court for the District of . . .
  - e.g.,"C.C.D.N.J." = United States Circuit Court for the District of New Jersey
- "D." = United States District Court for the District of . . .
  - e.g.,"D. Mass." = United States District Court for the District of Massachusetts
- "E." = Eastern; "M." = Middle; "N." = Northern; "S." = Southern; "W." = Western
  - e.g.,"C.C.S.D.N.Y." = United States Circuit Court for the Southern District of New York
  - e.g.,"M.D. Ala." = United States District Court for the Middle District of Alabama
- "Ct. Cl." = United States Court of Claims
- The abbreviation of a state's name alone indicates the highest appellate court in that state's judiciary at the time.
  - e.g.,"Pa." = Supreme Court of Pennsylvania
  - e.g.,"Me." = Supreme Judicial Court of Maine

== List of cases in volume 104 U.S. ==
Case Name	Page and year	Opinion of the Court	Concurring opinion(s)	Dissenting opinion(s)	Lower Court	Disposition
New Haven and Northampton Company v. Hamersley	1 (1881)	Waite	none	none	Conn.	affirmed
Baltimore and Ohio Railroad Company v. Koontz	5 (1881)	Waite	none	none	Va.	reversed
Shanks v. Klein	18 (1881)	Miller	none	none	C.C.S.D. Miss.	affirmed
Smith v. McCullough	25 (1881)	Harlan	none	none	C.C.W.D. Mo.	affirmed
Martin v. Cole	30 (1881)	Matthews	none	none	Colo.	affirmed
United States v. Jackson	41 (1881)	Miller	none	none	C.C.E.D. Va.	affirmed
King v. Worthington	44 (1881)	Woods	none	none	C.C.N.D. Ill.	affirmed
Driesbach v. Second National Bank	52 (1881)	Waite	none	none	C.C.W.D. Pa.	affirmed
Central National Bank v. Connecticut Mutual Life Insurance Company of Hartford	54 (1881)	Matthews	none	none	C.C.D. Md.	affirmed
Kelly v. City of Pittsburgh	78 (1881)	Miller	none	none	Pa.	affirmed
Davis v. Speiden	83 (1881)	Waite	none	none	Sup. Ct. D.C.	reversed
Klein v. New York Life Insurance Company	88 (1881)	Woods	none	none	C.C.N.D. Ill.	affirmed
Metcalf v. Williams	93 (1881)	Bradley	none	none	C.C.E.D. Va.	affirmed
Dudley v. Easton	99 (1881)	Waite	none	none	C.C.E.D. Mo.	affirmed
Koon v. Phoenix Mutual Life Insurance Company	106 (1881)	Waite	none	none	C.C.N.D. Ill.	affirmed
Jones v. Randolph	108 (1881)	Waite	none	none	Sup. Ct. D.C.	reversed
Nevada Bank v. Sedgwick	111 (1881)	Waite	none	none	C.C.D. Cal.	affirmed
Lehigh Valley Railroad Company v. Mellon	112 (1881)	Woods	none	none	C.C.E.D. Pa.	reversed
City of Chicago v. Tebbetts	120 (1881)	Bradley	none	none	C.C.N.D. Ill.	affirmed
Barton v. Barbour	126 (1881)	Woods	none	Miller	Sup. Ct. D.C.	affirmed
Fort v. Roush	142 (1881)	Waite	none	none	Sup. Ct. Terr. Mont.	reversed
St. Louis Insurance Company v. St. Louis, Vandalia, Terre Haute, and Indianapolis Railroad Company	146 (1881)	Harlan	none	none	C.C.E.D. Mo.	affirmed
Davis v. Wells, Fargo and Company	159 (1881)	Matthews	none	none	Sup. Ct. Terr. Utah	affirmed
Porter v. Graves	171 (1881)	Miller	none	none	C.C.N.D.N.Y.	affirmed
Flagstaff Silver Mining Company of Utah v. Cullins	176 (1881)	Woods	none	none	Sup. Ct. Terr. Utah	affirmed
The Woodland	180 (1881)	Waite	none	none	C.C.S.D.N.Y.	affirmed
The Steamship Osborne	183 (1881)	Waite	none	none	C.C.N.D. Ohio	certiorari denied
The Annie Lindsley	185 (1881)	Woods	none	none	C.C.S.D.N.Y.	affirmed
Mahoney Mining Company v. Anglo-Californian Bank	192 (1881)	Harlan	none	none	C.C.D. Cal.	affirmed
Knickerbocker Life Insurance Company v. Trefz	197 (1881)	Matthews	none	none	C.C.D.N.J.	affirmed
Williams v. Nottawa Township	209 (1881)	Waite	none	none	C.C.W.D. Mich.	reversed
Morrison v. Stalnaker	213 (1881)	Miller	none	none	Neb.	affirmed
United States v. Taylor	216 (1881)	Woods	none	none	Ct. Cl.	affirmed
Loring v. Frue	223 (1881)	Miller	none	none	C.C.E.D. Mich.	reversed
Conner v. Long	228 (1881)	Matthews	none	none	C.C.S.D.N.Y.	reversed
Walker v. Powers	245 (1881)	Miller	none	none	C.C.N.D.N.Y.	affirmed
Thompson v. Knickerbocker Life Insurance Company	252 (1881)	Bradley	none	none	C.C.S.D. Ala.	affirmed
Hale v. Finch	261 (1881)	Harlan	none	none	Sup. Ct. Terr. Wash.	affirmed
National Bank v. Johnson	271 (1881)	Matthews	none	none	N.Y. Sup. Ct.	affirmed
Belk v. Meagher	279 (1881)	Waite	none	none	Sup. Ct. Terr. Mont.	affirmed
Giles v. Little	291 (1881)	Woods	none	none	C.C.D. Neb.	reversed
Ex parte Woollen	300 (1881)	Waite	none	none	C.C.D. Ind.	mandamus denied
Libby v. Hopkins	303 (1881)	Woods	none	none	Ohio	affirmed
Pickering v. McCullough	310 (1881)	Matthews	none	none	C.C.W.D. Pa.	affirmed
Sage v. Wyncoop	319 (1881)	Waite	none	none	C.C.N.D.N.Y.	affirmed
Collins v. Riley	322 (1881)	Harlan	none	none	D.W. Va.	affirmed
Wood v. Burlington and Missouri River Railroad Company	329 (1881)	Field	none	none	C.C.D. Neb.	affirmed
Egbert v. Lippmann	333 (1881)	Woods	none	Miller	C.C.S.D.N.Y.	affirmed
Worley v. Tobacco Company	340 (1882)	Woods	none	none	C.C.E.D. Mo.	affirmed
Gautier v. Arthur	345 (1881)	Field	none	none	C.C.S.D.N.Y.	reversed
Draper v. Davis	347 (1882)	Bradley	none	none	Sup. Ct. D.C.	affirmed
E. Miller and Company v. Bridgeport Brass Company	350 (1882)	Bradley	none	none	C.C.D. Conn.	affirmed
James v. Campbell	356 (1882)	Bradley	none	Miller	C.C.S.D.N.Y.	reversed
Davis v. Gaines	386 (1881)	Woods	none	none	C.C.D. La.	reversed
Hyde v. Ruble	407 (1882)	Waite	none	none	C.C.D. Minn.	affirmed
Bronson v. Schulten	410 (1882)	Miller	none	none	C.C.S.D.N.Y.	reversed
Cummings v. Jones	419 (1882)	Waite	none	none	Ill.	dismissed
Quinby v. Conlan	420 (1882)	Field	none	none	Cal.	affirmed
Boughton v. American Exchange National Bank	427 (1881)	Waite	none	none	Pa.	dismissed
Neslin v. Wells Fargo and Company	428 (1882)	Matthews	none	none	Sup. Ct. Terr. Utah	affirmed
Vigel v. Hopp	441 (1881)	Waite	none	none	Sup. Ct. D.C.	reversed
Bradley v. United States	442 (1882)	Waite	none	none	Ct. Cl.	affirmed
Wells v. Nickles	444 (1882)	Miller	none	none	Sup. Ct. Terr. Utah	reversed
Hawes v. City of Oakland	450 (1882)	Miller	none	none	C.C.D. Cal.	affirmed
Rosenblatt v. Johnston	462 (1882)	Waite	none	none	C.C.E.D. Mo.	affirmed
Murphy v. United States	464 (1882)	Waite	none	none	Ct. Cl.	affirmed
Lamar v. Micou	465 (1881)	Waite	none	none	C.C.S.D.N.Y.	dismissed
People ex rel. Hanemann v. City of New York	466 (1881)	Harlan	none	none	N.Y. Sup. Ct.	affirmed
Village of Louisville v. Portsmouth Savings Bank	469 (1881)	Harlan	none	none	C.C.S.D. Ill.	affirmed
United States v. Pacific Mail Steamship Company Company	480 (1882)	Miller	none	none	Ct. Cl.	affirmed
Huntington v. Palmer	482 (1882)	Miller	none	none	C.C.D. Cal.	affirmed
Vinton v. Hamilton	485 (1882)	Woods	none	none	C.C.N.D. Ohio	affirmed
Bank of Commerce v. Tennessee	493 (1882)	Field	none	none	Tenn.	affirmed
Vietor v. Arthur	498 (1881)	Waite	none	none	C.C.S.D.N.Y.	reversed
Draper v. Town of Springport	501 (1882)	Bradley	none	none	C.C.N.D.N.Y.	reversed
Stewart v. Town of Lansing	505 (1882)	Waite	none	none	C.C.N.D.N.Y.	affirmed
Strong v. Willey	512 (1881)	Waite	none	none	Sup. Ct. D.C.	affirmed
Ex parte Gordon	515 (1882)	Waite	none	none	D. Md.	prohibition denied
Ex parte Detroit River Ferry Company	519 (1882)	Waite	none	none	E.D. Mich.	prohibition denied
Ex parte Hagar	520 (1882)	Waite	none	none	D. Del.	prohibition denied
Gottfried v. Miller	521 (1882)	Woods	none	none	C.C.E.D. Wis.	affirmed
Micou v. First National Bank	530 (1882)	Matthews	none	none	C.C.M.D. Ala.	reversed
Stow v. City of Chicago	547 (1882)	Woods	none	none	C.C.N.D. Ill.	affirmed
Griggs v. Houston	553 (1882)	Waite	none	none	C.C.E.D. Tenn.	affirmed
Jones v. Buckell	554 (1882)	Waite	none	none	C.C.N.D. Fla.	affirmed
Micas v. Williams	556 (1882)	Waite	none	none	C.C.E.D. La.	affirmed
Merrell v. Tice	557 (1882)	Bradley	none	none	C.C.E.D. Mo.	reversed
Elwood v. Flannigan	562 (1882)	Waite	none	none	C.C.N.D. Ill.	affirmed
Davis v. Friedlander, Stich and Company	570 (1882)	Harlan	none	none	C.C.W.D. Tenn.	reversed
Ex parte Cockcroft	578 (1882)	Waite	none	none	C.C.D.S.C.	mandamus denied
Clay County v. Society for Savings	579 (1882)	Woods	none	none	C.C.S.D. Ill.	affirmed
Bonaparte v. Tax Court	592 (1882)	Waite	none	none	Md.	affirmed
Dugger v. Bocock	596 (1882)	Waite	none	none	Ala.	dismissed
Ex parte Rowland	604 (1882)	Waite	none	none	C.C.M.D. Ala.	habeas corpus granted
Davis v. Fredericks	618 (1882)	Waite	none	none	Sup. Ct. Terr. Mont.	affirmed
United States v. McBratney	621 (1882)	Gray	none	none	Sup. Ct. D.C.	certification
Moores v. Citizens' National Bank	625 (1882)	Gray	none	none	C.C.S.D. Ohio	reversed
Hopt v. Utah	631 (1882)	Gray	none	none	Sup. Ct. Terr. Utah	reversed
St. Louis Smelting and Refining Company v. Kemp	636 (1882)	Field	none	none	C.C.D. Colo.	reversed
St. Louis Smelting and Refining Company v. Ray	657 (1882)	Field	none	none	C.C.D. Colo.	reversed
City of St. Louis v. Knapp, Stout and Company	658 (1882)	Harlan	none	none	C.C.E.D. Mo.	reversed
Union Pacific Railroad Company v. United States	662 (1882)	Matthews	none	none	Ct. Cl.	reversed
Town of Koshkonong v. Burton	668 (1882)	Harlan	none	none	C.C.W.D. Wis.	reversed
Chicago and North Western Transportation Company v. United States	680 (1882)	Matthews	none	none	Ct. Cl.	reversed
Chicago, Milwaukee and St. Paul Railway Company v. United States	687 (1882)	Matthews	none	none	Ct. Cl.	reversed
Mason v. Sargent	689 (1882)	Matthews	none	none	C.C.D. Mass.	reversed
Merritt v. S. and W. Welsh	694 (1882)	Bradley	none	Matthews	C.C.S.D.N.Y.	affirmed
Savings Bank v. Archbold	708 (1882)	Field	none	none	C.C.S.D.N.Y.	reversed
American Printing House for the Blind (Kentucky) v. American Printing House for the Blind (Louisiana)	711 (1882)	Bradley	none	none	C.C.D. La.	affirmed
United States v. Real Estate Savings Bank of Pittsburg	728 (1882)	Waite	none	none	Ct. Cl.	affirmed
Pott v. Arthur	735 (1882)	Bradley	none	none	C.C.S.D.N.Y.	affirmed
Heald v. Rice	737 (1882)	Matthews	none	none	C.C.D. Cal.	reversed
Britton v. Niccolls	757 (1882)	Field	none	none	C.C.S.D. Miss.	reversed
United States v. Babbitt	767 (1882)	Waite	none	none	Ct. Cl.	affirmed
Blair v. Gray	769 (1882)	Waite	none	none	C.C.N.D. Ill.	affirmed
Poppe v. Langford	770 (1882)	Waite	none	none	Cal.	dismissed
Loudon v. City of Memphis	771 (1882)	Waite	none	none	C.C.W.D. Tenn.	affirmed
Warnock v. Davis	775 (1882)	Field	none	none	C.C.S.D. Ohio	reversed
Fox v. City of Cincinnati	783 (1882)	Waite	none	none	Ohio	affirmed
Wood v. Weimar	786 (1881)	Waite	none	none	C.C.W.D. Mich.	reversed
