= Salem Trailblazers =

Basketball team

The Salem Trailblazers were an American professional basketball team located in Salem, Oregon who played in the Pacific Coast Professional Basketball League (PCPBL) during the 1946–47 season. The Trailblazers used the Salem Armory as their home court.

On December 22, 1946, the Bellingham Fircrests sold guard Don Stitt to Salem. In January 1947, the Trailblazers only played one game in Salem and by February they abandoned the city as their home and became a traveling team. Low attendance was cited as the reason for the change. Len Yandle was the head coach of the team until he was replaced by Frank Shone, who eventually resigned the position. The team finished their home games in Mt. Angel, Oregon at the Mount Angel Abbey. The Trailblazers were owned by Dan Hay who struggled throughout the season to pay investors and outstanding bills. After the season, he merged his team with the Spokane team, becoming the Spokane Blazers. The team folded three weeks after the merger.

== Roster ==
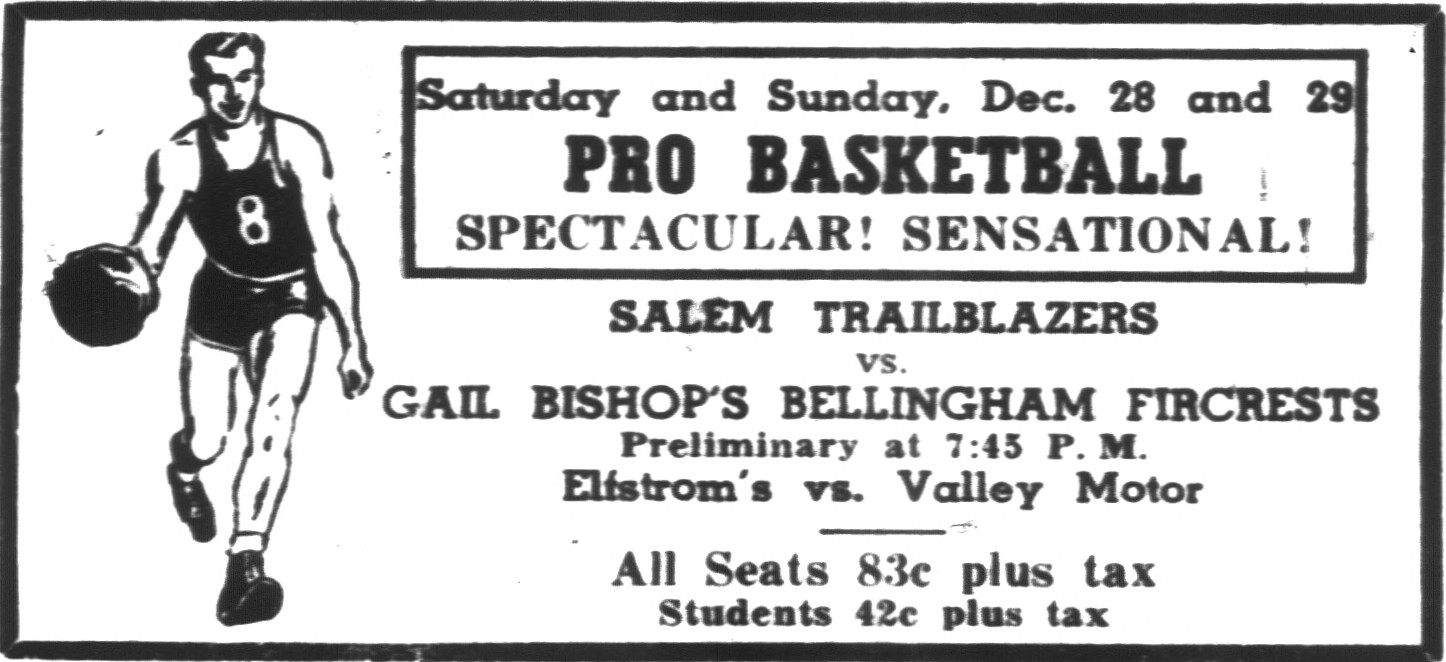
An advertisement for two Trailblazers games from the December 24, 1946 edition of The Oregon Statesman.

- Ernie Maskovitch
- O'Brink, guard
- Stretch Osterhaus, center
- Don Stitt, guard
- Len Yandle player-coach from the University of Oregon
- John Kolb, guard
- Johnson
- Stroyan
- Gray
- Teyama
- Anton
- Vaughn
