= Roger Jorgensen =

American basketball player

Personal information
- Born: September 2, 1920 Columbus, Ohio, U.S.
- Died: October 3, 2010 (aged 90) Pittsburgh, Pennsylvania, U.S.
- Listed height: 6 ft 5 in (1.96 m)
- Listed weight: 200 lb (91 kg)

Career information
- High school: Taylor Allderdice (Pittsburgh, Pennsylvania)
- College: Ohio State (1939–1941)
- Playing career: 1944–1948
- Position: Center / forward
- Number: 7

Career history

Playing
- 1944–1945: Washington Capitols
- 1946–1947: East Pittsburgh Pirates
- 1946–1947: Pittsburgh Ironmen
- 1947–1948: Zanesville Pioneers

Coaching
- 1947–1949: Waynesburg College (assistant)
- 1950–1951: Waynesburg College
- Stats at NBA.com
- Stats at Basketball Reference

Roger Kennedy Jorgensen (September 2, 1920 – October 3, 2010) was an American basketball player. He played high school basketball at Taylor Allderdice High School in Pittsburgh, Pennsylvania where in 1938 he set the city high school record for most points in a season with 220 points, which stood until 1945.

Jorgensen played college basketball for the Pittsburgh Panthers and Ohio State Buckeyes. His college career was interrupted by World War II, with Jorgensen serving nearly four years in the United States Navy.

Following his stint in the Navy, Jorgensen initially signed with the East Pittsburgh Pirates in December 1946. Later that month, he joined the Pittsburgh Ironmen of the Basketball Association of America. The following season, he played for the Zanesville Pioneers.

== Coaching career ==
Jorgensen was an assistant coach to Frankie Gustine at Waynesburg College from 1947 to 1949. In 1950, he was hired as the head coach of Waynesburg men's team.

== Personal life ==
Jorgensen was the brother of former NBA player Noble Jorgensen and Byron Jorgensen who played college basketball for Ohio. His father was Charles Jorgensen, trainer of the Pittsburgh Pirates

== BAA career statistics ==
Legend
GP	Games played
FG%	Field-goal percentage
FT%	Free-throw percentage
APG	Assists per game
PPG	Points per game

=== Regular season ===
Year	Team	GP	FG%	FT%	APG	PPG
1946–47	Pittsburgh	28	.259	.684	.0	1.5
Career		28	.259	.684	.0	1.5
