= Red Mihalik =

American basketball player and referee

Personal information
- Born: September 22, 1916 Ford City, Pennsylvania, U.S.
- Died: October 25, 1996 (aged 80) Ford City, Pennsylvania, U.S.
- Listed height: 6 ft 0 in (1.83 m)
- Listed weight: 180 lb (82 kg)

Career information
- High school: Ford City (Ford City, Pennsylvania)
- Position: Guard
- Number: 6

Career history
- 1946: Pittsburgh Ironmen
- 1946–1947: Youngstown Bears
- Stats at NBA.com
- Stats at Basketball Reference
- Basketball Hall of Fame

Zigmund John "Red" Mihalik (September 22, 1916 – September 25, 1996) was an American basketball player and referee of Polish descent. Inducted into the Naismith Memorial Basketball Hall of Fame in 1986, he was then inducted into the National Polish-American Sports Hall of Fame at St. Mary's College in Orchard Lake, Michigan on June 13, 1996.

Born thirty miles north of Pittsburgh in Ford City, Pennsylvania as Zigmund Mihalik on September 22, 1916, Mihalik played basketball as a youth and subsequently took up refereeing when officials for a high school game failed to show up.

During the 1940s, the 6'1" Mihalik played professionally for the Pittsburgh Ironmen of the Basketball Association of America and the Youngstown Bears of the National Basketball League.

He then embarked upon a long officiating career, working games for the NBA, NCAA, and Summer Olympics in Tokyo in 1964 and in Mexico City in 1968, and was deemed the best official of the game on all levels in the 1950s by Dell Publications until an on-court knee injury forced him into retirement in 1972.

Mihalik was inducted into the National Polish-American Sports Hall of Fame in 1996.

Mihalik died from cancer at the age of eighty on September 25, 1996, in Ford City.

== BAA career statistics ==
Legend
GP	Games played
FG%	Field-goal percentage
FT%	Free-throw percentage
APG	Assists per game
PPG	Points per game

=== Regular season ===
Year	Team	GP	FG%	FT%	APG	PPG
1946–47	Pittsburgh	7	.333	.000	.0	.9
Career		7	.333	.000	.0	.9
