= Nat Frankel =

American basketball player (1913–2006)

Personal information
- Born: November 3, 1913 Brooklyn, New York, U.S.
- Died: March 14, 2006 (aged 92) Queens, New York, U.S.
- Listed height: 6 ft 0 in (1.83 m)
- Listed weight: 195 lb (88 kg)

Career information
- High school: Samuel J. Tilden (Brooklyn, New York)
- College: Brooklyn
- Playing career: 1934–1947
- Position: Forward / guard
- Number: 15

Career history
- 1934–1934: Bronx Americans
- 1934–1935: New Britain Jackaways / Newark Mules
- 1935–1936: New York Jewels
- 1936–1938: Patterson / Brooklyn Visitations
- 1938: New York Celtics
- 1938–1939: Kingston Colonials
- 1939–1940: Detroit Eagles
- 1940–1942: Washington Brewers
- 1943–1944: New York Americans
- 1944–1945: Washington Capitols
- 1946: Pittsburgh Ironmen
- 1946–1947: Troy Celtics

Career highlights
- All-NBL Second Team (1940)
- Stats at NBA.com
- Stats at Basketball Reference

Nathan Frankel (November 3, 1913 – March 14, 2006) was an American professional basketball player. He spent one season in the Basketball Association of America (BAA) as a member of the Pittsburgh Ironmen during the 1946–47 season, but he spent the majority of his playing career as a member of teams in the American Basketball League (ABL). He attended Brooklyn College.

== BAA career statistics ==
Legend
GP	Games played
FG%	Field-goal percentage
FT%	Free-throw percentage
APG	Assists per game
PPG	Points per game

=== Regular season ===
Year	Team	GP	FG%	FT%	APG	PPG
1946–47	Pittsburgh	6	.148	.667	.5	2.7
Career		6	.148	.667	.5	2.7
