= Pacific Coast Professional Basketball League =

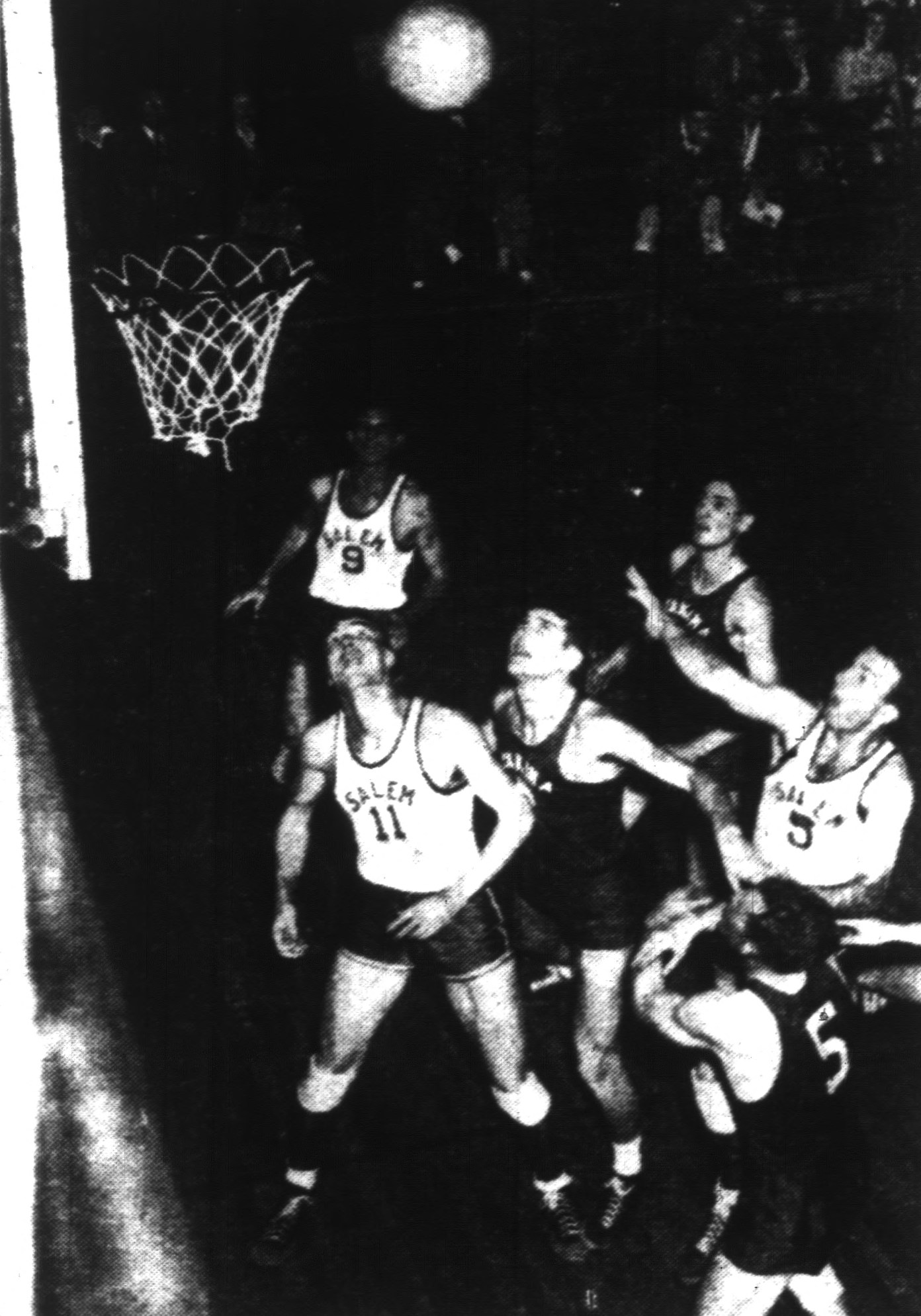
A game between the Salem Trailblazers and the Yakima Ramblers in 1946.

The Pacific Coast Professional Basketball League was a professional basketball league with teams from the Pacific Northwest in the United States and Canada. The league existed for two seasons, 1946-47 and 1947-48.

== Teams ==
Three teams played in both seasons:

- Bellingham Fircrests
- Portland Indians
- Vancouver Hornets

These teams played in the 1946-47 season, but dropped out for the 1947-48 season:

- Salem Trailblazers
- Seattle Blue Devils
- Spokane Orphans
- Yakima Ramblers

These teams joined the league for the 1947-48 season:

- Astoria Royal Chinooks
- Seattle Athletics
- Tacoma Mountaineers

== Champions ==
- 1946-47: Bellingham Fircrests won round robin playoffs; chose not to play in the World Professional Basketball Tournament, so runner-up Portland Indians went instead, losing to the Sheboygan Redskins in the first round.
- 1947-48: Portland Indians defeated Seattle Athletics 3 games to 1. (The fourth game was disallowed after a timekeeping error and replayed two days later with Portland winning 76–74).

== Notable players ==
- George (Porky) Andrews
- Gale Bishop
- Norm Baker
- Al Brightman
- Boody Gilbertson
- Noble Jorgensen
- John Mandic
- Ken Suesens
- Urgel (Slim) Wintermute
