= Astoria Royal Chinooks =

The Astoria Royal Chinooks, known also as the Lower Columbia Royal Chinooks, were a professional basketball team based in Astoria, Oregon who played in the Pacific Coast Professional Basketball League (PCBL) during the 1947–48 season. Wally Palmberg, a graduate of Oregon State University, was their player-coach and part-owner. At the start of February, 1948 the Royal Chinooks called a team meeting to announce that they were folding due to low attendance. All of their roster were declared free agents and most of them signed with other clubs. Their home court was Astoria Armory.

== Roster ==
- Bill Magruder, forward
- Rube Wirkkunen, forward
- Ken Hays, center from the University of Oregon
- Jack Howard, guard
- Jim Vernon, guard
- Ty Lovelace, guard from Eugene High School
- Wally Palmberg, guard and head coach from Oregon State University
- Bob Warren, guard
- Erland "Andy" Anderson, forward from Oregon State University
- Frank Smith
