= Tony Kappen =

American basketball player (1919–1993)

Personal information
- Born: April 13, 1919 Brooklyn, New York, U.S.
- Died: December 18, 1993 (aged 79)
- Listed height: 5 ft 10 in (1.78 m)
- Listed weight: 165 lb (75 kg)

Career information
- High school: Forest Hills (Queens, New York)
- Position: Guard
- Number: 5

Career history
- 1936–1937: Jersey Reds
- 1938–1939: Brooklyn Visitation
- 1939–1940: Baltimore Clippers
- 1940–1942: New York Jewels
- 1945–1946: New York Gothams
- 1946: Boston Celtics
- 1946–1947: Pittsburgh Ironmen
- 1948–1949: Troy Celtics
- Stats at NBA.com
- Stats at Basketball Reference

Anthony George Kappen (April 13, 1919 – December 18, 1993) was an American professional basketball player.

A 5'10" guard who did not attend college and had previously attended Forest Hills High School in Queens, Kappen played for the Boston Celtics and the Pittsburgh Ironmen during the 1946–47 BAA season. He averaged 6.5 points per game during the season on 23.8% shooting. Kappen and Celtics teammate Connie Simmons were the first players in the BAA (later known as the NBA) who did not have any college experience. Kappen had previously played in the American Basketball League for the New York Gothams and Brooklyn Gothams.

Celtics PR director Howie McHugh said that Kappen "was one of the few guys [on the 1946–47 Celtics] who were serious about playing". However, Kappen was traded midseason to the Pittsburgh Ironmen for Moe Becker, who had become available after a falling-out with his coach.

== BAA career statistics ==
Legend
GP	Games played	FG%	Field-goal percentage
FT%	Free-throw percentage	APG	Assists per game
PPG	Points per game	**Bold**	Career high

=== Regular season ===
Year	Team	GP	FG%	FT%	APG	PPG
1946–47	Boston	18	**.275**	.632	.3	4.1
1946–47	Pittsburgh	**41**	.231	**.856**	**.5**	**7.6**
Career		59	.238	.795	.5	6.5
