= Portland Indians =

Basketball team in Oregon, 1946 to 1948

The Portland Indians were a professional basketball team in Portland, Oregon. They were a member of the Pacific Coast Professional Basketball League for the duration of the league, which only lasted two seasons: 1946–47 and 1947–48. They played their home games in the Portland Armory.

== Notable players ==
- Norm Baker (member of Canada's Sports Hall of Fame)
- Don Durdan (Oregon State Beavers basketball and football player, in Oregon Sports Hall of Fame)
- Jackie Goldsmith (notable key figure involved in the CCNY point-shaving scandal)
- Noble Jorgensen (future NBA center)
- John Mandic (Oregon State Beavers, NBA, in Oregon Sports Hall of Fame)
- Urgel (Slim) Wintermute (player/coach) (member of 1939 Oregon Ducks NCAA Men's Division I Basketball Championship team, in Oregon Sports Hall of Fame)
- Swede Roos, (player/coach, teammate of Naismith Hall of Famers George Mikan and Bobby McDermott on the NBL's Chicago American Gears)

== League championships ==
In the 1946–47 season, the Indians posted the best overall record, but finished second in the round-robin playoffs to the Bellingham Fircrests. When the Fircrests declined an invitation to the World Professional Basketball Tournament in Chicago, the Indians went instead, but lost to the Sheboygan Redskins in the first round.

In the 1947–48 season, the Indians entered the round-robin playoffs as a wildcard team, eventually reaching the best-of-five championship series against the Seattle Athletics. Portland won the first two games in Seattle, and Seattle won the third game in Portland. The fourth game was also played in Portland. With Portland leading 81–80 with 20 seconds left, the timekeeper sounded the final buzzer as Seattle's Al Brightman scored an open layup. Whether or not this was done inadvertently is not known, but the basket was disallowed and Portland was initially given the victory. Eventually, both teams agreed to replay the game two days later and Portland won the game 76–74, and with it, the championship.
