= Harry Zeller =

American basketball player

Personal information
- Born: July 10, 1919 New Kensington, Pennsylvania, U.S.
- Died: September 22, 2004 (aged 85)
- Listed height: 6 ft 4 in (1.93 m)
- Listed weight: 210 lb (95 kg)

Career information
- High school: St. George (Allentown, Pennsylvania)
- College: Washington & Jefferson (1940–1943); Pittsburgh (1944–1946)
- Playing career: 1946–1949
- Position: Center / forward
- Number: 18, 14

Career history
- 1946–1947: Pittsburgh Ironmen
- 1947–1948: Altoona Railroders
- 1948–1949: Pittsburgh Corbetts

Career statistics
- Points: 362
- Assists: 31
- Personal foul: 177
- Stats at NBA.com
- Stats at Basketball Reference

Harry Raymond Zeller (July 10, 1919 – September 22, 2004), also known as Hank Zeller, was a doctor and basketball player. He attended St. George High School in Allentown, Pennsylvania. He was a pre-med student Washington & Jefferson College where he also played basketball for two years. He later attended the University of Pittsburgh where he was named captain of the basketball team in 1945.

Zeller served both in World War II and the Korean War.

== BAA career statistics ==
Legend
GP	Games played
FG%	Field-goal percentage
FT%	Free-throw percentage
APG	Assists per game
PPG	Points per game

=== Regular season ===
Year	Team	GP	FG%	FT%	APG	PPG
1946–47	Pittsburgh	48	.314	.689	.6	7.5
Career		48	.314	.689	.6	7.5
