= John Abramovic =

American basketball player (1919–2000)

- Abramovic with the Salem Tigers

Personal information
- Born: February 9, 1919 Etna, Pennsylvania, U.S.
- Died: June 9, 2000 (aged 81) Ormond Beach, Florida, U.S.
- Listed height: 6 ft 3 in (1.91 m)
- Listed weight: 195 lb (88 kg)

Career information
- High school: Etna (Etna, Pennsylvania)
- College: Salem (1939–1943)
- Playing career: 1946–1948
- Position: Forward
- Number: 3, 9, 31

Career history
- 1946–1947: Pittsburgh Ironmen
- 1947: St. Louis Bombers
- 1947: Baltimore Bullets
- 1947–1948: Syracuse Nationals

Career highlights
- Third-team All-American – Pic (1943)
- Stats at NBA.com
- Stats at Basketball Reference

John M. Abramovic Jr. (February 9, 1919 – June 9, 2000) was an American professional basketball player. He played in the Basketball Association of America (BAA) for the Pittsburgh Ironmen, St. Louis Bombers and Baltimore Bullets. Abramovic was nicknamed "Brooms" and worked in his family's broom manufacturing business after his playing retirement.

== Early life and college career ==
Abramovic grew up in Etna, Pennsylvania, and graduated from high school in 1937. He worked in his family's plant manufacturing brooms for two years. Abramovic was offered a scholarship through his high school coach to attend Salem College (now Salem University) in Salem, West Virginia, where he played from 1939 to 1943. Abramovic's 2,170 points made him the first college basketball player to score more than 2,000 points in a career.

Abramovic spent three years in the United States Navy during World War II.

== Professional career ==
Abramovic returned to Pennsylvania in 1946 to play for the Pittsburgh Ironmen of the newly formed Basketball Association of America (BAA). Abramovic averaged 11.2 points per game during his only season with the team before it folded. He played professionally for one more season and then retired from basketball to join the family broom and mop business in Etna. Abramovic officiated prep and college sports for over 25 years.

== Legacy ==
Abramovic was inducted into the West Virginia Sportswriters Hall of Fame in 1971, and the Salem University Athletic Hall of Fame in 1984.

== BAA career statistics ==
Legend
GP	Games played	FG%	Field-goal percentage
FT%	Free-throw percentage	APG	Assists per game
PPG	Points per game	**Bold**	Career high

=== Regular season ===
Year	Team	GP	FG%	FT%	APG	PPG
1946–47	Pittsburgh	**47**	**.242**	**.691**	**.7**	**11.2**
1947–48	St. Louis	4	.100	.500	.3	1.0
1947–48	Baltimore	5	.000	.667	.2	.4
Career		56	.237	.686	.7	9.5
