= Moe Becker =

American basketball player (1917–1996)

Personal information
- Born: February 24, 1917 Pittsburgh, Pennsylvania
- Died: January 9, 1996 (aged 78) Peoria, Arizona
- Listed height: 6 ft 1 in (1.85 m)
- Listed weight: 185 lb (84 kg)

Career information
- High school: Fifth Avenue (Pittsburgh, Pennsylvania)
- College: Duquesne (1938–1941)
- Playing career: 1941–1948
- Position: Guard / forward
- Number: 5, 6, 67

Career history
- 1941–1942: Aberdeen Army Center
- 1942: Wilmington Blue Bombers
- 1943–1944: Philadelphia Sphas
- 1944–1945: Baltimore Bullets
- 1945–1946: Youngstown Bears
- 1946: Pittsburgh Ironmen
- 1946–1947: Boston Celtics
- 1947: Detroit Falcons
- 1947–1948: Atlanta Crackers
- 1948: Pitt-Altoona Railroaders

Career highlights
- First-team All-American – MSG (1941)
- Stats at NBA.com
- Stats at Basketball Reference

Morris Robert Becker (February 24, 1917 – January 9, 1996) was an American professional basketball player. He played college basketball for the Duquesne Dukes.

Barr played professionally for the Pittsburgh Ironmen, Boston Celtics and Detroit Falcons of the Basketball Association of America (BAA) for 43 games during the 1946–47 season. Becker also played for the Wilmington Blue Bombers, Philadelphia Sphas and Baltimore Bullets of the American Basketball League, the Youngstown Bears of the National Basketball League, and the Atlanta Crackers of the Professional Basketball League of America.

== College career ==
Becker formed a trio known as the "Iron Dukes" with Duquesne teammates Ed Milkovich and Paul Widowitz that led the team to a 51–10 record in three seasons.

== Professional career ==
Becker served in the United States Army at the Aberdeen Proving Ground during World War II. While at the facility, he played for teams in nearby Baltimore and Philadelphia.

== Post-playing career ==
Becker returned to Pittsburgh after his playing career and served as a coach at Braddock High School. Moe also coached at Greensburg Salem High school.

Becker died of complications from Alzheimer's disease on January 9, 1996, in the Camelot Nursing Home in Peoria, Arizona.

== BAA career statistics ==
Legend
GP	Games played	FG%	Field-goal percentage
FT%	Free-throw percentage	APG	Assists per game
PPG	Points per game	**Bold**	Career high

=== Regular season ===
Year	Team	GP	FG%	FT%	APG	PPG
1946–47	Pittsburgh	17	.201	.533	**.8**	**6.4**
1946–47	Boston	6	**.227**	**.750**	.2	2.2
1946–47	Detroit	**20**	.178	.300	**.8**	2.1
Career		43	.196	.500	.7	3.8
