= John Mills (basketball) =

American basketball player (1919–1995)

Personal information
- Born: September 7, 1919 Flat Lick, Kentucky, U.S.
- Died: August 25, 1995 (aged 75) Flat Lick, Kentucky, U.S.
- Listed height: 6 ft 8 in (2.03 m)
- Listed weight: 203 lb (92 kg)

Career information
- High school: Knox Central (Barbourville, Kentucky)
- College: Western Kentucky (1938–1941)
- Position: Center / forward
- Number: 11

Career history
- 1944–1946: Cleveland Allmen Transfers
- 1946–1947: Pittsburgh Ironmen
- Stats at NBA.com
- Stats at Basketball Reference

John P. Mills (September 7, 1919 – August 25, 1995) was an American professional basketball player. After a collegiate career at Western Kentucky University, Mills played for the National Basketball League's Cleveland Allmen Transfers from 1944 to 1946, then for the Pittsburgh Ironmen in the 1946–47 Basketball Association of America season.

Mills played high school basketball for Knox Central High School.

== BAA career statistics ==
Legend
GP	Games played
FG%	Field-goal percentage
FT%	Free-throw percentage
APG	Assists per game
PPG	Points per game

=== Regular season ===
Year	Team	GP	FG%	FT%	APG	PPG
1946–47	Pittsburgh	47	.294	.550	.2	3.9
Career		47	.294	.550	.2	3.9
