= Gorham Getchell =

American basketball and football player (1920–1980)

Personal information
- Born: August 14, 1920 Abington, Pennsylvania
- Died: July 7, 1980 (aged 59)
- Listed height: 6 ft 4 in (1.93 m)
- Listed weight: 205 lb (93 kg)

Career information
- High school: Jenkintown (Jenkintown, Pennsylvania)
- College: Temple (1939–1943)
- Playing career: 1946–1947
- Position: Center
- Number: 9

Career history
- 1946–1947: Pittsburgh Ironmen
- Stats at NBA.com
- Stats at Basketball Reference

Charles Gorham Getchell (August 14, 1920 – July 7, 1980) was an American professional basketball and American football player. He played one season in the Basketball Association of America (BAA) as a member of the Pittsburgh Ironmen. During the 1947 National Football League (NFL) season Getchell was a member of the Baltimore Colts. He attended Temple University.

== BAA career statistics ==
Legend
GP	Games played
FG%	Field-goal percentage
FT%	Free-throw percentage
APG	Assists per game
PPG	Points per game

=== Regular season ===
Year	Team	GP	FG%	FT%	APG	PPG
1946–47	Pittsburgh	16	.000	1.000	.0	.3
Career		16	.000	1.000	.0	.3
