= Noble Jorgensen =

American basketball player

Personal information
- Born: May 18, 1925 Columbus, Ohio, U.S.
- Died: November 2, 1982 (aged 57) Minneapolis, Minnesota, U.S.
- Listed height: 6 ft 9 in (2.06 m)
- Listed weight: 228 lb (103 kg)

Career information
- High school: Taylor Allderdice (Pittsburgh, Pennsylvania)
- College: Westminster (1943–1945); Iowa (1945–1947)
- Playing career: 1947–1953
- Position: Center
- Number: 17, 15, 13, 20, 6

Career history
- 1947: Pittsburgh Ironmen
- 1947–1948: Portland Indians
- 1948–1950: Sheboygan Red Skins
- 1950–1951: Tri-Cities Blackhawks
- 1951–1953: Syracuse Nationals

Career highlights
- PCPBL champion (1948)

Career BAA and NBA statistics
- Point: 2,363 (8.8 ppg)
- Rebounds: 862
- Assists: 915 (1.2 apg)
- Stats at NBA.com
- Stats at Basketball Reference

Noble Gordon "Jorgy" Jorgensen (May 18, 1925 – November 2, 1982) was an American professional basketball player. He was a center in the National Basketball Association (NBA) and other leagues. He was a member of Portland's first professional basketball championship when Portland Indians won the Pacific Coast Professional Basketball League in 1948. He retired from professional basketball following the 1952–53 NBA season.

He played high school basketball for Taylor Allderdice High School in Pittsburgh, Pennsylvania.

== Personal life ==
Jorgensen was the brother of former NBA player Roger Jorgensen and Byron Jorgensen who played college basketball for Ohio.

== Death ==
Jorgensen died in Minneapolis in 1982 due to an aortic aneurysm.

== BAA/NBA career statistics ==
Legend
GP	Games played	MPG	Minutes per game
FG%	Field-goal percentage	FT%	Free-throw percentage
RPG	Rebounds per game	APG	Assists per game
PPG	Points per game	**Bold**	Career high

=== Regular season ===
Year	Team	GP	MPG	FG%	FT%	RPG	APG	PPG
1946–47	Pittsburgh	15	–	.223	.640	–	.3	4.4
1949–50	Sheboygan	54	–	.353	.766	–	**1.7**	**13.0**
1950–51	Tri-Cities	22	–	.366	.706	5.1	1.2	11.2
1950–51	Syracuse	41	–	.376	.675	5.5	1.6	9.3
1951–52	Syracuse	66	**20.0**	**.413**	**.797**	**4.4**	1.0	8.0
1952–53	Syracuse	**70**	19.4	.333	.734	3.4	1.1	6.2
Career		268	19.7	.360	.742	4.3	1.2	8.8

=== Playoffs ===
Year	Team	GP	MPG	FG%	FT%	RPG	APG	PPG
1949–50	Sheboygan	3	–	.386	.600	–	**2.7**	**17.3**
1950–51	Syracuse	**7**	–	.416	.636	3.0	1.0	7.1
1951–52	Syracuse	**7**	21.4	.365	**.742**	3.9	.7	8.7
1952–53	Syracuse	2	**22.0**	**.556**	.667	**5.0**	1.5	7.0
Career		19	21.6	.399	.663	3.6	1.2	9.3
