= Stan Noszka =

American politician and basketball player

Stanley M. Noszka

Member of the Pennsylvania Senate from the 38th district
- In office 1967 – November 30, 1978
- Preceded by: George Sarraf
- Succeeded by: Leonard Bodack

Personal details
- Born: September 19, 1920 Pittsburgh, Pennsylvania, U.S.
- Died: November 15, 1991 (aged 71) Aspinwall, Pennsylvania, U.S.
- Party: Democratic
- Spouse: Gloria (Hauck) Noszka
- Children: 8
- Education: Duquesne University
- Occupation: State senator; professional basketball player
- Basketball career

Personal information
- Listed height: 6 ft 1 in (1.85 m)
- Listed weight: 185 lb (84 kg)

Career information
- College: Duquesne (1940–1943)
- Playing career: 1946–1949
- Position: Guard
- Number: 8, 11, 10

Career history
- 1946–1947: Pittsburgh Ironmen
- 1947–1949: Boston Celtics

Career BAA statistics
- Points: 660 (6.0 ppg)
- Assists: 68 (.6 apg)
- Stats at NBA.com
- Stats at Basketball Reference

Stanley Michael Noszka (September 19, 1920 – November 15, 1991) was a member of the Pennsylvania State Senate, serving from 1967 to 1978. He was also a professional basketball player in the 1940s. Noszka played for the Youngstown Bears in the National Basketball League during 1945–46, and in the Basketball Association of America for the Pittsburgh Ironmen (1946–47) and Boston Celtics (1947–48).

== BAA career statistics ==
Legend
GP	Games played	FG%	Field-goal percentage
FT%	Free-throw percentage	APG	Assists per game
PPG	Points per game	**Bold**	Career high

=== Regular season ===
Year	Team	GP	FG%	FT%	APG	PPG
1946–47	Pittsburgh	**58**	**.287**	**.694**	.7	**8.4**
1947–48	Boston	22	.278	.686	.2	3.5
1948–49	Boston	30	.244	.500	**.8**	2.5
Career		110	.280	.667	.6	6.0

=== Playoffs ===
Year	Team	GP	FG%	FT%	APG	PPG
1948	Boston	3	.333	.625	.7	8.5
Career		3	.333	.625	.7	8.5
