= Coulby Gunther =

American basketball player

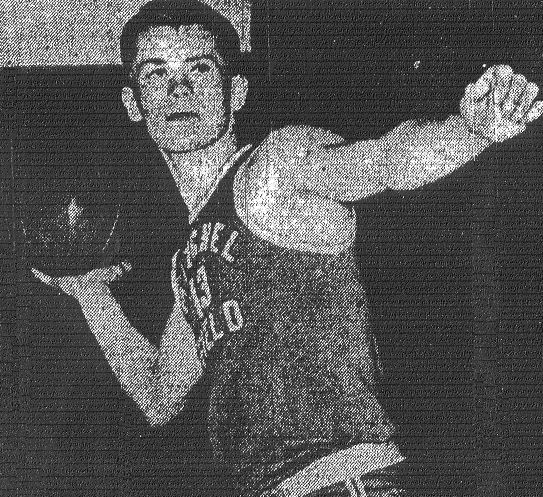

Personal information
- Born: February 5, 1923 New York City, New York, U.S.
- Died: July 14, 2005 (aged 82) Gulf Stream, Florida, U.S.
- Listed height: 6 ft 4 in (1.93 m)
- Listed weight: 190 lb (86 kg)

Career information
- High school: South Side (Rockville Centre, New York)
- College: Boston College (1941–1942)
- Playing career: 1946–1953
- Position: Forward
- Number: 6, 12
- Coaching career: 1947–1948

Career history

Playing
- 1946–1947: Pittsburgh Ironmen
- 1947–1948: Atlanta Crackers
- 1947: Hartford Hurricanes
- 1947–1948: Saratoga Indians
- 1948: Schenectady Comets
- 1948–1949: St. Louis Bombers
- 1949: Troy Celtics
- 1950–1951: Allentown Aces
- 1952–1953: Pawtucket Slaters

Coaching
- 1947–1948: Atlanta Crackers
- Stats at NBA.com
- Stats at Basketball Reference

Coulby D. Gunther (February 5, 1923 – July 14, 2005) was an American business man, paratrooper and professional basketball player. He spent two seasons in the Basketball Association of America (BAA) as a member of the Pittsburgh Ironmen (1946–47) and the St. Louis Bombers (1948–49). He played in the Professional Basketball League of America (PBLA) during the 1947–48 season, where he served as the player-coach of the Atlanta Crackers. Gunther also played for six teams in the American Basketball League (ABL). He attended Boston College.

During World War II, Gunther served as a paratrooper with the 11th Airborne Division.

== BAA career statistics ==
Legend
GP	Games played	FG%	Field-goal percentage
FT%	Free-throw percentage	APG	Assists per game
PPG	Points per game	**Bold**	Career high

=== Regular season ===
Year	Team	GP	FG%	FT%	APG	PPG
1946–47	Pittsburgh	**52**	**.336**	**.644**	.6	**14.1**
1948–49	St. Louis	32	.315	.634	**1.0**	5.0
Career		84	.332	.642	.8	10.6

=== Playoffs ===
Year	Team	GP	FG%	FT%	APG	PPG
1948–49	St. Louis	1	.000	.0	.0	.0
Career		1	.000	.0	.0	.0
