= Walt Miller (basketball) =

American basketball player (1915–2001)

Personal information
- Born: July 30, 1915 Homestead, Pennsylvania, U.S.
- Died: January 21, 2001 (aged 85) Lincoln Place, Pennsylvania, U.S.
- Listed height: 6 ft 2 in (1.88 m)
- Listed weight: 190 lb (86 kg)

Career information
- High school: Homestead (Homestead, Pennsylvania)
- College: Duquesne (1934–1937)
- Playing career: 1937–1951
- Position: Forward
- Number: 7

Career history
- 1937–1939: Pittsburgh Pirates
- 1945–1946: Youngstown Bears
- 1946–1947: Pittsburgh Ironmen
- 1947–1951: Altoona Railroaders
- Stats at NBA.com
- Stats at Basketball Reference

Walter Philip Miller (July 30, 1915 – January 21, 2001) was an American professional basketball player. He played in both the National Basketball League and Basketball Association of America after a collegiate career at Duquesne University.

== BAA career statistics ==
Legend
GP	Games played
FG%	Field-goal percentage
FT%	Free-throw percentage
APG	Assists per game
PPG	Points per game

=== Regular season ===
Year	Team	GP	FG%	FT%	APG	PPG
1946–47	Pittsburgh	12	.333	.500	.5	1.9
Career		12	.333	.500	.5	1.9
