= Pittsburgh Ironmen =

- Division: Western
- Founded: 1946
- Folded: 1947
- History: Pittsburgh Ironmen; 1946–1947
- Arena: Duquesne Gardens
- Location: Pittsburgh, Pennsylvania
Home	Away	Third

The Pittsburgh Ironmen were a charter member of the Basketball Association of America (a forerunner of the National Basketball Association). The team was based in Pittsburgh and played at Duquesne Gardens.

They ended their only season in the BAA in 1946–47 with a record of 15–45 with a .250 winning percentage, finishing in fifth and last place in the Western Division and worst overall in the league. According to Nate Silver and Reuben Fischer-Baum, applying the Elo rating system, this was, through 2017, the worst season ever by a professional basketball team in a major league, even though three notably infamous BAA/NBA seasons saw the 1947–48 Providence Steamrollers win a record low 6 total games (albeit with 42 losses for a .125 win percentage), the 1972–73 Philadelphia 76ers ending their 82-game season with only 9 wins against 73 losses for a .110 winning percentage, and the 2011–2012 Charlotte Bobcats ending their lockout-shortened season with 7 wins and 59 losses for an NBA record low .106 winning percentage.

During the BAA's first ever postseason meeting between teams since completing their first ever season, the Ironmen proclaimed that they would continue operating their franchise into the following season, but only if they could secure a "representative team" (likely meaning they could secure a new team owner) in the future going forward. Due to them being the worst team in the entire BAA that season, Pittsburgh was awarded the first overall pick in the league's inaugural 1947 draft, where they selected Clifton McNeely as the BAA/NBA's first ever #1 draft pick, though much like with the NFL's first ever #1 draft pick in 1936, Jay Berwanger, McNeely would never play in the BAA/NBA either for the Ironmen or elsewhere in that league. However, the Ironmen would fold before the start of the 1947–48 BAA season, joining the Toronto Huskies as teams that ceased operations on July 27, 1947, along with the Detroit Falcons and Cleveland Rebels, to be the first four teams to officially become defunct in the BAA/NBA.

== Season records ==
Note: W = wins, L = losses, % = win–loss %

Season	W	L	%	Playoffs	Results
Pittsburgh Ironmen (BAA)
1946–47	15	45	.250	Did not qualify	

== Personnel ==
Head coaches

- Paul Birch

Players

Name	Jersey No.	Pos.	Height (ft.)	Weight (lbs.)
John Abramovic	3	F	6' 3"	195
Moe Becker	5, 6	G-F	6' 1"	185
Mike Bytzura	4	F	6' 1"	170
Joe Fabel	15	F-G	6' 1"	190
Nat Frankel	15	F-G	6' 0"	195
Gorham Getchell	9	C	6' 4"	205
Coulby Gunther	6	G	6' 4"	190
Noble Jorgensen	17	C	6' 9"	228
Roger Jorgensen	7	C-F	6' 5"	200
Tony Kappen	5	G	5' 10"	165
Press Maravich	12	G	6' 0"	185
Ed Melvin		G	5' 9"	170
Red Mihalik	6	G	6' 0"	180
Walt Miller	7	F	6' 2"	190
John Mills	11	C-F	6' 8"	203
Stan Noszka	8	G	6' 1"	185
Harry Zeller	14, 18	C-F	6' 4"	210
