= Mike Bytzura =

American basketball player (1922–1989)

Personal information
- Born: June 18, 1922 Duquesne, Pennsylvania, U.S.
- Died: January 24, 1989 (aged 66) Duquesne, Pennsylvania, U.S.
- Listed height: 6 ft 1 in (1.85 m)
- Listed weight: 170 lb (77 kg)

Career information
- High school: Duquesne (Duquesne, Pennsylvania)
- College: Waynesburg (1942–1943); LIU Brooklyn (1943–1944)
- Playing career: 1944–1951
- Position: Forward
- Number: 4

Career history
- 1944–1946: Cleveland Allmen Transfers
- 1946–1947: Pittsburgh Ironmen
- 1947–1951: Pitt-Altoona Railroaders
- Stats at NBA.com
- Stats at Basketball Reference

Michael John Bytzura (June 18, 1922 – January 24, 1989) was an American professional basketball player who played in the National Basketball League and the Basketball Association of America, later known as the NBA. He played in college for Waynesburg University and Long Island University.

== High school career ==
Bytzura attended Duquesne High School in Duquesne, Pennsylvania where he starred at basketball. In 1941 he was named to the Western Pennsylvania Interscholastic Athletic League All-Tournament team after leading his team to the WPIAL final. During the Pennsylvania Interscholastic Athletic Association Western Regionals, he set a tournament record after scoring 38 points in a victory against Everett High School.

== College career ==
Bytzura attended Waynesburg University in 1942–1943 and was the captain of the basketball team.

== Professional career ==
During his pro career Bytzura played for the Cleveland Allmen Transfers in the National Basketball League during the 1944–45 and 1945–46 seasons. After his stay with the Allmen, he signed with the Pittsburgh Ironmen in the Basketball Association of America in 1946–47.

== BAA career statistics ==
Legend
GP	Games played
FG%	Field-goal percentage
FT%	Free-throw percentage
APG	Assists per game
PPG	Points per game

=== Regular season ===
Year	Team	GP	FG%	FT%	APG	PPG
1946–47	Pittsburgh	60	.245	.500	.5	3.5
Career		60	.244	.500	.5	3.5
