= Press Maravich =

American basketball coach and player

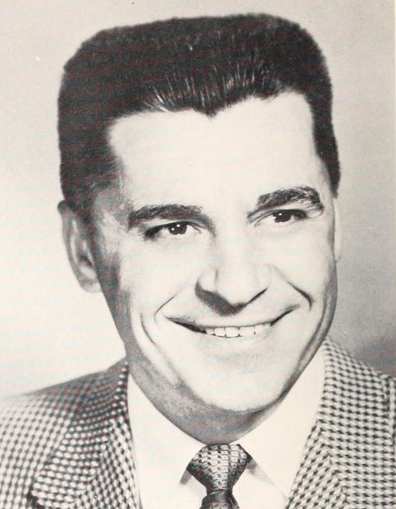

Biographical details
- Born: August 29, 1915; Aliquippa, Pennsylvania, U.S.
- Died: April 15, 1987 (aged 71); Covington, Louisiana, U.S.

Playing career
- 1938–1941: Davis & Elkins
- 1945–1946: Youngstown Bears
- 1946–1947: Pittsburgh Ironmen
- Position: Guard

Coaching career (HC unless noted)
- 1947–1949: Davis & Elkins (assistant)
- 1949–1950: West Virginia Wesleyan
- 1950–1952: Davis & Elkins
- 1952–1954: Aliquippa HS
- 1954–1956: Baldwin HS
- 1956–1962: Clemson
- 1962–1964: NC State (assistant)
- 1964–1966: NC State
- 1966–1972: LSU
- 1972–1975: Appalachian State

Head coaching record
- Overall: 232–277 (college)
- Tournaments: 1–1 (NCAA University Division); 2–2 (NIT)

Accomplishments and honors

Championships
- ACC tournament (1965)

Peter "Press" Maravich (August 29, 1915 – April 15, 1987) was an American college and professional basketball coach. He received the nickname "Press" as a boy, when one of his jobs was selling the Pittsburgh Press on the streets of his hometown of Aliquippa, Pennsylvania, an industrial city outside of Pittsburgh. Maravich Sr. also served in the United States Naval Air Corps during World War II.

Maravich graduated from Davis & Elkins College in 1941 and was a member of the Alpha Sigma Phi fraternity. He was the father of basketball player Pete Maravich.

== Playing and coaching career ==
Press Maravich was born to Serb immigrants Vojo and Sara (née Radulović) from Drežnica, a village near Ogulin in modern-day Croatia.

After college, he played professional basketball with the Youngstown Bears (1945–1946) of the National Basketball League, and the Pittsburgh Ironmen (1946–1947) of the Basketball Association of America.

Press Maravich's first head coaching job at the college level was West Virginia Wesleyan College, 1949–1950. From there he went on to become head coach of his alma mater, Davis & Elkins, from 1950 to 1952.

Maravich was head coach of the Tigers of Clemson University from 1956 to 1962. He then went to North Carolina State University to be an assistant coach under Everett Case. Maravich took over the head coaching duties when health problems, primarily cancer, forced Case to retire early in the 1964–1965 season. Maravich led the Wolfpack to the Atlantic Coast Conference title that season. Maravich left for Louisiana State University in April 1966 where he coached his son, Pete Maravich. Upon offering the LSU scholarship to "Pistol", "Press" told his boy that if he didn't sign, he should "never come home again." Pete originally wanted to go to West Virginia University but finally agreed to go to LSU if his dad bought him a car. In spite of coaching his prolific son for half of his coaching career at LSU, Maravich had an overall losing record at the school. Maravich was replaced at LSU by Dale Brown in 1972. He then went on to coach the Mountaineers of Appalachian State, shepherding them through their early years in Division I, before resigning as coach in January 1975. Maravich returned to coaching in the early 1980s as associate head coach at Campbell University.

== Death ==
In the spring of 1985, Maravich was diagnosed with prostate cancer. During a basketball clinic in Israel, signs of his condition appeared when he had begun to urinate blood. Press eventually was persuaded to receive proper treatment for his condition at Memorial Sloan-Kettering Cancer Center in New York, but he canceled before being admitted. On February 11, 1987, Press and son Pete flew to Hanover, Germany, for an experimental treatment that lasted for 11 days; symptoms such as coughing subsided while the treatment had no effect on the cancer. By this time, he became religious and took comfort in reading the bible with his son, even becoming an evangelist. Through the next two months, Press's condition deteriorated while Pete took constant care of him with his sister, Diana. Press Maravich lived his last days in Highland Park Hospital in Covington, Louisiana, where he died on April 15, 1987. "Press" Maravich lived just long enough to see Pete selected as a possible member of the Naismith Memorial Basketball Hall of Fame, but not long enough to see him officially inducted in May 1987. Pete Maravich is quoted as saying "I'll see you soon" to his father immediately after his death; Pete Maravich died nine months later on January 5, 1988.

== BAA career statistics ==
Legend
GP	Games played
FG%	Field-goal percentage
FT%	Free-throw percentage
APG	Assists per game
PPG	Points per game

=== Regular season ===
Year	Team	GP	FG%	FT%	APG	PPG
1946–47	Pittsburgh	51	.272	.517	.1	4.6
Career		51	.272	.517	.1	4.6

== Head coaching record ==
=== College ===
Record table
Season	Team	Overall	Conference	Standing	Postseason
West Virginia Wesleyan Bobcats (West Virginia Intercollegiate Athletic Conference) (1949–1950)
1949–50	West Virginia Wesleyan	14–10			
West Virginia Wesleyan:		14–10			
Davis & Elkins Senators (West Virginia Intercollegiate Athletic Conference) (1950–1952)
1950–51	Davis & Elkins	18–11			
1951–52	Davis & Elkins	19–10			
Davis & Elkins:		37–21			
Clemson Tigers (Atlantic Coast Conference) (1956–1962)
1956–57	Clemson	7–17	3–11	T–7th	
1957–58	Clemson	8–16	4–10	6th	
1958–59	Clemson	8–16	5–9	T–6th	
1959–60	Clemson	10–16	4–10	7th	
1960–61	Clemson	10–16	5–9	6th	
1961–62	Clemson	12–15	4–10	6th	
Clemson:		55–96	25–59		
NC State Wolfpack (Atlantic Coast Conference) (1964–1966)
1964–65	NC State	20–4	10–4	T–2nd	NCAA University Division Regional Third Place
1965–66	NC State	18–9	9–5	2nd	
NC State:		38–13	19–9		
LSU Tigers (Southeastern Conference) (1966–1972)
1966–67	LSU	3–23	1–17	10th	
1967–68	LSU	14–12	8–10	T–6th	
1968–69	LSU	13–13	7–11	T–7th	
1969–70	LSU	22–10	13–5	2nd	NIT Fourth Place
1970–71	LSU	14–12	10–8	3rd	
1971–72	LSU	10–16	6–12	T–7th	
LSU:		76–86	45–63		
Appalachian State Mountaineers (Southern Conference) (1972–1975)
1972–73	Appalachian State	6–20	3–8	7th	
1973–74	Appalachian State	5–20	1–11	8th	
1974–75	Appalachian State	1–11	0–5		
Appalachian State:		12–51	4–24		
Total:		232–277			
National champion Postseason invitational champion Conference regular season champion Conference regular season and conference tournament champion Division regular season champion Division regular season and conference tournament champion Conference tournament champion

== Sources ==
- Kriegel, Mark (2008). Pistol: The Life of Pete Maravich. Simon and Schuster. ISBN 9780743284981.
- Federman, Wayne; Terrill, Marshall (2008). Pete Maravich: The Authorized Biography of Pistol Pete (PDF). Tyndale House Publishers. ISBN 9781589975354.
