= Joe Fabel =

American basketball player

Personal information
- Born: May 15, 1917 Cleveland, Ohio
- Died: January 31, 1967 (aged 49) Pittsburgh, Pennsylvania
- Listed height: 6 ft 1 in (1.85 m)
- Listed weight: 190 lb (86 kg)

Career information
- High school: East (Pittsburgh, Pennsylvania)
- College: Pittsburgh (1936–1937)
- Playing career: 1946–1947
- Position: Forward / guard
- Number: 15

Career history
- 1946–1947: Pittsburgh Ironmen
- Stats at NBA.com
- Stats at Basketball Reference

Joseph A. Fabel (May 15, 1917 – January 31, 1967) was a professional basketball player. He spent one season in the Basketball Association of America (BAA) as a member of the Pittsburgh Ironmen. He attended the University of Pittsburgh.

== BAA career statistics ==
Legend
GP	Games played	FG%	Field-goal percentage
FT%	Free-throw percentage	APG	Assists per game
PPG	Points per game	**Bold**	Career high

=== Regular season ===
Year	Team	GP	FG%	FT%	APG	PPG
1946–47	Pittsburgh	30	.260	.500	.1	2.1
Career		30	.260	.500	.1	2.1
