= Norm Baker =

Canadian basketball player (1923–1989)

Personal information
- Born: February 17, 1923 Victoria, British Columbia
- Died: April 23, 1989 (aged 66) Victoria, British Columbia
- Listed height: 6 ft 0 in (1.83 m)
- Listed weight: 180 lb (82 kg)

Career information
- Playing career: 1946–1948
- Position: Guard
- Number: 16

Career history
- 1946: Chicago Stags
- 1946–1948: Vancouver Hornets
- Stats at NBA.com
- Stats at Basketball Reference

Norman Henry Baker (February 17, 1923 – April 23, 1989) was a Canadian professional basketball and lacrosse player.

== Early life and career ==
Baker started his career at the age of ten while playing for the Nanaimo Mosquitoes. He became the youngest player to win a Canadian senior national championship as the team won in 1939. As a sixteen-year-old, Baker led the Mosquitoes to a win over the Harlem Globetrotters and was called "one of the greatest natural players I have ever seen" by Globetrotters founder Abe Saperstein.

Baker won two more championships with the Mosquitoes in 1942 and 1946. While serving in the Royal Canadian Air Force, he won another championship in 1943 for the Pat Bay Gremlins. Baker set a league scoring record with the Gremlins when he posted 38 points in a game against Windsor.

== Professional career ==
Baker became professional in 1946 when he played for the Chicago Stags of the Basketball Association of America (BAA). He was released after only four games with the team. Baker stated that the main reason he did not stay was because he had trouble with his contract and was only offered $900 a month.

Baker played lacrosse for the Westminster Adanacs in 1947.

Baker played 70 games for the Vancouver Hornets of the Pacific Coast Professional Basketball League from 1947 to 1948 and averaged 28.0 points per game. He joined the New York Celtics, Stars of America and Boston Whirlwinds as the touring opponent of the Harlem Globetrotters. He played for the Whirlwinds in the 1950–51 and 1952–53 seasons.

Baker was the only non-American player on a basketball team billed as "The Stars of the World" that toured thirteen countries in Europe and Africa in 1950.

After his playing career ended, Baker worked as a police officer. He coached basketball and lacrosse.

== Legacy ==
Baker was voted as Canada's "Most Outstanding Player of the Century" in 1950.

He was inducted into the BC Sports Hall of Fame in 1966, Canadian Sports Hall of Fame in 1978, Canada Basketball Hall of Fame in 1979, and Greater Victoria Sports Hall of Fame in 1991.

== BAA career statistics ==
Legend
GP	Games played
FG%	Field-goal percentage
FT%	Free-throw percentage
APG	Assists per game
PPG	Points per game

=== Regular season ===
Year	Team	GP	FG%	FT%	APG	PPG
1946–47	Chicago	4	.000	.000	.0	.0
Career		4	.000	.000	.0	.0
