= Ed Melvin =

American basketball player (1916–2004)

Personal information
- Born: February 13, 1916 Pittsburgh, Pennsylvania, U.S.
- Died: July 30, 2004 (aged 88) Toledo, Ohio, U.S.
- Listed height: 5 ft 9 in (1.75 m)
- Listed weight: 170 lb (77 kg)

Career information
- High school: South (Pittsburgh, Pennsylvania)
- College: Duquesne (1938–1941)
- Playing career: 1941–1947
- Position: Guard
- Coaching career: 1947–1965

Career history

Playing
- 1941: Saratoga Indians
- 1941–1942: New York Celtics
- 1946–1947: Pittsburgh Ironmen

Coaching
- 1947–1953: St. Bonaventure
- 1954–1965: Toledo

Career highlights
- As player: First-team All-American – MSG (1940); As coach: 3× WNYLTC championships (1950–1952)
- Stats at NBA.com
- Stats at Basketball Reference

Edward Michael Melvin (né Milkovich; February 13, 1916 – July 30, 2004) was an American professional basketball player. He played in the Basketball Association of America for the Pittsburgh Ironmen during the 1946–47 season.

After his playing career, Melvin coached the St. Bonavanture Bonnies and Toledo Rockets men's basketball teams between 1947 and 1965. In his 17 years as an NCAA Division I head coach, Melvin compiled an overall record of 222–179, including three consecutive conference regular season championships from 1950 to 1952.

He was a southpaw; Eddie Beachler of The Pittsburgh Press described his left-handed dribble and push-shot as "deceptive", while Dan McGibbeny of Pittsburgh Post-Gazette several years after Melvin's retirement from playing recounted how he was "a sprightly lad with a rare ability to dribble left-handed for a full game."

Melvin was of Serbian origin. He legally changed his last name from Milkovich to Melvin in late 1951.

== BAA career statistics ==
Legend
GP	Games played
FG%	Field-goal percentage
FT%	Free-throw percentage
APG	Assists per game
PPG	Points per game

=== Regular season ===
Year	Team	GP	FG%	FT%	APG	PPG
1946–47	Pittsburgh	57	.263	.654	.6	4.9
Career		57	.263	.654	.6	4.9
