= List of Providence Steamrollers players =

The following is a list of players of the now-defunct Providence Steamrollers professional basketball team.

- Hank Beenders
- Bob Brown
- Tom Callahan
- Ernie Calverley
- Armand Cure
- Red Dehnert
- Bill Downey
- Johnny Ezersky
- Dick Fitzgerald
- Pop Goodwin
- Wyndol Gray
- George Grimshaw
- Chick Halbert
- Nat Hickey
- Bob Hubbard
- John Janisch
- Ken Keller
- Jerry Kelly
- Dino Martin
- Ariel Maughan
- George Mearns
- Carl Meinhold
- Elmore Morgenthaler
- George Nostrand
- Buddy O'Grady
- Fred Paine
- George Pastushok
- Les Pugh
- Mel Riebe
- Lee Robbins
- Hank Rosenstein
- Giff Roux
- Ken Sailors
- Ben Scharnus
- Otto Schnellbacher
- Earl Shannon
- Howie Shannon
- Bob Shea
- Lou Spicer
- Mel Thurston
- Andy Tonkovich
- Jack Toomay
- Brady Walker
- Jake Weber
- Ray Wertis
