= 1952–53 Pawtucket Slaters season =

- League: American Basketball League (revived original)
- Head coach: Ernie Calverley (player-coach); Earl Shannon (player-coach)
- General manager: Ernie Calverley(?); Earl Shannon(?)
- Arena: Pawtucket Armory

Results
- Record: 6–19 (.240)
- Place: Conference: 5th
- Playoff finish: Did not qualify

The 1952–53 Pawtucket Slaters season was the first and only season of play for the Pawtucket Slaters from Pawtucket, Rhode Island (although it's suggested they were originally meant to play in the capital city of Providence, Rhode Island instead) in the revived (yet clearly struggling) original version of the American Basketball League. Originally, the Slaters were meant to be joined alongside the Jersey City Titans to originally compete as one of eight teams looking to win the ABL's championship for the season, but the Titans alongside the Elmira Colonels initially left the ABL out to dry early in its original starting point for the season (to the point where the ABL briefly cancelled its 1952–53 season entirely) due to them each having players from the 1951 college basketball point-shaving scandal being a part of their teams before the Colonels decided to relent on the ABL's demands and accept the waiving of Bill Spivey on their team to have seven teams competing in the league by November 13, 1952 for what would later become its final season of existence. Even with the ABL later returning to form under a new seven-team operation by November 1952 instead, they would still see plenty of struggles occur throughout the league, as the Middletown Guards and the Hazleton / Glen Falls-Saratoga Harlem Yankees would end up folding operations to have only five teams remaining throughout the season (with the Scranton Miners briefly leaving the ABL themselves as well during the season from late December 1952 to early January 1953 as well). With all of that in mind, despite the Slaters being one of the more stable teams remaining in the ABL throughout the season, they were also one of the worst teams competing in the league as well, with them replacing player-coach Ernie Calverley (who previously played with the BAA's Providence Steamrollers) with player-coach Earl Shannon (who previously was with the Providence Steamrollers and the Boston Celtics) at some currently unknown point in time in their season in a vain attempt to be competitive in a season where trouble occurred all over the place with the ABL. In the end, Pawtucket would end their season with a 6–19 record for a fifth place finish, with the Slaters being denied a playoff spot in their only season of play and later folding operations in relation to the ABL's own closure following this season's conclusion.

== Roster ==
Due to information on American Basketball League players being generally hard to find (especially by the time the ABL was designated more as a minor league during its later years of existence), there are bound to be more gaps and/or inaccuracies found in certain areas on the team's roster spots than usual.

Player	Position(s)
Edward Bartels	F
Ernie Calverley	G
Ray Dombrosky	Unknown
George Duffy	Unknown
Jimmy Griffin	Unknown
Coulby Gunther	F
Whiffer Healey	Unknown
Henry "Dick" Hole	Unknown
Bob Hubbard	F/C
George Kaftan	SF
Jack Laub	G
Tom Levarte	Unknown
Francis Mahoney	G
George McLeod	F
Joe Montiero	Unknown
George Nostrand	F/C
Mike Pappas	Unknown
Bill Pless	F/C
Kenny Reeves	Unknown
Ray Rossi	Unknown
Earl Shannon	G/F
Randy Sharp	C
Wally Sheil	Unknown
Chuck Stewart	Unknown
Leroy Watkins	Unknown
Mike Webb	Unknown
Tom Whipple	Unknown

Note: In addition to all of these players, there were also three unknown players with the respective last names of Behrens, McGraw, and Stivers that were briefly on this team as well.

== American Basketball League Standings ==
Pos.	Team	Wins	Losses	Win %
1	Manchester British-Americans - z	19	9	.679
2	Wilkes-Barre Barons - x	20	11	.550
3	Elmira Colonels*^{[a]} - x	17	11	.607
4	Scranton Miners*^{[b]} - x	12	11	.522
5	Pawtucket Slaters	6	19	.240
6	Middletown Guards†**^{[c]}	2	5	.286
7	Hazleton / Glen Falls-Saratoga Harlem Yankees†***^{[d]}	1	11	.083

* – Team briefly dropped out of the ABL during the season before returning to the league later on within the season.
** – The Middletown Guards dropped out of the ABL on January 8, 1953 and then disbanded as a franchise two days later on January 10, 1953.
*** – The Hazleton Harlem Yankees started their season out in Hazleton, Pennsylvania before they moved out two games into their season on December 4, 1952 to move back to Saratoga Springs, New York with games also played in Glen Falls, New York to become the Glen Falls-Saratoga Harlem Yankees for the rest of their season up until they ceased operations and withdrew operations on February 6, 1953.
† – Did not survive the ABL season.

== Notes ==
^{a} The Elmira Colonels dropped out of the ABL on October 23, 1952 alongside the Jersey City Titans due to the Colonels having Bill Spivey on their roster at the time (with the Titans having multiple players that were previously a part of the 1951 college basketball point-shaving scandal themselves as well). Initially, the Colonels tried to be an exhibition team for the season, but after a few games, they decided to cut Bill Spivey from their roster in order to return to the ABL and have the league restart their season properly with seven teams playing throughout the season instead of eight teams playing this season.
^{b} The Scranton Miners previously dropped out of the ABL on December 20, 1952 due to original team owner Joe "Speed" Maloney charging other owners with evading the league's minimum guarantee of $300 per game before they reorganized themselves under a new group of management within late December 1952 before returning to the ABL by January 10, 1953, though Scranton would later withdraw operations from the league during the ABL's playoffs (with an impromptu forfeit defeat resulting in the Manchester British-Americans going into the championship round for this season) following a controversial ruling regarding a playoff match held on March 14, 1953.
^{c} The Middletown Guards dropped out of the ABL on January 8, 1953 and then disbanded as a franchise two days later on January 10, 1953.
^{d} The Hazleton Harlem Yankees started their season out in Hazleton, Pennsylvania before they moved out two games into their season on December 4, 1952 to move back to Saratoga Springs, New York with games also played in Glen Falls, New York to become the Glen Falls-Saratoga Harlem Yankees for the rest of their season up until they ceased operations and withdrew operations on February 6, 1953.
