= George Mearns =

American basketball player

Personal information
- Born: April 18, 1922 Westerly, Rhode Island, U.S.
- Died: December 27, 1997 (aged 75) Rockport, Maine, U.S.
- Listed height: 6 ft 3 in (1.91 m)
- Listed weight: 175 lb (79 kg)

Career information
- High school: Westerly (Westerly, Rhode Island)
- College: Rhode Island (1940–1943)
- Playing career: 1946–1948
- Position: Forward
- Number: 10

Career history
- 1946–1948: Providence Steamrollers
- Stats at NBA.com
- Stats at Basketball Reference

George Mearns (April 18, 1922 – December 27, 1997) was an American professional basketball player. He played for the Providence Steamrollers in the 1946–47 and 1947–48 seasons of the Basketball Association of America. He played in the November 2, 1946 game against the Boston Celtics, which was the Celtics franchise's first-ever game. Providence won the game 59–53.

Mearns, while a senior at Westerly High School in 1939–40, scored 62 points in a 158–12 win over arch rival Stonington High School.

== BAA career statistics ==
Legend
GP	Games played	FG%	Field-goal percentage
FT%	Free-throw percentage	APG	Assists per game
PPG	Points per game	**Bold**	Career high

=== Regular season ===
Year	Team	GP	FG%	FT%	APG	PPG
1946–47	Providence	**57**	**.268**	**.720**	**.6**	**6.7**
1947–48	Providence	24	.200	.484	.4	2.5
Career		81	.255	.684	.6	5.5
