= 1947–48 Philadelphia Warriors season =

BAA professional basketball team season

- Division champions
- Head coach: Edward Gottlieb
- Arena: Philadelphia Arena

Results
- Record: 27–21 (.563)
- Place: Division: 1st (Eastern)
- Playoff finish: BAA Finals (eliminated 2–4)
- Stats at Basketball Reference

Local media
- Television: WFIL-TV (George Walsh, Tom Moorehead)
- Radio: WFIL(playoffs only)

The 1947–48 Philadelphia Warriors season was the Warriors' 2nd season in the BAA (which later became the NBA). Entering this season, the Warriors sought to repeat as champions in the BAA in a shortened up 48-game schedule of play after previously winning the league's inaugural championship over the Chicago Stags in an eleven team league. By the end of their second season of play, the Warriors ended up becoming Eastern Division champions with a 27–21 record, claiming that mark by one game over the New York Knickerbockers. In the 1948 BAA playoffs, the Warriors would defeat the best team of the entire league in terms of records this season, the St. Louis Bombers, 4–3, but were ultimately upset by the only new team of the BAA that season, the Baltimore Bullets from the original American Basketball League that they had already won a championship (or two, according to them) from previously, 4–2, ending the Warriors' bid at being the first BAA team to repeat as champions in their league. With their loss to Baltimore and later seeing the original Bullets squad fold operations on November 27, 1954, the original Baltimore Bullets squad that first started out in the ABL are currently the only BAA/NBA team (as of 2025) to have folded operations while also being crowned champions of the league; that Bullets squad that beat the Warriors would also join the Chicago Stags squad that lost to the Warriors in the previous year's championship and the Washington Capitols in the following year's championship as the only BAA/NBA teams that competed for a BAA/NBA Finals championship to later fold operations altogether.

== BAA Draft ==
Round	Pick	Player	Position	Nationality	School/Club team
1	6	Chink Crossin	G	United States	Penn
–	–	Norman Butz	–	United States	St. Joseph's
–	–	Jim Kaeding	–	United States	York (PA)
–	–	Ed Koffenberger	C	United States	Duke
–	–	Jim Pollard	SF	United States	Stanford

== Roster ==
Philadelphia Warriors 1947–48 roster
Players

Pos.	No.	Player	Height	Weight	DOB	From
F/C	15	Hank Beenders	6 ft 6 in (1.98 m)	185 lb (84 kg)	1916-06-02	LIU Brooklyn
F	14	Stan Brown	6 ft 3 in (1.91 m)	200 lb (91 kg)	1929-06-27	South Philadelphia HS (PA)
G	7	Chink Crossin	6 ft 1 in (1.85 m)	165 lb (75 kg)	1924-07-04	Penn
F	12	Howie Dallmar	6 ft 4 in (1.93 m)	200 lb (91 kg)	1922-05-24	Stanford
SG	6	Jerry Fleishman	6 ft 2 in (1.88 m)	190 lb (86 kg)	1922-02-14	NYU
PF	10	Joe Fulks	6 ft 5 in (1.96 m)	190 lb (86 kg)	1921-10-26	Murray State
C	20	Chick Halbert	6 ft 9 in (2.06 m)	225 lb (102 kg)	1919-02-27	West Texas A&M
C	18	Art Hillhouse	6 ft 7 in (2.01 m)	220 lb (100 kg)	1916-06-12	LIU Brooklyn
G/F	9	Ralph Kaplowitz	6 ft 2 in (1.88 m)	170 lb (77 kg)	1919-05-18	NYU
G	5	Angelo Musi	5 ft 9 in (1.75 m)	145 lb (66 kg)	1918-07-25	Temple
F	7	Bob O'Brien	6 ft 4 in (1.93 m)	190 lb (86 kg)	1927-01-26	Pepperdine
F/C	19	Jack Rocker	6 ft 5 in (1.96 m)	185 lb (84 kg)	1922-08-12	California
PG	8	George Senesky	6 ft 2 in (1.88 m)	179 lb (81 kg)	1922-04-04	Saint Joseph's

Coaches
Head coach

Edward Gottlieb

Legend
- (DP) Unsigned draft pick
- (FA) Free agent
- (S) Suspended
- Injured

Roster

== Regular season ==
=== Season standings ===
#	Eastern Division				
#	Team	W	L	PCT	GB
1	x-Philadelphia Warriors	27	21	.563	–
2	x-New York Knicks	26	22	.542	1
3	x-Boston Celtics	20	28	.417	7
4	Providence Steamrollers	6	42	.125	21

=== Game log ===
#	Date	Opponent	Score	High points	Record
1	November 13	Providence	W 79–64	Joe Fulks (23)	1–0
2	November 14	@ Boston	W 79–74 (OT)	Joe Fulks (26)	2–0
3	November 15	@ Providence	W 80–78	Joe Fulks (23)	3–0
4	November 19	@ Washington	L 67–74	Joe Fulks (25)	3–1
5	November 20	Boston	L 57–67	Joe Fulks (21)	3–2
6	November 22	@ New York	W 83–78	Dallmar, Fulks (22)	4–2
7	November 27	New York	L 59–81	Joe Fulks (24)	4–3
8	November 28	@ Chicago	L 71–75	Joe Fulks (22)	4–4
9	December 3	Baltimore	L 58–73	Chick Halbert (11)	4–5
10	December 9	Providence	W 78–74 (OT)	Joe Fulks (22)	5–5
11	December 11	St. Louis	L 69–74	Joe Fulks (28)	5–6
12	December 12	@ Boston	L 67–69	Joe Fulks (23)	5–7
13	December 15	@ New York	W 74–71	Chick Halbert (19)	6–7
14	December 18	New York	L 71–99	Joe Fulks (18)	6–8
15	December 20	@ Providence	W 80–74	Joe Fulks (17)	7–8
16	December 26	Providence	W 89–61	Joe Fulks (24)	8–8
17	December 27	@ Washington	L 70–72	Joe Fulks (26)	8–9
18	December 30	@ Boston	L 64–70	Joe Fulks (31)	8–10
19	January 1	@ Baltimore	W 72–60	Joe Fulks (23)	9–10
20	January 2	Washington	W 69–60	Joe Fulks (30)	10–10
21	January 4	@ St. Louis	L 66–80	Joe Fulks (16)	10–11
22	January 9	Chicago	L 60–77	Angelo Musi (24)	10–12
23	January 10	@ Washington	L 99–106 (OT)	Joe Fulks (29)	10–13
24	January 16	Baltimore	W 72–63	Dallmar, Fulks (14)	11–13
25	January 17	@ Baltimore	W 79–77	Joe Fulks (23)	12–13
26	January 19	@ New York	W 63–57	Joe Fulks (23)	13–13
27	January 20	St. Louis	W 82–59	Joe Fulks (22)	14–13
28	January 22	Boston	L 54–61	Joe Fulks (18)	14–14
29	January 27	@ Boston	W 77–68	Joe Fulks (21)	15–14
30	January 29	New York	L 60–66	Joe Fulks (20)	15–15
31	January 31	@ St. Louis	W 66–60	Joe Fulks (18)	16–15
32	February 1	@ Chicago	W 85–78	Joe Fulks (37)	17–15
33	February 5	Washington	L 60–72	Joe Fulks (19)	17–16
34	February 7	@ St. Louis	L 54–67	Jerry Fleishman (9)	17–17
35	February 8	@ Chicago	L 74–80 (2OT)	Angelo Musi (21)	17–18
36	February 12	Boston	W 69–60	Fleishman, Senesky (15)	18–18
37	February 14	@ New York	L 47–78	Angelo Musi (16)	18–19
38	February 19	Washington	W 84–76	Chick Halbert (20)	19–19
39	February 24	Baltimore	W 83–71	Howie Dallmar (19)	20–19
40	February 26	Chicago	W 89–80	Howie Dallmar (18)	21–19
41	February 28	@ Providence	W 83–82	Chick Halbert (21)	22–19
42	March 2	New York	W 76–66	Joe Fulks (31)	23–19
43	March 4	Boston	W 82–62	Joe Fulks (18)	24–19
44	March 9	Chicago	L 79–93	Joe Fulks (24)	24–20
45	March 11	St. Louis	W 92–74	Joe Fulks (31)	25–20
46	March 13	@ Baltimore	L 62–64	Joe Fulks (20)	25–21
47	March 16	@ Baltimore	W 100–78	Howie Dallmar (32)	26–21
48	March 18	Providence	W 88–57	Joe Fulks (35)	27–21

== Playoffs ==
1948 playoff game log
BAA Semifinals: 4–3 (home: 2–1; road: 2–2)

Game	Date	Team	Score	High points	High assists	Location	Series
1	March 23	@ St. Louis	L 58–60	Joe Fulks (18)	Howie Dallmar (3)	St. Louis Arena	0–1
2	March 25	@ St. Louis	W 65–64	George Senesky (20)	Howie Dallmar (2)	St. Louis Arena	1–1
3	March 27	St. Louis	W 84–56	Joe Fulks (30)	Howie Dallmar (5)	Philadelphia Arena	2–1
4	March 30	St. Louis	L 51–56	Joe Fulks (21)	Howie Dallmar (2)	Philadelphia Arena	2–2
5	April 1	@ St. Louis	L 62–69	Joe Fulks (17)	Howie Dallmar (2)	St. Louis Arena	2–3
6	April 3	St. Louis	W 84–61	Joe Fulks (23)	Howie Dallmar (5)	Philadelphia Arena	3–3
7	April 6	@ St. Louis	W 85–46	Joe Fulks (15)	Chink Crossin (4)	St. Louis Arena	4–3

BAA Finals: 2–4 (home: 2–1; road: 0–3)

Game	Date	Team	Score	High points	High assists	Location Attendance	Series
1	April 10	Baltimore	W 71–60	Chick Halbert (19)	Howie Dallmar (3)	Philadelphia Arena; 7,201	1–0
2	April 13	Baltimore	L 63–66	Joe Fulks (27)	Dallmar, Musi (2)	Philadelphia Arena; 6,982	1–1
3	April 15	@ Baltimore	L 70–72	Joe Fulks (21)	Kaplowitz, Dallmar (2)	Baltimore Coliseum; 4,500	1–2
4	April 17	@ Baltimore	L 75–78	Joe Fulks (29)	Howie Dallmar (3)	Baltimore Coliseum; 4,500	1–3
5	April 20	Baltimore	W 91–82	Joe Fulks (19)	Howie Dallmar (4)	Philadelphia Arena; 6,012	2–3
6	April 21	@ Baltimore	L 73–88	Joe Fulks (28)	Howie Dallmar (2)	Baltimore Coliseum; 4,500	2–4

1948 schedule

== Transactions ==
=== Purchases ===
Player	Date purchased	Former team
Kenny Sailors	November, 1947	Chicago Stags
Hank Beenders	January 15, 1948	Providence Steamrollers

=== Sales ===
Player	Date sold	New team
Jerry Rullo	October 14, 1947	Baltimore Bullets
Kenny Sailors	December 1, 1947	Providence Steamrollers

== Awards and records ==
- Joe Fulks, All-NBA First Team
- Howie Dallmar, All-NBA First Team
