= Bill Downey =

American basketball player

Personal information
- Born: November 11, 1923
- Died: September 5, 2015 (aged 91)
- Listed height: 6 ft 6 in (1.98 m)
- Listed weight: 210 lb (95 kg)

Career information
- College: Marquette (1942–1944)
- Playing career: 1947–1948
- Position: Center

Career history
- 1947–1948: Providence Steamrollers
- Stats at NBA.com
- Stats at Basketball Reference

William K. Downey (November 11, 1923 – September 5, 2015) was an American professional basketball player.

He played for the Providence Steamrollers of the Basketball Association of America for three games during the 1947–48 season. Downey played at the collegiate level with what are now the Marquette Golden Eagles, and also played basketball with Naval Station Great Lakes.

== BAA career statistics ==
Legend
GP	Games played
FG%	Field-goal percentage
FT%	Free-throw percentage
APG	Assists per game
PPG	Points per game

=== Regular season ===
Year	Team	GP	FG%	FT%	APG	PPG
1947–48	Providence	3	.000	.000	.0	.0
Career		3	.000	.000	.0	.0
