= Pop Goodwin =

American basketball player (1920–2005)

Personal information
- Born: December 22, 1920 Brooklyn, New York, U.S.
- Died: May 17, 2005 (aged 84) Walden, New York, U.S.
- Listed height: 6 ft 2 in (1.88 m)
- Listed weight: 203 lb (92 kg)

Career information
- High school: St. John's Prep (Brooklyn, New York)
- Playing career: 1946–1948
- Position: Forward / center
- Number: 11

Career history
- 1946–1948: Providence Steamrollers
- 1947–1948: Scranton Miners
- Stats at NBA.com
- Stats at Basketball Reference

Wilfred Russell "Pop" Goodwin (December 22, 1920 – May 17, 2005) was an American professional basketball player. He spent two seasons in the Basketball Association of America (BAA) as a member of the Providence Steamrollers from 1946 to 1948.

== BAA career statistics ==
Legend
GP	Games played	FG%	Field-goal percentage
FT%	Free-throw percentage	APG	Assists per game
PPG	Points per game	**Bold**	Career high

=== Regular season ===
Year	Team	GP	FG%	FT%	APG	PPG
1946–47	Providence	**55**	**.282**	**.800**	**.3**	**4.7**
1947–48	Providence	24	.232	.704	**.3**	3.8
Career		79	.266	.775	.3	4.4
