= Earl Shannon =

American basketball player and coach (1921–2002)

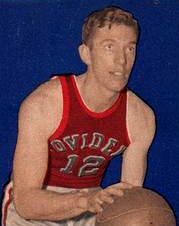
- Shannon in 1948

Personal information
- Born: November 23, 1921 Providence, Rhode Island, U.S.
- Died: July 8, 2002 (aged 80) Warwick, Rhode Island, U.S.
- Listed height: 5 ft 11 in (1.80 m)
- Listed weight: 170 lb (77 kg)

Career information
- High school: Pawtucket (Pawtucket, Rhode Island)
- College: Rhode Island (1940–1943)
- Playing career: 1946–1953
- Position: Guard
- Number: 12, 5

Career history

Playing
- 1946–1949: Providence Steamrollers
- 1949: Boston Celtics
- 1952–1953: Pawtucket Slaters

Coaching
- 1953–1954: Providence (assistant)
- 1963–1964: Bryant
- Stats at NBA.com
- Stats at Basketball Reference

Earl F. Shannon (November 23, 1921 – July 8, 2002) was an American professional basketball player and college coach. He played for the Providence Steamrollers of the Basketball Association of America for three seasons, before being released by the team in 1949 and signing with the Boston Celtics. In three seasons as a player he averaged 8.6 points and 1.3 assists per game.

In one year as Bryant University's head coach (1963–64), the program's first-ever season, the Bulldogs went 12–11. In other coaching roles he served as the University of Rhode Island's freshman basketball coach and an assistant on Providence College's varsity men's basketball squad.

Shannon was also an agent for the Federal Bureau of Investigation.

== BAA career statistics ==
Legend
GP	Games played	FG%	Field-goal percentage
FT%	Free-throw percentage	APG	Assists per game
PPG	Points per game	**Bold**	Career high

=== Regular season ===
Year	Team	GP	FG%	FT%	APG	PPG
1946–47	Providence	**57**	**.339**	.566	**1.5**	**12.1**
1947–48	Providence	45	.262	.634	1.1	8.0
1948–49	Providence	27	.276	**.704**	**1.5**	3.8
1948–49	Boston	5	.182	.250	.8	1.0
Career		134	.305	.598	1.3	8.6

== Head coaching record ==
Record table
Season	Team	Overall	Conference	Standing	Postseason
**Bryant Indians** (Independent) (1963–1964)
1963–64	Bryant	12–11			
Total:		12–11			
National champion Postseason invitational champion Conference regular season champion Conference regular season and conference tournament champion Division regular season champion Division regular season and conference tournament champion Conference tournament champion
