= 1947–48 Providence Steamrollers season =

- Head coach: Albert Soar (2–17); Nat Hickey (4–25)
- Owner: Louis Pieri
- Arena: Rhode Island Auditorium

Results
- Record: 6–42 (.125)
- Place: Division: 4th (Eastern)
- Playoff finish: Did not qualify
- Stats at Basketball Reference
- Radio: WPRO

The 1947–48 Providence Steamrollers season was the second season of the Providence Steamrollers. This season is also infamous for the lowest number of wins by a team in BAA/NBA history with only six total wins recorded by the Steamrollers throughout this entire season. The only other NBA teams to end their seasons with single-digit victories as of 2026 are the 1972–73 Philadelphia 76ers, the 1998–99 Vancouver Grizzlies, the 1998–99 Los Angeles Clippers, and the 2011–12 Charlotte Bobcats, who hold the worst win percentage in NBA history. This season is also noteworthy for featuring the oldest player in BAA/NBA history, with head coach Nat Hickey suiting up for two games with the Steamrollers near his 46th birthday, making him the oldest player in league history at 45 years, 363 days old. That record still stands as of 2026, though the current oldest player that's poised to threaten that record (if he's willing to do so) is future legendary Hall of Famer LeBron James. While the Steamrollers would, in effect, be eliminated from playoff contention by December 1947 due to all three of the defending champion Philadelphia Warriors, New York Knicks, and Boston Celtics each getting seven wins within that month, Providence wouldn't officially be eliminated from qualifying for the 1948 BAA playoffs until February 1948 due to the Steamrollers getting their 29th loss of the season, which would subsequently become the point where Providence would fail to qualify for the playoffs that season over the nearby Boston Celtics.

== Draft picks ==
| Round | Pick | Player | Position | Nationality | College |
|---|---|---|---|---|---|
| 1 | 4 | Walt Dropo | – | United States | Connecticut |
| – | – | Joe Barry | – | United States | Unknown |
| – | – | Dick Furey | – | United States | St. Thomas |
| 2 | 14 | Bob Hubbard | F/C | United States | Springfield |
| – | – | Bob Joyce | – | United States | Bates |
| – | – | Roy Lipscomb | – | United States | St. Mary's |
| – | – | John Mills | – | United States | Hofstra |
| – | – | Al Nichols | – | United States | Rhode Island |

== Roster ==
1947–48 Providence Steamrollers roster
Players

| Pos. | No. | Player | Height | Weight | DOB | From |
|---|---|---|---|---|---|---|
| G | 3 | Ernie Calverley | 5 ft 10 in (1.78 m) | 145 lb (66 kg) | 1924-01-30 | Rhode Island |
| C | | Bill Downey | 6 ft 6 in (1.98 m) | 210 lb (95 kg) | 1923-11-11 | Marquette |
| G/F | 10 | Johnny Ezersky | 6 ft 3 in (1.91 m) | 175 lb (79 kg) | 1922-3-21 | Rhode Island |
| F | 16 | Dick Fitzgerald | 6 ft 2 in (1.88 m) | 175 lb (79 kg) | 1920-11-18 | Seton Hall |
| F/C | 11 | Pop Goodwin | 6 ft 2 in (1.88 m) | 203 lb (92 kg) | 1920-12-22 | St. John's Prep (NY) |
| G/F | | Wyndol Gray | 6 ft 1 in (1.85 m) | 175 lb (79 kg) | 1922-03-20 | Harvard |
| G/F | 11 | Nat Hickey | 5 ft 11 in (1.80 m) | 180 lb (82 kg) | 1902-01-30 | Hoboken HS (NJ) |
| F/C | 9 | Bob Hubbard | 6 ft 6 in (1.98 m) | 215 lb (98 kg) | 1922-12-27 | Springfield |
| G/F | | John Janisch | 6 ft 3 in (1.91 m) | 200 lb (91 kg) | 1920-03-15 | Valparaiso |
| F | 13 | Jerry Kelly | 6 ft 2 in (1.88 m) | 172 lb (78 kg) | 1918-06-14 | Marshall |
| G | 4 | Dino Martin | 5 ft 8 in (1.73 m) | 160 lb (73 kg) | 1920-05-25 | Georgetown |
| F | 10 | George Mearns | 6 ft 3 in (1.91 m) | 175 lb (79 kg) | 1922-04-18 | Rhode Island |
| F/C | 9–14 | George Nostrand | 6 ft 8 in (2.03 m) | 195 lb (88 kg) | 1924-01-25 | Wyoming |
| F | 7–9 | Lee Robbins | 6 ft 3 in (1.91 m) | 175 lb (79 kg) | 1922-02-11 | Colorado |
| G | 5 | Ken Sailors | 5 ft 10 in (1.78 m) | 175 lb (79 kg) | 1921-01-14 | Wyoming |
| G/F | 12 | Earl Shannon | 5 ft 11 in (1.80 m) | 170 lb (77 kg) | 1921-11-23 | Rhode Island |
| G | | Mel Thurston | 6 ft 0 in (1.83 m) | 175 lb (79 kg) | 1919-01-16 | Canisius |
| F/C | | Jack Toomay | 6 ft 6 in (1.98 m) | 215 lb (98 kg) | 1922-08-09 | Pacific |
| G | 8 | Ray Wertis | 5 ft 11 in (1.80 m) | | 1922-01-01 | St. John's |

Coaches
Head coach

Nat Hickey

Legend
- (DP) Unsigned draft pick
- (FA) Free agent
- (S) Suspended
- Injured

Roster

== Regular season ==
=== Season standings ===
| # | Eastern Division | | | | |
| # | Team | W | L | PCT | GB |
|---|---|---|---|---|---|
| 1 | x-Philadelphia Warriors | 27 | 21 | .563 | – |
| 2 | x-New York Knicks | 26 | 22 | .542 | 1 |
| 3 | x-Boston Celtics | 20 | 28 | .417 | 7 |
| 4 | Providence Steamrollers | 6 | 42 | .125 | 21 |

=== Game log ===
| # | Date | Opponent | Score | High points | Record |
| 1 | November 13 | @ Philadelphia | L 64–79 | Ernie Calverley (13) | 0–1 |
| 2 | November 15 | Philadelphia | L 78–80 | Earl Shannon (19) | 0–2 |
| 3 | November 18 | New York | L 69–87 | Ernie Calverley (24) | 0–3 |
| 4 | November 20 | @ St. Louis | L 67–73 | Calverley, Goodwin (19) | 0–4 |
| 5 | November 22 | Boston | L 62–65 | Ernie Calverley (14) | 0–5 |
| 6 | November 27 | Baltimore | L 61–76 | Calverley, Martin (12) | 0–6 |
| 7 | November 29 | Washington | W 85–78 | Ernie Calverley (21) | 1–6 |
| 8 | December 2 | St. Louis | L 66–86 | Ariel Maughan (15) | 1–7 |
| 9 | December 5 | @ Boston | L 69–73 | Ernie Calverley (23) | 1–8 |
| 10 | December 6 | New York | L 85–114 | Ken Sailors (22) | 1–9 |
| 11 | December 9 | @ Philadelphia | L 74–78 | Ken Sailors (22) | 1–10 |
| 12 | December 13 | Washington | L 72–88 | Ernie Calverley (18) | 1–11 |
| 13 | December 17 | @ Boston | L 66–67 | Ernie Calverley (23) | 1–12 |
| 14 | December 20 | Philadelphia | L 74–80 | Ken Sailors (20) | 1–13 |
| 15 | December 23 | New York | W 66–58 | Ernie Calverley (17) | 2–13 |
| 16 | December 25 | @ New York | L 75–89 | Ken Sailors (19) | 2–14 |
| 17 | December 26 | @ Philadelphia | L 61–89 | Earl Shannon (13) | 2–15 |
| 18 | December 27 | Boston | L 63–74 | George Nostrand (16) | 2–16 |
| 19 | December 30 | Chicago | L 73–85 | Dino Martin (19) | 2–17 |
| 20 | January 3 | Chicago | L 76–79 | George Nostrand (28) | 2–18 |
| 21 | January 6 | @ Baltimore | L 64–82 | Ernie Calverley (18) | 2–19 |
| 22 | January 10 | Boston | W 70–57 | Johnny Ezersky (20) | 3–19 |
| 23 | January 15 | Baltimore | L 78–98 | Ken Sailors (20) | 3–20 |
| 24 | January 18 | @ St. Louis | L 61–70 | Johnny Ezersky (14) | 3–21 |
| 25 | January 22 | @ Chicago | W 56–50 | George Nostrand (16) | 4–21 |
| 26 | January 24 | @ Washington | L 60–69 | Bob Hubbard (17) | 4–22 |
| 27 | January 27 | St. Louis | L 61–94 | George Nostrand (13) | 4–23 |
| 28 | January 28 | @ New York | L 73–75 | George Nostrand (27) | 4–24 |
| 29 | January 30 | @ Boston | W 79–69 | Ken Sailors (17) | 5–24 |
| 30 | January 31 | Baltimore | L 62–68 | Nostrand, Sailors (16) | 5–25 |
| 31 | February 3 | New York | L 62–78 | Lee Robbins (17) | 5–26 |
| 32 | February 4 | @ New York | L 69–108 | Johnny Ezersky (18) | 5–27 |
| 33 | February 5 | @ Baltimore | L 74–100 | Ken Sailors (21) | 5–28 |
| 34 | February 7 | @ Washington | L 64–86 | Johnny Ezersky (16) | 5–29 |
| 35 | February 10 | Washington | L 60–79 | George Nostrand (14) | 5–30 |
| 36 | February 11 | @ New York | L 63–86 | Bob Hubbard (14) | 5–31 |
| 37 | February 13 | @ Boston | L 73–79 | Ernie Calverley (20) | 5–32 |
| 38 | February 15 | @ Chicago | W 85–79 | Mel Thurston (21) | 6–32 |
| 39 | February 19 | @ St. Louis | L 69–78 | Jack Toomay (14) | 6–33 |
| 40 | February 21 | Chicago | L 73–92 | Ernie Calverley (20) | 6–34 |
| 41 | February 28 | Philadelphia | L 82–83 | Ken Sailors (19) | 6–35 |
| 42 | March 7 | @ Chicago | L 81–89 | Ken Sailors (19) | 6–36 |
| 43 | March 9 | St. Louis | L 69–75 | Ernie Calverley (20) | 6–37 |
| 44 | March 13 | Boston | L 64–86 | Ken Sailors (16) | 6–38 |
| 45 | March 16 | Philadelphia | L 78–100 | Jack Toomay (15) | 6–39 |
| 46 | March 17 | @ Washington | L 67–82 | Jack Toomay (18) | 6–40 |
| 47 | March 18 | @ Philadelphia | L 57–88 | Jack Toomay (17) | 6–41 |
| 48 | March 20 | @ Baltimore | L 58–75 | Jack Toomay (21) | 6–42 |

== Player statistics ==
Legend
| GP | Games played | GS | Games started | MPG | Minutes per game |
| FG% | Field-goal percentage | 3P% | 3-point field-goal percentage | FT% | Free-throw percentage |
| RPG | Rebounds per game | APG | Assists per game | SPG | Steals per game |
| BPG | Blocks per game | PPG | Points per game |

| Player | GP | FG% | FT% | APG | PPG |
|---|---|---|---|---|---|
| Hank Beenders | 21 | .265 | .638 | .3 | 6.8 |
| Ernie Calverley | 47 | .271 | .665 | 2.5 | 11.9 |
| Bill Downey | 3 | .000 | .000 | .0 | .0 |
| Johnny Ezersky | 25 | .253 | .606 | .6 | 10.1 |
| Dick Fitzgerald | 1 | .000 | .000 | .0 | .0 |
| Pop Goodwin | 24 | .232 | .704 | .3 | 3.8 |
| Wyndol Gray | 1 | .000 | .000 | .0 | 0.0 |
| Nat Hickey | 2 | .000 | .667 | .0 | 1.0 |
| Bob Hubbard | 28 | .291 | .692 | .4 | 5.4 |
| John Janisch | 7 | .302 | .571 | .3 | 4.9 |
| Jerry Kelly | 3 | .300 | .000 | .0 | 2.0 |
| Dino Martin | 32 | .238 | .450 | .4 | 3.2 |
| Ariel Maughan | 14 | .242 | .688 | .1 | 3.9 |
| George Mearns | 24 | .200 | .484 | .4 | 2.5 |
| George Nostrand | 45 | .297 | .540 | .7 | 11.6 |
| Lee Robins | 31 | .277 | .548 | .2 | 6.3 |
| Kenny Sailors | 41 | .300 | .692 | 1.4 | 12.7 |
| Earl Shannon | 45 | .262 | .634 | 1.1 | 8.0 |
| Mel Thurston | 14 | .283 | .500 | 0.3 | 5.6 |
| Jack Toomay | 14 | .361 | .690 | 0.4 | 10.9 |
| Ray Wertis | 7 | .181 | .429 | 0.9 | 4.6 |

== Transactions ==
=== Trades ===
| December 30, 1947 | To Providence Steamrollers Wyndol Gray | To St. Louis Bombers Ariel Maughan |

=== Purchases ===
| Player | Date purchased | Former team |
|---|---|---|
| Kenny Sailors | December 1, 1947 | Philadelphia Warriors |

=== Sales ===
| Player | Date sold | New team |
|---|---|---|
| Coulby Gunther | November 9, 1947 | St. Louis Bombers |
| Hank Beenders | January 15, 1948 | Philadelphia Warriors |

=== Free agency ===
==== Subtractions ====
| Player | Reason left | New team |
|---|---|---|
| Elmore Morgenthaler | Waived | Birmingham Skyhawks (PBLA) |
