= Mel Thurston =

American basketball player (1919–1997)

Personal information
- Born: January 16, 1919 Lockport, New York, U.S.
- Died: October 8, 1997 (aged 78) Lockport, New York, U.S.
- Listed height: 6 ft 0 in (1.83 m)
- Listed weight: 175 lb (79 kg)

Career information
- High school: Lockport (Lockport, New York)
- College: Canisius (1940–1943)
- Playing career: 1946–1949
- Position: Guard

Career history
- 1946–1948: Tri-Cities Blackhawks
- 1948: Providence Steamrollers
- 1948–1949: Saratoga Indians
- Stats at NBA.com
- Stats at Basketball Reference

John Melvin Thurston (January 16, 1919 – October 8, 1997) was an American professional basketball player. Thurston played for the Tri-Cities Blackhawks between 1946 and 1948 when they were still in the National Basketball League, then played for the Providence Steamrollers of the Basketball Association of America during the second half of the 1947–48 BAA season. Due to the unique status of the first season of the Tri-Cities Blackhawks as a team, Thurston would be one of nine players from the team's inaugural season to only play for the Blackhawks during that same season as opposed to either also or only playing for the Buffalo Bisons precursor team from 1946 as well.

== BAA career statistics ==
Legend
GP	Games played
FG%	Field-goal percentage
FT%	Free-throw percentage
APG	Assists per game
PPG	Points per game

=== Regular season ===
Year	Team	GP	FG%	FT%	APG	PPG
1947–48	Providence	14	.283	.500	.3	5.6
Career		14	.283	.500	.3	5.6
