= Bob Shea =

American basketball player

Personal information
- Born: September 11, 1924 Mystic, Connecticut, U.S.
- Died: January 27, 2015 (aged 90) Hingham, Massachusetts, U.S.
- Listed height: 6 ft 2 in (1.88 m)
- Listed weight: 194 lb (88 kg)

Career information
- High school: Stonington (Stonington, Connecticut)
- College: Rhode Island (1943–1946)
- Playing career: 1946–1947
- Position: Forward
- Number: 15

Career history
- 1946–1947: Providence Steamrollers
- Stats at NBA.com
- Stats at Basketball Reference

Robert Francis Shea (September 11, 1924 – January 27, 2015) was an American professional basketball player. He played for the Providence Steamrollers in the Basketball Association of America during the 1946–47 season. He averaged 2.2 points and 0.1 assists per game.

Born in Mystic, Connecticut, Shea attended Stonington High School where he played football. When the school added a basketball team in 1939, he had never even held a basketball until he appeared at the try-out. After starring at Stonington, he attended the University of Rhode Island (known then as Rhode Island State College), playing basketball under coach Frank Keaney. Shea was the co-captain for the 1946 squad that lost the NIT championship game to Kentucky. He was inducted into the URI athletic hall of fame in 1979.

After college, Shea went on to play professionally for the Providence Steamrollers in the inaugural season of the Basketball Association of America, which a few years later became the National Basketball Association. On November 2, 1946, the BAA's opening night, Shea scored the first basket of the game against the Boston Celtics. He went on to play in 43 games that season, scoring 93 points.

While playing for Providence, Shea continued schooling and got his master's degree, and worked as a Social Studies teacher at Stonington High School for 35 years. He died in 2015 from complications of Parkinson's disease.

== BAA career statistics ==
Legend
GP	Games played
FG%	Field-goal percentage
FT%	Free-throw percentage
APG	Assists per game
PPG	Points per game

=== Regular season ===
Year	Team	GP	FG%	FT%	APG	PPG
1946–47	Providence	43	.242	.576	.1	2.2
Career		43	.242	.576	.1	2.2
