= Rhode Island Rams men's basketball =

College basketball team

| 2026–27 Rhode Island Rams men's basketball team |
- University: University of Rhode Island
- Head coach: Archie Miller (5th season)
- Location: Kingston, Rhode Island
- Arena: Ryan Center (capacity: 7,657)
- Conference: Atlantic 10
- Nickname: Rams
- Colors: Keaney blue, navy blue, and white
- Student section: Rhody Ruckus

NCAA Division I tournament Elite Eight
- 1998
Other NCAA Division I tournament results
| Sweet Sixteen | 1988, 1998 |
| Appearances | 1961, 1966, 1978, 1988, 1993, 1997, 1998, 1999, 2017, 2018 |

Conference tournament champions
- 1999, 2017

Conference regular-season champions
- 1938, 1939, 1940, 1941, 1942, 1943, 1946, 1950, 1961, 1966, 1968, 1972, 1981, 2018

Uniforms
| Home | Away | Alternate |

The Rhode Island Rams men's basketball team is a college basketball program that competes in NCAA Division I and the Atlantic 10 Conference. The team was recently under the direction of head coach Archie Miller. The Rams play their home games at the Ryan Center (capacity 7,657) which opened in 2002.

The Rams experienced their greatest success by making the Elite Eight in 1998, pulling within 3 points of making their first Final Four in just their 7th appearance before ultimately losing to Stanford.

== Current coaching staff ==
| Name | Title | College | First season |
|---|---|---|---|
| Archie Miller (basketball) | Head coach | NC State | 2022 |
| Duane Woodward | Assistant coach | Boston College | 2022 |
| Austin Carroll | Assistant coach | American | 2019 |
| Kenny Johnson (basketball) | Assistant coach | Maryland | 2022 |
| Vacant | Graduate Assistant Coach | – | – |

== All-Americans ==
Rhode Island has had three All-Americans in its history.

| Player | Count | Years |
|---|---|---|
| Stan Modzelewski | 2 | 1941 (second-team); 1942 (second-team) |
| Chet Jaworski | 1 | 1939 (first team) |
| Sly Williams | 1 | 1979 (second-team) |

== Postseason ==
=== NCAA tournament results ===
The Rams have appeared in ten NCAA tournaments. They have a combined 8–10 record. Tom Garrick holds the Rhode Island single-tournament game scoring record with 29 points in 1988 during a march to the Sweet Sixteen. The eighth-seeded 1997–98 Rams, led by senior guards Tyson Wheeler and Cuttino Mobley, had the best tournament run in school history, making it to the Elite Eight. Six head coaches have led Rhode Island to the NCAA Tournament with four of them registering tourney wins. Success in basketball fell off after the 1998 season, with the Rams making the tournament in 1999 but losing in the First Round. The team saw a brief resurgence in the mid-2010s under head coach Dan Hurley, qualifying for the NCAA tournament in both 2017 and 2018 and both times successfully defeating their First Round opponents and advancing to the Second Round.

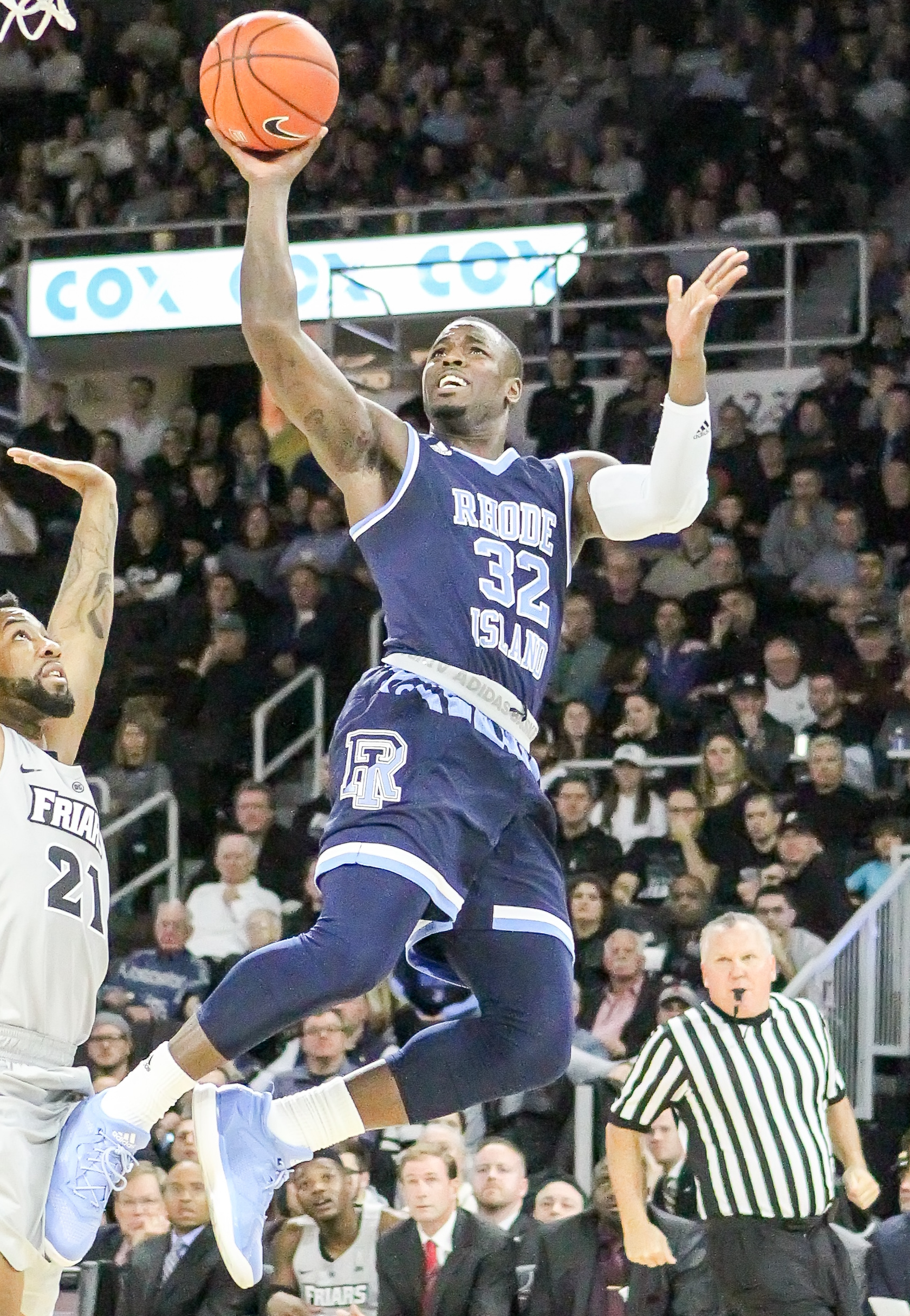
Jared Terrell

| Year | Seed | Round | Opponent | Result |
|---|---|---|---|---|
| 1961 | | First Round | St. Bonaventure | L 76–86 |
| 1966 | | First Round | Davidson | L 65–95 |
| 1978 | | First Round | Duke | L 62–63 |
| 1988 | #11 | First Round; Second Round; Sweet Sixteen | #6 Missouri #3 Syracuse #2 Duke | W 87–80; W 97–94; L 72–73 |
| 1993 | #8 | First Round; Second Round | #9 Purdue #1 North Carolina | W 74–68; L 67–112 |
| 1997 | #9 | First Round | #8 Purdue | L 76–83^{OT} |
| 1998 | #8 | First Round; Second Round; Sweet Sixteen; Elite Eight | #9 Murray State #1 Kansas #13 Valparaiso #2 Stanford | W 97–74; W 80–75; W 74–68; L 77–79 |
| 1999 | #12 | First Round | #5 Charlotte | L 70–81^{OT} |
| 2017 | #11 | First Round; Second Round | #6 Creighton #3 Oregon | W 84–72; L 72–75 |
| 2018 | #7 | First Round; Second Round | #10 Oklahoma #2 Duke | W 83–78^{OT} L 62–87 |

=== NIT results ===
The Rams have appeared in the National Invitation Tournament (NIT) 15 times. Their combined record is 14–16. The Rams reached the NIT semifinals three times (1945, 1946, and 2010) with their best showing being runner-up in the 1946 final. Seven head coaches have led Rhode Island to the NIT with four of them recording wins.

| Year | Round | Opponent | Result |
|---|---|---|---|
| 1941 | First Round | Seton Hall | L 54–70 |
| 1942 | Quarterfinals | Toledo | L 71–82 |
| 1945 | Quarterfinals; Semifinals; 3rd Place Game | Tennessee; DePaul; St. John's | W 51–44; L 53–97; L 57–64 |
| 1946 | Quarterfinals; Semifinals; Final | Bowling Green; Muhlenberg; Kentucky | W 82–79; W 59–49; L 45–46 |
| 1979 | First Round | Maryland | L 65–67^{3OT} |
| 1981 | First Round | Purdue | L 58–84 |
| 1987 | First Round | Florida State | L 92–107 |
| 1992 | First Round; Second Round; Quarterfinals | Vanderbilt; Boston College; Utah | W 68–63; W 81–80^{2OT} L 72–84 |
| 1996 | First Round; Second Round; Quarterfinals | Marist; College of Charleston; Saint Joseph's | W 82–77; W 62–58^{OT} L 59–76 |
| 2003 | First Round; Second Round | Seton Hall; Temple | W 61–60; L 53–61 |
| 2004 | Opening Round; First Round | Boston University; West Virginia | W 80–52; L 72–79 |
| 2008 | First Round | Creighton | L 73–74 |
| 2009 | First Round; Second Round | Niagara; Penn State | W 68–62; L 72–83 |
| 2010 | First Round; Second Round; Quarterfinals; Semifinals | Northwestern; Nevada; Virginia Tech; North Carolina | W 76–64; W 85–83; W 79–72; L 67–68^{OT} |
| 2015 | First Round; Second Round | Iona; Stanford | W 88–75; L 65–74 |

=== CBI results ===
The Rams have appeared in the College Basketball Invitational (CBI) one time. Their record is 1–1.

| Year | Round | Opponent | Result |
|---|---|---|---|
| 2011 | First Round; Quarterfinals | Miami (OH); UCF | W 76–59; L 54–66 |

== NBA players ==
| Years | Name | NBA Team(s) |
|---|---|---|
| 1946–1947 | Armand Cure | Providence Steamrollers |
| 1946–1947 | Bob Shea | Providence Steamrollers |
| 1946–1948 | George Mearns | Providence Steamrollers |
| 1943–1949 | Stan Stutz | Baltimore Bullets |
| 1946–1949 | Ernie Calverley | Providence Steamrollers |
| 1946–1952 | Johnny Ezersky | Baltimore Bullets, Boston Celtics, Providence Steamrollers |
| 1946–1953 | Earl Shannon | Providence Steamrollers, Boston Celtics |
| 1970–1971 | Claude English | Portland Trail Blazers |
| 1979–1985 | Sly Williams | New York Knicks, Atlanta Hawks, Boston Celtics |
| 1988–1998 | Tom Garrick | Dallas Mavericks, Los Angeles Clippers, Minnesota Timberwolves, San Antonio Spurs |
| 1998–2008 | Tyson Wheeler | Denver Nuggets |
| 1998–2008 | Cuttino Mobley | Houston Rockets, Orlando Magic, Sacramento Kings, Los Angeles Clippers |
| 1998–2010 | Sean Colson | Atlanta Hawks, Houston Rockets |
| 1999–2014 | Lamar Odom | Los Angeles Clippers, Miami Heat, Los Angeles Lakers, Dallas Mavericks |
| 2014–2018 | Xavier Munford | Memphis Grizzlies, Milwaukee Bucks |
| 2018–2019 | Jared Terrell | Minnesota Timberwolves |
| 2021–2022 | Jeff Dowtin | Golden State Warriors, Milwaukee Bucks, Orlando Magic, Toronto Raptors |
| 2023–2025 | Jacob Toppin | New York Knicks, Atlanta Hawks |

== International players ==
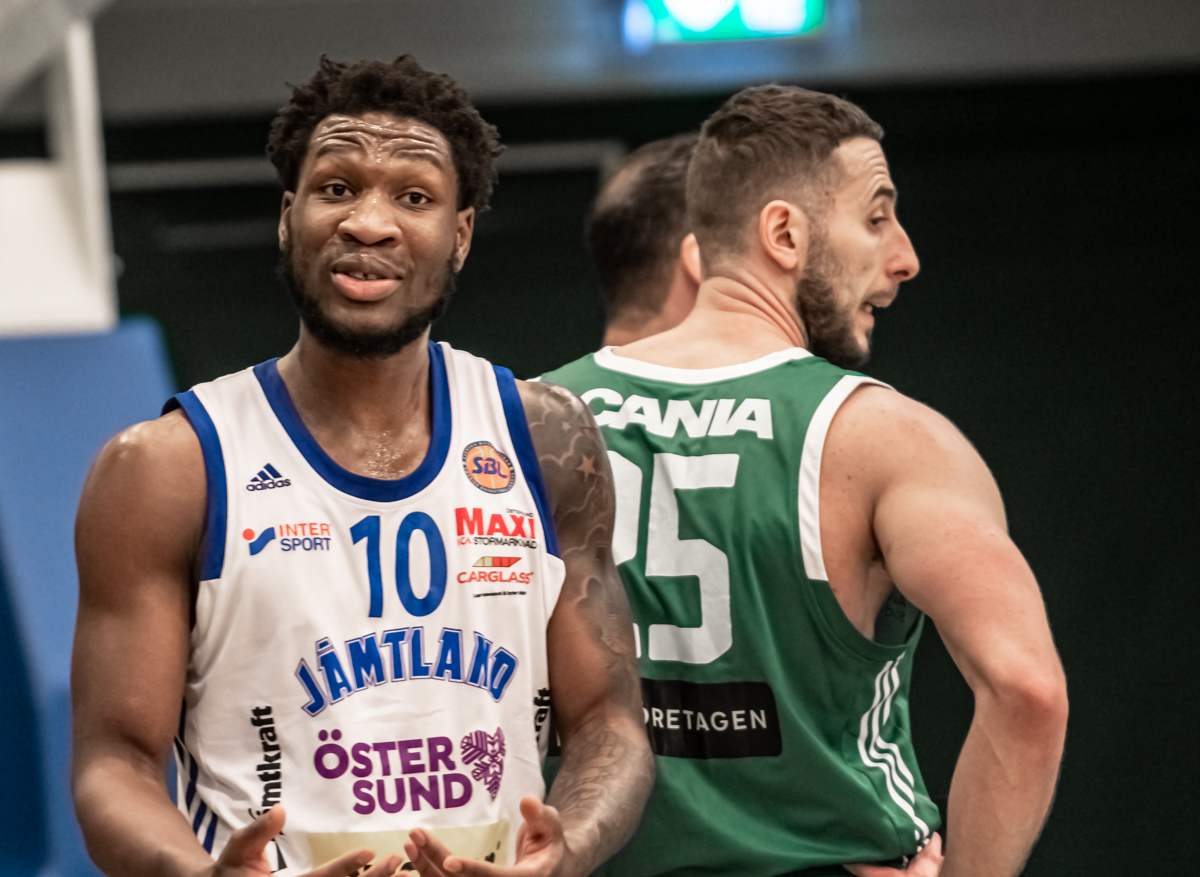
Cyril Langevine

- David Bernsley (born 1969), American-Israeli basketball player
- Cyril Langevine (born 1998), Guyanese–American basketball player in the Israeli Basketball Premier League
- E. C. Matthews (born 1995), basketball player in Super League Basketball
- Xavier Munford (born 1992), basketball player for Hapoel Tel Aviv of the Israeli Basketball Premier League
- Jared Terrell (born 1995), basketball player in the Israeli Basketball Premier League
- Jacob Toppin (born 2000), basketball forward in the Israeli Basketball Premier League, formerly in the NBA

== Participations in FIBA competitions ==
- 1978 FIBA Intercontinental Cup: 5th place
