= Dino Martin =

American basketball coach (1920–1999)

Personal information
- Born: May 25, 1920 Newport, Rhode Island, U.S.
- Died: July 24, 1999 (aged 79) Bonita Springs, Florida, U.S.
- Listed height: 5 ft 8 in (1.73 m)
- Listed weight: 160 lb (73 kg)

Career information
- High school: La Salle Academy (Providence, Rhode Island)
- College: Georgetown (1939–1942)
- Position: Guard
- Number: 4
- Coaching career: 1953–1962

Career history

Playing
- 1946–1948: Providence Steamrollers

Coaching
- 1953–1962: Boston College
- Stats at NBA.com
- Stats at Basketball Reference

Career coaching record
- NCAA: 109–102 (.517)

Patrick Donald "Dino" Martin (May 25, 1920 – July 24, 1999) was an American professional basketball player and coach. He coached the Boston College Eagles men's basketball team from 1953 to 1962.

Martin was born in Newport, Rhode Island. A graduate of the La Salle Academy, he played forward for the Georgetown Hoyas from 1939–1942. He averaged 6.6 points per game his senior season and 4.3 points per game for his career. He, Buddy O'Grady, and Al Lujack were the first Georgetown players to play professionally. He played for the Providence Steamrollers of the Basketball Association of America (BAA), the direct forerunner to the National Basketball Association (NBA), from 1946 to 1948. He averaged 12.2 points per game in his rookie season, but only averaged 3.2 in his second and final year in the league.

Martin coached tennis and basketball at the La Salle Academy for three years before moving to Boston College. Under his leadership the Eagles had a 109–102 record and made the NCAA tournament in 1958.

Martin left Boston College after the 1961–62 season to become Kirtland Country Club's tennis professional and coordinator of sports. There, Martin became close friends with fellow tennis pro Harry Kenney. Kenney's son, Douglas Kenney worked for Martin at Kirtland while Kenney was in high school. He worked at Kirtland for 17 years before moving to Florida.

Martin died in Bonita Springs, Florida, in 1999.

== BAA career statistics ==
Legend
GP	Games played	FG%	Field-goal percentage
FT%	Free-throw percentage	APG	Assists per game
PPG	Points per game	**Bold**	Career high

=== Regular season ===
Year	Team	GP	FG%	FT%	APG	PPG
1946–47	Providence	**60**	**.304**	**.661**	**1.0**	**12.2**
1947–48	Providence	32	.238	.450	.4	3.2
Career		92	.294	.638	.8	9.1
