= Lee Robbins =

American basketball player

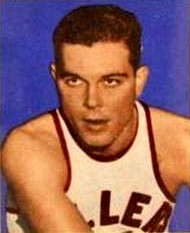
- Robbins in 1948

Personal information
- Born: February 11, 1922 Rockwall, Texas, U.S.
- Died: April 8, 1968 (aged 46) Billings, Montana, U.S.
- Listed height: 6 ft 3 in (1.91 m)
- Listed weight: 175 lb (79 kg)

Career information
- High school: Greeley (Greeley, Colorado)
- College: Colorado (1940–1942, 1945–1947)
- BAA draft: 1947: undrafted
- Playing career: 1947–1949
- Position: Forward
- Number: 9, 7, 12

Career history
- 1947–1949: Providence Steamrollers
- Stats at NBA.com
- Stats at Basketball Reference

Lee Roy Robbins (February 11, 1922 – April 8, 1968) was an American professional basketball player. He spent two seasons in the Basketball Association of America (BAA) as a member of the Providence Steam Rollers (1947–1949). He attended the University of Colorado.

Robbins was found shot and killed in Billings, Montana on April 8, 1968. Gary L. Quigg was convicted of killing Robbins after Robbins discovered him breaking into his car. Quigg was sentenced to life in prison but was paroled in 2006. Quigg had previously been released, but his parole had been revoked for drug and alcohol violations.

== BAA career statistics ==
Legend
GP	Games played	FG%	Field-goal percentage
FT%	Free-throw percentage	APG	Assists per game
PPG	Points per game	**Bold**	Career high

=== Regular season ===
Year	Team	GP	FG%	FT%	APG	PPG
1947–48	Providence	**31**	.277	.548	.2	**6.3**
1948–49	Providence	16	**.360**	**.647**	**.8**	1.8
Career		47	.284	.564	.4	4.8
