= Hank Beenders =

Dutch-American basketball player

Personal information
- Born: July 2, 1916 Haarlem, Netherlands
- Died: October 27, 2003 (aged 87) Somerville, New Jersey
- Listed height: 6 ft 6 in (1.98 m)
- Listed weight: 185 lb (84 kg)

Career information
- High school: North Plainfield (North Plainfield, New Jersey)
- College: LIU Brooklyn (1939–1942)
- Playing career: 1945–1950
- Position: Forward / center
- Number: 6, 15

Career history
- 1945–1946: Paterson Crescents
- 1946–1948: Providence Steamrollers
- 1948: Philadelphia Warriors
- 1948: Boston Celtics
- 1949–1950: Hartford Hurricanes
- Stats at NBA.com
- Stats at Basketball Reference

Henry Gerald Beenders (June 2, 1916 – October 27, 2003) was a Dutch-American professional basketball player.

== Early life ==
Beenders was born in Haarlem, Netherlands, and migrated to the United States at age eight. He lived in Brooklyn, New York, and Scotch Plains, New Jersey, before moving to Bridgewater Township, New Jersey, in the late 1960s. He attended North Plainfield High School in North Plainfield, New Jersey.

== Playing career ==
Beenders played the center position on the 1941 NIT champion Long Island University team, and was team captain during the 1941–42 season under Hall of Fame coach Clair Bee. He served with the United States Army Air Forces during World War II. Beenders was one of the first international basketball players in the Basketball Association of America (BAA), which became the National Basketball Association (NBA). Beenders averaged 12.3 points in his rookie season with Providence, which was 13th best in the league that season. He played for Providence the following season until he was sold to the Philadelphia Warriors on January 15, 1948. On May 1, 1948, Beenders was traded to the Boston Celtics with Chick Halbert for Ed Sadowski.

== Later life ==
After ending his basketball career, Beenders worked as an international sales representative for a clothing exporting company in New York City for 35 years. He was 87 when he died at the Somerset Medical Center in Somerville, New Jersey.

== BAA career statistics ==
Legend
GP	Games played	FG%	Field-goal percentage
FT%	Free-throw percentage	APG	Assists per game
PPG	Points per game	**Bold**	Career high

=== Regular season ===
Year	Team	GP	FG%	FT%	APG	PPG
1946–47	Providence	**58**	.262	**.704**	**.6**	**12.3**
1947–48	Providence	21	.265	.638	.3	6.8
1947–48	Philadelphia	24	**.333**	.583	.3	2.5
1948–49	Boston	8	.214	.778	.4	2.4
Career		111	.265	.687	.5	8.4

=== Playoffs ===
Year	Team	GP	FG%	FT%	APG	PPG
1948	Philadelphia	12	.229	.538	.3	1.9
Career		12	.229	.538	.3	1.9
