= Lou Spicer =

American basketball player (1922–1981)

Personal information
- Born: November 12, 1922 Watertown, New York, U.S.
- Died: June 23, 1981 (aged 58)
- Listed height: 6 ft 2 in (1.88 m)
- Listed weight: 195 lb (88 kg)

Career information
- High school: Watertown (Watertown, New York)
- College: Syracuse (1944–1945)
- Playing career: 1946–1947
- Position: Forward
- Number: 5

Career history
- 1946–1947: Providence Steamrollers
- Stats at NBA.com
- Stats at Basketball Reference

Lewis Graves Spicer III (November 12, 1922 – June 23, 1981) was an American professional basketball player who spent one season in the Basketball Association of America (BAA) as a member of the Providence Steam Rollers during the 1946–47 season. He attended Syracuse University.

== BAA career statistics ==
Legend
GP	Games played	FG%	Field-goal percentage
FT%	Free-throw percentage	APG	Assists per game
PPG	Points per game	**Bold**	Career high

=== Regular season ===
Year	Team	GP	FG%	FT%	APG	PPG
1946–47	Providence	4	.000	.500	.0	.3
Career		4	.000	.500	.0	.3
