= Red Dehnert =

American basketball player and coach

Personal information
- Born: January 24, 1924 New York City, New York
- Died: September 23, 1994 (aged 70) San Francisco, California
- Listed height: 6 ft 3 in (1.91 m)
- Listed weight: 175 lb (79 kg)

Career information
- College: St. John's; Columbia (1943–1944)
- Playing career: 1946–1949
- Position: Forward

Career history

Playing
- 1946–1947: Providence Steamrollers
- 1947: Newark Bobcats
- 1947–1948: Chattanooga Majors
- 1948: Wilkes-Barre Barons
- 1948–1949: Pottsville Packers
- 1949: Lancaster Rockets

Coaching
- 1947–1948: Chattanooga Majors
- 1948–1949: Pottsville Packers

Career highlights
- As player-coach: EPBL champion (1949)
- Stats at NBA.com
- Stats at Basketball Reference

Robert Edward "Red" Dehnert (January 24, 1924 – September 23, 1994) was an American professional basketball player. He played for the Providence Steamrollers for 10 games during the 1946–47 BAA season. He is the nephew of Hall of Fame player Dutch Dehnert.

Dehnert served as the Pottsville Packers' player-coach in 1948–49. That season, the Packers won the Eastern Professional Basketball League championship against the Harrisburg Senators, three games to two in a best-of-five series.

== BAA career statistics ==
Legend
GP	Games played
FG%	Field-goal percentage
FT%	Free-throw percentage
APG	Assists per game
PPG	Points per game

=== Regular season ===
Year	Team	GP	FG%	FT%	APG	PPG
1946–47	Providence	10	.400	.333	.0	1.4
Career		10	.400	.333	.0	1.4
