= Armand Cure =

American basketball and football player (1919–2003)

Personal information
- Born: August 1, 1919 New Bedford, Massachusetts, U.S.
- Died: November 28, 2003 (aged 84) Long Beach, California, U.S.
- Listed height: 6 ft 0 in (1.83 m)
- Listed weight: 198 lb (90 kg)

Career information
- High school: New Bedford (New Bedford, Massachusetts)
- College: Rhode Island (1940–1942)
- Playing career: 1946–1947
- Position: Forward
- Number: 14

Career history
- 1946–1947: Providence Steamrollers
- Stats at NBA.com
- Stats at Basketball Reference

Armand Arthur Cure (August 1, 1919 – November 28, 2003) was an American professional basketball and football player. He spent one season in each sport, first for the Providence Steam Rollers of the Basketball Association of America (BBA) during the 1946–47 BBA season and later in 1947 during the All-America Football Conference (AAFC) season as a member of the Baltimore Colts. He attended the University of Rhode Island.

== BAA career statistics ==
Legend
GP	Games played
FG%	Field-goal percentage
FT%	Free-throw percentage
APG	Assists per game
PPG	Points per game

=== Regular season ===
Year	Team	GP	FG%	FT%	APG	PPG
1946–47	Providence	12	.267	.667	.0	.8
Career		12	.267	.667	.0	.8
