= Tom Callahan =

American basketball player

Personal information
- Born: June 2, 1921 Stamford, Connecticut, U.S.
- Died: October 3, 1996 (aged 75) Stamford, Connecticut, U.S.
- Listed height: 6 ft 1 in (1.85 m)
- Listed weight: 180 lb (82 kg)

Career information
- College: Rockhurst (1940–1943)
- Playing career: 1946–1947
- Position: Guard
- Number: 7

Career history
- 1946–1947: Providence Steamrollers
- Stats at NBA.com
- Stats at Basketball Reference
Medals
Men's baseball
Representing United States
Baseball World Cup
Bronze medal – third place	1939 Cuba	Team

Thomas Francis Callahan (June 2, 1921 – October 3, 1996) was an American professional basketball player. He played collegiately for Rockhurst University. Callahan played for the Providence Steamrollers in the BAA for 13 games during the 1946–47 season.

Callahan also played baseball, and was selected to the United States national team that participated in the 1939 Amateur World Series in Havana, Cuba.

== BAA career statistics ==
Legend
GP	Games played
FG%	Field-goal percentage
FT%	Free-throw percentage
APG	Assists per game
PPG	Points per game

=== Regular season ===
Year	Team	GP	FG%	FT%	APG	PPG
1946–47	Providence	13	.207	.417	.3	1.3
Career		13	.207	.417	.3	1.3
