= 1946–47 Providence Steamrollers season =

- Head coach: Robert Morris
- General manager: Joe Fay
- Owner: Louis Pieri
- Arena: Rhode Island Auditorium

Results
- Record: 28–32 (.467)
- Place: Division: 4th (Eastern)
- Playoff finish: Did not qualify
- Radio: WPRO

The 1946–47 Providence Steamrollers season was the first season of the Providence Steamrollers. Pieri would operate the Providence Steamrollers franchise within the Basketball Association of America (BAA) as a last-ditch effort for the city of Providence, Rhode Island to have their own major professional sports franchise following what was considered to be the renaissance of professional sports following the end of World War II after he had operated the Rhode Island Reds in the American Hockey League (AHL), which was a minor league operation to the bigger National Hockey League (NHL). Similar to the nearby Boston Celtics, Providence had intended for Frank Keaney to coach the Steamrollers franchise, but they instead opted to give the head coach role to Pawtucket High School head coach and physics teacher Robert Morris, with Morris opting to take a leave of absence on his teaching duties in order to accept his head coaching role with the team. Throughout the season, Morris coached a system similar to Keaney's system from Rhode Island State University for what could be considered the modern-day run-and-gun system in track-meet basketball (or as what Morris himself had described it at the time, "Civil War basketball") that caused them to be third in scoring behind only the Washington Capitols and Chicago Stags (utilizing major advantages of the system for its time), but dead last in defense this season (which showcased why it was limited during this era of basketball). As such, the Steamrollers would finish the season with a 28–32 record, being five games behind the New York Knickerbockers for the third and final playoff spot in the Eastern Division this season; this later turned out to be the team's best season in the franchise's history, as they would later see woeful production in their following seasons afterward (including a season with the lowest number of wins in BAA/NBA history with only 6 total victories) before the BAA later merged operations with the older National Basketball League (NBL) in 1949 to create the modern-day National Basketball Association (NBA) without the Steamrollers at hand. Greater details on their first season would be explored in Charley Rosen's book called "The First Tip-Off: The Incredible Story of the Birth of the NBA", with an entire chapter dedicated to the Steamrollers' first season in the BAA alongside the various highs and lows (mostly lows) that would eventually lead them to their eventual downfall.

== Roster ==
Due to this being the first season in the franchise's history, the BAA didn't utilize a draft system like they would in future seasons of the BAA/NBA and instead relied upon some combination of the head coach and the general manager of the team finding and signing players in time to start out their training camp period for the season. For the Steamrollers, both head coach Robert Morris and general manager Joe Fay looked at players that team owner Louis Pieri had already sought after within Rhode Island State University (Earl Shannon, George Mearns, Armand Cure, Bob Shea, and Ernie Calverley), with Pop Goodwin from St. John's Preparatory School and Dino Martin from Georgetown University being the only other players to stay on the team for the long-term, while the other guys that were on the original ten-man roster to start out the season before later being replaced at certain points throughout the season once they found better-looking players along the way included Tom Callahan from Rockhurst College, Ken Keller from St. John's University, and Red Dehnert from Columbia University.

1946–47 Providence Steamrollers roster
Players

Pos.	No.	Player	Height	Weight	DOB	From
F/C	6	Hank Beenders	6 ft 6 in (1.98 m)	185 lb (84 kg)	1916-06-02	Long Island
G	7	Tom Callahan	6 ft 1 in (1.85 m)	180 lb (82 kg)	1921-06-02	Rockhurst
G	3	Ernie Calverley	5 ft 10 in (1.78 m)	145 lb (66 kg)	1924-01-30	Rhode Island
F	14	Armand Cure	6 ft 0 in (1.83 m)	198 lb (90 kg)	1919-08-01	Rhode Island
F	8	Red Dehnert	6 ft 3 in (1.91 m)	175 lb (79 kg)	1924-01-24	Columbia
F/C	11	Pop Goodwin	6 ft 2 in (1.88 m)	203 lb (92 kg)	1920-12-22	St. John's Prep (NY)
G	14	Woody Grimshaw	6 ft 1 in (1.85 m)	185 lb (84 kg)	1919-09-24	Brown
G	9	Ken Keller	6 ft 1 in (1.85 m)	180 lb (82 kg)	1922-08-16	St. John's
G	4	Dino Martin	5 ft 8 in (1.73 m)	160 lb (73 kg)	1920-05-25	Georgetown
F	10	George Mearns	6 ft 3 in (1.91 m)	175 lb (79 kg)	1922-04-18	Rhode Island
C	7	Elmore Morgenthaler	6 ft 9 in (2.06 m)	230 lb (104 kg)	1922-08-03	Boston College
G	5	George Pastushok	6 ft 1 in (1.85 m)	195 lb (88 kg)	1922-07-13	St. John's
F	8	Hank Rosenstein	6 ft 4 in (1.93 m)	185 lb (84 kg)	1920-06-16	CCNY
G/F	12	Earl Shannon	5 ft 11 in (1.80 m)	170 lb (77 kg)	1921-11-23	Rhode Island
F	15	Bob Shea	6 ft 2 in (1.88 m)	194 lb (88 kg)	1924-09-11	Rhode Island
F	5	Lou Spicer	6 ft 2 in (1.88 m)	195 lb (88 kg)	1922-11-12	Syracuse
C	9	Jake Weber	6 ft 6 in (1.98 m)	225 lb (102 kg)	1918-03-18	Purdue

Coaches
Head coach
- Robert Morris

Legend
- (DP) Unsigned draft pick
- (FA) Free agent
- (S) Suspended
- Injured

Roster

== Regular season ==
=== Season standings ===
#	Eastern Division				
#	Team	W	L	PCT	GB
1	x-Washington Capitols	49	11	.817	–
2	x-Philadelphia Warriors	35	25	.583	14
3	x-New York Knicks	33	27	.550	16
4	Providence Steamrollers	28	32	.467	21
5	Boston Celtics	22	38	.367	27
6	Toronto Huskies	22	38	.367	27

=== Game log ===
1946–47 game log
Total: 28–32
November

Game	Date	Team	Score	High points	Location Attendance	Record
1	November 2	Boston	W 59–53	Dino Martin (18)		1–0
2	November 7	Chicago	W 73–65	Earl Shannon (19)		2–0
3	November 9	Pittsburgh	W 76–66	Ernie Calverley (18)		3–0
4	November 11	@ Pittsburgh	L 71–84	George Mearns (18)		3–1
5	November 13	@ Detroit	W 70–68	Dino Martin (20)		4–1
6	November 15	@ Toronto	L 68–85	Dino Martin (14)		4–2
7	November 16	Detroit	L 59–70	Ernie Calverley (23)		4–3
8	November 21	Washington	L 58–66	George Mearns (16)		4–4
9	November 23	St. Louis	L 59–65	Earl Shannon (19)		4–5
10	November 25	@ Boston	W 71–59	Dino Martin (23)		5–5
11	November 28	New York	L 58–60	Earl Shannon (20)		5–6
12	November 30	Toronto	W 79–65	Earl Shannon (22)		6–6

December

Game	Date	Team	Score	High points	Location Attendance	Record
13	December 3	@ Philadelphia	L 68–76	Earl Shannon (18)		6–7
14	December 4	@ Washington	L 62–80	Hank Beenders (24)		6–8
15	December 7	Toronto	L 59–68	Beenders, Calverley (13)		6–9
16	December 11	@ New York	L 68–83	Dino Martin (22)		6–10
17	December 14	Detroit	W 81–66	Dino Martin (19)		7–10
18	December 19	Chicago	W 81–77	Earl Shannon (21)		8–10
19	December 21	New York	W 63–61	Pop Goodwin (16)		9–10
20	December 26	Washington	L 66–78	Hank Beenders (16)		9–11
21	December 28	Boston	W 80–68	Dino Martin (22)		10–11

January

Game	Date	Team	Score	High points	Location Attendance	Record
22	January 2	@ Philadelphia	L 72–84	Hank Beenders (19)		10–12
23	January 4	Philadelphia	W 78–74	Ernie Calverley (17)		11–12
24	January 8	@ Washington	L 69–77	Beenders, Martin (15)		11–13
25	January 9	Cleveland	W 91–68	Dino Martin (40)		12–13
26	January 11	Boston	L 72–73	Earl Shannon (21)		12–14
27	January 14	@ Cleveland	W 78–74	Ernie Calverley (23)		13–14
28	January 15	@ Pittsburgh	L 53–65	Hank Beenders (15)		13–15
29	January 19	@ St. Louis	L 53–69	Hank Beenders (20)		13–16
30	January 23	@ Chicago	L 76–97	Ernie Calverley (24)		13–17
31	January 24	@ Toronto	W 96–93	Ernie Calverley (29)		14–17
32	January 27	@ Pittsburgh	L 63–71	Earl Shannon (17)		14–18
33	January 29	@ Detroit	W 83–73	Dino Martin (26)		15–18
34	January 30	@ St. Louis	W 82–70	Dino Martin (23)		16–18

February

Game	Date	Team	Score	High points	Location Attendance	Record
35	February 1	Pittsburgh	W 89–73	Earl Shannon (28)		17–18
36	February 4	@ Philadelphia	L 68–75	Hank Rosenstein (25)		17–19
37	February 6	St. Louis	L 65–73	Earl Shannon (18)		17–20
38	February 8	Philadelphia	W 67–58	Ernie Calverley (20)		18–20
39	February 11	@ Cleveland	L 76–85	Beenders, Martin (18)		18–21
40	February 12	@ Detroit	L 64–84	Ernie Calverley (20)		18–22
41	February 13	@ Chicago	L 79–81	Ernie Calverley (20)		18–23
42	February 15	Pittsburgh	W 82–72	Ernie Calverley (31)		19–23
43	February 19	@ New York	W 69–62	Earl Shannon (21)		20–23
44	February 20	Washington	L 74–82	Dino Martin (25)		20–24
45	February 22	Cleveland	W 85–77	Ernie Calverley (21)		21–24
46	February 23	@ Boston	W 67–55	Ernie Calverley (18)		22–24
47	February 25	@ Toronto	L 60–83	Ernie Calverley (10)		22–25
48	February 27	New York	L 65–73	Hank Beenders (16)		22–26

March

Game	Date	Team	Score	High points	Location Attendance	Record
49	March 1	Detroit	W 80–74	Ernie Calverley (26)		23–26
50	March 3	@ St. Louis	L 70–71 (OT)	Dino Martin (21)		23–27
51	March 4	@ Cleveland	L 76–82	Hank Beenders (22)		23–28
52	March 8	@ Chicago	L 81–107	Ernie Calverley (18)		23–29
53	March 10	@ Boston	W 87–70	Beenders, Calverley (20)		24–29
54	March 13	Toronto	W 71–64	Calverley, Shannon (17)		25–29
55	March 15	St. Louis	W 60–56	Earl Shannon (18)		26–29
56	March 19	@ Washington	L 95–96 (OT)	Dino Martin (22)		26–30
57	March 20	Cleveland	W 76–73	Ernie Calverley (29)		27–30
58	March 22	Philadelphia	L 82–103	Ernie Calverley (22)		27–31
59	March 26	@ New York	L 84–91 (2OT)	Dino Martin (24)		27–32
60	March 29	Chicago	W 83–79	Hank Rosenstein (24)		28–32

== Transactions ==
=== Purchases ===
Player	Date bought	Previous team
Jake Weber	December 2, 1946	New York Knicks
Ralph Kaplowitz	January 26, 1947	New York Knicks

== Season losses ==
Throughout this season, the Providence Steamrollers only had an average total of 2,596 paid attendees per game, with net receipts totaling up to $117,740 for the season and estimated losses totaling up to around $140,000 for this season. Despite the high amount of money lost during that period of time, the Steamrollers would be one of six teams to fully confirm their interest in staying on board for another season while playing in the BAA. However, despite having lower losses than the Boston Celtics this season, Providence would only continue playing for two more seasons before folding operations in 1949 by the time the BAA merged operations with the older National Basketball League to create the present-day NBA. While the Providence Steamrollers would later try to be revived by the 1970s and 1980s by new ownership, those plans would fail to be materialized entirely for multiple reasons, with the most brazen occurrence happening by 1980.
