= Ken Keller =

American basketball player

Personal information
- Born: August 16, 1922 Brooklyn, New York
- Died: February 24, 1983 (aged 60)
- Listed height: 6 ft 1 in (1.85 m)
- Listed weight: 180 lb (82 kg)

Career information
- High school: Bishop Loughlin (Brooklyn, New York)
- College: Vermont; St. John's (1942–1943)
- Playing career: 1946–1948
- Position: Guard
- Number: 15, 9

Career history
- 1946–1947: Washington Capitols
- 1947: Providence Steamrollers
- 1947–1948: Atlanta Crackers
- 1948: Paterson Crescents
- Stats at NBA.com
- Stats at Basketball Reference

Kenneth W. Keller (August 16, 1922 – February 24, 1983) was an American professional basketball player. At 6 ft 1 in (1.85 m) and 180 pounds (82 kg), he played as a guard for the Washington Capitols and the Providence Steamrollers during the 1946–47 BAA season. He attended the University of Vermont and St. John's University.

== BAA career statistics ==
Legend
GP	Games played	FG%	Field-goal percentage
FT%	Free-throw percentage	APG	Assists per game
PPG	Points per game	**Bold**	Career high

=== Regular season ===
Year	Team	GP	FG%	FT%	APG	PPG
1946–47	Washington	**25**	**.333**	**.500**	.0	**.9**
1946–47	Providence	3	.000	.000	.0	.0
Career		28	.333	.400	.0	.8
