= Bob Hubbard =

American basketball player

Personal information
- Born: December 27, 1922 Westfield, Massachusetts, U.S.
- Died: August 27, 2011 (aged 88) Holyoke, Massachusetts, U.S.
- Listed height: 6 ft 6 in (1.98 m)
- Listed weight: 215 lb (98 kg)

Career information
- High school: West Springfield (Springfield, Massachusetts)
- College: Springfield
- NBA draft: 1947: 2nd round, 14th overall pick
- Drafted by: Providence Steamrollers
- Playing career: 1947–1953
- Position: Center / forward
- Number: 9, 10

Career history
- 1947: Tri-Cities Blackhawks
- 1947–1949: Providence Steamrollers
- 1949: Glens Falls Commodores
- 1949–1950: Hartford Hurricanes
- 1952–1953: Pawtucket Slaters
- Stats at NBA.com
- Stats at Basketball Reference

Robert Cecil Hubbard (December 27, 1922 – August 27, 2011) was an American professional basketball player. Hubbard played in the National Basketball League, Basketball Association of America, New York State Basketball League and American Basketball League in his six-year career. Hubbard played collegiately at Springfield College in Massachusetts and was selected by the Providence Steamrollers in the 1947 BAA draft.

== BAA career statistics ==
Legend
GP	Games played	APG	Assists per game
FG%	Field-goal percentage	PPG	Points per game
FT%	Free-throw percentage	**Bold**	Career high

=== Regular season ===
Year	Team	GP	FG%	FT%	APG	PPG
1947–48	Providence	28	**.291**	**.692**	0.4	**5.4**
1948–49	Providence	**34**	.185	.647	**0.5**	2.1
Career		62	.249	.674	0.5	3.6
