= Ken Sailors =

American basketball player (1921–2016)

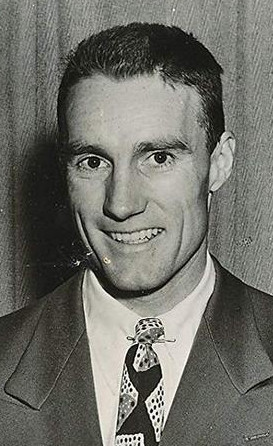
- Sailors, an NBA player with the Baltimore Bullets, in an advertisement for Bennett's Prune Juice, 1950

Personal information
- Born: January 14, 1921 Bushnell, Nebraska, U.S.
- Died: January 30, 2016 (aged 95) Laramie, Wyoming, U.S.
- Listed height: 5 ft 10 in (1.78 m)
- Listed weight: 175 lb (79 kg)

Career information
- High school: Laramie (Laramie, Wyoming)
- College: Wyoming (1940–1943, 1945–1946)
- Playing career: 1946–1951
- Position: Point guard
- Number: 4, 5, 27, 13

Career history
- 1946–1947: Cleveland Rebels
- 1947: Chicago Stags
- 1947: Philadelphia Warriors
- 1947–1949: Providence Steamrollers
- 1949–1950: Denver Nuggets
- 1950: Boston Celtics
- 1950–1951: Baltimore Bullets

Career highlights
- All-BAA Second Team (1949); 2× AAU All-American (1943, 1946); NCAA champion (1943); NCAA Tournament Most Outstanding Player (1943); Consensus first-team All-American (1943); Consensus second-team All-American (1946); No. 4 retired by Wyoming Cowboys
- Stats at NBA.com
- Stats at Basketball Reference
- Collegiate Basketball Hall of Fame

Kenneth Lloyd Sailors (January 14, 1921 – January 30, 2016) was an American professional basketball player and played in the 1940s and early 1950s. A 5 ft 10 in (1.78 m) point guard, he is regarded as being one of the players who developed the jump shot as an alternative to the two-handed, flat-footed set shot. After being named All-American in college basketball for Wyoming in 1942 and 1943, Sailors served in the United States Marine Corps during World War II and returned to play for the Cowboys after the war again winning All-American honors in 1946. Sailors played pro basketball for several teams, then moved to Alaska with his wife and became a high school basketball coach in Glennallen, Alaska north of Valdez.

== Early life ==
Sailors was born January 14, 1921 in Bushnell, Nebraska southwest of Scottsbluff, and grew up on a farm south of Hillsdale, Wyoming. Hillsdale is east of Cheyenne. Sailors developed his effective jump shot while playing on the farm against his 6 ft 4 in (1.93 m) older brother Barton (known as Bud).

== College years ==
Sailors eventually brought his skills to the University of Wyoming in Laramie and he led the Cowboys to the NCAA Men's Basketball Championship in 1943. He was named the NCAA Most Outstanding Player of the tournament for his efforts. He was the unanimous selection as College Basketball Player of the Year in 1943. He was one of several team members who had their sporting careers interrupted by their wartime military service; Sailors enlisted in the U.S. Marines and was promoted to captain by war's end.

Sailors earned All-American honors again after his return to college in 1946. He was the only player in the history of Wyoming Cowboys basketball to be selected as an All-American three times, in 1942, 1943, and 1946.

== Professional career ==
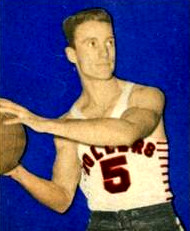
Sailors' Bowmanbasketball card, circa 1948

From 1946 to 1951, Sailors played professionally in the BAA and NBA as a member of the Cleveland Rebels, Chicago Stags, Philadelphia Warriors, Providence Steamrollers, Denver Nuggets, Boston Celtics, and Baltimore Bullets. He was second in the BAA in total assists in 1946–47, was named to the All-BAA 2nd team in 1948–49, and averaged a career high 17.3 points per game in the 1949–50 season. He scored 3,480 points in his professional career.

== Legacy ==
After retirement from pro basketball, in 1951 Sailors chose to move to Glennallen, Alaska where he became a high school teacher and coach. Women's basketball teams at Glennallen High School won three state championships under Sailors's coaching.

Sailors was inducted into the University of Wyoming Athletics Hall of Fame on October 29, 1993. In 2012, he was named to the National Collegiate Basketball Hall of Fame.

John Christgau, author of the book The Origins of the Jump Shot, said that Sailors’ jump shot technique was the one that modern fans would recognize as the "jump shot". In 2014, the University of Wyoming announced its plans to erect a specially-commissioned sculpture of Sailors outside of the university's basketball stadium, the Arena-Auditorium.

Sailors died on January 30, 2016 in Laramie, sixteen days after his 95th birthday, of complications from a heart attack he had in December 2015.

== BAA/NBA career statistics ==
Legend
GP	Games played	FG%	Field-goal percentage
FT%	Free-throw percentage	RPG	Rebounds per game
APG	Assists per game	PPG	Points per game
**Bold**	Career high

=== Regular season ===
Year	Team	GP	FG%	FT%	RPG	APG	PPG
1946–47	Cleveland	**58**	.309	.595	–	2.3	9.9
1947–48	Chicago	1	.000	.000	–	.0	.0
1947–48	Philadelphia	2	**.667**	.000	–	.0	2.0
1947–48	Providence	41	.300	.692	–	1.4	12.7
1948–49	Providence	57	.341	**.766**	–	3.7	15.8
1949–50	Denver	57	.349	.721	–	**4.0**	**17.3**
1950–51	Boston	10	.160	.625	.3	.8	1.8
1950–51	Baltimore	50	.348	.738	**2.3**	2.8	9.5
Career		276	.329	.712	2.0	2.8	12.6

=== Playoffs ===
Year	Team	GP	FG%	FT%	RPG	APG	PPG
1947	Cleveland	2	.375	.750	–	2.0	7.5
Career		2	.375	.750	–	2.0	7.5

== See also ==
- John Miller Cooper
