= George Pastushok =

American basketball player

Personal information
- Born: July 13, 1922 Brooklyn, New York, U.S.
- Died: December 12, 2003 (aged 81) Charlotte, North Carolina, U.S.
- Listed height: 6 ft 1 in (1.85 m)
- Listed weight: 195 lb (88 kg)

Career information
- High school: John Adams (Queens, New York)
- College: St. John's (1942–1943, 1945–1946)
- Playing career: 1946–1947
- Position: Guard
- Number: 5

Career history
- 1946–1947: Providence Steamrollers
- Stats at NBA.com
- Stats at Basketball Reference

George Alexander Pastushok (July 13, 1922 – December 12, 2003) was an American professional basketball player. He spent one season in the Basketball Association of America as a member of the Providence Steam Rollers in 1946–47. He attended St. John's University.

== BAA career statistics ==
Legend
GP	Games played
FG%	Field-goal percentage
FT%	Free-throw percentage
APG	Assists per game
PPG	Points per game

=== Regular season ===
Year	Team	GP	FG%	FT%	APG	PPG
1946–47	Providence	39	.262	.543	.4	3.1
Career		39	.262	.543	.4	3.1
