= George Grimshaw (basketball) =

American basketball player and coach (1919–1974)

Personal information
- Born: September 24, 1919 England
- Died: October 20, 1974 (aged 55) Methuen, Massachusetts
- Listed height: 6 ft 1 in (1.85 m)
- Listed weight: 195 lb (88 kg)

Career information
- High school: Dean Academy (Franklin, Massachusetts)
- College: Brown (1943–1947)
- Playing career: 1946–1947
- Position: Guard
- Number: 14
- Coaching career: 1947–1971

Career history

Playing
- 1946–1947: Providence Steamrollers
- 1948–1949: Hartford Hurricanes

Coaching
- 1947–1950: Puerto Rico
- 1953–1971: Tufts
- Stats at NBA.com
- Stats at Basketball Reference

George W. "Woody" Grimshaw (September 24, 1919 – October 20, 1974) was an American professional basketball player and coach.

Grimshaw played at Brown University in the 1940s, and was the school's first basketball player to score over 1,000 points. He played one season in the Basketball Association of America for the Providence Steamrollers, averaging 2.9 points per game. Though expected to continue playing professional basketball, he stepped on a nail during the summer of 1947 and an anti-tetanus shot left his arm unavailable for use in playing basketball. Grimshaw was approached by the dean of the University of Puerto Rico to become a coach of the basketball team, and Grimshaw coached there from 1947 to 1950. From 1953 to 1971, he coached basketball at Tufts University.

Grimshaw was later inducted into Brown University's Athletic Hall of Fame. The school's Woody Grimshaw Memorial Award is named in his honor. It is presented to the member of the men's basketball team who "[shows] the most positive attitude and the best spirit".

== BAA career statistics ==
Legend
| GP | Games played |
| FG% | Field-goal percentage |
| FT% | Free-throw percentage |
| APG | Assists per game |
| PPG | Points per game |

=== Regular season ===
| Year | Team | GP | FG% | FT% | APG | PPG |
|---|---|---|---|---|---|---|
| 1946–47 | Providence | 21 | .357 | .477 | .0 | 2.9 |
| Career | | 21 | .357 | .477 | .0 | 2.9 |
