= 1948–49 Providence Steamrollers season =

- Head coach: Ken Loeffler
- Owner: Louis Pieri
- Arena: Rhode Island Auditorium

Results
- Record: 12–48 (.200)
- Place: Division: 6th (Eastern)
- Playoff finish: Did not qualify
- Stats at Basketball Reference

The 1948–49 BAA season was the Steamrollers' third and final season in the NBA/BAA. The team would fold after finishing last in the league for a second consecutive season, at 12–48.

== Draft ==
Round	Pick	Player	Position	Nationality	College
1	1	Andy Tonkovich	G	United States	Marshall
–	–	Al Bennett	–	United States	Oklahoma State
–	–	Jack Coleman	F/C	United States	Louisville
–	–	Ed Faber	–	United States	Trinity
–	–	Verl Heap	–	United States	Arizona State
–	–	Otto Snellbacher	–	United States	Kansas
–	–	Brady Walker	F/C	United States	BYU

== Roster ==
1948–49 Providence Steamrollers roster
Players

Pos.	No.	Player	Height	Weight	DOB	From
F	11	Bob Brown	6 ft 4 in (1.93 m)	200 lb (91 kg)	1923-11-12	Miami (OH)
G	3	Ernie Calverley	5 ft 10 in (1.78 m)	145 lb (66 kg)	1924-01-30	Rhode Island
G/F		Johnny Ezersky	6 ft 3 in (1.91 m)	175 lb (79 kg)	1922-03-21	Rhode Island
C	6	Chick Halbert	6 ft 9 in (2.06 m)	225 lb (102 kg)	1919-02-27	West Texas A&M
F/C	10	Bob Hubbard	6 ft 6 in (1.98 m)	215 lb (98 kg)	1922-12-27	Springfield
G/F	11	Carl Meinhold	6 ft 2 in (1.88 m)	185 lb (84 kg)	1926-03-29	Long Island
F/C	6	George Nostrand	6 ft 8 in (2.03 m)	195 lb (88 kg)	1924-01-25	Wyoming
G		Buddy O'Grady	5 ft 11 in (1.80 m)	160 lb (73 kg)	1920-01-19	Georgetown
F		Fred Paine	6 ft 5 in (1.96 m)	210 lb (95 kg)	1925-12-07	Westminster (PA)
F/C	8	Les Pugh	6 ft 7 in (2.01 m)	190 lb (86 kg)	1923-09-18	Ohio State
G/F	5	Mel Riebe	5 ft 11 in (1.80 m)	200 lb (91 kg)	1916-07-12	Wooster
F	12	Lee Robbins	6 ft 3 in (1.91 m)	175 lb (79 kg)	1922-02-11	Colorado
F/C	12	Giff Roux	6 ft 5 in (1.96 m)	195 lb (88 kg)	1923-06-28	Kansas
G	4	Ken Sailors	5 ft 10 in (1.78 m)	175 lb (79 kg)	1921-01-14	Wyoming
F	15	Ben Scharnus	6 ft 2 in (1.88 m)	173 lb (78 kg)	1917-12-11	Seton Hall
G/F	7	Otto Schnellbacher	6 ft 4 in (1.93 m)	185 lb (84 kg)	1923-04-15	Kansas
G/F	5	Earl Shannon	5 ft 11 in (1.80 m)	170 lb (77 kg)	1921-11-23	Rhode Island
G/F	9	Howie Shannon	6 ft 2 in (1.88 m)	175 lb (79 kg)	1923-06-10	Kansas State
G	7	Andy Tonkovich	6 ft 1 in (1.85 m)	185 lb (84 kg)	1922-11-01	Marshall
PF	16	Brady Walker	6 ft 6 in (1.98 m)	205 lb (93 kg)	1921-03-15	BYU

Coaches
Head coach

Ken Loeffler

Legend
- (DP) Unsigned draft pick
- (FA) Free agent
- (S) Suspended
- Injured

Roster

== Regular season ==
=== Season standings ===
#	Eastern Division				
#	Team	W	L	PCT	GB
1	x-Washington Capitols	38	22	.633	–
2	x-New York Knicks	32	28	.533	6
3	x-Baltimore Bullets	29	31	.483	9
4	x-Philadelphia Warriors	28	32	.467	10
5	Boston Celtics	25	35	.417	13
6	Providence Steamrollers	12	48	.200	26

=== Game log ===
#	Date	Opponent	Score	High points	Record
1	November 4	Washington	95–99 (3OT)	Pugh, Sailors (17)	0–1
2	November 6	Philadelphia	56–69	Carl Meinhold (10)	0–2
3	November 9	@ Philadelphia	84–92	Ken Sailors (16)	0–3
4	November 11	Fort Wayne	90–87	Ken Sailors (26)	1–3
5	November 13	Minneapolis	67–90	Ken Sailors (25)	1–4
6	November 18	Rochester	74–103	Howie Shannon (11)	1–5
7	November 20	Indianapolis	107–110	Ken Sailors (24)	1–6
8	November 24	@ Minneapolis	89–117	Ken Sailors (17)	1–7
9	November 25	@ St. Louis	82–84	Howie Shannon (19)	1–8
10	November 27	Baltimore	71–91	Howie Shannon (17)	1–9
11	November 30	New York	61–88	Ernie Calverley (14)	1–10
12	December 1	@ Washington	63–75	Ezersky, Nostrand (13)	1–11
13	December 2	Washington	61–66	Ken Sailors (24)	1–12
14	December 4	Boston	63–70	Howie Shannon (18)	1–13
15	December 7	@ Rochester	90–89	Ken Sailors (20)	2–13
16	December 8	@ New York	74–83 (OT)	Howie Shannon (21)	2–14
17	December 9	New York	63–74	Howie Shannon (15)	2–15
18	December 16	Fort Wayne	61–76	Calverley, Sailors, H. Shannon (14)	2–16
19	December 18	Philadelphia	90–94	Brady Walker (20)	2–17
20	December 22	@ Washington	77–102	Brady Walker (17)	2–18
21	December 23	St. Louis	99–109	Ken Sailors (27)	2–19
22	December 25	Baltimore	83–88	Howie Shannon (16)	2–20
23	December 29	@ Baltimore	98–88	Otto Schnellbacher (18)	3–20
24	December 30	Chicago	89–101	Brady Walker (16)	3–21
25	December 31	@ Boston	67–69	Ken Sailors (19)	3–22
26	January 1	Indianapolis	77–78	Howie Shannon (15)	3–23
27	January 4	Chicago	104–115	Ken Sailors (27)	3–24
28	January 6	Chicago	78–89	Howie Shannon (25)	3–25
29	January 8	Boston	87–69	Brady Walker (19)	4–25
30	January 11	@ Indianapolis	67–90	Carl Meinhold (13)	4–26
31	January 12	@ Minneapolis	64–98	Carl Meinhold (11)	4–27
32	January 15	@ St. Louis	76–79	George Nostrand (16)	4–28
33	January 16	@ Fort Wayne	56–76	Ken Sailors (10)	4–29
34	January 18	@ Philadelphia	74–86	Chick Halbert (19)	4–30
35	January 20	Washington	81–88	Chick Halbert (22)	4–31
36	January 22	Baltimore	89–86	Ken Sailors (24)	5–31
37	January 25	@ Boston	69–54	Howie Shannon (14)	6–31
38	January 26	@ New York	77–89	Ken Sailors (26)	6–32
39	January 27	@ Baltimore	95–89	Chick Halbert (24)	7–32
40	January 29	Boston	91–85 (OT)	Ernie Calverley (21)	8–32
41	February 1	@ Philadelphia	86–93	Ken Sailors (23)	8–33
42	February 3	Rochester	88–80	Ernie Calverley (22)	9–33
43	February 5	Chicago	75–91	Ken Sailors (25)	9–34
44	February 8	@ Rochester	65–97	Mel Riebe (15)	9–35
45	February 11	@ Boston	77–94	Ken Sailors (25)	9–36
46	February 12	Indianapolis	91–78	Howie Shannon (27)	10–36
47	February 17	@ Baltimore	102–100	Ken Sailors (37)	11–36
48	February 19	Minneapolis	80–94	Ken Sailors (20)	11–37
49	February 23	@ Washington	88–100	Ken Sailors (24)	11–38
50	February 24	New York	89–84	Les Pugh (22)	12–38
51	February 26	St. Louis	90–93	Halbert, Pugh (19)	12–39
52	March 3	@ New York	65–86	Ken Sailors (16)	12–40
53	March 5	@ Rochester	64–81	Chick Halbert (19)	12–41
54	March 6	@ Minneapolis	59–68	Brady Walker (16)	12–42
55	March 8	@ Chicago	82–110	Les Pugh (16)	12–43
56	March 9	@ Fort Wayne	80–84	Ken Sailors (17)	12–44
57	March 12	Philadelphia	70–92	Les Pugh (23)	12–45
58	March 15	@ Indianapolis	84–90	Les Pugh (20)	12–46
59	March 16	@ St. Louis	59–81	Les Pugh (12)	12–47
60	March 17	vs Fort Wayne	72–74	Ernie Calverley (17)	12–48

== Awards and records ==
- Ken Sailors, All-NBA Second Team

== Dispersal Draft ==
Originally, the Providence Steamrollers planned on continuing to play for another season like every other Basketball Association of America team had done at the time, as noted by the 1949 BAA draft showcasing the Steamrollers participating in the event, with them notably selecting Howie Shannon from Kansas State University as the official #1 pick of the final BAA draft ever done before it officially got rebranded as the NBA draft (even though he already played for them during this final season the Steamrollers would ever play in, the Steamrollers joined the Boston Celtics and New York Knicks as teams that would give up a draft pick in the 1949 BAA draft in order to get rookies to play during this final BAA season of play), as well as acquiring Carl Shaeffer from the University of Alabama, Ed Leede from Dartmouth College, Warren Perkins from Tulane University, Ray Corley from Georgetown University, Paul Courty from the University of Oklahoma, Bill Tanzler from the University of Florida, Bob Royer from Indiana State University, and Jack Theolan from DePaul University as the last selections they'd ever have in the third and final BAA draft that they would ever participate in. However, after the Basketball Association of America (BAA) and National Basketball League (NBL) officially merged together to become the National Basketball Association (NBA) on August 3, 1949, the newly formed NBA would purchase up the players from both of the BAA's defunct teams (the Indianapolis Jets and Providence Steamrollers) as a means of buying out both of the BAA's teams that didn't make it to the new merger into the NBA. For the Steamrollers' case, seven of their players would be bought out and sign up for the Boston Celtics in what would officially be considered the first ever NBA season, with Ernie Calverley, Ken Goodwin, Chick Halbert, Ed Leede, Les Pugh, Howie Shannon, and Brady Walker all being received by the Boston Celtics nine days later on August 12, 1949. Not only that, but Warren Perkins was slated to have been traded to the Tri-Cities Blackhawks and Bob Royer was slated to have been traded to the original Denver Nuggets NBL turned NBA team before the start of what can be considered the first proper NBA season.
