= Johnny Ezersky =

American basketball player (1922–2012)

Personal information
- Born: March 21, 1922 New York City, New York, U.S.
- Died: February 20, 2012 (aged 89)
- Listed height: 6 ft 3 in (1.91 m)
- Listed weight: 175 lb (79 kg)

Career information
- High school: Power Memorial (New York City, New York)
- BAA draft: 1947: – round, –
- Drafted by: Boston Celtics
- Playing career: 1946–1952
- Position: Forward / guard
- Number: 10, 8, 6, 20, 16

Career history
- 1946–1947: Brooklyn Gothams
- 1947: Tri-Cities Blackhawks
- 1947–1948: Providence Steamrollers
- 1948–1949: Baltimore Bullets
- 1949: Boston Celtics
- 1949–1950: Baltimore Bullets
- 1950: Hartford Hurricanes
- 1950–1951: Wilkes-Barre Barons
- 1951–1952: Scranton Miners

Career BAA and NBA statistics
- Points: 1,031 (7.6 ppg)
- Assists: 169 (1.3 apg)
- Stats at NBA.com
- Stats at Basketball Reference

John Joseph Ezersky (March 21, 1922 – February 20, 2012) was an American professional basketball player. A basketball star at Power Memorial Academy in the late 1930s, Ezersky was accused of accepting money in his senior year and was subsequently ruled ineligible for college basketball. Though Ezersky is listed as having played for the University of Rhode Island team, he never played basketball at a college level.

Ezersky attempted a career in baseball following his college basketball ruling and tried out for the Detroit Tigers alongside close friend Buddy Kerr in 1941, but he was sent to the minor leagues and failed to make it out of spring training. He returned to New York, where he became a cab driver and was later drafted into the military for World War II. He was discharged from service in 1946, and resumed his cab driving before attempting to pursue a career in professional basketball. He signed with the Brooklyn Gothams of the American Basketball League, but only managed to play two games for the team. The following season, he signed with the Tri-Cities Blackhawks of the National Basketball League, and played with the team for two months. Ezersky spent the next two seasons in the Basketball Association of America and, later, the National Basketball Association, playing with the Baltimore Bullets in two stints and the Boston Celtics in one, with the latter team having previously drafted him in the 1947 BAA draft. He was not resigned by either team following the 1949–50 NBA season, so he spent his final two seasons playing basketball in the ABL for a second time with the Hartford Hurricanes and Wilkes-Barre Barons, and in the Eastern Professional Basketball League with the Scranton Miners.

After retiring from playing professional basketball in 1952, Ezersky returned to his career as a cab driver in New York City. He moved to East Bay, California in 1981, where he resumed his cab driving career until he retired in 2000, aged seventy-eight. Ezersky was a member of the group of NBA veterans that lobbied against the NBA's pension rules, which previously required pre-1965 players to have played in the NBA or BAA for five years to be eligible. The requirement was changed to three years and made Ezersky, who spent three years in the two leagues, able to receive the pension.

== BAA/NBA career statistics ==
Legend
GP	Games played	APG	Assists per game
FG%	Field-goal percentage	PPG	Points per game
FT%	Free-throw percentage	**Bold**	Career high

=== Regular season ===
Year	Team	GP	FG%	FT%	APG	PPG
1947–48	Providence	25	.253	.606	0.6	10.1
1948–49	Providence	11	.219	**.840**	1.0	4.8
1948–49	Baltimore	27	.295	.709	1.0	4.7
1948–49	Boston	18	**.368**	.613	1.6	**10.3**
1949–50	Baltimore	**38**	.305	.697	**1.7**	8.1
1949–50	Boston	16	.265	.686	1.4	6.7
Career		135	.288	.669	1.3	7.6
