= Fred Paine =

American basketball player

Personal information
- Born: December 7, 1925 Stockdale, Pennsylvania, U.S.
- Died: October 26, 2004 (aged 78) Jupiter, Florida, U.S.
- Listed height: 6 ft 5 in (1.96 m)
- Listed weight: 210 lb (95 kg)

Career information
- College: Westminster (Pennsylvania) (1943–1947)
- BAA draft: 1947: undrafted
- Playing career: 1948–1949
- Position: Forward

Career history
- 1948–1949: Providence Steamrollers
- Stats at NBA.com
- Stats at Basketball Reference

Frederick Vincent Paine Jr. (December 7, 1925 – October 26, 2004) was an American professional basketball player. He spent one season in the Basketball Association of America (BAA) as a member of the Providence Steamrollers (1948–49). He attended Westminster College of Pennsylvania.

== BAA career statistics ==
Legend
GP	Games played
FG%	Field-goal percentage
FT%	Free-throw percentage
APG	Assists per game
PPG	Points per game

=== Regular season ===
Year	Team	GP	FG%	FT%	APG	PPG
1948–49	Providence	3	.158	.200	.3	2.3
Career		3	.158	.200	.3	2.3
