= Brady Walker =

American basketball player

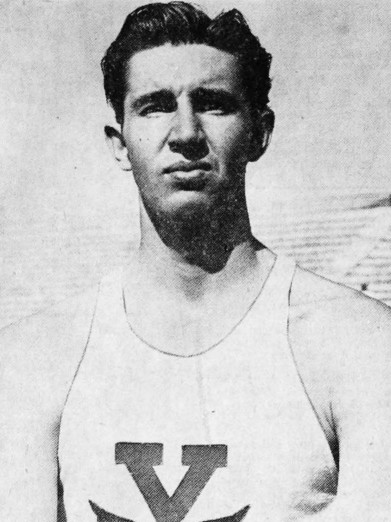

Personal information
- Born: March 15, 1921 Provo, Utah, U.S.
- Died: November 30, 2007 (aged 86)
- Listed height: 6 ft 6 in (1.98 m)
- Listed weight: 205 lb (93 kg)

Career information
- College: BYU (1941–1943, 1945–1947)
- NBA draft: 1948: – round, –
- Drafted by: Providence Steamrollers
- Playing career: 1948–1952
- Position: Power forward / center
- Number: 16, 13, 7

Career history
- 1948–1949: Providence Steamrollers
- 1949–1950: Boston Celtics
- 1950–1952: Baltimore Bullets

Career BAA/NBA statistics
- Points: 1,603 (7.0 ppg)
- Rebounds: 549 (5.4 rpg)
- Assists: 328 (1.4 apg)
- Stats at NBA.com
- Stats at Basketball Reference

Brady W. Walker (March 15, 1921 – November 30, 2007) was an American professional basketball player. Walker was selected in the 1948 BAA Draft by the Providence Steamrollers after a collegiate career at Brigham Young. He played for the Steamrollers, Boston Celtics, and Baltimore Bullets in his four-year BAA/NBA career.

== BAA/NBA career statistics ==
Legend
GP	Games played	MPG	Minutes per game
FG%	Field-goal percentage	FT%	Free-throw percentage
RPG	Rebounds per game	APG	Assists per game
PPG	Points per game	**Bold**	Career high

=== Regular season ===
Year	Team	GP	MPG	FG%	FT%	RPG	APG	PPG
1948–49	Providence	59	–	.363	.561	–	1.2	**8.3**
1949–50	Boston	**68**	–	.374	.632	–	1.6	7.5
1950–51	Boston	17	–	.394	.556	1.8	0.5	1.8
1950–51	Baltimore	49	–	.394	.713	**6.6**	**2.1**	7.5
1951–52	Baltimore	35	20.0	**.410**	**.765**	5.6	1.1	5.8
Career		228	20.0	.380	.633	5.4	1.4	7.0
