= Ernie Calverley =

American basketball player and coach (1924–2003)

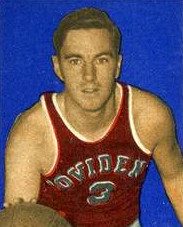
- Calverley in 1948

Personal information
- Born: January 30, 1924 Pawtucket, Rhode Island, U.S.
- Died: October 20, 2003 (aged 79) Providence, Rhode Island, U.S.
- Listed height: 5 ft 10 in (1.78 m)
- Listed weight: 145 lb (66 kg)

Career information
- High school: Pawtucket (Pawtucket, Rhode Island)
- College: Rhode Island (1943–1946)
- Playing career: 1946–1949
- Position: Point guard
- Number: 3
- Coaching career: 1957–1968

Career history

Playing
- 1946–1949: Providence Steamrollers

Coaching
- 1957–1968: Rhode Island

Career highlights
- All-BAA Second Team (1947); BAA assists leader (1947); Second-team All-American – Argosy (1945); Second-team All-American – Helms (1946); 2× Third-team All-American – Converse (1945, 1946); Third-team All-American – TSN (1944); NCAA scoring champion (1944)

Career NBA statistics
- Points: 1,961 (11.9 ppg)
- Assists: 572 (3.5 apg)
- Games: 165
- Stats at NBA.com
- Stats at Basketball Reference

Ernest Albert Calverley (January 30, 1924 – October 20, 2003) was an American professional basketball player. He was an All-American while playing for the University of Rhode Island. He played professionally with the Providence Steamrollers of the Basketball Association of America for three seasons from 1946 to 1949. Calverley led the league in assists and was an All-BAA Second Team selection in his first season in the league.

== College career ==
Calverley was retroactively declared the men's basketball season scoring leader for 1944. But Calverley was most notable for one particular shot. Dubbed the "shot heard round the world", it was a midcourt shot from 62 feet away, as time expired at Madison Square Garden in the 1946 National Invitation Tournament against Bowling Green to tie the game and send it to overtime. Even after 50 years, he stated that he didn't think it was going to go in, as he had to make sure it did not hit the scoreboard while shooting with both hands. Rhode Island State (now known as the University of Rhode Island) would win 82–79 in overtime to send them to the semifinal round. The Rams would eventually lose in the NIT final against Adolph Rupp's Kentucky Wildcats by one point. Soon after, Calverley would join the BAA.

== Professional career ==
Calverley led in assists per game in the league's first and second years, while playing for his home state team, the Providence Steamrollers. In his rookie season, Calverley was selected to the All-BAA Second Team. In his career, he missed only three games (one for each season). He had a 70.7% free throw percentage, which contrasted with his 29.1% lifetime field goal percentage. He was drafted by the Boston Celtics from the Providence Steamrollers in the dispersal draft in 1949 after the team disbanded. A month later, he was put on waivers, and he never played again.

== Later life ==
He later returned to URI to coach the Rams and led them to two NCAA Division I men's basketball tournament appearances in 1961 and 1966, losing both times in the first round. Calverely died of complications of an infection after insertion of a pacemaker on October 20, 2003.

== BAA career statistics ==
Legend
GP	Games played	GS	Games started	MPG	Minutes per game
FG%	Field goal percentage	3P%	3-point field goal percentage	FT%	Free throw percentage
RPG	Rebounds per game	APG	Assists per game	SPG	Steals per game
BPG	Blocks per game	PPG	Points per game	**Bold**	Career high
*	Led the league

=== Regular season ===
Year	Team	GP	FG%	FT%	APG	PPG
1946–47	Providence	**59**	.293	.703	3.4*	**14.3**
1947–48	Providence	47	.271	.665	2.5	11.9
1948–49	Providence	**59**	**.313**	**.756**	**4.3**	9.4
Career		165	.291	.707	3.5	11.9
