= Robert Morris (basketball) =

American basketball coach (1902–1986)

Robert Bruce Morris
Personal information
- Born: November 3, 1902 Taylor, Pennsylvania, U.S.
- Died: November 1986 Norristown, Pennsylvania, U.S.

Career history

Coaching
- 1946–1947: Providence Steamrollers
- 1947–1954: Brown

Career highlights
- East Stroudsburg University Hall of Fame (1987)

Robert Bruce Morris (November 3, 1902 – November 1986) was an American basketball head coach as well as former collegiate athlete. He served as the head coach for the Providence Steamrollers, a Basketball Association of America team, in 1946–47. Morris then guided Brown University's men's basketball team from 1947 to 1954. He accumulated a 28–32 record with Providence and overall 61–87 record with Brown. While at Brown, one of his players was future College Football Hall of Fame coach Joe Paterno, who earned two varsity letters.

As an athlete, Morris lettered in football, baseball, and track at East Stroudsburg University of Pennsylvania. He was a member of a Penn Relays-winning track team and was later inducted into the school's athletic hall of fame in 1987. Upon the conclusion of his coaching career he became a schoolteacher and high school coach at Pawtucket High School in Pawtucket, Rhode Island.

== Head coaching record ==
=== Professional ===
Legend
Regular season	G	Games coached	W	Games won	L	Games lost	W–L %	Win–loss %
Playoffs	PG	Playoff games	PW	Playoff wins	PL	Playoff losses	PW–L %	Playoff win–loss %

Team	Year	G	W	L	W–L%	Finish	PG	PW	PL	PW–L%	Result
PRO	1946–47	60	28	32	.466	4th in Eastern	0	0	0	.000	Missed Playoffs
Career		60	28	32	.466		0	0	0	.000	

=== College ===
Record table
Season	Team	Overall	Conference	Standing	Postseason
Brown Bears (Independent) (1947–1953)
1947–48	Brown	6–14			
1948–49	Brown	13–8			
1949–50	Brown	11–14			
1950–51	Brown	8–11			
1951–52	Brown	5–15			
1952–53	Brown	4–14			
Brown Bears (EIBL) (1953–1954)
1953–54	Brown	13–11	4–10	7th	
Total:		61–87 (.412)			
National champion Postseason invitational champion Conference regular season champion Conference regular season and conference tournament champion Division regular season champion Division regular season and conference tournament champion Conference tournament champion
