= Howie Shannon =

American basketball player

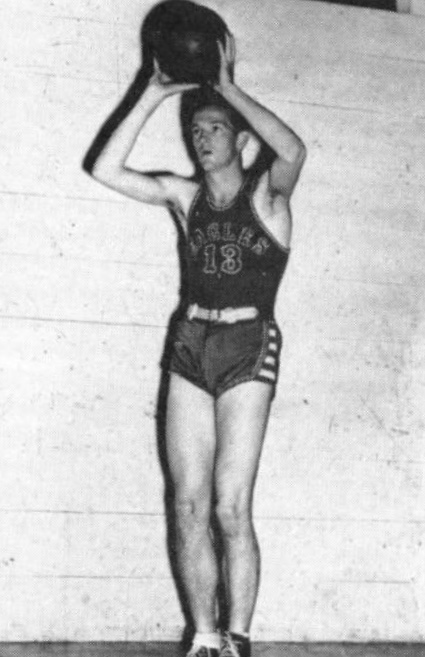
- Shannon from the 1943 “Yukka”

Personal information
- Born: June 10, 1923 Manhattan, Kansas, U.S.
- Died: August 16, 1995 (aged 72) Plano, Texas, U.S.
- Listed height: 6 ft 2 in (1.88 m)
- Listed weight: 175 lb (79 kg)

Career information
- High school: Munday (Munday, Texas)
- College: North Texas (1942–1943); Kansas State (1947–1948)
- BAA draft: 1949: 1st round, 1st overall pick
- Drafted by: Providence Steamrollers
- Playing career: 1948–1950
- Position: Shooting guard / small forward
- Number: 9, 8
- Coaching career: 1950–1971

Career history

Playing
- 1948–1949: Providence Steamrollers
- 1949–1950: Boston Celtics

Coaching
- 1950–1954: Topeka HS
- 1954–1964: Kansas State (assistant)
- 1964–1971: Virginia Tech

Career highlights
- Second-team All-American – Helms (1948)

Career statistics
- Points: 1,323 (10.8 ppg)
- Assists: 299 (2.5 apg)
- Games played: 122
- Stats at NBA.com
- Stats at Basketball Reference

Howard Payne Shannon (June 10, 1923 – August 16, 1995) was an American basketball player and coach. He played professionally in the Basketball Association of America (BAA) and the early years of the National Basketball Association (NBA). He later coached at the high school and college levels.

Shannon played college basketball for the North Texas Green and Kansas State Wildcats. After the 1947–48 season with Kansas State, he was ruled ineligible to play by the Big Seven after the conference re-interpreted a rule to count freshman and junior college play against a player's four-year limit of college play. Consequently, Shannon signed a one-year contract to play professionally with the Providence Steamrollers of the BAA. He averaged 13.4 points per game in 1948–49 and was named the league's Rookie of the Year, a designation not currently recognized by the NBA for that season. Although he had already signed and played with Providence, the team was still required to select him in the 1949 BAA draft to secure his rights. He was selected with the first overall pick of the draft. However, the Steamrollers would fold their organization before the start of the first season with the NBA name. As a result, his rights were picked up by the Boston Celtics for the 1949-50 NBA season.

Following his playing career, Shannon became head coach at Topeka High School in Kansas, where he coached from 1950 to 1954 before becoming an assistant to Tex Winter at Kansas State. In 1964, Shannon was named head coach of Virginia Tech. Shannon coached the Hokies to a 104–67 record and its best NCAA Tournament finish in 1967, reaching the Mideast Regional final before falling to Dayton. In 1971, Shannon resigned to join Virginia Tech's physical education faculty full-time. Shannon was also coach of the 1960 Puerto Rican basketball team in the 1960 Olympics.

Howie Shannon died of lung cancer on August 16, 1995, in Plano, Texas.

== BAA/NBA career statistics ==
Legend
GP	Games played	FG%	Field-goal percentage
FT%	Free-throw percentage	APG	Assists per game
PPG	Points per game	**Bold**	Career high

=== Regular season ===
Year	Team	GP	FG%	FT%	APG	PPG
1948–49	Providence	55	**.364**	**.804**	2.3	**13.4**
1949–50	Boston	**67**	.344	.786	**2.6**	8.8
Career		122	.355	.795	2.5	10.8
