= Pawtucket Slaters (basketball) =

The Pawtucket Slaters were an American basketball team based in Pawtucket, Rhode Island that was a member of the American Basketball League.

== Year-by-year ==
Year	League	Reg. season	Playoffs
1952/53	ABL	5th	Did not qualify
