= Stonington Borough School =

- Stonington High School
- U.S. National Register of Historic Places
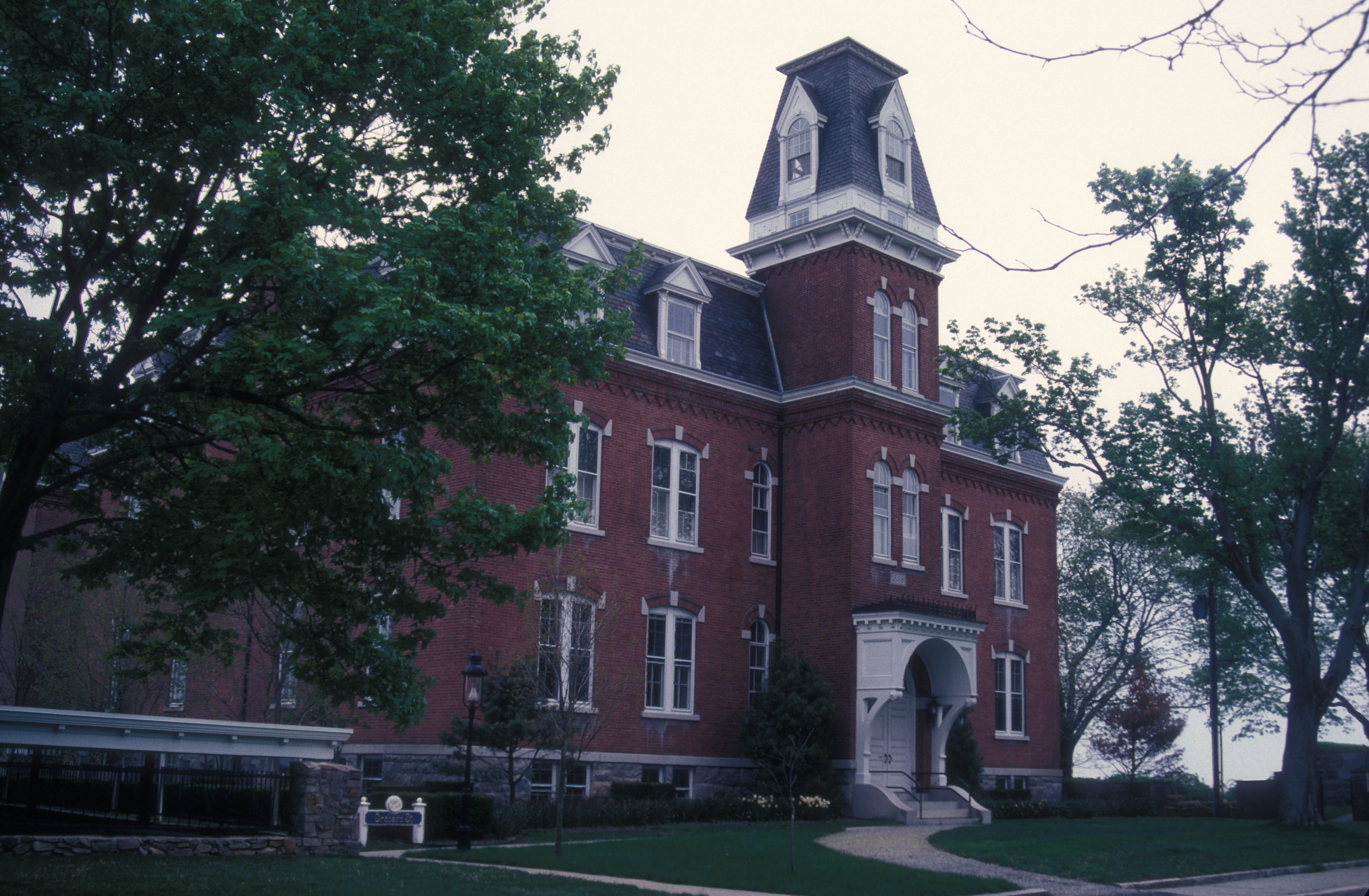

- Location within Connecticut Location within the United States
- Location: 176 South Broad Street, Pawcatuck, Connecticut
- Coordinates: 41°20′3″N 71°54′12″W
- Area: 1 acre (0.40 ha)
- Built: 1888
- Architect: Brayton, Atwood W.; Lamb, Lorenzo H.
- Architectural style: Second Empire
- NRHP reference No.: 78002880
- Added to NRHP: August 17, 1978

The Borough School, also known as Stonington High School from 1910 to 1939, is a condominium building at 25 Orchard Street in Stonington, Connecticut. It was built in 1888 and is a distinct and high quality local example of Second Empire architecture. The building was listed on the National Register of Historic Places in 1978 and was converted to residential use in 1981. This building is not to be confused with the town's modern high school, Stonington High School, in Pawcatuck.

== Description and History ==
The school is located on the east side of Stonington borough, its backside overlooking Little Narragansett Bay east of the commercial center of the village. It is a three-story Second Empire brick structure with a mansard roof and a four-story tower above its entrance. The tower is also topped by a mansard roof with iron resting at the top. The main roof is pierced by dormers with pedimented gables and the tower's roof faces are pierced by dormers with round arch windows. Windows are set in pairs in fragmented arch openings or singly in round arch openings with stone keystones and lintel end stones. The interior is framed in wood.

The school was built in 1888, and originally served as a community school for the village, housing all grade levels. It was doubled in size in 1903, with a near duplicate of the original construction placed to the rear and joined to it via a connecting hall and stairwell. A new high school was built on Field Street in Pawcatuck in 1939, at which time this school was reduced to use as a grammar school. It was closed due to fire on March 13, 1973.

== See also ==
- National Register of Historic Places listings in New London County, Connecticut
