= 1947–48 BAA season =

Second NBA season

- League: Basketball Association of America
- Sport: Basketball
- Duration: November 12, 1947 – March 21, 1948; March 23–25, 1948 (Play-in tournaments); March 23 – April 8, 1948 (Playoffs); April 10–21, 1948 (Finals)
- Games: 48
- Teams: 8

Draft
- Top draft pick: Clifton McNeely
- Picked by: Pittsburgh Ironmen

Regular season
- Top seed: St. Louis Bombers
- Top scorer: Max Zaslofsky (Chicago)

Playoffs
- Eastern champions: Philadelphia Warriors (Note: The 1948 BAA Playoffs did not generate Eastern and Western champions and runners-up, as NBA Playoffs have done from 1951 to present. Eastern and Western leaders, or perhaps champions, Philadelphia and St. Louis played off to determine one finalist while four runners-up played off to determine the other finalist. The listed teams were BAA playoff finalists and semifinalists, as Eastern and Western champions and runners-up in the NBA have been playoff finalists and semifinalists from 1951 to present.) (Note: Philadelphia may reasonably be called Eastern champion.)
- Eastern runners-up: St. Louis Bombers (Note: St. Louis may reasonably be called runners-up for the Eastern Division championship in the case of this season.)
- Western champions: Baltimore Bullets (Note: Baltimore may reasonably be called Western champions despite not having the best record in the Western Division this season.)
- Western runners-up: Chicago Stags

Finals
- Champions: Baltimore Bullets
- Runners-up: Philadelphia Warriors

BAA/NBA seasons
- ← 1946–47 1948–49 →

The 1947–48 BAA season was the second season of the Basketball Association of America. The 1948 BAA Playoffs ended with the Baltimore Bullets winning the BAA championship, beating the Philadelphia Warriors in 6 games in the BAA Finals.

Although not celebrated at the time, this season was historic, with Wataru Misaka of the New York Knicks becoming the first person of color to play in modern professional basketball.

The NBA recognizes the three BAA seasons as part of its own history so the 1947–48 BAA season is considered the second NBA season.

== Notable occurrences ==
- Following the departure of the Cleveland Rebels, Detroit Falcons, Pittsburgh Ironmen, and Toronto Huskies alongside the addition of the Baltimore Bullets from the original American Basketball League, the Western Division would see the Washington Capitols move into the Western Division alongside the Baltimore Bullets in order to adjust to the smaller number of teams for this season.
- For the majority of this season, the BAA would have an agreement with the older, rivaling National Basketball League to have the NBL play 24 of their games as opening matches before the Chicago Stags played their home games for this season, which was done in order for the BAA to try to have better negotiation talks with the NBL to help out both of their futures at the time. However, one unintended side effect to these games saw four of the NBL's own teams (the Fort Wayne Zollner Pistons, the Indianapolis Kautskys, the new NBL champion Minneapolis Lakers, and the runner-up Rochester Royals) defecting from the NBL into the BAA following this season's conclusion, with two more NBL teams in the Oshkosh All-Stars and Toledo Jeeps trying and failing to join them also. This led to the end of any attempts for a second season where the two leagues hosted a doubleheader series of sorts together.
- With the Baltimore Bullets defeating the defending BAA champion Philadelphia Warriors, this would mark the first time in BAA/NBA history that the league champion would come from a team that originated from a different professional basketball league at the time (in this case, the original American Basketball League). Not only that, but as of 2026, this Bullets franchise would become the only championship team to later become officially defunct from the league later on its in history.

Coaching changes
Offseason
Team	1946–47 coach	1947–48 coach
New York Knicks	Neil Cohalan	Joe Lapchick
Providence Steamrollers	Robert Morris	Albert Soar
In-season
Team	Outgoing coach	Incoming coach
Providence Steamrollers	Albert Soar	Nat Hickey

== Preseason events ==
Cleveland, Detroit, Pittsburgh and Toronto folded before the season started, leaving the BAA with only seven teams. (All cities except Pittsburgh would get new NBA teams in future years.) To make up for at least the loss of the Cleveland Rebels and Detroit Falcons early on into their season, however, the BAA allowed for the entry of the Baltimore Bullets from the older American Basketball League to provide a more convenient number of ten teams by the inaugural 1947 BAA draft before later being downgraded to only eight teams entering this season. Not only that, but the BAA decreased the number of games played this season from 60-61 to 48 (their lowest total number of games in a non-lockout season) in order to compensate for the lost teams this season.

== Final standings ==
#	Eastern Division				
#	Team	W	L	PCT	GB
1	x-Philadelphia Warriors	27	21	.563	–
2	x-New York Knicks	26	22	.542	1
3	x-Boston Celtics	20	28	.417	7
4	Providence Steamrollers	6	42	.125	21

#	Western Division				
#	Team	W	L	PCT	GB
1	x-St. Louis Bombers	29	19	.604	–
2	x-Baltimore Bullets	28	20	.583	1
3	x-Chicago Stags	28	20	.583	1
4	x-Washington Capitols	28	20	.583	1

== Playoffs ==
There were no byes. Western and Eastern champions St. Louis and Philadelphia immediately played a long semifinal series with St. Louis having home-court advantage. Philadelphia won the seventh game in St. Louis, 85–46, two days before Baltimore concluded its sequence of tie-breaker (not shown) and two short series with other runners-up.

First Round
W2	Baltimore	2
E2	New York	1
E3	Boston	1
W3	Chicago	2

BAA Semifinals
W1	St. Louis*	3
E1	Philadelphia*	4
W2	Baltimore	2
W3	Chicago	0

BAA Finals
E1	Philadelphia*	2
W2	Baltimore	4

- * Division winner
- Bold Series winner

== Statistics leaders ==
Category	Player	Team	Stat
Points	Max Zaslofsky	Chicago Stags	1,007
Assists	Howie Dallmar	Philadelphia Warriors	120
FG%	Bob Feerick	Washington Capitols	.340
FT%	Bob Feerick	Washington Capitols	.788

Note: Prior to the 1969–70 season, league leaders in points and assists were determined by totals rather than averages.

== BAA awards ==
- All-BAA First Team
  - C Ed Sadowski, Boston Celtics
  - F Joe Fulks, Philadelphia Warriors
  - F Howie Dallmar, Philadelphia Warriors
  - F Bob Feerick, Washington Capitols
  - G Max Zaslofsky, Chicago Stags
- All-BAA Second Team
  - G Buddy Jeannette, Baltimore Bullets
  - C Stan Miasek, Chicago Stags
  - G Carl Braun, New York Knicks
  - G Fred Scolari, Washington Capitols
  - G John Logan, St. Louis Bombers
- BAA Rookie of the Year
  - F/G Paul Hoffman, Baltimore Bullets

== See also ==
- List of NBA regular season records
- 1947–48 NBL season, the rivaling season of what would eventually be their merging partner to form the National Basketball Association in the older National Basketball League within the U.S.A. from 1937 until 1949
