= Providence Steamrollers =

Defunct American basketball team

- Division: Eastern
- Founded: 1946; 80 years ago
- Folded: 1949; 77 years ago
- History: Providence Steamrollers; 1946–1949
- Arena: Rhode Island Auditorium
- Location: Providence, Rhode Island
- Team colors: Burgundy, pink, black
- General manager: Joe Fay
- Ownership: Louis Pieri

The Providence Steamrollers were a Basketball Association of America team based in Providence, Rhode Island. As of October 2026, the Steamrollers were the last professional sports franchise from one of the Big Four leagues to be based in Rhode Island.

== Franchise history ==
The Steamrollers were one of the original eleven NBA franchises (when the league was called the Basketball Association of America). The franchise posted an all-time record of 46–122 (.274) before folding after three seasons.

The Steamrollers still hold the dubious NBA record for the fewest games won in a season with six, in the 1947–48 season, paired with 42 losses. However, the 2011–2012 Charlotte Bobcats hold the record for the lowest winning percentage in NBA history, with .106, the result of a 7–59 record. During that 1947–48 season, the Steamrollers' coach Nat Hickey activated himself as a player for two games, the second of which was two days before his 46th birthday, setting a still-standing record as the oldest player in NBA history.

On August 3, 1949, the Steamrollers would join the Indianapolis Jets as the only teams from the Basketball Association of America side of the BAA-NBL merger in what's now known as the NBA to not join in on the merger and survive as a team. Nine days later, seven of the Steamrollers' players would be bought out and play for the Boston Celtics instead.

== Christmas Tradition ==
The Steamrollers took on the New York Knicks on Christmas Day in 1947 in the first Christmas Day game in NBA history. The Steamrollers lost the game to the Knicks 89–75 in what would become an annual tradition for the NBA.

== Attempts to bring the Steamrollers back ==
In 1980, entrepreneur Robert "Skip" Chernov attempted to bring the Steamrollers back to the NBA, following an earlier revival effort in 1978 and prior to another attempt in 1984. Chernov had purchased the rights to the Steamrollers from Lou Pieri's estate and believed that the NBA bylaws at the time would allow him to resurrect the franchise. The NBA led by Chief Counsel David Stern disagreed, but Chernov, undeterred, sued the NBA. Chernov asked the courts to allow the Steamrollers return to the NBA and to grant them the first overall pick in the 1980 NBA draft. Ultimately, the court ruled in the NBA's favor and the short-lived attempt to resurrect the Providence Steamrollers failed.

== Players of note ==
- Ernie Calverley – Second-team All-NBA and led league in assists during NBA's first season
- George Nostrand – Tallest player in the NBA's first year
- Howie Shannon – Leading NBA rookie in 1949
- Nat Hickey – Oldest player in NBA history
- Kenny Sailors – Led team in scoring in 1948 and 1949

=== Naismith Basketball Hall of Fame ===
Providence Steamrollers Hall of Famers
Coaches
Name	Position	Tenure	Inducted
Ken Loeffler	Head coach	1948–1949	1964

== Draft ==
Player name	College	Year
Howie Shannon	Kansas State University	1949
Ed Leede	Dartmouth College	1949
Warren Perkins	Tulane University	1949
Ray Corley	Georgetown University	1949
Bob Royer	Indiana State University	1949
Paul Courtey	University of Oklahoma	1949
Carl Schaeffer	University of Alabama	1949
Bill Tanzler	University of Florida	1949
Jack Theolan	DePaul University	1949
Andy Tonkovich	Marshall University	1948
Al Bennett	Oklahoma State University	1948
Jack Coleman	University of Louisville	1948
Ed Faber	Trinity University	1948
Verl Heap	Arizona State University	1948
Otto Schnellbacher	University of Kansas	1948
Brady Walker	Brigham Young University	1948
Walt Dropo	University of Connecticut	1947
Joe Barry		1947
Dick Furey	University of St. Thomas	1947
Bob Hubbard	Springfield College	1947
Bob Joyce	Bates College	1947
Roy Lipscomb	St. Mary's College of Maryland	1947
John Mills	Hofstra University	1947
Al Nicolas	University of Rhode Island	1947

== Coaches and others ==
- Robert Morris (1946–47)
- Hank Soar (1947–48)
- Nat Hickey (1948)
- Ken Loeffler (1948–49)

== Season-by-season record ==
BAA champions	Division champions	Playoff berth

Season	League	Division	Finish	Wins	Losses	Win%	GB	Playoffs	Awards
1946–47	BAA	Eastern	4th	28	32	.467	21	—	—
1947–48	BAA	Eastern	4th	6	42	.125	21	—	—
1948–49	BAA	Eastern	6th	12	48	.200	26	—	—
Regular season record				46	122	.274	1946–1949		
Playoff record				0	0	–			
