= 1938–39 Troy Haymakers season =

- League: American Basketball League (revived original)
- Head coach: Carl Husta (player-coach; 7–13); Marty Friedman (5–8)
- General manager: Ed Connors & Marty Connors(?)
- Owner(s): Ed Connors & Marty Connors
- Arena: Troy State Armory

Results
- Record: 12–21 (.364)
- Place: Conference: 6th
- Playoff finish: Did not qualify

The 1938–39 Troy Haymakers season was unofficially considered the eighth professional basketball season ever held by the team that was known as the Original Celtics, as well as the first season ever held by the team known as the Troy Haymakers (as they were known at the time), as well as their only full season ever played under that name. It could also potentially be seen as (at least) the 24th season of independent play as well for the overall history of the Original Celtics franchise, though it can reasonably be considered (at least) their 23rd season properly due to the New York Hakoahs briefly replacing the Original Celtics entirely during the original era of the American Basketball League before it got revived in 1933 as a regional league instead of an entirely national league as the ABL had originally envisioned itself to be at the time, with it being arguable that the Troy Haymakers' only full season could not truly count as an Original Celtics season properly. In any case, following the previous season's conclusion, singer Kate Smith and talent manager Ted Collins would end up selling off their ownership shares of the team to brothers Ed & Marty Connors, with the Connors brothers moving the team from New York City to nearby Troy, New York and rebranded the franchise from the Celtics to the Haymakers for (most of) this season. This season would also be the first season in the franchise's now very mixed up and messy history in the since revived ABL (second overall season if you include the 1927–28 season for the Original Celtics within the original rendition of the ABL of its time specifically) where the ABL itself wouldn't operate in a split season format, but instead operated in a regular season format similar to what the newly-rivaling National Basketball League would utilize within its own season of play. Unfortunately for Troy, the Haymakers would spend their only full season of play under the Haymakers name with a below-average 12–21 record (with one of their losses including a lucky break from the Jersey Reds, who had an older player named Chuck Huntington show up at the literal last minute for a lucky break on their ends due to all but four of the team's own players getting into a car accident in a December 1938 match, with Jersey not being willing to forfeit from such an unlucky incident), finishing their season outside of the ABL's playoff picture for this season that had the Troy franchise finish ahead of only the Brooklyn Visitations for what would become their final season of play and the newly-created Washington Heurichs franchise that was a work-branded franchise from the local Christian Heurich Brewing Company. The season officially ended with the #4 New York Jewels upsetting their way into an ABL championship, getting the championship over the #2 seeded Philadelphia Sphas in the semifinal round and the defending champion Jersey Reds (a #3 seeded team who upset the #1 seeded Kingston Colonials) in the championship round, though their season technically wouldn't end with their failed season in the ABL.

Near the end of March in 1939, the Troy Haymakers would decide to rebrand themselves from the Haymakers back into the Celtics name they had (officially being labeled as the Troy Celtics during that brief period of time, though they would be seen as competing as the Original Celtics in the process) when competing in the newly created World Professional Basketball Tournament in Chicago, with the Troy franchise originally being intended to be joined alongside the Philadelphia Sphas as the only ABL teams competing in the inaugural version of that event before the Sphas ultimately dropped out of the competition at the last minute due to them having too many injuries to deal with (which led to the Sphas being replaced by the Illinois Grads, a local team based on college graduate students coming from Champaign, Illinois). However, Troy would not be on their lonesome for this event since the former ABL team known as the New York Yankees (sometimes referred to as the Bronx Yankees in the event instead) would end up joining in for (sort of) ABL representation in that tournament. Due to the awkward formatting of the inaugural tournament's set-up, three teams from this tournament would be given a first round bye, while one team was given a bye in the quarterfinal round. For the Haymakers turned Celtics franchise, they would be one of the lucky three teams to get a first round bye alongside the Chicago Harmons and the all-black New York Renaissance. However, Troy would end up losing their only official match played in the quarterfinal round when they lost in the quarterfinal round to the rivaling NBL's Sheboygan Red Skins through a 36–29 final score. This brief period of time would be the main point where the connection of the Troy Haymakers to the Original Celtics franchise would be kept in mind, if only under a brief, incongruous moment in time. Following the conclusion of the inaugural WPBT event held, the Troy franchise would officially return to their initial Haymakers for at least the start of the 1939–40 season before a later merger with the Kingston Colonials would see them bring back the Celtics name to become the Troy Celtics for the rest of that season going forward in time there.

== Roster ==
Due to information on American Basketball League players being generally hard to find, there are bound to be more gaps and/or inaccuracies found in certain areas on the team's roster spots than usual.

1938–39 Troy Haymakers roster
Players

Pos.	No.	Player	Height	Weight	DOB	From
G/F		Jules Bender	5 ft 11 in (1.80 m)	160 lb (73 kg)	1914-04-02	Long Island
F		Cy Boardman	6 ft 2 in (1.88 m)	185 lb (84 kg)	1915-08-24	NYU
G/F		Jim Brown	6 ft 3 in (1.91 m)	205 lb (93 kg)	1912-06-13	Temple
G/F		Moe Dubilier	6 ft 2 in (1.88 m)	210 lb (95 kg)	1915-02-20	John Marshall University
G		Harry Fitzpatrick	5 ft 9 in (1.75 m)	170 lb (77 kg)	1913-05-22	No college
F/C		Tom Flanagan	6 ft 1 in (1.85 m)	165 lb (75 kg)	1916-07-18	No college
G/F		Moe Frankel	5 ft 10 in (1.78 m)	190 lb (86 kg)	1913-01-25	No college
G/F		Carl Husta	5 ft 11 in (1.80 m)	175 lb (79 kg)	1902-04-08	No college
C		Al Kellett	6 ft 3 in (1.91 m)	210 lb (95 kg)	1901-10-30	Columbia
F		Ben Kramer	6 ft 1 in (1.85 m)	195 lb (88 kg)	1913-05-03	Long Island
F/C		Al Lenowicz	5 ft 11 in (1.80 m)	215 lb (98 kg)	1914-09-25	St. Francis College
G		Tommy McDonald	5 ft 8 in (1.73 m)	155 lb (70 kg)	1914-02-06	Niagara
C		Milt Perkel	6 ft 3 in (1.91 m)	210 lb (95 kg)	1901-10-30	Columbia
G		Joe Polcha	5 ft 11 in (1.80 m)	170 lb (77 kg)	1917-02-24	No college
G/F		Mac Posnack	5 ft 11 in (1.80 m)	195 lb (88 kg)	1909-06-23	St. John's
G/F		Jack Prendergast	6 ft 2 in (1.88 m)	190 lb (86 kg)	1912-02-24	No college
F		Frank Silvanic	6 ft 1 in (1.85 m)	180 lb (82 kg)	1917-12-13	No college
G/F		Corky Stanton	6 ft 0 in (1.83 m)	180 lb (82 kg)	1914-02-21	Union College
C		Pete Sudyk	6 ft 4 in (1.93 m)		1914-04-19	No college
G		Sammy Van Hook	5 ft 10 in (1.78 m)	190 lb (86 kg)	1916-06-29	Saint Joseph's
G		Nat Volpe	5 ft 8 in (1.73 m)	155 lb (70 kg)	1916-05-15	Manhattan

Coaches
Head coach

Carl Husta
Marty Friedman

Legend
- (DP) Unsigned draft pick
- (FA) Free agent
- (S) Suspended
- Injured

The roster would also be (completely) different from the brief time they would spend while competing in the inaugural 1939 World Professional Basketball Tournament.

== American Basketball League Standings ==
Pos.	League Standings	Wins	Losses	Win %
1	Kingston Colonials	28	7	.800
2	Philadelphia SPHAs	24	9	.727
3	Jersey Reds	19	14	.576
4	New York Jewels	19	15	.559
5	Wilkes-Barre Barons	14	22	.389
6	Troy Haymakers	12	21	.364
7	Brooklyn Visitations	7	20	.259
8	Washington Heurichs	7	22	.241

The top four teams would later compete in a playoff format this season, with the best team competing against the third-best team and the second-best team competing against the fourth-best team through a best-of-three series in the semifinal round before the winning two teams from each round would go up against each other in a best-of-three championship series.

== World Professional Basketball Tournament ==
For the first time ever, the World Professional Basketball Tournament, an annual basketball tournament held in Chicago, would begin operations in what would be an annual event for a decade-long process (lasting nearly as long as the rest of the rivaling National Basketball League's own lifespan). With the first ever tournament held for this event, only the ABL's own Troy Haymakers (who decided to rebrand themselves as the Troy Celtics just for this event as a sort of tribute to honor the Original Celtics franchise that the Haymakers would later become, hence the sort of connection between the Haymakers and Celtics franchises for this season) would participate in the inaugural 1939 event that was held on March 26–28, 1939 and was mostly held by independently ran teams alongside both the Oshkosh All-Stars and their in-state rivals in the Sheboygan Red Skins, who both represented the rivaling National Basketball League. (Originally, the Philadelphia Sphas team that was also from the American Basketball League was intended to join the Troy Haymakers turned Troy Celtics as the only other ABL team to join the WPBT as well, but due to them being too injured to participate, they were replaced with the Illinois Grads team involving college graduate students that played basketball in nearby Champagne, Illinois. Not only that, but the former ABL team known as the New York Yankees also participated in the WPBT themselves (albeit sometimes being referred to as the Bronx Yankees in order to not be confused with the more famous New York Yankees MLB team), which marked the only time ABL affiliated teams had a sort of equal footing in the WPBT as the rivaling NBL did.) Due to the odd number of teams participating in this event this year (eleven total teams, likely due to the ABL's Philadelphia Sphas being replaced with the Illinois Grads), the WPBT were forced to implement a unique system of sorts where three teams were given a bye in the first round and one team was given a bye in the quarterfinal round only. In this case, Troy would be one of the three teams given a first round bye alongside the Chicago Harmons (who were actually the former ABL team and future NBL team known as the Chicago Bruins under a different name for this event) and the Hall of Fame worthy all-black New York Renaissance, meaning those three teams would be forced to compete in the quarterfinal round soon afterward (which saw the rivaling NBL's Oshkosh All-Stars get the quarterfinal round after they won their first round match over the Clarksburg Oil team). When the Troy Celtics franchise finally had their first opponent in the WPBT, they would go up against the rivaling NBL's Sheboygan Red Skins, who had previously won their first round match against the aforementioned Illinois Grads replacement team. Unfortunately for the Haymakers turned Celtics, this would end up becoming the only match that the Troy squad would end up playing in this tournament, as they would end up losing 36–29 to the Sheboygan squad in the quarterfinal match they had following their first round bye. While Sheboygan would end up having a fourth place finish in the WPBT following losses to their in-state rivals in the Oshkosh All-Stars (who had a second place finish behind the all-black New York Renaissance following their wins over the Yankees (who won their first round match over the Brenton Harbor House of David) and the world-famous Harlem Globetrotters) and the all-black Harlem Globetrotters (who previously defeated the Chicago Harmons before going to their third place consolation prize match-up against Sheboygan), the Troy Celtics would never again compete in the WPBT following their sole appearance in the inaugural event.

=== Game Played ===
- The Troy Celtics had a bye in the first round.
- Lost quarterfinal round (29–36) to the Sheboygan Red Skins.
