= 1922–23 Original Celtics season =

- League: Metropolitan Basketball League
- Head coach: Johnny Whitty
- General manager: Jim Furey & Johnny Whitty
- Owner(s): Jim Furey & Thomas Furey
- Arena: Madison Square Garden

Results
- Record: 12–0 (1.000)
- Place: Conference: 1st (1st half)
- Playoff finish: Left league on November 17, 1922 before the second half of the season began. (The Elizabeth Club would later gain the Original Celtics' first place spot (unofficially).)

1922–23 Atlantic City Sandpipers / Original Celtics season
- League: Eastern Basketball League
- Head coach: Marvin Riley (Atlantic City Sandpipers; 0–3); Doc Newman (Atlantic City Sandpipers; 2–6); Nat Holman (Original Celtics; 5–1)
- General manager: Thomas Hughes & Marvin Riley (Atlantic City Sandpipers (& Atlantic City Celtics?)); Jim Furey & Johnny Whitty (Original Celtics)
- Owner(s): Thomas Hughes & Marvin Riley (Atlantic City Sandpipers); Jim Furey & Thomas Furey via The Nonpareil Club of Brooklyn (Original Celtics)
- Arena: Steel Pier (Atlantic City Sandpipers / Original Celtics)

Results
- Record: 7–10 (.412)
- Place: Conference: 4th (1st half)
- Playoff finish: Left league in December (23?), 1922 before the second half of the season began. (EBL folded operations on January 5 (or 19), 1923.)

The 1922–23 Original Celtics season was the second professional basketball season ever held by the team that was known as the Original Celtics officially. However, this season would also (potentially) be considered the ninth season of independent play as well for the Celtics. After previously winning the Eastern Basketball League's championship, the Original Celtics decided to leave the EBL to instead play in the Metropolitan Basketball League (at least early on at the time) going forward for that season. However, after the Original Celtics had a perfect 12–0 record to start out the first half of the season and essentially feeling like they were already confirmed to be the champions of the Metropolitan Basketball League if they continued playing there (at least during the first half of the season), they ended up leaving the Metropolitan Basketball League (which would only be in its second season of existence by this point in time with controversial inaugural champions due to the Brooklyn Dodgers technically being crowned champions of that season by default over the New York MacDowell Lyceum due to the latter team going on a player's strike) on November 17, 1922 (just one week before the first half of the season was set to conclude) in order to later return to the Eastern Basketball League for the second (and final) season they could do so under a different name (and location) in the process there. Unlike the previous season in the Eastern Basketball League, where the Original Celtics were playing as their own selves after previously taking over for both the Harrisburg Club and the New York Giants franchises in the first half of the season, the Original Celtics would end up moving out to Atlantic City, New Jersey to become the "Atlantic City Celtics" in the games they played there instead of their official Original Celtics name. Similar to their first season in the Eastern Basketball League (which had existed since 1909, outside of one season due to a combination of World War I and the Spanish flu pandemic,) the Celtics would have to enter the first half of the season holding the record of the original team they were playing for (in this case, the Atlantic City Sandpipers) for the rest of that half of the season before later trying to compete in the second half of the split season format with a clean slate on their ends. However, after the "Atlantic City" Celtics ended up going 5–1 (.833) in the games they played in the Eastern Basketball League (only losing to the Trenton Tigers 29–23 on December 6, 1922), the Celtics would end up defecting from the EBL as well after a game they had previously scheduled against the Philadelphia Jaspers / Jewels on December 22 was postponed due to the Celtics taking a special Western road trip of games on their end, which related to the EBL forcing an ultimatum on the Celtics' ends on accepting a weekly salary of $400 per week instead of the previously agreed upon $900 per week. The declined ultimatum would later lead to not just the Atlantic City Sandpipers / Celtics defecting from the EBL by the end of the first half of the season (finishing their season with a combined 7–10 record between the games played by the Sandpipers and the Celtics, with the Original Celtics having a 5–1 record in Atlantic City and the Sandpipers going 2–9 under their own tenure) alongside the Reading Bears / Pretzels, but it would also lead to the EBL officially defaulting operations entirely, with its season officially ending on January 5, 1923 (though it would also be stated that they ended up quietly ending their season early and prematurely on January 19, 1923 instead).

Following the ugly way things ended up going for the Original Celtics during their second and final season in the EBL (as well as the only season they played in the MBL with the perfect record that they had there), the Original Celtics would leave Atlantic City entirely and go back to their original home in New York for the rest of the season, with their games played starting on New Year's Day essentially being a long barnstorming tour that would have them travel throughout three different states and 114 different cities in the process. This season would especially be notable for their barnstorming efforts throughout the entire season, as when they included the twelve straight games played (and won) within the Metropolitan Basketball League and the six games they played in the since-defunct Eastern Basketball League that had them finishing their time spent in that league with a 5–1 record for that season in the games they officially played there (even while playing as the "Atlantic City Celtics" instead of their proper Original Celtics name at the time), the Original Celtics franchise would end up finishing the 205 total games played that season (which officially began on September 1922 and ended on April 1923) with an insurmountable-looking overall record of 193–11–1 (.940, though it's currently not known what game was tied nor the circumstances for how and why it became a recorded tied game in the first place (though it's suggested that Celtics owner Jim Furey would attempt to play teams to a tie and then extract teams to pay more cash (i.e., having the promoter of the match pay more cash to the Celtics) to try and play games for extra minutes in something like an overtime period in order to determine the official winner of a match)), including the 17–1 record (.944) they had within the two professional basketball leagues they played in. Interestingly, the Original Celtics felt like they had one more team to go up against in order for them to officially consider themselves the "world champions" of basketball for the season, with the team they were most interested in competing against that season being against the Franklin Wonder Five, a high school basketball team from Franklin High School representing the state of Indiana. Despite their best efforts to compete against the Franklin Wonder Five, however, the Original Celtics were ultimately declined the challenge against Franklin to determine who the best basketball team from this season truly was between them both due to Franklin's roster being "too tired" to compete against them after a grueling season of their own that they had to deal with during that same period of time, with Franklin's head coach trying to give them the offer again for next season instead. With that being said, despite not having an official final match to determine who they thought was basketball's ultimate champion for the season (as well as there being two teams that had previously beaten the Celtics this season also considering themselves the official champions for the sport of basketball this season due to the Eastern Basketball League's Trenton Tigers (sometimes referred to as the Trenton (Royal) Bengals) beating the Celtics during the one loss they had in the EBL that season with a 29–23 road loss on December 6, 1922 and the Metropolitan Basketball League's Paterson Legionnaires (sometimes referred to as the Kingston/Paterson Legionnaires instead due to them also playing in Kingston, New York as the Kingston Legionnaires within the New York State Basketball League) winning three out of five games played against the Celtics (including a doubleheader series that they had before getting a 24–19 final score on April 6, 1923) before the Legionnaires later won league championships in both the local New York State League and the bigger MBL), the Original Celtics during this season would still hold what can be described as the greatest overall record in basketball, if not sporting history throughout an entire season of play (at least in terms of overall scope).

Following this season's conclusion, the Celtics would remain an independent team until the 1926–27 season, where they would compete in the "original" National Basketball League as the Original Celtics before competing in the American Basketball League under the Brooklyn Celtics name, with them also sometimes being referred to as the Brooklyn Arcadians / Celtics (if only in an unofficial manner) for at least the first half of the ABL's second season of existence.

== Original Celtics Roster ==
Due to information on older professional basketball leagues being generally hard (if not outright impossible these days) to find for players from leagues like the Eastern Basketball League and the Metropolitan Basketball League, there are bound to be more gaps and/or inaccuracies found in certain areas on the team's roster spots than usual.

1922–23 Original Celtics roster
Players

Pos.	No.	Player	Height	Weight	DOB	From
G/F		Pete Barry	5 ft 11 in (1.80 m)	170 lb (77 kg)	1896-11-16	No college
G/F		John Beckman	5 ft 9 in (1.75 m)	160 lb (73 kg)	1895-10-26	St. Gabriel's Catholic School (NY)
G/F		Eddie Burke	5 ft 9 in (1.75 m)	160 lb (73 kg)	1894-09-03	Boys HS (NY)
G/F		Dutch Dehnert	6 ft 0 in (1.83 m)	185 lb (84 kg)	1898-04-05	No college
C		Horse Haggerty	6 ft 4 in (1.93 m)	235 lb (107 kg)	1891-07-04	No college
G/F		Nat Holman	5 ft 11 in (1.80 m)	170 lb (77 kg)	1896-10-19	Savage School of Physical Education
F/C		Chris Leonard	6 ft 3 in (1.91 m)	190 lb (86 kg)	1890-02-10	Manhattan
G/F		Johnny Whitty	5 ft 9 in (1.75 m)	175 lb (79 kg)	1896-02-02	No college

Coaches
Head coach

Johnny Whitty

Legend
- (DP) Unsigned draft pick
- (FA) Free agent
- (S) Suspended
- Injured

=== Atlantic City Sandpipers Roster ===
Due to information on older professional basketball leagues being generally hard (if not outright impossible these days) to find for players from leagues like the Eastern Basketball League in the case of the Atlantic City Sandpipers specifically (and the Metropolitan Basketball League in the case of the Original Celtics as well), there are bound to be more gaps and/or inaccuracies found in certain areas on the team's roster spots than usual. However, from what was gathered in "The Originals: The New York Celtics Invent Modern Basketball", the original players from the Atlantic City Sandpipers that first represented their team before the Original Celtics took over for a brief period of time were originally players that were a part of the Wilkes-Barre Barons from the previous season before they became the Atlantic City Sandpipers to start out this season instead. As such, the listing of players from this roster would ultimately be a separate listing from that of the Original Celtics' roster, outside of some potential overlapping between the Atlantic City Sandpipers' roster and the Original Celtics' roster in this case, in a way that's somewhat similar to that of what can be considered the merged operations both the Harrisburg Club and New York Giants from the previous season in the Eastern Basketball League.

Player	Position
John "Pete" Barry*	G/F
John Beckman*	G/F
Frank Bruggy	G/F
Ray Cross	F/C
George "Horse" Haggerty*	C
Quack Harvey	G/F
Nat Holman*	G/F
Jack Lawrence	F/C
Chris Leonard*	F/C
Joe Mangold	G/F
Ally McWilliams	G/F
Stretch Miller	C
Doc Newman	G/F
Obie Oberholzer	G/F
Herman "Chickie" Passon	G/F
Emil Rosenast	G/F
Charlie Tettemer	G/F
Eddie White	G/F
Johnny Whitty*	G

* – Played for the team while representing the Atlantic City Celtics name.

== Team Standings ==
=== Metropolitan Basketball League Standings ===
First Half
Team	Wins	Losses	Winning %
Original Celtics	12	0	1.000
Elizabeth Club	9	3	.750
Greenpoint Knights of St. Anthony	7	5	.583
Brooklyn Visitations	8	6	.571
Brooklyn Pros	4	7	.364
Paterson Legionnaires	4	8	.333
New York MacDowell Lyceum	5	10	.333
Brooklyn Dodgers	2	12	.143

The Original Celtics dropped out of the Metropolitan Basketball League after the first half of the season concluded since they felt they were too strong to compete in that league for the rest of the season. As such, the Elizabeth Club was considered the official champions of the first half of the season following the Celtics' departure, with the Yonkers Chippewas replacing the Original Celtics for the second half of the season.

Second Half
Team	Wins	Losses	Winning %
Paterson Legionnaires	18	10	.643
Brooklyn Pros	18	10	.643
Greenpoint Knights of St. Anthony	16	12	.571
Yonkers Chippewas	15	13	.536
Brooklyn Visitations	14	13	.519
Elizabeth Club	9	14	.391
Brooklyn Dodgers	10	16	.385
New York MacDowell Lyceum	7	19	.269

The Paterson Legionnaires would end up winning the second half tiebreaker series for the Metropolitan Basketball League's season 2–1 over the Brooklyn Pros, with Paterson later winning the league's championship 3–1 over the Elizabeth Club. Despite the official standing of the MBL as a professional basketball league, however, the Original Celtics were more seen as either the official champions of the sport of basketball (once again) this season or close to that mark due to the similarly competitive nature of the Franklin Wonder Five high school team by comparison due to the overall record that team had, including the perfect record held in the MBL and the near-perfect record held while playing in the EBL, though the Legionnaires would make a decent case on being the overall champions for the sport due to them previously beating the Original Celtics in three out of five matches played (even if they were competing under their alternative name of the Kingston Legionnaires at the time when they were in the New York State Basketball League instead of the Paterson Legionnaires name within the MBL).

=== Eastern Basketball League Standings ===
First Half
Team	Wins	Losses	Winning %
Trenton Tigers	16	3	.842
Camden Skeeters	16	4	.800
Coatesville Coats	9	11	.450
Atlantic City Sandpipers / Celtics	7	10	.412
Philadelphia Jaspers / Jewels	5	13	.278
Reading Bears / Pretzels	3	15	.167

The first half of the season would end with the Reading Pretzels and the Atlantic City Sandpipers / Celtics leaving the Eastern Basketball League due to financial and competitive issues involving the EBL this season.

Second Half
Team	Wins	Losses	Winning %
Trenton Tigers	2	1	.667
Camden Skeeters	2	1	.667
Coatesville Coats	2	2	.500
Philadelphia Jaspars / Jewels	0	2	.000

The Eastern Basketball League would officially cease operations on January 5, 1923 (though they would considerably be quiet about shutting down operations until January 19, 1923 instead). It can be assumed that the Trenton Tigers would be deemed the unofficial champions of the Eastern Basketball League for this season had it continued onward. (Interestingly enough, the Trenton Tigers could also see themselves as the official basketball champions (in a sense) as well due to them previously beating the Original Celtics in the one Eastern Basketball League match they had against the Celtics this season.)" after the sentence saying "It can be assumed that the Trenton Tigers would be deemed the unofficial champions of the Eastern Basketball League for this season had it continued onward.
