= 1937–38 New York Celtics season =

Professional basketball season

- League: American Basketball League (revived original)
- Head coach: John "Pete" Barry
- General manager: Ted Collins(?)
- Owner(s): Kate Smith & Ted Collins
- Arena: New York Hippodrome

Results
- Record: 18–21 (.462)
- Place: Conference: 5th (both 1st and 2nd halves)
- Playoff finish: Did not qualify

The 1937–38 New York (Original) Celtics season was (unofficially) considered the seventh professional basketball season ever held by the team that was known as the Original Celtics officially, as well as the Celtics' only full season played in the revived version of the American Basketball League under the New York (Original) Celtics name. It could also potentially be seen as (at least) the 23rd season of independent play as well for the Celtics, though it can reasonably be considered (at least) their 22nd season properly due to the New York Hakoahs briefly replacing the Original Celtics entirely during the original era of the American Basketball League before it got revived in 1933 as a regional league instead of an entirely national league as the ABL had originally envisioned itself to be at the time. After previously folding operations back in the 1929–30 season and having Max Rosenblum try to revive the Original Celtics under his own moniker of the "Max Rosenblum Celtics", franchise co-owner Kate Smith (best known for her singing prowess) and her talent manager, Ted Collins, would end up taking over the Celtics franchise from Max Rosenblum and have the Original Celtics come back to both New York City and the ABL (now under its revived formatting) for only the second half of the previous season, the New York Celtics (sometimes branded as the New York Kate Smith Celtics in some outlets due to how some sporting outlets referred to the franchise as that instead of just the New York Celtics alone or even the New York Original Celtics due to Kate Smith being the primary owner of the team) would enter this season trying to bring back the reputation of the Original Celtics franchise for the 1930s after they previously left the original ABL due primarily to financial issues that somewhat stemmed from the Great Depression. The ABL also entered the (first half of the) season with seven teams competing in the league before another New York operated team in the basketball version of the New York Yankees ended up leaving the ABL by the time the second half of the season began. Unfortunately for the Celtics, they would end up becoming one of the poorer teams of the entire ABL by comparison to what the Original Celtics would have done in their previous history.

Throughout the entire season, the New York Celtics would have ended up essentially getting an overall 5th place with a combined below-average 18–21 finish in the ABL. However, the first half of the season would at least see them get an above-average winning record of 11–10 record to still end up with a fifth place finish for that half of the season ahead of the only two losing teams in the ABL for that half of the season in the Kingston Colonials and the New York Yankees (the latter of whom ended up leaving the league following their poor 1–11 start to the season), but still being behind the defending ABL champion Philadelphia Sphas, the Brooklyn Visitations, the New Haven turned New York Jewels, and the first half champions of the season in the Jersey Reds. While the Celtics would try and bounce back from the bad fifth place result from the first half of the season, they would end up concluding the second half of the season with an even worse 7–11 record for a fifth place finish there, resulting in them only having a worse second half record behind the Brooklyn Visitations with their poor 2–15 record for that half of the season despite having talented players like Jerry Bush and Chick Reiser being on the team throughout this season, with the New York Jewels being the champions of the second half of the season; the ABL's season would ultimately end with the Jersey Reds defeating the New York Jewels for the championship series. Following the season's conclusion, Celtics owners Kate Smith and Ted Collins would end up selling off their franchise's ownership rights to brothers Ed & Marty Connors, who would end up moving the franchise away from their original home venue in New York City and into the nearby city of Troy instead. Not only that, but both Ed and Marty would end up renaming the franchise from the Celtics to the Troy Haymakers for the upcoming ABL season (though they would later rename the franchise into the Troy Celtics for the soon to be newly implemented World Professional Basketball Tournament that would be held in the following year afterward during that same season in question, with them having people think the Original Celtics franchise were revived once again just to participate in that tournament in question).

== Roster ==
Due to information on American Basketball League players being generally hard to find, there are bound to be more gaps and/or inaccuracies found in certain areas on the team's roster spots than usual.

1937–38 New York (Original) Celtics roster
Players

Pos.	No.	Player	Height	Weight	DOB	From
G/F		Jules Bender	5 ft 11 in (1.80 m)	160 lb (73 kg)	1914-04-02	Long Island
G/F		Pete Berenson	5 ft 10 in (1.78 m)	180 lb (82 kg)	1912-10-16	CCNY
F/C		Jerry Bush	6 ft 3 in (1.91 m)	200 lb (91 kg)	1914-09-06	St. John's
G		Harry Fitzpatrick	5 ft 9 in (1.75 m)	170 lb (77 kg)	1913-05-22	No college
C		Bernie Fliegel	6 ft 3 in (1.91 m)	195 lb (88 kg)	1913-05-13	CCNY
G		Nat Frankel	5 ft 8 in (1.73 m)	150 lb (68 kg)	1909-10-19	Brooklyn College
G		Carl Johnson	5 ft 8 in (1.73 m)	150 lb (68 kg)	1909-10-19	William L. Dickinson HS (NJ)
G/F		Samuel Kaplan	5 ft 10 in (1.78 m)	160 lb (73 kg)	1913-05-22	CCNY
C		Al Kellett	6 ft 3 in (1.91 m)	210 lb (95 kg)	1901-10-30	Columbia
F		Ben Kramer	6 ft 1 in (1.85 m)	195 lb (88 kg)	1913-05-03	Long Island
F/C		Jack McGuirk	6 ft 3 in (1.91 m)	170 lb (77 kg)	1915-11-08	Manhattan
F		Bill Nash	6 ft 2 in (1.88 m)		1913-01-13	Columbia
G/F		Chick Reiser	5 ft 11 in (1.80 m)	165 lb (75 kg)	1914-12-17	Pratt Institute

Coaches
Head coach

John "Pete" Barry

Legend
- (DP) Unsigned draft pick
- (FA) Free agent
- (S) Suspended
- Injured

== American Basketball League Standings ==
First Half
Team	Wins	Losses	Winning %
Jersey Reds	16	6	.727
New Haven Jewels / New York Jewels^{[a]}	12	8	.600
Brooklyn Visitations	13	10	.565
Philadelphia SPHAs	12	10	.545
New York (Original) Celtics	11	10	.524
Kingston Colonials	5	15	.250
New York Yankees^{[b]}	1	11	.083

Second Half
Team	Wins	Losses	Winning %
New York Jewels^{[a]}	14	5	.737
Jersey Reds	13	7	.650
Philadelphia SPHAs	11	9	.550
Kingston Colonials	9	9	.500
New York (Original) Celtics	7	11	.389
Brooklyn Visitations	2	15	.118

== Notes ==
^{a} Before the season began, the Brooklyn Jewels moved from Brooklyn, New York to New Haven, Connecticut to become the New Haven Jewels to start out the season. However, on November 30, 1937, the team moved back from New Haven to Brooklyn to once again return to their original New York Jewels name for the rest of the season.
^{b} The New York Yankees basketball team would drop out of the ABL on January 11, 1938 during the first half of the season.
