= 1921–22 Original Celtics season =

1921–22 Harrisburg Club / New York Giants / Original Celtics season
- League champions
- League: Eastern Basketball League
- Head coach: Harry Hough (Harrisburg Club; 0–3); Gordon Ford (Harrisburg Club; 1–5); Charles Brickley (New York Giants; 0–8); Johnny Whitty (Original Celtics; 20–4)
- General manager: Harry Hough & Gordon Ford? (Harrisburg Club); Charles Brickley (New York Giants); Jim Furey & Johnny Whitty (Original Celtics)
- Owner(s): Harry Hough & Gordon Ford? (Harrisburg Club); Tex Rickard & Charles Brickley (New York Giants); Jim Furey & Thomas Furey via The Nonpareil Club of Brooklyn (Original Celtics)
- Arena: Chestnut Street Auditorium (Harrisburg Club); Madison Square Garden (New York Giants(?) / Original Celtics)

Results
- Record: 21–20 (.512)
- Place: Conference: 8th (1st half for the Harrisburg Club/New York Giants/Original Celtics); 1st (2nd half for the Original Celtics)
- Playoff finish: Original Celtics won EBL Championship 2–1 over the Trenton Royal Bengals

The 1921–22 Original Celtics season was the first professional basketball season ever held by the team that was known as the Original Celtics officially. Originally, the Celtics were not playing this season as a professional basketball team (with this season (potentially) being their eighth season of independent play at first), with the Eastern Basketball League (which had existed since 1909 and continued existing at the time outside of one season where they could not compete due to a combination of World War I and the Spanish flu pandemic at the same time) originally first having both the Harrisburg Club and the New York Giants (with the latter team originally operating as the New York Whirlwinds by Tex Rickard that had competed against the Original Celtics to inconclusively determine the (unofficial) national champions of the 1920–21 basketball season) operating within the EBL at the time officially in an eight-team league that also included the Philadelphia Phillies and the Scranton Miners as teams there (with the Celtics being forbidden to compete against the EBL's teams in exhibition matches due to the Eastern Basketball League designating the Celtics' players onto some of the EBL's teams (such as John Beckman being a part of the Scranton Miners, Dutch Dehnert and Chris Leonard being a part of the Wilkes-Barre Barons, and Nat Holman, Horse Haggerty, and Ernie Reich being a part of the Reading Bears)).

However, due to not just the Scranton Miners folding operations during the first half of the season, but also seeing both the Harrisburg Club and the similarly connected New York Giants team struggling financially themselves, the EBL would reluctantly add in the Original Celtics as the replacement team for both the Harrisburg Club and the New York Giants on December 15, 1921, albeit with multiple stipulations in mind being added to help make the transition into their entry into the second half of the season feel a lot more natural than what would go down for the conclusion of the first half of this season: the Eastern Basketball League required the court for the Madison Square Garden to utilize a net if a cage could not be utilized for the rules of the game at the time (which ultimately was necessary on their ends, despite complaints on the league members' ends), all home games for the Celtics had to be played at the Madison Square Garden on Sundays regardless of scheduling issues that might come about on their ends, the Celtics chose their final home opponents to close out the first half of the season, and the Celtics would play with baskets that extended out to 12 inches from the backboard as opposed to their original six inches from the backboard at the time (in an era where the basketball was essentially a "medicine ball" at the time and having a jump ball occur after every made basket in a time without a shot clock or half-court lane violations). Because of their late introduction into the first half of the season combined with both the Harrisburg Club and the New York Giants having a combined 1–16 for the first half of the season (with Harrisburg being the team to have the only win between the two teams, while both the Harrisburg Club and the New York Giants had eight losses each), the Original Celtics would close out that half with four straight wins (basically closing that half with a perfect 4–0 record on their ends specifically) to have a 5–16 finish to the first half of the season that still resulted in a last place finish there. Luckily for the Celtics, the split season format meant they had a second chance to compete for a championship with a fresh start and a new record to showcase what they were really made out of to separate them from the other two teams that were first playing in their spot earlier on, even with the EBL being without two teams being around for the majority of that season with the Scranton Miners leaving in the first half of the season and the Philadelphia Phillies technically leaving after one game played in the second half of the season that technically was not officially put in the league's record books that season as well. However, the second half would be quite tumultuous for the Celtics by comparison to the first half of the season.

On February 19, 1922, guard/forward Ernie Reich (a team captain of the Original Celtics from the 1919–20 season where they had a 65–4 record (.942) to start out their history as a future Naismith Basketball Hall of Fame franchise) had caught a bad case of pneumonia; after five days of trying to rest up, Reich was declared dead from it, which led to the Original Celtics dedicating the rest of their season to him following the funeral service held for him in the afternoon of February 26. That week would ultimately be considered the lowest point of time for the Original Celtics during this season, as the Celtics would eventually end up finishing the second half of the season with a 16–4 record, being one game ahead of the Camden Skeeters to be crowned the champions of the second half of the season for the Eastern Basketball League (clinching that spot by the last day of that half of the season). While the Original Celtics would only technically finish their overall season in the EBL with a barely above-average 21–20 record thanks to their great record between their brief first half stint and the more noteworthy second half stint being combined with the poor results from the original Harrisburg Club and New York Giants teams that were originally taking part of the first half of the season there, because they were crowned the second half champions for the season combined with the league's championship format basically revolving around the split season format where the two best teams in each half would compete against each other (regardless of context or circumstances at hand by the time they were ready to compete against each other during that championship series happening), the Original Celtics would end up competing for the EBL's championship series against the Trenton Royal Bengals. Despite the Original Celtics franchise officially playing in 133 total games by the time they completed their championship series in the EBL (with the Celtics' official record for regular season games played being 20–4 during their time spent in the EBL) and complaints that the Original Celtics not competing in an actual cage when professional basketball leagues of the time did utilize cages for their competitions due to them only having rope netting to represent the team's cages for the season, the Original Celtics would end up winning the EBL's championship series 2–1 over the Trenton Royal Bengals, with their final game being notable for the Celtics holding Trenton without a field goal for the last 38 out of 40 minutes of the game in an era where (professional) basketball games were only two 20 minute halves with 10-minute intermission periods (excluding the last three minutes of the game and extra periods/overtimes not having a running clock during that era). In a sense, the Celtics' victory would also technically be considered a championship series victory for both the Harrisburg Club and the New York Giants franchises as well, though it wouldn't really be considered that for either of those teams in a different sense since the Original Celtics franchise would only take over for both the Harrisburg Club and the New York Giants for the (late) first half of the season and not the second half of the season or the championship series that the Original Celtics would win on their own accord.

== Original Celtics Roster ==
Due to information on older professional basketball leagues being hard or impossible to find for players from leagues like the Eastern Basketball League, there may be more gaps and/or inaccuracies found in certain areas on the team's roster spots than usual. However, in this case, it would relate a bit more towards the fact that the Original Celtics would join the EBL at a time when they first were considered to be more like an afterthought for that league at the time, with their players being more jumbled in alongside players that were players for the Harrisburg Club and/or the New York Giants at the time before the Original Celtics effectively took over those teams for good during that season.

1921–22 Original Celtics roster
Players

Pos.	No.	Player	Height	Weight	DOB	From
G/F		Pete Barry	5 ft 11 in (1.80 m)	170 lb (77 kg)	1896-11-16	No college
G/F		John Beckman	5 ft 9 in (1.75 m)	160 lb (73 kg)	1895-10-26	St. Gabriel's Catholic School (NY)
G/F		Dutch Dehnert	6 ft 0 in (1.83 m)	185 lb (84 kg)	1898-04-05	No college
C		Horse Haggerty	6 ft 4 in (1.93 m)	235 lb (107 kg)	1891-07-04	No college
G/F		Bob Hilbert	5 ft 10 in (1.78 m)	160 lb (73 kg)	1899-12-17	No college
G/F		Nat Holman	5 ft 11 in (1.80 m)	170 lb (77 kg)	1896-10-19	Savage School of Physical Education
F/C		Chris Leonard	6 ft 3 in (1.91 m)	190 lb (86 kg)	1890-02-10	Manhattan
G/F		Ernie Reich	5 ft 8 in (1.73 m)	155 lb (70 kg)	1892-11-24	St. Gabriel's Catholic School (NY)
G/F		Mike Smolick	5 ft 9 in (1.75 m)	175 lb (79 kg)	1890-06-05	No college
G/F		Johnny Whitty	5 ft 9 in (1.75 m)	175 lb (79 kg)	1896-02-02	No college

Coaches
Head coach

Johnny Whitty

Legend
- (DP) Unsigned draft pick
- (FA) Free agent
- (S) Suspended
- Injured

In addition to Ernie Reich dying during the season due to pneumonia, Mike Smolick also only was a part of the team's roster during the early part of the season. Because of this, the championship series' roster for the Original Celtics team during this season would include John "Pete" Barry, John Beckman, Dutch Dehnert, George "Horse" Haggerty, Nat Holman, and Chris Leonard, with Johnny Whitty being an emergency player-coach for the team as well just in case they needed it during the series.

=== Harrisburg Club & New York Giants Rosters ===
Due to information on older professional basketball leagues being generally hard (if not outright impossible these days) to find for players from leagues like the Eastern Basketball League, there are bound to be more gaps and/or inaccuracies found in certain areas on the team's roster spots than usual. However, in this case, it would relate a bit more towards the fact that both the Harrisburg Club and New York Giants had rosters that overlapped with each other at times (namely with the likes of Kid Franckle and Jack Lawrence playing for both teams) before the Original Celtics effectively took over their position(s) in the EBL for the rest of the season, meaning that players would be listed out from both teams in one whole roster listing, but would ultimately have notes that helped separate who was on the Harrisburg roster and who was on the New York Giants roster (and who even played for both teams on such rare occasions).

Player	Position
Davey Banks#	G
Buddy Bushman#	G/F
Jimmy Doyle*	F
Kid Franckle*#	G/F
Marty Friedman#	G/F
Lou Goldie#	G
Walter Griscom*	F
Jimmy Jemail#	G
Jack Lawrence*#	C
Al Lehr*	F
Ike McCord*	G
Paul Meyers#	G/F
Sam Moorehead*	G
Ernie Reich#	G/F
Harry Riconda#	G/F
Garry Schmeelk#	F
Barney Sedran#	G
Cy Simendinger*	G/F
Dick Smyth#	G/F
Eddie Wallower*	G/F

* – Played for the Harrisburg Club.
# – Played for the New York Giants.

== Eastern Basketball League Standings ==
First Half
Team	Wins	Losses	Winning %
Trenton Royal Bengals	24	3	.889
Camden Skeeters	20	7	.741
Scranton Miners†	11	11	.500
Wilkes-Barre (Coal) Barons	10	13	.435
Reading Bears	10	14	.417
Coatesville Coats	8	14	.364
Philadelphia Phillies†	5	15	.250
Harrisburg Club / New York Giants / Original Celtics*	5	16	.238

† – Dropped out of the league following the conclusion of the first half of the season.
* – Team moved operations and were bought out by another franchise during the season, with the Original Celtics being the final franchise to hold onto that specific spot during the rest of the season.

Second Half
Team	Wins	Losses	Winning %
Original Celtics*	16	4	.800
Camden Skeeters	15	5	.775
Trenton Royal Bengals	15	5	.775
Coatesville Coats	5	14	.283
Wilkes-Barre (Coal) Barons	3	13	.188
Reading Bears	2	15	.118

* – The Original Celtics held onto the spot that was originally held by both the Harrisburg Club and the New York Giants during the first half of the season throughout the entire second half of the season, being the sole representatives there during that half of the season.

== Eastern Basketball League Championship Series ==
Trenton Royal Bengals (1st Half Champions) Vs. Original Celtics (2nd Half Champions): Original Celtics win series 2–1

- Game 1: March 31, 1922 @ New York: Original Celtics 24, Trenton Royal Bengals 20 (Interestingly was a part of a doubleheader series the Celtics had with regards to another playoff match of sorts against the Holyoke Reds that supposedly was held in Holyoke, Massachusetts, with the Celtics winning 28–18 for that particular match.)
- Game 2: April 1, 1922 @ Trenton: Trenton Royal Bengals 22, Original Celtics 17
- Game 3: April 5, 1922 @ Camden, New Jersey: Original Celtics 27, Trenton Royal Bengals 22

The Original Celtics would win their first ever professional basketball championship this season. With the overall number of games played beyond just the Eastern Basketball League, the Original Celtics could also lay claim to being the overall champions in the sport of basketball for that season as well.
