= 1929–30 New York Original Celtics season =

- League: American Basketball League (original)
- Head coach: Nat Holman
- General manager: Jim Furey & Johnny Whitty(?)
- Owner(s): Jim Furey (Original Celtics)
- Arena: Jamaica Arena

Results
- Record: 5–5 (.500)
- Place: Conference: N/A (7th/8th for the 1st half)
- Playoff finish: Did not qualify (Folded operations during first half of the season; team records were stricken from the ABL's record books soon afterward.)

The 1929–30 Original Celtics season was officially the fifth (and initially final) professional basketball season ever held by the team that was known as the Original Celtics officially. However, this season would also (potentially) be considered the sixteenth season of independent play as well for the Celtics, though it can reasonably be considered their fifteenth season properly due to the New York Hakoahs replacing the Original Celtics entirely during this period of time. After the Original Celtics were suspended from the ABL during the 1928–29 season and the team was essentially replaced by the New York Hakoahs (at least in a relative sense) due to the Celtics' primary team owner, Jim Furey, going to Sing Sing prison for embezzlement, the Original Celtics would take over the position of the New York Hakoahs' spot in the league due to Jim Furey being released from prison and became the new team from New York representing the state for the rest of the season. As a result of this return on their ends, the Celtics would bring back the "New York (Original) Celtics" name for their (brief) time spent in the ABL this season as well. Despite regaining control of the Original Celtics and being the official replacement for the New York Hakoahs in the ABL for this season, the Celtics would only have three players from their original era of teams in Davey Banks, John Beckman, and Nat Holman be back with the team for the Original Celtics' return to play in the ABL, which further showcased how the Celtics by this point in time were not the same dominant team that they were from 1919 all the way up until 1928.

While the Original Celtics would try their absolute hardest to be as competitive and successful during this season of play as they were during their highest era of success before the ABL forced the team to break up its roster, the overall composition of the team by the time Jim Furey came back to revive the team just would not be the same as it was back when his team first ruled the basketball world. As such, after having an average 5–5 record in the only ten games the Celtics competed in while being in the ABL, the Original Celtics would end up defecting from the ABL on December 19, 1929, with the ten games that the Celtics played in this season ultimately being struck out of the league's records during this period of time. (More specifically, the ABL's financial records for the 1930 year showcased that Jim Furey had receipts of $3,100 for Davey Banks (which he had later sent off to the Fort Wayne Hoosiers) alongside $500 receipts for both John Beckman and Nat Holman, with Beckman being sent off to the Cleveland Rosenblums and Holman briefly being sent off to the Syracuse All-Americans for the first half of the season before finishing his playing career with the Chicago Bruins throughout the rest of the season.) While the Celtics would continue trying to be a successful barnstorming team once again by this point in time, the long-term effects of the Great Depression would end up kicking in for the Original Celtics franchise even in their time spent as an independent team instead of while playing as a professional basketball team as well. As such, after the Celtics ended up winning another world championship tournament despite the team not competing in the ABL by this time and having its roster being broken up (with the majority of the original, successful teams in the ABL actually being a part of the Cleveland Rosenblums by this point in time), Jim Furey would decide to fold his rendition of the Original Celtics franchise by the end of this season, officially marking this season as the final season of his own franchise's existence after previously taking over the New York Celtics franchise from Frank "Tip" McCormack following the World War I period and essentially making the "Original" Celtics his own franchise in the process from its first season under that name onward. However, this wouldn't necessarily be the end of the Original Celtics franchise entirely on its own accord, as Max Rosenblum would ironically revive the Original Celtics under the name of the "Max Rosenblum Celtics" after he would (surprisingly) decide to fold his Cleveland Rosenblums franchise from the ABL due in part to detrimental rule changes that Rosenblum felt was targeting a player he had acquired from the Original Celtics in the first place. Rosenblum's personal revival of the "Original Celtics" would soon impart a chain reaction of multiple teams (supposedly) utilizing the same Original Celtics name, history, and team lore for their own franchises as well, with one of those teams that were owned by singer Kate Smith and talent manager Ted Collins eventually using the "New York Celtics" name (potentially going by the New York (Original) Celtics as well by that point in time) to return to a since-revived American Basketball League that would become more like a regional basketball league after being revived in 1933 than the originally planned national basketball league that the ABL was first going for before it ended up going defunct (albeit only briefly) in 1931 due to the long-term effects of the Great Depression there.

== Roster ==
Due to information on American Basketball League players being generally hard to find, there are bound to be more gaps and/or inaccuracies found in certain areas on the team's roster spots than usual.

1929–30 New York Original Celtics roster
Players

Pos.	No.	Player	Height	Weight	DOB	From
G/F		Davey Banks	5 ft 7 in (1.70 m)	155 lb (70 kg)	1901-01-04	No college
G/F		John Beckman	5 ft 9 in (1.75 m)	160 lb (73 kg)	1895-10-26	St. Gabriel's Catholic School (NY)
G		Bill Bergin	6 ft 0 in (1.83 m)	195 lb (88 kg)	1899-07-12	No college
G/F		Tony Calland	5 ft 7 in (1.70 m)	155 lb (70 kg)	1902-09-02	No college
F/C		Jack Cremens	6 ft 3 in (1.91 m)	180 lb (82 kg)	1900-07-01	St. Benedict's Prep (NJ)
G/F		Nat Holman	5 ft 11 in (1.80 m)	170 lb (77 kg)	1896-10-19	Savage School of Physical Education
C		Hank Knudsen	6 ft 5 in (1.96 m)	180 lb (82 kg)	1905-09-16	No college
F		Willie McDonald			1904	No college
G/F		Bill McElwain	5 ft 11 in (1.80 m)	175 lb (79 kg)	1905-10-09	No college
C		Stretch Meehan	6 ft 7 in (2.01 m)	220 lb (100 kg)	1897-04-17	Seton Hall
G		Harry Riconda	5 ft 10 in (1.78 m)	175 lb (79 kg)	1897-03-17	Newtown HS (NY)
G		Frank Stuchbury	5 ft 9 in (1.75 m)	145 lb (66 kg)	1902-11-17	No college

Coaches
Head coach

Nat Holman

Legend
- (DP) Unsigned draft pick
- (FA) Free agent
- (S) Suspended
- Injured

== American Basketball League Standings ==
First Half
Team	Wins	Losses	Winning %
Cleveland Rosenblums	17	7	.738
Brooklyn Visitations	15	9	.625
Rochester Centrals	14	10	.583
Chicago Bruins	12	12	.500
Fort Wayne Hoosiers	12	12	.500
Paterson Crescents	10	14	.417
Syracuse All-Americans†	4	20	.167
New York (Original) Celtics†*	5	5	.500

† – Withdrew from the ABL before the first half of the season officially ended, with the New York (Original) Celtics dropping out of the league on December 19, 1929 and the Syracuse All-Americans dropping out of the ABL (and forfeiting their final four games of the first half of the season by default) on January 6, 1930 near the end of the first half of the season.
* – Withdrew from the ABL after playing only ten total games during the first half of this season, with their games being stricken from the official league record books during this season despite having an average record this season.

Second Half
Team	Wins	Losses	Winning %
Rochester Centrals	19	11	.633
Cleveland Rosenblums	18	12	.600
Chicago Bruins	17	13	.567
Brooklyn Visitations	15	15	.500
Fort Wayne Hoosiers	13	17	.433
Paterson Crescents	8	22	.267
