= 1937–38 Bronx / New York Yankees season =

- League: American Basketball League (revived original)
- Head coach: Mac Posnack
- General manager: Mac Posnack
- Owner(s): Mac Posnack(?)
- Arena: Bronx Coliseum

Results
- Record: 1–11 (.083)
- Place: Conference: 7th (1st half)
- Playoff finish: Did not qualify

The 1937–38 Bronx / New York Yankees season was the first and only professional basketball season played by the team original Bronx Yankees turned New York Yankees basketball franchise that first started out in The Bronx area of New York City before they rebranded themselves to represent the state of New York as a whole instead, with this team not being related to the New York Yankees Major League Baseball team. Entering this season, the Yankees would originally be one of seven teams competing in the league to win the ABL's championship for this season. However, after the Bronx Yankees (who later turned into the New York Yankees during the season) ended up only getting one single victory in the first half of the season, which led to them getting a 1–11 for a last place finish at seventh place there, the Yankees would end up leaving the ABL by January 11, 1938, which would be around the time the first half of the season was still going on properly. Despite this Yankees team never returning to the ABL, they would end up making a brief cameo appearance at the inaugural World Professional Basketball Tournament held the following year in 1939. Interestingly, the Yankees would end up winning their first round match 40–32 over the Brenton Harbor House of David team before being eliminated in the quarterfinal round to the eventual WPBT champion New York Renaissance by a 30–21 final score. Their appearance in the WPBT would be considered the last known appearance of that specific Yankees team, though there would later be a Harlem Yankees team (which would be unrelated to this Yankees basketball team) that would enter the ABL in its waning years with the Saratoga Harlem Yankees (as they're best known for in their time of existence) competing there from the late 1940s up until 1953 when the ABL ended up shutting down operations.

== Roster ==
Due to information on American Basketball League players being generally hard to find, there are bound to be more gaps and/or inaccuracies found in certain areas on the team's roster spots than usual.

Player	Position(s)
Dave Bass	F
George Christiensen	F
Larry Dodick	G
Harry Fitzgerald	G
Java Gotkin	G
Rip Kaplinsky	G
Sol Kolpitko	C
Dixie Lee	F
Venty Leib	G/F
Jimmy McNally	F
Leo Merson	F
Tidy Millen	G
Jake Pelkington	C
Mac Posnack	F
Tom Ryan	C
Bernie Schiffer	G

== American Basketball League Standings ==
First Half
Team	Wins	Losses	Winning %
Jersey Reds	16	6	.727
New Haven Jewels / New York Jewels^{[a]}	12	8	.600
Brooklyn Visitations	13	10	.565
Philadelphia SPHAs	12	10	.545
New York (Original) Celtics	11	10	.524
Kingston Colonials	5	15	.250
New York Yankees^{[b]}	1	11	.083

Second Half
Team	Wins	Losses	Winning %
New York Jewels^{[a]}	14	5	.737
Jersey Reds	13	7	.650
Philadelphia SPHAs	11	9	.550
Kingston Colonials	9	9	.500
New York (Original) Celtics	7	11	.389
Brooklyn Visitations	2	15	.118

== Notes ==
^{a} Before the season began, the Brooklyn Jewels moved from Brooklyn, New York to New Haven, Connecticut to become the New Haven Jewels to start out the season. However, on November 30, 1937, the team moved back from New Haven to Brooklyn to once again return to their original New York Jewels name for the rest of the season.
^{b} The Bronx / New York Yankees basketball team would drop out of the ABL on January 11, 1938 during the first half of the season.
