= 1926–27 Brooklyn Celtics season =

1926–27 Original Celtics season
- Conference champions
- League: National Basketball League
- Head coach: Johnny Whitty
- General manager: Jim Furey & Johnny Whitty
- Owner(s): Jim Furey
- Arena: Arcadia Hall; Arcola Park

Results
- Record: 14–3 (.824)
- Place: Conference: 1st
- Playoff finish: League folded operations by the ABL's strongman takeover on December 14, 1926.

1926–27 Brooklyn Celtics season
- League champions
- League: American Basketball League (original)
- Head coach: Johnny Whitty
- General manager: Jim Furey & Johnny Whitty (Original Brooklyn Celtics)
- Owner(s): Jim Furey & The Nonpareil Club of Brooklyn (Original Celtics)
- Arena: Arcadia Hall

Results
- Record: 32–5 (.865)
- Place: Conference: 1st/4th (1st half); 1st (2nd half for Brooklyn Celtics)
- Playoff finish: Brooklyn Celtics won ABL Championship 3–0 over Cleveland Rosenblums

The 1926–27 Brooklyn Celtics season was the third professional basketball season ever held by the team that was known as the Original Celtics officially, as well as (technically) their first and only season of play under the Brooklyn Celtics name. However, this season would also (potentially) be considered the thirteenth season of independent play as well for the Celtics. Initially, the team was first slated to only play in the American Basketball League (a professional basketball league that didn't use cages within the basketball court to eliminate the out of bounds violation unlike the Eastern Basketball League the Celtics originally competed in) alongside the Baltimore Orioles and the Philadelphia Quakers / Warriors as one of the three newest teams of the ABL there (albeit in a reluctant manner for the Celtics since they saw the ABL as a bit too constraining for their purposes of financial success after previously (supposedly) denying themselves entry into the ABL in its inaugural season out of protest due to them being in solidarity with the all-black New York Renaissance after they were also denied entry into the ABL due to racial segregation) before the Celtics decided to switch out from playing within the ABL to the intended rivaling National Basketball League (who wouldn't be related to the National Basketball League that would eventually be considered a predecessor to the present day National Basketball Association, but instead were essentially a rebranded version of the Metropolitan Basketball League that the Celtics had intended to join at first before declining due to how few games and how tiny the venues they had to play in were this time around) to start out the season. While the Original Celtics would try to start out their season in the NBL like they did in the other professional basketball leagues they played in before this point in time (with the Celtics earning 30 cents for a guarantee of $300 for each road game on each ticket sold when every other NBL team earned 20 cents for a guarantee of $200 for each road game on each ticket sold), the Celtics would end up agreeing with the ABL behind the scenes to defect from the NBL to the ABL, which they not only able to succeed upon on December 14, 1926 (after being the best team of the NBL by that point in time with a 14–3 record to just about conclude what would have been the first half of the season there), but also subsequently would end up replacing the Brooklyn Arcadians / Rockets (who ended up losing all five games played in the second ABL season ever held) and took over their position for the first half of the season, though they'd compete under the Brooklyn Celtics name for the rest of this season going forward only. As such, one could technically label this Original Celtics season as that of the "Brooklyn Arcadians / (Original) Brooklyn Celtics" this time around instead of just an Original Celtics season only, similar to how the 1921–22 season could technically be considered that of the "Harrisburg Club / New York Giants / Original Celtics" and the 1922–23 season could also technically be considered that of the "Atlantic City Sandpipers / Original Celtics" (albeit to a much lesser degree for that specific season since it'd only work for their brief time in the final season of the (original) Eastern Basketball League there by comparison to their time spent either independently or within the rivaling Metropolitan Basketball League) as well (with this technically being the last time in the original history of the Original Celtics franchise that their team history can be merged with other teams during a season). Not only that, but the ABL saw the coup of the Original Celtics coming over to their league (albeit as the Brooklyn Celtics just for this season) as restoring some positive reputations within their league early on after the Original Celtics ironically damaged it by being considered champions of basketball themselves after previously beating ABL teams like the now-former Brooklyn Arcadians, the Rochester Centrals, the now-nonexistant Boston Whirlwinds, and the Washington Palace Five / Laundryman in convincing manners (outside of one exhibition game that the Centrals won the previous season) in their previous (20 exhibition) games played that season.

During their time spent in the American Basketball League, the Brooklyn Celtics would try their absolute hardest to overcome the Brooklyn Arcadians' 0–5 start to the (first half of the) season while they were forced to utilize it as a personal disadvantage during this season. However, the early poor start by the Arcadians franchise would ultimate prove to be far too insurmountable for the Celtics franchise to overcome in the first half of the season, as while the Brooklyn Celtics' 13–3 record would be worthy of a first place finish in that half of the season, the five lost games by the original Arcadians / Rockets franchise would end up slipping the technically combined Brooklyn franchise downward from first place to fourth place behind the new Philadelphia Quakers / Phillies (later rebranded as the Philadelphia Warriors) franchise that were essentially the Philadelphia Sphas playing in the (original) ABL, the Washington Palace Five / Laundrymen, and the defending ABL champion Cleveland Rosenblums. Luckily for the Brooklyn Celtics, they would end up having a fresh new start for the second half of the season, which would end up working out incredibly well in the Celtics' favor with them ending the second half of the season with a 19–2 (with the two losses in question coming from two out of three matches they had played against the surprisingly below-average Philadelphia Warriors this half-season). Had their solo record in the first half of the season coincided with the victories they had in the second half of the season, the Brooklyn Celtics would have been considered the automatic champions of the ABL by default. As things stood, however, the Celtics needed to compete in a best-of-five championship series against the champions of the first half of the season, the Cleveland Rosenblums, due to the split season format the ABL was utilizing for this season. Despite the Celtics still having to deal with competing in a championship series in the ABL during their first season in that league, the Brooklyn Celtics would end up sweeping the defending champions of the ABL in a 3–0 series sweep, which led to the Celtics getting their second overall professional basketball championship after previously winning their inaugural professional basketball season in the Eastern Basketball League. Not only that, but in a sense, the Celtics' victory would also technically be considered a championship series victory for the Brooklyn Arcadians as well, but not really since similar to the Celtics' inaugural season in the Eastern Basketball League when they took over for both the Harrisburg Club and the New York Giants, the Celtics would only combine the Arcadians' first half history with their own first half history, with the Celtics only being champions for the second half of the season alongside the overall league in relation to their second half season victory. This season would also essentially be parallel to that of their 1921–22 season (excluding the surprising tragic death of a beloved player of theirs) due to how their first season in the ABL almost mirrored that to their first ever professional basketball season as a franchise back when they played in the EBL. Not only that, but if one were to combine the records from the Celtics' times spent in both the NBL and the ABL together, their overall professional record for the season would be 46–8 (.852) since it would exclude the five straight losses by the Brooklyn Arcadians to start out their tenure in the ABL.

== "Original" Brooklyn Celtics Roster ==
Due to information on older professional basketball leagues being generally hard (if not outright impossible these days) to find for players from leagues like the "original" National Basketball League and the American Basketball League (the latter league to a lesser extent by comparison to the former league in question), there are bound to be more gaps and/or inaccuracies found in certain areas on the team's roster spots than usual.

1926–27 "Original" Brooklyn Celtics roster
Players

Pos.	No.	Player	Height	Weight	DOB	From
G/F		Davey Banks	5 ft 7 in (1.70 m)	155 lb (70 kg)	1901-01-04	No college
G/F		Pete Barry	5 ft 11 in (1.80 m)	170 lb (77 kg)	1896-11-16	No college
G/F		John Beckman	5 ft 9 in (1.75 m)	160 lb (73 kg)	1895-10-26	St. Gabriel's Catholic School (NY)
G/F		Dutch Dehnert	6 ft 0 in (1.83 m)	185 lb (84 kg)	1898-04-05	No college
G/F		Nat Holman	5 ft 11 in (1.80 m)	170 lb (77 kg)	1896-10-19	Savage School of Physical Education
C		Joe Lapchick	6 ft 5 in (1.96 m)	185 lb (84 kg)	1900-04-12	No college
F/C		Chris Leonard	6 ft 3 in (1.91 m)	190 lb (86 kg)	1890-02-10	Manhattan
G/F		Johnny Whitty	5 ft 9 in (1.75 m)	175 lb (79 kg)	1896-02-02	No college

Coaches
Head coach

Johnny Whitty

Legend
- (DP) Unsigned draft pick
- (FA) Free agent
- (S) Suspended
- Injured

Note: John Beckman would not be with the "Original" Brooklyn Celtics by January 1927, with Johnny Whitty also not playing for the team properly by the time they were in the American Basketball League.

== Team Standings ==
=== National Basketball League Standings ===
Team	Wins	Losses	Winning %
Original Celtics	14	3	.824
Brooklyn Visitations	18	7	.720
Greenpoint Knights of St. Anthony/Trenton Royal Bengals	11	11	.500
Paterson Legionnaires/Kingston Raiders	8	13	.381
Ridgewood/Newburgh Hillsides	3	12	.200
Ridgewood/Orange Skeeters	2	9	.222
Newburgh Hillsides/Jersey City Skeeters	1	9	.100

The National Basketball League folded operations on December 14, 1926 with the Original Celtics defecting from the NBL to the rivaling ABL soon afterward. (Interestingly, the Brooklyn Visitations would join the ABL themselves a season afterward.) At least one source would officially label the Original Celtics during this period of time as the "New York-Arcola Original Celtics" instead of just the Original Celtics due to the mixture of them playing in both New York City and Arcola, New Jersey in regards to their home games within this version of the National Basketball League instead of just in New York City in the state of New York like they had done in some of their previous seasons (though this problem wouldn't occur by the time they transferred operations into the ABL later on in this season instead).

=== American Basketball League Standings ===
First Half
Team	Wins	Losses	Winning %
Cleveland Rosenblums	17	4	.810
Washington Palace Five / Laundrymen	16	5	.762
Philadelphia Quakers / Phillies*	14	7	.667
Brooklyn Arcadians/Brooklyn Celtics**	13	8	.619
Fort Wayne Hoosiers	8	13	.381
Rochester Centrals	8	13	.381
Chicago Bruins	7	14	.333
Baltimore Orioles	1	20	.048
Detroit Pulaski Post Five / Pulaski / Lions†	0	6	.000

* – The Philadelphia Sphas would replace the Philadelphia Quakers during the second half of the season, albeit while playing under the original Philadelphia Warriors name instead of their typical Philadelphia SPHAs name.
** – After playing only in five total games this season (all of which ended in defeats), the Brooklyn Arcadians would have their franchise rights be both transferred and replaced by the Original Celtics franchise under the temporarily implemented name of the Brooklyn Celtics for the rest of this season in the ABL.
† – Withdrew from the ABL after playing only six total games during the first half of this season, with their games being stricken from the official league record books during this season.

Second Half
Team	Wins	Losses	Winning %
Brooklyn Celtics*	19	2	.905
Fort Wayne Hoosiers	15	6	.714
Washington Palace Five / Laundrymen	14	7	.667
Philadelphia Warriors**	10	11	.476
Cleveland Rosenblums	9	12	.429
Chicago Bruins	6	15	.286
Rochester Centrals	6	15	.286
Baltimore Orioles	5	16	.238

* – After playing only five total games this season (all of which ended in defeats), the Brooklyn Arcadians would have their franchise rights be both transferred and replaced by the Original Celtics franchise under the temporarily implemented name of the Brooklyn Celtics for the rest of this season in the ABL.
** – The Philadelphia Sphas would replace the Philadelphia Quakers during the second half of the season, albeit while playing under the original Philadelphia Warriors name instead of their typical Philadelphia SPHAs name.

== American Basketball League Championship Series ==
Cleveland Rosenblums (1st Half Champions) Vs. Brooklyn Celtics (2nd Half Champions): Brooklyn Celtics win series 3–0

- Game 1: April 6, 1927 @ Cleveland: Brooklyn Celtics 29, Cleveland Rosenblums 21
- Game 2: April 7, 1927 @ Cleveland: Brooklyn Celtics 28, Cleveland Rosenblums 20
- Game 3: April 9, 1927 @ Brooklyn: Brooklyn Celtics 35, Cleveland Rosenblums 32

The Original Celtics would win their first ever ABL championship and second overall professional basketball championship this season (though this season would list them as the Brooklyn Celtics instead of their own, proper Original Celtics name due to the way the Celtics entered the ABL this season by effectively replacing the Brooklyn Arcadians). A more detailed analysis of the 1927 ABL championship series of games played can be found on APBR.org, with the Celtics also claiming five freelance national basketball championships before this point in time as well.
