= 1926–27 Baltimore Orioles season =

- League: American Basketball League (original)
- Head coach: Lou Sugarman (1st half player-coach); John Beckman (2nd half player-coach)
- Arena: Carling's Green Palace

Results
- Record: 6–36 (.143)
- Place: Conference: 8th (both halves)
- Playoff finish: Did not qualify

The 1926–27 Baltimore Orioles season was the first and only season professional basketball season of play for the Baltimore Orioles basketball team in the city of Baltimore, Maryland under the original version of the American Basketball League, which was the first professional basketball league that had truly attempted to go fully national after previous professional basketball leagues were mostly regional at the time. For the second straight season in a row, the American Basketball League would start out their season with nine teams competing in the split season formatting, with the two half seasons being utilized instead of one whole season being utilized throughout the entire season (which would be the case throughout the majority of the league's existence in the first place). Not only that, but after previously being considered to have a franchise for the inaugural ABL season, the city of Baltimore would end up being the only location out of the previously rejected spots of Milwaukee, Wisconsin and multiple Ohio cities in Camden, Columbus, and East Liverpool to have an ABL team be approved for this season instead. However, unlike the previous season of play, not only would the original Brooklyn Arcadians team (sometimes referred to as the Brooklyn Rockets) end up being replaced by the Original Celtics under the temporary distinction of the Brooklyn Celtics for this season only, but the Detroit Pulaski Post Five / Lions would end up folding operations after six straight losses to their season (and by extension, get their record officially stricken from the record books entirely), with the Philadelphia Quakers / Phillies team also later being replaced by the Philadelphia Sphas under the Philadelphia Warriors name that would inspire the future Golden State Warriors NBA team by the time the second half of the season began. Despite the Orioles basketball team not having their own basketball team get raided by the rivaling National Basketball League (which was a brief attempt by the Metropolitan Basketball League to steal the clout that the American Basketball League had at the time, though this version of the NBL would not be related to the (later) version of the National Basketball League that eventually merged operations with the Basketball Association of America to become the present-day National Basketball Association), Baltimore would not only end up having their squad join the dredges of the later defunct Brooklyn Arcadians and Detroit Pulaski Post Five / Lions for teams that would be winless to start out the season before the ABL made big moves to reverse their fortunes over the NBL this season, but they'd also end up having the worst record of the first half of the season in terms of teams that ended up surviving the season properly by almost being winless throughout that entire half of the season with a 1–20 to officially be last place there. Luckily for the Orioles, they would end up getting a major coup for the second half of the season by acquiring the Original Celtics' John Beckman in an attempt to become a better franchise for the second half of the season. Unfortunately for Baltimore, while the Orioles basketball team would end up winning some more games for the second half of the season by comparison to the dreadful first half of the season that they had, they still wouldn't end up winning enough games to get past any of the other ABL teams this season, as Baltimore would finish the second half of the season with a just as bad 5–16 record, being one game shy from tying the Chicago Bruins and Rochester Centrals for sixth place in that half of the season instead. With that said, the poor performances by the Orioles throughout the entire season, even with the addition of an Original Celtics player joining their team, led to Baltimore exiting out of the league by the time the ABL's third season began.

== Roster ==
Due to information on American Basketball League players being generally hard to find, there are bound to be more gaps and/or inaccuracies found in certain areas on the team's roster spots than usual.

Player	Position
Tom Barlow	G
John Beckman	F
Whitey Bernot	F
Buddy Bushman	G/F
Duke Byron	F
Jack Cremens	C
Snooks Dowd	F
Doc Edelson	G/F
Nick Harvey	G
Joe Hoffman	G/F
Walter Jamieson	G/F
Teddy Kearns	G/F
Fritz Knothe	F
Moyer Krakovitch	G
Dutch Lentz	G/F
Stretch Miller	F/C
Earl Moser	G/F
Jammy Moskovitz	G
Mike Mumby	G/F
Jiggs O'Dell	G/F
Main Rich	F
Sam Siegel	F/C
Lefty Stern	G/F
Lou Sugarman	G/F
Jerry Sullivan	G/F
Hank Thomas	G/F
Joe Wallace	C

== American Basketball League Standings ==
First Half
Team	Wins	Losses	Winning %
Cleveland Rosenblums	17	4	.810
Washington Palace Five / Laundrymen	16	5	.762
Philadelphia Quakers / Phillies*	14	7	.667
Brooklyn Arcadians/Brooklyn Celtics**	13	8	.619
Fort Wayne Hoosiers	8	13	.381
Rochester Centrals	8	13	.381
Chicago Bruins	7	14	.333
Baltimore Orioles	1	20	.048
Detroit Pulaski Post Five / Pulaski / Lions†	0	6	.000

* – The Philadelphia Sphas would replace the Philadelphia Quakers during the second half of the season, albeit while playing under the original Philadelphia Warriors name instead of their typical Philadelphia SPHAs name.
** – After playing only in five total games this season (all of which ended in defeats), the Brooklyn Arcadians would have their franchise rights be both transferred and replaced by the Original Celtics franchise under the temporarily implemented name of the Brooklyn Celtics for the rest of this season in the ABL.
† – Withdrew from the ABL after playing only six total games during the first half of this season, with their games being stricken from the official league record books during this season.

Second Half
Team	Wins	Losses	Winning %
Brooklyn Celtics*	19	2	.905
Fort Wayne Hoosiers	15	6	.714
Washington Palace Five / Laundrymen	14	7	.667
Philadelphia Warriors**	10	11	.476
Cleveland Rosenblums	9	12	.429
Chicago Bruins	6	15	.286
Rochester Centrals	6	15	.286
Baltimore Orioles	5	16	.238

* – After playing only five total games this season (all of which ended in defeats), the Brooklyn Arcadians would have their franchise rights be both transferred and replaced by the Original Celtics franchise under the temporarily implemented name of the Brooklyn Celtics for the rest of this season in the ABL.
** – The Philadelphia Sphas would replace the Philadelphia Quakers during the second half of the season, albeit while playing under the original Philadelphia Warriors name instead of their typical Philadelphia SPHAs name.
