= 1927–28 New York Original Celtics season =

- League champions
- Division champions
- League: American Basketball League (original)
- Head coach: Johnny Whitty
- General manager: Jim Furey & Johnny Whitty
- Owner(s): Tex Rickard
- Arena: Madison Square Garden

Results
- Record: 40–9 (.816)
- Place: Division: 1st (Eastern)
- Playoff finish: ABL Champions (Won 3–1 over Fort Wayne Hoosiers); Won overall basketball championship series 2–1 over New York Renaissance

The 1927–28 Original Celtics season was the fourth professional basketball season ever held by the team that was known as the Original Celtics officially. However, this season would also (potentially) be considered the fourteenth season of independent play as well for the Celtics. It would also be their only full season of play in the original American Basketball League where the Original Celtics franchise would play a full season within the ABL before it ended up shutting down briefly in 1931 due to the Great Depression (though the ABL would return two years later in 1933 as something more akin to a regional, professional basketball league instead of their originally planned national, professional basketball league that they're doing in this original iteration of the ABL). Not only that, but it was also the only season in the original ABL's run where the teams that were a part of this league would compete in a full regular season akin to what would be found in most professional leagues in the present day era instead of utilizing a split season format like what was held during the previous season of play there, with the ABL also being split into two divisions in the Eastern Division (which the Celtics competed in) and the Western Division, as well as the first season where the league would adopt rules to curtail rough play in their league with five personal fouls disqualifying players from the game and fines of around $10-25 occurring for players that either were fighting or said profanities out loud. After the Original Celtics temporarily took on the moniker of the Brooklyn Celtics in their first season in the ABL due to them taking on the position originally held by the Brooklyn Arcadians during the first half of that season, the Celtics would decide to return to their Original Celtics name once again for this season, though they would actually officially play as the New York Celtics or New York Original Celtics (sometimes even having the word "Original" be held in parentheses) during this season instead due in part to Tex Rickard (the tenant from Madison Square Garden in that time) taking over ownership from the Furey brothers, who had been struggling financially during the offseason period. This season's roster would also be a repeat of what they had from the previous season when playing as the Brooklyn Celtics, only with John Beckman being replaced by Joe Dreyfus in the process.

Throughout this entire season, outside of a slower 4–2 start to the season (that was seen as sneaky due to them only competing against the Washington Palace Five (/ Laundrymen) and the rivaling Philadelphia Warriors throughout the start of the season), the Celtics were seen as the outright leaders of the entire league, with the Eastern Division being seen as more of a bloodbath than the Western Division was due to how both the Celtics and the rivaling Philadelphia Warriors were competing to be the best team of the entire league (never mind the Eastern Division) alongside the Washington Palace Five (/ Laundrymen) turned Brooklyn Visitations (a team the Celtics first went up against in the original National Basketball League) and the Rochester Centrals trying their hardest to overtake the Warriors as the only other Eastern Division playoff team that season, while the Western Division saw one team in the Detroit Cardinals / Olympians fold operations during the season and the two best teams of that division had already been secured by the midway point of the season due to the Chicago Bruins having a very poor record by comparison to the Fort Wayne Hoosiers and the inaugural league champion Cleveland Rosenblums. By the end of the season, the Celtics would become the best team of the entire ABL with a very impressive 40–9 record (being the only team to be below even 20 losses, never mind 10 losses in terms of the surviving teams this season), with them ending the season by not only sweeping the Philadelphia Warriors in the Eastern Division Playoff, but also claim their second straight ABL championship (and third overall professional league basketball championship) by defeating the Fort Wayne Hoosiers three games to one in the ABL's championship series (though The Philadelphia Inquirer incorrectly thought the Celtics already won the championship in the third game and failed to cover the fourth and final game in the process due to them thinking the series was a best-of-three championship series instead of a best-of-five championship series). Despite the overwhelming success the Celtics had, their success would be seen as a double-edged sword for the rest of the league due to fans wanting to see the Original Celtics compete in their city when they had a match come up against them (with fans in said other areas potentially hoping to see the Celtics lose in the process), but failing to attract the same high numbers when playing in the Madison Square Garden by comparison and also having low attendance numbers throughout games played that didn't involve the Celtics whatsoever. The negative impact within the rest of the ABL combined with Tex Rickard selling the team back to the Furey brothers (notably Jim Furey) by the time the season ended due to the Madison Square Garden not getting the high crowds that Rickard was hoping for and Jim Furey going to Sing Sing prison for a year due to embezzling a local department store business within the state of New York called the Arnold Constable Corporation out of over $100,000 (later confirmed to be a total of $187,000) led to the Original Celtics being suspended for the 1928–29 season and being replaced in the ABL by the New York Hakoahs (a team that was mostly Jewish and would have a couple of the Original Celtics' players by that point in time) and subsequently being broken apart not long afterward by the rest of the ABL. While the ABL would see some short-term success early on at first, the results of the Original Celtics being broken apart by the time they were allowed to come back for the 1929–30 season following Joe Furey's prison sentence combined with the long-standing, long-term effects of the Great Depression would see it ultimately fold a season after the Original Celtics failed to survive in the ABL themselves, though the ABL would end up reviving itself a couple of years later in 1933 to be more of a regional league instead of a national league, with the Original Celtics (in effect) returning there (if only briefly) as well (albeit under multiple names and venues by comparison to their time in the original ABL). In effect, this season would ultimately be seen as the last great hurrah by the Original Celtics franchise before it, in effect, was forcibly torn apart by outside forces, with various plans to reunite the franchise and reinvigorate what was had from this era ultimately going in vain when it was all said and done.

== Roster ==
Due to information on American Basketball League players being generally hard to find, there are bound to be more gaps and/or inaccuracies found in certain areas on the team's roster spots than usual.

1927–28 New York Original Celtics roster
Players

Pos.	No.	Player	Height	Weight	DOB	From
G/F		Davey Banks	5 ft 7 in (1.70 m)	155 lb (70 kg)	1901-01-04	No college
G/F		Pete Barry	5 ft 11 in (1.80 m)	170 lb (77 kg)	1896-11-16	No college
G/F		Dutch Dehnert	6 ft 0 in (1.83 m)	185 lb (84 kg)	1898-04-05	No college
G/F		Joe Dreyfus	5 ft 9 in (1.75 m)	165 lb (75 kg)	1892-12-11	No college
G/F		Nat Holman	5 ft 11 in (1.80 m)	170 lb (77 kg)	1896-10-19	Savage School of Physical Education
C		Joe Lapchick	6 ft 5 in (1.96 m)	185 lb (84 kg)	1900-04-12	No college
F/C		Chris Leonard	6 ft 3 in (1.91 m)	190 lb (86 kg)	1890-02-10	Manhattan
G/F		Johnny Whitty	5 ft 9 in (1.75 m)	175 lb (79 kg)	1896-02-02	No college

Coaches
Head coach

Johnny Whitty

Legend
- (DP) Unsigned draft pick
- (FA) Free agent
- (S) Suspended
- Injured

Note: Joe Dreyfus would not officially be a part of the team's roster during the ABL Playoffs.

== American Basketball League Standings ==
=== Eastern Division ===
Eastern Division
Team	Wins	Losses	Winning %
New York (Original) Celtics	40	9	.816
Philadelphia Warriors	30	21	.588
Washington Palace Five (/ Laundrymen) / Brooklyn Visitations*	25	26	.490
Rochester Centrals	24	28	.462

* – The Washington Palace Five / Laundrymen franchise would have their franchise rights and record be transferred out to the Brooklyn Visitations by January 3, 1928 for the unofficial second half of the season.

=== Western Division ===
Western Division
Team	Wins	Losses	Winning %
Fort Wayne Hoosiers	27	24	.529
Cleveland Rosenblums	22	29	.431
Chicago Bruins	13	36	.265
Detroit Cardinals / Olympians†	5	13	.278

† – Withdrew from the ABL on January 3, 1928 by the start of the unofficial second half of the season.

== ABL Playoffs ==
For the first time in the ABL's history (and the only time during their initial run when attempting to be a national league instead of a regional league), the ABL would utilize a regular playoff format of sorts where the two best teams of each division would go up against each other before the winning team from each division would go up against each other in the championship series.

=== ABL Eastern Division Playoff ===
(1E) New York (Original) Celtics Vs. (2E) Philadelphia Warriors: New York (Original) Celtics win series 2–0

- Game 1: March 13, 1928 @ New York: New York (Original) Celtics 27, Philadelphia Warriors 21
- Game 2: March 14, 1928 @ Philadelphia: New York (Original) Celtics 32, Philadelphia Warriors 24

=== ABL Championship Series ===
(1E) New York (Original) Celtics Vs. (1W) Fort Wayne Hoosiers: New York (Original) Celtics win series 3–1

- Game 1: March 21, 1928 @ Fort Wayne: New York (Original) Celtics 30, Fort Wayne Hoosiers 21
- Game 2: March 22, 1928 @ Fort Wayne: Fort Wayne Hoosiers 28, New York (Original) Celtics 21
- Game 3: March 23, 1928 @ Fort Wayne: New York (Original) Celtics 35, Fort Wayne Hoosiers 18
- Game 4: March 25, 1928 @ New York: New York (Original) Celtics 27, Fort Wayne Hoosiers 26

The Original Celtics would win their second straight ABL championship and third (and final) overall professional basketball (league) championship this season (though the Celtics could be listed under the New York (Original) Celtics during this specific season due to them playing officially under the New York (Original) Celtics name specifically). Interestingly, following this season's conclusion, the Original Celtics would also compete in a best-of-three championship series with the all-black New York Renaissance Hall of Fame team to determine the overall champions for the sport of basketball this season, with the Celtics defeating the Renaissance 2–1 to claim the official championship for the sport of basketball for this season to go alongside their championship that was won within the ABL, thus technically making them double champions in the sport for this season.
