= 1946–47 Troy Celtics season =

- League: American Basketball League (revived original)
- Head coach: Sam Winograd (1–9); Moe Goldman (player-coach; 0–3); Davey Banks (12–10)
- General manager: Paul Sahagian(?)
- Owner(s): Paul Sahagian
- Arena: Troy State Armory(?)

Results
- Record: 13–22 (.371)
- Place: Division: 3rd (Northern)
- Playoff finish: Did not qualify

The 1946–47 Troy Celtics season was unofficially considered the eleventh and final professional basketball season ever held by the team that was known as the Original Celtics officially, as well as the third and final season ever played by the Troy Celtics officially (with this season also being their first and only full season ever played under that name properly after previously operating as the Troy Haymakers in the late 1930s before a merger with the (original) Kingston Colonials had them become the Troy Celtics for the rest of the following season afterward, with the season after that having them start out as the Troy Celtics before later moving to Brooklyn to become the Brooklyn Celtics for the rest of that season going forward). However, there would be one more season where the Troy Celtics briefly played in the minor New York State Professional League before that league folded operations without a champion and the Celtics later ended up being purchased by Abe Saperstein to become patsies for the world-famous Harlem Globetrotters up until 1952. This season could also potentially be seen as (at least) the 32nd season of independent play as well for the overall history of the Original Celtics franchise, though it can reasonably be considered (at least) their 31st season properly due to the New York Hakoahs briefly replacing the Original Celtics entirely during the original era of the American Basketball League before it got revived in 1933 as a regional league instead of an entirely national league as the ABL had originally envisioned itself to be at the time, with it being arguable that this could actually be (at least) the 30th season properly due to the Troy Haymakers' only full season not truly counting as an Original Celtics season properly. In any case, Paul Sahagian would decide to bring back the Original Celtics moniker for the Troy Celtics name following the conclusion of World War II, with the high amount of teams participating in the revived American Basketball League leading to the ABL having their second ever season (first and only season in the revived ABL if one doesn't include the 1927–28 season from the original American Basketball League into the overall league's history) competing in a divisional format for its regular season of play (though it would involve teams competing in the Northern and Southern divisions instead of the Eastern and Western Divisions there, with Troy competing in the Northern division in the process). Incidentally, this season would also be the very same season where the original owner of the Original Celtics franchise, Jim Furey, would allow for the owner of the Boston Celtics within the newly created Basketball Association of America (at the time) to use the Celtics name for the Boston franchise (for a fee of $1,000) for the rest of their existence going forward in that league, with the Boston Celtics still existing in the present day as a successful franchise in the National Basketball Association.

Unlike the Celtics' most recent season they had participated in the ABL before departing from the league in 1941 (in part due to World War II), the Troy Celtics would have a very poor 1–12 record to start out the season where they would return into the ABL (in a time where the people there would decide to have the league act more like a league where they'd only primarily operate on the weekends instead of going on throughout the week like the rivaling National Basketball League and the newly-created Basketball Association of America, which would ultimately start the downfall of the original ABL's reputation as a professional basketball league). The poor record would be utilized in part by having the likes of head coach Sam Winograd and then player-coach Moe Goldman not helping the team out under a coaching point of view. However, following the poor early start to the season, the Celtics would hire former Chicago American Gears head coach Davey Banks to try and help course correct their situation throughout the rest of the season, which he would do to a certain extent. While Davey Banks would have the Troy Celtics get an above-average 12–10 record to help improve their status within the ABL by the time he arrived as their new head coach, ultimately, it would be a case of too little, too late happening for the team, as the Celtics would still wind up having a below-average 13–22 to end the regular season. While the Celtics did end up finishing the season with a third place result in the Northern Division (behind only the Jersey City Atoms by one extra game that Jersey City won and the Brooklyn Gothams in their division), Troy would ultimately fail to qualify in the newly-crafted ABL Playoffs that had a formatting of six teams competing throughout the event to eventually crown the champion; while they were the third place team in the Northern Division, due to the way the ABL crafted their playoff system to determine who would qualify (which involved the two best teams from each division and the two other best teams after them, regardless of divisional placement), the lower record of the Troy Celtics would not be enough for them to overcome either the below-average Elizabeth Braves or the eventual (controversial) champions in the Trenton Tigers (who had an average 17–17 record for their season) for the final two playoff spots for the season. This would officially end up becoming the final professional basketball season ever held by any team that was officially or spiritually connected to the Original Celtics franchise as a whole (outside of a brief stint where they would only briefly appear in the semi-pro/minor professional basketball league known as the New York State Professional League before deciding to drop out of that league early on into that season of play). Following the poor results held from the ABL and the team dealing with increasing woes from trying to succeed as a barnstorming franchise in the 1940s when compared to their previous decades of successful play, the (Original) / Troy Celtics franchise would end up being sold off to Abe Saperstein in 1949 to essentially become patsies for his world-famous (all-black) Harlem Globetrotters to go up against in future years of play (similar to what would eventually happen to some other famous (formerly) successful basketball teams of the time like the Jewish-based Philadelphia Sphas and the all-black New York Renaissance), with the last game that would potentially be played by the Celtics occurring some time in 1952 against the Harlem Globetrotters. This season's team would also feature a future mob figure and boxing promoter being on the team in Irving Resnick as a part of their rather large roster for this season of play, with Resnick surprisingly being the leading scorer of the entire ABL this time around.

== Roster ==
Due to information on American Basketball League players being generally hard to find, there are bound to be more gaps and/or inaccuracies found in certain areas on the team's roster spots than usual.

1946–47 Troy Celtics roster
Players

| Pos. | No. | Player | Height | Weight | DOB | From |
|---|---|---|---|---|---|---|
| | | Neil Abbatiello | | | 1922-08-26 | Gorton HS (NY) |
| G | | Sid Blair | 6 ft 0 in (1.83 m) | 200 lb (91 kg) | 1917? | No college |
| | | Marv Blumenthal | | | 1924-05-30 | Temple |
| | | Johnny Cerrone | | | 1918-11-18 | Columbia |
| | | Joe Dinkwoods | | | 1917-01-21 | St. Francis College |
| G | | Larry Dodick | 5 ft 8 in (1.73 m) | 155 lb (70 kg) | 1914-08-15 | No college |
| G | | Norm Drucker | 5 ft 10 in (1.78 m) | | 1920-07-04 | CCNY |
| G/F | | Moe Dubilier | 6 ft 2 in (1.88 m) | 210 lb (95 kg) | 1915-02-20 | John Marshall University |
| | | Chili Edelstein | | | 1923-03-16 | Long Island |
| F/C | | Tom Flanagan | 6 ft 1 in (1.85 m) | 165 lb (75 kg) | 1916-07-18 | No college |
| G/F | | Moe Frankel | 5 ft 10 in (1.78 m) | 190 lb (86 kg) | 1913-01-25 | No college |
| G | | Nat Frankel | 5 ft 8 in (1.73 m) | 150 lb (68 kg) | 1909-10-19 | Brooklyn College |
| F/C | | Moe Goldman | 6 ft 3 in (1.91 m) | 175 lb (79 kg) | 1913-05-30 | CCNY |
| | | Ed Golub | | | 1922-12-25 | St. John's |
| | | Bill E. Henry | | | 1924-05-23 | No college |
| G/F | | Hal Judenfriend | 5 ft 10 in (1.78 m) | 155 lb (70 kg) | 1920-05-04 | CCNY |
| G | | Jules Kasner | 6 ft 1 in (1.85 m) | 170 lb (77 kg) | 1917-10-23 | Long Island |
| | | Bill Kobler | | | Unknown | St. John's |
| C | | Hal Korovin | 6 ft 5 in (1.96 m) | 205 lb (93 kg) | 1925-04-19 | CCNY |
| F | | Ben Kramer | 6 ft 1 in (1.85 m) | 195 lb (88 kg) | 1913-05-03 | Long Island |
| | | Charlie Lacina | | | 1922-03-22 | St. John's |
| | | Dave Laub | | | 1921-04-07 | CCNY |
| G | | Tony Orlando | 5 ft 11 in (1.80 m) | 170 lb (77 kg) | 1923-06-10 | Hofstra |
| G | | Joe Polcha | 5 ft 11 in (1.80 m) | 170 lb (77 kg) | 1917-02-24 | No college |
| G/F | | Len Rader | 6 ft 1 in (1.85 m) | 185 lb (84 kg) | 1921-03-29 | Long Island |
| F | | Irving Resnick | 6 ft 1 in (1.85 m) | 210 lb (95 kg) | 1916-03-06 | NYU |
| | | Luke Sapan | | | 1920-07-12 | Long Island |
| | | Bob Scheer | | | 1923-04-19 | CCNY |
| | | Marty Scheinkman | | | 1920-04-20 | CCNY |
| C | | Red Stevens | 6 ft 4 in (1.93 m) | 175 lb (79 kg) | 1917-12-11 | NYU |

Coaches
Head coach

Sam Winograd (fired)
Moe Goldman (interim)
Davey Banks

Legend
- (DP) Unsigned draft pick
- (FA) Free agent
- (S) Suspended
- Injured

== American Basketball League Standings ==
Due to the number of teams in the ABL this season, this would mark the first time since the 1927–28 season (which the Celtics technically competed in) where the ABL would utilize divisions within their league in a proper manner, though unlike that season, the ABL would utilize a Northern Division (which the Celtics competed in) and a Southern Division instead of the typical Eastern Division and Western Division that had been on display for most other professional leagues at the time.

=== Northern Division ===
| Pos. | Team | Wins | Losses | Win % |
|---|---|---|---|---|
| 1 | Brooklyn Gothams - y | 24 | 10 | .706 |
| 2 | Jersey City Atoms - x | 14 | 22 | .389 |
| 3 | Troy Celtics | 13 | 22 | .371 |
| 4 | Paterson Crescents | 11 | 23 | .324 |
| 5 | Newark Bobcats / Kingston Chiefs / Yonkers Chiefs^{a} † | 7 | 17 | .292 |

† – Did not survive the ABL season.

=== Southern Division ===
| Pos. | Team | Wins | Losses | Win % |
|---|---|---|---|---|
| 1 | Baltimore Bullets - z | 31 | 3 | .912 |
| 2 | Philadelphia SPHAs - x | 19 | 14 | .675 |
| 3 | Trenton Tigers - x | 17 | 17 | .500 |
| 4 | Elizabeth Braves - x | 15 | 18 | .455 |
| 5 | Wilmington Bombers | 15 | 20 | .429 |

== Awards and honors ==
By the end of the season, Irving Resnick would end up being the leading scorer of the entire league for the fourteenth season of its return and its twentieth overall season of its existence with 563 points scored for an average of 16.1 points per game. The 563 points scored by Resnick that season would be the most points scored by a played in a season within the ABL at the time.

== Notes ==
^{a} The Newark Bobcats first transferred their franchise from Newark, New Jersey to Kingston, New York on December 23, 1946 (though they did not necessarily change their team name at the time (but if they did, they would have changed it to the Kingston Chiefs instead)) and then moved to nearby Yonkers, New York to become the Yonkers Chiefs on January 22, 1947, before folding operations entirely by the middle of February in 1947.
