= Original Celtics =

Former basketball team in New York

New York Original Celtics
- Leagues: Eastern Basketball League (1921–1923); Metropolitan Basketball League (1922–1923); National Basketball League (1926); American Basketball League (1926–1930; 1937–1941; 1946–1947)
- Founded: 1914; 112 years ago
- Folded: 1930; 96 years ago 1952; 74 years ago?
- Arena: Amsterdam Opera House, West 44th Street (1916–17); Century Theatre (1918–19); Madison Square Garden II (1921–22); Steel Pier (1922); 71st Regiment Armory (1923–1926); Arcola Park (1926); Arcadia Hall (1926–27); Madison Square Garden III (1927–28); Jamaica Arena (1929); New York Hippodrome (1937–38)
- Team colors: Green, yellow

The Original Celtics were a barnstorming professional American basketball team whose overall franchise history is considered to be very complex due to them operating throughout their overall existence under different owners, locales, team names, and even teams in general at certain points in time. During their various points in existence, the team played professional basketball games out in the Eastern Basketball League, the Metropolitan Basketball League, the 1926 rendition of the National Basketball League, and the (original) American Basketball League, with their time in the ABL being their most notable time in terms of professional basketball operations. The team has no relation to the NBA's Boston Celtics outside of them being an indirect inspiration for that successful franchise. The Original Celtics franchise as a whole was inducted into the Naismith Memorial Basketball Hall of Fame in 1959.

== Early years ==
The team's roots laid out as a local amateur team named the New York Celtics team that was created in Hell's Kitchen, Manhattan by Frank "Tip" McCormack during the 1914–15 season (who were considered a "third-rate team" within the neighborhood of Hudson Guild and Hell's Kitchen at the time with players being local neighborhood boys under the management of McCormack that fit the local Irish descent of the population of New York City time, with their 1916–17 semipro season resulting in the New York Celtics getting a 31–10–1 record (including a 29–17 loss against the professional Newark Turners from the Interstate League)) that disbanded during the 1917–18 season due to World War I. In 1918, James A. Furey, a cousin of Frank McCormack, alongside his brother, Thomas Furey, assembled their own team around a nucleus of those truly "original" Celtics, adding other players mostly from the West Side of New York City (which ended up becoming the best basketball players of their day during that period of time), with James defiantly calling his new squad the Original Celtics after McCormack ultimately decided he didn't want to lose control of his New York Celtics team to James and Thomas Furey. In their opening season under the Original Celtics name, the team had a good win/loss record while playing all of their games at the Century Theatre in Manhattan, with them going 65–4 during the 1919 year (likely due to them playing their games during the weekends back when professional basketball leagues were willing to play on the weekdays at the sacrifice of consistent quality of play) while continually drawing an average of 4,000 people to home games (partially due to the draw of having people dance after the games were finished, especially during the Prohibition era). Near the end of the 1920–21 season, the Celtics would compete in a best-of-three independent championship series against the New York Whirlwinds team owned by Tex Rickard (and later by Charles Brickley), but it would never be completed after the Whirlwinds won Game 1 40–27 (though some outlets listed the final as 40–29 instead) at the 71st Regiment Armory under amateur basketball rules of the time and the Celtics won Game 2 26–24 at the 69th Regiment Armory under professional basketball rules for the time due to a potential combination of reasons including the fear of rioting fans, the lack of agreement on money, and both Nat Holman and Jim Furey looking to avert the possibility of certain gamblers looking to fix Game 3 since there was no confirmed reason for why the series was never completed properly. Initially, outside of their original point of existence, they played in various struggling professional leagues, winning the Eastern Basketball League's championship after winning the second half of the 1921–22 EBL season following a late first half introduction from two teams folding (which would unfortunately be seen with the tragic passing of guard Ernie Reich during the season due to an awful case of pneumonia) and then being undefeated in the Metropolitan Basketball League in the following season with a perfect first half of the season there before becoming primarily a touring squad like they had been back in their early history, which involved them traveling up to 150,000 miles a year while completing a 102–205 game schedule. Despite those seemingly insurmountable odds, they notably won about ninety percent of their games throughout their history and finished their 1922–23 season with an unbelievable record of 193–11–1, including having an official 17–1 record in league games played that season. When hoping to claim an undisputed national championship, they challenged the nationally famous Franklin Wonder Five high school team, but the Franklin coach refused as his team "was too tired" after a grueling year of play on their ends. With the players having generous salaries for the sport (reportedly being earned up to an incredibly high for the time $10,000 per season) while also being able to travel as far out as the state of Wisconsin at times, they would continue having very successful seasons (averaging around five victories for every six games played on their ends, with victories often going over 20-30 points, with only one reported victory being over 50 points since the less route-based victories would result in the Celtics being welcomed back more properly the next time they entered certain territories when compared to the routes the Buffalo Germans sometimes gave their opponents), with the 1923–24 season resulting in a 134–6–1 record (with the sole tie being a 32–32 tie to the Mount Vernon squad that presumably didn't want to pay Jim Furey for a chance to win in overtime), the 1924–25 season would (presumably) see the Celtics lose only six total games (notably going 67–4 against future ABL teams), and the 1925–26 season seeing the Celtics go 90–12 in games played when combining their long stretch of miles traveled with ABL teams being in mind.

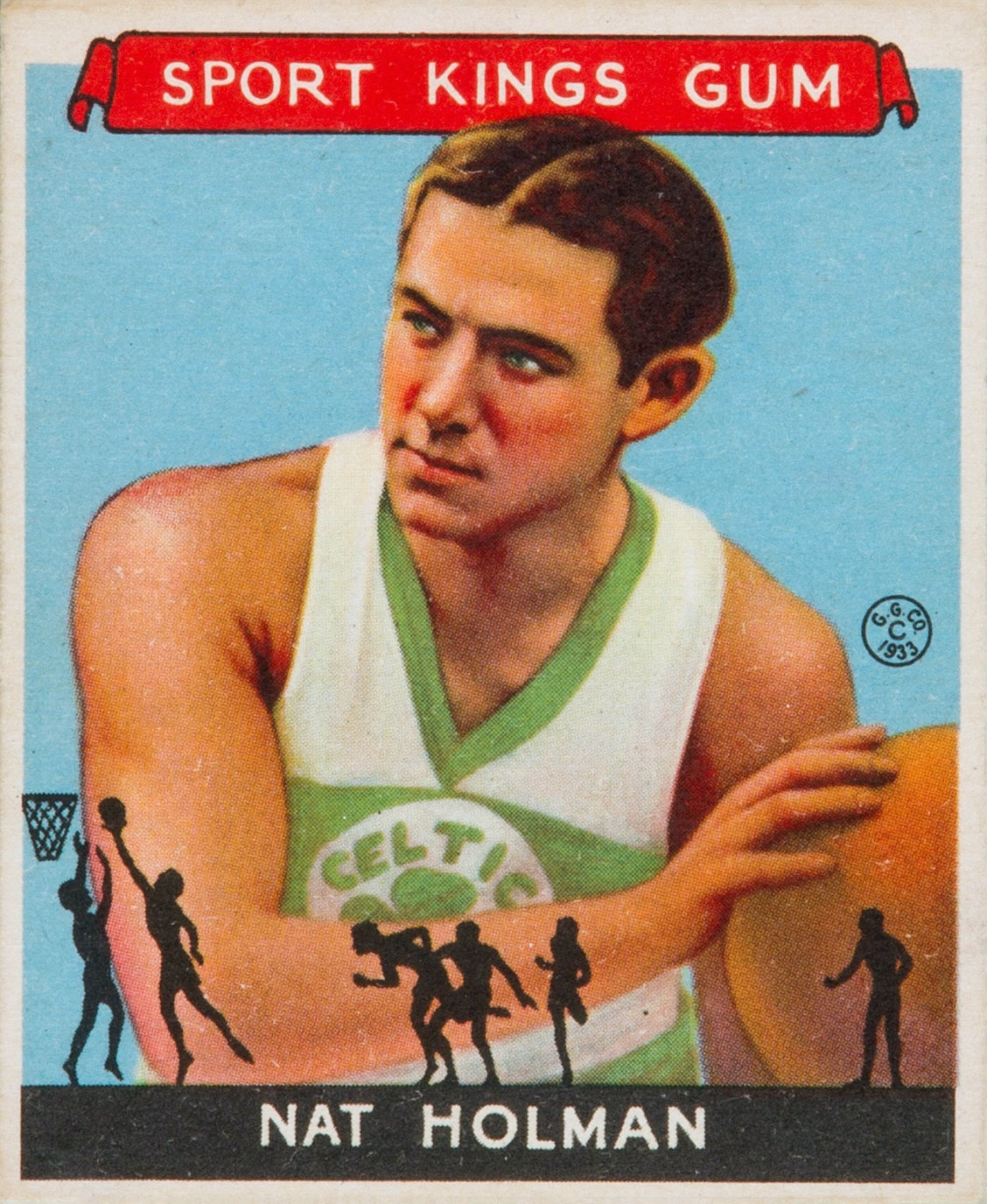
Nat Holman as displayed upon a Goudey "Sport Kings Gum" trading card. (Both Joe Lapchick (spelled as Joe Lopchick) and Eddie Burke had similar player cards displayed as well for the Original Celtics, with one other Hall of Fame worthy basketball player from an earlier era of the sport named Ed Wachter joining them in the same set that Holman appeared in.)

The team's first dominant player was "Dutch" Dehnert, a 6 ft 1 in (1.85 m) standing guard where some people like author Murry R. Nelson credit with introducing the modern concept of pivot play. When ballhandling wizard Nat Holman (later to coach national championship teams at CCNY) was signed to play for then-head coach John Whitty in 1922, the Original Celtics truly hit their stride as a franchise. One key factor in helping secure players like them for their long-term dominance as a franchise was the fact that they were one of the first basketball teams, if not the very first basketball team, to utilize professional contracts to ensure both good payment for their players after the amount of games they played throughout an entire season and to keep them out of team jumping throughout a regular basis (which was a problem for the sport's early history of professional play, as noted by Ed Wachter's history as a player).

During the 1921–22 season, the team replaced both the financially unstable Harrisburg Club and the New York Giants, with the owner of the latter team also owning the New York Whirlwinds during the first half of that season. During the 1922–23 season, the team took over the Atlantic City Sandpipers franchise when that franchise was 2–9 and won five out of six games there before the Eastern Basketball League folded operations itself by January 5, 1923. They also competed in the Metropolitan Basketball League as well, but dropped out of the league during the first half after going 12–0, likely seeing themselves as too good to compete in that league following that period of time. During a brief period of time in the 1922–23 season, the Original Celtics also temporarily moved to Atlantic City, New Jersey to become the Atlantic City Celtics, but ultimately moved back to the New York City area and brought back their Original Celtics name again after having poor draws when playing in Atlantic City instead of in the boroughs of New York City. Following that season's conclusion, the Original Celtics would rent out the 71st Regiment Armory out in Manhattan on Sundays to play as the home team for independent matches from 1923 up until 1926.

Other outstanding individual players on these squads were another "big man", Joe Lapchick; John Beckman, who was called the "Babe Ruth of Basketball"; George "Horse" Haggerty; John "Pete" Barry; and the speedy Davey Banks, who would later be named an honorable mention member for the "All-Time Stars of Professional Basketball Team" that had been created by the National Basketball League, a future predecessor to the present-day National Basketball Association, during the 1944–45 NBL season. Other players that were a part of the Original Celtics franchise that would be listed as a part of that "All-Time Stars of Professional Basketball Team" (either for the first team, second team, or as an honorable mention) alongside Banks included Bennie Borgmann, Joe Lapchick, John Beckman, Nat Holman, Dutch Dehnert, and (debatably due to the late team history being in mind) Nat Hickey and Bobby McDermott.

== 1926–1930: ABL success ==
During the summer of 1926, the team owners of the American Basketball League that were meeting up with each other were generally pleased by the results of the league's inaugural session. Following the expulsion of the Boston Whirlwinds by the end of the first half of that season due to a dispute over player contracts, only the Buffalo Bisons had decided to not sign up for the second season there. Not only that, but league president Joseph Carr had signed three new members to help expand the league for their goal of having the ABL become a national basketball league with new teams in Baltimore, New York, and Philadelphia. The latter two were of particular importance to the league's credibility. Two Philadelphia boxing promoters, Jules Aronson and Max Hoff were recruited by Carr to finance the team and Philadelphia Sphas team owner Eddie Gottlieb was hired to run the team, which originally was named the Philadelphia Quakers before later being rebranded as the Philadelphia Warriors by the second half of the season. However, the situation in New York was considerably less clear than what was going on out in Philadelphia. The Original Celtics franchise were originally signed to represent the state of New York, but they were reluctant recruits, at best. After the previous season, Carr had banned any ABL team from playing games against the Original Celtics, thus drying up some of their most lucrative exhibition dates in the process. Such a tactic would not have intimidated the Celtics in the past, but they were already dealing with financial stress due to the June indictment of owner Jim Furey for embezzling $187,000 from a New York department store business that he was a major part of at the time called the Arnold Constable Corporation.

Then, in early October, just a month before the ABL season was supposed to get underway, the Celtics bolted to the newly organized National Basketball League (which was not related to the NBL that would eventually become a predecessor to the present-day NBA). That new league operated solely in and around the metropolitan New York City, but despite its geographical limitations was stocked with some of the best players in the country. After pulling off a coup by signing the Original Celtics away from the ABL, the NBL brashly raided the ABL's rosters for additional players into their league as well.

The Brooklyn Arcadians were particularly hard hit, losing stars Red Conaty and Rody Cooney, while the Washington Palace Five lost starters Teddy Kearns and Bob Grody. Washington owner George Preston Marshall later completed the destruction of the Arcadians by luring Elmer Ripley and Tillie Voss away from the Brooklyn club to fill the gaps in his lineup left by the National Basketball League's raids. The newcomers joined Rusty Saunders, Ray Kennedy and George Glasco in an attempt to help restore Marshall's Palace Five club to its place among the ABL preseason favorites. Meanwhile, the Cleveland Rosenblums returned to the ABL with their championship squad intact and further strengthened by the addition of Ohio State rookie Cookie Cunningham and valuable swingman Gil Ely. With the Brooklyn Arcadians now being out of the picture, Gottlieb's new Philadelphia team entering the ABL became the third contender in the process. The Quakers (later known as the Warriors) showcased a Who's Who of former Eastern Basketball League stars including George Artus, Tom Barlow, Stretch Meehan, Soup Campbell, and fellow Sphas co-owner Herman "Chickie" Passon.

Three weeks into the new season, the favorites were all performing up to expectations, but the league had serious problems at the other end of the standings. Brooklyn, Detroit and Baltimore were all winless and showing few signs of improvement. President Carr acted quickly and ruthlessly to solve the dilemma. First, he moved to destroy the foundation of the upstart National Basketball League by secretly negotiating with the Original Celtics to jump up from the NBL to the ABL. As anticipated, the Celtics' departure triggered an immediate collapse of the rivaling league. Next, Carr expelled both the Detroit Pulaski Post Five / Lions and Brooklyn Arcadians clubs from the ABL, and then awarded the latter franchise's position to the incoming Celtics (with the Celtics temporarily taking on the Brooklyn Celtics moniker during the rest of that season within the ABL in the process). Finally, he helped bolster the Baltimore Orioles franchise with players from the suddenly defunct NBL. In a single stroke, Carr had signed basketball's most famous team, thwarted the upstart NBL, and provided his league with an additional pool of dozens of top players to help themselves out (though Baltimore still were failing to succeed during the first half of the season in particular).

The Original Celtics quickly waded into the race for first-half honors of the ABL, winning 13 of 16 games, but the 0–5 starting record they were forced to inherit from the Arcadians was ultimately impossible for the Celtics to overcome in the end. Cleveland captured first place by one game over Washington, with Philadelphia in third and the Celtics in fourth place. Starting the second half of the season with a fresh slate (working only with the Brooklyn Celtics name with nothing else holding them back this time around), the Celtics quickly took charge of the second half of the season with nine straight victories. Fort Wayne, which had been a major beneficiary at the middle of the season from the National League's players, finished second. The most important addition to the Indiana club was Bennie Borgmann, who quickly established him as the league's premier offensive star. Washington and Philadelphia followed in third and fourth place respectively, while first-half winner Cleveland slumped badly to fifth place. Cleveland's fall was precipitated by the hasty mid-season departure of star guard Honey Russell, who was exiled to the Chicago Bruins after a disagreement with team owner Max Rosenblum. The Celtics easily disposed of the weakened Cleveland team in three straight games to take the ABL championship.

In 1926, the American Basketball League, developed in part by sports entrepreneur George Preston Marshall, effectively railroaded the team into joining its ranks by prohibiting member teams from playing against them. The Original Celtics responded by winning the next two ABL titles (first as the Brooklyn Celtics and then under their New York (Original) Celtics name the following season afterward when the ABL decided to (temporarily) ditch the split season format for two divisions with four teams each competing in one regular season for an equivalent of a modern-day playoff format of sorts). During their first (and technically only) full season in the ABL, their dominance was so absolute that fans in other cities took up the cry, "Break up the Celtics!" In response, the league disbanded the Celtics (which was exacerbated by Jim Furey's imprisonment at the Sing Sing Correctional Facility for embezzlement) and apportioned their players to the other teams going forward (though it's suggested the franchise would temporarily play under the New York Hakoahs name during that brief period of time instead before Furey regained control of the Original Celtics team once again). The strategy ultimately backfired as game attendance started to plummet, and after being further deflated some time later on due to the long-term effects of the Great Depression, the ABL folded its original operations after the 1931 season, though they would end up reviving operations two years later in 1933 under more a more strictly regional basis going forward by that point in time instead.

During the 1926–27 season, the team replaced the Brooklyn Arcadians / Rockets after five games (all of which were losses) and took on the Brooklyn Celtics name for just this season only. By the next season, they had returned to their original New York Celtics name (though they were also sometimes referred to as the New York Original Celtics (sometimes with parentheses around the word "Original") by that point in time as well). After winning back-to-back ABL championships in 1926–27 and 1927–28, the team was broken up and defunct for a season, with their spot in the ABL being replaced by the New York Hakoahs, a (mostly) Jewish basketball team that would contain two of those Original Celtics players in question in Davey Banks and (new) player-coach Nat Holman. Once the Celtics came back and replaced the Hakoahs as the representative team for the state of New York, an attempt to revive the team as ABL champions for the 1929–30 season that featured Banks and Holman alongside John Beckman from the original era of teams ultimately failed early on into the first half of that season, which led to them dropping out of the league during the first half of that split season on December 10, 1929. While they would still end up winning another World Championship tournament during that period of time in spite of having all of their best players essentially going to the Cleveland Rosenblums (and other ABL teams), the effects of the Great Depression would lead to Jim Furey folding the Original Celtics franchise by 1930 due to him being unable to further fund the club going forward. It's after this point in time where the team's history truly starts to get messy, as Max Rosenblum from the Cleveland Rosenblums would first try and revive the Original Celtics starting in the 1931–32 season by rebranding the team as the "Rosenblum Celtics" (albeit dealing with lesser payment results in relation to the Great Depression) before it eventually failed due to the long-term effects of the Great Depression also. A few years later, the team, now being sponsored by popular singer Kate Smith and talent manager Ted Collins, reinstated the Original Celtics under that specific name, and had them play in the ABL once again in the second half of the 1936–37 season and the entire 1937–38 season as the New York Celtics (with that specific team name sometimes having the updated team moniker of the "New York Kate Smith Celtics" in mind in order to help distinguish themselves from the famous Original Celtics era of the late 1910s and 1920s decade), as well in the 1938–39 season as the Troy Haymakers (though they later participated in the inaugural 1939 World Professional Basketball Tournament as the Troy Celtics instead) and briefly in the 1939–40 season as the Troy Haymakers before becoming the Troy Celtics (who finished the season in second place for the ABL's round-robin tournament behind the Philadelphia Sphas) due to them merging operations with the Kingston Colonials (who previously were the best team in terms of overall records that previous season who also might have potentially been related to another Celtics franchise operated by Max Rosenblum out in Kingston, New York?), then briefly in the 1940–41 season as the Troy Celtics once again before becoming the Brooklyn Celtics for the rest of that season (with that season having them win the second half of the season, but losing the ABL championship to the Philadelphia Sphas once again) before eventually ending their ABL tenure in the 1946–47 season (under new ownership through Paul Sahagian) as the Troy Celtics after previously dealing with behind the scenes issues during the World War II era. The Celtics would briefly try to play one more professional season of sorts in the minor league New York State Basketball League in the 1948–49 season under the Troy Celtics name as well, but they would only play for four total games there before leaving that league and essentially get sold off to Abe Saperstein soon afterward.

When the remaining surviving Original Celtics players from the 1960s were interviewed to see if they could compete against teams from the modern-era (of that time period) within the NBA in particular if they were suddenly young men again, the players felt that the team itself could not compete against teams like those in that era due to rule changes and both guards and centers alike being completely different from what they were in the era they competed in (alongside the fact that the sport of basketball as a whole would be completely different from the way basketball was back when they first competed in their own era), but they as individuals could likely compete against the best of the best from that time as players on their own accord. As such, any comparison of the Original Celtics to teams in the modern-day era of basketball could reasonably be seen as hollow at best and next to impossible to convey properly in a worst case scenario. However, the way the Original Celtics played the sport of basketball during that time period could be seen as the earliest blueprint possible for that team's historical mark to land beyond the scope of the sport as a whole due to how much of their style of play could still be seen while entering the 21st century into the present-day era of basketball.

== Mid-1930s–Mid-1940s: Traveling Team ==
The Original Celtics briefly reorganized as a barnstorming team in the 1930s, but never replicated their initial glory. They would continue playing as a barnstorming team (sometimes under names like the Troy Celtics, the New York Celtics, and the Brooklyn Celtics) and even briefly returned to the since-revived American Basketball League up until 1947, which would be the last known season where the Celtics would play as a franchise. Allegedly, there would be Celtics teams created by Max Rosenblum like the Rosenblum Celtics and the Kingston (New Jersey) Celtics (who might have also been the Kingston Colonials and/or New York Celtics?) that tried to continue the legacy that the Original Celtics franchise held during their history as well, but those teams would end up folding by the 1930s and early 1940s due to the long-term effects of the Great Depression and the start of World War II as well. Before the Celtics tried one more time to enter the ABL under ownership held by Paul Sahagian, another brief attempt was held during World War II to revive the team by John "Pete" Barry as a barnstorming team, though it's not known what kind of results were held during that specific time. Following the final professional season of play the Celtics had as a franchise, Paul Sahagian would have the Celtics move back to New York to (likely) return to their Original Celtics name one more time as a barnstorming team for good, with this team notably defeating the world-famous Harlem Globetrotters and even having center George Mikan briefly playing for them during this period of time as well. However, the Original Celtics would end up being purchased (potentially from Paul Sahagian) by Abe Saperstein (similar to what would happen to the historically Jewish Philadelphia Sphas and all-black New York Renaissance franchises) for the Harlem Globetrotters to utilize as patsies in what would be seen as scripted games against the Globetrotters, with the Original Celtics' final game ever played (presumably speaking) being an outdoor doubleheader series of sorts held at the Korakuen Stadium within Japan back on September 14, 1952 while collaborating with the Globetrotters franchise; while the Celtics would technically win the first game played over the Japan All-Stars alongside the Harlem franchise (the Celtics would score more points in the first half than the Japanese team throughout the entire season while playing in the first half of that game 32–12 first half score, while the Harlem Globetrotters took over for the second half to essentially do the same thing with a 24–8 second half score to get a combined final score of 56–20 in a collaborative victory of sorts for what could be considered the final victory the franchise ever had), their second (and what would later be (potentially considered) their final) match saw the Celtics ultimately get blown out by the Harlem Globetrotters in a brutal 41–16 defeat with 25,000 attending that night.

== Later inspiration for the Boston Celtics ==
During the creation period of the Basketball Association of America (later National Basketball Association) in 1946, when Walter A. Brown was deciding to name his new professional basketball franchise for the city of Boston, he decided upon the name of the Celtics over names like Whirlwinds (which had its own brief, albeit tumultuous history of existence within the (original) American Basketball League), Unicorns, and Olympics due in part to him wanting to grab the attention of the city's large Irish American population. However, in order for Brown to actually gain the rights to have the Celtics become the team name for his new franchise, he had to pay James Furey a licensing fee of sorts (one that was slated to be worth $1,000) to allow the Boston franchise to use the Celtics name going forward there. Coincidentally, the Boston Celtics' own creation would be the same season where the Troy Celtics (a team that's considered to be connected to the Original Celtics franchise) would have their final season of play as a franchise within the revived version of the American Basketball League, as financial issues on that team's end combined with the ABL having a decreasing reputation over its predecessors of the time in the rivaling National Basketball League (which was not related to the NBL that the Original Celtics had briefly played for in 1926) and the aforementioned Basketball Association of America led to the Troy Celtics not just leaving the ABL, but eventually seeing a decline that resorted to them being sold off to Abe Saperstein for the Harlem Globetrotters to compete against whenever they wanted to do so. As for the Boston franchise in question, after early financial losses in their first few seasons within the BAA/NBA, the Boston Celtics would continue to exist in the present day as one of the most successful professional basketball franchises in the modern day era.

== Year-by-year ==
Year	League	Reg. season	Playoffs
1921–22	EBL	1st (2nd half)	Champions
1922–23	EBL	4th (1st half)	N/A
1922–23	MBL	1st (1st half)	N/A
1926–27	NBL	1st	N/A
1926–27	ABL	4th (1st half); 1st (2nd half)	Champions
1927–28	ABL	1st, Eastern	Champions
1929–30	ABL	N/A	N/A
1936–37	ABL	4th (2nd half)	N/A
1937–38	ABL	5th (both halves)	N/A
1939–40	ABL	3rd	2nd in Round-Robin Championship Tournament
1940–41	ABL	4th (1st half); 1st (2nd half)	Finals
1946–47	ABL	3rd, Northern	N/A

== Notable players ==
Notable players with the Original Celtics include the following listed from the 1919–1928 rosters:

- Davey Banks (1901–1952), died prematurely due to a car accident he was in
- John "Pete" Barry (1896–1968)
- John Beckman (1895–1968)
- Bennie Borgmann (1898–1978)
- Eddie Burke (1894–1969)
- Shang Chadwick (1901–1973)
- Dutch Dehnert (1898–1979)
- Joe Dreyfus (1892–1974)
- Swede Grimstead (1891–1934), died prematurely due to lung disease
- George "Horse" Haggerty (1891–1961)
- Bob Hilbert (1899–1986)
- Nat Holman (1896–1995)
- Joe Lapchick (1900–1970)
- Chris Leonard (1890–1957)
- Ernie Reich (1892–1922), died prematurely during his playing career with the Celtics due to pneumonia
- Elmer Ripley (1891–1982)
- Mike Smolick (1890–1964)
- Joe Trippe (1897–1954)
- Eddie White (1894–1953)
- Johnny Whitty (1896–1965)

Other notable players that weren't on those listed rosters include the following listed here:

- Lou Bender (1910–2009), pioneer player with the Columbia Lions and in early pro basketball, who was later a successful trial attorney.
- Paul Birch (1910–1982)
- Jim Brown (1912–1991)
- Jerry Bush (1914–1976)
- George Chestnut (1911–1983)
- Rody Cooney (1902–1965)
- Nat Hickey (1902–1979)
- Mel Hirsch (1921–1968)
- Carl Husta (1902–1951)
- Al Kellett (1901–1960)
- Ben Kramer (1913–1999)
- Bobby McDermott (1914–1963)
- Bill McElwain (1905–1981)
- George Mikan (1924–2005)
- Ed Melvin (1916–2004)
- Chick Reiser (1914–1996)
- Ash Resnick (1916–1989), mob figure
- Harry Riconda (1897–1958), professional baseball player
- Honey Russell (1902–1973)
- Moe Spahn (1912–1991)
- Bob Synnott (1912–1985)
- Ed Wineapple (1905–1996)

== Trophies ==
- Eastern Basketball League: 1 (1922)
- American Basketball League: 2 (1927, 1928)
