= Jim Brown (basketball) =

American basketball and baseball player

Personal information
- Born: June 13, 1912
- Died: January 6, 1991 (aged 78)
- Listed height: 6 ft 3 in (1.91 m)
- Listed weight: 205 lb (93 kg)

Career information
- High school: Southern (Philadelphia, Pennsylvania)
- College: Temple (1932–1935)
- Playing career: 1935–19??
- Position: Guard / forward

Career history
- 193?–1940: Original Celtics
- 1940: Detroit Eagles

Career highlights
- WPBT champion (1941); 2× All-EIBL (1934, 1935); Honorable mention All-American (1935)

James T. Brown (June 13, 1912 – January 6, 1991) was an American professional basketball and baseball player in the 1930s and 1940s. In basketball, he played for the Original Celtics and Detroit Eagles. A native of Philadelphia, Pennsylvania, Brown was a star athlete at Temple University, earning three varsity letters in each basketball and basketball. In basketball, he twice earned all-conference honors while also leading the Eastern Intercollegiate Basketball League in scoring as a senior in 1934–35. He earned several All-America accolades that year as well. In baseball, Brown held a career batting average of .340 and once hit three home runs in one game.

Upon graduation in 1935, Brown pursued professional careers in both sports. After some time with the Original Celtics, in 1940 he signed to play for the Detroit Eagles in the National Basketball League. After the NBL season ended, he helped lead the Eagles to the World Professional Basketball Tournament championship in Chicago, Illinois, one of the most prestigious basketball tournaments in its era.

In 1977, Temple University inducted Brown into their athletics hall of fame.
