= 1939 World Professional Basketball Tournament =

World Professional Basketball Tournament
- 1939

Tournament information
- Location: Chicago, Illinois
- Dates: 26 March–28 March
- Venue(s): Madison Street Armory, Chicago Coliseum
- Teams: 11

Final positions
- Champions: New York Renaissance
- 1st runner-up: Oshkosh All-Stars
- 2nd runner-up: Harlem Globetrotters
- MVP: Puggy Bell

The 1939 World Professional Basketball Tournament was the first edition of the World Professional Basketball Tournament. It was held in Chicago, Illinois, during the days of 26–28 March 1939 and featured 11 teams who were mostly independently run alongside both the Oshkosh All-Stars and Sheboygan Red Skins of the National Basketball League and the Troy Celtics of the American Basketball League competing for a prize money of $10,000, which was later revealed to be a $1,000 prize given to each player on the winning team. Originally, the Philadelphia Sphas of the ABL were supposed to have been invited to the inaugural tournament, but they ultimately cancelled their invitation due to multiple injuries to their players entering the tournament this year, which led to the Illinois Grads from nearby Champaign, Illinois taking their spot instead. Because of the awkward formatting for this year's tournament with the odd number of teams competing, this led to the independently ran Chicago Harmons and New York Renaissance alongside the ABL's Troy Celtics receiving first round byes in the tournament, while the NBL's Oshkosh All-Stars received a quarterfinal bye following their first round victory over the independently ran Clarksburg Oil team from West Virginia. The upper half of the quarterfinals involved teams that were originally based in Chicago (the world famous Harlem Globetrotters originally started out in Chicago) competing against each other and teams based in New York competing against each other, while the lower half of the quarterfinals featured the three teams that remained in professional leagues at the time in the NBL & ABL. The highlight game of the tournament involved the match between the New York Renaissance and the Harlem Globetrotters in the semifinal round, which saw the Renaissance control the game for most of the match until the moment when Harlem scored six straight points to cut New York's lead down to two, though the Renaissance would tighten up their defense in order to win 27–23 over the Globetrotters. The inaugural WPBT tournament was won by the independently ran New York Renaissance, who defeated the NBL's Oshkosh All-Stars 34–25 in the title game. The Harlem Globetrotters came in third after beating the Sheboygan Red Skins 36–33 in the third-place game. Puggy Bell of the New York Renaissance was named the tournament's Most Valuable Player.

== Results ==
=== Bracket ===
Round 1
Harlem Globetrotters	41
Fort Wayne Harvesters	33
New York Yankees	40
Brenton Harbor House of David	32
Sheboygan Red Skins	47
Illinois Grads	29
Oshkosh All-Stars	40
Clarksburg Oil	33

Quarterfinals
Harlem Globetrotters	31
Chicago Harmons	25
New York Renaissance	30
New York Yankees	21
Sheboygan Red Skins	36
Troy Celtics	29
Oshkosh All-Stars	BYE

Semifinals
Harlem Globetrotters	23
New York Renaissance	27
Sheboygan Red Skins	23
Oshkosh All-Stars	40

Final
New York Renaissance	34
Oshkosh All-Stars	25
Third place
Harlem Globetrotters	36
Sheboygan Red Skins	33

=== Third place game ===
28 March 1939

Box score

Harlem Globetrotters 36, Sheboygan Red Skins 33
Scoring by half: 19–20, 17–13
Pts: L. Bleach – 17	Pts: R. Adams – 12

Chicago Coliseum
Referees: Wilfred Smith, Nat Messinger

=== Championship game ===
28 March 1939

Box score

New York Renaissance 34, Oshkosh All-Stars 25
Scoring by half: 24–11, 10–14
Pts: P. Gates – 12	Pts: L. Edwards – 12

Chicago Coliseum
Attendance: 3,000
Referees: Kennedy, Old

== Individual awards ==
- Leroy Edwards of the Oshkosh All-Stars led this tournament in scoring with 49 points scored in three games played.

=== All-Tournament Team ===
- C - Leroy Edwards, Oshkosh All-Stars
- F - Ed Dancker, Sheboygan Red Skins
- F - Puggy Bell, New York Renaissance (MVP)
- G - Babe Pressley, Harlem Globetrotters
- G - Zack Clayton, New York Renaissance

== See also ==
- 1938–39 National Basketball League (United States) season, a professional basketball season featuring two of the competing teams there
- 1938–39 Troy Haymakers season, a professional basketball season featuring a team from the revived version of the original ABL that rebranded as the Troy Celtics for this event
- On the Shoulders of Giants (film), a 2011 documentary movie written by Kareem Abdul-Jabbar that focuses on the championship winning New York Renaissance during this event
