= Larry Bleach =

American baseball player

- Second baseman
- Born: July 16, 1912; Brunswick, Georgia, U.S.
- Died: March 15, 1991 (aged 78); Detroit, Michigan, U.S.
- Threw: Right

Negro league baseball debut
- 1937, for the Detroit Stars

Last appearance
- 1937, for the Detroit Stars
- Stats at Baseball Reference

Teams
- Detroit Stars (1937)

Laurence Benjamin Bleach (July 16, 1912 – March 15, 1991) was an American Negro league second baseman in 1937.

== Early life and career ==
A native of Brunswick, Georgia, Bleach attended the University of Detroit, where he excelled in basketball, becoming the Titans' first African American captain; he later played for the Harlem Globetrotters. Titans head coach Lloyd Brazil called Bleach "the best all-around basketball player I've ever coached". Bleach also played baseball very briefly in 1937 for the Detroit Stars of the Negro American League. Bleach died in Detroit, Michigan in 1991 at age 78.
