= Al Kellett =

American baseball player (1901–1960)

- Pitcher
- Born: October 30, 1901; Red Bank, New Jersey, U.S.
- Died: July 14, 1960 (aged 58); New York, New York, U.S.
- Batted: Right Threw: Right

MLB debut
- June 29, 1923, for the Philadelphia Athletics

Last MLB appearance
- August 30, 1924, for the Boston Red Sox

MLB statistics
- Win–loss record: 0–1
- Strikeouts: 1
- Earned run average: 8.10
- Stats at Baseball Reference

Teams
- Philadelphia Athletics (1923); Boston Red Sox (1924)

Alfred Henry Kellett (October 30, 1901 – July 14, 1960) was an American professional baseball and basketball player. He appeared in the major leagues as a relief pitcher for the Philadelphia Athletics in 1923 and the Boston Red Sox in 1924

In a six-game major-league career, Kellett posted a 0–1 record with an 8.10 ERA in 10 innings of work. Listed at 6 feet 3 inches (1.91 m) and 200 pounds (91 kg), Kellett batted and threw right-handed.

Kellett also played as and a center for various professional basketball teams, including the Brooklyn Visitations and Original Celtics, between 1922 and 1941.
