= Thomas Barlow (basketball) =

American basketball player (1896–1983)

Thomas B. Barlow (July 9, 1896 in Trenton, New Jersey – September 26, 1983 in Lakehurst, New Jersey) was an American professional basketball player. He is mostly known for his time with the Philadelphia Sphas and Philadelphia Warriors of the ABL (1925–31). He was inducted into the Naismith Memorial Basketball Hall of Fame in 1981.
