= Harry Riconda =

American baseball player (1897–1958)

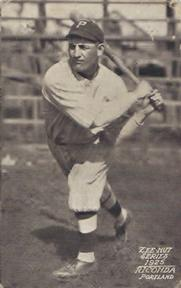
- Third baseman
- Born: March 17, 1897; New York City, New York, U.S.
- Died: November 15, 1958 (aged 61); Mahopac, New York, U.S.
- Batted: Right Threw: Right

MLB debut
- April 19, 1923, for the Philadelphia Athletics

Last MLB appearance
- April 18, 1930, for the Cincinnati Reds

MLB statistics
- Batting average: .247
- Home runs: 4
- Runs batted in: 70
- Stats at Baseball Reference

Teams
- Philadelphia Athletics (1923–1924); Boston Braves (1926); Brooklyn Robins (1928); Pittsburgh Pirates (1929); Cincinnati Reds (1930)

Henry Paul Riconda (March 17, 1897 – November 15, 1958) was an American professional baseball and basketball player who played third base from 1923 to 1930 and forward from 1919 to 1930.

== Baseball career ==
Prior to the 1923 Major League Baseball season, Riconda was purchased by the Philadelphia Athletics from the New Haven Profs for $5,000. On November 17, 1924, Riconda was traded with Chuck Rowland, Dennis Burns, Bob Hasty, Ed Sherling and $35,000 to the Portland Beavers of the Pacific Coast League for Mickey Cochrane. In October 1925, he was drafted by the Boston Braves in the 1925 Rule 5 draft. Riconda was traded with Frank Wilson to the Milwaukee Brewers of the American Association as part of a trade completed earlier for Lance Richbourg. In September 1927, Milwaukee traded Riconda to the Brooklyn Robins for Johnny Butler. In December 1928, Brooklyn traded Riconda along with Jesse Petty to the Pittsburgh Pirates for Glenn Wright. The Kansas City Monarchs of the American Association purchased his contract in June 1929. He was drafted in the Rule 5 Draft in 1929 by the Cincinnati Reds.

== Basketball career ==
Riconda began playing basketball while in the United States Navy during World War I because the basketball team was allowed to leave the station in Tompkinsville, Staten Island every week to travel for games. After the war, a former teammate invited him to play professionally in Albany for a team that included Barney Sedran and Marty Friedman. Riconda spent the next several winters playing professionally for teams in Kingston, Paterson and Philadelphia. In 1929, he played for the Original Celtics of the American Basketball League.

== Personal life and death ==
Riconda attended P.S. 15 in Corona, Queens and Newtown High School.

Riconda survived a heart attack in 1945. Thirteen years later, he suffered a fatal heart attack at his summer home in Mahopac, New York.
