= Bronx Yankees =

The Bronx Yankees were an American basketball team based in the Bronx in New York City, that was a member of the American Basketball League for a brief period.

During the first half of the 1937–38 season, the team became the New York Yankees. They dropped out of the league on 11 January 1938 near the halfway point of their first and only season.

== Year-by-year ==
Year	League	Reg. season	Playoffs
1937/38	ABL	N/A	N/A
