= Ted Collins (talent manager) =

American show business manager (1900–1964)

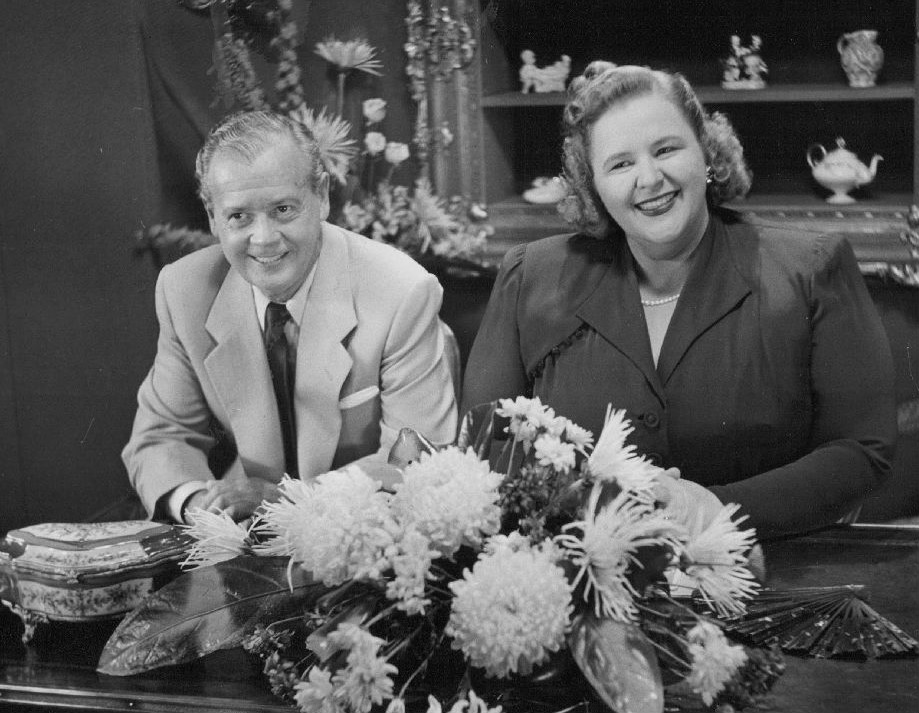
Collins and singer Kate Smith on her television show (1953)

Ted Collins (October 12, 1900 – May 27, 1964) was an American show business manager, best known for managing singer and TV show star Kate Smith, (1930–1964) for more than thirty years.

Collins was also involved in professional sports, as owner of the National Football League's franchises Boston Yanks (1944–48) and which followed as the New York Bulldogs/Yanks (1949–51), the Dallas Texans, in 1952, and the Baltimore Colts in 1953. He was considerably more successful in entertainment management than as an oldtime NFL owner.

Collins died at age 63 in May 1964, of a heart attack in Lake Placid, New York, at a doctor's office. He had previous health issues, including a heart attack in 1956.
