= John Beckman =

American basketball player (1895–1968)

John Albert Beckman (October 22, 1895, in New York, NY – June 22, 1968, in Miami, Florida) was a professional basketball player.

During his 27 years lasting pro career (1914–41) he was known as the "Babe Ruth of basketball". He is mostly known for his time with the Original Celtics (1918–19, 1921–27, 1929). He was enshrined in the Naismith Memorial Basketball Hall of Fame in 1973.

== Professional career ==
Beckman began playing for St. Gabriel's Catholic School in Manhattan as a 15 year old in 1910. He did not attend college but instead played for the Opals of the Hudson County League in 1910. In 1915, Beckman played for De Neri, an EL team based in Philadelphia, he played 34 of the team's 40 games, making 88 field goals and 74 free throws. Concluding the season with 250 points and finishing third in scoring in the EL, with an average of 7.4 points per game – a high average in a low-scoring basketball era. In the 1917–18 season, the EL was postponed early because of World War I. Beckman led the EL in scoring with 9.25 points per game.

In 1945, four years after his last game played as a professional basketball player, Beckman would be a first team member of what was deemed the "All-Time Stars of Professional Basketball", which consisted of votes from the six general managers from the teams playing in the 1944–45 NBL season. Holman was joined alongside two other former Original Celtics players in Nat Holman and Dutch Dehnert (the latter of whom also being a champion teammate of his when playing for the Cleveland Rosenblums), as well as the Fort Wayne Zollner Pistons' Bobby McDermott and the Oshkosh All-Stars' Leroy Edwards from the NBL.

== Player profile ==
The 156 pound forward, was referred to as one of the true stars of the earliest years of basketball. He was considered the best free-throw shooter of his era. His prolific free-throw shooting and gritty playing style always excited crowds. In 1918, Beckman's teammate, Chris Leonard of the Original Celtics, considered Beckman, "a master of the fastbreak", due to his lightning speed. Beckman was a complete offensive player respected for his scoring ability, having outstanding shooting ability along with his slashing ability. He was credited as a valuable team player, for his selflessness and commitment in teamwork, passing and team defense.
