= Dutch Dehnert =

American basketball player and coach

Personal information
- Born: April 5, 1898 New York City, New York, U.S.
- Died: April 20, 1979 (aged 81) Far Rockaway, New York, U.S.
- Listed height: 6 ft 1 in (1.85 m)
- Listed weight: 210 lb (95 kg)

Career information
- Playing career: 1926–1930
- Position: Forward / center

Career history

Playing
- 1926–1928: Original Celtics
- 1928–1930: Cleveland Rosenblums
- 1930–1931: Toledo Red Man Tobaccos

Career highlights
- As player: EBL champion (1922); 4× ABL champion (1927–1930); All-Time Pro Stars First Team (1945); As head coach: WPBT champion (1941)
- Basketball Hall of Fame

Henry G. "Dutch" Dehnert (April 5, 1898 – April 20, 1979) was an American basketball player whose career lasted from 1915 to 1935.

Dehnert, a bulky forward born in New York City, New York, is mostly known for his time with the Original Celtics and is sometimes credited with inventing the pivot play, which eventually led to the 3 second violation rule. He later coached several teams in the NBL, ABL, BAA, and PBLA.

In the early days of the sport, there was a "running guard" who brought the ball up the court and passed or attacked the basket, like a point or combo guard. There was also a "stationary guard" who made long shots and hung back on defense effectively cherry-picking before there was the rule of backcourt violations. The pivot play was invented by Dehnert when during set plays, he kept running into the opposing team's stationary guard.

One of those teams Dehnert coached was the Sheboygan Red Skins, who won NBL divisional titles in 1944–45 and 1945–46 under Dehnert's guidance. Dehnert's greatest coup during his time in Sheboygan was his signing of three East Coast stars: Al Lucas of Fordham, Al Moschetti of St. John's and Bobby Holm of Seton Hall. Buoyed by this added strength, the Red Skins took a 2–0 lead over the Fort Wayne Zollner Pistons in the 1945 NBL championship series, only to be swept in the remaining three games. In 1946, Dehnert led Sheboygan to a meeting with the vaunted Rochester Royals in the championship series. Rochester swept the Red Skins. The next season, Dehnert became first head coach of the Cleveland Rebels for the Basketball Association of America's first season. He coached Ken Sailors who pioneered the jump shot. In late 1947, he coached the Chattanooga Majors of the short-lived Professional Basketball League of America.

He was the uncle of Providence Steamrollers player Red Dehnert.

== Head coaching record ==
Legend
Regular season	G	Games coached	W	Games won	L	Games lost	W–L %	Win–loss %
Playoffs	PG	Playoff games	PW	Playoff wins	PL	Playoff losses	PW–L %	Playoff win–loss %

=== NBA ===
Team	Year	G	W	L	W–L%	Finish	PG	PW	PL	PW–L%	Result
Cleveland	1946–47	37	17	20	.459	(fired)	—	—	—	—	—
