= 1925–26 American Basketball League season =

Basketball league season

1925–26 ABL season
- League: American Basketball League
- Sport: Basketball
- Duration: November 15, 1925 – April 9, 1926; April 7–9, 1926 (Championship)
- Games: 16 (1st half); 14 (2nd half); 30 (overall)
- Teams: 9 (1st half); 8 (2nd half)

Split regular season
- Top scorer: Rusty Saunders (Brooklyn Arcadians / Washington Palace Five; total points); Ray Kennedy (Washington Palace Five; PPG average)
- First Half champions: Brooklyn Arcadians
- First Half runners-up: Washington Palace Five
- Second Half champions: Cleveland Rosenblums
- Second Half runners-up: Washington Palace Five

World Series
- Venue: Public Hall Auditorium, Cleveland, Ohio; 71st Regiment Armory, Manhattan, New York
- Champions: Cleveland Rosenblums
- Runners-up: Brooklyn Arcadians

ABL seasons
- 1926–27 →

The 1925–26 ABL season was the first, inaugural season of the original rendition of the American Basketball League (ABL) ever created. It would be the first attempt to ever have a fully nationalized, successful professional basketball league similar to what would be done for Major League Baseball with baseball, the National Hockey League with hockey, and even the National Football League with American football (and at the time, soccer as well with the American Soccer League being its latest league success story) after basketball would primarily stick with having regional professional leagues from the late 1890s up until 1925. Many of the successful rules from professional basketball's history that stuck around from the present-day era could be traced back to the founding of the ABL for when some of them first started gaining traction. Much like most basketball seasons played during the sport's early era of professional play, this season would utilize the split season format of two half-seasons of competition, with the two best teams from each half competing in a championship series to determine the final champion for the season, if deemed necessary on their ends. The ABL would make its regular season debut on November 15, 1925, with its World Series championship series concluding on April 9, 1926. While it's currently unknown when exactly the first half of the season started or when the second half of the season ended (though it's suggested that some time around or after February 12, 1926, was the time the second half of the season would begin properly due to the Boston Whirlwinds withdrawing (and/or being expelled) from the league due to player contract disputes on that day), what is known is that the Brooklyn Arcadians and Cleveland Rosenblums would win their respective half-seasons of play, which resulted in the Rosenblums winning the inaugural "World Series" championship that the ABL held with a 3–0 sweep over the Arcadians.

== Creation of the League ==
The ABL's creation would be considered the initiative of the triumvirate of Palace Laundry's George Preston Marshall (who would create the Washington Palace Five team to promote his business and later be best known for owning the team that's currently known as the Washington Commanders in the NFL), Rosenblum's clothing store owner Max Rosenblum (who would create the Cleveland Rosenblums), and Chicago Bears team owner George Halas (who would create the Chicago Bruins) where under the guidance of them and NFL president Joseph Carr (where Carr would operate with the ABL during the time where it often wouldn't interfere with his presence with his work with the NFL), they would look to create a professional basketball league where the sport would act similar to those other leagues that had professional athletes playing at the time as opposed to having to gamble on whether key players are on certain teams that they were signed up with for the season or not. The official organizational meeting where the creation of the ABL was held took place on April 25, 1925, in Cleveland, Ohio, with the members coming from the Eastern and Midwestern regions of the U.S.A. agreeing to have Carr be the league's president and secretary, with the league originally intending for there to be thirteen different teams planned out at the time (fourteen if one were to include a team that was missing from the original meeting that ultimately joined the league later on) before ultimately having just nine teams around to officially start out their inaugural season instead. Despite the initial omissions of two legendary historic teams in the Original Celtics from the New York City area and the Philadelphia SPHAs, many of the cities involved with the league's initial creation would still fit the ideal goals of the league in having big-name cities (usually with MLB teams nearby in the offseason), with the smaller sized cities like Buffalo and Rochester, New York alongside Fort Wayne, Indiana holding sufficient size and/or fan support to make their entries worthwhile to the league. Not only that, but those same teams in question would also look to have had prior success on an independent basis before moving on to the professional level in the ABL for this season going forward.

== Teams ==
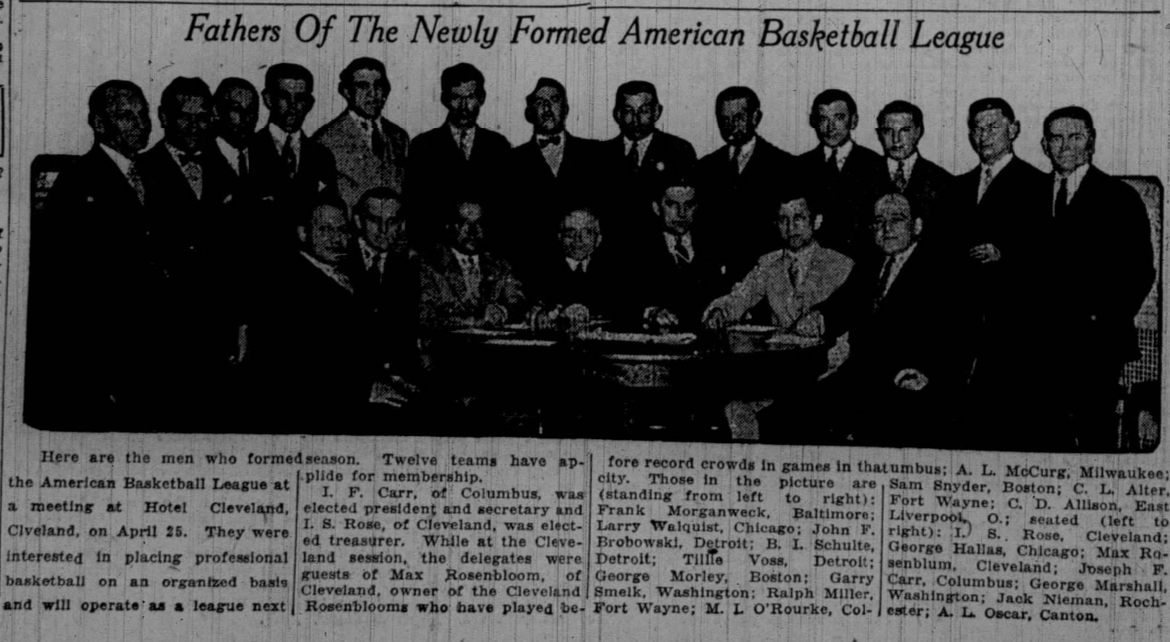
Founders of the ABL, 1925

Before beginning their operations properly, the ABL would initially have 13 locations planned out from their initial organizational meeting on April 25, 1925, in Cleveland, Ohio. In addition to the already agreed upon planned locations for Cleveland, Ohio, Washington, D.C., and Chicago, Illinois; there would also be multiple other locations out in the state of Ohio considered with Camden, Columbus, and East Liverpool, as well as Baltimore, Maryland; Milwaukee, Wisconsin; Boston, Massachusetts; Detroit, Michigan; Brooklyn, New York; Rochester, New York, and Fort Wayne, Indiana that were all considered as entries for the inaugural season of the ABL. However, for one reason or another, teams that were planned to be held in Baltimore, Camden, Columbus, Milwaukee, and especially East Liverpool would not end up occurring (in time) for the inaugural season of play. However, one location that was not in the initial meeting at the time in Buffalo, New York would end up getting a team entered in the league in time with the Buffalo Bisons, who were considered to be either a continuation or a successor of sorts of the Naismith Basketball Hall of Fame Buffalo Germans team. In any case, the ABL would start the season out with nine teams for the first half of the season, though it would diminish down to eight teams instead by the second half of the season due to the departure of the Boston Whirlwinds. Originally, the inaugural season planned on having a 36-game regular season schedule, but due to a combination of the East Liverpool team dropping out before the season began and the Boston Whirlwinds leaving during the second half of the season, the regular season would officially hold 30 games for the remaining teams instead.

American Basketball League
Boston Whirlwinds

Boston, Massachusetts

Brooklyn Arcadians

Brooklyn, New York

Buffalo Bisons

Buffalo, New York

Chicago Bruins

Chicago, Illinois

Cleveland Rosenblums

Cleveland, Ohio

Detroit Pulaski Post Five

Detroit, Michigan

Fort Wayne Caseys

Fort Wayne, Indiana

Rochester Centrals

Rochester, New York

Washington Palace Five

Washington, D.C.

Coaching changes
In-season
| Team | Outgoing coach | Incoming coach |
|---|---|---|
| Detroit Pulaski Post Five | Tillie Voss (player-coach) | Bruno Smokiewicz (player-coach) |
| Fort Wayne Caseys | Ralph Miller (player-coach) | Johnny Whitty (player-coach) |
| Washington Palace Five | Lou Sugarman (player-coach) | Ray Kennedy (player-coach) |

== Basketball Rule Changes ==
When creating the American Basketball League, their league would utilize a mixture of professional basketball rules that had been used in past leagues before this one and rules utilized from the Amateur Athletic Union at the time. Some of the rules from the AAU that would be utilized from the original iteration of the ABL would include games being played under two 20-minute halves, eliminating the allowance of both cages (thus allowing for an out of bounds area) and the two-handed double dribble, implementing the three-second lane and fouling out violations, and being the first professional basketball league to make backboards a mandatory addition for the sport (with backboards being more commonly found for the sport in the present day ever since then). In addition to those rules, the ABL became the first professional basketball league to have viable professional contracts for players to sign up and stay with their original teams on a yearly basis (similar to what the Original Celtics would do with their players throughout the 1920s), with an average monthly salary at the time being up to $1,500 per month when the average laborer at the time would have made $15 per week; this would be done to help stop players from jumping around from various teams throughout an entire season's worth of play, which plagued professional basketball's popularity in its early history. Finally, it became the first professional basketball league to outright forbid gambling on its games to occur in general since it saw what had occurred with the 1919 World Series as a notable infamous example on how gambling could ruin a sport's enjoyment for people.

== Assessment ==
When the inaugural season got underway, an immediate pattern was caught where, with scant few exceptions, the league's best players were found in the metropolitan areas of New York or Philadelphia, meaning teams that were more reliant on local talents like Boston, Buffalo, Chicago, and Fort Wayne would be in immediate trouble while teams that were close(r) to those specific areas like Brooklyn, Cleveland, and Washington would thrive in the league with their dominant play throughout the season. Despite the troubling early sign at hand, the ABL would see positive reviews from those that saw the league play their games in question with immediate box office success occurring in every location outside of Boston, which led to the Boston Whirlwinds leaving the league on February 12, 1926. Even without seeing the Boston Whirlwinds around for the second half of the season, the ABL would successfully complete their first season with every other team being able to survive by the end of the season, with only the Buffalo Bisons deciding to exit out of the league following this season's conclusion. As such, this season would be seen as a considerable success for the ABL when considering their goals at the time.

== Final standings ==
=== First half ===
First Half
| Team | Wins | Losses | Winning % |
|---|---|---|---|
| Brooklyn Arcadians | 12 | 4 | .750 |
| Washington Palace Five | 11 | 5 | .688 |
| Cleveland Rosenblums | 10 | 6 | .625 |
| Rochester Centrals | 9 | 7 | .562 |
| Fort Wayne Caseys | 7 | 9 | .438 |
| Chicago Bruins | 6 | 10 | .375 |
| Detroit Pulaski Post Five | 6 | 10 | .375 |
| Boston Whirlwinds^{×} | 6 | 10 | .375 |
| Buffalo Bisons | 5 | 11 | .322 |

× – The Boston Whirlwinds were expelled by the end of the first half of the season due to a dispute over player contracts.

=== Second half ===
Second Half
| Team | Wins | Losses | Winning % |
|---|---|---|---|
| Cleveland Rosenblums | 13 | 1 | .919 |
| Washington Palace Five | 11 | 3 | .786 |
| Rochester Centrals | 9 | 5 | .643 |
| Brooklyn Arcadians | 7 | 7 | .500 |
| Fort Wayne Caseys | 6 | 8 | .429 |
| Buffalo Bisons | 5 | 9 | .357 |
| Chicago Bruins | 3 | 11 | .214 |
| Detroit Pulaski Post Five | 2 | 12 | .143 |

== Championship Series (World Series) ==
Only the two best teams from each half-season would qualify for the championship series (dubbed as the World Series for basketball at the time), which was a one-round best-of-five championship event. The Brooklyn Arcadians would win the first half of the season with a 12–4 record, while the Cleveland Rosenblums won the second half of the season by nearly going undefeated for that half of the season with a 13–1 record. For the first championship series ever held by the ABL, the Cleveland Rosenblums would end up sweeping the Brooklyn Arcadians 3–0, with the Arcadians replacing their usual Arcadia Hall venue with the 71st Regiment Armory for the decisive third and final game of the series.

| ABL Championship |
| 1st Half Winner | Brooklyn Arcadians | 33 | 21 | 22 |
| 2nd Half Winner | Cleveland Rosenblums | 36 | 37 | 23 |

- Bold Series winner

== Statistics ==
At the end of the inaugural season of the ABL, Rusty Saunders from the Brooklyn Arcadians and the Washington Palace Five would end up being the leading scorer of the entire league in its inaugural season with 238 points scored for an average of 7.0 points per game. In terms of points per game averages, however, there would be three other players that would produce a higher points per game average with less total points scored that season by comparison to Saunders, with Elmer Ripley of the Brooklyn Arcadians scoring 214 points through an average of 7.2 points per game, Honey Russell of the Cleveland Rosenblums scoring 216 points through an average of 7.2 points per game, and Ray Kennedy of the Washington Palace Five also scoring 216 points, but with an average of 8.0 points per game instead.

== See also ==
- American Basketball League
