= 1925–26 Washington Palace Five season =

- League: American Basketball League (original)
- Head coach: Lou Sugarman (13–6); Ray Kennedy (9–2)
- General manager: George Preston Marshall
- Owner(s): George Preston Marshall
- Arena: Washington Arcade

Results
- Record: 22–8 (.733)
- Place: Conference: 2nd (both halves)
- Playoff finish: Did not qualify (Failed to qualify for the ABL championship series due to them not getting first place in either half-season for this season.)

The 1925–26 Washington Palace Five season was both the first professional basketball season for the Palace Five team (which sometimes were shortened down more properly to the Laundrymen or even the Palacians as a more proper team name due to the Palace Five name being a shorthand for George Preston Marshall's local Washington Palace Laundry laundromat business) in Washington, D.C. and the first season of existence as a professional franchise and the first season of existence for the American Basketball League, which was the first professional basketball league that had truly attempted to go fully national after previous professional basketball leagues were mostly regional at the time. The American Basketball League's inaugural season would have nine teams competing in that season (while a tenth team in East Liverpool, Ohio was intended to join the Palace Five squad alongside the other eight teams in question for this season, the East Liverpool team ultimately withdrew operations before the season even began properly, with other failed locations that had submitted entries to start the ABL's inaugural season including Baltimore, Maryland (who eventually got their own team the following season); Milwaukee, Wisconsin; and two more locations in the state of Ohio via Columbus and Camden), though the ABL would compete in a split season format with two half seasons being utilized instead of one whole season being utilized throughout the season (which would be the case throughout the majority of the league's existence in the first place). However, by the time the first half of the season ended and the second half of the season began, the Boston Whirlwinds would be expelled from the ABL due to a dispute over player contracts, which led to the ABL entering the second half of the season with only eight teams remaining in their league this time around. In any case, the first season for the Palace Five team was a considerable success for them in terms of overall records, as their total record of 22–8 would be seen as one of the best records showcased around the entire league (though it would not be the very best record within the entire league for that season since they would end up being the second-best team of the entire league in terms of overall records). During the first half of the season, the Laundrymen would end up being one game shy from taking on the first place spot for that half of the season with their 11–5 record due to the surprising performance of the Brooklyn Arcadians stealing the first place spot away from the Washington squad at basically the last minute. As for the second half of the season, the Palace Five squad would end up having an even better 11–3 record that would only be behind the nearly undefeated Cleveland Rosenblums to end that particular half of the season. If the ABL had worked under a proper regular season format, the Washington Palace Five squad would have ended up qualifying for the equivalent of the ABL playoffs due to them having the second-best overall record of the entire league. Unfortunately for them, the split season formatting resulted in the champions of the first half of the season, the Brooklyn Arcadians, and the champions of the second half of the season, the Cleveland Rosenblums, competing in a best-of-five championship series instead, with Washington failing to qualify for the league's championship series despite having a better overall record than Brooklyn due to the Palace Five squad failing to win either half-season within the ABL during this season.

== Roster ==
Due to information on American Basketball League players being generally hard to find, there are bound to be more gaps and/or inaccuracies found in certain areas on the team's roster spots than usual.

1925–26 Washington Palace Five / Laundrymen roster
Players

Pos.	No.	Player	Height	Weight	DOB	From
F		Whitey Bernot	6 ft 2 in (1.88 m)	175 lb (79 kg)	1901-06-18	No college
G		Curley Christian	5 ft 8 in (1.73 m)	140 lb (64 kg)	1903-06-15	Susquehanna
G/F		Red Conaty	5 ft 11 in (1.80 m)	160 lb (73 kg)	1904-02-12	St. Francis College
F/C		Jerry Conway	6 ft 2 in (1.88 m)	190 lb (86 kg)	1901-06-07	St. Anselm
G		Rody Cooney	5 ft 8 in (1.73 m)	140 lb (64 kg)	1902-05-17	No college
G/F		George Glasco	5 ft 10 in (1.78 m)	150 lb (68 kg)	1901-04-07	No college
G/F		Bob Grody	6 ft 2 in (1.88 m)	215 lb (98 kg)	1900-04-25	Hamilton College
C		Horse Haggerty	6 ft 4 in (1.93 m)	225 lb (102 kg)	1891-07-04	No college
G		Cowboy Jones	5 ft 11 in (1.80 m)	170 lb (77 kg)	1900-10-02	No college
G		Teddy Kearns	5 ft 11 in (1.80 m)	180 lb (82 kg)	1900-01-01	Perkiomen Prep School (NJ)
G		Ray Kennedy	5 ft 9 in (1.75 m)	160 lb (73 kg)	1893-10-10	Manhattan
G/F		Rusty Saunders	6 ft 2 in (1.88 m)	210 lb (95 kg)	1906-03-12	Central HS (NJ)
G/F		Lou Sugarman	5 ft 6 in (1.68 m)	145 lb (66 kg)	1889-10-10	Notre Dame

Coaches
Head coach

Lou Sugarman
Ray Kennedy

Legend
- (DP) Unsigned draft pick
- (FA) Free agent
- (S) Suspended
- Injured

== American Basketball League Standings ==
First Half
Team	Wins	Losses	Winning %
Brooklyn Arcadians	12	4	.750
Washington Palace Five / Laundrymen	11	5	.688
Cleveland Rosenblums	10	6	.625
Rochester Centrals	9	7	.562
Fort Wayne Caseys	7	9	.438
Chicago Bruins	6	10	.375
Detroit Pulaski Post Five	6	10	.375
Boston Whirlwinds^{×}	6	10	.375
Buffalo Bisons / Germans	5	11	.322

× – The Boston Whirlwinds were expelled by the end of the first half of the season due to a dispute over player contracts.

Second Half
Team	Wins	Losses	Winning %
Cleveland Rosenblums	13	1	.919
Washington Palace Five / Laundrymen	11	3	.786
Rochester Centrals	9	5	.643
Brooklyn Arcadians	7	7	.500
Fort Wayne Caseys	6	8	.429
Buffalo Bisons / Germans	5	9	.357
Chicago Bruins	3	11	.214
Detroit Pulaski Post Five	2	12	.143

== Awards and honors ==
By the end of the season, Rusty Saunders would end up being the leading scorer of the entire league in its inaugural season with 238 points scored for an average of 7.0 points per game.
