= 1926–27 American Basketball League season =

1926–27 ABL season
- League: American Basketball League
- Sport: Basketball
- Duration: 1926 – April 9, 1927; April 7–9, 1927 (Championship)
- Games: 21 (both halves); 42 (overall)
- Teams: 9 (until December 1926); 8 (after December 1926)

Split regular season
- Top scorer: Rusty Saunders (Washington Palace Five; total points); Bennie Borgmann (Fort Wayne Hoosiers; PPG average)
- First Half champions: Cleveland Rosenblums
- First Half runners-up: Washington Palace Five
- Second Half champions: Brooklyn Celtics
- Second Half runners-up: Fort Wayne Hoosiers

World Series
- Venue: Arcadia Hall, Brooklyn, New York; Public Hall Auditorium, Cleveland, Ohio
- Champions: Brooklyn Celtics
- Runners-up: Cleveland Rosenblums

ABL seasons
- ← 1925–26 1927–28 →

The 1926–27 ABL season was the second season of the original rendition of the American Basketball League (ABL). While the ABL initially faced an early threat in their season with the "original" version of the National Basketball League (which featured the Original Celtics as one of the teams there after they originally first left the ABL a month before its season was supposed to begin for the NBL), the ABL would end up making some power play moves to end the immediate threat early on in the season (albeit at the cost of them losing two winless teams early on in the season), with the same Original Celtics from the NBL taking over the spot held by the since-struggling Brooklyn Arcadians for the rest of the season not long afterward (albeit with the Celtics taking on the Brooklyn Celtics name for the rest of the season in the ABL instead of their typical Original Celtics name properly, even though they would still sometimes be referred to as the Original Celtics anyways). Their power play threat would also later cause them to shut down the Metropolitan Basketball League as a potential rivaling professional basketball league to compete against the ABL not long afterward as well. While it would be unknown as to when the regular season would begin or end this time around (or even when the first half of the season would end and when the second half of the season would begin), due to the ABL once again utilizing the split season formatting for their competitive operations, they would see Cleveland and Brooklyn compete in their World Series for the ABL's championship series once again, with it this time being the Cleveland Rosenblums and the Brooklyn Celtics (who replaced the Brooklyn Arcadians early on in the first half of the season) being the winners of each half-season played in the league. Unlike the previous season, however, it would be Brooklyn's new team in the Brooklyn Celtics (who were really just the Original Celtics operating under a temporary name for this season) that would win the World Series with a 3–0 sweep over the defending champion Rosenblums.

== Teams ==
Following the previous season's conclusion, only the Buffalo Bisons would end up withdrawing their operations from the ABL entirely before the start of this season began, with the Fort Wayne Caseys deciding to rebrand themselves into their more well-known Fort Wayne Hoosiers name for at least the rest of their time spent in the ABL going forward. However, the ABL would initially plan on having three teams added in their league to start out the season for an even ten-team league with a team added in Baltimore, Maryland (potentially being the same team that was originally planned to enter the league from the previous season before being shafted from entry for some unknown reason) in the Baltimore Orioles basketball team (not related to the present-day Major League Baseball team of the same name), a team from Philadelphia, Pennsylvania in the Philadelphia Quakers (who were essentially just the Jewish-based Philadelphia SPHAs team that sometimes were also referred to as the Phillies while in the ABL and also would later rebrand themselves during the second half of the season as the Philadelphia Warriors, which later were the inspiration of the future NBA team that became the present-day Golden State Warriors), and a team from New York City in the Naismith Basketball Hall of Fame-worthy Original Celtics franchise (with the Celtics being a reluctant addition on their ends due to the ABL forbidding their teams from playing any further games with the Original Celtics team unless they became a proper member of their league). However, just one month before the regular season began, the Original Celtics ended up leaving the ABL behind (at the time) for a rivaling new league in the "original" National Basketball League (which would also feature the Metropolitan Basketball League's Brooklyn Visitations as a competitor there alongside mostly merged team operations) that sought to cut into the ABL's operations (with the Original Celtics driving a hard bargain from the newly created league in the process in order to even acquire their services at all during that period of time), meaning the ABL would start their season with only nine teams competing once again. However, due to some shrewd tactics that the ABL would pull right back against the "original" NBL, the ABL would only end up losing the Detroit Pulaski Post Five team (who would apparently decide to rebrand themselves as the Detroit Lions sometime during this short season of theirs) and the runner-up Brooklyn Arcadians team that was owned by MLB star Harry Heilmann, with the latter team technically merging their operations with the Original Celtics when they decided to return to the ABL after the NBL ended up breaking down upon its operations to have the Celtics operate their season under the temporary Brooklyn Celtics moniker for the rest of this season only.

American Basketball League
Baltimore Orioles

Baltimore, Maryland

Brooklyn Arcadians/Celtics

Brooklyn, New York

Chicago Bruins

Chicago, Illinois

Cleveland Rosenblums

Cleveland, Ohio

Detroit Pulaski Post Five / Lions

Detroit, Michigan

Fort Wayne Hoosiers

Fort Wayne, Indiana

Philadelphia Quakers / Warriors

Philadelphia, Pennsylvania

Rochester Centrals

Rochester, New York

Washington Palace Five

Washington, D.C.

Coaching changes
Offseason
Team	1925–26 coach	1926–27 coach
Detroit Pulaski Post Five / Lions	Bruno Smokiewicz (player-coach)	Jimmy Conzelman (player-coach)
Fort Wayne Caseys / Hoosiers	Johnny Whitty (player-coach)	Ralph Miller & Bennie Borgmann (player-coaches)
Philadelphia SPHAs / Quakers	Eddie Gottlieb	Harry Passon & Eddie Gottlieb
In-season
Team	Outgoing coach	Incoming coach
Baltimore Orioles	Lou Sugarman (1st half player-coach)	John Beckman (2nd half player-coach)
Brooklyn Arcadians / Celtics	Garry Schmeelk (Arcadians player-coach)	Johnny Whitty (Celtics)
Chicago Bruins	Laurie Walquist	Garry Schmeelk (player-coach)

== Preseason ==
Originally, the ABL planned to have three teams added into their league in the Baltimore Orioles, the Philadelphia Quakers, and the Original Celtics (who potentially were going to be called the New York Original Celtics by this time) in exchange for the Buffalo Bisons leaving the league to have ten teams around to start out their new season. However, around a month before the ABL's season was set to begin, the Original Celtics would end up defecting from the ABL into a new rivaling league in the "original" National Basketball League (which was created from the Metropolitan Basketball League as a way to siphon off the quality of the ABL into their new league), with the NBL also taking away quality players from each of the Brooklyn Arcadians, Detroit Pulaski Post Five, and Washington Palace Five squads. Washington would soon afterward raid both the Brooklyn and Detroit squads due to the shrewd presence of team owner George Preston Marshall in order to recover any potential talents that could be salvaged for their team following the unexpected raid from the newly-rivaling NBL in order to recapture whatever quality play could still be had on the Palace Five team entering this season of play, which ultimately left the Arcadians and Pulaski Post Five squads out to dry.

== Regular season ==
After seeing winless starts to the season go down for multiple teams go down between the new Baltimore Orioles expansion team, the inaugural runner-up Brooklyn Arcadians, and the Detroit Pulaski Post Five turned Lions, the ABL would decide to do some brash moves on their ends to help ensure not just their long-term survival, but also bring a swift end to the newly-rivaling National Basketball League as well. Those moves would not only involve secretly negotiating a new deal with the Original Celtics early in the month of December to join the ABL (once again) and leave the newly created NBL thinking that the "original" National Basketball League would be next to nothing without the Original Celtics' presence (which would be a correct assertion on their ends since the NBL would fold operations entirely on December 14, 1926), but also drop the Brooklyn Arcadians and Detroit Pulaski Post Five turned Lions teams (with the Arcadians technically being considered a merged operation with the Celtics due to the Original Celtics taking on the temporary moniker of the Brooklyn Celtics for just this season only, while the Detroit Pulaski Post Five turned Lions officially having their winless record being dropped from the league's record books entirely by December 23, 1926) and at least try to help out the newly added Baltimore Orioles basketball team by adding a bunch of players that were from the recently closed down NBL (and later on, an Original Celtics star player as well) onto the team for good measure. With those moves, Joseph Carr and the rest of the ABL would, in one fell swoop, sign up (or rather, regain) the most famous basketball team of its time onto their own league, destroy a potentially serious rivaling league in the "original" National Basketball League, and provided the ABL with an additional pool of dozens of top-tier players for the league to work with in that era to help establish its dominance as a professional basketball league early on. Following the conclusion of the first half of the season and the start of the second half of the season, the Philadelphia Quakers would also officially rebrand themselves into the Philadelphia Warriors name that Eddie Gottlieb would later use as inspiration to eventually create the present-day Golden State Warriors team from. Not only that, but the Brooklyn Celtics would only use the 0–5 handicap that the Brooklyn Arcadians had at the start of their season (and the technically accurate Brooklyn Arcadians / Celtics name) for the first half of the season only, as the second half of the season onward would be all about the Celtics in regards to this Brooklyn squad.

== Final standings ==
=== First half ===
First Half
Team	Wins	Losses	Winning %
Cleveland Rosenblums	17	4	.810
Washington Palace Five / Laundrymen	16	5	.762
Philadelphia Quakers*	14	7	.667
Brooklyn Arcadians/Brooklyn Celtics**	13	8	.619
Fort Wayne Hoosiers	8	13	.381
Rochester Centrals	8	13	.381
Chicago Bruins	7	14	.333
Baltimore Orioles	1	20	.048
Detroit Pulaski Post Five / Pulaski / Lions†	0	6	.000

* – The Philadelphia SPHAs would replace the Philadelphia Quakers during the second half of the season, albeit while playing under the original Philadelphia Warriors name instead of their typical Philadelphia SPHAs name.
** – After playing only in five total games this season (all of which ended in defeats), the Brooklyn Arcadians would have their franchise rights be both transferred and replaced by the Original Celtics franchise under the temporarily implemented name of the Brooklyn Celtics for the rest of this season in the ABL.
† – Withdrew from the ABL after playing only six total games during the first half of this season, with their games being stricken from the official league record books during this season.

=== Second half ===
Second Half
Team	Wins	Losses	Winning %
Brooklyn Celtics*	19	2	.905
Fort Wayne Hoosiers	15	6	.714
Washington Palace Five / Laundrymen	14	7	.667
Philadelphia Warriors**	10	11	.476
Cleveland Rosenblums	9	12	.429
Chicago Bruins	6	15	.286
Rochester Centrals	6	15	.286
Baltimore Orioles	5	16	.238

* – After playing only five total games this season (all of which ended in defeats), the Brooklyn Arcadians would have their franchise rights be both transferred and replaced by the Original Celtics franchise under the temporarily implemented name of the Brooklyn Celtics for the rest of this season in the ABL.
** – The Philadelphia SPHAs would replace the Philadelphia Quakers during the second half of the season, albeit while playing under the original Philadelphia Warriors name instead of their typical Philadelphia SPHAs name.

== Championship Series (World Series) ==
Similarly to the inaugural season of play, only the two best teams from each half-season would qualify for the championship series (dubbed as the World Series for basketball at the time), which was a one-round best-of-five championship event. For this season, the Cleveland Rosenblums would win the first half of the season with a 17–4 record, while the Brooklyn Celtics (as they were called in the ABL during this season only) won the second half of the season by nearly going undefeated for that half of the season with a 19–2 record, with their only two losses in that particular half being against the Rosenblums and the Rochester Centrals. In any case, for the second championship series ever held by the ABL, the Brooklyn Celtics would end up sweeping the Brooklyn Arcadians 3–0, with the Celtics playing their decisive third and final game at their home venue at the Arcadia Hall that was used throughout the entire season for both the original Brooklyn Arcadians team and the Celtics team within the ABL (as well as their brief time spent in the rivaling NBL).

ABL Championship
1st Half Winner	Cleveland Rosenblums	21	20	32
2nd Half Winner	Brooklyn Celtics	29	28	35

- Bold Series winner

== Statistics ==
By the end of the season, Rusty Saunders of the Washington Palace Five would end up being the leading scorer of the entire league for the second straight season in a row with 399 points scored for an average of 9.5 points per game. Unlike the previous season, however, in terms of points per game averages, however, only Bennie Borgmann of the Fort Wayne Hoosiers would end up recording more points per game this season, as he'd surprisingly score a rather high (for the time) 11.2 points per game for a close 380 total points scored (with him only playing in 34 games that season as opposed to the full 42 games for this regular season).

== See also ==
- American Basketball League
