= 1927–28 American Basketball League season =

1927–28 ABL season
- League: American Basketball League
- Sport: Basketball
- Duration: 1927 – March 25, 1928; March 13–16, 1928 (Playoffs); March 21–25, 1928 (Finals)
- Games: 49–52
- Teams: 8 (until January 3, 1928); 7 (after January 3, 1928)

Regular season
- Season champions: New York Original Celtics
- Top seed: New York Original Celtics
- Top scorer: Harry Topel (Rochester Centrals)

Playoffs
- Eastern champions: New York Original Celtics
- Eastern runners-up: Philadelphia Warriors
- Western champions: Fort Wayne Hoosiers
- Western runners-up: Cleveland Rosenblums

World Series
- Venue: Madison Square Garden, New York City, New York; South Side High School Gymnasium, Fort Wayne, Indiana
- Champions: New York Original Celtics
- Runners-up: Fort Wayne Hoosiers

ABL seasons
- ← 1926–27 1928–29 →

The 1927–28 ABL season was the third season of the original rendition of the American Basketball League (ABL). It was also the first and only season during its original rendition in particular where the ABL would ditch the split season formatting that the league would use throughout most of its history and utilize a proper regular season format with divisions used (with a regular Eastern Division and Western Division in place) and the implementation of what would later be known as the Shaughnessy playoff system for the two best teams of each division competing against each other in the semifinal round for a shot at the championship instead of the prior championship system used where the two best teams from each half-season would compete in a championship series to determine the overall winner of the season. While it's currently unknown when the regular season would begin or end for the ABL, their playoffs would begin on March 13, 1928, and end twelve days later on March 25, 1928, with the New York Original Celtics winning their second straight championship over the Fort Wayne Hoosiers 3–1. This would also be their final championship won as a whole, as the Naismith Basketball Hall of Fame franchise would forcefully be broken up by the league (and subsequently being out of the league for its 1928–29 season) due to a combination of the (original) team's owner dealing with a prison sentence for embezzlement and the ABL growing concerned over the long-term success of their league (both in terms of finances and in quality of play throughout the rest of the league) following the constant success of the Original Celtics franchise throughout the 1920s decade.

== Teams ==
Entering this season, the Baltimore Orioles basketball team would drop out of the league and go defunct as a franchise not long afterward, with a new team in Detroit, Michigan through the Detroit Cardinals / Olympians (the team has been known as both the Cardinals and the Olympians throughout the season) being added as an official replacement for the prior Detroit Pulaski Post Five / Lions team that went defunct early on in the previous season to have four viable teams in each division to start out the season. Not only that, but the defending champion Brooklyn Celtics would go back to their Original Celtics properly, though they would also add the New York distinction to become the New York Original Celtics in order to display where they were located this time around. However, by January 3, 1928, both the Detroit Cardinals / Olympians and the Washington Palace Five would end up going defunct as franchises, though in the case of the Palace Five team, they would end up being replaced with a technical merger through the now-former Metropolitan Basketball League (and previously, the "original" National Basketball League) team known as the Brooklyn Visitations from Brooklyn, New York for the rest of the season (with the Visitations taking on the record that Washington held at the time) to oddly have four teams in the Eastern Division and three teams in the Western Division for the rest of the season going forward (though the ABL would not erase the record of this Detroit squad following their departure this time around).

Western Division	Chicago Bruins Chicago, Illinois	Cleveland Rosenblums Cleveland, Ohio
Western Division	Detroit Cardinals / Olympians Detroit, Michigan	Fort Wayne Hoosiers Fort Wayne, Indiana
Eastern Division	New York Original Celtics New York City, New York	Philadelphia Warriors Philadelphia, Pennsylvania
Eastern Division	Rochester Centrals Rochester, New York	Washington Palace Five Washington, D.C.
Eastern Division	Brooklyn Visitations Brooklyn, New York	

Coaching changes
Offseason
Team	1926–27 coach	1927–28 coach
Chicago Bruins	Garry Schmeelk (player-coach)	Honey Russell (player-coach)
Cleveland Rosenblums	Marty Friedman (player-coach)	Dave Kerr (player-coach)
Fort Wayne Hoosiers	Ralph Miller & Bennie Borgmann (player-coaches)	Ralph Miller (player-coach)
Rochester Centrals	John Murphy (player-coach)	Nick Harvey (player-coach)
In-season
Team	Outgoing coach	Incoming coach
Fort Wayne Hoosiers	Ralph Miller (player-coach)	Pop Morgenweck
Rochester Centrals	Nick Harvey (player-coach)	John Murphy (player-coach)
Washington Palace Five / Brooklyn Visitations	Ray Kennedy (Washington's player-coach)	John Donlan (Brooklyn's head coach)

== Preseason ==
Before starting this season out, the ABL decided to replace the split season format that they used for the past two seasons with a proper regular season format that involved divisional formatting with four teams in each division. Not only that, but the ABL would implement a new "five fouls and out" policy where after five fouls held during a game, the player would be out of commission for the rest of the match not long afterward.

== Regular season ==
After the end of the 1927 year saw who the immediate playoff threats and who the likely eliminated squads would be for both divisions, the date of January 3, 1928 would see two different ABL teams in each division in the Detroit Cardinals / Olympians (with the Detroit Cardinals potentially being renamed to the Detroit Olympians during the season) and the Washington Palace Five squads both officially leaving the ABL entirely. At the same time, however, the Brooklyn Visitations from the soon-to-be-defunct Metropolitan Basketball League (and formerly from the "original" National Basketball League that looked to rival the ABL during the previous season) would end up entering the ABL in the place of the Washington Palace Five for the rest of the season, though the time spent for the squad that would technically be considered the "Washington Palace Five / Brooklyn Visitations" for this ABL season would be officially considered a merger for them instead of Brooklyn replacing Washington in the ABL's eyes; as for this Detroit squad, unlike the previous season, where the Detroit Pulaski Post Five / Lions team would have their record be purged from the official record books going forward into the season, the Detroit Cardinals / Olympians would not be replaced like the Washington Palace Five squad was, though they would not have their record purged this season either (meaning they would effectively be frozen for a fourth-place finish to have the Cleveland Rosenblums and Fort Wayne Hoosiers become the top two best teams in the Western Division by default since Detroit was in third place at the time). While the Western Division would more or less be set in stone on which two teams would compete in the ABL Playoffs this season, the Eastern Division would be more dramatic throughout the season regarding who outside of the defending champion New York Original Celtics would be joining alongside them for the playoff picture. In the end, it would be decided that the Philadelphia Warriors team that had been considered serious rivals to the Original Celtics at the time would be joining the Celtics (who had the best overall record in the league this season at 40–9) as the top two teams in the Eastern Division, while the Fort Wayne Hoosiers would bounce back in the second half of the season to claim the #1 spot in the Western Division above the Cleveland Rosenblums this time around. Unfortunately for the ABL, the regular season's production would also result in the league seeing poorer financial results than they had expected both in terms of the Original Celtics and especially in terms of matches that would not involve them, to the point where there would be some writers expressing serious concerns on whether the ABL would continue to exist for another season as it would be.

== Final standings ==
=== Eastern Division ===
Eastern Division
Team	Wins	Losses	Winning %
New York (Original) Celtics	40	9	.816
Philadelphia Warriors	30	21	.588
Washington Palace Five / Brooklyn Visitations*	25	26	.490
Rochester Centrals	24	28	.462

* – The Washington Palace Five franchise would have their franchise rights and record be transferred out to the Brooklyn Visitations by January 3, 1928, for the unofficial second half of the season.

=== Western Division ===
Western Division
Team	Wins	Losses	Winning %
Fort Wayne Hoosiers	27	24	.529
Cleveland Rosenblums	22	29	.431
Chicago Bruins	13	36	.265
Detroit Cardinals / Olympians†	5	13	.278

† – Withdrew from the ABL on January 3, 1928, by the start of the unofficial second half of the season.

== Playoffs ==
Unlike the first two seasons played in the American Basketball League, this season would see the ABL utilize what would later be known as the Shaughnessy playoff system for the two best teams of each division competing against each other with a best-of-three semifinal round before the remaining teams had a shot at the championship (dubbed as the World Series for basketball at the time) with a best-of-five series. In the Eastern Division Playoffs, the rebranded New York Original Celtics would sweep the Philadelphia Warriors 2–0 in their playoff series match-up. As for the Western Division Playoffs, the Fort Wayne Hoosiers (the only winning team in the Western Division this season) would also sweep the Cleveland Rosenblums (who ended their season with a 22–29 record) 2–0 in their playoff series match-up. With the championship series (which was still considered the World Series for the ABL at the time), the New York Original Celtics would repeat as champions of the ABL (and by extension, the entirety of professional basketball as a whole) by winning 3–1 over the Fort Wayne Hoosiers (though The Philadelphia Inquirer would erroneously claim the Celtics won the series 2–1 and never properly corrected it during the time the following ABL championship game occurred).

Division Playoffs
E1	New York Original Celtics	2
E2	Philadelphia Warriors	0
W1	Fort Wayne Hoosiers	2
W2	Cleveland Rosenblums	0

ABL Championship
E1	New York Original Celtics	3
W1	Fort Wayne Hoosiers	1

- Bold Series winner

== Statistics ==
By the end of the season, Harry Topel would end up being the leading scorer of the entire league in its third season of existence (and the first time someone outside of Rusty Saunders would earn that honor) with 438 points scored for an average of 8.4 points per game. Additionally, this was also technically the first season in the ABL's history where the leading scorer of the league also had the highest points per game average throughout the season, though he would also be tied with Davey Banks from the New York Original Celtics with 8.4 points per game for a total of 412 points scored in 49 games played that season.

== See also ==
- American Basketball League
