= 1925–26 Boston Whirlwinds season =

- League: American Basketball League (original)
- Head coach: Fiddle Morley (player-coach)
- General manager: Fiddle Morley(?); Sam Snyder(?)
- Owner(s): Sam Snyder
- Arena: Boston Arena; Mechanics Hall; Mount Benedict Knights of Columbus Hall

Results
- Record: 6–10 (.375)
- Place: Conference: T–6th (1st half)
- Playoff finish: Did not qualify (Expelled from the ABL over player dispute contracts.)

The 1925–26 Boston Whirlwinds season was the first and only professional basketball season of play for the Boston Whirlwinds franchise in the capital city of Boston, Massachusetts under the American Basketball League, which was the first professional basketball league that had truly attempted to go fully national after previous professional basketball leagues were mostly regional at the time. Despite the Whirlwinds previously playing for as early as at least 1921 and as late as at least 1935, they would end up being one of nine teams to join the newly created league for its inaugural season (while a tenth team in East Liverpool, Ohio was intended to join the Whirlwinds and the other eight teams in question for this season, the East Liverpool team ultimately withdrew operations before the season even began properly, with other failed locations that had submitted entries to start the ABL's inaugural season including Baltimore, Maryland (who eventually got their own team the following season); Milwaukee, Wisconsin; and two more locations in the state of Ohio via Columbus and Camden) in an attempt to have a truly national, professional basketball league. When the Whirlwinds played their first half of the season, the Boston squad ended up playing the first half of what would be the ABL's split season formatting with a 6–10 record, which would not only result in them tying up with the Chicago Bruins and the Detroit Pulaski Post Five squad for a sixth place finish, but also have them be ahead of only the Buffalo Bisons in terms of placements throughout that half of the season. However, before the second half of the season began for the ABL, players within the Boston Whirlwinds would end up getting into a dispute over the player contracts they got with the league. That alongside poor attendance on their ends throughout the season (which partially stemmed from them being all over the place in terms of home venues this season) resulted in them being expelled from the ABL before the second half of the ABL's inaugural season began (although some resources say they withdrew operations there instead) on February 11, 1926 (though reports first surfaced on them leaving by as early as February 9, 1926 (if not earlier in that month) instead), which left the ABL with only eight competing teams for that half of the season instead of the original nine teams that they had when starting that season out, with the aforementioned Buffalo Bisons later leaving the ABL by the end of the season to have only seven of the inaugural ABL teams remaining intact by the end of the season. While the Whirlwinds would continue playing as an independent basketball team throughout the rest of the 1920s and a good amount of the 1930s, they would never attempt to become a professional basketball franchise properly ever again going forward in their history.

== Roster ==
Due to information on American Basketball League players being generally hard to find, there are bound to be more gaps and/or inaccuracies found in certain areas on the team's roster spots than usual.

Player	Position
Whitey Bernot	F
Johnny Curtin	F
Snooks Dowd	F
Dutch Guenther	F
Earl Heal	G
Nate Hurwitz	F
Henry Kiley	G
Leo Martin	C
Fiddle Morley	G/F
Lou Schneiderman	G/F

Note: In addition to those guys, there were also missing players with the last names of Connolly and Nash on the team as well (with two more guys with the last names of Burnett and Dodd also being missing as well, though it's assumed that those two players in question were Whitey Bernot and Snooks Dowd respectively, with a player with the last name of Jenkins presumed to be Percy Jenkins for good measure).

== American Basketball League Standings ==
First Half
Team	Wins	Losses	Winning %
Brooklyn Arcadians	12	4	.750
Washington Palace Five / Laundrymen	11	5	.688
Cleveland Rosenblums	10	6	.625
Rochester Centrals	9	7	.562
Fort Wayne Caseys	7	9	.438
Boston Whirlwinds^{×}	6	10	.375
Chicago Bruins	6	10	.375
Detroit Pulaski Post Five	6	10	.375
Buffalo Bisons / Germans	5	11	.322

× – The Boston Whirlwinds were expelled by the end of the first half of the season due to a dispute over player contracts.

Second Half
Team	Wins	Losses	Winning %
Cleveland Rosenblums	13	1	.919
Washington Palace Five / Laundrymen	11	3	.786
Rochester Centrals	9	5	.643
Brooklyn Arcadians	7	7	.500
Fort Wayne Caseys	6	8	.429
Buffalo Bisons / Germans	5	9	.357
Chicago Bruins	3	11	.214
Detroit Pulaski Post Five	2	12	.143
