= 1926–27 Washington Palace Five season =

- League: American Basketball League (original)
- Head coach: Ray Kennedy (player-coach)
- General manager: George Preston Marshall
- Owner(s): George Preston Marshall
- Arena: Turner's Arena

Results
- Record: 30–12 (.714)
- Place: Conference: 2nd (1st half); 3rd (2nd half)
- Playoff finish: Did not qualify

The 1926–27 Washington Palace Five season was the second (and final full) professional basketball season played for the Palace Five team (which sometimes were shortened down more properly to the Laundrymen or even the Palacians as a more proper team name due to the Palace Five name being a shorthand for George Preston Marshall's local Washington Palace Laundry laundromat business) in Washington, D.C. alongside the second season of existence as a professional franchise and the second season of existence for the American Basketball League, which was the first professional basketball league that had truly attempted to go fully national after previous professional basketball leagues were mostly regional at the time. For the second straight season in a row, the American Basketball League would start out their season with nine teams competing in the split season formatting, with the two half seasons being utilized instead of one whole season being utilized throughout the entire season (which would be the case throughout the majority of the league's existence in the first place). However, unlike the previous season of play, when the ABL was looking to prove its status as a truly national professional basketball league can be successful for the sport as a whole, this season would see some unintended sabotage occurring within the offseason due to the creation of another rivaling professional basketball league named the National Basketball League (which wouldn't be related to the National Basketball League that would eventually be considered a predecessor to the present day National Basketball Association, but instead were essentially a rebranded version of the technically rivaling Metropolitan Basketball League that the Original Celtics franchise had intended to join at first before declining due to how few games and how tiny the venues they had to play in were this time around), which would end up stealing away talented players from all three of the Washington Palace Five / Laundrymen, the Detroit Pulaski Post Five (who might have renamed themselves to just being the Detroit Lions basketball team during the early points of the season), and the Brooklyn Arcadians franchises. However, in order for the Washington Palace Five franchise to make up for the sudden unexpected losses they had upon their team during the offseason period, George Preston Marshall would end up taking players away from both the Brooklyn and Detroit squads in order to try and replenish his team to be as talented as they could be for the upcoming ABL season, which left both the Arcadians and the Pulaski Post Five / Lions teams with stripped bare rosters to start out the season. While the Washington Palace Five franchise would end up remaining competitive for this season in spite of the awkward circumstances that were beyond their control that they went up against, that awful combination of luck would still lead to all three of the Brooklyn Arcadians, the Detroit Pulaski Post Five / Lions, and the newly added Baltimore Orioles basketball team with winless squads to start out the season, which forced the ABL to go into strongman mode to help revitalize the league back to what it was going to be before the surprise takeover by the ("original") NBL began; to do that, the 0–5 Arcadians would end up joining the 0–6 Detroit squad as the only two ABL teams to effectively withdraw their operations from the league entirely, though the Brooklyn Arcadians would at least see some sort of consolation occur with the Original Celtics (who had originally planned on entering the ABL at the time alongside the Baltimore Orioles and the Philadelphia Quakers / Phillies that later became the Philadelphia Sphas operating as the Philadelphia Warriors before the Celtics ultimately defected from it into the rivaling NBL since the Celtics were more reluctant to join the ABL at the time) taking on the spot the Arcadians had in the league for the rest of the season going forward (although the Celtics would inherit the disadvantageous record the Arcadians had for just the first half of the season) as opposed to having their records be stricken away completely from the league's history like the Detroit franchise had to deal with on their ends.

== Roster ==
Due to information on American Basketball League players being generally hard to find, there are bound to be more gaps and/or inaccuracies found in certain areas on the team's roster spots than usual.

1926–27 Washington Palace Five / Laundrymen roster
Players

Pos.	No.	Player	Height	Weight	DOB	From
F/C		Gaza Chizmadia	6 ft 2 in (1.88 m)	185 lb (84 kg)	1906-01-12	No college
G/F		George Glasco	5 ft 10 in (1.78 m)	150 lb (68 kg)	1901-04-07	No college
G		Teddy Kearns	5 ft 11 in (1.80 m)	180 lb (82 kg)	1900-01-01	Perkiomen Prep School (NJ)
G		Ray Kennedy	5 ft 9 in (1.75 m)	160 lb (73 kg)	1893-10-10	Manhattan
G		Henry Kiley	6 ft 1 in (1.85 m)	185 lb (84 kg)	1904-11-14	No college
F/C		Stretch Miller	6 ft 3 in (1.91 m)	200 lb (91 kg)	1901-03-07	Illinois State Normal
G		Elmer Ripley	5 ft 7 in (1.70 m)	150 lb (68 kg)	1891-07-21	Brown
G/F		Rusty Saunders	6 ft 2 in (1.88 m)	210 lb (95 kg)	1906-03-12	Central HS (NJ)
F		Dick Smyth	6 ft 0 in (1.83 m)	175 lb (79 kg)	1894-02-18	No college
C		Tillie Voss	6 ft 3 in (1.91 m)	205 lb (93 kg)	1897-03-28	Detroit
G/F		Freddie Wesslock	5 ft 10 in (1.78 m)	175 lb (79 kg)	1905-10-20	No college

Coaches
Head coach

Ray Kennedy

Legend
- (DP) Unsigned draft pick
- (FA) Free agent
- (S) Suspended
- Injured

== American Basketball League Standings ==
First Half
Team	Wins	Losses	Winning %
Cleveland Rosenblums	17	4	.810
Washington Palace Five / Laundrymen	16	5	.762
Philadelphia Quakers / Phillies*	14	7	.667
Brooklyn Arcadians/Brooklyn Celtics**	13	8	.619
Rochester Centrals	8	13	.381
Fort Wayne Hoosiers	8	13	.381
Chicago Bruins	7	14	.333
Baltimore Orioles	1	20	.048
Detroit Pulaski Post Five / Lions†	0	6	.000

* – The Philadelphia Sphas would replace the Philadelphia Quakers during the second half of the season, albeit while playing under the original Philadelphia Warriors name instead of their typical Philadelphia SPHAs name.
** – After playing only in five total games this season (all of which ended in defeats), the Brooklyn Arcadians would have their franchise rights be both transferred and replaced by the Original Celtics franchise under the temporarily implemented name of the Brooklyn Celtics for the rest of this season in the ABL.
† – Withdrew from the ABL after playing only six total games during the first half of this season, with their games being stricken from the official league record books during this season.

Second Half
Team	Wins	Losses	Winning %
Brooklyn Celtics*	19	2	.905
Fort Wayne Hoosiers	15	6	.714
Washington Palace Five / Laundrymen	14	7	.667
Philadelphia Warriors**	10	11	.476
Cleveland Rosenblums	9	12	.429
Rochester Centrals	6	15	.286
Chicago Bruins	6	15	.286
Baltimore Orioles	5	16	.238

* – After playing only five total games this season (all of which ended in defeats), the Brooklyn Arcadians would have their franchise rights be both transferred and replaced by the Original Celtics franchise under the temporarily implemented name of the Brooklyn Celtics for the rest of this season in the ABL.
** – The Philadelphia Sphas would replace the Philadelphia Quakers during the second half of the season, albeit while playing under the original Philadelphia Warriors name instead of their typical Philadelphia SPHAs name.

== Awards and honors ==
By the end of the season, Rusty Saunders would end up being the leading scorer of the entire league for the second straight season in a row with 399 points scored for an average of 9.5 points per game.
