= 1927–28 Washington Palace Five season =

- League: American Basketball League (original)
- Head coach: Ray Kennedy (player-coach)
- General manager: George Preston Marshall
- Owner(s): George Preston Marshall
- Arena: Turner's Arena

Results
- Record: 7–15 (.318)
- Place: Division: N/A (3rd/4th) (Eastern)
- Playoff finish: Did not qualify (Dropped out of the ABL on January 3, 1928 to merge operations with the Brooklyn Visitations for the rest of the season.)

The 1927–28 Washington Palace Five season was the both third and final professional basketball season played for the Palace Five team (which sometimes were shortened down more properly to the Laundrymen or even the Palacians as a more proper team name due to the Palace Five name being a shorthand for George Preston Marshall's local Washington Palace Laundry laundromat business) in Washington, D.C. and the third season of existence for the American Basketball League, which was the first professional basketball league that had truly attempted to go fully national after previous professional basketball leagues were mostly regional at the time. For the first season ever in the league's history (and the only time in its inaugural period of existence), the ABL would abandon its split season formatting to have one whole regular season of play, with the eight teams there competing in two divisions of four teams each (with Washington competing in the Eastern Division alongside teams like the Original Celtics (labeled as the New York (Original) Celtics during this season), the Philadelphia Warriors, and the Rochester Centrals). Unfortunately for the Palace Five team, to start out their season, they would end up playing a few of their games against the defending ABL champions, the Original Celtics, early into the season, being one of only two teams alongside the Philadelphia Warriors to play against the defending champions so often on a consistent basis early on into the season. Not only that, but despite the Laundrymen finally being able to defeat the Original Celtics in a match for the first time in over 14 tries with a 30–25 victory, attendance issues would lead to George Preston Marshall essentially moving operations out into the city of Brooklyn, New York during the season on January 4, 1928. However, because the Brooklyn Visitations wanted to exit out of the rivaling (and later, soon to be defunct) Metropolitan Basketball League and enter the ABL during that exact same period of time, the ABL would arrange for the Visitations to take over as the replacement team for the Washington Palace Five team for the rest of the season going forward (including Washington's last place spot in their division at the time), with the Visitations effectively replacing the Palace Five team in everything during that same period of time (including potentially having George Preston Marshall being involved with the Visitations' ownership for that season). Because of that sudden change, the Washington Palace Five would essentially end their part of the season in the ABL with a poor 7–15 that would essentially warrant a last place finish in the Eastern Division on its own accord, similar to that of the defunct Detroit Cardinals / Olympians in the Western Division. Despite that notion, however, when combining their record with that of the Brooklyn Visitations' record for the rest of the season in the 1928 year there, the overall record would be a much better (albeit still below-average) 25–26 record that had them finish in third place behind both the Philadelphia Warriors and the eventual champion New York (Original) Celtics.

== Roster ==
Due to information on American Basketball League players being generally hard to find, there are bound to be more gaps and/or inaccuracies found in certain areas on the team's roster spots than usual. However, similar to the Original Celtics' only two seasons of play in the Eastern Basketball League alongside their first season in the ABL, the Washington Palace Five's original roster that was participating in the American Basketball League at the time is completely different from the Brooklyn Visitations, who were an entirely different team that started out their original season was in the (original) Metropolitan Basketball League before entering the ABL as the replacement for the Washington Palace Five by comparison.

1927–28 Washington Palace Five / Laundrymen roster
Players

Pos.	No.	Player	Height	Weight	DOB	From
C		Jude Baseman	6 ft 5 in (1.96 m)	205 lb (93 kg)	1897-09-13	No college
G/F		Willie Boub	5 ft 8 in (1.73 m)	155 lb (70 kg)	1896-09-30	No college
F/C		Gaza Chizmadia	6 ft 2 in (1.88 m)	185 lb (84 kg)	1906-01-12	No college
G/F		Red Conaty	5 ft 11 in (1.80 m)	160 lb (73 kg)	1904-02-12	St. Francis College
C		Swede Grimstead	6 ft 3 in (1.91 m)	190 lb (86 kg)	1891-03-23	No college
C		Mark Harper	6 ft 4 in (1.93 m)	220 lb (100 kg)	1904-08-11	No college
G		Ray Kennedy	5 ft 9 in (1.75 m)	160 lb (73 kg)	1893-10-10	Manhattan
G/F		Howie Meyers	5 ft 8 in (1.73 m)	160 lb (73 kg)	1907-08-03	Technical HS (PA)
G/F		Chickie Passon	5 ft 7 in (1.70 m)	165 lb (75 kg)	1900-05-30	Penn
G		Elmer Ripley	5 ft 7 in (1.70 m)	150 lb (68 kg)	1891-07-21	Brown
G/F		Rusty Saunders	6 ft 2 in (1.88 m)	210 lb (95 kg)	1906-03-12	Central HS (NJ)
G		Lou Schneiderman	5 ft 8 in (1.73 m)	150 lb (68 kg)	1899-01-10	No college

Coaches
Head coach

Ray Kennedy

Legend
- (DP) Unsigned draft pick
- (FA) Free agent
- (S) Suspended
- Injured

== American Basketball League Standings ==
=== Eastern Division ===
Eastern Division
Team	Wins	Losses	Winning %
New York (Original) Celtics	40	9	.816
Brooklyn Visitations*	18	11	.621
Philadelphia Warriors	30	21	.588
Washington Palace Five (/ Laundrymen) / Brooklyn Visitations*	25	26	.490
Rochester Centrals	24	28	.462
Washington Palace Five*	7	15	.318

* – The Washington Palace Five / Laundrymen franchise would have their franchise rights and record be transferred out to the Brooklyn Visitations by January 3, 1928 for the unofficial second half of the season. The placements for the Washington Palace Five / Laundrymen team and the Brooklyn Visitations team would be the unofficial placements for the ABL this season had they competed as their own squads during this season.

=== Western Division ===
Western Division
Team	Wins	Losses	Winning %
Fort Wayne Hoosiers	27	24	.529
Cleveland Rosenblums	22	29	.431
Chicago Bruins	13	36	.265
Detroit Cardinals / Olympians†	5	13	.278

† – Withdrew from the ABL on January 3, 1928 by the start of the unofficial second half of the season.
