= 1925–26 Buffalo Bisons season =

- League: American Basketball League (original)
- Head coach: Alfred Heerdt
- General manager: Alfred Heerdt
- Owner(s): Alfred Heerdt
- Arena: German YMCA

Results
- Record: 10–20 (.333)
- Place: Conference: 9th (1st half); 6th (2nd half)
- Playoff finish: Did not qualify

The 1925–26 Buffalo Bisons season was the first and only professional basketball season of play for the original Buffalo Bisons ABL team in the city of Buffalo, New York under the original version of the American Basketball League, which was the first professional basketball league that had truly attempted to go fully national after previous professional basketball leagues were mostly regional at the time. However, unlike most other teams that entered the ABL at the time of its creation, the Buffalo Bisons franchise technically existed as either a continuation or a second generation version of the famous, Naismith Basketball Hall of Fame worthy Buffalo Germans franchise that previously existed as early as 1895 (only four years after James Naismith created the sport of basketball itself), which would technically make this something akin to their 30th season of play instead. As such, the Buffalo Bisons were also sometimes referred to as the Buffalo Germans throughout the season instead due to their prior history to/continuation of their historic Buffalo Germans franchise that had previously walloped and destroyed teams that were considered unworthy of their presence by comparison to what other historic, Hall of Fame worthy teams like the Original Celtics or the all-black New York Renaissance (or even the later Harlem Globetrotters) would do (even if the Buffalo Germans of that era could ultimately be considered an amateur franchise by comparison to what teams that were in prior professional basketball leagues of the time were like). Unfortunately for the Bisons franchise, this version of the team would not have the same historic presence or power that those previous Buffalo teams would have once they decided to enter the ABL to become a professional basketball franchise.

The American Basketball League's inaugural season would have nine teams competing in that season (while a tenth team in East Liverpool, Ohio was intended to join the Bisons and the other eight teams in question for this season, the East Liverpool team ultimately withdrew operations before the season even began properly, with other failed locations that had submitted entries to start the ABL's inaugural season including Baltimore, Maryland (who eventually got their own team the following season); Milwaukee, Wisconsin; and two more locations in the state of Ohio via Columbus and Camden, with Buffalo oddly not being one of the inaugural teams to enter at the time), though the ABL would compete in a split season format with two half seasons being utilized instead of one whole season being utilized throughout the season (which would be the case throughout the majority of the league's existence in the first place). However, by the time the first half of the season ended and the second half of the season began, the Boston Whirlwinds would officially be expelled from the ABL on February 11, 1926 due to a dispute over player contracts (though some sources claim they withdrew from the ABL instead due to poor attendance numbers for their home games), which led to the ABL entering the second half of the season with only eight teams remaining in their league this time around. In any case, the first season for the season would result in an especially poor start for the Buffalo Bisons due to them finishing that half of the season with a last place finish through a 5–11 record, being behind even the later expelled Boston Whirlwinds, who had gotten into a three-way tie for sixth place for that half of the season alongside both the Chicago Bruins and the Detroit Pulaski Post Five. While the Bisons would at least perform a little bit better for the second half of the season, finishing that half of the season with a sixth place finish instead of a dead last ninth place finish, they would still end up having a losing record with a 5–9 record for that half of the season and fail to qualify for the ABL's playoffs (which would just be a championship series) in the process, which later led to them exiting out of the ABL entirely for good.

While this was officially the only season of play in the ABL for the Buffalo Bisons (with the ABL later having a few successful seasons of their own accord before suspending operations in 1931 due to the Great Depression and later returning to operations under a lesser sort of form from 1933 up until 1953, technically speaking), the Bisons would later end up continuing to exist for one season each in the Midwest Basketball Conference and the National Basketball League, with the former league having them showcase one of the first African American players to ever play in an integrated professional basketball league at the time and the latter league eventually merging operations with the Basketball Association of America to become the present-day National Basketball Association. Not only that, but the Bisons' history would also be even more complex following their exit from the ABL, as they would potentially have seasons of play where they would end up playing as both the Buffalo Lincolns and the Buffalo Drydocks, as well as even have one season where the team ended up playing in the New York State Basketball League in the season before they officially played in the Midwest Basketball Conference.

== Roster ==
Due to information on American Basketball League players being generally hard to find, there are bound to be more gaps and/or inaccuracies found in certain areas on the team's roster spots than usual.

Player	Position
Honey Anowski	G/F
Tom Berry	F/C
Joe Brown	G
Sibby Cortelli	G/F
Teddy Feldt	G/F
Cleon Hyde	F/C
Ray Knapp	F/C
Bert Lewis	F/C
Dip Murray	G/F
Jiggs O'Dell	G/F
Main Rich	G/F
George Schell	G/F
Carl Wedell	G/F

== American Basketball League Standings ==
First Half
Team	Wins	Losses	Winning %
Brooklyn Arcadians	12	4	.750
Washington Palace Five / Laundrymen	11	5	.688
Cleveland Rosenblums	10	6	.625
Rochester Centrals	9	7	.562
Fort Wayne Caseys	7	9	.438
Chicago Bruins	6	10	.375
Detroit Pulaski Post Five	6	10	.375
Boston Whirlwinds^{×}	6	10	.375
Buffalo Bisons / Germans	5	11	.322

× – The Boston Whirlwinds were expelled by the end of the first half of the season due to a dispute over player contracts.

Second Half
Team	Wins	Losses	Winning %
Cleveland Rosenblums	13	1	.919
Washington Palace Five / Laundrymen	11	3	.786
Rochester Centrals	9	5	.643
Brooklyn Arcadians	7	7	.500
Fort Wayne Caseys	6	8	.429
Buffalo Bisons / Germans	5	9	.357
Chicago Bruins	3	11	.214
Detroit Pulaski Post Five	2	12	.143
