= 1926–27 Detroit Lions season =

- League: American Basketball League (original)
- Head coach: Jimmy Conzelman (player-coach)
- Owner(s): John F. Brobowski & B. L. Schulte
- Arena: Light Guard Armory

Results
- Record: 0–6 (.000)
- Place: Conference: N/A (9th (1st half))
- Playoff finish: Did not qualify (Folded operations on December 23, 1926.)

The 1926–27 Detroit Lions season was the second and final professional basketball season played by the Detroit Lions in Detroit, Michigan, competing in the original American Basketball League (ABL), the first professional basketball league to attempt a fully national structure. The team began the season as the Detroit Pulaski Post Five (also referred to as the Pulaski Post, the Pulaskis, or the Pulaski Post Lions) before renaming itself the Detroit Lions early in the campaign. For the second consecutive season, the ABL opened with nine teams competing under a split season format divided into two halves.

During the offseason, the creation of a rival National Basketball League (a rebranded version of the Metropolitan Basketball League, unrelated to the later National Basketball League that preceded the National Basketball Association) drew away several players from the Pulaski Post Five, the Brooklyn Arcadians, and the Washington Palace Five / Laundrymen. In addition, Washington owner George Preston Marshall signed players away from both Detroit and Brooklyn to strengthen his own roster, leaving both franchises severely depleted entering the season.

As a result, Detroit, Brooklyn, and the expansion Baltimore Orioles all opened the season winless. After starting 0–6, Detroit folded its operations on December 23, 1926, and withdrew from the ABL, with its games stricken from the league's official standings. The 0–5 Brooklyn Arcadians also ceased operations, though their franchise rights were transferred to the Original Celtics—who had initially planned to join the ABL alongside Baltimore and the Philadelphia Quakers / Phillies before briefly defecting to the rival NBL. Competing as the Brooklyn Celtics, the Celtics inherited Brooklyn's first-half record and went on to win the second half and the ABL championship, while Detroit sat out the second half (much as the Boston Whirlwinds had done in the league's inaugural season). Although the Pulaski Post Five / Lions franchise never returned, Detroit rejoined the ABL the following season with the Detroit Cardinals / Olympians.

== Roster ==
The following players appeared for Detroit during the 1926–27 season:

Player	Position
Hal Bejin	G
Jimmy Conzelman	G/F
Joe Dermody	F
Bill Henderson	F/C
Reese Jones	C
Eddie Lynch	G
Bruno Smokiewicz	G
Aus Unger	G/F

== American Basketball League standings ==
First Half
Team	Wins	Losses	Winning %
Cleveland Rosenblums	17	4	.810
Washington Palace Five / Laundrymen	16	5	.762
Philadelphia Quakers / Phillies*	14	7	.667
Brooklyn Arcadians/Brooklyn Celtics**	13	8	.619
Fort Wayne Hoosiers	8	13	.381
Rochester Centrals	8	13	.381
Chicago Bruins	7	14	.333
Baltimore Orioles	1	20	.048
Detroit Pulaski Post Five / Lions†	0	6	.000

* – The Philadelphia Sphas would replace the Philadelphia Quakers during the second half of the season, albeit while playing under the original Philadelphia Warriors name instead of their typical Philadelphia SPHAs name.
** – After playing only in five total games this season (all of which ended in defeats), the Brooklyn Arcadians would have their franchise rights be both transferred and replaced by the Original Celtics franchise under the temporarily implemented name of the Brooklyn Celtics for the rest of this season in the ABL.
† – Withdrew from the ABL after playing only six total games during the first half of this season, with their games being stricken from the official league record books during this season.

Second Half
Team	Wins	Losses	Winning %
Brooklyn Celtics*	19	2	.905
Fort Wayne Hoosiers	15	6	.714
Washington Palace Five / Laundrymen	14	7	.667
Philadelphia Warriors**	10	11	.476
Cleveland Rosenblums	9	12	.429
Chicago Bruins	6	15	.286
Rochester Centrals	6	15	.286
Baltimore Orioles	5	16	.238

* – After playing only five total games this season (all of which ended in defeats), the Brooklyn Arcadians would have their franchise rights be both transferred and replaced by the Original Celtics franchise under the temporarily implemented name of the Brooklyn Celtics for the rest of this season in the ABL.
** – The Philadelphia Sphas would replace the Philadelphia Quakers during the second half of the season, albeit while playing under the original Philadelphia Warriors name instead of their typical Philadelphia SPHAs name.
