= 1927–28 Detroit Cardinals / Olympians season =

- League: American Basketball League (original)
- Head coach: Jimmy Conzelman
- General manager: Charles A. Hughes
- Owner(s): The Townsend-Seyburn Group; Charles A. Hughes
- Arena: Light Guard Armory

Results
- Record: 5–13 (.278)
- Place: Division: N/A (4th) (Western)
- Playoff finish: Did not qualify (Dropped out of the ABL on January 3, 1928.)

The 1927–28 Detroit Cardinals / Olympians season was the first and only season of professional play for the Cardinals / Olympians franchise in the capital city of Detroit, Michigan under the third season of what would be the original version of the American Basketball League, which was the first professional basketball league that had truly attempted to go fully national after previous professional basketball leagues were mostly regional at the time. With that being said, despite this being the third straight season where a team from Detroit would compete within the ABL, the Detroit Cardinals / Olympians franchise would not be a continuation of the previous Detroit team that was in the ABL in its first two seasons in the Detroit Pulaski Post Five / Lions franchise that had been forcibly removed by the ABL following a poor start to their season following a raid by the since-defunct "original" National Basketball League. In any case, unlike the previous two seasons where the ABL operated under a split season format, the ABL would utilize a proper regular season format with four teams in each division (the Eastern Division and the Western Division (the latter being the division that Detroit is in)) that would essentially be the norm for the sport in other professional basketball leagues following this one going forward, with the two best teams in each division competing against each other in a proper playoff series before the remaining teams in question went up against each other in a proper championship series afterward. Unfortunately for this Detroit squad, they would end up performing as woefully in the ABL as the previous Detroit squad had performed in the previous two seasons of existence there. Following a doubleheader performance against the Philadelphia Warriors in the afternoon and evening of January 2, 1928 where Detroit would end up winning both of their games against the Warriors franchise, the Cardinals / Olympians franchise would end up withdrawing their operations from the ABL the following day on January 3 (with players there being free agents soon afterward) due to the lack of fan support throughout the season, which related to the team's losing record of 5–13 by 1927 and the start of 1928. While the failure of two straight professional basketball franchises for the city of Detroit marked the end of viable professional basketball teams for the city in its foreseeable future, the city would eventually see viable professional basketball return in a proper manner in other professional basketball leagues between the trio of the Detroit Eagles, Detroit Gems, and Detroit Vagabond Kings in the National Basketball League, the Detroit Falcons in the Basketball Association of America, and most successfully (and recently) of them all, the Detroit Pistons of the modern-day National Basketball Association.

== Roster ==
Due to information on American Basketball League players being generally hard to find, there are bound to be more gaps and/or inaccuracies found in certain areas on the team's roster spots than usual.

Player	Position
John Beckman	F
Buddy Bushman	G/F
Soup Campbell	G/F
Art Carty	G
Gaza Chizmadia	F/C
Teddy Feldt	G/F
Jimmy Gordon	G
Bob Grody	F/C
Frank Roxbury	F
Sid Sankovic	F
Frank Sibley	C
Frank Stuchbury	G
Tillie Voss	C

== American Basketball League Standings ==
=== Eastern Division ===
Eastern Division
Team	Wins	Losses	Winning %
New York (Original) Celtics	40	9	.816
Philadelphia Warriors	30	21	.588
Washington Palace Five (/ Laundrymen) / Brooklyn Visitations*	25	26	.490
Rochester Centrals	24	28	.462

* – The Washington Palace Five / Laundrymen franchise would have their franchise rights and record be transferred out to the Brooklyn Visitations by January 3, 1928 for the unofficial second half of the season.

=== Western Division ===
Western Division
Team	Wins	Losses	Winning %
Fort Wayne Hoosiers	27	24	.529
Cleveland Rosenblums	22	29	.431
Chicago Bruins	13	36	.265
Detroit Cardinals / Olympians†	5	13	.278

† – Withdrew from the ABL on January 3, 1928 by the start of the unofficial second half of the season.
