= 1925–26 Detroit Pulaski Post Five season =

- League: American Basketball League (original)
- Head coach: Tillie Voss (3–3); Bruno Smokiewicz (5–19)
- General manager: Tillie Voss(?); John F. Brobowski(?); B. L. Schulte(?)
- Owner(s): John F. Brobowski & B. L. Schulte
- Arena: Light Guard Armory

Results
- Record: 8–22 (.267)
- Place: Conference: T–6th (1st half); 8th (2nd half)
- Playoff finish: Did not qualify

The 1925–26 Detroit Pulaski Post Five season was the first and only full professional basketball season of play for the Pulaski Post Five team (who sometimes were shortened down to just the Pulaski Post, the Pulaskis, or even just the Pulaski) in the capital city of Detroit, Michigan under the original version of the American Basketball League, which was the first professional basketball league that had truly attempted to go fully national after previous professional basketball leagues were mostly regional at the time. The American Basketball League's inaugural season would have nine teams competing in that season (while a tenth team in East Liverpool, Ohio was intended to join the Detroit squad alongside the other eight teams in question for this season, the East Liverpool team ultimately withdrew operations before the season even began properly, with other failed locations that had submitted entries to start the ABL's inaugural season including Baltimore, Maryland (who eventually got their own team the following season); Milwaukee, Wisconsin; and two more locations in the state of Ohio via Columbus and Camden), though the ABL would compete in a split season format with two half seasons being utilized instead of one whole season being utilized throughout the season (which would be the case throughout the majority of the league's existence in the first place). However, by the time the first half of the season ended and the second half of the season began, the Boston Whirlwinds would be expelled from the ABL due to a dispute over player contracts, which led to the ABL entering the second half of the season with only eight teams remaining in their league this time around. In any case, the first season for the Pulaski Post Five franchise would end up being a poor one for the team, as player-coach Tillie Voss would be let go of after an average 3–3 start to the season and be replaced by a different player-coach in Bruno Smokiewicz for the rest of the season soon afterward. As a result of that move, the first half of the season would see Detroit get a below-average 6–10 record that had them tie both the Boston Whirlwinds (who had been expelled from the league at the end of the first half of the season due to player contract disputes) and the Chicago Bruins for a sixth-place finish that had them be ahead of only the Buffalo Bisons by one game from that half of the season. Unfortunately for the Pulaski Post Five squad, they would end up performing even worse in the second half of the season despite having one less team to worry about for that particular half of the season, as they finished it in dead last place with only two wins on their ends for a 2–12 record to essentially be the worst overall team in the ABL this season. While the Detroit Pulaski Post Five team would end up competing in the ABL for the following season afterward (though they would later change their team name to the Detroit Lions), they would end up facing offseason woes that would end up causing a premature demise to their franchise early on into that upcoming season.

== Roster ==
Due to information on American Basketball League players being generally hard to find, there are bound to be more gaps and/or inaccuracies found in certain areas on the team's roster spots than usual.

Player	Position
Roy Boosey	F
Art Carty	G
Tommy Clark	G/F
Joe Dermody	F
Gil Ely	G/F
Bruce Gregory	F
Bill Henderson	F/C
Bill Johnson	G
Joe Karpus	F
Eddie Lynch	G
Bill Murphy	G
Sam Siegel	F/C
Bruno Smokiewicz	G
Aus Unger	G/F
Tillie Voss	C

In addition to them, it was believed that someone named Glen Deitrick was also on the roster at one point in time as well, though he never officially played a single game for the team in the process.

== American Basketball League Standings ==
First Half
Team	Wins	Losses	Winning %
Brooklyn Arcadians	12	4	.750
Washington Palace Five / Laundrymen	11	5	.688
Cleveland Rosenblums	10	6	.625
Rochester Centrals	9	7	.562
Fort Wayne Caseys	7	9	.438
Detroit Pulaski Post Five	6	10	.375
Chicago Bruins	6	10	.375
Boston Whirlwinds^{×}	6	10	.375
Buffalo Bisons / Germans	5	11	.322

× – The Boston Whirlwinds were expelled by the end of the first half of the season due to a dispute over player contracts.

Second Half
Team	Wins	Losses	Winning %
Cleveland Rosenblums	13	1	.919
Washington Palace Five / Laundrymen	11	3	.786
Rochester Centrals	9	5	.643
Brooklyn Arcadians	7	7	.500
Fort Wayne Caseys	6	8	.429
Buffalo Bisons / Germans	5	9	.357
Chicago Bruins	3	11	.214
Detroit Pulaski Post Five	2	12	.143
