= 1927–28 Washington Palace Five / Brooklyn Visitations season =

- League: American Basketball League (original)
- Head coach: Ray Kennedy (Washington's player-coach); John Donlon (Brooklyn)
- General manager: George Preston Marshall (Washington); John Donlon (Brooklyn)
- Owner(s): George Preston Marshall (Washington); Unknown (Potentially John Donlon for Brooklyn)
- Arena: Turner's Arena (Washington); Grand Prospect Hall (Brooklyn)

Results
- Record: 25–26 (.490)
- Place: Division: 3rd (Eastern)
- Playoff finish: Did not qualify

The 1927–28 Washington Palace Five / Brooklyn Visitations season was the only professional basketball season played for what would end up being the merged operations between the Washington Palace Five team (sometimes referred to as the Laundrymen or even the Palacians as a more proper team name due to the Palace Five name being a shorthand for George Preston Marshall's local Washington Palace Laundry laundromat business) out in Washington, D.C. and the Brooklyn Visitations (formerly from the Metropolitan Basketball League) in Brooklyn, New York during the third season of existence for the American Basketball League, which was the first professional basketball league that had truly attempted to go fully national after previous professional basketball leagues were mostly regional at the time. For the first season ever in the league's history (and the only time in its inaugural period of existence), the ABL would abandon its split season formatting to have one whole regular season of play, with the eight teams there competing in two divisions of four teams each (with the Washington Palace Five later turned Brooklyn Visitations team competing in the Eastern Division alongside teams like the Original Celtics (labeled as the New York (Original) Celtics during this season), the Philadelphia Warriors, and the Rochester Centrals). Unfortunately for the Washington Palace Five team, to start out their season, they would end up playing a few of their games against the defending ABL champions, the Original Celtics, early into the season, being one of only two teams alongside the Philadelphia Warriors to play against the defending champions so often on a consistent basis early on into the season. Not only that, but despite the Laundrymen finally being able to defeat the Original Celtics in a match for the first time in over 14 tries with a 30–25 victory, attendance issues would lead to George Preston Marshall essentially moving operations out into the city of Brooklyn, New York during the season on January 4, 1928. However, because the Brooklyn Visitations wanted to exit out of the rivaling (and later, soon to be defunct) Metropolitan Basketball League and enter the ABL during that exact same period of time, the ABL would arrange for the Visitations to take over as the replacement team for the Washington Palace Five team for the rest of the season going forward (including Washington's last place spot in their division at the time), with the Visitations effectively replacing the Palace Five team in everything during that same period of time (including potentially having George Preston Marshall being involved with the Visitations' ownership for that season). This would essentially mark the second time in the ABL's history (as well as the final time in the ABL's original history) where a team would more or less survive operations by merging seasons together with another team, as the defending ABL champion Original Celtics technically entered the ABL season through a merger with a Brooklyn Arcadians to become the Brooklyn Celtics for the rest of that previous season there. Just like the previous season's merger between the Brooklyn Arcadians and Original Celtics, the technical merger between the Washington Palace Five and Brooklyn Visitations would have the Visitations enter with the poor 7–15 record that Washington had for the rest of the season going forward, with Brooklyn trying their best to overcome the disadvantageous spot that the Palace Five team gave to them early on in the season. While the Washington Palace Five ended their season with a poor 7–15 record, the Brooklyn Arcadians would finish the rest of their season with a much better 18–11 record to end the overall season with a below-average 25–26 record, which would not be enough to overtake the Philadelphia Warriors or the New York (Original) Celtics for a playoff spot in the ABL this season. Following this season's conclusion, the Brooklyn Visitations would operate in the ABL under their own name without any limitations completely affecting them there going forward, similar to what the Original Celtics had done this season in the ABL.

== Rosters ==
=== Washington Palace Five Roster ===
Due to information on American Basketball League players being generally hard to find, there are bound to be more gaps and/or inaccuracies found in certain areas on the team's roster spots than usual. However, similar to the Original Celtics' only two seasons of play in the Eastern Basketball League alongside their first season in the ABL, the Washington Palace Five's original roster that was participating in the American Basketball League at the time is completely different from the Brooklyn Visitations, who were an entirely different team that started out their original season was in the (original) Metropolitan Basketball League before entering the ABL by comparison. As such, the listing for the Washington roster will ultimately be different from that of the Visitations' roster below.

1927–28 Washington Palace Five / Laundrymen roster
Players

Pos.	No.	Player	Height	Weight	DOB	From
C		Jude Baseman	6 ft 5 in (1.96 m)	205 lb (93 kg)	1897-09-13	No college
G/F		Willie Boub	5 ft 8 in (1.73 m)	155 lb (70 kg)	1896-09-30	No college
F/C		Gaza Chizmadia	6 ft 2 in (1.88 m)	185 lb (84 kg)	1906-01-12	No college
G/F		Red Conaty	5 ft 11 in (1.80 m)	160 lb (73 kg)	1904-02-12	St. Francis College
C		Swede Grimstead	6 ft 3 in (1.91 m)	190 lb (86 kg)	1891-03-23	No college
C		Mark Harper	6 ft 4 in (1.93 m)	220 lb (100 kg)	1904-08-11	No college
G		Ray Kennedy	5 ft 9 in (1.75 m)	160 lb (73 kg)	1893-10-10	Manhattan
G/F		Howie Meyers	5 ft 8 in (1.73 m)	160 lb (73 kg)	1907-08-03	Technical HS (PA)
G/F		Chickie Passon	5 ft 7 in (1.70 m)	165 lb (75 kg)	1900-05-30	Penn
G		Elmer Ripley	5 ft 7 in (1.70 m)	150 lb (68 kg)	1891-07-21	Brown
G/F		Rusty Saunders	6 ft 2 in (1.88 m)	210 lb (95 kg)	1906-03-12	Central HS (NJ)
G		Lou Schneiderman	5 ft 8 in (1.73 m)	150 lb (68 kg)	1899–01–10	No college

Coaches
Head coach

Ray Kennedy

Legend
- (DP) Unsigned draft pick
- (FA) Free agent
- (S) Suspended
- Injured

=== Brooklyn Visitations Roster ===
Due to information on older professional basketball leagues being generally hard (if not outright impossible these days) to find for players from leagues like the "original" Metropolitan Basketball League and the American Basketball League (the latter league to a lesser extent by comparison to the former league in question), there are bound to be more gaps and/or inaccuracies found in certain areas on the team's roster spots than usual. Not only that, but this roster would be listing out the combined rosters held within both the "original" Metropolitan Basketball League and the American Basketball League during this season only.

1927–28 Brooklyn Visitations roster
Players

Pos.	No.	Player	Height	Weight	DOB	From
C		Cliff Anderson	6 ft 4 in (1.93 m)	180 lb (82 kg)	1903-03-02	CCNY
F/C		Mike Arrasate	6 ft 3 in (1.91 m)	205 lb (93 kg)	1904-07-11	No college
F		Marty Bobbenrieth	5 ft 7 in (1.70 m)	165 lb (75 kg)	1906-12-07	No college
F		Joseph Brennan	6 ft 0 in (1.83 m)	175 lb (79 kg)	1900-11-15	St. Augustine HS (NY)
F		George Clough	5 ft 11 in (1.80 m)	170 lb (77 kg)	1906-07-24	No college
G/F		Red Conaty	5 ft 11 in (1.80 m)	160 lb (73 kg)	1904-02-12	St. Francis College
G/F		Rody Cooney	5 ft 8 in (1.73 m)	140 lb (64 kg)	1902-05-17	No college
F/C		John Frank	6 ft 4 in (1.93 m)		1903-09-17	No college
G/F		Bob Grody	6 ft 2 in (1.88 m)	215 lb (98 kg)	1900-04-25	Hamilton College
C		Mark Harper	6 ft 4 in (1.93 m)	220 lb (100 kg)	1904-08-11	No college
C		Pat Herlihy	6 ft 4 in (1.93 m)	220 lb (100 kg)	1909-02-28	No college
G		Ray Kennedy	5 ft 9 in (1.75 m)	160 lb (73 kg)	1893-10-10	Manhattan
F/C		Willie Lapchick	6 ft 3 in (1.91 m)	170 lb (77 kg)	1905-10-08	No college
G/F		Harry McCrystal	5 ft 8 in (1.73 m)	160 lb (73 kg)	1907-02-23	No college
G/F		Tom Purcell	5 ft 10 in (1.78 m)	165 lb (75 kg)	1902-03-06	Notre Dame
G/F		Frank Roxbury	5 ft 8 in (1.73 m)	165 lb (75 kg)	1906-02-10	No college
G/F		Rusty Saunders	6 ft 2 in (1.88 m)	210 lb (95 kg)	1906-03-12	Central HS (NJ)
G		Willie Scrill	5 ft 10 in (1.78 m)	175 lb (79 kg)	1907-09-01	No college
F		Eddie Stuchbury	5 ft 8 in (1.73 m)	170 lb (77 kg)	1898-12-11	No college
G		Dave Tobey	5 ft 9 in (1.75 m)	145 lb (66 kg)	1898-05-01	Savage School for Physical Education
G/F		Bucky Williams	5 ft 7 in (1.70 m)	155 lb (70 kg)	1904-02-04	No college

Coaches
Head coach

John Donlon

Legend
- (DP) Unsigned draft pick
- (FA) Free agent
- (S) Suspended
- Injured

During the team's time spent within the Metropolitan Basketball League earlier this season, the Visitations would briefly see an unknown forward with the last name of Brooks and an unknown center with the last name of Hillcrest joining the team for a game each as well, with the team's roster during their time within the MBL also including Mike Arrasate, Marty Bobbenrieth, George Clough, Red Conaty, Rody Cooney, John Frank, Bob Grody, Willie Lapchick, Harry McCrystal, Tom Purcell, Frank Roxbury, Willie Scrill, Eddie Stuchbury, and Dave Tobey as well. Not only that, but during the team's time within the American Basketball League, four of the Visitations' players from this season in Red Conaty, Mark Harper, Ray Kennedy, and Rusty Saunders would also play for the original Washington Palace Five team seen above as well while they were in the ABL before the Visitations replaced the Palace Five squad, with the Visitations' ABL roster also including Cliff Anderson, Joseph Brennan, Rody Cooney, Pat Herlihy, Willie Scrill, and Bucky Williams as well.

== American Basketball League Standings ==
=== Eastern Division ===
Eastern Division
Team	Wins	Losses	Winning %
New York (Original) Celtics	40	9	.816
Philadelphia Warriors	30	21	.588
Washington Palace Five (/ Laundrymen) / Brooklyn Visitations*	25	26	.490
Rochester Centrals	24	28	.462

* – The Washington Palace Five / Laundrymen franchise would have their franchise rights and record be transferred out to the Brooklyn Visitations by January 3, 1928 for the unofficial second half of the season.

=== Western Division ===
Western Division
Team	Wins	Losses	Winning %
Fort Wayne Hoosiers	27	24	.529
Cleveland Rosenblums	22	29	.431
Chicago Bruins	13	36	.265
Detroit Cardinals / Olympians†	5	13	.278

† – Withdrew from the ABL on January 3, 1928 by the start of the unofficial second half of the season.
