= Snooks Dowd =

American football and baseball player (1897–1962)

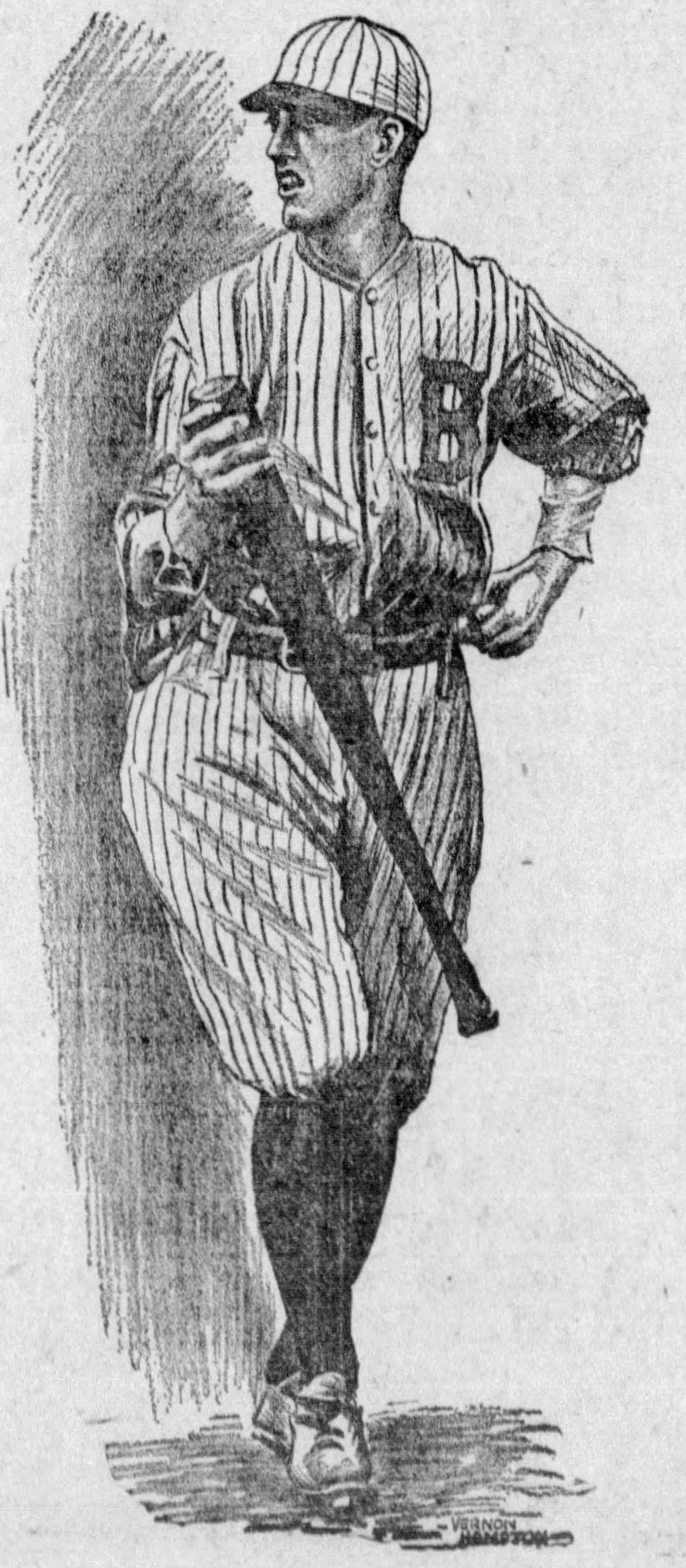
- Infielder
- Born: December 20, 1897; Springfield, Massachusetts, U.S.
- Died: April 4, 1962 (aged 64); Leeds, Massachusetts, U.S.
- Batted: Right Threw: Right

MLB debut
- April 27, 1919, for the Detroit Tigers

Last MLB appearance
- April 17, 1926, for the Brooklyn Robins

MLB statistics
- Batting average: .115
- Home runs: 0
- Runs batted in: 6
- Stats at Baseball Reference

Teams
- Detroit Tigers (1919); Philadelphia Athletics (1919); Brooklyn Robins (1926)

Raymond Bernard "Snooks" Dowd (December 20, 1897 – April 4, 1962) was an American baseball and football player. He played college football for Lehigh University. He also played professional basketball for the short-lived Boston Whirlwinds and Baltimore Orioles teams in the original American Basketball League. However, he would most notably play professional baseball as an infielder from 1918 to 1927, including stints with the Detroit Tigers (1919), Philadelphia Athletics (1919), and Brooklyn Robins (1926).

== Early years ==
Dowd was born in Springfield, Massachusetts, in 1897. He attended Lehigh University where he played football, basketball, and baseball. He was credited with a 200-yard touchdown run after recovering a fumble and running nearly 100 yards in the wrong direction before correcting his course and running 100 yards back in the correct direction. He left the school in January 1919 prior to taking examinations he had been ordered to take by the faculty.

== Professional baseball ==
Dowd began playing professional baseball in 1918 for the Syracuse Stars in the International League. He compiled a .290 batting average and stole 11 bases during the 1918 season. He made his major league debut on April 27, 1919, with the Detroit Tigers, but appeared in only one game with the Tigers. He also appeared in 12 major league games for the Philadelphia Athletics during the 1919 season, but he spent the bulk of the 1919 season with the Newark Bears, compiling a .329 batting average.

Dowd spent the 1920 and 1921 seasons with the Buffalo Bisons of the International League, compiling batting averages of .307 in 1920 and .292 in 1921. He continued to play in the minor leagues for the Kansas City Blues (1922), Albany Senators (1922), Reading Keystones (1923), New Haven Profs (1923-1924), and Jersey City Skeeters (1925-26).

He briefly returned to the major leagues in April 1926, appearing in two games for the Brooklyn Robins. He continued playing in the minor leagues for two years with the Newark Bears (1926), Springfield Ponies (1926), Bridgeport Bears (1927), Hartford Senators (1927), and Providence Grays (1927). He was described as "one of the most traveled men in professional baseball."

During his major league career, Snooks appeared in 16 Major League Baseball games and had a career batting average of .115 with four runs, three hits, and six RBIs.

== Death ==
Dowd died in 1962 at age 64 at the Veteran Hospital in Leeds, Massachusetts.
