= Charles Mitchell Whiteside =

American politician (1854–1924)

Charles Mitchell Whiteside (June 15, 1854 – July 19, 1924) was an American businessman and politician.

Whiteside was born in Camden, Ohio and went to the Camden public schools. In 1880, Whiteside moved to Sturgeon Bay in Door County, Wisconsin. He worked for the Wisconsin Chair Company and was in the milling business. He was involved with the Democratic Party and was the editor of the Door County Post newspaper. In 1891 and 1892, Whiteside served in the Wisconsin Assembly in the 40th Wisconsin Legislature but did not seek re-election. While in the Assembly Whiteside sponsored a bill that merged the community of Sawyer, Wisconsin with the city of Sturgeon Bay. In 1892, Whiteside moved to St. Ignace, Michigan and was involved with the abstract business. Whiteside also served as deputy register of deeds and as deputy county clerk for Mackinac County, Michigan. Whiteside died in St. Ignace, Michigan from a stroke.
