= Lou Sugarman =

American basketball player (1889–1951)

Personal information
- Born: October 10, 1889 New York, New York, U.S.
- Died: June 14, 1951 (aged 61) Philadelphia, Pennsylvania, U.S.
- Listed height: 5 ft 6 in (1.68 m)
- Listed weight: 145 lb (66 kg)

Career information
- College: Syracuse (1907–1908); Notre Dame (1908–1909)
- Playing career: 1909–1929

Career history

Playing
- 1909–1911: Hudson Opals
- 1911–1912: Kingston
- 1912–1913: Gloversville
- 1913–1914: Cohoes
- 1914–1917: Greystock Greys
- 1917: Scranton
- 1917–1918: Carbondale
- 1919: Reading Bears
- 1919–1920: Wilkes-Barre Barons
- 1919–1920: North Philadelphia
- 1919–1920: De Neri
- 1920–1921: Philadelphia
- 1921: Camden
- 1921: Wilkes-Barre Barons
- 1921: Philadelphia
- 1921–1923: Coatesville
- 1922–1923: Elizabeth
- 1922–1923: Cohoes
- 1922–1923: Philadelphia Sphas
- 1923–1924: Trenton Bengals
- 1925–1926: Washington Palace Five
- 1926–1927: Baltimore Orioles
- 1929: Trenton Bengals

Coaching
- 1914–1917: Penn (Freshmen)
- 1917: Scranton
- 1919: Reading Bears
- 1920–1921: Princeton
- 1921: Philadelphia
- 1922–1923: Coatesville
- 1925–1926: Washington Palace Five
- 1926–1927: Baltimore Orioles
- 1929: Trenton Bengals
- 1929: Fort Wayne Hoosiers

Louis L. Sugarman (October 10, 1889 – June 14, 1951) was an American basketball player, coach, and official.

== Playing ==
Sugarman played for the University Settlement Society of New York midget championship teams alongside Barney Sedran, Marty Friedman, Ira Streusand, and Jake Fuller. He was the first Jewish player to receive a basketball scholarship at Syracuse. After one season at Syracuse, he moved to Notre Dame.

Sugarman began his professional career in 1909 with the Hudson Opals of the Hudson River League. During the 1911-12 season, he played for the Kingston team in the HRL. He split the 1912–13 season between the Gloversville and Cohoes teams in the New York State League. He was with Cohoes the following season and led the NYSL in scoring. In 1914, he moved to Philadelphia to attend the Philadelphia Dental College. He continued his playing career as a member of the Greystock Greys. He graduated in 1917.

In 1919, Sugarman joined the Reading Bears as named playing manager and captain. His tenure with the team was short lived and he played for two other Eastern League teams (the North Philadelphia Americans and De Neri) as well as the Passaic Athletic Association and Wilkes-Barre Barons that season. He bounced around a number of teams for the remainder of his professional career, playing for teams in Philadelphia, Camden, New Jersey, Plymouth, Pennsylvania, Wilkes-Barre, Pennsylvania, Coatesville, Pennsylvania, Elizabeth, New Jersey, and Cohoes, New York. He finished his playing career in 1929.

=== Reputation ===
Sugarman was described by Sam Miller in Physical Culture as "the swiftest man in the game" who "no man, big or little, with the possible exception of (Samuel) Melitzer...has been able to cope with". Nat Holman called him "one of the hardest men to contend with" when it came to feinting and "the most successful one-handed tosser the game has ever produced".. The Encyclopedia of Jews in Sports described Sugarman as "highly emotional" and a "loner" who was frequently involved in fights caused by antisemitic remarks.

== Coaching ==
Sugarman coached the Penn freshman basketball team while attending dental school. He was a player–coach for the Scranton Miners, Reading Bears, Philadelphia Phillies, and Coatesville Cotes.

In 1920, Sugarman was hired to coach the Princeton Tigers men's basketball team. Princeton had veteran team and it was hoped they would compete for the Eastern Intercollegiate Basketball League. However, a flat start followed by poor play around Christmas along with the loss of captain Stan Netts made it seem that there was no chance the team would have a chance to win the league. However, the team's fortunes turned around following the return of Armant Legendre. Sugarman unexpectedly resigned on February 17, 1921 and was replaced by the captain of the previous season's team, Jim Hynson. The athletic association cited the need for a coach with an "intimate knowledge of the members of the team" and praised Sugarman for possessing "the widest knowledge of modern basketball and unusual skull as a teacher of the technique of the game". Sugarman, however, stated that the team "needed a babysitter rather than a coach".

In 1925, George Preston Marshall chose Sugarman to be the inaugural coach and general manager of the Washington Palace Five. He was fired midway through the season and replaced by captain Ray Kennedy. The following season, he coached the Baltimore Orioles. After a 1–20 start, the team acquired John Beckman from the Original Celtics and fired Sugarman. On January 28, 1929, he was hired to coach the Trenton Bengals for the remainder of season and led the team to a 6–9 record. He started the following season as head coach of the Fort Wayne Hoosiers, but was fired on December 21, 1929. From 1935 to 1936, he was the head coach at St. Joseph's Preparatory School.

== Officiating ==
After his playing career ended, Sugarman was a college and professional basketball official. He was a referee in the American Basketball League from 1929 to 1931 and 1934 to 1940 and the Metropolitan Basketball League from 1932 to 1934.
