= Charles A. Hughes =

American sportsman

Charles Augustus Hughes (May 18, 1881 – January 29, 1953) was an American sportsman who was the first president of the Detroit Cougars/Falcons (now the Detroit Red Wings) of the National Hockey League and the secretary of the Detroit Athletic Club from its reorganization in 1912 until his death in 1953.

== Early life ==
Hughes was born in Grand Ledge, Michigan, on May 18, 1881, to Quincy A. and Olie E. Hughes. He graduated from the University of Michigan in 1902 and worked as a sportswriter for the Detroit Tribune and the baseball editor for the Chicago Record Herald. On July 31, 1910, he married Anna Corbin in Eaton Rapids, Michigan. They had two daughters.

Hughes was the writer and secretary for William D. Boyce's 1910 African expedition. Upon his return to the United States he returned to Detroit to work in the advertising department of the Hudson Motor Car Company. He left the following year to join J. Walter Thompson's Detroit office.

During World War I, Hughes was a member of the draft board.

== Detroit Athletic Club ==
In 1912, Hughes led the effort to establish an athletic club in Detroit, which resulted in the reorganization of the Detroit Athletic Club. He was elected secretary of the D.A.C., helped lead the effort to construct its new clubhouse, and published the club's magazine. He later persuaded Jean Goldkette to accept the position of music director for the Detroit Athletic Club.

== Hockey ==
In 1926, Hughes was part of a group of investors that were awarded a National Hockey League franchise for Detroit. He was elected president of the organization, which purchased the Victoria Cougars from Frank and Lester Patrick for $100,000. The Cougars would change their name to the Detroit Falcons in 1930 as a result of a promotion with a newspaper. Hughes also served as president of the Detroit Olympics of the International Hockey League.

In April 1932, the Detroit Hockey Club defaulted on an $800,000 bond issued by the Union Guardian Trust Company, and its assets, which included the Falcons, Olympics, and Detroit Olympia, went into receivership. Hughes resigned from the National Hockey League's Board of Governors and was replaced by receiver Arthur B. Pfleiderer.

== Death ==
On January 26, 1953, Hughes suffered a stroke shortly after arriving in Miami Beach, Florida for a vacation. He died three days later at Miami Beach's St. Francis Hospital.
