= Turner's Arena =

Arena in Washington DC, United States

Coordinates: 38°55′9.8″N 77°1′53.5″W

Turner's Arena was the name given to a 1,800 seat arena, located at 1341 W Street, near the northeast corner of 14th and W Streets, NW in Washington, D.C., and originally owned by local wrestling promoter Joe Turner. One of the popular events were bouts featuring local wrestler Swift Eagle and Chief Thunderbird as detailed in the House History Man blog. A photograph and advertisement for the arena appears on page 69 of the book Greater U Street by Paul K. Williams. This venue was an early home to the Capitol Wrestling Corporation, a precursor to WWE, which was started by Vincent J. McMahon in January 1953. McMahon took over the territory from Gabe Menendez, who had succeeded Turner after his death in 1947. In addition, the arena hosted top professional boxing matches promoted by Goldie Ahearn featuring fighters such as Lou Gevinson, Lew Hanbury, and Jimmy Cooper. It was also the birthplace of the Central Intercollegiate Athletic Association annual basketball tournament, as well as the host to top country music acts and Jazz performances. It was renamed Capitol Arena in 1956 once Capitol Wrestling Corporation began broadcasting a syndicated weekly wrestling show from the arena every Thursday night. The arena was closed and demolished in 1965.
