= Detroit Cardinals =

The Detroit Cardinals (also known as the Olympians) were an American basketball team based in Detroit, Michigan that was a member of the American Basketball League.

The team dropped out of the 1927–28 season on January 2, 1928, after their contract with Olympia Stadium was canceled due to poor attendance.

== Year-by-year ==
Year	League	Reg. season	Playoffs
1927/28	ABL	4th, Western	N/A
