= Camden, Ohio =

- Village
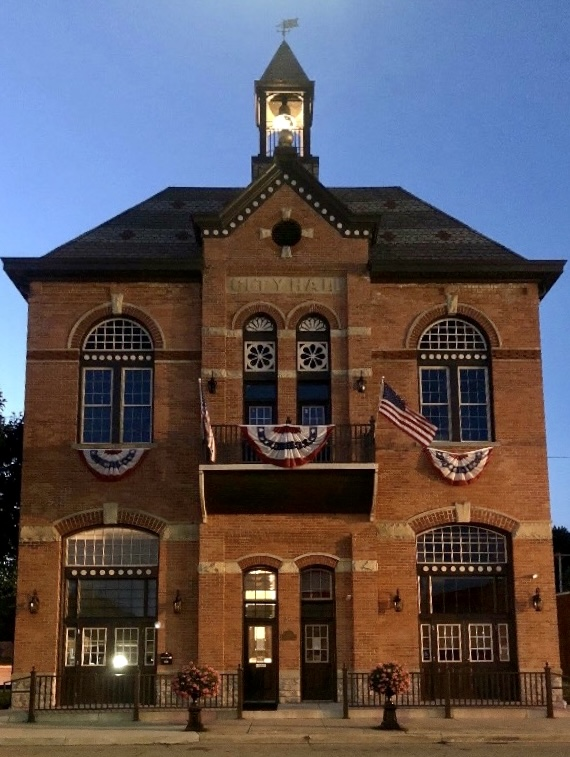
- Camden Town Hall

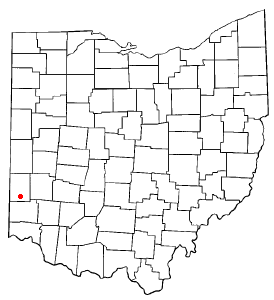
- Location of Camden, Ohio

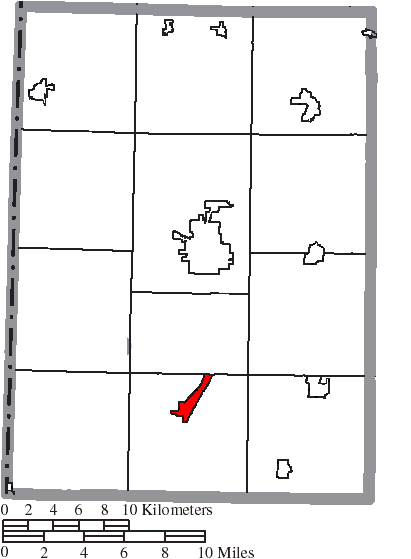
- Location of Camden in Preble County
- Coordinates: 39°37′51″N 84°38′56″W
- Country: United States
- State: Ohio
- County: Preble

Government
  - Type: Mayor/Council/Administrator
  - Mayor: Dan Michael

Area
  - Total: 1.25 sq mi (3.23 km^{2})
  - Land: 1.24 sq mi (3.21 km^{2})
  - Water: 0.0077 sq mi (0.02 km^{2})
- Elevation: 856 ft (261 m)

Population (2020)
  - Total: 1,989
  - Estimate (2023): 1,975
  - Density: 1,602/sq mi (618.7/km^{2})
- Time zone: UTC-5 (Eastern (EST))
  - Summer (DST): UTC-4 (EDT)
- ZIP code: 45311
- Area codes: 937, 326
- FIPS code: 39-11024
- GNIS feature ID: 2397539
- Website: https://camdenohio.org/

Camden is a village in Preble County, Ohio, United States. The population was 1,989 at the 2020 census.

== History ==
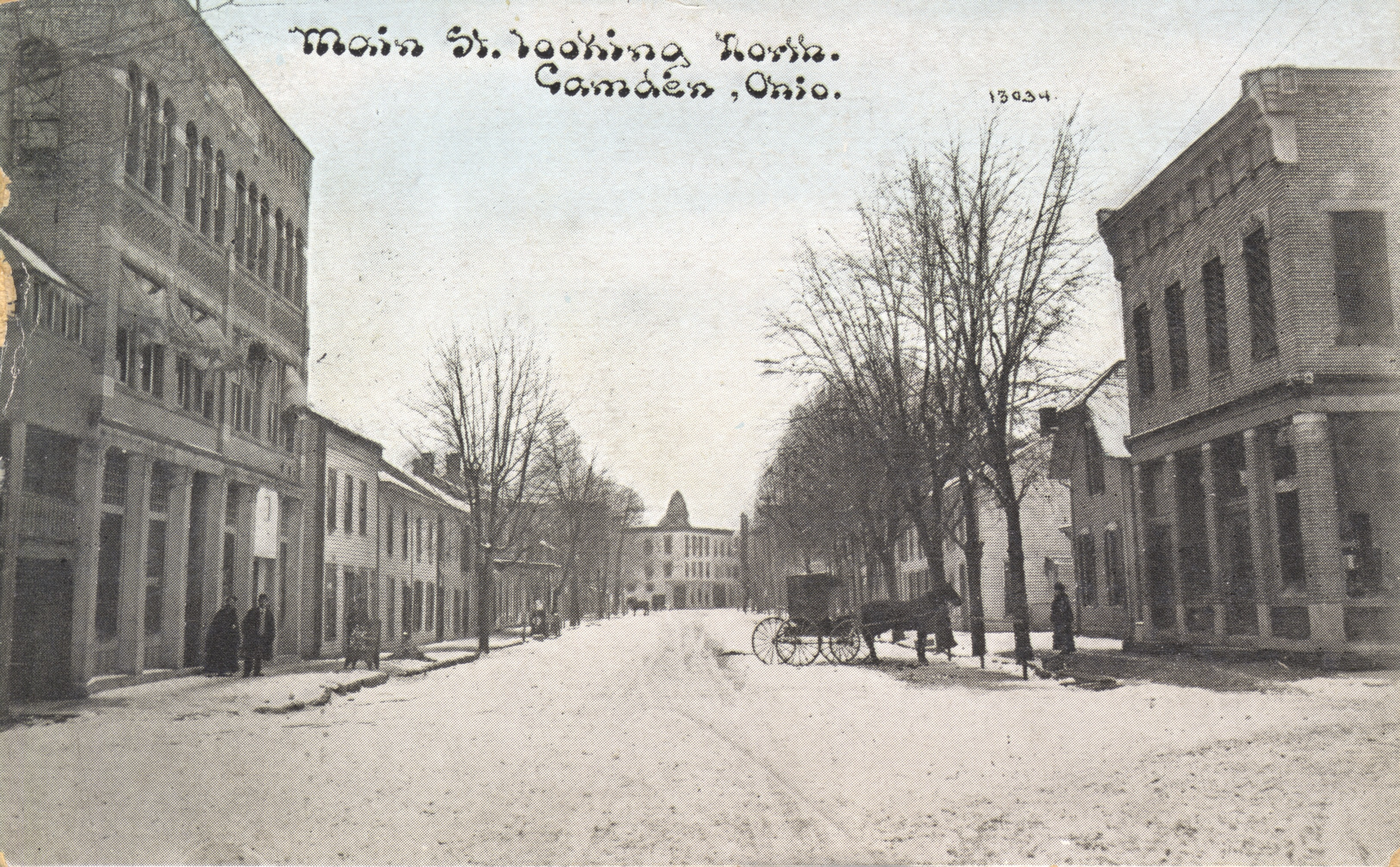
Main Street looking north

Camden was laid out in 1818 as Dover. In 1824, the name was changed to Newcomb after State Senator George Newcomb as Dover, Ohio had already been established. This name did not catch on, and in 1835 the village was renamed to Camden after Camden, South Carolina.

== Geography ==
According to the United States Census Bureau, the village has a total area of 1.25 square miles (3.24 km^{2}), of which 1.24 square miles (3.21 km^{2}) is land and 0.01 square miles (0.03 km^{2}) is water.

== Demographics ==
Historical population
Census	Pop.	Note	%±
1860	637		—
1870	648		1.7%
1880	800		23.5%
1890	846		5.8%
1900	905		7.0%
1910	899		−0.7%
1920	904		0.6%
1930	888		−1.8%
1940	991		11.6%
1950	1,084		9.4%
1960	1,308		20.7%
1970	1,507		15.2%
1980	1,971		30.8%
1990	2,210		12.1%
2000	2,302		4.2%
2010	2,046		−11.1%
2020	1,989		−2.8%
2023 (est.)	1,975	▼	−0.7%
U.S. Decennial Census

=== 2010 census ===
As of the census of 2010, there were 2,046 people, 835 households, and 546 families living in the village. The population density was 1,650.0 inhabitants per square mile (637.1/km^{2}). There were 926 housing units at an average density of 746.8 per square mile (288.3/km^{2}). The racial makeup of the village was 98.8% White, 0.1% African American, 0.2% Native American, 0.2% from other races, and 0.6% from two or more races. Hispanic or Latino of any race were 1.1% of the population.

There were 835 households, of which 36.0% had children under the age of 18 living with them, 42.2% were married couples living together, 17.0% had a female householder with no husband present, 6.2% had a male householder with no wife present, and 34.6% were non-families. 29.7% of all households were made up of individuals, and 14% had someone living alone who was 65 years of age or older. The average household size was 2.45 and the average family size was 2.99.

The median age in the village was 35.2 years. 28% of residents were under the age of 18; 8.3% were between the ages of 18 and 24; 25.5% were from 25 to 44; 25.1% were from 45 to 64; and 13.1% were 65 years of age or older. The gender makeup of the village was 47.3% male and 52.7% female.

=== 2000 census ===
As of the census of 2000, there were 2,302 people, 897 households, and 621 families living in the village. The population density was 1,870.1 inhabitants per square mile (722.0/km^{2}). There were 946 housing units at an average density of 768.5 per square mile (296.7/km^{2}). The racial makeup of the village was 98.57% White, 0.39% African American, 0.39% Native American, 0.17% Asian, 0.04% Pacific Islander, 0.04% from other races, and 0.39% from two or more races. Hispanic or Latino of any race were 0.48% of the population.

There were 897 households, out of which 37.5% had children under the age of 18 living with them, 52.6% were married couples living together, 11.5% had a female householder with no husband present, and 30.7% were non-families. 26.4% of all households were made up of individuals, and 12.7% had someone living alone who was 65 years of age or older. The average household size was 2.57 and the average family size was 3.10.

In the village, the population was spread out, with 29.3% under the age of 18, 9.0% from 18 to 24, 29.8% from 25 to 44, 19.9% from 45 to 64, and 11.9% who were 65 years of age or older. The median age was 33 years. For every 100 females there were 89.6 males. For every 100 females age 18 and over, there were 85.6 males.

The median income for a household in the village was $30,085, and the median income for a family was $32,970. Males had a median income of $23,610 versus $22,640 for females. The per capita income for the village was $14,551. About 6.7% of families and 9.1% of the population were below the poverty line, including 7.5% of those under the age of 18 and 9.7% of those 65 and older.

== Education ==
Camden is part of the Preble Shawnee School District. Students attend Camden Elementary (Grades K-3), West Elkton Elementary (4-6), and Preble Shawnee High School (7-12). The district's mascot is the Arrows.

Camden has a public library, a branch of the Preble County District Library.

== Notable people ==
- Sherwood Anderson, novelist
- Travis Gregg, racing driver
- Myron Scott, creator of the All-American Soap Box Derby
- Charles Mitchell Whiteside, politician and businessman
