= Buffalo Bisons (ABL) =

American basketball team based in Buffalo, New York

The Buffalo Bisons (also known as the Germans) were an American basketball team based in Buffalo, New York that was a member of the American Basketball League in its inaugural 1925–26 season. The Bisons are slated to have confirmed existence as either a continuation or a second generation version of the Naismith Basketball Hall of Fame worthy Buffalo Germans team that had once won the 1904 Summer Olympics event for basketball and won 111 straight games from 1908 to 1910, especially due to former player Alfred Heerdt being involved with this version of the team as the general manager (and later, the owner of the team). Supposedly, despite this team leaving the ABL after its inaugural season there, this version of the Buffalo Bisons would end up debuting for both the Midwest Basketball Conference and the National Basketball League, with the former of which hosted one of the first African American players in an integrated league named Hank Williams and the latter of which would eventually merge operations with the rivaling Basketball Association of America to become the present day National Basketball Association, Despite their history being mixed up due to very little of it being recorded following their brief stint in the ABL (and (supposedly) the MBC and NBL alongside the minor New York State Basketball League alongside supposedly playing under team names like the Buffalo Lincolns and the Buffalo Drydocks to go alongside their coinciding Buffalo Bisons / Germans name), this franchise would ultimately not be related to the team that briefly was named that in 1946 before becoming the present day Atlanta Hawks in the NBA.

== Year-by-year ==
Year	League	Reg. season	Playoffs
1925/26	ABL	9th (1st half); 6th (2nd half)	Did not qualify
