= Boston Whirlwinds =

American basketball team based in Boston, Massachusetts

The Boston Whirlwinds were an American basketball team based in Boston, Massachusetts, that was a member of the American Basketball League.

The team started its only season playing in the Boston Arena, then downgraded their venue first to Mechanics Hall and then to the Mount Benedict Knights of Columbus Hall in suburban Somerville. The team, consisting of players who were younger and less experienced than most other ABL teams, did not do well, compiling a 6–10 record during their short run under player-coach James S. "Fiddle" Morley, who had played for Boston College. The general manager was Sam Snyder.

The team, beset by money troubles, did not complete its only season, folding or being expelled (or both) after the first half of the season concluded by February 11, 1926, with the franchise being given to a team in Canton, Ohio.

== Year-by-year ==
Year	League	Reg. season	Playoffs
1925/26	ABL	6th (1st half)	N/A

== Later incarnation ==
Another, non-league team called the Boston Whirlwinds was extant in the early 1950s. These Whirlwinds, who featured Norm Baker, traveled with, and acted as a foil for, the Harlem Globetrotters.
