= Rusty Saunders =

American baseball player (1906-1967)

- Outfielder
- Born: March 12, 1906; Trenton, New Jersey, U.S.
- Died: November 24, 1967 (aged 61); Trenton, New Jersey, U.S.
- Batted: Right Threw: Right

MLB debut
- September 24, 1927, for the Philadelphia Athletics

Last MLB appearance
- October 2, 1927, for the Philadelphia Athletics

MLB statistics
- Batting average: .133
- Hits: 2
- Runs batted in: 2
- Stats at Baseball Reference

Teams
- Philadelphia Athletics (1927)

Russell Collier Saunders (March 12, 1906 – November 24, 1967) was an American Major League Baseball outfielder who played in 1927 with the Philadelphia Athletics. He was born and died in Trenton, New Jersey. He batted and threw right-handed. Saunders began his professional baseball career with the Chambersburg Maroons of the Blue Ridge League in 1927. He had a .983 fielding percentage playing in 95 games as part of the Chambersburg team that won the Blue Ridge Championship that year. After the Blue Ridge League season ended, Saunders was called up to the baseball major leagues. Saunders had a .133 batting average in five games, two hits in 15 at-bats, in his brief time in the majors. He continued to play minor league baseball through the 1931 season.

Saunders, at 6 ft 2 in (1.88 m) and 205 pounds (93 kg), also played professional basketball. He played in a number of professional leagues, including the American Basketball League and National Basketball League, among others.
