= Detroit Pulaski =

American basketball team based in Detroit, Michigan

The Detroit Pulaski Post Five were an American basketball team based in Detroit, Michigan that was a member of the American Basketball League.

The team became known as the Detroit Lions after the beginning of the 1926/27 season and dropped out of the league after 6 games in that season.

== Year-by-year ==
Year	League	Reg. season	Playoffs
1925/26	ABL	8th (1st half); 8th (2nd half)	Did not qualify
1926/27	ABL	9th (1st half); Folded (2nd half)	N/A
