= George Preston Marshall =

American sports team owner (1896–1969)

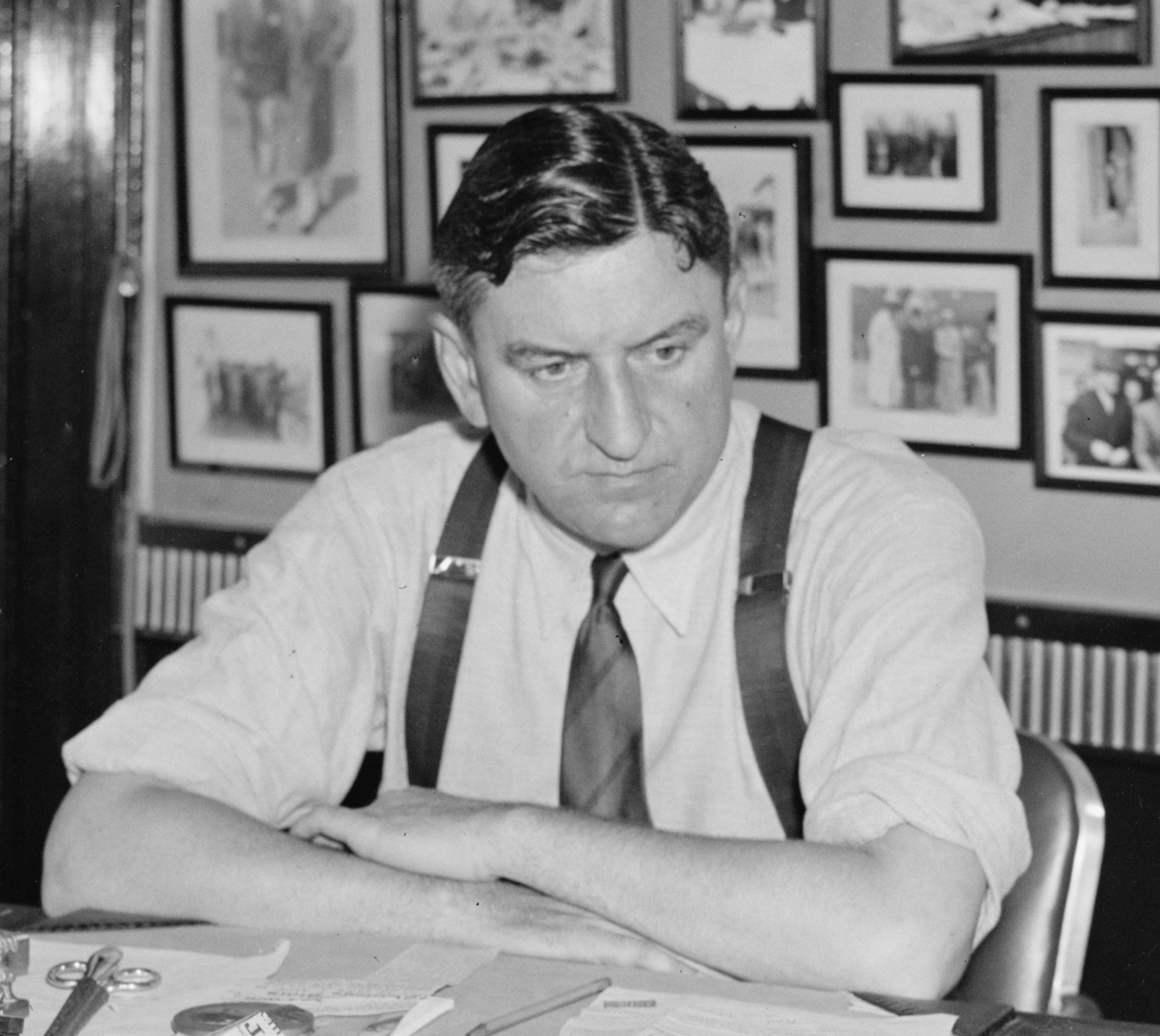
- Marshall in 1937

Personal information
- Born: October 11, 1896; Grafton, West Virginia, U.S.
- Died: August 9, 1969 (aged 72); Washington, D.C., U.S.

Career information
- College: Randolph-Macon College

Career history
- Boston / Washington Redskins (1932–1969); Owner

Awards and highlights
- 2× NFL champion (1937, 1942)
- Pro Football Hall of Fame

George Preston Marshall (October 11, 1896 – August 9, 1969) was an American professional football executive who founded the National Football League (NFL)'s Washington Redskins. The team began play as the Boston Braves in 1932; he renamed them the Redskins the following year and relocated the team to Washington, D.C. in 1937. Marshall was inducted into the Pro Football Hall of Fame with its inaugural class of 1963. He was a supporter of racial segregation and was the last NFL owner to integrate African Americans onto a roster, only doing so in 1962 amid pressure from the federal government who threatened to block the use of D.C. Stadium. Marshall owned the team and was its president until his death from health issues in 1969.

== Early life and college ==
Marshall was born in Grafton, West Virginia, where his parents, Thomas Hildebrand ("Hill") Marshall and Blanche Preston Marshall, owned the local newspaper. When he was a teenager, his family moved to Washington D.C., after his father bought a laundry business there. He briefly attended Randolph–Macon College in Ashland, Virginia, before dropping out at age 18.

== Career ==
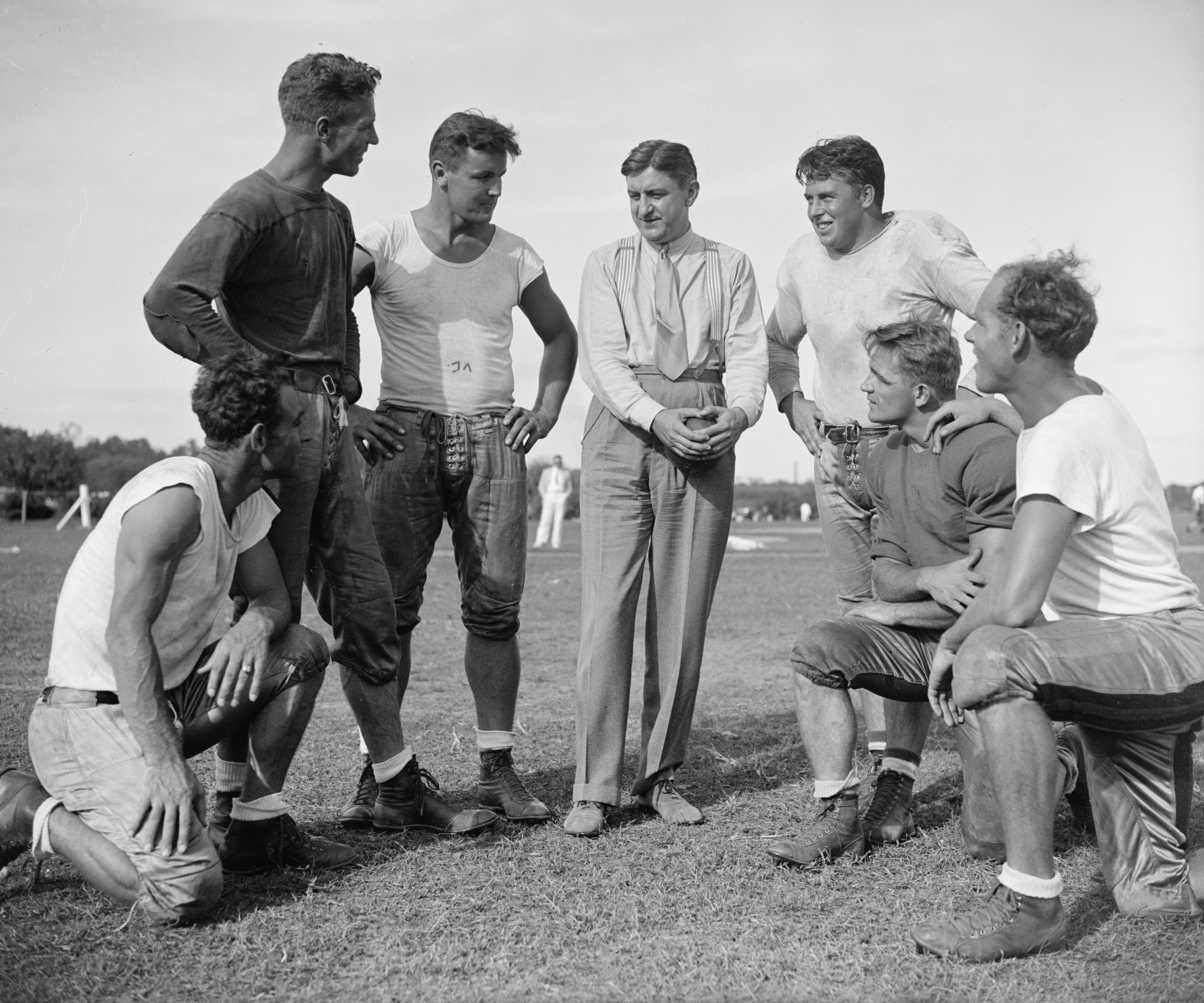
Marshall talking with Washington Redskins players, 1937

Marshall initially pursued acting, and was an extra for a local theater but this pursuit was interrupted in 1918 when he was drafted into World War I, although he was not deployed abroad. He was discharged from the U.S. Army the same year, in December 1918. Following his father's death in 1919, he took over the two-store laundry business. In 1926, he financed the Washington Palace Five basketball team. The team folded in 1928.

In 1932, he and three other partners were awarded an NFL franchise for Boston. The team was known as the Boston Braves, as it played on the same field as baseball's Boston Braves. After the team incurred a $46,000 loss in its first season, Marshall's partners sold their interests to him.

In 1933, he moved the team from Braves Field to Fenway Park, which the team shared with the Boston Red Sox. He hired coach "Lone Star" William Henry Dietz, who claimed to be part Sioux and changed the team name from the Braves to the Redskins. Marshall said that he chose the name so that the team could keep its Native American logos.

In 1936, the team won the Eastern division and hosted the 1936 NFL Championship Game, which Marshall moved from Boston to the Polo Grounds in New York City. After a lack of support by fans despite winning the division title, he moved the team to Washington, D.C. for the 1937 season.

At the time, college football was more popular than the NFL. Marshall saw the NFL as not just a sport but as a form of entertainment and incorporated elements of college football, including gala halftime shows, a marching band, and a fight song, "Hail to the Redskins". To increase scoring, Marshall and George Halas, owner of the Chicago Bears, successfully suggested allowing a forward pass to be thrown from anywhere behind the line of scrimmage, rather than at a minimum of five yards behind the line. He also suggested moving the goal posts from the end line to the goal line, where they were in Canadian football, to encourage the kicking of field goals. This change remained in place for about four decades until NFL goal posts were returned to the end line in the mid-1970s as part of an effort to lessen the influence on the game of kicking specialists.

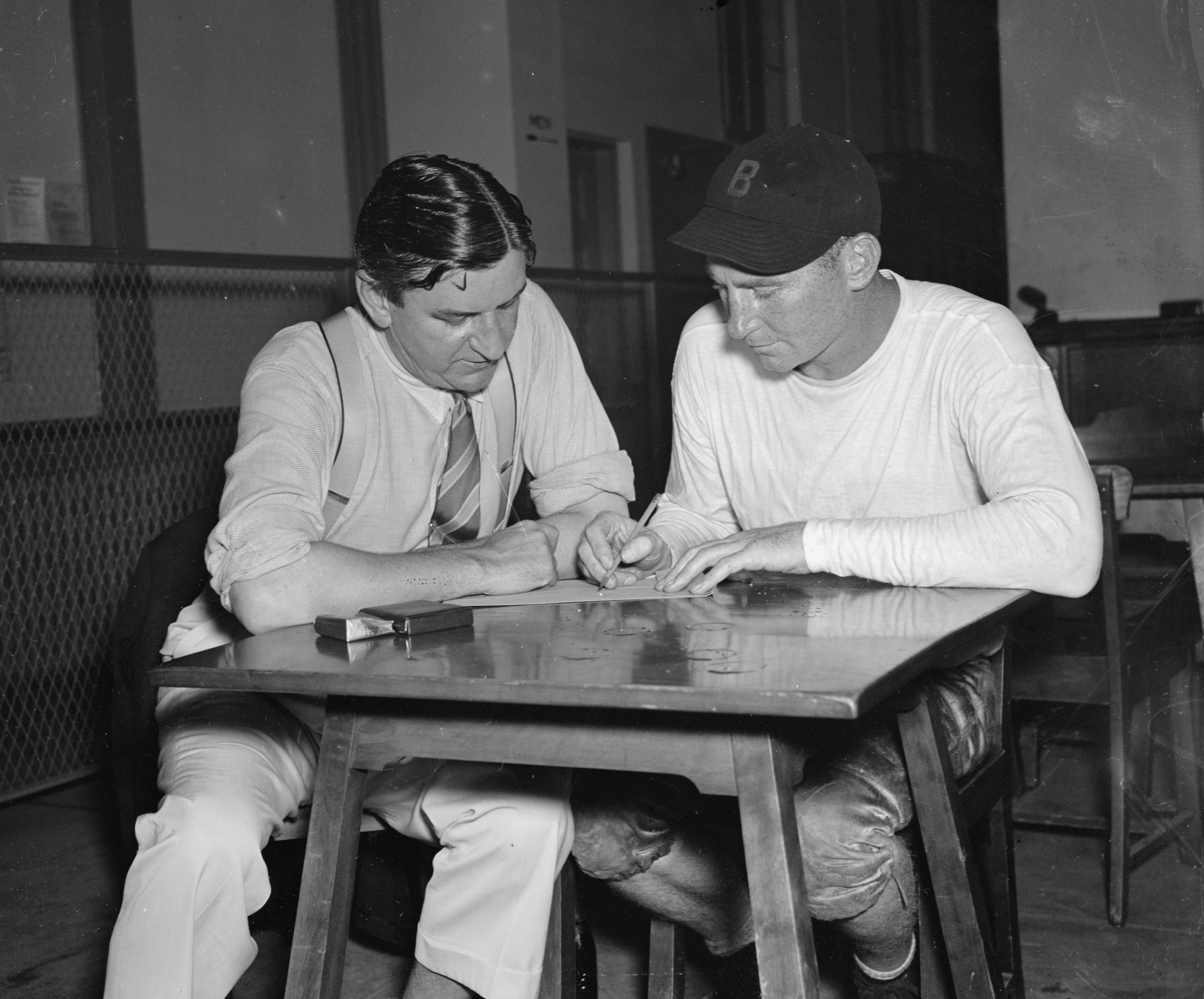
Marshall with Redskins head coach Ray Flaherty, 1937

Marshall also pushed to standardize the schedule so that each team played the same number of games, the teams were split into divisions with the winners meeting in a championship game, and game gate receipts were split between the home team and the visitor using by either a 60–40 split or a guaranteed amount of money, whichever was larger. During the 1937 season, Marshall rented a train and brought 10,000 fans to New York City to watch the team play the New York Giants. In 1946, he sold the laundromat business, which by then had grown to 57 locations. In the 1950s, Marshall was the first NFL owner to embrace television. He initiated the first network appearances for any NFL team and built a television network to broadcast Redskins games across the Southern United States.

In 1960, Marshall opposed the addition of the Dallas Cowboys to the NFL, ending his team's stature as the only team south of the Mason–Dixon line. He only agreed to the addition after a rival acquired the rights to the fight song from the writer of the music and threatened to prohibit the team from playing it at games. In November 1960, Marshall sold 25% of the team to Jack Kent Cooke for $350,000. Marshall was extremely frugal and did not let the team spend money on travel expenses and salaries. He once berated Pittsburgh Steelers owner Art Rooney for driving up salaries by signing then University of Colorado's Byron White for $15,800, then the highest contract in football in the late 1930s. One sportswriter referred to Marshall as "the last of the small-time spenders."

=== Racial views ===
As a result of a gentleman's agreement promoted by Marshall, NFL teams did not sign black players until two teams broke the agreement in 1946. Marshall refused to do so, claiming that integrating the team would cause the team to lose fans in the Southern U.S. as his team was, at the time, the southernmost team in the NFL. He said that "We'll start signing Negroes when the Harlem Globetrotters start signing whites."

His refusal to integrate was routinely mocked by Shirley Povich, a columnist for The Washington Post, who called him "one of pro football's greatest innovators, and its leading bigot." Marshall unsuccessfully sued Povich for $200,000 after a critical article.

Marshall downplayed the issue of integration, saying "I am surprised that with the world on the brink of another war they are worried about whether or not a Negro is going to play for the Redskins" and doubted that "the government had the right to tell the showman how to cast the play." Marshall had a long-running feud with Redskins shareholder Harry Wismer, who favored integration.

In 1961, United States Secretary of the Interior Stewart Udall and Attorney General of the United States Robert F. Kennedy issued an ultimatum: unless Marshall signed a black player, the government would revoke the Redskins' 30-year lease on D.C. Stadium (later known as RFK Memorial Stadium). Udall and Kennedy were well within their rights to take this action, since D. C. Stadium had been funded by government money and was located on federal land. As well, the Constitution vests Congress, and ipso facto the federal government, with ultimate authority over the capital.

Marshall selected Ernie Davis, Syracuse University's All-American running back, as his top draft choice in the 1962 NFL draft. However, Davis refused to play for the team and was traded to the Cleveland Browns for All-Pro Bobby Mitchell, who became the first black player to play for the Redskins. Marshall became an enthusiastic supporter of Mitchell. The Redskins only had three winning seasons in the 23 years between the 1946 integration of the NFL and Marshall's death in 1969. On a television show, Oscar Levant asked Marshall if he was antisemitic, to which he responded: "Oh no, I love Jews, especially when they're customers".

== Personal life ==
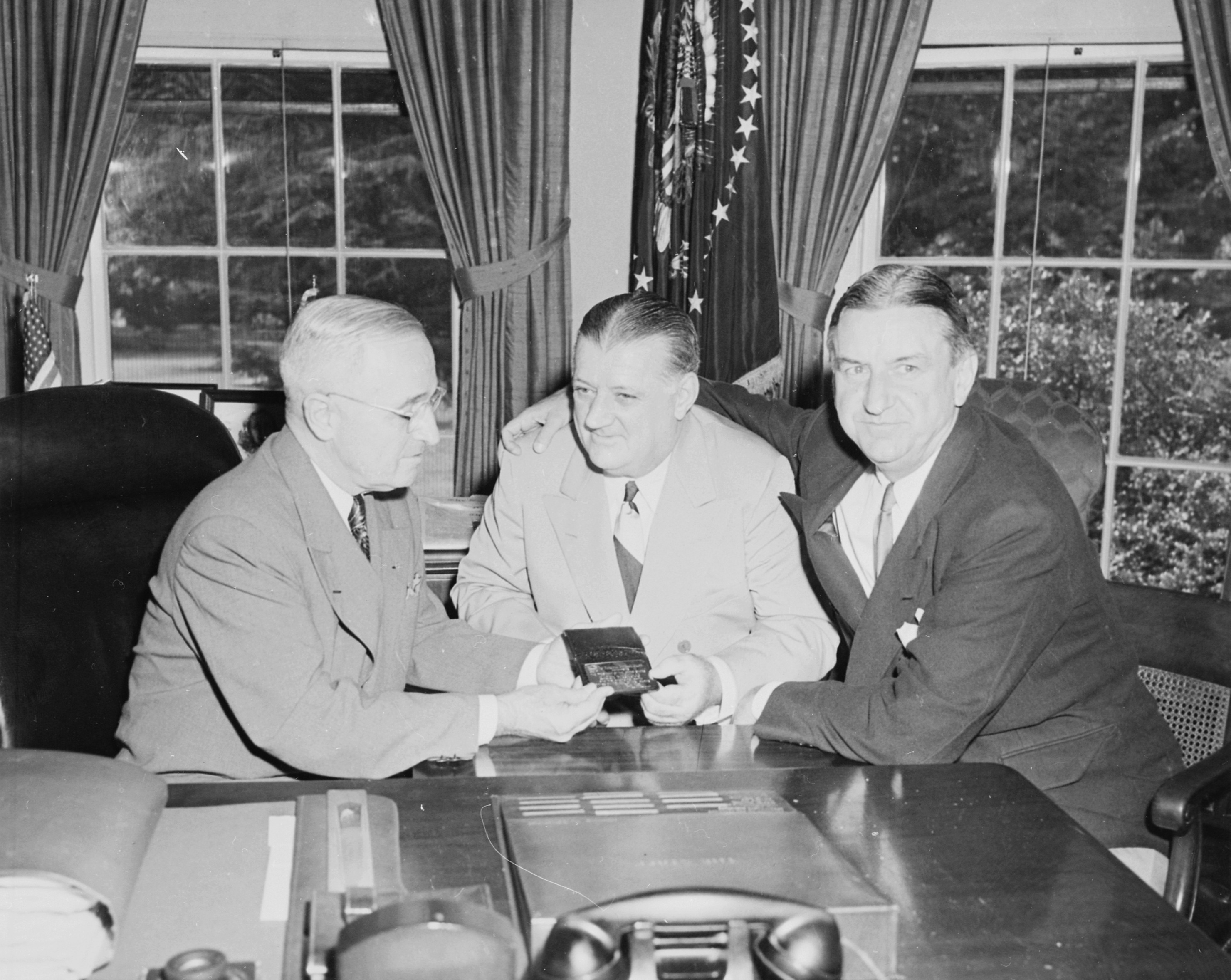
NFL commissioner Bert Bell and Marshall presenting Redskins tickets to U.S. president Harry Truman, 1949

His obituary in The Washington Post stated: "Marshall considered it a lost opportunity were he not the center of attention". He had a fear of flying and never learned to drive.

In 1920, Marshall married Elizabeth Morton, a former Ziegfeld Follies girl. They had two children, separated in 1928 and divorced in 1935. His mistress in the 1920s and 1930s was silent screen actress and Ziegfeld Follies dancer Louise Brooks. She gave him the nickname "Wet Wash" because he owned a laundry chain. He was married to film actress-author Corinne Griffith from 1936 to 1957. She referred to him in print as "The Marshall without a plan."

The George Preston Marshall Foundation serves the interests of children in the Washington metropolitan area. Marshall added a caveat that no money from the foundation would ever go toward "any purpose which supports the principle of racial integration in any form"; however, this requirement was thrown out by the courts.

== Death ==
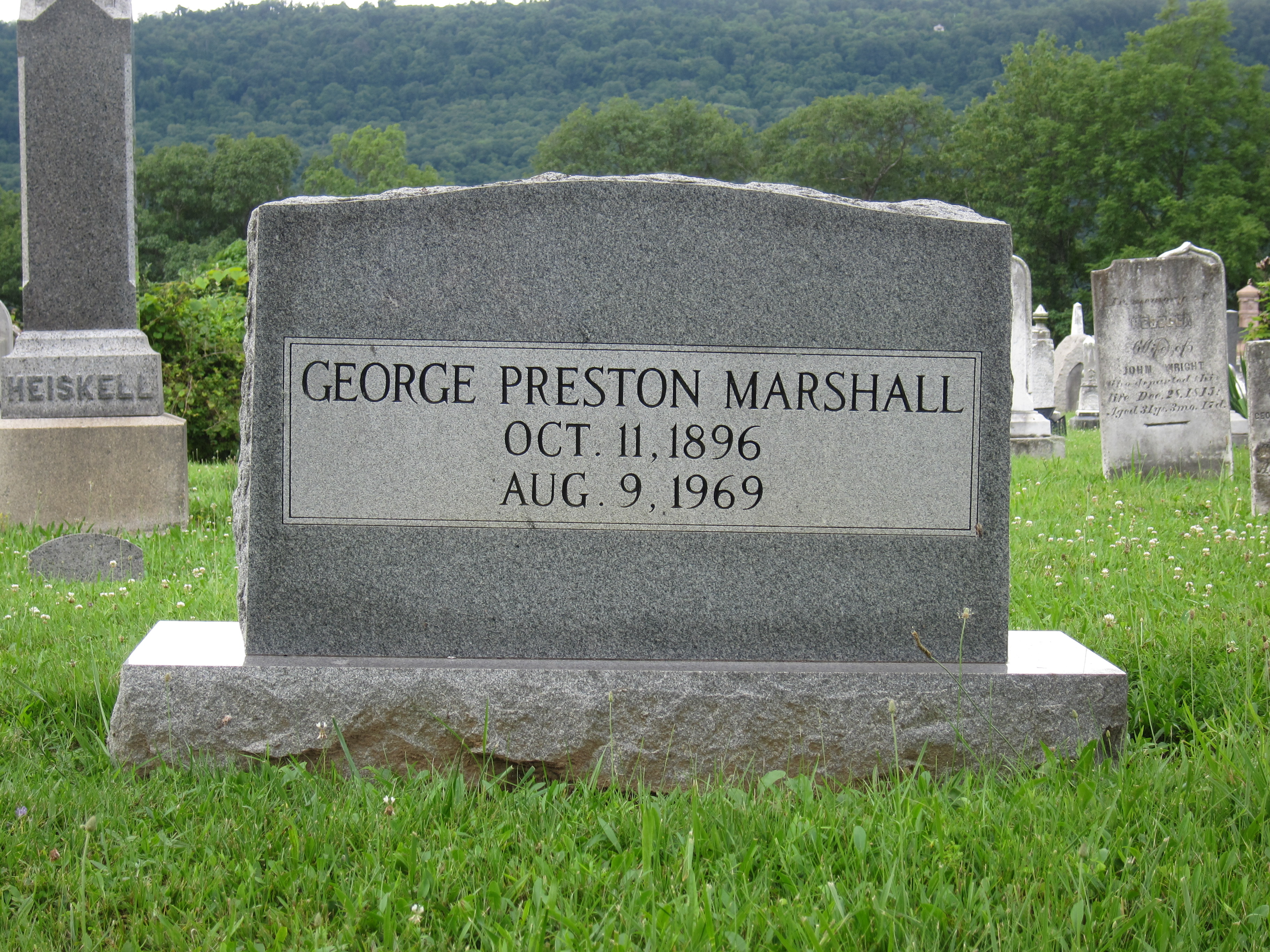
Marshall's grave at Indian Mound Cemetery in Romney, West Virginia

In August 1962, he underwent surgery to correct a hernia. Later, he suffered a cerebral thrombosis.

In 1963, soon after his induction to the Pro Football Hall of Fame, Marshall suffered a debilitating stroke that left him legally incompetent to manage his affairs. Three conservators were assigned to manage the football team: C. Leo DeOrsey, who owned 13% of the team and Edward Bennett Williams and Milton W. King, who each owned 5% of the team. Marshall appointed board member Williams to run the team's daily operations in 1965.

In August 1969, Marshall died in his sleep at his home in Georgetown from hemiparesis and a heart condition, compounded by diabetes and arteriosclerosis. His funeral was held at the Washington National Cathedral. Marshall is buried at the family plot in Indian Mound Cemetery in Romney, West Virginia.
