= Washington Palace Five =

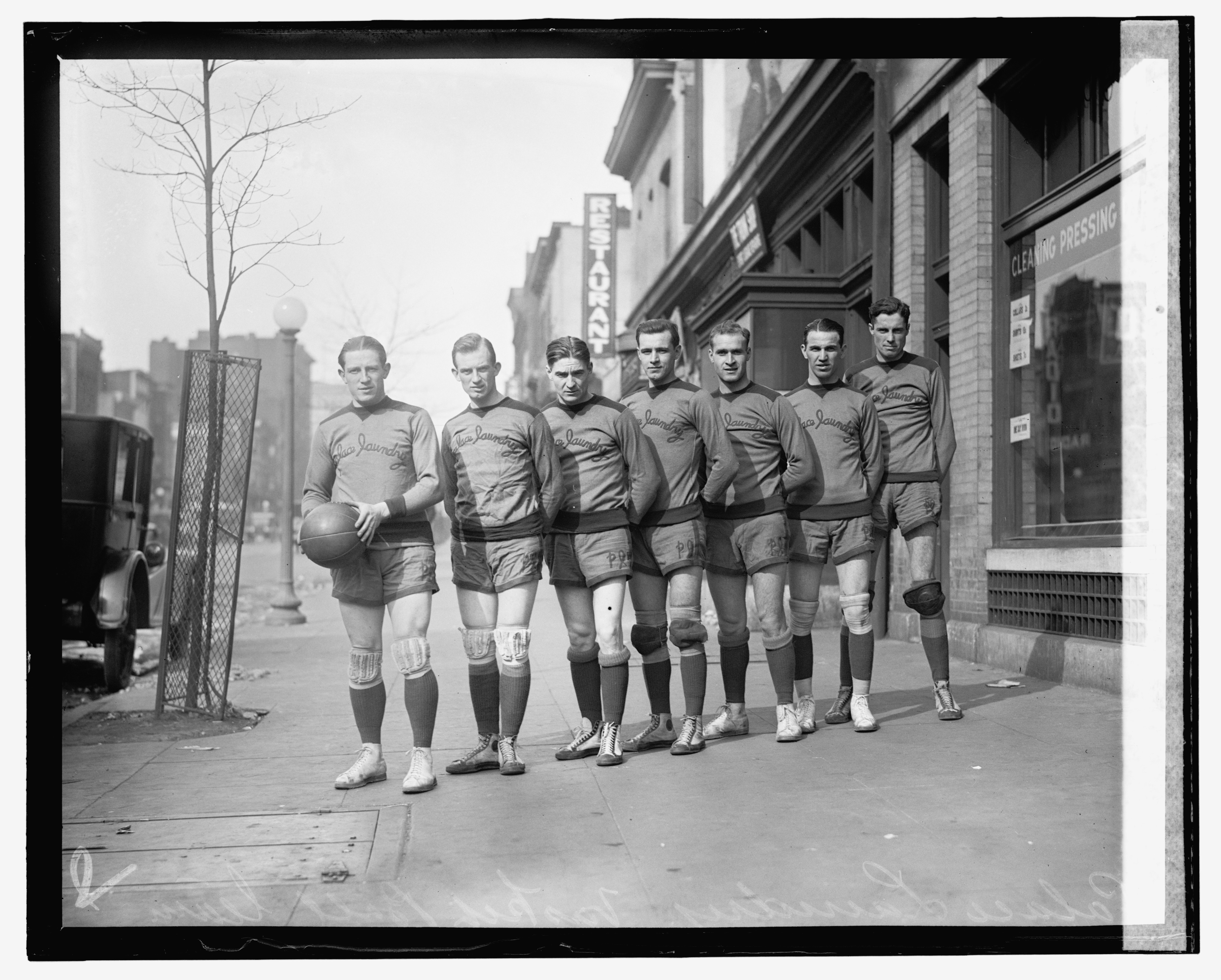
1924 team

The Washington Palace Five, also known as the Laundrymen, were an American basketball team based in Washington, D.C. that was a member of the American Basketball League. The team was owned by George Preston Marshall, who later brought the Washington Commanders football team to Washington, D.C. The team was sponsored by Palace Laundry, a chain of laundries, which inspired the team's nickname.

The team played at the Arcade, a large amusement center located at the corner of 14th and Irving Streets NW, where the DC USA shopping center is currently located. Along with the basketball team, the facility hosted a 4,000-seat arena, skating, movie screens, bowling, and more.

During the 1927–28 season, they dropped out of the league on January 2, 1928, and were replaced by the Brooklyn Visitations.

== Year-by-year ==
Year	League	Reg. season	Playoffs
1925/26	ABL	3rd (1st half); 2nd (2nd half)	Did not qualify
1926/27	ABL	2nd (1st half); 3rd (2nd half)	Did not qualify
1927/28	ABL	N/A	N/A
