= 1926–27 Cleveland Rosenblums season =

- League: American Basketball League (original)
- Head coach: Marty Friedman (player-coach)
- General manager: Max Rosenblum
- Owner(s): Max Rosenblum
- Arena: Public Hall Auditorium

Results
- Record: 26–16 (.619)
- Place: Conference: 1st (1st half); 5th (2nd half)
- Playoff finish: Lost ABL championship series 3–0 to the "Original" Brooklyn Celtics

The 1926–27 Cleveland Rosenblums season was both the Rosenblums' second season of existence as a professional franchise (after previously playing by as early as 1919 in an independent basis under the Rosenblum Credits name and sometimes having their team name being shortened down to the Rosies) and the second season of existence for the American Basketball League, which was the first professional basketball league that had truly attempted to go fully national after previous professional basketball leagues were mostly regional at the time. For the second straight season in a row, the American Basketball League would start out their season with nine teams competing in the split season formatting, with the two half seasons being utilized instead of one whole season being utilized throughout the entire season (which would be the case throughout the majority of the league's existence in the first place). However, unlike the previous season of play, not only would the original Brooklyn Arcadians team (sometimes referred to as the Brooklyn Rockets) end up being replaced by the Original Celtics under the temporary distinction of the Brooklyn Celtics for this season only, but the Detroit Pulaski Post Five / Lions would end up folding operations after six straight losses to their season (and by extension, get their record officially stricken from the record books entirely), with the Philadelphia Quakers / Phillies team also later being replaced by the Philadelphia Sphas under the Philadelphia Warriors name that would inspire the future Golden State Warriors NBA team by the time the second half of the season began. Despite the early uncertainties involved at the time, Cleveland would still end up becoming one of the best teams around within this updated league throughout the entire season (partially because Max Rosenblum would be able to keep his star players away from the rivaling "original" National Basketball League, which was a failed attempt by the rivaling Metropolitan Basketball League to steal away clout from the ABL during this season, though it would ironically also feature the Original Celtics as a team there at the time). During the first half of the season, the Rosenblums would end up finishing one game ahead of the Washington Palace Five team (who had to replenish themselves on the spot due to the aforementioned coup from the "original" National Basketball League) for a first-place finish in the first half of the season with a 17–4 record (though if the Original Celtics (playing under the Brooklyn Celtics name this time around due to them taking over the Brooklyn Arcadians early on in the season) had entered the first half of the season under their own accord, they would have ended up stealing first place from the Rosenblums instead had their own 13–3 record in the first half of the season counted under their own accord instead of being modified to include the five straight losses the original Arcadians franchise had early on in the season). However, before they ended the second half of the season, the Rosenblums would end up losing star guard Honey Russell to the Chicago Bruins due to a disagreement with team owner (and general manager) Max Rosenblum, which led to Cleveland finishing the second half of the season with a below–average 9–12 record for a brutal fifth-place finish that had them ahead of only the aforementioned Chicago Bruins, the Rochester Centrals, and the Baltimore Orioles basketball team this time around. Despite them having a poor second half finish to the season, the split season format would allow for the Rosenblums to try and bounce back from that particular half-season of play for a chance to repeat as champions of the ABL due to their previous first half of the season placement, though the Rosenblums would have to go up against the Original Celtics (under their temporary Brooklyn Celtics name) this time around instead if they were to do so since the Celtics won the second half of the season in a very convincing manner themselves with a 19–2 record there. Unfortunately for the Rosenblums, the opposite of the first ABL championship series would occur for them, as they would end up being swept 3–0 by the Brooklyn Celtics (who were really the Naismith Basketball Hall of Fame worthy Original Celtics franchise), which led to Cleveland failing to repeat as ABL champions this season.

== Roster ==
Due to information on American Basketball League players being generally hard to find, there are bound to be more gaps and/or inaccuracies found in certain areas on the team's roster spots than usual.

1926–27 Cleveland Rosenblums roster
Players

Pos.	No.	Player	Height	Weight	DOB	From
F/C		Cookie Cunningham	6 ft 3 in (1.91 m)	210 lb (95 kg)	1905-02-04	Ohio State
C		Rich Deighan	6 ft 3 in (1.91 m)	200 lb (91 kg)	1900-02-03	No college
C		Gil Ely	6 ft 2 in (1.88 m)	175 lb (79 kg)	1898-09-27	Michigan
G/F		Marty Friedman	5 ft 8 in (1.73 m)	135 lb (61 kg)	1889-07-12	NYU
G/F		Nat Hickey	5 ft 11 in (1.80 m)	190 lb (86 kg)	1902-01-30	Hoboken HS (NJ)
G/F		Carl Husta	5 ft 11 in (1.80 m)	175 lb (79 kg)	1902-04-08	No college
G/F		Dave Kerr	6 ft 2 in (1.88 m)	195 lb (88 kg)	1896-02-03	Central HS (PA)
G/F		Moon Klinzing	5 ft 10 in (1.78 m)	195 lb (88 kg)	1899-01-24	Duquesne
G/F		Steve Olszewski	5 ft 7 in (1.70 m)	155 lb (70 kg)	1902-03-11	No college
G/F		Honey Russell	6 ft 0 in (1.83 m)	180 lb (82 kg)	1902-05-31	Alexander Hamilton HS (NY)
G/F		Red Skurnick	5 ft 10 in (1.78 m)		1904-04-15	Savage School of Physical Education
G/F		Bill Vincent	5 ft 5 in (1.65 m)	150 lb (68 kg)	1903-01-05	No college

Coaches
Head coach

Marty Friedman

Legend
- (DP) Unsigned draft pick
- (FA) Free agent
- (S) Suspended
- Injured

Note: Moon Klinzing, Steve Olszewski, Honey Russell, Red Skurnick, and Bill Vincent would not be a part of the roster by the time they competed in the ABL championship series against the Original Celtics under their temporary Brooklyn Celtics name (technically speaking) for this season only.

== American Basketball League Standings ==
First Half
Team	Wins	Losses	Winning %
Cleveland Rosenblums	17	4	.810
Washington Palace Five / Laundrymen	16	5	.762
Philadelphia Quakers / Phillies*	14	7	.667
Brooklyn Arcadians/Brooklyn Celtics**	13	8	.619
Fort Wayne Hoosiers	8	13	.381
Rochester Centrals	8	13	.381
Chicago Bruins	7	14	.333
Baltimore Orioles	1	20	.048
Detroit Pulaski Post Five / Pulaski / Lions†	0	6	.000

* – The Philadelphia Sphas would replace the Philadelphia Quakers during the second half of the season, albeit while playing under the original Philadelphia Warriors name instead of their typical Philadelphia SPHAs name.
** – After playing only in five total games this season (all of which ended in defeats), the Brooklyn Arcadians would have their franchise rights be both transferred and replaced by the Original Celtics franchise under the temporarily implemented name of the Brooklyn Celtics for the rest of this season in the ABL.
† – Withdrew from the ABL after playing only six total games during the first half of this season, with their games being stricken from the official league record books during this season.

Second Half
Team	Wins	Losses	Winning %
Brooklyn Celtics*	19	2	.905
Fort Wayne Hoosiers	15	6	.714
Washington Palace Five / Laundrymen	14	7	.667
Philadelphia Warriors**	10	11	.476
Cleveland Rosenblums	9	12	.429
Chicago Bruins	6	15	.286
Rochester Centrals	6	15	.286
Baltimore Orioles	5	16	.238

* – After playing only five total games this season (all of which ended in defeats), the Brooklyn Arcadians would have their franchise rights be both transferred and replaced by the Original Celtics franchise under the temporarily implemented name of the Brooklyn Celtics for the rest of this season in the ABL.
** – The Philadelphia Sphas would replace the Philadelphia Quakers during the second half of the season, albeit while playing under the original Philadelphia Warriors name instead of their typical Philadelphia SPHAs name.

== American Basketball League Championship Series ==
Cleveland Rosenblums (1st Half Champions) Vs. Brooklyn Celtics (2nd Half Champions): Brooklyn Celtics win series 3–0

- Game 1: April 6, 1927 @ Cleveland: Brooklyn Celtics 29, Cleveland Rosenblums 21
- Game 2: April 7, 1927 @ Cleveland: Brooklyn Celtics 28, Cleveland Rosenblums 20
- Game 3: April 9, 1927 @ Brooklyn: Brooklyn Celtics 35, Cleveland Rosenblums 32

A more detailed analysis of the 1927 ABL championship series of games played can be found on APBR.org.
