= 1925–26 Cleveland Rosenblums season =

- League champions
- League: American Basketball League (original)
- Head coach: Marty Friedman (player-coach)
- General manager: Max Rosenblum
- Owner(s): Max Rosenblum
- Arena: Public Hall Auditorium

Results
- Record: 23–7 (.767)
- Place: Conference: 3rd (1st half); 1st (2nd half)
- Playoff finish: ABL Champions (Won 3–0 over Brooklyn Arcadians)

The 1925–26 Cleveland Rosenblums season was both the Rosenblums' first season of existence as a professional franchise (after previously playing by as early as 1919 in an independent basis under the Rosenblum Credits name and sometimes having their team name being shortened down to the Rosies) and the first season of existence for the American Basketball League, which was the first professional basketball league that had truly attempted to go fully national after previous professional basketball leagues were mostly regional at the time. The American Basketball League's inaugural season would have nine teams competing in that season (while a tenth team in East Liverpool, Ohio was intended to join the Rosenblums and the other eight teams in question for this season, the East Liverpool team ultimately withdrew operations before the season even began properly, with other failed locations that had submitted entries to start the ABL's inaugural season including Baltimore, Maryland (who eventually got their own team the following season); Milwaukee, Wisconsin; and two more locations in the state of Ohio via Columbus and Camden), though the ABL would compete in a split season format with two half seasons being utilized instead of one whole season being utilized throughout the season (which would be the case throughout the majority of the league's existence in the first place). However, by the time the first half of the season ended and the second half of the season began, the Boston Whirlwinds would officially be expelled from the ABL on February 11, 1926 due to a dispute over player contracts (though some sources claim they withdrew from the ABL instead due to poor attendance numbers for their home games), which led to the ABL entering the second half of the season with only eight teams remaining in their league this time around. In any case, the first season for the Rosenblums (who sometimes had their team name shortened up into the Rosies) would prove to be an incredibly successful one for the team that was owned by Max Rosenblum. During the first half of the season, Cleveland would be one of the best teams of the entire league with a 10–6 record, which would have the Rosenblums finish that half of the season in third place behind only that of the Washington Palace Five team and the eventual first half champions in the Brooklyn Arcadians. However, the second half of the season would see the Cleveland Rosenblums go nearly undefeated throughout that entire half of the season, as they would lose only one game out of the 14 total games played in that half of the season for an obvious first-place finish for the second half of the season with a nearly undefeated 13–1 record. This would lead to the Rosenblums getting the best overall record of the ABL season with a 23–7 record, with the ABL's inaugural championship series pitting the first half champion Brooklyn Arcadians against the second half champion Cleveland Rosenblums to determine the overall league champions due to the aforementioned split season format, with Cleveland ultimately sweeping the Arcadians with a 3–0 series victory to win the inaugural ABL championship for this season.

== Roster ==
Due to information on American Basketball League players being generally hard to find, there are bound to be more gaps and/or inaccuracies found in certain areas on the team's roster spots than usual.

1925–26 Cleveland Rosenblums roster
Players

Pos.	No.	Player	Height	Weight	DOB	From
C		Rich Deighan	6 ft 3 in (1.91 m)	200 lb (91 kg)	1900-02-03	No college
C		Gil Ely	6 ft 2 in (1.88 m)	175 lb (79 kg)	1898-09-27	Michigan
G/F		Marty Friedman	5 ft 8 in (1.73 m)	135 lb (61 kg)	1889-07-12	NYU
F		Dutch Guenther	6 ft 1 in (1.85 m)	180 lb (82 kg)	1899-02-01	No college
G/F		Nat Hickey	5 ft 11 in (1.80 m)	190 lb (86 kg)	1902-01-30	Hoboken HS (NJ)
G/F		Carl Husta	5 ft 11 in (1.80 m)	175 lb (79 kg)	1902-04-08	No college
G/F		Dave Kerr	6 ft 2 in (1.88 m)	195 lb (88 kg)	1896-02-03	Central HS (PA)
G/F		Honey Russell	6 ft 0 in (1.83 m)	180 lb (82 kg)	1902-05-31	Alexander Hamilton HS (NY)
G/F		Abe Schreiber	5 ft 9 in (1.75 m)	165 lb (75 kg)	1898-05-14	Ohio Northern
G/F		Len Shepherd	6 ft 0 in (1.83 m)	175 lb (79 kg)	1914-09-25	No college

Coaches
Head coach

Marty Friedman

Legend
- (DP) Unsigned draft pick
- (FA) Free agent
- (S) Suspended
- Injured

Note: Abe Schreiber would not be a part of the team's championship series roster, while Gil Ely from the Detroit Pulaski Post Five team would end up joining the Cleveland Rosenblums for the team's ABL championship series run.

== American Basketball League Standings ==
First Half
Team	Wins	Losses	Winning %
Brooklyn Arcadians	12	4	.750
Washington Palace Five / Laundrymen	11	5	.688
Cleveland Rosenblums	10	6	.625
Rochester Centrals	9	7	.562
Fort Wayne Caseys	7	9	.438
Chicago Bruins	6	10	.375
Detroit Pulaski Post Five	6	10	.375
Boston Whirlwinds^{×}	6	10	.375
Buffalo Bisons / Germans	5	11	.322

× – The Boston Whirlwinds were expelled by the end of the first half of the season due to a dispute over player contracts.

Second Half
Team	Wins	Losses	Winning %
Cleveland Rosenblums	13	1	.919
Washington Palace Five / Laundrymen	11	3	.786
Rochester Centrals	9	5	.643
Brooklyn Arcadians	7	7	.500
Fort Wayne Caseys	6	8	.429
Buffalo Bisons / Germans	5	9	.357
Chicago Bruins	3	11	.214
Detroit Pulaski Post Five	2	12	.143

== ABL Championship Series ==
Brooklyn Arcadians (1st Half Champions) Vs. Cleveland Rosenblums (2nd Half Champions): Cleveland Rosenblums win series 3–0

- Game 1: April 7, 1926 @ Cleveland: Cleveland Rosenblums 36, Brooklyn Arcadians 33
- Game 2: April 8, 1926 @ Cleveland: Cleveland Rosenblums 37, Brooklyn Arcadians 21
- Game 3: April 9, 1926 @ Manhattan: Cleveland Rosenblums 23, Brooklyn Arcadians 22

A more detailed analysis of the inaugural 1926 ABL championship series of games played can be found on APBR.org.
