= 1928–29 Fort Wayne Hoosiers season =

- League: American Basketball League (original)
- Head coach: Ralph Miller (player-coach)
- General manager: Johnny Whitty (off-season?); Unknown during the season. (Ralph Miller?)
- Owner(s): C. L. Alter
- Arena: South Side High School Gymnasium

Results
- Record: 29–13 (.690)
- Place: Conference: 2nd (1st half); 1st (2nd half)
- Playoff finish: Lost ABL championship series 0–4 to the Cleveland Rosenblums

The 1928–29 Fort Wayne Hoosiers season was both the Hoosiers' fourth season of existence as a professional franchise (albeit after previously playing their first professional season under the Fort Wayne Caseys name, though the Hoosiers were also sometimes referred to as the Guards instead) in the city of Fort Wayne, Indiana and the fourth season of existence for the American Basketball League. ABL was the first professional basketball league that had truly attempted to go fully national after previous professional basketball leagues were mostly regional at the time. During the off-season, the ABL had entered a crossroads of sorts where the league's popularity was considered to be rather high, but it came at the cost of the Original Celtics dominating the rest of the competition and risked ending the rest of the league due to games featuring the Original Celtics (usually) showcasing high attendance values upon road matches (to the point where some crowds would chant "Break up the Celtics!"), but often displaying poor attendance values for the rest of the games in the league by comparison (to the point where only five teams looked certain to enter this season originally). Not only that, but the Celtics' own team owner, Jim Furey, would have to go to prison during this upcoming season due to him embezzling $187,000 from a company he worked with in his spare time called the Arnold Constable Corporation. This combination of factors alongside the change of league presidents from NFL president Joseph Carr to former Interstate Basketball League and Metropolitan Basketball League creator and president, Naismith Basketball Hall of Famer John J. O'Brien, led to the ABL accepting the wishes of both the fans and other league owners in breaking up the Original Celtics (and having them replaced by the New York Hakoahs for this season by extension) in order to help bolster other ABL teams up for plans of long-term success going forward. However, the way the ABL ended up implementing the forced changes upon the Original Celtics' players upon other ABL teams would ultimately hurt the league in the long-term, as most of them would end up going to the Cleveland Rosenblums instead of being more evenly distributed among the rest of the ABL teams that were entering this season, including the temporary addition of the New York Hakoahs and the former Metropolitan Basketball League teams known as the Trenton Royal Bengals and the Paterson Crescents under the Paterson Whirlwinds name.

Entering this season properly, the Hoosiers would end up being one of eight ABL teams competing in the league this season, with this season being the most stable of the league's entire history (at least in terms of its original existence). During the first half of the season, they would be one game behind the Cleveland Rosenblums (though also being three games ahead of both the former Metropolitan Basketball League team known as the Brooklyn Visitations and the surprising surging Chicago Bruins) to finish that half of the season in second place with an above-average 18–10 record. Luckily for the Hoosiers, the second half of the season would have them finishing a game ahead of both the Cleveland Rosenblums and the Brooklyn Visitations to end that half with a first place through an above-average 11–3 record. As a result of this finish, the ABL would see the two best teams of the league this season in the Cleveland Rosenblums and the Fort Wayne Hoosiers (both of whom would coincidentally finish the overall season with a season-best 29–13 record) compete in a revised ABL championship series that would now be a best-of-seven series instead of a best-of-five series due in part to the league anticipating that the series would be just as competitive for the championship as the two teams were against each other throughout the entire season combined with the ABL returning to a split season format after previously using a proper regular season format that included an actual playoff format during the previous season as well. Unfortunately for both the ABL and the Hoosiers alike, the championship series between the two teams would prove to be rather anticlimactic by comparison to the way they performed against each other throughout the season, as Fort Wayne would end up being swept by the Rosenblums in four straight games to have Cleveland return to their championship glory within the ABL once again, denying the Fort Wayne Hoosiers of their first championship in the ABL along the way.

== Roster ==
Due to information on American Basketball League players being generally hard to find, there are bound to be more gaps and/or inaccuracies found in certain areas on the team's roster spots than usual.

Player	Position
Bennie Borgmann	G/F
Shang Chadwick	C
Gaza Chizmadia	F/C
George Glasco	G/F
Mark Harper	C
Bill McElwain	F
Ralph Miller	G
Elmer Ripley	G
Rusty Saunders	F/C
Frank Shimek	G

Note: Gaza Chizmadia, Mark Harper, and Elmer Ripley would not be a part of the team's final roster for the ABL championship series for this season.

== American Basketball League Standings ==
First Half
Team	Wins	Losses	Winning %
Cleveland Rosenblums	19	9	.679
Fort Wayne Hoosiers	18	10	.643
Brooklyn Visitations	15	12	.556
Chicago Bruins	15	12	.556
New York Hakoahs	13	16	.448
Trenton (Royal) Bengals	12	16	.429
Rochester Centrals	11	15	.423
Paterson Whirlwinds	6	19	.240

Second Half
Team	Wins	Losses	Winning %
Fort Wayne Hoosiers	11	3	.786
Cleveland Rosenblums	10	4	.714
Brooklyn Visitations	10	4	.714
Rochester Centrals	7	7	.500
New York Hakoahs	5	9	.357
Trenton (Royal) Bengals	4	8	.333
Chicago Bruins	4	10	.286
Paterson Whirlwinds	3	9	.250

== American Basketball League Championship Series ==
Cleveland Rosenblums (1st Half Champions) Vs. Fort Wayne Hoosiers (2nd Half Champions): Cleveland Rosenblums win series 4–0

- Game 1: March 27, 1929 @ Cleveland: Cleveland Rosenblums 24, Fort Wayne Hoosiers 17
- Game 2: March 28, 1929 @ Cleveland: Cleveland Rosenblums 28, Fort Wayne Hoosiers 23
- Game 3: March 30, 1929 @ Fort Wayne: Cleveland Rosenblums 19, Fort Wayne Hoosiers 18
- Game 4: April 1, 1929 @ Fort Wayne: Cleveland Rosenblums 30, Fort Wayne Hoosiers 22

== Awards and honors ==
By the end of the season, Bennie Borgmann would end up being the leading scorer of the entire league in its fourth season of existence with 325 points scored for an average of 7.7 points per game. As of 2026, Borgmann remains the only leading scorer in the original ABL's history to enter the Naismith Basketball Hall of Fame due to his entry in 1961, with Bobby McDermott in the league's revived history years later joining him as the only other leading scorer in league history to enter the Hall of Fame alongside him. However, it's suggested that the leading scorer of the ABL for this season would not be Borgmann this time around, but Nat Hickey of the Cleveland Rosenblums and Chicago Bruins instead due to him scoring a total of 344 points scored for an average of 7.6 points per game under 45 games played during this season.
