= 1926–27 Fort Wayne Hoosiers season =

- League: American Basketball League (original)
- Head coach: Ralph Miller & Bennie Borgmann (player-coaches)
- General manager: Johnny Whitty (partially?); Unknown once the Brooklyn Celtics entered the ABL.
- Owner(s): C. L. Alter
- Arena: South Side High School Gymnasium

Results
- Record: 23–19 (.548)
- Place: Conference: T–5th (1st half); 2nd (2nd half)
- Playoff finish: Did not qualify

The 1926–27 Fort Wayne Hoosiers season was both the Hoosiers' second season of existence as a professional franchise (though they were sometimes referred to as the Guards) after having had their first professional season go under the Fort Wayne Caseys name in the city of Fort Wayne, Indiana and the second season of existence for the American Basketball League, which was the first professional basketball league that had truly attempted to go fully national after previous professional basketball leagues were mostly regional at the time. For the second straight season in a row, the American Basketball League would start out their season with nine teams competing in the split season formatting, with the two half seasons being utilized instead of one whole season being utilized throughout the entire season (which would be the case throughout the majority of the league's existence in the first place). However, unlike the previous season of play, not only would the original Brooklyn Arcadians team (sometimes referred to as the Brooklyn Rockets) end up being replaced by the Original Celtics under the temporary distinction of the Brooklyn Celtics for this season only, but the Detroit Pulaski Post Five / Lions would end up folding operations after six straight losses to their season (and by extension, get their record officially stricken from the record books entirely), with the Philadelphia Quakers / Phillies team also later being replaced by the Philadelphia Sphas under the Philadelphia Warriors name that would inspire the future Golden State Warriors NBA team by the time the second half of the season began. In spite of the early uncertainties involved at the time, the newly rebranded Fort Wayne franchise would still remain (relatively) intact as a franchise, although when the Original Celtics entered the ABL following their strongman move against the "original" National Basketball League that the Celtics previously took part in, the Hoosiers would end up losing general manager Johnny Whitty for the rest of the season (most likely speaking) due to him returning to his primary role as player-coach for the Original Celtics (now known as the Brooklyn Celtics for this season due to them taking over the spot that was previously held by the Brooklyn Arcadians for this season) out in the ABL. Despite remaining intact (at least for the most part) as a franchise during the first half of the season, the Hoosiers would end up tying the Rochester Centrals with a below-average 8–13 record for a fifth-place finish to be ahead of only the Chicago Bruins and the Baltimore Orioles expansion team in terms of teams that actually survived the first half of the season properly. Luckily for the Hoosiers, they would perform a lot better for the second half of the season than they did the first half of the season due to the beneficial results of the ABL's strongman moves they did over the rivaling NBL earlier in the season, to the point where they'd have their first winning record as a professional team with a 15–6 record to end the second half of the season (thus giving them an above-average finish to their overall season this time around). Unfortunately for the Hoosiers, despite them being more improved for the second half of the season, they would still finish that half of the season in second place behind the "Original" Brooklyn Celtics nearly going undefeated with a 19–2 season, meaning the Hoosiers failed to qualify for the 1927 ABL championship series in the process due to the surprise addition of the Original Celtics under the Brooklyn Celtics name taking over for the Brooklyn Arcadians for the rest of the season. To add insult to injury for the Hoosiers, the Celtics would end up winning the championship series over the first half champions of the season, the defending inaugural ABL champion Cleveland Rosenblums, by sweeping them 3–0 to conclude the season.

== Roster ==
Due to information on American Basketball League players being generally hard to find, there are bound to be more gaps and/or inaccuracies found in certain areas on the team's roster spots than usual.

Player	Position
Bennie Borgmann	G/F
Shang Chadwick	C
Bob Griebe	F/C
Bill McElwain	F
Biz Miller	F
Ralph Miller	G
Tony Schiffer	G/F
Len Shepherd	G/F
Frank Shimek	G
Homer Stonebreaker	F
Paul White	G/F
Al Zingone	G/F

== American Basketball League Standings ==
First Half
Team	Wins	Losses	Winning %
Cleveland Rosenblums	17	4	.810
Washington Palace Five / Laundrymen	16	5	.762
Philadelphia Quakers / Phillies*	14	7	.667
Brooklyn Arcadians/Brooklyn Celtics**	13	8	.619
Fort Wayne Hoosiers	8	13	.381
Rochester Centrals	8	13	.381
Chicago Bruins	7	14	.333
Baltimore Orioles	1	20	.048
Detroit Pulaski Post Five / Lions†	0	6	.000

* – The Philadelphia Sphas would replace the Philadelphia Quakers during the second half of the season, albeit while playing under the original Philadelphia Warriors name instead of their typical Philadelphia SPHAs name.
** – After playing only in five total games this season (all of which ended in defeats), the Brooklyn Arcadians would have their franchise rights be both transferred and replaced by the Original Celtics franchise under the temporarily implemented name of the Brooklyn Celtics for the rest of this season in the ABL.
† – Withdrew from the ABL after playing only six total games during the first half of this season, with their games being stricken from the official league record books during this season.

Second Half
Team	Wins	Losses	Winning %
Brooklyn Celtics*	19	2	.905
Fort Wayne Hoosiers	15	6	.714
Washington Palace Five / Laundrymen	14	7	.667
Philadelphia Warriors**	10	11	.476
Cleveland Rosenblums	9	12	.429
Chicago Bruins	6	15	.286
Rochester Centrals	6	15	.286
Baltimore Orioles	5	16	.238

* – After playing only five total games this season (all of which ended in defeats), the Brooklyn Arcadians would have their franchise rights be both transferred and replaced by the Original Celtics franchise under the temporarily implemented name of the Brooklyn Celtics for the rest of this season in the ABL.
** – The Philadelphia Sphas would replace the Philadelphia Quakers during the second half of the season, albeit while playing under the original Philadelphia Warriors name instead of their typical Philadelphia SPHAs name.
