= 1949–50 Hartford Hurricanes season =

American Basketball League season

- League: American Basketball League (revived original)
- Head coach: Tubby Raskin (1–4); Ralph Kaplowitz (10–22)
- General manager: Tubby Raskin(?); Ralph Kaplowitz(?)
- Arena: Unknown (Colt Armory?)

Results
- Record: 11–26 (.297)
- Place: Conference: 6th
- Playoff finish: Did not qualify

The 1949–50 Hartford Hurricanes season was the fourth and final season of the franchise and the third and final season (and second and final full season) of the Hartford Hurricanes (who were sometimes referred to as the Hartford Caps instead for at least the 1948–49 season) from Hartford, Connecticut in the revived (yet weakened up) form of the American Basketball League. Entering this season, Hartford would once again be one of eight teams competing in the league to start out the season, although it would later conclude with only six teams remaining in the ABL by the end of the season. Originally, former ABL player Tubby Raskin (from the inaugural season's Brooklyn Arcadians roster) would coach the Hurricanes for the start of the season, but after another poor start to their time in the ABL, Raskin would be replaced with player-coach Ralph Kaplowitz for the rest of the season going forward. The change would do very little to fix the team's overall situation, as not only would Hartford get a below-average 11–26 record for a sixth place finish that put them ahead of only the since-defunct Schenectady Packers and Trenton Tigers turned Cohoes Marras (and thus easily failed to qualify for the ABL Playoffs), but it would also lead to the Hurricanes leaving the ABL after the season's conclusion and folding operations not long afterward. Interestingly, this season would feature former City College of New York guard Lou Lipman (alternatively known as Louis Lipman) as a player on their team; Lipman would have his only professional basketball season played this season while competing with Hartford after previously being on the short-lived Schenectady Packers this season before being arrested as one of 34 (later 35) players to be involved in the 1951 college basketball point-shaving scandal.

== Roster ==
Due to information on American Basketball League players being generally hard to find (especially by the time the ABL was designated more as a minor league during its later years of existence), there are bound to be more gaps and/or inaccuracies found in certain areas on the team's roster spots than usual.

Player	Position(s)
Dick Adair	Unknown
Johnny Bach	G/F
Edward Bartels	F
Hank Beenders	C/F
Frank Bores	Unknown
Martin "Kelly" Brofman	Unknown
Paul Campbell	G
Johnny Ezersky	G/F
George Feigenbaum	G
Stan Fronczak	Unknown
Jack Garfinkel	G
Dick Hammock	G/F
Bob Hubbard	C/F
Arnold Jones	C
Ralph Kaplowitz	G/F
Herb Krautblatt	G
Fred Lewis	G
Lou Lipman	G
Frank Mangiapane	G
Elmore Morganthaler	C
John O'Brien	G
Charlie Parsley	G
Len Rader	G/F
Sam "Barucci" Roth	Unknown
Jerry Rullo	G
John Seagrist	C
Tom Sealy	G
Fran Walsh	G/F
Ken Walters	G
Sonny Wood	G

== American Basketball League Standings ==
Pos.	Team	Wins	Losses	Win %
1	Scranton Miners	27	11	.711
2	Bridgeport Aer-A-Sols	22	13	.629
3	Wilkes-Barre Barons	21	17	.552
4	New York / Saratoga Harlem Yankees*^{[a]}	21	17	.552
5	Paterson Crescents	17	18	.486
6	Hartford Hurricanes	11	26	.297
7	Trenton Tigers / Cohoes Marras**†^{[b]}	4	16	.200
8	Schenectady Packers†^{[c]}	0	4	.000

† – Did not survive the ABL season.
* – The New York Harlem Yankees moved to Saratoga, New York (though they presumably played some of their games in Schenectady, New York) during the season.
** – The Trenton Tigers would end up moving to Cohoes, New York after being without a home venue for a month straight before later folding operations without winning a single game in Cohoes under their new Cohoes Marras name.

== Notes ==
^{a} The New York Harlem Yankees moved to Saratoga, New York (though they presumably played some of their games in Schenectady, New York) to become the Saratoga Harlem Yankees at some currently unknown point in time during this season.
^{b} The Trenton Tigers would move to Cohoes, New York to become the Cohoes Marras on January 7, 1950 after previously playing as a road team only from December 11-28, 1949 (with their road trip leading to nothing but defeats) before the Trenton Tigers turned Cohoes Marras folded operations by either January 30 or February 1, 1950.
^{c} The Schenectady Packers would end up dropping out of the ABL on November 23, 1949.
