= 1930–31 Fort Wayne Hoosiers season =

- League: American Basketball League (original)
- Head coach: Ralph Miller (1st half); Clarence Alter (2nd half)
- General manager: Ralph Miller(?)
- Owner(s): C. L. Alter
- Arena: Fort Wayne Auditorium

Results
- Record: 26–14 (.650)
- Place: Conference: 2nd (1st half); T–1st (2nd half)
- Playoff finish: Lost ABL championship series 2–4 to the Brooklyn Visitations

The 1930–31 Fort Wayne Hoosiers season was both the Hoosiers' sixth (and potentially final) season of existence as a professional franchise (albeit after previously playing their first professional season under the Fort Wayne Caseys name, though the Hoosiers were also sometimes referred to as the Guards instead) in the city of Fort Wayne, Indiana and the sixth and final season of existence for the original American Basketball League, which was the first professional basketball league that had truly attempted to go fully national after previous professional basketball leagues were mostly regional at the time. For the fifth and final time in the six original seasons that the ABL first had within that original era of existence, the American Basketball League would utilize the split season formatting, though unlike their other seasons of existence, they would only see seven teams competing in the two half seasons being utilized this time around instead of eight or nine teams with one whole season being utilized throughout that entire period of time (which would be the case throughout the majority of the league's existence in the first place). Worse yet for the ABL, similar to the previous season, two teams in the first half of the season would end up dropping out of the season with average records on their ends, with the long-standing, champion favorite Cleveland Rosenblums dropping out of the ABL by December 8, 1930, with a 6–6 record and the (original) Paterson Crescents dropping out of the ABL on December 30, 1930, with a 9–9 record. Despite the dangerous worries at hand with the season potentially not even completing itself properly at times, the Hoosiers would still complete the first half of the season with an above-average 13–9 record to be one and a half games behind the Brooklyn Visitations for first place, meaning they ultimately had to settle for second place to end the first half of the season on their ends. As for the second half of the season, Fort Wayne would surprisingly go down to the wire with the Chicago Bruins of all teams throughout that half of the season before they both ended the season with an above-average 11–5 record, meaning the ABL would host a technical playoff setting where the Hoosiers and the Bruins would compete in a best-of-three second half first place tiebreaker series to determine who would be the true winner of that particular half of the season before the winning team ended up competing in the (final) ABL championship series (in its original rendition) against the winning team of the first half of the season, the Brooklyn Visitations. Luckily for the Hoosiers, they would end up routing the Bruins to sweep them 2–0 to be the official winners of the second half first place tiebreaker series, meaning Fort Wayne had one last chance at winning the ABL championship against the former Metropolitan Basketball League team in Brooklyn that's now competing in the ABL instead. In this ABL championship series, it would become the most competitive championship series of the original league's entire history, as despite the series seeing some really low final scores, it would also see a double-overtime game (that the Hoosiers would win in) with the series going as high as six games played in the best-of-seven series played. Unfortunately, Fort Wayne would end up losing the final ABL championship for the original league's existence, as the Brooklyn Visitations would win 4–2 over the Hoosiers in that league's final season of existence before officially suspending operations for the next two seasons due to the long-term effects of the Great Depression despite initially planning to have the 1931–32 hold 16 teams competing in an Eastern and Western Division for that season (with the ABL later returning in the 1933–34 in a different manner with the Visitations at hand being there to help establish a connection between the old and new ABL as one and the same leagues there). As for the Fort Wayne Hoosiers themselves, after waiting around (potentially being an independent team) for the 1931–32 season, it's suggested that they would end up returning to being a professional team in the 1932–33 for a different version of the National Professional Basketball League that also featured the Toledo Red Man Tobaccos (competing under the Toledo Crimson Coaches Tobaccos) alongside future National Basketball League teams in the Akron Firestone Non-Skids, the Akron Goodyear Wingfoots, and the Indianapolis Kautskys with Fort Wayne (potentially) competing under the Fort Wayne Chiefs name instead.

== Roster ==
Due to information on American Basketball League players being generally hard to find, there are bound to be more gaps and/or inaccuracies found in certain areas on the team's roster spots than usual.

| Player | Position |
|---|---|
| Jim Baker | G |
| Shang Chadwick | C |
| Carl Husta | F |
| Hank Kowalczyk | F/C |
| Bud Lindenberg | G/F |
| Branch McCracken | G/F |
| Ralph Miller | G |
| Ward Myers | G/F |
| Rusty Saunders | F/C |
| Frank Shimek | G |

Note: Jim Baker, Bud Lindenberg, Branch McCracken, and player-coach Ralph Miller would not be a part of the team's official (playing) roster by the time they officially competed in the equivalent of the ABL playoffs for this season.

== American Basketball League Standings ==
First Half
| Team | Wins | Losses | Winning % |
|---|---|---|---|
| Brooklyn Visitations | 14 | 7 | .667 |
| Fort Wayne Hoosiers | 13 | 9 | .591 |
| Rochester Centrals | 10 | 9 | .526 |
| Toledo Red Man Tobaccos | 8 | 13 | .381 |
| Chicago Bruins | 7 | 14 | .333 |
| Cleveland Rosenblums* | 6 | 6 | .500 |
| Paterson Crescents** | 9 | 9 | .500 |

* – The two-time defending ABL champions (and three-time overall ABL champions) in the Cleveland Rosenblums would surprisingly end up dropping out of the league on December 8, 1930, due to the long-term effects of the Great Depression kicking in for them.
** – The (original) Paterson Crescents franchise would end up dropping out of the league near the end of the first half of the season on December 30, 1930.

Second Half
| Team | Wins | Losses | Winning % |
|---|---|---|---|
| Fort Wayne Hoosiers | 11 | 5 | .688 |
| Chicago Bruins | 11 | 5 | .688 |
| Brooklyn Visitations | 8 | 8 | .500 |
| Rochester Centrals | 5 | 10 | .333 |
| Toledo Red Man Tobaccos | 4 | 11 | .274 |

== ABL Playoffs ==
While the ABL technically wouldn't hold a traditional playoff format this season, they would hold a tiebreaker playoff series for determine the official first-place winner for the second half of the season to go alongside the actual championship series for the overall ABL season this time around due to the Fort Wayne Hoosiers tying their first-place result with the Chicago Bruins for the second half of this season.

=== ABL Second Half First Place Tiebreaker Series ===
Both the Chicago Bruins and the Fort Wayne Hoosiers would compete in a best-of-three series, with the winning team in this series being able to automatically qualify for the ABL's championship series as the second half first place team competing against the first half first place team this season, the Brooklyn Visitations. Luckily for the Hoosiers, they would sweep the Bruins in the two games they played in the best-of-three series played after the end of the second half of that season and advanced to the ABL's championship series to go up against the first half champions of the league, which were the Brooklyn Visitations (who had an above-average 14–7 first half for their season, but held just an average 8–8 second half for their season for a third-place finish behind the two teams that played the first place tiebreaker series just recently).

- Game 1: February 28, 1931 @ Chicago: Fort Wayne 25, Chicago 11
- Game 2: March 1, 1931 @ Fort Wayne: Fort Wayne 20, Chicago 16

=== ABL Championship Series ===
Brooklyn Visitations (1st Half Champions) Vs. Fort Wayne Hoosiers (2nd Half Tiebreaker Champions): Brooklyn Visitations win series 4–2

- Game 1: March 5, 1931 @ Brooklyn: Brooklyn Visitations 14, Fort Wayne Hoosiers 10
- Game 2: March 8, 1931 @ Brooklyn: Brooklyn Visitations 21, Fort Wayne Hoosiers 13
- Game 3: March 10, 1931 @ Fort Wayne: Fort Wayne Hoosiers 24, Brooklyn Visitations 20
- Game 4: March 11, 1931: Fort Wayne Hoosiers 30, Brooklyn Visitations 26 (2OT @ Fort Wayne)
- Game 5: March 13, 1931 @ Fort Wayne: Brooklyn Visitations 18, Fort Wayne Hoosiers 13
- Game 6: March 15, 1931 @ Brooklyn: Brooklyn Visitations 24, Fort Wayne Hoosiers 18

This would later end up becoming the final championship series held by the original American Basketball League, as they would suspend operations for the next two seasons due to the long-term effects of the Great Depression. While the ABL would later return to action for the 1933–34 season under the same management and a select few teams from the original ABL's history (including the same Brooklyn Visitations team from this version of the ABL) in order to maintain the revived ABL's connection with the original ABL (and essentially have its history be one and the same with itself), the revived version of the American Basketball League would ultimately end up downgrading its scope to becoming more of a regional professional basketball league instead of the initially intended national professional basketball league that this version of the ABL was going for here. In addition to that, the final game played between the two teams would end up being considered the first professional basketball game to have a play-by-play account of a game occur throughout multiple locations at once, in this case going from Brooklyn, New York to Fort Wayne, Indiana.
