= 1928–29 Cleveland Rosenblums season =

- League champions
- League: American Basketball League (original)
- Head coach: Dave Kerr (player-coach)
- General manager: Max Rosenblum
- Owner(s): Max Rosenblum
- Arena: Public Hall Auditorium

Results
- Record: 29–13 (.690)
- Place: Conference: 1st (1st half); T–2nd (2nd half)
- Playoff finish: ABL Champions (Won 4–0 over Fort Wayne Hoosiers)

The 1928–29 Cleveland Rosenblums season was both the Rosenblums' fourth season of existence as a professional franchise (after previously playing by as early as 1919 in an independent basis under the Rosenblum Credits name and sometimes having their team name being shortened down to the Rosies) and the fourth season of existence for the American Basketball League, which was the first professional basketball league that had truly attempted to go fully national after previous professional basketball leagues were mostly regional at the time. During the offseason, the ABL had entered a crossroads of sorts where the league's popularity was considered to be rather high, but it came at the cost of the Original Celtics dominating the rest of the competition and risked ending the rest of the league due to games featuring the Original Celtics (usually) showcasing high attendance values upon road matches (to the point where some crowds would chant "Break up the Celtics!"), but often displaying poor attendance values for the rest of the games in the league by comparison (to the point where only five teams looked certain to enter this season originally). Not only that, but the Celtics' own team owner, Jim Furey, would have to go to prison during this upcoming season due to him embezzling $187,000 from a company he worked with in his spare time called the Arnold Constable Corporation. This combination of factors alongside the change of league presidents from NFL president Joseph Carr to former Interstate Basketball League and Metropolitan Basketball League creator and president, Naismith Basketball Hall of Famer John J. O'Brien, led to the ABL accepting the wishes of both the fans and other league owners in breaking up the Original Celtics (and having them replaced by the New York Hakoahs for this season by extension) in order to help bolster other ABL teams up for plans of long-term success going forward. In the case of the Cleveland Rosenblums, they would get the bulk of the Original Celtics players joining their team with John "Pete" Barry, Dutch Dehnert, and Joe Lapchick (and later John Beckman) all sticking together out in Cleveland instead of having the Celtics' players be more fairly distributed within the ABL. This would lead to the Rosenblums being the new kings of the ABL for the rest of their existence going forward not long afterward.

Entering this season properly, the Rosenblums would end up being one of eight ABL teams competing in the league this season, with this season being the most stable of the league's entire history (at least in terms of its original existence). During the first half of the season, they would be one game ahead of the Fort Wayne Hoosiers to finish that half of the season in first place with an above-average 19–9 record with a chance to become automatic champions if they won the second half of the season soon afterward due to the ABL returning to the split season format that was used in their first two seasons of play. However, the second half of the season would see them tie up with the former MBL team known as the Brooklyn Visitations for a second place spot with an above-average 10–4 record, which saw them both be one game behind the Hoosiers for the first place spot in the second half of the season. This meant that the ABL would see the two best teams of the league this season in the Cleveland Rosenblums and the Fort Wayne Hoosiers compete in a revised ABL championship series that would now be a best-of-seven series instead of a best-of-five series due in part to the league anticipating that the series would be just as competitive for the championship as the two teams were against each other throughout the entire season. Unfortunately for the ABL, the championship series between the two teams would prove to be rather anticlimactic by comparison to the way they performed against each other throughout the season, as the Rosenblums would end up sweeping the Hoosiers in four straight games to return to their championship glory within the ABL once again. As such, it would prove that the Rosenblums were the big dogs of the ABL (once again) following the breaking up of the Original Celtics franchise from this season.

== Roster ==
Due to information on American Basketball League players being generally hard to find, there are bound to be more gaps and/or inaccuracies found in certain areas on the team's roster spots than usual.

1928–29 Cleveland Rosenblums roster
Players

Pos.	No.	Player	Height	Weight	DOB	From
G/F		Pete Barry	5 ft 11 in (1.80 m)	170 lb (77 kg)	1896-11-16	No college
G/F		John Beckman	5 ft 9 in (1.75 m)	160 lb (73 kg)	1895-10-26	St. Gabriel's Catholic School (NY)
F/C		Soup Campbell	6 ft 6 in (1.98 m)	200 lb (91 kg)	1904-12-11	No college
G/F		Dutch Dehnert	6 ft 0 in (1.83 m)	185 lb (84 kg)	1898-04-05	No college
C		Rich Deighan	6 ft 3 in (1.91 m)	200 lb (91 kg)	1900-02-03	No college
G/F		Nat Hickey	5 ft 11 in (1.80 m)	190 lb (86 kg)	1902-01-30	Hoboken HS (NJ)
G/F		Carl Husta	5 ft 11 in (1.80 m)	175 lb (79 kg)	1902-04-08	No college
G/F		Dave Kerr	6 ft 2 in (1.88 m)	195 lb (88 kg)	1896-02-03	Central HS (PA)
C		Joe Lapchick	6 ft 5 in (1.96 m)	185 lb (84 kg)	1900-04-12	No college
G/F		Pug Mahoney	5 ft 11 in (1.80 m)	180 lb (82 kg)	1909-07-21	No college
F/C		Leo Malone	6 ft 3 in (1.91 m)	190 lb (86 kg)	1890-12-12	No college
G/F		Hubs McCord	6 ft 0 in (1.83 m)	165 lb (75 kg)	1908-08-26	No college
G/F		Tony Schiffer	5 ft 9 in (1.75 m)	160 lb (73 kg)	1905-02-17	No college
G/F		Red Skurnick	5 ft 10 in (1.78 m)		1904-04-15	Savage School of Physical Education

Coaches
Head coach

Dave Kerr

Legend
- (DP) Unsigned draft pick
- (FA) Free agent
- (S) Suspended
- Injured

Note: The team's official, final (playing) roster once they entered the ABL championship series included John "Pete" Barry, John Beckman, Dutch Dehnert, Rich Deighan, Carl Husta, Joe Lapchick, and Red Skurnick, with player-coach Dave Kerr taking on the head coach role for the team during the championship series.

== American Basketball League Standings ==
First Half
Team	Wins	Losses	Winning %
Cleveland Rosenblums	19	9	.679
Fort Wayne Hoosiers	18	10	.643
Brooklyn Visitations	15	12	.556
Chicago Bruins	15	12	.556
New York Hakoahs	13	16	.448
Trenton (Royal) Bengals	12	16	.429
Rochester Centrals	11	15	.423
Paterson Whirlwinds	6	19	.240

Second Half
Team	Wins	Losses	Winning %
Fort Wayne Hoosiers	11	3	.786
Cleveland Rosenblums	10	4	.714
Brooklyn Visitations	10	4	.714
Rochester Centrals	7	7	.500
New York Hakoahs	5	9	.357
Trenton (Royal) Bengals	4	8	.333
Chicago Bruins	4	10	.286
Paterson Whirlwinds	3	9	.250

== American Basketball League Championship Series ==
Cleveland Rosenblums (1st Half Champions) Vs. Fort Wayne Hoosiers (2nd Half Champions): Cleveland Rosenblums win series 4–0

- Game 1: March 27, 1929 @ Cleveland: Cleveland Rosenblums 24, Fort Wayne Hoosiers 17
- Game 2: March 28, 1929 @ Cleveland: Cleveland Rosenblums 28, Fort Wayne Hoosiers 23
- Game 3: March 30, 1929 @ Fort Wayne: Cleveland Rosenblums 19, Fort Wayne Hoosiers 18
- Game 4: April 1, 1929 @ Fort Wayne: Cleveland Rosenblums 30, Fort Wayne Hoosiers 22
