= 1927–28 Fort Wayne Hoosiers season =

- Division champions
- League: American Basketball League (original)
- Head coach: Ralph Miller (5–3); Pop Morgenweck (22–21)
- General manager: Johnny Whitty (off-season?); Unknown during the season.
- Owner(s): C. L. Alter
- Arena: South Side High School Gymnasium

Results
- Record: 27–24 (.529)
- Place: Division: 1st (Western)
- Playoff finish: Lost ABL championship series 1–3 to the New York (Original) Celtics

The 1927–28 Fort Wayne Hoosiers season was both the Hoosiers' third season of existence as a professional franchise (albeit after previously playing their first professional season under the Fort Wayne Caseys name, though the Hoosiers were also sometimes referred to as the Guards instead) in the city of Fort Wayne, Indiana and the third season of existence for the American Basketball League, which was the first professional basketball league that had truly attempted to go fully national after previous professional basketball leagues were mostly regional at the time. For the first season ever in the league's history (and the only time in its inaugural period of existence), the ABL would abandon its split season formatting to have one whole regular season of play, with the eight teams there competing in two divisions of four teams each (with Fort Wayne competing in the Western Division, while teams such as the Original Celtics (labeled as the New York (Original) Celtics during this season) and the Philadelphia Warriors competed in the Eastern Division this season). While the Eastern Division was described as something more like a bloodbath to those that had witnessed the season at hand (to the point where the Washington Palace Five (/ Laundrymen) team would end up having their franchise rights be moved out and swapped around with the Brooklyn Visitations by what would unofficially be considered the start of the second half of the season on January 3, 1928, until the end of that franchise's existence (pretty much)), the Western Division was seen as more like a joke whose two best teams were already decided by the halfway point of the season due to the Detroit Cardinals / Olympians folding operations on January 3, 1928, as well following a doubleheader series victory they had, as well as the Chicago Bruins holding the worst record of the surviving teams left in the Western Division throughout this season. As a result of that factoid, the Hoosiers would see scant competition come their way within the Western Division, as they would be the only team with a winning record in the Western Division to end the season, which resulted in them having an easy first-place finish there. The scant competition would continue onward in the Western Division playoff series they had against the Cleveland Rosenblums (who made it to the playoff round despite them having a losing record this season), where the Hoosiers would sweep the Rosenblums 2–0 in the playoff series they had in order to qualify for the ABL championship series for the first time in their history, this time against the Original Celtics under the New York (Original) Celtics name. Interestingly, Fort Wayne would have home court advantage in this championship series despite them having a worse overall record than the Celtics, who had an insurmountable 40–9 record on their ends by comparison. While the Hoosiers would end up evening out the series with the Hoosiers winning Game 2 after the Celtics won Game 1, the strength of the Original Celtics would prove to be too much for Fort Wayne in the end, as the New York (Original) Celtics would end up repeating as ABL champions once again with a 3–1 championship series victory on their ends, denying the Hoosiers their first championship in the process.

== Roster ==
Due to information on American Basketball League players being generally hard to find, there are bound to be more gaps and/or inaccuracies found in certain areas on the team's roster spots than usual.

Player	Position
Bennie Borgmann	G/F
Shang Chadwick	C
Teddy Feldt	G/F
Bob Griebe	F/C
Nick Harvey	G
Pip Koehler	G
Bill McElwain	F
Ralph Miller	G
Rusty Saunders	F/C
Frank Shimek	G
Slim Shoun	C
Tillie Voss	C

Note: Teddy Feldt, Pip Koehler, Slim Shoun, and Tillie Voss would not be a part of the team's final ABL playoff roster for this season.

== American Basketball League Standings ==
=== Eastern Division ===
Eastern Division
Team	Wins	Losses	Winning %
New York (Original) Celtics	40	9	.816
Philadelphia Warriors	30	21	.588
Washington Palace Five (/ Laundrymen) / Brooklyn Visitations*	25	26	.490
Rochester Centrals	24	28	.462

* – The Washington Palace Five / Laundrymen franchise would have their franchise rights and record be transferred out to the Brooklyn Visitations by January 3, 1928, for the unofficial second half of the season.

=== Western Division ===
Western Division
Team	Wins	Losses	Winning %
Fort Wayne Hoosiers	27	24	.529
Cleveland Rosenblums	22	29	.431
Chicago Bruins	13	36	.265
Detroit Cardinals / Olympians†	5	13	.278

† – Withdrew from the ABL on January 3, 1928, by the start of the unofficial second half of the season.

== ABL Playoffs ==
For the first time in the ABL's history (and the only time during their initial run when attempting to be a national league instead of a regional league), the ABL would utilize a regular playoff format of sorts where the two best teams of each division would go up against each other before the winning team from each division would go up against each other in the championship series.

=== ABL Western Division Playoff ===
(1W) Fort Wayne Hoosiers Vs. (2W) Cleveland Rosenblums: Fort Wayne Hoosiers win series 2–0

- Game 1: March 14, 1928 @ Cleveland: Fort Wayne Hoosiers 22, Cleveland Rosenblums 15
- Game 2: March 16, 1928 @ Fort Wayne: Fort Wayne Hoosiers 31, Cleveland Rosenblums 25

=== ABL Championship Series ===
(1W) Fort Wayne Hoosiers Vs. (1E) New York (Original) Celtics: New York (Original) Celtics win series 3–1

- Game 1: March 21, 1928 @ Fort Wayne: New York (Original) Celtics 30, Fort Wayne Hoosiers 21
- Game 2: March 22, 1928 @ Fort Wayne: Fort Wayne Hoosiers 28, New York (Original) Celtics 21
- Game 3: March 23, 1928 @ Fort Wayne: New York (Original) Celtics 35, Fort Wayne Hoosiers 18
- Game 4: March 25, 1928 @ New York: New York (Original) Celtics 27, Fort Wayne Hoosiers 26
