= 1925–26 Fort Wayne Caseys season =

- League: American Basketball League (original)
- Head coach: Ralph Miller (3–6); Johnny Whitty (10–11)
- General manager: Johnny Whitty
- Owner(s): C. L. Alter
- Arena: South Side High School Gymnasium

Results
- Record: 13–17 (.433)
- Place: Conference: 5th (both halves)
- Playoff finish: Did not qualify

The 1925–26 Fort Wayne Caseys season was the first and only full professional basketball season of play for the Caseys team under that name (after previously being known as the Fort Wayne Knights of Columbus) in the city of Fort Wayne, Indiana under the original version of the American Basketball League, which was the first professional basketball league that had truly attempted to go fully national after previous professional basketball leagues were mostly regional at the time. The American Basketball League's inaugural season would have nine teams competing in that season (while a tenth team in East Liverpool, Ohio was intended to join the Caseys and the other eight teams in question for this season, the East Liverpool team ultimately withdrew operations before the season even began properly, with other failed locations that had submitted entries to start the ABL's inaugural season including Baltimore, Maryland (who eventually got their own team the following season); Milwaukee, Wisconsin; and two more locations in the state of Ohio via Columbus and Camden), though the ABL would compete in a split season format with two half seasons being utilized instead of one whole season being utilized throughout the season (which would be the case throughout the majority of the league's existence in the first place). However, by the time the first half of the season ended and the second half of the season began, the Boston Whirlwinds would be expelled from the ABL due to a dispute over player contracts, which led to the ABL entering the second half of the season with only eight teams remaining in their league this time around. In any case, the first season for the Caseys would ultimately be an average one in terms of team placement, though a generally below-average one for the team in terms of overall wins and losses throughout the season as a whole. During the first half of the season, the Caseys would end up having a below-average 7–9 record to have an average fifth-place finish to place themselves ahead of the soon-to-be-defunct Boston Whirlwinds, the Chicago Bruins, the Detroit Pulaski Post Five, and the Buffalo Bisons, but behind the Rochester Centrals, the Cleveland Rosenblums, the Washington Palace Five, and the first half champion Brooklyn Arcadians. As for the second half of the season, due to the removal to the Boston Whirlwinds in that particular half of the season, the Caseys' placement would still be the same as it was beforehand in the first half of the season, but it would be considered below-average for the overall league's placement during that half of the season since their below-average 6–8 record would be ahead of only the Buffalo Bisons, Chicago Bruins, and Detroit Pulaski Post Five this time around. Following the conclusion of the inaugural ABL season, the Caseys would decide to rebrand themselves into the Fort Wayne Hoosiers for the rest of their existence in the ABL going forward.

== Roster ==
Due to information on American Basketball League players being generally hard to find, there are bound to be more gaps and/or inaccuracies found in certain areas on the team's roster spots than usual.

Player	Position
Shang Chadwick	C
Blair Gullion	C
Bill McCleary	G/F
Biz Miller	F
Ralph Miller	G
Schnitz Schneider	G
Dutch Schultheiss	G/F
Harry Schwab	G/F
Frank Shimek	G
Homer Stonebraker	F
Johnny Whitty	G
Gus Yorkes	G

== American Basketball League Standings ==
First Half
Team	Wins	Losses	Winning %
Brooklyn Arcadians	12	4	.750
Washington Palace Five / Laundrymen	11	5	.688
Cleveland Rosenblums	10	6	.625
Rochester Centrals	9	7	.562
Fort Wayne Caseys	7	9	.438
Chicago Bruins	6	10	.375
Detroit Pulaski Post Five	6	10	.375
Boston Whirlwinds^{×}	6	10	.375
Buffalo Bisons / Germans	5	11	.322

× – The Boston Whirlwinds were expelled by the end of the first half of the season due to a dispute over player contracts.

Second Half
Team	Wins	Losses	Winning %
Cleveland Rosenblums	13	1	.919
Washington Palace Five / Laundrymen	11	3	.786
Rochester Centrals	9	5	.643
Brooklyn Arcadians	7	7	.500
Fort Wayne Caseys	6	8	.429
Buffalo Bisons / Germans	5	9	.357
Chicago Bruins	3	11	.214
Detroit Pulaski Post Five	2	12	.143
