= 1927–28 Cleveland Rosenblums season =

- League: American Basketball League (original)
- Head coach: Dave Kerr (player-coach)
- General manager: Max Rosenblum
- Owner(s): Max Rosenblum
- Arena: Public Hall Auditorium

Results
- Record: 22–29 (.431)
- Place: Division: 2nd (Western)
- Playoff finish: Lost Western Division Playoff to the Fort Wayne Hoosiers, 2–0

The 1927–28 Cleveland Rosenblums season was both the Rosenblums' third season of existence as a professional franchise (after previously playing by as early as 1919 in an independent basis under the Rosenblum Credits name and sometimes having their team name being shortened down to the Rosies) and the third season of existence for the American Basketball League, which was the first professional basketball league that had truly attempted to go fully national after previous professional basketball leagues were mostly regional at the time. For the first season ever in the league's history (and the only time in its inaugural period of existence), the ABL would abandon its split season formatting to have one whole regular season of play, with the eight teams there competing in two divisions of four teams each (with Cleveland competing in the Western Division, while teams such as the Original Celtics (labeled as the New York (Original) Celtics during this season) and the Philadelphia Warriors competed in the Eastern Division this season). While the Eastern Division was described as something more like a bloodbath to those that had witnessed the season at hand (to the point where the Washington Palace Five (/ Laundrymen) team would end up having their franchise rights be moved out and swapped around with the Brooklyn Visitations by what would unofficially be considered the start of the second half of the season on January 3, 1928 until the end of that franchise's existence (pretty much)), the Western Division was seen as more like a joke who’s two best teams were already decided by the halfway point of the season due to the Detroit Cardinals / Olympians folding operations on January 3, 1928 as well following a doubleheader series victory they had, as well as the Chicago Bruins holding the worst record of the surviving teams left in the Western Division throughout this season. Because of that fact, despite the struggles that the Rosenblums had throughout this season (to the point where this would reasonably be considered their worst season of play in terms of professional basketball seasons completed with them going 7–22 after starting out the season with a 15–7 record), the Cleveland squad owned by Max Rosenblum would still end up finishing with a second place spot in the Western Division behind the Fort Wayne Hoosiers, with the new regular season and playoff format that was held during this season giving the Rosenblums a fair chance to compete for the ABL championship once again for a third straight season. Unfortunately for the Rosenblums, their weaknesses as a team would be far too much to overcome as a whole this season, as they would end up being swept 2–0 by the Hoosiers in the Western Division Playoff. However, despite their failing status at the end of the season, the offseason period following this one amidst concerns revolving the now two-time defending ABL champion Original Celtics would cause great changes for the Rosenblums team that would result in greater ramifications for not just them, but also the ABL in the long-term as well.

== Roster ==
Due to information on American Basketball League players being generally hard to find, there are bound to be more gaps and/or inaccuracies found in certain areas on the team's roster spots than usual.

1927–28 Cleveland Rosenblums roster
Players

| Pos. | No. | Player | Height | Weight | DOB | From |
|---|---|---|---|---|---|---|
| G/F | | Buddy Bushman | 6 ft 1 in (1.85 m) | 170 lb (77 kg) | 1902-12-18 | No college |
| G/F | | Soup Campbell | 5 ft 9 in (1.75 m) | 160 lb (73 kg) | 1902-12-18 | No college |
| G/F | | Cookie Cunningham | 5 ft 11 in (1.80 m) | 160 lb (73 kg) | 1914-04-02 | Long Island |
| F | | Rich Deighan | 6 ft 2 in (1.88 m) | 185 lb (84 kg) | 1915-08-24 | NYU |
| C | | Eddie Dolin | 6 ft 2 in (1.88 m) | 185 lb (84 kg) | 1892-08-01 | Washington & Jefferson |
| G/F | | Vic Hanson | 5 ft 10 in (1.78 m) | 170 lb (77 kg) | 1903-07-30 | Syracuse |
| G/F | | Nat Hickey | 5 ft 11 in (1.80 m) | 190 lb (86 kg) | 1902-01-30 | Hoboken HS (NJ) |
| G/F | | Carl Husta | 5 ft 11 in (1.80 m) | 175 lb (79 kg) | 1902-04-08 | No college |
| G/F | | Dave Kerr | 6 ft 2 in (1.88 m) | 195 lb (88 kg) | 1896-02-03 | Central HS (PA) |
| G/F | | Whitey Littell | 5 ft 10 in (1.78 m) | 160 lb (73 kg) | 1904-04-12 | No college |
| G/F | | Pug Mahoney | 5 ft 11 in (1.80 m) | 180 lb (82 kg) | 1909-07-21 | No college |
| G | | Elmer Ripley | 5 ft 7 in (1.70 m) | 150 lb (68 kg) | 1891-07-21 | Brown |
| G/F | | Joey Sheehan | 5 ft 9 in (1.75 m) | | 1905-08-26 | Villanova |
| G/F | | Red Skurnick | 5 ft 10 in (1.78 m) | | 1904-04-15 | Savage School of Physical Education |

Coaches
Head coach

Dave Kerr

Legend
- (DP) Unsigned draft pick
- (FA) Free agent
- (S) Suspended
- Injured

Note: Soup Campbell, Eddie Dolin, Vic Hanson, Whitey Littell, Pug Mahoney, and Joey Sheehan would not be a part of the team's playoff roster for this season.

== American Basketball League Standings ==
=== Eastern Division ===
Eastern Division
| Team | Wins | Losses | Winning % |
|---|---|---|---|
| New York (Original) Celtics | 40 | 9 | .816 |
| Philadelphia Warriors | 30 | 21 | .588 |
| Washington Palace Five (/ Laundrymen) / Brooklyn Visitations* | 25 | 26 | .490 |
| Rochester Centrals | 24 | 28 | .462 |

* – The Washington Palace Five / Laundrymen franchise would have their franchise rights and record be transferred out to the Brooklyn Visitations by January 3, 1928 for the unofficial second half of the season.

=== Western Division ===
Western Division
| Team | Wins | Losses | Winning % |
|---|---|---|---|
| Fort Wayne Hoosiers | 27 | 24 | .529 |
| Cleveland Rosenblums | 22 | 29 | .431 |
| Chicago Bruins | 13 | 36 | .265 |
| Detroit Cardinals / Olympians† | 5 | 13 | .278 |

† – Withdrew from the ABL on January 3, 1928 by the start of the unofficial second half of the season.

== ABL Playoffs ==
For the first time in the ABL's history (and the only time during their initial run when attempting to be a national league instead of a regional league), the ABL would utilize a regular playoff format of sorts where the two best teams of each division would go up against each other before the winning team from each division would go up against each other in the championship series.

=== ABL Western Division Playoff ===
(2W) Cleveland Rosenblums Vs. (1W) Fort Wayne Hoosiers: Fort Wayne Hoosiers win series 2–0

- Game 1: March 14, 1928 @ Cleveland: Fort Wayne Hoosiers 22, Cleveland Rosenblums 15
- Game 2: March 16, 1928 @ Fort Wayne: Fort Wayne Hoosiers 31, Cleveland Rosenblums 25
