= 1926–27 Brooklyn Arcadians season =

- League: American Basketball League (original)
- Head coach: Garry Schmeelk (player-coach)
- General manager: Garry Schmeelk
- Arena: Arcadia Hall

Results
- Record: 0–5 (.000)
- Place: Conference: N/A (8th/9th in 1st half unofficially)
- Playoff finish: Officially folded operations on December 3, 1926. (The Original Celtics franchise took over the spot for them for the rest of the season (albeit as the Brooklyn Celtics, meaning they technically operated as the Brooklyn Arcadians / Celtics for at least the first half of the season).)

The 1926–27 Brooklyn Arcadians season was the second and final professional basketball season of play for the Brooklyn Arcadians team (who sometimes were also referred to as the Brooklyn Rockets) in the city of Brooklyn, New York under the original version of the American Basketball League, which was the first professional basketball league that had truly attempted to go fully national after previous professional basketball leagues were mostly regional at the time. For the second straight season in a row, the American Basketball League would start out their season with nine teams competing in the split season formatting, with the two half seasons being utilized instead of one whole season being utilized throughout the entire season (which would be the case throughout the majority of the league's existence in the first place). However, unlike the previous season of play, when the ABL was looking to prove its status as a truly national professional basketball league can be successful for the sport as a whole, this season would see some unintended sabotage occurring within the offseason due to the creation of another rivaling professional basketball league named the National Basketball League (which wouldn't be related to the National Basketball League that would eventually be considered a predecessor to the present day National Basketball Association, but instead were essentially a rebranded version of the technically rivaling Metropolitan Basketball League that the Original Celtics franchise had intended to join at first before declining due to how few games and how tiny the venues they had to play in were this time around), which would end up stealing away talented players from all three of the Brooklyn Arcadians, the Detroit Pulaski Post Five (who might have renamed themselves to just being the Detroit Lions basketball team during the early points of the season), and the Washington Palace Five / Laundrymen franchises. Worse yet for the Arcadians, George Preston Marshall would end up taking players away from both the Brooklyn and Detroit squads in order to try and replenish his team to be as talented as they could be for the upcoming ABL season, which left both the Arcadians and the Pulaski Post Five / Lions teams with stripped bare rosters to start out the season. That awful combination of luck would lead to all three of the Brooklyn Arcadians, the Detroit Pulaski Post Five / Lions, and the newly added Baltimore Orioles basketball team with winless squads to start out the season, which forced the ABL to go into strongman mode to help revitalize the league back to what it was going to be before the surprise takeover by the ("original") NBL began; to do that, the 0–5 Arcadians would end up joining the 0–6 Detroit squad as the only two ABL teams to effectively withdraw their operations from the league entirely, though the Brooklyn Arcadians would at least see some sort of consolation occur with the Original Celtics (who had originally planned on entering the ABL at the time alongside the Baltimore Orioles and the Philadelphia Quakers / Phillies that later became the Philadelphia Sphas operating as the Philadelphia Warriors before the Celtics ultimately defected from it into the rivaling NBL since the Celtics were more reluctant to join the ABL at the time) taking on the spot the Arcadians had in the league for the rest of the season going forward (although the Celtics would inherit the disadvantageous record the Arcadians had for just the first half of the season) as opposed to having their records be stricken away completely from the league's history like the Detroit franchise had to deal with on their ends. Not only that, but the Arcadians could technically be seen as pseudo champions of the ABL for the second season as well due to the Original Celtics (playing under the Brooklyn Celtics name while in the ABL for just this season only, technically speaking) eventually claiming the 1927 ABL championship over the inaugural ABL champion Cleveland Rosenblums, though it wouldn't really count as a championship for the Arcadians franchise in this case due to their entire team effectively being replaced by the future Naismith Basketball Hall of Fame team that took over for them, especially since the Celtics would only win the second half of the season before getting the ABL championship and not the first half of the season.

== Roster ==
Due to information on American Basketball League players being generally hard to find, there are bound to be more gaps and/or inaccuracies found in certain areas on the team's roster spots than usual. However, since this article was focusing only on the team that was originally the Brooklyn Arcadians (sometimes referred to as the Brooklyn Rockets) and not the team that ended up replacing them later on in the season in the Original Celtics (which were referred to as the Brooklyn Celtics in this case), this roster would only be listing out the team that the Brooklyn Arcadians had at the time before they ended up being forcefully dropped and later replaced by the Original Celtics team that became the Brooklyn Celtics later this season.

Player	Position
Buddy Bushman	G
Walter Jamieson	G
Willie McDonald	F
Willie McWalters	F
Gary Schmeelk	F
Dick Smyth	F
Joe Wallace	C

== American Basketball League Standings ==
First Half
Team	Wins	Losses	Winning %
Cleveland Rosenblums	17	4	.810
Washington Palace Five / Laundrymen	16	5	.762
Philadelphia Quakers / Phillies*	14	7	.667
Brooklyn Arcadians/Brooklyn Celtics**	13	8	.619
Fort Wayne Hoosiers	8	13	.381
Rochester Centrals	8	13	.381
Chicago Bruins	7	14	.333
Baltimore Orioles	1	20	.048
Brooklyn Arcadians**‡	0	5	.000
Detroit Pulaski Post Five / Pulaski / Lions†	0	6	.000

* – The Philadelphia Sphas would replace the Philadelphia Quakers during the second half of the season, albeit while playing under the original Philadelphia Warriors name instead of their typical Philadelphia SPHAs name.
** – After playing only in five total games this season (all of which ended in defeats), the Brooklyn Arcadians would have their franchise rights be both transferred and replaced by the Original Celtics franchise under the temporarily implemented name of the Brooklyn Celtics for the rest of this season in the ABL.
‡ – Withdrew from the ABL after playing only five total games during the first half of this season on December 3, 1926, with their position later being taken over by the Original Celtics franchise under the Brooklyn Celtics name for the first half of the season.
† – Withdrew from the ABL after playing only six total games during the first half of this season, with their games being stricken from the official league record books during this season.

Second Half
Team	Wins	Losses	Winning %
Brooklyn Celtics*	19	2	.905
Fort Wayne Hoosiers	15	6	.714
Washington Palace Five / Laundrymen	14	7	.667
Philadelphia Warriors**	10	11	.476
Cleveland Rosenblums	9	12	.429
Chicago Bruins	6	15	.286
Rochester Centrals	6	15	.286
Baltimore Orioles	5	16	.238

* – After playing only five total games this season (all of which ended in defeats), the Brooklyn Arcadians would have their franchise rights be both transferred and replaced by the Original Celtics franchise under the temporarily implemented name of the Brooklyn Celtics for the rest of this season in the ABL.
** – The Philadelphia Sphas would replace the Philadelphia Quakers during the second half of the season, albeit while playing under the original Philadelphia Warriors name instead of their typical Philadelphia SPHAs name.
