= 1929–30 Cleveland Rosenblums season =

- League champions
- League: American Basketball League (original)
- Head coach: Dave Kerr (player-coach)
- General manager: Max Rosenblum
- Owner(s): Max Rosenblum
- Arena: Public Hall Auditorium

Results
- Record: 35–19 (.648)
- Place: Conference: 1st (1st half); 2nd (2nd half)
- Playoff finish: ABL Champions (Won 4–1 over Rochester Centrals)

The 1929–30 Cleveland Rosenblums season was both the Rosenblums' fifth season of existence (as well as their final full season of play) as a professional franchise (after previously playing by as early as 1919 in an independent basis under the Rosenblum Credits name and sometimes having their team name being shortened down to the Rosies) and the fifth season of existence for the American Basketball League, which was the first professional basketball league that had truly attempted to go fully national after previous professional basketball leagues were mostly regional at the time. For the fourth time in five seasons, the American Basketball League would utilize the split season formatting, though similar to the previous ABL season, the American Basketball League would have eight teams competing within the two half seasons that were being utilized here instead of the one whole season that was being was the season before that one. However, unlike that previous season, this season would see not just one, but two different teams drop out of the ABL entirely, with the New York (Original) Celtics basically being a shell of their former selves by this point in time and later having their average 5–5 record be stricken from the record books by the end of the season after dropping out of the league by December 19, 1929, while the Syracuse All-Americans fared even worse than them by comparison, to the point where they ended up forfeiting their final four games scheduled in the first half of the season after officially dropping out of the season themselves on January 6, 1930. During the first half of the season, the Rosenblums would continue showcasing why they were the top team in the ABL when they finished that half of the season with an above-average 17–7 record for a first place finish there, being two games ahead of the Brooklyn Visitations and three games ahead of the Rochester Centrals. Because of that fact, Cleveland would once again have a chance to automatically claim the league's championship by default by winning the second half of the season outright, though they would be denied that right due to them by being one game behind the surging Rochester Centrals for first place, meaning the above-average 18–12 record for the second half of the season that was one game ahead of the just as surprisingly surging Chicago Bruins would only be good for second place instead. Despite that fact, the Rosenblums would still have a chance at repeating as champions in the ABL (and winning three out of five ABL championships) due to their first half champion status, with the Rosenblums and second half champion Centrals competing in a best-of-seven championship series. While Rochester would upset Cleveland in the first game of the series, the Rosenblums would end up taking control of the rest of the series not long afterward to win the series 4–1 under five straight days of play to win their second straight ABL championship and third championship in five seasons, further showcasing the combination of Carl Husta (and George Glasco) and former Original Celtics players for their starting line-up provided one of the best starting line-ups in professional basketball history at the time, with Cookie Cunningham being a capable back-up center in the process alongside Red Skurnick being a worthwhile back-up guard/forward for the team as well. However, the hubris of Max Rosenblum's team would later lead to its greatest downfall by the time the (original iteration of the) ABL entered its (supposed) final season of play with upcoming rule changes coming into play to help curb their own power there.

== Roster ==
Due to information on American Basketball League players being generally hard to find, there are bound to be more gaps and/or inaccuracies found in certain areas on the team's roster spots than usual.

1929–30 Cleveland Rosenblums roster
Players

Pos.	No.	Player	Height	Weight	DOB	From
C		Cliff Anderson	6 ft 4 in (1.93 m)	175 lb (79 kg)	1903-03-02	CCNY
G/F		Pete Barry	5 ft 11 in (1.80 m)	170 lb (77 kg)	1896-11-16	No college
F/C		Cookie Cunningham	6 ft 3 in (1.91 m)	210 lb (95 kg)	1905-02-04	Ohio State
G/F		Dutch Dehnert	6 ft 0 in (1.83 m)	185 lb (84 kg)	1898-04-05	No college
G/F		Ray Dickerson	6 ft 0 in (1.83 m)	165 lb (75 kg)	1908-06-15	Northeastern State
G/F		George Glasco	5 ft 10 in (1.78 m)	150 lb (68 kg)	1901-04-07	No college
G/F		Carl Husta	5 ft 11 in (1.80 m)	175 lb (79 kg)	1902-04-08	No college
G/F		Dink Irwin	6 ft 3 in (1.91 m)	200 lb (91 kg)	1906-06-01	Temple
G/F		Dave Kerr	6 ft 2 in (1.88 m)	195 lb (88 kg)	1896-02-03	Central HS (PA)
C		Joe Lapchick	6 ft 5 in (1.96 m)	185 lb (84 kg)	1900-04-12	No college
G/F		Scotty McDougal	5 ft 7 in (1.70 m)	160 lb (73 kg)	1906-08-18	No college
G/F		Red Skurnick	5 ft 10 in (1.78 m)		1904-04-15	Savage School of Physical Education

Coaches
Head coach

Dave Kerr

Legend
- (DP) Unsigned draft pick
- (FA) Free agent
- (S) Suspended
- Injured

Note: Cliff Anderson, Ray Dickerson, Dink Irwin, player-coach Dave Kerr, and Scotty McDougal would all not be a part of the team's (playing) roster by the time they entered the ABL championship series.

== American Basketball League Standings ==
First Half
Team	Wins	Losses	Winning %
Cleveland Rosenblums	17	7	.738
Brooklyn Visitations	15	9	.625
Rochester Centrals	14	10	.583
Chicago Bruins	12	12	.500
Fort Wayne Hoosiers	12	12	.500
Paterson Crescents	10	14	.417
New York (Original) Celtics†*	5	5	.500
Syracuse All-Americans†	4	20	.167

† – Withdrew from the ABL before the first half of the season officially ended, with the New York (Original) Celtics dropping out of the league on December 19, 1929 and the Syracuse All-Americans dropping out of the ABL (and forfeiting their final four games of the first half of the season by default) on January 6, 1930 near the end of the first half of the season.
* – Withdrew from the ABL after playing only ten total games during the first half of this season, with their games being stricken from the official league record books during this season despite having an average record this season.

Second Half
Team	Wins	Losses	Winning %
Rochester Centrals	19	11	.633
Cleveland Rosenblums	18	12	.600
Chicago Bruins	17	13	.567
Brooklyn Visitations	15	15	.500
Fort Wayne Hoosiers	13	17	.433
Paterson Crescents	8	22	.267

== American Basketball League Championship Series ==
Cleveland Rosenblums (1st Half Champions) Vs. Rochester Centrals (2nd Half Champions): Cleveland Rosenblums win series 4–1

- Game 1: March 20, 1930 @ Rochester: Rochester Centrals 20, Cleveland Rosenblums 16
- Game 2: March 21, 1930 @ Cleveland: Cleveland Rosenblums 18, Rochester Centrals 17
- Game 3: March 22, 1930 @ Rochester: Cleveland Rosenblums 18, Rochester Centrals 13
- Game 4: March 23, 1930 @ Cleveland: Cleveland Rosenblums 23, Rochester Centrals 16
- Game 5: March 24, 1930 @ Cleveland: Cleveland Rosenblums 21, Rochester Centrals 15
