= 1930–31 Cleveland Rosenblums season =

- League: American Basketball League (original)
- Head coach: Joe Lapchick (player-coach)
- General manager: Max Rosenblum; Nig Rose
- Owner(s): Max Rosenblum
- Arena: Public Hall Auditorium

Results
- Record: 6–6 (.500)
- Place: Conference: N/A (6th/7th (1st half))
- Playoff finish: Did not qualify (Dropped out of the ABL on December 8, 1930.)

The 1930–31 Cleveland Rosenblums season was both the Rosenblums' sixth and final season of existence as a professional franchise (after previously playing by as early as 1919 in an independent basis under the Rosenblum Credits name and sometimes having their team name being shortened down to the Rosies) and the sixth and final season of existence for the original American Basketball League, which was the first professional basketball league that had truly attempted to go fully national after previous professional basketball leagues were mostly regional at the time.

== History ==
For the fifth and final time in the six original seasons that the ABL first had within that original era of existence, the American Basketball League would utilize the split season formatting, though unlike their other seasons of existence, they would only see seven teams competing in the two half seasons being utilized this time around instead of eight or nine teams with one whole season being utilized throughout that entire period of time (which would be the case throughout the majority of the league's existence in the first place). Moreover, the Rosenblums would see cuts in player salaries (such as John Beckman receiving only $1,000 per month via $500 payments on the 1st and 15th of each month for four months of play instead of receiving $1,500 per month (likely via $750 payments on the 1st and 15th of each month for four months of play), although Beckman would decide to retire instead due to constant injury problems on his end.)

New rules would be utilized throughout this season, such as having teams utilize two rookies being on their team, with one of them being able to play on the court at all times. Those disadvantages combined with a planned "2.5 second rule" (better known now as the three second lane violation) for an offensive player's presence in the center lane. This contributed to Max Rosenblum surprisingly and suddenly withdrawing his team from the ABL on December 8, 1930 after holding an average 6–6 record for the first half of the season due to him feeling like the league had no right on handicapping his own team's play, with the planned rule in particular feeling like they'd handicap Dutch Dehnert's own success in particular out in the ABL since he started the pivot play there. Thus, the Rosenblums' plans for a three-peat in the ABL (and four ABL championships in six years) would ultimately end in a premature manner, with Cleveland later being joined by the Paterson Crescents in December 1930 as the second team to withdraw operations. As with the Rosenblums, the Crescents terminated operations with a .500 record (9–9) before the first half of the season concluded.

By the end of the season, the ABL would ultimately see the long-term effects of the Great Depression come into play for the rest of the league (despite initially planning to have their 1931–32 hold 16 teams competing in an Eastern and Western Division for that season), as they had no choice but to shut down league operations for the next two seasons afterward, with them only continuing onward under a smaller, more regional basis instead by the 1933–34 season with mostly new teams competing going forward there (though that version of the ABL would still be connected with this version of the ABL). While the Cleveland Rosenblums would never play (at least not as a professional franchise) ever again following this season's conclusion, Max Rosenblum would still be a local presence within the basketball world throughout the 1930s and 1940s by not only reviving the Original Celtics franchise under the Rosenblum Celtics name for a few seasons (though that revival would help cause a more chronologically confusing history for the franchise than it already would be for them), but also by hosting a professional basketball tournament in the city of Cleveland that was originally called the Max Rosenblum Tournament before later events called it the Cleveland Pro Basketball Tournament.

== Roster ==
Due to information on American Basketball League players being generally hard to find, there are bound to be more gaps and/or inaccuracies found in certain areas on the team's roster spots than usual.

1930–31 Cleveland Rosenblums roster
Players

Pos.	No.	Player	Height	Weight	DOB	From
G/F		Pete Barry	5 ft 11 in (1.80 m)	170 lb (77 kg)	1896-11-16	No college
G/F		Dutch Dehnert	6 ft 0 in (1.83 m)	185 lb (84 kg)	1898-04-05	No college
F		Don Dutton	5 ft 11 in (1.80 m)	165 lb (75 kg)	1908-09-26	Georgetown
F		Al Eckert	5 ft 10 in (1.78 m)	175 lb (79 kg)	1906-05-17	Findlay
G/F		Carl Husta	5 ft 11 in (1.80 m)	175 lb (79 kg)	1902-04-08	No college
C		Joe Lapchick	6 ft 5 in (1.96 m)	185 lb (84 kg)	1900-04-12	No college
F		Dutch Shudtz	6 ft 0 in (1.83 m)	175 lb (79 kg)	1908-06-07	No college
F		Lou Spindell	5 ft 10 in (1.78 m)	175 lb (79 kg)	1908-12-16	CCNY

Coaches
Head coach

Joe Lapchick

Legend
- (DP) Unsigned draft pick
- (FA) Free agent
- (S) Suspended
- Injured

== American Basketball League Standings ==
First Half
Team	Wins	Losses	Winning %
Brooklyn Visitations	14	7	.667
Fort Wayne Hoosiers	13	9	.591
Rochester Centrals	10	9	.526
Toledo Red Man Tobaccos	8	13	.381
Chicago Bruins	7	14	.333
Cleveland Rosenblums*	6	6	.500
Paterson Crescents**	9	9	.500

* – The two-time defending ABL champions (and three-time overall ABL champions) in the Cleveland Rosenblums would surprisingly end up dropping out of the league on December 8, 1930 due to the long-term effects of the Great Depression kicking in for them.
** – The (original) Paterson Crescents franchise would end up dropping out of the league near the end of the first half of the season on December 30, 1930.

Second Half
Team	Wins	Losses	Winning %
Fort Wayne Hoosiers	11	5	.688
Chicago Bruins	11	5	.688
Brooklyn Visitations	8	8	.500
Rochester Centrals	5	10	.333
Toledo Red Man Tobaccos	4	11	.274
