= 1925–26 Brooklyn Arcadians season =

- League: American Basketball League (original)
- Head coach: Garry Schmeelk (player-coach)
- General manager: Garry Schmeelk
- Arena: Arcadia Hall

Results
- Record: 19–11 (.633)
- Place: Conference: 1st (1st half); 4th (2nd half)
- Playoff finish: Lost ABL championship series 0–3 to Cleveland Rosenblums

The 1925–26 Brooklyn Arcadians season was the first and only full professional basketball season of play for the Brooklyn Arcadians team (who sometimes were also referred to as the Brooklyn Rockets) in the city of Brooklyn, New York under the original version of the American Basketball League, which was the first professional basketball league that had truly attempted to go fully national after previous professional basketball leagues were mostly regional at the time. The American Basketball League's inaugural season would have nine teams competing in that season (while a tenth team in East Liverpool, Ohio was intended to join the Arcadians and the other eight teams in question for this season, the East Liverpool team ultimately withdrew operations before the season even began properly, with other failed locations that had submitted entries to start the ABL's inaugural season including Baltimore, Maryland (who eventually got their own team the following season); Milwaukee, Wisconsin; and two more locations in the state of Ohio via Columbus and Camden), though the ABL would compete in a split season format with two half seasons being utilized instead of one whole season being utilized throughout the season (which would be the case throughout the majority of the league's existence in the first place). However, by the time the first half of the season ended and the second half of the season began, the Boston Whirlwinds would officially be expelled from the ABL on February 11, 1926 due to a dispute over player contracts (though some sources claim they withdrew from the ABL instead due to poor attendance numbers for their home games), which led to the ABL entering the second half of the season with only eight teams remaining in their league this time around. In any case, the first season for the Arcadians within the ABL would prove to be a very good one for the team, as the work done by player-coach Garry Schmeelk combined with the good player signings done in part by future Baseball Hall of Famer (and current (at the time) Detroit Tigers right fielder) Harry Heilmann (including the signings of players from the technically rivaling Metropolitan Basketball League's two-time champions in the nearby Brooklyn Visitations and former Original Celtics center George "Horse" Haggerty) would lead to the Arcadians surprising the rest of the newly-created league by finishing the first half of the season with a 12–4 record, being one game ahead of the Washington Palace Five / Laundrymen and two games ahead of the Cleveland Rosenblums for first place in that particular half of the ABL. Unfortunately for the Arcadians, they would end up struggling a fair bit more than they had expected they would have by the time the second half of the season began properly for them, as the Brooklyn squad would end up going through some larger than expected struggles throughout the second half of the season, which led to them finishing that half of the season with an average 7–7 record that placed them behind the Rochester Centrals, the Washington Palace Five squad, and the nearly undefeated Cleveland Rosenblums (who had obviously become the champions of the second half of the season by that point) to get an overall 19–11 record for the season as the Arcadians and Rosenblums competed against each other in an inaugural best-of-five championship series in lieu of a proper playoff format due to the split season motif. The poor performances of the Arcadians would end up continuing throughout the championship series, as they would end up being swept 3–0 by the Cleveland Rosenblums (which would be somewhat related to them being without former Original Celtics center George "Horse" Haggerty by this point in time), failing to be named the inaugural league champions for the season (though the championship series gave the people within the league optimism for its growth at the time due to the average attendance for the games played in Cleveland during that series in particular averaging around 10,000 fans at a time when fan turnaround wasn't even considered to go so high at the time). Worse yet, despite entering the following season with high expectations in mind, this season would later end up becoming the only full professional season ever played by the Arcadians franchise, as an unexpected takeover from a soon-to-be-created rivaling basketball league that looked to take away from the ABL's spotlight would end up doing far greater damage to the Arcadians once the second ABL season began than the Brooklyn squad would have ever expected once they had entered the offseason period.

== Roster ==
Due to information on American Basketball League players being generally hard to find, there are bound to be more gaps and/or inaccuracies found in certain areas on the team's roster spots than usual.

Player	Position
Buddy Bushman	G/F
Red Conaty	G/F
Rody Cooney	G
George Glasco	G/F
George "Horse" Haggerty	C
Waite Hoyt	F
Tubby Raskin	G/F
Elmer Ripley	G
Rusty Saunders	F
Gary Schmeelk	G/F
Tillie Voss	C
Joe Wallace	C

Note: George Glasco, George "Horse" Haggerty, Waite Hoyt, Tubby Raskin, and Rusty Saunders would not be a part of the Arcadians' roster during the inaugural ABL championship series for one reason or another.

== American Basketball League Standings ==
First Half
Team	Wins	Losses	Winning %
Brooklyn Arcadians	12	4	.750
Washington Palace Five / Laundrymen	11	5	.688
Cleveland Rosenblums	10	6	.625
Rochester Centrals	9	7	.562
Fort Wayne Caseys	7	9	.438
Chicago Bruins	6	10	.375
Detroit Pulaski Post Five	6	10	.375
Boston Whirlwinds^{×}	6	10	.375
Buffalo Bisons / Germans	5	11	.322

× – The Boston Whirlwinds were expelled by the end of the first half of the season due to a dispute over player contracts.

Second Half
Team	Wins	Losses	Winning %
Cleveland Rosenblums	13	1	.919
Washington Palace Five / Laundrymen	11	3	.786
Rochester Centrals	9	5	.643
Brooklyn Arcadians	7	7	.500
Fort Wayne Caseys	6	8	.429
Buffalo Bisons / Germans	5	9	.357
Chicago Bruins	3	11	.214
Detroit Pulaski Post Five	2	12	.143

== ABL Championship Series ==
Brooklyn Arcadians (1st Half Champions) Vs. Cleveland Rosenblums (2nd Half Champions): Cleveland Rosenblums win series 3–0

- Game 1: April 7, 1926 @ Cleveland: Cleveland Rosenblums 36, Brooklyn Arcadians 33
- Game 2: April 8, 1926 @ Cleveland: Cleveland Rosenblums 37, Brooklyn Arcadians 21
- Game 3: April 9, 1926 @ Manhattan: Cleveland Rosenblums 23, Brooklyn Arcadians 22

A more detailed analysis of the inaugural 1926 ABL championship series of games played can be found on APBR.org.

== Awards and honors ==
By the end of the season, Rusty Saunders would end up being the leading scorer of the entire league in its inaugural season with 238 points scored for an average of 7.0 points per game.
