= 1929–30 Fort Wayne Hoosiers season =

- League: American Basketball League (original)
- Head coach: Lou Sugarman (7–5); Clarence Alter (18–24)
- General manager: Ralph Miller
- Owner(s): C. L. Alter
- Arena: Fort Wayne Auditorium

Results
- Record: 25–29 (.463)
- Place: Conference: T–4th (1st half); 5th (2nd half)
- Playoff finish: Did not qualify

The 1929–30 Fort Wayne Hoosiers season was both the Hoosiers' fifth season of existence as a professional franchise (albeit after previously playing their first professional season under the Fort Wayne Caseys name, though the Hoosiers were also sometimes referred to as the Guards instead) in the city of Fort Wayne, Indiana and the fifth season of existence for the American Basketball League, which was the first professional basketball league that had truly attempted to go fully national after previous professional basketball leagues were mostly regional at the time. For the fourth time in five seasons, the American Basketball League would utilize the split season formatting, though similar to the previous ABL season, the American Basketball League would have eight teams competing within the two half seasons that were being utilized here instead of the one whole season that was being was the season before that one. However, unlike that previous season, this season would see not just one, but two different teams drop out of the ABL entirely, with the New York (Original) Celtics basically being a shell of their former selves by this point in time and later having their average 5–5 record be stricken from the record books by the end of the season after dropping out of the league by December 19, 1929, while the Syracuse All-Americans fared even worse than them by comparison, to the point where they ended up forfeiting their final four games scheduled in the first half of the season after officially dropping out of the season themselves on January 6, 1930. During the first half of the season, the Hoosiers would see some serious problems come into play, as instead of them continuing to try and compete as one of the best teams in the league, Fort Wayne would surprisingly see themselves as nothing more than an average squad as they tied the Chicago Bruins for an average 12–12 record (being two games ahead of the Paterson Crescents) for a fourth-place finish behind that of the Rochester Centrals, the Brooklyn Visitations, and the defending ABL champion Cleveland Rosenblums. Unfortunately for Fort Wayne, their woes from the first half of the season would not only continue onward, but also worsen up into the second half of the season instead. In that half, the Hoosiers would be one of only two teams with a losing record in that part of the season, as their below-average 13–17 record would see them finish ahead of only the Paterson Crescents once again for a fifth-place finish this season, easily failing to qualify for the ABL championship series in what would be seen as a very disappointing season for them.

== Roster ==
Due to information on American Basketball League players being generally hard to find, there are bound to be more gaps and/or inaccuracies found in certain areas on the team's roster spots than usual.

Player	Position
Davey Banks	F
John Beckman	F
Bennie Borgmann	G/F
Shang Chadwick	C
George Glasco	G/F
Hank Kowalczyk	F/C
Branch McCracken	G/F
Ralph Miller	G
Ward Myers	G/F
Rusty Saunders	F/C
Frank Shimek	G
Lefty Topel	G
Whitey Wickhorst	F

Note: In addition to all of these players, there was also an unknown player with the last name of Williser who was very briefly on the team that scored two points in a match for Fort Wayne as well.

== American Basketball League Standings ==
First Half
Team	Wins	Losses	Winning %
Cleveland Rosenblums	17	7	.738
Brooklyn Visitations	15	9	.625
Rochester Centrals	14	10	.583
Fort Wayne Hoosiers	12	12	.500
Chicago Bruins	12	12	.500
Paterson Crescents	10	14	.417
New York (Original) Celtics†*	5	5	.500
Syracuse All-Americans†	4	20	.167

† – Withdrew from the ABL before the first half of the season officially ended, with the New York (Original) Celtics dropping out of the league on December 19, 1929, and the Syracuse All-Americans dropping out of the ABL (and forfeiting their final four games of the first half of the season by default) on January 6, 1930, near the end of the first half of the season.
* – Withdrew from the ABL after playing only ten total games during the first half of this season, with their games being stricken from the official league record books during this season despite having an average record this season.

Second Half
Team	Wins	Losses	Winning %
Rochester Centrals	19	11	.633
Cleveland Rosenblums	18	12	.600
Chicago Bruins	17	13	.567
Brooklyn Visitations	15	15	.500
Fort Wayne Hoosiers	13	17	.433
Paterson Crescents	8	22	.267

== Awards and honors ==
By the end of the season, Bennie Borgmann would end up being the leading scorer of the entire league for the second straight season in a row in its fifth season of existence with 416 points scored for an average of 8.3 points per game. Borgmann would be the second player in the league's short history to have multiple seasons where he'd end up being the leading scorer within the (original) ABL's history, joining Rusty Saunders as the only other player to achieve that feat early on in that league's (currently short) history. Not only that, but Borgmann would also end up getting inducted into the Naismith Basketball Hall of Fame in 1961; as of 2026, no other leading scorer in the ABL's original history would join him, with Bobby McDermott in the league's revived history years later joining him as the only other leading scorer in league history to enter the Hall of Fame alongside him.
