= Pittsburgh Morrys =

- Nickname: "The Second Story Morrys" "The Morry Five" "The Morry Big Five"
- Founded: 1920

The Pittsburgh Morrys were a professional American basketball team in Pittsburgh, Pennsylvania. The Morrys were cited by the Pittsburgh Sun-Telegraph as one of the greatest quintets in the eastern United States.

== History ==
The team was founded in 1920. The team was sponsored by Morry Goldman, who was a Pittsburgh haberdasher. The team was nicknamed the "Second-Story Morrys" due to Goldman's store being on the second floor. The Morrys were often known as "The Morry Five" and "The Morry Big Five". They were said to be from Braddock, Pennsylvania early on.

The Morrys picked up wins in the 1920–21 season over Gallagher. and were beaten by the Coffey Club for the title in the 1921 Independent Basketball Championship of Allegheny County.

The Morrys began preparations for the 1921–22 season in November 1921. Bill Campbell, Dave Mervis, Mickey Gross, Fidler, John Pearson, Lew Mervis, Joe Goldman and Jack Goldman were selected for the team. The Morrys met the Coffey Club again in the title game of the 1921–22 season and the Coffey Club were victorious again.

The Morrys were title contenders again in the 1922–23 season. They signed Moon Klinzing and were able to defeat the Coffey Club twice to win the 1923 Independent Basketball Championship of Allegheny County.

The Morrys lost the Pittsburgh Independent Title to the Coffey Club in the 1923–24 season.

The Morrys won the 1924–25 Western Pennsylvania Championship and were champions again in 1925–26.

The Morrys had a strong 1927 season, winning 26 straight games, which was a local record. They went 52–7 and 36 of the games were Central League games with the others being exhibition games. Five of the losses that season were under 5 points. The Morrys won the Central League title in 1926–27.

The Morrys players were signed to the McKeesport Cyclers during the 1928 season in the Allegheny County League. They defeated the Cleveland Rosenblums, the Seneca Indians and the Fort Wayne Knights, which earned them a shot at the New York Celtics for the league title.

Fred J. Miller and Meyer Goldenson were trying to put games together for former Morrys players in October 1928. The Morrys were reunited in 1929 with former players making up some of the squad.

Morry Goldman later opened a new clothing store called "Fintex Clothes" which sponsored a Pittsburgh Fintex/Morry's Fintex team which featured Morry Five players.

There was also a Pittsburgh Morrys soccer team.
