= 1932–33 Fort Wayne Chiefs season =

- League: National Professional Basketball League
- Head coach: Ralph Miller (player-coach)
- General manager: Ralph Miller(?)
- Owner(s): C. L. Alter(?); Ralph Miller (?)
- Arena: Fort Wayne Auditorium

Results
- Record: 4–9 (.308)
- Place: Conference: 5th
- Playoff finish: Did not qualify

The 1932–33 Fort Wayne Chiefs season is the only professional basketball season of play for the Chiefs franchise in the city of Fort Wayne, Indiana under what was considered the only official season of the National Professional Basketball League, a league which would end up becoming a precursor to both the Midwest Basketball Conference and the National Basketball League (with the latter league eventually merging operations with the Basketball Association of America to become the present-day National Basketball Association). However, it is also suggested that the Fort Wayne Chiefs are actually the old Fort Wayne Hoosiers American Basketball League franchise competing under a new team name in the Chiefs; if that part is true, this would mark the team's seventh and final professional basketball season of play instead, as the team would previously compete in the ABL as both the Fort Wayne Caseys in the ABL's inaugural season and then the Hoosiers for the rest of that league's existence before somehow becoming the Chiefs for this recent season. In any case, the Fort Wayne Chiefs squad entered the season as a part of a new nine team league that also featured two works teams in the Akron Firestone Non-Skids and the Akron Goodyear Wingfoots, a (potentially) fellow ABL team from its final (original) season of existence in the Toledo Crimson Coaches Tobaccos, and a rising newcomer franchise in the Indianapolis Kautskys that would be owned by farmer turned grocer Frank Kautsky as some of the other teams that would be competing in this league. (Interestingly, the Chiefs were planned to compete in a league that was initially a final attempt for creating the NPBL which had representatives in their local Fort Wayne, Indiana area within their Anthony Wayne Hotel being joined by representatives in Chicago, Illinois and other Ohio locations in Akron, Canton, Cleveland, Dayton, and Toledo meeting at the time for an eight-team league before eventually deciding to be a combined Indiana-Ohio nine-team league there.) Unfortunately for the rest of the league, four of the teams created would end up folding operations throughout the season for one reason or another, with the Akron Goodyear Wingfoots playing in only six games this year. When it came to the Fort Wayne team, they would end up finishing with a below-average 4–9 record, which resulted in them technically finishing in last place in terms of surviving teams (fifth place overall) with a .308 win percentage, with their win percentage being worse than one of the teams that folded operations altogether in the Kokomo Kelts. This would easily lead to them failing to qualify for the NPBL's playoffs, which would essentially be a championship series between the two best teams of the league that season, which were the nearly-undefeated Akron Firestone Non-Skids and the Toledo Crimson Coaches Tobaccos. After a few years of independent play, team owner and head coach Frank Kautsky alongside Akron Firestone Non-Skids head coach Paul Sheeks would help create the Midwest Basketball Conference with mostly new teams being added to help succeed the original version of the NPBL that both Indianapolis and Akron had played under, with neither Kautsky nor Sheeks calling up the Fort Wayne squad to be one of the teams that previously were from the NPBL to join the MBC alongside them.

== Roster ==
Due to information on National Professional Basketball League players being generally hard to find, there are bound to be more gaps and/or inaccuracies found in certain areas on the team's roster spots than usual.

Player	Position
Bob Arnold	G/F
Jim Baker	G
Chuck Bobilya	C
Walt Bonham	G
Byron Evard	G
Ab Franke	G
Marty Ellenwood	G
Ife Holmes	G
Paul Jaspar	F/C
Hank Kowalczyk	C
Walt Krull	G/F
Bud Lindenberg	G
Ward Myers	F
Ralph Miller	F
Frank Shimek	G
Gadget Ward	G/F

Note: In addition to all of these players, the Chiefs also had two unknown players in an all-around kind of player with the last name of Hoffman and a center with the last name of McKenzie briefly playing for the team as well.

== NPBL Standings ==
Pos.	Team	Wins	Losses	Win %
1	Akron Firestone Non-Skids	10	1	.909
2	Toledo Crimson Coaches Tobaccos	8	4	.667
3	Indianapolis Kautskys	7	4	.636
4	Akron Goodyear Wingfoots	2	4	.333
5	Fort Wayne Chiefs	4	9	.308
6	Kokomo Kelts†	2	3	.400
7	Muncie Whys†	1	4	.200
8	South Bend Guardsmen†	1	5	.167
9	Lorain Fisher Foods†	0	1	.000

† – Dropped out of the NPBL at various points in the season.
