= Chuck Karmarkovich =

American basketball player

Personal information
- Born: March 1, 1927
- Died: January 11, 1951 (aged 23) Johnstown, Pennsylvania, U.S.
- Listed height: 6 ft 3 in (1.91 m)
- Listed weight: 176 lb (80 kg)

Career information
- High school: Franklin Borough (Franklin, Pennsylvania)
- College: Waynesburg (1947–1950)
- Playing career: 1950–1951
- Position: Forward / center

Career history
- 1950: Altoona Flyers
- 1950–1951: Johnstown Clippers

Career highlights
- 3× First team All-Pennsylvania (1948–1950)

George "Chuck" Karmarkovich (March 17, 1927 – January 11, 1951) was an American basketball player. He played college basketball for Waynesburg University where he scored 1,111 points from 1947 to 1950 and was a three time All-State. Following his college career, he played for the Altoona Flyers in the All-American Basketball League (AABL) in 1950. After receiving a trial with Baltimore Bullets of the National Basketball Association, he played for the Johnstown Clippers of the AABL.

Karmarkovich died on January 11, 1951, from injuries sustained in an automobile accident a day earlier. The accident occurred when the car that Karmarkovich was a passenger in, and driven by the Clippers' coach Nat Hickey, skidded on ice, and struck another car. Karmarkovich was taken to Memorial Hospital in Johnstown, Pennsylvania, where he died of a fractured skull and internal injuries. As a result of his death, the Clippers were disbanded and Hickey stepped away from basketball for good.

== See also ==
- List of basketball players who died during their careers
