= Arnold Jones =

Arnold Jones may refer to:

- Arnold Elzey (Arnold Elzey Jones, 1816–1871), Confederate general during the American Civil War
- A. H. M. Jones (Arnold Hugh Martin Jones, 1904–1970), English historian of classical antiquity
- Casey Jones (Teenage Mutant Ninja Turtles) (Arnold Bernid Jones), a fictional character that appears in Teenage Mutant Ninja Turtles comics

== See also ==
- Janice Arnold-Jones (born 1952), American politician
