= Moon Klinzing =

American basketball player and basketball referee

Personal information
- Full name: Carl Martin Klinzing
- Born: January 24, 1899 Pittsburgh, Pennsylvania, U.S.
- Died: November 13, 1995 (aged 96)

Sport
- Sport: Basketball and football

Moon Klinzing (born Carl Martin Klinzing; January 24, 1899 – November 13, 1995) was a basketball player and a basketball referee.

== Information ==
Klinzing played high school basketball for Pittsburgh South High School in 1915. He played as a guard and his team later captured the city championship. his coach, Ben Lubic, then made him a forward. He later played basketball for Duquesne University as a forward. He also played on the Duquesne University football team as a lineman and on the baseball team.

He continued to play basketball after college, playing professionally for the Pittsburgh Morrys by 1923. He also played independent football at the same time with the Ormsby Club of Pittsburgh while also being a plumber.

Klinzing played for the Cleveland Rosenblum in 1927 but later returned to the Morrys. Klinzing joined the Pittsburgh Fintex in 1930.

Klinzing later became a basketball referee and helped officiate for St. Paul's Orphanage football team. In 1946, he was elected the president of the Irish Terrier Club.

Klinzing later became a mutli-time Hall of Famer, being inducted into hall of fames ran by Western PA Sports, Duquesne University, The WPIALL, The PIAA and The IAABO.

Klinzing died on November 13, 1996, at the age of 96. He had five children and 14 grandchildren.

== Personal life ==
His brother, known as Boots Klinzing, also played professional basketball.
