= Tubby Raskin =

American basketball player and coach (1902–1981)

Personal information
- Born: January 8, 1902 The Bronx, New York, U.S.
- Died: September 9, 1981 (aged 79) Tucson, Arizona, U.S.
- Listed height: 5 ft 8 in (1.73 m)
- Listed weight: 165 lb (75 kg)

Career information
- High school: DeWitt Clinton (The Bronx, New York)
- College: CCNY (1919–1922)

Career history
- 1925–1926: Brooklyn Arcadians

Morris "Tubby" Raskin (Hebrew: מוריס "טאבי" רסקין; January 8, 1902 – September 9, 1981) was an American basketball player and coach. He played for the Brooklyn Arcadians in the American Basketball League (ABL). He later coached the men's basketball team at Brooklyn College, the Hartford Hurricanes in the ABL, the Israel men's national basketball team for Israel at the 1952 Summer Olympics, and the U.S. basketball team to a gold medal in the 1953 Maccabiah Games.

== Early years ==
Raskin was born and grew up in the Bronx in New York City, and was Jewish. He was 5 ft 8 in (1.73 m), and weighed 165 pounds (75 kg). He starred in baseball and basketball at DeWitt Clinton High School, in the Bronx.

At City College of New York, Raskin was a member of the varsity basketball team in 1919–22, played on the varsity football team as its quarterback and kicker, and was the regular first baseman and a pitcher on the baseball team. Raskin became a member of the basketball team in 1919–20, when Nat Holman became CCNY's head basketball coach. That season, the CCNY Beavers had a record of 13–3. The next year, he was elected captain of the basketball team as a junior, and City College had a record of 11–4. As a senior in the 1921–22 season, he was captain of the team, led them to a 10–2 record, and was also captain of the baseball team. He was elected to the CCNY Hall of Fame.

== Career ==
=== As a player, and soldier ===
After he graduated from CCNY in 1922, Raskin played independent basketball in New York City. In 1925–26, he played for the Brooklyn Arcadians in the American Basketball League (ABL). During World War II, he took a leave of absence and served as a lieutenant in the US Army Air Force from 1942 to 1944.

=== As a coach ===
==== In the United States ====
Raskin coached the Brooklyn Bulldogs basketball team at Brooklyn College in 1944–45, 1950-53 (replacing Al Baggett), and 1960–62. In 1950-51 he also coached the Brooklyn College tennis team.

He also coached the Cohoes Mastadons in the New York State Professional Basketball League in 1946–47. He coached the Hartford Hurricanes in the ABL in 1948–50.

==== Internationally ====
Raskin was the coach of the Israel men's national basketball team that played for Israel at the 1952 Summer Olympics in Basketball at the 1952 Summer Olympics in Helsinki.

The following year he coached the U.S. basketball team to a gold medal in the 1953 Maccabiah Games.
