= Marty Friedman (basketball) =

American basketball player and coach (1889–1986)

Max Friedman

New York Whirlwinds
- League: ABL

Personal information
- Born: July 12, 1889 New York City, New York, US
- Died: January 1, 1986 (aged 96)

Career information
- High school: Hebrew Technical Institute

Max "Marty" Friedman (July 12, 1889 – January 1, 1986) was an American Hall of Fame pro basketball player and coach.

Raised in New York City, he played in various pre-NBA leagues for eighteen years, most notably for the New York Whirlwinds. Known as one of the best defensive guards of his era, Friedman later coached the Troy Haymakers. He promoted basketball internationally during World War I, organizing a 600-team tournament in France that led to the Inter-Allied Games. Post-retirement, he owned a parking garage in New York City before retiring in 1959. Friedman was inducted into multiple halls of fame and named to the All-Time Pro Second Team in 1941.

== Early life ==
Friedman was born in New York City and grew up on Manhattan's Lower East Side. He attended high school at Hebrew Technical Institute.

== Career ==
Friedman played eighteen years of pro basketball in many different pre-NBA leagues but is best known for playing with the New York Whirlwinds. He is considered to be one of the best defensive guards of his era. He later became coach of the Troy Haymakers in the ABL (1938/39). In a seventeen-year career (1910–1927), Friedman played in almost every league in the East, habitually leading his team to championships. In 1921, he played with the New York Whirlwinds. In the World Championship series, 11,000 people watched Friedman hold Celtics' shooting star Johnny Beckman to one field goal as the Whirlwinds defeated the Original Celtics, 40–27. The Celtics won the second game, 26–24, but officials were afraid that the excitable and unruly crowds would lose control, and the deciding third game was never played.

When World War I began, Friedman promoted basketball internationally. He organized a 600-team tournament in France, which prompted the Inter-Allied Games, a forerunner to the World Championships and Olympic recognition.

He and Barney Sedran were referred to as "The Heavenly Twins". After his retirement from basketball, Friedman became the owner of a parking garage (his father had owned a pushcart stable), located at East 49th Street, east of First Avenue, in New York City, which served Tudor City Apartments and environs. He sold his garage and retired in 1959, at the age of seventy.

Friedman was named to the Basketball Hall of Fame, the International Jewish Sports Hall of Fame, the New York City Basketball Hall of Fame, and the All-Time Pro Second Team in 1941.

== See also ==
- List of Jewish basketball players
