= Bill McElwain =

American football player and sports coach (1903–1996)

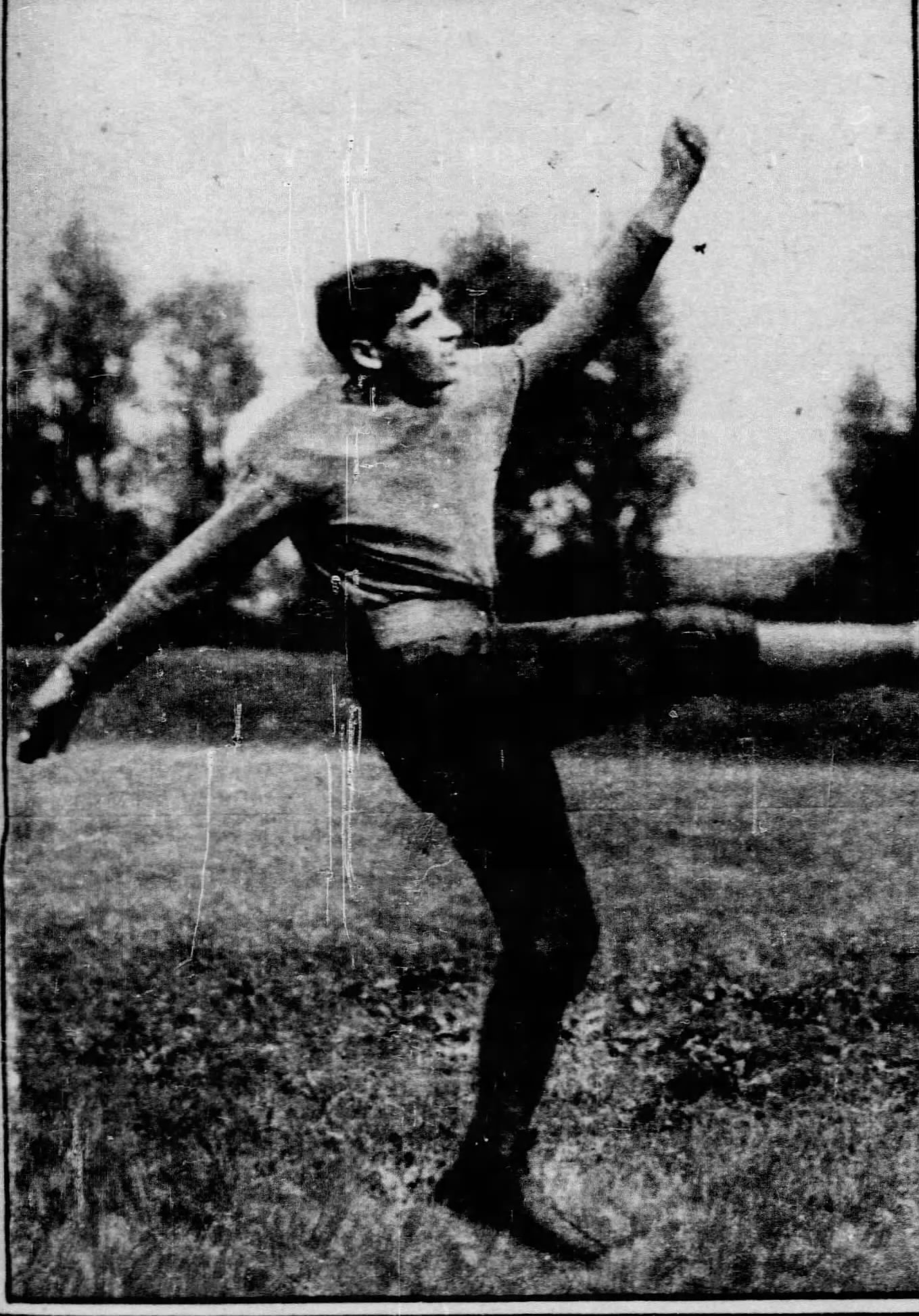
- McElwain in 1923 as Northwestern's football team captain

Biographical details
- Born: May 14, 1903; Chicago, Illinois, U.S.
- Died: November 26, 1996 (aged 93); Big Rapids, Michigan, U.S.

Playing career

Football
- 1921–1923: Northwestern
- 1924: Chicago Cardinals
- 1925: Chicago Bears
- 1926: Chicago Cardinals
- Position: Halfback

Coaching career (HC unless noted)

Football
- 1927–1939: Ferris Institute

Basketball
- 1927–1940: Ferris Institute

Administrative career (AD unless noted)
- 1927–?: Ferris Institute

Head coaching record
- Overall: 31–44–7 (football); 109–127 (basketball)

Accomplishments and honors

Championships
- Football; 1 MOCC (1937)

William Thompson McElwain (May 14, 1903 – November 26, 1996) was an American football player and coach of football and basketball. McElwain played college football at Northwestern University and professionally in the National Football League (NFL) with the Chicago Cardinals and alongside Red Grange with the Chicago Bears. McElwain served as the head football coach at Ferris Institute—now known as Ferris State University—in Big Rapids, Michigan from 1927 to 1939, compiling a record of 31–44–7. He was also the head basketball coach at Ferris State from 1927 to 1940, tallying a mark of 109–127.

== Head coaching record ==
=== Football ===
Year	Team	Overall	Conference	Standing	Bowl/playoffs
Ferris Institute Bulldogs (Independent) (1927–1936)
1927	Ferris Institute	4–3			
1928	Ferris Institute	6–2			
1929	Ferris Institute	3–2–1			
1930	Ferris Institute	3–3			
1931	Ferris Institute	3–4–1			
1932	No team				
1933	Ferris Institute	2–4			
1934	Ferris Institute	1–5			
1935	Ferris Institute	4–2			
1936	Ferris Institute	1–5–1			
Ferris Institute Bulldogs (Michigan-Ontario Collegiate Conference) (1937–1939)
1937	Ferris Institute	2–3–2	2–0–1	T–1st	
1938	Ferris Institute	0–5–2	0–1–2	T–3rd	
1939	Ferris Institute	2–6	2–2	T–2nd	
Ferris Institute:		31–44–7	2–3–2		
Total:		31–44–7			
National championship Conference title Conference division title or championship game berth
