= Nat Hickey =

Croatian-American basketball player and coach (1902–1979)

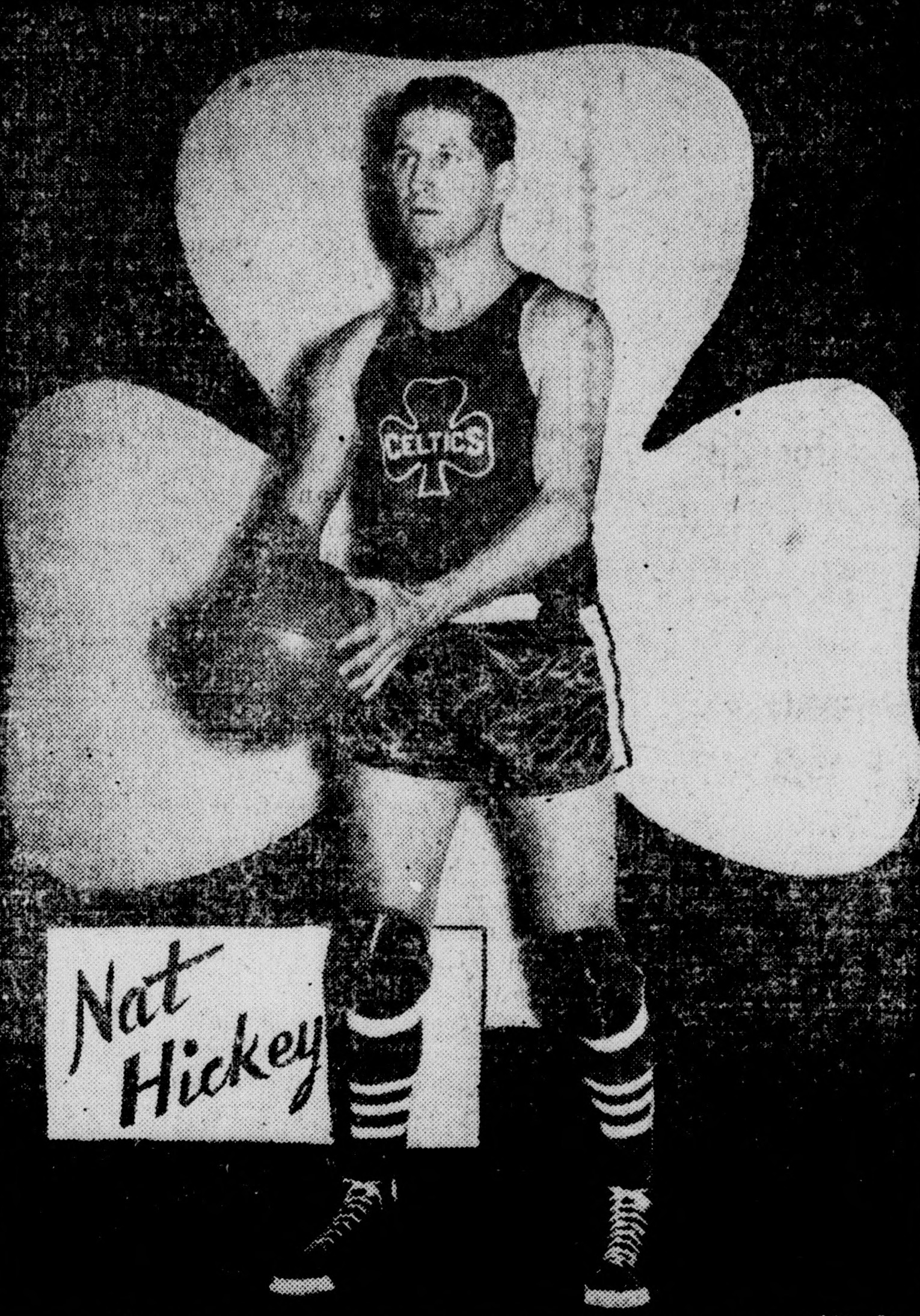
- Hickey with the Original Celtics, c. 1941

Personal information
- Born: January 30, 1902 Korčula, Dalmatia, Austria-Hungary
- Died: September 16, 1979 (aged 77) Johnstown, Pennsylvania, U.S.
- Listed height: 5 ft 11 in (1.80 m)
- Listed weight: 180 lb (82 kg)

Career information
- High school: Hoboken (Hoboken, New Jersey)
- Playing career: 1921–1948
- Position: Guard / forward
- Number: 11
- Coaching career: 1944–1951

Career history

Playing
- 1921–1922: Hoboken St. Joseph's
- 1922–1923: Eddie Holly's Majors
- 1922–1923: New York Crescents
- 1923–1925: Eddie Holly's Majors
- 1925–1929: Cleveland Rosenblums
- 1929–1931: Chicago Bruins
- 1931–1934: Original Celtics
- 1934–1935: Boston Trojans
- 1935–1942: Original Celtics
- 1944–1945: Pittsburgh Raiders
- 1945–1946: Indianapolis Kautskys
- 1946–1948: Buffalo Bisons / Tri-Cities Blackhawks
- 1948: Providence Steamrollers

Coaching
- 1944–1945: Pittsburgh Raiders
- 1945–1946: Indianapolis Kautskys
- 1946–1948: Buffalo Bisons / Tri-Cities Blackhawks
- 1948: Providence Steamrollers (interim HC)
- 1950–1951: Johnstown Clippers

Career highlights
- ABL champion (1926); All-Time Pro Stars Second Team (1945)
- Stats at NBA.com
- Stats at Basketball Reference

Nicholas J. "Nat" Hickey (born Nicola Zarnecić; January 30, 1902 – September 16, 1979) was a Croatian-American professional basketball coach/player and baseball player. He turned to coaching basketball after his retirement from playing full-time in 1942 but occasionally activated himself as a player for the teams he was coaching. In 1948, Hickey played two games with the Providence Steamrollers at the age of 45 while serving as the team's head coach in the Basketball Association of America (BAA). As the precursor to the National Basketball Association (NBA), his appearances in the BAA make him the oldest player in NBA history.

== Early life ==
Hickey was born Nicola Zarnecić on the Croatian island of Korčula (then Kingdom of Dalmatia, Austro-Hungary). He attended Hoboken High School in Hoboken, New Jersey.

== Professional basketball career ==
As a 5'11" guard/forward, Hickey played from the 1920s through 1940s with multiple early professional teams, including the Hoboken St. Joseph's, Eddie Holly's Majors, New York Crescents, Cleveland Rosenblums, the Chicago Bruins, Boston Trojans, and the Original Celtics of the American Basketball League as a player, as well as the Pittsburgh Raiders, Indianapolis Kautskys, and Buffalo Bisons / Tri-Cities Blackhawks of the National Basketball League as a player-coach for those teams there. Due to his status as a player-coach for the last team in particular during their inaugural and second seasons, he became one of eight players from the original Buffalo Bisons NBL team of 1946 who moved from Buffalo, New York to the "Tri-Cities" area of Moline, Illinois to become the Tri-Cities Blackhawks, a team ancestral to the Atlanta Hawks.

=== Providence Steamrollers (1948) ===
On January 1, 1948, Hickey was appointed as head coach of the Providence Steamrollers of the Basketball Association of America (BAA). He replaced the previous coach, Hank Soar, who had accumulated a 2–17 record. On January 23, Hickey was placed on the active playing list for the Steamrollers and appeared in uniform for a game against the Washington Capitols the following night but did not play. On January 27, he played in a game against the St. Louis Bombers and recorded two points from free throws.

On January 28, the Steamrollers were five points behind in a game against the New York Knicks when Hickey checked himself in. He played the last 3.5 minutes of the first half during which time he missed his only field goal attempt and committed four personal fouls. The Knicks' margin ballooned to 19 points during Hickey's playing time and they eventually won the game 75–71. Hickey was two days away from his 46th birthday and was believed to be the oldest active professional basketball player at the time; he played against the Knicks' 20-year-old Carl Braun who was the youngest professional basketball player. He was lampooned after his Knicks appearance in an article by the Associated Press which ridiculed him as an "old geezer" and "ancient pro." Hickey dismissed the criticism by stating that he only played because he believed he could help the team and said, "please don't think I'm simply playing to get some publicity as the oldest active pro basketball player."

As a result of his appearance in the Knicks game, Hickey still holds the record for the oldest player in NBA history at 45 years and 363 days. He expressed a desire to play again, even being expected to play in a game against the Boston Celtics two days later, but ultimately continued with only his coaching duties. The Steamrollers accumulated a 4–25 record under Hickey and he was replaced by Ken Loeffler at the end of the season.

=== Johnstown Clippers (1951) ===
Hickey became the coach of the Johnstown Clippers of the All-American Basketball League during the 1950–51 season. On January 11, 1951, Hickey was driving the team back to Johnstown, Pennsylvania, after a game in Wheeling, West Virginia, when he lost control of his car on the Lincoln Highway and crashed. Clippers player George "Chuck" Karmarkovich, a 24-year-old who was considered the team's biggest star, was ejected from the car and killed. Hickey claimed that it was his first accident in 29 years of driving. The Clippers were disbanded the following day and Hickey did not return to coaching. Hickey was found to not be responsible for Karmarkovich's death.

== Professional baseball career ==
Aside from basketball, Hickey enjoyed a lengthy career in baseball, playing 15 minor league seasons and managing two. Hickey managed and played several seasons of minor league baseball as an outfielder. Notably, he was baseball Hall of Famer Stan Musial's first minor league manager with the Williamson Colts in 1938.

Hickey was inducted into the Cambria County Sports Hall of Fame in 1965 for his basketball and baseball achievements.

== Personal life ==
Hickey was a cousin of parachute jumper Nick Piantanida.

Hickey died on September 16, 1979, in Johnstown, Pennsylvania.

== Career statistics ==
Legend
GP	Games played	FGM	Field-goals made
FG%	Field-goal percentage	FTM	Free-throws made
FTA	Free-throws attempted	FT%	Free-throw percentage
APG	Assists per game	PTS	Points
PPG	Points per game	**Bold**	Career high

=== NBL ===
==== Regular season ====
Year	Team	GP	FGM	FTM	FTA	FT%	PTS	PPG
1944–45	Pittsburgh	2	3	2			8	4.0
1945–46	Indianapolis	**13**	**30**	**13**			**73**	**5.6**
1946–47	Buffalo / Tri-Cities	8	9	6	**12**	.500	24	3.0
1947–48	Tri-Cities	3	1	1	1	**1.000**	3	1.0
Career		26	43	22	13	.538	108	4.2

=== NBA ===
==== Regular season ====
Year	Team	GP	FG%	FT%	APG	PPG
1947–48	Providence	2	.000	.667	.0	1.0

== Head coaching record ==
Legend
Regular season	G	Games coached	W	Games won	L	Games lost	W–L %	Win–loss %
Playoffs	PG	Playoff games	PW	Playoff wins	PL	Playoff losses	PW–L %	Playoff win–loss %

Team	Year	G	W	L	W–L%	Finish	PG	PW	PL	PW–L%	Result
Providence	1947–48	29	4	25	.138	4th in Eastern	—	—	—	—	Missed playoffs

== See also ==
- List of oldest and youngest National Basketball Association players
- List of National Basketball Association player-coaches
