= Ralph Miller (third baseman) =

American baseball player (1896–1939)

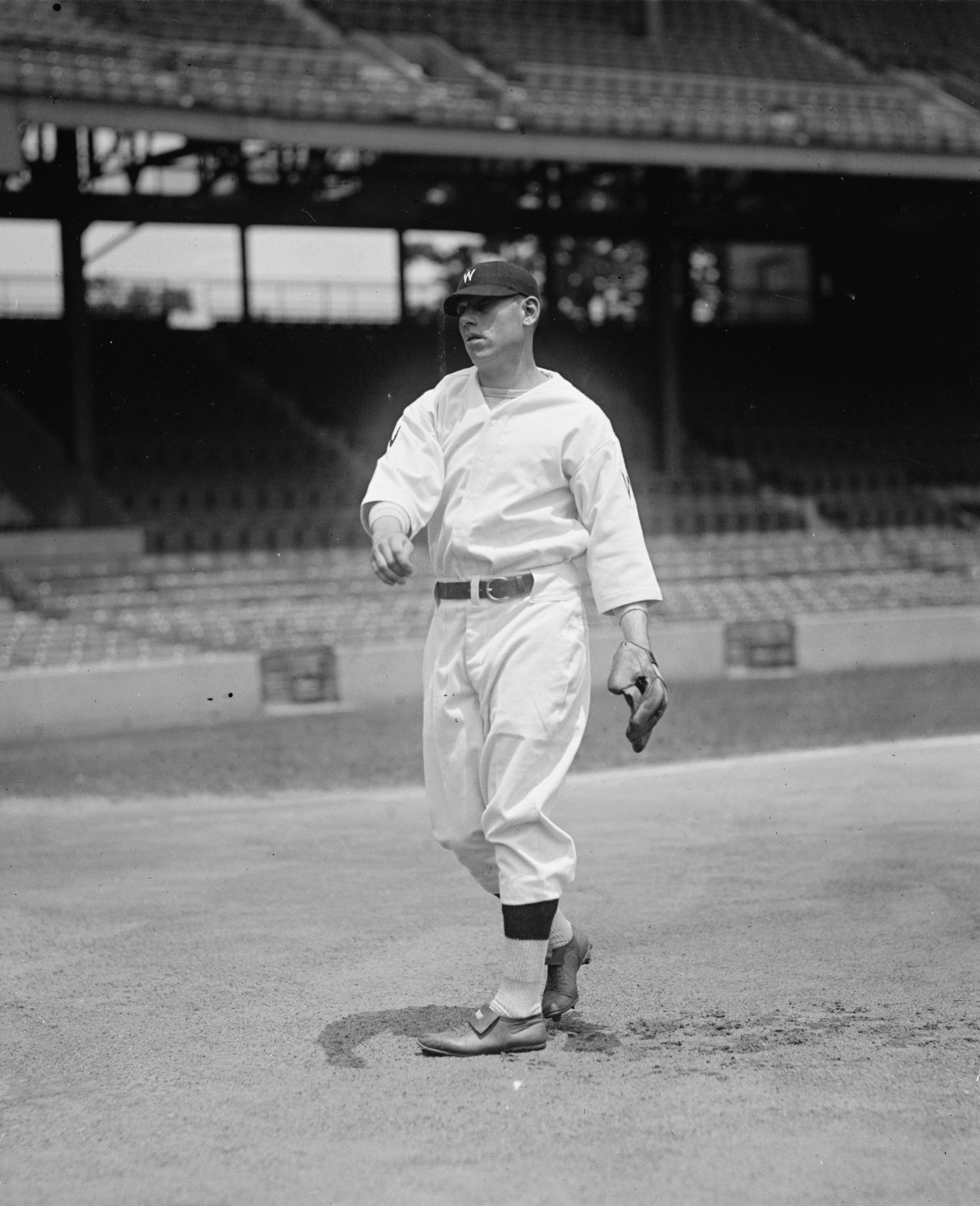
- Third baseman / Shortstop
- Born: February 29, 1896; Fort Wayne, Indiana, U.S.
- Died: March 18, 1939 (aged 43); Fort Wayne, Indiana, U.S.
- Batted: Right Threw: Right

MLB debut
- April 14, 1920, for the Philadelphia Phillies

Last MLB appearance
- September 30, 1924, for the Washington Senators

MLB statistics
- Batting average: .248
- Home runss: 3
- Runs batted in: 54
- Stats at Baseball Reference

Teams
- Philadelphia Phillies (1920–1921); Washington Senators (1924)

Ralph Joseph Miller (February 29, 1896 – March 18, 1939) was an American Major League Baseball player who played infield from 1920–1924. He would play for the Philadelphia Phillies and Washington Senators.

In 163 games over 3 seasons, Miller posted a .248 batting average with 48 runs, 3 home runs and 54 RBI. In the 1924 World Series, he hit .182 (2-for-11) with 2 RBI.

From 1925 to 1933, Miller was the player coach for the Fort Wayne Hoosiers of the American Basketball League and the Fort Wayne Chiefs of the National Professional Basketball League.
