= Carl Husta =

American baseball player (1902–1951)

- Shortstop
- Born: April 8, 1902; Egg Harbor City, New Jersey, U.S.
- Died: November 6, 1951 (aged 49); Kingston, New York, U.S.
- Batted: Right Threw: Right

MLB debut
- September 24, 1925, for the Philadelphia Athletics

Last MLB appearance
- October 3, 1925, for the Philadelphia Athletics

MLB statistics
- Batting average: .136
- Home runs: 0
- Runs batted in: 2
- Stats at Baseball Reference

Teams
- Philadelphia Athletics (1925)

Carl Lawrence Husta (April 8, 1902 – November 6, 1951) was an American baseball and basketball player. He was one of the top basketball players of the 1920s and 30s, playing for the Cleveland Rosenblums, Fort Wayne Hoosiers, Camden Brewers, Boston Trojans, Kingston Colonials, and Troy Celtics of the American Basketball League and the independent Toledo Red Man Tobaccos and Original Celtics. Nicknamed "Sox", he was also an infielder for Major League Baseball's Philadelphia Athletics during the 1925 season. He died in Kingston, New York, in 1951. Despite his low scoring averages, Husta would also be considered the leading scorer of the original ABL's existence with 2,194 total points scored (albeit barely being ahead of Cas Ostrowski, Bennie Borgmann, and Phil Rabin there) due in part to him playing in both the original era and its revived era at the time.
