= Brooklyn Arcadians =

The Brooklyn Arcadians were an American basketball team based in Brooklyn, New York, that was a member of the American Basketball League. The team was named after Arcadia Hall, where they played their home games. The team was replaced by the New York Celtics five games into their second and final season; the Celtics would later win the second ABL season's championship while operating as the replacements for the Arcadians for the rest of that particular season of play. During their brief existence as a franchise, the team would be owned and operated by Major League Baseball Hall of Fame star hitter Harry Heilmann from the Detroit Tigers.

== Year-by-year ==
Year	League	Reg. season	Playoffs
1925/26	ABL	1st (1st half); 4th (2nd half)	Finals
1926/27	ABL	Replaced after 5 games	N/A

== Notable players ==
- Tubby Raskin (1902–1981), basketball player and coach
