= Cleveland Rosenblums =

Basketball team in Ohio, US

- Leagues: Independent 1919–1925; American Basketball League 1925–1931
- Founded: 1919
- Folded: 1931

The Cleveland Rosenblums (also known as the Rosies) were an American basketball team based in Cleveland, Ohio, that was one of the original members of the American Basketball League. The Rosenblums played in the league between 1925 and 1930, winning three championships before dropping out.

== Early years ==
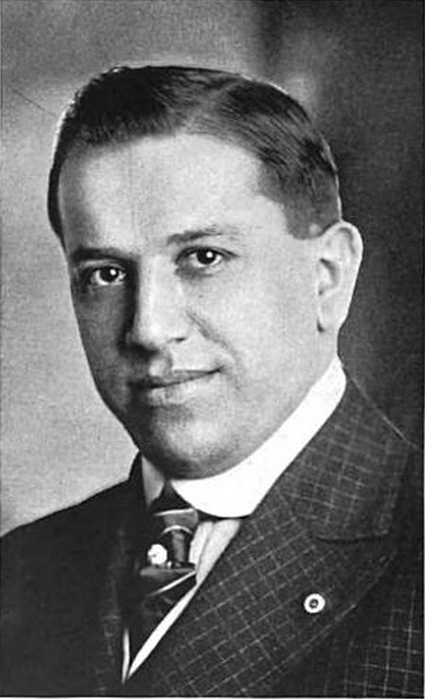
Team owner Max Rosenblum, c. 1918

The Rosenblums were organized in the late 1910s and were owned by Cleveland department store owner, Max Rosenblum (1877–1953). Originally known as the "Rosenblum Credits", the 1919 team compiled a record of 18–2 and was selected by Cleveland sporting editors as "the recognized champions of Ohio."

During the 1922–1923 season, the team became known as "the fastest basket ball aggregation in this part of the country," and consisted of "an array of former college stars," including Kelly McBride, who was the team's top scorer for several seasons. The 1922–1923 team was coached by Bill Lange, who later led the North Carolina Tar Heels men's basketball team to its first NCAA tournament appearance in 1941.

In April 1924, the Rosenblums traveled to Brooklyn to compete in a tournament of five professional basketball teams. The tournament was organized as a fundraiser for the U.S. Olympic Committee. The Rosenblums lost in the tournament to the Original Celtics by a score of 25 to 17 in a game that featured a fight late in the game between Celtics player Nat Holman and Marty Friedman, forward for the Rosenblums. Both players were ejected from the game.

== Formation of the American Basketball League ==
In April 1925, Rosenblum hosted an organizational meeting at the Hotel Statler in Cleveland to establish a professional basketball league that was originally called the National Basketball League. The Pittsburgh Press reported at the time, "Max Rosenblum, of Cleveland, who has sponsored professional basketball on a large scale for many years, is the leading spirit in the organization."

== First ABL championship ==
In the inaugural 1925–1926 season of the American Professional Basketball League, the Rosenblums compiled a record of 23–7. Their leading scorers were John "Honey" Russell (216 points), Nat Hickey (198 points), and Carl Husta (158 points). On April 9, 1926, the Rosenblums won the ABL's first championship by defeating the Brooklyn Arcadians by a score of 23–22 in the final game of the league's first championship series played at Brooklyn's 71st Infantry Regiment Armory. The championship was decided in a best-of-five series, and the Rosenblums won in three consecutive games. The Rosenblums won the first and second games at Cleveland's Public Hall by scores of 36–33 and 37–21. The New York Times described the Rosenblums' playing style in the final game as follows:

"Although Cleveland deceived the Brooklyn players by short, tricky passes at various stages of the game the main strategy of the invaders seemed to be to get a few points ahead and then play catch with the ball to prevent the Brooklyn players from getting a chance. In the final six minutes, when Cleveland's margin was never more than a point or two, the ball was 'frozen' or passed from hand to hand for four minutes of the time."

The starting five for the Rosenblums' 1925–1926 championship team was Carl Husta (left forward), Nat Hickey (right forward), Rich Deighan (center), Dave Kerr (left guard), and John "Honey" Russell (right guard).

== Later years ==
During the 1926–1927 season, the Rosenblums went 17–4 in the first half of the season but fell to 9–12 in the second half. The team's decline in the second half of the season followed a falling-out between Max Rosenblum and Honey Russell that ended with Russell being traded to the Chicago Bruins. The team's leading scorers for the 1926–1927 season were Nat Hickey (343 points) and Carl Husta (330 points). Having won the first half of the season, the Rosenblums returned to the ABL championship series in the spring of 1927. They lost the championship series in three consecutive games to the Original Celtics.

The team won its second and third ABL championships, known as the world series of professional basketball, in the 1928–1929 and 1929–1930 seasons. The team dropped out during the first half of the 1930–1931 season on December 8, 1930.

== Annual record ==
Year	League	Reg. season	Playoffs
1925/26	ABL	2nd (1st half); 1st (2nd half)	Champion
1926/27	ABL	1st (1st half); 5th (2nd half)	Finals
1927/28	ABL	2nd, Western	Playoffs
1928/29	ABL	1st (1st half); 3rd (2nd half)	Champion
1929/30	ABL	1st (1st half); 2nd (2nd half)	Champion
1930/31	ABL	7th (1st half)	N/A
