= Fort Wayne Hoosiers =

Defunct American professional basketball team

The Fort Wayne Hoosiers (originally the Fort Wayne Caseys and initially the Fort Wayne Major Hoosiers not long afterward) were an American basketball team based in Fort Wayne, Indiana that was a member of the American Basketball League.

The club finished the 1927–28, 1928–29, and 1930–31 seasons as runners-up. Supposedly, the Hoosiers would later return and rebrand themselves into the Fort Wayne Chiefs for the National Professional Basketball League (a precursor league of sorts to the National Basketball League that would eventually merge with the Basketball Association of America to become the present-day National Basketball Association) for the 1932–33 season, finishing with a 4–9 record before folding operations for good.

== Year-by-year ==
Year	League	Reg. season	Playoffs
1925/26	ABL	5th (1st half); 5th (2nd half)	Did not qualify
1926/27	ABL	5th (1st half); 2nd (2nd half)	Did not qualify
1927/28	ABL	1st, Western	Finals
1928/29	ABL	2nd (1st half); 1st (2nd half)	Finals
1929/30	ABL	5th (1st half); 5th (2nd half)	Did not qualify
1930/31	ABL	2nd (1st half); 1st(t) (2nd half)	Finals
1932/33	NPBL	5th	Did not qualify

== See also ==
- History of sports in Fort Wayne, Indiana
