= 1932–33 Toledo Crimson Coaches Tobaccos season =

- League: National Professional Basketball League
- Head coach: Pip Koehler & Ed Cannon
- General manager: Ed Cannon
- Owner(s): Pinkerton Tobacco; Crimson Coaches Tobacco(?)
- Arena: The Field House (University of Toledo); Toledo Coliseum

Results
- Record: 8–4 (.667)
- Place: Conference: 2nd
- Playoff finish: Lost NPBL championship series 0–3 to the Akron Firestone Non-Skids

The 1932–33 Toledo Crimson Coaches Tobaccos season was the third and final professional basketball season played by the team formerly known as the Toledo Red Man Tobaccos due to their association with the Pinkerton Tobacco company who was formerly known at the time as Red Man Tobacco (as well as their only season of play while under the Crimson Coaches (Tobaccos) name, which supposedly stemmed from another tobacco company called the Crimson Coaches) during what would be the first and only professional basketball season of what would later be known as the second iteration of the National Professional Basketball League, with this version of the NPBL being a precursor to both the Midwest Basketball Conference and the National Basketball League (with the latter league eventually merging operations with the Basketball Association of America to become the present-day National Basketball Association). This rendition of the National Professional Basketball League would not be related to either the 1926 version of the National Basketball League (which was also a completely different league from the first ever professional basketball league known as the National Basket Ball League that was around at the end of the 19th century and the start of the 20th century) that hosted both the Original Celtics and the Brooklyn Visitations as teams there nor would it officially be related to the first version of the NPBL which ended the 1920s and started the 1930s decades that the Toledo squad would technically be a part of, with that version of the NPBL later becoming a precursor to both the Midwest Basketball Conference and the National Basketball League (with the latter league eventually merging operations with the Basketball Association of America to become the present-day National Basketball Association), though there would be some outlets that would misconstrue the different leagues mentioned as being a part of the overall history for the NBL that eventually became a part of the NBA. In any case, the Toledo Crimson Coaches (Tobaccos) entered the season as a part of a new nine team league that also featured two works teams in the Akron Firestone Non-Skids and the Akron Goodyear Wingfoots, a (potentially) fellow ABL team from its final (original) season of existence in the Fort Wayne Chiefs, and a rising newcomer franchise in the Indianapolis Kautskys that would be owned by farmer turned grocer Frank Kautsky as some of the other teams that would be competing in this league. (Interestingly, this rebranded Toledo squad originally planned to compete in a league that was initially a final attempt for creating the NPBL, which had representatives in the Fort Wayne, Indiana area within their Anthony Wayne Hotel being joined by representatives in Chicago, Illinois and other Ohio locations beyond their home area in Akron, Canton, Cleveland, and Dayton meeting at the time for an eight-team league before eventually deciding to be a combined Indiana-Ohio nine-team league there.)

During their only season in what can officially be considered as the second iteration of the NPBL (primarily for this franchise), Toledo would end up being a game ahead of the Indianapolis Kautskys (thanks to an extra win on Toledo's end) by finishing the season with an 8–4 record, which would be good for a second place finish behind the nearby, nearly undefeated Akron Firestone Non-Skids works team. While the Crimson Coaches (Tobaccos) wouldn't be considered the best team in this new rendition of the NPBL, they would end up qualifying for the NPBL's playoffs (which really was just a best-of-five championship series between the two best teams of the season in Akron's Firestone franchise and Toledo's recently rebranded franchise). Unfortunately for Toledo, luck wouldn't strike twice in their favor to win "back-to-back" championships within the NPBL (even if they are different iterations at hand), as the Crimson Coaches (Tobaccos) would end up being swept 3–0 by the Firestone works team from Akron. Following this season's conclusion, the Toledo Crimson Coaches (Tobaccos) would keep the new name, but remain independent as a franchise for the rest of their existence up until 1935 when they folded operations entirely as a team. Had they remained active for at least one more season, it's possible (albeit rather unlikely) that the Akron Firestone Non-Skids and the Indianapolis Kautskys via respective team leaders Paul Sheeks and Frank Kautsky would have potentially included Toledo as a team for the newly-created Midwest Basketball Conference, which later turned into the National Basketball League, which eventually merged operations with the Basketball Association of America to become the present-day National Basketball Association.

== Roster ==
Due to information on National Professional Basketball League players being generally hard to find, there are bound to be more gaps and/or inaccuracies found in certain areas on the team's roster spots than usual.

1932–33 Toledo Crimson Coaches Tobaccos roster
Players

Pos.	No.	Player	Height	Weight	DOB	From
C		Jim Barnham	6 ft 4 in (1.93 m)	190 lb (86 kg)	1903-01-30	Missouri
F		Hank Hubbard	6 ft 2 in (1.88 m)	160 lb (73 kg)	1913-05-22	No college
G		Fred Jacobs	5 ft 10 in (1.78 m)	175 lb (79 kg)	1907-09-14	Woodward Technical HS (OH)
G/F		Pip Koehler	5 ft 10 in (1.78 m)	165 lb (75 kg)	1902-01-16	Penn State
G		Arnie Straka	5 ft 11 in (1.80 m)	175 lb (79 kg)	1910-10-18	Toledo
G/F		Ollie Wiza	6 ft 1 in (1.85 m)	185 lb (84 kg)	1910-12-25	No college
C		Abe Yourist	6 ft 2 in (1.88 m)	210 lb (95 kg)	1911-09-26	Heidelberg

Coaches
Head coach

Pip Koehler
Ed Cannon

Legend
- (DP) Unsigned draft pick
- (FA) Free agent
- (S) Suspended
- Injured

Note: Neither Jim Barnham nor Hank Hubbard would be a part of the team's playoff roster for this season, although an unknown center with the last name of Anderson would end up briefly taking part of the team's roster for the NPBL's championship series this time around for some reason.

== NPBL Standings ==
Pos.	Team	Wins	Losses	Win %
1	Akron Firestone Non-Skids	10	1	.909
2	Toledo Crimson Coaches Tobaccos	8	4	.667
3	Indianapolis Kautskys	7	4	.636
4	Akron Goodyear Wingfoots	2	4	.333
5	Fort Wayne Chiefs	4	9	.308
6	Kokomo Kelts†	2	3	.400
7	Muncie Whys†	1	4	.200
8	South Bend Guardsmen†	1	5	.167
9	Lorain Fisher Foods†	0	1	.000

† – Dropped out of the NPBL at various points in the season.

== NPBL Playoffs ==
Due to this version of the NPBL going down from nine teams to only five competitive teams by the end of the season, the playoff format used for this league would involve the two best teams from the NPBL (which coincidentally were both in the state of Ohio) competing in a best-of-five championship series.

=== NPBL Championship Series ===
(1) Akron Firestone Non-Skids Vs. (2) Toledo Crimson Coaches Tobaccos: Akron wins series 3–0

- Game 1 @ Toledo: Akron Firestone Non-Skids 18, Toledo Crimson Coaches Tobaccos 13
- Game 2 @ Akron: Akron Firestone Non-Skids 31, Toledo Crimson Coaches Tobaccos 24
- Game 3 @ Toledo: Akron Firestone Non-Skids 27, Toledo Crimson Coaches Tobaccos 24
