= 1926–27 Chicago Bruins season =

- League: American Basketball League (original)
- Head coach: Laurie Walquist (3–3); Gary Schmeelk (10–26)
- General manager: George Halas
- Owner(s): George Halas & Charles Bidwill
- Arena: Chicago Coliseum

Results
- Record: 13–29 (.310)
- Place: Conference: 7th (1st half); T–6th (2nd half)
- Playoff finish: Did not qualify

The 1926–27 Chicago Bruins season was both the Bruins' second season of existence as a professional franchise (after previously playing at least one season independently as a team) and the second season of existence for the American Basketball League, which was the first professional basketball league that had truly attempted to go fully national after previous professional basketball leagues were mostly regional at the time. For the second straight season in a row, the American Basketball League would start out their season with nine teams competing in the split season formatting, with the two half seasons being utilized instead of one whole season being utilized throughout the entire season (which would be the case throughout the majority of the league's existence in the first place). However, unlike the previous season of play, not only would the original Brooklyn Arcadians team (sometimes referred to as the Brooklyn Rockets) end up being replaced by the Original Celtics under the temporary distinction of the Brooklyn Celtics for this season only, but the Detroit Pulaski Post Five / Lions would end up folding operations after six straight losses to their season (and by extension, get their record officially stricken from the record books entirely), with the Philadelphia Quakers / Phillies team also later being replaced by the Philadelphia Sphas under the Philadelphia Warriors name that would inspire the future Golden State Warriors NBA team by the time the second half of the season began. Despite the early uncertainties involved at the time, the Bruins started the season out with an average 3–3 record in the first half of the season before head coach Laurie Walquist left the team to focus more on the Chicago Bears as a player in the National Football League, which left Gary Schmeelk as the new player-coach of the team for the rest of the season. Unfortunately for Schmeelk, the Bruins would perform poorly for not just the rest of the first half of the season by going 4–11 for the rest of that half for a 7–15 first half of the season that had them finishing only ahead of the Baltimore Orioles basketball team that half in terms of teams that actually their seasons properly, but also had them go 6–15 for a tied 6th place finish in the second half of the season with the Rochester Centrals that had both teams finish above Baltimore there in order to finish the season with a 13–29 record (with Schmeelk getting himself a 10–26 record for the majority of the games coached this season after Walquist got himself an average 3–3 record to start out this season). Because of that fact, the Bruins would easily fail to qualify for the ABL's playoff/championship series once again for the second straight season (which would just be a championship series held by the two best teams in each half-season from this specific ABL season played).

== Roster ==
Due to information on American Basketball League players being generally hard to find, there are bound to be more gaps and/or inaccuracies found in certain areas on the team's roster spots than usual.

| Player | Position |
|---|---|
| Moon Baker | G-F |
| Red Barak | F-C |
| Duke Dunne | G |
| Dutch Guenther | F-C |
| Mark Harper | C |
| Roddy Lamb | G |
| Ike Mahoney | G |
| Phil Rakov | G |
| Honey Russell | G-F |
| Sid Sankovic | F |
| Gary Schmeelk | F |
| Homer Stonebraker | F-C |
| Jack Tierney | G-F |
| Barney Varnes | F-C |
| Whitey Wickhorst | G-F |

== American Basketball League Standings ==
First Half
| Team | Wins | Losses | Winning % |
|---|---|---|---|
| Cleveland Rosenblums | 17 | 4 | .810 |
| Washington Palace Five / Laundrymen | 16 | 5 | .762 |
| Philadelphia Quakers / Phillies* | 14 | 7 | .667 |
| Brooklyn Arcadians/Brooklyn Celtics** | 13 | 8 | .619 |
| Fort Wayne Hoosiers | 8 | 13 | .381 |
| Rochester Centrals | 8 | 13 | .381 |
| Chicago Bruins | 7 | 14 | .333 |
| Baltimore Orioles | 1 | 20 | .048 |
| Detroit Pulaski Post Five / Pulaski / Lions† | 0 | 6 | .000 |

* – The Philadelphia Sphas would replace the Philadelphia Quakers during the second half of the season, albeit while playing under the original Philadelphia Warriors name instead of their typical Philadelphia SPHAs name.
** – After playing only in five total games this season (all of which ended in defeats), the Brooklyn Arcadians would have their franchise rights be both transferred and replaced by the Original Celtics franchise under the temporarily implemented name of the Brooklyn Celtics for the rest of this season in the ABL.
† – Withdrew from the ABL after playing only six total games during the first half of this season, with their games being stricken from the official league record books during this season.

Second Half
| Team | Wins | Losses | Winning % |
|---|---|---|---|
| Brooklyn Celtics* | 19 | 2 | .905 |
| Fort Wayne Hoosiers | 15 | 6 | .714 |
| Washington Palace Five / Laundrymen | 14 | 7 | .667 |
| Philadelphia Warriors** | 10 | 11 | .476 |
| Cleveland Rosenblums | 9 | 12 | .429 |
| Chicago Bruins | 6 | 15 | .286 |
| Rochester Centrals | 6 | 15 | .286 |
| Baltimore Orioles | 5 | 16 | .238 |

* – After playing only five total games this season (all of which ended in defeats), the Brooklyn Arcadians would have their franchise rights be both transferred and replaced by the Original Celtics franchise under the temporarily implemented name of the Brooklyn Celtics for the rest of this season in the ABL.
** – The Philadelphia Sphas would replace the Philadelphia Quakers during the second half of the season, albeit while playing under the original Philadelphia Warriors name instead of their typical Philadelphia SPHAs name.
