= 1930–31 Toledo Red Man Tobaccos season =

- League: American Basketball League (original)
- Head coach: Ed Cannon (2–10); Dutch Dehnert (10–14)
- General manager: Ed Cannon
- Owner(s): Pinkerton Tobacco; Red Man Tobacco
- Arena: The Field House (University of Toledo)

Results
- Record: 12–24 (.333)
- Place: Conference: 4th (1st half); 5th (2nd half)
- Playoff finish: Did not qualify

The 1930–31 Toledo Red Man Tobaccos season was the second professional basketball season played by the Red Man Tobaccos franchise (and their final professional season under that name) during what would be the final professional basketball season (and their only actual season) of (the original first iteration of) the American Basketball League, which was the first professional basketball league that had truly attempted to go fully national after previous professional basketball leagues were mostly regional at the time. After previously winning the only championship held for what was considered the original version of the National Professional Basketball League, the Red Man Tobaccos (sometimes shortened down to just being the Redmen) would end up defecting from the (original) NPBL into the American Basketball League in order to see how well they would do against the rest of the competition that would be within the rest of the United States of America (primarily within the Eastern area of the nation) at the time. However, due to their move from the NPBL into the ABL being delayed until August 1930 (likely due in part to the effects of the Great Depression), general manager (and head coach of the time) Ed Cannon would request the services of three different players from the ABL being a part of their Red Man Tobaccos team (which could potentially be seen as Cookie Cunningham from the defending ABL champion Cleveland Rosenblums returning to Toledo with Gil Ely from the Chicago Bruins and Bob Grody from the Brooklyn Visitations joining Cunningham as new players there) as a condition of joining the ABL and only joined after this demand was met due to Cannon feeling like his team would need those players on his team in order to be a competitive franchise against other ABL teams there, which caused hard feelings from the ABL's other owners, who felt that Cannon's intransigence had delayed the league's planned start for the season. In any case, Toledo's franchise would be one of seven teams competing in what would later become the original ABL's final season ever played, though the first half of the season would conclude with a dangerously low five teams competing for the rest of the season instead. Interestingly, despite Toledo essentially strongarming the rest of the ABL into trying to upend the rest of the competition on their ends, the Red Man Tobaccos would end up having a below-average record of 8–14 that had them finish ahead of only the consistently struggling Chicago Bruins in terms of surviving teams for an official fourth place finish there (with both the Cleveland Rosenblums and Paterson Crescents leaving the ABL with average records this season to unofficially give Toledo a sixth place finish). Interestingly, during the first half of the season, Ed Cannon would release everyone outside of Davey Banks due to the poor play from the team in the first half of the season and signed five players from the now-defunct Cleveland Rosenblums (John "Pete" Barry, player-coach Dutch Dehnert, Joe Lapchick, Dutch Shudtz, and Lou Spindell) in hopes of having a better second half of the season by comparison. Unfortunately for them, this kind of change from acquiring multiple players from the now-defunct two-time defending (and three-time overall) ABL champions would surprisingly lead to even worse results for Toledo instead of better results for them, as the Red Man Tobaccos would end the second half of the season with a dead last place result with a below-average 4–11 record to have an overall last place finish of 12–25 for the season. As such, the Toledo Red Man Tobaccos would easily fail to qualify to participate in what would technically be considered the final ABL playoffs (which usually involved a championship series only) ever held, with the ABL failing to return to compete for the 1931–32 season due to the long-term effects of the Great Depression (which included initial plans to have the 1931–32 hold 16 teams competing in an Eastern and Western Division for that season) catching up to the league (though it would eventually return a couple of years later in a revived, smaller format of sorts without the Toledo franchise included). At the same time, the Toledo Red Man Tobaccos would compete independently for the following season after this season before later competing in a different version of the National Professional Basketball League that can be considered a precursor to the National Basketball League that eventually merged with the Basketball Association of America to become the present-day National Basketball Association the season after that under the Toledo Crimson Coaches Tobaccos name (sometimes shortened down to the Toledo Crimson Coaches) for one season before later being independent once again before folding operations for good by 1935.

== Roster ==
Due to information on American Basketball League players being generally hard to find, there are bound to be more gaps and/or inaccuracies found in certain areas on the team's roster spots than usual.

1930–31 Toledo Red Man Tobaccos roster
Players

Pos.	No.	Player	Height	Weight	DOB	From
G/F		Davey Banks	5 ft 7 in (1.70 m)	155 lb (70 kg)	1901-01-04	No college
G/F		Pete Barry	5 ft 11 in (1.80 m)	170 lb (77 kg)	1896-11-16	No college
G/F		Red Brandes	5 ft 8 in (1.73 m)	155 lb (70 kg)	1902-10-24	Woodward Technical HS (OH)
C		Cookie Cunningham	6 ft 3 in (1.91 m)	215 lb (98 kg)	1905-02-04	Ohio State
G/F		Dutch Dehnert	6 ft 0 in (1.83 m)	185 lb (84 kg)	1898-04-05	No college
C		Gil Ely	6 ft 2 in (1.88 m)	175 lb (79 kg)	1898-09-27	Michigan
G/F		Ken Failing	6 ft 1 in (1.85 m)	225 lb (102 kg)	1906-07-04	Central Michigan
C		Chuck Gillium	6 ft 6 in (1.98 m)	220 lb (100 kg)	1905-05-02	Grove City College
G/F		Bob Grody	6 ft 2 in (1.88 m)	215 lb (98 kg)	1900-04-25	Hamilton College
G		Fred Jacobs	5 ft 10 in (1.78 m)	175 lb (79 kg)	1907-09-14	Woodward Technical HS (OH)
G/F		Pip Koehler	5 ft 10 in (1.78 m)	165 lb (75 kg)	1902-01-16	Penn State
C		Joe Lapchick	6 ft 5 in (1.96 m)	185 lb (84 kg)	1900-04-12	No college
G/F		Len Shepherd	6 ft 0 in (1.83 m)	175 lb (79 kg)	1914-09-25	No college
F		Dutch Shudtz	6 ft 0 in (1.83 m)	175 lb (79 kg)	1908-06-07	No college
F		Lou Spindell	5 ft 10 in (1.78 m)	175 lb (79 kg)	1908-12-16	CCNY

Coaches
Head coach

Ed Cannon
Dutch Dehnert

Legend
- (DP) Unsigned draft pick
- (FA) Free agent
- (S) Suspended
- Injured

== American Basketball League Standings ==
First Half
Team	Wins	Losses	Winning %
Brooklyn Visitations	14	7	.667
Fort Wayne Hoosiers	13	9	.591
Rochester Centrals	10	9	.526
Toledo Red Man Tobaccos	8	13	.381
Chicago Bruins	7	14	.333
Cleveland Rosenblums*	6	6	.500
Paterson Crescents**	9	9	.500

* – The two-time defending ABL champions (and three-time overall ABL champions) in the Cleveland Rosenblums would surprisingly end up dropping out of the league on December 8, 1930 due to the long-term effects of the Great Depression kicking in for them.
** – The (original) Paterson Crescents franchise would end up dropping out of the league near the end of the first half of the season on December 30, 1930.

Second Half
Team	Wins	Losses	Winning %
Fort Wayne Hoosiers	11	5	.688
Chicago Bruins	11	5	.688
Brooklyn Visitations	8	8	.500
Rochester Centrals	5	10	.333
Toledo Red Man Tobaccos	4	11	.274
