= 1925–26 Chicago Bruins season =

- League: American Basketball League (original)
- Head coach: Laurie Walquist
- General manager: George Halas
- Owner(s): George Halas & Charles Bidwill
- Arena: Chicago Coliseum

Results
- Record: 9–22 (.290)
- Place: Conference: T–6th (1st half); 7th (2nd half)
- Playoff finish: Did not qualify

The 1925–26 Chicago Bruins season was both the Bruins' first season of existence as a professional franchise (after previously playing at least one season independently as a team) and the first season of existence for the American Basketball League, which was the first professional basketball league that had truly attempted to go fully national after previous professional basketball leagues were mostly regional at the time. The American Basketball League's inaugural season would have nine teams competing in that season (while a tenth team in East Liverpool, Ohio was intended to join the Bruins and the other eight teams in question for this season, the East Liverpool team ultimately withdrew operations before the season even began properly with other failed locations that had submitted entries to start the ABL's inaugural season including Baltimore, Maryland (who eventually got their own team the following season); Milwaukee, Wisconsin; and two more locations in the state of Ohio via Columbus and Camden), though the ABL would compete in a split season format with two half seasons being utilized instead of one whole season being utilized throughout the season (which would be the case throughout the majority of the league's existence in the first place). However, by the time the first half of the season ended and the second half of the season began, the Boston Whirlwinds would be expelled from the ABL due to a dispute over player contracts, which led to the ABL entering the second half of the season with only eight teams remaining in their league this time around. In any case, the first season for the Bruins would end up being a poor one for them, as Chicago would end the first half of the season with a tied record for 6th place with a 6–10 record that had them be placed alongside the previously mentioned Boston Whirlwinds and Detroit Pulaski Post Five and be ahead of only the Buffalo Bisons, but finished the second half of their season with a 3–11 record for seventh place to be ahead of only the Detroit Pulaski Post Five in order to have an overall record of 9–22 for this season. Because of that fact, the Bruins would easily fail to qualify for the inaugural playoff/championship series held by this new professional basketball league this season (which would just be a championship series held by the two best teams in each half-season from this specific ABL season played).

== Roster ==
Due to information on American Basketball League players being generally hard to find, there are bound to be more gaps and/or inaccuracies found in certain areas on the team's roster spots than usual.

Player	Position
Red Barak	F-C
Hank Baude	G
Soup Campbell	G-F
Red Dever	G
Art Dexter	G-F
Duke Dunne	G
Carl Hartelius	G
Ike Mahoney	G
Stretch Miller	C
Lenny Sachs	G
Rosy Starn	F-C
Bill Theissen	G-F
Jack Tierney	G-F
Laurie Walquist	G
Whitey Wickhorst	G-F

== American Basketball League Standings ==
First Half
Team	Wins	Losses	Winning %
Brooklyn Arcadians	12	4	.750
Washington Palace Five / Laundrymen	11	5	.688
Cleveland Rosenblums	10	6	.625
Rochester Centrals	9	7	.562
Fort Wayne Caseys	7	9	.438
Chicago Bruins	6	10	.375
Detroit Pulaski Post Five	6	10	.375
Boston Whirlwinds^{×}	6	10	.375
Buffalo Bisons / Germans	5	11	.322

× – The Boston Whirlwinds were expelled by the end of the first half of the season due to a dispute over player contracts.

Second Half
Team	Wins	Losses	Winning %
Cleveland Rosenblums	13	1	.919
Washington Palace Five / Laundrymen	11	3	.786
Rochester Centrals	9	5	.643
Brooklyn Arcadians	7	7	.500
Fort Wayne Caseys	6	8	.429
Buffalo Bisons / Germans	5	9	.357
Chicago Bruins	3	11	.214
Detroit Pulaski Post Five	2	12	.143
