= 1929–30 Toledo Red Man Tobaccos season =

- League champions
- Conference champions
- League: National Professional Basketball League
- Head coach: Pip Koehler (player-coach)
- General manager: Ed Cannon
- Owner(s): Pinkerton Tobacco; Red Man Tobacco
- Arena: The Field House (University of Toledo)

Results
- Record: 17–3 (.850)
- Place: Conference: 1st (1st half); T–1st (2nd half)
- Playoff finish: NPBL Champions (Won 4–2 over Dayton Kellys)

The 1929–30 Toledo Red Man Tobaccos season was the first professional basketball season played by the Red Man Tobaccos franchise (sometimes shortened down to just being the Redmen) during what would be the first and only professional basketball season of (the first iteration of) the National Professional Basketball League. This rendition of the National Professional Basketball League would not be related to either the 1926 version of the National Basketball League (which was also a completely different league from the first ever professional basketball league known as the National Basket Ball League that was around at the end of the 19th century and the start of the 20th century) that hosted both the Original Celtics and the Brooklyn Visitations as teams there nor would it officially be related to the second version of the NPBL that the Toledo squad would technically be a part of, with that version of the NPBL later becoming a precursor to both the Midwest Basketball Conference and the National Basketball League (with the latter league eventually merging operations with the Basketball Association of America to become the present-day National Basketball Association), though there would be some outlets that would misconstrue the different leagues mentioned as being a part of the overall history for the NBL that eventually became a part of the NBA. In any case, the Toledo Red Man Tobaccos would be one of six teams that joined together to create this version of the NPBL (though most of the teams involved with this league would be based in the state of Ohio, with a few others being in Michigan instead), with the other teams including the Canton Generals (though it's suggested they also played as the Toledo Orphans as well) from Canton, Ohio; the Columbus Robert Lees (named after the infamous Confederate States of America general Robert E. Lee) from Columbus, Ohio; the Dayton Kellys from Dayton, Ohio; the Detroit Olympics from Detroit, Michigan; and the Pontiac Chiefs from Pontiac, Michigan (though by the second half of the season, the Detroit Olympics team would move to Jackson, Michigan to become the Jackson Elks and the Pontiac Chiefs team would move to Detroit itself to become the Detroit Tool Shops for the rest of that half of the season going forward instead). Throughout this entire season, Toledo would be one of the best teams in the NPBL, if not the very best team as a whole due to them not just being nearly undefeated throughout the first half of the season (being two games ahead of the team that originally was named the Detroit Olympics for that specific half of the season after only having one total loss throughout that half of the season), but also having an 8–2 record that was ultimately tied up with the Canton Generals and the Dayton Kellys (who had a miserably poor first half record by comparison to Toledo). Initially, the Red Man Tobaccos franchise would have a chance at being named the automatic champions of the NPBL by default if they would win the three-way tiebreaker series that also involved the Canton Generals (who might have been named the Canton Orphans by the second half of the season, if not the tiebreaker series) and the Dayton Kellys (who had an incredible turnaround from their poor performance in the first half of the season into the second half of the season). However, while Toledo would end up winning their first half against Canton, they ultimately failed to succeed at being the overall league champions by default when they lost their second half first place tiebreaker series match to Dayton in a close manner, meaning they were going to have to compete against the Dayton Kellys in what would be a rematch championship series for the overall league championship to earn it properly instead of winning it by default. At first, Toledo would surprisingly struggle with Dayton by losing the first two games of the series, but once the series went back to their home court in Toledo, the Red Man Tobaccos would end up reversing their fortunes for the rest of the championship series by not just winning their remaining games that would be played in Toledo, but also the last game played in Dayton to steal the championship series away from the Kellys with a 4–2 series victory. Following this season's conclusion, the Toledo Red Man Tobaccos would leave the National Professional Basketball League (which went defunct shortly after this season's conclusion) to compete in the American Basketball League in an attempt to prove their worth as a true professional franchise that would be up against the best of the best within the rest of the U.S.A. by comparison to what they had dealt with beforehand (although they would not realize they would enter in that league's original final season of competition by comparison to what they had envisioned with their initial scope in mind).

== Roster ==
Due to information on National Professional Basketball League players being generally hard to find, there are bound to be more gaps and/or inaccuracies found in certain areas on the team's roster spots than usual.

1929–30 Toledo Red Man Tobaccos roster
Players

Pos.	No.	Player	Height	Weight	DOB	From
G/F		Rollie Boldt	5 ft 11 in (1.80 m)	170 lb (77 kg)	1904-04-04	Woodward Technical HS (OH)
G/F		Red Brandes	5 ft 8 in (1.73 m)	155 lb (70 kg)	1902-10-24	Woodward Technical HS (OH)
C		Cookie Cunningham	6 ft 3 in (1.91 m)	215 lb (98 kg)	1905-02-04	Ohio State
C		Rich Deighan	6 ft 3 in (1.91 m)	200 lb (91 kg)	1900-02-03	No college
G		Fred Jacobs	5 ft 10 in (1.78 m)	175 lb (79 kg)	1907-09-14	Woodward Technical HS (OH)
G/F		Pip Koehler	5 ft 10 in (1.78 m)	165 lb (75 kg)	1902-01-16	Penn State
G/F		Len Shepherd	6 ft 0 in (1.83 m)	175 lb (79 kg)	1914-09-25	No college
G/F		Ollie Wiza	6 ft 1 in (1.85 m)	185 lb (84 kg)	1910-12-25	No college

Coaches
Head coach

Pip Koehler

Legend
- (DP) Unsigned draft pick
- (FA) Free agent
- (S) Suspended
- Injured

Note: Ollie Wiza would not be a part of the team's playoff roster for this season.

== NPBL Standings ==
First Half
Team	Wins	Losses	Winning %
Toledo Red Man Tobaccos	9	1	.900
Detroit Olympics*	7	3	.700
Canton Generals	4	6	.400
Columbus Robert Lees	4	6	.400
Pontiac Chiefs*	4	6	.400
Dayton Kellys	2	8	.200

* – Teams moved elsewhere and rebranded themselves after the end of the first half of the season on January 10, 1930, with the Detroit Olympics becoming the Jackson Elks and the Pontiac Chiefs becoming the Detroit Tool Shops going forward for the rest of the season.

Second Half
Team	Wins	Losses	Winning %
Dayton Kellys	8	2	.800
Toledo Red Man Tobaccos	8	2	.800
Canton Generals	8	2	.800
Columbus Robert Lees	2	7	.222
Detroit Tool Shops*	1	7	.500
Pontiac Elks*	0	7	.000

* – Teams moved elsewhere and rebranded themselves before the start of the second half of the season on January 10, 1930, with the Detroit Olympics becoming the Jackson Elks and the Pontiac Chiefs becoming the Detroit Tool Shops going forward for the rest of the season.

== NPBL Playoffs ==
=== NPBL Second Half First Place Tiebreaker Series ===
Due to the way the second half of this season played out within the (original) NPBL, the Toledo Red Man Tobaccos would compete in a three-way series that involved both the Canton Generals (who might have also played as the Canton Orphans by this point in time) and the Dayton Kellys (who had an incredible turn around performance from the first half of the season to the second half of the season), with the Toledo squad potentially being declared champions of this version of the NPBL by default if they end up winning their scheduled games in this tiebreaker series. Unfortunately for the Red Man Tobaccos squad, while they would end up winning their match over Canton with a decisive 25–14 home victory, the Toledo squad would end up losing a close 26–24 road match to the Dayton Kellys, meaning the Dayton squad would officially be named the league's champions for the second half of the season instead. As such, Toledo would end up having to deal with a rematch championship series with Dayton in a best-of-seven championship series instead of being declared automatic champions of the NPBL by default had they outright won their tiebreaker series.

- Game 1 @ Toledo: Toledo Red Man Tobaccos 25, Canton Generals/Orphans 14
- Game 2 @ Dayton: Dayton Kellys 26, Toledo Red Man Tobaccos 24

Dayton Kellys won the second half of the regular split season over both the Toledo Red Man Tobaccos and the Canton Generals / Orphans.

=== NPBL Championship Series ===
Due to the previous results in the second half first place tiebreaker series, the best-of-seven championship series between the Toledo Red Man Tobaccos and the Dayton Kellys would end up being a rematch of the final game played in that second half tiebreaker series to determine the overall league champions instead of having Toledo being declared champions by default due to them winning both halves for the overall season due to the split season formatting at hand.

Toledo Red Man Tobaccos (1st Half Champions) Vs. Dayton Kellys (2nd Half Tiebreaker Champions): Toledo Red Man Tobaccos win series 4–2

- Game 1 @ Dayton: Dayton Kellys 19, Toledo Red Man Tobaccos 17
- Game 2 @ Dayton: Dayton Kellys 22, Toledo Red Man Tobaccos 21
- Game 3 @ Toledo: Toledo Red Man Tobaccos 27, Dayton Kellys 17
- Game 4 @ Toledo: Toledo Red Man Tobaccos 28, Dayton Kellys 18
- Game 5 @ Toledo: Toledo Red Man Tobaccos 21, Dayton Kellys 17
- Game 6 @ Dayton: Toledo Red Man Tobaccos 24, Dayton Kellys 19
