= 1928–29 Rochester Centrals season =

- League: American Basketball League (original)
- Head coach: Nick Harvey (11–17); John Murphy (7–5)
- General manager: Jack Neiman(?)
- Owner(s): Eddie Schlegal; Edward Miller; Johnny Murphy
- Arena: Naval Militia Armory

Results
- Record: 18–22 (.450)
- Place: Conference: 7th (1st half); 4th (2nd half)
- Playoff finish: Did not qualify

The 1928–29 Rochester Centrals season was both the Centrals' fourth season of existence as a professional franchise in the city of Rochester, New York and the fourth season of existence for the American Basketball League, which was the first professional basketball league that had truly attempted to go fully national after previous professional basketball leagues were mostly regional at the time. During the offseason, the ABL had entered a crossroads of sorts where the league's popularity was considered to be rather high, but it came at the cost of the Original Celtics dominating the rest of the competition and risked ending the rest of the league due to games featuring the Original Celtics (usually) showcasing high attendance values upon road matches (to the point where some crowds would chant "Break up the Celtics!"), but often displaying poor attendance values for the rest of the games in the league by comparison (to the point where only five teams looked certain to enter this season originally). Not only that, but the Celtics' own team owner, Jim Furey, would have to go to prison during this upcoming season due to him embezzling $187,000 from a company he worked with in his spare time called the Arnold Constable Corporation. This combination of factors alongside the change of league presidents from NFL president Joseph Carr to former Interstate Basketball League and Metropolitan Basketball League creator and president, Naismith Basketball Hall of Famer John J. O'Brien, led to the ABL accepting the wishes of both the fans and other league owners in breaking up the Original Celtics (and having them replaced by the New York Hakoahs for this season by extension) in order to help bolster other ABL teams up for plans of long-term success going forward. Originally, the plan was for John "Pete" Barry and Dutch Dehnert going to the Centrals, Joe Lapchick going to the Cleveland Rosenblums, John Beckman going to what was to be a planned expansion team within the city of Baltimore at the time, and Davey Banks and Nat Holman taking part in the new team representing the state of New York as the replacement team for the Original Celtics in the New York Hakoahs. However, due to a combination of John "Pete" Barry and Dutch Dehnert failing to come to terms with Rochester, the Baltimore expansion team folding operations before the ABL's season even began, and an eventual trade with the Rosenblums by involving the Centrals and John Beckman (who went to Rochester instead of Baltimore), the diversion of the majority of the Celtics' players ended up falling apart and the players that weren't on the Hakoahs went to the Rosenblums instead (although Cleveland would end up selling off Nat Hickey to the Chicago Bruins under the ABL's discretion in order to avoid another case of fan ennui along the way).

Entering this season properly, the Centrals would end up being one of eight ABL teams competing in the league this season, with this season being the most stable of the league's entire history (at least in terms of its original existence), despite a ninth planned team in the city of Baltimore folding operations before the season even began properly. During the first half of the season, Rochester would continue performing very poorly as a franchise for what would look like a third straight season in a row, as they would end up getting a below-average 11–15 record that would only have them finish ahead of the newly added Paterson Whirlwinds that were previously from the Metropolitan Basketball League at one point in time for a seventh place finish in that half of the season. Luckily for Rochester, they would perform a fair bit better for the second half of the season by comparison to what they were doing for the first half of the season, despite them trading away John Beckman to the Cleveland Rosenblums earlier in the first half of the season. However, the Centrals would end up finishing the second half of the season with an average 7–7 record for a much better fourth place finish instead, with their placement being behind only a tied second place battle between the aforementioned Cleveland Rosenblums and the former Metropolitan Basketball League team known as the Brooklyn Visitations alongside the first place Fort Wayne Hoosiers. While Rochester would end up having a better finish to their overall season than they had started the season earlier on, the Centrals ultimately would fail to make it to the ABL championship series due to Rochester failing to finish in first place for either half of the season yet again.

== Roster ==
Due to information on American Basketball League players being generally hard to find, there are bound to be more gaps and/or inaccuracies found in certain areas on the team's roster spots than usual.

Player	Position
Babe Artus	G/F
Phil Barlow	C
Marty Barry	G/F
John Beckman	F
Chuck Gillium	C
Bob Grody	G/F
Joe Kellmurray	G
Lefty Kintzing	G/F
Dip Murray	G/F
Mount Norris	G
Buck Pierson	G/F
Lou Rabin	G/F
Honey Russell	G/F
Tony Schiffer	G/F
Bill Uhlen	G/F

== American Basketball League Standings ==
First Half
Team	Wins	Losses	Winning %
Cleveland Rosenblums	19	9	.679
Fort Wayne Hoosiers	18	10	.643
Brooklyn Visitations	15	12	.556
Chicago Bruins	15	12	.556
New York Hakoahs	13	16	.448
Trenton (Royal) Bengals	12	16	.429
Rochester Centrals	11	15	.423
Paterson Whirlwinds	6	19	.240

Second Half
Team	Wins	Losses	Winning %
Fort Wayne Hoosiers	11	3	.786
Cleveland Rosenblums	10	4	.714
Brooklyn Visitations	10	4	.714
Rochester Centrals	7	7	.500
New York Hakoahs	5	9	.357
Trenton (Royal) Bengals	4	8	.333
Chicago Bruins	4	10	.286
Paterson Whirlwinds	3	9	.250
