= 1929–30 Rochester Centrals season =

- League: American Basketball League (original)
- Head coach: Pop Morgenweck
- General manager: Jack Neiman(?)
- Owner(s): Eddie Schlegal; Edward Miller; Johnny Murphy
- Arena: Naval Militia Armory

Results
- Record: 31–21 (.596)
- Place: Conference: 3rd (1st half); 1st (2nd half)
- Playoff finish: Lost ABL championship series 1–4 to the Cleveland Rosenblums

The 1929–30 Rochester Centrals season was both the Centrals' fifth season of existence as a professional franchise in the city of Rochester, New York and the fifth season of existence for the American Basketball League, which was the first professional basketball league that had truly attempted to go fully national after previous professional basketball leagues were mostly regional at the time. For the fourth time in five seasons, the American Basketball League would utilize the split season formatting, though similar to the previous ABL season, the American Basketball League would have eight teams competing within the two half seasons that were being utilized here instead of the one whole season that was being was the season before that one. However, unlike that previous season, this season would see not just one, but two different teams drop out of the ABL entirely, with the New York (Original) Celtics basically being a shell of their former selves by this point in time and later having their average 5–5 record be stricken from the record books by the end of the season after dropping out of the league by December 19, 1929, while the Syracuse All-Americans fared even worse than them by comparison, to the point where they ended up forfeiting their final four games scheduled in the first half of the season after officially dropping out of the season themselves on January 6, 1930. During the first half of the season, the Centrals would end up having their first winning performance in the ABL since the league's inaugural season, as Rochester would have an above-average 14–10 record for that half of the season that had them finishing in third place behind only the Brooklyn Visitations and the defending champion Cleveland Rosenblums. However, the second half of the season would be even better for them, as Rochester would end up having an above-average 19–11 record to finish one game ahead of the defending champion Rosenblums to be named the second half champions with a first place finish there. This surprising surge on the Centrals' end would result in them qualifying in the ABL championship series against the defending champion Cleveland Rosenblums, the first half champions of the season, in a best-of-seven series. While Rochester would end up upsetting the Rosenblums in the first game of the series, Cleveland would end up winning the next four games afterward to win the series 4–1 to repeat as ABL champions over the Centrals.

== Roster ==
Due to information on American Basketball League players being generally hard to find, there are bound to be more gaps and/or inaccuracies found in certain areas on the team's roster spots than usual.

Player	Position
Tommy Allen	F/C
Babe Artus	G/F
Marty Barry	G/F
Joe Brown	G
Gaza Chizmadia	G/F
Tiny Hearn	C
Manny Hirsch	G/F
Lefty Kintzing	G/F
Lou Rabin	G/F
Lefty Topel	G

Note: Marty Barry, Joe Brown, and Lefty Topel would not be a part of the team's roster by the time they entered the ABL championship series.

== American Basketball League Standings ==
First Half
Team	Wins	Losses	Winning %
Cleveland Rosenblums	17	7	.738
Brooklyn Visitations	15	9	.625
Rochester Centrals	14	10	.583
Chicago Bruins	12	12	.500
Fort Wayne Hoosiers	12	12	.500
Paterson Crescents	10	14	.417
New York (Original) Celtics†*	5	5	.500
Syracuse All-Americans†	4	20	.167

† – Withdrew from the ABL before the first half of the season officially ended, with the New York (Original) Celtics dropping out of the league on December 19, 1929 and the Syracuse All-Americans dropping out of the ABL (and forfeiting their final four games of the first half of the season by default) on January 6, 1930 near the end of the first half of the season.
* – Withdrew from the ABL after playing only ten total games during the first half of this season, with their games being stricken from the official league record books during this season despite having an average record this season.

Second Half
Team	Wins	Losses	Winning %
Rochester Centrals	19	11	.633
Cleveland Rosenblums	18	12	.600
Chicago Bruins	17	13	.567
Brooklyn Visitations	15	15	.500
Fort Wayne Hoosiers	13	17	.433
Paterson Crescents	8	22	.267

== American Basketball League Championship Series ==
Cleveland Rosenblums (1st Half Champions) Vs. Rochester Centrals (2nd Half Champions): Cleveland Rosenblums win series 4–1

- Game 1: March 20, 1930 @ Rochester: Rochester Centrals 20, Cleveland Rosenblums 16
- Game 2: March 21, 1930 @ Cleveland: Cleveland Rosenblums 18, Rochester Centrals 17
- Game 3: March 22, 1930 @ Rochester: Cleveland Rosenblums 18, Rochester Centrals 13
- Game 4: March 23, 1930 @ Cleveland: Cleveland Rosenblums 23, Rochester Centrals 16
- Game 5: March 24, 1930 @ Cleveland: Cleveland Rosenblums 21, Rochester Centrals 15
