= 1930–31 Rochester Centrals season =

- League: American Basketball League (original)
- Head coach: Jack Neiman & John Murphy
- General manager: Jack Neiman
- Owner(s): Eddie Schlegal; Edward Miller; Johnny Murphy
- Arena: Naval Militia Armory

Results
- Record: 15–19 (.441)
- Place: Conference: 3rd (1st half); 4th (2nd half)
- Playoff finish: Did not qualify

The 1930–31 Rochester Centrals season was both the Centrals' sixth season of existence as a professional franchise (most likely speaking, anyway) in the city of Rochester, New York and the sixth and final season of existence for the original American Basketball League, which was the first professional basketball league that had truly attempted to go fully national after previous professional basketball leagues were mostly regional at the time. For the fifth and final time in the six original seasons that the ABL first had within that original era of existence, the American Basketball League would utilize the split season formatting, though unlike their other seasons of existence, they would only see seven teams competing in the two half seasons being utilized this time around instead of eight or nine teams with one whole season being utilized throughout that entire period of time (which would be the case throughout the majority of the league's existence in the first place). Worse yet for the ABL, similar to the previous season, two teams in the first half of the season would end up dropping out of the season with average records on their ends, with the long-standing, champion favorite Cleveland Rosenblums dropping out of the ABL by December 8, 1930 with a 6–6 record and the (original) Paterson Crescents dropping out of the ABL on December 30, 1930 with a 9–9 record. Despite the dangerous worries at hand with the season potentially not even completing itself properly at times, the Centrals would still complete the first half of the season with a barely above-average 10–9 record to have a third place finish behind that of the Fort Wayne Hoosiers and the Brooklyn Visitations for that half of the season. As for the second half of the season, Rochester would end up disappointing fans with a more anticlimactic 5–10 record for a fourth place finish that had them only be one game ahead of the newly added Toledo Red Man Tobaccos from the formerly existing National Professional Basketball League to avoid last place entirely for the end of the season. Due to the disappointing finish for the season, the Rochester Centrals would fail to qualify for the final ABL championship series held in the original league's existence before it suspended operations for two seasons due to the Great Depression before it ended up getting revived in a more regional point of view in 1933. As for the Centrals franchise in question, they never ended up becoming a professional franchise ever again officially, though there is a suggested possibility that the Rochester Centrals might have had some ties to the Rochester Seagrams franchise that eventually became the Sacramento Kings of the present-day National Basketball Association (potentially by a merger with the two teams where the Seagrams got the longer-lasting rights at hand?); if that point is actually true, then this franchise would technically be considered the longest-lasting professional basketball franchise by association.

== Roster ==
Due to information on American Basketball League players being generally hard to find, there are bound to be more gaps and/or inaccuracies found in certain areas on the team's roster spots than usual.

Player	Position
Tommy Allen	F/C
Phil Barlow	C
Marty Barry	G/F
Gaza Chizmadia	G/F
Tiny Hearn	C
Manny Hirsch	G/F
Lefty Kintzing	G/F
Hash McNeil	G
Buck Pierson	G/F
Lou Rabin	G/F
Sam Siegel	G/F
Lefty Topel	G
Bill Uhlen	G/F

== American Basketball League Standings ==
First Half
Team	Wins	Losses	Winning %
Brooklyn Visitations	14	7	.667
Fort Wayne Hoosiers	13	9	.591
Rochester Centrals	10	9	.526
Toledo Red Man Tobaccos	8	13	.381
Chicago Bruins	7	14	.333
Cleveland Rosenblums*	6	6	.500
Paterson Crescents**	9	9	.500

* – The two-time defending ABL champions (and three-time overall ABL champions) in the Cleveland Rosenblums would surprisingly end up dropping out of the league on December 8, 1930 due to the long-term effects of the Great Depression kicking in for them.
** – The (original) Paterson Crescents franchise would end up dropping out of the league near the end of the first half of the season on December 30, 1930.

Second Half
Team	Wins	Losses	Winning %
Fort Wayne Hoosiers	11	5	.688
Chicago Bruins	11	5	.688
Brooklyn Visitations	8	8	.500
Rochester Centrals	5	10	.333
Toledo Red Man Tobaccos	4	11	.274
