= 1927–28 Chicago Bruins season =

- League: American Basketball League (original)
- Head coach: Honey Russell
- General manager: George Halas
- Owner(s): George Halas & Charles Bidwill
- Arena: Chicago Coliseum

Results
- Record: 13–36 (.265)
- Place: Division: 3rd (Western)
- Playoff finish: Did not qualify

The 1927–28 Chicago Bruins season was both the Bruins' third season of existence as a professional franchise (after previously playing at least one season independently as a team) and the third season of existence for the American Basketball League, which was the first professional basketball league that had truly attempted to go fully national after previous professional basketball leagues were mostly regional at the time. For the first season ever in the league's history (and the only time in its inaugural period of existence), the ABL would abandon its split season formatting to have one whole regular season of play, with the eight teams there competing in two divisions of four teams each (with Chicago competing in the Western Division, while teams such as the Original Celtics (labeled as the New York (Original) Celtics during this season) and the Philadelphia Warriors competed in the Eastern Division this season). While the Eastern Division was described as something more like a bloodbath to those that had witnessed the season at hand (to the point where the Washington Palace Five (/ Laundrymen) team would end up having their franchise rights be moved out and swapped around with the Brooklyn Visitations by what would unofficially be considered the start of the second half of the season on January 3, 1928 until the end of that franchise's existence (pretty much)), the Western Division was seen as more like a joke who’s two best teams were already decided by the halfway point of the season due to the Detroit Cardinals / Olympians folding operations on January 3, 1928 as well following a doubleheader series victory they had, as well as the Chicago Bruins holding the worst record of the surviving teams left in the Western Division throughout this season. Despite having future Boston Celtics head coach Honey Russell leading the team as a player-coach this season, the Bruins would end up having the worst record out of all the surviving teams this season with a 13–39 record, easily failing to qualify for the ABL's new playoff format involving the two best teams in each division competing against each other in a best-of-three series before the remaining teams went against each other in a best-of-five championship series.

== Roster ==
Due to information on American Basketball League players being generally hard to find, there are bound to be more gaps and/or inaccuracies found in certain areas on the team's roster spots than usual.

Player	Position
Red Barak	F-C
John Beckman	G-F
Bill Brown	G
Swede Grimstead	F-C
Mark Harper	C
Dutch Krizenecky	F-C
Ike Mahoney	G
Steve Olszewski	G
Honey Russell	G-F
Slim Shoun	C
Homer Stonebraker	F-C
Jerry Sullivan	G-F
Jack Tierney	G-F
Tillie Voss	F-C
Whitey Wickhorst	G-F

There would also be a player with the last name of Clancy that was also on the team for a game on December 8, 1927 up against the Philadelphia Warriors.

== American Basketball League Standings ==
=== Eastern Division ===
Eastern Division
Team	Wins	Losses	Winning %
New York (Original) Celtics	40	9	.816
Philadelphia Warriors	30	21	.588
Washington Palace Five (/ Laundrymen) / Brooklyn Visitations*	25	26	.490
Rochester Centrals	24	28	.462

* – The Washington Palace Five / Laundrymen franchise would have their franchise rights and record be transferred out to the Brooklyn Visitations by January 3, 1928 for the unofficial second half of the season.

=== Western Division ===
Western Division
Team	Wins	Losses	Winning %
Fort Wayne Hoosiers	27	24	.529
Cleveland Rosenblums	22	29	.431
Chicago Bruins	13	36	.265
Detroit Cardinals / Olympians†	5	13	.278

† – Withdrew from the ABL on January 3, 1928 by the start of the unofficial second half of the season.
