= 1929–30 Syracuse All-Americans season =

- League: American Basketball League (original)
- Head coach: Teddy Kearns (player-coach)
- General manager: Vic Hanson
- Owner(s): Vic Hanson(?)
- Arena: West Jefferson Street Armory

Results
- Record: 4–20 (.167)
- Place: Conference: N/A (Officially 7th (1st half))
- Playoff finish: Did not qualify (Dropped out of the ABL during the first half of the season.)

The 1929–30 Syracuse All-Americans season was the first and only season of professional play for the All-Americans franchise in the city of Syracuse, New York under the fifth (and penultimate) season of what would be the original version of the American Basketball League, which was the first professional basketball league that had truly attempted to go fully national after previous professional basketball leagues were mostly regional at the time. Syracuse's inclusion in the league was held to be as a replacement of the Trenton (Royal) Bengals franchise that had previously played in the ABL in its previous season before leaving the league for this season for reasons currently not known (though it's suggested to be related to financial issues due to the Great Depression coming into effect pretty soon). In any case, for the fourth time in five seasons, the American Basketball League would utilize the split season formatting, though similar to the previous ABL season, the American Basketball League would have eight teams competing within the two half seasons that were being utilized here instead of the one whole season that was being was the season before that one. However, unlike that previous season, this season would see not just one, but two different teams drop out of the ABL entirely, as the New York (Original) Celtics first dropped out of the league (and later had their average 5–5 record stricken out of the ABL's official record books for this season) due to the famed Original Celtics squad essentially being a shell of its former glory after being broken apart from the previous season of inactivity due to team owner Jim Furey going to prison for embezzlement, followed by Syracuse dropping out of the league near the end of the first half of the season on January 6, 1930. Interestingly, because the Syracuse All-Americans franchise decided to only exit out of the league near the end of the first half of the season instead of during an awkward point of time in the first half of the season, the ABL decided to let the All-Americans have their placement in the ABL stick for the first half of the season, but ultimately decided to place forfeitures in the final four games of the first half of the season in mind for them due to their sudden decision to leave the ABL on their ends. As such, the Syracuse All-Americans would finish the first half of the season with a poor 4–20 record to their season (including the four forfeited losses to conclude their season in the ABL), with them not being able to participate in the second half of the ABL following their sudden decision to leave the ABL entirely near the start of January 1930.

== Roster ==
Due to information on American Basketball League players being generally hard to find, there are bound to be more gaps and/or inaccuracies found in certain areas on the team's roster spots than usual.

Player	Position
Tommy Allen	F/C
Tom Barlow	G
Marty Barry	G/F
Gotch Carr	G/F
Chuck Gillium	C
Nat Holman	G/F
Teddy Kearns	G/F
Stretch Meehan	C
Dick Page	C
Buck Pierson	G/F
Willie Roach	G/F
Tony Schiffer	G/F
Jerry Sullivan	G/F
Freddie Wesslock	G/F
Ed Wineapple	F/C

== American Basketball League Standings ==
First Half
Team	Wins	Losses	Winning %
Cleveland Rosenblums	17	7	.738
Brooklyn Visitations	15	9	.625
Rochester Centrals	14	10	.583
Fort Wayne Hoosiers	12	12	.500
Chicago Bruins	12	12	.500
Paterson Crescents	10	14	.417
New York (Original) Celtics†*	5	5	.500
Syracuse All-Americans†	4	20	.167

† – Withdrew from the ABL before the first half of the season officially ended, with the New York (Original) Celtics dropping out of the league on December 19, 1929 and the Syracuse All-Americans dropping out of the ABL (and forfeiting their final four games of the first half of the season by default) on January 6, 1930 near the end of the first half of the season.
* – Withdrew from the ABL after playing only ten total games during the first half of this season, with their games being stricken from the official league record books during this season despite having an average record this season.

Second Half
Team	Wins	Losses	Winning %
Rochester Centrals	19	11	.633
Cleveland Rosenblums	18	12	.600
Chicago Bruins	17	13	.567
Brooklyn Visitations	15	15	.500
Fort Wayne Hoosiers	13	17	.433
Paterson Crescents	8	22	.267
