= 1925–26 Rochester Centrals season =

- League: American Basketball League (original)
- Head coach: John Murphy (player-coach)
- General manager: Jack Neiman
- Owner(s): Jack Neiman
- Arena: Naval Militia Armory

Results
- Record: 18–12 (.600)
- Place: Conference: 4th (1st half); 3rd (2nd half)
- Playoff finish: Did not qualify

The 1925–26 Rochester Centrals season was both the Centrals' first season of existence as a professional franchise in the city of Rochester, New York and the first season of existence for the American Basketball League, which was the first professional basketball league that had truly attempted to go fully national after previous professional basketball leagues were mostly regional at the time. The American Basketball League's inaugural season would have nine teams competing in that season (while a tenth team in East Liverpool, Ohio was intended to join the Centrals and the other eight teams in question for this season, the East Liverpool team ultimately withdrew operations before the season even began properly, with other failed locations that had submitted entries to start the ABL's inaugural season including Baltimore, Maryland (who eventually got their own team the following season); Milwaukee, Wisconsin; and two more locations in the state of Ohio via Columbus and Camden), though the ABL would compete in a split season format with two half seasons being utilized instead of one whole season being utilized throughout the season (which would be the case throughout the majority of the league's existence in the first place). However, by the time the first half of the season ended and the second half of the season began, the Boston Whirlwinds would be expelled from the ABL due to a dispute over player contracts, which led to the ABL entering the second half of the season with only eight teams remaining in their league this time around. In any case, the first season for the Centrals would look to be an above-average one, at least on the surface level. The first half of the season would see the Rochester franchise barely get themselves an above-average record of 9–7, which would be good enough for a fourth place finish to be behind that of the Cleveland Rosenblums, the Washington Palace Five team, and the Brooklyn Arcadians. As for the second half of the season, the Centrals would generally see themselves perform around the same way as they had done in the first half of the season, with Rochester having an even better 9–5 record for a third place finish to only behind that of the Washington Palace Five and the nearly undefeated Cleveland Rosenblums. Unfortunately, due to the way the split season formatting worked for the ABL's season, the Centrals would ultimately fail to qualify for any sort of playoff competition in the process, which was just a championship series between the two best teams of each half-season at this point in time (which were the Brooklyn Arcadians and the Cleveland Rosenblums).

== Roster ==
Due to information on American Basketball League players being generally hard to find, there are bound to be more gaps and/or inaccuracies found in certain areas on the team's roster spots than usual.

Player	Position
Phil Barlow	C
Marty Barry	G/F
Jim Cullen	C
Manny Hirsch	G/F
Trixie Messinger	G/F
Mike Mumby	G/F
John Murphy	G
Lou Rabin	G/F
Allie Schmitt	G/F
Sam Siegel	G/F
Lefty Topel	G
Bill Uhlen	G/F
Tillie Voss	C

Note: In addition to all of these players, there was also an unknown guard with the last name of Trottley that briefly was on the team as well.

== American Basketball League Standings ==
First Half
Team	Wins	Losses	Winning %
Brooklyn Arcadians	12	4	.750
Washington Palace Five / Laundrymen	11	5	.688
Cleveland Rosenblums	10	6	.625
Rochester Centrals	9	7	.562
Fort Wayne Caseys	7	9	.438
Chicago Bruins	6	10	.375
Detroit Pulaski Post Five	6	10	.375
Boston Whirlwinds^{×}	6	10	.375
Buffalo Bisons / Germans	5	11	.322

× – The Boston Whirlwinds were expelled by the end of the first half of the season due to a dispute over player contracts.

Second Half
Team	Wins	Losses	Winning %
Cleveland Rosenblums	13	1	.919
Washington Palace Five / Laundrymen	11	3	.786
Rochester Centrals	9	5	.643
Brooklyn Arcadians	7	7	.500
Fort Wayne Caseys	6	8	.429
Buffalo Bisons / Germans	5	9	.357
Chicago Bruins	3	11	.214
Detroit Pulaski Post Five	2	12	.143
