= 1930–31 Chicago Bruins season =

- League: American Basketball League (original)
- Head coach: Pop Morgenweck
- General manager: George Halas
- Owner(s): George Halas & Charles Bidwill
- Arena: Chicago Coliseum

Results
- Record: 18–19 (.486)
- Place: Conference: 5th (1st half); T–1st (2nd half)
- Playoff finish: Did not qualify (Lost second half first place tiebreaker to Fort Wayne Hoosiers)

The 1930–31 Chicago Bruins season was both the Bruins' sixth season of existence as a professional franchise (after previously playing at least one season independently as a team) and the sixth and final season of existence for the original iteration of the American Basketball League, which was the first professional basketball league that had truly attempted to go fully national after previous professional basketball leagues were mostly regional at the time. For the fifth and final time in the six original seasons that the ABL first had within that original era of existence, the American Basketball League would utilize the split season formatting, though unlike their other seasons of existence, they would only see seven teams competing in the two half seasons being utilized this time around instead of eight or nine teams with one whole season being utilized throughout that entire period of time (which would be the case throughout the majority of the league's existence in the first place). Worse yet for the ABL, similar to the previous season, two teams in the first half of the season would end up dropping out of the season with average records on their ends, with the long-standing, champion favorite Cleveland Rosenblums dropping out of the ABL by December 8, 1930 with a 6–6 record and the (original) Paterson Crescents dropping out of the ABL on December 30, 1930 with a 9–9 record. For the first half of their final season in the ABL under new head coach Pop Morgenweck, the Bruins looked like they would have yet another disappointing season with a 7–14 record for a last place finish in terms of teams that actually completed their regular seasons this time around. However, once they entered the second half of the season, the Bruins had felt like a completely different team by comparison to how they performed back in the first half of the season, to the point where they ended up tying the Fort Wayne Hoosiers with a first place finish through an 11–5 record to tie as the best team in the league for that half of the season. Unfortunately, due to the ABL only allowing for one team to qualify for each spot in their playoff formatting (which would just be a championship round in this case), the ABL would utilize an impromptu best-of-three first place tiebreaker series between the Bruins and the Hoosiers to see which team would earn their chance at being named the final (original) league champions for the ABL against the Brooklyn Visitations. With the Bruins, they would unfortunately revert back to the typical poor play that had previously defined their standings within their history in the ABL in the tiebreaker series, as they would lose their two games in low-scoring affairs through 25–11 and 20–16 defeats resulting in their final elimination in the ABL. Following this season's conclusion, the ABL would temporarily remain dormant due to the long-term effects of the Great Depression until 1933 despite initially planning to have the 1931–32 hold 16 teams competing in an Eastern and Western Division for that season (though they'd return under a smaller, more regional scope by comparison to their initial national scope they had in mind when first creating the ABL back in 1925 due, in part, to the consequences of the Great Depression in question), while the Bruins decided to remain dormant and not return to the ABL upon its return in 1933, instead deciding to bide its sweet time to return as a professional franchise for the eventual rivaling National Basketball League by the 1939–40 NBL season.

== Roster ==
Due to information on American Basketball League players being generally hard to find, there are bound to be more gaps and/or inaccuracies found in certain areas on the team's roster spots than usual.

Player	Position
Tommy Allen	F-C
Red Barak	F-C
Bennie Borgmann	G
Art Bramhall	G-F
Gil Ely	G-F
Chuck Gillium	C
Pat Herlihy	C
Nat Hickey	G-F
Ray Kennedy	G
Lefty Kintzing	G-F
Ralph Miller	G
Charlie "Feed" Murphy	F-C
Buck Pierson	G
Red Skurnick	G
Whitey Wickhorst	G-F

== American Basketball League Standings ==
First Half
Team	Wins	Losses	Winning %
Brooklyn Visitations	14	7	.667
Fort Wayne Hoosiers	13	9	.591
Rochester Centrals	10	9	.526
Toledo Red Man Tobaccos	8	13	.381
Chicago Bruins	7	14	.333
Cleveland Rosenblums*	6	6	.500
Paterson Crescents**	9	9	.500

* – The two-time defending ABL champions (and three-time overall ABL champions) in the Cleveland Rosenblums would surprisingly end up dropping out of the league on December 8, 1930 due to the long-term effects of the Great Depression kicking in for them.
** – The (original) Paterson Crescents franchise would end up dropping out of the league near the end of the first half of the season on December 30, 1930.

Second Half
Team	Wins	Losses	Winning %
Fort Wayne Hoosiers	11	5	.688
Chicago Bruins	11	5	.688
Brooklyn Visitations	8	8	.500
Rochester Centrals	5	10	.333
Toledo Red Man Tobaccos	4	11	.274

== ABL Playoffs ==
=== ABL Second Half First Place Tiebreaker Series ===
Both the Chicago Bruins and the Fort Wayne Hoosiers would compete in a best-of-three series, with the winning team in this series being able to automatically qualify for the ABL's championship series as the second half first place team competing against the first half first place team this season, the Brooklyn Visitations. Unfortunately for the Bruins, they would be swept by the Hoosiers and fail to qualify for the championship series, which would be the official playoffs for the ABL properly during their existence in that league.

- Game 1: February 28, 1931 @ Chicago: Fort Wayne 25, Chicago 11
- Game 2: March 1, 1931 @ Fort Wayne: Fort Wayne 20, Chicago 16

== Awards and honors ==
By the end of the season, Bennie Borgmann would end up being the leading scorer of the entire league for the third straight season in a row in its sixth and final season of its original existence with 290 points scored for an average of 8.8 points per game. As of 2026, Borgmann remains the only leading scorer in the original ABL's history to enter the Naismith Basketball Hall of Fame due to his entry in 1961, with Bobby McDermott in the league's revived history years later joining him as the only other leading scorer in league history to enter the Hall of Fame alongside him.
