= 1926–27 Rochester Centrals season =

- League: American Basketball League (original)
- Head coach: John Murphy (player-coach)
- General manager: Jack Neiman
- Owner(s): Jack Neiman
- Arena: Naval Militia Armory

Results
- Record: 18–12 (.600)
- Place: Conference: T–5th (1st half); T–6th (2nd half)
- Playoff finish: Did not qualify

The 1926–27 Rochester Centrals season was both the Centrals' second season of existence as a professional franchise in the city of Rochester, New York and the second season of existence for the American Basketball League, which was the first professional basketball league that had truly attempted to go fully national after previous professional basketball leagues were mostly regional at the time. For the second straight season in a row, the American Basketball League would start out their season with nine teams competing in the split season formatting, with the two half seasons being utilized instead of one whole season being utilized throughout the entire season (which would be the case throughout the majority of the league's existence in the first place). However, unlike the previous season of play, not only would the original Brooklyn Arcadians team (sometimes referred to as the Brooklyn Rockets) end up being replaced by the Original Celtics under the temporary distinction of the Brooklyn Celtics for this season only, but the Detroit Pulaski Post Five / Lions would end up folding operations after six straight losses to their season (and by extension, get their record officially stricken from the record books entirely), with the Philadelphia Quakers / Phillies team also later being replaced by the Philadelphia Sphas under the Philadelphia Warriors name that would inspire the future Golden State Warriors NBA team by the time the second half of the season began. Despite the early uncertainties involved at the time, Rochester would unfortunately still end up being one of the weaker teams of the entire ABL this season despite their roster not being raided by the rivaling "original" National Basketball League (which was a failed attempt by the rivaling Metropolitan Basketball League to steal away clout from the ABL during this season, though it would ironically also feature the Original Celtics as a team there at the time) this season. During the first half of the season, the Centrals would end up having a below-average 8–13 record that ended up tying with the since-rebranded Fort Wayne Hoosiers for a fifth place finish that had them both be ahead of only the Chicago Bruins and the Baltimore Orioles in terms of teams that actually finished their seasons properly. As for the second half of the season, Rochester would perform even worse than they did in the first half of the season, with the Centrals ending this half of the season being tied with the Chicago Bruins this time around for a sixth place finish with an even worse 6–15 record, with both of them being only one game ahead of the Orioles basketball team from finishing in last place instead this time around. This underperformance from this season despite their roster not being raided by the rivaling "original" National Basketball League would lead to the Centrals failing to qualify for the ABL championship series for this season.

== Roster ==
Due to information on American Basketball League players being generally hard to find, there are bound to be more gaps and/or inaccuracies found in certain areas on the team's roster spots than usual.

Player	Position
Phil Barlow	C
Marty Barry	G/F
Lester Berlove	G
Jim Cullen	C
Swede Grimstead	C
Manny Hirsch	G/F
Trixie Messinger	G/F
Mike Mumby	G/F
John Murphy	G
Jimmy Nolan	G/F
Buck Pierson	G/F
Lou Rabin	G/F
Lefty Topel	G
Bill Uhlen	G/F
Joe Wallace	C

== American Basketball League Standings ==
First Half
Team	Wins	Losses	Winning %
Cleveland Rosenblums	17	4	.810
Washington Palace Five / Laundrymen	16	5	.762
Philadelphia Quakers / Phillies*	14	7	.667
Brooklyn Arcadians/Brooklyn Celtics**	13	8	.619
Rochester Centrals	8	13	.381
Fort Wayne Hoosiers	8	13	.381
Chicago Bruins	7	14	.333
Baltimore Orioles	1	20	.048
Detroit Pulaski Post Five / Lions†	0	6	.000

* – The Philadelphia Sphas would replace the Philadelphia Quakers during the second half of the season, albeit while playing under the original Philadelphia Warriors name instead of their typical Philadelphia SPHAs name.
** – After playing only in five total games this season (all of which ended in defeats), the Brooklyn Arcadians would have their franchise rights be both transferred and replaced by the Original Celtics franchise under the temporarily implemented name of the Brooklyn Celtics for the rest of this season in the ABL.
† – Withdrew from the ABL after playing only six total games during the first half of this season, with their games being stricken from the official league record books during this season.

Second Half
Team	Wins	Losses	Winning %
Brooklyn Celtics*	19	2	.905
Fort Wayne Hoosiers	15	6	.714
Washington Palace Five / Laundrymen	14	7	.667
Philadelphia Warriors**	10	11	.476
Cleveland Rosenblums	9	12	.429
Rochester Centrals	6	15	.286
Chicago Bruins	6	15	.286
Baltimore Orioles	5	16	.238

* – After playing only five total games this season (all of which ended in defeats), the Brooklyn Arcadians would have their franchise rights be both transferred and replaced by the Original Celtics franchise under the temporarily implemented name of the Brooklyn Celtics for the rest of this season in the ABL.
** – The Philadelphia Sphas would replace the Philadelphia Quakers during the second half of the season, albeit while playing under the original Philadelphia Warriors name instead of their typical Philadelphia SPHAs name.
