= 1928–29 New York Hakoahs season =

- League: American Basketball League (original)
- Head coach: Nat Holman
- General manager: Davey Banks & Nat Holman(?)
- Owner(s): Davey Banks & Nat Holman(?)
- Arena: Arcadia Hall

Results
- Record: 18–25 (.419)
- Place: Conference: 5th (both halves)
- Playoff finish: Did not qualify

The 1928–29 New York Hakoahs season was officially considered the first and only season of play held by the New York Hakoahs franchise. However, the Hakoahs (Hakoah being the Hebrew word for strength) would be named the replacement team for the Original Celtics after their team owner, Jim Furey, was sentenced to Sing Sing prison for a year for embezzlement (which would end up causing the Original Celtics franchise to break up their team roster in the process). As such, this season would also (potentially) be considered both the fifteenth season of independent play and the fifth professional season of play as well for the Original Celtics, albeit unofficially so due to the Celtics being suspended from the ABL this season following complaints involving them and team owner Jim Furey going to prison for embezzlement not long afterward. Due to the Original Celtics' roster being broken up and being spread out to other ABL teams this season (notably the Cleveland Rosenblums), the Hakoahs would end up only having a couple of the Original Celtics' players in Davey Banks and Nat Holman (the latter of whom being the team's player-coach this season) remaining on the team by the time they began play in the ABL as the replacements for the Original Celtics. Because of the team's roster being stripped bare and broken up following Jim Furey's time spent in prison (with the original plan for the team's players being that John "Pete" Barry and Dutch Dehnert would go to the Rochester Centrals, Joe Lapchick would head out to the Cleveland Rosenblums, John Beckman would be sent off to what was to be a planned expansion team within the city of Baltimore at the time (likely replacing the failed Baltimore Orioles ABL team), and Davey Banks and Nat Holman taking part in the new team representing New York), the New York Hakoahs would end up having the majority of their players be predominantly Jewish (similar to what the Philadelphia Sphas were doing in the city of Philadelphia back when they previously were in the ABL in the prior two seasons of play as the Philadelphia Warriors), with Nat Holman being named the (new) head coach of the team while playing for the Hakoahs as well.

In an attempt to have the Hakoahs become as successful as the Original Celtics franchise was for Banks and Holman at the time, the duo decided to add in Herman "Chickie" Passon from the Philadelphia Warriors turned (briefly) independently ran Philadelphia Sphas franchise (though he wouldn't be a part of the team's final roster by the time they began playing), Willie McDonald (apparently was listed with the last name of Marron somehow?) from the Brooklyn Visitations, and three league rookies in Reds Sherr from the University of Pennsylvania, Sam Schein from the City College of New York, and Red Wolfe from New York University, with later additions in former CCNY college teammates of Holman's in Irv Goldberg, Doc Edelstein, and Teddy Meisel all joining the team to reunite under Holman's vision as well. Unfortunately for this New York squad, the new players that the Hakoahs would get to enter the ABL with would not be as high quality as the players that were on the Original Celtics during the previous two seasons, as the Hakoahs would surprisingly struggle under Holman's coaching prowess during this season of play. Not only that, while the Original Celtics and teams from the ABL's first few seasons had good quality contracts that made paying their players feel affordable in written bonds at the time, the New York Hakoahs would end up having players like Jammy Moskowitz hold only a $300 per month contract through verbal agreements instead, which would hurt the Hakoahs' form of play that season as well. While the overall record the Hakoahs got this season would be 18–25 for a fifth place finish, the split season formatting that returned to action for this season would actually see the Hakoahs get a combined 5th place placement throughout both halves of the season with their first half of the season resulting in a below-average 13–16 record and the second half of the season leading to a worse-looking 5–9 record to lead to that overall fifth place finish. The placement of the New York team during this season would easily result in the Hakoahs failing to live up to the reputation that the Original Celtics squad had throughout their history up until this point in time. By the time the following season was about to commence, Original Celtics team owner Jim Furey would be released from prison due to the time he had originally spent from embezzlement earlier on, which led to the Original Celtics returning to action once more and taking over the spot that was held by the Hakoahs in the ABL for the 1929–30 season, albeit with an entirely new, broken up roster to work with by comparison to what he had on his team beforehand. By that point, however, the Original Celtics wouldn't be the same franchise that they once were beforehand, and after ten games there, that Celtics franchise would end up folding operations in 1930 after leaving the ABL (which itself would be struggling due to the long-term effects of the Great Depression) on December 19, 1929.

== Roster ==
Due to information on American Basketball League players being generally hard to find, there are bound to be more gaps and/or inaccuracies found in certain areas on the team's roster spots than usual.

Player	Position
Davey Banks	G/F
Gaza Chizmadia	F/C
Doc Edelstein	G/F
Sonny Gluck	G
Irv Goldberg	G/F
Bob Griebe	F/C
Nat Holman	G/F
Hank Knudsen	C
Willie McDonald	F
Stretch Meehan	C
Teddy Meisel	G/F
Jammy Moskowitz	G/F
Sam Schein	G
Reds Sherr	F/C
Red Skurnick	G/F
Lefty Topel	G
Red Wolfe	G

== American Basketball League Standings ==
First Half
Team	Wins	Losses	Winning %
Cleveland Rosenblums	19	9	.679
Fort Wayne Hoosiers	18	10	.643
Brooklyn Visitations	15	12	.556
Chicago Bruins	15	12	.556
New York Hakoahs	13	16	.448
Trenton (Royal) Bengals	12	16	.429
Rochester Centrals	11	15	.423
Paterson Whirlwinds	6	19	.240

Second Half
Team	Wins	Losses	Winning %
Fort Wayne Hoosiers	11	3	.786
Cleveland Rosenblums	10	4	.714
Brooklyn Visitations	10	4	.714
Rochester Centrals	7	7	.500
New York Hakoahs	5	9	.357
Trenton (Royal) Bengals	4	8	.333
Chicago Bruins	4	10	.286
Paterson Whirlwinds	3	9	.250
