= 1929–30 Chicago Bruins season =

- League: American Basketball League (original)
- Head coach: Honey Russell
- General manager: George Halas
- Owner(s): George Halas & Charles Bidwill
- Arena: Chicago Coliseum

Results
- Record: 29–25 (.537)
- Place: Conference: T–4th (1st half); 3rd (2nd half)
- Playoff finish: Did not qualify

The 1929–30 Chicago Bruins season was both the Bruins' fifth season of existence as a professional franchise (after previously playing at least one season independently as a team) and the fifth season of existence for the American Basketball League, which was the first professional basketball league that had truly attempted to go fully national after previous professional basketball leagues were mostly regional at the time. For the fourth time in five seasons, the American Basketball League would utilize the split season formatting, though similar to the previous ABL season, the American Basketball League would have eight teams competing within the two half seasons that were being utilized here instead of the one whole season that was being was the season before that one. However, unlike that previous season, this season would see not just one, but two different teams drop out of the ABL entirely, with the New York (Original) Celtics basically being a shell of their former selves by this point in time and later having their average 5–5 record be stricken from the record books by the end of the season after dropping out of the league by December 19, 1929, while the Syracuse All-Americans fared even worse than them by comparison, to the point where they ended up forfeiting their final four games scheduled in the first half of the season after officially dropping out of the season themselves on January 6, 1930. Despite previously letting go of Honey Russell during the second half of the previous regular season, Russell would return to being a full-time player-coach for the Bruins once again this season. This return would help lead to the Bruins out in getting their best overall record in a season ever with a 29–25 record, though it would be through an average 12–12 first half of the season combined with a much better, above-average 17–13 second half of the season. Unfortunately for Chicago, the average 12–12 record would be tied with the Fort Wayne Hoosiers for a fourth place finish in terms of teams that finished their seasons properly, while the Bruins' 17–13 record in the second half was still behind the two championship contending teams of the season in the defending champion Cleveland Rosenblums and the Rochester Centrals to end that half with a third place finish in the process. Because of that fact, the Bruins would easily fail to qualify for the ABL's playoff/championship series once again for the fifth straight season (which would just be a championship series held by the two best teams in each half-season from this specific ABL season played once again this time around).

== Roster ==
Due to information on American Basketball League players being generally hard to find, there are bound to be more gaps and/or inaccuracies found in certain areas on the team's roster spots than usual.

Player	Position
Art Bramhall	G-F
Gil Ely	G-F
Nat Hickey	G-F
Nat Holman	G-F
Al Kellett	C
Ray Kennedy	G
Willie McDonald	F
Stretch Murphy	C
Honey Russell	G-F
Tillie Voss	F-C
Whitey Wickhorst	G-F

While Willie McDonald is listed to be part of the team's roster for this season, it's not known if he officially played for the team during this season properly.

== American Basketball League Standings ==
First Half
Team	Wins	Losses	Winning %
Cleveland Rosenblums	17	7	.738
Brooklyn Visitations	15	9	.625
Rochester Centrals	14	10	.583
Chicago Bruins	12	12	.500
Fort Wayne Hoosiers	12	12	.500
Paterson Crescents	10	14	.417
New York (Original) Celtics†*	5	5	.500
Syracuse All-Americans†	4	20	.167

† – Withdrew from the ABL before the first half of the season officially ended, with the New York (Original) Celtics dropping out of the league on December 19, 1929 and the Syracuse All-Americans dropping out of the ABL (and forfeiting their final four games of the first half of the season by default) on January 6, 1930 near the end of the first half of the season.
* – Withdrew from the ABL after playing only ten total games during the first half of this season, with their games being stricken from the official league record books during this season despite having an average record this season.

Second Half
Team	Wins	Losses	Winning %
Rochester Centrals	19	11	.633
Cleveland Rosenblums	18	12	.600
Chicago Bruins	17	13	.567
Brooklyn Visitations	15	15	.500
Fort Wayne Hoosiers	13	17	.433
Paterson Crescents	8	22	.267
