= 1928–29 Chicago Bruins season =

- League: American Basketball League (original)
- Head coach: Honey Russell (18–18); Ray Kennedy (1–4)
- General manager: George Halas
- Owner(s): George Halas & Charles Bidwill
- Arena: Chicago Coliseum

Results
- Record: 19–22 (.463)
- Place: Conference: T–3rd (1st half); 7th (2nd half)
- Playoff finish: Did not qualify

The 1928–29 Chicago Bruins season was both the Bruins' fourth season of existence as a professional franchise (after previously playing at least one season independently as a team) and the fourth season of existence for the American Basketball League, which was the first professional basketball league that had truly attempted to go fully national after previous professional basketball leagues were mostly regional at the time. For the third time in four seasons, the American Basketball League would utilize the split season formatting, though similar to the previous season, the ABL would have eight teams competing within the two half seasons that were being utilized here instead of the one whole season being was utilized during the previous ABL season. This season would see its most stable period of time ever during the original ABL's existence since none of the eight teams that competed during this season (the New York (Original) Celtics did not compete in the ABL this season due to team owner James Furey serving time in prison for embezzlement) would wind up either leaving the league during the season or end up moving operations for some odd reason during the season for whatever odd reason would be in mind, which would complicate things on the league's own ends. Unfortunately for the Bruins, they would still see genuine issues during the season, as while they would end up getting a tied third place record with the Brooklyn Visitations through a 15–12 record (being behind both the Fort Wayne Hoosiers and Cleveland Rosenblums for a first place finish in that half of the season), the Bruins would be without player-coach Honey Russell for the rest of the second half of the season after they had a more disappointing 3–6 start for the latter half of the season, leading to former high-scoring guard Ray Kennedy being the player-coach of the team for the rest of that half of the season, ending the season with a 1–4 record for an overall 4–10 finish for a seventh place finish where they were ahead of only the Paterson Whirlwinds this time around for a more disappointing overall total season record of 19–22 when combining both halves together. Because of that fact, the Bruins would easily fail to qualify for the ABL's playoff/championship series once again for the fourth straight season (which would just be a championship series held by the two best teams in each half-season from this specific ABL season played once again this time around).

== Roster ==
Due to information on American Basketball League players being generally hard to find, there are bound to be more gaps and/or inaccuracies found in certain areas on the team's roster spots than usual.

Player	Position
Bill Brown	G
Gil Ely	G-F
Mark Harper	C
Nat Hickey	G-F
Al Kellett	C
Ray Kennedy	G
Stretch Meehan	C
Honey Russell	G-F
Red Skurnick	G
Dick Sturtridge	F
Lefty Topei	G
Tillie Voss	F-C
Whitey Wickhorst	G-F

There would also be a player with the last name of Nash that was also on the team for two different games played on December 5 and 12, 1928.

== American Basketball League Standings ==
First Half
Team	Wins	Losses	Winning %
Cleveland Rosenblums	19	9	.679
Fort Wayne Hoosiers	18	10	.643
Brooklyn Visitations	15	12	.556
Chicago Bruins	15	12	.556
New York Hakoahs	13	16	.448
Trenton (Royal) Bengals	12	16	.429
Rochester Centrals	11	15	.423
Paterson Whirlwinds	6	19	.240

Second Half
Team	Wins	Losses	Winning %
Fort Wayne Hoosiers	11	3	.786
Cleveland Rosenblums	10	4	.714
Brooklyn Visitations	10	4	.714
Rochester Centrals	7	7	.500
New York Hakoahs	5	9	.357
Trenton (Royal) Bengals	4	8	.333
Chicago Bruins	4	10	.286
Paterson Whirlwinds	3	9	.250
