= 1932–33 National Professional Basketball League season =

1932–33 NPBL season
- League: National Professional Basketball League
- Sport: Basketball
- Duration: December(?) 1932 – 1933
- Games: Various
- Teams: 9 (later dwindled down to 5)

Regular season
- Season champions: Akron Firestone Non-Skids
- Top scorer: John Wooden (Indianapolis Kautskys)

NPBL Championship Series
- Regular season champions champions: Akron Firestone Non-Skids
- Regular season champions runners-up: Toledo Crimson Coaches Tobaccos

NPBL Championship Series
- Venue: Firestone Clubhouse, Akron, Ohio; The Field House (University of Toledo), Toledo, Ohio
- Champions: Akron Firestone Non-Skids
- Runners-up: Toledo Crimson Coaches Tobaccos

NPBL/MBC seasons
- 1935–36 (MBC) →

The 1932–33 NPBL season was the only season of play for what could be considered as the "original" National Professional Basketball League (a league that has been considered by sports historians to either be an amateur basketball league or a semipro basketball league which would not be connected to the actual original National Professional Basketball League from the 1929–30 season) that had a connection to the Midwest Basketball Conference that later became the National Basketball League which would become a part of the present-day National Basketball Association. While the NPBL would have much less ties to the NBA than it would to the MBC/NBL (with it technically only having ties due to the Indianapolis Kautskys briefly operating in the league while it was in the precursor that was known as the Basketball Association of America as the Indianapolis Jets in their only season in that league), it would still technically have more of a connection to the NBA in that regard than this version of the NPBL had with the actual, original version of the NPBL that would not officially connect the two versions of the NPBL together (with the only ties in mind being the Toledo Red Man Tobaccos team from the original NPBL (and later, the ABL under its original existence) that became the Toledo Crimson Coaches Tobaccos for this season alongside both versions of the NPBL having teams being primarily focused in the state of Ohio). While the NPBL was ambitious for its time with its goals with having nine teams competing in its league at the start of the season in the time where the Great Depression would be at arguably its highest point of wealth inequality, the NPBL would default to as low as five competitive teams by the end of the season, with one of its teams in the Akron Goodyear Wingfoots works team only competing in six official games for this season. This would lead to the NPBL having a championship series where the two best teams would compete in a best-of-five championship series following the conclusion of its inconsistent regular season period, which would include the nearly undefeated Akron Firestone Non-Skids works team and the Toledo Crimson Coaches Tobaccos (with the latter team being one game ahead of the Indianapolis Kautskys for second place in the league), with the Firestone squad sweeping Toledo not long afterward. Following the conclusion of this season, the NPBL would shut down operations, with the owners of the Akron Firestone Non-Skids and the Indianapolis Kautskys later looking to revamp the league a couple of years later into something new for themselves to compete in with the Midwest Basketball Conference.

== Creation of the League ==
Originally, the National Professional Basketball League would first exist in the 1929–30 season where that iteration of the league would have teams competing in the states of Ohio and Michigan, with the Toledo Red Man Tobaccos being the champions of the league over the Dayton Kellys to conclude that season before they moved on from the NPBL to the much larger American Basketball League. However, due to the Great Depression, the ABL would suspend operations by 1931, meaning that any professional basketball leagues operating at the time would be more regional like the brief revivals of the Eastern Basketball League and the Metropolitan Basketball League. As such, when the National Professional Basketball League was looking to revive itself (at least in name only) when entering the 1932–33 season, the new NPBL would look to have teams active in the states of Ohio and Indiana alongside the city of Chicago, Illinois instead of just the state of Ohio and Michigan. Originally, the NPBL planned on having eight teams from these specific locations taking part in the new iteration of that league for this season of play. However, when the NPBL was officially created throughout the season, there would be nine teams created at the start of the season before it devolved downward to only five teams by the end of its only season of play.

== Teams ==
Before beginning their season properly, the NPBL would initially look at having eight teams operating in the NPBL, with those teams meeting up in Fort Wayne, Indiana and there being representatives from Fort Wayne, Indiana; Chicago, Illinois, and multiple Ohio-based represented in the cities of Akron (with Akron likely having two teams in mind for their city), Camden, Cleveland, Dayton, and Toledo to create the technically revived NPBL. However, some time between when the planned meeting in Fort Wayne occurred and when the NPBL ultimately began its season, the NPBL would lose a planned location out in Chicago, but gain an extra team to have nine teams in their league throughout the states of Ohio and Indiana, with Ohio having two works teams added from Akron in the Akron Firestone Non-Skids and the Akron Goodyear Wingfoots (thus making it one of the first professional basketball leagues to have works teams added onto a professional basketball league), the Lorain Fisher Foods from Lorain, and the recently rebranded former "original" NPBL turned ABL team in the Toledo Crimson Coaches Tobaccos (being rebranded from their original Toledo Red Man Tobaccos name due to their original team owners being Pinkerton Tobacco, who would own what was originally named Red Man Tobacco at the time) from Toledo, while Indiana would have teams from Fort Wayne in the Fort Wayne Chiefs (who are suggested to be a rebranded version of the original ABL team known as the Fort Wayne Hoosiers), the capital city of Indianapolis in the Indianapolis Kautskys (who would recently rebrand themselves to that name after previously being known as the Indianapolis Kautsky A.C.'s on an independent basis), the Kokomo Kelts from Kokomo, the Muncie Whys from Muncie, and the South Bend Guardsmen from South Bend. Unfortunately for the NPBL, their teams would see the league struggle as early as the first game of the season with the Lorain Fisher Foods folding operations following their only game that ended in defeat for them, with more teams dropping out of the league throughout the season before it eventually concluded with only five teams remaining in the league by the end of the season. Interestingly, three of the five surviving teams from this season would end up returning to compete in what would become the Midwest Basketball Conference (later known as the National Basketball League), with the Indianapolis Kautskys later competing in the Basketball Association of America (now known as the National Basketball Association) to give this iteration of the National Professional Basketball League a bit of a connection to the NBA as well.

National Professional Basketball League
Akron Firestone Non-Skids

Akron, Ohio

Akron Goodyear Wingfoots

Akron, Ohio

Fort Wayne Chiefs

Fort Wayne, Indiana

Indianapolis Kautskys

Indianapolis, Indiana

Kokomo Kelts

Kokomo, Indiana

Lorain Fisher Foods

Lorain, Ohio

Muncie Whys

Muncie, Indiana

South Bend Guardsmen

South Bend, Indiana

Toledo Crimson Coaches Tobaccos

Toledo, Ohio

== Assessment ==
While the NPBL was created in an attempt to bring the professional game of basketball to the Midwestern region of the United States of America, almost immediately after playing their first games of the season would the NPBL end up seeing trouble. Following the first game of the season, where the Lorain Fisher Foods would lose what became their only game played that season, Lorain would drop out of the league on December 15, 1932, due to serious financial issues on their end. Not long after that, the Kokomo Kelts would officially drop out of the league over a month later on January 16, 1933, with the NPBL eventually seeing only five teams remain in their league by the conclusion of the season. As a result of this, the number of games played throughout the season by the remaining number of surviving teams would vary from only six total games by the Akron Goodyear Wingfoots works team to around 13 games played by the Fort Wayne Chiefs to conclude the season, which controversially would decide who would become the second and final team competing in the championship series for this season. Despite this season ending in failure due to the Great Depression, it would end up laying the foundation of what would eventually become the building blocks for the present-day National Basketball Association to exist due to the owners of the Akron Firestone Non-Skids and Indianapolis Kautskys wanting to revamp the NPBL under a different moniker with a more serious rule basis that also supported the players that were working in other jobs at the time alongside their professional play at hand with basketball.

== Final standings ==
Pos.	Team	Wins	Losses	Win %
1	Akron Firestone Non-Skids	10	1	.909
2	Toledo Crimson Coaches Tobaccos	8	4	.667
3	Indianapolis Kautskys	7	4	.636
4	Akron Goodyear Wingfoots	2	4	.333
5	Fort Wayne Chiefs	4	9	.308
6	Kokomo Kelts†	2	3	.400
7	Muncie Whys†	1	4	.200
8	South Bend Guardsmen†	1	5	.167
9	Lorain Fisher Foods†	0	1	.000

† – Dropped out of the NPBL at various points in the season.

Earlier resources that would try and record the final results for this iteration of the National Professional Basketball League (which would sometimes misname it as the National Basketball League for some odd reason) would not include the proper, final results for the Toledo Crimson Coaches Tobaccos, Indianapolis Kautskys, Akron Goodyear Wingfoots, Fort Wayne Chiefs, or even the South Bend Guardsmen (despite that team dropping out of the league themselves), with the final championship series results not being included as well.

== Championship Series ==
Due to the NPBL not only finishing the season with only five competitive teams to end their season, but also utilizing a proper regular season format instead of a split season format to determine their champions, this version of the NPBL decided to implement a best-of-five championship series between the two best teams of the league for this season, which would turn out to be the nearly-undefeated Akron Firestone Non-Skids works team and the Toledo Crimson Coaches Tobaccos, who would gain their second place spot over the Indianapolis Kautskys due to Toledo winning one extra game over Indianapolis this season. This season would conclude with the Firestone Non-Skids works team sweeping the Crimson Coaches Tobaccos 3–0 to become the only champions of the league that season.

NPBL Championship
1	Akron Firestone Non-Skids	18	31	27
2	Toledo Crimson Coaches Tobaccos	13	24	24

- Bold Series winner

== Leading scorer ==
Prior to the 1969–70 NBA season, league leaders in points were determined by totals rather than averages. Also, rebounding and assist numbers were not recorded properly in the NPBL like they would be in the BAA/NBA, as would field goal and free-throw shooting percentages. With that said, John Wooden of the Indianapolis Kautskys would be the leading scorer of the entire league this season due to him scoring 126 points in 11 games played for an average of 11.5 points per game.

== See also ==
- National Basketball League (United States)
