= 1927–28 Rochester Centrals season =

- League: American Basketball League (original)
- Head coach: Nick Harvey (17–13); John Murphy (7–5)
- General manager: Jack Neiman(?)
- Owner(s): Eddie Schlegal; Edward Miller; Johnny Murphy
- Arena: Naval Militia Armory

Results
- Record: 24–28 (.462)
- Place: Division: 4th (Eastern)
- Playoff finish: Did not qualify

The 1927–28 Rochester Centrals season was both the Centrals' third season of existence as a professional franchise in the city of Rochester, New York and the third season of existence for the American Basketball League, which was the first professional basketball league that had truly attempted to go fully national after previous professional basketball leagues were mostly regional at the time. For the first season ever in the league's history (and the only time in its inaugural period of existence), the ABL would abandon its split season formatting to have one whole regular season of play, with the eight teams there competing in two divisions of four teams each (with Washington competing in the Eastern Division alongside teams like the Original Celtics (labeled as the New York (Original) Celtics during this season), the Philadelphia Warriors, and the Rochester Centrals). However, even this season would see some issues going on within the league, as not only would the Detroit Cardinals / Olympians expansion team end up folding operations on January 3, 1928 following poor attendance issues, but the Washington Palace Five / Laundrymen team would end up being replaced by the Metropolitan Basketball League's Brooklyn Visitations at the exact same time in the process. Despite these issues going on within the ABL, Rochester had entered that period of time being the second-best team within the Eastern Division at the time behind the Original Celtics franchise, with the Centrals having an 11–5 record by New Year's Eve. However, once the changes within the ABL occurred, the Centrals would experience a seriously awful reversal of fortunes upon the rest of their season going forward, as they would end up having a 15–22 record to tie their placement with the Philadelphia Warriors at one point to hold second place in the Eastern Division. Unlike the Philadelphia Warriors, who would end up turning things around long enough to finish the season with a 30–21 record, the Rochester Centrals would end up continuing their losing woes for the rest of the 1928 year for this season, as they would not only finish the season with a 24–28 record, but also finish the season with a last place finish in the Eastern Division behind the combined placement of the Washington Palace Five and the Brooklyn Visitations working together for this season. As such, the Centrals would fail to qualify for the newly-created ABL playoffs that were made for this season.

== Roster ==
Due to information on American Basketball League players being generally hard to find, there are bound to be more gaps and/or inaccuracies found in certain areas on the team's roster spots than usual.

| Player | Position |
|---|---|
| Phil Barlow | C |
| Marty Barry | G/F |
| Bob Grody | G/F |
| Nick Harvey | G |
| Fritz Knothe | G/F |
| Hash McNell | G |
| Jimmy Nolan | G/F |
| Lou Rabin | G/F |
| Frank Roxbury | G/F |
| Sam Siegel | G/F |
| Lefty Topel | G |
| Joe Wallace | C |

Note: In addition to all of these players, there was also an unknown forward with the last name of Connelly that briefly was on the team as well.

== American Basketball League Standings ==
=== Eastern Division ===
Eastern Division
| Team | Wins | Losses | Winning % |
|---|---|---|---|
| New York (Original) Celtics | 40 | 9 | .816 |
| Philadelphia Warriors | 30 | 21 | .588 |
| Washington Palace Five (/ Laundrymen) / Brooklyn Visitations* | 25 | 26 | .490 |
| Rochester Centrals | 24 | 28 | .462 |

* – The Washington Palace Five / Laundrymen franchise would have their franchise rights and record be transferred out to the Brooklyn Visitations by January 3, 1928 for the unofficial second half of the season.

=== Western Division ===
Western Division
| Team | Wins | Losses | Winning % |
|---|---|---|---|
| Fort Wayne Hoosiers | 27 | 24 | .529 |
| Cleveland Rosenblums | 22 | 29 | .431 |
| Chicago Bruins | 13 | 36 | .265 |
| Detroit Cardinals / Olympians† | 5 | 13 | .278 |

† – Withdrew from the ABL on January 3, 1928 by the start of the unofficial second half of the season.

== Awards and honors ==
By the end of the season, Harry Topel would end up being the leading scorer of the entire league in its third season of existence (and the first time someone outside of Rusty Saunders would earn that honor) with 438 points scored for an average of 8.4 points per game.
