= Lee Sankowich =

American theatre director

Lee David Sankowich is an American theatre director, producer, and educator. He is best known for his productions of One Flew Over the Cuckoo's Nest and for his leadership roles at Marin Theatre Company and the Zephyr Theatre in Los Angeles.

== Early life and education ==
Sankowich was born in San Francisco in 1942, the son of Samuel S. Sankowich and Sarah B. Sankowich (née Blumenfeld). He is an alumnus of Lowell High School in San Francisco (1959), attended University of Southern California, and then graduated from San Francisco State. Sankowich's family took in one of the children from Kindertransport, from the short-lived early period in Nazi Germany when Jewish parents could send their children out of country. He grew up with that child. He has two daughters, Sarah Sankowich and the late Marti Sankowich.

== Career ==
=== One Flew Over the Cuckoo's Nest ===
Sankowich's career gained significant momentum with his direction of Dale Wasserman's adaptation of One Flew Over the Cuckoo's Nest, based on Ken Kesey's novel. Sankowich's production included Danny DeVito as Martini and William Devane as McMurphy. The Film version of One Flew Over the Cuckoo's Nest was released in 1975 with DeVito reprising his stage role.

- San Francisco (1970–1975): The production opened at the Little Fox Theatre, enjoying a five-year run.
- Off-Broadway (1971–1973): Following its success in San Francisco, the play was staged Off-Broadway at the Mercer-Hansberry Theatre, running for two and a half years.
- Boston (1972–1973): played for a year and a half at the Charles Playhouse.
- Israel Touring Company (1972): including Jerusalem, Haifa, Tel Aviv
- Marin Theatre Company (1995): As Artistic Director, Sankowich revisited the play, directing a production that opened on September 27, 1995.

Marin Theatre Company (1990–2006)

Sankowich served as Artistic Director of Marin Theatre Company, in Mill Valley, California, for 16 years. During his tenure, he directed 45 plays, including two estate-sanctioned world premieres of previously unproduced Tennessee Williams works: Spring Storm and Fugitive Kind.

=== Zephyr Theatre (1978–Present) ===
In 1978, Sankowich purchased the Zephyr Theatre in Los Angeles. After leaving Marin Theatre Company in 2006, he returned to the Zephyr as Producing Artistic Director.

== Academic career ==
From 1986 to 1990, Sankowich was an Associate Professor of Drama at Carnegie Mellon University.

== Regional theatre work ==
Sankowich has directed productions at various regional theatres across the United States, including:

- Baltimore Center Stage
- The Mark Taper Forum
- South Coast Repertory
- Florida Stage
- GEVA Theatre Center
- Jewish Repertory Theatre
- City Theatre (Pittsburgh)
- Center Repertory Company, where he served as Artistic Director for over a year
- San Jose Stage Company
- TheatreWorks
- Pittsburgh Public Theater, where he served as Resident Director (Edith Stein, The Normal Heart, Hedda Gabler, Vikings, The Real Thing, Becoming Memories)

=== Collaborations with Arthur Giron ===
Sankowich collaborated with playwright Arthur Giron on several projects:

- Dirty Jokes (1979): Directed the world premiere with Michael Moriarty at the Drake Theatre at Barat College Summer with the Stars
- Edith Stein (1988): Directed the world premiere at Pittsburgh Public Theater, exploring the life of the Jewish intellectual-turned-Catholic nun who perished in Auschwitz. (Lee also did four other productions of Edith Stein, including Off-Broadway at Playhouse 91.
- Becoming Memories (1990): Directed this play at Pittsburgh Public Theater, further solidifying their collaborative relationship. (and two other productions.)

=== As playwright ===
Sankowich wrote his first play, For Honor, about the Warsaw Ghetto uprising, which will have staged readings in early summer 2025.

== Notable productions ==
In addition to One Flew Over the Cuckoo's Nest and Edith Stein, Sankowich's notable directorial works include:

- Death of a Salesman (1972): Directed the first professional all-black production, working with Arthur Miller on the production, at the Baltimore Center Stage
- Dylan (1973): Mercer Arts Center with Karen Gourney and Rue McClanahan
- Serenading Louie (1986): Pittsburgh Public Theater
- Sunday in the Park with George (1987): Pittsburgh Public Theatre with Marcus Lovett and daughter, Sarah Sankowich
- 23 Years Later (1992): Mark Taper Forum
- The Last Schwartz (2006): Marin Theatre with Michael Tucker and Jill Eikenberry, and a seven-month run at the Zephyr (2006–2007)
- Killer Joe (2006): Marin Theatre Company, starring Stacy Ross and Cully Fredicksen, after a sold-out run, it moved to the Magic Theatre
- Low Hanging Fruit (2014): Directed the world premiere at the Zephyr Theatre

== Awards and recognition ==
Sankowich has received multiple accolades for his contributions to theatre, including four San Francisco Bay Area Drama Critics Circle Awards for Direction, and several Best Production of the Year honors.
