= Roddy Lamb =

American football player (1899–1995)

No. 1, 6
- Position: Quarterback

Personal information
- Born: August 20, 1899; Garrison, Nebraska, U.S.
- Died: December 21, 1995 (aged 96)

Career information
- College: Lombard

Career history
- Rock Island Independents (1925); Chicago Cardinals (1926–1927, 1933)

Career statistics
- TD–INT: 0-1
- Yards: 8

Roy Elmer Lamb (August 20, 1899 – December 21, 1995) was an American football player for the Rock Island Independents and Chicago Cardinals. He played college football for Lombard College. He also played professional basketball for the Chicago Bruins during their time in the original American Basketball League as well.
