= Rollie Boldt =

American basketball player and coach (1904–1972)

Biographical details
- Born: April 4, 1904
- Died: March 13, 1972 (aged 67); Maumee, Ohio, U.S.

Playing career

Men's basketball
- 1923–1924: National Supply
- 1924–1927: Oak Harbor American Legion
- 1927: Scott Shops
- 1927–1930: Toledo Red Man Tobaccos
- Position: Guard

Coaching career (HC unless noted)

Men's basketball
- 1923–1930: Woodward Technical HS (OH) (Asst.)
- 1930–1937: Point Place HS (OH)
- 1944–1946: Toledo
- 1947–1954: Toledo (Asst.)

Head coaching record
- Overall: 29–11 (NCAA)

Rolland Edward Boldt (April 4, 1904 – March 13, 1972) was an American basketball player and coach who was the head coach of the Toledo Rockets men's basketball team from 1944 to 1946.

== Playing career ==
Boldt played basketball at Woodward Technical High School and was captain of the 1922–23 team. After graduating, he played professionally and semiprofessionally for the National Supply, Oak Harbor American Legion, Scott Shops, and Toledo Red Man Tobaccos teams.

== Coaching ==
Boldt served as an assistant at Woodward Tech while attending the University of Toledo. After graduating, he was the head basketball and baseball coach at Point Place High School. In 1932, the Point Place baseball team won the Class B District championship. The high school closed in 1937 after Point Place was annexed into the city of Toledo and Boldt became a teacher at the Point Place Junior High School.

Boldt returned to coaching in 1944, when he was named head basketball coach at the University of Toledo. Toledo played a limited schedule that season due to World War II and finished the year with a 9–4 record. The war ended in time for the school to arrange a stronger schedule for the 1945–46 season and the Rockets went 20–7. Boldt resigned after the season allow a full-time coach to be hired, but returned in 1947 as an assistant to Jerry Bush. Boldt coached the team for the first two games of the 1952–53 season while Bush was away on a scouting trip. He resigned in 1954, as the university wanted an assistant basketball coach who was a full-time staff member while Boldt did not want to lose his tenure in the Toledo City School District.

== Later life ==
From 1949 until his retirement in 1966, Boldt was a social studies and orientation teacher at Macomber High School. In 1953, he coached the Macomber tennis team to the city championship. He also served as manager of the Jermain Park tennis courts from 1947 to 1965. He died on March 13, 1972, at St. Luke's Hospital.
