= Toledo Red Man Tobaccos =

American basketball team

Toledo Red Man Tobaccos Toledo Crimson Coach Tobaccos
- Leagues: National Professional Basketball League (1929–1930); American Basketball League (1930–1931); National Professional Basketball League (1932–1933)
- Founded: 1926
- Folded: 1935
- Arena: Westminster Gym (1926–1928); Toledo YMCA gym (1928–1929); Toledo Civic Auditorium (1929–1932); Toledo Coliseum (1932–1933); Knights of Columbus gym (1933–1934); Toledo Coliseum (1935)
- General manager: Ed Cannon
- Head coach: Pete Doelling (1927–1928); Pip Koehler (1928–1930); Dutch Dehnert (1930–1931)

The Toledo Red Man Tobaccos are a defunct American basketball team based in Toledo, Ohio that were champions of the National Professional Basketball League during the 1929–30 season. For the 1930–31 season, the team played in the American Basketball League, with 12 wins and 24 losses in that season. In 1932, the team returned to the NPBL as the Toledo Crimson Coach Tobaccos.

== History ==
=== Early years ===
The Red Man Tobaccos were sponsored by the Toledo-based Pinkerton Tobacco Company, which produced Red Man Tobacco, and requested to be billed as the Red Man instead of the Red Men to avoid confusion with the Improved Order of Red Men. The team began in 1926 as an industrial team and became a semipro team the following season. The Red Man Tobacco team originally played in the Westminster Gym and featured a number of Toledo's former high school and college stars, such as Rollie Boldt, as well as professional players like Chase Clements. It was managed by Ed Cannon and coached by A. W. "Pete" Doelling. In 1928, the Red Man moved to the Toledo YMCA gym. Cannon had 200 bleacher seats installed, which brought capacity up to 1,100. An electric timing and scoring device was also installed. That same year, the team added former Ohio State center Cookie Cunningham and player-coach Pip Koehler.

During its semipro years, the Toledo Red Man Tobaccos opponents included teams from the American Basketball League (the Chicago Bruins, Cleveland Rosenblums, New York Celtics, Rochester Centrals, and Fort Wayne Hoosiers), barnstorming clubs (Jim Thorpe's World Famous Indians and Olson's Terrible Swedes), independent outfits (Flint Buick Flyers, Rochester Olds Motors, and Canton Orphans), and industrial teams (Akron Goodyear Wingfoots, Fort Wayne General Electrics, Auburn Automobile, Michigan Central Railroad, Robert Lee Shops, and Detroit Tool Shop).

=== National Professional Basketball League ===
In 1929, the Red Man Tobaccos were a founding member of the National Professional Basketball League. The NPBL, which also included teams from Detroit, Pontiac, Flint, Dayton, Columbus, Canton, and Cincinnati, was headed by Red Man manager Ed Cannon. The team moved to the new Toledo Civic Auditorium, which could seat over 4,200 spectators for basketball games. Cannon signed former Cleveland Rosenblums and Fort Wayne Hoosiers forward Len Sheppard to one of the largest contracts in professional basketball. Toledo finished the season with a 17–3 record and defeated the Dayton Kellys 4 games to 2 to win the NBPL championship.

=== American Basketball League ===
In 1930, Cannon was offered a franchise in the American Basketball League. He requested three players as a condition of joining the league and only joined after this demand was met, which caused hard feelings from the ABL's other owners, who felt that his intransigence had delayed the league. That December, Cannon, unhappy with the team's play, released all of the Red Man players except for Davey Banks and signed five members of the recently folded Cleveland Rosenblums (Dutch Dehnert, Joe Lapchick, Pete Barry, Lou Spindell, and Charley Shudtz). The Red Man finished the year with a 12–24 record and were well off the pace for the first and second half championships.

=== Return to independence ===
The ABL elected not to play a 1931–32 season due to financial difficulties caused by the Great Depression, but the Red Man continued as an independent team. Denhert, Lapchick, Banks, and Barry left the team to form the Rosenblum-Celtics with Nat Hickey. Cannon replaced them with Frank Shimek, Rusty Saunders, Carl Husta, and Shang Chadwick – the latter three coming from the reigning ABL champion Fort Wayne Hoosiers. The Red Man Tobaccos opponents included the Brooklyn Visitations, New York Renaissance, and Chicago Bruins.

=== Return to the NPBL ===
In 1932, Toledo returned to National Professional Basketball League, this time sponsored by another Toledo tobacco company – Crimson Coach, and playing at the Toledo Coliseum. The Crimson Coach Tobaccos consisted of Fred Jacobs, Abe Yourist, Arnie Straka, Ollie Wiza, Hank Hubbard, Jim Barnham, and captain Pip Koehler and finished the year with an 8–4 record. The team made the NPBL finals, but were swept in three games by the Akron Firestone Non-Skids. Unlike the previous National Professional Basketball League that the Toledo franchise had played in (and won a championship in), this version of the NPBL would technically end up being a precursor to the National Basketball League, which would eventually end up merging operations with the Basketball Association of America to become the present-day National Basketball Association.

=== Later years ===
The NPBL folded after the 1932–33 season and the Crimson Coaches became an independent team once again. Cannon was able to retain a number of players (including Koehler, Jacons, Straka, and Wiza) and obtained the use of the Knights of Columbus gym. Cannon turned his attention to softball in 1934 and the following year the Crimson Coach Tobaccos won the world amateur softball championship. Crimson Coach's final basketball game occurred on January 2, 1935, when a team of former Red Man and Crimson Coach players assembled by Cannon lost to the Brooklyn Jewels 21–20.

== Year-by-year ==
Year	League	Reg. season	Playoffs
1929–30	NPBL (I)	1st (1st half); 2nd (2nd half)	Champion (Won NPBL championship 4–2 over Dayton Kellys)
1930–31	ABL	4th (1st half); 5th (2nd half)	Did not qualify
1932–33	NPBL (II)	2nd	Lost NPBL championship 0–3 to Akron Firestone Non-Skids
