= Abe Yourist =

Russian-American basketball player (1909–1991)

Personal information
- Born: September 9, 1909 Russia
- Died: November 9, 1991 (aged 82) Seattle, Washington, U.S.
- Listed height: 6 ft 1 in (1.85 m)
- Listed weight: 210 lb (95 kg)

Career information
- High school: Woodward (Toledo, Ohio)
- College: Heidelberg (1929–1932)
- Position: Center

Career history
- 1932–1933: Toledo Crimson Coaches
- 19??–19??: Babe Deidrickson's All Stars
- 1941: Toledo Jim White Chevrolets

Abe Harry Yourist (September 9, 1909 – November 9, 1991) was a Russian-American professional basketball player. He played one game for the Toledo Jim White Chevrolets in the National Basketball League during the 1941–42 season. In college, Yourist lettered in football, basketball, baseball, and track for Heidelberg University in Tiffin, Ohio.

Yourist was also a professional wrestler for many years, including under the pseudonyms "Pepper Gomez" and the "Masked Marvel". He retired from wrestling around 1970 and also worked for Fenton Aluminum Sash in the Seattle area for 22 years. Yourist had lived in Seattle since 1948.
