= Ike Mahoney =

American football player (1901–1961)

No. 4
- Position: Back

Personal information
- Born: October 15, 1901; Omaha, Nebraska, U.S.
- Died: November 21, 1961 (aged 60); Omaha, Nebraska, U.S.
- Listed height: 5 ft 9 in (1.75 m)
- Listed weight: 173 lb (78 kg)

Career information
- High school: Omaha
- College: Creighton (1921–1924)

Career history
- Chicago Cardinals (1925–1928, 1931)

Awards and highlights
- NFL champion (1925)
- Stats at Pro Football Reference

Frank John Mahoney Jr. (October 25, 1901 – November 21, 1961) was an American professional football back who played five seasons with the Chicago Cardinals of the National Football League (NFL). He played college football at Creighton University. He was a member of the Cardinals team that were NFL champions in 1925.

== Early life ==
Frank John Mahoney Jr. was born on October 25, 1901, in Omaha, Nebraska. He attended Commercial High School in Omaha. He was a team captain in football, basketball, baseball, and also participated in track in high school. Mahoney helped Commerce win the Class A state basketball championship. He played in four state basketball tournaments from 1918 to 1921 and scored 141 points total during them, which was the state record for 34 years. He was also the first Nebraska basketball player ever to earn all-state honors three times. Mahoney was a one-time all-state selection in football as well. In baseball, he only lost two games as a starting pitcher. He also won a state medal in track. Mahoney graduated in 1921. He was later inducted into the Nebraska High School Sports Hall of Fame.

== College career ==
Mahoney initially announced he would be attending the University of Notre Dame but later enrolled at Creighton College. He played college football and basketball for the Creighton Bluejays from 1921 to 1924. He was an end and quarterback in football and a center and forward in basketball. The Blue Jays had a four-year basketball record of 58–14.

== Professional career ==
Mahoney signed with the Chicago Cardinals of the National Football League (NFL) in 1925. He played in seven games, starting four, during his rookie year, scoring one extra point and one receiving touchdown. The Cardinals were named NFL champions after finishing first in the league with an 11–2–1. Mahoney appeared in 11 games, starting eight, during the 1926 season, recording one rushing touchdown, one fumble recovery touchdown, and one extra point. He played in nine games, starting three, in 1927. He appeared in five games, starting two, in 1928 and became a free agent after the season. Mahoney returned to the Cardinals in 1931 and played in one game for them that year.

Mahoney also played for the Chicago Bruins of the American Basketball League. He played minor league baseball in the Pittsburgh Pirates organization as well.

== Personal life ==
Mahoney was the head football coach at St. Leo's High School in Chicago from 1928 to 1930, accumulating an overall record of 14–7–3. His personal finances were hurt by the Wall Street crash of 1929 and Mahoney moved back to Omaha in 1931. He became county commissioner in 1932.

Mahoney lived and worked at Boys Town from 1947 until his death, spending time as the coordinator of intramural athletics, equipment manager, and postmaster. He died on November 21, 1961, in Omaha.
