= Jack Tierney =

American basketball player and coach

Personal information
- Born: August 3, 1893 Chicago, Illinois, U.S.
- Died: May 12, 1968 (aged 74) Bellwood, Illinois, U.S.
- Listed height: 5 ft 9 in (1.75 m)
- Listed weight: 165 lb (75 kg)
- Position: Forward

Career history

Playing
- 1912–1913: Seward Park Meteors
- 1913–1916: Illinois Athletic Club
- 1916–1917: Chicago West Side Browns
- 1917–1922: Chicago
- 1922–1924: Chicago Barry Council
- 1924–1928: Chicago Bruins
- 1924–1925: Evanston Elks
- 1925: Chicago Clover Athletic Association
- 1927–1928: Chicago Nationals
- 1927–1929: Chicago
- 1929–1930: Chicago Majestics
- 1929–1930: Chicago Warriors

Coaching
- 1922–1923: Loyola–Chicago
- 1929–1930: Chicago Majestics
- 1934–1941: St. George HS
- 1941–1942: Chicago Bruins
- 1944–1945: Chicago American Gears
- 1945–1946: De La Salle Institute

John Joseph "Jack" Tierney (August 3, 1893 – May 12, 1968) was an early American basketball player and coach. He was involved in the sport at all levels of his era, from high schools and college to independent leagues, as well the American Basketball League to the National Basketball League.

A native of Chicago, Illinois, Tierney stayed in the city's metropolitan area throughout his career. From 1929 to 1930, he was a player-coach for the Chicago Majestics, an independent team.

Some sources have Tierney playing minor league baseball, including a stint on the Bloomington Bloomers in the III League (1925).
