= Syracuse All-Americans =

Defunct American basketball team based in Syracuse, New York

The Syracuse All-Americans were an American basketball team based in Syracuse, New York that was a member of the American Basketball League (ABL).

In their only season of existence, the team dropped out of the league during the first half of the season on 6 January 1930, and forfeited their final four games for that half of the season in the process.

== Year-by-year ==
Year	League	Reg. season	Playoffs
1929/30	ABL	7th (1st half)	N/A
