= Laurie Walquist =

American football player and coach (1898–1985)

Profile
- Position: Quarterback

Personal information
- Born: March 9, 1898; Rockford, Illinois, U.S.
- Died: September 28, 1985 (aged 87); Glenview, Illinois, U.S.

Career information
- College: Illinois

Career history
- 1922, 1924–1931: Chicago Bears

Awards and highlights
- First-team All-Big Ten (1921)

Lawrence Wilfred Walquist (March 9, 1898 – September 28, 1985) was an American professional football player who played quarterback for nine seasons for the Chicago Bears. He was also the first-ever head coach for the Chicago Bruins back when they originally played for the American Basketball League.

Walquist attended Rockford Central High School where he played both basketball and football. He graduated in 1918. Laurie served in the United States Army in 1918 and while he was accepted at West Point, he chose to attend the University of Illinois at Urbana–Champaign.

He graduated from Illinois in 1922 receiving a BS in economics. During his collegiate years, he was President of the Junior Class, member of Ma-Wan-Dee, and belonged to Tau Kappa Epsilon and Alpha Kappa Psi fraternities.

Walquist starred in basketball in 1919–20, 1920–21, 1921–22 and was picked as All-Conference guard in 1922. Additionally, he won four letters in football, was captain in 1921 and played right halfback and quarterback under Robert Zuppke. He was picked for All-Conference and All-Western in 1919 and 1920.

Walquist played with the Chicago Bears for nine season (1922, 1924–1931) and continued with the team through the mid-1930s as an assistant coach along with Paddy Driscoll under head coach George Halas.
