= New York Hakoahs =

The New York Hakoahs were an American basketball team based in New York, New York that was a member of the American Basketball League. The Hakoahs were predominantly Jewish and were coached by Nat Holman. "Hakoahs" comes from the Hebrew word for "strength."

== Year-by-year ==
Year	League	Reg. season	Playoffs
1928/29	ABL	5th (1st half); 5th (2nd half)	Did not qualify
