= Pip Koehler =

American baseball and basketball player (1902-1986)

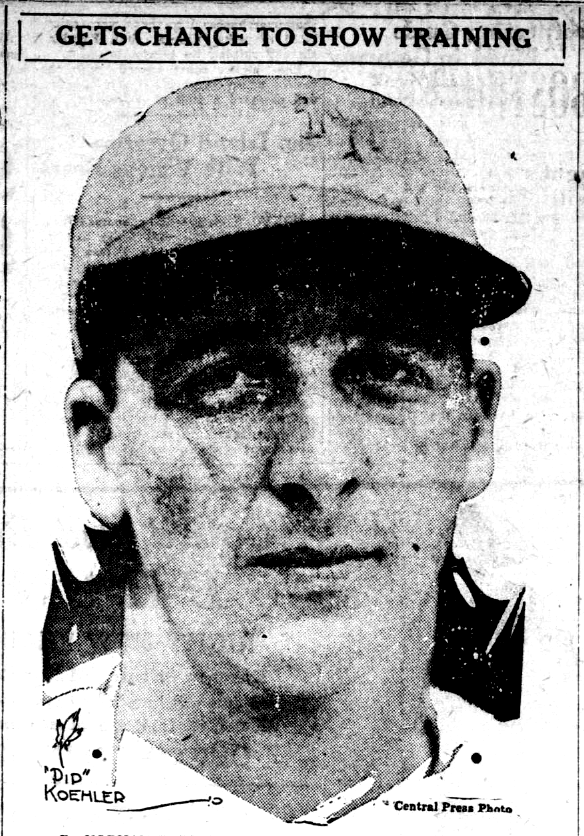
- Outfielder
- Born: January 16, 1902; Gilbert, Pennsylvania, U.S.
- Died: December 8, 1986 (aged 84); Tacoma, Washington, U.S.
- Batted: Right Threw: Right

MLB debut
- April 22, 1925, for the New York Giants

Last MLB appearance
- September 12, 1925, for the New York Giants

MLB statistics
- Batting average: .000
- Home runs: 0
- RBI: 0
- Stats at Baseball Reference

Teams
- New York Giants (1925)

Horace Levering "Pip" Koehler (January 16, 1902 – December 8, 1986) was an American Major League Baseball outfielder and professional basketball player.

== Baseball ==
Koehler played only one season (1925) with the New York Giants. He was a small athlete at 5 ft 10 in (1.78 m), 165 pounds, who threw and batted right-handed. Koehler attended Penn State University. On April 22, 1925, Koehler made his big league debut at the age of 23. He ended up appearing in only 12 games and collecting 2 at-bats. He struck out once and scored one run, but didn't collect a single hit. Used primarily as a pinch runner, Koehler was flawless in the field. He played his final game on September 12, 1925. Koehler died on December 8, 1986. He was interred in Calvary Cemetery in Tacoma, Washington.

== Basketball ==
While playing for the Toledo Mud Hens, Koehler was also the player-coach of the Toledo Red Man Tobaccos. In 1930, he led the Red Man to the National Professional Basketball League championship.
