= The Field House (University of Toledo) =

Athletic facility in Toledo, Ohio

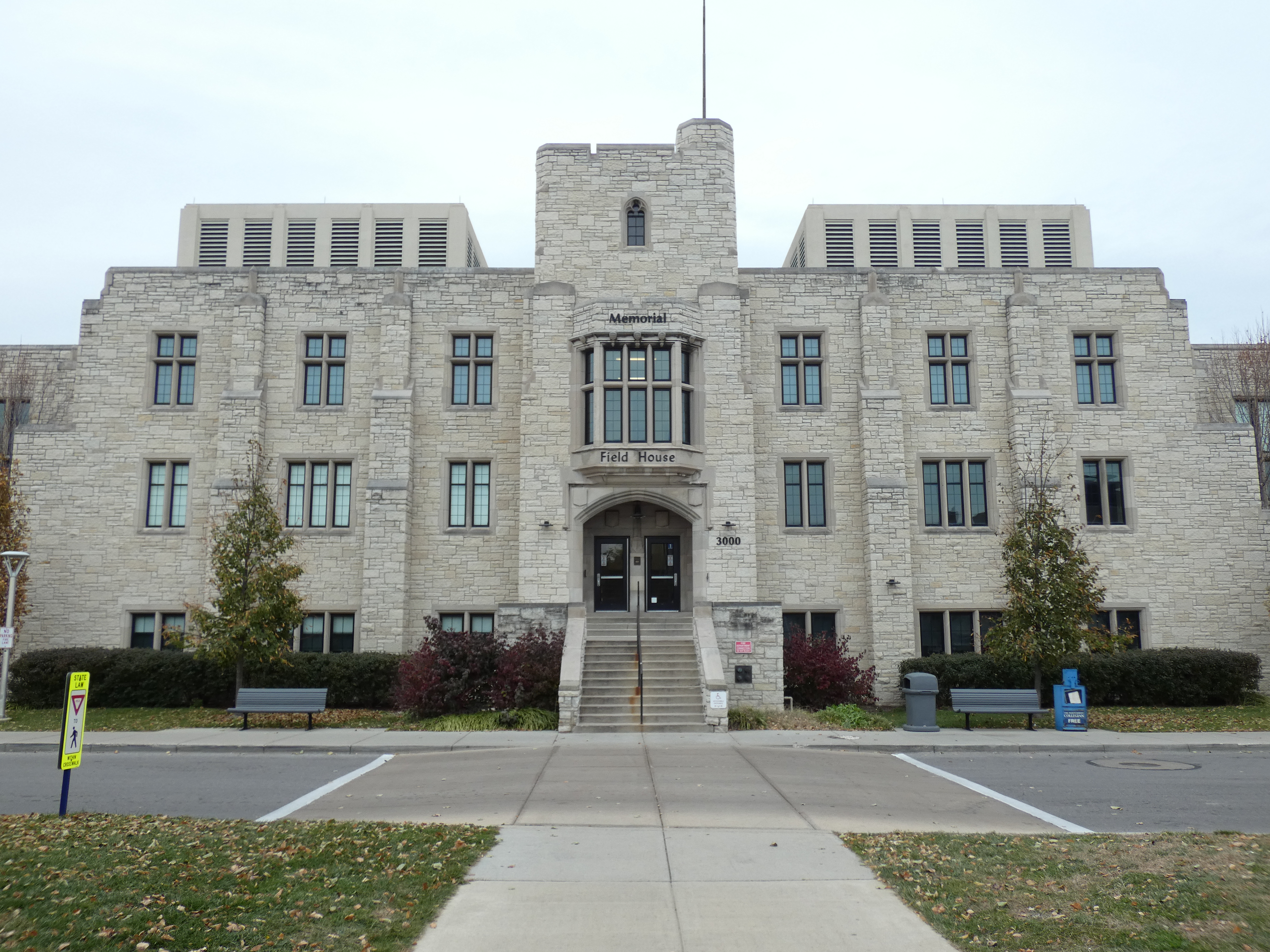
- Location: 3000 West Centennial Drive; Toledo, Ohio, United States
- Owner: University of Toledo
- Operator: University of Toledo
- Capacity: 2,000 (1931–1936); 6,000 (1937–1950); 5,000 (1950–1960); 4,100 (1960–1976)

Construction
- Groundbreaking: March 1930
- Opened: February 13, 1931; Re-opened 2008
- Closed: 1976; Remodeled 2006
- Cost: 1931 $470,000; 2006 $27 million
- Architects: 1931 Mills, Rhines, Bellman, and Nordhoff, Inc; 2006 BHDP Architecture

Tenants
- Toledo Rockets men's basketball (NCAA) (1931–1976); Toledo Jeeps (NBL) (1946–1948)

The Field House is a former athletic facility on the campus of the University of Toledo in Toledo, Ohio, United States, that was closed in 1976 and remodeled in 2008.

== Construction ==
Made from Wisconsin Lannon stone, construction of the building took place between March, 1930 and January, 1931 on land owned by the university. The cost of construction was approximately $470,000. The Field House was the second building constructed on the present UT campus. The facility covered more than an acre of ground, utilized a dirt floor and seated only 2,000 spectators around an elevated wooden basketball court. The building also contained two gymnasiums devoted to men's and women's physical education classes.

== Usage ==
The primary use for the gymnasium was a location that could be utilized for men's and women's physical education courses as well as being the facility for the Toledo Rockets men's basketball team to compete. Additionally, the venue was utilized for social and academic functions including commencement ceremonies. Although its main use was a gymnasium for basketball it held some very iconic speakers and bands. Some famous people that spoke in the Field House included politicians Barry M. Goldwater as well as President Richard Nixon. Additionally, some famous bands and singers performed in the Field House including Pink Floyd, Jimi Hendrix, Kenny Rogers, The J. Geils Band, The Kingston Trio, Hall and Oates, The Beach Boys, Simon and Garfunkel and also The Byrds.

== Remodel ==
Upon completion of Centennial Hall in 1976, The Field House became obsolete and became underutilized becoming a storage facility for the campus for nearly 20 years. In 2006, however, facing a burst in student enrollment, an expansion of program offerings, and concern about future space needs, the university commissioned a major overhaul that, three years later, recast the 134,200 square foot gymnasium into a learning environment housing classrooms, teaching labs, faculty offices, and space for future growth. Construction began in July, 2007, with the demolition of the old interior and extensive cleanup effort on the exterior brickwork commencing in December. In a span of 10 months, and the addition of a second and third floor, the result was a $27 million renovation, with 54 classrooms, 70 offices, and a 250-seat auditorium.
