= America's Best Chew =

Brand of chewing tobacco

- Type: Private
- Industry: Chewing tobacco
- Founded: 1904; 122 years ago
- Headquarters: Owensboro, Kentucky, United States
- Website: americasbestchew.com

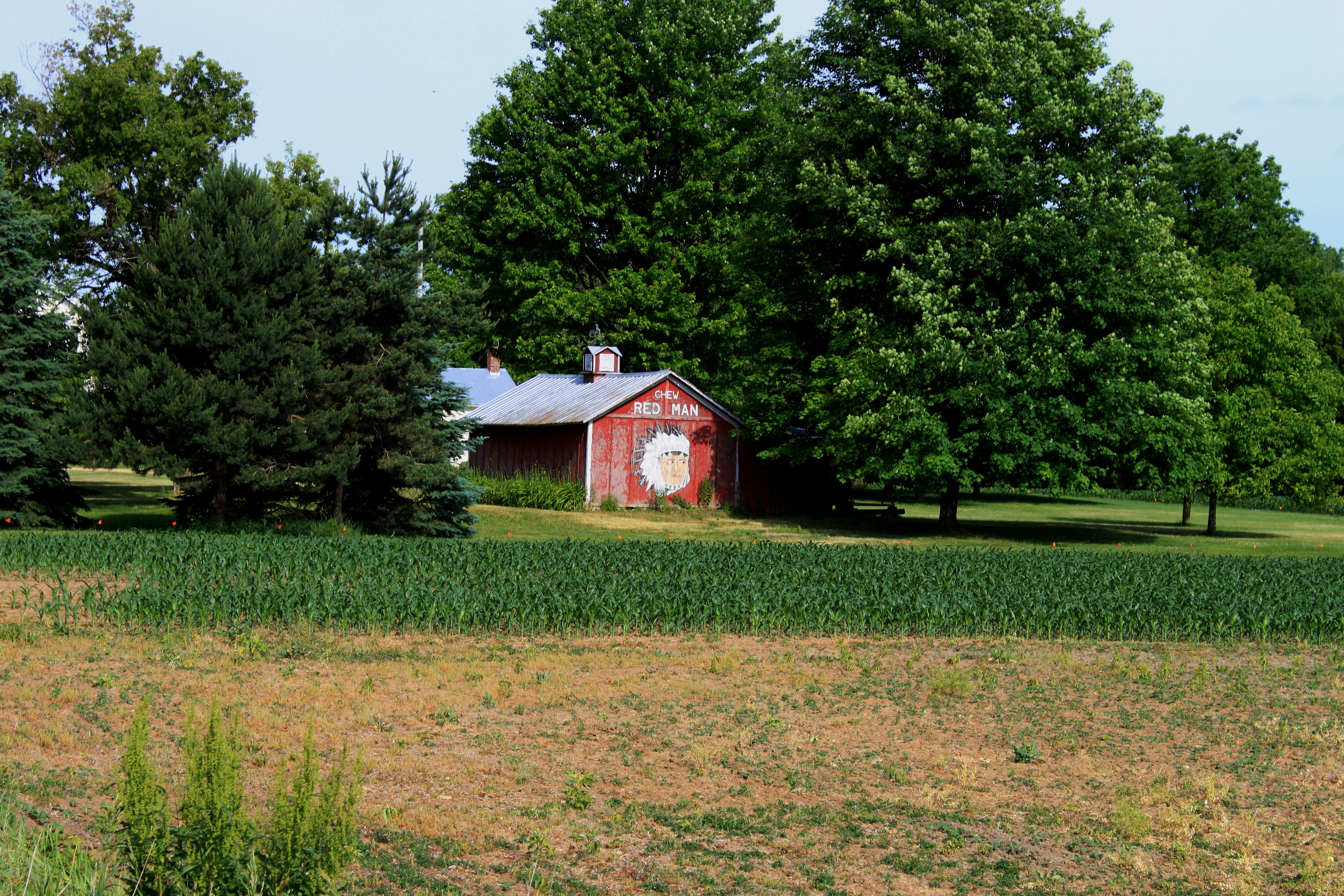
Barn painted with Red Man advertisement, Macon Township, Michigan

America's Best Chew (formerly Red Man) is an American brand of chewing tobacco introduced in 1904.

Red Man traditionally came as leaf tobacco, in contrast to twist chewing tobacco or the ground tobacco used in snuff. It is made by the Pinkerton Tobacco company of Owensboro, Kentucky. In 1985, Pinkerton was acquired by a Swedish corporation, and after further corporate reshuffling, the brand fell under the umbrella of the Swedish Match company, which in turn was owned primarily by institutional investors. The proportion owned by non-Swedish investors was approximately 80%.

In October 2022, the European Commission approved Philip Morris International’s proposed acquisition of Swedish Match, subject to conditions including the divestiture of Swedish Match’s logistics arm SMD Logistics, to address competition concerns in Sweden. In February 2023, Swedish Match was acquired to 100% and was registered in the share registry on 28 February 2023.

== History ==
The Red Man brand was introduced in 1904 by Pinkerton Tobacco (incorporated in 1901).

Red Man was initially sold in a few Midwestern states; it expanded in 1954 into the South, and then in 1963 largely nationwide. The corporation's marketing material describes Red Man's consumer base: "A large number of consumers work outdoors and enjoy hunting, fishing and watch [sic] auto racing." Contemporary materials from Swedish Match also suggest that the brand name came from something of an homage to American Indians.

In January 2022, parent company Swedish Match announced that they would be changing brand's name to "America's Best Chew" and removing the depiction of a Native American chief on its packaging. Industry trade press reported that the rebrand was presented as aligning with Swedish Match’s contemporary values and that the product itself was unchanged while packaging transitioned in the following weeks.

== Advertising ==
Early in its history, Red Man advertisements were painted on the sides of barns, featuring an endorsement from baseball player Nap Lajoie: "Lajoie chews Red Man, ask him if he don't." During the 1920s and 30s, the company sponsored a professional basketball team – the Toledo Red Man Tobaccos. Marketing tie-ins with rural and outdoor sports have been a hallmark of the Red Man brand. From 1952 to 1955, Red Man produced a series of baseball cards, the only tobacco company to do so after 1920. The sets are valuable due to the appearance of 25 of the top players of 1952–55, including Stan Musial, Yogi Berra and Willie Mays.

In 1982, Red Man launched its first TV advertising ever, produced by the ad agency Benton & Bowles. This decision came after Levi Garrett's aggressive entrance into the chewing tobacco market in the United States.

Since then, the brand has sponsored competitive events including the "Red Man All-American Pulling Series", a tractor pulling circuit, and the "Red Man All-American Bass Championship", a fishing competition. In 1991, under pressure from the Federal Trade Commission, which was enforcing a 1986 U.S. statute banning television ads for smokeless tobacco, Red Man agreed to stop displaying its "product logo, selling message or the color or design of the tobacco product or its package" during televised coverage of the tractor pulls. The competitive fishing circuit that culminated in the Bass Championship was sponsored by the company and called the "Red Man Tournament Trail" from 1983 to 2000, after which Walmart took over as the name sponsor.

== Flavors and varieties ==
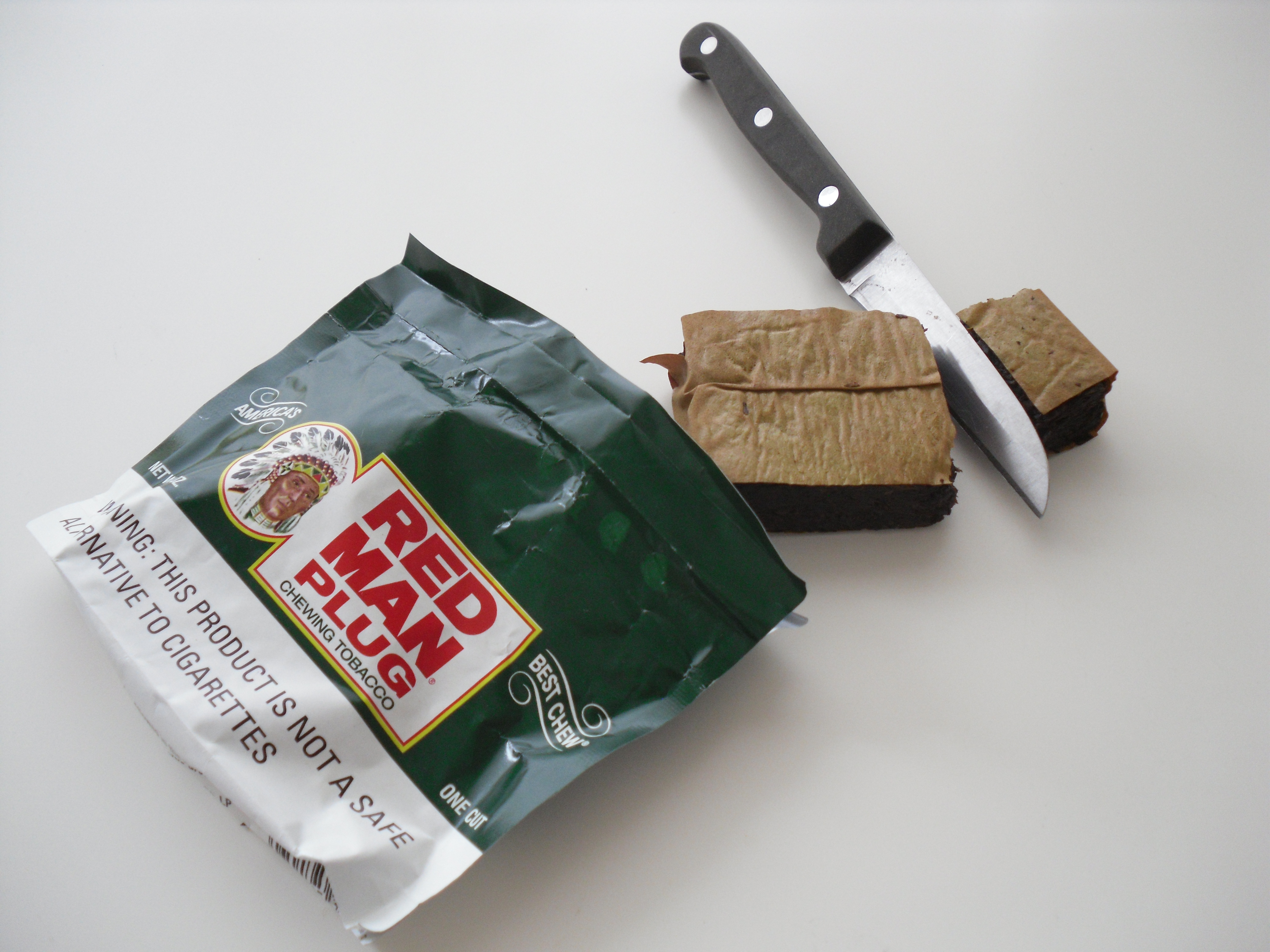
Red Man Plug chewing tobacco

- Golden Blend
- Select
- America's Best Chew Silver Blend
- Original
- Plug

=== Dipping tobacco ===
- America's Best Chew Cut Natural
- America's Best Chew Long Cut Straight
- Red Man Long Cut Wintergreen (discontinued in 2021)
