= Geva Theatre Center =

Theatre in Rochester, New York

- Naval Armory-Convention Hall
- U.S. National Register of Historic Places
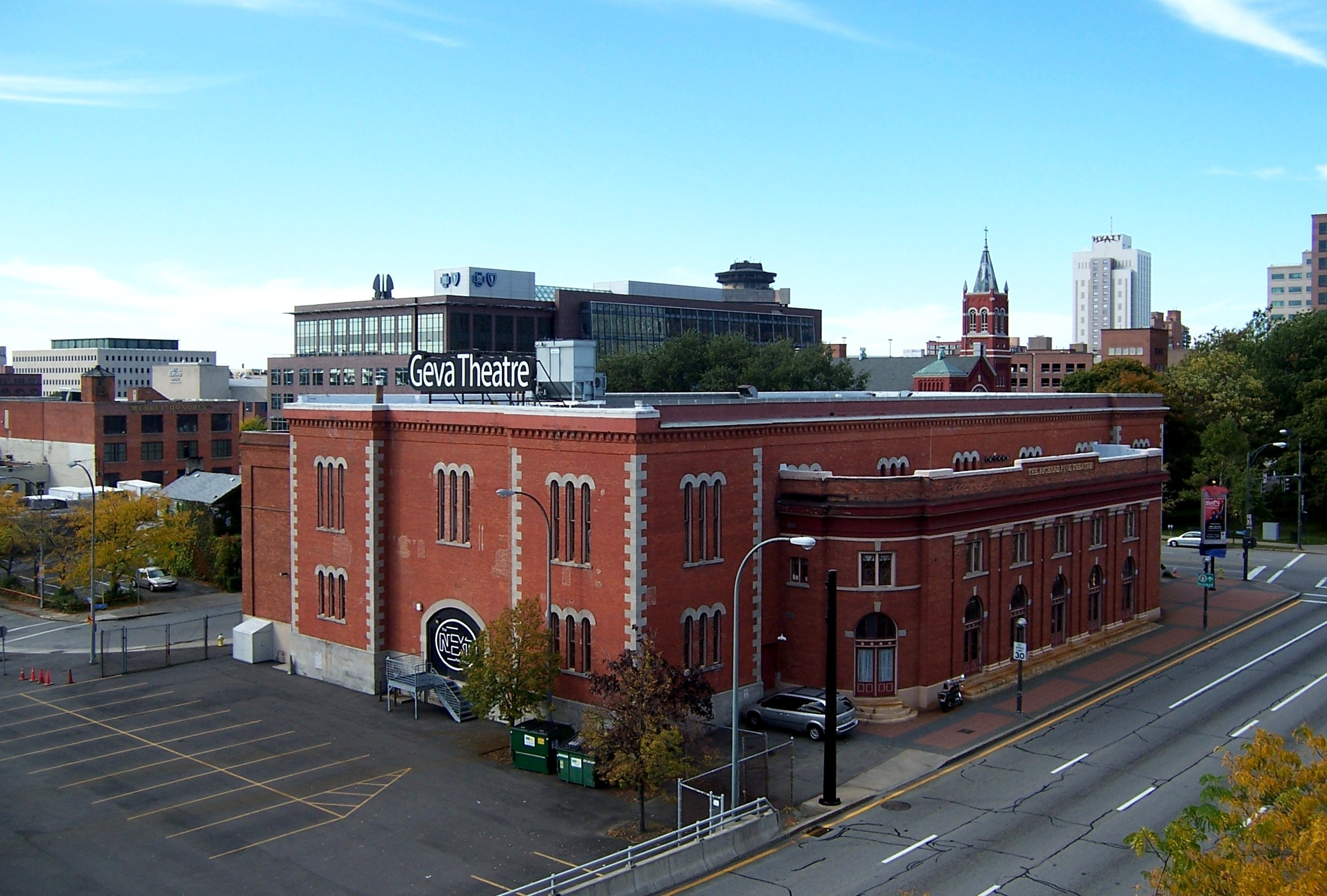
- Rear-angle view of the theatre building

- Location within New York
- Location: Rochester, NY
- Coordinates: 43°9′7.89″N 77°36′18.66″W
- Built: 1868
- Architect: Warner, Andrew J.; Gorsline & Aldridge
- Architectural style: Classical Revival, Late Victorian
- MPS: Inner Loop MRA
- NRHP reference No.: 85002852
- Added to NRHP: October 4, 1985

Geva Theatre Center is a regional, not-for-profit, professional theatre company based in Rochester, New York. It is housed in an 1868 building, listed on the National Register of Historic Places, located in Rochester at 75 Woodbury Boulevard near High Falls. The Center has full seasons of programming, in addition to discussions based on plays and staged readings, and community outreach.

== The Company ==
In 1972, William Markham Selden and Cynthia Mason Selden, a British actress, residents of nearby Avon, co-founded GeVa, an abbreviation for "Genesee Valley Arts Foundation" and its associated theatre company. The company's first shows were short dramas produced at lunchtime in 1973 at the Rochester Business Institute (RBI). Programming expanded to full-length plays and it became a regional theatre company ranked with similar companies, including those of Buffalo and Syracuse. In 1997, the name of the company was changed to Geva Theatre Center, dropping the CamelCase formatting. In 2011, Geva Theatre Center hosted the 2011 American Association of Community Theatre Festival. By 2017, it was recognized as the best-attended theatre in New York State outside of New York City.

Actors appearing at GeVa in the early years included Samuel L. Jackson (in A Raisin in the Sun), Scott Bakula, and Georgia Engel. Others who have graced the Geva stage include Kathy Bates, Josh Brolin, Robert Downey Jr., Carla Gugino, Bill Pullman, Anna Deavere Smith, Robert Vaughn, and Anthony Zerbe. Among Geva's contributors are Academy Award winners and nominees, Tony Award winners and nominees, Drama Desk Award winners and nominees, Emmy Award winners and nominees, and a Pulitzer Prize nominee. Rochester native Philip Seymour Hoffman often cited Geva Theatre in interviews. He would speak of his mother taking him to plays at Geva and how that sparked his interest in acting.

As of 2018, Geva had presented more than 400 stage productions, as well as other events.

World Premieres:

- Five Course Love by Gregg Coffin (2004);
- Splitting Infinity by Jamie Pachino (2006);
- Pride and Prejudice by Jane Austen, adapted by Mark Cuddy and Marge Betley (2008);
- The House in Hydesville by Dan O'Brien (2009);
- A Christmas Carol by Charles Dickens, adapted by Mark Cuddy, original music & lyrics by Gregg Coffin (2010);
- Voices of the Spirits in My Soul by Nora Cole (2012);
- The Book Club Play by Karen Zacarias (2013);
- All Your Questions Answered by Greg Kotis (2013);
- Tinker to Evers to Chance by Mat Smart (2014);
- Informed Consent by Deborah Zoe Laufer (2014);
- Katherine's Colored Lieutenant by Nora Cole (2014);
- The Road to Where by Cass Morgan (2015);
- Women in Jeopardy by Wendy MacLeod (2015);
- Other Than Honorable by Jamie Pachino (2017);
- The Agitators by Mat Smart (2017);
- Heartland by Gabriel Jason Dean (2018);
- Hard Cell by Brent Askari (2019).

== Leadership ==
Geva's current Artistic Director is Elizabeth Williamson. She joined the company in June 2022, succeeding Mark Cuddy, who retired after serving in the role for 27 years.

== Building ==
Geva was originally housed in a building located at 168 South Clinton Avenue, then the Rochester Business Institute building, but by 1982, its expansion to a "full-fledged company" meant that it needed an improved facility. Toward that end, it purchased a former armory and convention hall at 75 Woodbury Boulevard, diagonally across the street from the RBI building.

The newly-acquired building had been designed in 1868 by Rochester Architect Andrew J. Warner and was first occupied by the 54th Regiment of the New York State Militia. In 1907, additions and renovations were made and the building became known as the Convention Hall. As such, it hosted such notable political figures as William Jennings Bryan, William Howard Taft, Theodore Roosevelt, and Franklin Delano Roosevelt. It was also a cultural center for Rochester, with appearances by world renowned artists such as Anna Pavlova, Enrico Caruso, Fritz Kreisler, Sergei Rachmaninoff, Gustav Mahler, Sir Arthur Conan Doyle, and Arturo Toscanini. Other events included wrestling and boxing matches, flower shows, and dog shows. The building was used as a hospital during the 1918 flu epidemic and as a tonsil clinic in 1930. In 1949, the building became the Naval Reserve Center and by 1975 it housed offices for several departments of the City of Rochester.

After buying the building from the city in 1982, Geva began three years of renovations and the building re-opened as a theatre on 29 March 1985. The new theatre's first production was Planet Fires, a drama by Thomas Babe, a Rochester playwright. Featuring a newly freed black man and a Union deserter who have traveled North together, the play was set soon after the Civil War at a campground near Rochester. On 26 November 1985, the new facility was dedicated as the Richard Pine Theatre, in honor of a local developer who had arranged the financing that made Geva's move possible.

In 1997, Geva undertook a major development campaign that included construction of a second stage in the building. The 180-seat Nextstage, subsequently known as the Ron & Donna Fielding Stage, opened in 2000. It is intended for smaller-scale, more intimate productions, theatre for young audiences, and development of new plays. The original, larger theatre space was then called the Mainstage and later the Elaine P. Wilson Stage. The 522-seat Wilson Stage is used for a wide variety of performances, including American and world classics, new plays, and musicals.

In 2016, Geva completed a seven-year project that included exterior rehabilitation and interior infrastructure work as well as renovations to rehearsal and conference rooms, administrative offices, green rooms, dressing rooms, and the lobby and café areas. In addition, a new entertainment suite was created, new seats and carpeting were installed in the Wilson Stage, and new flooring was added in the Fielding Stage.

The building was listed on the National Register of Historic Places on 4 October 1985 under the name "Naval Armory-Convention Hall".
