= Rochester Centrals =

Defunct American basketball team based in Rochester, New York

The Rochester Centrals were an American basketball team based in Rochester, New York that was a member of the American Basketball League (ABL). They played at the Main Street Armory, when it was still in use as a military training facility.

The club would make it to the 1929–30 ABL Finals, but would lose the championship series to the Cleveland Rosenblums 4–1 by losing four straight games after winning their first match against Cleveland.

== Year-by-year ==
Year	League	Gp	W	L	Pct.	Reg. season	Playoffs
1925/26	ABL					4th (1st half); 3rd (2nd half)	Did not qualify
1926/27	ABL					6th (1st half); 7th (2nd half)	Did not qualify
1927/28	ABL					4th, Eastern	Did not qualify
1928/29	ABL					7th (1st half); 4th (2nd half)	Did not qualify
1929/30	ABL					3rd (1st half); 1st (2nd half)	Finals
1930/31	ABL					3rd (1st half); 4th (2nd half)	Did not qualify
