= Chicago Bruins =

American basketball team

The Chicago Bruins were an American basketball team based in Chicago, Illinois. Owned by Chicago Bears football team owner George Halas (with fellow NFL team owner Charles Bidwill from the Chicago Cardinals also being involved as well, at least originally), the Bruins were a member of the American Basketball League, a league that also featured other National Football League team owners and run by NFL President Joseph Carr. Among the team's players were Bears quarterback Laurie Walquist and future Naismith Memorial Basketball Hall of Fame inductee Nat Holman.

The team later played in the National Basketball League (1939–1942) and World Professional Basketball Tournament. There is a misconception that the team that was the Chicago Bruins ended up becoming the Chicago Studebaker Flyers, with a further misconception that the Chicago franchise soon afterward became the Cleveland Chase Brassmen and Cleveland Allmen Transfers, with the latter team later becoming the Syracuse Nationals, who currently exist as the Philadelphia 76ers of the present-day National Basketball Association.

== Standings ==
Year	League	Record	Reg. season	Playoffs
1925–26	ABL	9–22 (overall)	T-6th (1st half); 7th (2nd half)	Did not qualify
1926–27	ABL	13–29 (overall)	7th (1st half); T-6th (2nd half)	Did not qualify
1927–28	ABL	13–36	3rd (Western)	Did not qualify
1928–29	ABL	19–22 (overall)	T-3rd (1st half); 7th (2nd half)	Did not qualify
1929–30	ABL	29–25 (overall)	T-4th (1st half); 3rd (2nd half)	Did not qualify
1930–31	ABL	18–19 (overall)	5th (1st half); T-1st (2nd half)	Did not qualify (lost 1st place 2nd half tiebreaker)
No team from 1931–1939
1939–40	NBL	14–14	3rd (Western)	Did not qualify
1940–41	NBL	11–13	T-5th	Did not qualify
1941–42	NBL	8–15	6th	Did not qualify
