= 1936–37 New York / Brooklyn Jewels season =

- League: American Basketball League (revived original)
- Head coach: Eddie Wilde
- General manager: Eddie Wilde
- Owner(s): Eddie Wilde
- Arena: Arcadia Hall (New York/Brooklyn)

Results
- Record: 11–25 (.306)
- Place: Conference: 4th (1st half for New York); 6th (2nd half for Brooklyn)
- Playoff finish: Did not qualify

The 1936–37 New York / Brooklyn Jewels season was the sixth professional basketball season played by the New York Jewels franchise, which was their third season played while representing the state of New York as a whole instead of a specific city there like the city of Brooklyn, though it was also their fourth and final season of play for the Brooklyn Jewels team while representing the city of Brooklyn as well. Entering this season, the ABL would technically see six teams competing in their league throughout the entire season, though they wouldn't be the same six teams throughout the entire season due to the Atlantic City Sandpipers / Sand Snipers (who took over the spot held by the Passaic Red Devils at the time) being replaced by the New York Celtics (who technically would be related to the famous Original Celtics team) when going from the first half of the season to the second half of the season. Not only that, but the Jewels would (technically) end up rebranding themselves from the New York Jewels to their original Brooklyn Jewels name by the time the second half of the season officially began (potentially due to the aforementioned addition of the New York Celtics entering the ABL by the time the second half of the season began), meaning each half-season from this particular split season would be given out by two variations of the same team this time around. In this case, the first half of the season saw the New York Jewels get a below-average 7–10 to get a fourth place finish ahead of only the Paterson Visitations turned Brooklyn Visitations and the winless Atlantic City Sandpipers / Sand Snipers, while the Brooklyn Jewels got an even worse 4–15 record for a last place finish in the second half of the season. As such, not only would the Jewels fail to qualify for the ABL's championship series for this season, but the team would end up moving away from Brooklyn, New York into New Haven, Connecticut for at least the start of their upcoming season in the ABL.

== Roster ==
Due to information on American Basketball League players being generally hard to find, there are bound to be more gaps and/or inaccuracies found in certain areas on the team's roster spots than usual.

1936–37 New York / Brooklyn Jewels roster
Players

Pos.	No.	Player	Height	Weight	DOB	From
F/C		Matty Begovich	6 ft 5 in (1.96 m)	205 lb (93 kg)	1910-10-02	St. John's
G		Jules Bender	5 ft 11 in (1.80 m)	160 lb (73 kg)	1914-04-02	Long Island
F		Lou Bender	6 ft 1 in (1.85 m)	175 lb (79 kg)	1910-03-08	Columbia
G/F		Moe Dubilier	6 ft 2 in (1.88 m)	210 lb (95 kg)	1915-02-20	John Marshall University
F		Rip Gerson	5 ft 10 in (1.78 m)	165 lb (75 kg)	1906-04-06	St. John's
G		George Goldsmith	5 ft 9 in (1.75 m)	155 lb (70 kg)	1914-04-21	CCNY
C		Murray Heilweil	6 ft 3 in (1.91 m)	180 lb (82 kg)	1911-05-01	St. John's
G/F		Mac Kinsbrunner	5 ft 9 in (1.75 m)	155 lb (70 kg)	1909-03-21	St. John's
F		Ben Kramer	6 ft 1 in (1.85 m)	195 lb (88 kg)	1913-05-03	Long Island
G		Mickey Kupperberg	5 ft 11 in (1.80 m)	185 lb (84 kg)	1914-03-17	Minnesota
G		Venty Lieb	5 ft 9 in (1.75 m)	160 lb (73 kg)	1912-04-18	NYU
F		Leo Merson	6 ft 2 in (1.88 m)	175 lb (79 kg)	1915-04-30	Long Island
F		Ken Norton	6 ft 2 in (1.88 m)	200 lb (91 kg)	1914-05-07	Long Island
F/C		Jake Pelkington	6 ft 6 in (1.98 m)	220 lb (100 kg)	1916-01-03	Manhattan
G		Mac Posnack	5 ft 11 in (1.80 m)	195 lb (88 kg)	1909-06-23	St. John's
G/F		Honey Russell	5 ft 11 in (1.80 m)	175 lb (79 kg)	1911-09-10	St. John's
G/F		Allie Schuckman	5 ft 8 in (1.73 m)	155 lb (70 kg)	1907-11-25	St. John's
G		Willie Schwartz	6 ft 0 in (1.83 m)	195 lb (88 kg)	1911-04-06	Cornell
G/F		George Slott	5 ft 11 in (1.80 m)	185 lb (84 kg)	1912-06-09	St. John's
F		Sam Winograd	6 ft 0 in (1.83 m)	200 lb (91 kg)	1913-11-28	CCNY

Coaches
Head coach

Eddie Wilde

Legend
- (DP) Unsigned draft pick
- (FA) Free agent
- (S) Suspended
- Injured

== American Basketball League Standings ==
First Half
Team	Wins	Losses	Winning %
Jersey Reds	14	4	.778
Philadelphia SPHAs / Hebrews	12	6	.667
Kingston Colonials	11	6	.647
New York Jewels^{[a]}	7	10	.412
Paterson Visitations / Brooklyn Visitations^{[b]}	4	12	.250
Atlantic City Sandpipers / Sand Snipers^{[c]}	0	10	.000

Second Half
Team	Wins	Losses	Winning %
Philadelphia SPHAs / Hebrews	14	6	.700
Jersey Reds	12	8	.600
Brooklyn Visitations^{[b]}	10	9	.526
New York (Original) Celtics^{[d]}	10	10	.500
Kingston Colonials	9	11	.450
Brooklyn Jewels^{[a]}	4	15	.211

== Notes ==
^{a} Originally, the New York Jewels played as the New York Jewels for the first half of the season. However, by the start of the second half of the season, the team would rebrand themselves to the Brooklyn Jewels (likely because of the inclusion of the New York (Original) Celtics for the second half of the season following the departure of the Atlantic City Sandpipers / Sand Snipers near the end of the first half of the season) for the rest of that season only going forward.
^{b} The Brooklyn Visitations originally moved from Brooklyn, New York to Paterson, New Jersey to become the Paterson Visitations early on before the first half of the season began. However, by November 23, 1936, the Visitations would decide to move back from Paterson, New Jersey to Brooklyn, New York to become the Brooklyn Visitations once again for the rest of the season going forward.
^{c} After losing all ten of their regular season games in the first half of the season, the Atlantic City Sandpipers / Sand Snipers would drop out of the ABL entirely by December 21, 1936.
^{d} For the second half of the season, the New York (Original) Celtics would return to the ABL by entering the league for that specific half of the season by January 3, 1937, and playing in the ABL for the rest of the season going forward.
