= 1936–37 Atlantic City Sandpipers season =

- League: American Basketball League (revived original)
- Head coach: Herman "Chickie" Passon
- General manager: Herman "Chickie" Passon(?)
- Owner(s): Herman "Chickie" Passon(?)
- Arena: Million Dollar Pier

Results
- Record: 0–10 (.000)
- Place: Conference: 6th (1st half)
- Playoff finish: Did not qualify

The 1936–37 Atlantic City Sandpipers season was (technically considered) the first and only professional basketball season played by the Atlantic City Sandpipers (sometimes referred to as the Atlantic City Sand Snipers) franchise in Atlantic City, New Jersey under the revived original version of the American Basketball League. The reason why it's only considered the only professional basketball season played (in the ABL) by the Atlantic City franchise was because they technically appeared in the final season of what can be considered the original season of the Eastern Basketball League (which was an early professional basketball league from before the original ABL had even existed at the time) under the first half of the season there (having a 2–9 record under their own roster) before they were essentially replaced by the Naismith Basketball Hall of Fame Original Celtics franchise to have them take over for the rest of their time there as the Atlantic City Celtics instead before both the Atlantic City team and the Celtics were forced to leave due to the EBL trying to hardball them into a lesser deal than what was originally agreed upon at the time. However, this particular Atlantic City team would only show up for what would unofficially be considered the 1936 half of the season, as following a winless season of 10 games played by the Sandpipers, they would end up folding operations within the league on December 21, 1936. Not only that, but following the conclusion of the first half of the season, the Original Celtics, this time under the ownership of singer Kate Smith and talent manager Ted Collins, would decide to return to the ABL for the second half of the season (though they would be playing under the New York Celtics in this case), which would be the only time where the ABL would decide to add in a new team to start out a second half of a season on their ends after a team was lost in the first half of a season. Because the Sandpipers (sometimes referred to as the Sand Snipers) did not win a single game in the ABL this season, they have a reasonable case to be seen as the worst ABL team in the league's history alongside both the Brooklyn Arcadians and the Detroit Pulaski Post Five / Lions in 1926 alongside the Schenectady Packers in 1949, all of whom were similarly winless before they ended up folding operations in their seasons of play there (with the Schenectady Packers also failing to win a single ABL game before folding operations entirely on their ends similar to Atlantic City).

== Roster ==
Due to information on American Basketball League players being generally hard to find, there are bound to be more gaps and/or inaccuracies found in certain areas on the team's roster spots than usual.

Player	Position(s)
Gaza Chizmadia	F/C
Bud Clancy	F
Leon DeZube	G
Stan Entrup	C
Eddie Fredericks	F
Venty Leib	G
George MacMillan	C
Bill Miles	F/C
Charles Mosicant	F
Nat Passon	G
Willie Putzer	F
Rusty Saunders	F/C
Izzy Sherman	G
Eddie Taylor	G
Albie Weiner	G
Lou Wisner	G
Sam Winograd	F

== American Basketball League Standings ==
First Half
Team	Wins	Losses	Winning %
Jersey Reds	14	4	.778
Philadelphia SPHAs / Hebrews	12	6	.667
Kingston Colonials	11	6	.647
New York Jewels^{[a]}	7	10	.412
Paterson Visitations / Brooklyn Visitations^{[b]}	4	12	.250
Atlantic City Sandpipers / Sand Snipers^{[c]}	0	10	.000

Second Half
Team	Wins	Losses	Winning %
Philadelphia SPHAs / Hebrews	14	6	.700
Jersey Reds	12	8	.600
Brooklyn Visitations^{[b]}	10	9	.526
New York (Original) Celtics^{[d]}	10	10	.500
Kingston Colonials	9	11	.450
Brooklyn Jewels^{[a]}	4	15	.211

== Notes ==
^{a} Originally, the New York Jewels played as the New York Jewels for the first half of the season. However, by the start of the second half of the season, the team would rebrand themselves to the Brooklyn Jewels (likely because of the inclusion of the New York (Original) Celtics for the second half of the season following the departure of the Atlantic City Sandpipers / Sand Snipers near the end of the first half of the season) for the rest of that season only going forward.
^{b} The Brooklyn Visitations originally moved from Brooklyn, New York to Paterson, New Jersey to become the Paterson Visitations early on before the first half of the season began. However, by November 23, 1936, the Visitations would decide to move back from Paterson, New Jersey to Brooklyn, New York to become the Brooklyn Visitations once again for the rest of the season going forward.
^{c} After losing all ten of their regular season games in the first half of the season, the Atlantic City Sandpipers / Sand Snipers would drop out of the ABL entirely by December 21, 1936.
^{d} For the second half of the season, the New York (Original) Celtics would return to the ABL by entering the league for that specific half of the season by January 3, 1937 and playing in the ABL for the rest of the season going forward.
