= 1936–37 New York Celtics season =

Professional basketball season

- League: American Basketball League (revived original)
- Head coach: John "Pete" Barry (player-coach)
- General manager: Ted Collins(?)
- Owner(s): Kate Smith & Ted Collins
- Arena: New York Hippodrome

Results
- Record: 10–10 (.500)
- Place: Conference: 4th (2nd half)
- Playoff finish: Did not qualify (Played only one half and failed to qualify in said half.)

The 1936–37 New York (Original) Celtics season was (unofficially) considered the sixth professional basketball season ever held by the team that was known as the Original Celtics officially. It could also potentially be seen as (at least) the 22nd season of independent play as well for the Celtics, though it can reasonably be considered (at least) their 21st season properly due to the New York Hakoahs briefly replacing the Original Celtics entirely during the original era of the American Basketball League before it got revived in 1933 as a regional league instead of an entirely national league as the ABL had originally envisioned itself to be at the time. After previously folding operations back in the 1929–30 season and having Max Rosenblum try to revive the Original Celtics under his own moniker of the "Max Rosenblum Celtics", franchise co-owner Kate Smith (best known for her singing prowess) and her talent manager, Ted Collins, would end up taking over the Celtics franchise from Max Rosenblum and have the Original Celtics come back to both New York City and the ABL (now under its revived formatting), though their late entry into the ABL would result in them only being able to compete in the second half of the season instead of both halves of the season (which would be fine for the ABL's case after the Atlantic City Sandpipers / Sand Snipers would fold operations themselves after only 10 games played (all of which being losses on their ends). While the Celtics under Kate Smith's ownership (sometimes being referred to as the New York Kate Smith Celtics due to Kate Smith's team ownership in order to differentiate the Original Celtics of the past from the current Celtics team in question) had a chance to compete in the ABL's championship series due to them potentially winning the second half of the season thanks to the split season format held for this season, they ultimately failed to do so due to the Celtics having an average 10–10 for a fourth place second half finish, which had them be behind the Brooklyn Visitations (who had previously played a part of the first half of the season as the Paterson Visitations instead before returning to their home in Brooklyn), the first half champion Jersey Reds, and the eventual second half and overall ABL champion Philadelphia Sphas (who had returned to the ABL since its revival in 1933 under their original Sphas name after previously competing in the original iteration of the ABL as the Philadelphia Quakers / Warriors (later just being the original Philadelphia Warriors for the second and final season the Original Celtics had competed against in their final championship winning season in the ABL)).

== Roster ==
Due to information on American Basketball League players being generally hard to find, there are bound to be more gaps and/or inaccuracies found in certain areas on the team's roster spots than usual.

1936–37 New York (Original) Celtics roster
Players

Pos.	No.	Player	Height	Weight	DOB	From
G/F		Pete Barry	5 ft 11 in (1.80 m)	170 lb (77 kg)	1896-11-16	No college
F		Dave Bass	6 ft 1 in (1.85 m)	195 lb (88 kg)	1911-06-21	CCNY
G/F		Pete Berenson	5 ft 10 in (1.78 m)	180 lb (82 kg)	1912-10-16	CCNY
G		Carl Johnson	5 ft 8 in (1.73 m)	150 lb (68 kg)	1909-10-19	William L. Dickinson HS (NJ)
G		Rip Kaplinsky	5 ft 6 in (1.68 m)	150 lb (68 kg)	1912-11-13	St. John's
G		Syd Karp	5 ft 10 in (1.78 m)	180 lb (82 kg)	1910	Fordham
C		Al Kellett	6 ft 3 in (1.91 m)	210 lb (95 kg)	1901-10-30	Columbia
F		Ben Kramer	6 ft 1 in (1.85 m)	195 lb (88 kg)	1913-05-03	Long Island
F/C		Jack McGuirk	6 ft 3 in (1.91 m)	170 lb (77 kg)	1915-11-08	Manhattan
F		Jimmy McNally	6 ft 2 in (1.88 m)	170 lb (77 kg)	1913-03-09	Manhattan
G		Milt Trupin	5 ft 10 in (1.78 m)	170 lb (77 kg)	1909-09-05	CCNY

Coaches
Head coach

John "Pete" Barry

Legend
- (DP) Unsigned draft pick
- (FA) Free agent
- (S) Suspended
- Injured

== American Basketball League Standings ==
First Half
Team	Wins	Losses	Winning %
Jersey Reds	14	4	.778
Philadelphia SPHAs / Hebrews	12	6	.667
Kingston Colonials	11	6	.647
New York Jewels^{[a]}	7	10	.412
Paterson Visitations / Brooklyn Visitations^{[b]}	4	12	.250
Atlantic City Sandpipers / Sand Snipers^{[c]}	0	10	.000

Second Half
Team	Wins	Losses	Winning %
Philadelphia SPHAs / Hebrews	14	6	.700
Jersey Reds	12	8	.600
Brooklyn Visitations^{[b]}	10	9	.526
New York (Original) Celtics^{[d]}	10	10	.500
Kingston Colonials	9	11	.450
Brooklyn Jewels^{[a]}	4	15	.211

== Notes ==
^{a} Originally, the New York Jewels played as the New York Jewels for the first half of the season. However, by the start of the second half of the season, the team would rebrand themselves to the Brooklyn Jewels (likely because of the inclusion of the New York (Original) Celtics for the second half of the season following the departure of the Atlantic City Sandpipers / Sand Snipers near the end of the first half of the season) for the rest of that season only going forward.
^{b} The Brooklyn Visitations originally moved from Brooklyn, New York to Paterson, New Jersey to become the Paterson Visitations early on before the first half of the season began. However, by November 23, 1936, the Visitations would decide to move back from Paterson, New Jersey to Brooklyn, New York to become the Brooklyn Visitations once again for the rest of the season going forward.
^{c} After losing all ten of their regular season games in the first half of the season, the Atlantic City Sandpipers / Sand Snipers would drop out of the ABL entirely by December 21, 1936.
^{d} For the second half of the season, the New York (Original) Celtics would return to the ABL by entering the league for that specific half of the season by January 3, 1937 and playing in the ABL for the rest of the season going forward.
