= 1936–37 Paterson / Brooklyn Visitations season =

- League: American Basketball League (revived original)
- Head coach: John Donlon
- General manager: John Donlon
- Owner(s): Unknown (John Donlon?)
- Arena: Paterson Armory (Paterson Visitations); Grand Prospect Hall (Brooklyn Visitations)

Results
- Record: 14–21 (.400)
- Place: Conference: 5th (1st half); 3rd (2nd half)
- Playoff finish: Did not qualify

The 1936–37 Paterson / Brooklyn Visitations season was their sixteenth professional basketball season in Brooklyn, New York, as well as their fourth season in what would be the revived version of the American Basketball League (though if one were to include the original ABL seasons they played in with the revived version of the ABL, the Visitations would appear in seven total seasons (six full total seasons) within the combined operations of the American Basketball League instead) and their only season where the team competed as the Paterson Visitations in Paterson, New Jersey. Much like most other seasons played within the ABL, this season would see the league operate in a split season format, with the league technically operating with seven teams competing throughout the entire season, though they would actually see a total of six teams operating within each half-season simply because the Atlantic City Sandpipers / Sand Snipers appeared during the first half of the season and the New York Celtics (who may or may not have had the same ties to the Original Celtics franchise of the past, depending on who was being asked) appeared as the replacement team for Atlantic City for the second half of the season. In any case, the Visitations franchise would, for some unknown reason (though likely for financial reasons), move their operations from Brooklyn, New York to Paterson, New Jersey to start out the season. However, after playing one home game in the city of Paterson on November 20, 1936 in a 39–31 loss to the Philadelphia SPHAs / Hebrews, the Visitations would end up moving back to Brooklyn, New York to become the Brooklyn Visitations once again for the rest of the season not long afterward. Despite the weird way the Visitations had done their first half of the season, they would still end up finishing that specific half of the season with a poor 4–12 record that had them ahead of only the aforementioned Atlantic City team that dropped out of the ABL after being winless in 10 straight games on December 21, 1936. Luckily for the Visitations, they would perform a lot better once the second half of the season began when they played all of their home games in Brooklyn going forward, to the point where they would even have an above-average 10–9 record to end that half of the season. However, they would still end up with a third place finish for that half of the season behind only the Jersey Reds and the defending ABL champion Philadelphia SPHAs / Hebrews, thus failing to qualify for the ABL championship series in the process. Following this season's conclusion, the Visitations would remain in Brooklyn for the rest of their existence going forward.

== Roster ==
Due to information on American Basketball League players being generally hard to find, there are bound to be more gaps and/or inaccuracies found in certain areas on the team's roster spots than usual.

1936–37 Paterson / Brooklyn Visitations roster
Players

Pos.	No.	Player	Height	Weight	DOB	From
F/C		Howie Bollerman	6 ft 8 in (2.03 m)	200 lb (91 kg)	1907-06-09	Colgate
F		Frank Conaty	6 ft 2 in (1.88 m)	164 lb (74 kg)	1909-12-30	No college
G		Larry Dodick	5 ft 8 in (1.73 m)	155 lb (70 kg)	1914-08-15	No college
G		Allie Esposito	5 ft 10 in (1.78 m)	165 lb (75 kg)	1914-03-23	New Utrecht HS (NY)
G/F		Nat Frankel	6 ft 0 in (1.83 m)	195 lb (88 kg)	1913-11-03	Brooklyn
G		Freddie Gerken	5 ft 9 in (1.75 m)	150 lb (68 kg)	1911-11-01	No college
G		Nat Lazar	5 ft 9 in (1.75 m)	155 lb (70 kg)	1906-01-28	St. John's
F/C		Dixie Lee	6 ft 0 in (1.83 m)	170 lb (77 kg)	1917	No college
G		Bobby McDermott	5 ft 11 in (1.80 m)	180 lb (82 kg)	1914-01-07	Flushing HS (NY)
G		Milt McDermott	6 ft 1 in (1.85 m)	200 lb (91 kg)	1911-10-23	Flushing HS (NY)
F		Frank McGuire	6 ft 0 in (1.83 m)	200 lb (91 kg)	1913-11-08	St. John's
G		Frank Moylan	6 ft 0 in (1.83 m)	160 lb (73 kg)	1913-07-06	No college
G		George Slott	5 ft 11 in (1.80 m)	185 lb (84 kg)	1912-06-09	St. John's
F/C		Bob Synnott	6 ft 3 in (1.91 m)	190 lb (86 kg)	1912-09-27	Theodore Roosevelt HS (NY)

Coaches
Head coach

John Donlon

Legend
- (DP) Unsigned draft pick
- (FA) Free agent
- (S) Suspended
- Injured

== American Basketball League Standings ==
First Half
Team	Wins	Losses	Winning %
Jersey Reds	14	4	.778
Philadelphia SPHAs / Hebrews	12	6	.667
Kingston Colonials	11	6	.647
New York Jewels^{[a]}	7	10	.412
Paterson Visitations / Brooklyn Visitations^{[b]}	4	12	.250
Atlantic City Sandpipers / Sand Snipers^{[c]}	0	10	.000

Second Half
Team	Wins	Losses	Winning %
Philadelphia SPHAs / Hebrews	14	6	.700
Jersey Reds	12	8	.600
Brooklyn Visitations^{[b]}	10	9	.526
New York (Original) Celtics^{[d]}	10	10	.500
Kingston Colonials	9	11	.450
Brooklyn Jewels^{[a]}	4	15	.211

== Notes ==
^{a} Originally, the New York Jewels played as the New York Jewels for the first half of the season. However, by the start of the second half of the season, the team would rebrand themselves to the Brooklyn Jewels (likely because of the inclusion of the New York (Original) Celtics for the second half of the season following the departure of the Atlantic City Sandpipers / Sand Snipers near the end of the first half of the season) for the rest of that season only going forward.
^{b} The Brooklyn Visitations originally moved from Brooklyn, New York to Paterson, New Jersey to become the Paterson Visitations early on before the first half of the season began. However, by November 23, 1936, the Visitations would decide to move back from Paterson, New Jersey to Brooklyn, New York to become the Brooklyn Visitations once again for the rest of the season going forward.
^{c} After losing all ten of their regular season games in the first half of the season, the Atlantic City Sandpipers / Sand Snipers would drop out of the ABL entirely by December 21, 1936.
^{d} For the second half of the season, the New York (Original) Celtics would return to the ABL by entering the league for that specific half of the season by January 3, 1937 and playing in the ABL for the rest of the season going forward.
