= 1943–44 Philadelphia Sphas season =

American basketball team season

- League: American Basketball League (revived original)
- Head coach: Eddie Gottlieb
- General manager: Eddie Gottlieb
- Owner(s): Eddie Gottlieb
- Arena: Broadwood Hotel

Results
- Record: 12–14 (.462)
- Place: Conference: 4th (1st half), 1st (2nd half)
- Playoff finish: Lost ABL championship 4–3 to the Wilmington Blue Bombers

The Philadelphia Sphas were an early, historical example of an American professional basketball team. The 1943–44 season was the eleventh season played in the now-revived American Basketball League by the Sphas, although they did play in the original rendition of the ABL from 1926 to 1928 as the Philadelphia Warriors, which had no relation to the later BAA franchise of the same name that now exists in the present day as the Golden State Warriors in the NBA. As such, when including the past history of the original ABL with the revived version of the ABL in 1933 following historical problems that related to the Great Depression near the end of 1931, this would technically be the seventeenth official season played by the original ABL properly, though this would officially be the 27th season of play for the Sphas franchise when including previous seasons where they played under names like the "Philadelphia YMHA"; the "Philadelphia Passon, Gottlieb, Black", the "Philadelphia Warriors"; and the "Philadelphia Hebrews".

== Background ==
The Sphas played in leagues around Philadelphia since 1917, but game-by-game records before the Sphas rejoined the ABL in 1933 are not (currently) available (at least, not to the general public if official game records did exist for the Sphas) and are therefore likely lost to time itself. After deciding to have their previous season of play actually utilize a full season of play instead of two half seasons due to them missing out on a championship playoff match-up from the season before that one, the ABL decided (for what would later become for the final time in its entire existence) to utilize the two half season formatting of play one last time, with the two best teams in each half-season later competing in a best-of-seven championship series this time around. Not only that, but similar to the previous season, due to the trying times of the World War II period at hand, the ABL would agree to terms with the rivaling NBL to prohibit the transfer of players between their two professional basketball leagues without due compensation in order to minimize the effects of many players joining the war effort during this period of time (with this agreement only now being held again without the inclusion of the minor league Connecticut State Basketball League, who had folded operations following the conclusion of the previous season of play).

Due to the ABL deciding to utilize the two half season formatting one more time instead of a full regular season format like they had done the previous season, teams in the ABL were given a lot more games to play in their official schedules than the varied amounts they had throughout the prior season despite not only having the same amount of teams for the first half of the season, but less teams entering the second half of the season by comparison to the previous season of play. With that being said, in the Sphas' quest to repeat as champions once again and become ABL champions for the seventh time in eleven overall seasons of play, their first half of the season would go about as poorly as it could have possibly gotten for them, as the Sphas finished the first half of the season with a very poor 4–10 record for a fourth place finish, placing only higher than the Brooklyn Indians with their 2–9 record that later caused them to withdraw from the ABL's second half of the season entirely (though they did later compete in the 1944 World Professional Basketball Tournament as the Brooklyn Eagles, where they surprisingly made it all the way to the championship round there before ultimately losing that match to the eventual champions of both the WPBT and the rivaling National Basketball League, the Fort Wayne Zollner Pistons). Looking to have a sense of redemption for their second half of the season, the Sphas would kick things into overdrive for that second half of the season and have a much better 8–4 record to close things out with a first place finish for that second half of the season. Despite finishing the overall season with a below-average 12–14 record (which would be the first time in their ABL history that the Sphas would end their season with a losing record, as well as their first season since technically their second and final season of play in the Philadelphia Basket Ball League, if not their first season in the Philadelphia League or even the 1920–21 American League of Philadelphia season where the Sphas would end a season of theirs with a losing record), due to the formatting of the two half seasons utilized within the ABL, the second half champion Sphas would compete against the first half champion Wilmington Bombers (who revived their operations under a shortened up name from their original Wilmington Blue Bombers name from their inaugural championship season, though with an entirely new roster at hand outside of veteran guard Moe Frankel, center Ed Sadowski and head coach Barney Sedran leading the team this time around despite the fact that the Trenton Tigers had a better overall record for both halves of this season (15–11) than the Sphas did. In any case, initially, it did appear as though the Sphas would pull off the championship series upset at first and get their seventh championship in eleven straight seasons of play in the revived ABL after getting a 3–1 series lead following a 31–44 Game 1 defeat at home. However, similar to what Philadelphia had done to the Jersey Reds in the 1937 championship series, the Wilmington Bombers would end up winning three straight games back themselves to deny the Sphas their seventh championship (and a secured dynasty) in the ABL this season, thus technically giving Wilmington back-to-back championship teams for the seasons their franchise actually played in the ABL during this point in time.

== Roster ==
Due to information on American Basketball League players being generally hard to find, there are bound to be more gaps and/or inaccuracies found in certain areas on the team's roster spots than usual.

1943–44 Philadelphia Sphas roster
Players

Pos.	No.	Player	Height	Weight	DOB	From
G/F		Moe Becker	6 ft 1 in (1.85 m)	185 lb (84 kg)	1917–02–24	Duquesne
F/C		Irv Davis	6 ft 2 in (1.88 m)	195 lb (88 kg)	1915–01–10	NYU
G		Jerry Fleishman	6 ft 2 in (1.88 m)	190 lb (86 kg)	1922–02–14	NYU
G/F		George Garber	6 ft 2 in (1.88 m)	180 lb (82 kg)	1918–02–26	George Washington
G		Jack Garfinkel	6 ft 0 in (1.83 m)	190 lb (86 kg)	1918–06–13	St. John's
G/F		Ed Hall	6 ft 2 in (1.88 m)	190 lb (86 kg)	Unknown	Unknown
C		Art Hillhouse	6 ft 7 in (2.01 m)	220 lb (100 kg)	1916–06–12	Long Island
C		Herm Knuppel	6 ft 8 in (2.03 m)	240 lb (109 kg)	1915–02–20	Panzer College
F/C		Inky Lautman	6 ft 2 in (1.88 m)	205 lb (93 kg)	1914–05–22	Central HS (PA)
G		Chink Morganstine	6 ft 0 in (1.83 m)	200 lb (91 kg)	1918–05–09	Temple
C		Paul Nowak	6 ft 5 in (1.96 m)	210 lb (95 kg)	1914–03–14	Notre Dame
G		Irv Reichman	5 ft 10 in (1.78 m)	170 lb (77 kg)	1922–01–27	La Salle
F/C		Red Rosan	6 ft 2 in (1.88 m)	195 lb (88 kg)	1911–05–22	Temple
G		Petey Rosenberg	5 ft 10 in (1.78 m)	165 lb (75 kg)	1918–04–07	Saint Joseph's
G/F		Ossie Schectman	6 ft 0 in (1.83 m)	175 lb (79 kg)	1919–03–30	Long Island
G/F		Butch Schwartz	6 ft 2 in (1.88 m)	190 lb (86 kg)	1919–02–14	Long Island
C		Dan Silver	6 ft 3 in (1.91 m)	180 lb (82 kg)	Unknown	Unknown
C		Nat Silverberg	6 ft 3 in (1.91 m)	180 lb (82 kg)	1922–09–06	Long Island
F		Irv Torgoff	6 ft 2 in (1.88 m)	192 lb (87 kg)	1917–03–06	Long Island
G/F		Leonard Weiner	6 ft 1 in (1.85 m)	180 lb (82 kg)	1923–10–26	Unknown
G		Red Wolfe	5 ft 11 in (1.80 m)	165 lb (75 kg)	1905–07–18	St. John's

Coaches
Head coach
- Eddie Gottlieb

Legend
- (DP) Unsigned draft pick
- (FA) Free agent
- (S) Suspended
- Injured

Note: The official team for the 1944 ABL Championship Series would involve Jerry Fleishman, Jack Garfinkel, Art Hillhouse, Herm Knuppel, Inky Lautman, Red Rosan, Ossie Schectman, Butch Schwartz, Irv Torgoff, and Red Wolfe (which would be close to half of the team's overall roster for this season, if not exactly half of the team's overall roster, depending on whether Dan Silver was actually Nat Silverberg or not).

== ABL Standings ==
First Half
Team	Wins	Losses	Winning %
Wilmington Bombers	12	4	.750
New York Americans	9	6	.600
Trenton Tigers	8	6	.571
Philadelphia SPHAs	4	10	.286
Brooklyn Indians^{[a]}	2	9	.182

Second Half
Team	Wins	Losses	Winning %
Philadelphia SPHAs	8	4	.667
Trenton Tigers	7	5	.583
Wilmington Bombers	5	5	.500
New York Americans	2	8	.200

== ABL Schedule ==
For the last time in the ABL's history, the Sphas would compete in a season where it was held with a first half and a second half before utilizing a championship series between the two best teams in each half that season (which involved the Wilmington Blue Bombers and the Sphas competing in a best of seven championship series this time around).

First Half
#	Date	Opponent	Score	Record
1A	November 12	@ New York Americans	43–44	0–1
2A	November 13	Trenton Tigers	35–40	0–2
3A	November 20	New York Americans	44–42	1–2
4A	November 21	@ Brooklyn Indians^{[a]}	46–35	2–2
5A	November 28	@ Wilmington Bombers	39–37	3–2
6A	December 4	Wilmington Bombers	43–48	3–3
7A	December 11	Brooklyn Indians^{[a]}	46–43	4–3
8A	December 12	@ Trenton Tigers	42–47	4–4
9A	December 15?	@ New York Americans	37–57	4–5
10A	December 18	Trenton Tigers	33–50	4–6
11A	December 19	@ Wilmington Bombers	44–50	4–7
12A	December 25	Wilmington Bombers	36–50	4–8
13A	January 2	@ Trenton Tigers	32–38 (OT)	4–9
14A	January 8	New York Americans	40–48	4–10

Second Half
#	Date	Opponent	Score	Record
1B	January 15	Trenton Tigers	42–46	0–1
2B	January 16	@ Wilmington Bombers	52–36	1–1
3B	January 21	@ New York Americans	37–38	1–2
4B	January 22	New York Americans	52–44	2–2
5B	January 29	Wilmington Bombers	63–42	3–2
6B	January 30	@ Trenton Tigers	33–44	3–3
7B	February 5	Trenton Tigers	54–46	4–3
8B	February 12	New York Americans	49–47	5–3
9B	February 19	Wilmington Bombers	39–36	6–3
10B	February 20	@ Trenton Tigers	52–51	7–3
11B	February 26	New York Americans	62–49	8–3
12B	February 27	@ Wilmington Bombers	30–38	8–4

Championship Series
Game	Date	Opponent	Score	Record
Game 1	March 4	Wilmington Bombers	31–44	0–1
Game 2	March 5	@ Wilmington Bombers	42–35	1–1
Game 3	March 12	@ Wilmington Bombers	50–44	2–1
Game 4	March 18	Wilmington Bombers	56–51	3–1
Game 5	March 19	@ Wilmington Bombers	38–45	3–2
Game 6	March 25	Wilmington Bombers	36–57	3–3
Game 7	March 26	@ Wilmington Bombers	33–57	4–3

== Notes ==
^{a} The Brooklyn Indians would drop out of the ABL by the end of the first half of the season, later rebranding themselves as the Brooklyn Eagles for independent play before the second half of the season officially began (notably playing under that name by the time the 1944 World Professional Basketball Tournament happened).
