= Clinic (disambiguation) =

A clinic is a public health facility.

Clinic may also refer to:

== Arts, entertainment, and media ==
=== Films ===
- The Clinic (1982 film), an Australian film
- The Clinic (2004 film), a TV film starring Jonathan Scarfe
- The Clinic (2010 film), an Australian film
- The Clinic (2023 film), a documentary film by Midi Z

=== Music ===
==== Groups and labels ====
- Clinic (band), an English indie rock band
  - Clinic (album), a compilation album by the band
- Clinic, a band featuring Canadian musician Philip Brigham

==== Other uses in music ====
- Clinic (music), an informal meeting with a guest musician, where a small-to-medium-sized audience questions the appearing musician's particular styles and techniques

=== Television ===
- The Clinic (1995 TV series), a 1995 spoof of medical dramas, produced by Brandon Tartikoff
- The Clinic (TV series), an Irish drama

=== Other arts, entertainment, and media ===
- The Clinic (game), a party game by Winning Moves UK
- The Clinic (newspaper), a Chilean newspaper

== Other uses ==
- Polyclinic and policlinic, types of health center
- Catholic Legal Immigration Network (CLINIC), a network of non-profit immigration program

== See also ==
- Klinik, a Belgian industrial band
