= 1936–37 Philadelphia Sphas season =

American basketball team season

1936–37 Philadelphia Sphas / Hebrews season
- League champions
- League: American Basketball League (revived original)
- Head coach: Eddie Gottlieb
- General manager: Eddie Gottlieb
- Owner(s): Eddie Gottlieb
- Arena: Broadwood Hotel

Results
- Record: 26–12 (.684)
- Place: Conference: 2nd (1st half), 1st (2nd half)
- Playoff finish: ABL Champions (Won 4–3 over Jersey Reds)

The Philadelphia Sphas were an early, historical example of an American professional basketball team. The 1936–37 season was the fourth season played in the now-revived American Basketball League by the Sphas, although they did play in the original rendition of the ABL from 1926 to 1928 as the Philadelphia Warriors, which had no relation to the later BAA franchise of the same name that now exists in the present day as the Golden State Warriors in the NBA. As such, when including the past history of the original ABL with the revived version of the ABL in 1933 following historical problems that related to the Great Depression near the end of 1931, this would technically be the tenth official season played by the original ABL properly, though this would officially be the 20th season of play for the Sphas franchise when including previous seasons where they played under names like the "Philadelphia YMHA"; the "Philadelphia Passon, Gottlieb, Black", the "Philadelphia Warriors"; and most recently, the "Philadelphia Hebrews".

== Background ==
The Sphas played in leagues around Philadelphia since 1917, but game-by-game records before the Sphas rejoined the ABL in 1933 are not (currently) available (at least, not to the general public if official game records did exist for the Sphas) and are therefore likely lost to time itself.

When trying to repeat as champions in the ABL properly following their victory from the previous season (as well as become ABL champions for the third time in four seasons), the Sphas would end up finishing the first half of the season (which weirdly happened during a doubleheader session they had during that day alongside the start to the second half of the season this time around) with a second place finish with an above-average 12–6 record, which was only surpassed by the Jersey Reds this time around with an even more impressive 14–4 first half record. With a chance at repeating as champions being on the line, the Sphas would lock in for the (mostly realigned) second half of the season and hold a first place finish for the second half of the season with an even better 14–6 record to close out that half of the season, being two games ahead of the Reds this time around. As a result of these finishes for this season, the ABL's championship series for this season would see the Jersey Reds and the Philadelphia Sphas compete for the league's championship this time around after the Sphas previously went up against the now-defunct Trenton Moose and the Brooklyn Visitations in their first two championship match-ups. Unlike the Sphas' first two championship runs in the ABL, they would lose their first game and face a serious 3–1 deficit following two straight matches where the Reds scored 34 points against them. However, after winning a close Game 5 and getting a blowout Game 6 victory, the Sphas would get another close victory in Game 7 to upset the Reds to repeat as champions with a 4–3 series win. With that being said, the Sphas were also referred to as the Philadelphia Hebrews in league records during this period of time, with the Hebrews name continuing to be utilized until the end of this season in 1937 due to the concerning rise of antisemitism within the U.S.A. before World War II was set to begin.

== Roster ==
Due to information on American Basketball League players being generally hard to find, there are bound to be more gaps and/or inaccuracies found in certain areas on the team's roster spots than usual.

1936–37 Philadelphia Sphas / Hebrews roster
Players

Pos.	No.	Player	Height	Weight	DOB	From
G/F		Gil Fitch	6 ft 0 in (1.83 m)	175 lb (79 kg)	1909–12–24	Temple
G/F		Lou Fox	6 ft 2 in (1.88 m)	190 lb (86 kg)	1911–09–02	Temple
F/C		Moe Goldman	6 ft 3 in (1.91 m)	175 lb (79 kg)	1913–05–30	CCNY
G/F		Shikey Gotthoffer	6 ft 0 in (1.83 m)	195 lb (88 kg)	1911–01–01	NYU
G		Cy Kaselman	5 ft 10 in (1.78 m)	165 lb (75 kg)	1909–05–01	Temple
F/C		Inky Lautman	6 ft 2 in (1.88 m)	205 lb (93 kg)	1914–05–22	Central HS (PA)
F/C		Red Rosan	6 ft 2 in (1.88 m)	195 lb (88 kg)	1911–05–22	Temple
G		Red Wolfe	5 ft 11 in (1.80 m)	165 lb (75 kg)	1905–07–18	St. John's

Coaches
Head coach
- Eddie Gottlieb

Legend
- (DP) Unsigned draft pick
- (FA) Free agent
- (S) Suspended
- Injured

Note: Lou "Jim" Fox would not play for the team during the 1937 ABL Championship series.

== ABL Standings ==
First Half
Team	Wins	Losses	Winning %
Jersey Reds	14	4	.778
Philadelphia SPHAs / Hebrews	12	6	.667
Kingston Colonials	11	6	.647
New York Jewels^{[a]}	7	10	.412
Paterson Visitations / Brooklyn Visitations^{[b]}	4	12	.250
Atlantic City Sandpipers / Sand Snipers^{[c]}	0	10	.000

Second Half
Team	Wins	Losses	Winning %
Philadelphia SPHAs / Hebrews	14	6	.700
Jersey Reds	12	8	.600
Brooklyn Visitations^{[b]}	10	9	.526
New York (Original) Celtics^{[d]}	10	10	.500
Kingston Colonials	9	11	.450
Brooklyn Jewels^{[a]}	4	15	.211

== ABL Schedule ==
First Half
#	Date	Opponent	Score	Record
1A	November 4	@ Kingston Colonials	30–27	1–0
2A	November 7	Kingston Colonials	40–27	2–0
3A	November 8	@ New York Jewels^{[a]}	21–30	2–1
4A	November 14	New York Jewels^{[a]}	27–21	3–1
5A	November 20	@ Paterson Visitations^{[b]}	39–31	4–1
6A	November 21	Atlantic City Sandpipers / Sand Snipers^{[c]}	45–38	5–1
7A	November 28	Brooklyn Visitations^{[b]}	37–27	6–1
8A	November 29	@ Jersey Reds	36–38	6–2
9A	December 5	Jersey Reds	42–30	7–2
10A	December 6	@ New York Jewels^{[a]}^{[e]}	25–34	7–3
11A	December 8	@ Atlantic City Sandpipers / Sand Snipers^{[c]}	34–25	8–3
12A	December 12	Kingston Colonials	43–49	8–4
13A	December 19	New York Jewels^{[a]}	52–38	9–4
14A	December 25	@ Kingston Colonials	30–47	9–5
15A	December 26	Brooklyn Visitations^{[b]}	40–34	10–5
16A	December 27	@ Brooklyn Visitations^{[b]}	37–29	11–5
17A	January 9	Jersey Reds	49–41	12–5
18A	January 10	@ Jersey Reds	33–56	12–6

Second Half
#	Date	Opponent	Score	Record
1B	January 10	@ New York / Brooklyn Jewels^{[a]}	37–36	1–0
2B	January 13	@ Kingston Colonials	38–46	1–1
3B	January 16	Brooklyn Jewels^{[a]}	50–32	2–1
4B	January 17	@ New York (Original) Celtics^{[d]}	28–35	2–2
5B	January 23	Brooklyn Visitations^{[b]}	31–27	3–2
6B	February 6	New York (Original) Celtics^{[d]}	44–38	4–2
7B	February 7	@ Brooklyn Visitations^{[b]}	31–25	5–2
8B	February 13	Kingston Colonials	48–34	6–2
9B	February 14	@ Jersey Reds	35–43	6–3
10B	February 17	@ Kingston Colonials	35–26	7–3
11B	February 20	Brooklyn Jewels^{[a]}	33–23	8–3
12B	February 22	@ Brooklyn Jewels^{[a]}	30–24	9–3
13B	February 27	Jersey Reds	42–38	10–3
14B	February 28	@ Brooklyn Visitations^{[b]}	38–59	10–4
15B	March 6	Brooklyn Visitations^{[b]}	32–40	10–5
16B	March 7	@ Jersey Reds	33–38	10–6
17B	March 13	Jersey Reds	51–34	11–6
18B	March 14	@ New York (Original) Celtics^{[d]}	31–22	12–6
19B	March 15	Kingston Colonials	55–29	13–6
20B	March 20	New York (Original) Celtics^{[d]}	46–33	14–6

ABL Championship Series
Game	Date	Opponent	Score	Record
Game 1	March 27	Jersey Reds	31–36	0–1
Game 2	March 28	@ Jersey Reds	39–36	1–1
Game 3	April 3	Jersey Reds	28–34	1–2
Game 4	April 4	@ Jersey Reds	30–34	1–3
Game 5	April 10	Jersey Reds	34–33	2–3
Game 6	April 14	@ Jersey Reds	45–23	3–3
Game 7	April 17	Jersey Reds	44–43 (OT)	4–3

== Notes ==
^{a} Originally, the New York Jewels played as the New York Jewels for the first half of the season. However, by the start of the second half of the season, the team would rebrand themselves to the Brooklyn Jewels (likely because of the inclusion of the New York (Original) Celtics for the second half of the season following the departure of the Atlantic City Sandpipers / Sand Snipers near the end of the first half of the season) for the rest of that season only going forward.
^{b} The Brooklyn Visitations originally moved from Brooklyn, New York to Paterson, New Jersey to become the Paterson Visitations early on before the first half of the season began. However, by November 23, 1936, the Visitations would decide to move back from Paterson, New Jersey to Brooklyn, New York to become the Brooklyn Visitations once again for the rest of the season going forward.
^{c} After losing all ten of their regular season games in the first half of the season, the Atlantic City Sandpipers / Sand Snipers would drop out of the ABL entirely by December 21, 1936.
^{d} For the second half of the season, the New York (Original) Celtics would return to the ABL by entering the league for that specific half of the season by January 3, 1937 and playing in the ABL for the rest of the season going forward.
^{e} Game was played somewhere in New Jersey instead of in New York.
