= 1938–39 New York Jewels season =

- League champions
- League: American Basketball League (revived original)
- Head coach: Eddie Wilde
- General manager: Eddie Wilde
- Owner(s): Eddie Wilde
- Arena: Arcadia Hall

Results
- Record: 19–15 (.559)
- Place: Conference: 4th
- Playoff finish: ABL Champions (Won 3–0 over Jersey Reds)

The 1938–39 New York Jewels season was the eighth professional basketball season played by the New York Jewels franchise, which was their fifth season played while representing the state of New York as a whole instead of a specific city there like the city of Brooklyn or New Haven, Connecticut. Entering this season, the ABL would see eight teams competing in the league this season with two new teams in the Washington Heurichs works team and the Wilkes-Barre Barons (the latter of which had history dating as far back as 1914) being added to the league while the New York Celtics were technically replaced by the Troy Haymakers in the process. Not only that, but this would also be the ABL's first season where their league would operate under a proper regular season format similar to what the rivaling National Basketball League was doing (though the ABL's playoffs would be different from the NBL's since the ABL Playoffs would involve the four best teams in the league competing in the playoffs in a best-of-three semifinal round before the two remaining teams would compete in a best-of-five championship series). Unfortunately for the Jewels, they would look like they'd see a bit of a decline in performance with their overall season providing them an above-average 19–15 record, which got them a fourth place finish this time around behind that of the defending champion Jersey Reds (albeit barely on their case), the Philadelphia SPHAs, and the Kingston Colonials. Fortunately for them, however, due to the split season formatting being gone for this season, the Jewels would end up being the last team to qualify for the ABL Playoffs due to them being the last winning team in the ABL above that of the aforementioned Wilkes-Barre Barons, with the Jewels going up against the long-standing second-seeded Philadelphia SPHAs in the semifinal round. Surprisingly for the New York Jewels, in spite of their fourth place finish in the ABL, not only would the Jewels end up sweeping the SPHAs in the semifinal round, but they'd also get their revenge against the #3 seeded Jersey Reds by sweeping the defending champions to finally get their first ABL championship to go alongside the Metropolitan Basketball League championship that they got back when they were originally the Brooklyn Jewels back in the 1932–33 season.

== Roster ==
Due to information on American Basketball League players being generally hard to find, there are bound to be more gaps and/or inaccuracies found in certain areas on the team's roster spots than usual.

1938–39 New York Jewels roster
Players

Pos.	No.	Player	Height	Weight	DOB	From
F/C		Matty Begovich	6 ft 5 in (1.96 m)	205 lb (93 kg)	1910-10-02	St. John's
F		Rip Gerson	5 ft 10 in (1.78 m)	165 lb (75 kg)	1906-04-06	St. John's
G		George Goldsmith	5 ft 9 in (1.75 m)	155 lb (70 kg)	1914-04-21	CCNY
G		Ed Grote	6 ft 2 in (1.88 m)	220 lb (100 kg)	1915-10-06	No college
G		Rip Kaplinsky	5 ft 6 in (1.68 m)	155 lb (70 kg)	1912-11-13	St. John's
G/F		Mac Kinsbrunner	5 ft 9 in (1.75 m)	155 lb (70 kg)	1909-03-21	St. John's
G		Mickey Kupperberg	5 ft 11 in (1.80 m)	185 lb (84 kg)	1914-03-17	Minnesota
C		John Mardy	6 ft 4 in (1.93 m)	200 lb (91 kg)	1915-07-11	Pratt Institute
F/C		Jake Pelkington	6 ft 6 in (1.98 m)	220 lb (100 kg)	1916-01-03	Manhattan
G/F		Willie Rubenstein	5 ft 11 in (1.80 m)	175 lb (79 kg)	1912-04-03	NYU
G/F		Honey Russell	5 ft 11 in (1.80 m)	175 lb (79 kg)	1911-09-10	St. John's
G		Bernie Schiffer	6 ft 0 in (1.83 m)	175 lb (79 kg)	1915-07-29	CCNY
G/F		Allie Schuckman	5 ft 8 in (1.73 m)	155 lb (70 kg)	1907-11-25	St. John's
G/F		George Slott	5 ft 11 in (1.80 m)	185 lb (84 kg)	1912-06-09	St. John's
G/F		Lou Spindell	5 ft 10 in (1.78 m)	175 lb (79 kg)	1908-12-16	CCNY
F		Rocky Valvano	6 ft 0 in (1.83 m)	160 lb (73 kg)	1914-05-29	Savage School for Physical Education
G		Nat Volpe	5 ft 8 in (1.73 m)	155 lb (70 kg)	1916-05-15	Manhattan
C		Jim Whatley	6 ft 6 in (1.98 m)	220 lb (100 kg)	1913-03-11	Alabama
G		Tony Zaycek	5 ft 10 in (1.78 m)	155 lb (70 kg)	1916-07-06	Seton Hall

Coaches
Head coach

Eddie Wilde

Legend
- (DP) Unsigned draft pick
- (FA) Free agent
- (S) Suspended
- Injured

Note: The roster for the team's playoff roster for this season would specifically include Rip Gerson, Mac Kinsbrunner, Mickey Kupperberg, Jake Pelkington, Willie Rubenstein, Lou Spindell, and George Slott. In addition to that, there was also an unknown guard with the last name of Dailey (who might have played for a Collegiates team in a doubleheader match) that briefly played for the Jewels in the regular season as well.

== American Basketball League Standings ==
Pos.	League Standings	Wins	Losses	Win %
1	Kingston Colonials	28	7	.800
2	Philadelphia SPHAs	24	9	.727
3	Jersey Reds	19	14	.576
4	New York Jewels	19	15	.559
5	Wilkes-Barre Barons	14	22	.389
6	Troy Haymakers	12	21	.364
7	Brooklyn Visitations	7	20	.259
8	Washington Heurichs	7	22	.241

The top four teams would later compete in a playoff format this season, with the best team competing against the third-best team and the second-best team competing against the fourth-best team through a best-of-three series in the semifinal round before the winning two teams from each round would go up against each other in a best-of-three championship series.

== American Basketball League Playoffs ==
For the first time since the 1927–28 season (or ever in terms of its revived history), the American Basketball League would host a proper playoff series for their league by the end of the regular season instead of a championship series between the two best teams on each half-season of play (with potential tiebreaker series of match-ups going down after each half-season is over and done with).

=== American Basketball League Semifinals ===
Game	Date	Opponent	Score	Record
Game 1	March 18	@ Philadelphia SPHAs	46–44	1–0
Game 2	March 19	Philadelphia SPHAs	31–24	2–0

=== American Basketball League Championship Round ===
Game	Date	Opponent	Score	Record
Game 1	March 31	@ Jersey Reds	34–30	1–0
Game 2	April 2	Jersey Reds^{[a]}	40–36	2–0
Game 3	April 9	Jersey Reds^{[a]}	37–34 (OT)	3–0

== Note ==
^{a} Games were played in Brooklyn.
