= 1939–40 New York Jewels season =

- League: American Basketball League (revived original)
- Head coach: Eddie Wilde
- General manager: Eddie Wilde
- Owner(s): Eddie Wilde
- Arena: Arcadia Hall; 71st Regiment Armory

Results
- Record: 15–15 (.500)
- Place: Conference: 4th
- Playoff finish: Finished the ABL's Round-Robin Tournament in third place behind the Troy Celtics and Philadelphia Sphas.

The 1939–40 New York Jewels season was the ninth professional basketball season played by the New York Jewels franchise, which was their sixth season played while representing the state of New York as a whole instead of a specific city there like the city of Brooklyn or New Haven, Connecticut. Entering this season, the Jewels sought to repeat as champions in the ABL, which saw eight teams competing in a proper regular season format once again, though it wouldn't be the same eight teams due to the Washington Heurichs renaming themselves to become the Washington Heurich Brewers and the long-established Brooklyn Visitations being replaced by the Baltimore Clippers. However, by the end of the season, only five teams would remain in the league due to two mergers occurring in the league, with one team deciding to withdraw their operations from the ABL this season following said mergers in question. In this case, the defending champion New York Jewels would ironically end up merging their operations with the previous season's runners-up, the rivaling Jersey Reds, due to Jersey having financial issues on their ends, though unlike the previous year's Troy Haymakers merger with the long-standing (and better on paper) Kingston Colonials where the two teams ended up becoming the Troy Celtics for the rest of the season soon afterward, the New York Jewels would retain everything on their own accord while also acquiring some of the best Jersey Reds players upon the merger at hand. This merger would ultimately lead to an end to their second rivalry in a season after the Brooklyn Visitations either left the ABL entirely or moved to Baltimore to become the Clippers there.

With that said, the Jewels would not see much improvement on their ends despite acquiring the best Jersey Reds players on their team from the merger at hand. By the end of the season, the New York Jewels would end up finishing the season with their second straight fourth place finish, this time with an average 15–15 that would only barely be better than the Baltimore Clippers in terms of teams that actually completed their seasons in the ABL. If the ABL had kept on using the same playoff format that they used from the previous season where the Jewels first won that season's championship, New York would only barely qualify due to them not having a below-average record like the Clippers held, though they'd be behind the Troy Celtics and the tied first place teams of the Philadelphia SPHAs and the Washington Heurich Brewers. However, due to the combination of the number of teams leaving the ABL this season (either through mergers or by their own volition) and the first place tiebreaker between Philadelphia and Washington, the New York Jewels would end up being one of five teams alongside the Celtics, the Clippers, the SPHAs, and the Heurich Brewers to compete in what would become the ABL Round-Robin Tournament, where the plan in mind would see every surviving team competing against each other once at home and once on the road to have eight games each, with a tiebreaker being in mind for first place later on, if necessary. Despite their merger with the Jersey Reds, however, the Jewels would end up remaining one of the weaker teams of the ABL's Round-Robin Tournament, as New York would end up having mixed performances throughout the entire event. In spite of those mixed results, however, the Jewels would end up getting a third place finish through a weirdly incomplete looking 3–4 record, which put them ahead of the Clippers and the Heurich Brewers (surprisingly enough on their ends, especially considering their third place finish in the 1940 World Professional Basketball Tournament), but behind the Troy Celtics and the eventual champion Philadelphia SPHAs.

== Roster ==
Due to information on American Basketball League players being generally hard to find, there are bound to be more gaps and/or inaccuracies found in certain areas on the team's roster spots than usual.

1939–40 New York Jewels roster
Players

Pos.	No.	Player	Height	Weight	DOB	From
G		Hook Anderson	5 ft 11 in (1.80 m)	175 lb (79 kg)	1912-04-08	NYU
F		Milt Beck	6 ft 1 in (1.85 m)	190 lb (86 kg)	1913-07-10	No college
C		Al Benson	6 ft 5 in (1.96 m)	220 lb (100 kg)	1914-07-27	Seton Hall
F		Rip Gerson	5 ft 10 in (1.78 m)	165 lb (75 kg)	1906-04-06	St. John's
G/F		Ace Goldstein	6 ft 1 in (1.85 m)	190 lb (86 kg)	1917-03-20	CCNY
G/F		Mac Kinsbrunner	5 ft 9 in (1.75 m)	155 lb (70 kg)	1909-03-21	St. John's
G		Tony Krygier	5 ft 11 in (1.80 m)	170 lb (77 kg)	1915-09-25	Newtown HS (NY)
F		Lou Lefkowitz	5 ft 11 in (1.80 m)	175 lb (79 kg)	1917-10-19	CCNY
F		Red Paris	5 ft 8 in (1.73 m)	150 lb (68 kg)	1918-01-08	CCNY
F/C		Jake Pelkington	6 ft 6 in (1.98 m)	220 lb (100 kg)	1916-01-03	Manhattan
G/F		Willie Rubenstein	5 ft 11 in (1.80 m)	175 lb (79 kg)	1912-04-03	NYU
G		Milt Schulman	5 ft 10 in (1.78 m)	160 lb (73 kg)	1914-05-30	NYU
G/F		George Slott	5 ft 11 in (1.80 m)	185 lb (84 kg)	1912-06-09	St. John's
F		Moe Spahn	6 ft 1 in (1.85 m)	180 lb (82 kg)	1912-05-03	CCNY
G/F		Lou Spindell	5 ft 10 in (1.78 m)	175 lb (79 kg)	1908-12-16	CCNY
F		Rocky Valvano	6 ft 0 in (1.83 m)	160 lb (73 kg)	1914-05-29	Savage School for Physical Education

Coaches
Head coach

Eddie Wilde

Legend
- (DP) Unsigned draft pick
- (FA) Free agent
- (S) Suspended
- Injured

Note: The roster for the team's participating in the ABL Round-Robin Tournament would see none of Milt Beck, Rip Gerson, Tony Krygler, Lou Lefkowtiz, Milt Schulman, Lou Spindell, and Rocky Valvano appear with the team while the Jewels participated in that unique tournament of theirs.

== American Basketball League Standings ==
Pos.	League Standings	Wins	Losses	Win %
T–1	Philadelphia SPHAs^{[a]}	19	13	.594
T–1	Washington Heurich Brewers^{[a]}	19	13	.594
3	Troy Celtics^{[b]}	19	15	.559
4	New York Jewels^{[c]}	15	15	.500
5	Baltimore Clippers	15	16	.484
6*	Kingston Colonials^{[b]}	8	4	.667
7*	Jersey Reds^{[c]}	7	14	.333
8*	Troy Haymakers^{[b]}	3	9	.250
9*	Wilkes-Barre Barons^{[d]}	5	17	.227

* – Unofficial placement for the team this season.

== ABL Round-Robin Tournament Standings ==
Pos.	League Standings	Wins	Losses	Win %
1	Philadelphia SPHAs	8	0	1.000
2	Troy Celtics^{[b]}	6	2	.750
3	New York Jewels^{[c]}	3	4	.429
4	Washington Heurich Brewers	1	6	.143
5	Baltimore Clippers	1	7	.125

One game between the New York Jewels and the Washington Heurich Brewers ultimately became cancelled near the end of the Round Robin Tournament.

== ABL Round-Robin Tournament ==
Due to the unique circumstances involved with this season of play (namely seeing the eight-team league go down to only five competitive teams by the end of the season due to multiple team mergers and a folding occur in the case of the (original) Wilkes-Barre Barons franchise), the ABL would implement their first and only round-robin tournament setting instead of a more typical playoff format like what was done in some past ABL seasons or like within the rivaling National Basketball League or even only utilizing a championship round with the two best teams of the league (in this case, the Philadelphia Sphas and the Washington Heurich Brewers) similar to most other ABL seasons by comparison. With this round-robin tournament, the remaining five teams from this season (the Philadelphia Sphas, Washington Heurich Brewers, Troy Celtics, New York Jewels, and Baltimore Clippers) would compete in a unique tournament where each of the five remaining ABL teams would compete against each other twice (once at home and once on the road, though it wouldn't always be the case during this tournament) in order to help determine the champion of the ABL (with a potential tiebreaker series later being in mind if it was deemed necessary in the end). Unfortunately for the since-merged New York Jewels, they would end up having mixed performances throughout the entire event before eventually finishing it with a barely below-average 3–4 record for a third place finish in this championship tournament that the ABL held for this season.

ABL Round-Robin Tournament
Game	Date	Opponent	Score	Record
Game 1	March 3	Baltimore Clippers	34–21	1–0
Game 2	March 6	@ Troy Celtics^{[b]}	26–27	1–1
Game 3	March 15	@ Baltimore Clippers	34–33	2–1
Game 4	March 17	Philadelphia Sphas	27–33	2–2
Game 5	March 24	Washington Heurich Brewers	36–30	3–2
Game 6	March 30	@ Philadelphia Sphas	35–37	3–3
Game 7	March 31	Troy Celtics^{[b]}	31–38	3–4
—	April	@ Washington Heurich Brewers	Cancelled	

The New York Jewels would end the ABL's Round-Robin Tournament with a below-average 3–4 record (with one game where they were meant to compete against the Washington Heurich Brewers as the road team ended up getting cancelled for some reason), finishing it in third place by being ahead of both the aforementioned Washington Heurich Brewers (who were close to tying for last place themselves) and the Baltimore Clippers, but behind only the Troy Celtics (who were created when the Troy Haymakers merged operations with the Kingston Colonials to become the Troy Celtics for the rest of the season) and the eventual champion Philadelphia Sphas.

== Notes ==
^{a} The Philadelphia Sphas would defeat the Washington Heurich Brewers on March 9, 1940, with a 34–27 final score to secure first place officially with what could be considered a 20–13 record (.606 win percentage) on the Sphas' end and a 19–14 record (.576 win percentage) on the Heurich Brewers' end instead of an officially recorded 19–13 record (.594 win percentage) for both teams.
^{b} Despite being tied with the Sphas for what could be considered as the best team in the ABL at that point in time during this season with an 8–4 record, the Kingston Colonials would end up merging operations with the Troy Haymakers to become the Troy Celtics (which could really be considered the spiritual successors of the Original Celtics franchise under a different location and name) on December 19, 1939, with the merged franchises foolishly continuing under the Troy Haymakers' 3–9 record instead of the Kingston Colonials' 8–4 record (likely because of the decision to have the merged franchise continue playing in Troy, New York instead of continuing to play and operate nearby Kingston, New York).
^{c} Both the previous ABL champion Jersey Reds and the defending ABL champion New York Jewels would merge operations on January 26, 1940, to remain as the New York Jewels for the rest of the season, with the Jewels franchise continuing on with the same win-loss record that they had before the merger occurred (with that record remaining intact as if nothing had happened with them due to them being the surviving team within the merger while the Jersey Reds effectively folded operations with a 7–14 record this season) while also making sure the Jewels franchise survived operations for at least another season.
^{d} The (original) Wilkes-Barre Barons ABL franchise dropped out of the league before officially finishing their season with the ABL on February 2, 1940, with the Barons leaving the league with the worst record of the entire league that season at 5–17.
