= 1937–38 New Haven / New York Jewels season =

- League: American Basketball League (revived original)
- Head coach: Eddie Wilde
- General manager: Eddie Wilde
- Owner(s): Eddie Wilde
- Arena: Allentown Armory? (New Haven); Arcadia Hall (New York)

Results
- Record: 26–13 (.667)
- Place: Conference: 2nd (1st half for New Haven/New York); 1st (2nd half for New York)
- Playoff finish: New York Jewels lost ABL championship 4–2 to the Jersey Reds.

The 1937–38 New Haven / New York Jewels season was the seventh professional basketball season played by the New York Jewels franchise, which was officially their fourth season played while representing the state of New York as a whole instead of a specific city there like the city of Brooklyn, though it was also their only season playing as the New Haven Jewels while competing in the city of New Haven, Connecticut (even though their home venue during that time would apparently be held in Allentown, Pennsylvania for some odd reason). Before the season began, the Jewels moved from Brooklyn, New York to New Haven, Connecticut to start out the season as the New Haven Jewels. However, by the end of November on November 30, 1937, the team would move back to the state of New York to become the New York Jewels once again for the rest of their existence (pretty much) going forward. As such, with their move back from New Haven to Brooklyn to represent the state of New York as a whole once again for essentially the rest of their existence going forward, the Jewels would end up getting back to the early successes they had in their history for this season, with the New Haven turned New York Jewels having an above-average 12–8 record to get them a second place finish for the first half of the season behind only the Jersey Reds. Meanwhile, in the second half of the season, the New York Jewels would end up performing even better for that half of the season, with their 14–5 record for that half resulting in them getting a first place finish this time around. As a result of that placement, the New York Jewels would qualify for the ABL's championship series for this season against the rivaling Jersey Reds for a shot at winning their first ever ABL championship. Unfortunately for the Jewels, following a 1–1 series tie, the Reds would end up winning three out of their next four games played afterward to have the Jersey Reds get a 4–2 series championship for their first ever championship, while the New York Jewels would be denied an ABL championship to their name for the fifth time in their overall history with that particular league.

== Roster ==
Due to information on American Basketball League players being generally hard to find, there are bound to be more gaps and/or inaccuracies found in certain areas on the team's roster spots than usual.

1937–38 New Haven / New York Jewels roster
Players

Pos.	No.	Player	Height	Weight	DOB	From
F/C		Matty Begovich	6 ft 5 in (1.96 m)	205 lb (93 kg)	1910-10-02	St. John's
C		Stan Entrup	6 ft 4 in (1.93 m)	205 lb (93 kg)	1907-03-16	No college
F		Rip Gerson	5 ft 10 in (1.78 m)	165 lb (75 kg)	1906-04-06	St. John's
G		Johnny Kane			1913	Fordham
G/F		Mac Kinsbrunner	5 ft 9 in (1.75 m)	155 lb (70 kg)	1909-03-21	St. John's
G		Mickey Kupperberg	5 ft 11 in (1.80 m)	185 lb (84 kg)	1914-03-17	Minnesota
F		Ken Norton	6 ft 2 in (1.88 m)	200 lb (91 kg)	1914-05-07	Long Island
F/C		Jake Pelkington	6 ft 6 in (1.98 m)	220 lb (100 kg)	1916-01-03	Manhattan
G/F		Willie Rubenstein	5 ft 11 in (1.80 m)	175 lb (79 kg)	1912-04-03	NYU
G/F		Honey Russell	5 ft 11 in (1.80 m)	175 lb (79 kg)	1911-09-10	St. John's
F		Rusty Saunders	6 ft 2 in (1.88 m)	212 lb (96 kg)	1906-03-12	No college
G/F		Allie Schuckman	5 ft 8 in (1.73 m)	155 lb (70 kg)	1907-11-25	St. John's
G/F		George Slott	5 ft 11 in (1.80 m)	185 lb (84 kg)	1912-06-09	St. John's
G/F		Lou Spindell	5 ft 10 in (1.78 m)	175 lb (79 kg)	1908-12-16	CCNY

Coaches
Head coach

Eddie Wilde

Legend
- (DP) Unsigned draft pick
- (FA) Free agent
- (S) Suspended
- Injured

Note: The New York Jewels would not have any of Stan Entrup, Rip Gerson, Johnny Kane, Ken Norton, or Rusty Saunders be a part of their championship series roster for this season.

== American Basketball League Standings ==
First Half
Team	Wins	Losses	Winning %
Jersey Reds	16	6	.727
New Haven Jewels / New York Jewels^{[a]}	12	8	.600
Brooklyn Visitations	13	10	.565
Philadelphia SPHAs	12	10	.545
New York (Original) Celtics	11	10	.524
Kingston Colonials	5	15	.250
New York Yankees^{[b]}	1	11	.083

Second Half
Team	Wins	Losses	Winning %
New York Jewels^{[a]}	14	5	.737
Jersey Reds	13	7	.650
Philadelphia SPHAs	11	9	.550
Kingston Colonials	9	9	.500
New York (Original) Celtics	7	11	.389
Brooklyn Visitations	2	15	.118

== American Basketball League Championship Series ==
Earlier in the season, the New York Jewels competed in the season as the New Haven Jewels. However, due to the Jewels winning the second half of the season while representing the state of New York instead of while competing in New Haven, Connecticut, they will be referred to properly as the New York Jewels only here.

Jersey Reds (1st Half Champions) Vs. New York Jewels (2nd Half Champions): Jersey Reds win series 4–2

ABL Championship Series
Game	Date	Opponent	Score	Record
Game 1	April 2	@ Jersey Reds	34–35	0–1
Game 2	April 3	Jersey Reds^{[c]}	33–30	1–1
Game 3	April 9	@ Jersey Reds	22–30	1–2
Game 4	April 10	Jersey Reds^{[c]}	24–26	1–3
Game 5	April 13	@ Jersey Reds	37–33	2–3
Game 6	April 17	Jersey Reds^{[c]}	28–30	2–4

== Notes ==
^{a} Before the season began, the Brooklyn Jewels moved from Brooklyn, New York to New Haven, Connecticut to become the New Haven Jewels to start out the season. However, on November 30, 1937, the team moved back from New Haven to Brooklyn to once again return to their original New York Jewels name for the rest of the season.
^{b} The New York Yankees basketball team would drop out of the ABL on January 11, 1938, during the first half of the season.
^{c} Games were played in Brooklyn.
