= Visitations =

Visitations may refer to:

- Heraldic visitation
- Brooklyn Visitations, an American basketball team based in Brooklyn, New York City
- Paterson Visitations, an American basketball team based in Paterson, New Jersey
- Visitations (Clinic album), 2006
- Visitations (The Juan MacLean album)
- The Visitations, Dave Wrathgeber of Fablefactory's solo project
