= 1942–43 New York Jewels season =

- League: American Basketball League (revived original)
- Head coach: Eddie Wilde
- General manager: Eddie Wilde
- Owner(s): Eddie Wilde
- Arena: Manhattan Center

Results
- Record: 1–7 (.125)
- Place: Conference: 5th
- Playoff finish: Did not qualify

The 1942–43 New York Jewels season was the twelfth and final professional basketball season played by the New York Jewels franchise, which was their ninth and final season played while representing the state of New York as a whole instead of a specific city there like the city of Brooklyn or New Haven, Connecticut. After previously exiting the ABL in January 1942 around the conclusion of the first half of that season, the Jewels would end up returning to that league once again (with Eddie Wilde being the head coach of the team once again), being one of five teams to compete in the ABL this season (with the ABL actually having more teams competing in their league this season than the rivaling National Basketball League had utilized for once in their interleague rivalry). However, before this season began, while both the ABL and NBL contemplated shutting down operations this season before being encouraged to continue operations during the World War II period in order to boost up morale within the nation, they both needed to deal with travel restrictions banning "pleasure driving" for civilians in order to have the nation save up on gasoline consumption. Not only that, but both the ABL and NBL would enter into an agreement with each other alongside the minor Connecticut State Basketball League where it was prohibited to transfer players between their leagues without due compensation in order to minimize the effects of many of the game's players joining the war effort during this period in time. That combination of factors would lead to the Jewels being tied with the newly-added Camden turned Brooklyn Indians franchise for the least amount of games played this season with eight total games played on their ends (with none of their players playing all eight games with the Jewels this season), though the New York Jewels would perform so poorly once again that they would lose every single game played outside of their February 20, 1943 37–32 road victory over the Philadelphia SPHAs for a last place finish to the season with a 1–7 record. Unlike the previous season where the Jewels dropped out of the league (if only on a temporary basis), however, the New York Jewels would not only not return to the ABL following this season's conclusion, but they would never return to being a professional basketball franchise after this point in time as well.

== Roster ==
Due to information on American Basketball League players being generally hard to find, there are bound to be more gaps and/or inaccuracies found in certain areas on the team's roster spots than usual.

1942–43 New York Jewels roster
Players

| Pos. | No. | Player | Height | Weight | DOB | From |
|---|---|---|---|---|---|---|
| G | | Hook Anderson | 5 ft 11 in (1.80 m) | 175 lb (79 kg) | 1912-04-08 | NYU |
| F | | Cy Boardman | 6 ft 2 in (1.88 m) | 185 lb (84 kg) | 1915-08-24 | NYU |
| C | | Howie Bollerman | 6 ft 8 in (2.03 m) | 200 lb (91 kg) | 1907-06-09 | Colgate |
| G/F | | Jim Buckley | 5 ft 11 in (1.80 m) | 165 lb (75 kg) | 1920? | Erasmus Hall HS (NY) |
| G/F | | Bill Goebel | 5 ft 10 in (1.78 m) | 150 lb (68 kg) | 1921-09-16 | Bushwick HS (NY) |
| G/F | | Pat Goldstein | 6 ft 2 in (1.88 m) | 195 lb (88 kg) | 1912-11-15 | Brooklyn |
| G/F | | Sonny Hertzberg | 5 ft 10 in (1.78 m) | 175 lb (79 kg) | 1922-07-29 | CCNY |
| G | | Bobby Holm | 6 ft 0 in (1.83 m) | 200 lb (91 kg) | 1919-01-22 | Seton Hall |
| G/F | | Sammy Kaplan | 5 ft 11 in (1.80 m) | 190 lb (86 kg) | 1912-12-22 | James Madison HS (NY) |
| C | | Herm Knuppel | 6 ft 8 in (2.03 m) | 240 lb (109 kg) | 1915-02-20 | Panzer College |
| F | | Ben Kramer | 6 ft 1 in (1.85 m) | 195 lb (88 kg) | 1913-05-03 | Long Island |
| G | | Tony Krygier | 5 ft 11 in (1.80 m) | 170 lb (77 kg) | 1915-09-25 | Newtown HS (NY) |
| G/F | | Sam Lefkowitz | 6 ft 0 in (1.83 m) | 180 lb (82 kg) | 1912-09-08 | Oregon |
| G/F | | Swede Masin | 6 ft 1 in (1.85 m) | 195 lb (88 kg) | 1920-06-07 | Panzer College |
| G | | Jackie Peters | 5 ft 10 in (1.78 m) | 170 lb (77 kg) | 1916-04-17 | St. John's |
| G/F | | Phil Rabin | 5 ft 9 in (1.75 m) | 150 lb (68 kg) | 1913-07-10 | Long Island |
| G | | Cy Rosenberg | 5 ft 6 in (1.68 m) | 155 lb (70 kg) | 1917-07-24 | Long Island |
| G/F | | Willie Rubenstein | 5 ft 11 in (1.80 m) | 175 lb (79 kg) | 1912-04-03 | NYU |
| G/F | | Irv Zeitlin | 5 ft 10 in (1.78 m) | 175 lb (79 kg) | 1915-05-05 | Long Island |

Coaches
Head coach

Eddie Wilde

Legend
- (DP) Unsigned draft pick
- (FA) Free agent
- (S) Suspended
- Injured

Interestingly, no one would play every single game that the Jewels had in the ABL this season.

== American Basketball League Standings ==
| Pos. | League Standings | Wins | Losses | Win % |
|---|---|---|---|---|
| 1 | Trenton Tigers | 11 | 2 | .846 |
| 2 | Philadelphia SPHAs | 9 | 6 | .600 |
| 3 | Camden Indians / Brooklyn Indians^{[a]} | 3 | 5 | .375 |
| 4 | Harrisburg Senators | 4 | 8 | .333 |
| 5 | New York Jewels | 1 | 7 | .125 |

== Notes ==
^{a} The Camden Indians moved from Camden, New Jersey to nearby Brooklyn, New York on January 18, 1943.
