= 1934–35 New York Jewels season =

- League: American Basketball League (revived original)
- Head coach: Eddie Wilde
- General manager: Eddie Wilde
- Owner(s): Eddie Wilde
- Arena: Arcadia Hall

Results
- Record: 24–16 (.600)
- Place: Conference: 1st (1st half); 5th (2nd half)
- Playoff finish: Lost ABL championship 3–2 to the Brooklyn Visitations.

The 1934–35 New York Jewels season was the fourth professional basketball season played by the New York Jewels franchise, which was their first season played while representing the state of New York as a whole instead of a specific city there like the city of Brooklyn. This season would see them rebrand themselves to represent the entire state of New York instead of just the city of Brooklyn in an attempt to gain greater prominence within not just New York City, but also the state of New York as well. The ABL would enter this season with seven teams competing this time around after the Bronx Americans and Trenton Moose left the league and the Boston Trojans were added as a new team there, though the split season formatting would see them go into six teams by the start of the second half of the season instead due to the also recently rebranded New Britain Jackaways and the Newark Mules merging operations to become the New Britain Mules for that particular half of the season. In any case, the Jewels would end the first half of the season by being the best team of the league there with a 16–6 record for a first place finish in that half of the season, finishing ahead of both the Philadelphia SPHAs / Hebrews and Brooklyn Visitations in the process. However, the second half of the season would be a lot more tense by comparison, with the Jewels ending that half of the season with a below-average 8–10 record for a fifth place finish ahead of only the Boston Trojans. Despite the less-than-stellar finish for the second half of the season, they would automatically qualify for the ABL's championship series between the second half winner against either Philadelphia or Brooklyn, with the Visitations later being the team that the Jewels would go up against this time around. In the rematch of the 1932 MBL championship series, the Jewels and Visitations split the first four games played before the Visitations ended up winning the decisive fifth game of the series with a brutal 26–10 beatdown against the squad representing New York as a whole, denying the Jewels their first championship in the ABL.

== Roster ==
Due to information on American Basketball League players being generally hard to find, there are bound to be more gaps and/or inaccuracies found in certain areas on the team's roster spots than usual.

1934–35 New York Jewels roster
Players

Pos.	No.	Player	Height	Weight	DOB	From
F/C		Matty Begovich	6 ft 5 in (1.96 m)	205 lb (93 kg)	1910-10-02	St. John's
G/F		Manny Bernstein			1911	NYU
C		Charlie Burkhard	6 ft 3 in (1.91 m)	220 lb (100 kg)	1908-05-15	No college
G/F		Rip Gerson	5 ft 10 in (1.78 m)	165 lb (75 kg)	1906-04-06	St. John's
G/F		Mac Kinsbrunner	5 ft 9 in (1.75 m)	155 lb (70 kg)	1909-03-21	St. John's
G/F		Jake Poliskin	6 ft 2 in (1.88 m)	175 lb (79 kg)	1912-02-09	St. John's
G/F		Mac Posnack	5 ft 11 in (1.80 m)	195 lb (88 kg)	1909-06-23	St. John's
G/F		Allie Schuckman	5 ft 8 in (1.73 m)	155 lb (70 kg)	1907-11-25	St. John's
G/F		George Slott	5 ft 11 in (1.80 m)	185 lb (84 kg)	1912-06-09	St. John's
G		Harry Walters	6 ft 0 in (1.83 m)	195 lb (88 kg)	1911-04-06	Cornell

Coaches
Head coach

Eddie Wilde

Legend
- (DP) Unsigned draft pick
- (FA) Free agent
- (S) Suspended
- Injured

Note: Neither Charlie Burkhard nor Harry Walters were a part of the championship series roster for this season.

== American Basketball League Standings ==
First Half
Team	Wins	Losses	Winning %
New York Jewels	16	6	.727
Philadelphia SPHAs / Hebrews	13	10	.565
Brooklyn Visitations	13	11	.542
Newark Mules^{[a]}	12	11	.522
Boston Trojans	10	11	.476
Jersey Reds	7	14	.333
New Britain Jackaways^{[a]}	6	14	.300

Second Half
Team	Wins	Losses	Winning %
Brooklyn Visitations	12	7	.632
Philadelphia SPHAs / Hebrews	12	7	.632
New Britain Mules^{[a]}	9	9	.500
Jersey Reds	9	9	.500
New York Jewels	8	10	.444
Boston Trojans	4	12	.250

== American Basketball League Championship Series ==
New York Jewels (1st Half Champions) Vs. Brooklyn Visitations (2nd Half 1st Place Tiebreaker Champions): Brooklyn Visitations win series 3–2

ABL Championship Series
Game	Date	Opponent	Score	Record
Game 1	April 12	@ New York Jewels	16–26	0–1
Game 2	April 13	N New York Jewels^{[b]}	26–25	1–1
Game 3	April 14	New York Jewels	19–29	1–2
Game 4	April 21	@ New York Jewels	26–25	2–2
Game 5	April 28	@ New York Jewels	10–26	2–3

== Notes ==
^{a} At the end of the first half of the season, the Newark Mules and New Britain Jackaways would merge operations to become the New Britain Mules on January 18, 1935. Because of the merger, the Newark franchise would fold operations by the start of the second half of the season, while the New Britain franchise would continue operations under a (mostly) new roster for the second half of the season.
^{b} Game was played in Philadelphia.
