= 1940–41 New York Jewels season =

- League: American Basketball League (revived original)
- Head coach: Eddie Wilde
- General manager: Eddie Wilde
- Owner(s): Eddie Wilde
- Arena: Royal Windsor Palace

Results
- Record: 17–13 (.567)
- Place: Conference: 2nd (both halves)
- Playoff finish: Did not qualify

The 1940–41 New York Jewels season was the tenth professional basketball season played by the New York Jewels franchise, which was their seventh season played while representing the state of New York as a whole instead of a specific city there like the city of Brooklyn or New Haven, Connecticut. Entering this season, the ABL would only see five teams competing in their league similar to what had happened near the end of the previous season of play, though the Troy Celtics would ironically move from Troy, New York to nearby Brooklyn early on in the season to become the Brooklyn Celtics for the rest of their season going forward due to the Celtics having issues with having a proper home venue to play in on their ends (which could be seen as foreshadowing to what would come up later on for World War II). As a result of the number of teams competing in the league for this season, the ABL would return to the split season formatting that was used throughout the majority of the league's existence at that point in time. For the first half of the season, the Jewels would end up having an above-average 9–5 record to get themselves a second place finish, being two games behind that of the defending champion Philadelphia SPHAs. As for the second half of the season, New York would end up seeing themselves get only an average 8–8 record for yet another second place finish, this time being a few games behind the Brooklyn Celtics there. Despite the Jewels having one of the best records in the league this season, they would end up failing to qualify for the ABL's championship series due to them failing to win either half of the overall season against either the defending champion Philadelphia SPHAs or the since rebranded Brooklyn Celtics.

== Roster ==
Due to information on American Basketball League players being generally hard to find, there are bound to be more gaps and/or inaccuracies found in certain areas on the team's roster spots than usual.

1940–41 New York Jewels roster
Players

Pos.	No.	Player	Height	Weight	DOB	From
G		Hook Anderson	5 ft 11 in (1.80 m)	175 lb (79 kg)	1912-04-08	NYU
C		Al Benson	6 ft 5 in (1.96 m)	220 lb (100 kg)	1914-07-27	Seton Hall
F/C		Irv Davis	6 ft 2 in (1.88 m)	195 lb (88 kg)	1915-01-10	NYU
G/F		Ace Goldstein	6 ft 1 in (1.85 m)	190 lb (86 kg)	1917-03-20	CCNY
G		Leo Gottlieb	5 ft 11 in (1.80 m)	180 lb (82 kg)	1920-11-28	DeWitt Clinton HS (NY)
G		Tony Kappen	5 ft 10 in (1.78 m)	165 lb (75 kg)	1919-04-13	Forest Hills HS (NY)
G/F		Mac Kinsbrunner	5 ft 9 in (1.75 m)	155 lb (70 kg)	1909-03-21	St. John's
G		Tony Krygier	5 ft 11 in (1.80 m)	170 lb (77 kg)	1915-09-25	Newtown HS (NY)
F		Lou Lefkowitz	5 ft 11 in (1.80 m)	175 lb (79 kg)	1917-10-19	CCNY
F		Dutch Newman	6 ft 2 in (1.88 m)	180 lb (82 kg)	1917-04-18	Long Island
F		Red Paris	5 ft 8 in (1.73 m)	150 lb (68 kg)	1918-01-08	CCNY
G		Jackie Peters	5 ft 10 in (1.78 m)	170 lb (77 kg)	1916-04-17	St. John's
G/F		Willie Rubenstein	5 ft 11 in (1.80 m)	175 lb (79 kg)	1912-04-03	NYU
G/F		Allie Schuckman	5 ft 8 in (1.73 m)	155 lb (70 kg)	1907-11-25	St. John's
G/F		George Slott	5 ft 11 in (1.80 m)	185 lb (84 kg)	1912-06-09	St. John's
F		Moe Spahn	6 ft 1 in (1.85 m)	180 lb (82 kg)	1912-05-03	CCNY
C		Red Stevens	6 ft 4 in (1.93 m)	175 lb (79 kg)	1917-12-11	NYU
F/C		Bob Synnott	6 ft 3 in (1.91 m)	190 lb (86 kg)	1912-09-27	Theodore Roosevelt HS (NY)

Coaches
Head coach

Eddie Wilde

Legend
- (DP) Unsigned draft pick
- (FA) Free agent
- (S) Suspended
- Injured

== American Basketball League Standings ==
First Half
Team	Wins	Losses	Winning %
Philadelphia SPHAs	11	4	.733
New York Jewels	9	5	.643
Washington Brewers	7	7	.500
Troy Celtics / Brooklyn Celtics^{[a]}	4	7	.364
Baltimore Clippers	3	11	.214

Second Half
Team	Wins	Losses	Winning %
Brooklyn Celtics^{[a]}	11	4	.733
New York Jewels	8	8	.500
Washington Brewers	7	8	.467
Philadelphia SPHAs	7	9	.438
Baltimore Clippers	6	10	.375

== Notes ==
^{a} At some point during the first half of the season (currently, it's not known exactly when it happened, but it happened sometime in-between November 23 and December 21, 1940 due to those two games being the last date the Troy Celtics played the Philadelphia Sphas and the first date the Brooklyn Celtics played the Philadelphia Sphas respectively), the Troy Celtics moved from Troy, New York to nearby Brooklyn, New York to become the Brooklyn Celtics. However, throughout the entire season, the Celtics would have a tough time filling out home games either in Troy or Brooklyn, meaning there would be home games played in other places with the state of New York, including a game where the Celtics had their home match being played in the venue of the New York Jewels instead of a proper home venue of theirs.
