= 1941–42 New York Jewels season =

- League: American Basketball League (revived original)
- Head coach: Mac Kinsbrunner (player-coach)
- General manager: Mac Kinsbrunner(?)
- Owner(s): Eddie Wilde
- Arena: Arcadia Hall

Results
- Record: 1–6 (.143)
- Place: Conference: 5th (1st half)
- Playoff finish: Did not qualify. (Left the ABL by the end of the first half of the season on January 15, 1942.)

The 1941–42 New York Jewels season was the eleventh professional basketball season played by the New York Jewels franchise, which was their eighth season played while representing the state of New York as a whole instead of a specific city there like the city of Brooklyn or New Haven, Connecticut. It was also the only season in the franchise's history where head coach Eddie Wilde would be replaced by Mac Kinsbrunner, who'd operate as a player-coach for that season. Entering this season, the Jewels were only one of five teams competing in the ABL this season due to the growing presence of World War II encroaching upon the United States of America, though with the Brooklyn Celtics and Baltimore Clippers being replaced by the Trenton Tigers and Wilmington Blue Bombers this time around. Interestingly enough, the Jewels would be the home team of a match played on December 7, 1941 against the Philadelphia Sphas; while the Attack on Pearl Harbor went down on that day of infamy, the Jewels would end up losing a close match to the Sphas with a close 38–37 defeat on their ends. Following that attack, the United States of America would officially enter World War II, which would lead to a decrease in league quality this season, with the Jewels notably only playing in seven total games for the first half of the season. With the combination of the growing presence of World War II and a lack of quality play from the Jewels (with them only winning one single game on their ends this season), the New York squad would end up leaving the ABL by the end of the first half of the season on January 15, 1942 (with the Jewels also playing some exhibition games under their original Brooklyn Jewels name for good measure). However, due to a combination of a lack of viable teams competing in the ABL for another season (with the rivaling National Basketball League going through something similar for its upcoming season as well) and the Jewels being more financially stable by the end of this season, the New York Jewels would end up returning to the ABL for the following season instead of going defunct for good following this season's conclusion.

== Roster ==
Due to information on American Basketball League players being generally hard to find, there are bound to be more gaps and/or inaccuracies found in certain areas on the team's roster spots than usual.

1941–42 New York (/ Brooklyn) Jewels roster
Players

Pos.	No.	Player	Height	Weight	DOB	From
G		Hook Anderson	5 ft 11 in (1.80 m)	175 lb (79 kg)	1912-04-08	NYU
C		Al Benson	6 ft 5 in (1.96 m)	220 lb (100 kg)	1914-07-27	Seton Hall
G		Vince Capraro	5 ft 9 in (1.75 m)	165 lb (75 kg)	1919-11-09	CCNY
G/F		Ace Goldstein	6 ft 1 in (1.85 m)	190 lb (86 kg)	1917-03-20	CCNY
G		Tony Kappen	5 ft 10 in (1.78 m)	165 lb (75 kg)	1919-04-13	Forest Hills HS (NY)
G/F		Mac Kinsbrunner	5 ft 9 in (1.75 m)	155 lb (70 kg)	1909-03-21	St. John's
G		Tony Krygier	5 ft 11 in (1.80 m)	170 lb (77 kg)	1915-09-25	Newtown HS (NY)
G/F		Willie Rubenstein	5 ft 11 in (1.80 m)	175 lb (79 kg)	1912-04-03	NYU
G/F		Butch Schwartz	6 ft 2 in (1.88 m)	190 lb (86 kg)	1919-02-14	Long Island
G		Lou Simon	5 ft 11 in (1.80 m)	155 lb (70 kg)	1916-02-13	Long Island
F		Moe Spahn	6 ft 1 in (1.85 m)	180 lb (82 kg)	1912-05-03	CCNY

Coaches
Head coach

Mac Kinsbrunner

Legend
- (DP) Unsigned draft pick
- (FA) Free agent
- (S) Suspended
- Injured

== American Basketball League Standings ==
First Half
Team	Wins	Losses	Winning %
Wilmington Blue Bombers	10	3	.769
Philadelphia SPHAs	8	6	.571
Washington Brewers	5	6	.455
Trenton Tigers	5	8	.385
New York Jewels^{[a]}	1	6	.143

Second Half
Team	Wins	Losses	Winning %
Wilmington Blue Bombers	8	4	.667
Trenton Tigers	6	6	.500
Philadelphia SPHAs	5	7	.417
Washington Brewers	5	7	.417

== Notes ==
^{a} The New York Jewels would drop out of the ABL by the end of the first half of the season on January 15, 1942.
