= 1935–36 New York Jewels season =

- League: American Basketball League (revived original)
- Head coach: Eddie Wilde
- General manager: Eddie Wilde
- Owner(s): Eddie Wilde
- Arena: Arcadia Hall

Results
- Record: 21–18 (.538)
- Place: Conference: 2nd (1st half); 3rd (2nd half)
- Playoff finish: Did not qualify

The 1935–36 New York Jewels season was the fifth professional basketball season played by the New York Jewels franchise, which was their second season played while representing the state of New York as a whole instead of a specific city there like the city of Brooklyn. Entering this season, the Jewels sought to not only return to the ABL's championship series, but win that league's championship for the first time in their franchise's history and have their second overall championship after previously winning the final championship ever won within the Metropolitan Basketball League. During the first half of the season, the Jewels looked like they would continue to have success with their team by getting an above-average 11–8 record that only put them above the Philadelphia SPHAs / Hebrews for a second place finish there. However, the second half of the season would see a serious disappointment on their ends when they finished the season with an average 10–10 record, which would only be good enough for a third place spot behind the Jersey Reds and the defending ABL champion Brooklyn Visitations, although their placement during that half of the season would be a bit sneaky due to how close every team was during that point in the season. In any case, the Jewels would automatically fail to qualify for any sort of playoff basketball for the first time in their franchise history due to their failure to finish in first place for either half of the season.

== Roster ==
Due to information on American Basketball League players being generally hard to find, there are bound to be more gaps and/or inaccuracies found in certain areas on the team's roster spots than usual.

1935–36 New York Jewels roster
Players

Pos.	No.	Player	Height	Weight	DOB	From
F/C		Matty Begovich	6 ft 5 in (1.96 m)	205 lb (93 kg)	1910-10-02	St. John's
C		Nat Frankel	6 ft 5 in (1.96 m)	180 lb (82 kg)	1905-09-16	Brooklyn
F		Rip Gerson	5 ft 10 in (1.78 m)	165 lb (75 kg)	1906-04-06	St. John's
G/F		Sammy Kaplan	5 ft 9 in (1.75 m)	155 lb (70 kg)	1906-01-28	James Madison HS (NY)
G/F		Mac Kinsbrunner	5 ft 9 in (1.75 m)	155 lb (70 kg)	1909-03-21	St. John's
G/F		Jake Poliskin	6 ft 2 in (1.88 m)	175 lb (79 kg)	1912-02-09	St. John's
G		Mac Posnack	5 ft 11 in (1.80 m)	195 lb (88 kg)	1909-06-23	St. John's
G/F		Honey Russell	5 ft 11 in (1.80 m)	175 lb (79 kg)	1911-09-10	St. John's
G/F		Allie Schuckman	5 ft 8 in (1.73 m)	155 lb (70 kg)	1907-11-25	St. John's
G		Willie Schwartz	6 ft 0 in (1.83 m)	195 lb (88 kg)	1911-04-06	Cornell
G/F		George Slott	5 ft 11 in (1.80 m)	185 lb (84 kg)	1912-06-09	St. John's

Coaches
Head coach

Eddie Wilde

Legend
- (DP) Unsigned draft pick
- (FA) Free agent
- (S) Suspended
- Injured

== American Basketball League Standings ==
First Half
Team	Wins	Losses	Winning %
Philadelphia SPHAs / Hebrews	14	5	.737
New York Jewels	11	8	.579
Brooklyn Visitations	10	10	.500
Jersey Reds	9	9	.500
Kingston Colonials	7	12	.368
Paterson Panthers / Trenton Bengals^{[a]}	4	11	.267

Second Half
Team	Wins	Losses	Winning %
Brooklyn Visitations	12	8	.600
Jersey Reds	11	9	.550
New York Jewels	10	10	.500
Kingston Colonials	9	10	.474
Philadelphia SPHAs / Hebrews	9	11	.450
Passaic Red Devils^{[a]}	8	11	.421

== Notes ==
^{a} During the first half of the season, after losing all five of the games they played this season, the Paterson Panthers would move from Paterson, New Jersey to nearby Trenton, New Jersey on December 12, 1935, to become the newer version of the Trenton Bengals for the rest of the season. Trenton would finish the first half of the season with a 4–6 record for an overall record of 4–11 between the two teams before the Trenton squad moved out to nearby Passaic, New Jersey on December 30, 1935, to play as the Passaic Red Devils by the time the second half of the season began.
