= Internal Wrangler =

Studio album by Clinic
- Released: 1 May 2000
- Recorded: 1999–2000
- Genre: Indie rock, post-punk revival, garage rock
- Length: 30:58
- Label: Domino
- Producer: Gareth Jones; Clinic

Clinic chronology
Clinic (1999)	Internal Wrangler (2000)	Walking with Thee (2002)

Singles from Internal Wrangler
- 1. "The Return of Evil Bill" Released: 10 April 2000; 2. "Distortions" Released: 10 July 2000; 3. "The Second Line" Released: 9 October 2000

Internal Wrangler is the debut studio album by British indie rock band Clinic. It was released on 1 May 2000 through Domino Records.

== Background ==
The band signed to Domino Records following the release of several self-financed singles. The song "The Return of Evil Bill" is a follow-up to the song "Evil Bill" that appeared on the Clinic compilation album, and remains a fan favorite in live shows. The band, particularly lead singer Ade Blackburn, are superstitious and chose not to include a song on the 13th track; instead a four-second silence is heard before the album's final song, "Goodnight Georgie". This is believed to be why the subsequent albums have been no more than 12 songs long until 2010's Bubblegum.

The short interlude track "DJ Shangri-La" is an excerpt of Ludwig van Beethoven's "Moonlight" Piano Sonata No. 14 in C-sharp minor played on a highly overdriven organ, although here it is played in standard 4/4 time, while the original piano motif was in 3/4 time. The song "The Second Line" was used prominently in a Levi's Jeans television advertisement in late 2000, which then led to it being reissued. It also features an interpolation of the song "Cavern" by Liquid Liquid.

The album cover was inspired by Ornette Coleman's 1961 album Ornette!.

== Critical reception ==
Professional ratings
Aggregate scores
Source	Rating
Metacritic	82/100
Review scores
Source	Rating
AllMusic	4/5 stars
Christgau's Consumer Guide	(3-star Honorable Mention)
Drowned in Sound	8/10
The Encyclopedia of Popular Music	4/5 stars
The Guardian	3/5 stars
NME	6/10
Pitchfork	9.3/10
Rolling Stone	3/5 stars
Spin	9/10

The Independent wrote that "this short, sweet and sour debut album packs more imaginative strategies into half an hour than most bands manage in entire careers."

== Track listing ==
All tracks are written by Clinic (Ade Blackburn, Brian Campbell, Jonathan Hartley and Carl Turney).

No.	Title	Length
1.	"Voodoo Wop"	1:41
2.	"The Return of Evil Bill"	2:32
3.	"Internal Wrangler"	3:03
4.	"DJ Shangri-La"	0:52
5.	"The Second Line"	2:28
6.	"C.Q."	1:09
7.	"T.K."	2:31
8.	"Earth Angel"	3:20
9.	"Distortions"	4:01
10.	"Hippy Death Suite"	1:18
11.	"2nd Foot Stomp"	2:52
12.	"2/4"	2:33
13.	Untitled (silence)	0:04
14.	"Goodnight Georgie"	2:34
Total length:		30:58

== Personnel ==
Clinic

- Ade Blackburn – keyboard, melodica, lead vocals
- Brian Campbell – bass, flute, backing vocals
- Jonathan Hartley – lead guitar, clarinet, keyboards
- Carl Turney – drums, piano, backing vocals, additional percussion

Production

- Clinic – production
- Gareth Jones – production

== Charts ==
Chart (2000)	Peak position
UK Albums (OCC)	142
UK Independent Albums (OCC)	25
