= Winchester Cathedral (disambiguation) =

Winchester Cathedral is a cathedral in Winchester.

- Winchester Cathedral Priory (640-1539)

== Music ==
- Winchester Cathedral Choir

=== Albums ===
- Winchester Cathedral (New Vaudeville Band album), 1966
- Winchester Cathedral (Clinic album), 2004
- Winchester Cathedral, album by Lawrence Welk 1992

=== Songs ===
- "Winchester Cathedral" (song), 1966 song composed by Geoff Stephens and performed by the New Vaudeville Band
