= 1920–21 Philadelphia Sphas season =

American basketball team season

- League: American League of Philadelphia
- Head coach: Eddie Gottlieb
- General manager: Eddie Gottlieb
- Owner(s): Southern Philadelphia Hebrew Association; Eddie Gottlieb; Harry Passon; Edwin "Hughie" Black

Results
- Record: 6–8 (.429)
- Place: Conference: T-3rd (1st half) 7th (2nd half) T-6th (overall)
- Playoff finish: No playoffs in ALP

The 1920–21 season was the Philadelphia Sphas' 4th season of play, all while operating within the American League of Philadelphia. Game-by-game records are (currently) not available for this season and are therefore likely lost to time in the process. For the first half of the season, the Sphas finished the season being tied for third place with the Hancock franchise for an above-average 4–3 record, being behind only the Nativity and Post 26 franchises there. However, by the second half of the season, the Sphas would end of having the second-worst performance of that particular half of the season ahead of only the Girard franchise, as the Sphas finished the second half of the season with a poor 2–5 finish for a seventh place ending there. With that being said, when combining the two records together, the Sphas finished the season being tied for sixth place alongside the Logan franchise, as their overall 6–8 below average finish ended up getting them ahead of only the Kaywood and Girard franchises for overall records this season.

Due to the Spanish flu pandemic being at its end alongside World War I already being over with beforehand, the American League of Philadelphia would continue to not see any sort of coverage under most publications by comparison to other professional basketball leagues of its time (including a World Series of Basketball being implemented during this season through multiple professional basketball leagues during this time).

== American League of Philadelphia Standings ==
First Half
Team	Wins	Losses	Winning %
Philadelphia Post 26	7	0	1.000
Philadelphia Nativity	5	2	.714
Philadelphia Hancock	4	3	.571
Philadelphia SPHAs	4	3	.571
Philadelphia 50 Club	3	4	.429
Philadelphia Logan	2	5	.286
Philadelphia Kaywood	2	5	.286
Philadelphia Girard	1	6	.143

Second Half
Team	Wins	Losses	Winning %
Philadelphia Hancock	6	1	.857
Philadelphia 50 Club	5	2	.714
Philadelphia Logan	4	3	.571
Philadelphia Post 26	4	3	.571
Philadelphia Nativity	4	3	.571
Philadelphia Kaywood	3	4	.429
Philadelphia SPHAs	2	5	.286
Philadelphia Girard	0	7	.000

Overall
Team	Wins	Losses	Winning %
Philadelphia Post 26	11	3	.786
Philadelphia Hancock	10	4	.714
Philadelphia Nativity	9	5	.643
Philadelphia 50 Club	8	6	.571
Philadelphia Logan	6	8	.429
Philadelphia SPHAs	6	8	.429
Philadelphia Kaywood	5	9	.417
Philadelphia Girard	1	13	.071
