= Free Reign =

Studio album by Clinic
- Released: 13 November 2012
- Genres: Pop, Rock
- Length: 39:30
- Label: Domino

Clinic chronology
| Bubblegum (2010) | Free Reign (2012) | Wheeltappers and Shunters (2019) |

Professional ratings
Aggregate scores
| Source | Rating |
|---|---|
| Metacritic | 74/100 |
Review scores
| Source | Rating |
| Allmusic | 4/5 stars |
| This Is Fake DIY | 8/10 |
| Slant Magazine | 4/5 stars |
| Clash Magazine | 8/10 |
| Filter Magazine | 83% |
| Pitchfork Media | 7.1/10 |
| PopMatters | 7/10 |
| Paste Magazine | 7/10 |
| Under the Radar | 6.5/10 |
| The Guardian | 3/5 stars |
| Consequence of Sound | 3/5 stars |
| No Ripcord | 6/10 |

Free Reign is the seventh studio album by English rock band Clinic. It was released in November 2012 under Domino Records.

== Track list ==
| No. | Title | Length |
|---|---|---|
| 1. | "Misty" | 5:08 |
| 2. | "See Saw" | 5:27 |
| 3. | "Seamless Boogie Woogie" | 3:36 |
| 4. | "Cosmic Radiation" | 2:54 |
| 5. | "Miss You" | 5:39 |
| 6. | "For the Season" | 3:48 |
| 7. | "King Kong" | 3:14 |
| 8. | "You" | 5:36 |
| 9. | "Sun and the Moon" | 4:08 |
