= Walking with Thee =

Studio album by Clinic
- Released: 25 February 2002
- Recorded: 2001
- Genres: Indie rock; neo-psychedelia
- Length: 38:14
- Label: Domino
- Producers: Ben Hillier; Clinic

Clinic chronology
Internal Wrangler (2000)	Walking with Thee (2002)	Winchester Cathedral (2004)

Singles from Walking with Thee
- 1. "Walking with Thee" Released: 18 February 2002; 2. "Come into Our Room" Released: 13 May 2002

Professional ratings
Aggregate scores
Source	Rating
Metacritic	79/100
Review scores
Source	Rating
AllMusic	3.5/5 stars
Blender	4/5 stars
Chicago Sun-Times	3.5/4 stars
Entertainment Weekly	A−
The Guardian	4/5 stars
NME	6/10
Pitchfork	7.2/10
Rolling Stone	4/5 stars
Spin	8/10
Uncut	4/5 stars

Walking with Thee is the second studio album by British indie rock band Clinic. It was released on 25 February 2002 on Domino Records.

Walking with Thee was included in Rolling Stone's "50 Best Albums of 2002". In 2003, it was nominated for the Grammy Award for Best Alternative Music Album, but lost to Coldplay's A Rush of Blood to the Head.

== Track listing ==
All tracks are written by Clinic (Ade Blackburn, Brian Campbell, Jonathan Hartley and Carl Turney).

No.	Title	Length
1.	"Harmony"	4:02
2.	"The Equaliser"	3:43
3.	"Welcome"	3:02
4.	"Walking with Thee"	2:36
5.	"Pet Eunuch"	2:05
6.	"Mr. Moonlight"	4:00
7.	"Come into Our Room"	3:50
8.	"The Vulture"	3:40
9.	"The Bridge"	3:23
10.	"Sunlight Bathes Our Home"	4:14
11.	"For the Wars"	3:39
Total length:		38:14

== Personnel ==
Clinic

- Ade Blackburn – keyboard, melodica, lead vocals
- Brian Campbell – bass, flute, backing vocals
- Jonathan Hartley – lead guitar, clarinet, keyboards
- Carl Turney – drums, piano, backing vocals, additional percussion

Production

- Clinic – production
- Ben Hillier – production

== Charts ==
Chart (2002)	Peak position
UK Albums (Official Charts)	133
UK Independent Albums (Official Charts)	20
US Independent Albums (Billboard)	29
