= Do It! (album) =

Studio album by Clinic
- Released: 7 April 2008
- Genre: Psychedelic rock
- Length: 32:55
- Label: Domino Recording Company

Clinic chronology
Funf (2007)	Do It! (2008)	Bubblegum (2010)

Professional ratings
Aggregate scores
Source	Rating
Metacritic	69/100
Review scores
Source	Rating
Allmusic	4/5 stars
Blender	3/5 stars
Drowned In Sound	8/10 stars
The Independent	4/5 stars
Pitchfork Media	(7.7/10)
The Stranger	3/4 stars

Do It! is the fifth album by the band Clinic, released on 7 April 2008. The single "Free Not Free" (with b-side "Thor") was made available on 1 February 2008 as a free download from clinicvoot.org. "Witch (Made to Measure)" was released as the second single in May 2008. "Tomorrow" was released as a single on 24 November.

== Track listing ==
1. "Memories" – 2:37
2. "Tomorrow" – 3:30
3. "The Witch (Made to Measure)" – 3:14
4. "Free Not Free" – 3:03
5. "Shopping Bag" – 2:19
6. "Corpus Christi" – 3:09
7. "Emotions" – 2:53
8. "High Coin" – 3:06
9. "Mary and Eddie" – 2:57
10. "Winged Wheel" – 2:56
11. "Coda" – 3:18

== Personnel ==
- Ade Blackburn — Keyboard, Melodica, Lead Vocals
- Brian Campbell — Bass, Flute, Backing Vocals
- Hartley — Lead Guitar, Clarinet, Keyboards
- Carl Turney — Drums, Piano, Backing Vocals, Additional Percussion
