= 1917–18 Philadelphia Sphas season =

Basketball season of the Philadelphia Sphas

1917–18 Philadelphia YMHA season
- League: American League of Philadelphia
- Head coach: Eddie Gottlieb
- General manager: Eddie Gottlieb
- Owner(s): Philadelphia Young Men's Hebrew Association; Eddie Gottlieb; Edwin "Hughie" Black; Harry Passon

Results
- Record: 4–11 (.267)
- Place: Conference: T-5th
- Playoff finish: No playoffs in ALP

The 1917–18 season was the first season for the team that would become the Philadelphia Sphas. While playing in the minor-league American Basketball League of Philadelphia, the team was originally known as the Philadelphia YMHA during the Great War period due to them being sponsored by the local Philadelphia branch of the Young Men's Hebrew Association in a collaborative effort involving three of the team's players this season in Harry Passon, Edwin "Hughie" Black, and team general manager/player-coach Eddie Gottlieb, the last of whom would eventually create the unrelated Philadelphia Warriors franchise in 1946 for the Basketball Association of America (now known as the Golden State Warriors in the National Basketball Association). Game-by-game records are (currently) not available for this season and are therefore likely lost to time in the process. In any case, the Philadelphia YMHA franchise would finish their inaugural season with a 4–11 record, being tied for last place in the six team league with a local Young Men's Christian Association franchise in the Philadelphia Port Richmond YMCA. This season would also see the American League of Philadelphia that the local YMHA team that later become the Sphas competed in ultimately not be regarded as either a major league or a minor league by some sporting publications for this season of play. Following this season's conclusion, the local Young Men's Hebrew Association would renege upon their agreed partnership with Black, Gottlieb, and Passon (the three main contributors of this team) due to them not liking how violent the professional (or even semi-professional) scene was for the sport of basketball at this point in time, thus leaving the trio of young players to find a new group to partner up with for their next local season of play.

== American League of Philadelphia Standings ==
League Standings
Team	Wins	Losses	Win %
Philadelphia St. Columba	14	1	.933
Philadelphia Hancock	9	6	.600
Brotherhood Beth Israel	8	7	.533
Girard Alumni	6	9	.400
Philadelphia YMHA	4	11	.267
Philadelphia Port Richmond YMCA	4	11	.267
