= Funf =

2007 compilation album by Clinic

Compilation album by Clinic
- Released: 18 June 2007
- Genre: Indie
- Length: 29:17
- Label: Domino

Clinic chronology
Visitations (2006)	Funf (2007)	Do It! (2008)

Professional ratings
Review scores
Source	Rating
Twisted Ear	link
Rockfeedback	link

Funf is a compilation of B-sides from the band Clinic's first ten years, released in 2007.

== Track listing ==
1. "The Majestic" – 2:01
2. "Nicht" – 1:32
3. "Christmas" – 3:15
4. "The Castle" – 2:50
5. "You Can't Hurt You Anymore" – 2:07
6. "Dissolution: The Dream of Bartholomew" – 2:40
7. "Magic Boots" – 1:45
8. "The Scythe" – 2:14
9. "Lee Shan" – 3:16
10. "J.O./Love Is Just a Tool" – 2:55
11. "Circle I" – 1:34
12. "Golden Rectangle" – 3:08

== Personnel ==
- Ade Blackburn – keyboard, melodica, lead vocals
- Brian Campbell – bass, flute, backing vocals
- Hartley – lead guitar, clarinet, keyboards
- Carl Turney – drums, piano, backing vocals, additional percussion
