= Bubblegum (Clinic album) =

Studio album by Clinic
- Released: 4 October 2010
- Recorded: Elevator Studios, Liverpool
- Genre: Indie rock
- Length: 39:51
- Label: Domino Records
- Producer: John Congleton

Clinic chronology
Do It! (2008)	Bubblegum (2010)	Free Reign (2012)

Singles from Bubblegum
- 1. "I'm Aware" Released: 20 September 2010; 2. "Bubblegum" Released: 31 January 2011

Professional ratings
Aggregate scores
Source	Rating
Metacritic	73/100
Review scores
Source	Rating
Allmusic	4/5 stars
The A.V. Club	B+
Rockfeedback	3/5 stars
NME	(6/10)
The Phoenix	3/4 stars
Pitchfork Media	(6.7/10)
Popmatters	(8/10)
Slant Magazine	3/5 stars
Spin	(7/10)
Uncut	3/5 stars

Bubblegum is the sixth album by Clinic, released on 4 October 2010.

The album was produced by John Congleton and recorded at Elevator Studios in Liverpool. Lead single "I'm Aware" was released on 20 September 2010, with a second single, "Bubblegum", on 31 January 2011.

== Track listing ==
1. "I'm Aware" – 2:59
2. "Bubblegum" – 2:53
3. "Baby" – 3:59
4. "Lion Tamer" – 3:00
5. "Linda" – 2:44
6. "Milk & Honey" – 3:13
7. "The Radio Story" – 2:13
8. "Forever (Demis' Blues)" – 3:11
9. "Another Way of Giving" – 3:15
10. "Evelyn" – 3:51
11. "Un Astronauta En Cielo" – 2:15
12. "Freemasons Waltz" – 3:27
13. "Orangutan" – 3:00
