= Clinic (band) =

English rock band

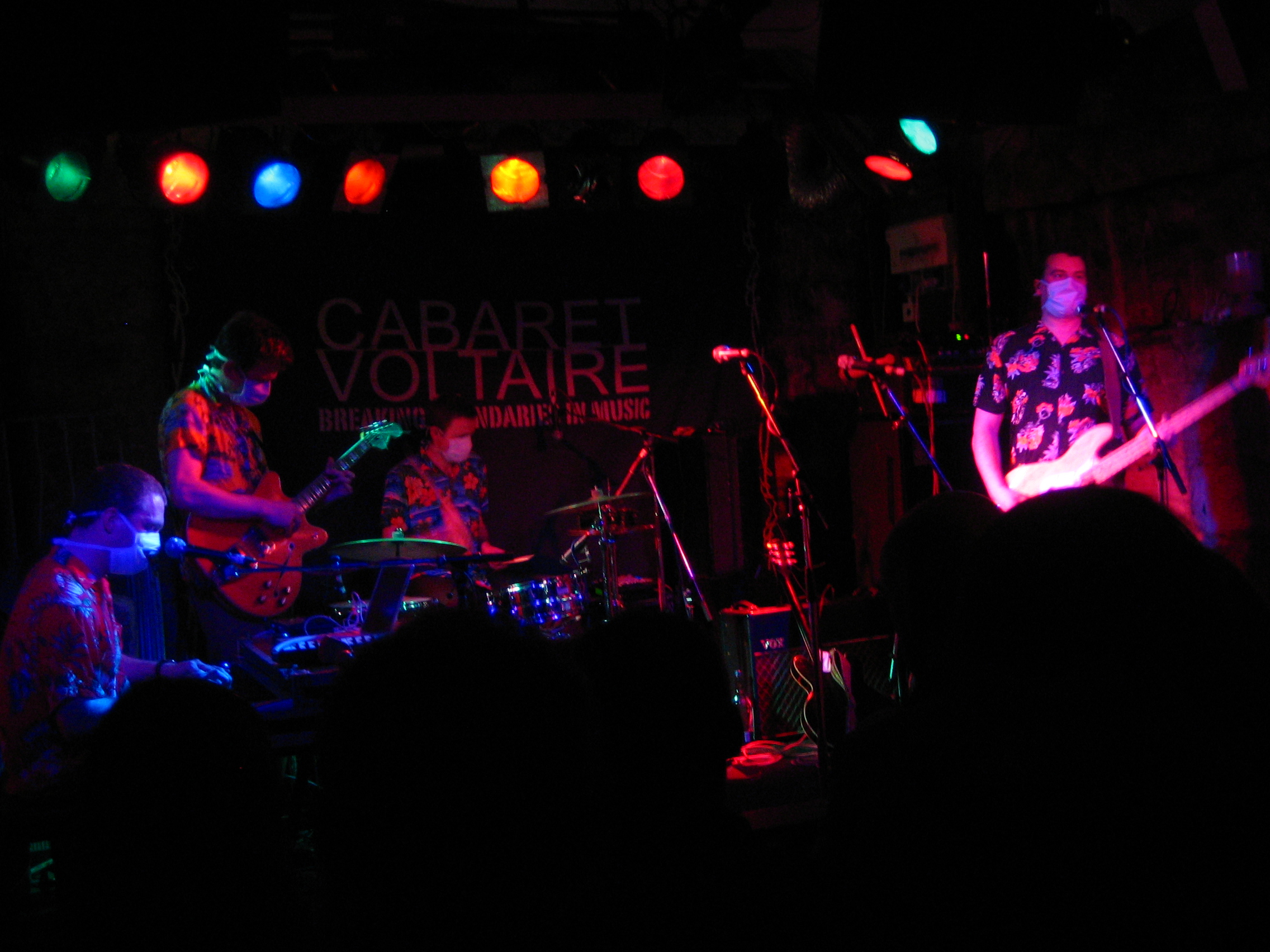
- Clinic performing in Edinburgh, 2008

Background information
- Origin: Crosby, Sefton, England
- Genres: Indie rock, post-punk revival, garage rock, neo-psychedelia
- Years active: 1993–present
- Label: Domino
- Members: Adrian "Ade" Blackburn; Jonathan Hartley
- Past members: Brian Campbell; Carl Turney

Clinic are an English psych rock band, formed in 1993 in Crosby, Liverpool by frontman Ade Blackburn, guitarist Jonathan Hartley, bassist Brian Campbell and drummer Carl Turney. The band were originally named Pure Morning.

Following the release of Free Reign in 2012 the band went on a seven-year break before returning with Wheeltappers and Shunters, the first album written solely by Blackburn and Hartley. The band's latest album Fantasy Island only features Blackburn and Hartley, with press shots confirming the departure of Campbell and Turney. The band's business Clinic Voot Ltd. was dissolved in August 2019.

The band are signed to Domino, and are noted for wearing surgical masks and outfits in concert and press shots. Blackburn has stated that this is an homage to San Francisco bands Crime and The Residents, and that "I like the way there was a visual side to what they did, but it wasn't something too serious. It was like a tacky pun on the band name. I liked something a bit more ridiculous like that."

== History ==
=== Formation and early recordings ===
Vocalist and rhythm guitarist Ade Blackburn and lead guitarist Jonathan Hartley formed the earliest incarnation of the band around 1984, initially known as Sunny Rainy Afterlife, and offering home-made demo cassettes through a local free-circulation magazine. By the late 1980s, the band had renamed itself Jellystone Park, with Blackburn and Hartley joined by drummer Steve "Captain" Dougherty, who later went on to join Creation signings One Lady Owner, and bassist Derek Finn. Following a brief hiatus, and a one-off appearance by Blackburn and Hartley in a covers act, Sean Durney's L-Ego, supporting the post-A Flock of Seagulls combo An Almighty Atmosphere, Dougherty was replaced in 1988 by Sean Durney, previously drummer with an acoustic agit-pop outfit also part of a mini-scene centred on the Birkey pub in Crosby, Liverpool. The band by this time was based in a former storage room at the Regent Bingo Hall in Crosby (now St Mary's College Sports Centre), where Blackburn was a bingo caller. Finn departed and was replaced by Rich Stevens, and following his departure, for a short period by Paul Entwhistle, also of Liverpool band Spontaneous Cattle Combustion. Entwhistle was subsequently replaced by Brian Campbell after Durney spotted him playing in a band at The Crosby Squash Club. The band recorded two demos in 1991 (both of which were released as digital downloads by Museum Records under the name of Jellystone Park in 2011, and The Dark Side of the Birkey in 2012) along with a flexi-disc in 1992. Durney also departed in 1993, being replaced on the drums by Carl Turney, an associate of Campbell, and the band renamed itself Pure Morning, recording an album, Two Inch Helium Buddah, for Radar Records in 1996.

With the line-up unchanged, the band again renamed itself to Clinic the following year and soon developed early notoriety for featuring instruments (primarily keyboards/organs) that were acquired at various jumble sales and flea markets. Shortly after, the EP I.P.C. Subeditors Dictate Our Youth was released on their own Aladdin's Cave of Golf record label. The EP made the top ten of John Peel's Festive Fifty at the end of the year, and two other self-financed singles followed in 1998.

=== Signing to Domino Records ===
In 1999, the band signed to Domino Records and the first three singles were compiled on a single CD or LP. Their debut album, Internal Wrangler, was released in 2000. Album tracks "The Second Line", "The Return of Evil Bill" and "Distortions" were released as singles; "The Second Line" was later reissued after being used in a television advertisement for Levi's jeans. In the same year, the band played at All Tomorrow's Parties and Scott Walker's Meltdown, and toured with Radiohead. Internal Wrangler was voted Number 9 in Pitchfork's best albums of the year.

=== 2002–2019 ===
Two further albums, Walking with Thee (which was nominated for a Grammy for Best Alternative Album) and Winchester Cathedral, followed in 2002 and 2004, respectively, along with tours with The Flaming Lips and an appearance on the Late Show with David Letterman, performing "Walking with Thee". "Come into Our Room", the second single from Walking with Thee, was featured on an episode of "The O.C.", as well as an episode of CSI: Crime Scene Investigation, and was included on the series' soundtrack album. Additionally, another song from Walking with Thee, "The Equaliser", was featured in the 2003 indie film Thirteen. The band released their fourth album, Visitations, in October 2006. "Tusk", the first single from the album, was made available as a free download from the band's official website in February 2006, and "Harvest (Within You)" preceded the album as a single in early October.

Funf, a compilation album of b-sides, was released in June 2007. Clinic also appeared with Roky Erickson at Jarvis Cocker's 2007 Meltdown Festival and later in the year toured with Arcade Fire. "If You Could Read Your Mind" from Visitations was used in the arthouse film Hallam Foe the same autumn.

2008 saw the release of the uncharacteristically mellow single "Free Not Free", preceding their fifth album Do It!. The single was released as a free download from the band's website. The download also contained the B-side, "Thor". The band later released "The Witch (Made to Measure)" as the second single from the album, and "Tomorrow" as the third. After touring to promote the album, in May 2009, Clinic played the Moondog tribute concert at the Barbican in London, performing "Oboe Round".

The band's sixth album, Bubblegum, produced by John Congleton was released on 4 October 2010. A press release stated that the album was a marked change in direction from their trademark "hyped-up sound". The acoustic-based lead single from the album, "I'm Aware", was released on 20 September 2010, and a second single, the titular wah-led "Bubblegum", came out on 31 January 2011.

The band released an EP of cover versions, Ladies Night, in support of Record Store Day, on 16 April 2011; the main track was a version of Man 2 Man's "Male Stripper". In March 2012, the band was invited to support The Shins at the Forum in Kentish Town. They performed the new song "Seamless Boogie Woogie Rpt BBC2 10pm". In April 2012, the song "D.P." from the band's debut EP was used in a TV advertisement for Weetabix breakfast cereal.

The LP Free Reign was released in 2012 and mixed by Daniel Lopatin and the band. The album was markedly different from Bubblegum with more of an electronic/keyboard based sound. After a sabbatical Clinic performed with John Cale at his 'Velvet Underground and Nico' LP show in May 2016 in Liverpool.

=== 2019–present ===
Following a seven-year break, the band released Wheeltappers and Shunters in 2019, with only Blackburn and Hartley receiving songwriting credits. There was no tour in support of the album.

In July 2021, the band announced what would have been their first national tour since 2012. However, the tour was cancelled without explanation or any announcement. They released Fantasy Island in October 2021 via Domino Records, again with only Blackburn and Hartley receiving songwriting credits. Press shots for the album also only featured Blackburn and Hartley.

In September 2026, Clinic announced the release of their 10th album Wild in the Streets, set to come out on October 30th. Blackburns describes the album as one inspired by dub reggae, early rock 'n' roll, and exotica.

== Band members ==
=== Current members ===
- Adrian "Ade" Blackburn – lead vocals, guitars, keyboards, melodica, bass (1993–present)
- Jonathan Hartley – guitars, keyboards, clarinet, drums, bass (1993–present)

=== Former members ===
- Brian Campbell – bass guitar, flute, backing vocals (1993–2019)
- Carl Turney – drums, piano, backing vocals (1993–2019)

== Discography ==
=== Studio albums ===
Title	Album details	Peak chart positions		
Title	Album details	UK	UK Indie	US Indie
Internal Wrangler	Released: 1 May 2000; Label: Domino (#WIG78); Formats: CD, LP	142	25	—
Walking with Thee	Released: 25 February 2002; Label: Domino (#WIG100); Formats: CD, LP	133	20	29
Winchester Cathedral	Released: 23 August 2004; Label: Domino (#WIG144); Formats: CD, LP	—	29	—
Visitations	Released: 16 October 2006; Label: Domino (#WIG181); Formats: CD, LP	—	47	—
Do It!	Released: 7 April 2008; Label: Domino (#WIG165); Formats: CD, LP	—	42	—
Bubblegum	Released: 4 October 2010; Label: Domino (#WIG261); Formats: CD, LP	—	—	—
Free Reign	Released: 13 November 2012; Label: Domino (#WIG295); Formats: CD, LP	—	—	—
Wheeltappers and Shunters	Released: 10 May 2019; Label: Domino (#WIG424); Formats: CD, LP	—	33	—
Fantasy Island	Released: 22 October 2021; Label: Domino (#WIG486); Formats: CD, LP	—	—	—
Wild in the Streets	Released: 30 October 2026; Label: Domino (#WIG567); Formats: CD, LP	—	—	—
"—" denotes items that did not chart or were not released in that territory.

=== Compilation albums ===
Title	Album details
Clinic	Released: 19 April 1999; Label: Domino (#WIG64); Formats: CD, LP
Funf	Released: 18 June 2007; Label: Domino (#WIG192); Formats: CD, LP
Free Reign II	Released: 4 March 2013; Label: Domino (#WIG303); Formats: CD, LP, download

=== EPs ===
- Operating at a Theatre Near You Vol. 1 (2004)
- Ladies Night (2011)

=== Singles ===
Year	Title	Peak chart positions			Album
Year	Title	UK	UK Indie	SCO	Album
1997	"I.P.C. Subeditors Dictate Our Youth"	—	—	—	Clinic
1998	"Monkey on Your Back"	—	—	—	Clinic
1998	"Cement Mixer"	—	—	—	Clinic
1999	"The Second Line"	112	24	—	Internal Wrangler
2000	"The Return of Evil Bill"	70	13	88	Internal Wrangler
2000	"Distortions"	80	15	—	Internal Wrangler
2000	"The Second Line" (re-release)	56	10	62	Internal Wrangler
2002	"Walking with Thee"	65	13	79	Walking with Thee
2002	"Come into Our Room"	85	20	—	Walking with Thee
2004	"The Magician"	77	11	—	Winchester Cathedral
2004	"Circle of Fifths"	89	23	—	Winchester Cathedral
2006	"Tusk"	—	—	—	Visitations
2006	"Harvest"	137	6	—	Visitations
2007	"If You Could Read Your Mind"	—	6	—	Visitations
2008	"Free Not Free"	—	—	—	Do It!
2008	"The Witch (Made to Measure)"	—	—	—	Do It!
2008	"Tomorrow"	—	37	—	Do It!
2010	"I'm Aware"	—	—	—	Bubblegum
2011	"Bubblegum"	—	—	—	Bubblegum
2012	"Miss You"	—	—	—	Free Reign
2021	"Fine Dining"	—	—	—	Fantasy Island
"—" denotes items that did not chart or were not released in that territory.
