= The Clinic (game) =

Quiz game

- Players: 2 or more
- Playing time: 30-45 minutes
- Chance: Medium
- Age range: 14 and over

The Clinic is a psychological quiz game based on celebrity and popular culture, ideally for use as a party game. It was developed by Winning Moves UK in 2008.

The Clinic's gameplay is similar to psychological profile quizzes found in magazines, where players answer a series of multiple choice questions and eventually arrive at a set psychological profile at the end.

The game's name and theme comes from the UK media obsession with fame, celebrity, and the pressures of being in the spotlight, as illustrated by publications such as Heat (magazine), OK!, Hello!, the London Lite and thelondonpaper. It seeks to play on the notion that any normal person can be thrust into the limelight via reality and talent shows such as Big Brother or The X Factor.

== How to play ==
The gameplay is designed to encourage discussion and banter over players' questions and answers, many of which are humorous and edgy in nature.

Play begins when one player draws a question card from the pile and asks that question of the player to their left, along with the four multiple choice answers. The player gives the answer that they feel best applies. The questioner then looks at the question card to see whether the player has given a Mad, Bad, Sad or Glad answer. The player who has answered then makes an answer on their clipboard in the appropriate section, Mad, Bad, Sad or Glad.

Play continues until all players have been asked the set number of questions. At this point, players add up the marks on their clipboard in the four sections, which gives them a tally of Mad, Bad, Sad or Glad. For example, if a player has:

Mad: 10
Bad: 5
Sad: 4
Glad: 11

Then their profile will be Glad, Mad, Bad, Sad, or GMBS. Players then look up their profile in the Clinic Analysis Book, which gives them a full psychological profile, including which celebrities they are most like, which celebrity friends they might socialise with, what television shows they might appear on, and a final Clinic Rating which answers the game's opening question of "Are You Mad?"

== Unprofessional Opinion cards ==
Several of the question cards in The Clinic are Unprofessional Opinion cards. Instead of the player answering these questions, all the other players vote on which answer they think best applies to that player. This leads to further discussion, debate and banter as players try to agree on an answer, and also allows for subterfuge as players can influence the other players' final GBMS tally by voting for a specific answer.
