= Clinic (album) =

Compilation album by Clinic
- Released: 19 April 1999
- Recorded: 1997/1998
- Genre: Indie rock
- Length: 25:30
- Label: Domino Records
- Producer: Rob Ferrier

Clinic chronology
Clinic (1999)	Internal Wrangler (2000)

Singles from Clinic
- 1. "I.P.C. Subeditors Dictate Our Youth" Released: 1997; 2. "Monkey on Your Back" Released: 1998; 3. "Cement Mixer" Released: 1998

Professional ratings
Review scores
Source	Rating
Allmusic	3.5/5 stars
Pitchfork Media	(8.0/10)

Clinic is a compilation album of the first three EPs by Clinic.

The EPs included are I.P.C. Subeditors Dictate Our Youth (1997) (tracks 1–3), Monkey on Your Back (1998) (tracks 4–6) and Cement Mixer (1998) (tracks 7–9).

== Track listing ==
1. "I.P.C. Subeditors Dictate Our Youth" – 3:00
2. "Porno" – 3:51
3. "D.P." – 1:49
4. "Monkey on Your Back" – 2:53
5. "D.T." – 2:12
6. "Evil Bill" – 3:05
7. "Cement Mixer" – 2:49
8. "Kimberley" – 3:09
9. "Voot" – 2:35
