= Visitations (Clinic album) =

Studio album by Clinic
- Released: 16 October 2006
- Genre: Indie rock
- Length: 32:33
- Label: Domino

Clinic chronology
Winchester Cathedral (2004)	Visitations (2006)	Funf (2007)

Professional ratings
Aggregate scores
Source	Rating
Metacritic	72/100
Review scores
Source	Rating
Allmusic	4/5 stars
Entertainment Weekly	A
The Guardian	3/5 stars
The Independent	4/5 stars
MusicOMH	4/5 stars
Pitchfork	(7.0/10)
PopMatters	(7/10)

Visitations is the fourth album by indie rock band Clinic, released on 16 October 2006 on Domino. The video for the single "Harvest (Within You)" was a featured video on YouTube.

== Critical reception ==
Visitations was met with "generally favorable" reviews from critics. At Metacritic, which assigns a weighted average rating out of 100 to reviews from mainstream publications, the release received an average score of 72, based on 23 reviews.

== Track listing ==
1. "Family" – 3:14
2. "Animal/Human" – 2:19
3. "Gideon" – 3:15
4. "Harvest (Within You)" – 3:23
5. "Tusk" – 1:47
6. "Paradise" – 3:06
7. "Children of Kellogg" – 3:40
8. "If You Could Read Your Mind" – 2:59
9. "Jigsaw Man" – 2:33
10. "Interlude" – 0:25
11. "The New Seeker" – 3:00
12. "Visitations" – 3:01

== Singles ==
- "Tusk" (7 February 2006 – free download-only single, available for a limited time at clinicvoot.org)
- "Harvest" (2 October 2006)
- "If You Could Read Your Mind" (5 February 2007)

== Personnel ==
- Ade Blackburn – keyboard, melodica, lead vocals
- Brian Campbell – bass, flute, backing vocals
- Hartley – lead guitar, clarinet, keyboards
- Carl Turney – drums, piano, backing vocals, additional percussion

== Charts ==
Chart performance for Visitations
Chart (2006)	Peak position
UK Independent Albums (Official Charts)	47
