= Ken Norton (basketball) =

American college basketball coach

- Norton, c. 1957

Biographical details
- Born: May 7, 1914; Long Island, New York, U.S.
- Died: July 11, 1996 (aged 82); Hendersonville, North Carolina, U.S.

Playing career
- 1934–1937: LIU
- 1937–1938: New York Jewels

Coaching career (HC unless noted)
- 1938–1942: La Salle Military Academy
- 1946–1968: Manhattan

Administrative career (AD unless noted)
- 1949–1979: Manhattan

Head coaching record
- Overall: 300–205 (.594)
- Tournaments: NCAA: 1–3 (.250); NIT: 2–9 (.182); NAIA: 2–1 (.667)

Accomplishments and honors

Championships
- 4x Metro NY Conference championships (1949, 1953, 1955, 1959); 2x MCC championships (1966, 1967)

Kenneth Anthony Norton (May 7, 1914 – July 11, 1996) was an American college basketball coach. He was the head coach of the Manhattan Jaspers from 1946 to 1968.

Nicknamed "Red", Norton played high school baseball and basketball at Jamaica High School in Queens, and played college basketball under coach Clair Bee at Long Island University (LIU). Norton received a bachelor's degree from LIU, and a master's degree from New York University. He played basketball professionally for the New York Jewels of the American Basketball League. Prior to taking the job at Manhattan, Norton spent four seasons as the head coach at the La Salle Military Academy in Oakdale, New York. He served in the Navy during World War II.

Norton coached Manhattan to a 300–205 record, winning six conference championships and leading the team to eleven postseason appearances, including two Division I National Collegiate Athletic Association (NCAA) and six National Invitation Tournament (NIT) tourneys. At the time of his death, The New York Times reported that he was the top winning coach in the school's history. His 1957–58 team upset the top seed West Virginia Mountaineers, led by Jerry West, in the first round of the NCAA tournament. In the early 1950s Norton guided one of his players, Junius Kellogg, in initiating and assisting an investigation that led to the uncovering of substantial point shaving activity that was taking place in college basketball at the time. Kellogg had been approached by former Manhattan players Hank Poppe and Jack Byrnes to fix games.

After stepping away from coaching basketball, Norton, who also coached baseball and golf at Manhattan, stayed on as the school’s athletic director until his retirement in 1979. In 1977, he led the Jaspers to the Metropolitan Golf Association (MGA) Intercollegiate Championship.

Norton was inducted into the Jasper Hall of Fame in 1989.

Norton died in 1996 at age 82 in Hendersonville, North Carolina.

== Head coaching record ==
Record table
Season	Team	Overall	Conference	Standing	Postseason
Manhattan Jaspers (Metropolitan New York Conference) (1946–1963)
1946–47	Manhattan	13–13	1–5	5th	
1947–48	Manhattan	22–6	3–3	T–3rd	NAIA Quarterfinals
1948–49	Manhattan	18–8	5–1	T–1st	NIT First Round
1949–50	Manhattan	14–11	3–3	T–3rd	
1950–51	Manhattan	16–6	3–2	T–3rd	
1951–52	Manhattan	12–9	4–2	T–2nd	
1952–53	Manhattan	20–6	6–0	1st	NIT Fourth Place
1953–54	Manhattan	15–11	3–3	T–3rd	NIT First Round
1954–55	Manhattan	18–5	6–0	1st	NIT First Round
1955–56	Manhattan	16–8	4–1	2nd	NCAA first round
1956–57	Manhattan	5–9	2–2	T–3rd	NIT Quarterfinals
1957–58	Manhattan	16–10	3–1	2nd	NCAA Sweet Sixteen
1958–59	Manhattan	15–6	4–0	1st	NIT First Round
1959–60	Manhattan	13–11	2–2	4th	
1960–61	Manhattan	8–11	1–2	5th	
1961–62	Manhattan	12–10	1–3	T–5th	
1962–63	Manhattan	9–14	0–4	7th	
Manhattan Jaspers (Independent) (1963–1965)
1963–64	Manhattan	11–11			
1964–65	Manhattan	13–11			NIT Quarterfinals
Manhattan Jaspers (Metropolitan Collegiate Conference) (1965–1968)
1965–66	Manhattan	13–9	8–1	1st	NIT First Round
1966–67	Manhattan	13–8	7–2	T–1st	
1967–68	Manhattan	8–14	3–5	7th	
Manhattan:		300–205 (.594)	69–42 (.622)		
Total:		300–205 (.594)			
National champion Postseason invitational champion Conference regular season champion Conference regular season and conference tournament champion Division regular season champion Division regular season and conference tournament champion Conference tournament champion

== See also ==
- CCNY point shaving scandal
- Hotel Roosevelt fire
