= Winchester Cathedral (Clinic album) =

Studio album by Clinic
- Released: 23 August 2004
- Recorded: 2004
- Genre: Indie rock
- Length: 36:53
- Label: Domino
- Producer: Ken Thomas, Clinic

Clinic chronology
Walking With Thee (2002)	Winchester Cathedral (2004)	Visitations (2006)

Professional ratings
Aggregate scores
Source	Rating
Metacritic	66/100
Review scores
Source	Rating
AllMusic	3/5 stars
The Guardian	4/5 stars
Mojo	2/5 stars
Pitchfork Media	6.9/10
Playlouder	3.5/5 stars
Q	2/5 stars
Rolling Stone	3/5 stars
Uncut	3.5/5 stars
The Village Voice	A−

Winchester Cathedral is the third studio album by indie rock band Clinic. It was released in 2004 via Domino Records.

== Track listing ==
1. "Country Mile" – 3:19
2. "Circle of Fifths" – 3:24
3. "Anne" – 3:35
4. "The Magician" – 2:41
5. "Vertical Take Off in Egypt" – 2:13
6. "Home" – 3:13
7. "W.D.Y.Y.B." – 2:19
8. "The Majestic #2" – 3:09
9. "Falstaff" – 3:35
10. "August" – 2:37
11. "Thank You (For Living)" – 3:15
12. "Fingers" – 3:26

== Singles ==
- "The Magician" (12 July 2004)
- "Circle of Fifths" (22 November 2004)

== Personnel ==
- Ade Blackburn – Keyboard, Melodica, Lead Vocals
- Brian Campbell – Bass, Flute, Backing Vocals
- Hartley – Lead Guitar, Clarinet, Keyboards
- Carl Turney – Drums, Piano, Backing Vocals, Additional Percussion
