= Jake Pelkington =

American basketball player (1916–1982)

Personal information
- Born: January 3, 1916 New York City, New York, U.S.
- Died: May 1, 1982 (aged 66) Fort Wayne, Indiana, U.S.
- Listed height: 6 ft 6 in (1.98 m)
- Listed weight: 220 lb (100 kg)

Career information
- High school: Cathedral Prep (Queens, New York)
- Playing career: 1934–1949
- Position: Power forward / center
- Number: 30, 10

Career history
- 1934–1935: Brooklyn Visitations
- 1935–1936: Kingston Colonials
- 1936–1940: New York Jewels
- 1940–1941: Akron Goodyear Wingfoots
- 1942–1948: Fort Wayne (Zollner) Pistons
- 1948–1949: Baltimore Bullets

Career highlights
- ABL champion (1939); 2× NBL champion (1944, 1945); 3× All-NBL Second Team (1941, 1944, 1945)
- Stats at NBA.com
- Stats at Basketball Reference

John Francis Robert "Jake" Pelkington Jr. (January 3, 1916 – May 1, 1982) was an American professional basketball player in the American Basketball League (ABL), National Basketball League (NBL), and Basketball Association of America (BAA). Pelkington enjoyed success in his career, winning three league championships (one in the ABL, two in the NBL) and was a three-time second-team all-NBL selection. He is 10th all-time in NBL career scoring with 1,949 points.

== BAA career statistics ==
Legend
GP	Games played	FG%	Field-goal percentage
FT%	Free-throw percentage	APG	Assists per game
PPG	Points per game	**Bold**	Career high

=== Regular season ===
Year	Team	GP	FG%	FT%	APG	PPG
1948–49	Fort Wayne	14	.317	.773	2.3	8.9
1948–49	Baltimore	**40**	**.438**	**.797**	**2.5**	**11.8**
Career		54	.412	.790	2.4	11.1

=== Playoffs ===
Year	Team	GP	FG%	FT%	APG	PPG
1949	Baltimore	3	.394	.771	1.0	17.7
Career		3	.394	.771	1.0	17.7
