= Atlantic City Sandpipers =

The Atlantic City Sandpipers were an American basketball team based in Atlantic City, New Jersey that was a member of the American Basketball League.

The team did not complete the first half of their only season, dropping out on December 21, 1936.

The team is likely related to the Atlantic City Sand Snipers of the Eastern Basketball League.

== Year-by-year ==
Year	League	Reg. season	Playoffs
1936/37	ABL	6th (1st half)	N/A
