= Paterson Visitations =

Basketball team

The Paterson Visitations (also known as the Triangles) were an American basketball team based in Paterson, New Jersey that was a member of the American Basketball League.

Before the 1936–1937 season the Brooklyn Visitations moved to Paterson and became the Paterson Visitations. During the first half of the 1936–1937 season, the team moved back to Brooklyn on November 21, 1936 and became the Brooklyn Visitations again.

== Year-by-year ==
Year	League	Reg. season	Playoffs
1936/37	ABL	N/A	N/A
