= New York Jewels =

The New York Jewels were an American basketball team based in New York, New York that was a member of the American Basketball League.

The team was previously known as the Brooklyn Jewels. For the 2nd half of the 1936/37, the team was renamed the Brooklyn Jewels. Before the 1937/38 season, the Brooklyn Jewels became the New Haven Jewels. During the 1st half of that season, the team moved back to New York on November 30, 1937. During the 1940/41 season, the team absorbed the Jersey Reds on January 26, 1940. The team dropped out during the 1st half of the 1941/42 season in January 1942 (to the point where they (supposedly) even briefly competed under their original Brooklyn Jewels name at one point), but returned to the ABL as the New York Jewels properly for the next season afterward.

== Year-by-year ==
Year	League	Reg. season	Playoffs
1934/35	ABL	1st (1st half); 5th (2nd half)	Finals
1935/36	ABL	2nd (1st half); 3rd (2nd half)	Did not qualify
1936/37	ABL	4th (1st half)	N/A
1937/38	ABL	2nd (1st half); 1st (2nd half)	Finals
1938/39	ABL	4th	Champion
1939/40	ABL	4th	3rd in Round Robin
1940/41	ABL	4th (1st half); 2nd (2nd half)	Did not qualify
1941/42	ABL	5th (1st half)	N/A
1942/43	ABL	5th	Did not qualify
