= Philadelphia Sphas =

Former American basketball team composed largely of Jewish players

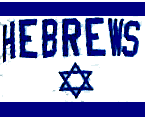
- Conference: American League of Philadelphia (1917–1922); Manufacturer's League (1922–1923); Philadelphia League (1922–1925); Eastern League (1925–1926); American Basketball League (1926–1927, as Warriors); Independent (1928–1929); Eastern Basketball League (1929–1933); American Basketball League (1933–1949, as Sphas)
- Founded: 1917 (as Philadelphia YMHA)
- Folded: December 31, 1959
- History: Philadelphia YMHA (1917), Philadelphia Sphas (1918–1921, 1922–1926, 1927–1933, 1937–1959), Philadelphia Passon, Gottlieb, Black (1921–1923 in American League of Philadelphia and Manufacturer's League), Philadelphia Warriors (1926–1928 in the American Basketball League), Philadelphia Hebrews (1933–1937), Atlantic City Tides (1948–1949)
- Arena: Broadwood Hotel (after 1933)
- Location: Philadelphia, Pennsylvania
- Team colors: Red, white, blue
- General manager: Eddie Gottlieb
- Head coach: Eddie Gottlieb (1917–1946); Harry Litwack
- Championships: 12 (1 in Philadelphia League, 1 in Philadelphia Basket Ball League, 3 in EBL, 7 in ABL)

The Philadelphia Sphas, also stylized SPHAs or SPHAS (literal Jewish translation used for their jerseys during some of their seasons: ספהא (Hebrew alphabet: Samekh, Pe, He, Aleph)), were an American basketball franchise that existed as a professional, semi-professional, and exhibition team. For the majority of their existence, they played their home games in the ballroom of Philadelphia's Broadwood Hotel. The team's name is an acronym, derived from South Philadelphia Hebrew Association (the group that initially funded the team), and the team's players, at least in its earlier years, were primarily Jewish. Future Philadelphia Warriors owner Eddie Gottlieb founded the team as an amateur group shortly after he and some close friends of his (namely Harry Passon and Edwin "Hughie" Black) graduated from high school, and it later became a professional team after years of hard work on their end. The Sphas played in many leagues around both the Philadelphia area and within the East Coast, most notably within the Eastern Basketball League and the American Basketball League (ABL), between which the Sphas won 10 championships. The Sphas won a total of 12 championships, their first two coming from the early Philadelphia League and Philadelphia Basket Ball League.

== History ==
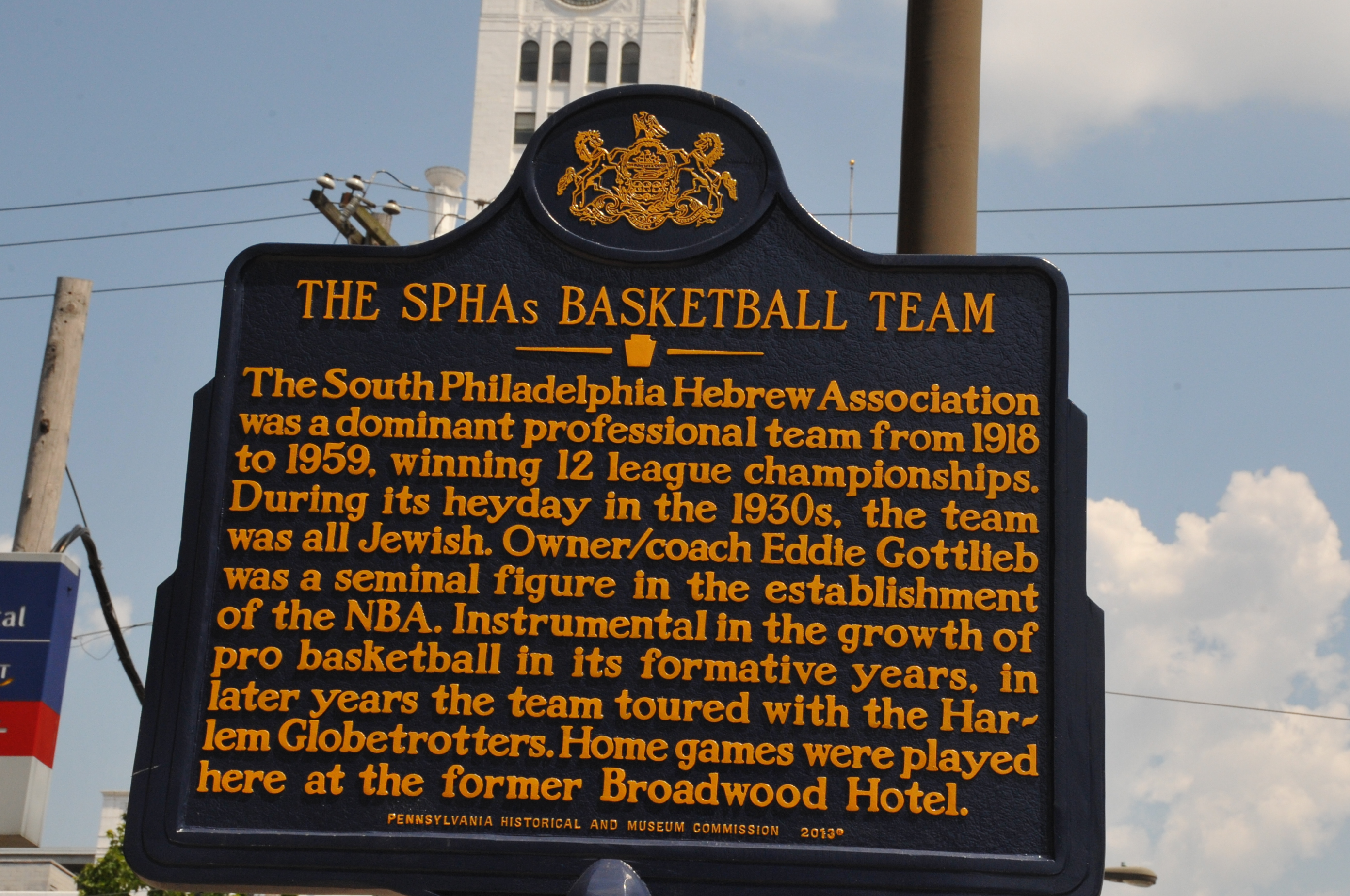
Pennsylvania Historical and Museum Commission marker.

=== Origins as YMHA ===
The Sphas' existence began in 1917 as an amateur team by neighborhood friends Eddie Gottlieb, Harry Passon, and Edwin "Hughie" Black, who all wanted to keep their South Philadelphia High School championship team together. The team first tried to play at the South Philadelphia Hebrew Association social club at Fourth and Reed Streets but were discouraged by the $10-annual-due, which none of the players from immigrant Jewish families could afford. The players offered to put on games for the Association in exchange for membership. The first games were played at a church hall at Sixth and Reed Streets. Attendance soared and the team moved to the Philadelphia Athletic Club at Broad and Wood Streets. Saturday night games would be followed by a dance with a live band.

The team's first season took place in the American League of Philadelphia, a minor league that comprised six area teams. They were sponsored by the Young Men's Hebrew Association of South Philadelphia and were called Philadelphia YMHA for that season. The team turned in a 4–11 record, tied for last in the league that year. After this season, each YMHA withdrew its support for the team, citing dissatisfaction with the game's violent nature.

=== Change to Sphas and "Wandering Jews" period ===
After losing their sponsorship from the YMHA, Gottlieb, Passon, and Black approached the South Philadelphia Hebrew Association about sponsoring the team. The association agreed to sponsor the men and provided funding for uniforms to the team. The new uniforms featured the acronym SPHA in Hebrew (ספהא) across the front. Again, their sponsorial relationship was short-lived, as the SPHA withdrew their sponsorship shortly after for an unspecified reason. The men had better financial solvency this time around, as they opened a sporting goods store, calling it P.G.B. Sporting Goods. With the store, they created new uniforms, but kept the Sphas moniker as a way of paying tribute to their upbringing. Douglas Stark, author of The SPHAS: The Life and Times of Basketball's Greatest Jewish Team, noted that "[f]or a number of years, the team was known as the Wandering Jews, because the team did not have its own home court."

The team continued to play in the American League of Philadelphia after losing their partnership with the SPHA, and played in two different leagues during 1922–23 season: The Manufacturer's League, containing teams from area companies, and the Philadelphia League, which consisted of teams from the greater Philadelphia area, a number of them religious. In their single season in the Manufacturer's League, the team (known as Philadelphia Passon, Gottlieb, Black since they competed through Passon and Black's sporting goods store) turned in an overall 8–6 record, finishing 3rd in the first half of that season and 6th (out of 8) in the second half. Their first season in the Philadelphia League was a disappointing one, turning in an 8–11 record and finishing 2nd in the first half of the season, but last in the second half at 1–8. The Sphas' next season in the Philadelphia League would prove more fruitful (due in part to the increased number of games), as the Sphas turned in a 25–15 record, overcoming a first-half slump of 14–13 (5th out of 8) to finish first in the second half of the season with an 11–3 record. They went on that year to defeat the Tri-Council Caseys 2–0 for their first championship.

=== Early championships, success against barnstorming teams, first ABL stint and name change ===
For the 1924–25 season, the Philadelphia League reconstituted itself as the Philadelphia Basket Ball League, dropping the number of teams in the league to six. The Sphas continued a strong spate of play, finishing 1st in the first half of the season, and third in the second half. They would go on to be repeat champions that season, winning 2–1 again over Tri-Council. Due to the success of the Sphas against teams in the Philadelphia area, and frustration with playing in the "poorly managed" Eastern League in 1924–25, owner Eddie Gottlieb set up games against professional teams from the newly-formed American Basketball League. The Sphas played a six-game stretch against the Brooklyn Arcadians, Fort Wayne Caseys, Cleveland Rosenblums, Washington Palace Five, and a team from New York's Metropolitan League, the Paterson Legionaires. The Sphas won five out of six games in this series, and Gottlieb subsequently scheduled games against two top barnstorming teams of the day, the Original Celtics and New York Renaissance. The Sphas defeated the Original Celtics 2–1 and swept the Rens, 2–0. The team's victories over these top barnstorming teams gave them increased notability in the burgeoning professional basketball community. Riding the wave of victories his team achieved against the ABL and barnstorming teams, Gottlieb entered the Sphas in the ABL, rechristening them the Philadelphia Warriors. During their two years in the ABL as the Warriors, the team performed moderately well, finishing third (14–7) and then fourth (10–11) in the 1926–27 season. For the 1927–28 season, the ABL split into two divisions (Eastern and Western). The Warriors played in the Eastern Division and finished third with a 30–21 record. This allowed them entry into the playoffs, where they lost to the New York Celtics 2–0.

=== Later years ===
With the 1946 advent of the Basketball Association of America, the immediate predecessor of the NBA after the BAA merged with the rivaling National Basketball League by 1949, the ABL would devolve its services into a minor-league by 1947, with the Sphas remaining there as a semi-professional team up until 1949. Abe Radel would be considered the new primary owner of the Sphas, while Harry Litwack was considered the new head coach of the Sphas during their final seasons in the ABL, with the change occurring due to Eddie Gottlieb putting the majority of his attention on the newly-created Philadelphia Warriors (not related to the team from the 1920s outside of name only) in the newly-created Basketball Association of America (with him especially being notable for being the only representative of the BAA's original eleven teams to even know anything properly about basketball at all during the BAA's original meetings). 1949 would be the last year the Sphas were affiliated with a league, though thanks to Gottlieb's friendship with Abe Saperstein, president and owner of the Harlem Globetrotters, the Sphas still lived on as one of the exhibition teams that the Globetrotters would play, although they would retain only the franchise name by that point in time; they would not utilize the original Jewish makeup of the team once they became a more permanent affiliate with the Globetrotters branding.

Despite popular wisdom, the Sphas did not directly evolve into the Washington Generals. Instead, Saperstein had asked Red Klotz to create a separate exhibition team because the Sphas had beaten the Globetrotters on more than one occasion. After creating the Generals, Klotz sold the Sphas to one of his players, Pete Monska, who coached the team "for a year or two until it disbanded [in October 1959.]" The Sphas played their last game as the original team on October 17, 1959, losing 68–42 to the Globetrotters in a double-header exhibition game. The Sphas were then reconstituted as the Baltimore Rockets, who themselves were another Globetrotters exhibition team during that time. The Baltimore Rockets alongside the Boston Shamrocks, New Jersey Reds, and Atlantic City Seagulls would later end up being absorbed into the Washington Generals program by 1971, with each of those four teams competing under those respective names for the 1971–72 season of play before all of them eventually became a part of the Washington Generals program for the present day, with the Generals only briefly going defunct from 2015–2017 following the death of Red Klotz.
