= List of Philadelphia Sphas seasons =

List of basketball seasons for the Philadelphia Sphas

The Philadelphia Sphas were an American professional basketball team active from 1917 to 1959, with the 1948–49 season in the ABL being their last season of play before they devolved themselves into a regular opponent for the Harlem Globetrotters for the rest of their existence going forward. Throughout the team's tenure, they played in many ramshackle leagues, which was commonplace in the time before the formation of the NBA. Most of the Sphas' existence was spent in the Eastern Basketball League and the American Basketball League. They won twelve championships, one each in the short-lived Philadelphia League and Philadelphia Basket Ball League, three in the Eastern Basketball League, and seven in the American Basketball League. They also can be seen as unofficial champions for their final season of competition in the American League of Philadelphia as well before that league prematurely shut down operations, as well as the unofficial champions of the Eastern League due to the messy way that league went through things from the first half of that season into the second half of that season.

Year	League	Regular season	Playoffs	Ref
1917–18	American League of Philadelphia (as Philadelphia YMHA)	5th (tie for last)	No playoffs were held by the ALP	
1918–19	American League of Philadelphia	5th (1st half); 5th (2nd half), 5th overall	No playoffs were held by the ALP	
1919–20	American League of Philadelphia	3rd (1st half); 4th (2nd half)	No playoffs were held by the ALP	
1920–21	American League of Philadelphia	4th (1st half); 7th (2nd half), 6th overall	No playoffs were held by the ALP	
1921–22	American League of Philadelphia (as Philadelphia Passon, Gottlieb, Black)	1st (1st half); 3rd (2nd half)	ALP folded before the season completed	
1922–23	Manufacturer's League (as Philadelphia Passon, Gottlieb, Black)	3rd (1st half); 6th (2nd half)	No playoffs were held by the Manufacturer's League	
1922–23	Philadelphia League	2nd (1st half); 6th (2nd half)	Did not qualify	
1923–24	Philadelphia League	5th (1st half); 1st (2nd half)	Champions (2–0 over Tri-Council Caseys)	
1924–25	Philadelphia Basket Ball League	1st (1st half); 3rd (2nd half)	Champions (2–1 over Tri-Council Caseys)	
1925–26	Eastern League	3rd (1st half); 1st (2nd half)	No playoffs were held by the Eastern League	
1926–27	American Basketball League (as Warriors)	2nd (2nd half)	Did not qualify	
1927–28	American Basketball League (as Warriors)	2nd	Lost semifinal round (2–0 to New York (Original) Celtics)	
1928–29	Philadelphia Basket Ball League	5th (1st half)	Sphas dropped out of the league after the first half	
1928–29	The team was not part of any league and played independently			
1929–30	Eastern Basketball League	2nd (1st half); 1st (2nd half)	Champions (3–2 over Philadelphia Elks)	
1930–31	Eastern Basketball League	1st (1st half); 2nd (2nd half)	Champions (3–1 over Camden Skeeters)	
1931–32	Eastern Basketball League	2nd (1st half, lost 1st half title to Philadelphia Moose); 1st (2nd half)	Champions (3–1 over Philadelphia Moose)	
1932–33	Eastern Basketball League	1st (1st half); 3rd (2nd half)	Lost championship (3–1 to Trenton Moose)	
1933–34	American Basketball League (as Sphas or Hebrews)	3rd (1st half); 1st (2nd half)	Champions (4–2 over Trenton Moose)	
1934–35	American Basketball League (as Sphas or Hebrews)	2nd (1st half); 2nd (2nd half)	Lost second half title (2–1 to Brooklyn Visitations)	
1935–36	American Basketball League (as Sphas or Hebrews)	1st (1st half); 5th (2nd half)	Champions (4–3 over Brooklyn Visitations)	
1936–37	American Basketball League (as Sphas or Hebrews)	2nd (1st half); 1st (2nd half)	Champions (4–3 over Jersey Reds)	
1937–38	American Basketball League	4th (1st half); 3rd (2nd half)	Did not qualify	
1938–39	American Basketball League	2nd	Lost semifinal round (2–0 to New York Jewels)	
1939–40	American Basketball League	1st	Champions (defeated the Washington Heurich Brewers, Troy Celtics, New York Jewels, and Baltimore Clippers in a round-robin tournament championship series)	
1940–41	American Basketball League	1st (1st half); 4th (2nd half)	Champions (3–1 over Brooklyn Celtics)	
1941–42	American Basketball League	2nd (1st half); 3rd (2nd half)	No playoffs were held by the ABL (Wilmington Blue Bombers were the league champions this season.)	
1942–43	American Basketball League	2nd	Champions (4–3 over Trenton Tigers)	
1943–44	American Basketball League	4th (1st half); 1st (2nd half)	Lost championship (4–3 to Wilmington Bombers)	
1944–45	American Basketball League	1st	Champions (2–1 over Baltimore Bullets)	
1945–46	American Basketball League	2nd	Lost championship (3–1 to Baltimore Bullets)	
1946–47	American Basketball League	2nd	Lost semifinal round (2–1 to Trenton Tigers)	
1947–48	American Basketball League	6th	Did not qualify	
1948–49	American Basketball League (originally as the Atlantic City Tides before returning to the Philadelphia Sphas name by January 16, 1949)	8th	Did not qualify	
