= 1935–36 Philadelphia Sphas season =

American basketball team season

1935–36 Philadelphia Sphas / Hebrews season
- League champions
- League: American Basketball League (revived original)
- Head coach: Eddie Gottlieb
- General manager: Eddie Gottlieb
- Owner(s): Eddie Gottlieb
- Arena: Broadwood Hotel

Results
- Record: 23–15 (.605)
- Place: Conference: 1st (1st half), 5th (2nd half)
- Playoff finish: ABL Champions (Won 4–3 over Brooklyn Visitations)

The Philadelphia Sphas were an early, historical example of an American professional basketball team. The 1935–36 season was the third season played in the now-revived American Basketball League by the Sphas, although they did play in the original rendition of the ABL from 1926 to 1928 as the Philadelphia Warriors, which had no relation to the later BAA franchise of the same name that now exists in the present day as the Golden State Warriors in the NBA. As such, when including the past history of the original ABL with the revived version of the ABL in 1933 following historical problems that related to the Great Depression near the end of 1931, this would technically be the ninth official season played by the original ABL properly, though this would officially be the 19th season of play for the Sphas franchise when including previous seasons where they played under names like the "Philadelphia YMHA"; the "Philadelphia Passon, Gottlieb, Black", the "Philadelphia Warriors"; and most recently, the "Philadelphia Hebrews".

== Background ==
The Sphas played in leagues around Philadelphia since 1917, but game-by-game records before the Sphas rejoined the ABL in 1933 are not (currently) available (at least, not to the general public if official game records did exist for the Sphas) and are therefore likely lost to time itself.

After failing to repeat as champions of the revived ABL, the Sphas would enter this season with an attempt to return to championship form once again for this season to make up for their lost presence the previous season following their disappointing tiebreaker loss to the Brooklyn Visitations (led in part by future Hall of Famer Bobby McDermott alongside veteran guards Joseph Brennan and Rody Cooney). In their attempt to return to championship form, the Sphas would already be halfway there with an impressively above-average 14–5 record for first place in the first half of the season, surpassing the second-best team's record of 11–8 by the New York Jewels by three games this time around. While the Sphas had a chance to secure the ABL's championship once again by default had they also secured first place for the second half of the season as well, they would surprisingly perform a lot worse than expected by that half, ending that specific part of the season with a below-average 9–11 record to finish in fifth place ahead of only the rebranded Passaic Red Devils this time around. While their second half of the season would be a lot more disappointing than their first half of the season was, they would have a chance at redemption by having revenge against last season's ABL champions, the Brooklyn Visitations (the winners of the second half of this season with an above-average 12–8 record), for a chance at avenging the second half tiebreaker series they lost the previous season. While the championship series against Brooklyn would go down to the wire due to each team splitting their first six games against each other (with Philadelphia winning the odd-numbered games and Brooklyn winning the even-numbered games), it would be the Sphas that would win the decisive Game 7 with an easy 47–34 beatdown over the Visitations to avenge their previous season's defeat to the Visitations in the second half of that season and be crowned ABL champions once again with a 4–3 series victory. The Sphas were also referred to as the Philadelphia Hebrews in league records during this period of time, with the Hebrews name continuing to be utilized until 1937.

== Roster ==
Due to information on American Basketball League players being generally hard to find, there are bound to be more gaps and/or inaccuracies found in certain areas on the team's roster spots than usual.

1935–36 Philadelphia Sphas / Hebrews roster
Players

Pos.	No.	Player	Height	Weight	DOB	From
G/F		Gil Fitch	6 ft 0 in (1.83 m)	175 lb (79 kg)	1909–12–24	Temple
F/C		Moe Goldman	6 ft 3 in (1.91 m)	175 lb (79 kg)	1913–05–30	CCNY
G/F		Shikey Gotthoffer	6 ft 0 in (1.83 m)	195 lb (88 kg)	1911–01–01	NYU
G		Cy Kaselman	5 ft 10 in (1.78 m)	165 lb (75 kg)	1909–05–01	Temple
F/C		Inky Lautman	6 ft 2 in (1.88 m)	205 lb (93 kg)	1914–05–22	Central HS (PA)
G		Harry Litwack	5 ft 7 in (1.70 m)	170 lb (77 kg)	1907–09–20	Temple
F/C		Red Rosan	6 ft 2 in (1.88 m)	195 lb (88 kg)	1911–05–22	Temple
G		Red Wolfe	5 ft 11 in (1.80 m)	165 lb (75 kg)	1905–07–18	St. John's

Coaches
Head coach
- Eddie Gottlieb

Legend
- (DP) Unsigned draft pick
- (FA) Free agent
- (S) Suspended
- Injured

Note: Harry Litwack would not play for the team during the 1936 ABL Championship series.

== ABL Standings ==
First Half
Team	Wins	Losses	Winning %
Philadelphia SPHAs / Hebrews	14	5	.737
New York Jewels	11	8	.579
Brooklyn Visitations	10	10	.500
Jersey Reds	9	9	.500
Kingston Colonials	7	12	.368
Paterson Panthers / Trenton Bengals^{[a]}	4	11	.267

Second Half
Team	Wins	Losses	Winning %
Brooklyn Visitations	12	8	.600
Jersey Reds	11	9	.550
New York Jewels	10	10	.500
Kingston Colonials	9	10	.474
Philadelphia SPHAs / Hebrews	9	11	.450
Passaic Red Devils^{[a]}	8	11	.421

== ABL Schedule ==
First Half
#	Date	Opponent	Score	Record
1A	November 2	Kingston Colonials	52–36	1–0
2A	November 3	@ Brooklyn Visitations	30–25	2–0
3A	November 9	Passaic Panthers^{[a]}	43–26	3–0
4A	November 16	New York Jewels	29–31	3–1
5A	November 17	@ New York Jewels	24–16	4–1
6A	November 20	@ Kingston Colonials	34–26	5–1
7A	November 23	Brooklyn Visitations	29–25	6–1
8A	November 30	Jersey Reds	41–31	7–1
9A	December 1	@ Brooklyn Visitations	21–25	7–2
10A	December 7	Kingston Colonials	47–37	8–2
11A	December 8	@ Jersey Reds	23–33	8–3
12A	December 14	New York Jewels	28–40	8–4
13A	December 15	@ New York Jewels	29–25	9–4
14A	December 21	Trenton Bengals^{[a]}	41–30	10–4
15A	December 25	@ Trenton Bengals^{[a]}	29–25	11–4
16A	December 28	Brooklyn Visitations	35–33	12–4
17A	January 4	Jersey Reds	37–24	13–4
18A	January 5	@ Jersey Reds	19–31	13–5
19A	January 8	@ Kingston Colonials	37–26	14–5

Second Half
#	Date	Opponent	Score	Record
1B	January 11	Brooklyn Visitations	43–40	1–0
2B	January 12	@ Brooklyn Visitations	33–36	1–1
3B	January 18	Passaic Red Devils^{[a]}	30–25	2–1
4B	January 22	@ Passaic Red Devils^{[a]}	18–30	2–2
5B	January 26 (Game 1)	@ Jersey Reds	41–25	3–2
6B	January 26 (Game 2)	@ New York Jewels	25–28	3–3
7B	January 29	@ Kingston Colonials	34–31	4–3
8B	February 1	New York Jewels	27–35	4–4
9B	February 8	Kingston Colonials	32–36	4–5
10B	February 15	Jersey Reds	31–33	4–6
11B	February 16	@ Brooklyn Visitations	21–33	4–7
12B	February 22	Brooklyn Visitations	29–44	4–8
13B	February 23	@ New York Jewels	27–20	5–8
14B	February 26	@ Passaic Red Devils^{[a]}	41–45	5–9
15B	February 29	Passaic Red Devils^{[a]}	42–27	6–9
16B	March 7	Kingston Colonials	40–18	7–9
17B	March 11	@ Kingston Colonials	19–25	7–10
18B	March 14	New York Jewels	28–33	7–11
19B	March 15	@ Jersey Reds	25–24	8–11
20B	March 21	Jersey Reds	28–21	9–11

ABL Championship Series
Game	Date	Opponent	Score	Record
Game 1	March 28	Brooklyn Visitations	30–28	1–0
Game 2	March 29	@ Brooklyn Visitations	24–27	1–1
Game 3	April 4	Brooklyn Visitations	30–27	2–1
Game 4	April 5	@ Brooklyn Visitations	24–31	2–2
Game 5	April 11	Brooklyn Visitations	26–23	3–2
Game 6	April 12	@ Brooklyn Visitations	30–31	3–3
Game 7	April 13	Brooklyn Visitations	47–34	4–3

== Notes ==
^{a} During the first half of the season, after losing all five of the games they played this season, the Paterson Panthers would move from Paterson, New Jersey to nearby Trenton, New Jersey on December 12, 1935 to become the newer version of the Trenton Bengals for the rest of the season. Trenton would finish the first half of the season with a 4–6 record for an overall record of 4–11 between the two teams before the Trenton squad moved out to nearby Passaic, New Jersey on December 30, 1935 to play as the Passaic Red Devils by the time the second half of the season began.
