= 1942–43 Philadelphia Sphas season =

American basketball team season

- League champions
- League: American Basketball League (revived original)
- Head coach: Eddie Gottlieb
- General manager: Eddie Gottlieb
- Owner(s): Eddie Gottlieb
- Arena: Broadwood Hotel

Results
- Record: 9–6 (.600)
- Place: Conference: 2nd
- Playoff finish: ABL Champions (Won 4–3 over Trenton Tigers)

The Philadelphia Sphas were an early, historical example of an American professional basketball team. The 1942–43 season was the tenth season played in the now-revived American Basketball League by the Sphas, although they did play in the original rendition of the ABL from 1926 to 1928 as the Philadelphia Warriors, which had no relation to the later BAA franchise of the same name that now exists in the present day as the Golden State Warriors in the NBA. As such, when including the past history of the original ABL with the revived version of the ABL in 1933 following historical problems that related to the Great Depression near the end of 1931, this would technically be the sixteenth official season played by the original ABL properly, though this would officially be the 26th season of play for the Sphas franchise when including previous seasons where they played under names like the "Philadelphia YMHA"; the "Philadelphia Passon, Gottlieb, Black", the "Philadelphia Warriors"; and the "Philadelphia Hebrews".

== Background ==
The Sphas played in leagues around Philadelphia since 1917, but game-by-game records before the Sphas rejoined the ABL in 1933 are not (currently) available (at least, not to the general public if official game records did exist for the Sphas) and are therefore likely lost to time itself. Following the previous season's failure in regards to the ABL not having a championship series occur due to the Wilmington Blue Bombers automatically being declared champions of the league by default thanks to them winning both halves of the regular season, the ABL would decide to go back to using the full regular season formatting that the rivaling National Basketball League has done throughout their history alongside what the ABL had previously done in the 1938–39 and 1939–40 seasons (though unlike the NBL for this season, the ABL decided to have its playoffs essentially just be a best-of-seven championship series between the two best teams of the league due to them only having five competing teams at hand throughout this season). Not only that, but due to the trying times of the World War II period at hand, the ABL would agree to terms with both the rivaling NBL and the minor basketball league known as the Connecticut State Basketball League to prohibit the transfer of players between their leagues without due compensation in order to minimize the effects of many players joining the war effort during this period of time. While the ABL had considered shutting down operations during this season similar to what the rivaling NBL had considered doing themselves during its offseason period, its continued operation during this period of time was encouraged by the federal government as a means of boosting morale at home.

Due to the combination of the low amount of competitive teams within the ABL this season and the wartime limitations set within the U.S.A. during this period of time (notably the Office of Defense Transportation banning pleasure driving in 1943 in order to minimize civilian gasoline consumption, which made traveling for certain teams challenging during their seasons), the ABL was given its shortest set schedule of games in league history, with the Sphas themselves only being able to play in fifteen total games this season (which, weirdly enough, was the most games played out of any team in the ABL this season, likely due to the Sphas' own extensive history of being a traveling franchise that had once been considered a barnstorming team alongside their own prior history of various competitive sports leagues they had taken a part in throughout their years of existence). Nevertheless, with the Sphas trying to reclaim their spot as champions once again in the ABL (while also holding that title for the sixth time in ten overall seasons in the league's history of existence as a revived professional basketball league), the Sphas would end up having an above-average 9–6 record throughout the 15 games they played within the ABL's scheduled games played this season (which included giving the New York Jewels their only victory within the season). While it was a pretty good record, it was only good enough for second place due to them being behind the much better Trenton Tigers, who had an incredibly high 11–2 record in the thirteen games they played for their first place finish (though the Sphas were also the only team to beat the Tigers at all within the ABL this season, weirdly enough). Regardless, while the past season would have had Trenton winning the season outright by default, the ABL's shortened out playoff format for a simple best-of-seven championship series between the two best teams of the league would have the Tigers and the Sphas competing against each other to see who the better team truly was this season, with Philadelphia looking to win it all once again in Trenton, New Jersey after they had previously defeated the Trenton Moose for their inaugural ABL championship in 1934. Initially, the Tigers and Sphas traded games back and forth with each other, similar to how the Sphas traded games back and forth with the Brooklyn Visitations in the 1936 ABL Championship Series, but unlike with the 1936 series where the odd-numbered team for the series won every game outright, it would be Philadelphia (who had won the even-numbered games this time around) that would win Game 7 with a close 44–42 victory to steal the 1943 ABL Championship Series away from Trenton once again (this time from the Tigers franchise) to have the Sphas be named the ABL's champions once again for the sixth time in ten straight seasons in the revived ABL.

== Roster ==
Due to information on American Basketball League players being generally hard to find, there are bound to be more gaps and/or inaccuracies found in certain areas on the team's roster spots than usual.

1942–43 Philadelphia Sphas roster
Players

Pos.	No.	Player	Height	Weight	DOB	From
F/C		Irv Davis	6 ft 2 in (1.88 m)	195 lb (88 kg)	1915–01–10	NYU
F		Ben Goldfaden	6 ft 1 in (1.85 m)	185 lb (84 kg)	1913–09–06	George Washington
G/F		Shikey Gotthoffer	6 ft 0 in (1.83 m)	195 lb (88 kg)	1911–01–01	NYU
G		Red Klotz	5 ft 7 in (1.70 m)	150 lb (68 kg)	1920–10–21	Villanova
F/C		Inky Lautman	6 ft 2 in (1.88 m)	205 lb (93 kg)	1914–05–22	Central HS (PA)
G		Chink Morganstine	6 ft 0 in (1.83 m)	200 lb (91 kg)	1918–05–09	Temple
F		Dutch Newman	6 ft 2 in (1.88 m)	180 lb (82 kg)	1917–04–18	Long Island
F/C		Red Rosan	6 ft 2 in (1.88 m)	195 lb (88 kg)	1911–05–22	Temple
G		Petey Rosenberg	5 ft 10 in (1.78 m)	165 lb (75 kg)	1918–04–07	Saint Joseph's
G/F		Ossie Schectman	6 ft 0 in (1.83 m)	175 lb (79 kg)	1919–03–30	Long Island
G/F		Butch Schwartz	6 ft 2 in (1.88 m)	190 lb (86 kg)	1919–02–14	Long Island
F		Irv Torgoff	6 ft 2 in (1.88 m)	192 lb (87 kg)	1917–03–06	Long Island
G		Red Wolfe	5 ft 11 in (1.80 m)	165 lb (75 kg)	1905–07–18	St. John's

Coaches
Head coach
- Eddie Gottlieb

Legend
- (DP) Unsigned draft pick
- (FA) Free agent
- (S) Suspended
- Injured

Note: Shikey Gotthoffer, Dutch Newman, Petey Rosenberg, and Ossie Schectman would not compete in the 1943 ABL Championship Series.

== ABL Standings ==
Pos.	League Standings	Wins	Losses	Win %
1	Trenton Tigers	11	2	.846
2	Philadelphia SPHAs	9	6	.600
3	Camden Indians / Brooklyn Indians^{[a]}	3	5	.375
4	Harrisburg Senators	4	8	.333
5	New York Jewels	1	7	.125

== ABL Schedule ==
This season would mark the third time in four straight seasons within the revived version of the ABL's history that the ABL would have a regular, full regular season instead of two half seasons merged together into one whole season of play. However, due to the number of teams competing in the league this season, the ABL decided to have its playoff format for this season only utilize the two best teams competing against each other in a best-of-seven championship series instead of a regular playoff format involving a semifinal round and a championship round similar to what the rivaling National Basketball League would be doing this season or even utilizing a round-robin tournament like they ABL had done in a previous season of theirs.

=== ABL Regular Season ===
#	Date	Opponent	Score	Record
1	December 19	Harrisburg Senators	40–36	1–0
2	December 25	@ Trenton Tigers	34–40	1–1
3	December 26	New York Jewels	50–45	2–1
4	January 1	@ Harrisburg Senators	36–44	2–2
5	January 2	Camden Indians^{[a]}	35–48	2–3
6	January 9	Trenton Tigers	40–37	3–3
7	January 22	@ New York Jewels	38–37	4–3
8	January 23	New York Jewels	42–29	5–3
9	January 30	Harrisburg Senators	32–33	5–4
10	February 4	@ Harrisburg Senators	45–38	6–4
11	February 6	Brooklyn Indians^{[a]}	43–39	7–4
12	February 13	Trenton Tigers	34–50	7–5
13	February 20	New York Jewels	32–37	7–6
14	February 21	@ Trenton Tigers	36–25	8–6
15	February 27	Brooklyn Indians^{[a]}	43–34	9–6

=== ABL Championship Series ===
Game	Date	Opponent	Score	Record
Game 1	March 6	Trenton Tigers	27–36	0–1
Game 2	March 7	@ Trenton Tigers	42–35	1–1
Game 3	March 13	Trenton Tigers	30–37	1–2
Game 4	March 14	@ Trenton Tigers	42–39	2–2
Game 5	March 27	Trenton Tigers	38–48	2–3
Game 6	March 28	@ Trenton Tigers	34–33	3–3
Game 7	April 3	Trenton Tigers	44–42	4–3

The delay in-between Games 4 and 5 in this championship series between the Philadelphia Sphas and the Trenton Tigers involved team owners Eddie Gottlieb and Girard Naples agreeing to delay the series for almost two weeks due to both teams needing to rest up several of their key players that were affected by injuries at the time.

== Notes ==
^{a} The Camden Indians moved from Camden, New Jersey to nearby Brooklyn, New York on January 18, 1943.
