= 1932–33 Philadelphia Sphas season =

American basketball team season

- League: Eastern Basketball League
- Head coach: Eddie Gottlieb
- General manager: Eddie Gottlieb
- Owner(s): Eddie Gottlieb; Harry Passon; Edwin "Hughie" Black
- Arena: Broadwood Hotel

Results
- Record: 20–13 (.606)
- Place: Conference: 1st (first half), 3rd (second half)
- Playoff finish: Lost Eastern Basketball League championship 3-1 to the Trenton Moose

The 1932–33 season was the fourth and final season of play for the Philadelphia Sphas while operating in the Eastern Basketball League (not to be confused with the Eastern League that the Sphas previously played in a few seasons ago, although some outlets would call this league the Eastern States Basketball League instead during this season and its previous season), though it would officially be their fourteenth season of play when including previous seasons they were operating in some different leagues as different team names by comparison to their final Sphas name. Entering this season, the Sphas looked to have an unprecedented four-time repeat for the Eastern Basketball League championship after previously winning three straight best-of-five championships between a close 3-2 series against the Philadelphia Elks, a 3-1 series win against the Camden Skeeters, and another close 3-2 victory, this time against the Philadelphia Moose instead of the Philadelphia Elks. However, this last season of theirs in the Eastern Basketball League would prove to be the franchise's worst with the Sphas only having 20 total victories in 33 games played, but also finishing one of their half-seasons with a third place finish instead of a second place or even a first place finish, which would foreshadow how things would go for their final championship series in that league. With that being said, game-by-game records are (currently) not available for this season and are therefore likely lost to time in the process (with this season being the final season for the Sphas to not have proper game-by-game records being shown).

For the first half of this more unstable than usual season, the Sphas would end that half of the season with a 12–6 record, which saw them have a shot at winning the league's championship by default if they finish the second half of the season with a first place finish as well. Unfortunately for the Sphas, the second half of the season would end up being their worst half of their entire existence within the Eastern Basketball League, as they would finish that half with a barely above-average 8–7 record, which was good enough for only third place behind both the Philadelphia Moose and the first place Trenton Moose franchises (with the Trenton squad nearly going undefeated during that particular half of the season with a 14–1 record). As such, the Sphas would end up having to compete against the newly-established Trenton Moose franchise in order to get their fourth straight championship within the Eastern Basketball League. Unfortunately for the Sphas, the inverse of their second championship series in the EBL would take effect against the Trenton Moose squad, as the Sphas would defeat the Trenton squad with a close 30–27 victory, but end up losing their next three games soon afterward to lose what would become their final championship series in the now-major league Eastern Basketball League to the Trenton Moose. Following this season's conclusion, both the Philadelphia Sphas and the Trenton Moose would end up leaving the Eastern Basketball League for join what would be a revived attempt at the larger original American Basketball League professional basketball league (albeit under a somewhat smaller scale when compared to the ABL's original run that the Sphas had played in back when they went by the Philadelphia Warriors), which the Sphas would stay in for most of the rest of their existence going forward.

== Roster ==
Due to information on older (professional) basketball leagues being generally hard (if not outright impossible these days) to find for players from leagues like the Eastern Basketball League, there are bound to be more gaps and/or inaccuracies found in certain areas on the team's roster spots than usual.

1932–33 Philadelphia Sphas roster
Players

Pos.	No.	Player	Height	Weight	DOB	From
G/F		Gil Fitch	6 ft 0 in (1.83 m)	175 lb (79 kg)	1909–12–24	Temple
F/C		Lou Forman	6 ft 2 in (1.88 m)	160 lb (73 kg)	1906–08–05	Dickinson
G		Cy Kaselman	5 ft 10 in (1.78 m)	165 lb (75 kg)	1909–05–01	Temple
G		Izzy Leff	6 ft 0 in (1.83 m)	170 lb (77 kg)	1907–11–04	Temple
G		Harry Litwack	5 ft 7 in (1.70 m)	170 lb (77 kg)	1907–09–20	Temple
G		Chickie Passon	5 ft 7 in (1.70 m)	165 lb (75 kg)	1900–05–30	Penn
G		Mac Posnack	5 ft 11 in (1.80 m)	195 lb (88 kg)	1909–06–23	St. John's
G		Red Wolfe	5 ft 11 in (1.80 m)	165 lb (75 kg)	1905–07–18	St. John's

Coaches
Head coach
- Eddie Gottlieb

Legend
- (DP) Unsigned draft pick
- (FA) Free agent
- (S) Suspended
- Injured

Note: Izzy Leff would not be a part of the team's championship series roster for this season for some unknown reason.

== Eastern Basketball League Standings ==
First Half
Team	Wins	Losses	Winning %
Philadelphia SPHAs	12	6	.667
Trenton Moose	10	7	.588
Philadelphia Moose	9	7	.563
Bridgeton Gems	10	8	.556
Philadelphia Jasper Jewels	7	10	.412
Wilmington Cats / Philadelphia WPEN A.C. Broadcasters*	3	13	.188

* – The Wilmington Cats would drop out of the league during the first half of the season, with the Philadelphia WPEN A.C. Broadcasters (whose team's creation was essentially involving players working at the local WPEN radio broadcasting company at the time) taking on Wilmington's spot for the rest of the season.

Second Half
Team	Wins	Losses	Winning %
Trenton Moose	14	1	.933
Philadelphia Moose	10	4	.714
Philadelphia SPHAs	8	7	.533
Bridgeton Gems	5	5	.500
Philadelphia Jasper Jewels	3	10	.231
Philadelphia WPEN A.C. Broadcasters	1	14	.067

== Eastern Basketball League Championship Series ==
Philadelphia Sphas (1st Half Champions) Vs. Trenton Moose (2nd Half Champions): Trenton Moose win series 3–1.

- Game 1 @ Philadelphia: The Philadelphia Sphas defeated the Trenton Moose 30–27.
- Game 2 @ Trenton: The Trenton Moose defeated the Philadelphia Sphas 25–28.
- Game 3 @ Philadelphia: The Trenton Moose defeated the Philadelphia Sphas 29–34.
- Game 4 @ Trenton: The Trenton Moose defeated the Philadelphia Sphas 28–34.
