= 1941–42 Philadelphia Sphas season =

American basketball team season

- League: American Basketball League (revived original)
- Head coach: Eddie Gottlieb
- General manager: Eddie Gottlieb
- Owner(s): Eddie Gottlieb
- Arena: Broadwood Hotel

Results
- Record: 13–13 (.500)
- Place: Conference: 2nd (1st half), T-3rd (2nd half)
- Playoff finish: Did not qualify (Wilmington Blue Bombers won the ABL's championship by default due to them being the best team in both halves of the ABL's season.)

The Philadelphia Sphas were an early, historical example of an American professional basketball team. The 1941–42 season was the ninth season played in the now-revived American Basketball League by the Sphas, although they did play in the original rendition of the ABL from 1926 to 1928 as the Philadelphia Warriors, which had no relation to the later BAA franchise of the same name that now exists in the present day as the Golden State Warriors in the NBA. As such, when including the past history of the original ABL with the revived version of the ABL in 1933 following historical problems that related to the Great Depression near the end of 1931, this would technically be the fifteenth official season played by the original ABL properly, though this would officially be the 25th season of play for the Sphas franchise when including previous seasons where they played under names like the "Philadelphia YMHA"; the "Philadelphia Passon, Gottlieb, Black", the "Philadelphia Warriors"; and the "Philadelphia Hebrews".

== Background ==
The Sphas played in leagues around Philadelphia since 1917, but game-by-game records before the Sphas rejoined the ABL in 1933 are not (currently) available (at least, not to the general public if official game records did exist for the Sphas) and are therefore likely lost to time itself. For the second straight season in a row, the ABL decided to utilize its original format of having two half-seasons of play before the champion would be determined by a championship series of sorts, if it was considered to be necessary by the end of the season. However, information on whether the championship series involved for this season would have been a best-of-three series, a best-of-five series, or a best-of-seven series would ultimately be unknown to the general public (and is likely forever lost to time) due to how this season played out this time around.

When trying to become three-time champions of the ABL and six time champions in nine straight seasons of existence within the revived ABL's history, the Sphas would finish the first half of their season with a slightly above-average 8–6 record that put them in second place for that half of the season behind the Wilmington Blue Bombers by a few games. Interestingly, one of the games the Sphas played during the first half of the season would be on the road against the New York Jewels on December 7, 1941 (with the Sphas having a close 38–37 victory over the Jewels that day), which was also the same day the Attack on Pearl Harbor occurred, which later led to the U.S.A. entering World War II themselves. That same first half of the season would also end with the New York Jewels dropping out of the league on a temporary basis for what would only end up amounting to be for the second half of this season, thus leaving the ABL with only four surviving teams by the start of the second half of the season right when World War II was starting to heat up within the nation. While the Sphas would try and get back on track to compete in time for the second half of the season, the Sphas would not have the right mentality to compete for winning in the second half of the season, as they would tie the Washington Brewers for a last place finish (in this case, being third place together) with a below-average 5–7 record that was one game behind the Trenton Tigers for second place and multiple games behind the Wilmington Blue Bombers for first place that half. Normally, in the ABL's half-season format, the two best teams would compete against each other in a championship series to determine the best overall team in the league there. However, because the Wilmington Blue Bombers were far and away the best team in the league in both halves of the season, this became the first and only season in ABL history where the ABL's champion was already determined due to the final regular season record outright based on the results of the two half-seasons on display. Alas, this would be the only season where the Wilmington Blue Bombers would compete under that name, meaning the Sphas wouldn't get any proper revenge upon them in their existence; following this season's conclusion, the franchise would move from Wilmington, Delaware to Camden, New Jersey to become the Camden Indians (though they later finished that season while playing as the Brooklyn Indians due to them later moving to Brooklyn, New York), while the Wilmington franchise later got revived the season after that under the newer Wilmington Bombers name, though the Sphas sadly wouldn't beat them in a proper championship playoff series setting either.

== Roster ==
Due to information on American Basketball League players being generally hard to find, there are bound to be more gaps and/or inaccuracies found in certain areas on the team's roster spots than usual.

1941–42 Philadelphia Sphas roster
Players

Pos.	No.	Player	Height	Weight	DOB	From
G		Billy Beckett	5 ft 7 in (1.70 m)	130 lb (59 kg)	1917–10–26	Unknown
F/C		Irv Davis	6 ft 2 in (1.88 m)	195 lb (88 kg)	1915–01–10	NYU
F/C		Moe Goldman	6 ft 3 in (1.91 m)	175 lb (79 kg)	1913–05–30	CCNY
G/F		Shikey Gotthoffer	6 ft 0 in (1.83 m)	195 lb (88 kg)	1911–01–01	NYU
G		Eddie Gottlieb	5 ft 7 in (1.70 m)	165 lb (75 kg)	1898–09–15	Pennsylvania School of Pedagogy
G		Cy Kaselman	5 ft 10 in (1.78 m)	165 lb (75 kg)	1909–05–01	Temple
F/C		Inky Lautman	6 ft 2 in (1.88 m)	205 lb (93 kg)	1914–05–22	Central HS (PA)
G		Chink Morganstine	6 ft 0 in (1.83 m)	200 lb (91 kg)	1918–05–09	Temple
F		Charlie Mosicant	6 ft 2 in (1.88 m)	205 lb (93 kg)	1912–02–20	La Salle
F		Dutch Newman	6 ft 2 in (1.88 m)	180 lb (82 kg)	1917–04–18	Long Island
F		Harry Platt	6 ft 3 in (1.91 m)	205 lb (93 kg)	1918–01–03	Brown
G		Moe Rappaport			1920?	Unknown
F/C		Red Rosan	6 ft 2 in (1.88 m)	195 lb (88 kg)	1911–05–22	Temple
G		Petey Rosenberg	5 ft 10 in (1.78 m)	165 lb (75 kg)	1918–04–07	Saint Joseph's
G/F		Ossie Schectman	6 ft 0 in (1.83 m)	175 lb (79 kg)	1919–03–30	Long Island
G/F		Butch Schwartz	6 ft 2 in (1.88 m)	190 lb (86 kg)	1919–02–14	Long Island
F		Irv Torgoff	6 ft 2 in (1.88 m)	192 lb (87 kg)	1917–03–06	Long Island
G/F		Ed Trubin	6 ft 2 in (1.88 m)	200 lb (91 kg)	1920–09–08	Unknown
G		Red Wolfe	5 ft 11 in (1.80 m)	165 lb (75 kg)	1905–07–18	St. John's

Coaches
Head coach
- Eddie Gottlieb

Legend
- (DP) Unsigned draft pick
- (FA) Free agent
- (S) Suspended
- Injured

In addition to all of these players, there was also a guard who had the last name of Cohen that played a game for the Sphas during this season as well.

== ABL Standings ==
First Half
Team	Wins	Losses	Winning %
Wilmington Blue Bombers	10	3	.769
Philadelphia SPHAs	8	6	.571
Washington Brewers	5	6	.455
Trenton Tigers	5	8	.385
New York Jewels^{[a]}	1	6	.143

Second Half
Team	Wins	Losses	Winning %
Wilmington Blue Bombers	8	4	.667
Trenton Tigers	6	6	.500
Philadelphia SPHAs	5	7	.417
Washington Brewers	5	7	.417

== ABL Schedule ==
After the previous two seasons saw the ABL utilizing full regular seasons like the rivaling National Basketball League had done, the American Basketball League went back to utilizing two halves for their whole season once again, with the two best teams looking to compete against each other for the league's championship series once again. However, this season would not have a championship series occur due to one team winning both half-seasons this time around.

First Half
#	Date	Opponent	Score	Record
1A	November 2	New York Jewels^{[a]}	34–32	1–0
2A	December 3	@ Wilmington Blue Bombers	24–40	1–1
3A	December 6	Washington Brewers	39–46 (2OT)	2–1
4A	December 7	@ New York Jewels^{[a]}	38–37	2–2
5A	December 13	Wilmington Blue Bombers	36–48	2–3
6A	December 19	@ Washington Brewers	27–37	2–4
7A	December 26	@ Trenton Tigers	38–35	3–4
8A	December 27	Trenton Tigers	49–42	4–4
9A	January 1	@ Wilmington Blue Bombers	36–55	4–5
10A	January 3	Washington Brewers	46–41 (OT)	5–5
11A	January 10	Wilmington Blue Bombers	27–31	5–6
12A	January 16	@ Trenton Tigers	35–33	6–6
13A	January 17	Trenton Tigers	44–31	7–6
14A	January 18	@ Washington Brewers	40–32	8–6

Second Half
#	Date	Opponent	Score	Record
1B	January 30	@ Trenton Tigers	29–26	1–0
2B	January 31	Wilmington Blue Bombers	33–43	1–1
3B	February 5	@ Wilmington Blue Bombers	33–50	1–2
4B	February 7	Trenton Tigers	31–34	1–3
5B	February 14	Washington Brewers	46–35	2–3
6B	February 15	@ Washington Brewers	27–38	2–4
7B	February 21	Wilmington Blue Bombers	26–42	2–5
8B	February 28	Washington Brewers	40–35	3–5
9B	March 1	@ Wilmington Blue Bombers	45–43	4–5
10B	March 2	@ Trenton Tigers	30–44	4–6
11B	March 7	Trenton Tigers	40–43	4–7
12B	March 14	Washington Brewers	52–42	5–7

== Notes ==
^{a} The New York Jewels would drop out of the ABL by the end of the first half of the season sometime in January 1942.
