= 1937–38 Philadelphia Sphas season =

American basketball team season

- League: American Basketball League (revived original)
- Head coach: Eddie Gottlieb
- General manager: Eddie Gottlieb
- Owner(s): Eddie Gottlieb
- Arena: Broadwood Hotel

Results
- Record: 23–19 (.548)
- Place: Conference: 4th (1st half), 3rd (2nd half)
- Playoff finish: Did not qualify

The Philadelphia Sphas were an early, historical example of an American professional basketball team. The 1937–38 season was the fifth season played in the now-revived American Basketball League by the Sphas, although they did play in the original rendition of the ABL from 1926 to 1928 as the Philadelphia Warriors, which had no relation to the later BAA franchise of the same name that now exists in the present day as the Golden State Warriors in the NBA. As such, when including the past history of the original ABL with the revived version of the ABL in 1933 following historical problems that related to the Great Depression near the end of 1931, this would technically be the eleventh official season played by the original ABL properly, though this would officially be the 21st season of play for the Sphas franchise when including previous seasons where they played under names like the "Philadelphia YMHA"; the "Philadelphia Passon, Gottlieb, Black", the "Philadelphia Warriors"; and most recently, the "Philadelphia Hebrews".

== Background ==
The Sphas played in leagues around Philadelphia since 1917, but game-by-game records before the Sphas rejoined the ABL in 1933 are not (currently) available (at least, not to the general public if official game records did exist for the Sphas) and are therefore likely lost to time itself.

When trying to become three-time repeating champions of the ABL and four-time champions in five seasons for the revived league's existence, the Sphas would have a promising 6–0 start to the first half of the season before a three-game losing streak soon afterward led to the Sphas stumbling downward in positioning into an average fourth place with an above-average 12–10 record, being above the New York (Original) Celtics, the (original) Kingston Colonials, and the New York Yankees basketball team that would drop out of the ABL by the time the first half of the season concluded, but finishing behind the Brooklyn Visitations, the New Haven turned New York Jewels, and the first half champion Jersey Reds. The Sphas would have a second chance at competing for the league's championship once they entered the second half of the season; while the Sphas showcased promise once again with a 5–1 start toward that half of the season, they would ultimately stumble and fail to qualify for the championship series by finishing in third place with a barely above-average 11–9 record that placed them behind the Jersey Reds and second half champion New York Jewels this time around, which eventually led to the Reds being named the new ABL champions this time around. Because of the Sphas' placement in each half this season, this was the first time while in the revived league (and technically, the first time since the 1926–27 season in the original ABL) where Philadelphia failed to qualify for any sort championship opportunity within the ABL during the season. This was also the first season in the Sphas' history in the ABL where the Sphas played as the Philadelphia Sphas properly instead of either the original Philadelphia Warriors in the initial version of the ABL (or technically as the Philadelphia Quakers first before technically becoming the Warriors officially by the second half of their initial ABL season of play) or as the Philadelphia Hebrews that they sometimes went by in the revived version of the ABL before permanently using the Sphas name for the majority of the rest of their history going forward due to growing concerns of the rise of antisemitism within the U.S.A. before World War II was set to begin.

== Roster ==
Due to information on American Basketball League players being generally hard to find, there are bound to be more gaps and/or inaccuracies found in certain areas on the team's roster spots than usual.

1937–38 Philadelphia Sphas roster
Players

Pos.	No.	Player	Height	Weight	DOB	From
F/C		Mike Bloom	6 ft 6 in (1.98 m)	190 lb (86 kg)	1915–01–14	Temple
G/F		Lou Dubin	6 ft 0 in (1.83 m)	180 lb (82 kg)	1912–11–10	Temple
G/F		Gil Fitch	6 ft 0 in (1.83 m)	175 lb (79 kg)	1909–12–24	Temple
F/C		Moe Goldman	6 ft 3 in (1.91 m)	175 lb (79 kg)	1913–05–30	CCNY
G/F		Shikey Gotthoffer	6 ft 0 in (1.83 m)	195 lb (88 kg)	1911–01–01	NYU
G		Cy Kaselman	5 ft 10 in (1.78 m)	165 lb (75 kg)	1909–05–01	Temple
F/C		Inky Lautman	6 ft 2 in (1.88 m)	205 lb (93 kg)	1914–05–22	Central HS (PA)
F/C		Beano Resnick	6 ft 2 in (1.88 m)	195 lb (88 kg)	1916–08–17	Pierce Business College
F/C		Red Rosan	6 ft 2 in (1.88 m)	195 lb (88 kg)	1911–05–22	Temple
G		Albie Weiner	5 ft 9 in (1.75 m)	165 lb (75 kg)	1910–05–26	Rider
G		Red Wolfe	5 ft 11 in (1.80 m)	165 lb (75 kg)	1905–07–18	St. John's

Coaches
Head coach
- Eddie Gottlieb

Legend
- (DP) Unsigned draft pick
- (FA) Free agent
- (S) Suspended
- Injured

== ABL Standings ==
First Half
Team	Wins	Losses	Winning %
Jersey Reds	16	6	.727
New Haven Jewels / New York Jewels^{[a]}	12	8	.600
Brooklyn Visitations	13	10	.565
Philadelphia SPHAs	12	10	.545
New York (Original) Celtics	11	10	.524
Kingston Colonials	5	15	.250
New York Yankees^{[b]}	1	11	.083

Second Half
Team	Wins	Losses	Winning %
New York Jewels^{[a]}	14	5	.737
Jersey Reds	13	7	.650
Philadelphia SPHAs	11	9	.550
Kingston Colonials	9	9	.500
New York (Original) Celtics	7	11	.389
Brooklyn Visitations	2	15	.118

== ABL Schedule ==
First Half
#	Date	Opponent	Score	Record
1A	October 30	New Haven Jewels^{[a]}	51–30	1–0
2A	November 6	New York Yankees^{[b]}	52–36	2–0
3A	November 13	New York (Original) Celtics	64–46	3–0
4A	November 14	@ New York (Original) Celtics	41–38	4–0
5A	November 20	Kingston Colonials	47–37	5–0
6A	November 27	Jersey Reds	35–31	6–0
7A	November 28	@ Brooklyn Visitations	24–39	6–1
8A	December 2	@ Jersey Reds	22–34	6–2
9A	December 4	Brooklyn Visitations	33–34	6–3
10A	December 5	@ New York Jewels^{[a]}	44–36	7–3
11A	December 8	@ Kingston Colonials	31–36	7–4
12A	December 11	New York Jewels^{[a]}	40–44	7–5
13A	December 12	@ New York (Original) Celtics	27–39	7–6
14A	December 22	@ New York Yankees^{[b]}	40–28	8–6
15A	December 25	New York Yankees^{[b]}	46–40	9–6
16A	December 26	@ Brooklyn Visitations	29–25	10–6
17A	January 1	Jersey Reds	46–55	10–7
18A	January 2	@ Jersey Reds	27–36	10–8
19A	January 5	@ Kingston Colonials	29–36	10–9
20A	January 8	Kingston Colonials	42–20	11–9
21A	January 9	@ New York Jewels^{[a]}	33–47	11–10
22A	January 15	Brooklyn Visitations	46–42	12–10

Second Half
#	Date	Opponent	Score	Record
1B	January 22	New York Jewels^{[a]}	33–42	0–1
2B	January 23	@ Brooklyn Visitations	49–46	1–1
3B	January 27	Jersey Reds	65–47	2–1
4B	January 30	New York Jewels^{[a]}	42–34	3–1
5B	February 2	@ Kingston Colonials	46–26	4–1
6B	February 5	New York (Original) Celtics	42–35	5–1
7B	February 6	@ Jersey Reds	27–48	5–2
8B	February 12	Kingston Colonials	45–30	6–2
9B	February 17	@ New York Jewels^{[a]}	31–33	6–3
10B	February 19	Brooklyn Visitations	48–39	7–3
11B	February 20	@ New York (Original) Celtics	25–34	7–4
12B	March 5	Jersey Reds	33–38	7–5
13B	March 6	@ Brooklyn Visitations	48–24	8–5
14B	March 9	@ Kingston Colonials	29–41	8–6
15B	March 12	New York (Original) Celtics	33–26	9–6
16B	March 19	@ New York Jewels^{[a]}	30–55	9–7
17B	March 20	New York (Original) Celtics	34–37	9–8
18B	March 26	@ Brooklyn Visitations	53–37	10–8
19B	March 27	@ Jersey Reds	34–44	10–9
20B	April 2	Kingston Colonials	45–37	11–9

== Notes ==
^{a} Before the season began, the Brooklyn Jewels moved from Brooklyn, New York to New Haven, Connecticut to become the New Haven Jewels to start out the season. However, on November 30, 1937, the team moved back from New Haven to Brooklyn to once again return to their original New York Jewels name for the rest of the season.
^{b} The New York Yankees basketball team would drop out of the ABL on January 11, 1938 during the first half of the season.
