= 1947–48 Philadelphia Sphas season =

American basketball team season

- League: American Basketball League (revived original)
- Head coach: Harry Litwack
- General manager: Eddie Gottlieb; Harry Litwack; Jerry Rullo
- Owner(s): Eddie Gottlieb; Abe Radel
- Arena: Broadwood Hotel

Results
- Record: 13–19 (.406)
- Place: Conference: 6th
- Playoff finish: Did not qualify

The Philadelphia Sphas were an early, historical example of an American professional basketball team. The 1947–48 season was the fifteenth season played in the now-revived American Basketball League by the Sphas, although they did play in the original rendition of the ABL from 1926 to 1928 as the Philadelphia Warriors, which had no relation to the later BAA franchise of the same name that now exists in the present day as the Golden State Warriors in the NBA. As such, when including the past history of the original ABL with the revived version of the ABL in 1933 following historical problems that related to the Great Depression near the end of 1931, this would technically be the 21st official season played by the original ABL properly, though this would officially be the 31st season of play for the Sphas franchise when including previous seasons where they played under names like the "Philadelphia YMHA"; the "Philadelphia Passon, Gottlieb, Black", the "Philadelphia Warriors"; and the "Philadelphia Hebrews". Depending on certain outlets in mind, this season can also be seen as either the first or second season in the ABL's revived history where it would be seen as more of a minor basketball league in terms of scope when compared to both the rivaling National Basketball League and the newer Basketball Association of America.

== Background ==
The Sphas played in leagues around Philadelphia since 1917, but game-by-game records before the Sphas rejoined the ABL in 1933 are not (currently) available (at least, not to the general public if official game records did exist for the Sphas) and are therefore likely lost to time itself. After having a significant portion of their coverage being stolen by the newer Basketball Association of America (and to a somewhat lesser extent, the rivaling National Basketball League), the ABL would officially devolve from a major professional basketball league to a minor (professional) basketball league in the eyes of the general public by the start of this season. While the president of the BAA, Maurice Podoloff, would try and establish better working relationships with both the rivaling NBL and the ABL (where the Sphas were playing in), to the point of potentially implementing a championship series of sorts between all three of the (perceived) professional basketball leagues at that point in time, the efforts to have each professional basketball league of the era to work things out well enough with each other in the end would ultimately prove to be futile.

Despite losing their key veterans by this point in time alongside Eddie Gottlieb as their long-standing head coach from the previous season, the Sphas entered this season with the intent of still trying to become the champions of the ABL like they had been since they first returned to the league back in 1933. However, the lost veteran presence within the team for this season would prove to be a major detriment for the Sphas this season, as ten of the team's losses throughout the season would be by four points or less. Not only that, but the Sphas had their worst start to a season in the ABL yet with a 1–5 start following a debut win over the Lancaster (Red) Roses expansion franchise that eventually folded operations before the season concluded. As such, it made their final record of 13–19 look more deceptive than it was on the surface level since the Sphas still showcased some good talents as a team, but struggled to capitalize when the game was on the line this time around. Nevertheless, due to the record being worse than every other team outside of the Brooklyn Gothams' 8–20 record (and to a lesser extent, the Lancaster Red Roses' 1–5 record), the Sphas were considered an easy elimination from the ABL's restructured playoffs for this season. Not only that, but the Sphas franchise would officially struggle financially (partially due to now co-owner Eddie Gottlieb focusing so much more time on his (defending BAA champion) Philadelphia Warriors franchise) to the point of actually entertaining the idea of moving away from their longtime home of Philadelphia, Pennsylvania for the following season of play instead of staying intact as is and risk going bankrupt as a franchise going forward there.

== Roster ==
Due to information on American Basketball League players being generally hard to find (especially by the time the ABL was designated more as a minor league during its later years of existence), there are bound to be more gaps and/or inaccuracies found in certain areas on the team's roster spots than usual.

1947–48 Philadelphia Sphas roster
Players

Pos.	No.	Player	Height	Weight	DOB	From
		Oscar Baldwin			1925–01–07	Muhlenberg
F		Cy Boardman	6 ft 2 in (1.88 m)	185 lb (84 kg)	1915–08–24	NYU
F		Stan Brown	6 ft 3 in (1.91 m)	200 lb (91 kg)	1929–06–27	South Philadelphia HS (PA)
G		Joe Della Monica			1927–09–28	Penn
G		George Feigenbaum	6 ft 1 in (1.85 m)	185 lb (84 kg)	1929–07–02	Kentucky
G		Red Klotz	5 ft 7 in (1.70 m)	150 lb (68 kg)	1920–10–21	Villanova
G		Eddie Lyons			1926–07–01	Temple
		Jack McGaffney			1924–04–01	Atlantic City Trade School (NJ)
C		Elmore Morgenthaler	6 ft 9 in (2.06 m)	230 lb (104 kg)	1922–08–03	Boston College
F		John Murphy	6 ft 2 in (1.88 m)	175 lb (79 kg)	1924–09–13	Simon Gratz HS (PA)
F/C		Jack Rocker	6 ft 5 in (1.96 m)	210 lb (95 kg)	1922–08–12	California
G		Jerry Rullo	5 ft 10 in (1.78 m)	165 lb (75 kg)	1923–06–23	Temple
G/F		Butch Schwartz	6 ft 2 in (1.88 m)	190 lb (86 kg)	1919–02–14	Long Island
		Mendy Snyder			1915–01–31	Temple
		Aaron Tanitsky			1926–01–14	Penn
G/F		Leonard Weiner	6 ft 1 in (1.85 m)	180 lb (82 kg)	1923–10–26	Unknown
G/F		Bill Zeiss			1925–06–07	Saint Joseph's

Coaches
Head coach
- Harry Litwack

Legend
- (DP) Unsigned draft pick
- (FA) Free agent
- (S) Suspended
- Injured

== ABL Standings ==
Due to the decreased number of teams this season, the ABL would remove divisions from their league this season going forward after previously using them for their previous season of play.

Pos.	Team	Wins	Losses	Win %
1	Wilkes-Barre Barons	26	8	.765
2	Paterson Crescents	19	16	.543
3	Trenton Tigers	17	15	.531
4	Jersey City Atoms / Scranton Miners^{[a]}	16	16	.500
5	Elizabeth Braves / Hartford Hurricanes^{[b]}	11	12	.478
6	Philadelphia SPHAs	13	19	.406
7	Brooklyn Gothams	8	20	.286
8	Lancaster (Red) Roses^{[c]}	1	5	.167

== ABL Schedule ==
For the rest of the ABL's entire existence going forward, the ABL would utilize a proper, full regular season instead of two half-seasons for its regular season formatting.

#	Date	Opponent	Score	Record
1	November 9	@ Lancaster Red Roses^{[c]}	59–57	1–0
2	November 13	Trenton Tigers	60–71	1–1
3	November 16	@ Brooklyn Gothams	73–74	1–2
4	November 20	Wilkes-Barre Barons	59–61	1–3
5	November 23	@ Trenton Tigers	74–77	1–4
6	November 26	@ Jersey City Atoms^{[a]}	67–71	1–5
7	December 2	Jersey City Atoms^{[a]}	88–77	2–5
8	December 3	Lancaster Roses^{[c]}	56–50	3–5
9	December 6	@ Paterson Crescents	73–75	3–6
10	December 7	@ Trenton Tigers	71–69	4–6
11	December 16	Brooklyn Gothams	81–71	5–6
12	December 17	@ Wilkes-Barre Barons	57–65	5–7
13	December 26	Paterson Crescents	43–47	5–8
14	January 3	@ Paterson Crescents	65–76	5–9
15	January 9	@ Hartford Hurricanes^{[b]}	87–85	6–9
16	January 11	@ Brooklyn Gothams	68–61	7–9
17	January 16	Wilkes-Barre Barons	74–70	8–9
18	January 18	@ Trenton Tigers	76–80	8–10
19	January 20	Trenton Tigers	75–61	9–10
20	January 21	@ Wilkes-Barre Barons	53–73	9–11
21	January 31	@ Paterson Crescents	65–72	9–12
22	February 11	@ Wilkes-Barre Barons	47–64	9–13
23	February 12	Hartford Hurricanes^{[b]}	74–64	10–13
24	February 15	@ Brooklyn Gothams	71–73	10–14
25	March 5	@ Hartford Hurricanes^{[b]}	80–73	11–14
26	March 10	@ Scranton Miners^{[a]}	76–83	11–15
27	March 11	Paterson Crescents	65–59	12–15
28	March 13	@ Paterson Crescents	80–86	12–16
29	March 14	@ Trenton Tigers	84–87	12–17
30	March 17	@ Wilkes-Barre Barons	58–62	12–18
31	March 18	Brooklyn Gothams	61–52	13–18
32	March 21	@ Scranton Miners^{[a]}	69–74	13–19

== Notes ==
^{a} Originally, the Jersey City Atoms would move from Jersey City, New Jersey to nearby Union City, New Jersey on January 16, 1948 (though it doesn't appear that the Jersey City Atoms rebranded their team by this point in time) before moving again to Scranton, Pennsylvania to become the Scranton Miners twelve days later on January 28, 1948, for the rest of the season going forward.
^{b} The Elizabeth Braves (which the Sphas did not play against this time around during this season, though they would compete against them during their previous season of play) would move from Elizabeth, New Jersey to Hartford, Connecticut on December 19, 1947 to become the Hartford Hurricanes for the rest of the season.
^{c} The Lancaster Roses (sometimes referred to as the Lancaster Red Roses instead) would end up withdrawing their operations from the ABL early in the season on December 4, 1947 to return to the Eastern Professional Basketball League not long afterward.
