= 1929–30 Philadelphia Sphas season =

American basketball team season

- League champions
- League: Eastern Basketball League
- Head coach: Eddie Gottlieb
- General manager: Eddie Gottlieb
- Owner(s): Eddie Gottlieb; Harry Passon; Edwin "Hughie" Black
- Arena: Broadwood Hotel

Results
- Record: 30–7 (.811)
- Place: Conference: 2nd (first half), 1st (second half)
- Playoff finish: Eastern Basketball League Champions (Won 3-2 over the Philadelphia Elks)

The 1929–30 season was the first season of play for the Philadelphia Sphas while operating in the Eastern Basketball League (which was both established the previous season and was not to be confused with the Eastern League that the Sphas previously played in a few seasons ago), though it would officially be their twelfth season of play when including previous seasons they were operating in some different leagues as different team names by comparison to their final Sphas name. After previously playing primarily as an independently ran squad following a six-game losing streak to end their final season in the Philadelphia Basket Ball League, the Sphas would enter the Eastern Basketball League in the hopes of having some better structure there. Because of that, the Sphas would once again return to playing in over 30 games for a season, with the Sphas winning at least 30 total games in a season for the second time in three seasons within the franchise's history (with the season before this one not really counting due to the Sphas leaving the Philadelphia Basket Ball League early on in that season's brief, returning existence). However, game-by-game records are (currently) not available for this season and are therefore likely lost to time in the process.

For the first half of their first season in the Eastern Basketball League, the Sphas would finish in second place with an impressive 16–4 record, though their above-average record would still fall short to their inner city rivals that season in the Philadelphia Elks, who had an incredible 17–3 record on their hands by comparison. Luckily for the Sphas, however, the second half of their first season in the Eastern Basketball League would see them have a first-place finish to have a better win percentage record with a 14–3 for a .824 win percentage that would not only be better overall than the Wilmington Cardinals, but also get them to compete in a championship series against their local rivals this season in the Philadelphia Elks. While the scores for the championship series are not 100% certain somewhere between Games 2 and 4 due to the only place showcasing the actual championship series publicly has a second Elks victory be mistaken as a Sphas victory somewhere, the result would showcase that the Sphas would win the first Eastern Basketball League championship over the Elks in a close 3–2 series victory. Unfortunately, due to the status of the Eastern Basketball League during this season, records of the first season of the Eastern Basketball League are less publicly known by comparison to the American Basketball League due to the Eastern Basketball League being seen as a minor basketball league, meaning knowledge of who was on this team's championship roster this is less known when compared to other championship rosters of theirs.

== Roster ==
Due to information on older (professional) basketball leagues being generally hard (if not outright impossible these days) to find for players from leagues like the Eastern Basketball League, there are bound to be more gaps and/or inaccuracies found in certain areas on the team's roster spots than usual. In fact, because of the nature that the Eastern Basketball League was being regarded at the time (which was officially being regarded as a minor (professional) basketball league due to how it was stacked up and viewed in regards to comparisons with the earlier, more nationally established American Basketball League of that era at the time), there is currently no available source for the team's overall roster in terms of who was playing for the team officially throughout the season at the time, with the final listed roster being considered the roster that's considered "officially" listed at hand for the team's championship roster during their run at the Eastern Basketball League's championship series during this season.

1929–30 Philadelphia Sphas roster
Players

Pos.	No.	Player	Height	Weight	DOB	From
F/C		Lou Forman	6 ft 2 in (1.88 m)	160 lb (73 kg)	1906–08–05	Dickinson
G		Cy Kaselman	5 ft 10 in (1.78 m)	165 lb (75 kg)	1909–05–01	Temple
G/F		Babe Liman	6 ft 0 in (1.83 m)	150 lb (68 kg)	1907–01–01	NYU
G		Harry Litwack	5 ft 7 in (1.70 m)	170 lb (77 kg)	1907–09–20	Temple
G		Chickie Passon	5 ft 7 in (1.70 m)	165 lb (75 kg)	1900–05–30	Penn
F/C		Reds Sherr	6 ft 2 in (1.88 m)	210 lb (95 kg)	1905-02-02	Penn
G		Yock Welsh	5 ft 6 in (1.68 m)		Unknown	No college
G		Red Wolfe	5 ft 11 in (1.80 m)	165 lb (75 kg)	1905–07–18	St. John's

Coaches
Head coach
- Eddie Gottlieb

Legend
- (DP) Unsigned draft pick
- (FA) Free agent
- (S) Suspended
- Injured

== Eastern Basketball League Standings ==
First Half
Team	Wins	Losses	Winning %
Philadelphia Elks	17	3	.850
Philadelphia SPHAs	16	4	.800
Pattison Coffee-Grinders	10	10	.500
Wilmington Cardinals	7	13	.360
Camden Skeeters	6	14	.300
Kennett Square Farmers	4	16	.200

Second Half
Team	Wins	Losses	Winning %
Philadelphia SPHAs	14	3	.824
Wilmington Cardinals	10	8	.556
Philadelphia Elks	8	8	.500
Camden Skeeters	8	9	.471
Kennett Square Farmers	5	11	.313
Pattison Coffee-Grinders	5	11	.313

== Eastern Basketball League Championship Series ==
Philadelphia Elks (1st Half Champions) Vs. Philadelphia Sphas (2nd Half Champions): Philadelphia Sphas win series 3–2.

- Game 1: The Elks defeated the Sphas 36–38.
- Game 2: The Elks defeated the Sphas 34–21.
- Game 3: Sphas defeated the Elks 33–29.
- Game 4: Sphas defeated the Elks 34–30.
- Game 5: Sphas defeated the Elks 32–24.
