= 1931–32 Philadelphia Sphas season =

American basketball team season

- League champions
- Conference champions
- League: Eastern Basketball League
- Head coach: Eddie Gottlieb
- General manager: Eddie Gottlieb
- Owner(s): Eddie Gottlieb; Harry Passon; Edwin "Hughie" Black
- Arena: Broadwood Hotel

Results
- Record: 29–9 (.763)
- Place: Conference: T-1st (first half), 1st (second half)
- Playoff finish: Eastern Basketball League Champions (Won 3-1 over the Philadelphia Moose)

The 1931–32 season was the third season of play for the Philadelphia Sphas while operating in the Eastern Basketball League (not to be confused with the Eastern League that the Sphas previously played in a few seasons ago, although some outlets would call this league the Eastern States Basketball League instead during this season and the upcoming, following season of play), though it would officially be their fourteenth season of play when including previous seasons they were operating in some different leagues as different team names by comparison to their final Sphas name. Entering this season, the Sphas looked to have a three-peat for the Eastern Basketball League championship after previously winning a close best-of-five championship series over the Philadelphia Elks in their first season in the EBL and then winning 3-1 over the Camden Skeeters in their second season there. However, due in part to the Camden Skeeters forfeiting their position in the Eastern Basketball League for the second half of the season after only playing in 10 total games for that half of the season (all of which ending in defeats for the Camden franchise), the Sphas would fail to win at least 30 games this season due to them winning only 29 games throughout a combined 38 total games played this season. Despite the circumstances involved for this season, however, game-by-game records are (currently) not available for this season and are therefore likely lost to time in the process.

For the first half of the season, the Sphas would tie their recorded position with the Philadelphia Moose (who might have been the Philadelphia Elks being rebranded as a franchise during this season) with an above-average 15–5 record for first place in the league during that half of the season. Unfortunately for the Sphas, the Philadelphia Moose franchise would win the first place tiebreaker match for this half of the season (though results for that match ultimately weren't recorded properly for that particular point in time as of 2026), which led to the Sphas needing to win their second half of the season outright if they wanted a shot at being three-time champions in the Eastern Basketball League. Luckily for the Sphas, they would end up having a very convincing lead for the second half of the EBL this time around, as they would end up finishing that half of the season with a 14–4 record for an easy first place finish there (well ahead of the Bridgeton Moose franchise), leaving the championship series to be between the Sphas and their (new) inner city rivals in the Philadelphia Moose. While the two Philadelphia-based teams would end up splitting their first two games against each other, the Sphas would ultimately win the championship series 3–1 to secure their three-time championship in the Eastern Basketball League, which would finally be considered a major, professional basketball league this season due to the American Basketball League (temporarily) shutting down operations this season.

== Roster ==
Due to information on older (professional) basketball leagues being generally hard (if not outright impossible these days) to find for players from leagues like the Eastern Basketball League, there are bound to be more gaps and/or inaccuracies found in certain areas on the team's roster spots than usual.

1931–32 Philadelphia Sphas roster
Players

| Pos. | No. | Player | Height | Weight | DOB | From |
|---|---|---|---|---|---|---|
| G | | Solly Bertman | 6 ft 0 in (1.83 m) | | 1910–02–05 | Temple |
| F/C | | Lou Forman | 6 ft 2 in (1.88 m) | 160 lb (73 kg) | 1906–08–05 | Dickinson |
| G | | Cy Kaselman | 5 ft 10 in (1.78 m) | 165 lb (75 kg) | 1909–05–01 | Temple |
| G/F | | Babe Liman | 6 ft 0 in (1.83 m) | 150 lb (68 kg) | 1907–01–01 | NYU |
| G | | Harry Litwack | 5 ft 7 in (1.70 m) | 170 lb (77 kg) | 1907–09–20 | Temple |
| G | | Chickie Passon | 5 ft 7 in (1.70 m) | 165 lb (75 kg) | 1900–05–30 | Penn |
| G | | Mac Posnack | 5 ft 11 in (1.80 m) | 195 lb (88 kg) | 1909–06–23 | St. John's |
| F/C | | Reds Sherr | 6 ft 2 in (1.88 m) | 210 lb (95 kg) | 1905-02-02 | Penn |
| G | | Yock Welsh | 5 ft 6 in (1.68 m) | | Unknown | No college |
| G | | Red Wolfe | 5 ft 11 in (1.80 m) | 165 lb (75 kg) | 1905–07–18 | St. John's |

Coaches
Head coach
- Eddie Gottlieb

Legend
- (DP) Unsigned draft pick
- (FA) Free agent
- (S) Suspended
- Injured

In addition to these guys on this season's team, there was also a player who had the last name of Davis that was also briefly on the team's roster as well. That guy alongside Solly Bertman and Babe Liman ultimately didn't take part in the team's official roster by the time the EBL's championship series had begun for one reason or another.

== Eastern Basketball League Standings ==
First Half
| Team | Wins | Losses | Winning % |
|---|---|---|---|
| Philadelphia Moose | 15 | 5 | .750 |
| Philadelphia SPHAs | 15 | 5 | .750 |
| Wilmington Cardinals | 8 | 8 | .500 |
| Bridgeton Moose | 8 | 10 | .444 |
| Camden Skeeters | 4 | 12 | .250 |
| Philadelphia Jasper Jewels | 4 | 14 | .222 |

The Philadelphia Moose would defeat the Philadelphia Sphas in their first place tiebreaker match to end the first half of the season.

Second Half
| Team | Wins | Losses | Winning % |
|---|---|---|---|
| Philadelphia SPHAs | 14 | 4 | .778 |
| Bridgeton Moose | 10 | 5 | .667 |
| Philadelphia Moose | 10 | 9 | .526 |
| Philadelphia Jasper Jewels | 7 | 10 | .412 |
| Wilmington Cardinals | 7 | 10 | .412 |
| Camden Skeeters | 0 | 10 | .000 |

* – The Camden Skeeters would forfeit operations during the second half of the season on February 15, 1932.

== Eastern Basketball League Championship Series ==
Philadelphia Moose (1st Half Tiebreaker Champions) Vs. Philadelphia Sphas (2nd Half Champions): Philadelphia Sphas win series 3–1.

- Game 1: The Philadelphia Sphas defeated the Philadelphia Moose 30–26.
- Game 2: The Philadelphia Moose defeated the Philadelphia Sphas 17–31.
- Game 3: The Philadelphia Sphas defeated the Philadelphia Moose 39–29.
- Game 4: The Philadelphia Sphas defeated the Philadelphia Moose 29–22.
