= 1930–31 Philadelphia Sphas season =

American basketball team season

- League champions
- League: Eastern Basketball League
- Head coach: Eddie Gottlieb
- General manager: Eddie Gottlieb
- Owner(s): Eddie Gottlieb; Harry Passon; Edwin "Hughie" Black
- Arena: Broadwood Hotel

Results
- Record: 31–9 (.775)
- Place: Conference: 1st (first half), 2nd (second half)
- Playoff finish: Eastern Basketball League Champions (Won 3-1 over the Camden Skeeters)

The 1930–31 season was the second season of play for the Philadelphia Sphas while operating in the Eastern Basketball League (not to be confused with the Eastern League that the Sphas previously played in a few seasons ago), though it would officially be their thirteenth season of play when including previous seasons they were operating in some different leagues as different team names by comparison to their final Sphas name. Entering this season, the Sphas looked to repeat as Eastern Basketball League champions after winning a close best-of-five championship series over the Philadelphia Elks. However, in a combined 40 games played this season, the Sphas would once again win over 30 games this season with 31 total games ending in a victory on their ends. Despite the high number of victories the Sphas had this season, game-by-game records are (currently) not available for this season and are therefore likely lost to time in the process.

For the first half of the season in the Eastern Basketball League, the Sphas would end up finishing that half with a first-place finish with an above-average 17–3 record, with their record being one game above that of their inner city rivals in the Philadelphia Elks. While the Sphas had an opportunity to secure the Eastern Basketball League's championship by default through winning the second half of the season, they ended up finishing that half of the season by being one game behind the Camden Skeeters, with their above-average 15–5 record overtaking the Sphas' 14–6 record for a second-place finish (ahead of the Philadelphia Elks with their 13–7 record) to secure a championship series between the Philadelphia Sphas and the Camden Skeeters. Initially, the Camden Skeeters would win a close Game 1 match over the Philadelphia Sphas with a 30–29 defeat on the Sphas' end. However, the Philadelphia squad would respond back with an edge in Game 2 through a 40–28 home victory before later securing their second straight Eastern Basketball League championship with a 3–1 series victory, concluding in their home venue. Unfortunately, due to the status of the Eastern Basketball League during this season, similar to the first season where the Sphas won their first championship in that league, records of the second season of the Eastern Basketball League are less publicly known by comparison to the American Basketball League due to the Eastern Basketball League being seen as a minor basketball league, meaning knowledge of who was on this team's championship roster this is less known when compared to other championship rosters of theirs.

== Roster ==
Due to information on older (professional) basketball leagues being generally hard (if not outright impossible these days) to find for players from leagues like the Eastern Basketball League, there are bound to be more gaps and/or inaccuracies found in certain areas on the team's roster spots than usual. In fact, because of the nature that the Eastern Basketball League was being regarded at the time (which was officially being regarded as a minor (professional) basketball league due to how it was stacked up and viewed in regards to comparisons with the earlier, more nationally established American Basketball League of that era at the time), there is currently no available source for the team's overall roster in terms of who was playing for the team officially throughout the season at the time, with the final listed roster being considered the roster that's considered "officially" listed at hand for the team's championship roster during their run at the Eastern Basketball League's championship series during this season.

1930–31 Philadelphia Sphas roster
Players

Pos.	No.	Player	Height	Weight	DOB	From
F/C		Lou Forman	6 ft 2 in (1.88 m)	160 lb (73 kg)	1906–08–05	Dickinson
G		Cy Kaselman	5 ft 10 in (1.78 m)	165 lb (75 kg)	1909–05–01	Temple
G/F		Babe Liman	6 ft 0 in (1.83 m)	150 lb (68 kg)	1907–01–01	NYU
G		Harry Litwack	5 ft 7 in (1.70 m)	170 lb (77 kg)	1907–09–20	Temple
G		Chickie Passon	5 ft 7 in (1.70 m)	165 lb (75 kg)	1900–05–30	Penn
F/C		Reds Sherr	6 ft 2 in (1.88 m)	210 lb (95 kg)	1905-02-02	Penn
G		Yock Welsh	5 ft 6 in (1.68 m)		Unknown	No college
G		Red Wolfe	5 ft 11 in (1.80 m)	165 lb (75 kg)	1905–07–18	St. John's

Coaches
Head coach
- Eddie Gottlieb

Legend
- (DP) Unsigned draft pick
- (FA) Free agent
- (S) Suspended
- Injured

== Eastern Basketball League Standings ==
First Half
Team	Wins	Losses	Winning %
Philadelphia SPHAs	17	3	.850
Philadelphia Elks	16	4	.800
Camden Skeeters	9	7	.563
Kennett Square	7	12	.368
Philadelphia Turners*	3	14	.176
Wilmington Cardinals	3	15	.167

Second Half
Team	Wins	Losses	Winning %
Camden Skeeters	15	5	.750
Philadelphia SPHAs	14	6	.700
Philadelphia Elks	13	7	.650
Reading Bears*	7	13	.350
Wilmington Cardinals	6	14	.300
Kennett Square	5	15	.250

* – The Philadelphia Turners would end up being replaced by the Reading Bears by the time the second half of the season began.

== Eastern Basketball League Championship Series ==
Philadelphia Sphas (1st Half Champions) Vs. Camden Skeeters (2nd Half Champions): Philadelphia Sphas win series 3–1.

- Game 1 @ Camden: The Camden Skeeters defeated the Philadelphia Sphas 29–30.
- Game 2 @ Philadelphia: The Philadelphia Sphas defeated the Camden Skeeters 40–28.
- Game 3 @ Camden: The Philadelphia Sphas defeated the Camden Skeeters 32–29.
- Game 4 @ Philadelphia: The Philadelphia Sphas defeated the Camden Skeeters 36–33.
