= 1939–40 Philadelphia Sphas season =

American basketball team season

- League champions
- Conference champions
- League: American Basketball League (revived original)
- Head coach: Eddie Gottlieb
- General manager: Eddie Gottlieb
- Owner(s): Eddie Gottlieb
- Arena: Broadwood Hotel

Results
- Record: 19–13 (.594)
- Place: Conference: T-1st with Washington Brewers
- Playoff finish: ABL Champions (Won ABL Round-Robin Tournament over the Baltimore Clippers, New York Jewels, Troy Celtics, and Washington Heurich Brewers)

The Philadelphia Sphas were an early, historical example of an American professional basketball team. The 1939–40 season was the seventh season played in the now-revived American Basketball League by the Sphas, although they did play in the original rendition of the ABL from 1926 to 1928 as the Philadelphia Warriors, which had no relation to the later BAA franchise of the same name that now exists in the present day as the Golden State Warriors in the NBA. As such, when including the past history of the original ABL with the revived version of the ABL in 1933 following historical problems that related to the Great Depression near the end of 1931, this would technically be the thirteenth official season played by the original ABL properly, though this would officially be the 23rd season of play for the Sphas franchise when including previous seasons where they played under names like the "Philadelphia YMHA"; the "Philadelphia Passon, Gottlieb, Black", the "Philadelphia Warriors"; and the "Philadelphia Hebrews".

== Background ==
The Sphas played in leagues around Philadelphia since 1917, but game-by-game records before the Sphas rejoined the ABL in 1933 are not (currently) available (at least, not to the general public if official game records did exist for the Sphas) and are therefore likely lost to time itself. This would also become the second straight season in the American Basketball League's revived format (and the third overall season in the ABL's history) where the league would have one whole season properly instead of two half seasons of play, though this season would become the only season in the ABL's history where the league's championship would be determined by a round-robin tournament style of formatting instead of either a regular playoff formatting or a championship series match-up between the two best teams in each half-season of play due to the amount of teams either merging with each other or otherwise leaving the league by the end of the season.

When trying to reclaim their place as champions of the ABL for the fourth time in seven seasons, the Sphas would end up tying this season with the now-rebranded Washington Heurich Brewers for a first-place finish with an above-average 19–13 record (though the Sphas would later be named the sole winners for first place in the ABL this season following a 34–27 home victory on March 9, 1940, over the Heurich Brewers that was considered the official tiebreaker first place match of the season). Not only that, but the ABL was originally planning on utilizing another playoff format similar to the previous season they had due to them using a full season format instead of two half-season formats for a potential championship series match-up between the two half-season winners before the ABL decreased its number of teams from eight to five due to the merger of the Troy Haymakers and the (original) Kingston Colonials into the Troy Celtics, the merger of the New York Jewels and the Jersey Reds into the same New York Jewels team that would survive for the long-term, and the (original) Wilkes-Barre Barons dropping out of the league respectively. Because of the sudden, drastic reduction of teams throughout the season with every surviving team having relatively close records toward each other, the ABL decided that instead of having a proper playoff format like its previous season of play, they would utilize a round-robin tournament format where each one of the Philadelphia Sphas, Washington Heurich Brewers, Troy Celtics, New York Celtics, and Baltimore Clippers would play each other twice in a row before one of them was declared the league's champions for this season (though this round-robin tournament would result in the Sphas not participating in the 1940 World Professional Basketball Tournament alongside the Washington Heurich Brewers), although one game between the New York Jewels and Washington Heurich Brewers was ultimately cancelled without ever being played since it failed to make a difference in the overall tournament's standings (outside of potentially having Washington be tied with Baltimore for last place). Following the Sphas' first tournament win over the Troy Celtics on March 16, 1940, Philadelphia would end up going undefeated throughout the rest of the round-robin tournament, finishing it in first place with a perfect 8–0 record (with the Troy Celtics being in second place for a 6–2 finish, followed by the New York Jewels with a 3–4 record, then the Washington Heurich Brewers with a 1–6 record, and finally the Baltimore Clippers with a 1–7 finale) to give the Sphas their fourth ever ABL championship in seven seasons played within the revived ABL's history.

== Roster ==
Due to information on American Basketball League players being generally hard to find, there are bound to be more gaps and/or inaccuracies found in certain areas on the team's roster spots than usual.

1939–40 Philadelphia Sphas roster
Players

| Pos. | No. | Player | Height | Weight | DOB | From |
|---|---|---|---|---|---|---|
| F/C | | Mike Bloom | 6 ft 6 in (1.98 m) | 190 lb (86 kg) | 1915–01–14 | Temple |
| F | | Cy Boardman | 6 ft 2 in (1.88 m) | 185 lb (84 kg) | 1915–08–24 | NYU |
| F/C | | Moe Goldman | 6 ft 3 in (1.91 m) | 175 lb (79 kg) | 1913–05–30 | CCNY |
| G/F | | Shikey Gotthoffer | 6 ft 0 in (1.83 m) | 195 lb (88 kg) | 1911–01–01 | NYU |
| G | | Leo Gottlieb | 5 ft 11 in (1.80 m) | 180 lb (82 kg) | 1920–11–28 | DeWitt Clinton HS (NY) |
| G | | Cy Kaselman | 5 ft 10 in (1.78 m) | 165 lb (75 kg) | 1909–05–01 | Temple |
| F/C | | Inky Lautman | 6 ft 2 in (1.88 m) | 205 lb (93 kg) | 1914–05–22 | Central HS (PA) |
| G | | Phil Rabin | 5 ft 9 in (1.75 m) | 160 lb (73 kg) | 1913–07–10 | Long Island |
| F/C | | Red Rosan | 6 ft 2 in (1.88 m) | 195 lb (88 kg) | 1911–05–22 | Temple |
| G | | Petey Rosenberg | 5 ft 10 in (1.78 m) | 165 lb (75 kg) | 1918–04–07 | Saint Joseph's |
| G | | Red Wolfe | 5 ft 11 in (1.80 m) | 165 lb (75 kg) | 1905–07–18 | St. John's |

Coaches
Head coach
- Eddie Gottlieb

Legend
- (DP) Unsigned draft pick
- (FA) Free agent
- (S) Suspended
- Injured

Note: Mike Bloom, Leo Gottlieb (not related to team owner, general manager, and head coach Eddie Gottlieb), and Phil Rabin would not play for the team during the 1940 ABL Round-Robin Tournament that would end up replacing the usual ABL Championship Series this time around.

== ABL Standings ==
| Pos. | League Standings | Wins | Losses | Win % |
|---|---|---|---|---|
| T–1 | Philadelphia SPHAs^{[a]} | 19 | 13 | .594 |
| T–1 | Washington Heurich Brewers^{[a]} | 19 | 13 | .594 |
| 3 | Troy Celtics^{[b]} | 19 | 15 | .559 |
| 4 | New York Jewels^{[c]} | 15 | 15 | .500 |
| 5 | Baltimore Clippers | 15 | 16 | .484 |
| 6* | Kingston Colonials^{[b]} | 8 | 4 | .667 |
| 7* | Jersey Reds^{[c]} | 7 | 14 | .333 |
| 8* | Troy Haymakers^{[b]} | 3 | 9 | .250 |
| 9* | Wilkes-Barre Barons^{[d]} | 5 | 17 | .227 |

* – Unofficial placement for the team this season.

== ABL Schedule ==
This season would mark the second straight season in the revived version of the ABL's history to have a regular, full regular season instead of two half seasons merged into one whole season of play. However, due to the way this season of the ABL went down, the playoff formatting for this season would eventually get reduced down into a round-robin tournament format for a championship setting (which was the first and only time the ABL would do such a thing).

| # | Date | Opponent | Score | Record |
| 1 | November 4 | Wilkes-Barre Barons^{[d]} | 50–34 | 1–0 |
| 2 | November 8 | @ Kingston Colonials^{[b]} | 44–29 | 2–0 |
| 3 | November 11 | Kingston Colonials^{[b]} | 39–41 | 2–1 |
| 4 | November 16 | @ Wilkes-Barre Barons^{[d]} | 59–42 | 3–1 |
| 5 | November 18 | Jersey Reds^{[c]} | 47–37 | 4–1 |
| 6 | November 19 | @ Jersey Reds^{[c]} | 44–46 | 4–2 |
| 7 | November 24 | @ Baltimore Clippers | 32–38 | 4–3 |
| 8 | November 25 | Washington Heurich Brewers | 51–37 | 5–3 |
| 9 | December 9 | Troy Haymakers^{[b]} | 59–45 | 6–3 |
| 10 | December 10 | @ New York Jewels^{[c]} | 32–24 | 7–3 |
| 11 | December 14 | @ Washington Heurich Brewers | 35–26 | 8–3 |
| 12 | December 16 | Baltimore Clippers | 35–36 | 8–4 |
| 13 | December 20 | @ Troy Celtics^{[b]} | 38–40 (OT) | 8–5 |
| 14 | December 23 | Jersey Reds^{[c]} | 40–31 | 9–5 |
| 15 | January 6 | New York Jewels^{[c]} | 39–41 | 9–6 |
| 16 | January 13 | Baltimore Clippers | 46–44 | 10–6 |
| 17 | January 14 | @ New York Jewels^{[c]} | 44–21 | 11–6 |
| 18 | January 17 | @ Troy Celtics^{[b]} | 36–19 | 12–6 |
| 19 | January 20 | Troy Celtics^{[b]} | 36–38 | 12–7 |
| 20 | January 27 | Washington Heurich Brewers | 38–31 | 13–7 |
| 21 | January 29 | Wilkes-Barre Barons^{[d]} | 44–32 | 14–7 |
| 22 | February 3 | New York Jewels^{[c]} | 39–51 | 14–8 |
| 23 | February 4 (Game 1) | @ Washington Heurich Brewers | 33–43 | 14–9 |
| 24 | February 4 (Game 2) | @ Baltimore Clippers | 40–34 | 15–9 |
| 25 | February 10 | Troy Celtics^{[b]} | 32–38 | 15–10 |
| 26 | February 14 | @ Troy Celtics^{[b]} | 30–43 | 15–11 |
| 27 | February 17 | Washington Heurich Brewers | 30–31 | 15–12 |
| 28 | February 18 | @ New York Jewels^{[c]} | 34–25 | 16–12 |
| 29 | February 22 | @ Washington Heurich Brewers | 29–21 | 17–12 |
| 30 | February 24 | Baltimore Clippers | 51–36 | 18–12 |
| 31 | February 25 | @ Baltimore Clippers | 35–37 | 18–13 |
| 32 | March 2 | New York Jewels^{[c]} | 44–27 | 19–13 |
| 33 (T) | March 9 | Washington Heurich Brewers^{[a]} | 34–27 | 20–13 |

The last game played would technically be considered a tiebreaker match for first place in the ABL this season. At least one resource would misconstrue the tiebreaker first place game against the Washington Heurich Brewers as something that would be considered as the equivalent of a proper championship series playoff (match-up) that the ABL would normally have held by this point in time due to the fact that the ABL had previously held championship series tournaments before this point in time combined with the facts that both Philadelphia and Washington were the two best teams in the league, both Philadelphia and Washington would compete in the impromptu round-robin tournament that the ABL held this season, and the Philadelphia Sphas eventually became the champions of the league anyway by having a perfect record in that event all the same.

== ABL Round-Robin Tournament Standings ==
| Pos. | League Standings | Wins | Losses | Win % |
|---|---|---|---|---|
| 1 | Philadelphia SPHAs | 8 | 0 | 1.000 |
| 2 | Troy Celtics^{[b]} | 6 | 2 | .750 |
| 3 | New York Jewels^{[c]} | 3 | 4 | .429 |
| 4 | Washington Heurich Brewers | 1 | 6 | .143 |
| 5 | Baltimore Clippers | 1 | 7 | .125 |

One game between the New York Jewels and the Washington Heurich Brewers ultimately became cancelled near the end of the Round Robin Tournament.

== ABL Round-Robin Tournament ==
Due to the unique circumstances involved with this season of play (namely seeing the eight-team league go down to only five competitive teams by the end of the season due to multiple team mergers and a folding occur in the case of the (original) Wilkes-Barre Barons franchise), the ABL would implement their first and only round-robin tournament setting instead of a more typical playoff format like what was done in some past ABL seasons or like within the rivaling National Basketball League or even only utilizing a championship round with the two best teams of the league (in this case, the Philadelphia Sphas and the Washington Heurich Brewers) similar to most other ABL seasons by comparison. With this round-robin tournament, the remaining five teams from this season (the Philadelphia Sphas, Washington Heurich Brewers, Troy Celtics, New York Jewels, and Baltimore Clippers) would compete in a unique tournament where each of the five remaining ABL teams would compete against each other twice (once at home and once on the road, though it wouldn't always be the case during this tournament) in order to help determine the champion of the ABL (with a potential tiebreaker series later being in mind if it was deemed necessary in the end). Luckily for the ABL's case, they wouldn't need to do a tiebreaker afterward, as the Philadelphia Sphas would end up having a perfect 8–0 record after defeating each of the Washington Heurich Brewers, Troy Celtics, New York Jewels, and Baltimore Clippers twice in that round-robin tournament, with their wins over the Troy Celtics on March 16 & April 3, 1940 in particular being the games that helped lead to the Sphas winning the ABL's championship (their fourth one in seven seasons in the revived league) in the process.

ABL Round-Robin Tournament
| Game | Date | Opponent | Score | Record |
|---|---|---|---|---|
| Game 1 | March 16 | Troy Celtics^{[b]} | 32–29 | 1–0 |
| Game 2 | March 17 | @ New York Jewels^{[c]} | 33–27 | 2–0 |
| Game 3 | March 23 | Baltimore Clippers | 43–36 | 3–0 |
| Game 4 | March 24 | @ Baltimore Clippers | 51–32 | 4–0 |
| Game 5 | March 30 | New York Jewels^{[c]} | 37–35 | 5–0 |
| Game 6 | April 3 | @ Troy Celtics^{[b]} | 32–28 | 6–0 |
| Game 7 | April 6 | Washington Heurich Brewers | 51–44 | 7–0 |
| Game 8 | April 8 | @ Washington Heurich Brewers^{[e]} | 48–30 | 8–0 |

The Philadelphia Sphas would be crowned the league's champions for this season due to them finishing the ABL's Round-Robin Tournament with a perfect 8–0 record.

== Notes ==
^{a} The Philadelphia Sphas would defeat the Washington Heurich Brewers on March 9, 1940, with a 34–27 final score to secure first place officially with what could be considered a 20–13 record (.606 win percentage) on the Sphas' end and a 19–14 record (.576 win percentage) on the Heurich Brewers' end instead of an officially recorded 19–13 record (.594 win percentage) for both teams.
^{b} Despite being tied with the Sphas for what could be considered as the best team in the ABL at that point in time during this season with an 8–4 record, the Kingston Colonials would end up merging operations with the Troy Haymakers to become the Troy Celtics (which could really be considered the spiritual successors of the Original Celtics franchise under a different location and name) on December 19, 1939, with the merged franchises foolishly continuing under the Troy Haymakers' 3–9 record instead of the Kingston Colonials' 8–4 record (likely because of the decision to have the merged franchise continue playing in Troy, New York instead of continuing to play and operate nearby Kingston, New York).
^{c} Both the previous ABL champion Jersey Reds and the defending ABL champion New York Jewels would merge operations on January 26, 1940, to remain as the New York Jewels for the rest of the season, with the Jewels franchise continuing on with the same win-loss record that they had before the merger occurred (with that record remaining intact as if nothing had happened with them due to them being the surviving team within the merger while the Jersey Reds effectively folded operations with a 7–14 record this season) while also making sure the Jewels franchise survived operations for at least another season.
^{d} The (original) Wilkes-Barre Barons ABL franchise dropped out of the league before officially finishing their season with the ABL on February 2, 1940, with the Barons leaving the league with the worst record of the entire league that season at 5–17.
^{e} Game was played in Coatesville, Pennsylvania.
