= 1945–46 Philadelphia Sphas season =

American basketball team season

- Conference champions
- League: American Basketball League (revived original)
- Head coach: Eddie Gottlieb
- General manager: Eddie Gottlieb
- Owner(s): Eddie Gottlieb
- Arena: Broadwood Hotel

Results
- Record: 21–13 (.618)
- Place: Conference: T–1st
- Playoff finish: Lost ABL championship 3–1 to the Baltimore Bullets

The Philadelphia Sphas were an early, historical example of an American professional basketball team. The 1945–46 season was the thirteenth season played in the now-revived American Basketball League by the Sphas, although they did play in the original rendition of the ABL from 1926 to 1928 as the Philadelphia Warriors, which had no relation to the later BAA franchise of the same name that now exists in the present day as the Golden State Warriors in the NBA. As such, when including the past history of the original ABL with the revived version of the ABL in 1933 following historical problems that related to the Great Depression near the end of 1931, this would technically be the nineteenth official season played by the original ABL properly, though this would officially be the 29th season of play for the Sphas franchise when including previous seasons where they played under names like the "Philadelphia YMHA"; the "Philadelphia Passon, Gottlieb, Black", the "Philadelphia Warriors"; and the "Philadelphia Hebrews". For most historic basketball outlets, this season would also be seen as the final season where the Philadelphia Sphas would be playing in a major professional basketball league, even though the ABL's reputation as such a league wouldn't be seen as dramatically downgraded in that regard until the season after the following one at hand, as the Sphas would continue playing in the ABL up until 1949 long after its reputation as a professional basketball league would be on the decline between the continuing success of the rivaling National Basketball League and the incoming future success of a new rivaling professional basketball league to go up against them both on a national level in the Basketball Association of America.

== Background ==
The Sphas played in leagues around Philadelphia since 1917, but game-by-game records before the Sphas rejoined the ABL in 1933 are not (currently) available (at least, not to the general public if official game records did exist for the Sphas) and are therefore likely lost to time itself.

Initially, when this season began following the conclusion of World War II, there was hope within the ABL that they would be able to have some solid expansion into being a competitive major basketball league similar to that of the rivaling National Basketball League in their future seasons of play. As such, when trying to have their third repeat for what would have been their eighth ABL championship in thirteen overall seasons of play (like it would be any other season for them at this point in time in the ABL), the Sphas would end up tying with the (original) Baltimore Bullets franchise for first place in the entire league with a 21–13 record, with them securing the tie with a 70–46 win over the Bullets at the initial end of the regular season. Despite the previous game giving them momentum to secure first place entirely in the first place tiebreaker match to unofficially end the regular season, the Sphas would end up losing their home court match with a 63–61 defeat to get the #2 seed in the ABL instead. Even with that in mind, however, the Sphas would end up sweeping the #4 seeded Wilmington Bombers in a 2–0 route in the semifinal round before seeing the #1 seeded Bullets once again in the now-best-of-five championship series for the ABL after Baltimore had swept the New York Gothams themselves. Both teams would end up splitting their first two games in the series without blowout victories on their ends before the Bullets ended up routing the Sphas in the final two games of the championship series to win the ABL's championship series 3–1, which gave Baltimore their first (and officially only) ABL championship before they later transferred themselves into the upcoming Basketball Association of America (and later win a championship there) while the Sphas would be denied their eighth ABL championship in the franchise's history. Not only that, but that season would later be seen as the turning point for the rest of their existence going forward, with this season ultimately marking the end of the best days for both the Philadelphia Sphas themselves and the ABL itself going forward.

== Roster ==
Due to information on American Basketball League players being generally hard to find, there are bound to be more gaps and/or inaccuracies found in certain areas on the team's roster spots than usual.

1945–46 Philadelphia Sphas roster
Players

| Pos. | No. | Player | Height | Weight | DOB | From |
|---|---|---|---|---|---|---|
| F/C | | Irv Davis | 6 ft 2 in (1.88 m) | 195 lb (88 kg) | 1915–01–10 | NYU |
| G | | Jerry Fleishman | 6 ft 2 in (1.88 m) | 190 lb (86 kg) | 1922–02–14 | NYU |
| G | | Jack Garfinkel | 6 ft 0 in (1.83 m) | 190 lb (86 kg) | 1918–06–13 | St. John's |
| C | | Art Hillhouse | 6 ft 7 in (2.01 m) | 220 lb (100 kg) | 1916–06–12 | Long Island |
| G/F | | Ralph Kaplowitz | 6 ft 2 in (1.88 m) | 170 lb (77 kg) | 1919–05–18 | NYU |
| G | | Julius Kasner | 5 ft 11 in (1.80 m) | 170 lb (77 kg) | 1915–01–10 | Brooklyn |
| G | | Red Klotz | 5 ft 7 in (1.70 m) | 150 lb (68 kg) | 1920–10–21 | Villanova |
| F/C | | Inky Lautman | 6 ft 2 in (1.88 m) | 205 lb (93 kg) | 1914–05–22 | Central HS (PA) |
| G | | Bernard Opper | 6 ft 0 in (1.83 m) | 185 lb (84 kg) | 1915–09–01 | Kentucky |
| G | | Petey Rosenberg | 5 ft 10 in (1.78 m) | 165 lb (75 kg) | 1918–04–07 | Saint Joseph's |
| C | | Irv Rothenberg | 6 ft 7 in (2.01 m) | 215 lb (98 kg) | 1921–12–31 | Long Island |
| G/F | | Ossie Schectman | 6 ft 0 in (1.83 m) | 175 lb (79 kg) | 1919–03–30 | Long Island |
| G/F | | Butch Schwartz | 6 ft 2 in (1.88 m) | 190 lb (86 kg) | 1919–02–14 | Long Island |
| G | | George Senesky | 6 ft 2 in (1.88 m) | 179 lb (81 kg) | 1922–04–04 | Saint Joseph's |
| F | | Irv Torgoff | 6 ft 2 in (1.88 m) | 192 lb (87 kg) | 1917–03–06 | Long Island |
| G | | Butch Weintraub | 5 ft 11 in (1.80 m) | 190 lb (86 kg) | 1917–10–08 | CCNY |

Coaches
Head coach
- Eddie Gottlieb

Legend
- (DP) Unsigned draft pick
- (FA) Free agent
- (S) Suspended
- Injured

Note: Jack Garfinkel, Julius Kasner, Irv Rothenberg, George Senesky, and Butch Weintraub would not take part in the 1946 ABL Playoffs for the Sphas for one reason or another.

== ABL Standings ==
| Pos. | Team | Wins | Losses | Win % |
|---|---|---|---|---|
| T–1 | Baltimore Bullets | 21 | 13 | .618 |
| T–1 | Philadelphia SPHAs | 21 | 13 | .618 |
| 3 | New York Gothams | 18 | 16 | .529 |
| 4 | Wilmington Bombers | 15 | 19 | .441 |
| 5 | Trenton Tigers | 14 | 20 | .412 |
| 6 | Paterson Crescents | 13 | 21 | .382 |

== ABL Schedule ==
For the rest of the ABL's entire existence going forward, the ABL would utilize a proper, full regular season instead of two half-seasons for its regular season formatting.

=== ABL Regular Season ===
| Game | Date | Opponent | Score | Record |
| 1 | November 3 | Paterson Crescents | 63–55 | 1–0 |
| 2 | November 17 | Trenton Tigers | 60–56 | 2–0 |
| 3 | November 18 | @ New York Gothams | 68–65 | 3–0 |
| 4 | November 25 | @ Trenton Tigers | 47–53 | 3–1 |
| 5 | December 1 | New York Gothams | 50–48 | 4–1 |
| 6 | December 7 | @ Baltimore Bullets | 62–72 | 4–2 |
| 7 | December 8 | Baltimore Bullets | 62–66 | 4–3 |
| 8 | December 9 | @ Wilmington Bombers | 49–55 | 4–4 |
| 9 | December 15 | Paterson Crescents | 76–66 | 5–4 |
| 10 | December 16 | @ Paterson Crescents | 53–40 | 6–4 |
| 11 | December 22 | Wilmington Bombers | 48–57 | 6–5 |
| 12 | December 23 | @ New York Gothams | 59–54 | 7–5 |
| 13 | December 29 | Trenton Tigers | 86–61 | 8–5 |
| 14 | December 30 | @ Trenton Tigers | 62–58 | 9–5 |
| 15 | January 5 | New York Gothams | 60–59 | 10–5 |
| 16 | January 11 | @ Baltimore Bullets | 61–67 | 10–6 |
| 17 | January 12 | Baltimore Bullets | 61–56 | 11–6 |
| 18 | January 13 | @ Wilmington Bombers | 47–40 | 12–6 |
| 19 | January 19 | Paterson Crescents | 59–52 | 13–6 |
| 20 | January 20 | @ Paterson Crescents | 57–53 | 14–6 |
| 21 | January 26 | Wilmington Bombers | 72–60 | 15–6 |
| 22 | January 27 | @ New York Gothams | 61–75 | 15–7 |
| 23 | February 1 | @ Baltimore Bullets | 56–65 | 15–8 |
| 24 | February 2 | Baltimore Bullets | 55–57 | 15–9 |
| 25 | February 9 | New York Gothams | 53–60 | 15–10 |
| 26 | February 16 | Wilmington Bombers | 70–58 | 16–10 |
| 27 | February 17 | @ Wilmington Bombers | 43–58 | 16–11 |
| 28 | February 23 | Baltimore Bullets | 68–47 | 17–11 |
| 29 | February 24 | @ Trenton Tigers | 48–63 | 17–12 |
| 30 | March 2 | Wilmington Bombers | 70–61 | 18–12 |
| 31 | March 3 | @ Paterson Crescents | 74–73 (OT) | 19–12 |
| 32 | March 9 | Trenton Tigers | 72–69 | 20–12 |
| 33 | March 10 | @ Wilmington Bombers | 58–62 | 20–13 |
| 34 | March 13 | @ Baltimore Bullets | 70–46 | 21–13 |
| 35 (T) | March 16 | Baltimore Bullets | 61–63 | 21–14 |

=== ABL Playoffs ===
==== ABL Semifinals ====
| Game | Date | Opponent | Score | Record |
| Game 1 | March 17 | @ Wilmington Bombers | 69–65 | 1–0 |
| Game 2 | March 23 | Wilmington Bombers | 75–72 | 2–0 |

==== ABL Championship Series ====
This would end up becoming the last ABL Championship Series the Philadelphia Sphas would ever (officially) participate in. This series would also end up becoming a best-of-five series this time around after last season's championship series against the (original) Baltimore Bullets franchise was a best-of-three series for some unknown reason.

| # | Date | Opponent | Score | Record |
| Game 1 | March 30 | Baltimore Bullets | 63–48 | 1–0 |
| Game 2 | March 31 | @ Baltimore Bullets | 48–65 | 1–1 |
| Game 3 | April 13 | Baltimore Bullets | 45–68 | 1–2 |
| Game 4 | April 14 | @ Baltimore Bullets | 39–54 | 1–3 |

Philadelphia also played a match at Schenectady, New York on April 11, 1946 in-between Games 2 and 3 due to them playing a national professional invitational tournament there, with that game being considered a consolation prize round there. The game in question would end up going into overtime, but it ended with the Philadelphia Sphas losing 61–58 to the (original) Baltimore Bullets franchise in an unrelated tournament match that went to overtime.

== Awards and honors ==
By the end of the season, Art Hillhouse would end up being the leading scorer of the entire league for the thirteenth season of its return and its nineteenth overall season of its existence with 423 points scored for an average of 12.4 points per game.
