= 1928–29 Philadelphia Sphas season =

American basketball team season

- League: Philadelphia Basket Ball League
- Head coach: Eddie Gottlieb
- General manager: Eddie Gottlieb
- Owner(s): Eddie Gottlieb; Harry Passon; Edwin "Hughie" Black
- Arena: Philadelphia Arena (original)

Results
- Record: 0–5 (.000)
- Place: Conference: 5th (first half)
- Playoff finish: Left the Philadelphia Basket Ball League in the first half of the season to become independent.

The 1928–29 season was the second and final season played by the Philadelphia Sphas while operating in the Philadelphia Basket Ball League, which was a league that the Sphas previously played in a few seasons ago (though it would be their eleventh overall season of play when including seasons played as the Philadelphia YMCA, the Philadelphia Passon, Gottlieb, Black, and the original Philadelphia Warriors franchises (and unofficially, the Philadelphia Quakers / Phillies franchise during their first season in the ABL)). Due to the Philadelphia Sphas returning to one of their previous league roots in a completely restructured Philadelphia Basket Ball League, the Sphas would stop using the original Philadelphia Warriors name to play in the original American Basketball League that was a major, (planned to be) nationwide professional basketball league and returned to the Sphas name they used for most of their history for the newly revived, regional Philadelphia Basket Ball League that had turned into a minor basketball league by comparison. With that being said, game-by-game records are (currently) not available for this season and are therefore likely lost to time in the process.

Similar to the Sphas' first season of play in the Philadelphia Basket Ball League and their only season of play in the Eastern League, the Sphas' second and final season in the Philadelphia Basket Ball League would become an absolute mess for the team, to the point where the Sphas ended up having to drop out of the league after a few games played in the first half of the season on December 15, 1928. The first half of that season ended with them having a winless first half through a 0–5 record before dropping out of the league that date entirely for the second half of that season going forward. This would be considered the only season where the Sphas would decide to play independently instead of playing in a basketball league for the majority of their season, hence the Sphas returning to their "Wandering Jews" roots once again this season. (The Philadelphia Basket Ball League would later see some completely different teams joining in the league to replace the Sphas for the second half of this season. Weirdly enough, multiple franchises there in Pattison, Manayunk, and later Germantown did not have official team names for their locations this season, though one can infer them to potentially be team names in Philadelphia instead.) Due to the status of the Philadelphia Basket Ball by this point in time, that league would technically be covered by other sporting outlets this season, but only as a minor basketball league instead of as a major professional basketball league similar to its inaugural season a few seasons prior to this one.

== Philadelphia Basket Ball League Standings ==
First Half
Team	Wins	Losses	Winning %
Philadelphia Elks	7	1	.875
Pattison	4	3	.571
Philadelphia Quartermaster	4	4	.500
Manayunk	2	4	.333
Philadelphia SPHAs†	0	5	.000

† – Withdrew from the Philadelphia Basket Ball League on December 15, 1928.

Second Half
Team	Wins	Losses	Winning %
Pattison^{×}	10	4	.714
Philadelphia Elks	10	8	.556
Philadelphia Quartermaster	10	9	.526
Germantown	9	10	.474
Downington Moose	9	11	.450
Manayunk	8	13	.381

^{×} – Was expelled from the Philadelphia Basket Ball League on February 19, 1929 (thus turning the first place record in the division into a disqualification during that time instead) due to them using ineligible players during the second half of the season. As such, the Philadelphia Elks were considered the official league champions by default following Pattison's expulsion from the league there.

The second half of the season would showcase the Germantown and Downington Moose franchises being replacements for the Philadelphia Sphas within the second half of the season.
