= 1921–22 Philadelphia Sphas season =

American basketball team season

1921–22 Philadelphia Passon, Gottlieb, Black season
- League: American League of Philadelphia
- Head coach: Eddie Gottlieb
- General manager: Eddie Gottlieb
- Owner(s): P.B.G. Sporting Goods; Harry Passon; Eddie Gottlieb; Edwin "Hughie" Black

Results
- Record: 8–2 (.800)
- Place: Conference: 1st (1st half) T-3rd (2nd half)
- Playoff finish: No playoffs in ALP (League disbanded during the second half of the season.)

The 1921–22 season was the fifth and final season the Philadelphia Sphas played in while operating within the American League of Philadelphia, as the league disbanded before their final schedule for the season was completed. The team was referred to as the Philadelphia Passon, Gottlieb, Black (which were the three respective team founders' last names (all of whom would play with the original Sphas franchise) in Harry Passon, Eddie Gottlieb, and Edwin "Hughie" Black for the P.B.G. Sporting Goods store) in league records for this season. Game-by-game records are (currently) not available for this season and are therefore likely lost to time in the process. For this season, the team known as "Passon, Gottlieb, Black" this time around would finish the first half of their season with a first place finish with a 6–1 record, while the shortened up second half of the season that caused the minor league's official demise this season ended with the team getting a 2–1 record for a tied third place (kind of) finish with the 20th Century franchise that had them both being behind only the Alpha and Broadway franchises there. However, if one were to combine the records of their first half and their shortened up second half together, then the franchise known as "Passon, Gottlieb, Black" this season would technically end up being considered the (unofficial) champions of that league's final season due to them having an 8–2 record, which would be the best record of that final, shortened up season in the American League of Philadelphia (officially being one game ahead of the 20th Century franchise, who were officially in second place at the time of the first half of the season's conclusion).

Like most other seasons of the American League of Philadelphia before this season ended prematurely for that league that the Sphas competed in for the last time, this season would not see any proper coverage by any sports outlets before it met its premature demise.

== American League of Philadelphia Standings ==
First Half
| Team | Wins | Losses | Winning % |
|---|---|---|---|
| Philadelphia Passon, Gottlieb, Black | 6 | 1 | .857 |
| Philadelphia 20th Century | 5 | 2 | .714 |
| Philadelphia Holy Name | 4 | 2 | .667 |
| Philadelphia American Independence | 4 | 2 | .667 |
| Philadelphia Alpha | 2 | 4 | .333 |
| Philadelphia Broadway | 2 | 4 | .333 |
| Philadelphia Merrill | 1 | 5 | .167 |
| Philadelphia East Gnt. | 1 | 5 | .167 |

Second Half
| Team | Wins | Losses | Winning % |
|---|---|---|---|
| Philadelphia Broadway | 4 | 0 | 1.000 |
| Philadelphia Alpha | 3 | 1 | .750 |
| Philadelphia Passon, Gottlieb, Black | 2 | 1 | .667 |
| Philadelphia 20th Century | 2 | 1 | .667 |
| Philadelphia American Independence | 1 | 2 | .333 |
| Philadelphia Holy Name | 1 | 3 | .250 |
| Philadelphia Corley C.C. | 1 | 3 | .250 |
| Philadelphia East Gnt. | 0 | 3 | .000 |

== Failed American League of Philadelphia Championship Series ==
Normally, early basketball leagues like the American League of Philadelphia would pit the two best teams of each half-season of play into a championship series of sorts to determine the overall league winner for the season, with the Sphas technically qualifying for that mark this time around due to them winning the first half of the season. However, due to the American League of Philadelphia folding operations during the second half of the season, no official champion would be proclaimed for them this season. However, if one were to be declared, the Philadelphia Sphas would reasonably be seen as the unofficial champions of the league during their final season of existence there.
