= 1918–19 Philadelphia Sphas season =

Basketball season of the Philadelphia Sphas

- League: American League of Philadelphia
- Head coach: Eddie Gottlieb
- General manager: Eddie Gottlieb
- Owner(s): Southern Philadelphia Hebrew Association; Eddie Gottlieb; Edwin "Hughie" Black; Harry Passon

Results
- Record: 6–8 (.429)
- Place: Conference: 5th (first half), T-4th (second half; four-way tie), 5th (overall)
- Playoff finish: No playoffs in ALP

The 1918–19 season was the first season played by the team as the Philadelphia Sphas properly (they completed their previous season while playing as the Philadelphia YMHA due to the team originally being a part of their local Young Men's Hebrew Association before the local Y.M.H.A. backed out of their involvement with the team (though they still provided the team's uniforms for this season and the following season afterward), resulting in the team's ownership fully going out to Edwin "Hughie" Black, Harry Passon, and team general manager/head coach Eddie Gottlieb by this point in time alongside their first official collaboration with the South Philadelphia Hebrew Association (hence the SPHAs name)), and the team's second season in the minor-league American League of Philadelphia, as well as their second overall season of existence as a franchise. Game-by-game records are (currently) not available for this season and are therefore likely lost to time in the process. In any case, the American League of Philadelphia would cut their season in two halves this time around, with their final results being determined by the overall results from the two halves later on. In this season's case, however, the Sphas would end up finishing this season with a 6–8 overall record for fifth place, with both of the season's halves resulting in the Sphas getting a 3–4 record for a fifth place finish either way (though the second half of their season would have them be involved in a four-way tie for fourth place with the Dobson, Yours Truly, and Victrix C.C. franchises).

Due to the combination of World War I and the Spanish flu pandemic (the latter of which still remains (likely speaking) as the deadliest pandemic in human history), the American League of Philadelphia that the Sphas played in would be considered the only basketball league that would actually play the sport of basketball in general for either major league or minor league play during this season.

== Roster ==
The players that made up the roster for the inaugural Philadelphia Sphas roster (in terms of the roster that actually used that team name and not the Philadelphia YMHA name from the previous season) included Edwin "Hughie" Black, Mark "Mockie" Bunin, Eddie Gottlieb, Charlie Newman, Harry Passon, Herman "Chickie" Passon, Lou Schneiderman, and (presumably) Bob Seitchick.

== American League of Philadelphia Standings ==
First Half
Team	Wins	Losses	Win %
Philadelphia Yours Truly*	7	1	.875
Philadelphia Hancock*	6	2	.750
Philadelphia St. Columba	5	2	.714
Philadelphia Dobson	5	2	.714
Philadelphia SPHAs	3	4	.429
Philadelphia Victrix C.C.	2	5	.286
Philadelphia Midvale	1	6	.143
Philadelphia Naval Aircraft Wilbar	0	7	.000

Second Half
Team	Wins	Losses	Win %
Philadelphia St. Columba	7	0	1.000
Philadelphia Hancock	5	2	.714
Philadelphia Midvale	4	3	.571
Philadelphia Dobson	3	4	.429
Philadelphia SPHAs	3	4	.429
Philadelphia Yours Truly	3	4	.429
Philadelphia Victrix C.C.	3	4	.429
Philadelphia Naval Aircraft Wilbar	0	7	.000

Overall Records
Team	Wins	Losses	Win %
Philadelphia St. Columba	12	2	.857
Philadelphia Hancock*	11	4	.733
Philadelphia Yours Truly*	10	5	.667
Philadelphia Dobson	8	6	.571
Philadelphia SPHAs	6	8	.429
Philadelphia Midvale	5	9	.357
Philadelphia Victrix C.C.	5	9	.357
Philadelphia Naval Aircraft Wilbar	0	14	.000

* – Both the Hancock and the Yours Truly franchises played one extra game in the first half of the season to determine the champion of the first half of the season through tiebreaker stipulations there. As such, both of those franchises played an extra game against each other this season.
