= 1922–23 Philadelphia Sphas season =

American basketball team season

1922–23 Philadelphia Passon, Gottlieb, Black season
- League: Manufacturer's League
- Head coach: Eddie Gottlieb & Harry Passon
- General manager: Eddie Gottlieb
- Owner(s): P.B.G. Sporting Goods; Harry Passon; Eddie Gottlieb; Edwin "Hughie" Black
- Arena: New Auditorium Hall

Results
- Record: 8–6 (.571)
- Place: Conference: T-2nd (1st half), T-4th (2nd half, three-way tie)
- Playoff finish: No playoffs in Manufacturer's League

1922–23 Philadelphia Sphas season
- League: Philadelphia League
- Head coach: Eddie Gottlieb & Harry Passon
- General manager: Eddie Gottlieb
- Owner(s): P.B.G. Sporting Goods; Harry Passon; Eddie Gottlieb; Edwin "Hughie" Black
- Arena: New Auditorium Hall

Results
- Record: 8–11 (.421)
- Place: Conference: 2nd (1st half) 6th (2nd half)
- Playoff finish: Did not qualify for championship series

The 1922–23 season was the first season played by the Philadelphia Sphas in the Philadelphia League (sixth overall season for the team), and the only season played by the team while in the Manufacturer's League. In the Manufacturer's League, the league was made up of teams from local industries, though the Sphas were known as Philadelphia Passon, Gottlieb, Black (which were the three respective team founders' last names (all of whom would play with the original Sphas franchise) in Harry Passon, Eddie Gottlieb, and Edwin "Hughie" Black for the P.B.G. Sporting Goods store) because they were competing on behalf of the owners' sporting goods store. While playing in the Philadelphia League, though, the team was known as the Sphas properly. Game-by-game records are (currently) not available for this season and are therefore likely lost to time in the process. Furthermore, coverage for the Manufacturer's League that the "Passon, Gottlieb, Black" team competed in would not be covered properly by most sports outlets, though the Philadelphia League that the Sphas themselves competed in would interestingly be covered by some outlets as a major basketball league, over that of even the original Pennsylvania State Basketball League at the time.

During this season, this franchise would have better results shown throughout the first half of both of their seasons in their respective leagues than they did in the second half of their seasons in their respective leagues. While playing under the "Passon, Gottlieb, Black" name, the franchise would end the first half of their only season in the Manufacturer's League with a tie for second place with the M&H Sporting Goods franchise for a 5–2 first half finish behind only the Keystone Telephone franchise, but their second half would see them tie for fourth place alongside the National Metal Edge and Keystone Telephone franchises with a below-average 3–4 record that had them finish above only the Steel Heddle franchise there. This would mean that the "Passon, Gottlieb, Black" franchise would finish their only season there with an above-average 8–6 overall record to tie with the Keystone Telephone franchise for a (likely) fourth place overall finish there. As for the Sphas in the Philadelphia League, their first season there would see them with another second place finish, this time with a 7–3 record that was behind only the Cathedral franchise, but their second half would see the Sphas finish the season with a dead last 1–8 record there. This downgrade in production would see the Sphas finish their overall season in the Philadelphia League with a below-average 8–11 record, dropping their overall standing results from second place to around fourth place ahead of only the Holy Name and St. Peter's franchises. Not only that, but the Sphas would also fail to qualify for the Philadelphia League's playoffs (which really was just the champions of each half-season competing against each other in the championship series) in the process, with that league's season ending with the Philadelphia Cathedral team sweeping the Philadelphia St. Peter's team in a 2–0 championship series.

== Roster ==
Due to information on older (professional) basketball leagues being generally hard (if not outright impossible these days) to find for players from leagues like the Manufacturer's League (for the Philadelphia Passon, Gottlieb, Black team that they were known by at the time) or the Philadelphia League (for the Philadelphia Sphas team properly), there are bound to be more gaps and/or inaccuracies found in certain areas on the team's roster spots than usual. So much so, in fact, that it's possible that there still might be players missing from the possible due to them playing only for the team while under the Philadelphia Passon, Gottlieb, Black team under the Manufacturer's League this season instead of out in the Philadelphia League this season while playing for the Philadelphia Sphas properly (such as Herman "Chickie" Passon, for example) since the only link that covered the roster for this season properly at this time was covering the team's time in the Philadelphia League specifically and not necessarily their time spent in the Manufacturer's League.

1922–23 Philadelphia Sphas / Passon, Gottlieb, Black roster
Players

Pos.	No.	Player	Height	Weight	DOB	From
G		Hughie Black	5 ft 6 in (1.68 m)	155 lb (70 kg)	1897–12–09	South Philadelphia HS (PA)
C		Richie Deighan	6 ft 3 in (1.91 m)	195 lb (88 kg)	1900–02–03	No college
G		Eddie Gottlieb	5 ft 7 in (1.70 m)	165 lb (75 kg)	1898–09–15	Pennsylvania School of Pedagogy
C		Babe Klotz	6 ft 2 in (1.88 m)	200 lb (91 kg)	1900–10–23	Girard College
C		Stretch Meehan	6 ft 7 in (2.01 m)	220 lb (100 kg)	1897-04-17	Seton Hall
G		Charley Newman			Unknown	No college
G		Doc Newman	5 ft 9 in (1.75 m)	170 lb (77 kg)	1890–02–03	No college
G		Lou Schneiderman	5 ft 8 in (1.73 m)	150 lb (68 kg)	1899–01–10	No college
G/F		Lou Sugarman	5 ft 7 in (1.70 m)	145 lb (66 kg)	1889–10–10	Notre Dame
G/F		Charley Swartz	5 ft 10 in (1.78 m)		Unknown	No college

Coaches
Head coach
- Eddie Gottlieb
- Harry Passon

Legend
- (DP) Unsigned draft pick
- (FA) Free agent
- (S) Suspended
- Injured

In addition to these players, there was also a center with the last name of Davis and a center with the last name of Richie that were also on the team briefly (for one game each) as well, at least during their time spent in the Philadelphia League while playing as the Philadelphia Sphas properly.

== Team standings ==
=== Manufacturer's League Standings ===
First Half—Manufacturer's League
Team	Won	Lost	Winning %
Philadelphia Keystone Telephone	6	1	.857
Philadelphia M&H Sporting Goods	5	2	,714
Philadelphia Passon, Gottlieb, Black	5	2	.714
Philadelphia H.O. Wilbur	4	3	.571
Philadelphia Colonial Ice Cream	3	4	.429
Philadelphia Overbrook Carpet	2	5	.286
Philadelphia National Metal Edge	2	6	.250
Philadelphia Steel Heddle	1	6	.143

Second Half—Manufacturer's League
Team	Won	Lost	Winning %
Philadelphia Colonial Ice Cream	7	0	1.000
Philadelphia H.O. Wilbur	5	2	.714
Philadelphia M&H Sporting Goods	5	2	.714
Philadelphia Keystone Telephone	3	4	.429
Philadelphia National Metal Edge	3	4	.429
Philadelphia Passon, Gottlieb, Black	3	4	.429
Philadelphia Steel Heddle	1	6	.143

=== Philadelphia League Standings ===
First Half—Philadelphia League
Team	Won	Lost	Winning %
Philadelphia Cathedral	8	2	.800
Philadelphia SPHAs	7	3	.700
Philadelphia St. Henry	6	4	.600
Philadelphia St. Peter's	3	6	.333
Philadelphia Tri-Council Caseys	3	7	.300
Philadelphia Holy Name	2	7	.222

Second Half—Philadelphia League
Team	Won	Lost	Winning %
Philadelphia St. Henry	9	2	.818
Philadelphia Tri-Council Caseys	8	3	.727
Philadelphia Cathedral	5	5	.500
Philadelphia St. Peter's	4	6	.400
Philadelphia Holy Name	3	6	.333
Philadelphia SPHAs	1	8	.111
