= 1926–27 Philadelphia Sphas season =

American basketball team season

1926–27 Philadelphia Quakers / Warriors season
- League: American Basketball League (original)
- Head coach: Eddie Gottlieb & Harry Passon
- General manager: Eddie Gottlieb
- Owner(s): Jules Aronson; Max Hoff; Eddie Gottlieb; Harry Passon; Edwin "Hughie" Black
- Arena: Philadelphia Arena (original)

Results
- Record: 24–18 (.571)
- Place: Conference: 3rd (first half as Quakers), 4th (second half as Warriors)
- Playoff finish: Did not qualify

The 1926–27 season was the first season played by the Philadelphia Sphas while operating in what what would be later known as the original American Basketball League, the first ever attempt at a genuinely regional, major professional league (though it would be their tenth overall season of play when including seasons played as the Philadelphia YMCA and the Philadelphia Passon, Gottlieb, Black franchises). This season saw the Philadelphia Sphas originally perform as an independent team this season (though unofficially held the record of the Philadelphia Quakers (sometimes referred to as the Phillies) during the first half of the ABL's second ever season of play) before they entered the ABL as a replacement of the Quakers franchise while playing as the Philadelphia Warriors after previously performing well against teams like the New York Renaissance and the Original Celtics in an independent manner. When competing in the ABL for the first time, the Philadelphia franchise would look to gain the original ABL's second ever championship after the Cleveland Rosenblums won that league's first ever championship during the previous season. However, if you exclude the Philadelphia Quakers' first half of the season as a part of the Sphas' overall record, the Philadelphia Warriors would play in only 21 total games this season in the ABL instead of the overall 42 games for the season within the ABL for Philadelphia when combining both the Quakers and Warriors franchises this season. Even so, despite the original American Basketball League being more well-known as a professional basketball league than the rest of the basketball leagues that the Philadelphia Sphas franchise played in during the past decade, game-by-game records are (currently) not available for this season, though the games played this season could be more likely to eventually be found for the general public to see this season when compared to most of the other basketball leagues they played in their past history.

During the first half of the ABL's second season of existence, the Philadelphia Sphas weren't officially a part of that league, with them opting to compete independently this season while a different team in the Philadelphia Quakers competed in the ABL under the Sphas' support. Despite the Quakers finishing the first half of the season with an above-average 14–7 record for a third place finish behind only the Cleveland Rosenblums and the Washington Palace Five / Laundrymen, they would end up dropping out of the ABL's second half of the season and were replaced by the Sphas properly under the new moniker they came up with in the original Philadelphia Warriors franchise that would eventually be reused in the future for the BAA/NBA franchise of that same name. However, while playing as the Philadelphia Warriors in the ABL for the second half of the season, the Warriors would end the second of that season with a below-average 10–11 record for a fourth place finish behind the only winning teams from that half of the season in the Brooklyn Celtics (who were actually the Original Celtics franchise competing under the Brooklyn Celtics name after the original Brooklyn Arcadians transferred their position and team rights to the Original Celtics earlier in the first half of the season), the Fort Wayne Hoosiers, and the Washington Palace Five / Laundrymen franchises. Because the Philadelphia franchise(s) didn't win either the first half or the second half of the season (which were won by the inaugural ABL champion Cleveland Rosenblums and the Original Celtics under the Brooklyn Celtics name, the latter of whom won the second championship series with a 3–0 sweep), the Sphas under the Warriors name would not qualify for the championship playoff series the ABL held this season. Due to the status of the original American Basketball League name, this season would see a lot more coverage than previous seasons the Philadelphia franchise had to deal with during their early history.

== Roster ==
Due to information on American Basketball League players being generally hard to find, there are bound to be more gaps and/or inaccuracies found in certain areas on the team's roster spots than usual.

1926–27 Philadelphia Quakers / Warriors roster
Players

Pos.	No.	Player	Height	Weight	DOB	From
G/F		Babe Artus	6 ft 0 in (1.83 m)	200 lb (91 kg)	1898-03-20	No college
G/F		Thomas Barlow	6 ft 1 in (1.85 m)	195 lb (88 kg)	1896-07-09	Drexel
G/F		Soup Campbell	5 ft 9 in (1.75 m)	160 lb (73 kg)	1897-12-24	No college
F/C		Neil Deighan	6 ft 4 in (1.93 m)	190 lb (86 kg)	1892-07-07	No college
F/C		Eddie Dolin	6 ft 2 in (1.88 m)	185 lb (84 kg)	1892-08-01	Washington & Jefferson
G/F		Al Kellett	6 ft 1 in (1.85 m)	195 lb (88 kg)	1901-10-30	Columbia
G		Charles Lester	5 ft 4 in (1.63 m)	140 lb (64 kg)	1904-12-04	No college
G		Danny McNichol	5 ft 10 in (1.78 m)	175 lb (79 kg)	1898-10-12	Penn
C		Stretch Meehan	6 ft 7 in (2.01 m)	220 lb (100 kg)	1897-04-17	Seton Hall
G		Chickie Passon	5 ft 7 in (1.70 m)	165 lb (75 kg)	1900-05-30	Penn
G		Harry Passon	5 ft 8 in (1.73 m)	175 lb (79 kg)	1897-04-01	South Philadelphia HS (PA)?
G		Harry Riconda	5 ft 10 in (1.78 m)	175 lb (79 kg)	1897-03-17	Newtown HS (NY)
G/F		Lou Schneiderman	5 ft 8 in (1.73 m)	150 lb (68 kg)	1899-01-10	Central HS (PA)
G/F		John Schrey	6 ft 0 in (1.83 m)	175 lb (79 kg)	1906-12-18	No college
F/C		Reds Sherr	6 ft 2 in (1.88 m)	210 lb (95 kg)	1905-02-02	Penn
G		Hank Thomas	5 ft 10 in (1.78 m)	160 lb (73 kg)	1896-07-08	No college

Coaches
Head coach

Eddie Gottlieb
Harry Passon

Legend
- (DP) Unsigned draft pick
- (FA) Free agent
- (S) Suspended
- Injured

Roster

== American Basketball League Standings ==
First Half
Team	Wins	Losses	Winning %
Cleveland Rosenblums	17	4	.810
Washington Palace Five / Laundrymen	16	5	.762
Philadelphia Quakers / Phillies*	14	7	.667
Brooklyn Arcadians / Brooklyn Celtics**	13	8	.619
Fort Wayne Hoosiers	8	13	.381
Rochester Centrals	8	13	.381
Chicago Bruins	7	14	.333
Baltimore Orioles	1	20	.048
Detroit Pulaski Post Five / Pulaski / Lions†	0	6	.000

* – The Philadelphia SPHAs would replace the Philadelphia Quakers / Phillies (who was the original team playing for the first half of the ABL season) during the second half of the season, albeit while playing under the original Philadelphia Warriors name instead.
** – After playing only in five total games this season (all of which ended in defeats), the Brooklyn Arcadians would have their franchise rights become both transferred and replaced by the Original Celtics franchise under the temporarily implemented name of the Brooklyn Celtics for the rest of this season in the ABL.
† – Withdrew from the ABL after playing only six total games during the first half of this season.

Second Half
Team	Wins	Losses	Winning %
Brooklyn Celtics*	19	2	.905
Fort Wayne Hoosiers	15	6	.714
Washington Palace Five / Laundrymen	14	7	.667
Philadelphia Warriors**	10	11	.476
Cleveland Rosenblums	9	12	.429
Chicago Bruins	6	15	.286
Rochester Centrals	6	15	.286
Baltimore Orioles	5	16	.238

* – After playing only five total games this season (all of which ended in defeats), the Brooklyn Arcadians would have their franchise rights become both transferred and replaced by the Original Celtics franchise under the temporarily implemented name of the Brooklyn Celtics for the rest of this season in the ABL.
** – The Philadelphia SPHAs would replace the Philadelphia Quakers during the second half of the season, albeit while playing under the original Philadelphia Warriors name instead.
