= 1925–26 Philadelphia Sphas season =

American basketball team season

- League: Eastern League
- Head coach: Eddie Gottlieb
- General manager: Eddie Gottlieb
- Owner(s): Eddie Gottlieb; Harry Passon; Edwin "Hughie" Black
- Arena: Broad & Bainbridge Street

Results
- Record: 14–5 (.737)
- Place: Conference: 3rd (first half), 1st (second half)
- Playoff finish: No playoffs were held in the Eastern League.

The 1925–26 season was the only season played by the Philadelphia Sphas while operating in what was known as the short-lived Eastern League (though it would be their ninth overall season of play). This season marked the franchise's second season as the (technically) defending champions of the league due to their prior championships won under the Philadelphia (Basket Ball) League,though they would play in 19 total games this season due to the bonkers way the Eastern League did their season. With that said, game-by-game records are (currently) not available for this season and are therefore likely lost to time in the process. Similar to the team's first season in the Philadelphia Basket Ball League, the Sphas' only season in the Eastern League ended up being a complete mess in terms of results displayed, as the Philadelphia Sphas ended their first half of the season with a third place finish behind only the Trenton Bengals and Reading Bears under a six team league (though it later dropped down to five teams following the departure of the cityside rivaling Philadelphia Cranes), while the second half of the season saw the Sphas get a first place finish with a perfect 6–0 record against a four team league that only had the Pottsville Miners returning for that half against both the newly implemented Philadelphia Quartermaster and the Exile A.C. team joining in for a disheveled Eastern League. While the Eastern League did not hold any sort of playoff formatting, it could be reasonably seen that the Sphas would be the (unofficial) champions of the league that season due to the Trenton Bengals not being able to compete in the Eastern League for the second half of the season.

During the first half of the season, the Eastern League was seen as another major basketball league for the season. However, because the Eastern League saw dramatic changes throughout its only season of play (at least while going under that name), only the first half of the season would have it be seen as a major professional basketball league at the time, as the major differences between the first half and the second half of the season led to some outlets only seeing the second half of the season as something equal to that of a minor basketball league by comparison. This season would also be notable for them promoting exhibition games out to successful, professional basketball teams out in the Metropolitan Basketballl League and the American Basketball League (the latter of which resulted in the Sphas winning five out of six games against, with their only loss being against the inaugural champion Cleveland Rosenblums), as well as setting up an equivalent of championship series match-ups against successful independent teams like the Original Celtics and the all-black New York Renaissance (with the Sphas winning 2–1 against the Celtics and then sweeping 2–0 against the Renaissance). That success in question (with a 9–2 record being held against some of the most successful teams in the nation at the time) would later lead to them being promoted to the biggest professional basketball league of its time in the American Basketball League by the following season.

== Roster ==
Due to information on older (professional) basketball leagues being generally hard (if not outright impossible these days) to find for players from leagues like the Eastern League, there are bound to be more gaps and/or inaccuracies found in certain areas on the team's roster spots than usual.

1925–26 Philadelphia Sphas roster
Players

Pos.	No.	Player	Height	Weight	DOB	From
G/F		Babe Artus	6 ft 0 in (1.83 m)	200 lb (91 kg)	1898–11–20	No college
G/F		Davey Banks	5 ft 7 in (1.70 m)	155 lb (70 kg)	1901–01–04	No college
G/F		Jimmy Dessen			1899	Temple
G/F		Russ Fossett	5 ft 7 in (1.70 m)	140 lb (64 kg)	1897–02–02	Girard College
G/F		Walt Gailey	6 ft 0 in (1.83 m)		1902–10–24	No college
C		Babe Klotz	6 ft 2 in (1.88 m)	200 lb (91 kg)	1900–10–23	Girard College
G/F		Sam Moorehead	6 ft 0 in (1.83 m)	185 lb (84 kg)	1892–10–04	No college
G		Doc Newman	5 ft 9 in (1.75 m)	170 lb (77 kg)	1890–02–03	No college
G/F		Chickie Passon	5 ft 7 in (1.70 m)	165 lb (75 kg)	1900–05–30	Penn
G		Lou Schneiderman	5 ft 8 in (1.73 m)	150 lb (68 kg)	1899–01–10	No college
G/F		Charley Swartz	5 ft 10 in (1.78 m)		Unknown	No college

Coaches
Head coach
- Eddie Gottlieb

Legend
- (DP) Unsigned draft pick
- (FA) Free agent
- (S) Suspended
- Injured

Please note that due to the only known and available website hosting some of the oldest rosters of professional basketball teams only listed the first half of the Eastern League as a professional basketball league and not the second half of the Eastern League for various reasons that related to team structure and competitiveness by that point in time, it's possible that the official roster for the team during this season might still be considered incomplete due to the possibility of there being players on the team only playing on the Philadelphia Sphas for the second half of the season instead of the first half of the season specifically.

== Eastern League Standings ==
First Half
Team	Wins	Losses	Winning %
Trenton (Royal) Bengals	12	4	.750
Reading Bears	12	5	.706
Philadelphia SPHAs	8	6	.571
Philadelphia Cranes†	5	6	.455
Pottsville Miners	3	9	.250
Camden Skeeters	1	11	.083

† – Withdrew from the Eastern League on December 29, 1925 near the end of the first half of the season.

Second Half
Team	Wins	Losses	Winning %
Philadelphia SPHAs	6	0	1.000
Philadelphia Quartermaster	4	2	.667
Pottsville Miners	1	5	.167
Exile A.C.	1	5	.167

The second half of the season would showcase mostly completely new teams when compared to the first half of the season, as only the Philadelphia Sphas and the Pottsville Miners remained from the first half of the season into the second half of the season.

== Failed Eastern League Championship Series ==
Normally, early basketball leagues like the Eastern League would pit the two best teams of each half-season of play into a championship series of sorts to determine the overall league winner for the season, with the Sphas technically qualifying for that mark this time around due to them winning the second half of the season. However, due to the Trenton (Royal) Bengals leaving the Eastern League after the first half of the season ended combined with the Eastern League turning into a mess by the second half of the season, no official champion would be proclaimed for them this season. However, if one were to be declared, the Philadelphia Sphas would reasonably be seen as the unofficial champions of the league during their only season of existence there due to them being the best surviving team throughout both halves of the season.
