= 1919–20 Philadelphia Sphas season =

American basketball team season

- League: American League of Philadelphia
- Head coach: Eddie Gottlieb
- General manager: Eddie Gottlieb
- Owner(s): Southern Philadelphia Hebrew Association; Eddie Gottlieb; Harry Passon; Edwin "Hughie" Black

Results
- Record: 8–6 (.571)
- Place: Conference: T–3rd (1st half) 4th (2nd half)
- Playoff finish: No playoffs in ALP

The 1919–20 season was the Philadelphia Sphas' third season in the American League of Philadelphia and second season as the Sphas (originally called Philadelphia YMHA). Game-by-game records are (currently) not available for this season and are therefore likely lost to time in the process. This was the first season that the Sphas finished with a total record over .500. However, that would occur primarily in the first half of the season, with the Sphas getting a 5–2 record at that time (tying with the Hancock franchise and being behind both the Dobson and Xavier franchises there), as the Sphas finished the second half of the season with a fourth place finish for that half with a 3–4 record there. This season didn't have the American League of Philadelphia combine the two records for an overall final season of results, but if it was there, the Sphas would finish the season with an above-average 8–6 record, which would be good enough for a fourth place finish behind the Dobson, Hancock, and Xavier franchises.

Due to a combination of World War I being over and done with and the Spanish flu pandemic being near its waning point, the American League of Philadelphia that the Sphas competed in would continue to be disregarded as a basketball league by most publications.

== American League of Philadelphia Standings ==
First Half
Team	Won	Lost	Winning %
Philadelphia Dobson	6	1	.857
Philadelphia Xavier	6	1	.857
Philadelphia SPHAs	5	2	.714
Philadelphia Hancock	5	2	.714
Philadelphia St. Columba	2	5	.286
Philadelphia Mt. Carmel	2	5	.286
Philadelphia Girard	2	5	.286
Philadelphia Criterion	0	7	.000

Second Half
Team	Won	Lost	Winning %
Philadelphia Hancock	7	0	1.000
Philadelphia Xavier	6	1	.857
Philadelphia Dobson	3	3	.500
Philadelphia SPHAs	3	4	.429
Philadelphia Criterion	3	4	.429
Philadelphia Mt. Carmel	2	5	.286
Philadelphia Girard	1	5	.167
Philadelphia St. Columba	0	4	.000

Overall
Team	Won	Lost	Winning %
Philadelphia Hancock	12	2	.857
Philadelphia Xavier	12	2	.857
Philadelphia Dobson	9	4	.623
Philadelphia SPHAs	8	6	.571
Philadelphia Mt. Carmel	4	10	.286
Philadelphia Girard	3	10	.231
Philadelphia Criterion	3	11	.214
Philadelphia St. Columba	2	9	.181
