= Red Rosan =

American basketball player and coach

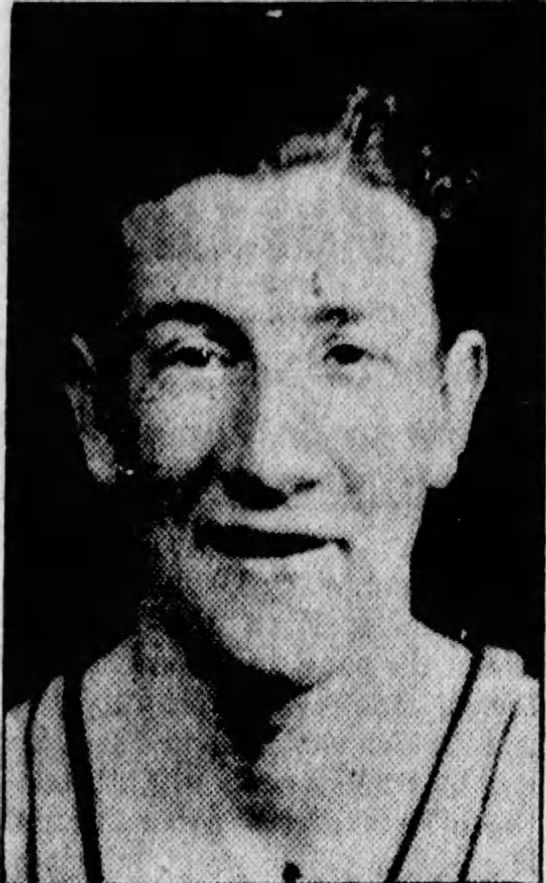

Personal information
- Born: May 22, 1911 Norma, New Jersey, U.S.
- Died: September 3, 1976 (aged 65) Wynnewood, Pennsylvania, U.S.
- Listed height: 6 ft 2 in (1.88 m)
- Listed weight: 185 lb (84 kg)

Career information
- High school: South Philadelphia (Philadelphia, Pennsylvania)
- College: Temple (1932–1935)
- Playing career: 1935–1945
- Coaching career: 1944–1946

Career history

Playing
- 1935–1944: Philadelphia Sphas
- 1936: Hazleton Mountaineers
- 1938: Allentown Barons
- 1944–1945: Baltimore Bullets

Coaching
- 1944–1946: Baltimore Bullets

Career highlights
- As player: 5× ABL champion (1936, 1937, 1940, 1941, 1943); Temple Hall of Fame (1976); As coach: ABL champion (1946)

Howard "Red" Rosan (May 22, 1911 – September 3, 1976) was an American basketball player and coach in the American Basketball League (ABL). Rosan played for the Philadelphia Sphas from 1934 to 1945 and coached the Baltimore Bullets from 1944 to 1946. He was inducted into the Temple Athletics Hall of Fame in 1976 and posthumously inducted in the International Jewish Sports Hall of Fame in 1996 as a member of the Philadelphia Sphas.

== Early life and education ==
Rosan was born on May 22, 1911, and grew up in South Philadelphia. He began playing basketball while at South Philadelphia High School. After high school, Rosan enrolled in Temple University and played for the Owls for three seasons, then graduated in 1935.

== Career ==
Upon completing college, Rosan joined the Philadelphia Sphas at the end of the 1934–35 ABL season. He played for 10 seasons with the Sphas until leaving to play for the Baltimore Bullets in 1944. While with the Bullets, Rosan took over as head coach for the team and replaced Ben Kramer at the start of the 1944–45 season. The following season, Rosan coached the Bullets towards their 1945–46 ABL championship win. With Baltimore, Rosan had 34 wins and 26 losses. Outside of the ABL, Rosan played basketball briefly for the Hazleton Mountaineers and Allentown Barons in 1936 and 1938, respectively.

== Personal life ==
Rosan died on September 3, 1976, in Wynnewood, Pennsylvania. He was married and had two children.
