= Harry Litwack =

American basketball player-coach (1907–1999)

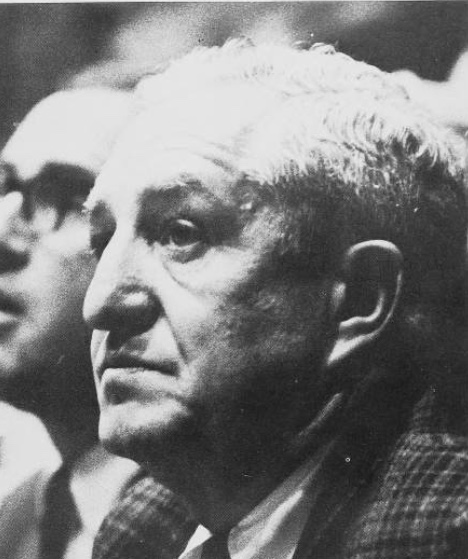
- Litwack during the 1964–65 season

Biographical details
- Born: September 20, 1907; Galicia, Austria-Hungary (modern-day Poland)
- Died: August 7, 1999 (aged 91); Huntingdon Valley, Pennsylvania, U.S.

Playing career
- 1927–1930: Temple
- 1930–1936: Philadelphia Sphas

Coaching career (HC unless noted)
- 1948–1951: Philadelphia Warriors (assistant)
- 1952–1973: Temple

Head coaching record
- Overall: 373–193
- Tournaments: 7–6 (NCAA); 9–6 (NIT)

Accomplishments and honors

Championships
- 2 NCAA Regional – Final Four (1956, 1958); NIT (1969); 4 MAC (1964, 1967, 1969, 1972)
- Basketball Hall of Fame; Inducted in 1976 (profile)

Harold "Chief" Litwack (September 20, 1907 – August 7, 1999) was an American college basketball coach. He served as head basketball coach at Temple University from 1952 to 1973, compiling a record of 373–193. He was inducted into the Naismith Basketball Hall of Fame in 1973.

== Coaching career ==
Litwack was born in Galicia, Austria-Hungary (modern-day Poland) but raised in Philadelphia, Pennsylvania. He graduated from Temple in 1930. He began his coaching career at Simon Gratz High School (1930–31), then he became head coach of the freshman team at Temple. Meanwhile, he was playing pro basketball with Eddie Gottlieb's all-Jewish Philadelphia Sphas, from 1930 to 1936. Before he became head coach at Temple in 1952, he also served briefly as assistant coach for the Philadelphia Warriors (1948–51). He died at the age of 91 in 1999.

He coached Team USA's gold medal-winning team at the 1957 Maccabiah Games in Israel, and its silver medal-winning team at the 1973 Maccabiah Games.

== Head coaching record ==
Record table
Season	Team	Overall	Conference	Standing	Postseason
Temple Owls (Independent) (1952–1958)
1952–53	Temple	16–10			
1953–54	Temple	15–12			
1954–55	Temple	11–10			
1955–56	Temple	27–4			NCAA Third Place
1956–57	Temple	20–9			NIT Third Place
1957–58	Temple	27–3			NCAA University Division Third Place
Temple Owls (Middle Atlantic Conference) (1958–1973)
1958–59	Temple	6–19	4–7	9th	
1959–60	Temple	17–9	9–2	3rd	NIT First Round
1960–61	Temple	20–8	9–1	2nd	NIT Quarterfinals
1961–62	Temple	18–9	8–2	2nd	NIT Quarterfinals
1962–63	Temple	15–7	6–3	4th	
1963–64	Temple	17–8	6–1	1st	NCAA University Division first round
1964–65	Temple	14–10	4–3	4th	
1965–66	Temple	21–7	5–3	4th	NIT Quarterfinals
1966–67	Temple	20–8	7–0	1st	NCAA University Division first round
1967–68	Temple	19–9	5–3	4th	NIT First Round
1968–69	Temple	22–8	6–1	1st	NIT Champion
1969–70	Temple	15–13	6–2	T–3rd (Eastern)	NCAA University Division first round
1970–71	Temple	13–12	3–3	4th (Eastern)	
1971–72	Temple	23–8	5–0	1st (Eastern)	NCAA University Division first round
1972–73	Temple	17–10	4–1	2nd (Eastern)	
Temple:		373–193	87–32		
Total:		373–193			
National champion Postseason invitational champion Conference regular season champion Conference regular season and conference tournament champion Division regular season champion Division regular season and conference tournament champion Conference tournament champion

== See also ==
- List of NCAA Division I men's basketball tournament Final Four appearances by coach
