= Red Wolfe (basketball) =

American basketball player and coach (1905–1970)

Personal information
- Born: July 18, 1905
- Died: October 9, 1970 (aged 65)
- Listed height: 5 ft 11 in (1.80 m)
- Listed weight: 165 lb (75 kg)

Career information
- High school: DeWitt Clinton (The Bronx, New York)
- College: St. John's (1927–1928)
- Playing career: 1928–1944
- Position: Guard/Forward

Career history

Playing
- 1928–1929: New York Hakoahs
- 1929–1944: Philadelphia Sphas

Coaching
- 1943–1945: LIU Brooklyn

Career highlights
- As player: 3× Eastern Basketball League champion (1930, 1931, 1932); 6× ABL champion (1934, 1936, 1937, 1940, 1941, 1943)

George "Red" Wolfe (July 18, 1905 – October 9, 1970) was an American basketball player and coach who was a member of the Philadelphia Sphas for fifteen seasons and was head coach of the LIU Brooklyn Blackbirds men's basketball from 1943 to 1945.

== Playing ==
Wolfe attended DeWitt Clinton High School in New York City. He was a member of the St. John's College men's basketball team during the 1927–28 season, then dropped out of school to play professional basketball. During the 1928–29 season, he was a member of the Brooklyn Dodgers, an independent club, and played three games for the New York Hakoahs of the American Basketball League.

In 1929, Wolfe joined the Philadelphia Sphas. He holds the team record for most seasons played and is second in total games played. He was a key member of nine championship teams.

== Coaching ==
In 1943, Wolfe took over as head coach at Long Island University (as it known to solely be named that at the time) after Clair Bee entered the United States Merchant Marine program. He inherited a roster that was led by Eddie Younger and Irv Rothenberg. Over two seasons, Wolfe compiled a 26–8 record.

Wolfe learned from a bookmaker friend that his team was fixing games. He threatened to turn in any player who took part, but the fixing continued and he did not discipline any players in the process. After a match fixing scandal at Brooklyn College came to light, he and CCNY head coach Nat Holman publicly denounced New York City mayor Fiorello La Guardia's accusation that "the practice of "bribing athletes was widespread". Players from both LIU and CCNY were later implicated in the 1951 college basketball point-shaving scandal, which led to LIU shutting down its basketball program for a few years.
