= Philadelphia Warriors (ABL) =

- Nickname: The Quakers; The Phillies
- Leagues: American Basketball League 1926-1928
- Founded: 1926
- Folded: 1928
- History: Philadelphia Quakers / Phillies; 1926; Philadelphia Warriors; 1926–1928
- Arena: Philadelphia Arena (4.000)

The Philadelphia Warriors were an American basketball team based in Philadelphia, Pennsylvania that was a member of the American Basketball League.

The Warriors were born out of the Philadelphia SPHAs (South Philadelphia Hebrew Association), and headed up by Eddie Gottlieb, a Philadelphia native who tried, through various leagues and teams, to bring about both national and Philadelphia-based basketball associations to the country. He was player-coach for a long time, eventually winning a title with the Warriors in the early days of the NBA.

The team was originally called the Philadelphia Quakers (sometimes also known as the Philadelphia Phillies) in 1926-1927 and played their home games at the Philadelphia Arena. The team would be helped out in terms of promotion with boxing promoters Jules Anderson and Max Hoff during their time in the original ABL. On January 4, 1927, the Phillies defeated the Brooklyn Celtics 31 to 29 in front of 9,000 fans at the Arena, a record for professional basketball in the city at the time.

The Warriors were a team primarily employing white players during the days of the ABL, although not exclusively. They benefited from the folding of the New York Renaissance, by far the most skilled team of the time, who were pushed out of professional basketball by the refusal of the league, and particularly the all-white New York Celtics, to play games against exclusively black teams. Philadelphia, as a city that is particularly heavily lived-in by black citizens, looked at basketball as both an opportunity for recognition and escape. Young men had "hoop dreams" and wanted to fight their way to the ABL, or NBA today, and having a local successful professional basketball team allowed for the observation of successful black men in a sport that they were interested in. This resulted also in a feeling of community in the city between black men, and contributed to the culture of racial minorities in Philadelphia that the city is known for. The Warriors factored heavily into the progress of young black athletes in the city, which has continued to this day with things like the Chosen League that occurs annually.

Year	League	Reg. season Record	Standing	Playoffs
1926/27	ABL	14-7 (1st half); 13-8 (2nd half)	3rd (1st half); 4th (2nd half)	Did not qualify
1927/28	ABL	30-21	2nd, Eastern	First-round exit, defeated by New York

== Notable players ==
- Al Kellett
- George Artus
- Tom Barlow
- Harry Riconda
- Lou Schneiderman
- Red Sherr
- Stretch Meehan
- Chick Passon
- Teddy Kearns
- George Glasco
