= Philadelphia Lodge No. 2 BPOE (1925) =

- Formerly listed on the U.S. National Register of Historic Places
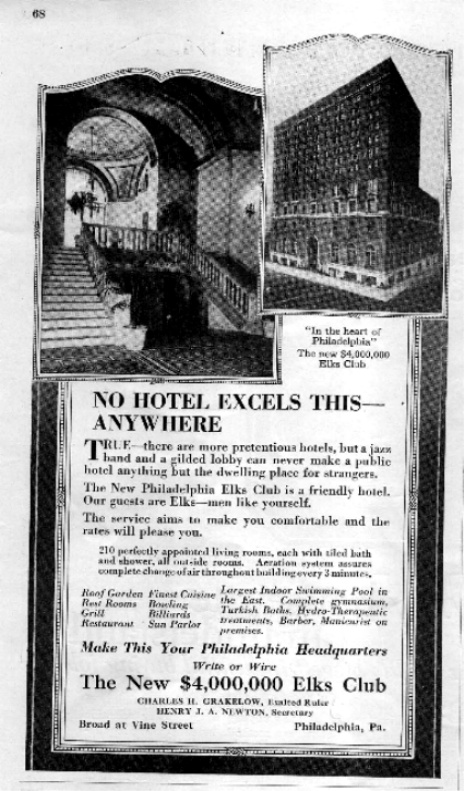
- Elk's Lodge advertisement, c. 1925

- Location within Philadelphia Location within Pennsylvania Location within the United States
- Location: 306-320 N. Broad St. Philadelphia, Pennsylvania, United States
- Coordinates: 39.9583°N 75.1628°W
- Built: 1922-1925
- Architect: Andrew J. Sauer
- Architectural style: Regency
- Demolished: 1992
- NRHP reference No.: 84003535

Significant dates
- Added to NRHP: August 23, 1984
- Removed from NRHP: June 23, 2023

The Philadelphia Lodge No. 2 BPOE, also known as the Philadelphia Athletic Club and the Broadwood Hotel, was a historic American Benevolent and Protective Order of Elks (BPOE) lodge that occupied 306-320 North Broad Street in the Logan Square neighborhood of Center City Philadelphia.

== History and notable features ==
This lodge, built between 1922 and 1925, was a thirteen-story building. The BPOE moved into the new lodge from the four-story building located at 1320–1322 Arch Street, built between 1904 and 1906, and designed by Francis Caldwell and Edward Simon, that still stands.

The Elks occupied the bottom five floors, with residential/hotel accommodations in the higher eight floors. The lower floors included meeting rooms, restaurants, ballrooms, and auditoria. The entrance featured a two-storey portal framed in limestone and capped by a giant keystone.

The Philadelphia Lodge No. 2 BPOE building circa 2013.

The Philadelphia Sphas basketball team played many of their home games at the Broadwood Hotel. Saturday night games would be followed by a dance with a live band. However, the hotel's basketball court would be placed in the ballroom area of the hotel, which involving walking up three flights of marble stairs first before reaching the ballroom area for the Sphas to compete upon the improvised basketball court. Not only that, but there were times where, despite being able to host 3,000 fans in the ballroom area, close of half of, if not a fair bit more than, the same fans that would try to pay to get in to watch the games never got in to see them properly due to fans sometimes being stuck on the long stairways going all the way to the open street, with fans being stuck at that time only being able to get a relay of the final score from mouth to mouth word from the fans that were able to watch the game properly (assuming they wouldn't stick around for the dancing soon afterward as well).

Although being added to the National Register of Historic Places in 1984, the building was purchased by Hahnemann University (now known as the Drexel University College of Medicine) for $2.35 million in 1991 and was demolished the following year. It was removed from the National Register in 2023.
