= 1942–43 Trenton Tigers season =

- Conference champions
- League: American Basketball League (revived original)
- Head coach: Teddy Kearns & Red Smith
- General manager: Girard Naples(?)
- Owner(s): Girard Naples
- Arena: Trenton Arena

Results
- Record: 11–2 (.846)
- Place: Conference: 1st
- Playoff finish: Lost ABL championship 4-3 to the Philadelphia SPHAs

The 1942–43 Trenton Tigers season was presumably the 30th professional basketball season played by the Trenton Tigers (and their fourth professional season under the Tigers name properly after previously using the Nationals, Trentons, Potters, (Royal) Bengals, and (presumably) Moose team names alongside the merged season in the failed "original" National Basketball League as the Greenpoint Knights of St. Anthony/Trenton Royal Bengals and the combined season of play for the Trenton Bengals when they operated as both the Paterson Panthers earlier in the 1935–36 season and the Passaic Red Devils later in the 1935–36 season) of the revived original version of the American Basketball League. If their history truly went as far back as it has been (thus making them the oldest existing professional basketball team by this point in time), then this season would end up marking (at least) their 45th overall season of existence (though a season of play would end up being lost due to World War I, meaning it'd be closer to their 44th overall season of existence instead due to the "Great War" period resulting in a hiatus season of sorts), as well as their 23rd overall professional basketball season with some sort of professional basketball league when combining the histories of all of these leagues with this season of play here. Regardless of the proper context for them, the Trenton Tigers would be one of only five teams competing in the ABL throughout the entire season this time around, though the ABL would actually have more teams competing in their league than the rivaling National Basketball League for once in their rivalry. However, this season would be a lot different from the previous season that the Tigers played in due to the wartime situation that the U.S.A. was in following the Attack on Pearl Harbor during the previous season, to the point where both the ABL and the NBL considered cancelling their respective seasons until World War II concluded before the government allowed them to continue onward in order to boost morale within the nation. The changes would not only lead to the U.S.A. implementing travel restricting such as forbidding "pleasure driving" in order to limit gasoline consumption (thus limiting the amount of games played by teams during the season), but also led to the ABL and NBL doing an agreement with the minor Connecticut State Basketball League where it was prohibited to transfer players between their leagues without due compensation in order to minimize the effects of many of the game's players joining the war effort during this period in time as well.

In spite of the limitations involved with this season, the Tigers would perform a whole lot better during this season than they did in their previous season of play. So much so, in fact, that if it weren't for two different losses that occurred in the regular season against the Philadelphia SPHAs, Trenton would have gone undefeated during the regular season period that was played within the ABL this time around due to the Tigers having an 11–2 record for the season. However, because the ABL would utilize having a proper regular season format for this season following the shortened up season (which the ABL supposedly decided to shorten up themselves on their own accord) instead of having a split season format that was used in the previous season of play, Trenton would have to compete against the aforementioned Philadelphia SPHAs in order to earn their first championship while in the ABL. Throughout the first six games played in the best-of-seven championship series, the Tigers and the SPHAs would split the series up with each other, with Trenton winning the odd-numbered games and Philadelphia winning the even-numbered games played. (Interestingly, the series would be delayed for close to two weeks in-between Games 4 & 5 being played due to both the Tigers and SPHAs agreeing to have their players rest up for recovery purposes since both teams had serious injuries to key players during the series at the time.) However, the decisive seventh game played at home would end with the Tigers losing a close 44–42 road match to the SPHAs, which denied Trenton their first championship in the ABL.

== Roster ==
Due to information on American Basketball League players being generally hard to find, there are bound to be more gaps and/or inaccuracies found in certain areas on the team's roster spots than usual.

Player	Position(s)
Mike Bloom	C
Ed Coleman	F
Allie Esposito	G/F
Dick Fitzgerald	G/F
Herbie Gershon	G/F
Ace Goldstein	G/F
Dick Gray	G/F
Matt Guokas	F/C
Barney Hassett	G/F
Bill Zubic	C

Note: Neither Ed Coleman (who might have been (named) Al Coleman instead) nor Barney Hassett would end up competing in the ABL's championship series for this season due to the ever-growing presence of World War II at hand.

== American Basketball League Standings ==
Pos.	League Standings	Wins	Losses	Win %
1	Trenton Tigers	11	2	.846
2	Philadelphia SPHAs	9	6	.600
3	Camden Indians / Brooklyn Indians^{[a]}	3	5	.375
4	Harrisburg Senators	4	8	.333
5	New York Jewels	1	7	.125

== American Basketball League Championship Series ==
ABL Championship Series
Game	Date	Opponent	Score	Record
Game 1	March 6	@ Philadelphia SPHAs	36–27	0–1
Game 2	March 7	Philadelphia SPHAs	35–42	1–1
Game 3	March 13	@ Philadelphia SPHAs	37–30	1–2
Game 4	March 14	Philadelphia SPHAs	39–42	2–2
Game 5	March 27	@ Philadelphia SPHAs	48–38	2–3
Game 6	March 28	Philadelphia SPHAs	33–34	3–3
Game 7	April 3	@ Philadelphia SPHAs	42–44	3–4

The delay in-between Games 4 and 5 in this championship series between the Philadelphia SPHAs and the Trenton Tigers involved team owners Eddie Gottlieb and Girard Naples agreeing to delay the series for almost two weeks due to both teams needing to rest up several of their key players that were affected by injuries at the time.

== Notes ==
^{a} The Camden Indians moved from Camden, New Jersey to nearby Brooklyn, New York on January 18, 1943.
