= 1943–44 Trenton Tigers season =

- League: American Basketball League (revived original)
- Head coach: Teddy Kearns & Red Smith (1–1); Dutch Dehnert (7–5); Girard Naples (7–5)
- General manager: Girard Naples(?)
- Owner(s): Girard Naples
- Arena: Trenton Arena

Results
- Record: 15–11 (.577)
- Place: Conference: 3rd (1st half); 2nd (2nd half)
- Playoff finish: Did not qualify

The 1943–44 Trenton Tigers season was presumably the 31st professional basketball season played by the Trenton Tigers (and their fifth professional season under the Tigers name properly after previously using the Nationals, Trentons, Potters, (Royal) Bengals, and (presumably) Moose team names alongside the merged season in the failed "original" National Basketball League as the Greenpoint Knights of St. Anthony/Trenton Royal Bengals and the combined season of play for the Trenton Bengals when they operated as both the Paterson Panthers earlier in the 1935–36 season and the Passaic Red Devils later in the 1935–36 season) of the revived original version of the American Basketball League. If their history truly went as far back as it has been (thus making them the oldest existing professional basketball team by this point in time), then this season would end up marking (at least) their 46th overall season of existence (though a season of play would end up being lost due to World War I, meaning it'd be closer to their 45th overall season of existence instead due to the "Great War" period resulting in a hiatus season of sorts), as well as their 24th overall professional basketball season with some sort of professional basketball league when combining the histories of all of these leagues with this season of play here. Regardless of the proper context for them, the Trenton Tigers would originally be one of five teams competing in the ABL to start out this season (under a manner where the ABL would have to work in tandem with the rivaling National Basketball League in order to ensure mutual survival between the two leagues during the World War II era), though the number would drop down to four teams by the start of the second half of the season. Interestingly, the ABL would decide to return to the split season formatting they had for most of their history instead of the regular season format from the previous season; this would later become the last season where the ABL would utilize that kind of formatting for their regular seasons, as future seasons would have them utilize the proper regular season format going forward.

Entering this season, Trenton looked like they would be one of the best teams competing throughout the entire league by comparison to the rest of the league once again. Unfortunately for the Tigers, the return of the split season formatting would end up being an absolute detriment for the team's overall results by comparison to what it would have looked like had they played in a proper regular season format like they did in their previous season in the league. For the first half of the season, after hiring head coach Dutch Dehnert to replace the duo coaching tandem of Teddy Kearns and Red Smith following their first two games played this season, the Tigers would get an above-average 8–6 record for a third place finish that put them ahead of both the Brooklyn Indians (who would leave the ABL after that half of the season ended) and the Philadelphia SPHAs, but behind only the newly-added New York Americans and the (returning) Wilmington Bombers. As for the second half of the season, once team owner Girard Naples took over for head coaching duties for the rest of the season, Trenton would once again get an above-average record for that half of the season, this time barely getting it with a 7–5 record, that put them ahead of New York and Wilmington, but put them behind Philadelphia for a second place finish under that half of the season. While Trenton would have one of the best overall records for the season alongside the Wilmington Bombers, due to the way the split season formatting worked for postseason play, the Tigers would end up failing to qualify for the ABL's championship series since the Philadelphia SPHAs would take the second half spot for the championship series against the Wilmington Bombers, though the Bombers would end up winning the league's championship once again from the final championship series that was played under the split season format.

== Roster ==
Due to information on American Basketball League players being generally hard to find, there are bound to be more gaps and/or inaccuracies found in certain areas on the team's roster spots than usual.

Player	Position(s)
Ace Abbott	G/F
Ben Auerbach	G/F
Mike Bloom	C
Lee Craddock	F/C
Irv Davis	G/F
Allie Esposito	G
Dick Fitzgerald	G/F
Herbie Gershon	G/F
Matt Guokas	F/C
Tony Krygier	G/F
Red Paris	G/F
Devon Smith	G/F
Ray Studwell	G/F
Ace Tramantan	G
Bob Tough	G/F

== American Basketball League Standings ==
First Half
Team	Wins	Losses	Winning %
Wilmington Bombers	12	4	.750
New York Americans	9	6	.600
Trenton Tigers	8	6	.571
Philadelphia SPHAs	4	10	.286
Brooklyn Indians^{[a]}	2	9	.182

Second Half
Team	Wins	Losses	Winning %
Philadelphia SPHAs	8	4	.667
Trenton Tigers	7	5	.583
Wilmington Bombers	5	5	.500
New York Americans	2	8	.200

== Awards and honors ==
By the end of the season, Mike Bloom would end up being the leading scorer of the entire league for the eleventh season of its return and its seventeenth overall season of existence with 273 points scored for an average of 10.5 points per game.

== Notes ==
^{a} The Brooklyn Indians would drop out of the ABL by the end of the first half of the season, later rebranding themselves as the Brooklyn Eagles for independent play before the second half of the season officially began (notably playing under that name by the time the 1944 World Professional Basketball Tournament happened).
