= 1944–45 Trenton Tigers season =

- League: American Basketball League (revived original)
- Head coach: Teddy Kearns
- General manager: Girard Naples(?)
- Owner(s): Girard Naples
- Arena: Trenton Arena

Results
- Record: 21–9 (.700)
- Place: Conference: 2nd
- Playoff finish: Lost ABL semifinals 2-1 to the Baltimore Bullets.

The 1944–45 Trenton Tigers season was presumably the 32nd professional basketball season played by the Trenton Tigers (and their sixth professional season under the Tigers name properly after previously using the Nationals, Trentons, Potters, (Royal) Bengals, and (presumably) Moose team names alongside the merged season in the failed "original" National Basketball League as the Greenpoint Knights of St. Anthony/Trenton Royal Bengals and the combined season of play for the Trenton Bengals when they operated as both the Paterson Panthers earlier in the 1935–36 season and the Passaic Red Devils later in the 1935–36 season) of the revived original version of the American Basketball League. If their history truly went as far back as it has been (thus making them the oldest existing professional basketball team by this point in time), then this season would end up marking (at least) their 47th overall season of existence (though a season of play would end up being lost due to World War I, meaning it'd be closer to their 46th overall season of existence instead due to the "Great War" period resulting in a hiatus season of sorts), as well as their 25th overall professional basketball season with some sort of professional basketball league when combining the histories of all of these leagues with this season of play here. Regardless of the proper context for them, the Trenton Tigers would be one of six teams competing in the ABL this season in a time where World War II was nearing its end, with this also being the season where the ABL would permanently retire the split season format altogether. During this time, the Tigers would perform a lot better this season when compared to their previous season (due in part to Teddy Kearns returning as the full-time head coach this time around), as they'd finish the season with a 21–9 record to be one game behind the Philadelphia SPHAs for a first-place finish. As a result of their placement, Trenton would qualify for the ABL Playoffs as the #2 seed, with them going up against the newly added #4 seeded Baltimore Bullets expansion team (who ended up having a losing record on their ends). After the two teams split their first two games in the semifinal round, the Tigers would compete in a tournament held in Cleveland, Ohio before their players later participated with other (military-based) teams in the 1945 World Professional Basketball Tournament before later continuing their semifinal match. This would prove to have disastrous results for the Tigers, as not only would they perform poorly during those events, but Trenton would end up being upset by Baltimore in the decisive third and final game of the series with a 39–34 defeat, being eliminated by the new expansion team in their first season of play.

== Roster ==
Due to information on American Basketball League players being generally hard to find, there are bound to be more gaps and/or inaccuracies found in certain areas on the team's roster spots than usual.

Player	Position(s)
Ace Abbott	G/F
Eddie Alberts	G/F
Mike Bloom	C
Jack Curran	G/F
Jake Eisenhart	F
Zeppy Feiter	G/F
Herbie Gershon	G/F
Matt Guokas	F/C
Tony Krygier	G/F
Chris Langvardt	G/F
Roy Leenig	G/F
Jack McGuirk	F/C
Morris Pressman	G/F
Phil Rabin	G/F
Irv Schneider	G
Lou Smith	G/F
Devon Smith	G/F
Bob Tough	G/F

Note: In addition to all of those players at hand, they also had an unknown guard/forward with the last name of Whalen who very briefly played for the team as well. Not only that, but their playoff roster for this season would include Ace Abbott, Mike Bloom, Herbie Gershon, Matt Guokas (Sr.), Jack McGuirk, Lou Simon, and Bob Tough on their playoff roster properly.

== American Basketball League Standings ==
Pos.	Team	Wins	Losses	Win %
1	Philadelphia SPHAs	22	8	.733
2	Trenton Tigers	21	9	.700
3	Wilmington Bombers	14	14	.500
4	Baltimore Bullets	14	16	.467
5	New York Westchesters / Westchester Indians / New York Gothams^{[a]}	11	15	.423
6	Washington Capitols / Paterson Crescents^{[b]}	3	23	.115

== American Basketball League Playoffs ==
For this season, the ABL would go back to the original playoff format they had used in the past, which involved the #1 seed going up against the #3 seed and the #2 seed going up against the #4 seed in a best-of-three series before the remaining two teams competed against each other in the championship series (though the championship series for this season would be a best-of-three series this time around instead of a best-of-five series). For the Tigers, as the #2 seed this season, they would go up against the newly created Baltimore Bullets expansion franchise.

=== American Basketball League Semifinals ===
(2) Trenton Tigers vs. (4) Baltimore Bullets: Baltimore wins series 2–1

- Game 1: March 15, 1945 @ Baltimore: Baltimore 48, Trenton 38
- Game 2: March 16, 1945 @ Trenton: Trenton 43, Baltimore 38
- Game 3: April 2, 1945 @ Baltimore: Baltimore 39, Trenton 34

In-between Games 2 and 3 of the semifinal round, the Trenton Tigers would actually compete in a professional basketball tournament that was held in Cleveland, Ohio that was held on March 17 and 18, 1945, while players from the ABL would actually play in the 1945 World Professional Basketball Tournament for independently ran service teams like the Dayton Acmes and Long Island Grumman Hellcats (since some players also worked for military services in their spare time also during World War II) from March 19–24, 1945 before later returning to play the semifinals for the 1945 ABL Playoffs properly.

== Awards and honors ==
By the end of the season, Mike Bloom would end up being the leading scorer of the entire league for the second straight season in a row via its twelfth season of its return and its eighteenth overall season of existence with 321 points scored for an average of 10.7 points per game. This marked the fifth time in the league's history where a player would lead the ABL in scoring throughout multiple seasons (Rusty Saunders, Bennie Borgmann, Phil Rabin, Bobby McDermott) and the fourth time in the league's history where a player led the league in scoring in back-to-back seasons (Saunders, Borgmann, Rabin). However, this would also mark the last time where anyone would repeat as scoring champions at all in the ABL's history.

== Notes ==
^{a} The New York Westchesters (sometimes referred to as the Westchester Indians) would move from White Plains, New York to nearby Brooklyn, New York on January 20, 1945, thus subsequently changing their team name from the New York Westchesters (or Westchester Indians) to the New York Gothams in the process.
^{b} The Washington Capitols (no relation to the Washington Capitols team from the BAA/NBA that briefly moved to the ABL at one point in time themselves) would move from Washington, D.C. to Paterson, New Jersey on January 1, 1945, thus subsequently changing their team name from the original Washington Capitols ABL team to the Paterson Crescents in the process. The Capitols held a 2–8 record before moving to Paterson, while the Crescents had a 1–15 record for the rest of the season going forward.
