= 1946–47 Philadelphia Sphas season =

American basketball team season

- League: American Basketball League (revived original)
- Head coach: Harry Litwack
- General manager: Eddie Gottlieb; Harry Litwack
- Owner(s): Eddie Gottlieb; Abe Radel
- Arena: Broadwood Hotel

Results
- Record: 19–14 (.576)
- Place: Division: 2nd (Southern)
- Playoff finish: Lost ABL semifinals 2–1 to the Trenton Tigers

The Philadelphia Sphas were an early, historical example of an American professional basketball team. The 1946–47 season was the fourteenth season played in the now-revived American Basketball League by the Sphas, although they did play in the original rendition of the ABL from 1926 to 1928 as the Philadelphia Warriors, which had no relation to the later BAA franchise of the same name that now exists in the present day as the Golden State Warriors in the NBA. As such, when including the past history of the original ABL with the revived version of the ABL in 1933 following historical problems that related to the Great Depression near the end of 1931, this would technically be the twentieth official season played by the original ABL properly, though this would officially be the 30th season of play for the Sphas franchise when including previous seasons where they played under names like the "Philadelphia YMHA"; the "Philadelphia Passon, Gottlieb, Black", the "Philadelphia Warriors"; and the "Philadelphia Hebrews". This season is also seen by most historic professional basketball outlets as the first ever professional basketball season where the Sphas would be playing in a minor league instead of a major basketball league. However, it can also be argued that due to the size and scope of the ABL at the time, the ABL would still have this season be seen as a major professional basketball league (despite significantly less coverage being in mind when compared to previous seasons due, in part, to the introduction of the Philadelphia Warriors in the newer Basketball Association of America that Eddie Gottlieb both helped create and influence during his time, despite thinking at one point about potentially transferring his entire Sphas franchise to the newer BAA instead (which would have made the Sphas turned Warriors the oldest surviving franchise in BAA/NBA history)) before declining coverage in the 1947 ABL Playoffs forced its hand into officially becoming more like a minor league in terms of scope by comparison to both the rivaling National Basketball League and the newly created (and technically rivaling) Basketball Association of America.

This season was also the first season in the franchise's storied history where they would be without Eddie Gottlieb as either the team's head coach or the general manager (though he'd still be the team's co-owner alongside Abe Radel), as his services would end up being taken over from the Sphas by a new team created for the newly-created (and rivaling) professional basketball league called the Basketball Association of America (notably being the only representing person from the original thirteen turned eleven BAA franchises to have any prior experience with basketball at the time of the new league's existence). While he would initially think about transferring his own Philadelphia Sphas franchise out of the ABL and into the BAA (which would have eventually made this franchise become the oldest surviving basketball franchise in North American history by that point in time over the Sacramento Kings from their Rochester Seagrams days and the Detroit Pistons from their Fort Wayne Zollner Pistons days), Gottlieb would instead end up taking his primary services away from the Philadelphia Sphas into the newer version of the Philadelphia Warriors, which the Sphas had previously played as and would technically be used as tribute for the new franchise's name due to the Sphas previously playing as the Philadelphia Warriors during their original time in the original American Basketball League from 1926 until 1928. As such, he would relieve his head coaching and general manager duties to former Sphas player Harry Litwack for this season, with Litwack later being the final head coach and general manager for their entire history within any professional basketball leagues (though Jerry Rullo would later become a co-general manager for a later season while with the Sphas as well). Incidentally, when local coverage was going on for both the Sphas and Warriors during the 1947 BAA Playoffs and 1947 ABL Playoffs, more coverage within the Sphas' playoff run would end up going to the newer Philadelphia Warriors team in the BAA over the older Sphas franchise in the ABL. This season later ended with Gottlieb winning yet another professional basketball championship, but it would be for the inaugural Philadelphia Warriors team only due to him leading that team to a 4–1 championship series win in the 1947 BAA Finals over the Chicago Stags, though the Sphas would technically be three points away from joining them for what would have been their eighth (and final) ABL championship alongside the new Warriors team as well due to what would happen with the (original) Baltimore Bullets franchise during this season's ABL Playoffs following their final game in the semifinal round to the eventual champion Trenton Tigers.

== Background ==
The Sphas played in leagues around Philadelphia since 1917, but game-by-game records before the Sphas rejoined the ABL in 1933 are not (currently) available (at least, not to the general public if official game records did exist for the Sphas) and are therefore likely lost to time itself. When initially entering this season under an optimistic point of view, the ABL would enter an agreement with the rivaling National Basketball League and most other minor basketball leagues of the time (notably the New York State Professional Basketball League and the New England Basketball League amongst other minor leagues mostly held within the general Great Lakes region that were either forming or reforming their operations by this point in time) following an "Official Bulletin" that was also primarily sent out to the NBL's own teams in particular in order to both not infringe on player contract rights within a certain team's territory and to help regulate both tournaments and exhibition games within the sport of basketball going forward (as before this attempt occurred, both professional and minor basketball leagues were more loose with how the professional game should be handled beyond the general rules of the sport). However, due to the newly-created Basketball Association of America (and to a much lesser extent, the Pacific Coast Professional Basketball League) not entering that agreement, that agreement would end up being thrown away by many of those same leagues by the end of this season. Not only that, but following World War II's conclusion, the ABL sought to not only have the largest amount of teams in its entire existence by this point in time with ten total teams entering the league this season (including the Philadelphia Sphas and the Baltimore Bullets, as well as the revived Troy Celtics, though it would later decrease to nine teams by the end of the regular season), but also bring back divisions within the ABL for the first time since the 1927–28 season under its original iteration, though the ABL would only utilize them under the Northern and Southern Divisions (with the Sphas competing in the Southern Division alongside the Bullets) as opposed to the original Eastern and Western Divisions from that season. In addition to that, the ABL would set up a newer, larger playoff format for this season, with the intent of it involving "[t]he first team in each division will play in a series of the best three out of five games; the second place clubs in each division will play in a preliminary playoff series of the best two out of three games; the third and fourth place clubs in the official standing of the league at the termination of the 1946–1947 season, regardless of the division in which they are entered by computed on their percentage rating, will play in a preliminary series of the best two out of three games." However, one key factor that would end up leading to the ABL eventually losing its public distinction as a serious professional basketball league (arguably the premier professional basketball league at times) over both the rivaling NBL and newly-rivaling BAA was the decision to have the players play a majority of their games on the weekends instead of throughout a regular period of time throughout a week-by-week basis since they were still primarily working class citizens at the time over professional basketball players, with their status as players not being fully guaranteed for them when compared to their regular working jobs and the new BAA not having long-term guarantees of its own accord that it could survive as a new professional basketball league for more than just a few seasons at that point in time.

The Sphas finished second in the Southern Division with a 19–14 record, behind the Baltimore Bullets, who finished 31–3. Two of Baltimore’s three defeats came against the Sphas. Philadelphia qualified for the ABL playoffs and faced the Jersey City Atoms, who had finished second in the Northern Division with a 14–22 record.

The Sphas defeated the Atoms in three games and advanced to face the Trenton Tigers. Baltimore received a bye to the planned championship round but withdrew to participate in the 1947 World Professional Basketball Tournament. The series between Philadelphia and Trenton therefore became the championship series.

Philadelphia lost the opening game 81–64 on 23 March, before winning 46–42 on 2 April to level the series. Trenton won the deciding game 48–46 on 12 April to claim the ABL championship. The final game was played before a Philadelphia Warriors–Chicago Stags game in the 1947 BAA Finals. This was the Sphas’ final appearance in the ABL playoffs.

== Roster ==
Due to information on American Basketball League players being generally hard to find (especially by the time the ABL was designated more as a minor league during its later years of existence), there are bound to be more gaps and/or inaccuracies found in certain areas on the team's roster spots than usual.

1946–47 Philadelphia Sphas roster
Players

Pos.	No.	Player	Height	Weight	DOB	From
F		Stan Brown	6 ft 3 in (1.91 m)	200 lb (91 kg)	1929–06–27	South Philadelphia HS (PA)
F/C		Irv Davis	6 ft 2 in (1.88 m)	195 lb (88 kg)	1915–01–10	NYU
G/F		Nat Frankel	6 ft 0 in (1.83 m)	195 lb (88 kg)	1913–11–03	Brooklyn
		Mort Freemark			1926–07–10	Unknown
G/F		Bud Gaines			1920–10–11	CCNY
		Herb Greenspan			1915?	Unknown
		Art Gurfein			1921–11–18	Long Island
F/C		Jack Hewson	6 ft 6 in (1.98 m)	195 lb (88 kg)	1924–09–17	Temple
G		Red Klotz	5 ft 7 in (1.70 m)	150 lb (68 kg)	1920–10–21	Villanova
		Bill Kobler			Unknown	St. John's
F/C		Inky Lautman	6 ft 2 in (1.88 m)	205 lb (93 kg)	1914–05–22	Central HS (PA)
G		Bernard Opper	6 ft 0 in (1.83 m)	185 lb (84 kg)	1915–09–01	Kentucky
G/F		Butch Schwartz	6 ft 2 in (1.88 m)	190 lb (86 kg)	1919–02–14	Long Island
		Mendy Snyder			1915–01–31	Temple
G/F		Leonard Weiner	6 ft 1 in (1.85 m)	180 lb (82 kg)	1923–10–26	Unknown

Coaches
Head coach
- Harry Litwack

Legend
- (DP) Unsigned draft pick
- (FA) Free agent
- (S) Suspended
- Injured

It's ultimately unknown which players may not have taken part in the 1947 ABL Playoffs due to public perception of the American Basketball League being degraded from a major, professional basketball league similar to the rivaling National Basketball League and the newly created Basketball Association of America by this point in time (though it's likely that Art Gurfein, Danny Gaines, Herb Greenspan, and Bill Kobler were absolutely not a part of the Sphas' final playoff run while in the ABL).

== ABL Standings ==
Due to the number of teams in the ABL this season, this would mark the first time since the 1927–28 season where the ABL would utilize divisions within their league in a proper manner, though unlike that season, the ABL would utilize a Northern Division and a Southern Division (which the Sphas competed in) instead of the typical Eastern Division and Western Division that had been on display for most other professional leagues at the time.

=== Northern Division ===
Pos.	Team	Wins	Losses	Win %
1	Brooklyn Gothams - y	24	10	.706
2	Jersey City Atoms - x	14	22	.389
3	Troy Celtics	13	22	.371
4	Paterson Crescents	11	23	.324
5	Newark Bobcats / Kingston Chiefs / Yonkers Chiefs^{a} †	7	17	.292

† – Did not survive the ABL season.

=== Southern Division ===
Pos.	Team	Wins	Losses	Win %
1	Baltimore Bullets - z	31	3	.912
2	Philadelphia SPHAs - x	19	14	.675
3	Trenton Tigers - x	17	17	.500
4	Elizabeth Braves - x	15	18	.455
5	Wilmington Bombers	15	20	.429

== ABL Schedule ==
For the rest of the ABL's entire existence going forward, the ABL would utilize a proper, full regular season instead of two half-seasons for its regular season formatting, though this season would utilize the unique stipulation of divisional formatting at hand, since that would actually matter for playoff positioning throughout this season by comparison to previous seasons in the ABL.

=== ABL Regular Season ===
Game	Date	Opponent	Score	Record
1	October 26	Paterson Crescents	54–71	0–1
2	November 2	Trenton Tigers	68–62	1–1
3	November 3	@ Newark Bobcats^{a}	55–54	2–1
4	November 6	@ Jersey City Atoms	51–44	3–1
5	November 9	Jersey City Atoms	64–57	4–1
6	November 24	@ Brooklyn Gothams	47–68	4–2
7	November 29	@ Wilmington Bombers	77–83	4–3
8	November 30	Baltimore Bullets	68–63	5–3
9	December 5	@ Baltimore Bullets	46–59	5–4
10	December 7	Wilmington Bombers	83–77	6–4
11	December 8	@ Trenton Tigers	40–52	6–5
12	December 14	Troy Celtics	69–59	7–5
13	December 19	@ Troy Celtics	52–49	8–5
14	December 21	Elizabeth Braves	81–51	9–5
15	December 25	@ Elizabeth Braves	58–67	9–6
16	December 28	Brooklyn Gothams	49–59	9–7
17	December 29	@ Paterson Crescents	58–53	10–7
18	January 4	Kingston Chiefs^{a}	73–55	11–7
19	January 5	@ Brooklyn Gothams	53–70	11–8
20	January 8	@ Jersey City Atoms	51–58	11–9
21	January 11	Jersey City Atoms	85–66	12–9
22	January 18	Trenton Tigers	67–57	13–9
23	January 19	@ Wilmington Bombers	71–72	13–10
24	January 25	Paterson Crescents	89–63	14–10
25	January 26	@ Paterson Crescents	65–67	14–11
26	February 1	Baltimore Bullets	77–59	15–11
27	February 2	@ Trenton Tigers	86–96	15–12
28	February 4	Troy Celtics	58–44	16–12
29	February 8	Wilmington Bombers	88–71	17–12
30	February 20	@ Elizabeth Braves	60–44	18–12
31	February 27	@ Baltimore Bullets	61–86	18–13
32	March 5	@ Troy Celtics	51–57	18–14
33	March 6	Brooklyn Gothams	60–53	19–14

=== ABL Playoffs ===
Due to the larger number of teams entering this season (the most in one ABL season, in fact), the ABL would set up a newer, larger playoff format for this season, with the intent of it involving "[t]he first team in each division will play in a series of the best three out of five games; the second place clubs in each division will play in a preliminary playoff series of the best two out of three games; the third and fourth place clubs in the official standing of the league at the termination of the 1946–1947 season, regardless of the division in which they are entered by computed on their percentage rating, will play in a preliminary series of the best two out of three games." Because of it, the newly-created quarterfinal round that would only appear in this season would have the Sphas (the #2 seeded Southern Division team) going up against the Jersey City Atoms (the #2 seeded Northern Division team) in a best-of-three series.

==== ABL Quarterfinals ====
Game	Date	Opponent	Score	Record
Game 1	March 13	Jersey City Atoms	56–47	1–0
Game 2	March 16	@ Jersey City Atoms	60–67	1–1
Game 3	March 20	Jersey City Atoms	56–50	2–1

==== ABL Semifinals ====
Originally, the ABL's semifinal round between the #2 seeded Philadelphia Sphas and the #3 seeded Trenton Tigers was going to be a best-of-three series that would have the winner compete against the #1 seeded Baltimore Bullets, who had a monstrous 31–3 record for their regular season (though the number of games for the championship round in question for this season would later be unknown for reasons that would soon be revealed to the general public at hand). However, due to scheduling conflicts that related to how long the semifinal round in particular was taking and the Bullets wanting to compete in the 1947 World Professional Basketball Tournament, this semifinal round would unofficially be considered the championship series of the ABL for this season instead. For some basketball historians, it's considered likely that the treatment of this playoff series in particular was the death nail in the coffin for the revived American Basketball League since its reputation as a professional basketball would decline downward into that of only a minor professional basketball league by comparison to its original glory days.

Game	Date	Opponent	Score	Record
Game 1	March 23	@ Trenton Tigers	64–81	0–1
Game 2	April 2	Trenton Tigers	46–42	1–1
Game 3	April 12	Trenton Tigers	46–48	1–2

This would later end up becoming the last playoff series the Philadelphia Sphas would ever officially compete in throughout their franchise's history.

== Notes ==
^{a} The Newark Bobcats first transferred their franchise from Newark, New Jersey to Kingston, New York on December 23, 1946 (though they did not necessarily change their team name at the time (but if they did, they would have changed it to the Kingston Chiefs instead)) and then moved to nearby Yonkers, New York to become the Yonkers Chiefs on January 22, 1947 (though the Sphas would never play against the Yonkers Chiefs under that franchise name), before folding operations entirely by the middle of February in 1947.
