= 1941–42 Trenton Tigers season =

- League: American Basketball League (revived original)
- Head coach: Teddy Kearns & Red Smith
- General manager: Girard Naples(?)
- Owner(s): Girard Naples
- Arena: Trenton Arena

Results
- Record: 11–14 (.440)
- Place: Conference: 4th (1st half); 2nd (2nd half)
- Playoff finish: Did not qualify. (Wilmington Blue Bombers won the ABL's championship by default due to them being the best team in both halves of the ABL's season.)

The 1941–42 Trenton Tigers season was presumably the 29th professional basketball season played by the Trenton Tigers (and their third professional season under the Tigers name properly after previously using the Nationals, Trentons, Potters, (Royal) Bengals, and (presumably) Moose team names alongside the merged season in the failed "original" National Basketball League as the Greenpoint Knights of St. Anthony/Trenton Royal Bengals and the combined season of play for the Trenton Bengals when they operated as both the Paterson Panthers earlier in the 1935–36 season and the Passaic Red Devils later in the 1935–36 season) of the revived original version of the American Basketball League. If their history truly went as far back as it has been (thus making them the oldest existing professional basketball team by this point in time), then this season would end up marking (at least) their 44th overall season of existence (though a season of play would end up being lost due to World War I, meaning it'd be closer to their 43rd overall season of existence instead due to the "Great War" period resulting in a hiatus season of sorts), as well as their 22nd overall professional basketball season with some sort of professional basketball league when combining the histories of all of these leagues with this season of play here. Regardless of the proper context for them, the Trenton Tigers would mark the official return of professional basketball for the city of Trenton, New Jersey when it came to competing in the ABL just in time for World War II to begin in the United States of America, though they would only be one of five teams to actually be in the ABL to start out the season this time around due to previous struggles within the league in previous seasons of play thanks to various teams folding and then merging operations with each other. Presumably, the Tigers would end up returning to operations in the ABL after being on hiatus for eight straight years from their Trenton Moose days, although it would be closer to around six straight years instead if one were to count their brief period of time as the Paterson Panthers / Trenton Bengals / Passaic Red Devils. Regardless, the Tigers were one of five teams competing in the ABL during this struggling season of theirs, though it would later turn into four teams when the New York Jewels decided to (briefly) leave the ABL after the first half of the season ended in January 1942.

Throughout this season, Trenton would end up having an iffy time adjusting to their (potential) return into the ABL due to them previously being involved with the minor Tri-County League that later shut down operations on New Year's Eve on December 31, 1941. With them signing players that were previously playing in that soon-to-be-defunct league, the Tigers would end up producing a below-average performance with a 5–8 record for the first half of the season that had them get a fourth place finish, which led to them being ahead of only the New York Jewels, who interestingly decided to leave the ABL for the second half of this season. As for the second half of the season, Trenton would perform much better there by comparison, though they'd only compile an average 6–6 record by comparison to their below-average 5–8 from the first half of the season. Still, that record would put them a game ahead of both the Washington Brewers and the two-time defending champion Philadelphia Sphas for a second place finish behind the Wilmington Blue Bombers, who themselves were only two games behind the Tigers for that half of the season. Unfortunately, the Tigers would fail to qualify for the ABL's championship series due to them not being able to overtake the Blue Bombers in the second half of the season, though the notion of a championship series being necessary this time around would prove to be folly in this case since the Wilmington Blue Bombers were considered the league champions by default due to them winning both halves of the ABL's season, which was the only time this would happen in the ABL's entire history when they utilized the split season format. Even so, despite dealing with some struggles early on in the season combined with later uncertainty in mind from the World War II era commencing, the Trenton Tigers would see some modest success financially on their ends, which would lead to them continuing operations for another season not long afterward.

== Roster ==
Due to information on American Basketball League players being generally hard to find, there are bound to be more gaps and/or inaccuracies found in certain areas on the team's roster spots than usual.

Player	Position(s)
George Abel	G
Sid Blair	G
Mike Bloom	F/C
Cy Boardman	F/C
Irv Davis	F/C
Rex Ellis	G/F
Allie Esposito	G
Willie Flynn	G/F
Dutch Garfinkel	G
Herbie Gershon	G
Rip Gerson	G
Ace Goldstein	F/C
Matt Guokas	G/F
Steve Juenger	F/C
Johnny Mroczkowski	F/C
Red Paris	F
Rusty Saunders	F/C
Bob Sigholtz	G/F
Bill Zubic	C

== American Basketball League Standings ==
First Half
Team	Wins	Losses	Winning %
Wilmington Blue Bombers	10	3	.769
Philadelphia SPHAs	8	6	.571
Washington Brewers	5	6	.455
Trenton Tigers	5	8	.385
New York Jewels^{[a]}	1	6	.143

Second Half
Team	Wins	Losses	Winning %
Wilmington Blue Bombers	8	4	.667
Trenton Tigers	6	6	.500
Philadelphia SPHAs	5	7	.417
Washington Brewers	5	7	.417

== Notes ==
^{a} The New York Jewels would drop out of the ABL by the end of the first half of the season on January 15, 1942.
