= 1946–47 Trenton Tigers season =

- League champions
- League: American Basketball League (revived original)
- Head coach: Herbie Gershon (player-coach)
- General manager: Girard Naples(?)
- Owner(s): Girard Naples
- Arena: Trenton Arena

Results
- Record: 17–17 (.500)
- Place: Division: 3rd (Southern)
- Playoff finish: ABL Champions (Won semifinal round 2-1 over the Philadelphia Sphas, with the Baltimore Bullets ultimately forfeiting the ABL championship series to the Trenton Tigers due to Baltimore taking part in the 1947 World Professional Basketball Tournament.)

The 1946–47 Trenton Tigers season was presumably the 34th professional basketball season played by the Trenton Tigers (and their eighth professional season under the Tigers name properly after previously using the Nationals, Trentons, Potters, (Royal) Bengals, and (presumably) Moose team names alongside the merged season in the failed "original" National Basketball League as the Greenpoint Knights of St. Anthony/Trenton Royal Bengals and the combined season of play for the Trenton Bengals when they operated as both the Paterson Panthers earlier in the 1935–36 season and the Passaic Red Devils later in the 1935–36 season) of the revived original version of the American Basketball League. If their history truly went as far back as it has been (thus making them the oldest existing professional basketball team by this point in time), then this season would end up marking (at least) their 49th overall season of existence (though a season of play would end up being lost due to World War I, meaning it'd be closer to their 48th overall season of existence instead due to the "Great War" period resulting in a hiatus season of sorts), as well as their 27th overall professional basketball season with some sort of professional basketball league when combining the histories of all of these leagues with this season of play here. Regardless of the proper context for them, the Trenton Tigers would enter this season under the ABL's biggest point of existence ever with ten total teams competing in the Northern and Southern divisions (instead of using the typical Eastern and Western divisions like the ABL had done back in the 1927–28 season), with five teams being in the Northern Division and five teams (including Trenton) being in the Southern Division. Throughout the season, Trenton would end up being considered a middling team with an average 17–17 record for a third place finish in the Southern division behind the Philadelphia SPHAs and the 31–3 Baltimore Bullets. Despite their average finish to the season, the Tigers would qualify for the ABL Playoffs this season, with their first round opponent being against the Elizabeth Braves, who had a fourth place finish in their division, due to the way the ABL set up their playoff formatting for this season.

During the first round of the ABL Playoffs, Trenton would sweep the #4 seeded Elizabeth Braves 2–0 in the first round with a blowout win at home in Game 1 and a close win on the road in Game 2. Following their quick first round performance, the Tigers would soon go up against the #2 seeded Philadelphia SPHAs, who would compete with Harry Litwack as the SPHAs' new head coach instead of long-time team owner Eddie Gottlieb due to him being focused on helping the Philadelphia Warriors from the newly-rivaling Basketball Association of America succeed as a franchise in their operations with that new league. What would hurt the ABL during this period of time (outside of having the 1947 BAA playoffs go on around the same period of time as the ABL Playoffs while in the city of Philadelphia) would be the way they not only held their semifinal round by comparison to the newer BAA when they hosted their own playoff setting, but also how the ABL decided to operate their championship series even after that league transitioned their play into (mostly) weekend competition for this season. Not only would the ABL's semifinal round have a massive gap between when their three games were played after the quarterfinal round held a regular schedule for each of the teams there, but the one road game Trenton played when going against the SPHAs (in the Philadelphia Arena this time around instead of at the usual Broadwood Hotel) saw the ABL be the headlining match for the doubleheader event held on April 2, 1947 that also featured the aforementioned Philadelphia Warriors go up against the St. Louis Bombers to open up the BAA's inaugural playoff series there as the main event match-up by comparison (though both Philadelphia teams would win their respective matches that night). After the Tigers would win a close, decisive Game 3 over the SPHAs with a 48–46 final score to win the semifinal round 2–1, Trenton would originally be scheduled to go up against the #1 seeded Baltimore Bullets (who nearly went undefeated in the season with a 31–3 record) for the ABL's championship series, but due to the defending champion Bullets deciding they wanted to compete in the 1947 World Professional Basketball Tournament instead of waiting until the semifinals were completed properly (which would have ironically benefitted the ABL in this case due to the 1947 WPBT ending a day before the ABL's semifinals concluded), the Tigers would controversially be named the ABL's champions for the season due to the ABL claiming Baltimore forfeited the league's championship series this season (though the Bullets claimed they had won the ABL's championship this season due to their overwhelming record this season instead). The combination of the way the ABL concluded their season with no proper championship series to go alongside the Baltimore Bullets defecting from the ABL into the rivaling Basketball Association of America (which later became the National Basketball Association) would cause the league to enter a serious decline in its reputation that it would ultimately never recover from.

== Roster ==
Due to information on American Basketball League players being generally hard to find (especially by the time the ABL was designated more as a minor league during its later years of existence), there are bound to be more gaps and/or inaccuracies found in certain areas on the team's roster spots than usual.

Player	Position(s)
Al Alberts	Unknown
Eddie Boyle	G/F
John Cerny	Unknown
Norm Drucker	G
Chili Edelstein	Unknown
Allie Esposito	G
Herbie Gershon	G
Gorham Getchell	C
Ben Goldfaden	F
Dick Gray	G/F
Marv Haspill	Unknown
Tony Nitti	Unknown
Red Paris	G/F
Al Rossi	G/F
Luke Sapan	Unknown
Al Schneider	G

Note: It's currently unknown what the team's final roster was once they entered the ABL Playoffs for this season.

== American Basketball League Season Standings ==
Due to the number of teams in the ABL this season, this would mark the first time since the 1927–28 season where the ABL would utilize divisions within their league in a proper manner, though unlike that season, the ABL would utilize a Northern Division and a Southern Division (which the Tigers competed in) instead of the typical Eastern Division and Western Division that had been on display for most other professional leagues at the time.

=== Northern Division ===
Pos.	Team	Wins	Losses	Win %
1	Brooklyn Gothams - y	24	10	.706
2	Jersey City Atoms - x	14	22	.389
3	Troy Celtics	13	22	.371
4	Paterson Crescents	11	23	.324
5	Newark Bobcats / Kingston Chiefs / Yonkers Chiefs^{a} †	7	17	.292

† – Did not survive the ABL season.

=== Southern Division ===
Pos.	Team	Wins	Losses	Win %
1	Baltimore Bullets - z	31	3	.919
2	Philadelphia SPHAs - x	19	14	.675
3	Trenton Tigers - x	17	17	.500
4	Elizabeth Braves - x	15	18	.455
5	Wilmington Bombers	15	20	.429

== ABL Playoffs ==
Due to the larger number of teams entering this season (the most in one ABL season, in fact), the ABL would set up a newer, larger playoff format for this season, with the intent of it involving "[t]he first team in each division will play in a series of the best three out of five games; the second place clubs in each division will play in a preliminary playoff series of the best two out of three games; the third and fourth place clubs in the official standing of the league at the termination of the 1946–1947 season, regardless of the division in which they are entered by computed on their percentage rating, will play in a preliminary series of the best two out of three games." Because of it, the newly-created quarterfinal round that would only appear in this season would have the Tigers (the #3 seeded Southern Division team) going up against the Elizabeth Braves (the #4 seeded Southern Division team) in a best-of-three series.

=== ABL Quarterfinals ===
(3S) Trenton Tigers Vs. (4S) Elizabeth Braves: Trenton wins series 2–0

- Game 1: March 16, 1947 @ Trenton: Trenton 67, Elizabeth 39
- Game 2: March 18, 1947 @ Elizabeth: Trenton 54, Elizabeth 52

=== ABL Semifinals ===
Due to how things would go about during this season, the semifinal round could unofficially be considered the championship round for the ABL this time around.

(3S) Trenton Tigers Vs. (2S) Philadelphia SPHAs: Trenton wins series 2–1

- Game 1: March 23, 1947 @ Trenton: Trenton 81, Philadelphia 64
- Game 2: April 2, 1947 @ Philadelphia: Philadelphia 46, Trenton 42
- Game 3: April 12, 1947 @ Trenton: Trenton 48, Philadelphia 46

=== ABL Championship Round ===
Originally, the ABL's championship series for this season was planned to be that of a proper championship series (one that likely was going to be set up in a best of five series) against the nearly undefeated #1 Northern seeded 31–3 Baltimore Bullets team that Trenton had previously beaten earlier in the season. However, due to a combination of the surprisingly longer than expected delay in the ABL Semifinals and the Bullets wanting to compete in the 1947 World Professional Basketball Tournament (which funnily enough ended around the time the ABL's semifinals officially concluded properly), the ABL decided to give Baltimore a forced forfeiture for this championship series, which ultimately led to the Trenton Tigers with their average 17–17 record being considered the league's champions by default this time around (which would be their first and only time they'd win the ABL's championship in their franchise's overall history (even if the ABL's reputation would be made smaller by this point in time), as well as become their last championship ever won in their overall combined history within multiple leagues (and potentially eras) as well). However, the Bullets would end up declaring themselves the personal champions of the ABL this season instead due to their aforementioned overwhelming 31–3 record on their ends. Not only that, but the anticlimactic way the ABL's season ended combined with its lowered presence this season and the (original) Baltimore Bullets decided to move to the newer, bigger rivals in the Basketball Association of America (and subsequently win the 1948 BAA Finals in their first season there) led to the ABL going into a massive downfall that it just couldn't recover from following this season's conclusion.

== Notes ==
^{a} The Newark Bobcats first transferred their franchise from Newark, New Jersey to Kingston, New York on December 23, 1946 (though they did not necessarily change their team name at the time (but if they did, they would have changed it to the Kingston Chiefs instead)) and then moved to nearby Yonkers, New York to become the Yonkers Chiefs on January 22, 1947 before folding operations entirely by the middle of February in 1947.
