= 1945–46 Trenton Tigers season =

- League: American Basketball League (revived original)
- Head coach: Teddy Kearns
- General manager: Girard Naples(?)
- Owner(s): Girard Naples
- Arena: Trenton Arena

Results
- Record: 14–20 (.412)
- Place: Conference: 5th
- Playoff finish: Did not qualify

The 1945–46 Trenton Tigers season was presumably the 33rd professional basketball season played by the Trenton Tigers (and their seventh professional season under the Tigers name properly after previously using the Nationals, Trentons, Potters, (Royal) Bengals, and (presumably) Moose team names alongside the merged season in the failed "original" National Basketball League as the Greenpoint Knights of St. Anthony/Trenton Royal Bengals and the combined season of play for the Trenton Bengals when they operated as both the Paterson Panthers earlier in the 1935–36 season and the Passaic Red Devils later in the 1935–36 season) of the revived original version of the American Basketball League. If their history truly went as far back as it has been (thus making them the oldest existing professional basketball team by this point in time), then this season would end up marking (at least) their 48th overall season of existence (though a season of play would end up being lost due to World War I, meaning it'd be closer to their 47th overall season of existence instead due to the "Great War" period resulting in a hiatus season of sorts), as well as their 26th overall professional basketball season with some sort of professional basketball league when combining the histories of all of these leagues with this season of play here. Regardless of the proper context for them, the Trenton Tigers would be one of six teams competing in the ABL this season, with this season not having any changes occurring with any teams whatsoever for its most stable season in this league's revival era due to World War II concluding before this season began properly. During this season, the Tigers would make a couple of notable trades with the Baltimore Bullets, who had previously upset them in the ABL Playoffs the previous season. Unfortunately for Trenton, those trades with the Bullets would backfire on the Tigers, as they would finish with a 14–20 record to get a fifth-place finish ahead of the Paterson Crescents (by one game), with the Trenton Tigers being one game behind the Wilmington Bombers for the fourth and final spot in the playoffs this season. By contrast, the trades Trenton did with Baltimore would cause the Bullets to win the ABL championship this season, with that Baltimore Bullets team later leaving the ABL to become a (champion) team for the newly created Basketball Association of America (now known as the National Basketball Association) not long afterward.

== Roster ==
Due to information on American Basketball League players being generally hard to find, there are bound to be more gaps and/or inaccuracies found in certain areas on the team's roster spots than usual.

Player	Position(s)
Ace Abbott	G/F
Mike Bloom	C
Tony Bodego	F/C
Eddie Boyle	F/C
Gerry Bussell	C
Larry Dodick	G/F
Dick Fitzgerald	G/F
Harry Fitzpatrick	G/F
Tom Flanagan	F/C
Herbie Gershon	G/F
Ben Goldfaden	F/C
Tom Gorman	G/F
Dick Gray	G/F
Earl Hafner	G/F
Bob Hassmiller	F/C
Mike McCarron	G/F
Jack McGuirk	G/F
Sam Mele	G/F
Irving Resnick	F/C
Al Rossi	G/F
Chubby Sherman	F/C
Lou Simon	G/F
Art Spector	F/C
Bob Tough	G/F
Virgil Vaughn	F/C

== American Basketball League Standings ==
Pos.	Team	Wins	Losses	Win %
T–1	Baltimore Bullets	21	13	.618
T–1	Philadelphia SPHAs	21	13	.618
3	New York Gothams	18	16	.529
4	Wilmington Bombers	15	19	.441
5	Trenton Tigers	14	20	.412
6	Paterson Crescents	13	21	.382
