= 1946–47 Baltimore Bullets season =

ABL professional basketball team season

- Division champions
- League: American Basketball League (revived original)
- Head coach: Buddy Jeannette (player-coach)
- Arena: Tenth Armory Regiment

Results
- Record: 31–3 (.912)
- Place: Division: 1st (Southern)
- Playoff finish: Forfeited championship round to Trenton Tigers; Lost first round in 1947 World Professional Basketball Tournament to Tri-Cities Blackhawks 57–46

The 1946–47 Baltimore Bullets season was the third and final season played by the original Baltimore Bullets (who are not related to the NBA team that is currently known as the Washington Wizards) when they were in the original American Basketball League (which was in its twentieth season of existence when combining the six seasons of its original run with the fourteen seasons in its more recent run at this point in time after their hiatus in relation to the Great Depression), especially since it would ultimately be the last season for that league being considered a professional basketball league that would rival operations alongside both the National Basketball League and the more recently created Basketball Association of America. This season would be notable for not just the team having the best record in ABL history with a 31–3 finish, but also having a controversial ABL championship forfeiture (where the Bullets would claim they were the true champions of the ABL this season instead of the Trenton Tigers) that subsequently led to them moving their operations into the Basketball Association of America (now National Basketball Association) for the rest of their existence.

== Season overview ==
After spending most of the franchise's first two seasons acting as the team's head coach (including playing for the team in their inaugural season as well), Red Rosan left the team. Rosan was replaced by a future Hall-of-Famer: former Fort Wayne Zollner Pistons player Buddy Jeannette, from the longtime rivaling National Basketball League (NBL). Jeannette was the team's newest player-coach, and brought much success to the team. During this season, which saw most of the other ABL teams losing many of its key talents to both the NBL and the newly-created Basketball Association of America (BAA), the Bullets had a monstrous 31–3 record (which would end up becoming the best record ever displayed in the ABL's entire history), with their only three losses throughout this regular season period occurring all within the Southern Division: on November 30, 1946, with a 68–63 loss to the Philadelphia Sphas; on December 12, 1946, with a 64–53 loss to the Trenton Tigers; and on February 1, 1947, with a 77–59 beatdown by the Philadelphia Sphas.

After Baltimore had a surprising scare in the first round of the 1947 ABL Playoffs by the Brooklyn Gothams before winning that series 2–1, the Bullets had wanted to get the ABL Finals underway a lot sooner than the ABL was intending to prepare themselves for their ends since the ABL had inexplicably left a major gap in-between Games 1 and 2 for when the Trenton Tigers and Philadelphia Sphas would play against each other and the Bullets had dealt with a bye in the semifinal round due to their first round match-up involving them competing against the #1 team in the Northern Division that year, the aforementioned Brooklyn Gothams. However, because of worn out patience (especially since they had key exhibition matches that they wanted to meet by the end of the season in order to make an appeal to the newly created Basketball Association of America become official, as it was later revealed to the general public) and the perceived notion by the Bullets that their record was too great for either championship opponent team to overcome this season in the ABL, the Bullets decided to personally declare themselves the champions of the 1946–47 ABL season (technically being considered back-to-back champions there in the process) in order to make themselves ready for entry into the 1947 World Professional Basketball Tournament that they wanted to participate in as well (which they wouldn't go far into this time around, funnily enough). As a result of the sudden decision by Baltimore's end, the ABL ended up deciding to declare that the Baltimore Bullets had officially forfeited their entry into the ABL championship series this time around, with them later marking the Trenton Tigers (who had held an average record themselves throughout the season) as the official champions of the ABL this season due to them defeating the Philadelphia Sphas 2–1 on the day after the World Professional Basketball Tournament for the year ended.

Following the wild and crazy circumstances that occurred throughout the ABL Playoffs this season, the Baltimore Bullets decided to defect from the ABL and applied to join up with the newly created (and rivaling) Basketball Association of America (later known as the National Basketball Association), with their application to the league being approved by the start of the 1947 BAA draft, which would later become the first ever NBA draft in league history. They would later become the only original American Basketball League team in its entire history to go and defect from the ABL to the BAA/NBA (as well as later win the 1948 BAA Finals, technically making them three-peat champions in their eyes), hence why the ABL is not considered a predecessor league to the NBA like the BAA or NBL are (or even the future created American Basketball Association). Not only that, but their sudden disqualification from the ABL Finals championship match-up by the ABL and subsequent defection from the ABL to the BAA (later NBA) would be seen as a major catalyst for the ABL turning itself from a major contending professional basketball league that had a bright future following World War II's end alongside their younger rivals in the community-driven, midwestern focused NBL and business-oriented, major city focused BAA to soon being seen as an amateur league in its later years before later folding operations altogether.

== Roster ==
Due to information on American Basketball League players being generally hard to find, there are bound to be more gaps and/or inaccuracies found in certain areas on the team's roster spots than usual.

1946–47 Baltimore Bullets roster
Players

Pos.	No.	Player	Height	Weight	DOB	From
G/F		Ace Abbott	6 ft 2 in (1.88 m)	190 lb (86 kg)	1917-03-20	CCNY
G/F		Jake Ahearn	6 ft 2 in (1.88 m)	185 lb (84 kg)	1918-01-06	St. John's
G		Steve Bagarus	6 ft 0 in (1.83 m)	173 lb (78 kg)	1919-09-19	Notre Dame
F/C		Mike Bloom	6 ft 6 in (1.98 m)	190 lb (86 kg)	1915-01-14	Temple
G		Franny Bock	6 ft 1 in (1.85 m)		1921-09-29	Loyola Maryland
F		Vic Bock	6 ft 3 in (1.91 m)		1920-08-31	Loyola Maryland
F		Leon Brown	6 ft 3 in (1.91 m)	190 lb (86 kg)	1919-10-12	Wyoming
G/F		Moe Dubilier	6 ft 2 in (1.88 m)	210 lb (95 kg)	1915-02-20	John Marshall University
G		Herm Fuetsch	6 ft 0 in (1.83 m)	170 lb (77 kg)	1918-07-06	Polytechnic HS (CA)
F/C		Barney Goldberg	6 ft 5 in (1.96 m)		1921-10-14	Loyola Maryland
F/C		Kleggie Hermsen	6 ft 9 in (2.06 m)	225 lb (102 kg)	1923-03-12	Minnesota
G		Buddy Jeannette	5 ft 11 in (1.80 m)	175 lb (79 kg)	1917-09-15	Washington & Jefferson
G		Tony Kelly	6 ft 1 in (1.85 m)	165 lb (75 kg)	1919-02-18	DePaul
F		Bill McKeever	6 ft 3 in (1.91 m)	190 lb (86 kg)	1926-03-29	St. John's

Coaches
Head coach

Buddy Jeannette

Legend
- (DP) Unsigned draft pick
- (FA) Free agent
- (S) Suspended
- Injured

Roster

Their official roster for the 1947 World Professional Basketball Tournament (and presumably the 1947 ABL Playoffs as well) involved Ace Abbott (born Ace Goldsmith), Jake Ahearn, Mike Bloom, Herm Fuetsch, Kleggie Hermsen, player-coach Buddy Jeannette, Tony Kelly, and Bill McKeever.

== ABL Season Standings ==
Due to the number of teams in the ABL this season, this would mark the first time since the 1927–28 season where the ABL would utilize divisions within their league in a proper manner, though unlike that season, the ABL would utilize a Northern Division and a Southern Division (which the Bullets competed in) instead of the typical Eastern Division and Western Division that had been on display for most other professional leagues at the time.

=== Northern Division ===
Pos.	Team	Wins	Losses	Win %
1	Brooklyn Gothams - y	24	10	.706
2	Jersey City Atoms - x	14	22	.389
3	Troy Celtics	13	22	.371
4	Paterson Crescents	11	23	.324
5	Newark Bobcats / Kingston Chiefs / Yonkers Chiefs†	7	17	.292

† – Did not survive the ABL season. (The Newark Bobcats first transferred their franchise from Newark, New Jersey to Kingston, New York on December 23, 1946 to become the Kingston Chiefs (which was less known to people at the time since most people would think they kept the Newark Bobcats name at the time) and then moved to nearby Yonkers, New York to become the Yonkers Chiefs on January 22, 1947, before folding operations entirely by the middle of February in 1947.)

=== Southern Division ===
Pos.	Team	Wins	Losses	Win %
1	Baltimore Bullets - z	31	3	.919
2	Philadelphia Sphas - x	19	14	.675
3	Trenton Tigers - x	17	17	.500
4	Elizabeth Braves - x	15	18	.455
5	Wilmington Bombers	15	20	.429

== ABL Playoffs ==
Due to the larger number of teams entering this season (the most in one ABL season, in fact), the ABL would set up a newer, larger playoff format for this season, with the intent of it involving "[t]he first team in each division will play in a series of the best three out of five games; the second place clubs in each division will play in a preliminary playoff series of the best two out of three games; the third and fourth place clubs in the official standing of the league at the termination of the 1946–1947 season, regardless of the division in which they are entered by computed on their percentage rating, will play in a preliminary series of the best two out of three games." Because of it, the newly-created quarterfinal round that would only appear in this season would have the 31–3 Baltimore Bullets (the #1 seeded Southern Division team) going up against the Brooklyn Gothams (the #1 seeded Northern Division team) in a best-of-three series.

=== ABL First Round ===
(1S) Baltimore Bullets vs. (1N) Brooklyn Gothams: Baltimore wins series 2–1

- Game 1: March 13, 1947 @ Baltimore: Brooklyn 80, Baltimore 66
- Game 2: March 16, 1947 @ Brooklyn: Baltimore 80, Brooklyn 53 (game was played in Paterson, New Jersey)
- Game 3: March 20, 1947 @ Baltimore: Baltimore 70, Brooklyn 46

=== ABL Semifinals ===
Baltimore was given a bye in the semifinal round due to the weird placement of the ABL Playoffs this time around. (The first round saw the two best teams from each division compete against each other in their own round (with the winner being planned to have a direct bye into the championship round there), while the second-best teams from each division competed against each other with the winner of that round going into the semifinal round to compete against the third and fourth best teams in the Southern Division in this case, with the semifinal round being the second and third best teams from the Southern Division competing against each other to try and knock out the best team in the Southern Division in the championship round as the initial plan there.)

=== ABL Championship Round ===
Baltimore was ultimately disqualified from participating in the 1947 ABL championship round due to them feeling as though the ABL was taking too long in setting up the semifinal round properly and they wanted the ABL's championship to be as quick as possible so they could have a chance to participate in the 1947 World Professional Basketball Tournament. However, because of a lack of patience, especially in regards to the time spent between Games 1 and 2 in the semifinal round (Game 1 began on March 23, 1947, while Game 2 happened on April 7, 1947), combined with the perceived notion that the Bullets' record was considered too great for either competitor to overcome this season, the Baltimore Bullets ended up declaring themselves the champions of the 1946–47 ABL season (and by extension, considered themselves back-to-back champions of the ABL) in order to allow themselves to compete in the 1947 World Professional Basketball Tournament. Ironically, the semifinal round for the ABL officially ended on April 12, 1947, with the Trenton Tigers winning the semifinal round series over the Philadelphia Sphas just one day after the WPBT officially ended this year, meaning that the ABL could have potentially accommodated the Bullets' wishes to have them compete in the ABL's championship series properly this season while also competing in the WPBT beforehand. Regardless, the treatment of the championship series by the ABL was slated to be a factor to not just the Baltimore Bullets leaving the ABL for the Basketball Association of America (now known as the National Basketball Association), but also toward the ABL's general decline in perception as a professional basketball league by the late 1940s and early 1950s.

== World Professional Basketball Tournament ==
Because the Baltimore Bullets had both an overwhelming record in the American Basketball League this season and were entering the 1947 World Professional Basketball Tournament that was held in Chicago as the ongoing league champions of the ABL at the time it was going on (to the point where they had personally considered themselves as official back-to-back ABL champions despite the league's rulings on the Bullets entering the WPBT over staying put for the ABL's championship tournament was officially considered a disqualification for said championship on the ABL's end), the Bullets would enter the World Professional Basketball Tournament on April 7–11, 1947 as the ABL's sole representative of the WPBT alongside the Portland Indians being the sole representative of the recently created (yet briefly existing) Pacific Coast Professional Basketball League as the two black sheep competitors of the WPBT against the rest of the event's grouping of independently ran teams and National Basketball League teams. In the first round, the Bullets would go up against the NBL's own Tri-Cities Blackhawks, who had an interesting season of their own accord by originally starting the season out in Buffalo, New York as the Buffalo Bisons (not related to a previously existing Buffalo Bisons team that existed in both the NBL and ABL) before they moved to the small town of Moline, Illinois that represented what was known as the "Tri-Cities" area of the time alongside Rock Island, Illinois and Davenport, Iowa by Christmas 1946. Unlike the Bullets, however, the Bisons turned Blackhawks would not be a playoff team since they did not finish their NBL season with a winning record at all. Despite the overwhelming odds that would be stacked against the Tri-Cities and being more in favor of Baltimore, the Bullets would surprisingly end up being upset by the Blackhawks in a 57–46 defeat in what later became Baltimore's final game played in that tournament (though it wouldn't be the last time the Bullets would play the Blackhawks in general since the two teams would later face off against each other in the National Basketball Association when the Bullets and Blackhawks left their original respective leagues for the BAA/NBA, with them playing against each other from 1949 to 1954 when the original Bullets franchise ended up folding operations (though the Blackhawks would later move to Milwaukee to become the Milwaukee Hawks first, with the Hawks still surviving to this day as the Atlanta Hawks)).

=== Game Played ===
- Lost first round (46–57) to the Tri-Cities Blackhawks.
