= 1949–50 Schenectady Packers season =

American Basketball League season

- League: American Basketball League (revived original)
- Head coach: Honey Russell
- General manager: Hank Bozzi & Si Etkin
- Owner(s): Hank Bozzi & Si Etkin
- Arena: Schenectady Armory

Results
- Record: 0–4 (.000)
- Place: Conference: 8th
- Playoff finish: Did not qualify. (Dropped out of the ABL early in the season on November 23, 1949.)

The 1949–50 Schenectady Packers season was the first and only season of play for the Schenectady Packers from Schenectady, New York in the revived (yet struggling) original version of the American Basketball League. However, the team did previously have a competitive history in the more minor New York State Professional Basketball League, with them first competing as the Schenectady Comets before becoming the Schenectady Packers in their final season in the New York-based league. In any case, the team entered the ABL as one of eight teams competing in the ABL as they were struggling to remain relevant as a professional basketball in terms of competition from both the newly-merged National Basketball Association (who had merged the operations of the younger, yet more citywide populated Basketball Association of America and the older, more established National Basketball League to create the NBA) and other minor leagues for the sport at the time like the Eastern Professional Basketball League, with the latter league looking to gain more relevancy themselves in their own early years of existence. However, after playing in only four (or six) games for the season, all of which ended up becoming (awful) losses for Schenectady (with their worst loss being a blowout 108–69 defeat to the two-time defending ABL champion Wilkes-Barre Barons), the Packers decided to leave the ABL entirely on November 23, 1949, with them folding operations as a franchise not long afterward. They were later joined by the Trenton Tigers turned Cohoes Marras as the only other team to fold operations this season, thus continuing the ABL's struggles that had first begun ever since the 1946–47 season. Interestingly, this season would feature former City College of New York guard Lou Lipman (alternatively known as Louis Lipman) as a player on their team; Lipman would have his only professional basketball season played this season while competing with Schenectady (and later, the Hartford Hurricanes) this season before being arrested as one of 34 (later 35) players to be involved in the 1951 college basketball point-shaving scandal.

== Roster ==
Due to information on American Basketball League players being generally hard to find (especially by the time the ABL was designated more as a minor league during its later years of existence), there are bound to be more gaps and/or inaccuracies found in certain areas on the team's roster spots than usual.

Player	Position(s)
Hank Beenders	C/F
Dick Bennett	Unknown
Bob Fitzgerald	F/C
Jack Garfinkel	G
Chuck Harmon	G
Larry Killick	Unknown
Don Kotter	C
Lou Lipman	G
Vic Mastriani	PG
Mike McCarron	G
Roy Peters	Unknown
Bill Pless	F/C
Walt Przybylo	Unknown
Irv Rothenberg	C
Johnny Simmons	G
Tony Sisti	Unknown
Red Wallace	G
George Zelie	Unknown

== American Basketball League Standings ==
Pos.	Team	Wins	Losses	Win %
1	Scranton Miners	27	11	.711
2	Bridgeport Aer-A-Sols	22	13	.629
3	Wilkes-Barre Barons	21	17	.552
4	New York / Saratoga Harlem Yankees*^{[a]}	21	17	.552
5	Paterson Crescents	17	18	.486
6	Hartford Hurricanes	11	26	.297
7	Trenton Tigers / Cohoes Marras**†^{[b]}	4	16	.200
8	Schenectady Packers†^{[c]}	0	4	.000

† – Did not survive the ABL season.
* – The New York Harlem Yankees moved to Saratoga, New York (though they presumably played some of their games in Schenectady, New York) during the season.
** – The Trenton Tigers would end up moving to Cohoes, New York after being without a home venue for a month straight before later folding operations without winning a single game in Cohoes under their new Cohoes Marras name.

== Notes ==
^{a} The New York Harlem Yankees moved to Saratoga, New York (though they presumably played some of their games in Schenectady, New York) to become the Saratoga Harlem Yankees at some currently unknown point in time during this season.
^{b} The Trenton Tigers would move to Cohoes, New York to become the Cohoes Marras on January 7, 1950 after previously playing as a road team only from December 11-28, 1949 (with their road trip leading to nothing but defeats) before the Trenton Tigers turned Cohoes Marras folded operations by either January 30 or February 1, 1950.
^{c} The Schenectady Packers would end up dropping out of the ABL on November 23, 1949.
