= 1947–48 Trenton Tigers season =

American Basketball League season

- League: American Basketball League (revived original)
- Head coach: Herbie Gershon (4–5); Leroy "Red" Smith (13–10)
- General manager: Girard Naples(?)
- Owner(s): Girard Naples
- Arena: Trenton Arena

Results
- Record: 17–15 (.531)
- Place: Conference: 3rd
- Playoff finish: Lost ABL semifinals 2-0 to the Wilkes-Barre Barons

The 1947–48 Trenton Tigers season was presumably the 35th professional basketball season played by the Trenton Tigers (and their ninth professional season under the Tigers name properly after previously using the Nationals, Trentons, Potters, (Royal) Bengals, and (presumably) Moose team names alongside the merged season in the failed "original" National Basketball League as the Greenpoint Knights of St. Anthony/Trenton Royal Bengals and the combined season of play for the Trenton Bengals when they operated as both the Paterson Panthers earlier in the 1935–36 season and the Passaic Red Devils later in the 1935–36 season) of the revived original version of the American Basketball League. If their history truly went as far back as it has been (thus making them the oldest existing professional basketball team by this point in time), then this season would end up marking (at least) their 50th overall season of existence (though a season of play would end up being lost due to World War I, meaning it'd be closer to their 49th overall season of existence instead due to the "Great War" period resulting in a hiatus season of sorts), as well as their 28th overall professional basketball season with some sort of professional basketball league when combining the histories of all of these leagues with this season of play here. Regardless of the proper context for them, the Trenton Tigers would officially be considered the defending champions of the league (despite what the Baltimore Bullets thought on their ends), with the ABL decreasing in quality as only eight teams would start out the season without any divisions in mind to start the season out, with one of them in the Lancaster (Red) Roses leaving the ABL for the more minor Eastern Pennsylvania Basketball League early on in the season. After Herbie Gershon left the team as a player-coach after a below-average start to the season with nine games played, Leroy "Red" Smith would take over as the new head coach for the rest of the season, with him helping lead the Tigers to an above-average 17–15 record (with a 13–10 record under his tenure) for a third-place finish behind only the upstart Paterson Crescents and the inaugural EPBL champion Wilkes-Barre Barons. While Trenton would once again qualify for the ABL Playoffs this season, they would soon see how much of a talent gap there was between themselves and the returning Wilkes-Barre Barons, as the Barons would sweep the defending champion Tigers in the semifinal round, with Wilkes-Barre soon becoming the new ABL champions not long afterward.

== Roster ==
Due to information on American Basketball League players being generally hard to find (especially by the time the ABL was designated more as a minor league during its later years of existence), there are bound to be more gaps and/or inaccuracies found in certain areas on the team's roster spots than usual.

Player	Position(s)
Eddie Boyle	G/F
Paul Chadick	G/F
Chili Edelstein	Unknown
Frank Frascella	Unknown
Herbie Gershon	G
Gorham Getchell	C
Ben Goldfaden	F
Ed Golub	Unknown
Jack Hewson	F/C
Bob Kelly	Unknown
Mike McCarron	G
Sam "Barucci" Roth	Unknown
Al Schneider	G
Virgil Vaughn	F/C
Bill Zirkel	Unknown

== American Basketball League Standings ==
Due to the decreased number of teams this season, the ABL would remove divisions from their league this season going forward after previously using them for their previous season of play.

Pos.	Team	Wins	Losses	Win %
1	Wilkes-Barre Barons	26	8	.765
2	Paterson Crescents	19	16	.543
3	Trenton Tigers	17	15	.531
4	Jersey City Atoms / Scranton Miners^{[a]}	16	16	.500
5	Elizabeth Braves / Hartford Hurricanes^{[b]}	11	12	.478
6	Philadelphia SPHAs	13	19	.406
7	Brooklyn Gothams	8	20	.286
8	Lancaster (Red) Roses^{[c]}	1	5	.167

== American Basketball League Playoffs ==
For the American Basketball League during this season's playoffs, instead of operating like what the rivaling Basketball Association of America had done, the ABL's playoff formatting would be similar to what the rivaling National Basketball League had done in the past.

=== American Basketball League Semifinals ===
(3) Trenton Tigers Vs. (1) Wilkes-Barre Barons: Wilkes-Barre wins series 2–0

- Game 1: March 24, 1948 @ Wilkes-Barre: Wilkes-Barre 53, Trenton 52
- Game 2: March 28, 1948 @ Trenton: Wilkes-Barre 102, Trenton 84

== Notes ==
^{a} Originally, the Jersey City Atoms would move from Jersey City, New Jersey to nearby Union City, New Jersey on January 16, 1948 (though it doesn't appear that the Jersey City Atoms rebranded their team by this point in time) before moving again to Scranton, Pennsylvania to become the Scranton Miners twelve days later on January 28, 1948, for the rest of the season going forward.
^{b} The Elizabeth Braves would move from Elizabeth, New Jersey to Hartford, Connecticut on December 19, 1947, to become the Hartford Hurricanes for the rest of the season.
^{c} The Lancaster Roses (sometimes referred to as the Lancaster Red Roses instead) would end up withdrawing their operations from the ABL early in the season on December 4, 1947, to return to the Eastern Professional Basketball League not long afterward.
