= 1928–29 Trenton Royal Bengals season =

American basketball team season

- League: American Basketball League (original)
- Head coach: Tom Barlow (6–9); Harry Hough (4–6); Lou Sugarman (6–9)
- Arena: Trenton Arena

Results
- Record: 16–24 (.400)
- Place: Conference: 6th (both halves)
- Playoff finish: Did not qualify

The 1928–29 Trenton Royal Bengals season was (technically) the only professional basketball season of the Royal Bengals franchise held in the capital city of Trenton, New Jersey during the fourth season of existence for the American Basketball League, which was the first professional basketball league that had truly attempted to go fully national after previous professional basketball leagues were mostly regional at the time. However, Trenton's history as a franchise had supposedly lasted as far back as 1898 (only seven years after James Naismith created the sport of basketball himself) back when the team first played in the very first professional basketball league of its time in the National Basket Ball League (with the sport having a space in its name at the time) back when Trenton played as the Trenton Nationals, the Trenton Trentons, and the Trenton Potters there, as well as the Eastern Basketball League under the Trenton Potters, the Trenton Royal Bengals, and the Trenton Tigers, the Metropolitan Basketball League as the Trenton Royal Bengals, and even their brief stint in the "original" National Basketball League for good measure where they collaborated with the Greenpoint Knights of St. Anthony to become the Greenpoint Knights of St. Anthony/Trenton Royal Bengals in that league; if their history truly went as far back as it has been (thus making them the oldest existing professional basketball team by this point in time), then this season would end up marking their 30th overall season of existence (though a season of play would end up being lost due to World War I, meaning it'd be closer to their 29th overall season of existence instead due to the "Great War" period resulting in a hiatus season of sorts), as well as their 24th overall professional basketball season with some sort of professional basketball league when combining the histories of all of these leagues with this season of play here. Regardless of the overall sentiment at hand here, Trenton's franchise would be one of eight teams competing in the ABL this season, which would return to a split season format after previously using a proper regular season and playoff formatting. Not only that, but the Royal Bengals would be considered one of the weaker teams competing within the ABL this season (despite them being flippantly against the general rules of the ABL due to them utilizing a wire cage to surround the basketball court in their home games when other teams weren't allowed to use cages in their matches), as they would end up finishing in sixth place throughout the entire season.

In the first half of the season, the Royal Bengals would end up being one game shy from tying the New York Hakoahs (who took over the spot of the Original Celtics for this season) to get a below-average 12–16 record, being ahead of only the Rochester Centrals and the newly-added Paterson Whirlwinds for that half of the season. However, they also saw the most coaching changes occur throughout the entire season, as they would go from player-coach Tom Barlow in the first half of the season to (long-time) head coach Harry Hough for the middle of the first half of the season to player-coach Lou Sugarman for the rest of the season following the end of the first half of the season. When it came to the second half of the season, it wouldn't be any better from the first half of the season, as they would end up getting a below-average 4–8 record to finish in sixth place there, this time being ahead of only the Chicago Bruins and the Paterson Whirlwinds, easily failing to qualify for the ABL's championship series. Following this season's conclusion, the Royal Bengals would decide to exit out of the ABL entirely, with Trenton later appearing in the minor Tri-State Basketball League as the Trenton Bengals before presumably never appearing in their original state ever again. However, it's suggested that the Trenton (Royal) Bengals would later operate as the Trenton Moose in both the Eastern Basketball League (which would technically not be related to the version that the (Royal) Bengals/Tigers previously competed in) and the revived version of the ABL, with the Trenton Bengals also later reappearing in the 1935–36 season under part of the existence of both the Paterson Panthers and the Passaic Red Devils. Not only that, but it's also suggested that the same Trenton team later appeared in the revived ABL as the Trenton Tigers from 1941 up until January 30, 1950 before folding operations for good by then as the Cohoes Marras in Cohoes, New York under their final season of play in the ABL.

== Roster ==
Due to information on American Basketball League players being generally hard to find, there are bound to be more gaps and/or inaccuracies found in certain areas on the team's roster spots than usual.

Player	Position
Paulie Adamo	F
Jimmy Ahlbach	G
Tom Barlow	G
Soup Campbell	F
Al Cooper	F/C
Frank DeBoskey	F
Peanuts Gorczynski	G
Mark Harper	C
Teddy Kearns	G/F
Al Kellett	F/C
Stretch Meehan	C
Mount Norris	G
Chickie Passon	F
Frank Radice	G/F
Lou Sugarman	G/F
Jerry Sullivan	G/F
Freddie Wesslock	G/F

== American Basketball League Standings ==
First Half
Team	Wins	Losses	Winning %
Cleveland Rosenblums	19	9	.679
Fort Wayne Hoosiers	18	10	.643
Brooklyn Visitations	15	12	.556
Chicago Bruins	15	12	.556
New York Hakoahs	13	16	.448
Trenton (Royal) Bengals	12	16	.429
Rochester Centrals	11	15	.423
Paterson Whirlwinds	6	19	.240

Second Half
Team	Wins	Losses	Winning %
Fort Wayne Hoosiers	11	3	.786
Cleveland Rosenblums	10	4	.714
Brooklyn Visitations	10	4	.714
Rochester Centrals	7	7	.500
New York Hakoahs	5	9	.357
Trenton (Royal) Bengals	4	8	.333
Chicago Bruins	4	10	.286
Paterson Whirlwinds	3	9	.250
