= 1949–50 Trenton Tigers / Cohoes Marras season =

American basketball team season

- League: American Basketball League (revived original)
- Head coach: Leroy "Red" Smith (3–5); Angelo Musi (1–4); Irv Torgoff (0–4); Marv Blumenthal (0–2); Kelly Brofman (0–1)
- Owner(s): Girard Naples (Trenton); Unknown for Cohoes (Girard Naples also?)
- Arena: Trenton Arena (Trenton); Unknown for the Cohoes Marras (Harmony Mills?)

Results
- Record: 4–16 (.200)
- Place: Conference: N/A (Unofficially 7th)
- Playoff finish: Did not qualify. (The Trenton Tigers / Cohoes Marras folded operations on February 1, 1950.)

The 1949–50 Trenton Tigers / Cohoes Marras season was (presumably) the 37th and final professional basketball season played by the Trenton Tigers (and their eleventh professional season under the Tigers name properly after previously using the Nationals, Trentons, Potters, (Royal) Bengals, and (presumably) Moose team names alongside the merged season in the failed "original" National Basketball League as the Greenpoint Knights of St. Anthony/Trenton Royal Bengals and the combined season of play for the Trenton Bengals when they operated as both the Paterson Panthers earlier in the 1935–36 season and the Passaic Red Devils later in the 1935–36 season, though this season was the only season where the Tigers moved from Trenton, New Jersey to Cohoes, New York to become the Cohoes Marras after losing their home court venue and playing on the road for a month straight) of the revived original version of the American Basketball League. If their history truly went as far back as it has been (thus making them the oldest existing professional basketball team by this point in time), then this season would end up marking (at least) their 52nd and final overall season of existence (though a season of play would end up being lost due to World War I, meaning it'd be closer to their 51st and final overall season of existence instead due to the "Great War" period resulting in a hiatus season of sorts), as well as their 30th and final overall professional basketball season with some sort of professional basketball league when combining the histories of all of these leagues with this season of play here. Regardless of the proper context for them, the Trenton Tigers / Cohoes Marras would be one of eight teams competing in the weakened up version of the ABL to compete for the league's championship under its 23rd overall season of play. Originally, the Tigers would compete in a somewhat respectable manner with a 4–5 record (though they would already replace Leroy "Red" Smith with player-coach Angelo Musi before getting their last win for the franchise in this season). However, they would end up being without a home for a month straight following their last win as a franchise on December 11, 1949, as they would continue playing on the road until their last game as the Trenton Tigers on December 28 before they officially moved to Cohoes, New York (without playing as the Tigers in 1950) to become the Cohoes Marras by January 7, 1950. Unfortunately for the now-rebranded Marras, they would end still end up struggling both in terms of play and from a financial standpoint, as Cohoes would go winless in the rest of the season that they played in (including more coaching changes once Angelo Musi was replaced there) before they folded operations for good by either the end of January or the start of February in 1950. The closure of the Trenton Tigers turned Cohoes Marras franchise would lead to the ABL ending the season with only six competitive teams for the rest of that season going forward, thus continuing their struggling issues that occurred for the league since the 1946–47 season.

== Roster ==
Due to information on American Basketball League players being generally hard to find (especially by the time the ABL was designated more as a minor league during its later years of existence), there are bound to be more gaps and/or inaccuracies found in certain areas on the team's roster spots than usual. As such, any players that don't have a listed position at hand will be labeled as unknown here.

Player	Position(s)
Mason Benson	Unknown
Martin "Kelly" Brofman	Unknown
Stan Brown	F
Brownie Carroll	G
George Feigenbaum	G
Frank Fraschilla	Unknown
Bobby Glenn	Unknown
Dick Hammond	Unknown
Jack Hewson	F/C
Sonny Jameson	Unknown
Herb Klautblatt	G
Eddie Lyons	Unknown
Frank Martello	Unknown
Jack McLaughlin	Unknown
Angelo Musi	G
Jim Pemrick	Unknown
Fred Price	Unknown
Sam "Barucci" Roth	Unknown
Jerry Rullo	G
Butch Schwartz	G/F
Burt Silverman	Unknown
Bob Smith	F/C
Irv Torgoff	G/F
Bob Tough	G/F

== American Basketball League Standings ==
Pos.	Team	Wins	Losses	Win %
1	Scranton Miners	27	11	.711
2	Bridgeport Aer-A-Sols	22	13	.629
3	Wilkes-Barre Barons	21	17	.552
4	New York / Saratoga Harlem Yankees*^{[a]}	20	17	.542
5	Paterson Crescents	17	18	.486
6	Hartford Hurricanes	11	26	.297
7	Trenton Tigers / Cohoes Marras**†^{[b]}	4	16	.200
8	Schenectady Packers†^{[c]}	0	4	.000

† – Did not survive the ABL season.
* – The New York Harlem Yankees moved to Saratoga, New York (though they presumably played some of their games in Schenectady, New York) during the season.
** – The Trenton Tigers would end up moving to Cohoes, New York after being without a home venue for a month straight before later folding operations without winning a single game in Cohoes under their new Cohoes Marras name.

== Notes ==
^{a} The New York Harlem Yankees moved to Saratoga, New York (though they presumably played some of their games in Schenectady, New York) to become the Saratoga Harlem Yankees at some currently unknown point in time during this season.
^{b} The Trenton Tigers would move to Cohoes, New York to become the Cohoes Marras on January 7, 1950 after previously playing as a road team only from December 11-28, 1949 (with their road trip leading to nothing but defeats) before the Trenton Tigers turned Cohoes Marras folded operations by either January 30 or February 1, 1950.
^{c} The Schenectady Packers would end up dropping out of the ABL on November 23, 1949.
