= 1946–47 Elizabeth Braves season =

American Basketball League season

- League: American Basketball League (revived original)
- Head coach: Abner West (4–3); Leo Merson (11–15)
- General manager: Abner West(?); Leo Merson(?)
- Arena: Unknown (Elizabeth Armory?)

Results
- Record: 15–18 (.455)
- Place: Division: 4th (Southern)
- Playoff finish: Lost ABL Quarterfinals 2-0 to the Trenton Tigers

The 1946–47 Elizabeth Braves season was the inaugural season of the Elizabeth Braves franchise from Elizabeth, New Jersey in the revived form of the American Basketball League. Entering this season, the Braves would be involved with the ABL's biggest point of existence in its entire overall history as an expansion franchise for this season, with ten total teams competing in the newly created Northern and Southern divisions (instead of using the typical Eastern and Western divisions like the ABL had done back in the 1927–28 season), with five teams being in the Northern Division and five teams (including Elizabeth) being in the Southern Division. Similar to how most teams in the ABL would perform this season (due in part to their decision to schedule most of their games on the weekend period of time due to their players being paid well in their regular jobs outside of the ABL instead of trying to compete against both of the rivaling National Basketball League and the newly created Basketball Association of America in that regard), the Braves would end up struggling throughout the season due to the constant roster turnover that they would have to deal with. Because of that, Elizabeth would end their first season of play with a below-average 15–18 record for a fourth-place finish in the Southern Division ahead of only the Wilmington Bombers there, though unlike most of the other struggling ABL teams this season, the Braves would end up qualifying for the ABL Playoffs in their debut season due to the unique formatting of the ABL Playoffs for this season, with Elizabeth going up against the #3 seeded Trenton Tigers (who had an average 17–17 record in the Southern Division) in the quarterfinal round. Unfortunately for the Braves, they would end up being swept by the Tigers in two quick games from that early series, with Trenton later being named the surprising league champions of the season following their semifinal round upset victory over the #2 seeded Philadelphia SPHAs due (at least in part) to the nearly undefeated #1 seeded Baltimore Bullets being considered disqualified for the ABL's championship series due to them competing in the 1947 World Professional Basketball Tournament (with the Bullets later moving to the newly-rivaling Basketball Association of America (now National Basketball Association) by the end of the season in relation to that controversial move).

== Roster ==
Due to information on American Basketball League players being generally hard to find (especially by the time the ABL was designated more as a minor league during its later years of existence), there are bound to be more gaps and/or inaccuracies found in certain areas on the team's roster spots than usual.

Player	Position(s)
Larry Baxter	Unknown
Herb Bloom	Unknown
Bill Bornheimer	F/C
Bob Cluggish	C
Jack Cusick	G
Johnny Danyo	G/F
Ralph Dolgoff	Unknown
Bobby Dorn	C
Frank Fucarino	F
Hy Gotkin	G/F
Jack Hewson	F/C
Steve Juenger	F/C
Bill Kotsores	Unknown
Freddy Kunz	Unknown
Lenny Lesser	Unknown
Frank Mangiapane	G
Ross Merrick	Unknown
Leo Merson	F
Al Moschetti	F
Dick Murphy	G
George Patsushok	G
Les Rothman	G/F
Paul Walker	Unknown
Stan Waxman	G
Jimmy White	G

Note: In addition to them, there was also an unknown player with the last name of Kane that was briefly on the team as well. However, it's currently unknown what the final roster for the Elizabeth Braves was for this team during the ABL Playoffs for this season.

== American Basketball League Season Standings ==
Due to the number of teams in the ABL this season, this would mark the first time since the 1927–28 season where the ABL would utilize divisions within their league in a proper manner, though unlike that season, the ABL would utilize a Northern Division and a Southern Division (which the Braves competed in) instead of the typical Eastern Division and Western Division that had been on display for most other professional leagues at the time.

=== Northern Division ===
Pos.	Team	Wins	Losses	Win %
1	Brooklyn Gothams - y	24	10	.706
2	Jersey City Atoms - x	14	22	.389
3	Troy Celtics	13	22	.371
4	Paterson Crescents	11	23	.324
5	Newark Bobcats / Kingston Chiefs / Yonkers Chiefs^{a} †	7	17	.292

† – Did not survive the ABL season.

=== Southern Division ===
Pos.	Team	Wins	Losses	Win %
1	Baltimore Bullets - z	31	3	.919
2	Philadelphia Sphas - x	19	14	.675
3	Trenton Tigers - x	17	17	.500
4	Elizabeth Braves - x	15	18	.455
5	Wilmington Bombers	15	20	.429

== American Basketball League Playoffs ==
Due to the larger number of teams entering this season (the most in one ABL season, in fact), the ABL would set up a newer, larger playoff format for this season, with the intent of it involving "[t]he first team in each division will play in a series of the best three out of five games; the second place clubs in each division will play in a preliminary playoff series of the best two out of three games; the third and fourth place clubs in the official standing of the league at the termination of the 1946–1947 season, regardless of the division in which they are entered by computed on their percentage rating, will play in a preliminary series of the best two out of three games." Because of it, the newly created quarterfinal round that would only appear in this season would have the Elizabeth Braves (the #4 seeded Southern Division team) going up against the Trenton Tigers (the #3 seeded Southern Division team) in a best-of-three series.

=== ABL Quarterfinals ===
(4S) Elizabeth Braves Vs. (3S) Trenton Tigers: Trenton wins series 2–0

- Game 1: March 16, 1947 @ Trenton: Trenton 67, Elizabeth 39
- Game 2: March 18, 1947 @ Elizabeth: Trenton 54, Elizabeth 52

== Notes ==
^{a} The Newark Bobcats first transferred their franchise from Newark, New Jersey to Kingston, New York on December 23, 1946 (though they did not necessarily change their team name at the time (but if they did, they would have changed it to the Kingston Chiefs instead)) and then moved to nearby Yonkers, New York to become the Yonkers Chiefs on January 22, 1947, before folding operations entirely by the middle of February in 1947.
