= 1948–49 Trenton Tigers season =

American Basketball League season

- League: American Basketball League (revived original)
- Head coach: Teddy Kearns
- General manager: Girard Naples(?)
- Owner(s): Girard Naples
- Arena: Trenton Arena

Results
- Record: 25–16 (.610)
- Place: Conference: 3rd
- Playoff finish: Lost ABL semifinals 2-0 to the Wilkes-Barre Barons

The 1948–49 Trenton Tigers season was the Trenton Tigers' last full season in the revived American Basketball League. Regardless of the proper context for them, the Trenton Tigers would be one of eight teams once again competing for the ABL's championship this season (though in this case, they would hope to reclaim it after winning it all in a controversial manner back in 1947), with the Bridgeport Newfield Steelers from the 1948 World Professional Basketball Tournament taking over the spot previously held by the Lancaster (Red) Roses and the long-standing Philadelphia Sphas moving to Atlantic City, New Jersey to become the Atlantic City Tides for a majority of this season. This season also saw them bring back Teddy Kearns to be their head coach once again this season after he previously was let go in their previous two seasons of play. On the surface level, it would look like it was a successful move for the Tigers with a 25–16 record for a third-place finish behind only the Scranton Miners and the new defending ABL champions in the Wilkes-Barre Barons to once again qualify for the ABL Playoffs. However, even with this new coaching change, Trenton would still not have the talent in their roster to overcome the Barons in the semifinal round. Wilkes-Barre swept the Tigers 2–0 and then beat the Scranton Miners for a second straight ABL title. Unbeknownst to the team and the rest of the ABL, this would later end up becoming the team's final full season of play in the process.

== Roster ==
Due to information on American Basketball League players being generally hard to find (especially by the time the ABL was designated more as a minor league during its later years of existence), there are bound to be more gaps and/or inaccuracies found in certain areas on the team's roster spots than usual.

Player	Position(s)
Eddie Boyle	G/F
Paul Chadick	G/F
George Feigenbaum	G
Frank Frascella	Unknown
Earl Hafner	G/F
Jack Hewson	F/C
Dutch Hoefer	G
Joe Howard	Unknown
Jerry Kelly	F
Herb Klautblatt	G
Mike McCarron	G
Jack McLaughlin	Unknown
Fred Price	Unknown
Al Rossi	G/F
Sam "Barucci" Roth	Unknown

== American Basketball League standings ==
Pos.	Team	Wins	Losses	Win %
1	Wilkes-Barre Barons	29	12	.707
2	Scranton Miners	26	15	.634
3	Trenton Tigers	25	16	.610
T–4	Paterson Crescents	24	17	.585
T–4	Bridgeport Newfield Steelers	24	17	.585
6	Hartford Hurricanes / Caps	13	26	.333
7	Brooklyn Gothams	10	30	.250
8	Atlantic City Tides / Philadelphia SPHAs^{[a]}	8	26	.235

The Paterson Crescents would defeat the Bridgeport Newfield Steelers 99–80 in the fourth place tiebreaker match for the season, which would ensure their qualification for the 1949 ABL Playoffs for this season.

== American Basketball League playoffs ==
=== American Basketball League semifinals ===
(3) Trenton Tigers Vs. (1) Wilkes-Barre Barons: Wilkes-Barre wins series 2–0

- Game 1: March 30, 1949 @ Wilkes-Barre: Wilkes-Barre 106, Trenton 71
- Game 2: April 3, 1949 @ Trenton: Wilkes-Barre 93, Trenton 80

== Notes ==
^{a} Before this season began, the Philadelphia Sphas moved from Philadelphia, Pennsylvania to Atlantic City, New Jersey to become the Atlantic City Tides in an effort to survive for the long-term. However, after having disappointing attendance results for home games at the Million Dollar Pier in Atlantic City, the team returned to Philadelphia to become the Sphas once again for the rest of the season going forward into their existence on January 16, 1949, with them playing their final home games as a professional basketball team back at their primary home court in the ballroom area of the Broadwood Hotel.
