= 1948–49 Hartford Hurricanes / Caps season =

- League: American Basketball League (revived original)
- Head coach: John O'Brien (10–18); Ralph Kaplowitz (1–1); Wee Dinnie (2–7)
- General manager: John O'Brien(?); Ralph Kaplowitz(?); Wee Dinnie(?)
- Arena: Unknown (Colt Armory?)

Results
- Record: 13–26 (.333)
- Place: Conference: 6th
- Playoff finish: Did not qualify

The 1948–49 Hartford Hurricanes / Caps season was the third season of the franchise and the second season (and first full season) of the Hartford Hurricanes (who sometimes were referred to as the Hartford Caps instead for at least this season only) from Hartford, Connecticut in the revived (yet weakened up) form of the American Basketball League. Entering this season, Hartford would be one of eight teams competing in the league once again, though not the exact same eight teams from the previous season due to the Bridgeport Newfield Steelers replacing the EPBL's Lancaster (Red) Roses and the Philadelphia SPHAs initially moving to Atlantic City, New Jersey to become the Atlantic City Tides at first before returning to Philadelphia, Pennsylvania to become the SPHAs once again for the rest of the season not long afterward. Unfortunately for the Hurricanes (who were sometimes referred to as the Caps during this season), after starting the season out with an average 5–5 start, Hartford would end up performing rather poorly throughout the rest of the season soon afterward. The poor performances following their average start would also lead to the team going through multiple player-coaches throughout the season, as they would replace John O'Brien with Ralph Kaplowitz for two games before he was replaced with Wee Dinnie for the rest of the season. The poor performances throughout the season following their average start would result in Hartford getting a below-average 13–26 (with their performances in the rest of the season getting them a poor 8–21 finish) to get a sixth-place finish ahead of only the Atlantic City Tides turned Philadelphia SPHAs and Brooklyn Gothams (who would both end up leaving the ABL following the season's conclusion, with Brooklyn's team folding operations and the SPHAs later being purchased by the Harlem Globetrotters), which easily led to them failing to qualify for the ABL Playoffs this season.

== Roster ==
Due to information on American Basketball League players being generally hard to find (especially by the time the ABL was designated more as a minor league during its later years of existence), there are bound to be more gaps and/or inaccuracies found in certain areas on the team's roster spots than usual.

Player	Position(s)
Johnny Bach	G/F
Charlie Bollinger	Unknown
Frank Bores	Unknown
Joe Bores	Unknown
Paul Campbell	G
Verne Cox	Unknown
Lou Decsi	Unknown
Wee Dinnie	Unknown
Red Faber	F/C
George Feigenbaum	G
Bill Goebel	G
Woody Grimshaw	G
John Hazen	G
Bob Hubbard	C/F
Doc Hurley	F/C
Arnold Jones	C
Ralph Kaplowitz	G/F
Tom Kelly	G
Paul Klapprodt	Unknown
Bobby Knight	G/F
Ed Kosior	Unknown
Pat Mazzarella	PG
John O'Brien	G
Red Speicher	Unknown
Al Vogel	G
Ken Walters	G

== American Basketball League Standings ==
Pos.	Team	Wins	Losses	Win %
1	Wilkes-Barre Barons	29	12	.707
2	Scranton Miners	26	15	.634
3	Trenton Tigers	25	16	.610
T–4	Paterson Crescents	24	17	.585
T–4	Bridgeport Newfield Steelers	24	17	.585
6	Hartford Hurricanes / Caps	13	26	.333
7	Brooklyn Gothams	10	30	.250
8	Atlantic City Tides / Philadelphia SPHAs^{[a]}	8	26	.235

The Paterson Crescents would defeat the Bridgeport Newfield Steelers 99–80 on March 26, 1949, in the fourth place tiebreaker match for the season, which would ensure their qualification for the 1949 ABL Playoffs for this season.

== Notes ==
^{a} Before this season began, the Philadelphia Sphas moved from Philadelphia, Pennsylvania to Atlantic City, New Jersey to become the Atlantic City Tides in an effort to survive for the long-term. However, after having disappointing attendance results for home games at the Million Dollar Pier in Atlantic City, the team returned to Philadelphia to become the Sphas once again for the rest of the season going forward into their existence on January 16, 1949, with them playing their final home games as a professional basketball team back at their primary home court in the ballroom area of the Broadwood Hotel.
