= 1938–39 Philadelphia Sphas season =

American basketball team season

- League: American Basketball League (revived original)
- Head coach: Eddie Gottlieb
- General manager: Eddie Gottlieb
- Owner(s): Eddie Gottlieb
- Arena: Broadwood Hotel

Results
- Record: 24–9 (.727)
- Place: Conference: 2nd
- Playoff finish: Lost ABL Semifinals to New York Jewels, 2–0

The Philadelphia Sphas were an early, historical example of an American professional basketball team. The 1938–39 season was the sixth season played in the now-revived American Basketball League by the Sphas, although they did play in the original rendition of the ABL from 1926 to 1928 as the Philadelphia Warriors, which had no relation to the later BAA franchise of the same name that now exists in the present day as the Golden State Warriors in the NBA. As such, when including the past history of the original ABL with the revived version of the ABL in 1933 following historical problems that related to the Great Depression near the end of 1931, this would technically be the twelfth official season played by the original ABL properly, though this would officially be the 22nd season of play for the Sphas franchise when including previous seasons where they played under names like the "Philadelphia YMHA"; the "Philadelphia Passon, Gottlieb, Black", the "Philadelphia Warriors"; and the "Philadelphia Hebrews".

== Background ==
The Sphas played in leagues around Philadelphia since 1917, but game-by-game records before the Sphas rejoined the ABL in 1933 are not (currently) available (at least, not to the general public if official game records did exist for the Sphas) and are therefore likely lost to time itself. This would also become the American Basketball League's first season in its revived format (and its first overall season since its 1927–28 season) where the ABL itself would have one whole season properly instead of two half seasons of play, as well as a proper playoff format of sorts instead of utilizing a championship format of the two best teams of each half-season competing against each other to see who would win the overall league championship for the season (though the ABL didn't think it had enough teams on its end to utilize divisions like that 1927–28 season in the first place).

When trying to reclaim their place as champions of the ABL for the fourth time in six seasons, the Sphas would end up becoming one of the better teams in the league this season with an above-average 24–9 record. However, despite their very positive record, they wouldn't be seen as the best team of the ABL this season since the only team that had a better record than them this season would be the (original) Kingston Colonials franchise with an even better 28–7 record on their ends. Despite not having the best record in the ABL this season, the Sphas would qualify for the revived inaugural ABL Playoffs, with the #1 seeded Kingston Colonials going up against the #3 seeded defending ABL champion Jersey Reds and the #2 seeded Philadelphia Sphas going up against the #4 seeded New York Jewels. With that said, despite them appearing to be the better team earlier on in the season, injury issues both by the end of the regular season and during this playoff series led to the Sphas being swept by the Jewels 2–0 in the ABL Semifinals, with the Jewels later being crowned the new ABL champions after they defeated the defending champion Jersey Reds 2–1 (which occurred after the Reds had their own surprise upset over the better team in the Kingston Colonials with their own 2–1 series victory in the ABL Semifinals earlier on), which led to the Sphas once again failing to be crowned the ABL's champions in the newly-formatted league.

This season also originally had the Sphas try and compete in the inaugural 1939 World Professional Basketball Tournament alongside the Troy Celtics (who participated under that name after previously going by the Troy Haymakers during the ABL's season (likely to take tribute to the Original Celtics franchise that previously participated in the ABL at various points in its history)) as the ABL's representatives (alongside the New York Yankees basketball team as a former ABL representative team) for the new World Professional Basketball Tournament, which was an event held by the Chicago Herald American to designate who the best professional basketball team in the nation was at the time. However, the Sphas ended up being too injured by the end of the season to compete in what would become the inaugural event for what would later be designated as a yearly tournament throughout the next decade, which led to their spot being taken over and replaced by the Illinois Grads, a team made up of college graduate students from what would be from the nearby Champaign, Illinois area close to the host site in Chicago in a tournament structure that was awkwardly formatted due to there only being eleven teams competing in this inaugural tournament setting. The Grads team that took over for the Sphas would soon afterward be eliminated by the (newly added) Sheboygan Red Skins franchise from the rivaling (and (somewhat) growing) National Basketball League, with Sheboygan then defeating the Troy Celtics in the quarterfinal round before finishing in fourth place (which later became their best overall placement in the event's history) behind the world-famous (all-black) Harlem Globetrotters after losing to their own NBL rivals in the in-state Oshkosh All-Stars (who weirdly had a bye in the quarterfinal round) during the semifinal round, with Oshkosh losing the inaugural WPBT championship match to the all-black New York Renaissance (who had also previously beaten the Yankees in their quarterfinal match and then the Globetrotters in their semifinal match).

== Roster ==
Due to information on American Basketball League players being generally hard to find, there are bound to be more gaps and/or inaccuracies found in certain areas on the team's roster spots than usual.

1938–39 Philadelphia Sphas roster
Players

Pos.	No.	Player	Height	Weight	DOB	From
F/C		Mike Bloom	6 ft 6 in (1.98 m)	190 lb (86 kg)	1915–01–14	Temple
G/F		Gil Fitch	6 ft 0 in (1.83 m)	175 lb (79 kg)	1909–12–24	Temple
F/C		Moe Goldman	6 ft 3 in (1.91 m)	175 lb (79 kg)	1913–05–30	CCNY
G/F		Shikey Gotthoffer	6 ft 0 in (1.83 m)	195 lb (88 kg)	1911–01–01	NYU
G		Cy Kaselman	5 ft 10 in (1.78 m)	165 lb (75 kg)	1909–05–01	Temple
F/C		Inky Lautman	6 ft 2 in (1.88 m)	205 lb (93 kg)	1914–05–22	Central HS (PA)
G		Sol Miehoff	5 ft 8 in (1.73 m)	160 lb (73 kg)	1916–09–08	Penn State
F/C		Beano Resnick	6 ft 2 in (1.88 m)	195 lb (88 kg)	1916–08–17	Pierce Business College
F/C		Red Rosan	6 ft 2 in (1.88 m)	195 lb (88 kg)	1911–05–22	Temple
G		Petey Rosenberg	5 ft 10 in (1.78 m)	165 lb (75 kg)	1918–04–07	Saint Joseph's
G		Red Wolfe	5 ft 11 in (1.80 m)	165 lb (75 kg)	1905–07–18	St. John's

Coaches
Head coach
- Eddie Gottlieb

Legend
- (DP) Unsigned draft pick
- (FA) Free agent
- (S) Suspended
- Injured

Note: Both Sol Miehoff and Beano Resnick would not play for the team during the 1939 ABL Playoffs.

== ABL Standings ==
Pos.	League Standings	Wins	Losses	Win %
1	Kingston Colonials	28	7	.800
2	Philadelphia SPHAs	24	9	.727
3	Jersey Reds	19	14	.576
4	New York Jewels	19	15	.559
5	Wilkes-Barre Barons	14	22	.389
6	Troy Haymakers	12	21	.364
7	Brooklyn Visitations	7	20	.259
8	Washington Heurichs	7	22	.241

The top four teams would later compete in a playoff format this season, with the best team competing against the third-best team and the second-best team competing against the fourth-best team through a best-of-three series in the semifinal round before the winning two teams from each round would go up against each other in a best-of-three championship series.

== ABL Schedule ==
This season would mark the first season in the revived version of the ABL's history (and the first overall season since the 1927–28 ABL season) to have a regular, full regular season instead of two half seasons merged together into one whole season of play. This meant that the ABL would utilize a proper playoff formatting for their postseason play this season instead of having the two best teams competing in the championship round (assuming one team didn't win both halves for the overall season there).

=== ABL Regular Season ===
#	Date	Opponent	Score	Record
1	November 5	Brooklyn Visitations	53–35	1–0
2	November 11	@ Wilkes-Barre Barons	31–20	2–0
3	November 12	Kingston Colonials	33–24	3–0
4	November 13	@ New York Jewels	35–36	3–1
5	November 19	New York Jewels	35–28	4–1
6	November 26	Washington Heurichs	56–41	5–1
7	November 27	@ Jersey Reds	36–39	5–2
8	December 3	Wilkes-Barre Barons	45–26	6–2
9	December 4	@ Brooklyn Visitations	23–39	6–3
10	December 9	@ Washington Heurichs	43–34	7–3
11	December 10	Jersey Reds	44–34	8–3
12	December 14	@ Troy Haymakers	43–33	9–3
13	December 15	@ Kingston Colonials	20–43	9–4
14	December 17	Troy Haymakers	44–41	10–4
15	December 24	Brooklyn Visitations	50–38	11–4
16	January 7	Brooklyn Jewels	34–32	12–4
17	January 8	@ Washington Heurichs	48–36	13–4
18	January 14	New York Jewels	40–37	14–4
19	January 15	@ New York Jewels	40–39	15–4
20	January 21	Wilkes-Barre Barons	43–39	16–4
21	January 22	@ Jersey Reds	43–36	17–4
22	January 28	Washington Heurichs	62–42	18–4
23	January 31	@ Kingston Colonials	25–40	18–5
24	February 2	@ Troy Haymakers	32–43	18–6
25	February 4	Jersey Reds	40–36	19–6
26	February 11	Troy Haymakers	67–41	20–6
27	February 17	@ Wilkes-Barre Barons	49–41	21–6
28	February 18	New York Jewels	38–40	21–7
29	February 25	Brooklyn Visitations	61–43	22–7
30	February 26	@ Jersey Reds	33–42	22–8
31	March 2	@ Brooklyn Visitations	49–30	23–8
32	March 4	Jersey Reds	41–35	24–8
33	March 5	@ New York Jewels	32–33	24–9

=== ABL Playoffs ===
For the first time since the 1927–28 season (or ever in terms of its revived history), the American Basketball League would host a proper playoff series for their league by the end of the regular season instead of a championship series between the two best teams on each half-season of play (with potential tiebreaker series of match-ups going down after each half-season is over and done with).

==== ABL Semifinals ====
Game	Date	Opponent	Score	Record
Game 1	March 18	New York Jewels	44–46	0–1
Game 2	March 19	@ New York Jewels	24–31	0–2
