= 1935–36 Paterson Panthers / Trenton Bengals / Passaic Red Devils season =

- League: American Basketball League (revived original)
- Head coach: Bennie Borgmann (Paterson & Trenton; 4–11); Freddie Romp (Passaic; 8–11)
- General manager: Frank Smith(?)
- Arena: Paterson Armory (Paterson); Trenton Arena (Trenton); Passaic Armory (Passaic)

Results
- Record: 12–22 (.353)
- Place: Conference: 6th (both halves)
- Playoff finish: Did not qualify

The 1935–36 Paterson Panthers / Trenton Bengals / Passaic Red Devils season was presumably the 28th professional basketball season played by the Trenton Bengals (and their seventh and final professional season under the (Royal) Bengals name properly after previously using the Nationals, Trentons, Potters, Tigers, and (presumably) Moose team names alongside the merged season in the failed "original" National Basketball League as the Greenpoint Knights of St. Anthony/Trenton Royal Bengals and the combined season of play when operating as both the Paterson Panthers earlier in the 1935–36 season and the Passaic Red Devils later in the 1935–36 season) of the revived original version of the American Basketball League. Interestingly, unlike the other (professional) seasons that Trenton would play in, this one would not start out in Trenton, nor would it officially conclude in Trenton either. Originally, the team that entered the ABL as one of the six teams competing in the league this season first started out in Paterson, New Jersey instead of in nearby Trenton as the Paterson Panthers, but after going winless in their first five games played in the season, the team moved out to nearby Trenton, New Jersey for the rest of the first half of the season to become the Trenton Bengals properly. While competing as the Trenton Bengals, they would perform a fair bit better by comparison to how they started out the season as the Paterson Panthers, but they still ended up finishing the first half of the season rather poorly with a 4–11 record, becoming dead last in the league there and soon afterward moving out to nearby Passaic, New Jersey to become the Passaic Red Devils for the rest of the season once the ABL entered its second half of the season. Once that change happened, even though the Red Devils would perform a fair bit better as a franchise, they would still end up being a below-average team that would finish in last place in the ABL with an 8–11 record for that half of the season, though they'd be surprisingly close to the rest of the competition along the way there (with them being a game behind the Philadelphia SPHAs / Hebrews for fifth place and two games behind the Kingston Colonials for fourth place, as well as a few games behind the first place Brooklyn Visitations). Following this season's conclusion, the Passaic Red Devils would withdraw their operations from the ABL, although Trenton would later return in 1941 as the Trenton Tigers, while Paterson technically later returned in 1945 as the revived version of the Paterson Crescents, with both cities having teams operate in the ABL up until the early 1950s.

== Rosters ==
Due to information on American Basketball League players being generally hard to find, there are bound to be more gaps and/or inaccuracies found in certain areas on the team's roster spots than usual.

=== Paterson Panthers Roster ===
Player	Position(s)
John "Pete" Barry	G
Dave Bass	F/C
Bennie Borgman	G/F
Gaza Chizmadia	F/C
Red Grower	G
Al Kellett	C
Phil Rabin	G/F
Rusty Saunders	F
Milt Trupin	G/F
Sam Winograd	G

This team would go winless before moving during this season.

=== Trenton Bengals Roster ===
Player	Position(s)
Dave Bass	F/C
Bennie Borgman	G/F
Gaza Chizmadia	F/C
George Glasco	G
Al Kellett	C
Phil Rabin	G/F
Rusty Saunders	F
Milt Trupin	G/F

Interestingly, every single player on this team would either end up previously playing for the Paterson Panthers and/or later end up playing for the Passaic Red Devils.

=== Passaic Red Devils Roster ===
Player	Position(s)
Dave Bass	F/C
Bud Clancy	G/F
George Glasco	G
Sonny Gluck	G/F
Al Kellett	C
Mooney Levine	G/F
Bill McElwain	G
Willie Putzer	F
Phil Rabin	G/F
Rusty Saunders	F
Benny Selzer	G/F
Taxi Tackach	G/F

When it came to players that were a part of all three teams this season, only Dave Bass, Al Kellett, Phil Rabin, and Rusty Saunders were a part of all three of the Paterson Panthers, Trenton Bengals, and Passaic Red Devils during this period of time, with four other players playing for two of the three teams in question as well, with all of them notably playing for the Trenton Bengals (for this situation, Bennie Borgman, Gaza Chizmadia, and Milt Trupin played for both Paterson and Trenton, while only George Glasco playing for both Trenton and Passaic).

== American Basketball League Standings ==
First Half
Team	Wins	Losses	Winning %
Philadelphia SPHAs / Hebrews	14	5	.737
New York Jewels	11	8	.579
Brooklyn Visitations	10	10	.500
Jersey Reds	9	9	.500
Kingston Colonials	7	12	.368
Paterson Panthers / Trenton Bengals^{[a]}	4	11	.267

Second Half
Team	Wins	Losses	Winning %
Brooklyn Visitations	12	8	.600
Jersey Reds	11	9	.550
New York Jewels	10	10	.500
Kingston Colonials	9	10	.474
Philadelphia SPHAs / Hebrews	9	11	.450
Passaic Red Devils^{[a]}	8	11	.421

== Notes ==
^{a} During the first half of the season, after losing all five of the games they played this season, the Paterson Panthers would move from Paterson, New Jersey to nearby Trenton, New Jersey on December 12, 1935, to become the newer version of the Trenton Bengals for the rest of the season. Trenton would finish the first half of the season with a 4–6 record for an overall record of 4–11 between the two teams before the Trenton squad moved out to nearby Passaic, New Jersey on December 30, 1935, to play as the Passaic Red Devils by the time the second half of the season began.
