= 1947–48 Elizabeth Braves / Hartford Hurricanes season =

American basketball team season

- League: American Basketball League (revived original)
- Head coach: Leo Merson (1–0); John O'Brien (10–12)
- General manager: Leo Merson(?); John O'Brien(?)
- Arena: Elizabeth Armory? (Elizabeth); Colt Armory? (Hartford)

Results
- Record: 11–12 (.478)
- Place: Conference: 5th
- Playoff finish: Did not qualify

The 1947–48 Elizabeth Braves / Hartford Hurricanes season was the second (and technically final) season of the Elizabeth Braves franchise from Elizabeth, New Jersey and the first season of the team playing with their much more well known Hartford Hurricanes name in Hartford, Connecticut in the revived (yet weakened up) form of the American Basketball League. Originally, the Elizabeth Braves looked like they would stay in Elizabeth, New Jersey after their first game played in the season, but by December 19, 1947, the team would officially move to Hartford, Connecticut to become the more well-known Hartford Hurricanes for the rest of the season. In any case, the Braves turned Hurricanes would originally be one of eight teams competing in the ABL this season before the quick departure of the Lancaster (Red) Roses saw the league drop down to seven competitive teams for the rest of the season. Similar to their inaugural season of play, the Braves turned Hurricanes would end up getting a losing record to conclude the season, with this season providing the team with an 11–12 record for a fifth-place finish ahead of the withdrawn Lancaster (Red) Roses, Brooklyn Gothams, and Philadelphia SPHAs, but behind the Jersey City Atoms turned Scranton Miners, the defending ABL champion Trenton Tigers, the Paterson Crescents, and the inaugural EPBL champion Wilkes-Barre Barons. However, because this team finished with a below-average record for the season, the Elizabeth Braves turned Hartford Hurricanes would be eliminated from playoff contention by the end of the season.

== Rosters ==
Due to information on American Basketball League players being generally hard to find (especially by the time the ABL was designated more as a minor league during its later years of existence), there are bound to be more gaps and/or inaccuracies found in certain areas on the team's roster spots than usual.

=== Elizabeth Braves Roster ===
Player	Position(s)
Sid Blair	F
Norm Drucker	Unknown
Steve Juenger	G/F
Lenny Lesser	Unknown
Bob Mullens	G
Dick Murphy	G
"Red" Patrick Walsh	Unknown

Note: In addition to those players, they would also briefly have a player with the last name of Seekant (potentially being Arthur Seekamp) that was on the Elizabeth Braves roster only as well.

=== Hartford Hurricanes Roster ===
Player	Position(s)
Red Allen	G
Frank Bores	Unknown
Verne Cox	Unknown
Jack Curran	G/F
Red Dehnert	F
Bob Fitzgerald	F/C
Tom Flanagan	G/F
Coulby Gunther	F
James Hanrahan	G
Arnold Jones	C
Paul Klapprodt	Unknown
Bobby Knight	G/F
John O'Brien	G
Bob Sherman	Unknown
Bill Wade	Unknown

== American Basketball League Standings ==
Due to the decreased number of teams this season, the ABL would remove divisions from their league this season going forward after previously using them for their previous season of play.

Pos.	Team	Wins	Losses	Win %
1	Wilkes-Barre Barons	26	8	.765
2	Paterson Crescents	19	16	.543
3	Trenton Tigers	17	15	.531
4	Jersey City Atoms / Scranton Miners^{[a]}	16	16	.500
5	Elizabeth Braves / Hartford Hurricanes^{[b]}	11	12	.478
6	Philadelphia SPHAs	13	19	.406
7	Brooklyn Gothams	8	20	.286
8	Lancaster (Red) Roses^{[c]}	1	5	.167

== Notes ==
^{a} Originally, the Jersey City Atoms would move from Jersey City, New Jersey to nearby Union City, New Jersey on January 16, 1948 (though it doesn't appear that the Jersey City Atoms rebranded their team by this point in time) before moving again to Scranton, Pennsylvania to become the Scranton Miners twelve days later on January 28, 1948, for the rest of the season going forward.
^{b} The Elizabeth Braves would move from Elizabeth, New Jersey to Hartford, Connecticut on December 19, 1947, to become the Hartford Hurricanes for the rest of the season.
^{c} The Lancaster Roses (sometimes referred to as the Lancaster Red Roses instead) would end up withdrawing their operations from the ABL early in the season on December 4, 1947, to return to the Eastern Professional Basketball League not long afterward.
