= John O'Brien (basketball, born 1916) =

American basketball player (1916–1994)

Personal information
- Born: 1916
- Died: June 16, 1994 (aged 77) Windsor, Connecticut, U.S.
- Listed height: 6 ft 1 in (1.85 m)
- Listed weight: 210 lb (95 kg)

Career information
- High school: Windsor (Windsor, Connecticut)
- College: Columbia (1935–1938)
- Position: Guard

Career history

Playing
- 1940–1941: New York Gothams
- 1941: Akron Goodyear Wingfoots
- 1942–194?: Brooklyn Visitations
- 194?–194?: Hartford Hurricanes

Coaching
- 194?–194?: Hartford Hurricanes

Career highlights
- 2× First-team All-American – Helms (1937, 1938)

John Jeremiah O'Brien Jr. (1916 – June 16, 1994) was an American professional basketball player. He played in the National Basketball League for the Akron Goodyear Wingfoots during the 1941–42 season. In 1952, he became a referee for the National Basketball Association.
