= Tony Kelly (basketball) =

American basketball player

Personal information
- Born: February 18, 1919 Chicago, Illinois, U.S.
- Died: March 1, 1987 (aged 68) Oak Lawn, Illinois, U.S.
- Listed height: 6 ft 1 in (1.85 m)
- Listed weight: 165 lb (75 kg)

Career information
- High school: Mount Carmel (Chicago, Illinois)
- College: Marquette (1939–1940); DePaul (1941–1943)
- Playing career: 1943–1949
- Position: Guard

Career history
- 1943–1946: Sheboygan Red Skins
- 1946–1947: Baltimore Bullets
- 1947–1948: Saratoga Indians
- 1947–1948: Chattanooga Majors
- 1948–1949: Mohawk Redskins

Anthony M. Kelly (February 18, 1919 – March 1, 1987) was an American professional basketball player. He played for the Sheboygan Red Skins in the National Basketball League for three seasons and averaged 3.9 points per game.
