= Schenectady Packers =

New York-based basketball team

The Schenectady Packers were an American basketball team based in Schenectady, New York that was a member of the New York State Professional Basketball League and the American Basketball League.

The team was originally known as the Schenectady Comets and played in the New York State League from 1946. Home games were played at the Schenectady Armory. After losing money their first year, they were acquired by Hank Bozzi and Si Etkin.

Once they were renamed to the Schnectady Packers during what would be their final season in the NYSPBL, they played in the American Basketball League. Their most memorable game under the Packers was against the Harlem Globetrotters, which including Goose Tatum and Marques Haynes.

The team folded early on during the 1949–1950 ABL season without winning a single game there.

== Year-by-year ==
| Year | League | Reg. season | Playoffs |
|---|---|---|---|
| 1948/49 | NYSPL | 4th | Semifinals |
| 1949/50 | ABL | 8th | Did not qualify |
