= 1927–28 Philadelphia Sphas season =

American basketball team season

1927–28 Philadelphia Warriors season
- League: American Basketball League (original)
- Head coach: Eddie Gottlieb & Harry Passon
- General manager: Eddie Gottlieb
- Owner(s): Jules Aronson; Max Hoff; Eddie Gottlieb; Harry Passon; Edwin "Hughie" Black
- Arena: Philadelphia Arena (original)

Results
- Record: 30–21 (.588)
- Place: Division: 2nd (Eastern)
- Playoff finish: Lost Eastern Division Playoff to the New York (Original) Celtics, 2–0

The 1927–28 season was the second and final season played by the Philadelphia Sphas while operating as the original Philadelphia Warriors in what what would be later known as the original American Basketball League, the first ever attempt at a genuinely regional, major professional league (though it would be their eleventh overall season of play when including seasons played as the Philadelphia YMCA and the Philadelphia Passon, Gottlieb, Black franchises (and unofficially, the Philadelphia Quakers / Phillies franchise during the previous season of play)). This season saw the Philadelphia Sphas return to the original ABL under the original Philadelphia Warriors franchise name that they originally played in during the second half of the previous ABL season of play. When competing in the original ABL for the second (and arguably final) time, the Philadelphia Warriors sought to compete for their first championship in the ABL after failing to qualify for the championship round in the previous season, though this season would see the ABL operate in a different format when compared to the previous two seasons the ABL operated in with divisional play. As such, this would mark the first time this Philadelphia franchise would compete in a season that didn't represent halves in an overall season, with the Sphas / Warriors competing in 51 games played in the regular season for their first ever 30 win season. With that being said, despite the original American Basketball League being more well-known as a professional basketball league than the rest of the basketball leagues that the Philadelphia Sphas franchise played in over the past decade, game-by-game records are (currently) not available for this season, though the games played this season (alongside the previous season) could be more likely to eventually be found for the general public to see this season when compared to most of the other basketball leagues they played in their past history. Throughout the entire season, the Warriors would trail in their division behind the New York (Original) Celtics, with the Original Celtics winning the Eastern Division through a 40–9 record and the Philadelphia Warriors getting a second place finish in their division with an above-average 30–21 record. Despite trailing against the Celtics, the Warriors would compete against the defending champion Celtics in the newly-implemented divisional playoffs, with Philadelphia ultimately being swept by the eventual champion Celtics 2–0 in the Eastern Division Playoff.

Following the season's end, Philadelphia would leave the ABL to participate in the briefly revived Philadelphia Basket Ball League under their original SPHAs name. Part of the reason why Philadelphia would leave the ABL in the first place was because the team, while playing under the Warriors name for both this season and the previous season, would end up losing $60,000 in the two seasons they played within the ABL in its original tenure of existence while competing against the likes of the Original Celtics there. Due to the high-profile status of the original American Basketball League name, this season would see a lot more coverage than most of the previous seasons the Philadelphia franchise had to deal with during their early history. Not only that, but this would be the last time the Sphas franchise would play under a different name up until their final season of play as a regular franchise, with the team only returning to the ABL while it was under a more minuscule manner under the Sphas name by the time the ABL revived itself following the long-term effects of the Great Depression.

== Roster ==
Due to information on American Basketball League players being generally hard to find, there are bound to be more gaps and/or inaccuracies found in certain areas on the team's roster spots than usual.

1927–28 Philadelphia Warriors roster
Players

Pos.	No.	Player	Height	Weight	DOB	From
G/F		Babe Artus	6 ft 0 in (1.83 m)	200 lb (91 kg)	1898-03-20	No college
G/F		Thomas Barlow	6 ft 1 in (1.85 m)	195 lb (88 kg)	1896-07-09	Drexel
G/F		Soup Campbell	5 ft 9 in (1.75 m)	160 lb (73 kg)	1897-12-24	No college
F/C		Gaza Chizmadia	6 ft 2 in (1.88 m)	185 lb (84 kg)	1906-01-12	No college
G		George Glasco	5 ft 10 in (1.78 m)	150 lb (68 kg)	1901-04-07	No college
G		Sonny Gluck	5 ft 10 in (1.78 m)	180 lb (82 kg)	1902-04-30	No college
G		Teddy Kearns	5 ft 11 in (1.80 m)	180 lb (82 kg)	1900-01-01	Perkiomen Prep School (NJ)
F/C		Al Kellett	6 ft 3 in (1.91 m)	200 lb (91 kg)	1901-10-30	Columbia
F/C		Babe Klotz	6 ft 2 in (1.88 m)	190 lb (86 kg)	1900-10-23	Girard College
G		Moyer Krakovitch	5 ft 10 in (1.78 m)		1907-11-14	Union HS (NJ)
G/F		Mickey Maister	5 ft 11 in (1.80 m)	175 lb (79 kg)	1904-06-28	William & Mary
F/C		Stretch Miller	6 ft 3 in (1.91 m)	200 lb (91 kg)	1901-03-07	Illinois State Normal
G/F		Sam Moorehead	6 ft 1 in (1.85 m)	185 lb (84 kg)	1892-10-04	No college
F/C		Reds Sherr	6 ft 2 in (1.88 m)	210 lb (95 kg)	1905-02-02	Penn
G		Freddie Wesslock	5 ft 10 in (1.78 m)	175 lb (79 kg)	1905-10-20	No college
G		Doc Whyte			Unknown	No college

Coaches
Head coach

Eddie Gottlieb
Harry Passon

Legend
- (DP) Unsigned draft pick
- (FA) Free agent
- (S) Suspended
- Injured

Roster

In addition to Doc Whyte's birth date (never mind birth year) being unknown (and likely lost to time), another unknown player that was a forward who had the last name of Prescott was also on the team's regular season roster during this season as well. The playoff roster for this season, however, involved only Babe Artus, Thomas Barlow, Gaza Chizmadia, George Glasco, Teddy Kearns, Al Kellett, and Reds Sherr as their official competitive roster for a shot at the ABL championship this season.

== American Basketball League Standings ==
=== Eastern Division ===
Eastern Division
Team	Wins	Losses	Winning %
New York (Original) Celtics	40	9	.816
Philadelphia Warriors	30	21	.588
Washington Palace Five (/ Laundrymen) / Brooklyn Visitations*	25	26	.490
Rochester Centrals	24	28	.462

* – The Washington Palace Five / Laundrymen franchise would have their franchise rights and record be transferred out to the Brooklyn Visitations by January 3, 1928 for the unofficial second half of the season.

=== Western Division ===
Western Division
Team	Wins	Losses	Winning %
Fort Wayne Hoosiers	27	24	.529
Cleveland Rosenblums	22	29	.431
Chicago Bruins	13	36	.265
Detroit Cardinals / Olympians†	5	13	.278

† – Withdrew from the ABL on January 3, 1928 by the start of the unofficial second half of the season.

== ABL Playoffs ==
=== ABL Eastern Division Playoff ===
(2E) Philadelphia Warriors Vs. (1E) New York (Original) Celtics: New York (Original) Celtics win series 2–0

- Game 1: March 13, 1928 @ New York: Philadelphia Warriors 21, New York (Original) Celtics 27
- Game 2: March 14, 1928 @ Philadelphia: New York (Original) Celtics 32, Philadelphia Warriors 24

(The New York (Original) Celtics would later repeat as champions of the ABL (though playing their first season under the New York (Original) Celtics name instead of the Brooklyn Celtics name during their first season in the ABL) by defeating the Fort Wayne Hoosiers in the championship series. Likewise, this would be the final season where the Sphas would play as the Warriors, as they would leave the ABL after this season's conclusion and wouldn't return to it until it got revived under a mostly different vision years later in 1933.)
