= New York State Professional Basketball League =

The New York State Professional Basketball League (NYSPL) was a professional basketball circuit based in New York. The league was founded in 1946 and dissolved after three seasons in 1949.

== History ==
The league formed in 1946 as an eight-team circuit. The first game was on November 20, 1946 in Albany, New York at the Washington Avenue Armory between the Albany Senators and the Cohoes Mastodons. Albany lost their first two games, which led them to replace their head coach George Duke for Barney Sedran.

On December 28, 1947, league commissioner Frank Basloe announced an Oswego–Cohoes game was fortified by the latter team. Cohoes players were stranded in New York City during a snow storm and were unable to make the game on time. The league wrapped its first half season on January 2, 1948. The Mohawk Royals set a league-high for points scored during a game on January 8, 1948 with 112 in victory over the Oswego Pontiacs. On January 21, 1948 the league assembled a New York State Professional Basketball League All-Star team to play the Utica Olympics. Jerry Rizzo joined the NYSPL Saratoga Indians following a suspension from the National Basketball League for a physical altercation with a referee.

Before the 1948–49 season the Utica Olympics announced their local fire department would not permit the team to play at the Utica Armory. The fire department eventually accepted plans by the team to admit a limited number of spectators to the venue. The 1949 championship series between the Mohawk Redskins and the Cohoes Mastodons was never completed. Players for both teams failed to report to the first championship game and several players for Mohawk and their coach Bernard Sarachek had signed with American Basketball League teams. League officials vowed to return for the 1949–1950 season, but it eventually disbanded due to high operating costs. The 1948–49 championship was awarded to the Cohoes Mastadons, who had the best regular season record.

=== List of teams ===
- Albany Senators (1946–47) → Albany Red Devils (1946–1948)
- Albany–Troy Celtics (1947) → Glen Falls Commodores (1947–1949)
- Cohoes Mastodons (1946–1949)
- Gloversville (1946–47)
- Harlem Yahkees (1948–49)
- Mohawk Redskins (1946–1949)
- Oswego Pontiacs (1947–48)
- Saratoga Indians (1946–1949)
- Schenectady Comets (1946–1948)
- Schenectady Packers (1948–49)
- Troy Whirlwinds (1946–47)
- Utica Olympics (1946–1949)

== Season-by-season standings ==
=== 1946–47 ===
Regular season

Team	W	L	PCT	GB
Eastern Division
Cohoes Mastodons	25	8	.758	—
Albany Senators/Red Devils	20	13	.606	5
Saratoga Indians	19	15	.558	6.5
Troy Whirlwinds §	2	32	.143	—
Western Division
Utica Olympics	25	9	.735	—
Mohawk Redskins	24	10	.706	1
Schenectady Comets	17	17	.500	8
Gloversville §	0	34	.000	—

§ Disbanded during the season

Championship

- Utica Olympics defeated the Cohoes Mastodons—three games to none.

=== 1947–48 ===
Team	W	L	PCT	GB
Eastern Division
Cohoes Mastodons	29	7	.805	—
Saratoga Indians	26	10	.722	3
Albany-Troy Celtics/Glen Falls Commodores	22	14	.611	7
Oswego Pontiacs	2	34	.055	27
Western Division
Utica Olympics	18	18	.500	—
Mohawk Redskins	17	19	.472	1
Schenectady Comets	12	24	.333	6

Championship

- Mohawk defeated Utica—four games to none

=== 1948–49 ===
Regular season

Team	W	L	PCT	GB
Cohoes Mastodons	20	9	.690	—
Mohawk Redskins	18	9	.667	0.5
Glens Falls Commodores	19	10	.655	1
Schenectady Packers	15	12	.556	3
Harlem Yankees	12	14	.462	6.5
Saratoga Indians	6	25	.194	15
Utica Olympics §	6	14	.300	—
Troy Celtics §	1	3	.250	—

§ Disbanded during the season

Championship

- Cohoes and Mohawk are declared co-champions after splitting one game apiece during the championship series. Players started to sign with other professional teams and the championship was declared a draw.

== Notable coaches ==
- Tubby Raskin (1902–1981), basketball player and coach
