= Matt Guokas Sr. =

American basketball player (1915–1993)

Matthew Guokas Sr.
Personal information
- Born: November 11, 1915 Philadelphia, Pennsylvania, U.S.
- Died: December 9, 1993 (aged 78) Flourtown, Pennsylvania, U.S.
- Listed height: 6 ft 3 in (1.91 m)
- Listed weight: 195 lb (88 kg)

Career information
- High school: Saint Joseph's (Philadelphia, Pennsylvania)
- College: Saint Joseph's (1934–1938)
- Playing career: 1938–1947
- Position: Forward
- Number: 14

Career history
- 1938–1939: Wilkes-Barre Barons
- 1941–1945: Trenton Tigers
- 1946–1947: Philadelphia Warriors

Career highlights
- BAA champion (1947); Second-team All-American – MSG (1938)
- Stats at NBA.com
- Stats at Basketball Reference

Matthew George Guokas Sr. (/ˈɡuːkəs/ GOO-kəs; November 11, 1915 – December 9, 1993) was an American professional basketball player and broadcaster.

== Biography ==
He was the son of Lithuanian immigrants.

A 6 ft 3 in (1.91 m) forward from Saint Joseph's University, Guokas played one season with the Philadelphia Warriors of the BAA (a precursor to the NBA). He averaged 1.7 points during the Warriors' 1946–47 championship season.

After losing his right leg in an automobile accident, Guokas turned to broadcasting, and he served as an announcer for the National Football League's Philadelphia Eagles from 1953 to 1985. He was also the public address announcer for Philadelphia Phillies baseball games at Connie Mack Stadium in 1965 to 1966, succeeding the late Pete Byron, and replaced by Eddie Ferenz.

== Personal life ==
His son Matt Guokas Jr. played in the NBA from 1966 to 1976, and later coached the Philadelphia 76ers and Orlando Magic and worked as a broadcaster for the NBA on NBC and other sports networks.

Guokas and his son, Matt Jr., were the first father-son duo to both win NBA championships as players; this feat has since been repeated by the Barrys (Rick and Brent), the Waltons (Bill and Luke), the Thompsons (Mychal and Klay), and the Paytons (Gary and Gary II).

== BAA career statistics ==
Legend
GP	Games played	GS	Games started	MPG	Minutes per game
FG%	Field goal percentage	3P%	3-point field goal percentage	FT%	Free throw percentage
RPG	Rebounds per game	APG	Assists per game	SPG	Steals per game
BPG	Blocks per game	PPG	Points per game	**Bold**	Career high
†	Won an NBA championship

=== Regular season ===
Year	Team	GP	FG%	FT%	APG	PPG
1946–47†	Philadelphia	47	.269	.553	.2	1.7
Career		47	.269	.553	.2	1.7

=== Playoffs ===
Year	Team	GP	FG%	FT%	APG	PPG
1946–47†	Philadelphia	8	.111	.400	.0	.5
Career		8	.111	.400	.0	.5
