= 1947 World Professional Basketball Tournament =

World Professional Basketball Tournament
- 1947

Tournament information
- Location: Chicago, Illinois
- Dates: 7 April–11 April
- Venue: Chicago Stadium
- Teams: 14

Final positions
- Champions: Indianapolis Kautskys
- 1st runner-up: Toledo Jeeps
- 2nd runner-up: Fort Wayne Zollner Pistons
- MVP: Julie Rivlin

The 1947 World Professional Basketball Tournament was the ninth edition of the World Professional Basketball Tournament. It was held in Chicago, Illinois, during the days of 7–11 April 1947 and featured 14 teams, with the teams competing there primarily being a mixture of teams from the ever-strong National Basketball League and independently ran teams, with there also being the inclusion of the Baltimore Bullets from the American Basketball League (at the time) and the Portland Indians of the short-lived Pacific Coast Professional Basketball League. Due to a combination of the Chicago American Gears & Rochester Royals declining their invitation to the 1947 event in order to play out the 1947 NBL Championship series they had (before the American Gears later left the NBL to try their hands with a new league of their own in the Professional Basketball League of America (which turned out to be a short-lived league of its own accord)) and the Chicago Stags playing in the 1947 BAA Finals for the inaugural season of the newly created (yet at the time struggling) Basketball Association of America (now National Basketball Association) to rival the long-standing NBL, local interest in the tournament turned out to wane when compared to prior years (albeit not by a significant amount for the tournament's organizers). However, the event would be notable for seeing the Fort Wayne Zollner Pistons failing to win their fourth straight WPBT championship due to them being upset 61–56 by the Toledo Jeeps. Despite the upset that Toledo caused in the semifinal match-up, the championship match would ultimately be won by the Indianapolis Kautskys (who had previously not won a single WPBT match before this year, even in the years where they participated as the Pure Oils and Oilers names during World War II), who defeated the Toledo Jeeps 62–47 in the title game. The Fort Wayne Zollner Pistons came in third after beating the Oshkosh All-Stars 86–67 in the third-place game behind Ralph Hamilton's 26 points. Despite his team not winning this year's event, Julie Rivlin of the Toledo Jeeps was named the tournament's Most Valuable Player.

== Results ==
=== Bracket ===
Round 1
Tri-Cities Blackhawks	57
Baltimore Bullets	46
Oshkosh All-Stars	60
Herkimer Mohawk Redskins	54
Sheboygan Red Skins	62
Portland Indians	48
Anderson Duffey Packers	59
Pittsburgh Pirates	38
Midland Dow Chemicals	71
Syracuse Nationals	39
Toledo Jeeps	62
New York Renaissance	59

Quarterfinals
Indianapolis Kautskys	65
Tri-Cities Blackhawks	56
Oshkosh All-Stars	53
Sheboygan Red Skins	44
Fort Wayne Zollner Pistons	52
Anderson Duffey Packers	40
Midland Dow Chemicals	55
Toledo Jeeps	59

Semifinals
Indianapolis Kautskys	59
Oshkosh All-Stars	38
Fort Wayne Zollner Pistons	56
Toledo Jeeps	61

Final
Indianapolis Kautskys	62
Toledo Jeeps	47
Third place
Oshkosh All-Stars	67
Fort Wayne Zollner Pistons	86

=== Third place game ===
April 11, 1947

Box score

Fort Wayne Zollner Pistons 86, Oshkosh All-Stars 67
Scoring by quarter: 24–15, 22–18, 19–13, 21–21
Pts: R. Hamilton – 26	Pts: T. Scalissi – 16

Chicago Stadium
Referees: Bud Lowell, John Sines

=== Championship game ===
April 11, 1947

Box score

Indianapolis Kautskys 62, Toledo Jeeps 47
Scoring by quarter: 14–13, 16–16, 17–9, 15–9
Pts: L. Klier – 12	Pts: G. Sobek – 20

Chicago Stadium
Attendance: 14,413
Referees: Sam Pecararo, Dutch Kriznecky

== Individual awards ==
- Hal Tidrick of the Toledo Jeeps led this tournament in scoring with 57 points scored in four games played.

=== All-Tournament First Team ===
- C - Arnie Risen, Indianapolis Kautskys
- F - Leo Klier, Indianapolis Kautskys
- F - Ralph Hamilton, Fort Wayne Zollner Pistons
- G - Julie Rivlin, Toledo Jeeps (MVP)
- G - Herm Schaefer, Indianapolis Kautskys

=== All-Tournament Second Team ===
- C - Jake Pelkington, Fort Wayne Zollner Pistons
- F - Paul Cloyd, Midland Dow Chemicals
- F - Hal Tidrick , Toledo Jeeps
- G - Billy Hassett, Tri-Cities Blackhawks
- G - George Sobek, Toledo Jeeps

== See also ==
- 1946–47 National Basketball League (United States) season, a professional basketball season featuring eight out of twelve teams there (including the eventual WPBT champion Indianapolis Kautskys), which also showcased a championship event going on in Chicago at around the exact same time as this tournament
- 1946–47 Baltimore Bullets season, a professional basketball season involving the defending champions of the revived version of the original American Basketball League in the (original) Baltimore Bullets franchise; Baltimore would later be disqualified from the ABL's championship series and decide to enter the Basketball Association of America in relation to their entry into this tournament
- 1947 BAA playoffs, a rivaling competitive tournament going on from a new professional basketball league called the Basketball Association of America (later known as the National Basketball Association) that was also occurring within Chicago at around the exact same time as this tournament
