= Mike Bloom (basketball) =

American basketball player (1915–1993)

Personal information
- Born: January 14, 1915 New York City, New York, U.S.
- Died: June 5, 1993 (aged 78)
- Listed height: 6 ft 6 in (1.98 m)
- Listed weight: 190 lb (86 kg)

Career information
- High school: Trenton (Trenton, New Jersey)
- College: Temple (1935–1938)
- Playing career: 1938–1949
- Position: Forward / center
- Number: 28, 10, 11, 13

Career history
- 1938–1939: Philadelphia Sphas
- 1939–1940: Washington Brewers
- 1940–1941: Baltimore Clippers
- 1941–1945: Trenton Tigers
- 1945–1948: Baltimore Bullets
- 1948: Boston Celtics
- 1948–1949: Minneapolis Lakers
- 1949: Chicago Stags

Career highlights
- BAA champion (1949); ABL champion (1946); Consensus All-American (1938); NIT champion (1938)

Career BAA statistics
- Points: 634
- Assists: 70
- Stats at NBA.com
- Stats at Basketball Reference

Meyer "Mike" Bloom (January 14, 1915 – June 5, 1993) was an American professional basketball player.

He attended Trenton Central High School, earning state basketball championships in 1932, 1933 and 1934.

Born in New York City, he played collegiately for the Temple University.

He played for the Baltimore Bullets and Boston Celtics (1947–48), Minneapolis Lakers and Chicago Stags (1948–49) in the BAA for 93 games.

== BAA career statistics ==
Legend
| GP | Games played | FG% | Field-goal percentage |
| FT% | Free-throw percentage | APG | Assists per game |
| PPG | Points per game | **Bold** | Career high |

=== Regular season ===
| Year | Team | GP | FG% | FT% | APG | PPG |
|---|---|---|---|---|---|---|
| 1947–48 | Baltimore | **34** | **.272** | .715 | .7 | **11.1** |
| 1947–48 | Boston | 14 | **.272** | .649 | **1.0** | 9.2 |
| 1948–49 | Minneapolis | 24 | .141 | .725 | .6 | 2.3 |
| 1948–49 | Chicago | 21 | .247 | **.794** | .8 | 3.4 |
| Career | | 93 | .255 | .713 | .8 | 6.8 |

=== Playoffs ===
| Year | Team | GP | FG% | FT% | APG | PPG |
|---|---|---|---|---|---|---|
| 1948 | Boston | **3** | **.262** | .737 | **.7** | **12.0** |
| 1949 | Chicago | 1 | .000 | **1.000** | .0 | 2.0 |
| Career | | 4 | .262 | .762 | .5 | 9.5 |

== See also ==
- List of select Jewish basketball players
