= Teddy Kearns =

American baseball player (1900–1949)

- First baseman
- Born: January 1, 1900; Trenton, New Jersey, U.S.
- Died: December 12, 1949 (aged 49); Trenton, New Jersey, U.S.
- Batted: Right Threw: Right

MLB debut
- October 1, 1920, for the Philadelphia Athletics

Last MLB appearance
- April 28, 1925, for the Chicago Cubs

MLB statistics
- Batting average: .263
- Home runs: 0
- Runs batted in: 1
- Stats at Baseball Reference

Teams
- Philadelphia Athletics (1920); Chicago Cubs (1924–1925)

Edward Joseph Kearns (January 1, 1900 – December 12, 1949) was an American Major League Baseball first baseman. He played for the Philadelphia Athletics during the 1920 season and the Chicago Cubs during the 1924 and 1925 seasons. Known in both baseball and basketball as Teddy Kearns, he also played pro basketball, including several seasons with the Trenton Bengals. Edward died on December 12, 1949, in Trenton, New Jersey. He was just 49 years old.
