= Trenton Tigers =

American basketball team

The Trenton Tigers were an American basketball team based in Trenton, New Jersey that was a member of the American Basketball League. However, it's suggested that the franchise not only had its roots going as far as the original National Basket Ball League, but also within other leagues like the Eastern Basketball League, the Metropolitan Basketball League, the alternative version of the original National Basketball League, and even the original iteration of the original American Basketball League alongside the Tri-State Basketball League and a revived version of the Eastern Basketball League by competing under different team names that also included the Trenton (Royal) Bengals and (supposedly) the Trenton Moose as well.

In the 1946/47 season, the team made it to the championship playoffs where they were to meet the Baltimore Bullets, who had a monstrous 31–3 record to conclude their season. Trenton was declared champion when Baltimore decided to quit the playoffs to play in the 1947 World Professional Basketball Tournament, which was considered to be a forfeit by the ABL. However, the way the ABL's playoffs concluded would be seen as a major factor for the ABL's decline in the following seasons afterward alongside the rise of the Basketball Association of America before it eventually merged with the National Basketball League from the late 1930s and the entire 1940s decade to become the present-day National Basketball Association.

During the 1949/50 season, the team moved to Cohoes, New York before the start of 1950 and became the Cohoes Marras before they dropped out of the league on February 1, 1950.

== Year-by-year ==
Year	League	Reg. season	Playoffs
1941/42	ABL	4th (1st half); 2nd (2nd half)	No playoff
1942/43	ABL	1st	Finals
1943/44	ABL	3rd (1st half); 2nd (2nd half)	Did not qualify
1944/45	ABL	2nd	Playoffs
1945/46	ABL	5th	Did not qualify
1946/47	ABL	3rd, Southern	Champions (No Finals Played)
1947/48	ABL	3rd	Playoffs
1948/49	ABL	3rd	Playoffs
1949/50	ABL	7th	N/A
