= Hartford Hurricanes =

1940s American basketball team

The Hartford Hurricanes were an American basketball team based in Hartford, Connecticut that was a member of the American Basketball League.

The team was previously known as the Elizabeth Braves who moved from Elizabeth, New Jersey, during the 1947/48 season on December 19, 1947, under owner Walter Conlin. The team was rebranded due to internal conflicts between investors.

== Year-by-year ==
Year	League	Reg. season	Playoffs
1946/47	ABL	4th, Northern	Did not qualify
1947/48	ABL	5th	Did not qualify
1948/49	ABL	6th	Did not qualify
1949/50	ABL	6th	Did not qualify

== Notable coaches ==
- Jack O'Brien
- Tubby Raskin (1902–1981), basketball player and coach
