= Passaic Red Devils =

Former American basketball team in the Bronx

- Short name: Reds
- Sport: Basketball
- Founded: 1935
- Folded: 1936
- League: American Basketball League
- Region: Bronx, New York, USA
- Team history: Trenton Bengals (1935–1936); Paterson Panthers (1935)
- Arena: Trenton Arena

The Passaic Red Devils (formerly known as the Patterson Panthers and Trenton Bengals) was a short lived American basketball team based in the Bronx, New York that was a member of the American Basketball League.

The team was initially known as the Paterson Panthers and based in Paterson, New Jersey, but changed their name to the Trenton Bengals on December 13, 1935. They took on the name Passiac Red Devils on January 2, 1936.

== History ==
The Passaic Red Devils formed in 1935, originally as the Paterson Panthers based in Paterson, New Jersey. Poor attendance and financial challenges led ownership to relocate the team during the first half of the season. League records list the Panthers as competing only in the first half standings. In December 1935, the team moved to Trenton, New Jersey, and was renamed the Trenton Bengals. The Bengals competed briefly before another relocation later in the season. The Trenton version of the team is recorded separately in ABL standings and franchise listings. In January 1936, the franchise relocated to Passaic, New Jersey, and adopted the name Passaic Red Devils. The team completed the second half of the 1935–36 ABL season under this identity. The team folded at the conclusion of the 1935-36 ABL season.

== Season-by-season results ==
Year	League	GP	W	L	Reg. season	Playoffs
1935/36	ABL	34	12	22	6th (2nd half)	Did not qualify

== Head coaches ==
- Bennie Borgmann (1935)
- Freddie Romp (1936)
