= Trenton Bengals =

American Basketbal League team based in New Jersey

Trenton Bengals/Royal Bengals
- Sport: Basketball
- League: American Basketball League
- Region: Trenton, New Jersey, USA

The Trenton Bengals, also called the Royal Bengals, was a Trenton, New Jersey–based team in the American Basketball League (ABL), the first professional basketball league in the United States.

It only participated in one ABL season (1928–29), finishing 6th.

== Year-by-year ==
Year	League	Reg. season	Playoffs
1928–29	ABL	6th (1st half); 6th (2nd half)	Did not qualify
