= 1939–40 Kingston Colonials season =

- League: American Basketball League (revived original)
- Head coach: Barney Sedran
- General manager: Ted Collins(?); Barney Sedran(?)
- Owner(s): Kate Smith; Ted Collins
- Arena: Kingston State Armory

Results
- Record: 8–4 (.667)
- Place: Conference: N/A (Unofficially 6th)
- Playoff finish: Did not qualify. (Merged operations with the Troy Haymakers to become the Troy Celtics on December 19, 1939.)

The 1939–40 Kingston Colonials season was the eighteenth and final professional basketball season played by the Kingston Colonials franchise while competing in the revived version of the American Basketball League. It would also be their fifth and final season competing in the revived version of the ABL after previously competing in the Hudson River Basketball League, the New York State Basketball League multiple times in their tenure, the Interstate Basketball League under a brief period of time, and finally the Metropolitan Basketball League before not being able to compete in a professional basis from 1928 until 1935. The ABL would start this season out with eight teams competing in their league, but would finish the season with only five teams remaining in the league due to a combination of team mergers and a withdrawal at hand. One of the mergers would end up coming from Kingston, however, as despite them starting the season out as one of the best teams in the league alongside the Philadelphia SPHAs with an 8–4 record to their name, the Colonials still had a hard time drawing in fans and would suffer financially in the process of it all. This resulted in the Kingston Colonials deciding to merge their operations with the Troy Haymakers on December 19, 1939, with those two teams managing to stop existing as they were and instead continuing to exist together as the Troy Celtics for the rest of the season, albeit with this newly merged team using the record of the Troy Haymakers at the time for the rest of the season instead of the Kingston Colonials due to them deciding to continue their operations in Troy, New York instead of Kingston, New York. The season later ended with not only a second merger occurring between the defending ABL champion New York Jewels and the previous ABL champion Jersey Reds (though the Jewels would keep their name and operations intact by comparison to Kingston or Troy), but also with the Troy Celtics getting a third-place finish in the regular season (behind a tie between the Washington Heurich Brewers and the Philadelphia SPHAs) and a second-place finish in the uniquely done ABL Round-Robin Tournament behind only the eventual new ABL champion Philadelphia SPHAs. However, had the Kingston Colonials continued operating as a team for the rest of the season, it can be seen as possible for them to finish the season as either one of the best teams of the league themselves or become the new league champions instead.

== Roster ==
Due to information on American Basketball League players being generally hard to find, there are bound to be more gaps and/or inaccuracies found in certain areas on the team's roster spots than usual.

Player	Position(s)
Pete Berenson	G/F
Harry Fitzpatrick	G
Bernie Fliegel	C
Carl Johnson	G
Sam Kaplan	G
Ben Kramer	F
Joe Murphy	F/C
Chick Reiser	G/F

== American Basketball League Standings ==
Pos.	League Standings	Wins	Losses	Win %
T–1	Philadelphia SPHAs^{[a]}	19	13	.594
T–1	Washington Heurich Brewers^{[a]}	19	13	.594
3	Troy Celtics^{[b]}	19	15	.559
4	New York Jewels^{[c]}	15	15	.500
5	Baltimore Clippers	15	16	.484
6*	Kingston Colonials^{[b]}	8	4	.667
7*	Jersey Reds^{[c]}	7	14	.333
8*	Troy Haymakers^{[b]}	3	9	.250
9*	Wilkes-Barre Barons^{[d]}	5	17	.227

* – Unofficial placement for the team this season.

== Notes ==
^{a} The Philadelphia Sphas would defeat the Washington Heurich Brewers on March 9, 1940, with a 34–27 final score to secure first place officially with what could be considered a 20–13 record (.606 win percentage) on the Sphas' end and a 19–14 record (.576 win percentage) on the Heurich Brewers' end instead of an officially recorded 19–13 record (.594 win percentage) for both teams.
^{b} Despite being tied with the Sphas for what could be considered as the best team in the ABL at that point in time during this season with an 8–4 record, the Kingston Colonials would end up merging operations with the Troy Haymakers to become the Troy Celtics (which could really be considered the spiritual successors of the Original Celtics franchise under a different location and name) on December 19, 1939, with the merged franchises foolishly continuing under the Troy Haymakers' 3–9 record instead of the Kingston Colonials' 8–4 record (likely because of the decision to have the merged franchise continue playing in Troy, New York instead of continuing to play and operate nearby Kingston, New York).
^{c} Both the previous ABL champion Jersey Reds and the defending ABL champion New York Jewels would merge operations on January 26, 1940, to remain as the New York Jewels for the rest of the season, with the Jewels franchise continuing on with the same win-loss record that they had before the merger occurred (with that record remaining intact as if nothing had happened with them due to them being the surviving team within the merger while the Jersey Reds effectively folded operations with a 7–14 record this season) while also making sure the Jewels franchise survived operations for at least another season.
^{d} The (original) Wilkes-Barre Barons ABL franchise dropped out of the league before officially finishing their season with the ABL on February 2, 1940, with the Barons leaving the league with the worst record of the entire league that season at 5–17.
