= 1938–39 Kingston Colonials season =

- Conference champions
- League: American Basketball League (revived original)
- Head coach: Barney Sedran
- General manager: Ted Collins(?); Barney Sedran(?)
- Owner(s): Kate Smith; Ted Collins
- Arena: Kingston State Armory

Results
- Record: 28–7 (.800)
- Place: Conference: 1st
- Playoff finish: Lost ABL Semifinals to Jersey Reds, 2–1

The 1938–39 Kingston Colonials season was the seventeenth professional basketball season played by the Kingston Colonials franchise while competing in the revived version of the American Basketball League. It would also be their fourth season competing in the revived version of the ABL after previously competing in the Hudson River Basketball League, the New York State Basketball League multiple times in their tenure, the Interstate Basketball League under a brief period of time, and finally the Metropolitan Basketball League before not being able to compete in a professional basis from 1928 until 1935. This season would be the first season in the ABL's revival (and its first overall since the 1927–28 season) where the ABL would not operate a split season format, with the league having eight teams competing in the league by having the Troy Haymakers replace the New York Celtics and having the Washington Heurichs (a works team) and the Wilkes-Barre Barons (a long-standing team) being added as new teams in the league. Before this season began, however, the Kingston Colonials would see new ownership from the now-former New York Celtics owners in singer Kate Smith and talent manager Ted Collins taking over the team from the aging Pop Morgenweck, with the new owners providing a whole new roster for the team in the process. This change in ownership would see immediate short-term improvement within Kingston, as the Colonials would lead the league with a 28–7 record for a first-place finish in the season. However, because of the way the season changed operations, the Colonials needed to compete in a newly-formed playoff format first before earning a shot at the ABL's championship, with their semifinal opponent being the defending ABL champion Jersey Reds (who were the #3 seed this season). Kingston and Jersey would split the first two games played in that series before it ended with the Reds winning the decisive third and final game with a 39–36 final score out in New Jersey, thus denying the Colonials their best shot at winning the ABL's championship that season.

== Roster ==
Due to information on American Basketball League players being generally hard to find, there are bound to be more gaps and/or inaccuracies found in certain areas on the team's roster spots than usual.

Player	Position(s)
Jules Bender	G/F
Pete Berenson	G/F
Jim Brown	G/F
Moe Dubilier	F
Harry Fitzpatrick	G
Bernie Fliegel	C
Nat Frankel	F/C
Carl Johnson	G
Samuel Kaplan	G
Ben Kramer	F
Mac Posnack	G/F
Chick Reiser	G/F

Note: Jules Bender, Jim Brown, Moe Dubilier, and Mac Posnack would not be a part of the team's playoff roster for this season for one reason or another.

== American Basketball League Standings ==
Pos.	League Standings	Wins	Losses	Win %
1	Kingston Colonials	28	7	.800
2	Philadelphia SPHAs	24	9	.727
3	Jersey Reds	19	14	.576
4	New York Jewels	19	15	.559
5	Wilkes-Barre Barons	14	22	.389
6	Troy Haymakers	12	21	.364
7	Brooklyn Visitations	7	20	.259
8	Washington Heurichs	7	22	.241

The top four teams would later compete in a playoff format this season, with the best team competing against the third-best team and the second-best team competing against the fourth-best team through a best-of-three series in the semifinal round before the winning two teams from each round would go up against each other in a best-of-three championship series.

== American Basketball League Playoffs ==
For the first time since the 1927–28 season (or ever in terms of its revived history), the American Basketball League would host a proper playoff series for their league by the end of the regular season instead of a championship series between the two best teams on each half-season of play (with potential tiebreaker series of match-ups going down after each half-season is over and done with).

=== American Basketball League Semifinals ===
(1) Kingston Colonials Vs. (3) Jersey Reds: Jersey wins series 2–1

- Game 1: March 15, 1939 @ Kingston: Jersey 39, Kingston 32
- Game 2: March 19, 1939 @ North Bergen (Jersey): Kingston 29, Jersey 25
- Game 3: March 26, 1939 @ North Bergen (Jersey): Jersey 39, Kingston 36
