= 1939–40 Troy Haymakers / Celtics season =

- League: American Basketball League (revived original)
- Head coach: Marty Friedman (3–9 as Haymakers); Barney Sedran (16–6 as Celtics)
- General manager: Ed Connors & Marty Connors(?)
- Owner(s): Ed Connors & Marty Connors
- Arena: Troy State Armory

Results
- Record: 19–15 (.559)
- Place: Conference: 3rd
- Playoff finish: Troy Celtics finished in second place in the ABL's Round-Robin Tournament behind the Philadelphia Sphas

The 1939–40 Troy Haymakers / Celtics season was unofficially considered the ninth professional basketball season ever held by the team that was known as the Original Celtics officially, as well as the second and final season ever played by the team known as the Troy Haymakers before they ended up merging operations with the Kingston Colonials to become the Troy Celtics for the rest of that season going forward. It could also potentially be seen as (at least) the 25th season of independent play as well for the overall history of the Original Celtics franchise, though it can reasonably be considered (at least) their 24th season properly due to the New York Hakoahs briefly replacing the Original Celtics entirely during the original era of the American Basketball League before it got revived in 1933 as a regional league instead of an entirely national league as the ABL had originally envisioned itself to be at the time, with it being arguable that this could actually be (at least) the 23rd season properly due to the Troy Haymakers' only full season not truly counting as an Original Celtics season properly. In any case, the Troy franchise would initially start out as the Troy Haymakers once again, though the Haymakers would start the eight team regular season (the second straight season where the ABL would not compete in its original split season formatting) out with a poor 3–9 record by comparison to the Kingston Colonials, who were considered one of the best teams of the league at the time with a 8–3 record on Kingston's end. However, by December 19, 1939, the Troy Haymakers would end up merging operations with the Kingston Colonials, with the Kingston franchise's 8–3 record surprisingly getting left behind by comparison to the Troy franchise's 3–9 record to start out their season (though this would not be the only merger to occur within the ABL this season). Following the merger's completion, Marty Friedman would be let go of as the head coach of the team and be replaced by now-former Kingston Colonials head coach Barney Sedran, with the Troy Haymakers subsequently being renamed the Troy Celtics for the rest of the season going forward by this point in time.

Luckily for the now-rebranded Troy Celtics franchise, the merger the previously named Troy Haymakers had with the Kingston Colonials earlier in the season would end up being exactly what the newly christened Troy franchise would desire for the rest of this season, as Barney Sedran's coaching for the newly implemented Troy franchise led to the Celtics reversing their fortunes for the season, going from a 3–9 start as the Troy Haymakers to finishing the season out with an above-average 19–15 record to finish the season with a third place result behind what would be the tied first place teams of the league in the Philadelphia Sphas and the newly rebranded Washington Heurich Brewers through two extra losses on Troy's ends (though if the Troy franchise had kept the original record held by the Kingston Colonials instead, there would be little to no doubt that Troy would have finished the season in first place instead of either one of those two teams in question). Still despite them not getting a first place finish to the season, the newly-branded Troy Celtics would have normally qualified for the ABL Playoffs all the same due to the regular season formatting from the previous season requiring the top four teams to compete in a semifinal round and then a championship round not long afterward. However, because of not just the Troy Celtics becoming who they are now following the merger between the Troy Haymakers and the more successful (at the time) Kingston Colonials franchises, but also the defending ABL champion New York Jewels surviving their season due to a merger on January 26, 1940 between themselves and the previous ABL champion Jersey Reds franchise alongside the (original) Wilkes-Barre Barons deciding to drop out of the league nearly a week after the Jewels' successful merger on February 2 that same year, the ABL would end up dropping their number of competitive teams for the season down from a solid eight to a dangerously low five teams remaining for the season. This would lead to the ABL ditching their originally planned ABL Playoffs set-up from the previous season in mind for a newly-planned round-robin tournament for the remaining (surviving) five teams in the league in the Philadelphia Sphas, the Washington Heurich Brewers, the (current) Troy Celtics, the (newly-merged) New York Jewels, and the Baltimore Clippers (the last of whom barely had a losing record instead of just an average at worst record) all competing (or at least planning to compete) in two different matches against each other (one at home, the other on the road) for eight total games against each other to determine the overall champion of the round-robin tournament setting, with tiebreakers being set-up later on, if necessary. Unfortunately for Troy, while the Celtics would end up winning six out of the eight games the played in that tournament, the two games they would lose to the Philadelphia Sphas within the round-robin tournament on March 16 & April 3, 1940 would later be the determining factor for the league's ultimate champions that season, as the Sphas would have a perfect 8–0 record that would be above Troy's 6–2 record there, which led to the Sphas winning the ABL's championship once again in their history after the Troy Celtics had their closest shot at winning an ABL championship yet following their original first two seasons in the original ABL as the Original Celtics. Following this season's conclusion, however, the Troy Celtics would end up losing access to the Troy State Armory due to the U.S. military utilizing it in likely preparations for World War II should they be called up for it, which led to the Troy Celtics only briefly playing under that name before they later permanently went by the Brooklyn Celtics name for the rest of that season due to the team finding a new home in the nearby city of Brooklyn for that following season of play.

== Roster ==
Due to information on American Basketball League players being generally hard to find, there are bound to be more gaps and/or inaccuracies found in certain areas on the team's roster spots than usual.

1939–40 Troy Haymakers / Celtics roster
Players

Pos.	No.	Player	Height	Weight	DOB	From
F		Dave Bass	6 ft 1 in (1.85 m)	195 lb (88 kg)	1911-06-21	CCNY
G/F		Pete Berenson	5 ft 10 in (1.78 m)	180 lb (82 kg)	1912-10-16	CCNY
F		Cy Boardman	6 ft 2 in (1.88 m)	185 lb (84 kg)	1915-08-24	NYU
G		Harry Fitzpatrick	5 ft 9 in (1.75 m)	170 lb (77 kg)	1913-05-22	No college
C		Bernie Fliegel	6 ft 3 in (1.91 m)	195 lb (88 kg)	1913-05-13	CCNY
G/F		Moe Frankel	5 ft 10 in (1.78 m)	190 lb (86 kg)	1913-01-25	No college
G		Carl Johnson	5 ft 8 in (1.73 m)	150 lb (68 kg)	1909-10-19	No college
G/F		Samuel Kaplan	5 ft 10 in (1.78 m)	160 lb (73 kg)	1912-12-22	No college
C		Sol Kopitko	6 ft 6 in (1.98 m)	185 lb (84 kg)	1912-09-28	CCNY
G		Mickey Kupperberg	5 ft 11 in (1.80 m)	185 lb (84 kg)	1914-03-17	Minnesota
G		Joe Polcha	5 ft 11 in (1.80 m)	170 lb (77 kg)	1917-02-24	No college
G/F		Chick Reiser	5 ft 11 in (1.80 m)	165 lb (75 kg)	1914-12-17	Pratt Institute
F/C		Irv Schneider	6 ft 3 in (1.91 m)	200 lb (91 kg)	1916-01-11	Abraham Lincoln HS (NY)
G		Nick Shaback	5 ft 11 in (1.80 m)	180 lb (82 kg)	1918-09-10	James Monroe HS (NY)
G/F		Corky Stanton	6 ft 0 in (1.83 m)	180 lb (82 kg)	1914-02-21	Union College
F/C		Bob Synnott	6 ft 3 in (1.91 m)	190 lb (86 kg)	1912-09-27	Theodore Roosevelt HS (NY)

Coaches
Head coach

Marty Friedman (Haymakers)
Barney Sedran (Celtics)

Legend
- (DP) Unsigned draft pick
- (FA) Free agent
- (S) Suspended
- Injured

When the Kingston Colonials and Troy Haymakers merged operations to become the Troy Celtics on December 19, 1939 during the early portion of the season, Troy would only keep Moe Frankel, Mickey Kuppenberg, Joe Polcha, and Corky Stanton from the original Haymakers roster onto the newly-rebranded Celtics roster, while Pete Berenson, Bernie Fliegel, Carlisle Johnson, Samuel Kaplan, and Chick Reiser from the Kingston Colonials would officially become members of the merged Troy Celtics franchise going forward for this season, with Barney Sedran from the Kingston Colonials becoming the new head coach over previous head coach Marty Friedman for the newly-merged Troy franchise for good measure as well.

== American Basketball League Standings ==
Pos.	League Standings	Wins	Losses	Win %
T–1	Philadelphia SPHAs^{[a]}	19	13	.594
T–1	Washington Heurich Brewers^{[a]}	19	13	.594
3	Troy Celtics^{[b]}	19	15	.559
4	New York Jewels^{[c]}	15	15	.500
5	Baltimore Clippers	15	16	.484
6*	Kingston Colonials^{[b]}	8	4	.667
7*	Jersey Reds^{[c]}	7	14	.333
8*	Troy Haymakers^{[b]}	3	9	.250
9*	Wilkes-Barre Barons^{[d]}	5	17	.227

* – Unofficial placement for the team this season.

== ABL Round-Robin Tournament Standings ==
Pos.	League Standings	Wins	Losses	Win %
1	Philadelphia SPHAs	8	0	1.000
2	Troy Celtics^{[b]}	6	2	.750
3	New York Jewels^{[c]}	3	4	.429
4	Washington Heurich Brewers	1	6	.143
5	Baltimore Clippers	1	7	.125

One game between the New York Jewels and the Washington Heurich Brewers ultimately became cancelled near the end of the Round Robin Tournament.

== ABL Round-Robin Tournament ==
Due to the unique circumstances involved with this season of play (namely seeing the eight-team league go down to only five competitive teams by the end of the season due to multiple team mergers and a folding occur in the case of the (original) Wilkes-Barre Barons franchise), the ABL would implement their first and only round-robin tournament setting instead of a more typical playoff format like what was done in some past ABL seasons or like within the rivaling National Basketball League or even only utilizing a championship round with the two best teams of the league (in this case, the Philadelphia Sphas and the Washington Heurich Brewers) similar to most other ABL seasons by comparison. With this round-robin tournament, the remaining five teams from this season (the Philadelphia Sphas, Washington Heurich Brewers, Troy Celtics, New York Jewels, and Baltimore Clippers) would compete in a unique tournament where each of the five remaining ABL teams would compete against each other twice (once at home and once on the road, though it wouldn't always be the case during this tournament) in order to help determine the champion of the ABL (with a potential tiebreaker series later being in mind if it was deemed necessary in the end). Unfortunately for the since-merged Troy Celtics, they would end up losing two key games against the Philadelphia Sphas on March 16 & April 3, 1940 to end their run in the round-robin tournament with a 6–2 record after defeating each of the Washington Heurich Brewers, New York Jewels, and Baltimore Clippers twice each in that round-robin tournament, leading to the Troy franchise finishing their round-robin tournament run with a close second place finish after previously finishing their overall regular season period with a third place finish following the merger between the Troy Haymakers and the Kingston Colonials to have the merged franchises become the Troy Celtics for the rest of the season.

ABL Round-Robin Tournament
Game	Date	Opponent	Score	Record
Game 1	March 3	@ Washington Heurich Brewers	32–24^{[e]}	1–0
Game 2	March 6	New York Jewels^{[c]}	27–26	2–0
Game 3	March 13	Washington Heurich Brewers	44–32	3–0
Game 4	March 16	@ Philadelphia Sphas	29–32	3–1
Game 5	March 27	Baltimore Clippers	37–27	4–1
Game 6	March 29	@ Baltimore Clippers	37–24	5–1
Game 7	March 31	@ New York Jewels^{[c]}	38–31	6–1
Game 8	April 3	Philadelphia Sphas	28–32	6–2

The Troy Celtics would end the ABL's Round-Robin Tournament with a 6–2 record, finishing it in second place due to them only losing two total games there to the eventual champion Philadelphia Sphas.

== Notes ==
^{a} The Philadelphia Sphas would defeat the Washington Heurich Brewers on March 9, 1940, with a 34–27 final score to secure first place officially with what could be considered a 20–13 record (.606 win percentage) on the Sphas' end and a 19–14 record (.576 win percentage) on the Heurich Brewers' end instead of an officially recorded 19–13 record (.594 win percentage) for both teams.
^{b} Despite being tied with the Sphas for what could be considered as the best team in the ABL at that point in time during this season with an 8–4 record, the Kingston Colonials would end up merging operations with the Troy Haymakers to become the Troy Celtics (which could really be considered the spiritual successors of the Original Celtics franchise under a different location and name) on December 19, 1939, with the merged franchises foolishly continuing under the Troy Haymakers' 3–9 record instead of the Kingston Colonials' 8–4 record (likely because of the decision to have the merged franchise continue playing in Troy, New York instead of continuing to play and operate nearby Kingston, New York).
^{c} Both the previous ABL champion Jersey Reds and the defending ABL champion New York Jewels would merge operations on January 26, 1940, to remain as the New York Jewels for the rest of the season, with the Jewels franchise continuing on with the same win-loss record that they had before the merger occurred (with that record remaining intact as if nothing had happened with them due to them being the surviving team within the merger while the Jersey Reds effectively folded operations with a 7–14 record this season) while also making sure the Jewels franchise survived operations for at least another season.
^{d} The (original) Wilkes-Barre Barons ABL franchise dropped out of the league before officially finishing their season with the ABL on February 2, 1940, with the Barons leaving the league with the worst record of the entire league that season at 5–17.
^{e} The opening match of the ABL's Round-Robin Tournament held on March 3, 1940 on the road against the Washington Heurich Brewers ended prematurely with four minutes left to go in the game when Washington's general manager, Bob McDonald, pulled his team out of the match following a few bad calls from referees Chuck Soladare (alternatively spelled Chuck Solodare), Clifford "Curly" White, and Dutch Husiwood (the last of whom was an African-American referee that notably worked with New York Renaissance games in the past). While there was a meeting involved to determine whether the game would be replayed sometime afterward, the final score ultimately stood with the Troy Celtics getting their first victory in the ABL's Round-Robin Tournament in the process.
