= 1939–40 Wilkes-Barre Barons season =

- League: American Basketball League (revived original)
- Head coach: Allie Schuckman (3–6); Honey Russell (2–11)
- General manager: Johnny Mock
- Owner(s): Johnny Mock
- Arena: Ninth Infantry Regiment Armory

Results
- Record: 5–17 (.227)
- Place: Conference: N/A (Unofficially 8th/9th)
- Playoff finish: Did not qualify. (Withdrew from the ABL on February 2, 1940.)

The 1939–40 Wilkes-Barre Barons season was officially the ninth professional basketball season played by the Wilkes-Barre Barons franchise while they were competing in the revived version of the American Basketball League this time around. This would also be their second (and initially, final) season competing in the revived version of the ABL after previously competing in the Pennsylvania State Basketball League and then briefly competing in the Eastern Basketball League. Entering this season, the Barons started out as one of eight teams competing for the ABL's championship this season before it ended up with only five teams surviving by the end of the season due to a combination of some mergers and a team withdrawal. For Wilkes-Barre, team owner Johnny Mock expressed his great displeasure against both the ABL's management and the way both the Kingston Colonials and the Jersey Reds dispersed their talented players out to the rest of the league (primarily the Barons themselves) after their teams were merged with the Troy Haymakers turned Celtics and New York Jewels respectively. When the two team mergers occurred throughout December 1939 and January 1940 respectively, Wilkes-Barre would only be granted access to the least talented players from both the Kingston Colonials and Jersey Reds teams when both Troy and the New York Jewels each got the strongest players from the respective teams they had merged operations with during the season. As a result of what was seen as the talent gap widening between the Barons and the rest of the ABL by this point in time, the Wilkes-Barre Barons would decide to withdraw their operations from the ABL by February 2, 1940, with an unofficial last place finish through a below-average 5–17 record. Not only did this result in the ABL deciding to implement an improvised round-robin tournament to determine the league's champions for this season after being down to only five competitive teams for the rest of this season, but the Wilkes-Barre Barons would once again return to being an independent team, if not minor league basketball team until they eventually returned to the ABL in 1947 after having a championship season in the Eastern Pennsylvania Basketball League that would actually help create during its inaugural season there through the 1946–47 season.

== Roster ==
Due to information on American Basketball League players being generally hard to find, there are bound to be more gaps and/or inaccuracies found in certain areas on the team's roster spots than usual.

1939–40 Wilkes-Barre Barons roster
Players

Pos.	No.	Player	Height	Weight	DOB	From
G	8	Jules Bender	5 ft 11 in (1.80 m)	160 lb (73 kg)	1914-04-02	Long Island
F		Ray Bowman	6 ft 1 in (1.85 m)	180 lb (82 kg)	1914-12-06	Scranton
G		John Buckley			Unknown	Bucknell Junior College
G		Manny Citrin	5 ft 9 in (1.75 m)	165 lb (75 kg)	1916-06-10	No college
F/C		Ed Coleman	6 ft 4 in (1.93 m)	200 lb (91 kg)	1916-08-09	Scranton
G		Ed Conaty	5 ft 11 in (1.80 m)	165 lb (75 kg)	1911-10-28	St. Francis Brooklyn
F		Lou Coopey	6 ft 2 in (1.88 m)	170 lb (77 kg)	1914-01-30	No college
G/F	1	Moe Dubilier	6 ft 2 in (1.88 m)	210 lb (95 kg)	1915-02-20	John Marshall University
F/C	6	Ben Ford	6 ft 5 in (1.96 m)	190 lb (86 kg)	1920-02-18	East Stroudsburg State
G		Art Heffner	6 ft 1 in (1.85 m)	200 lb (91 kg)	1916-12-12	Kutztown
C	2	Murray Heilweil	6 ft 3 in (1.91 m)	180 lb (82 kg)	1911-05-01	St. John's
F/C	7	Dixie Lee	6 ft 0 in (1.83 m)	170 lb (77 kg)	1917	No college
F	2	Lou Lefkowitz	5 ft 11 in (1.80 m)	175 lb (79 kg)	1917-10-19	CCNY
G	4	Bibby Martens	5 ft 9 in (1.75 m)	165 lb (75 kg)	1914-07-14	John Marshall University
F		Red Paris	5 ft 8 in (1.73 m)	150 lb (68 kg)	1918-01-08	CCNY
G/F		Honey Russell	5 ft 11 in (1.80 m)		1911-09-10	St. John's
F/C		Irv Schneider	6 ft 3 in (1.91 m)	200 lb (91 kg)	1916-01-11	Abraham Lincoln HS (NY)
G	9	Mickey Schoenfeld	5 ft 5 in (1.65 m)	130 lb (59 kg)	1917-07-31	George Washington
G/F		Allie Schuckman	5 ft 8 in (1.73 m)	155 lb (70 kg)	1907-11-25	St. John's
G		Nick Shaback	5 ft 11 in (1.80 m)	180 lb (82 kg)	1918-09-10	James Monroe HS (NY)
F/C		Bob Synnott	6 ft 3 in (1.91 m)	190 lb (86 kg)	1912-09-27	Theodore Roosevelt HS (NY)
F/C		Barney Wilk	6 ft 6 in (1.98 m)	220 lb (100 kg)	1920-06-07	Essex County Junior College

Coaches
Head coach

Allie Schuckman
Honey Russell

Legend
- (DP) Unsigned draft pick
- (FA) Free agent
- (S) Suspended
- Injured

== American Basketball League Standings ==
Pos.	League Standings	Wins	Losses	Win %
T–1	Philadelphia SPHAs^{[a]}	19	13	.594
T–1	Washington Heurich Brewers^{[a]}	19	13	.594
3	Troy Celtics^{[b]}	19	15	.559
4	New York Jewels^{[c]}	15	15	.500
5	Baltimore Clippers	15	16	.484
6*	Kingston Colonials^{[b]}	8	4	.667
7*	Jersey Reds^{[c]}	7	14	.333
8*	Troy Haymakers^{[b]}	3	9	.250
9*	Wilkes-Barre Barons^{[d]}	5	17	.227

* – Unofficial placement for the team this season.

== Notes ==
^{a} The Philadelphia Sphas would defeat the Washington Heurich Brewers on March 9, 1940, with a 34–27 final score to secure first place officially with what could be considered a 20–13 record (.606 win percentage) on the Sphas' end and a 19–14 record (.576 win percentage) on the Heurich Brewers' end instead of an officially recorded 19–13 record (.594 win percentage) for both teams.
^{b} Despite being tied with the Sphas for what could be considered as the best team in the ABL at that point in time during this season with an 8–4 record, the Kingston Colonials would end up merging operations with the Troy Haymakers to become the Troy Celtics (which could really be considered the spiritual successors of the Original Celtics franchise under a different location and name) on December 19, 1939, with the merged franchises foolishly continuing under the Troy Haymakers' 3–9 record instead of the Kingston Colonials' 8–4 record (likely because of the decision to have the merged franchise continue playing in Troy, New York instead of continuing to play and operate nearby Kingston, New York).
^{c} Both the previous ABL champion Jersey Reds and the defending ABL champion New York Jewels would merge operations on January 26, 1940, to remain as the New York Jewels for the rest of the season, with the Jewels franchise continuing on with the same win-loss record that they had before the merger occurred (with that record remaining intact as if nothing had happened with them due to them being the surviving team within the merger while the Jersey Reds effectively folded operations with a 7–14 record this season) while also making sure the Jewels franchise survived operations for at least another season.
^{d} The (original) Wilkes-Barre Barons ABL franchise dropped out of the league before officially finishing their season with the ABL on February 2, 1940, with the Barons leaving the league with the worst record of the entire league that season at 5–17.
