= 1940–41 Troy / Brooklyn Celtics season =

- League: American Basketball League (revived original)
- Head coach: Barney Sedran
- General manager: Ed Connors & Marty Connors(?)
- Owner(s): Ed Connors & Marty Connors
- Arena: Troy State Armory (Troy Celtics)? Broadway Arena (Brooklyn Celtics)

Results
- Record: 15–11 (.577)
- Place: Conference: 4th (1st half in Troy / Brooklyn); 1st (2nd half in Brooklyn)
- Playoff finish: Brooklyn Celtics lost ABL championship 3–1 to Philadelphia Sphas

The 1940–41 Troy / Brooklyn Celtics season was unofficially considered the tenth professional basketball season ever held by the team that was known as the Original Celtics officially, as well as the second season ever played by the Troy Celtics before they ended up moving from Troy, New York to Brooklyn, New York to become the Brooklyn Celtics for what would (unofficially) become the second and final time in the franchise's history after the Original Celtics first played in the original ABL back in the 1926–27 season when that team left the NBL that's unrelated to the currently rivaling National Basketball League and effectively replaced the Brooklyn Arcadians for the rest of the first half of that season to become the Brooklyn Celtics for the rest of that season going forward there. It could also potentially be seen as (at least) the 26th season of independent play as well for the overall history of the Original Celtics franchise, though it can reasonably be considered (at least) their 25th season properly due to the New York Hakoahs briefly replacing the Original Celtics entirely during the original era of the American Basketball League before it got revived in 1933 as a regional league instead of an entirely national league as the ABL had originally envisioned itself to be at the time, with it being arguable that this could actually be (at least) the 24th season properly due to the Troy Haymakers' only full season not truly counting as an Original Celtics season properly. In any case, while the Troy Celtics did start out the season under their original Troy Celtics name following their previous season where they would use it for a majority of the following season of play due to the previous Troy Haymakers merger with the Kingston Colonials, the Celtics would only go under the Troy Celtics name once again under what would be considered a temporary basis due to their original home venue, the Troy State Armory, essentially being used up by the U.S. military in preparations for a likely attack to come forth in World War II, which led to the Celtics franchise primarily playing as a road team at first before eventually finding a new home venue for the rest of the season sometime in December 1940 with the Broadway Arena, which led to the Troy Celtics officially becoming the Brooklyn Celtics for the rest of the season (which would become a split season once again for the ABL in this case) going forward. Not only that, but the Celtics sought to return to ABL's championship round to have a second chance at winning the league's championship (once again if one were to include the Original Celtics franchise's history with this franchise's history) after previously being so close, yet so far away from winning it all over the Philadelphia Sphas in the first and only season where the ABL implemented a round-robin tournament to determine the league's champion for their season.

Due to the ABL only having a lowly five total teams competing throughout this entire season, the league would decide to utilize the original split season format they first had in their league once again with the same five (surviving) teams from the previous season competing once again throughout the entirety of the ABL's whole season of competitive play. For the Celtics, due (in part) to them having issues with finding a home court to play in (to the point of moving their franchise's operations from Troy, New York to nearby Brooklyn by December 1940 just to survive as a proper team for this season, never mind having a tough time trying to schedule home games during that half of the season in particular (with one home game of theirs against the Philadelphia Sphas being hosted at the home venue of the New York Jewels at the time instead of either known home location of theirs)), they would end their first half of the season with a very disappointing, below average 4–7 record that had them ahead of only the Baltimore Clippers for a fourth place finish in the first half of the season (with the defending champion Philadelphia Sphas holding the first place spot there with an 11–4 record). However, once the Celtics settled into their new home location by going from the smaller Troy to the larger Brooklyn area, their second half of the season would be a lot more successful for them, as they would finish that half of the season with an impressive 11–4 record of their own accord (with the defending champion Sphas weirdly falling down to fourth place with a below-average 7–9 record this time around) to take the first place spot for the second half of the season. Luckily for the Celtics, the split season formatting would have it where the first half champion Philadelphia Sphas (who had surprisingly struggled for the second half of the season) would go up against the champions of the second half of the season, which would be the Troy turned Brooklyn Celtics, in a best of five championship series. While Brooklyn would split the first two games played with Philadelphia (with the home game they won being played in Saratoga Springs, New York instead of within the New York City region that Brooklyn was in), the Celtics would end up losing the championship series 3–1 following a close Game 4 loss to the defending champion turned repeating champion Sphas, which led to the Celtics failing to achieve their goal of being ABL champions for the first time either ever in their history or since 1928 in the original ABL, depending on whether you see the Original Celtics' history continuing with this version of the Brooklyn Celtics or not. Worse yet, due to venue concerns combined with growing concerns for both the ABL's own stability and the possibility of World War II happening for the United States of America, the newly-branded Brooklyn Celtics would leave the ABL for the following season, with the franchise (briefly) folding operations once again by the 1942–43 season (this time under the ownership guise of former Original Celtics player John "Pete" Barry) before new ownership would not just bring back the Original Celtics franchise once more, but also have them compete in the ABL once again as the Troy Celtics yet again for the 1946–47 season (which later became the final professional basketball season played for this Celtics franchise as a whole).

== Roster ==
Due to information on American Basketball League players being generally hard to find, there are bound to be more gaps and/or inaccuracies found in certain areas on the team's roster spots than usual.

1940–41 Troy / Brooklyn Celtics roster
Players

Pos.	No.	Player	Height	Weight	DOB	From
G/F		Ben Auerbach	6 ft 1 in (1.85 m)	190 lb (86 kg)	1919-03-01	NYU
G/F		Pete Berenson	5 ft 10 in (1.78 m)	180 lb (82 kg)	1912-10-16	CCNY
G		Frank Conaty	6 ft 2 in (1.88 m)	170 lb (77 kg)	1909-12-30	No college
G		Harry Fitzpatrick	5 ft 9 in (1.75 m)	170 lb (77 kg)	1913-05-22	No college
C		Bernie Fliegel	6 ft 3 in (1.91 m)	195 lb (88 kg)	1913-05-13	CCNY
G/F		Moe Frankel	5 ft 10 in (1.78 m)	190 lb (86 kg)	1913-01-25	No college
G/F		Samuel Kaplan	5 ft 10 in (1.78 m)	160 lb (73 kg)	1912-12-22	No college
G		Mickey Kupperberg	5 ft 11 in (1.80 m)	185 lb (84 kg)	1914-03-17	Minnesota
G/F		Chick Reiser	5 ft 11 in (1.80 m)	165 lb (75 kg)	1914-12-17	Pratt Institute
G		Nick Shaback	5 ft 11 in (1.80 m)	180 lb (82 kg)	1918-09-10	James Monroe HS (NY)

Coaches
Head coach

Barney Sedran

Legend
- (DP) Unsigned draft pick
- (FA) Free agent
- (S) Suspended
- Injured

== American Basketball League Standings ==
First Half
Team	Wins	Losses	Winning %
Philadelphia SPHAs	11	4	.733
New York Jewels	9	5	.643
Washington Brewers	7	7	.500
Troy Celtics / Brooklyn Celtics^{[a]}	4	7	.364
Baltimore Clippers	3	11	.214

Second Half
Team	Wins	Losses	Winning %
Brooklyn Celtics^{[a]}	11	4	.733
New York Jewels	8	8	.500
Washington Brewers	7	8	.467
Philadelphia SPHAs	7	9	.438
Baltimore Clippers	6	10	.375

== American Basketball League Championship Series ==
Philadelphia Sphas (1st Half Champions) Vs. Brooklyn Celtics (2nd Half Champions): Philadelphia Sphas win series 3–1

Championship Series
Game	Date	Opponent	Score	Record
Game 1	April 5	@ Philadelphia Sphas	38–48	0–1
Game 2	April 6	Philadelphia Sphas^{[b]}	40–26	1–1
Game 3	April 13	@ Philadelphia Sphas	43–50	1–2
Game 4	April 14	Philadelphia Sphas	29–30	1–3

== Notes ==
^{a} At some point during the first half of the season (currently, it's not known exactly when it happened, but it happened sometime in-between November 23 and December 21, 1940 due to those two games being the last date the Troy Celtics played the Philadelphia Sphas and the first date the Brooklyn Celtics played the Philadelphia Sphas respectively), the Troy Celtics moved from Troy, New York to nearby Brooklyn, New York to become the Brooklyn Celtics. However, throughout the entire season, the Celtics would have a tough time filling out home games either in Troy or Brooklyn, meaning there would be home games played in other places with the state of New York, including a game where the Celtics had their home match being played in the venue of the New York Jewels instead of a proper home venue of theirs.
^{b} Game was played in Saratoga Springs, New York.
