= 1939–40 Washington Heurich Brewers season =

American basketball team season

- Conference champions
- League: American Basketball League (revived original)
- Head coach: Mac Posnack
- General manager: Bob McDonald
- Owner(s): Christian Heurich Brewing Company
- Arena: Heurich Gym

Results
- Record: 19–13 (.594)
- Place: Conference: T–1st
- Playoff finish: Finished the ABL's Round-Robin Tournament in fourth place behind the New York Jewels, Troy Celtics, and Philadelphia SPHAs (although Washington could have tied for last (fifth) place with the Baltimore Clippers instead had the Heurich Brewers and Jewels not cancelled their final tournament game). Won 1940 WPBT third place consolation prize match 41–30 over the Syracuse Reds.

The 1939–40 Washington Heurich Brewers season was the second professional basketball season played by the Heurich Brewers works team franchise that was operating in Washington, D.C., which officially was the only season that they operated as the Heurich Brewers specifically after they previously operated under the Heurichs name in their inaugural season of play. Originally, the Heurich Brewers were one of eight teams competing for the ABL's championship when starting out the regular season, but the league would diminish itself down to five teams by the end of the season due to a combination of multiple team mergers and a late season withdrawal to result in a change in postseason formatting. Unlike Washington's inaugural season where they would be the worst team in the league, the Heurich Brewers would improve their roster to become one of the best teams in the league for at least the regular season period, as they would end up tying with the Philadelphia SPHAs for a first place finish in the season with a 19–13 record. However, the Heurich Brewers would end up losing their first place tiebreaker match for the season with a 34–27 defeat on the road on March 9, 1940, meaning they would unofficially lose not just the regular season championship, but also potentially be considered the losing team for the ABL's championship series for at least one resource as well. Despite the disappointing conclusion to the regular season, Washington would easily qualify for what would have been a proper playoff series this time around, though due to there being only five teams remaining in the season alongside the Heurich Brewers and SPHAs, the ABL would implement a round-robin tournament setting for not just Washington and Philadelphia, but also the other remaining teams as well in the Baltimore Clippers, New York Jewels, and the recently rebranded Troy Celtics.

Unlike the rest of the ABL, the Washington Heurich Brewers would mix their round-robin tournament time with their participation in the 1940 World Professional Basketball Tournament. Unfortunately for their chances at winning the ABL's championship, it would prove to be a poor choice on their ends, especially during the period of March 3-13, 1940 (excluding the aforementioned first place tiebreaker match against the SPHAs), the Heurich Brewers would only win one single match in the ABL's Round-Robin Tournament (which would be a close win over the Baltimore Clippers) before heading off to compete in the WPBT. While they were in the second World Professional Basketball Tournament held, Washington would end up returning to their regular season form of contention, as they would go all the way into the third place consolation prize round match through a semifinal loss to the Chicago Bruins (a former ABL team that now became a rivaling National Basketball League team) before winning their third place match with a 41–30 victory over the Syracuse Reds, though the Heurich Brewers would end up being eliminated from the ABL's Round-Robin Tournament by March 24 with their 36–30 defeat to the New York Jewels on that day. Their newly revived ways of winning from the WPBT would not return to them once they had to return to the ABL's Round-Robin Tournament for the rest of the month in April, especially since they not only would compete against the Philadelphia SPHAs for their remaining games played in the league, but also had already been eliminated from championship contention by this time within the ABL's new tournament format used just for this season only. As a result of this, the Washington Heurich Brewers would get a 1–6 record (with a match against the New York Jewels being cancelled for some reason) for a fourth place finish ahead of only the aforementioned Baltimore Clippers (who had an extra loss on their ends), which resulted in a disappointing finish for an otherwise massive improvement on their ends.

== Roster ==
Due to information on American Basketball League players being generally hard to find, there are bound to be more gaps and/or inaccuracies found in certain areas on the team's roster spots than usual.

Player	Position(s)
Ralph Bennie	G/F
Mike Bloom	C
Eddie Boyle	F/C
Jim Brown	F
Kit Carson	F
Moe Dubilier	F
Ben Goldfaden	F/C
Ben Kramer	G/F
Dixie Lee	F/C
Billy Mitchell	G
Mac Posnack	G/F
Phil Rabin	G
Irving Resnick	F
Carroll Shore	G/F
Whitey Wilson	G/F

Note: None of Ralph Bennie, Eddie Boyle, Jim Brown, Kit Carson, Dixie Lee, Billy Mitchell, and Carroll Shore would be a part of the team's roster when the Heurich Brewers were competing in the ABL's Round-Robin Tournament for this season (as well as their first place tiebreaker match-up against the Philadelphia Sphas to conclude the regular season, probably). Not only that, but the team's roster for the 1940 World Professional Basketball Tournament would not feature Ben Kramer alongside the rest of the aforementioned players as well, but it would feature both Bill Brownell and Honey Russell as players that joined the rest of the remaining players that were on the team for the WPBT for this season in the 1940 year.

== American Basketball League Standings ==
Pos.	League Standings	Wins	Losses	Win %
T–1	Philadelphia SPHAs^{[a]}	19	13	.594
T–1	Washington Heurich Brewers^{[a]}	19	13	.594
3	Troy Celtics^{[b]}	19	15	.559
4	New York Jewels^{[c]}	15	15	.500
5	Baltimore Clippers	15	16	.484
6*	Kingston Colonials^{[b]}	8	4	.667
7*	Jersey Reds^{[c]}	7	14	.333
8*	Troy Haymakers^{[b]}	3	9	.250
9*	Wilkes-Barre Barons^{[d]}	5	17	.227

* – Unofficial placement for the team this season.

== ABL Round-Robin Tournament Standings ==
Pos.	League Standings	Wins	Losses	Win %
1	Philadelphia SPHAs	8	0	1.000
2	Troy Celtics^{[b]}	6	2	.750
3	New York Jewels^{[c]}	3	4	.429
4	Washington Heurich Brewers	1	6	.143
5	Baltimore Clippers	1	7	.125

One game between the New York Jewels and the Washington Heurich Brewers ultimately became cancelled near the end of the Round Robin Tournament.

== ABL Round-Robin Tournament ==
Due to the unique circumstances involved with this season of play (namely seeing the eight-team league go down to only five competitive teams by the end of the season due to multiple team mergers and a folding occur in the case of the (original) Wilkes-Barre Barons franchise), the ABL would implement their first and only round-robin tournament setting instead of a more typical playoff format like what was done in some past ABL seasons or like within the rivaling National Basketball League or even only utilizing a championship round with the two best teams of the league (in this case, the Philadelphia SPHAs and the Washington Heurich Brewers) similar to most other ABL seasons by comparison. With this round-robin tournament, the remaining five teams from this season (the Philadelphia SPHAs, Washington Heurich Brewers, Troy Celtics, New York Jewels, and Baltimore Clippers) would compete in a unique tournament where each of the five remaining ABL teams would compete against each other twice (once at home and once on the road, though it wouldn't always be the case during this tournament) in order to help determine the champion of the ABL (with a potential tiebreaker series later being in mind if it was deemed necessary in the end). Unfortunately for the Heurich Brewers, they would end up losing their opening game against the Troy Celtics on March 3, 1940 by walking out on a 32–24 defeat, which led to a chain reaction in the rest of their round-robin tournament run where, outside of a close 33–32 home victory over the Baltimore Clippers on March 10, Washington would end their tournament run with a poor 1–6 record (with their planned home game against the New York Jewels (that potentially was scheduled sometime in early April) being cancelled for some unknown reason (probably with the reason of it not mattering too much in the grand scheme of things for the season?)), which spared the Heurich Brewers from potentially tying the Clippers for a last place finish and instead got them a fourth place finish in the tournament.

ABL Round-Robin Tournament
Game	Date	Opponent	Score	Record
Game 1	March 3	Troy Celtics^{[b]}	24–32^{[e]}	0–1
Game 2	March 8	@ Baltimore Clippers	37–43	0–2
Game 3	March 10	Baltimore Clippers	33–32	1–2
Game 4	March 13	@ Troy Celtics^{[b]}	32–44	1–3
Game 5	March 24	@ New York Jewels^{[c]}	30–36	1–4
Game 6	April 6	@ Philadelphia SPHAs	44–51	1–5
Game 7	April 8	Philadelphia SPHAs^{[f]}	30–48	1–6
—	April	New York Jewels^{[c]}	Cancelled	

The Washington Heurich Brewers would end the ABL's Round-Robin Tournament with a 1–6 record, finishing it in fourth place due to them only winning one close game against the Baltimore Clippers (with one home game against the New York Jewels being cancelled for some currently unknown reason).

== World Professional Basketball Tournament ==
While the inaugural World Professional Basketball Tournament saw a few of the ABL's teams competing in the inaugural year's event, the 1940 World Professional Basketball Tournament would only see the Washington Heurich Brewers be the ABL's sole representatives for the WPBT this time around due in part to the ABL hosting a round-robin tournament for this season (despite the Heurich Brewers also competing in the ABL's round-robin tournament for this season as well). In order for Washington to make their participation work out for this year's event, the tournament was held on March 18–22, 1940, with the second iteration of the WPBT mostly hosting independently ran teams (including two all-black teams in the world famous Harlem Globetrotters and the defending WPBT champion New York Renaissance) alongside three of the rivaling National Basketball League's teams in the former ABL team known as the Chicago Bruins and the two Wisconsin-based teams in the Oshkosh All-Stars and Sheboygan Red Skins to go with the ABL's own Washington Heurich Brewers. Incidentally, the Heurich Brewers would be lucky enough to be given a first round bye (partially because of the ABL's unique situation regarding their round-robin tournament to conclude their season?) alongside the Syracuse Reds, a briefly existing team created by an Austria-Hungary (now Hungary) born immigrant named Frank Basloe that previously were from the New York State Basketball League that were also a spinoff team to his main team in the 31st Separate Company of Herkimer, New York that got created some years ago (and allegedly might have played the first-ever professional basketball game). For Washington's actual first round match within the quarterfinal round, they would go up against the Waterloo Wonders, an independent team from Waterloo, Ohio that previously upset the Clarksburg Oilers team from Clarksburg, West Virginia in their first round match held in the WPBT. Luckily for the Heurich Brewers, they would make easy work out of the Wonders with a 35–21 beatdown to automatically qualify for the semifinal round against the hometown team of the tournament in the Chicago Bruins, who were also the only NBL team competing in the WPBT this year that didn't make it to the NBL Playoffs this season. Unfortunately for Washington, Chicago would see Wibs Kautz go on a massive hot streak with 24 points scored in the semifinal round to give the Bruins a 46–38 victory for them to potentially earn a shot at the second ever WPBT championship (against the world famous (all-black) Harlem Globetrotters), while the Heurich Brewers would have to settle for a chance at winning third place against the only other team that had a bye in the WPBT this year, the aforementioned Syracuse Reds. Luckily for Washington, Phil Rabin would lead the team in scoring that night with 16 points scored to secure the third place victory with a 41–30 final score that went alongside the world famous Harlem Globetrotters barely defeating the Chicago Bruins with a close 31–29 finale to the event. Following the conclusion of the WPBT, Phil Rabin would also be named a member of the All-Tournament Team for his performances there alongside WPBT MVP Sonny Boswell of the Harlem Globetrotters, Wibs Kautz of the Chicago Bruins, Leroy Edwards of the Oshkosh All-Stars, and Pop Gates of the similarly all-black New York Renaissance, although the Washington (Heurich) Brewers would never compete in the WPBT again in subsequent years since then in order to try and repeat their success from this season.

=== Games ===
- The Washington Heurich Brewers had a bye in the first round.
- Won quarterfinal round (35–21) over the Waterloo Wonders.
- Lost semifinal round (38–46) to the Chicago Bruins.
- Won third place game (41–30) over the Syracuse Reds.

=== Awards and honors ===
- Phil Rabin, All-Tournament Team

== Notes ==
^{a} The Philadelphia Sphas would defeat the Washington Heurich Brewers on March 9, 1940, with a 34–27 final score to secure first place officially with what could be considered a 20–13 record (.606 win percentage) on the Sphas' end and a 19–14 record (.576 win percentage) on the Heurich Brewers' end instead of an officially recorded 19–13 record (.594 win percentage) for both teams.
^{b} Despite being tied with the Sphas for what could be considered as the best team in the ABL at that point in time during this season with an 8–4 record, the Kingston Colonials would end up merging operations with the Troy Haymakers to become the Troy Celtics (which could really be considered the spiritual successors of the Original Celtics franchise under a different location and name) on December 19, 1939, with the merged franchises foolishly continuing under the Troy Haymakers' 3–9 record instead of the Kingston Colonials' 8–4 record (likely because of the decision to have the merged franchise continue playing in Troy, New York instead of continuing to play and operate nearby Kingston, New York).
^{c} Both the previous ABL champion Jersey Reds and the defending ABL champion New York Jewels would merge operations on January 26, 1940, to remain as the New York Jewels for the rest of the season, with the Jewels franchise continuing on with the same win-loss record that they had before the merger occurred (with that record remaining intact as if nothing had happened with them due to them being the surviving team within the merger while the Jersey Reds effectively folded operations with a 7–14 record this season) while also making sure the Jewels franchise survived operations for at least another season.
^{d} The (original) Wilkes-Barre Barons ABL franchise dropped out of the league before officially finishing their season with the ABL on February 2, 1940, with the Barons leaving the league with the worst record of the entire league that season at 5–17.
^{e} The opening match of the ABL's Round-Robin Tournament held on March 3, 1940 on the road against the Washington Heurich Brewers ended prematurely with four minutes left to go in the game when Washington's general manager, Bob McDonald, pulled his team out of the match following a few bad calls from referees Chuck Soladare (alternatively spelled Chuck Solodare), Clifford "Curly" White, and Dutch Husiwood (the last of whom was an African-American referee that notably worked with New York Renaissance games in the past). While there was a meeting involved to determine whether the game would be replayed sometime afterward, the final score ultimately stood with the Troy Celtics getting their first victory in the ABL's Round-Robin Tournament in the process.
^{f} Game was played in Coatesville, Pennsylvania.
