= 1939–40 Baltimore Clippers season =

- League: American Basketball League (revived original)
- Head coach: John Donlon
- General manager: John Donlon(?)
- Owner(s): Henry Dopkin
- Arena: Baltimore Coliseum

Results
- Record: 15–16 (.484)
- Place: Conference: 5th
- Playoff finish: Finished the ABL's Round-Robin Tournament in last (fifth) place behind the Philadelphia Sphas, Troy Celtics, New York Jewels, and Washington Heurich Brewers (although the last place result could have been tied by Washington had the Heurich Brewers and Jewels not cancelled their final tournament game).

The 1939–40 Baltimore Clippers season was officially the first season played by the Baltimore Clippers franchise in the capital city of Baltimore. However, it's suggested that the Clippers are considered to be a continuation of the Brooklyn Visitations franchise that essentially folded operations by the end of the previous ABL season; if that's the case, this would at least be their nineteenth (professional) basketball season played instead. In any case, the ABL originally started out the season with eight teams officially competing throughout the season, but the number of teams decreased down to a total of five by the end of the season due to a combination of multiple team mergers occurring and the (original) Wilkes-Barre Barons withdrawing their operations from the ABL by February 1940. Despite the number of changes throughout this season, the Clippers would end up being the worst of the surviving teams remaining in this season due to them having a below-average 15–16 record (having one extra loss over the long-standing New York Jewels) for a fifth-place finish (which would be last place in the ABL in terms of surviving teams there). Luckily for them, due to the way the season went on the ABL's ends (with the Clippers having a close record to both the Philadelphia Sphas and Washington Heurich Brewers in spite of Baltimore having a losing record), all of the surviving teams were given a chance to win the ABL's championship for this season due to them all competing in an eight-game round-robin tournament, with each team being scheduled a home and road match against each other to determine the overall champion of the season. Unfortunately, despite them having a future Hall of Famer and the league's leading scorer for this season in Bobby McDermott joining their team for this season, the Clippers would end up having a losing experience in the ABL's Round-Robin Tournament, as following a mixed experience with their first two games played in this event, Baltimore would end up losing the rest of their games played not long afterward (starting with the March 10 rematch on the road against Washington with a close 33–32 defeat), which later led to the Clippers finishing that tournament with a dead last, fifth-place finish through a 1–7 record (though they would be close to tying with the Washington Heurich Brewers for a fourth-place finish there instead), easily failing to secure the league's championship this season.

== Roster ==
Due to information on American Basketball League players being generally hard to find, there are bound to be more gaps and/or inaccuracies found in certain areas on the team's roster spots than usual.

Player	Position(s)
Jules Bender	F
Howie Bollerman	C
Ed Conaty	G
Frank Conaty	F
Allie Esposito	G
Herbie Gershon	G
Pat Herlihy	C
Tony Kappen	G
Bibby Martens	G
Bobby McDermott	G
Bill Nash	F
John O'Brien	F
Pete Rubin	G
Allie Schuckman	G
Bob Synnott	F/C
Orville Terjesen	C

Note: None of Ed Conaty, Herbie Gershon, Pat Herlihy, Tony Kappen, Pete Rubin, or Bob Synnott would end up competing in the ABL's Round-Robin Tournament with the Clippers during this season. In addition to those guys, all three of Gus Drum, Bill Thomas, and Willie Hoppen were mentioned to be a part of the team's roster at the start of the season, yet never played a single game with the team at the time throughout the entire season.

== American Basketball League Standings ==
Pos.	League Standings	Wins	Losses	Win %
T–1	Philadelphia SPHAs^{[a]}	19	13	.594
T–1	Washington Heurich Brewers^{[a]}	19	13	.594
3	Troy Celtics^{[b]}	19	15	.559
4	New York Jewels^{[c]}	15	15	.500
5	Baltimore Clippers	15	16	.484
6*	Kingston Colonials^{[b]}	8	4	.667
7*	Jersey Reds^{[c]}	7	14	.333
8*	Troy Haymakers^{[b]}	3	9	.250
9*	Wilkes-Barre Barons^{[d]}	5	17	.227

* – Unofficial placement for the team this season.

== ABL Round-Robin Tournament Standings ==
Pos.	League Standings	Wins	Losses	Win %
1	Philadelphia SPHAs	8	0	1.000
2	Troy Celtics^{[b]}	6	2	.750
3	New York Jewels^{[c]}	3	4	.429
4	Washington Heurich Brewers	1	6	.143
5	Baltimore Clippers	1	7	.125

One game between the New York Jewels and the Washington Heurich Brewers ultimately became cancelled near the end of the Round Robin Tournament.

== ABL Round-Robin Tournament ==
Due to the unique circumstances involved with this season of play (namely seeing the eight-team league go down to only five competitive teams by the end of the season due to multiple team mergers and a folding occur in the case of the (original) Wilkes-Barre Barons franchise), the ABL would implement their first and only round-robin tournament setting instead of a more typical playoff format like what was done in some past ABL seasons or like within the rivaling National Basketball League or even only utilizing a championship round with the two best teams of the league (in this case, the Philadelphia Sphas and the Washington Heurich Brewers) similar to most other ABL seasons by comparison. With this round-robin tournament, the remaining five teams from this season (the Philadelphia Sphas, Washington Heurich Brewers, Troy Celtics, New York Jewels, and Baltimore Clippers) would compete in a unique tournament where each of the five remaining ABL teams would compete against each other twice (once at home and once on the road, though it wouldn't always be the case during this tournament) in order to help determine the champion of the ABL (with a potential tiebreaker series later being in mind if it was deemed necessary in the end). Unfortunately for the Baltimore Clippers, following their sole victory in the second game of the tournament against the Washington Heurich Brewers after losing their first match to the New York Jewels, they would end up losing the rest of their game not long afterward, finishing their run in the round-robin tournament with a poor 1–7 record after only defeating Washington once at home.

ABL Round-Robin Tournament
Game	Date	Opponent	Score	Record
Game 1	March 3	@ New York Jewels^{[c]}	21–34	0–1
Game 2	March 8	Washington Heurich Brewers	43–37	1–1
Game 3	March 10	@ Washington Heurich Brewers	32–33	1–1
Game 4	March 15	New York Jewels^{[c]}	33–34	1–2
Game 5	March 23	@ Philadelphia Sphas	36–43	1–3
Game 6	March 24	Philadelphia Sphas	32–51	1–4
Game 7	March 27	@ Troy Celtics^{[b]}	27–37	1–5
Game 8	March 29	Troy Celtics^{[b]}	24–37	1–6

The Baltimore Clippers would end the ABL's Round-Robin Tournament with a 1–7 record, finishing it in last place due to them only winning their first game played in the round-robin tournament against the Washington Heurich Brewers (though they would be close to tying the Heurich Brewers for a fourth-place finish instead).

== Awards and honors ==
By the end of the season, Bobby McDermott would end up being the leading scorer of the entire league for the seventh season of its return and the thirteenth season of its overall existence with 341 points scored with an average of 11.0 points per game. This temporarily would mark the last time where a leading scorer in the league's history would average over 10 points per game during the regular season period. Not only that, but this marked the first and only time where a leading scorer in the ABL would regain their scoring title without repeating that honor in the previous season they had gotten it in the first place, with McDermott also joining Rusty Saunders, Bennie Borgmann, and Phil Rabin as the only other players to gain the honor throughout multiple seasons in the league (either in its original iteration or in its revived format). In addition to that, as of 2026, McDermott would also join Borgmann as the only other leading scorer from the ABL's history to be inducted into the Naismith Basketball Hall of Fame.

== Notes ==
^{a} The Philadelphia Sphas would defeat the Washington Heurich Brewers on March 9, 1940, with a 34–27 final score to secure first place officially with what could be considered a 20–13 record (.606 win percentage) on the Sphas' end and a 19–14 record (.576 win percentage) on the Heurich Brewers' end instead of an officially recorded 19–13 record (.594 win percentage) for both teams.
^{b} Despite being tied with the Sphas for what could be considered as the best team in the ABL at that point in time during this season with an 8–4 record, the Kingston Colonials would end up merging operations with the Troy Haymakers to become the Troy Celtics (which could really be considered the spiritual successors of the Original Celtics franchise under a different location and name) on December 19, 1939, with the merged franchises foolishly continuing under the Troy Haymakers' 3–9 record instead of the Kingston Colonials' 8–4 record (likely because of the decision to have the merged franchise continue playing in Troy, New York instead of continuing to play and operate nearby Kingston, New York).
^{c} Both the previous ABL champion Jersey Reds and the defending ABL champion New York Jewels would merge operations on January 26, 1940, to remain as the New York Jewels for the rest of the season, with the Jewels franchise continuing on with the same win-loss record that they had before the merger occurred (with that record remaining intact as if nothing had happened with them due to them being the surviving team within the merger while the Jersey Reds effectively folded operations with a 7–14 record this season) while also making sure the Jewels franchise survived operations for at least another season.
^{d} The (original) Wilkes-Barre Barons ABL franchise dropped out of the league before officially finishing their season with the ABL on February 2, 1940, with the Barons leaving the league with the worst record of the entire league that season at 5–17.
