= 1939–40 Troy Haymakers season =

American Basketball League season

- League: American Basketball League (revived original)
- Head coach: Marty Friedman
- General manager: Ed Connors & Marty Connors(?)
- Owner(s): Ed Connors & Marty Connors
- Arena: Troy State Armory

Results
- Record: 3–9 (.250)
- Place: Conference: N/A (Unofficially 8th)
- Playoff finish: Did not qualify. (The Troy Haymakers would merge operations with the Kingston Colonials on December 19, 1939 to become the Troy Celtics for the rest of the season.)

The 1939–40 Troy Haymakers season was unofficially considered the ninth professional basketball season ever held by the team that was known as the Original Celtics officially, as well as the second and final season ever played by the team known as the Troy Haymakers. It could also potentially be seen as (at least) the 25th season of independent play as well for the overall history of the Original Celtics franchise, though it can reasonably be considered (at least) their 24th season properly due to the New York Hakoahs briefly replacing the Original Celtics entirely during the original era of the American Basketball League before it got revived in 1933 as a regional league instead of an entirely national league as the ABL had originally envisioned itself to be at the time, with it being arguable that this could actually be (at least) the 23rd season properly due to the Troy Haymakers' only full season not truly counting as an Original Celtics season properly. In any case, the Troy franchise would initially start out as the Troy Haymakers once again, though the Haymakers franchise that would start the eight team regular season (the second straight season where the ABL would not compete in its original split season formatting) held a poor 3–9 record by comparison to the Kingston Colonials, who were considered one of the best teams of the league at the time with a 8–3 record on Kingston's end. However, by December 19, 1939, the Troy Haymakers would end up merging operations with the Kingston Colonials, with the Kingston franchise's 8–3 record surprisingly getting left behind by comparison to the Troy franchise's 3–9 record to start out their season (although this would not be the only merger to occur within the ABL this season). Despite the Troy franchise technically speaking surviving for the rest of the season, the Haymakers would unofficially go defunct from the merger due to the two teams merging operations to become the Troy Celtics for the rest of the Celtics, with the Celtics operating through the Haymakers' 3–9 record and the Colonials' head coach for the rest of the season. Despite the disadvantageous position, Troy under their new Celtics name would end up getting a third place finish in the regular season and a second place finish in the improvised ABL Round-Robin Tournament to conclude the season.

== Roster ==
Due to information on American Basketball League players being generally hard to find, there are bound to be more gaps and/or inaccuracies found in certain areas on the team's roster spots than usual.

1939–40 Troy Celtics roster
Players

Pos.	No.	Player	Height	Weight	DOB	From
F		Dave Bass	6 ft 1 in (1.85 m)	195 lb (88 kg)	1911-06-21	CCNY
G/F		Pete Berenson	5 ft 10 in (1.78 m)	180 lb (82 kg)	1912-10-16	CCNY
F		Cy Boardman	6 ft 2 in (1.88 m)	185 lb (84 kg)	1915-08-24	NYU
G		Harry Fitzpatrick	5 ft 9 in (1.75 m)	170 lb (77 kg)	1913-05-22	No college
C		Bernie Fliegel	6 ft 3 in (1.91 m)	195 lb (88 kg)	1913-05-13	CCNY
G/F		Moe Frankel	5 ft 10 in (1.78 m)	190 lb (86 kg)	1913-01-25	No college
G		Carl Johnson	5 ft 8 in (1.73 m)	150 lb (68 kg)	1909-10-19	No college
G/F		Samuel Kaplan	5 ft 10 in (1.78 m)	160 lb (73 kg)	1912-12-22	No college
C		Sol Kopitko	6 ft 6 in (1.98 m)	185 lb (84 kg)	1912-09-28	CCNY
G		Mickey Kupperberg	5 ft 11 in (1.80 m)	185 lb (84 kg)	1914-03-17	Minnesota
G		Joe Polcha	5 ft 11 in (1.80 m)	170 lb (77 kg)	1917-02-24	No college
G/F		Chick Reiser	5 ft 11 in (1.80 m)	165 lb (75 kg)	1914-12-17	Pratt Institute
F/C		Irv Schneider	6 ft 3 in (1.91 m)	200 lb (91 kg)	1916-01-11	Abraham Lincoln HS (NY)
G		Nick Shaback	5 ft 11 in (1.80 m)	180 lb (82 kg)	1918-09-10	James Monroe HS (NY)
G/F		Corky Stanton	6 ft 0 in (1.83 m)	180 lb (82 kg)	1914-02-21	Union College
F/C		Bob Synnott	6 ft 3 in (1.91 m)	190 lb (86 kg)	1912-09-27	Theodore Roosevelt HS (NY)

Coaches
Head coach

Marty Friedman (Haymakers)
Barney Sedran (Celtics)

Legend
- (DP) Unsigned draft pick
- (FA) Free agent
- (S) Suspended
- Injured

When the Kingston Colonials and Troy Haymakers merged operations to become the Troy Celtics on December 19, 1939 during the early portion of the season, Troy would only keep Moe Frankel, Mickey Kuppenberg, Joe Polcha, and Corky Stanton from the original Haymakers roster onto the newly-rebranded Celtics roster, while Pete Berenson, Bernie Fliegel, Carlisle Johnson, Samuel Kaplan, and Chick Reiser from the Kingston Colonials would officially become members of the merged Troy Celtics franchise going forward for this season, with Barney Sedran from the Kingston Colonials becoming the new head coach over previous head coach Marty Friedman for the newly-merged Troy franchise for good measure as well.

== American Basketball League Standings ==
Pos.	League Standings	Wins	Losses	Win %
T–1	Philadelphia SPHAs^{[a]}	19	13	.594
T–1	Washington Heurich Brewers^{[a]}	19	13	.594
3	Troy Celtics^{[b]}	19	15	.559
4	New York Jewels^{[c]}	15	15	.500
5	Baltimore Clippers	15	16	.484
6*	Kingston Colonials^{[b]}	8	4	.667
7*	Jersey Reds^{[c]}	7	14	.333
8*	Troy Haymakers^{[b]}	3	9	.250
9*	Wilkes-Barre Barons^{[d]}	5	17	.227

* – Unofficial placement for the team this season.

== Notes ==
^{a} The Philadelphia Sphas would defeat the Washington Heurich Brewers on March 9, 1940, with a 34–27 final score to secure first place officially with what could be considered a 20–13 record (.606 win percentage) on the Sphas' end and a 19–14 record (.576 win percentage) on the Heurich Brewers' end instead of an officially recorded 19–13 record (.594 win percentage) for both teams.
^{b} Despite being tied with the Sphas for what could be considered as the best team in the ABL at that point in time during this season with an 8–4 record, the Kingston Colonials would end up merging operations with the Troy Haymakers to become the Troy Celtics (which could really be considered the spiritual successors of the Original Celtics franchise under a different location and name) on December 19, 1939, with the merged franchises foolishly continuing under the Troy Haymakers' 3–9 record instead of the Kingston Colonials' 8–4 record (likely because of the decision to have the merged franchise continue playing in Troy, New York instead of continuing to play and operate nearby Kingston, New York).
^{c} Both the previous ABL champion Jersey Reds and the defending ABL champion New York Jewels would merge operations on January 26, 1940, to remain as the New York Jewels for the rest of the season, with the Jewels franchise continuing on with the same win-loss record that they had before the merger occurred (with that record remaining intact as if nothing had happened with them due to them being the surviving team within the merger while the Jersey Reds effectively folded operations with a 7–14 record this season) while also making sure the Jewels franchise survived operations for at least another season.
^{d} The (original) Wilkes-Barre Barons ABL franchise dropped out of the league before officially finishing their season with the ABL on February 2, 1940, with the Barons leaving the league with the worst record of the entire league that season at 5–17.
