= 1940–41 Washington Brewers season =

- League: American Basketball League (revived original)
- Head coach: Mac Posnack
- General manager: Bob McDonald
- Owner(s): Christian Heurich Brewing Company
- Arena: Riverside Stadium

Results
- Record: 14–15 (.483)
- Place: Conference: 3rd (both halves)
- Playoff finish: Did not qualify

The 1940–41 Washington Brewers season was the third professional basketball season played by the Washington Brewers works team franchise that was operating in Washington, D.C., which officially was the first season that they operated as the Brewers specifically after they previously operated as both the Heurichs and the Heurich Brewers in their first two season of play. Entering this season, the Brewers would be one of five competing teams that survived from the previous season to compete for the league's championship this time around (though the Troy Celtics would move from Troy, New York to nearby Brooklyn to become the Brooklyn Celtics early on in the split season of play). This would be the team's first season where they would operate under a split season format (which revolved around the two best teams in each half of the season competing for the league's championship) after previously having a proper regular season to play in due to the ABL only having five competing teams for this entire season. For the first half of the season, Washington would get themselves an average 7–7 record to get a third-place finish to be ahead of the Baltimore Clippers and Troy turned Brooklyn Celtics, but behind the New York Jewels and the Philadelphia SPHAs there. As for the second half of the season, the Brewers would barely get a below-average record for a similarly performing 7–8 record for another third-place finish where the only differences in that half of the season would see the Philadelphia SPHAs get a fourth-place finish and the Brooklyn Celtics get a first-place finish that time. Due to the mostly average performances the team had throughout the entire season, the Washington Brewers would fail to qualify for the ABL's championship series for this season.

== Roster ==
Due to information on American Basketball League players being generally hard to find, there are bound to be more gaps and/or inaccuracies found in certain areas on the team's roster spots than usual.

Player	Position(s)
Pete Berenson	G/F
Mike Bloom	C
Howie Bollerman	C
Moe Dubilier	F
Nat Frankel	F/C
Ben Goldfaden	F/C
Ben Kramer	G/F
Mac Posnack	F
Phil Rabin	G
George Slott	F
Whitey Wilson	G
Art Zahn	F

== American Basketball League Standings ==
First Half
Team	Wins	Losses	Winning %
Philadelphia SPHAs	11	4	.733
New York Jewels	9	5	.643
Washington Brewers	7	7	.500
Troy Celtics / Brooklyn Celtics^{[a]}	4	7	.364
Baltimore Clippers	3	11	.214

Second Half
Team	Wins	Losses	Winning %
Brooklyn Celtics^{[a]}	11	4	.733
New York Jewels	8	8	.500
Washington Brewers	7	8	.467
Philadelphia SPHAs	7	9	.438
Baltimore Clippers	6	10	.375

== Notes ==
^{a} At some point during the first half of the season (currently, it's not known exactly when it happened, but it happened sometime in-between November 23 and December 21, 1940, due to those two games being the last date the Troy Celtics played the Philadelphia Sphas and the first date the Brooklyn Celtics played the Philadelphia Sphas respectively), the Troy Celtics moved from Troy, New York to nearby Brooklyn, New York to become the Brooklyn Celtics. However, throughout the entire season, the Celtics would have a tough time filling out home games either in Troy or Brooklyn, meaning there would be home games played in other places with the state of New York, including a game where the Celtics had their home match being played in the venue of the New York Jewels instead of a proper home venue of theirs.
