= 1940–41 Baltimore Clippers season =

- League: American Basketball League (revived original)
- Head coach: John Donlon
- General manager: John Donlon(?)
- Owner(s): Henry Dopkin
- Arena: Baltimore Coliseum

Results
- Record: 9–21 (.300)
- Place: Conference: 5th (both halves; overall)
- Playoff finish: Did not qualify

The 1940–41 Baltimore Clippers season was officially the second and final season played by the Baltimore Clippers franchise in the capital city of Baltimore. However, it's suggested that the Clippers are considered to be a continuation of the Brooklyn Visitations franchise that essentially folded operations by the end of the 1938–39 season; if that's the case, this would at least be their twentieth and final (professional) basketball season played instead. In any case, the ABL entered this season with the same five teams that had concluded the previous season of play finishing up this season as well (though the Washington Heurich Brewers works team would be rebranded as the Washington Brewers this time around, with the Troy Celtics moving from Troy, New York to Brooklyn, New York to become the Brooklyn Celtics during the season as well). Unfortunately for the Baltimore Clippers, they would end up becoming the weakest team in the entire league throughout the entire season played in the ABL. By the end of the first half of the season, the Clippers would end up getting a very poor 3–11 record that put them a few games behind the Troy turned Brooklyn Celtics for fourth place in that half of the season. While the second half would see them perform a little bit better than they did the first half of the season, they would still place dead last in the league with a below-average 6–10 record that was only one game behind the Philadelphia SPHAs for that specific half. While both the SPHAs and Celtics ended up being the two teams that would compete in this season's championship series, the Baltimore Clippers would not only finish in last place throughout the entire league this season, but they'd also fold operations by the end of this season as well (potentially due to the impending nature of World War II coming to the US by the end of the year 1941).

== Roster ==
Due to information on American Basketball League players being generally hard to find, there are bound to be more gaps and/or inaccuracies found in certain areas on the team's roster spots than usual.

Player	Position(s)
Mike Bloom	C
Cy Boardman	F
Howie Bollerman	C
Frank Conaty	F
Rex Ellis	F
Allie Esposito	G
Bill Formwalt	G
Dutch Garfinkel	G
Herbie Gershon	G
Carl Johnson	G
Bobby McDermott	G
Johnny Mroczkowski	G
Dutch Newman	F
John O'Brien	F
Red Paris	F
Bucky Pierson	G
Joe Polcha	G
Irving Resnick	F
Allie Schuckman	G
George Slott	F

== American Basketball League Standings ==
First Half
Team	Wins	Losses	Winning %
Philadelphia SPHAs	11	4	.733
New York Jewels	9	5	.643
Washington Brewers	7	7	.500
Troy Celtics / Brooklyn Celtics^{[a]}	4	7	.364
Baltimore Clippers	3	11	.214

Second Half
Team	Wins	Losses	Winning %
Brooklyn Celtics^{[a]}	11	4	.733
New York Jewels	8	8	.500
Washington Brewers	7	8	.467
Philadelphia SPHAs	7	9	.438
Baltimore Clippers	6	10	.375

== Notes ==
^{a} At some point during the first half of the season (currently, it's not known exactly when it happened, but it happened sometime in-between November 23 and December 21, 1940, due to those two games being the last date the Troy Celtics played the Philadelphia Sphas and the first date the Brooklyn Celtics played the Philadelphia Sphas respectively), the Troy Celtics moved from Troy, New York to nearby Brooklyn, New York to become the Brooklyn Celtics. However, throughout the entire season, the Celtics would have a tough time filling out home games either in Troy or Brooklyn, meaning there would be home games played in other places with the state of New York, including a game where the Celtics had their home match being played in the venue of the New York Jewels instead of a proper home venue of theirs.
