= 1938–39 Washington Heurichs season =

- League: American Basketball League (revived original)
- Head coach: Bob McDonald (0–2); Elmer Ripley (1–6); Joe Dreyfus (6–14)
- General manager: Bob McDonald
- Owner(s): Christian Heurich Brewing Company
- Arena: Heurich Gym

Results
- Record: 7–22 (.241)
- Place: Conference: 8th
- Playoff finish: Did not qualify

The 1938–39 Washington Heurichs season was the first professional basketball season played by the Heurichs works team franchise that was operating in Washington, D.C., which officially was the only season that they operated as the Heurichs specifically. This season would also be the first ABL season in its revival (and its first since the 1927–28 season) where the league would abandon the split season format that it would use for most of its existence up until this point in time, with its season utilizing a proper playoff format where the top four teams would compete against each other in a best-of-three semifinal round before the remaining two teams would go against each other in a best-of-five championship series. Interestingly, unlike other teams added within the ABL throughout its history, the Washington Heurichs would be added into the league a few days after its regular season began on November 7, 1938, though in order to accommodate the Heurichs' rapid assimilation into the ABL (which might have related to the rivaling newly-rivaling National Basketball League having their own works teams competing in their league throughout its existence), they would wait until December 1, 1938, to play their first home game at their local Heurich Gym within their local Christian Heurich Brewing Company in this season (with their head coaching rotation go from team general manager Bob McDonald to Elmer Ripley to former Original Celtics player Joe Dreyfus along the way). As such, the ABL would interestingly play this season in a similar manner to the newly-rivaling NBL where they briefly had seven teams competing in their league before officially retroactively making it be eight teams competing in their league for the rest of the season after a certain point in time going forward. Unfortunately for the Heurichs, they would end up being the worst team in the ABL this season, as they would finish the season with a very poor 7–22 record to have a last place finish in the league, with them even being behind the soon-to-be-defunct Brooklyn Visitations by a couple of games on their ends. This not only resulted in Washington failing to qualify for the newly implemented ABL Playoffs for this season, but it also later led to the team (briefly) changing their team name from the Heurichs to the Heurich Brewers for the following season coming up afterward.

== Roster ==
Due to information on American Basketball League players being generally hard to find, there are bound to be more gaps and/or inaccuracies found in certain areas on the team's roster spots than usual.

Player	Position(s)
Ralph Bennie	G/F
Bozie Berger	F
Bernie Buscher	G
Bucky Buscher	G
Kit Carson	F
George Freilicher	G
Ben Goldfaden	F/C
Ed Hargaden	G/F
Cliff Keyser	G
Ed Kweller	C
Bernie Lieb	G
Bibby Martens	G
Mickey Schoenfeld	G/F
Knocky Thomas	G
Whitey Wilson	G/F
Art Zahn	F

Note: The team also had Hal Chillcotte, Eddie Martin, and Waverly Wheeler appear on the roster at some point in time, though they never officially appeared in ABL games for this season.

== American Basketball League Standings ==
Pos.	League Standings	Wins	Losses	Win %
1	Kingston Colonials	28	7	.800
2	Philadelphia SPHAs	24	9	.727
3	Jersey Reds	19	14	.576
4	New York Jewels	19	15	.559
5	Wilkes-Barre Barons	14	22	.389
6	Troy Haymakers	12	21	.364
7	Brooklyn Visitations	7	20	.259
8	Washington Heurichs	7	22	.241

The top four teams would later compete in a playoff format this season, with the best team competing against the third-best team and the second-best team competing against the fourth-best team through a best-of-three series in the semifinal round before the winning two teams from each round would go up against each other in a best-of-three championship series.
