= 1941–42 Washington Brewers season =

- League: American Basketball League (revived original)
- Head coach: Mac Posnack
- General manager: Bob McDonald
- Owner(s): Christian Heurich Brewing Company
- Arena: Turner's Arena

Results
- Record: 10–13 (.435)
- Place: Conference: 3rd (1st half); T–3rd (2nd half)
- Playoff finish: Did not qualify

The 1941–42 Washington Brewers season was the fourth and final professional basketball season played by the Washington Brewers works team franchise that was operating in Washington, D.C., which officially was the second and final season that they operated as the Brewers specifically after they previously operated as both the Heurichs and the Heurich Brewers in their first two season of play. Originally, the Brewers entered this season as one of five teams competing for the ABL's championship under a split season format once again (albeit with two new teams in the Trenton Tigers and Wilmington Blue Bombers replacing the Baltimore Clippers and runner-up Brooklyn Celtics), though the league would cut the number of teams down to only four remaining teams by the start of the second half of the season. Unlike the previous season, Washington would perform as a below-average team throughout the entire season, though they would finish as an average team in terms of overall league placement throughout the season. For the first half of the season, the Brewers would get a below-average 5–6 record that placed them ahead of the New York Jewels (who would incidentally leave the ABL on a temporary basis for the second half of the season) and the Trenton Tigers, but behind the Philadelphia SPHAs and the Wilmington Blue Bombers. As for the second half of the season, Washington would end up tying with the Philadelphia SPHAs for an under par third-place finish with a below-average 5–7 that put them both a game behind the Trenton Tigers for second place and multiple games the Wilmington Blue Bombers for first place. As a result of this, not only would the Washington Brewers fail to qualify for the ABL's championship series (which would not be deemed necessary this time around due to Wilmington winning both halves of the season), but Washington would also technically fold operations as well by the end of the season, though it's considered likely that the Brewers would move to Harrisburg, Pennsylvania to become the Harrisburg Senators going forward.

== Roster ==
Due to information on American Basketball League players being generally hard to find, there are bound to be more gaps and/or inaccuracies found in certain areas on the team's roster spots than usual.

Player	Position(s)
Hook Anderson	G/F
Al Benson	C
Pete Berenson	G/F
Moe Dubilier	F
Nat Frankel	F/C
Ben Goldfaden	F/C
Herm Knuppel	C
Ben Kramer	G/F
Mac Posnack	F
Dom Restifo	G
Irv Rizzi	G/F
Willie Rubenstein	G
George Slott	F
Whitey Wilson	G

Note: In addition to all of those players, the Brewers also briefly had an unknown guard with the last name of Hoffman and an unknown player with the last name of Leal who might have been a guard named George Abel that briefly were a part of the team as well. Not only that, but Jim Kiernan would be a part of the team for exhibition matches only as well during this period of time.

== American Basketball League Standings ==
First Half
Team	Wins	Losses	Winning %
Wilmington Blue Bombers	10	3	.769
Philadelphia SPHAs	8	6	.571
Washington Brewers	5	6	.455
Trenton Tigers	5	8	.385
New York Jewels^{[a]}	1	6	.143

Second Half
Team	Wins	Losses	Winning %
Wilmington Blue Bombers	8	4	.667
Trenton Tigers	6	6	.500
Washington Brewers	5	7	.417
Philadelphia SPHAs	5	7	.417

== Awards and honors ==
By the end of the season, Nat Frankel would end up being the leading scorer of the entire league for the ninth season of its return and the fifteenth season of its overall existence with a rather low 188 points scored for an average of 9.4 points per game. This would mark the last time in the league's existence where a leading scorer in the ABL would average less than 10 points per game in a season.

== Notes ==
^{a} The New York Jewels would drop out of the ABL by the end of the first half of the season on January 15, 1942.
