= 1937–38 Kingston Colonials season =

- League: American Basketball League (revived original)
- Head coach: Pop Morgenweck (8–20); Dave Bass (6–5)
- General manager: Pop Morgenweck
- Owner(s): Pop Morgenweck
- Arena: Kingston Auditorium

Results
- Record: 14–24 (.368)
- Place: Conference: 6th (1st half); 4th (2nd half)
- Playoff finish: Did not qualify

The 1937–38 Kingston Colonials season was the sixteenth professional basketball season played by the Kingston Colonials franchise while competing in the revived version of the American Basketball League. It would also be their third season competing in the revived version of the ABL after previously competing in the Hudson River Basketball League, the New York State Basketball League multiple times in their tenure, the Interstate Basketball League under a brief period of time, and finally the Metropolitan Basketball League before not being able to compete in a professional basis from 1928 until 1935. This season would see the ABL start out with seven teams competing in their league this season, though it would finish the season with only six teams by the start of the second half of the season due to the Bronx turned New York Yankees basketball team leaving the ABL on January 11, 1938. With that in mind, the Colonials would end the first half of the season with a very poor 5–15 record to get a sixth-place finish there to be ahead of only the aforementioned Bronx turned New York Yankees basketball team that only won a single game during this half of the season. As for the second half of the season, Kingston would end up getting an average 9–9 record to have a fourth-place finish to be ahead of only the New York Celtics and the Brooklyn Visitations in that half of the season. Due to the poor results the Colonials had throughout the season, especially during the first half of the season, Kingston would fail to qualify for the ABL's championship season for this season. Not only that, but this would also be the final season where Naismith Basketball Hall of Famer Pop Morgenweck would ever get to coach basketball professionally as well as own the Colonials team, as he would retire from the sport altogether following the season's conclusion due to his old age, with Dave Bass being a player-coach for the rest of the season after Morgenweck had an overall 8–20 record for the season with the Colonials.

== Roster ==
Due to information on American Basketball League players being generally hard to find, there are bound to be more gaps and/or inaccuracies found in certain areas on the team's roster spots than usual.

Player	Position(s)
Dave Bass	F
Jim Brown	G/F
Jack Cramer	Unknown
Moe Dubilier	F
Tiny Hearn	C
Carl Husta	G/F
Rip Kaplinsky	G
Venty Leib	G
Jack McGuirk	F/C
Milt Perkel	G
Mac Posnack	G/F
Phil Rabin	G
Allie Schuckman	G
Corky Stanton	F
Sammy Van Hook	G

Note: In addition to all of these players, there was also an unknown forward with the last name of Lambert that was briefly on the team as well.

== American Basketball League Standings ==
First Half
Team	Wins	Losses	Winning %
Jersey Reds	16	6	.727
New Haven Jewels / New York Jewels^{[a]}	12	8	.600
Brooklyn Visitations	13	10	.565
Philadelphia SPHAs	12	10	.545
New York (Original) Celtics	11	10	.524
Kingston Colonials	5	15	.250
New York Yankees^{[b]}	1	11	.083

Second Half
Team	Wins	Losses	Winning %
New York Jewels^{[a]}	14	5	.737
Jersey Reds	13	7	.650
Philadelphia SPHAs	11	9	.550
Kingston Colonials	9	9	.500
New York (Original) Celtics	7	11	.389
Brooklyn Visitations	2	15	.118

== Awards and honors ==
By the end of the season, Phil Rabin would end up being the leading scorer of the entire league for the second straight season in a row in its fifth season of its return and the eleventh season of its overall existence with a new league record (for the time) of 514 points scored for an average of 13.2 points per game. Rabin would tie his scoring average of 13.2 points per game that he had utilized from the previous season of play, albeit while scoring less points that season with 488 points scored that season against the 514 points he had for this season. Not only that, but he'd also tie Rusty Saunders and Bennie Borgmann as the only other players to lead the league in scoring (either in the original version of it or the revived version of it) for multiple seasons in a row.

== Notes ==
^{a} Before the season began, the Brooklyn Jewels moved from Brooklyn, New York to New Haven, Connecticut to become the New Haven Jewels to start out the season. However, on November 30, 1937, the team moved back from New Haven to Brooklyn to once again return to their original New York Jewels name for the rest of the season.
^{b} The New York Yankees basketball team would drop out of the ABL on January 11, 1938, during the first half of the season.
