= 1935–36 Kingston Colonials season =

- League: American Basketball League (revived original)
- Head coach: Pop Morgenweck
- General manager: Pop Morgenweck
- Owner(s): Pop Morgenweck
- Arena: Kingston Auditorium

Results
- Record: 16–22 (.421)
- Place: Conference: 5th (1st half); 4th (2nd half)
- Playoff finish: Did not qualify

The 1935–36 Kingston Colonials season was the fourteenth professional basketball season played by the Kingston Colonials franchise while competing in the revived version of the American Basketball League. It would also be their first season competing in the revived version of the ABL after previously competing in the Hudson River Basketball League, the New York State Basketball League (multiple times in their tenure), the Interstate Basketball League under a brief period of time, and finally the Metropolitan Basketball League before not being able to compete in a professional basis from 1928 until this season began in 1935. This season saw the ABL work with six teams throughout the entire season, although one of the teams would end up moving around multiple locations throughout the entire season. In any event, the Colonials would showcase themselves as a below-average team throughout the season, with the first half of the season seeing them get a 7–12 record for a fifth place finish that saw them be ahead of only the Paterson Panthers turned Trenton Bengals turned Passaic Red Devils to end that half of the season. The second half of the season would end up seeing relatively similar results occur as well, with Kingston getting a below-average 9–10 record for a fourth place finish to finish ahead of only the Philadelphia SPHAs / Hebrews and the Passaic Red Devils for that half. Due to the less than stellar results at hand from the Colonials, Kingston would fail to compete for the ABL's championship series for this season.

== Roster ==
Due to information on American Basketball League players being generally hard to find, there are bound to be more gaps and/or inaccuracies found in certain areas on the team's roster spots than usual.

Player	Position(s)
Gaza Chizmadia	F/C
Bill Flanigan	G/F
George Glasco	G
Tiny Hearn	C
Carl Husta	G/F
Lefty Kintzing	F
Hank Kurtyka	F/C
Jimmy Lennon	F/C
Ward Meyers	G/F
Jake Pelkington	C/F
Frank Shimek	G/F
Moe Spahn	G/F
Corky Stanton	G/F
Fats Wyka	G/F

== American Basketball League Standings ==
First Half
Team	Wins	Losses	Winning %
Philadelphia SPHAs / Hebrews	14	5	.737
New York Jewels	11	8	.579
Brooklyn Visitations	10	10	.500
Jersey Reds	9	9	.500
Kingston Colonials	7	12	.368
Paterson Panthers / Trenton Bengals^{[a]}	4	11	.267

Second Half
Team	Wins	Losses	Winning %
Brooklyn Visitations	12	8	.600
Jersey Reds	11	9	.550
New York Jewels	10	10	.500
Kingston Colonials	9	10	.474
Philadelphia SPHAs / Hebrews	9	11	.450
Passaic Red Devils^{[a]}	8	11	.421

== Notes ==
^{a} During the first half of the season, after losing all five of the games they played this season, the Paterson Panthers would move from Paterson, New Jersey to nearby Trenton, New Jersey on December 12, 1935 to become the newer version of the Trenton Bengals for the rest of the season. Trenton would finish the first half of the season with a 4–6 record for an overall record of 4–11 between the two teams before the Trenton squad moved out to nearby Passaic, New Jersey on December 30, 1935 to play as the Passaic Red Devils by the time the second half of the season began.
