= 1936–37 Kingston Colonials season =

- League: American Basketball League (revived original)
- Head coach: Pop Morgenweck
- General manager: Pop Morgenweck
- Owner(s): Pop Morgenweck
- Arena: Kingston Auditorium

Results
- Record: 20–17 (.541)
- Place: Conference: 4th (1st half); 5th (2nd half)
- Playoff finish: Did not qualify

The 1936–37 Kingston Colonials season was the fifteenth professional basketball season played by the Kingston Colonials franchise while competing in the revived version of the American Basketball League. It would also be their second season competing in the revived version of the ABL after previously competing in the Hudson River Basketball League, the New York State Basketball League multiple times in their tenure, the Interstate Basketball League under a brief period of time, and finally the Metropolitan Basketball League before not being able to compete in a professional basis from 1928 until 1935. This season saw the ABL technically work with six teams throughout the entire season, although it would showcase a different sixth team operating throughout the second half of the season by comparison toward the first half of the season. In any case, the Colonials would enter this season as an above-average team during the first half of the season with an 11–6 record for a third-place finish to be behind only the Philadelphia SPHAs / Hebrews and the Jersey Reds (who incidentally would eventually become the two teams competing for the league's championship this season). However, when Kingston was competing in the second half of the season, they ended up becoming a below-average team by finishing with a 9–11 record for a fifth-place finish (being ahead of only the Brooklyn Visitations this time around, who had initially started their season out as the Paterson Visitations) instead. Due to the contrasting results at hand from the Colonials, Kingston would fail to compete for the ABL's championship series for this season (which would notably occur due to them failing to win the first half of the season on their ends).

== Roster ==
Due to information on American Basketball League players being generally hard to find, there are bound to be more gaps and/or inaccuracies found in certain areas on the team's roster spots than usual.

Player	Position(s)
Jim Brown	G/F
Tiny Hearn	C
Carl Husta	G/F
Lefty Kintzing	F
Pip Koehler	G/F
Benny Miller	G
Phil Rabin	G
Rusty Saunders	F/C
Corky Stanton	F

== American Basketball League Standings ==
First Half
Team	Wins	Losses	Winning %
Jersey Reds	14	4	.778
Philadelphia SPHAs / Hebrews	12	6	.667
Kingston Colonials	11	6	.647
New York Jewels^{[a]}	7	10	.412
Paterson Visitations / Brooklyn Visitations^{[b]}	4	12	.250
Atlantic City Sandpipers / Sand Snipers^{[c]}	0	10	.000

Second Half
Team	Wins	Losses	Winning %
Philadelphia SPHAs / Hebrews	14	6	.700
Jersey Reds	12	8	.600
Brooklyn Visitations^{[b]}	10	9	.526
New York (Original) Celtics^{[d]}	10	10	.500
Kingston Colonials	9	11	.450
Brooklyn Jewels^{[a]}	4	15	.211

== Awards and honors ==
By the end of the season, Phil Rabin would end up being the leading scorer of the entire league for the fourth season of its return and the tenth season of its overall existence with a new league record (for the time) of 488 points scored for an average of 13.2 points per game. This also marked the first time in the ABL's entire history where someone would average over 10 points per game in the league for an entire season of play.

== Notes ==
^{a} Originally, the New York Jewels played as the New York Jewels for the first half of the season. However, by the start of the second half of the season, the team would rebrand themselves to the Brooklyn Jewels (likely because of the inclusion of the New York (Original) Celtics for the second half of the season following the departure of the Atlantic City Sandpipers / Sand Snipers near the end of the first half of the season) for the rest of that season only going forward.
^{b} The Brooklyn Visitations originally moved from Brooklyn, New York to Paterson, New Jersey to become the Paterson Visitations early on before the first half of the season began. However, by November 23, 1936, the Visitations would decide to move back from Paterson, New Jersey to Brooklyn, New York to become the Brooklyn Visitations once again for the rest of the season going forward.
^{c} After losing all ten of their regular season games in the first half of the season, the Atlantic City Sandpipers / Sand Snipers would drop out of the ABL entirely by December 21, 1936.
^{d} For the second half of the season, the New York (Original) Celtics would return to the ABL by entering the league for that specific half of the season by January 3, 1937, and playing in the ABL for the rest of the season going forward.
