= 1940 World Professional Basketball Tournament =

Basketball tournament in Chicago, Illinois, US

World Professional Basketball Tournament
- 1940

Tournament information
- Location: Chicago, Illinois
- Dates: 18 March–22 March
- Venue: 132nd Infantry Armory
- Teams: 14

Final positions
- Champions: Harlem Globetrotters
- 1st runner-up: Chicago Bruins
- 2nd runner-up: Washington Heurich Brewers
- MVP: Sonny Boswell

The 1940 World Professional Basketball Tournament was the second edition of the World Professional Basketball Tournament. It was held in Chicago, Illinois, during the days of 18–22 March 1940 and featured 14 teams, with the teams mostly being independently run teams (including the Rochester Seagrams, which had roots to the modern-day Sacramento Kings NBA team) which also competed alongside three teams in the National Basketball League and the Washington Heurich Brewers of the American Basketball League. The tournament gained a local interest when the Chicago Bruins of the NBL made it to the championship round after it beat the ABL's Washington Heurich Brewers in the semifinal round, which only gained further interest when the world famous Harlem Globetrotters (who were originally based in Chicago at the time before moving to New York and then Harlem permanently) made it to the championship round over the defending champion New York Renaissance. The second WPBT championship game was won by the world famous Harlem Globetrotters, which defeated the Chicago Bruins 31–29 in the title game. The Washington Heurich Brewers came in third after beating the Syracuse Reds 41–30 in the third-place game. Sonny Boswell of the Harlem Globetrotters was named the tournament's Most Valuable Player.

== Results ==
=== Bracket ===
Round 1
Sheboygan Red Skins	44
Rochester Seagrams	32
Harlem Globetrotters	50
Kenosha Royals	26
New York Renaissance	42
Canton Bulldogs	21
Waterloo Wonders	41
Clarksburg Oil	32
Chicago Bruins	45
Fort Wayne Harvesters	27
Oshkosh All-Stars	42
Brenton Harbor House of David	23

Quarterfinals
Syracuse Reds	39
Sheboygan Red Skins	30
Harlem Globetrotters	37
New York Renaissance	36
Washington Heurich Brewers	35
Waterloo Wonders	21
Chicago Bruins	40
Oshkosh All-Stars	38

Semifinals
Harlem Globetrotters	34
Syracuse Reds	25
Chicago Bruins	46
Washington Heurich Brewers	38

Final
Harlem Globetrotters	31
Chicago Bruins	29
Third place
Syracuse Reds	30
Washington Heurich Brewers	41

=== Third place game ===
22 March 1940

Box score

Washington Heurich Brewers 41, Syracuse Reds 30
Pts: P. Rabin – 16	Pts: M. Haller – 10

132nd Infantry Armory
Referees: Kriznecky, Kraft

=== Championship game ===
22 March 1940

Box score

Harlem Globetrotters 31, Chicago Bruins 29
Scoring by half: 17–13, 14–16
Pts: S. Boswell – 12	Pts: M. Novak – 7

132nd Infantry Armory
Referees: Kennedy, Solodares

== Individual awards ==
- Wibs Kautz of the Chicago Bruins led this tournament in scoring with 57 points scored in four games played.

=== All-Tournament Team ===
- C - Leroy Edwards, Oshkosh All-Stars
- F - Sonny Boswell, Harlem Globetrotters (MVP)
- F - Wibs Kautz, Chicago Bruins
- G - Phil Rabin, Washington Heurich Brewers
- G - Pop Gates, New York Renaissance

== See also ==
- 1939–40 National Basketball League (United States) season, a professional basketball season featuring three of the competing teams there
- 1939–40 Washington Heurich Brewers season, a professional basketball season involving the Washington Heurich Brewers from the revived version of the original American Basketball League
