= Ed Kweller =

American basketball player

Personal information
- Born: January 27, 1915 Pittsburgh, Pennsylvania
- Died: April 1, 2003 (aged 88) Los Angeles, California
- Listed height: 6 ft 6 in (1.98 m)
- Listed weight: 225 lb (102 kg)

Career information
- High school: East Pittsburgh (Pittsburgh, Pennsylvania)
- College: Duquesne (1934–1937)
- Position: Center

Career history
- 1937–1939: Pittsburgh Pirates
- 1938–1939: Washington Heurichs

Edward L. Kweller (January 27, 1915 – April 1, 2003) was an American professional basketball player. He played college basketball for Duquesne University. Kweller then played in the National Basketball League for two years for the Pittsburgh Pirates and averaged 2.6 points per game. In the 1938–39 season, he also played in the American Basketball League for the Washington Heurichs. Kweller later sold furniture for a living and moved to California to retire.
