= Ben Kramer =

American basketball player (1913–1999)

Personal information
- Born: May 14, 1913 Chelsea, Massachusetts, U.S.
- Died: February 3, 1999 (aged 85)
- Listed height: 6 ft 0 in (1.83 m)
- Listed weight: 200 lb (91 kg)

Career information
- College: LIU Brooklyn (1934–1937)
- Position: Forward / guard

Career history

Coaching
- 1944: Baltimore Bullets

Career highlights
- Consensus All-American (1936); Haggerty Award (1937)

Ben "Red" Kramer (May 14, 1913 – February 3, 1999) was an American standout basketball player for Long Island University (LIU) during the 1930s, a time in which LIU was a national power. Kramer played for Hall of Fame coach Clair Bee from 1933–34 to 1936–37, and in his four seasons the team finished with records of 26–1, 24–2, 26–0, and 29–3, respectively. At one point Long Island had a 43-game win streak, which was snapped by Stanford and their star player Hank Luisetti.

== College ==
Kramer, a 6 ft 0 in (1.83 m), 200 lb. (91 kg) forward/guard, helped Long Island gain respect both in the New York City metropolitan area as well as in the national scene. Most schools during this era did not allow freshmen to play varsity sports in college—although there was no set rule against it—but Clair Bee did, which allowed Kramer and LIU to remain dominant. In 1935–36, the Blackbirds finished undefeated at 26–0 and were named mythical "Eastern champions" since neither the National Invitation Tournament (NIT) nor the NCAA Tournament existed yet. The following season, Kramer's last in college, he was named the Haggerty Award winner which is given annually to the best men's basketball player in the New York City metropolitan area. At the time, it was the second year in the award's existence, and teammate Jules Bender had won it the year before.

== Professional ==
After college, Kramer played in the first major professional basketball league, the American Basketball League. In 1938–39 he played for the Kingston Colonials, then spent the next three seasons with the Washington Heurich Brewers. Kramer was the league's fifth-leading scorer all three of those seasons while averaging 4.2 points per game. After his time with the Brewers, he played five more seasons of professional basketball. In 1945–46, his best season, he played for the Wilmington Bombers and appeared in 15 games. The Bombers finished third in the league with a 14–14 record but lost in the playoffs. Kramer's final season came in 1946–47 while playing for the Troy Celtics, although he appeared in only three games.
