= Baltimore Coliseum =

Building in Maryland, US

- Interactive map of Baltimore Coliseum
- Address: 2201 N Monroe St
- Location: Baltimore, Maryland
- Coordinates: 39°18′48″N 76°38′52″W
- Owner: William Rothman (& others)
- Capacity: 4,500

Construction
- Built: 1938-39
- Opened: 1939
- Closed: 1968
- Demolished: 2008

Tenants
- Baltimore Clippers (ABL) (1939–1941); Baltimore Bullets (ABL/BAA/NBA) (1944–1954)

Baltimore Coliseum was an indoor arena in Baltimore, Maryland. It previously hosted two ABL teams in the Baltimore Clippers from 1939 until 1941 and the NBA's original Baltimore Bullets from 1944 (back when they played in the ABL) until 1954. Prior to that, it originally hosted roller skating events.

The Coliseum was built in 1938 on the corner of Monroe Street and Windsor Avenue near the Pennsylvania Avenue entertainment area and held 4,500 people. As a professional sports venue, it had been superseded by the Baltimore Civic Center in 1961, which prompted the Coliseum's closure not long after. According to former Baltimore Bullets team owner Robert "Jake" Embry, when the Coliseum stopped being used for sporting matches, the venue would end up being used as a garage instead. The building, after over four decades of disuse, was demolished in July 2008. The Center for Urban Families (CFUF) now stands on the site.
