= Jules Bender =

American basketball player (1914–1982)

Personal information
- Born: April 2, 1914
- Died: January 13, 1982 (aged 67–68) Boca Raton, Florida, U.S.
- Listed height: 5 ft 11 in (1.80 m)
- Listed weight: 160 lb (73 kg)

Career information
- High school: Boys (Brooklyn, New York)
- College: LIU Brooklyn (1934–1937)
- Position: Forward / guard

Career highlights
- Consensus All-American (1937); Haggerty Award (1936)

Jules Bender (April 2, 1914 – January 13, 1982) was an American collegiate and professional basketball player. He was an All-American at Long Island University, leading the Blackbirds to a 103–6 record over his career.

Bender was a native of Brooklyn, New York, and attended Boys High School. He went on to play college basketball at Long Island University from 1934 to 1937.

== College ==
Bender came to L.I.U. to play for future Hall of Fame coach Clair Bee. During Bender's four-year career, the Blackbirds went a remarkable 103–6, including a perfect 24–0 in the 1935–36 season, with Bender leading the New York City metropolitan area in scoring, a feat he also accomplished the previous season. At the completion of the 1936 season, Bender was named the winner of the inaugural Haggerty Award, presented since to the top player in the New York City metropolitan area each year.

After the 1936 season, the L.I.U. Blackbirds were invited to try out for the 1936 Olympics, the first year in which basketball would be an event. In a move that surprised many, the largely Jewish team, including Bender, boycotted the trials over the games' placement in Berlin, Germany and the anti-semitic leanings of the country's leader Adolf Hitler.

Bender was named a Consensus All-American in 1937. He was inducted into the L.I.U. Athletics Hall of Fame in 2000 (their inaugural class).

== Professional ==
After his college career, Bender played in the American Basketball League for Kate Smith's Celtics, the Kingston Colonials, Wilkes-Barre Barons, Baltimore Clippers and the Paterson Crescents. Following his professional career he became a high school teacher at his alma mater, Boys High School and then at John Dewey High School, both in Brooklyn. He also coached at the college level for Brooklyn College and the United States Merchant Marine Academy.

Bender died of cancer on January 13, 1982. He was buried at Mount Hebron Cemetery in Flushing, Queens.
