= Chick Reiser =

American basketball player-coach

Personal information
- Born: December 17, 1914 New York City, New York, U.S.
- Died: July 29, 1996 (aged 81) Destin, Florida, U.S.
- Listed height: 5 ft 11 in (1.80 m)
- Listed weight: 165 lb (75 kg)

Career information
- High school: Stuyvesant (New York City, New York)
- College: NYU (1932–1933); Pratt (1933–1935)
- BAA draft: 1947: 9th round, 75th overall pick
- Drafted by: Baltimore Bullets
- Playing career: 1938–1950
- Position: Shooting guard / small forward
- Number: 27, 3, 29
- Coaching career: 1951–1952

Career history

Playing
- 1938–1939: Kingston Colonials
- 1939–1940: Troy Celtics
- 1940–1941: Brooklyn Celtics
- 1941–1942: Wilmington Blue Bombers
- 1942–1943: Brooklyn Indians
- 1943–1947: Fort Wayne Zollner Pistons
- 1947–1949: Baltimore Bullets
- 1949–1950: Washington Capitols

Coaching
- 1951–1952: Washington Capitols
- 1952 (two seasons): Baltimore Bullets

Career highlights
- BAA champion (1948); 2× NBL champion (1944, 1945)

Career BAA and NBA playing statistics
- Points: 1,773 (10.4 ppg)
- Assists: 346 (2.0 apg)
- Stats at NBA.com
- Stats at Basketball Reference

Career coaching record
- NBA: 8–22 (.267)
- Record at Basketball Reference

Joseph Francis "Chick" Reiser (December 17, 1914 – July 29, 1996) was an American professional basketball player and coach.

Reiser played college basketball for the NYU Violets and the Pratt Cannoneers. He played professionally in several leagues, including the National Basketball League (NBL), Basketball Association of America (BAA), and National Basketball Association (NBA). Reiser was a member of teams such as the Fort Wayne Zollner Pistons, the Baltimore Bullets, and the Washington Capitols.

From 1951 to 1952, Reiser served as the head coach of the Washington Capitols, compiling an 15–7 record in their only season of play at the American Basketball League before they were forced to fold operations for good on January 11, 1952 after previously folding operations in the 1950–51 NBA season. He then coached the Baltimore Bullets for two seasons after the Capitols folded operations, though he compiled an 8–22 during his time there before he was fired by the Bullets on November 12, 1952.

== BAA/NBA career statistics ==
Legend
GP	Games played	GS	Games started	MPG	Minutes per game
FG%	Field goal percentage	3P%	3-point field goal percentage	FT%	Free throw percentage
RPG	Rebounds per game	APG	Assists per game	SPG	Steals per game
BPG	Blocks per game	PPG	Points per game	**Bold**	Career high
†	Won an NBA championship

=== Regular season ===
Year	Team	GP	FG%	FT%	APG	PPG
1947–48†	Baltimore	47	.322	.741	.9	**11.5**
1948–49	Baltimore	57	**.335**	.732	2.3	11.0
1949–50	Washington	**67**	.305	**.835**	**2.6**	9.0
Career		171	.321	.772	2.0	10.4

=== Playoffs ===
Year	Team	GP	FG%	FT%	APG	PPG
1948†	Baltimore	**11**	**.259**	.738	.6	9.4
1949	Baltimore	3	.240	**.900**	**2.7**	10.0
1950	Washington	2	**.259**	.818	2.5	**11.5**
Career		16	.257	.795	1.3	9.8

== Head coaching record ==
Team	Year	G	W	L	W–L%	Finish	PG	PW	PL	PW–L%	Result
Baltimore	1951–52	27	8	19	.296	5th in Eastern	—	—	—	—	Missed playoffs
Baltimore	1952–53	3	0	3	.000		—	—	—	—	
Career		30	8	22	.267		0	0	0	–	
