= Bernie Fliegel =

American basketball player (1918–2009)

- Fliegel (left) with head coach Nat Holman

Personal information
- Born: May 13, 1918 New York City, New York, U.S.
- Died: December 3, 2009 (aged 91) Naples, Florida, U.S.
- Listed height: 6 ft 3 in (1.91 m)
- Listed weight: 205 lb (93 kg)

Career information
- High school: DeWitt Clinton (Bronx, New York)
- College: CCNY (1935–1938)
- Position: Guard / forward / center
- Number: 3

Career highlights
- ABL champion (1942); First-team All-American – NEA (1938); Haggerty Award (1938)

Bernard Fliegel (May 13, 1918 – December 3, 2009) was an American standout basketball player for the City College of New York (CCNY) during the late 1930s, and later, a professional in the American Basketball League. As a senior in 1937–38, he received the Haggerty Award, given to the best men's basketball player in the New York City metropolitan area, and remains the only winner from CCNY in the award's long history.

== Early life ==
Fliegel was born in New York City on May 13, 1918. His parents were both Jewish immigrants; his mother, Rose Fliegel (née Grossman), born in Odessa was Russian and his father, Meyer Fliegel, was Lithuanian. At age 12, his family moved to the Bronx from Manhattan on account of his father's illness and retirement.

In high school, Fliegel began playing basketball at DeWitt Clinton High School. He grew to be 6 ft 3 in (1.91 m) tall and became known for his basketball abilities. He led DeWitt to the Public Schools Athletic League (PSAL) championship over powerhouse Thomas Jefferson High School of Brooklyn as a senior in 1933–34. Fliegel, a center, was named to the all-city third team despite rarely even shooting the basketball. He then graduated in 1934, at age 16, and enrolled at the City College of New York.

== College career ==
Fliegel played basketball for the Beavers all four years he attended. His freshman year, however, was spent on the junior varsity squad, but when he became a sophomore Fliegel suited up for Nat Holman's varsity team.

Midway through his sophomore season, Fliegel became a regular starter. Although he had played the center position in high school, Holman also used him as a guard and forward. The Beavers finished 10–4 in his first year on varsity, including a close four-point loss to the defending national champions, New York University. The following year, he accounted for approximately one-fifth of CCNY's total scoring (119 out of 596 points) en route to a 10–6 record. That season, Basketball Hall of Fame coach Clair Bee said that Fliegel was "...the best player in the city. He can do it all."

Fliegel's senior season in 1937–38 was one filled with awards, records and accolades. He was the only player on CCNY over 6 ft 0 in (1.83 m) tall, so he routinely played taller players than himself. In a game against All-American Hank Luisetti and the Stanford Cardinal (who had three players taller than Fliegel) at Madison Square Garden, he almost led a stunning comeback after being down by 16 points in the second half before falling, 45–42. Despite the frequent height disadvantage, he still led all of New York City's college players with 12.8 points per game. He scored 205 points in 16 games, which was a school record for 12 years, and the Beavers went 13–3 on the year. Fliegel was the only player named as a consensus First Team All-Metropolitan selection, and he received the Haggerty Award as the area's top college player. Newspaper Enterprise Association (NEA) also named him a First Team All-American.

== Professional and later life ==
After graduating at age 19, Fliegel enrolled in the Fordham University School of Law. He also began playing professionally in the American Basketball League (ABL) for Kate Smith's Celtics, but the team moved shortly thereafter and became known as the Kingston Colonials. The Colonials won the regular season championship but were upset by the Jersey Reds in the playoffs.

The next season (1939–40), Fliegel's team was eliminated in the playoffs once again after finishing 19–15. Fliegel stayed with the franchise despite it being relocated once again in 1940–41. The Brooklyn Celtics, as they became known, played well in the regular season with Fliegel as their third-leading scorer. They lost to the Philadelphia Sphas, however, in the championship series. In the spring of 1941, Fliegel graduated from law school.

For the rest of his professional career, which was interrupted for three years due to his enlistment in the U.S. Army for World War II, he played for either the Wilmington Bombers or Jersey City Atoms. He finished his ABL career in 1947 having scored 911 points in 151 games (6.0 average). Fliegel was offered to play for the New York Knicks in the newly developed Basketball Association of America (which became the modern NBA), but his desire to practice law made him refuse the invitation. Playing in the BAA would have been a full-time job, so Fliegel decided to become a lawyer as his profession.

He moved to Naples, Florida in 1972 with his wife where he died on December 3, 2009. He has been inducted in the New York City and CCNY Halls of Fame.
