= Pop Morgenweck =

American basketball player, coach and team owner

Personal information
- Born: July 15, 1875 Egg Harbor City, New Jersey, U.S.
- Died: December 8, 1941 (aged 66) Egg Harbor City, New Jersey, U.S.
- Listed height: 5 ft 8 in (1.73 m)
- Listed weight: 165 lb (75 kg)

Career history

Playing
- 1901–1902: Philadelphia Phillies
- 1903–1904: Haverhill
- 1903–1904: Westfield Whirlwinds
- 1910–1914: Kingston Colonials
- 1911–1912: Pittsburgh South Siders
- 1914–1915: Cohoes Cohosiers
- 1915–1916: Kingston / Elizabeth / North Hudson Colonials

Coaching
- 1902–1903: Philadelphia Phillies
- 1902–1903: Wilmington Peaches
- 1903–1904: Westfield Whirlwinds
- 1903–1904: Camden Electrics
- 1910–1914: Kingston Colonials
- 1911–1912: Pittsburgh South Siders
- 1913–1914: Newark Palatials
- 1914–1915: Cohoes Cohosiers
- 1915–1916: Kingston / Elizabeth / North Hudson Colonials
- 1916–1917: Paterson Crescents
- 1919–1920: Passaic City Athletic Association
- 1921–1922: Kingston Colonials
- 1922–1927: Paterson Legionnaires
- 1923–1924: Amsterdam Flashes
- 1923–1925: Kingston Colonials
- 1924–1925: Passaic Panthers
- 1925–1926: Passaic Mets
- 1925–1926: Perth Amboy Mets
- 1927–1928: Kingston Colonials
- 1927–1928: Fort Wayne Hoosiers
- 1928–1929: Paterson Whirlwinds
- 1929–1930: Rochester Centrals
- 1930–1931: Chicago Bruins
- 1931–1933: Bridgeton Gems
- 1932–1933: Paterson Continentals
- 1933–1934: Camden Athletics
- 1935–1938: Kingston Colonials

Career highlights
- As player: Hudson River League champion (1912); As coach: NL champion (1904); 2× Hudson River League champion (1912, 1925); Inter-State League champion (1917); New York State champion (1923); 2× Metropolitan League champion (1923, 1928)
- Basketball Hall of Fame

Frank W. "Pop" Morgenweck (July 15, 1875 – December 8, 1941) was an American basketball player, coach, and team owner. He began his career in the National League in 1901, and won that league's championship with the Camden Electrics in 1904. After retiring in 1916, he became a coach and an owner of professional teams, operating teams in ten different leagues and in more than 18 cities. As a coach, he won the Metropolitan League title with Paterson Legionnaires in 1923 and Kingston Colonials in 1928. He retired as a coach in 1938 with over 500 career victories. He was enshrined into the Naismith Memorial Basketball Hall of Fame as a contributor in 1962.
