= Barney Sedran =

American basketball player (1891–1969)

Personal information
- Full name: Barney Sedran (Sedransky)
- Nickname: Mighty Mite
- Born: January 28, 1891 New York, New York, U.S.
- Died: January 14, 1969 (aged 77)
- Height: 5 ft 4 in (1.63 m)
- Weight: 115 lb (52 kg)

Sport
- Country: United States
- Sport: Basketball
- Team: Various (see article)
- Turned pro: 1911

Barney Sedran (born Sedransky; nicknamed "Mighty Mite"; January 28, 1891 – January 14, 1969) was an American basketball player in the 1910s and 1920s who is in the Basketball Hall of Fame.

== Career ==
Nicknamed "Mighty Mite", the New York City native was Jewish and grew up on the Lower East Side. Sedran (shortened from Sedransky) was a member of the well-known New York Whirlwinds and Cleveland Rosenblums, among many other teams in New York as well as in Carbondale, Pennsylvania.

Sedran played for the Lower East Side's University Settlement House because he was too small to make his DeWitt Clinton High School (Bronx, New York) team. The Settlement team won the 115-pound division championship in 1905–06, and the Metropolitan AAU title 1906–07.

At City College of New York(CCNY) Sedran was the school's leading scorer for three consecutive seasons, 1909–11, and was named to various college all-star teams.

The smallest player enshrined in the Naismith Memorial Basketball Hall of Fame, “The Mighty Might of Basketball” turned pro after leaving CCNY, teaming successfully and often with 5’ 7” hall of famer (Naismith and IJSHOF) Max Friedman. They were known as the “Heavenly Twins”. In an era of barnstorming, short-lived leagues, and schedules that often called for as many as three games a day, Sedran is said to have been pro basketball's highest paid star.

His many teams of record include: Newburgh Tenths 1911–12 (Hudson Valley League), Utica Utes/Indians 1912–14 (New York State), Carbondale Pioneers 1914–18 (Pennsylvania), Brooklyn Trolley Dodgers 1915–16 (Interstate), Kensington Jaspers 1915–17 (Pennsylvania), Jersey City Skeeters 1917–18 (Central), Scranton Miners 1918–19 (Pennsylvania), Albany Senators 1919-20/1921-24 (New York), Passaic Athletic Association 1919–20 (Interstate), Turners Falls Athletics 1919–20 (Interstate), New York Whirlwinds 1919–21 (Eastern), Bridgeport Blue Ribbons 1920–21 (Central), Trenton Tigers 1920–21 (Eastern), Easthampton Hampers 1920–22 (Interstate), Mohawk Indians 1921–2) (New York), Cohoes Cohosiers 1921–22 (New York), New York Giants 1921–22 (Eastern), Brooklyn Dodgers 1921–23 (Metropolitan), Philadelphia DeNeri 1922–23 (Eastern), Yonkers Chippewas 1923–24 (Metropolitan), Cleveland Rosenblums 1924–26 (American Basketball League), Brooklyn Jewels 1932–36 (Metropolitan), New York Whirlwinds 1936–38 (Metropolitan).

Among Sedran's court highlights: He led Newburgh in 1912, Utica 1913–15, Carbondale, PA in 1917, Easthampton 1920–21, and Albany in 1921 to League championships. After his Utica club won the 1913–14 New York State League title, the Utes defeated Trenton, champions of the Eastern League, to claim the World Professional Championship. Sedran once scored 34 points on a court without backboards; another time, 34 points shooting at rims without a net. He averaged 7.3 points per game during his career, with a single season high 13.2 ppg in 1917.

As a pro coach, Sedran was player-coach of the Passaic Athletic Association (1919–20) in the Interstate League, and coach of the following American Basketball League (ABL) teams: Kingston Colonials (1938–40), Kate Smith Celtics (1938–40), Troy Celtics (1939–41), Wilmington Blue Bombers (1941–45), and New York Gothams (1945–46). The Kate Smith Celtics won 1939 and 1940 ABL championships. Wilmington won ABL titles 1941–42 and 1943–44. In 1946-47 he coached the Albany Senators of the New York State Professional League. ((NOTE: Depending upon the league, basketball seasons often lap over from one year to another. Other times a season begins and ends in the same calendar year.)

Sedran's New York Whirlwind team of 1919–21 is considered by many to have been the greatest professional basketball team of the first half of the 20th century.

Fellow Jewish Hall of Famer Nat Holman, considered by many experts to be the greatest player of the 1920s, said,

Barney Sedran, in my humble opinion, was the greatest little man who ever played the game. He could do everything. A great outside and inside shooter, smart passer, great ball handler, and very fast. He was always in motion, setting up play situations which resulted in baskets. He used his mind at all times and for a little man withstood the punishment that was characteristic of the rough and tumble contact game of the pros in the early days of the sport. He could do everything. He was the most complete player of his time. He was afraid of none and dared all.

== Halls of Fame ==
In 1962, the 5 ft 4 in (1.63 m) Sedran was enshrined to the Naismith Memorial Basketball Hall of Fame as a player, becoming the smallest player to ever achieve this.

He was inducted posthumously into the International Jewish Sports Hall of Fame in 1989.

His story is featured in The First Basket, the first and most comprehensive documentary on the history of Jews and basketball.

== See also ==
- List of select Jewish basketball players
