= Samuel Kaplan =

American basketball player, accountant and politician

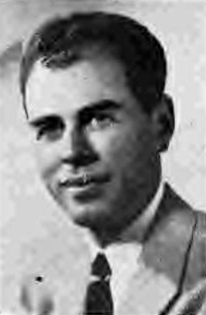
- Kaplan c. 1946

Member of the New York State Assembly from the 24th Kings district
- In office January 1, 1947 – December 31, 1948
- Preceded by: Philip Blank
- Succeeded by: Ben Werbel

Personal details
- Born: December 22, 1912 New York City, U.S.
- Died: July 1, 1998 (aged 85) Kendall, Florida, U.S.
- Party: American Labor
- Education: City College of New York

Military service
- Allegiance: United States
- Branch/service: United States Army
- Years of service: 1942–1945
- Unit: 57th Signal Battalion
- Battles/wars: World War II; North African campaign; Italian campaign; Battle of Anzio

Samuel Kaplan (December 22, 1912 – July 1, 1998) was an American basketball player, accountant and politician who served as a member of the New York State Assembly from 1947 to 1948. He and Kenneth Sherbell were the only two independent American Laborites elected to the state legislature in 1946.

Kaplan was a delegate to the 1948 Progressive National Convention.

Kaplan died on July 1, 1998, in Kendall, Florida.

== Sources ==
New York State Assembly
Preceded by Philip Blank	New York State Assembly; Kings County, 24th District; 1947–1948	Succeeded by Ben Werbel
