= Brooklyn Celtics =

American basketball team based in Brooklyn, NY

The Brooklyn Celtics were an American basketball team based in Brooklyn, New York, that was a member of the American Basketball League.

During the first half of the 1940/41 season, the Troy Celtics moved to Brooklyn to become the Brooklyn Celtics.

== History ==
Originally established as the Troy Haymakers in 1938, the team was based in Troy, New York. In December 1939, the Haymakers absorbed the Kingston Colonials and subsequently rebranded as the Troy Celtics. During the first half of the 1940–41 ABL season, the franchise relocated to Brooklyn, adopting the name Brooklyn Celtics. This move was part of a broader trend of team relocations and rebrandings within the ABL during that era.

Under the guidance of head coach Barney Sedran, the Brooklyn Celtics experienced a notable turnaround. After a challenging first half of the season, the team improved significantly in the second half, finishing with an 11–4 record and securing first place. They advanced to the ABL Championship Finals but were ultimately defeated by the Philadelphia Sphas.

== Legacy ==
The Brooklyn Celtics' brief existence reflects the fluid nature of professional basketball teams during the early 20th century, characterized by frequent relocations and organizational changes. While the team had a short tenure, its evolution from the Troy Haymakers to the Brooklyn Celtics illustrates the dynamic landscape of early professional basketball leagues in the United States.

== Year-by-year ==
Year	League	Reg. season	Playoffs
1940/41	ABL	4th (1st half); 1st (2nd half)	Final
