= Baltimore Clippers (basketball) =

The Baltimore Clippers were an American basketball team based in Baltimore, Maryland, which played in the American Basketball League.

== History ==
The Baltimore Clippers were owned and managed by Henry Dopkin. They played out of the Baltimore Coliseum.

=== 1939–1940 season ===
They played their first game on November 10, 1939, losing to the New York Jewels. Members of the first team included Bobby McDermott.

== Year-by-year ==
Year	League	Reg. season	Playoffs
1939/40	ABL	5th	5th in Round Robin
1940/41	ABL	5th (1st half); 5th (2nd half)	Did not qualify
