= Troy Celtics =

American basketball team

The Troy Haymakers were an American basketball team based in Troy, New York, which was a member of the American Basketball League.

Supposedly, the Troy Haymakers temporarily rebranded themselves into the Troy Celtics as a homage of sorts to the Original Celtics franchise for participating in the 1939 World Professional Basketball Tournament, with the World Professional Basketball Tournament later becoming a yearly event throughout the next decade afterward (minus Troy's participation from each subsequent event), though the Troy franchise would later return to their Haymakers name for at least the early portion of the 1939–40 season following their failed stint in the 1939 WPBT if they did participate in it as the Troy Celtics. After its first season the team was rebranded as the Troy Celtics. During the early (first) half of the 1939–40 ABL season, the Troy Haymakers team absorbed the Kingston Colonials franchise (who had appeared to be the better team on the surface that season, but were struggling financially and were looking to get out of the ABL themselves pretty soon on their ends) on December 19, 1939, which led to the merged franchises rebranding themselves into the Troy Celtics for the rest of the season (and later, essentially being referred to as the Celtics for the rest of their existence going forward). During the first half of the 1940–41 season, due to the team having issues with finding a proper home venue to play home games for that season due to the Troy State Armory being used by the U.S. military in preparation for World War II, the Celtics eventually moved to the nearby city of Brooklyn whereupon they became the Brooklyn Celtics for the rest of that season going forward. Following their brief move to Brooklyn, the Celtics would end up leaving the ABL due in part to World War II heating up for the U.S.A. alongside home court and financial issues on their ends. However, after eventually finding new ownership following the conclusion of World War II, the Troy Celtics would have one more try at finding success in the ABL, which was contrastingly bigger in scope, yet smaller in execution by the time they returned to form. Following their final failed season in the ABL, the Troy Celtics would briefly have a final brief season played in the New York State Basketball League for the 1948–49 season, playing in four games for a 2–2 record before leaving the league on December 12, 1948.

== Year-by-year ==
Year	League	Reg. season	Playoffs
1938/39	ABL	6th	Did not qualify
1939/40	ABL	3rd	2nd in Round Robin
1940/41	ABL	n/a	n/a

Year	League	Reg. season	Playoffs
1946/47	ABL	3rd, Northern	Did not qualify
