= Washington Brewers =

- Arena: Heurich Gym (1938–40); Riverside Stadium (1940–41); Turner's Arena (1941–42)
- Capacity: Heurich Gym (1500); Riverside Stadium (7000); Turner’s Arena (2000)
- Location: Washington, D.C.
- Head coaches: Bob McDonald; Elmer Ripley; Joe Dreyfus; Mac Posnack
- Championships: 0

The Washington Brewers were an American professional basketball team based in Washington, D.C. that competed in the American Basketball League from 1938 to 1941. The team played its home games at Heurich Gym during the 1938/39 and 1939/40 seasons, at Riverside Stadium during the 1940/41 season and at Turner's Arena during the 1941/42 season.

Bob McDonald, Elmer Ripley and Joe Dreyfus coached the team during the 1938/39 season. Mac Posnack coached for the following three. The team had a franchise record of 50-63 (.442 pct) and never won a championship.

Originally, the team was known as the Washington Heurichs. During the 1939/40 season, the team was known as the Washington Heurich Brewers and before the 1940/41 season the team became simply the Washington Brewers.

== Year-by-year ==
Year	League	Reg. season	Playoffs
1938/39	ABL	8th	Did not qualify
1939/40	ABL	2nd	4th in Round Robin
1940/41	ABL	2nd (1st half); 3rd (2nd half)	Did not qualify
1941/42	ABL	3rd (1st half); 4th (2nd half)	No playoff
