= Kingston Colonials =

American basketball team

The Kingston Colonials were an American basketball team, based in Kingston, New Jersey, that was a member of Hudson River Basketball League, the New York State Basketball League, the Interstate Basketball League, the Metropolitan Basketball League, and the American Basketball League. The team merged with the Troy Haymakers in the middle of the 1939/40 season to form the Troy Celtics.

== History ==
=== Hudson River Basketball League ===
The Colonials were playing in 1910 in the second of two seasons of the Hudson River League where they were beaten by the Troy Trojans.

=== New York State Basketball League ===
In 1911-12, the Colonials played in the Catskills League. After the league folded in 1912, the team joined the New York State League where they played until 1914-1915.

=== Interstate Basketball League ===
For the 1915-16 season, the Colonials would end up playing for the Interstate Basketball League, where they would qualify for the inaugural championship series against the Paterson Crescents. Kingston would end up losing that series 3-2 to Paterson.

=== Return to the New York State Basketball League ===
From 1921-23, the Colonials returned to the New York State League. In 1923, the team included George 'Babe' Artus, Benny Borgmann, Nick Harvey, Carl and Mickey Husta, and Charles Powers, with Frank "Pop" Morgenweck as manager/coach. That year, the team beat the Original Celtics in 2 out of 3 games to win the World Basketball Championships.

=== Metropolitan Basketball League ===
In 1924-25, the team played in the Metropolitan Basketball League. On 10 March, the all-white Colonials played an interracial matchup against the black Renaissance Big Five ("Rens"). Renaissance were up 24-14 at half, but the Colonials made a comeback before losing to Renaissance 39-31.

In 1927, the team included Fritz Knothe and Morgenweck's son Frank Jr was Assistant Manager.

The Colonials won the Metropolitan League title in 1928.

=== American Basketball League ===
From 1935 to 1940, the team played in the American Basketball League from 1935–36. In 1936-37, the Colonials finished the season 20-17 and did not make the playoffs. In 1938-39, the Colonials finished the season in 1st place with a win-loss record of 28-7. However, they faced, and loss to, the 3rd place Jersey Reds in the playoffs, who were themselves beaten by the New York Jewels.

During the 1939/40 season, the team was merged with the Troy Haymakers to form the Troy Celtics on December 19, 1939. The team had an 8-4 win-loss record before the merger with Phil Rabin led the league in scoring.

== Year-by-year ==
Year	League	Reg. season	Record	Playoffs
1935/36	ABL	5th (1st half); 4th (2nd half)	16-22	Did not qualify
1936/37	ABL	3rd (1st half); 5th (2nd half)	20-17	Did not qualify
1937/38	ABL	6th (1st half); 4th (2nd half)	14-24	Did not qualify
1938/39	ABL	1st	28-7	Lost ABL Semifinals
1939/40	ABL	6th*	8-4	Did not qualify
