= 1943–44 Wilmington Bombers season =

- League champions
- League: American Basketball League (revived original)
- Head coach: Barney Sedran
- General manager: Barney Sedran
- Owner(s): Barney Sedran(?)
- Arena: State Armory

Results
- Record: 17–9 (.654)
- Place: Conference: 1st (1st half); 3rd (2nd half)
- Playoff finish: ABL Champions (Won 4–3 over Philadelphia SPHAs)

The 1943–44 Wilmington Bombers season was the third season played by this franchise (though they might have existed longer than that through a connection with the Brooklyn Celtics) and its first under the Wilmington Bombers name (with some media outlets still referring to them as the Blue Bombers even during the season). The franchise had previously played as the Wilmington Blue Bombers during the 1941–42 season before relocating during the 1942–43 season, when they first played as the Camden Indians before becoming the Brooklyn Indians. The franchise returned to Wilmington, Delaware for the 1943–44 season after the city provided the use of its State Armory as a home venue for their ABL team again when they originally limited its usage for the U.S. military during the height of World War II. While this team would retain head coach Barney Sedran following his season with the Camden / Brooklyn Indians, the Bombers would operate under mostly new ownership with a mostly new roster competing under their name against what they had in their inaugural season as the Blue Bombers (with veteran guard Moe Frankel, guard Charlie Hoefer, and center Ed Sadowski being the only players reacquired by this team). Despite them operating closer to an expansion franchise than a returning franchise with consistency in mind, Wilmington would win their second ABL championship in three seasons by winning the ABL championship series 4–3 over the Philadelphia SPHAs.

== Season Overview ==
Similar to Wilmington's first season played in the 1941–42 season, this season would once again see the ABL operate under a split season format, though it would be the last season in the league's history that would use said format as a whole. Not only that, but the 1943–44 season was also notable for the ABL's competition and cooperation with the National Basketball League (NBL) during World War II that had first started in the previous season of competition. While the ABL and NBL still operated as rivaling professional basketball leagues for its time, the two leagues would once again agree to prohibit the transfer of players between them without compensation, which was an arrangement intended to address the effects of players leaving professional basketball for military service (though this agreement would exclude the minor Connecticut State Basketball League, which folded operations the previous season). The ABL also returned to using a longer regular season schedule after the travel restrictions that had limited the number of games played during the previous season were eased up throughout the nation.

The ABL began the season with more teams than the NBL for the second consecutive season, though its membership was reduced to four teams after the Brooklyn Indians left the league on January 4, 1944; the former Indians subsequently continued playing as the Brooklyn Eagles for the rest of their season and later appeared in the 1944 World Professional Basketball Tournament. Wilmington finished the first half of the season with a 12–4 record, placing first in the entire league, but finished the second half with an average 5–5 record in third place behind the Trenton Tigers and Philadelphia SPHAs. Under the league's split season format, the winners of each half-season qualified for the ABL's best-of-seven championship series. Therefore, despite the Trenton Tigers having the second-best overall record for the season, Wilmington advanced to the championship series by having the best record for the first half of the season, while the defending champion Philadelphia SPHAs qualified by winning the second half of the season. After taking the opening game on the road, the Bombers fell behind 3–1 in the championship series. However, Wilmington then won the next three games in convincing fashion to defeat the SPHAs 4–3 and win the ABL championship, which would be the second straight championship won by Wilmington in terms of seasons that the team actually played in Wilmington, Delaware properly, regardless of whether the Blue color is added to the Bombers name or not.

== Roster ==
Due to information on American Basketball League players being generally hard to find, there are bound to be more gaps and/or inaccuracies found in certain areas on the team's roster spots than usual.

1943–44 Wilmington (Blue) Bombers roster
Players

Pos.	No.	Player	Height	Weight	DOB	From
G/F		Jake Ahearn	6 ft 3 in (1.91 m)	190 lb (86 kg)	1918-01-06	St. John's
G/F		Ben Auerbach	6 ft 1 in (1.85 m)	190 lb (86 kg)	1919-03-01	NYU
F/C		Eddie Boyle	6 ft 3 in (1.91 m)	180 lb (82 kg)	1917-06-15	Temple
G/F		Paul Chadick	5 ft 11 in (1.80 m)	175 lb (79 kg)	1918-05-25	Saint Joseph's
F		Dan Christie	6 ft 2 in (1.88 m)	200 lb (91 kg)	1920-11-19	Manhattan
C		Bobby Dorn	6 ft 5 in (1.96 m)	200 lb (91 kg)	1920-06-21	Temple
F/C		Bob Fitzgerald	6 ft 5 in (1.96 m)	190 lb (86 kg)	1923-03-14	Seton Hall
G/F		Moe Frankel	5 ft 10 in (1.78 m)	190 lb (86 kg)	1913-01-25	No college
F		Ben Goldfaden	6 ft 1 in (1.85 m)	185 lb (84 kg)	1913-09-06	George Washington
F/C		Charley Harris	6 ft 7 in (2.01 m)	210 lb (95 kg)	Unknown	No college
G		Charlie Hoefer	5 ft 9 in (1.75 m)	158 lb (72 kg)	1921-09-16	Queens College
F/C		Steve Juenger	6 ft 3 in (1.91 m)	195 lb (88 kg)	1915-02-10	Temple
F		Ben Kramer	6 ft 1 in (1.85 m)	195 lb (88 kg)	1913-05-03	Long Island
G/F		Bill McCahan	5 ft 11 in (1.80 m)	200 lb (91 kg)	1921-06-07	Duke
F/C		Roger Michaels	6 ft 4 in (1.93 m)	190 lb (86 kg)	Unknown	No college
F/C		Sam Milanovich	6 ft 4 in (1.93 m)	190 lb (86 kg)	1918-09-21	Pittsburgh
G		Angelo Musi	5 ft 9 in (1.75 m)	145 lb (66 kg)	1918-07-25	Temple
G/F		Porky Rosenthal	6 ft 1 in (1.85 m)	180 lb (82 kg)	1917-10-22	No college
C		Ed Sadowski	6 ft 5 in (1.96 m)	240 lb (109 kg)	1917-07-11	Seton Hall
G/F		Johnny Salata	6 ft 0 in (1.83 m)	200 lb (91 kg)	1919-10-25	No college
F		Ben Scharnus	6 ft 2 in (1.88 m)	173 lb (78 kg)	1917-12-11	Seton Hall
F/C		Irv Schneider	6 ft 3 in (1.91 m)	200 lb (91 kg)	1916-01-11	Abraham Lincoln HS (NY)

Coaches
Head coach

Barney Sedran

Legend
- (DP) Unsigned draft pick
- (FA) Free agent
- (S) Suspended
- Injured

Note: The team's official roster for the ABL Championship Series this season would consist of Jake Ahearn, Ben Auerbach, Paul Chadick, Bobby Dorn, Bob Fitzgerald, Moe Frankel, Ben Goldfaden, Charley Harris, Charlie Hoefer, Steve Juenger, Ben Kramer, Angelo Musi, and Ed Sadowski, with Jake Ahearn, Bobby Dorn, and Bob Fitzgerald only being able to be with the team during their championship series run since they didn't play a single game during the regular season period.

== American Basketball League Standings ==
First Half
Team	Wins	Losses	Winning %
Wilmington Bombers	12	4	.750
New York Americans	9	6	.600
Trenton Tigers	8	6	.571
Philadelphia SPHAs	4	10	.286
Brooklyn Indians^{[a]}	2	9	.182

Second Half
Team	Wins	Losses	Winning %
Philadelphia SPHAs	8	4	.667
Trenton Tigers	7	5	.583
Wilmington Bombers	5	5	.500
New York Americans	2	8	.200

== American Basketball League Championship Series ==
Championship Series
Game	Date	Opponent	Score	Record
Game 1	March 4	@ Philadelphia SPHAs	44–31	1–0
Game 2	March 5	Philadelphia SPHAs	35–42	1–1
Game 3	March 12	Philadelphia SPHAs	44–50	1–2
Game 4	March 18	@ Philadelphia SPHAs	51–56	1–3
Game 5	March 19	Philadelphia SPHAs	45–38	3–2
Game 6	March 25	@ Philadelphia SPHAs	57–36	3–3
Game 7	March 26	Philadelphia SPHAs	57–33	4–3

== Notes ==
^{a} The Brooklyn Indians would drop out of the ABL by the end of the first half of the season, later rebranding themselves as the Brooklyn Eagles for independent play before the second half of the season officially began (notably playing under that name by the time the 1944 World Professional Basketball Tournament happened).
