= 1944–45 Wilmington Bombers season =

- League: American Basketball League (revived original)
- Head coach: Barney Sedran (10–11); Moe Frankel (4–3)
- General manager: Barney Sedran(?); Moe Frankel(?)
- Owner(s): Barney Sedran(?); Moe Frankel(?)
- Arena: State Armory

Results
- Record: 14–14 (.500)
- Place: Conference: 3rd
- Playoff finish: Lost ABL Semifinals 2–1 to the Philadelphia SPHAs.

The 1944–45 Wilmington Bombers season was technically the fourth season played by the Bombers franchise that was operating in Wilmington, Delaware (though they might have existed under a longer period of time due to them apparently previously operating as the Brooklyn Celtics at one point in time), as well as their second season of play under the Bombers name specifically after they had previously played their 1941–42 season as the Wilmington Blue Bombers and their 1942–43 season as the Camden / Brooklyn Indians when they first played in Camden, New Jersey before moving to Brooklyn, New York for the rest of that season. Entering this season, the ABL would not only see itself expand to six teams competing in their league this season (similar to what the rivaling National Basketball League had done this season), but also saw their league abolish the split season format for good (with its playoff format being similar to what the ABL had done for its 1938–39 season). Despite the Bombers being the defending champions in the league this season, Wilmington would end up becoming an average team with a 14–14 record for a third place finish behind only the Trenton Tigers and the Philadelphia SPHAs (though they would see two-time champion head coach Barney Sedran be replaced by player-coach Moe Frankel near the end of the season). As a result of that, Wilmington would qualify for the ABL's playoffs this season by going up against the Philadelphia SPHAs once again in postseason play. However, unlike their previous season of play, the Bombers would end up splitting the first two games played in the semifinal round (with Wilmington blowing out Philadelphia in Game 2) before the SPHAs ended up winning 48–41 in the decisive Game 3 to not only eliminate the Wilmington Bombers from championship play, but also see the Philadelphia SPHAs be the new champions of the ABL (for what later became the final time in their long history) instead.

== Roster ==
Due to information on American Basketball League players being generally hard to find, there are bound to be more gaps and/or inaccuracies found in certain areas on the team's roster spots than usual.

1944–45 Wilmington Bombers roster
Players

Pos.	No.	Player	Height	Weight	DOB	From
G/F		Ben Auerbach	6 ft 1 in (1.85 m)	190 lb (86 kg)	1919-03-01	NYU
F		Cy Boardman	6 ft 2 in (1.88 m)	185 lb (84 kg)	1915-08-24	NYU
F		Jim Borecki	5 ft 9 in (1.75 m)	145 lb (66 kg)	1923-01-12	No college
F	18	Dan Christie	6 ft 2 in (1.88 m)	200 lb (91 kg)	1920-11-19	Manhattan
C		Chuck Conners	6 ft 5 in (1.96 m)	190 lb (86 kg)	1921-04-10	Seton Hall
F/C		Bill Davis	6 ft 3 in (1.91 m)	215 lb (98 kg)	1920-10-03	Notre Dame
C		Phil Elliott	6 ft 6 in (1.98 m)	205 lb (93 kg)	Unknown	No college
G/F		Moe Frankel	5 ft 10 in (1.78 m)	190 lb (86 kg)	1913-01-25	No college
C		George Glamack	6 ft 6 in (1.98 m)	235 lb (107 kg)	1918-06-07	North Carolina
G/F		Bill Goebel	5 ft 10 in (1.78 m)	150 lb (68 kg)	1921-09-16	No college
F		Ben Goldfaden	6 ft 1 in (1.85 m)	185 lb (84 kg)	1913-09-06	George Washington
G		Jimmy Graham	6 ft 0 in (1.83 m)	175 lb (79 kg)	1922-01-16	Scranton
G		Scotty Hamilton	6 ft 2 in (1.88 m)	180 lb (82 kg)	1921-11-21	West Virginia
G		Russ Herman	5 ft 10 in (1.78 m)	175 lb (79 kg)	1914-09-27	No college
F		Ben Kramer	6 ft 1 in (1.85 m)	195 lb (88 kg)	1913-05-03	Long Island
C		Bill Law	6 ft 5 in (1.96 m)	190 lb (86 kg)	1916-09-15	No college
G		Bill Martin	6 ft 1 in (1.85 m)	180 lb (82 kg)	1917-03-31	Oklahoma
		Bob McDonald			Unknown	No college
F		Jimmy McNally	6 ft 2 in (1.88 m)	170 lb (77 kg)	1913-03-09	Manhattan
F		John Murphy	6 ft 2 in (1.88 m)	175 lb (79 kg)	1924-09-13	Simon Gratz HS (PA)
G		Angelo Musi	5 ft 9 in (1.75 m)	145 lb (66 kg)	1918-07-25	Temple
G/F		Richie Niemiera	6 ft 1 in (1.85 m)	165 lb (75 kg)	1921-05-26	Notre Dame
F/C		Mike Novak	6 ft 9 in (2.06 m)	219 lb (99 kg)	1915-04-23	Loyola Chicago
G		Jackie Peters	5 ft 10 in (1.78 m)	170 lb (77 kg)	1916-04-17	St. John's
G		Sid Rabin	5 ft 11 in (1.80 m)	185 lb (84 kg)	1916-07-22	No college
G		Jack Ramsay	6 ft 1 in (1.85 m)	180 lb (82 kg)	1925-02-21	Saint Joseph's
G		Bob Suiter	5 ft 8 in (1.73 m)	160 lb (73 kg)	1919-09-15	No college
G		Stan Szukala	6 ft 1 in (1.85 m)	175 lb (79 kg)	1918-06-12	DePaul
F		Doug Turley	6 ft 2 in (1.88 m)	215 lb (98 kg)	1918-11-25	Scranton

Coaches
Head coach

Barney Sedran
Moe Frankel

Legend
- (DP) Unsigned draft pick
- (FA) Free agent
- (S) Suspended
- Injured

Note: The team's official roster for the ABL Playoffs this season would include Ben Auerbach, Cy Boardman, Ben Goldfaden, George Glamack, Scotty Hamilton, Ben Kramer, Johnny Murphy, Richie Niemiera, Jackie Peters, Stan Szukala, and Doug Turley as the final roster for the season this time around. In addition to that, Wilmington also briefly had a guard whose first name is unknown (though it does start with an H), but has the last name of Smith that played for them this season as well. (Supposedly, a player with the last name of Gilman was also briefly on the team as well, but there's no confirmation on him appearing on the team during that season by comparison to some of the other names that briefly appeared there.)

== American Basketball League Standings ==
Pos.	Team	Wins	Losses	Win %
1	Philadelphia SPHAs	22	8	.733
2	Trenton Tigers	21	9	.700
3	Wilmington Bombers	14	14	.500
4	Baltimore Bullets	14	16	.467
5	New York Westchesters / Westchester Indians / New York Gothams^{[a]}	11	15	.423
6	Washington Capitols / Paterson Crescents^{[b]}	3	23	.115

== American Basketball League Playoffs ==
For this season, the ABL would go back to the original playoff format they had used in the past, which involved the #1 seed going up against the #3 seed and the #2 seed going up against the #4 seed in a best-of-three series before the remaining two teams competed against each other in the championship series (though the championship series for this season would be a best-of-three series this time around instead of a best-of-five series). For the Tigers, as the #2 seed this season, they would go up against the newly-created Baltimore Bullets expansion franchise.

=== American Basketball League Semifinals ===
Semifinal Round
Game	Date	Opponent	Score	Record
Game 1	March 17	@ Philadelphia SPHAs	44–49	0–1
Game 2	March 21	Philadelphia SPHAs	48–29	1–1
Game 3	March 31	@ Philadelphia SPHAs	41–48	1–2

== Notes ==
^{a} The New York Westchesters (sometimes referred to as the Westchester Indians) would move from White Plains, New York to nearby Brooklyn, New York on January 20, 1945, thus subsequently changing their team name from the New York Westchesters (or Westchester Indians) to the New York Gothams in the process.
^{b} The Washington Capitols (no relation to the Washington Capitols team from the BAA/NBA that briefly moved to the ABL at one point in time themselves) would move from Washington, D.C. to Paterson, New Jersey on January 1, 1945, thus subsequently changing their team name from the original Washington Capitols ABL team to the Paterson Crescents in the process. The Capitols held a 2–8 record before moving to Paterson, while the Crescents had a 1–15 record for the rest of the season going forward.
