= 1945–46 Wilmington Bombers season =

- League: American Basketball League (revived original)
- Head coach: Stan Szukala (1–2); Cy Boardman (10–10); Bill McKeever (4–7)
- General manager: Stan Szukala(?); Cy Boardman(?); Bill McKeever(?)
- Owner(s): Stan Szukala(?); Cy Boardman(?); Bill McKeever(?)
- Arena: State Armory

Results
- Record: 15–19 (.441)
- Place: Conference: 4th
- Playoff finish: Lost ABL Semifinals 2–0 to the Philadelphia SPHAs.

The 1945–46 Wilmington Bombers season was technically the fifth season played by the Bombers franchise that was operating in Wilmington, Delaware (though they might have existed under a longer period of time due to them apparently previously operating as the Brooklyn Celtics at one point in time), as well as their third season of play under the Bombers name specifically after they had previously played their 1941–42 season as the Wilmington Blue Bombers and their 1942–43 season as the Camden / Brooklyn Indians when they first played in Camden, New Jersey before moving to Brooklyn, New York for the rest of that season. Entering this season, the Bombers would be one of six teams competing to win the ABL's championship series this season, with those six teams being the same ones that concluded the previous season competing throughout the entire season in an intact manner. Throughout this season, the Bombers would see serious coaching issues occur, as they would go through multiple player-coaches within the season by going from Stan Szukala (who would leave Wilmington for the Chicago American Gears of the rivaling National Basketball League) to Cy Boardman to Bill McKeever by the end of the season. This would result in them officially having their first losing record in the league with a 15–19 record, though they would still qualify for the ABL Playoffs this season due to the Bombers still barely placing ahead of both the Paterson Crescents and Trenton Tigers, though still be significantly behind the third place New York Gothams and the first place tie between the defending champion Philadelphia SPHAs and Baltimore Bullets. Once again, due to the placement of the playoff format the ABL held, the Bombers would go up against the defending champion SPHAs, though unlike the previous season, Philadelphia would sweep Wilmington in the semifinal round. This later became the final playoff series that the Bombers would ever compete in, with the SPHAs failing to repeat as champions against the upstart Bullets that eventually moved into the Basketball Association of America (later National Basketball Association).

== Roster ==
Due to information on American Basketball League players being generally hard to find, there are bound to be more gaps and/or inaccuracies found in certain areas on the team's roster spots than usual.

1945–46 Wilmington Bombers roster
Players

Pos.	No.	Player	Height	Weight	DOB	From
F		John Barr	6 ft 3 in (1.91 m)	205 lb (93 kg)	1918-08-08	Penn State
F		Cy Boardman	6 ft 2 in (1.88 m)	185 lb (84 kg)	1915-08-24	NYU
G/F		Paul Chadick	5 ft 11 in (1.80 m)	175 lb (79 kg)	1918-05-25	Saint Joseph's
C		Ken Corley	6 ft 5 in (1.96 m)	210 lb (95 kg)	1920-05-10	Central Oklahoma
G/F		John Craddock	6 ft 1 in (1.85 m)	165 lb (75 kg)	1922-10-16	Notre Dame
F/C		Bill Davis	6 ft 3 in (1.91 m)	215 lb (98 kg)	1920-10-03	Notre Dame
F/C		Bernie Fliegel	6 ft 3 in (1.91 m)	195 lb (88 kg)	1918-05-13	CCNY
C		George Glamack	6 ft 6 in (1.98 m)	235 lb (107 kg)	1918-06-07	North Carolina
F/C		Harley Graf	6 ft 0 in (1.83 m)	190 lb (86 kg)	1915-02-09	Wisconsin
G		Charlie Hoefer	5 ft 9 in (1.75 m)	158 lb (72 kg)	1921-09-16	Queens College
F		Doug Holcomb	6 ft 4 in (1.93 m)	200 lb (91 kg)	1925-02-09	Wisconsin
C		Johnny Jett	6 ft 5 in (1.96 m)	235 lb (107 kg)	1918-02-09	Wake Forest
G/F		Hal Judenfriend	5 ft 10 in (1.78 m)	155 lb (70 kg)	1920-05-04	CCNY
G/F		Sammy Kaplan	5 ft 11 in (1.80 m)	190 lb (86 kg)	1912-12-22	James Madison HS (NY)
C		Herm Knuppel	6 ft 8 in (2.03 m)	240 lb (109 kg)	1915-02-20	Panzer College
G		Dick Koecher	6 ft 5 in (1.96 m)	195 lb (88 kg)	1926-03-30	Temple
G/F		Bill McCahan	5 ft 11 in (1.80 m)	200 lb (91 kg)	1921-06-07	Duke
F/C		Bill McKeever	6 ft 3 in (1.91 m)	190 lb (86 kg)	1918-01-15	St. John's
F		John Murphy	6 ft 2 in (1.88 m)	175 lb (79 kg)	1924-09-13	Simon Gratz HS (PA)
G/F		Bobby Neu	6 ft 1 in (1.85 m)	170 lb (77 kg)	1917-06-28	DePaul
G/F		Richie Niemiera	6 ft 1 in (1.85 m)	165 lb (75 kg)	1921-05-26	Notre Dame
G/F		Lloyd Rice	6 ft 2 in (1.88 m)	185 lb (84 kg)	1917-09-06	Villanova
F		Jerry Seeders	6 ft 0 in (1.83 m)	170 lb (77 kg)	1917-01-07	Penn
C		Eber Simpson	6 ft 3 in (1.91 m)		1921-12-03	West Point Academy
G		Stan Szukala	6 ft 1 in (1.85 m)	175 lb (79 kg)	1918-06-12	DePaul

Coaches
Head coach

Stan Szukala
Cy Boardman
Bill McKeever

Legend
- (DP) Unsigned draft pick
- (FA) Free agent
- (S) Suspended
- Injured

Note: The team's official roster for the ABL Playoffs this season would include Paul Chadick, Ken Corley, Charlie Hoefer, Doug Holcomb, Sammy Kaplan, Bill McKeever, and Johnny Murphy for the final roster for this season's team. Not only that, but Wilmington would also briefly have a forward that had a last name of Stamm that was on the team as well.

== American Basketball League Standings ==
Pos.	Team	Wins	Losses	Win %
T–1	Baltimore Bullets	21	13	.618
T–1	Philadelphia SPHAs	21	13	.618
3	New York Gothams	18	16	.529
4	Wilmington Bombers	15	19	.441
5	Trenton Tigers	14	20	.412
6	Paterson Crescents	13	21	.382

== American Basketball League Playoffs ==
=== American Basketball League Semifinals ===
Semifinal Round
Game	Date	Opponent	Score	Record
Game 1	March 17	Philadelphia SPHAs	65–69	0–1
Game 2	March 23	@ Philadelphia SPHAs	72–75	0–2
