= 1945–46 Baltimore Bullets season =

ABL professional basketball team season

- League champions
- Conference champions
- League: American Basketball League (revived original)
- Head coach: Red Rosan
- Arena: Tenth Armory Regiment

Results
- Record: 21–13 (.618)
- Place: Conference: T-1st
- Playoff finish: Won ABL championship series 3–1 over Philadelphia Sphas; Lost 1946 WPBT Third Place Consolation Prize Round series 2–0 to Chicago American Gears

The 1945–46 Baltimore Bullets season was the second season played by the original Baltimore Bullets (who are not related to the NBA team that's currently known as the Washington Wizards) when they were in the original American Basketball League, which was in its nineteenth season of existence when combining the six seasons of its original run with the thirteen seasons in its more recent run at this point in time after their hiatus in relation to the Great Depression. Despite having a poor start to their second season of play (months after World War II came to a close), the Bullets would make some key trades during the season to help improve their record for a tied 21–13 first place finish with the defending ABL champion Philadelphia Sphas. Following a tiebreaker first place match that the Bullets would win over the Sphas, Baltimore would sweep the New York Gothams in the semifinal round before defeating the Sphas once again (this time in the championship round) to win their first (and to the ABL's own history, only) championship while playing in the ABL.

== Season overview ==
After almost winning the ABL championship over the Philadelphia Sphas, they sought to improve their roster while having Red Rosan remain as their full-time head coach this time around to improve their chances at winning it all in their second season of existence. However, after they had started the season out with a poor 2–4 start to the season, a trade with the Trenton Tigers where they acquired Ace Abbott (born Ace Goldsmith) from the Tigers helped improve their chances. The Bullets ended up making another critical trade with the Tigers, this time involving future NBA talent Art Spector being traded for another future NBA talent (one that would remain with the Bullets once they made their jump to that league, technically speaking) in Mike Bloom. That trade would help get them a late season push to tie their record with the Philadelphia Sphas with a 21–13 record by finishing the season with a 15–5 record under Abbott, Bloom, and Stanley Stutz's combined leadership. When the Bullets ended up beating the Sphas 63–61 to be crowned the divisional winners of the ABL, they soon faced off against the New York Gothams in the semifinal round and winning, 2–0, in what later turned out to be their last season under that New York name (they would later become the Brooklyn Gothams for the rest of their existence) before having a rematch with the Sphas in the championship round. This time around, however, Philadelphia would win the first game of the championship series before Baltimore ended up winning the rest of the games from the series in order to be crowned champions for the first time in their team history with a 3–1 series victory over the Sphas.

In addition to playing in the ABL, the Bullets were also involved in the 1946 World Professional Basketball Tournament as the sole representative from the ABL's side of things that competed against teams who were either independently ran or were representing the longtime rivaling National Basketball League by comparison. For the Bullets, they competed against some very tough competition throughout the tournament by first competing against the runner-ups of the 1945 World Professional Basketball Tournament in the Dayton Mickeys (who rebranded themselves from the Acmes team name they used that previous year), the Anderson Chiefs (who later became the Anderson Duffey Packers of the NBL and then the Anderson Packers in the NBA and the short-lived National Professional Basketball League), the two-time defending NBL and WPBT champion Fort Wayne Zollner Pistons (who later became the Fort Wayne Pistons (now Detroit Pistons) due to the Basketball Association of America (later National Basketball Association) not allowing brand names to be a part of team names), and the NBL's Chicago American Gears throughout the event. However, while Baltimore ended up winning some very close matches over their first two opponents thanks in part due to some last-minute temporary roster pick-ups just for this tournament (including a pick-up from the ABL semifinal opponent they had beaten earlier on before the WPBT began, the New York Gothams), they could not complete the upset victory over the Zollner Pistons (thus eventually resulting in Fort Wayne getting a three-peat in the WPBT) and were later overwhelmed by young star center George Mikan from the American Gears when Chicago swept Baltimore in the third place consolation prize round 2–0 in their first ever appearance in that event. Despite it ending pretty badly for the Bullets, they would end up being one of the better performances from an ABL team to ever occur throughout the WPBT's history there.

== Roster ==
Due to information on American Basketball League players being generally hard to find, there are bound to be more gaps and/or inaccuracies found in certain areas on the team's roster spots than usual.

1945–46 Baltimore Bullets roster
Players

Pos.	No.	Player	Height	Weight	DOB	From
G/F	14	Ace Abbott	6 ft 1 in (1.85 m)	190 lb (86 kg)	1917-03-20	CCNY
G/F	12	Jake Ahearn	6 ft 2 in (1.88 m)	185 lb (84 kg)	1918-01-06	St. John's
G	5	Hook Anderson	5 ft 11 in (1.80 m)	175 lb (79 kg)	1912-04-08	NYU
G		Jules Bender	5 ft 11 in (1.80 m)	160 lb (73 kg)	1914-04-02	Long Island
C	10	Al Benson	6 ft 5 in (1.96 m)	220 lb (100 kg)	1914-07-27	Seton Hall
G		Irv Biasi	5 ft 10 in (1.78 m)	180 lb (82 kg)	1917-10-24	Western Maryland
F/C	7	Mike Bloom	6 ft 6 in (1.98 m)	190 lb (86 kg)	1915-01-14	Temple
F/C		Price Brookfield	6 ft 4 in (1.93 m)	185 lb (84 kg)	1920-05-11	Iowa State
C		Gerry Bussell	6 ft 5 in (1.96 m)	205 lb (93 kg)	1919-10-17	St. Francis College (Brooklyn)
G/F	9	Moe Dubilier	6 ft 2 in (1.88 m)	210 lb (95 kg)	1915-02-20	John Marshall University
F	23	Tom Flanagan	6 ft 1 in (1.85 m)	170 lb (77 kg)	1918-07-06	No college
F		Ben Goldfaden	6 ft 1 in (1.85 m)	185 lb (84 kg)	1913-09-06	George Washington
G/F	29	Moe Goldman	6 ft 3 in (1.91 m)	175 lb (79 kg)	1913-05-30	CCNY
G/F	32	Paul Hoffman	6 ft 2 in (1.88 m)	195 lb (88 kg)	1925-04-12	Purdue
F/C		Al Kaufman	6 ft 3 in (1.91 m)	225 lb (102 kg)	1920-11-13	No college
G/F		Wibs Kautz	6 ft 0 in (1.83 m)	180 lb (82 kg)	1915-09-07	Loyola Chicago
F		Lee Logan	6 ft 5 in (1.96 m)	180 lb (82 kg)	1919-04-01	Chester High School (PA)
F	3	Johnny Norlander	6 ft 3 in (1.91 m)	180 lb (82 kg)	1921-03-05	Hamline
F		Leo Osiewalski	6 ft 4 in (1.93 m)	190 lb (86 kg)	1921-09-25	Menasha High School (WI)
G	8	Jackie Peters	5 ft 10 in (1.78 m)	170 lb (77 kg)	1916-04-17	St. John's
G/F		Ben Scharnus	6 ft 2 in (1.88 m)	175 lb (79 kg)	1917-12-11	Seton Hall
F		Nat Silverberg	6 ft 3 in (1.91 m)	180 lb (82 kg)	1922-09-06	Long Island
F/C		Bob Sims	6 ft 6 in (1.98 m)	225 lb (102 kg)	1915-07-03	Western Michigan
F/C		Art Spector	6 ft 4 in (1.93 m)	200 lb (91 kg)	1920-10-17	Villanova
G	6	Stanley Stutz	5 ft 11 in (1.80 m)	175 lb (79 kg)	1920-04-14	Rhode Island State College
F/C		Virgil Vaughn	6 ft 3 in (1.91 m)	190 lb (86 kg)	1918-05-15	Kentucky Wesleyan

Coaches
Head coach

Red Rosan

Legend
- (DP) Unsigned draft pick
- (FA) Free agent
- (S) Suspended
- Injured

Roster

Their official roster for the championship winning 1946 ABL Playoffs would involve Ace Abbott (born Ace Goldsmith), Jake Ahearn, Hook Anderson, Al Benson, Mike Bloom, Moe Dubilier, Johnny Norlander, Jackie Peters, and Stanley Stutz (playing under his birth name of Stanley Modzelewski). Then, in the 1946 World Professional Basketball Tournament, three players that previously weren't on the regular roster before that point in time in Charlie Hoefer, Sidney Hertzberg, and Irv Rothenberg (all three of whom would later end up playing for the league that would later become the NBA) would end up playing for the Bullets' roster during that particular World Professional Basketball Tournament (replacing Ace Abbott, Al Benson, and Johnny Norlander only for that event), with Hertzberg's inclusion being especially notable since he was previously playing with their semifinal opponents in the New York Gothams before the WPBT even began for the 1946 year.

== Regular season ==
=== ABL Season Standings ===
Pos.	Team	Wins	Losses	Win %
T–1	Baltimore Bullets - z	21	13	.618
T–1	Philadelphia Sphas - x	21	13	.618
3	New York Gothams - x	18	16	.529
4	Wilmington Bombers - x	15	19	.441
5	Trenton Tigers	14	20	.412
6	Paterson Crescents	13	21	.382

=== Exhibition Game(s) ===
During the season, the Bullets would have at least one game scheduled for the season that was an exhibition game instead of a regular season game (potentially more than that if one were to include their participation in the 1946 World Professional Basketball Tournament there). This game would be held on November 25, 1945 against the rivaling National Basketball League's two-time defending champions in the Fort Wayne Zollner Pistons, with Fort Wayne blowing out Baltimore in a 77–47 beatdown back when the Bullets started out the season in a major losing streak that would last for four games (actually five games including this game). This game would end up being a part of what would be considered a long series of exhibition games played by the Fort Wayne Zollner Pistons throughout this particular season.

=== ABL Schedule ===
Please note that as of 2026, while the schedule for this season involving the Baltimore Bullets has been found, as has been most of the scores showcased, the schedule that's been found for the Bullets this season within the ABL does not currently contain certain specifics like whether a certain opponent was being played in a road match or was played at home for Baltimore, as well as some of the scores for the later games near the end of the regular season not being recorded properly and any of these final scores had any overtime periods involved or not.

#	Date	Opponent	Score	Record
1	November 11	Trenton	36–40	0–1
2	November 18	New York	44–54	0–2
3	November 23	Wilmington	45–55	0–3
4	November 30	Wilmington	56–54	0–4
5	December 1	Paterson	54–49	1–4
6	December 2	New York	48–45	2–4
7	December 7	Philadelphia	72–62	3–4
8	December 8	@ Philadelphia	66–62	4–4
9	December 14	Trenton	42–48	4–5
10	December 16	Trenton	46–48	4–6
11	December 21	Paterson	57–51	5–6
12	December 28	New York	55–54	6–6
13	December 30	Wilmington	39–44	6–7
14	January 4	Wilmington	75–61	7–7
15	January 5	Paterson	69–66	8–7
16	January 6	New York	63–72	8–8
17	January 11	Philadelphia	67–61	9–8
18	January 12	@ Philadelphia	61–56	9–9
19	January 18	Trenton	79–56	10–9
20	January 20	Trenton	45–63	10–10
21	January 25	Paterson	71–57	11–10
22	January 27	Wilmington	51–48	12–10
23	February 1	Philadelphia	65–56	13–10
24	February 2	@ Philadelphia	57–55	14–10
25	February 8	Wilmington	Unknown	Unknown
26	February 9	Paterson	Unknown	Unknown
27	February 15	New York	Unknown	Unknown
28	February 17	New York	Unknown	Unknown
29	February 22	Paterson	Unknown	Unknown
30	February 23	Philadelphia	47–68	Unknown
31	March 1	Trenton	Unknown	Unknown
32	March 3	Wilmington	Unknown	Unknown
33	March 8	Wilmington	Unknown	Unknown
34	March 13	Philadelphia	46–70	21–13
35 (T)	March 16	@ Philadelphia	63–61	22–13

If/When official scores get found for the rest of this season alongside which games were home games and which games were road games, the rest of the schedule will be updated as intended.

== ABL Playoffs ==
=== ABL First Place Tiebreaker ===
Tiebreaker Game: March 16, 1946: @ Philadelphia – Baltimore Bullets defeat Philadelphia Sphas 63–61 for first-place finish.

=== ABL Semifinals ===
(1) Baltimore Bullets vs. (3) New York Gothams: Baltimore wins series 2–0

- Game 1: March 17, 1946(?) @ New York: Baltimore 70, New York 59
- Game 2: March 23, 1946(?) @ Baltimore: Baltimore 81, New York 74

=== ABL Championship Round ===
(1) Baltimore Bullets vs. (2) Philadelphia Sphas: Baltimore wins series 3–1

- Game 1: March 30, 1946 @ Philadelphia: Philadelphia 63, Baltimore 48
- Game 2: March 31, 1946 @ Baltimore: Baltimore 65, Philadelphia 48
- Game 3: April 13, 1946 @ Philadelphia: Baltimore 68, Philadelphia 45
- Game 4: April 14, 1946 @ Baltimore: Baltimore 54, Philadelphia 39

Baltimore also played a match at Schenectady, New York on April 11, 1946 in-between Games 2 and 3 due to them playing a national professional invitational tournament there, with that game being considered a consolation prize round there. The game in question would end up going into overtime, but it ended with the Baltimore Bullets winning 61–58 over the Philadelphia Sphas in an unrelated tournament match that went to overtime.

=== Awards and honors ===
- Stanley Stutz was considered the leading scorer of the entire ABL for the 1945–46 season. (In actuality, Art Hillhouse of the Philadelphia Sphas would claim that honor.)

== World Professional Basketball Tournament ==
Because the Baltimore Bullets officially held the best record in the regular season for the American Basketball League (and later won that league's championship), they were given their first ever invitation to the World Professional Basketball Tournament in Chicago, as well as the first official ABL representative of the WPBT since either the Brooklyn Eagles in the 1944 WPBT or the Philadelphia Sphas in the 1941 WPBT, depending on whether one would count the Brooklyn squad's first half inclusion that year in the ABL or not. In any case, the original Baltimore Bullets franchise would enter the 1946 World Professional Basketball Tournament that would run from March 25–April 8, 1946 for what would become its longest period ever for the WPBT's history as they competed against other teams that were either independently ran franchises or were from the longtime rivaling National Basketball League. In the first round, the Bullets saw themselves go up against the Dayton Mickeys (who were the rebranded version of the runner-up team from the previous year's WPBT event in the Dayton Acmes alongside the Dayton Aviators in 1944 and the Dayton Dive Bombers in 1943), a team that was composed of servicemen players that were primarily from the American Basketball League itself alongside the independently ran New York Renaissance team that had been stationed at the Wright Field in Riverside, Ohio despite World War II officially being over with. Despite the Dayton squad looking to get back into the championship round to potentially get revenge on the two-time NBL and WPBT champion Fort Wayne Zollner Pistons, the Bullets would end up making the first round match go down to the wire with Dayton, with the Baltimore roster upsetting the previous runner-up Mickeys 61–58 in what later became their final match ever played in the history of the WPBT.

As for the Bullets, their second round opponent would see them go up against another independently run team, this time going up against the Anderson Chiefs (sometimes being referred to as the Chief Anderson Meat Packers due to them being a works team that was created by Duffey Meat Packing, Inc.), a newly created team that would beat an NBL team themselves in the Cleveland Allmen Transfers in what later became their final game ever played. Similar to the first round match that Baltimore had against the previous year's runner-ups in the WPBT, the Anderson Chiefs would prove to have a competitive edge to themselves that would get them noticed by the rivaling National Basketball League not long afterward (later being renamed to the Anderson Duffey Packers in the process there), but the Bullets would end up winning another close match in the end, this time with a 67–65 victory instead. The Bullets would later see the Anderson Packers (removing the Duffey part of their name by that time) when both franchises left the ABL and NBL respectively to join the BAA (first for the Bullets) and the National Basketball Association, with them playing against each other a few more times afterward during the 1949–50 NBA season.

In the semifinal round, the Baltimore Bullets would get their own chance to dethrone the two-time defending WPBT champion Fort Wayne Zollner Pistons after they had previously been dethroned as repeating NBL champions by the Rochester Royals earlier on in their season. For the third match in a row, the Bullets would have themselves go down to the wire in a very close match-up with their opponent, this time against the two-time defending champions of the NBL and WPBT. However, unlike their other two matches against the Dayton Mickeys and Anderson Chiefs, the Fort Wayne Zollner Pistons would end up being the team that would get that close finish in the end with a 50–49 defeat that would cause the Zollner Pistons to get back to the WPBT championship round for a third straight year in a row, while the Baltimore Bullets would end up going to the third place consolation round in their first visit to the WPBT ever. Funnily enough, similar to the Anderson franchise, the Bullets and Fort Wayne franchises would end up being able to meet up with each other later on when they both decided to leave their respective leagues to first join the newer Basketball Association of America (though with the Pistons removing the Zollner part of their name due to that league not allowing for sponsorships to be a part of team names) and then the present-day National Basketball Association as regular, competitive teams there from 1948 until 1954 when Baltimore decided to fold their franchise early into the 1954–55 NBA season.

Finally, in the third place consolation prize round, the Bullets would see themselves go up against the National Basketball League's Chicago American Gears, who had been the local favorites to win the entire event (especially with their star center George Mikan playing for the roster), but the fouling out of George Mikan in the second half of their semifinal match against fellow NBL opponents in the Oshkosh All-Stars led to the American Gears losing their semifinal match 72–66 to see the Baltimore Bullets of the ABL for the only time both the championship round and third place consolation prize round were placed into a best of three series instead of a winner takes all match-up. While the championship match-up would prove to utilize the best of three series to its full advantage between Fort Wayne and Oshkosh, the third place consolation prize round would prove to not need it so much by comparison. In the first game of the third place consolation prize round, the Bullets would still keep things competitive with the Chicago American Gears, but the American Gears would end up coming out on top with their first game with a 59–54 victory in Chicago's favor. As for the second and final game in the series, George Mikan and the American Gears would prove to be far too much for the ABL's Baltimore Bullets to overcome in their rematch, as it was the only match Baltimore could not keep close in the WPBT, as they would lose the third place consolation prize with a 65–50 defeat in the second match to be swept 2–0 to Chicago. To make matters worse for them, despite the American Gears not even being in the championship match-up series, George Mikan would end up being named the WPBT's MVP this year, though the Bullets would see two players of theirs in Mike Bloom and Stanley Stutz appear in the All-Tournament Second Team to make up for it.

=== Scores ===
- Won first round (61–58) over the Dayton Mickeys
- Won quarterfinal round (67–65) over the Anderson Chiefs
- Lost semifinal round (49–50) to the Fort Wayne Zollner Pistons
- Lost third place consolation prize series (0–2) to the Chicago American Gears
  - Lost April 5, 1946 third place consolation prize series match (54–59) to the Chicago American Gears
  - Lost April 6, 1946 third place consolation prize series match (50–65) to the Chicago American Gears
    - No Game 3 was played on April 8, 1946 between Baltimore and Chicago.

=== Awards and honors ===
- Mike Bloom, All-Tournament Second Team
- Stanley Stutz, All-Tournament Second Team
