= 1945–46 New York Gothams season =

- League: American Basketball League (revived original)
- Head coach: Barney Sedran
- General manager: Barney Sedran(?)
- Owner(s): Barney Sedran(?)
- Arena: St. Nicholas Arena

Results
- Record: 18–16 (.529)
- Place: Conference: 3rd
- Playoff finish: Lost ABL Semifinals 2-0 to the Baltimore Bullets

The 1945–46 New York Gothams season was technically considered the second season of play for the Gothams franchise within New York City (though it could also be considered the fifth season of play if the connection from the Wilmington Blue Bombers franchise that was operating in Wilmington, Delaware from the 1941–42 season to the Camden / Brooklyn Indians when they first played in Camden, New Jersey before moving to Brooklyn, New York for the rest of the 1942–43 season to the Brooklyn Indians later becoming the Brooklyn Eagles once they left the ABL for the rest of their 1943–44 season to the weirdly operated time for what could be the New York Westchesters / Westchester Indians from White Plains, New York before they moved to New York City to become the New York Gothams for the rest of the 1944–45 season is a legitimate one). Regardless of what it actually was for them, the New York Gothams would be one of six teams competing in the league where the same teams that concluded the previous season would complete this entire season in an intact manner. Unlike the previous season, where the team would perform so poorly that they'd move around a bit and rebrand themselves to the Gothams, the New York Gothams would end up performing a lot better to become one of the winning teams of the ABL this season. The barely above-average 18–16 record put New York ahead of the Paterson Crescents, Trenton Tigers, and Wilmington Bombers to qualify for a playoff spot behind only the first place tiebreaker held between the Philadelphia SPHAs and Baltimore Bullets, with Baltimore being the team the Gothams would go up against in the semifinal round. Unfortunately for New York, they would end up getting swept 2-0 by the Bullets in the semifinal round, with Baltimore also being named the new champions of the ABL not long afterward. Following this season's conclusion, the team would rebrand themselves to the Brooklyn Gothams for the rest of their existence going forward.

== Roster ==
Due to information on American Basketball League players being generally hard to find, there are bound to be more gaps and/or inaccuracies found in certain areas on the team's roster spots than usual.

Player	Position(s)
Pete Berenson	G/F
Tony Bodego	F/C
Gerry Bussell	F
Saul Cohen	G/F
Irv Davis	F/C
Johnny Ezersky	F
Bob Fitzgerald	C
Frido Frey	F/G
Bill Goebel	G
Hy Gotkin	G/F
Leo Gottlieb	G/F
Sonny Hertzberg	G/F
Red Holzman	G/F
Tony Kappen	G/F
Herm Knuppel	C
Hal Korovin	C/F
Tony Krygier	G
Les Mintz	F
Irv Rothenberg	C/F
Ben Scharnus	F/G
Lestor Walsh	C/F

Note: The team's playoff roster for the ABL Playoffs for this season would include Saul Cohen, Johnny Ezersky, Frido Frey, Leo Gottlieb, Sonny Hertzberg, Tony Kappen, Irv Rothenberg, Ben Scharnus, and Lestor Walsh.

== American Basketball League Standings ==
Pos.	Team	Wins	Losses	Win %
T–1	Baltimore Bullets	21	13	.618
T–1	Philadelphia SPHAs	21	13	.618
3	New York Gothams	18	16	.529
4	Wilmington Bombers	15	19	.441
5	Trenton Tigers	14	20	.412
6	Paterson Crescents	13	21	.382

== American Basketball League Playoffs ==
=== American Basketball League Semifinals ===
(3) New York Gothams vs. (1) Baltimore Bullets: Baltimore wins series 2–0

- Game 1: March 17, 1946(?) @ New York: Baltimore 70, New York 59
- Game 2: March 23, 1946(?) @ Baltimore: Baltimore 81, New York 74
