= 1946–47 Wilmington Bombers season =

American Basketball League season

- League: American Basketball League (revived original)
- Head coach: Frank Hoerst (11–17); John P. "Jocko" Collins(4–3)
- General manager: Frank Hoerst(?); John P. "Jocko" Collins(?)
- Owner(s): Frank Hoerst(?); John P. "Jocko" Collins(?)
- Arena: State Armory

Results
- Record: 13–20 (.394)
- Place: Division: 5th (Southern)
- Playoff finish: Did not qualify

The 1946–47 Wilmington Bombers season was technically the sixth (and final) season played by the Bombers franchise that was operating in Wilmington, Delaware (though they might have existed under a longer period of time due to them apparently previously operating as the Brooklyn Celtics at one point in time), as well as their fourth and final season of play under the Bombers name specifically after they had previously played their 1941–42 season as the Wilmington Blue Bombers and their 1942–43 season as the Camden / Brooklyn Indians when they first played in Camden, New Jersey before moving to Brooklyn, New York for the rest of that season. Entering this season, the Bombers would be involved with the ABL's biggest point of existence in its entire overall history with ten total teams competing in the newly created Northern and Southern divisions (instead of using the typical Eastern and Western divisions like the ABL had done back in the 1927–28 season), with five teams being in the Northern Division and five teams (including Wilmington) being in the Southern Division. Unfortunately, this would also be the point where the league's struggles (starting with the decision on having most of their scheduled games be played during the weekend period of time due to their players being paid well in their regular jobs outside of the ABL instead of trying to compete against both of the rivaling National Basketball League and the newly created Basketball Association of America in that regard) would prove to be very damaging against not just most of the teams in the league this season, but the entire ABL as a whole. The constant turnover of players in relation to the old league's decision would lead to Wilmington having a below-average 13–20 record to finish the season in last place within the Southern Division, thus easily failing to qualify for the ABL Playoffs this season in what would become their final season of play. Following this season's conclusion, the Bombers franchise would end up folding operations for good, though a successor team of sorts would later be created in the minor Eastern Professional Basketball League through the Wilmington Jets.

== Roster ==
Due to information on American Basketball League players being generally hard to find (especially by the time the ABL was designated more as a minor league during its later years of existence), there are bound to be more gaps and/or inaccuracies found in certain areas on the team's roster spots than usual.

1946–47 Wilmington Bombers roster
Players

Pos.	No.	Player	Height	Weight	DOB	From
		Franny Bock			1921-09-29	Loyola Maryland
		Vic Bock			1920-08-31	Loyola Maryland
G/F		Bob Boylan	6 ft 2 in (1.88 m)	185 lb (84 kg)	1920-04-11	Saint Joseph's
		Johnny Byrnes			1920-09-14	Nazareth Academy HS (PA)
G/F		Paul Chadick	5 ft 11 in (1.80 m)	175 lb (79 kg)	1918-05-25	Saint Joseph's
C		Ken Corley	6 ft 5 in (1.96 m)	210 lb (95 kg)	1920-05-10	Central Oklahoma
		George Eyrich			1925-03-03	Reading Senior HS (PA)
		Bill Garry			Unknown	St. Benedict's Prep (NJ)
		Buzzy Gillen			1918-08-13	La Salle
G/F		Don Gleasner	6 ft 3 in (1.91 m)	198 lb (90 kg)	1922-12-30	Maryland
		Jim Hoerst			1922-10-31	La Salle
F/C		Paul Kessy	6 ft 3 in (1.91 m)	170 lb (77 kg)	1915-05-17	Milwaukee
G		Jim Kiernan	6 ft 0 in (1.83 m)		Unknown	Georgetown
C		Herm Knuppel	6 ft 8 in (2.03 m)	240 lb (109 kg)	1915-02-20	Panzer College
C		Bill Landis	6 ft 9 in (2.06 m)	215 lb (98 kg)	1925-06-25	Albright College
		Bruce Lindsay			1916-08-31	Delaware
G		Eddie Lyons			1926-07-01	Temple
G		Harry Markellos	6 ft 0 in (1.83 m)	160 lb (73 kg)	1923-02-06	Loyola Maryland
G		Jack McCloskey	6 ft 2 in (1.88 m)	190 lb (86 kg)	1925-09-19	Penn
F		John Murphy	6 ft 2 in (1.88 m)	175 lb (79 kg)	1924-09-13	Simon Gratz HS (PA)
		Babe Nagle			1921-08-30	Salesianum School (DE)
		Ed Poker			1917-10-30	Unknown
		John Van Belle			1921-01-21	Saint Joseph's

Coaches
Head coach

Frank Hoerst
John P. "Jocko" Collins

Legend
- (DP) Unsigned draft pick
- (FA) Free agent
- (S) Suspended
- Injured

Note: In addition to them, they would also briefly have a player with the last name of Sullivan that was on the team as well.

== American Basketball League Season Standings ==
Due to the number of teams in the ABL this season, this would mark the first time since the 1927–28 season where the ABL would utilize divisions within their league in a proper manner, though unlike that season, the ABL would utilize a Northern Division and a Southern Division (which the Bombers competed in) instead of the typical Eastern Division and Western Division that had been on display for most other professional leagues at the time.

=== Northern Division ===
Pos.	Team	Wins	Losses	Win %
1	Brooklyn Gothams - y	24	10	.706
2	Jersey City Atoms - x	14	22	.389
3	Troy Celtics	13	22	.371
4	Paterson Crescents	11	23	.324
5	Newark Bobcats / Kingston Chiefs / Yonkers Chiefs^{a} †	7	17	.292

† – Did not survive the ABL season.

=== Southern Division ===
Pos.	Team	Wins	Losses	Win %
1	Baltimore Bullets - z	31	3	.919
2	Philadelphia Sphas - x	19	14	.675
3	Trenton Tigers - x	17	17	.500
4	Elizabeth Braves - x	15	18	.455
5	Wilmington Bombers	15	20	.429

== Notes ==
^{a} The Newark Bobcats first transferred their franchise from Newark, New Jersey to Kingston, New York on December 23, 1946 (though they did not necessarily change their team name at the time (but if they did, they would have changed it to the Kingston Chiefs instead)) and then moved to nearby Yonkers, New York to become the Yonkers Chiefs on January 22, 1947, before folding operations entirely by the middle of February in 1947.
