= 1943–44 Brooklyn Indians / Eagles season =

- League: American Basketball League (revived original)
- Head coach: Honey Russell (Indians (ABL)); Dutch Dehnert (Eagles (1944 WPBT))
- General manager: Honey Russell(?)
- Owner(s): Honey Russell(?)
- Arena: Jamaica Arena

Results
- Record: 2–9 (.182)
- Place: Conference: 5th (1st half)
- Playoff finish: The Brooklyn Indians would not qualify for the ABL Playoffs due to them dropping out of the league by the end of the first half of the season. (The Brooklyn Eagles would lose the 1944 WPBT championship game 33–50 to the Fort Wayne Zollner Pistons.)

The 1943–44 Brooklyn Indians / Eagles season was technically considered the third (and final?) season played by the Brooklyn-based franchise after they had previously played their 1941–42 season as the Wilmington Blue Bombers out in Wilmington, Delaware (with that team technically returning on their own accord this season as the Wilmington Bombers) and the 1942–43 season having them previously play as the Camden Indians out in Camden, New Jersey before becoming the Brooklyn Indians for the rest of that season going forward. (Interestingly, this team might have some sort of connection to the Original Celtics franchise due to the Brooklyn Celtics potentially moving from Brooklyn to Wilmington in the 1941–42 season.) In any case, the ABL would once again enter the league with one of only five teams competing in their league to start out the season due in part to the issues of World War II, which would still be more than what the rivaling National Basketball League had to start the season out, although the ABL would end their season with the same number of teams as the NBL had by the end of the season (though the ABL would once again not utilize a playoff format similar to what the rivaling NBL had done, with this season being the last hurrah of the original split season format that the ABL had utilized for most of its history). Not only that, but similar to the previous basketball season that was played (back when the Indians first played in Camden, New Jersey before concluding it in Brooklyn properly), due to the trying times of the World War II period at hand, the ABL would agree to terms with the rivaling NBL to prohibit the transfer of players between their two professional basketball leagues without due compensation in order to minimize the effects of many players joining the war effort during this period of time (with this agreement only now being held again without the inclusion of the minor league Connecticut State Basketball League, who had folded operations following the conclusion of the previous season of play). However, despite the ABL now having more games to play in throughout the season due in part to the U.S. government lifting their travel restraints for gasoline consumption, the Indians would end up struggling to complete the first half of the season properly, as they ended up getting a 2–9 record for a last place finish for that particular half of the season before dropping out of the league before the start of the second half of the season.

Interestingly, despite this team leaving the ABL altogether, they decided to reconvene as the Brooklyn Eagles for the rest of the season instead of competing as the Brooklyn Indians this time around. However, unlike the previous roster that was used within the ABL season, the Eagles would decide to reconvene under a mostly new roster with head coach Dutch Dehnert replacing Honey Russell as the team's head coach for the 1944 year. This change would result in the team competing in the 1944 World Professional Basketball Tournament out of their own volition (following a close exhibition match they had against the new NBL champion Fort Wayne Zollner Pistons) after the ABL had previously limited the number of teams competing in that tournament throughout its history due to that league not viewing it as anymore significant than any other professional basketball tournaments held in places like Cleveland, Rochester, or even Worcester, Massachusetts at the time. This decision would prove to be a very beneficial one on their ends during that event, as they would upset two viable contenders in the NBL's prior champions in the Sheboygan Red Skins and the world-famous (all-black) Harlem Globetrotters following a relatively easy match against the military-based Camp Campbell Tankmen, which technically made this team the first and only ABL-based team to successfully qualify for the championship round in the World Professional Basketball Tournament's history after their previous best results came from a third place finish from the Washington Heurich Brewers in the 1940 event. Unfortunately for the Eagles, they would have a rematch of sorts against the Fort Wayne Zollner Pistons, with Fort Wayne blowing them out after the first quarter to get a 50–33 beatdown to conclude Brooklyn's sole run in the event. While this team would never compete in the WPBT ever again, they would see multiple honors come from Mickey Rottner, Jack Garfinkel, and especially Bob Tough during the 1944 tournament.

== Roster ==
Due to information on American Basketball League players being generally hard to find, there are bound to be more gaps and/or inaccuracies found in certain areas on the team's roster spots than usual.

Player	Position(s)
Brownie Carroll	G
Chuck Connors	F/C
Bob Davies	G/F
Jimmy Dunleavy	C
Gene Englund	C
Bob Fitzgerald	F/C
Bill Goebel	G
Steve Juenger	F/C
Mac Kinsbrunner	G
Herm Knuppel	C
Tony Krygier	G/F
Si Lobello	C/F
Al Negratti	F
Phil Rabin	G
Eddie Riska	G
Honey Russell	G
Ben Scharnus	G/F
Ossie Schectman	G/F
George Slott	G
Bob Synnott	C/F
Bob Tough	F
Rocky Valvano	G/F

Note: Brooklyn's official roster for the 1944 World Professional Basketball Tournament included Joe Bellis, Dan Christie, Chuck Connors, Dutch Garfinkel, Bernie Opper, Mickey Rottner, and Bob Tough, with Dutch Dehnert being the team's official head coach for that period of time instead of Honey Russell.

== American Basketball League Standings ==
First Half
Team	Wins	Losses	Winning %
Wilmington Bombers	12	4	.750
New York Americans	9	6	.600
Trenton Tigers	8	6	.571
Philadelphia SPHAs	4	10	.286
Brooklyn Indians^{[a]}	2	9	.182

Second Half
Team	Wins	Losses	Winning %
Philadelphia SPHAs	8	4	.667
Trenton Tigers	7	5	.583
Wilmington Bombers	5	5	.500
New York Americans	2	8	.200

== World Professional Basketball Tournament ==
After the Brooklyn Indians left the ABL and became the Brooklyn Eagles for the rest of the season afterward as an independent team (with ABL players that were working in various military services at the time), the Brooklyn Eagles would end up participating in the 1944 World Professional Basketball Tournament, with the World Professional Basketball Tournament being an annual event that was held on March 20–24, 1944 for this particular year and was mostly held by independently ran teams (which the Eagles technically would be by this time since they entered this tournament as one when they became the Brooklyn Eagles months after they previously left the ABL under their previous Brooklyn Indians name) alongside the four (technically rivaling) National Basketball League teams that remained by this time due in part to World War II. Entering the first round, the Eagles would go up against the Camp Campbell Tankmen, which was an independent military team that operated at the Camp Campbell (now Fort Campbell) area that's situated between Oak Grove, Kentucky and Clarksville, Tennessee (with at least one source claiming they represent the state of Kentucky more than the state of Tennessee and another source claiming they represent the state of Tennessee more than the state of Kentucky) that had their players situated there at the time. Despite the military prowess of the players that were in Camp Campbell, however, the Eagles would end up making quick, easy work of the military team located in either Kentucky or Tennessee (though one can say they can be in both Kentucky and Tennessee) by getting a 55–41 victory in Brooklyn's favor to advance into the second round of the tournament.

For the quarterfinal round, the Eagles would go up against the (technically rivaling) NBL's Sheboygan Red Skins, who not just had a bye in the first round of the tournament alongside another NBL team, but had also entered this season as the defending champions for the 1943–44 National Basketball League season, though they would not finish the season as repeating champions in the NBL by the time it concluded there. At the end of the first half of the game, Sheboygan would see themselves be ahead of Brooklyn with a 23–20 score favoring the Red Skins. However, the Eagles would end up rallying back in the second half with Mickey Rottner scoring 16 points, Jack Garfinkel scoring 14 points, and Bob Tough scoring 9 points to get a 49–43 final score on their ends to not just upset one of the better teams in the tournament, but also enter the next round of the tournament in the process.

In the semifinal round, Brooklyn would go up against the world-famous (all-black) Harlem Globetrotters, a team that famously mixed up comedic chicannery with their stylish basketball play. After barely surviving against the Pittsburgh Corbetts (a team who might be considered a predecessor to the future Pittsburgh Raiders NBL team) in the first round and then getting into a heated match-up against the NBL's Oshkosh All-Stars that may or may not have ended in a disqualification against the All-Stars team (depending on the outlet in question), the Globetrotters looked to return to the WPBT championship match (and potentially have a rematch against the similarly all-black New York Renaissance, which would have been the first time the WPBT would have two all-black teams competing in the championship round since previous efforts had them compete in the semifinal round (if at all) either due to perceived good business plans (at the time) or due to subtle racism) after previously missing out on the last three years they were close to repeating their championship efforts from the 1940 event. Unfortunately for the Globetrotters, not only were they without a few of their players from the previous years they previously competed in, but the Brooklyn Eagles would also see a record-breaking performance (for the tournament) occur from Bob Tough, as he would score a game-high 32 points (tying a tournament record previously set by Sonny Boswell back in 1942) to help lead the Eagles to a major upset in the semifinal round with a 63–41 blowout victory. This would leave the team with one final step in an improbable turnaround from being American Basketball League rejects to being the surprise champions of the World Professional Basketball Tournament.

Entering the championship round, the Brooklyn Eagles would go up against the only other NBL team who had a bye in the first round of this year's tournament, the Fort Wayne Zollner Pistons, who had not only been the new champions of the NBL by the end of that league's season, but had also previously competed against the Brooklyn Eagles in an exhibition match themselves before entering the WPBT this year (with Fort Wayne defeating the Eagles 54–45 there). Unlike most teams, the Zollner Pistons were easily seen as the favorites of the tournament to win the entire event following their NBL championship series victory, with their quarterfinal trouncing over the independently ran Dayton Aviators (who were run by their own military players stationed at the Wright Field in Riverside, Ohio) and their close victory over the all-black New York Renaissance further proving their point to those in the know, despite the game against the Renaissance showcasing some easy openings in mind. Unfortunately for Brooklyn, the Zollner Pistons would shore up whatever weaknesses they had previously displayed after only one single quarter of play, as Fort Wayne would end up using both their strength and length to their advantage to dominate the rest of the way not long afterward, with the score at halftime being 28–11 and the score at the third quarter being 40–15 for the Zollner Pistons (although it was also reported that the score at the end of the third quarter was 42–21 instead). In any case, Fort Wayne would end up letting up a bit in the fourth quarter to secure the blowout victory with the final score of 50–33, ending the Eagles' upset run within what would become their only entry in the WPBT (as well as ending what would technically be the best run from an ABL team in the WPBT's entire history (technically speaking)) and starting the Zollner Pistons' championship run in the WPBT not long afterward. Following the conclusion of the tournament, Mickey Rottner would be a part of the All-Tournament First Team, while both Bob Tough and Jack Garfinkel were named members of the All-Tournament Second Team, with Tough being the leading scorer of the entire tournament with 71 points scored in the four games played throughout the tournament (notably with the 32 points scored in the semifinal round against the Harlem Globetrotters).

=== Scores ===
- Won first round (55–41) over the Camp Campbell Tankmen
- Won quarterfinal round (49–43) over the Sheboygan Red Skins
- Won semifinal round (63–41) over the Harlem Globetrotters
- Lost championship round (33–50) to the Fort Wayne Zollner Pistons

=== Awards and honors ===
- Mickey Rottner, All-Tournament First Team
- Jack Garfinkel, All-Tournament Second Team
- Bob Tough, All-Tournament Second Team, leading scorer

== Notes ==
^{a} The Brooklyn Indians would drop out of the ABL by the end of the first half of the season, later rebranding themselves as the Brooklyn Eagles for independent play before the second half of the season officially began (notably playing under that name by the time the 1944 World Professional Basketball Tournament happened).
