= 1942–43 Harrisburg Senators season =

- League: American Basketball League (revived original)
- Head coach: Dutch Dehnert
- General manager: Dutch Dehnert(?)
- Owner(s): Dutch Dehnert(?)
- Arena: Madrid Palestra

Results
- Record: 4–8 (.333)
- Place: Conference: 4th
- Playoff finish: Did not qualify

The 1942–43 Harrisburg Senators season was the first season played by the Harrisburg Senators franchise that was operating in the capital city of Harrisburg, Pennsylvania, as well as the only season of play by the Senators out in Harrisburg, Pennsylvania while competing in the revived version of the original American Basketball League (although it's suggested that they were the continuation of the Washington Brewers franchise that formerly were the works team of the Christian Heurich Brewing Company). This season was one of the rare few seasons where the ABL would end up having more teams competing in their league than the rivaling National Basketball League, with five teams (including the Senators) competing in the ABL when compared to the four teams in the NBL. However, this would be due to the growing urgency of World War II resulting in trying times for the sport of basketball as a whole, to the point where both the ABL and the rivaling NBL had considered shutting down operations during this season instead, though they both ultimately went against that idea due to the federal government encouraging them both as a means of supporting morale at home. Not only that, but both the ABL and the NBL went into an agreement alongside the minor Connecticut State Basketball League to prohibit the transfer of players between their leagues without due compensation in order to minimize the effects of many of the game's players joining the war effort during this period in time. In any case, due to the combination of the low amount of competitive teams within the ABL this season and the wartime limitations set within the U.S.A. during this period of time (notably the Office of Defense Transportation banning pleasure driving in 1943 in order to minimize civilian gasoline consumption, which made traveling for certain teams challenging during their seasons), the ABL was given its shortest set schedule of games in league history, with the Senators having the second-lowest amount of games played with seven total played this season. Unfortunately for them, outside of a few games that they won (two of which were against the eventual champion Philadelphia Sphas), their sole stint in the ABL was a dud since Harrisburg had a 4–8 record to conclude the season for a fourth-place finish, which later led to the Senators leaving the league the following season and not returning to play again until 1947 under the Eastern Pennsylvania Basketball League (later known as the Eastern Professional Basketball League).

== Roster ==
Due to information on American Basketball League players being generally hard to find, there are bound to be more gaps and/or inaccuracies found in certain areas on the team's roster spots than usual.

1942–43 Harrisburg Senators roster
Players

Pos.	No.	Player	Height	Weight	DOB	From
G		Hook Anderson	5 ft 11 in (1.80 m)	175 lb (79 kg)	1912-04-08	NYU
G/F		Ben Auerbach	6 ft 1 in (1.85 m)	190 lb (86 kg)	1919-03-01	NYU
F		Cy Boardman	6 ft 2 in (1.88 m)	185 lb (84 kg)	1915-08-24	NYU
F/C		Bill Bornheimer	6 ft 3 in (1.91 m)	225 lb (102 kg)	1921-11-25	Georgetown
G/F		Bob Calihan	6 ft 3 in (1.91 m)	200 lb (91 kg)	1918-08-02	Detroit
G/F		Al Caruso	6 ft 0 in (1.83 m)	210 lb (95 kg)	1916-07-08	Manhattan
F		Ben Goldfaden	6 ft 1 in (1.85 m)	185 lb (84 kg)	1913-09-06	George Washington
F/C		Steve Juenger	6 ft 3 in (1.91 m)	195 lb (88 kg)	1915-02-10	Temple
G		Mac Kinsbrunner	5 ft 9 in (1.75 m)	155 lb (70 kg)	1909-03-21	St. John's
C		Herm Knuppel	6 ft 8 in (2.03 m)	240 lb (109 kg)	1915-02-20	Panzer College
F		Ben Kramer	6 ft 1 in (1.85 m)	195 lb (88 kg)	1913-05-03	Long Island
G		Tony Krygier	5 ft 11 in (1.80 m)	170 lb (77 kg)	1915-09-25	Newtown HS (NY)
G/F		Swede Masin	6 ft 1 in (1.85 m)	195 lb (88 kg)	1920-06-07	Panzer College
G/F		Eddie Parry	6 ft 1 in (1.85 m)	175 lb (79 kg)	1918-01-29	Southeastern HS (MI)
G		Jackie Peters	5 ft 10 in (1.78 m)	170 lb (77 kg)	1916-04-17	St. John's
G/F		Porky Rosenthal	6 ft 1 in (1.85 m)	180 lb (82 kg)	1917-10-22	No college
G/F		Charlie Schmidli	6 ft 2 in (1.88 m)	185 lb (84 kg)	1920-08-20	Georgetown
F/C		Bob Synnott	6 ft 3 in (1.91 m)	190 lb (86 kg)	1912-09-27	Theodore Roosevelt HS (NY)

Coaches
Head coach

Dutch Dehnert

Legend
- (DP) Unsigned draft pick
- (FA) Free agent
- (S) Suspended
- Injured

Note: There was also supposedly a player named Tom Matthews (whose position is currently unknown) that also played for the team as well, with there also being a played named Ed Barry on the team that likely was Eddie Parry in this case.

== American Basketball League Standings ==
Pos.	League Standings	Wins	Losses	Win %
1	Trenton Tigers	11	2	.846
2	Philadelphia SPHAs	9	6	.600
3	Camden Indians / Brooklyn Indians^{[a]}	3	5	.375
4	Harrisburg Senators	4	8	.333
5	New York Jewels	1	7	.125

== Awards and honors ==
By the end of the season, Steve Juenger would end up being the leading scorer of the entire league for the tenth season of its return and its sixteenth overall season of its existence. However, due to the shortened up number of games played this season, Juenger would record the lowest number of points scored in an ABL season for such an honor within an ABL season with 116 points scored for an average of 11.6 points per game, which would start the return of the first of the league's double digit points per game averages for the rest of the league's existence.

== Notes ==
^{a} The Camden Indians moved from Camden, New Jersey to nearby Brooklyn, New York on January 18, 1943.
