= 1946–47 Brooklyn Gothams season =

American Basketball League season

- Division champions
- League: American Basketball League (revived original)
- Head coach: Marty Cohen (22–7); Bob Greenberg (2–3)
- General manager: Marty Cohen(?); Bob Greenberg(?)
- Owner(s): Marty Cohen(?); Bob Greenberg(?)
- Arena: Unknown (Jamaica Arena?)

Results
- Record: 24–10 (.706)
- Place: Division: 1st (Northern)
- Playoff finish: Lost ABL Quarterfinals 2-1 to the Baltimore Bullets

The 1946–47 Brooklyn Gothams season was technically considered the third season of play for the Gothams franchise who now operate in the city of Brooklyn for the rest of their existence going forward (though it could also be considered the sixth season of play if the connection from the Wilmington Blue Bombers franchise that was operating in Wilmington, Delaware from the 1941–42 season to the Camden / Brooklyn Indians when they first played in Camden, New Jersey before moving to Brooklyn, New York for the rest of the 1942–43 season to the Brooklyn Indians later becoming the Brooklyn Eagles once they left the ABL for the rest of their 1943–44 season to the weirdly operated time for what could be the New York Westchesters / Westchester Indians from White Plains, New York before they moved to New York City to become the New York Gothams for the rest of the 1944–45 season before they just became the New York Gothams in New York City for the entire 1945–46 season is a legitimate one). Regardless of what it actually was for them, the newly renamed Brooklyn Gothams would be involved with the ABL's biggest point of existence in its entire overall history with ten total teams competing in the newly created Northern and Southern divisions (instead of using the typical Eastern and Western divisions like the ABL had done back in the 1927–28 season), with five teams (including the Gothams) being in the Northern Division and five teams being in the Southern Division. Unlike most other teams that competed in the ABL this season, especially the rest of the teams in the struggling Northern Division, the Gothams would end up performing comfortably well throughout the season, even in spite of them losing star forward Frido Frey to the New York Knickerbockers of the newly-rivaling Basketball Association of America near the end of the season. As a result of their consistent performances throughout the season, Brooklyn would hold the second-best record of the entire season with a 24–10 record, which not only put them as the automatic Northern Division champions for the season due to them being the only team with a winning record there, but also led to them competing against the nearly undefeated (31–3) Baltimore Bullets in the quarterfinal round of the ABL Playoffs, with the winner having an automatic semifinal round bye into the championship round due to the weird way the playoffs were formatted for this ABL season. Surprisingly, despite the Gothams not winning a single game against the Bullets all season long beforehand, Brooklyn would steal Game 1 away from Baltimore with a convincing 80–66 road victory in their quarterfinal match. Despite them having a chance to later steal the series away from the Bullets, the Gothams would falter in their following two games played afterward (with their sole home game being played in Paterson, New Jersey for some odd reason instead of in Brooklyn) and be eliminated from their best chance at the ABL championship in the process, with Baltimore insultingly having their spot in the championship round be forfeited away to the eventual winners (the Trenton Tigers) due to the Bullets deciding to compete in the 1947 World Professional Basketball Tournament.

== Roster ==
Due to information on American Basketball League players being generally hard to find (especially by the time the ABL was designated more as a minor league during its later years of existence), there are bound to be more gaps and/or inaccuracies found in certain areas on the team's roster spots than usual.

Player	Position(s)
Irving "Pickles" Banks	G
Saul Cohen	G
Ted Delson	G
Johnny Ezersky	G/F
Warren Fenley	F
Frido Frey	F
Sol Kopitko	C
Harry Kovner	F
Les Mintz	C
Dick Murphy	G
Sid Rabin	G
Connie Toomb	C
Lestor "Knobby" Walsh	C/F

Note: In addition to those players, there was also a currently unknown guard with the last name of Makin (who might be either George Mackin or Danny Mackin) who was briefly on the team there as well. However, it's also currently unknown who was on the team's playoff roster for this season, though it would be known that star forward Frido Frey wouldn't be on the team by the time the playoffs began due to him being a part of the New York Knicks from the newly-rivaling Basketball Association of America instead.

== American Basketball League Season Standings ==
Due to the number of teams in the ABL this season, this would mark the first time since the 1927–28 season where the ABL would utilize divisions within their league in a proper manner, though unlike that season, the ABL would utilize a Northern Division (which the Gothams competed in) and a Southern Division instead of the typical Eastern Division and Western Division that had been on display for most other professional leagues at the time.

=== Northern Division ===
Pos.	Team	Wins	Losses	Win %
1	Brooklyn Gothams - y	24	10	.706
2	Jersey City Atoms - x	14	22	.389
3	Troy Celtics	13	22	.371
4	Paterson Crescents	11	23	.324
5	Newark Bobcats / Kingston Chiefs / Yonkers Chiefs^{a} †	7	17	.292

† – Did not survive the ABL season.

=== Southern Division ===
Pos.	Team	Wins	Losses	Win %
1	Baltimore Bullets - z	31	3	.919
2	Philadelphia Sphas - x	19	14	.675
3	Trenton Tigers - x	17	17	.500
4	Elizabeth Braves - x	15	18	.455
5	Wilmington Bombers	15	20	.429

== American Basketball League Playoffs ==
Due to the larger number of teams entering this season (the most in one ABL season, in fact), the ABL would set up a newer, larger playoff format for this season, with the intent of it involving "[t]he first team in each division will play in a series of the best three out of five games; the second place clubs in each division will play in a preliminary playoff series of the best two out of three games; the third and fourth place clubs in the official standing of the league at the termination of the 1946–1947 season, regardless of the division in which they are entered by computed on their percentage rating, will play in a preliminary series of the best two out of three games." Because of it, the newly created quarterfinal round that would only appear in this season would have the Gothams (the #1 seeded Northern Division team) going up against the 31–3 Baltimore Bullets (the #1 seeded Southern Division team) in a best-of-three series.

=== American Basketball League Quarterfinals ===
(1N) Brooklyn Gothams vs. (1S) Baltimore Bullets: Baltimore wins series 2–1

- Game 1: March 13, 1947 @ Baltimore: Brooklyn 80, Baltimore 66
- Game 2: March 16, 1947 @ Brooklyn: Baltimore 80, Brooklyn 53 (game was played in Paterson, New Jersey)
- Game 3: March 20, 1947 @ Baltimore: Baltimore 70, Brooklyn 46

== Notes ==
^{a} The Newark Bobcats first transferred their franchise from Newark, New Jersey to Kingston, New York on December 23, 1946 (though they did not necessarily change their team name at the time (but if they did, they would have changed it to the Kingston Chiefs instead)) and then moved to nearby Yonkers, New York to become the Yonkers Chiefs on January 22, 1947, before folding operations entirely by the middle of February in 1947.
