= 1948–49 Brooklyn Gothams season =

American Basketball League season

- League: American Basketball League (revived original)
- Head coach: Hank Greenberg
- General manager: Hank Greenberg(?)
- Owner(s): Hank Greenberg(?)
- Arena: Unknown (Jamaica Arena?)

Results
- Record: 10–30 (.250)
- Place: Conference: 7th
- Playoff finish: Did not qualify

The 1948–49 Brooklyn Gothams season was technically considered the fifth and final season of play for the Gothams franchise who operated in the city of Brooklyn in their final season of play (though it could also be considered the eighth and final season of play if the connection from the Wilmington Blue Bombers franchise that was operating in Wilmington, Delaware from the 1941–42 season to the Camden / Brooklyn Indians when they first played in Camden, New Jersey before moving to Brooklyn, New York for the rest of the 1942–43 season to the Brooklyn Indians later becoming the Brooklyn Eagles once they left the ABL for the rest of their 1943–44 season to the weirdly operated time for what could be the New York Westchesters / Westchester Indians from White Plains, New York before they moved to New York City to become the New York Gothams for the rest of the 1944–45 season before they just became the New York Gothams in New York City for the entire 1945–46 season and then the Brooklyn Gothams in the city of Brooklyn for the entire 1946–47 and 1947–48 season is a legitimate one). Regardless of what it actually was for them, the Brooklyn Gothams would enter this season as one of eight teams competing in the league once again for what would later turn out to be the final time in the franchise's history. Similar to their previous season of play, the Gothams would end up disappointing with their overall performances once again with a 7th-place finish for the season, this time getting a poorly done 10–30 record that put them ahead of only the Atlantic City Tides turned Philadelphia SPHAs. As a result of their poor performance this season, Brooklyn would fail to qualify for the ABL Playoffs once again. Following this season's conclusion, both the Brooklyn Gothams and the Philadelphia SPHAs would leave the ABL due to their own financial issues personally affecting them as a whole. This season would also be notable for Jackie Goldsmith's brief involvement with the team in what later became his final professional basketball season played for his career; Goldsmith would later be better known for his involvement in the 1951 college basketball point-shaving scandal that involved a total of 34 (later 35) past or present college basketball players from that time in seven (later eight) colleges to fix matches by point-shaving for betting purposes (like in Goldsmith's case as a since-retired player) that almost completely ruined the sport of basketball's reputation entirely at the time.

== Roster ==
Due to information on American Basketball League players being generally hard to find (especially by the time the ABL was designated more as a minor league during its later years of existence), there are bound to be more gaps and/or inaccuracies found in certain areas on the team's roster spots than usual.

Player	Position(s)
George Babich	Unknown
Hank Baietti	G/F
Charlie Bollinger	Unknown
Milt Breenberg	Unknown
Ted Delson	G
Norm Drucker	Unknown
Jack French	Unknown
Frido Frey	F
Allen Friedman	G/F
Herbie Gershon	G
Bill Goebel	G/F
Jackie Goldsmith	G
Marv Haspil	Unknown
Johnny Isaacs	G
Walt Kaplowitz	G
Tony Karpowich	Unknown
Sol Kopitko	C
Ira Shain	Unknown
Tony Sisti	Unknown
Stan Starkman	Unknown
George Syby	F/C
Lestor "Knobby" Walsh	C/F
Ed Whalen	G/F
Preston Wilcox	Unknown
Dave Williams	Unknown
Al Young	Unknown

Note: In addition to all of those players, they would also have an unknown player with the last name of Costigan (who's weirdly listed in one resource as Costigan Costigan) and an unknown player with the last name of Shaw (who's weirdly listed in one resource as Shaw Shaw) who was briefly on the team as well. There was also an unknown player with the last name of Walsh and an unknown player with the last name of Whalen listed out as well, but it's likely those two were revealed to be Lester "Knobby" Walsh and Ed Whalen (though he might be named Jim Whalen instead) respectively.

== American Basketball League Standings ==
Pos.	Team	Wins	Losses	Win %
1	Wilkes-Barre Barons	29	12	.707
2	Scranton Miners	26	15	.634
3	Trenton Tigers	25	16	.610
T–4	Paterson Crescents	24	17	.585
T–4	Bridgeport Newfield Steelers	24	17	.585
6	Hartford Hurricanes / Caps	13	26	.333
7	Brooklyn Gothams	10	30	.250
8	Atlantic City Tides / Philadelphia SPHAs^{[a]}	8	26	.235

The Paterson Crescents would defeat the Bridgeport Newfield Steelers 99–80 on March 26, 1949, in the fourth place tiebreaker match for the season, which would ensure their qualification for the 1949 ABL Playoffs for this season.

== Notes ==
^{a} Before this season began, the Philadelphia Sphas moved from Philadelphia, Pennsylvania to Atlantic City, New Jersey to become the Atlantic City Tides in an effort to survive for the long-term. However, after having disappointing attendance results for home games at the Million Dollar Pier in Atlantic City, the team returned to Philadelphia to become the Sphas once again for the rest of the season going forward into their existence on January 16, 1949, with them playing their final home games as a professional basketball team back at their primary home court in the ballroom area of the Broadwood Hotel.
