= 1943–44 New York Americans season =

- League: American Basketball League (revived original)
- Head coach: Eddie Wilde
- General manager: Martin L. Cohen? Phillip Fox? Eddie Wilde?
- Owner(s): Martin L. Cohen; Phillip Fox & Associates
- Arena: Manhattan Center

Results
- Record: 11–14 (.440)
- Place: Conference: 2nd (1st half); 4th (2nd half)
- Playoff finish: Did not qualify

The 1943–44 New York Americans season was (potentially) the third and final professional basketball season played by the New York Americans franchise (though it could also be considered the only season of play for this particular team instead). If this would be counted as their third and final professional season of play, then they would continue as a franchise that first started out as the Brooklyn Hillhouse (sometimes spelled as the Brooklyn Hill House), the Brooklyn Americans in the nearby city of Brooklyn, and the Bronx St. Martins (sometimes spelled as the Bronx St. Martin's) in what would become the final season of the Metropolitan Basketball League as a whole and then continued going as the Bronx Americans in The Bronx area of New York for what would become the inaugural season of the revived original version of the American Basketball League before eventually returning nearly a decade later in New York City. However, this season would also not be a part of the franchise's history for the future American Basketball Association team that first started out as the New York Americans before officially beginning their first season as the New Jersey Americans (with that team now existing as the Brooklyn Nets in the NBA), nor would they be related to the now-former National Hockey League team of the same name. In any case, the Americans basketball franchise would return to the ABL under some (presumably) new ownership during the height of the World War II period due in part to the ABL being in need of having some new teams participating in their league this season due to wartime struggles and in part due to the Americans franchise feeling like they could compete well enough as a professional franchise once again. As such, the ABL would only have five teams competing in their league to start out this season this time around, though they would later decrease the number down to four teams by the start of the second half of the season similar to what the rivaling National Basketball League would do this season. Not only that, but the ABL and rivaling NBL would also go into an agreement with each other to prohibit the transfer of players between their two professional basketball leagues without due compensation in order to minimize the effects of many players joining the war effort during this period of time (with this agreement only now being held again without the inclusion of the minor league Connecticut State Basketball League, who had folded operations following the conclusion of the previous season of play).

The Americans finished the first half 9–6, second behind the returning Wilmington Bombers, who came back (albeit with a minor name change from their original Wilmington Blue Bombers name) after a season-long hiatus due to their home venue being utilized by the U.S. military the previous season. In the second half they went 2–8, the worst record in the league. It would be the Philadelphia Sphas (who had a fourth place finish in the first half of the season with a poor 4–10 record and a losing overall record for this season) that would win the second half of the season with an above-average 8–4 record (being one game ahead of the Trenton Tigers and three games ahead of the Wilmington Bombers, with the Brooklyn Indians deciding to drop out of the ABL on January 4, 1944, before the start of the second half of the season). While the Americans would have had a shot to win the ABL's championship this season had they won the first half of the season, because they failed to win either half of the season, they ultimately were eliminated from competing in the ABL's championship series. Following this season's conclusion, the Americans franchise would end up leaving the ABL for good altogether.

== Roster ==
Due to information on American Basketball League players being generally hard to find, there are bound to be more gaps and/or inaccuracies found in certain areas on the team's roster spots than usual.

Player	Position(s)
Hook Anderson	G
Howie Bollerman	C
Johnny Danyo	F/C
Bobby Dorn	C
George Fasulas	G/F
Bob Fitzgerald	F/C
Nat Frankel	G/F
Leo Gottlieb	G/F
Sidney Hertzberg	G/F
Bobby Holm	G/F
Ed Kantor	G/F
Herm Knuppel	C
Sam Leibowitz	G/F
Andrew Levane	F
Si Lobello	C/F
Bill McKeever	F
Sid Rabin	G/F
Lou Simon	G/F
George Slott	G/F
Stanley Stutz	G/F

Note: There would also be two mislabeled players with the last names of Rosen and Steinman that are suggested to be that of Sid Rabin and Lou Simon respectively that were considered to be a part of the team this season as well.

== American Basketball League Standings ==
First Half
Team	Wins	Losses	Winning %
Wilmington Bombers	12	4	.750
New York Americans	9	6	.600
Trenton Tigers	8	6	.571
Philadelphia SPHAs	4	10	.286
Brooklyn Indians^{[a]}	2	9	.182

Second Half
Team	Wins	Losses	Winning %
Philadelphia SPHAs	8	4	.667
Trenton Tigers	7	5	.583
Wilmington Bombers	5	5	.500
New York Americans	2	8	.200

== Notes ==
^{a} The Brooklyn Indians would drop out of the ABL by the end of the first half of the season, later rebranding themselves as the Brooklyn Eagles for independent play before the second half of the season officially began (notably playing under that name by the time the 1944 World Professional Basketball Tournament happened).
