= 1947–48 Brooklyn Gothams season =

American Basketball League season

- League: American Basketball League (revived original)
- Head coach: Bob Greenberg
- General manager: Bob Greenberg(?)
- Owner(s): Bob Greenberg(?)
- Arena: Unknown (Jamaica Arena?)

Results
- Record: 8–20 (.286)
- Place: Conference: 7th
- Playoff finish: Did not qualify

The 1947–48 Brooklyn Gothams season was technically considered the fourth season of play for the Gothams franchise who now operate in the city of Brooklyn for the rest of their existence going forward (though it could also be considered the seventh season of play if the connection from the Wilmington Blue Bombers franchise that was operating in Wilmington, Delaware from the 1941–42 season to the Camden / Brooklyn Indians when they first played in Camden, New Jersey before moving to Brooklyn, New York for the rest of the 1942–43 season to the Brooklyn Indians later becoming the Brooklyn Eagles once they left the ABL for the rest of their 1943–44 season to the weirdly operated time for what could be the New York Westchesters / Westchester Indians from White Plains, New York before they moved to New York City to become the New York Gothams for the rest of the 1944–45 season before they just became the New York Gothams in New York City for the entire 1945–46 season and then the Brooklyn Gothams in the city of Brooklyn for the entire 1946–47 season is a legitimate one). Regardless of what it actually was for them, the Brooklyn Gothams would originally be one of eight teams competing in the league this season before it went down to seven teams early on in the season. However, unlike their previous two seasons of play, the Gothams would see themselves seriously disappoint themselves in terms of overall production throughout the season. Instead of continuing their recent playoff success, Brooklyn would end up showcasing a very poor 8–20 record for a 7th-place finish that technically put them ahead of only the Lancaster (Red) Roses in terms of teams that were in the ABL throughout the season. However, their official last place finish in the season would easily result in the Brooklyn Gothams failing to qualify for the ABL Playoffs for the first time since 1945.

== Roster ==
Due to information on American Basketball League players being generally hard to find (especially by the time the ABL was designated more as a minor league during its later years of existence), there are bound to be more gaps and/or inaccuracies found in certain areas on the team's roster spots than usual.

Player	Position(s)
Hank Baietti	G/F
Sid Blair	F
Saul Cohen	G
Ted Delson	G
Johnny Ezersky	G/F
Warren Fenley	F
Tom Flanagan	F/C
Jim Fox	C
Herbie Gershon	G
Martie Goldstein	Unknown
Coulby Gunther	F
Tony Kappen	G
Sol Kopitko	C
Barry Kreisberg	Unknown
Lenny Lesser	Unknown
Red Paris	G
Bill Pless	F/C
Sid Rabin	G
Cass Rosenman	Unknown
Al Rossi	G/F
Ben Schamus	F
Harry Shor	F
Lestor "Knobby" Walsh	C/F
Preston Wilcox	Unknown

Note: In addition to all of those players, they would also have an unknown player with the last name of Warrick who was briefly on the team as well.

== American Basketball League Standings ==
Due to the decreased number of teams this season, the ABL would remove divisions from their league this season going forward after previously using them for their previous season of play.

Pos.	Team	Wins	Losses	Win %
1	Wilkes-Barre Barons	26	8	.765
2	Paterson Crescents	19	16	.543
3	Trenton Tigers	17	15	.531
4	Jersey City Atoms / Scranton Miners^{[a]}	16	16	.500
5	Elizabeth Braves / Hartford Hurricanes^{[b]}	11	12	.478
6	Philadelphia SPHAs	13	19	.406
7	Brooklyn Gothams	8	20	.286
8	Lancaster (Red) Roses^{[c]}	1	5	.167

== Notes ==
^{a} Originally, the Jersey City Atoms would move from Jersey City, New Jersey to nearby Union City, New Jersey on January 16, 1948 (though it doesn't appear that the Jersey City Atoms rebranded their team by this point in time) before moving again to Scranton, Pennsylvania to become the Scranton Miners twelve days later on January 28, 1948, for the rest of the season going forward.
^{b} The Elizabeth Braves would move from Elizabeth, New Jersey to Hartford, Connecticut on December 19, 1947, to become the Hartford Hurricanes for the rest of the season.
^{c} The Lancaster Roses (sometimes referred to as the Lancaster Red Roses instead) would end up withdrawing their operations from the ABL early in the season on December 4, 1947, to return to the Eastern Professional Basketball League not long afterward.
