= 1944–45 Westchester Indians / New York Westchesters / New York Gothams season =

- League: American Basketball League (revived original)
- Head coach: Honey Russell
- General manager: Honey Russell(?)
- Owner(s): Honey Russell(?)
- Arena: White Plains Community Center (Westchester); St. Nicholas Arena (New York)

Results
- Record: 11–15 (.423)
- Place: Conference: 5th
- Playoff finish: Did not qualify

The 1944–45 Westchester Indians / New York Westchesters / New York Gothams season was technically considered the inaugural season of play for the uniquely operated New York-based franchise (though it could also be considered the fourth season of play if the connection from the Wilmington Blue Bombers franchise that was operating in Wilmington, Delaware from the 1941–42 season to the Camden / Brooklyn Indians when they first played in Camden, New Jersey before moving to Brooklyn, New York for the rest of the 1942–43 season to the Brooklyn Indians later becoming the Brooklyn Eagles once they left the ABL for the rest of their 1943–44 season is a legitimate one). Regardless of what it actually was, the Westchester Indians (sometimes referred to as the New York Westchesters) turned New York Gothams would be one of six teams competing in the league this season, with the ABL permanently utilizing a proper regular season format (with a playoff format similar to what the rivaling National Basketball League held in its prior four seasons of existence) instead of the split season format used for most of its existence by this point in time. Originally, the team would play their games in Westchester, New York, though the White Plains Community Center within nearby White Plains, New York held their official home venue early on in the season (hence the confusing distinction between the Westchester Indians and New York Westchesters early on in the season). However, by January 20, 1945, after a poor start to the season, the team would move from the White Plains (or Westchester) to nearby Brooklyn for the rest of their existence going forward to become the New York Gothams for the rest of the season. Despite the name change during the season, however, the New York-based franchise would fail to qualify for the ABL Playoffs due to them getting a below-average 11–15 record for a fifth place finish that only put them well-ahead of the Washington Capitols turned Paterson Crescents expansion team, with them being a few games shy from taking the final playoff spot away from the Baltimore Bullets expansion team.

== Roster ==
Due to information on American Basketball League players being generally hard to find, there are bound to be more gaps and/or inaccuracies found in certain areas on the team's roster spots than usual.

Player	Position(s)
Hook Anderson	G/F
Jules Bender	F
Tony Bodego	F/C
Howie Bollerman	C
Tommy Byrnes	F/C
Lee Craddock	F/C
Bob Davies	G/F
Zeppy Feiter	G
Warren Fenley	F/C
Bob Fitzgerald	C
Dick Fitzgerald	G/F
Abe Gerchick	G
Tom Gorman	F
Sonny Hertzberg	G/F
Mike McCarron	G
John O'Brien	G/F
Honey Russell	G
Allie Schuckman	G
Chubby Sherman	F
Lou Spindell	G
Red Wallace	G/F

Note: In addition to all of these players, this team would also briefly have an unknown guard with the last name of Criss and an unknown guard with the last name of Merrill that would appear on the team as well.

== American Basketball League Standings ==
Pos.	Team	Wins	Losses	Win %
1	Philadelphia SPHAs	22	8	.733
2	Trenton Tigers	21	9	.700
3	Wilmington Bombers	14	14	.500
4	Baltimore Bullets	14	16	.467
5	Westchester Indians / New York Westchesters / New York Gothams^{[a]}	11	15	.423
6	Washington Capitols / Paterson Crescents^{[b]}	3	23	.115

== Notes ==
^{a} The New York Westchesters (sometimes referred to as the Westchester Indians) would move from White Plains, New York to nearby Brooklyn, New York on January 20, 1945, thus subsequently changing their team name from the New York Westchesters (or Westchester Indians) to the New York Gothams in the process.
^{b} The Washington Capitols (no relation to the Washington Capitols team from the BAA/NBA that briefly moved to the ABL at one point in time themselves) would move from Washington, D.C. to Paterson, New Jersey on January 1, 1945, thus subsequently changing their team name from the original Washington Capitols ABL team to the Paterson Crescents in the process. The Capitols held a 2–8 record before moving to Paterson, while the Crescents had a 1–15 record for the rest of the season going forward.
