= 1942–43 Camden / Brooklyn Indians season =

- League: American Basketball League (revived original)
- Head coach: Honey Russell
- General manager: Honey Russell(?)
- Owner(s): Honey Russell(?)
- Arena: Convention Hall (Camden); Grand Prospect Hall (Brooklyn)

Results
- Record: 3–5 (.375)
- Place: Conference: 3rd
- Playoff finish: Did not qualify

The 1942–43 Camden / Brooklyn Indians season was technically the second season played by the Indians franchise after they had previously played their 1941–42 season as the Wilmington Blue Bombers out in Wilmington, Delaware. Originally, the franchise moved from Wilmington, Delaware to Camden, New Jersey because the Wilmington Blue Bombers would end up losing access to their home venue this season due to World War II being a growing presence upon the world. However, after only playing a total of four games in Camden, New Jersey, the Indians would move to the nearby state of New York in the city of Brooklyn to become the Brooklyn Indians for the rest of the season instead. (Interestingly, the Indians might have some sort of a connection to the Original Celtics franchise due to the Brooklyn Celtics potentially moving from Brooklyn to Wilmington in the 1941–42 season.) In any case, the ABL would only have five total teams competing in their league this season due to World War II's growing presence, though they would see themselves have more teams in their league than the rivaling National Basketball League for a change of pace for this season (though this also was a season where both leagues considered shutting down operations until World War II concluded properly). Not only that, but the ABL would have to deal with travel restrictions that were laid out by the U.S. government during this season in order to minimize gasoline consumption, as well as had to agree to financial stipulations with both the NBL and the minor league Connecticut State Basketball League in order to prohibit the transfer of players between their leagues without due compensation in order to minimize the effects of many of the game's players joining the war effort during this period in time. While all of this resulted in the ABL operating in a proper regular season format this time around (though with a best-of-seven championship series only instead of a proper playoff event like the rivaling NBL held to end this season), it also led to the Indians playing the fewest amount of games in the season alongside the returning New York Jewels with 8 total games on their ends, with their barely below-average 3–5 record resulting in a third place finish ahead of both the Jewels and the newly added Harrisburg Senators, but behind the Philadelphia Sphas and Trenton Tigers, which led to the Indians failing to qualify for the ABL's championship series in the process.

== Roster ==
Due to information on American Basketball League players being generally hard to find, there are bound to be more gaps and/or inaccuracies found in certain areas on the team's roster spots than usual.

Player	Position(s)
Ed Conaty	G
Moe Dubilier	G/F
Moe Frankel	G/F
Mel Hirsch	G/F
Charlie Hoefer	G/F
Sammy Kaplan	G/F
Mac Kinsbrunner	G
Chick Reiser	G/F
Ed Sadowski	C
Nick Shaback	G/F
Moe Spahn	G/F
Harry Walters	G/F
Earl Yost	G/F

== American Basketball League Standings ==
Pos.	League Standings	Wins	Losses	Win %
1	Trenton Tigers	11	2	.846
2	Philadelphia SPHAs	9	6	.600
3	Camden Indians / Brooklyn Indians^{[a]}	3	5	.375
4	Harrisburg Senators	4	8	.333
5	New York Jewels	1	7	.125

== Notes ==
^{a} The Camden Indians moved from Camden, New Jersey to nearby Brooklyn, New York on January 18, 1943.
