= 1941–42 Wilmington Blue Bombers season =

- League champions
- Conference champions
- League: American Basketball League (revived original)
- Head coach: Barney Sedran
- General manager: Barney Sedran
- Owner(s): Barney Sedran(?)
- Arena: State Armory

Results
- Record: 18–7 (.720)
- Place: Conference: 1st (both halves (overall))
- Playoff finish: ABL Champions (Won both halves of the season to be named the champions of the ABL by default this season.)

The 1941–42 Wilmington Blue Bombers season was the first ever season played by the Wilmington Blue Bombers franchise that was operating in Wilmington, Delaware, as well as their only season of play under the Blue Bombers name specifically. However, it's alleged that the Blue Bombers were actually the Brooklyn Celtics franchise from the previous season that moved to Wilmington, Delaware before the start of this season, meaning the Original Celtics connection might have technically continued with this team here as well. Regardless of whether the Wilmington squad would have any connection to the Original Celtics squad or not, the Blue Bombers were one of five teams entering the ABL this season in a split season format to compete for the league's championship (although it later turned into a four team league by the end of the first half of the season), with a potential championship series being in mind in the event two teams win the first and second halves of the season. Despite the Blue Bombers being the equivalent of an expansion franchise, however, they would prove to be more talented than their looks as a new franchise would suggest on their ends, as Wilmington ended up becoming the best team of the entire league throughout this particular season of play. The first half of the season would see the Blue Bombers get a first place finish with an above-average 10–3 record ahead of the Philadelphia Sphas, while the second half of the season saw Wilmington finish with a barely above-average 8–4 record, being two games above the technically returning Trenton Tigers there. Not only that, but because the Wilmington Blue Bombers won both halves of the season, the ABL wouldn't host a championship series this time around, thus marking the first (and technically only) time a champion in the ABL was named by default due to the regular season winners proving their worth there. While the Blue Bombers wanted to defend their title properly for the following season, due to the growing presence of World War II making the State Armory being unusable for the Blue Bombers team since the U.S. military was using the State Armory for training purposes (and Wilmington didn't have other viable venues for the team to play in), the Wilmington Blue Bombers were forced to move to Camden, New Jersey (later Brooklyn, New York) to play the upcoming season as the Camden / Brooklyn Indians.

== Roster ==
Due to information on American Basketball League players being generally hard to find, there are bound to be more gaps and/or inaccuracies found in certain areas on the team's roster spots than usual.

1941–42 Wilmington Blue Bombers roster
Players

Pos.	No.	Player	Height	Weight	DOB	From
C		Al Benson	6 ft 5 in (1.96 m)	220 lb (100 kg)	1914-07-27	Seton Hall
G/F		Moe Becker	6 ft 1 in (1.85 m)	185 lb (84 kg)	1917-02-24	Duquesne
F/C		Jerry Bush	6 ft 3 in (1.91 m)	200 lb (91 kg)	1914-09-06	St. John's
G/F		Paul Chadick	5 ft 11 in (1.80 m)	175 lb (79 kg)	1918-05-25	Saint Joseph's
F/C		Bernie Fliegel	6 ft 3 in (1.91 m)	195 lb (88 kg)	1918-05-13	CCNY
G/F		Moe Frankel	5 ft 10 in (1.78 m)	190 lb (86 kg)	1913-01-25	No college
G		Charlie Hoefer	5 ft 9 in (1.75 m)	158 lb (72 kg)	1921-09-16	Queens College
G/F		Sammy Kaplan	5 ft 11 in (1.80 m)	190 lb (86 kg)	1912-12-22	James Madison HS (NY)
G		Mac Kinsbrunner	5 ft 9 in (1.75 m)	155 lb (70 kg)	1909-03-21	St. John's
G/F		Chick Reiser	5 ft 11 in (1.80 m)	165 lb (75 kg)	1914-12-17	Pratt Institute
C		Ed Sadowski	6 ft 5 in (1.96 m)	240 lb (109 kg)	1917-07-11	Seton Hall
G		Nick Shaback	5 ft 11 in (1.80 m)	180 lb (82 kg)	1918-09-10	James Monroe HS (NY)
G/F		Moe Spahn	6 ft 0 in (1.83 m)	185 lb (84 kg)	1912-05-03	CCNY
G/F		Corky Stanton	6 ft 0 in (1.83 m)	180 lb (82 kg)	1914-02-21	Union College

Coaches
Head coach

Barney Sedran

Legend
- (DP) Unsigned draft pick
- (FA) Free agent
- (S) Suspended
- Injured

== American Basketball League Standings ==
First Half
Team	Wins	Losses	Winning %
Wilmington Blue Bombers	10	3	.769
Philadelphia SPHAs	8	6	.571
Washington Brewers	5	6	.455
Trenton Tigers	5	8	.385
New York Jewels^{[a]}	1	6	.143

Second Half
Team	Wins	Losses	Winning %
Wilmington Blue Bombers	8	4	.667
Trenton Tigers	6	6	.500
Philadelphia SPHAs	5	7	.417
Washington Brewers	5	7	.417

== Aborted American Basketball League Championship Series ==
Originally, the American Basketball League would have the best two teams from each halves of the split season compete against each other in a best-of-seven (or best-of-five) championship series for this season. However, because the Wilmington Blue Bombers won both halves of this season, the ABL ultimately cancelled the planned championship series at hand and named the newly-created Wilmington Blue Bombers as the default champions of the league this season, which marked the first time the ABL didn't have a proper playoff series (or even round-robin tournament) of sorts occur to determine a proper champion for the season.

== Notes ==
^{a} The New York Jewels would drop out of the ABL by the end of the first half of the season on January 15, 1942.
