= New York Americans (disambiguation) =

New York Americans, colloquially known as the Amerks, were an American ice hockey team based in New York City, New York which played in the National Hockey League from 1925 to 1942.

New York Americans may also refer to:

- New York Americans (soccer), were an American soccer team based in New York, New York, which played in both the first American Soccer League and second American Soccer League from 1931 to 1956
- New York Americans (AFL), were an American football team based in New York, New York which played in the third American Football League during 1941
- New York Americans (ABL), were an American basketball team based in New York, New York which played in the American Basketball League from 1943 to 1944
- New York Americans (ABA), were an American basketball team based in Teaneck, New Jersey which played in the American Basketball Association during 1967
