= Harrisburg Senators (disambiguation) =

The Harrisburg Senators are a minor league baseball team in the Double-A Northeast league that has played since 1987.

Harrisburg Senators may also refer to:

- Harrisburg Senators (basketball), a former American Basketball League team
- Harrisburg Senators (1893-1952), a series of defunct minor league baseball teams
- Members of the Pennsylvania State Senate, which convenes in Harrisburg
