= Hal Korovin =

American basketball player (1925–2021)

Personal information
- Born: April 19, 1925 Brooklyn, New York, U.S.
- Died: June 5, 2021 (aged 96) Boca Raton, Florida, U.S.
- Listed height: 6 ft 5 in (1.96 m)
- Listed weight: 205 lb (93 kg)

Career information
- College: CCNY (1943–1945)
- Playing career: 1945–1950
- Position: Center

Career history
- 1945–1946: New York Gothams
- 1945–1946: Dunmore
- 1945–1956: Pitston
- 1945–1946: Long Island Bombers
- 1945–1946: New York Jewels
- 1946–1947: Paterson Crescents
- 1946–1947: Allentown Rockets
- 1946–1947: Mohawk Redskins
- 1946–1947: Troy Celtics
- 1947: Flint Dow A.C.'s
- 1947–1948: Hazleton
- 1948–1949: Mohawk Redskins
- 1948–1950: Kokoko Clowns
- 1949–1950: Long Island Bombers
- 1949–1950: Berwick
- 1949–1950: Danbury
- 1949–1950: Brooklyn All-Stars

Harold Korovin (April 19, 1925 – June 5, 2021) was an American professional basketball player. He played for the Flint Dow A.C.'s in the National Basketball League for three games during the 1947–48 season and averaged 3.7 points per game. He also played in various other leagues for many different teams during the early era of professional basketball in the United States. Korovin died in Boca Raton, Florida on June 5, 2021, at the age of 96.
