= Joe Cackovic =

American basketball player

- Cackovic with the Harrisburg Senators

Personal information
- Born: February 21, 1923 Steelton, Pennsylvania, U.S.
- Died: December 16, 1984 (aged 61)

Career information
- High school: Steelton (Steelton, Pennsylvania)
- Playing career: 1947–1953
- Position: Forward

Career history

Playing
- 1947–1951: Harrisburg Senators
- 1951–1952: Lancaster Rockets
- 1952–1953: Harrisburg Capitols

Coaching
- 1948–1949, 1952–1953: Harrisburg Senators / Capitols

Career highlights
- All-EPBL First Team (1950); All-EPBL Second Team (1951)

Joseph Anthony Cackovic (February 21, 1923 – December 18, 1984) was an American professional basketball player and coach. He spent the majority of his career with the Harrisburg Senators / Capitols of the Eastern Professional Basketball League (EPBL).

Cackovic emerged as a star basketball player while at Steelton High School in Steelton, Pennsylvania, and graduated in 1941. He was signed by the Senators in 1947 after bargaining with general manager Bill Britsch. Cackovic had been playing for the York Victory in independent circles and negotiated to still be able to play with the team despite being contracted to the Senators.

Cackovic led the EPBL in scoring during his first season with 430 points. He served as a player-coach for 9 games during the 1948–49 season. Cackovic was selected to the All-EPBL First Team during the 1949–50 season as he averaged 18.9 points per game. He was selected to the All-EPBL Second Team in the 1950–51 season as he averaged 14.8 points per game. Cackovic moved to the Lancaster Rockets for the 1951–52 season. He returned to Harrisburg as the team was renamed the Capitols for the 1952–53 season and served as the player-coach.
