= Scotty Hamilton =

American basketball player and coach (1921–1976)

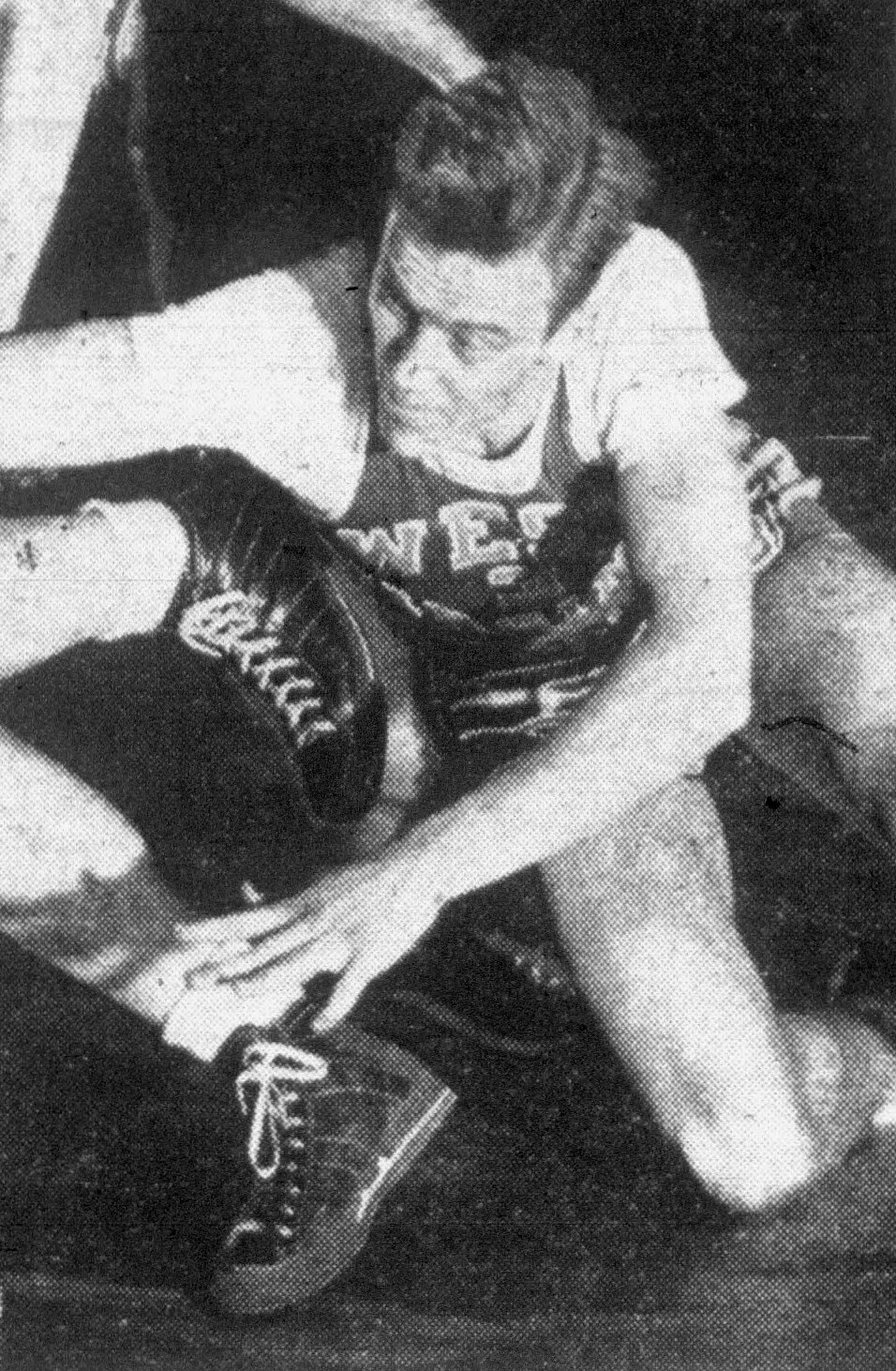
- Hamilton in January 1943

Personal information
- Born: November 21, 1921 Grafton, West Virginia, U.S.
- Died: April 11, 1976 (aged 54) Marietta, Ohio, U.S.
- Listed height: 5 ft 11 in (1.80 m)
- Listed weight: 190 lb (86 kg)

Career information
- High school: Grafton (Grafton, West Virginia)
- College: West Virginia (1940–1943)
- BAA draft: 1947: — round, —
- Drafted by: Baltimore Bullets
- Position: Point guard
- Coaching career: 1947–1959

Career history

Playing
- 1944–1945: Wilmington Bombers

Coaching
- 1947–1949: Welch HS
- 1950–1952: Washington and Lee
- 1952–1959: Broadway HS

Career highlights
- First-team All-American – Helms (1942); NIT champion (1942)
- Stats at Basketball Reference

Career coaching record
- College: 13–39 (.250)

Floyd Scott Hamilton (November 21, 1921 – April 11, 1976) was an American basketball player and coach.

A Grafton, West Virginia, native, Hamilton played college basketball for the West Virginia Mountaineers. As a junior in the 1941–42 season, Hamilton led the Mountaineers to the 1942 National Invitation Tournament and was named an All-American by the Helms Athletic Foundation at the end of the season. He was the first WVU basketball player to earn this designation.

Following the close of his college career in 1943, Hamilton joined the Navy to fight in World War II and upon his return played for a variety of professional and semi-professional teams and was drafted by the Baltimore Bullets of the Basketball Association of America (BAA), though he never played for the team. He began coaching in 1947 as the head coach for Welch High School in Welch, West Virginia, and in 1950 made a move to the college ranks as he was named head coach for Washington and Lee. Hamilton coached the Generals for two seasons, compiling a record of 13–39, before resigning in 1952.

Hamilton spent the majority of his remaining years as a high school coach and administrator. He died on April 11, 1976, at age 54.
