= Ben Auerbach =

American basketball player (1919–1993)

- Auerbach at NYU, c. 1940

Personal information
- Born: March 1, 1919 New York City, U.S.
- Died: June 18, 1993 (aged 74) Delray Beach, Florida, U.S.

Career information
- High school: DeWitt Clinton (The Bronx, New York)
- College: NYU (1938–1941)
- Playing career: 1941–1947
- Position: Guard
- Number: 18

Career history
- 1941: Brooklyn Celtics
- 1941: Harrisburg Senators
- 1943–1945: Wilmington Bombers
- 1945–1947: Paterson Crescents

Career highlights
- ABL champion (1944); Haggerty Award (1940)

Benjamin Auerbach (March 1, 1919 – June 18, 1993) was an early American professional basketball player in the American Basketball League (ABL). He had a standout college career for New York University. Despite the shared surname, Ben Auerbach is not related to the Hall of Fame coach Red Auerbach.

== College ==
Auerbach grew up in New York City, attended DeWitt Clinton High School, and enrolled at NYU in the fall of 1937. Playing the guard, he was forced to abstain from playing on the school's varsity team as a freshman because it was not permitted during that era of college basketball. When he became eligible in 1938–39 as a sophomore, it was the first of three seasons he was a full-time starter. He scored 147 points in his first year, one in which the NYU Violets finished with an 11–11 record. This scoring total placed him ninth in the New York City metropolitan area. As the premier player on the team, Auerbach specialized in defending the opponents' top scorers, and once he even had to play center in a game against Notre Dame.

As a junior in 1939–40, Auerbach helped guide NYU to an 18–0 season record before losing their final game to rival City College of New York (CCNY). He had a personally successful season as well and was named First Team All-Met. Auerbach was honored with the coveted Haggerty Award, given annually since 1935–36 to the best male collegiate basketball player in the greater New York City area. The Violets did not participate in any postseason tournaments despite their record. The school, citing exhaustion on behalf of the players, declined all invitations. The following year, the team finished with a 13–6 record with Auerbach being the captain. He was declared ineligible for the final two games of the year (and consequently, his collegiate career), but still finished in the top 25 for scoring in the metropolitan area.

He has since been inducted into the NYU Athletics Hall of Fame.

== Professional ==
After college, Auerbach played in the American Basketball League, which was semi-professional and considered the top league in the East. His first team was the Brooklyn Celtics, but he only played in three games for them toward the end of the 1941 season. He then missed all of the 1941–42 season before joining the Harrisburg Senators the following year. Due to World War II, the league only had five total teams. Auerbach only played in one game for the Senators.

He joined the Wilmington Bombers the next season (1943–44) as they won the ABL championship, four games to three in a best-of-seven finals, over the Philadelphia Sphas. He played in 20 games and averaged 3.3 points per contest. Wilmington would only finish with a 14–14 record the next year, but Auerbach played in all 28 of their games.

He spent two more seasons in the league playing for Paterson Crescents, but in neither season did the Crescents qualify for the playoffs. By the time he retired professional basketball, Auerbach had played for four teams: the Brooklyn Celtics (1941), Harrisburg Senators (1943), Wilmington Bombers (1943–45) and Paterson Crescents (1945–47).

== See also ==
- List of select Jewish basketball players
