= Jake Ahearn =

American basketball player (1918–1968)

Personal information
- Born: January 6, 1918 Brooklyn, New York, U.S.
- Died: February 17, 1968 (aged 50) Farmingdale, New York, U.S.
- Listed height: 6 ft 2 in (1.88 m)
- Listed weight: 185 lb (84 kg)

Career information
- College: St. John's (1939–1940)
- Position: Guard

Career history
- 1940–1941: Brooklyn Dodgers
- 1940–1942: Detroit Eagles
- 1941–1942: Saratoga Indians
- 1943–1944: Wilmington Blue Bombers
- 1945–1947: Baltimore Bullets

Career highlights
- ABL champion (1946)

John F. Ahearn Jr. (January 6, 1918 – February 17, 1968) was an American professional basketball player. He played for the Detroit Eagles in the National Basketball League (NBL) and averaged 5.3 points per game. He competed in several other leagues as well.

Ahearn is the cousin of Jerry Bush, who coincidentally also played college basketball at St. John's and then in the NBL.
