= Paul Chadick =

American basketball player (1918–1999)

Personal information
- Born: May 25, 1918 Wilmington, Delaware, U.S.
- Died: December 28, 1999 (aged 81) Seminole, Florida, U.S.
- Listed height: 5 ft 11 in (1.80 m)
- Listed weight: 175 lb (79 kg)

Career information
- High school: Wilmington (Wilmington, Delaware)
- College: Beacom (1936–1937); Saint Joseph's (1937–1939)
- Playing career: 1939–1951
- Position: Forward / guard

Career history
- 1939–1940: Amsterdam
- 1940–1941: General Chemical
- 1940–1941: Wilmington St. Hedwig Huskies
- 1940–1941: St. Paul's
- 1941–1942: Wilmington Blue Bombers
- 1941–1943: Sun Shipbuilding Company
- 1942: Milford Cardinals
- 1942–1943: Pusey & Jones
- 1942: Wilmington Y. M. C. A.
- 1943: St. Ann's
- 1943–1944: Wilmington Blue Bombers
- 1945–1947: Wilmington Blue Bombers
- 1946: Wilkes-Barre Barons
- 1947: Elizabeth Braves
- 1947–1948: Wilkes-Barre Barons
- 1948: Sunbury Mercuries
- 1948–1949: Trenton Tigers
- 1950: Lancaster Rockets
- 1950–1951: St. John's

Career highlights
- ABL champion (1944); ABL all-star (1947)

Paul Joseph Chadick (May 25, 1918 – December 28, 1999) was an American basketball player. From Wilmington, Delaware, he played college basketball at Beacom College and Saint Joseph's University before beginning a professional career.

Chadick began with a New York team in 1939 before playing for several local teams in the 1940–41 season, when he was the most valuable player of the Industrial Basketball League (IBL) and led his team to the league championship. After a brief stint with the Wilmington Blue Bombers of the American Basketball League (ABL) in 1941–42, he returned to local leagues.

Chadick won an IBL championship in 1942–43, a C. Y. O. Basketball League championship in 1943 and also a Delaware River Basketball League (Delri League) championship that year. He returned to the Blue Bombers for the 1943–44 season and helped them to the ABL championship. After a stint in the United States Marine Corps, Chadick returned to the team during the 1945–46 season and stayed in 1946–47, being named an ABL all-star in the latter season. He spent the 1947–48 season with three ABL teams and a team in the Eastern Basketball League (EBL), later returning to the ABL in 1948–49.

After missing a year due to injury, Chadick signed with an EBL team for the 1950–51 season before later returning to local ranks, where he concluded his career as a C. Y. O. League all-star despite being the oldest player in the league. Regarded as one of the greatest basketball players to come from Wilmington, he was inducted into the Delaware Sports Museum and Hall of Fame in 1984.

== Early life and college ==
Paul Joseph Chadick was born on May 25, 1918, in Wilmington, Delaware. Chadick first started playing basketball at the local Boy's Club. "They used to throw out about 15 balls on the court and I got a lot of practice," he later said. "The first team I ever played on was the Boy's Club Midgets–that was when I was about 12 or 13–and Elin Ostberg was the coach." However, his career was interrupted shortly afterwards. "My father had bought me a new red sweater and we were playing a game at the Boys' Club," Chadick said. "We had no lockers and after the game [and] I was unable to find it. When I returned home and told my father, he became so mad that he made me quit the club. The next year the club was moved to Elm and Jackson Streets, which was only about a block from my home, and I started to sneak around there again and play some basketball. After a time, my father learned I was going back to the club, but he didn't say anything about it." In 1935–36, he was a member of the Boy's Club Reapers team which won the junior and senior division championships in the Delaware State Tournament.

Chadick attended Wilmington High School and was unanimously voted basketball team captain in January 1936. The Morning News reported in February 1936 that "Two Eagle-eyed performers, Captain Paul Chadick and Danny DiPace, have featured the [Wilmington HS] Red Devils' attack. Chadick is unquestionably one of the most outstanding players ever to perform for Wilmington High. He has no peer as a shotmaker and is in the thick of every offensive assault. Chadick also directs High's famed passing attack in a manner that has brought praise from everyone who has seen the team."

Chadick enrolled at Beacom College in late 1936. He played one season in basketball and was a top player under coach John D. Naylor.

Chadick transferred to St. Joseph's University in Pennsylvania in 1937. He made the starting lineup, heralded as the "Mighty Mites," in his freshman season. He made his debut for the team in a 58–22 win over Loyola University Maryland and made two field goals and an assist. He played in the 1937–38 season and half of the 1938–39 season before leaving to enter the professional ranks.

== Professional career ==
Chadick started his professional basketball career with Amsterdam in the New York State League (NYSL), appearing in nine games and scoring 87 total points in the 1939–40 season. For the 1940–41 season, he returned to Delaware and played for the independent St. Hedwig's Huskies. He also was a player-coach that season for the General Chemical team of the Industrial Basketball League (IBL), leading them to a 5–0 start. The General Chemical team eventually made the league championship, where Chadick's "sensational long-range firing of field goals" helped them win the final game 42–39 against DuPont. In the game, which was the third and deciding match of the series, Chadick scored 19 points in what was described as "one of the most exciting and bitterly contested games of the season." The Journal-Every Evening reported that "all of his action arches were from a distance with no less than half of them coming from the dead center of the court." Chadick was named the league's most valuable player in a poll and was named to the all-star squad. League president P. Newton Pew said that "Chadick's selection on the [all-star] team honors not only the best player in the league but one of the finest gentlemen as well. Chadick never complains to officials, never displays unsportsmanlike, and is always a gentleman." He also played for St. Paul's in the Catholic Basketball League.

On November 24, 1941, Chadick was signed by the Wilmington Blue Bombers of the American Basketball League (ABL). In mid-December, it was announced that Chadick was lost for the remainder of the ABL season, as he was employed by the Sun Shipbuilding Co. which had a team in the Delaware River Basketball League (Delri League) that played on the same days as Wilmington. He stated that it was impossible for him to play for both teams at once. In the four games he played in with the Blue Bombers, Chadick gave "a good account of himself," according to the Journal-Every Evening. Wilmington eventually won the league championship. From January to February 1942, Chadick played for the Milford Cardinals in the Eastern Shore Basketball League (ESBL). In a game against the Laurel Merchants, Chadick scored 43 points. He finished the ESBL season fourth in the league in scoring with 202 points.

For the 1942–43 season, Chadick returned to the IBL and played for Pusey & Jones. Pusey & Jones eventually won the league championship in March, 57–37 against DuPont with Chadick scoring 12 points in the game. He also played for the Wilmington Y. M. C. A. basketball team. From January to April 1943, Chadick played for St. Ann's in the C. Y. O. Basketball League, leading them to the league championship against St. Thomas. In February, Chadick was named by league president Jim McGonegal as someone who would be on the Catholic League/C. Y. O. League all-time team. McGonegal also stated that the duo of Chadick and Bill McCahan on St. Ann's was the best combination in league history. Chadick additionally played with the Sun Ship team in the Delri League, leading them to the first half league championship. His play with Sun Ship led Chester Times journalist Bill Burks to write:

We have known it for a long time and so have most of you fans but we think it might be a good time to put it down in black and white. Paul Chadick is too good for the Delri League and is the main reason why Sun Ship has made shambles of competition by winning 23 of 24 games in two years of play. There are no players in the league who can match Chadick in all around ability, condition and competitive spirit. It is possible that Sun Ship could win the league without Paul, but the Robertshaw machine is a double-barrelled cinch with Chadick in harness. The Shippers have a clever assortment of court talent but the Wilmington whirlwind is like Joe DiMaggio with the Yankees—he is the extra punch that wins titles. It would benefit the league if Chadick was to retire. Possibly the second half struggle might result in a wide open scrap involving several teams, and this would be a tonic for the fans and the competitors. But it would be unfair to Chadick who has a perfect right to play. The fans like to watch peppery Paul, but unfortunately he makes the other lads look bad.

Sun Ship eventually won the league championship game 44–40 against Ford Local, with two field goals made in the final minute by Chadick.

In October 1943, Chadick tried out for the Wilmington Blue Bombers of the ABL. He made the team and scored their first points in the season opener, a win against the Brooklyn Indians. In November, Journal-Every Evening journalist Dick Rinard wrote that "Paul Chadick has proven to any skeptics who may have doubted his big league caliber that he can go in any competition." By the end of 1943, he was tied with Ed Sadowski for the team lead in scoring, with a newspaper writing that he "totalled[sic] only three points in the first three games of the season but has been banging them in steadily from the field since the fourth game." Chadick helped the team make the league championship round, where they went 4–3 against the Philadelphia Sphas to capture the ABL title. In the championship series, Chadick scored 57 points, only behind teammate Moe Frankel (who scored 66) for the lead.

After the season ended, Chadick was accepted by the United States Marine Corps to serve in World War II, which caused him to miss the 1944–45 season. In October 1945, he wrote a letter to the Blue Bombers manager stating he was in Japan but hoped to return to Wilmington "before too much snow falls. While in Japan, he also played "quite a bit of basketball," according to The Morning News. He left Japan on December 4, 1945, and came to San Diego, California, on December 25. He was given honorable discharge from the Marine Corps on January 7, 1946, and arrived in Wilmington on January 16. He had served overseas for 14 months. Upon returning to Delaware, Chadick signed with the Blue Bombers, making his return against the New York Gothams on January 20. In his first game back, Chadick appeared as a substitute and scored two points. A week later, against the Philadelphia Sphas on January 27, Chadick led the team with 20 points scored. With Wilmington in the 1945–46 season, he appeared in a total of 17 games and scored 174 points. After Wilmington was eliminated in the playoffs, Chadick signed with the Wilkes-Barre Barons of the Penn State League. He was a replacement for Wilkes-Barre's leading scorer, Jack "Rocco" Hogan, who had suffered an injury.

Chadick returned to the Blue Bombers for the 1946–47 season and was named team captain following the October workouts. On November 22, against the Trenton Tigers, he scored the game-winning shot with 10 seconds left to play to win 53–52. By December 13, Chadick was third in the ABL scoring with 147 points in 11 games, only behind Saul Cohen (173) and Bobby Dorn (155). He finished the season with 35 games played, 166 field goals and 71 free throws made for a total of 403 points. After the season ended, Chadick was named to the ABL all-star team.

Chadick was signed by the Elizabeth Braves of the ABL in November 1947. In December, he requested a release, after not playing in any games, and subsequently signed with the Wilkes-Barre Barons of the ABL. He was released by Wilkes-Barre in January 1948. Afterwards, he played in the Eastern Basketball League (EBL) for the Sunbury Mercuries. He appeared in 7 games for the team, recording 55 points scored. In March, Chadick was signed back into the ABL by the Trenton Tigers. Trailing 65–77 in the fourth period against the Philadelphia Sphas, Chadick scored four field goals and sparked a rally that won the game for Trenton 87–84. He ended the season with a 4.57 point average in 23 games played between Wilkes-Barre and Trenton. He scored a total of 105 points in the ABL season, with 41 field goals and 23 free throws made.

Chadick returned to Trenton for the 1948–49 season. He played in 13 games for Trenton before a ruptured disk in his back led to him missing the rest of the season. "I was virtually helpless," Chadick said. "I could hardly bend. It was so bad that my wife had to help me dress and undress. And even after the operation, which required a six-inch gash, I thought I'd never play again." In the games he did play in that season, Chadick recorded 42 field goals and 31 free throws for a total of 115 points. An October 1949 article in the Journal-Every Evening stated that "some basketball observers" rated Chadick as "the best player ever developed in Wilmington." He missed the 1949–50 season as a result of his injury, although he did take part in a benefit game with the Wilmington All-Stars. At the beginning of the 1950–51 season, Chadick received permission from doctors to play and signed with the Lancaster Rockets of the EBL. His release was later reported on December 1. Shortly afterwards, he returned to Delaware and joined the St. John's team in the CYO League. In his first game with St. John's, Chadick scored 15 points and led the team to a 54–38 win over St. Paul's. By December 15, Chadick was second in the league scoring with 147 points on 56 field goals and 35 free throws. At 32 years old, Chadick was the oldest player in the league but was still described as being "as good as ever." Butch Bailey, who played with Chadick on St. Paul's in 1940–41 and was at the time the St. Paul's coach, said "Paul is as good a basketball player now as he ever was. He's still a hustler, still aggressive and still a great shotmaker. He's lost some of his speed, but he more than makes up for this with his experience. Except for last season, when he didn't play, I would say Paul was one of the best five players in the city in each of the last 15 years. He's always had it." On December 27, he was selected a CYO Major League All-Star. Chadick scored 18 points for the All-Stars (leading the team) in an exhibition against St. Mary's, helping them win 58–50 in a game that benefited the Delaware Day School for Handicapped Children transportation fund. In February 1951, he was selected to the Delaware All-Star basketball team that played against the Harlem Aces. Chadick led St. John's to a third-place finish in the CYO League. St. John's was entered after the CYO season to the Delaware senior basketball tournament, where they advanced through the quarter-finals before being eliminated by Kappa Alpha.

== Later life and death ==
Chadick finished his career as "one of the great home-grown players in Wilmington history." He retired following the 1950–51 season and became a coach for the Jewish Community Center basketball team a few years later. In 1974, Chadick moved from Wilmington to Seminole, Florida, where he served 18 years as manager of a liquor store and operated a sporting goods shop. He was inducted into the Delaware Sports Museum and Hall of Fame in 1984.

Chadick was married and had five children: two sons and three daughters. His sons, Mike and Paul Jr., played high school baseball at Salesianum School. Chadick died on December 28, 1999, at the age of 81, in Seminole, Florida.
