= Bob Tough =

American basketball player

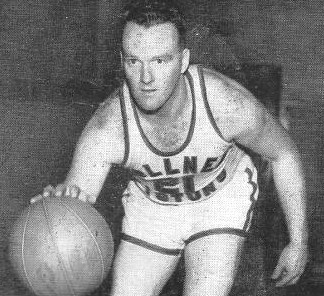
- Tough as a member of the Fort Wayne Pistons

Personal information
- Born: August 28, 1920 New York City, New York, U.S.
- Died: April 7, 1999 (aged 78)
- Listed height: 6 ft 0 in (1.83 m)
- Listed weight: 185 lb (84 kg)

Career information
- High school: Jamaica (Queens, New York)
- College: St. John's (1940–1942)
- Playing career: 1943–1951
- Position: Guard / forward
- Number: 20, 7, 3

Career history
- 1943–1944: Brooklyn Indians
- 1944–1946: Trenton Tigers
- 1945–1949: Fort Wayne (Zollner) Pistons
- 1949: Baltimore Bullets
- 1949–1950: Waterloo Hawks
- 1950: Cohoes Marras
- 1950–1951: Kansas City Hi-Spots
- Stats at NBA.com
- Stats at Basketball Reference

Robert Tough, known also as "Red", (born August 28, 1920 – April 7, 1999) was an American professional basketball player. He spent two seasons in the National Basketball Association (NBA). He played as a member of the Fort Wayne Pistons in the final season of the Basketball Association of America (BAA) before it was folded into the NBA. During Tough's second season he played for two teams, the Baltimore Bullets and the Waterloo Hawks. Before playing professional basketball, Tough attended St. John's University.

== BAA/NBA career statistics ==
Legend
GP	Games played	FG%	Field-goal percentage
FT%	Free-throw percentage	APG	Assists per game
PPG	Points per game	**Bold**	Career high

=== Regular season ===
Year	Team	GP	FG%	FT%	APG	PPG
1948–49	Fort Wayne	**53**	.277	.725	**1.9**	**8.8**
1949–50	Baltimore	8	**.282**	**.833**	.3	3.4
1949–50	Waterloo	21	.281	.647	1.7	4.1
Career		82	.278	.713	1.7	7.1
