= Stan Szukala =

American basketball player

Personal information
- Born: June 12, 1918
- Died: August 30, 2003 (aged 85) Park Ridge, Illinois, U.S.
- Listed height: 6 ft 1 in (1.85 m)
- Listed weight: 175 lb (79 kg)

Career information
- High school: Carl Schurz (Chicago, Illinois)
- College: DePaul (1937–1940)
- Playing career: 1940–1947
- Position: Guard

Career history
- 1940–1942: Chicago Bruins
- 1945–1947: Chicago American Gears

Career highlights
- NBL champion (1947); 2× Second-team All-American – MSG (1939, 1940)

Stanley Szukala (June 12, 1918 – October 30, 2003) was an American basketball player. He was an All-American college player at DePaul University and played for four seasons in the American National Basketball League (NBL), a forerunner to the National Basketball Association (NBA). He was a member of the 1947 NBL champion Chicago American Gears, playing alongside future Hall of Fame center George Mikan. He also would become the head coach for the Grand Rapids Rangers within the short-lived Professional Basketball League of America. Not only that, but during that brief period of time, he would enlist the future 38th President of the United States, Gerald Ford, as a business manager to the team to operate next to Szukala during his brief time as head coach for the Rangers.
