= Frido Frey =

German basketball player

Personal information
- Born: October 26, 1921 Germany
- Died: May 16, 2000 (aged 78)
- Listed height: 6 ft 2 in (1.88 m)
- Listed weight: 195 lb (88 kg)

Career information
- High school: New Utrecht (Brooklyn, New York)
- College: LIU Brooklyn (1941–1942)
- Position: Forward
- Number: 4

Career history
- 1945–1946: New York Gothams
- 1946–1947: Brooklyn Gothams
- 1947: New York Knicks
- 1947–1949: Paterson Crescents
- 1949: Brooklyn Gothams
- Stats at NBA.com
- Stats at Basketball Reference

Frido Frey (October 26, 1921 – May 16, 2000) was a German professional basketball player. A 6'2" forward, he was the first German player in the National Basketball Association (then the Basketball Association of America).

Frey attended New Utrecht High School in Brooklyn, where he served as captain of his basketball team. Art Modell described him as "one of the best high-school basketball players in the city". Frey then played basketball at Long Island University during the 1941–42 season, and with the Manhattan Beach Coast Guard. He played 23 regular season games for the New York Knicks during the 1946–47 BAA season and scored 88 points.

== BAA career statistics ==
Legend
| GP | Games played |
| FG% | Field-goal percentage |
| FT% | Free-throw percentage |
| APG | Assists per game |
| PPG | Points per game |

=== Regular season ===
| Year | Team | GP | FG% | FT% | APG | PPG |
|---|---|---|---|---|---|---|
| 1946–47 | New York | 23 | .289 | .571 | .6 | 3.8 |
| Career | | 23 | .289 | .571 | .6 | 3.8 |

=== Playoffs ===
| Year | Team | GP | FG% | FT% | APG | PPG |
|---|---|---|---|---|---|---|
| 1946–47 | New York | 5 | .158 | .364 | 1.4 | 2.0 |
| Career | | 5 | .158 | .364 | 1.4 | 2.0 |
