= John Murphy (basketball) =

American basketball and baseball player

Personal information
- Born: September 13, 1924 Philadelphia, Pennsylvania, U.S.
- Died: January 29, 2003 (aged 78) Philadelphia, Pennsylvania, U.S.
- Listed height: 6 ft 2 in (1.88 m)
- Listed weight: 175 lb (79 kg)

Career information
- High school: Simon Gratz (Philadelphia, Pennsylvania)
- Playing career: 1944–1948
- Position: Forward
- Number: 12, 9

Career history
- 1944–1947: Wilmington Bombers
- 1946: Philadelphia Warriors
- 1946–1947: New York Knicks
- 1947–1948: Lancaster Roses
- Stats at NBA.com
- Stats at Basketball Reference

John Francis "Moe" Murphy (September 13, 1924 – January 29, 2003) was an American professional basketball and baseball player. Murphy was born in Philadelphia, Pennsylvania and attended Simon Gratz High School, where he led the Philadelphia Public League in points per game with 13.7 in 1942. He spent three seasons playing for the Wilmington Bombers of the American Basketball League (ABL) and briefly embarked on a baseball career with the Cincinnati Reds' Triple-A team. Murphy played for one season in the Basketball Association of America (BAA) with the Philadelphia Warriors and New York Knicks. He returned to the ABL for the 1947–48 season when he played for the Lancaster Roses. Murphy also played for the Philadelphia Sphas.

After his retirement from playing, he worked in the bakery of an Acme Markets store in Philadelphia.

== BAA career statistics ==
Legend
GP	Games played	FG%	Field-goal percentage
FT%	Free-throw percentage	APG	Assists per game
PPG	Points per game	**Bold**	Career high

=== Regular season ===
Year	Team	GP	FG%	FT%	APG	PPG
1946–47	Philadelphia	**11**	.200	**.667**	.0	.7
1946–47	New York	9	**.320**	**.667**	.0	**2.7**
Career		20	.275	.667	.0	1.6
