= 1944 World Professional Basketball Tournament =

World Professional Basketball Tournament
- 1944

Tournament information
- Location: Chicago, Illinois
- Dates: 20 March–24 March
- Venue: Chicago Stadium
- Teams: 14

Final positions
- Champions: Fort Wayne Zollner Pistons
- 1st runner-up: Brooklyn Eagles
- 2nd runner-up: Harlem Globetrotters
- MVP: Bobby McDermott

The 1944 World Professional Basketball Tournament was the sixth edition of the World Professional Basketball Tournament. It was held in Chicago, Illinois, during the days of 20–24 March 1944 and featured 14 teams, with the teams mostly independently run teams alongside the teams that were from the National Basketball League at the time and also the former American Basketball League's Brooklyn Eagles, which was composed of star players from the ABL. Entering the tournament, the NBL's Fort Wayne Zollner Pistons (who had likely already won that league's championship earlier on) were slated to win the entire event, despite them competing against the New York Renaissance, who were competing as themselves after their players participated in last year's event as the Washington Bears, in the semifinal event. The Globetrotters advanced past the Oshkosh All-Stars in the quarterfinals in a contest officially recorded as a 41–31 Harlem victory, though the Fort Wayne News-Sentinel reported the game was in fact declared a 2–0 forfeit in Harlem’s favor after a series of fights within the final six minutes escalated to the point that police became involved, prompting Oshkosh head coach Lon Darling to withdraw his team. The Zollner Pistons would end up stunning the Renaissance with a close 42–38 victory in Fort Wayne's favor, while the ABL's Brooklyn squad ended up upsetting the Harlem Globetrotters in their semifinal match with a 63–41 blowout victory due to their fast-paced action. Ultimately, the championship match was won by the Fort Wayne Zollner Pistons for the first time in the franchise's history alongside the NBL championship, who defeated the ABL's based Brooklyn Eagles 50–33 in the championship game in what ultimately became the best performance for an ABL team in a WPBT event. The Harlem Globetrotters came in third after beating the New York Renaissance 37–29 in the third-place game. Bobby McDermott of Fort Wayne was named the tournament's Most Valuable Player.

== Results ==
=== Bracket ===
Round 1
Dayton Aviators	52
Akron Collegians	38
New York Renaissance	39
Detroit Suffrins	33
Cleveland Chase Brassmen	55
Indianapolis Pure Oils	52
Brooklyn Eagles	55
Camp Campbell Tankmen	41
Harlem Globetrotters	41
Pittsburgh Corbetts	40
Oshkosh All-Stars	51
Rochester Wings	40

Quarterfinals
Fort Wayne Zollner Pistons	59
Dayton Aviators	34
New York Renaissance	62
Cleveland Chase Brassmen	38
Brooklyn Eagles	49
Sheboygan Red Skins	43
Harlem Globetrotters	41
Oshkosh All-Stars	31

Semifinals
Fort Wayne Zollner Pistons	42
New York Renaissance	38
Brooklyn Eagles	63
Harlem Globetrotters	41

Final
Fort Wayne Zollner Pistons	50
Brooklyn Eagles	33
Third place
Harlem Globetrotters	37
New York Renaissance	29

=== Semi-finals ===
23 March 1944

Box score and recap

Brooklyn Eagles 63, Harlem Globetrotters 41
Pts: B. Tough – 32	Pts: B. Pressley – 12

Chicago Stadium
Attendance: 10,428
Referees: Nat Messinger, Steve Barak

23 March 1944

Box score and recap

Fort Wayne Zollner Pistons 42, New York Renaissance 38
Pts: B. McDermott, J. Bush – 9	Pts: P. Bell – 14

Chicago Stadium
Attendance: 10,428
Referees: Nat Messinger, Dutch Kriznecky

=== Third place game ===
24 March 1944
8:15 p.m.

Box score and recap

Harlem Globetrotters 37, New York Renaissance 29
Pts: D. Cumberland – 10	Pts: Sonny Wood – 8

Chicago Stadium
Attendance: 14,226

=== Championship game ===
24 March 1945
9:15 p.m.

Box score and recap

Fort Wayne Zollner Pistons 50, Brooklyn Eagles 33
Scoring by quarter: 12–9, 16–2, 14–10, 8–12
Pts: J. Pelkington – 19	Pts: B. Tough, B. Opper – 11

Chicago Stadium
Attendance: 14,226
Referees: Nat Messenger, Dutch Kriznecky

== Individual awards ==
- Bob Tough of the independently ran Brooklyn Eagles led this tournament in scoring with 71 points scored in four games played.

=== All-Tournament First Team ===
- F - Sonny Wood, New York Renaissance
- F - Mel Riebe, Cleveland Chase Brassmen
- C - Blackie Towery, Fort Wayne Zollner Pistons
- G - Mickey Rottner, Brooklyn Eagles
- G - Bobby McDermott, Fort Wayne Zollner Pistons (MVP)

=== All-Tournament Second Team ===
- F - Jerry Bush, Fort Wayne Zollner Pistons
- F - Bob Tough, Brooklyn Eagles
- C - Bernie Price, Harlem Globetrotters
- G - Jack Garfinkel, Brooklyn Eagles
- G - Manny Hyatt, Pittsburgh Corbetts

== Notable occurrences ==
- On 21 March, with three minutes remaining in the quarter-finals match between the Harlem Globetrotters and the Oshkosh All-Stars, a fight broke out between the players which needed officials and police to restore order. Thirty seconds after play resumed, trouble broke out again and Oshkosh coach Lon Darling decided to call his team from the game.
- On 23 March, Bob Tough of the Brooklyn Eagles tied a tournament record previously set by Sonny Boswell of the New York Renaissance in 1942 and would later last until 1948 with his 32 points scored against the Harlem Globetrotters in the semifinal round.

== See also ==
- 1943–44 National Basketball League (United States) season, a professional basketball season featuring all four of the competing teams there, including the NBL (and eventual WPBT) champions in the Fort Wayne Zollner Pistons
- 1943–44 Brooklyn Indians / Eagles season, a professional basketball season involving a former team from the revived version of the original American Basketball League in the Brooklyn Indians (as they were known during their time in the ABL) before becoming the Brooklyn Eagles for the rest of that season going forward, including for this tournament
