= Bill McKeever =

American football player (1916–2000)

- McKeever with Los Angeles in 1942

No. 97, 61
- Position: Tackle

Personal information
- Born: October 29, 1918
- Died: July 8, 2000 (aged 81)
- Listed height: 6 ft 2 in (1.88 m)
- Listed weight: 210 lb (95 kg)

Career information
- High school: Episcopal Academy (PA)
- College: Cornell
- NFL draft: 1939: 10th round, 84th overall pick

Career history
- Philadelphia Eagles (1939)*; Los Angeles Bulldogs (1942)
- * Offseason or practice squad member only

Awards and highlights
- First-team All-American (1938); First-team All-Eastern (1938); Cornell Athletics Hall of Fame (1978)

Career PCFL statistics
- Games played: 4

William Winton McKeever Jr. (29 October 1918 – July 8, 2000) was an American football tackle who played one season for the Los Angeles Bulldogs of the Pacific Coast Football League (PCFL). He played college football for Cornell and was selected in the tenth round (84th overall) of the 1939 NFL draft by the Philadelphia Eagles.

== Early life and education ==
McKeever was born in 1918, and attended Episcopal Academy in Pennsylvania, graduating in 1935. After graduating he joined Cornell University in New York, being one of the top freshman players. He made the varsity team the following season, and was given a letter. In the first seven games of the 1936 season, McKeever was a starter in all but one of them. He was a top player on the Cornell team, and earned letters in each of his three seasons on the varsity squad. McKeever was named first-team All-American by Grantland Rice following the 1938 season. He was an inductee into the school's hall of fame in 1978.

McKeever was also an accomplished hammer thrower in track and field, placing 3rd at the 1939 USA Outdoor Track and Field Championships in that event.

== Professional career ==
After graduating from college, McKeever was selected in the tenth round (84th overall) of the 1939 NFL draft by the Philadelphia Eagles, though he did not play. After being out of football for three seasons, he signed with the Los Angeles Bulldogs of the Pacific Coast Football League (PCFL) in 1942. He appeared in four total games with the Bulldogs.

== Personal life ==
His father, Bill Sr., was a starter on the 1897 Cornell team and was a team captain.
