= Harrisburg Senators (basketball) =

American basketball team

Harrisburg Senators
Founded
1942
1947
League
ABL 1942–1943
EPBL 1947–1951

1952–1953

Arena
Madrid Palestra 1942–1943; 1947–1948

Zembo Mosque 1948–1951
Madrid Palestra 1952–1953

Team History
Harrisburg Senators
1942–1943
1947–1951
Harrisburg Caps
1950–1951
1952–1953
Championships
none
Division titles
none

The Harrisburg Senators were an American basketball team based in Harrisburg, Pennsylvania, that was originally formed as a member of the American Basketball League, where it played for one season.

From 1947 to 1951, the Harrisburg Senators played in the Eastern Professional Basketball League. Without a true basketball arena available at the time, the Senators split their games between the Madrid Palestra and the Zembo Mosque, two buildings that were large enough to hold a court and bleachers. During that time, the team's leading scorer was Joe Cackovic. The franchise reached the EPBL finals in both the 1948–49 and 1949–50 seasons.

== Change from Harrisburg Senators to Harrisburg Caps ==
The Senators had trouble filling the huge Zembo Mosque during the 1950–51 season, and visiting teams complained that the basketball floor at the mosque was often waxed for dance halls, and that the Senators applied rosin on their shoes to countermand the slippery surface. The franchise folded midway through the 1950–51 season and was replaced by another franchise, the Harrisburg Caps, who finished out the Senators' season. After sitting out the 1951–52 season, the Caps returned to the EPBL and played their home games at the Madrid Palestra. The 1952–53 Caps' lineup was strengthened by the addition of four players from the Fort Indiantown Gap, Pennsylvania Army base, who played for both the military team and for the Caps. But with the season winding down and the Caps mistakenly believing they had been eliminated from the playoffs, the Fort Indiantown Gap players quit the team and the Caps were forced to use semipro hoopsters to finish out the final two contests.

== Year-by-year ==
=== Harrisburg Senators, ABL ===
Year	League	Reg. season	Playoffs
1942/43	ABL	4th	Did not qualify

=== Harrisburg Senators, EPBL ===
Year	League	Record	Reg. season	Playoffs
1947/48	EPBL	11–16	6th	Did not qualify
1948/49	EPBL	18–10	tied, 1st lost post-season tiebreaker	Finals
1949/50	EPBL	16–12	2nd, Southern	Finals
1950/51	EPBL	folded in mid-season		

=== Harrisburg Caps, EPBL ===
Year	League	Record	Reg. season	Playoffs
1950/51	EPBL	9–18	3rd, Southern combined Senators and Caps records	Did not qualify
1952/53	EPBL	7–12	5th	Did not qualify
