= Ben Goldfaden =

American basketball player (1913–2013)

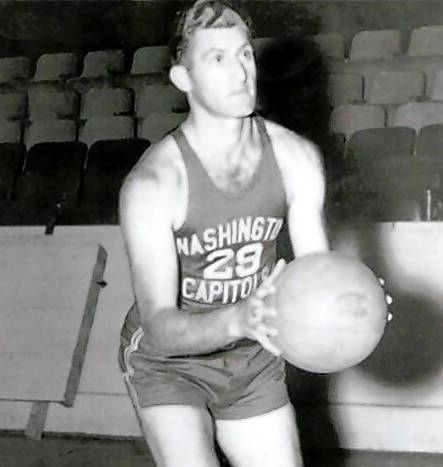
- Goldfaden with the Washington Capitols in 1946

Personal information
- Born: September 6, 1913
- Died: March 25, 2013 (aged 99) Tavares, Florida, U.S.
- Listed height: 6 ft 1 in (1.85 m)
- Listed weight: 185 lb (84 kg)

Career information
- High school: South Side (Newark, New Jersey)
- College: George Washington (1934–1937)
- Playing career: 1938–1947
- Position: Forward

Career history
- 1938–1942: Washington Brewers
- 1942–1943: Philadelphia Sphas
- 1943–1945: Wilmington Bombers
- 1945–1946: Trenton Tigers
- 1946: Washington Capitols
- 1946–1947: Trenton Tigers

Career highlights
- 2× ABL champion (1943, 1944)
- Stats at NBA.com
- Stats at Basketball Reference

Benjamin Paul Goldfaden (September 6, 1913 – March 25, 2013) was an American professional basketball player. He played two games in the Basketball Association of America (BAA) as a member of the Washington Capitols during the 1946–47 season. Goldfaden spent most of his professional career playing in the American Basketball League.

Goldfaden began playing basketball in Detroit during his early years due to his height. He attended South Side High School in Newark, New Jersey, where he was an all-state team selection in 1933. Goldfaden was so highly recruited during his teenage years that he was pursued by Catholic and other sectarian prep schools despite that he was Jewish. He was paid to play for barnstorming teams in exhibition games as a 16-year-old that would have marred his amateur status and disqualified him from playing college basketball. Goldfaden played collegiately for the George Washington Colonials on an athletic scholarship.

Goldfaden quit playing basketball at the age of 33 to become a physical education teacher as its salary of US$2,000 ($33,020 adjusted for inflation) was better than his basketball career. He worked 20 years as an agent for Massachusetts Mutual Life Insurance and served as a city recreation director in Maryland. Goldfaden died of congestive heart failure, aged 99, in Tavares, Florida. He was believed to be the oldest living former National Basketball Association (NBA) player at the time of his death.

== BAA career statistics ==
Legend
GP	Games played
FG%	Field-goal percentage
FT%	Free-throw percentage
APG	Assists per game
PPG	Points per game

=== Regular season ===
Year	Team	GP	FG%	FT%	APG	PPG
1946–47	Washington	2	.000	.500	.0	1.0
Career		2	.000	.500	.0	1.0
