= New York Americans (ABL) =

American basketball team based in New York, New York

The New York Americans were an American basketball team based in New York, New York that was a member of the American Basketball League.

The owners were "Martin L. Cohen and Phillip Fox & Associates"

== Year-by-year ==
Year	League	Reg. season	Playoffs	Ref
1943/44	ABL	2nd (1st half); 4th (2nd half)	Did not qualify	
