= Brooklyn Gothams =

American basketball team

- Game: Basketball
- League: American Basketball League
- Team history: New York Gothams (1945-1946); Westchester Indians (until 1945)
- Based in: Brooklyn, New York, USA

The Brooklyn Gothams were an American basketball team based in Brooklyn, New York that was a member of the American Basketball League.

The team was originally called the Westchester Indians and was based in White Plains, New York. They relocated to Brooklyn, New York and became the New York Gothams on January 20, 1945. They settled on the name Brooklyn Gothams at the end of the 1945/1946 season.

== Year-by-year ==
Year	League	Reg. season	Playoffs
1944/45	ABL	5th	Did not qualify
1945/46	ABL	3rd	Did not qualify
1946/47	ABL	1st, Northern	1st Round
1947/48	ABL	7th	Did not qualify
1948/49	ABL	7th	Did not qualify
