= Camden Indians =

American basketball team

The Camden Indians were a short-lived American basketball team based in Camden, New Jersey, that was a member of the American Basketball League for part of the 1942-43 season.

The franchise started its life as the Wilmington Blue Bombers, and played the 1941-42 season. The team started the 1942-43 season in Camden as the Camden Indians, but only played four games (going 3-1) before transferring to Brooklyn and playing the rest of the season as the Brooklyn Indians, going 1-5.

== Year-by-year ==
Year	League	Reg. season	Playoffs
1942/43	ABL	3-1 (as Camden); 1-5 (as Brooklyn)	N/A
