= Brooklyn Indians =

Basketball team

The Brooklyn Indians were an American basketball team based in Brooklyn, New York that was a member of the American Basketball League.

The team was previously known as the Camden Indians. The team moved to Brooklyn during the 1942/43 season on 18 January 1943. They finished that season in third. The team dropped out during the 1st half of the 1943/44 season. Despite their sudden exit from the ABL in early 1944, they would rebrand themselves as the Brooklyn Eagles for the World Professional Basketball Tournament in 1944, with the Brooklyn squad surprisingly going all the way to the championship round (upsetting teams like the Sheboygan Red Skins of the National Basketball League (a rivaling league to the American Basketball League at the time) and the world famous independent Harlem Globetrotters, the latter being in blowout fashion)) before being defeated 50–33 by the NBL's champion team that year, the Fort Wayne Zollner Pistons (now known as the Detroit Pistons) of the National Basketball League in the championship match. Their runner-up placement that year would turn out to be the most successful results of any ABL-adjacent team that competed in the WPBT when the event happened from 1939 until 1948.

== Year-by-year ==
Year	League	Reg. season	Playoffs
1942/43	ABL	3rd	Did not qualify
1943/44	ABL	5th (1st half)	N/A
