= Wilmington Bombers =

The Wilmington Blue Bombers were an American basketball team based in Wilmington, Delaware. They were a member of the American Basketball League.

== Year-by-year ==
Year	League	GP	W	L	Pct.	Reg. season	Playoffs
1941/42	ABL	25	18	7	.720	1st (1st half); 1st (2nd half)	Champion (no playoff)
1943/44	ABL	26	17	9	.654	1st (1st half); 3rd (2nd half)	Champion
1944/45	ABL	28	14	14	.500	3rd	Playoffs
1945/46	ABL	34	15	19	.441	4th	Playoffs
1946/47	ABL	33	13	20	.394	5th, Southern	Did not qualify

== See also ==
- Delaware Stars
- Wilmington Jets
- List of professional sports teams in Delaware
