= 1927–28 Brooklyn Visitations season =

- League: Metropolitan Basketball League (original)
- Head coach: John Donlon
- General manager: John Donlon
- Owner(s): Unknown (John Donlon?)
- Arena: Grand Prospect Hall

Results
- Record: 9–6 (.600)
- Place: Conference: 3rd
- Playoff finish: Did not qualify (Left the MBL for the rivaling ABL on January 3, 1928 in order to replace the Washington Palace Five team there.)

1927–28 Brooklyn Visitations season
- League: American Basketball League (original)
- Head coach: John Donlon
- General manager: John Donlon
- Owner(s): Unknown (John Donlon? George Preston Marshall?)
- Arena: Grand Prospect Hall

Results
- Record: 18–11 (.621)
- Place: Division: 2nd/3rd (Eastern)
- Playoff finish: Did not qualify (Team's official record was 25–26 due to them being merged with the dropped out Washington Palace Five franchise during this season.)

The 1927–28 Brooklyn Visitations season was their seventh professional basketball season in Brooklyn, New York, their seventh and final season played in the (original version of the) Metropolitan Basketball League, and their first season played in what would be the third season of existence for the American Basketball League, which was the first professional basketball league that had truly attempted to go fully national after previous professional basketball leagues were mostly regional at the time. When the Visitations entered what would end up becoming the final season of the (original version of the) Metropolitan Basketball League, the MBL would desperately add a bunch of new teams into their previously shortened up league with the Albany Senators from Albany, New York; the Catskill Howitzers from Catskill, New York; the Hudson Club (who didn't officially have a proper team name found for some unknown reason) from Hudson, New York; the Troy Trojans from Troy, New York; and the Paterson Pats from Paterson, New Jersey replacing the Paterson Crescents to create the newly-reformed seven team league that went alongside the already established Brooklyn Visitations (who were the only remaining long-standing team by this point in time) and Kingston Colonials from Kingston, New York from the previous season. However, the MBL's final season of existence would see some serious problems within almost immediately upon its beginning, as despite the Paterson Pats defeating the Kingston Colonials 33–14 on November 5, 1927 and the Hudson Club 24–17 on December 15, 1927 in convincing manners when they played matches against them (though one of those matches would be considered an exhibition match while the other match would be considered an official MBL match properly), the Paterson Pats would end up leaving the league days later on November 8, 1927 (though it's also slated they left on December 15, 1927 instead) with Paterson's general manager Joe Murray believing his team was too good for the rest of the competition (though that game would end up being counted as a loss by the MBL instead due to protests by the opposing team involving the Pats utilizing John Beckman from the Detroit Cardinals / Olympians in the rivaling American Basketball League as a part of their roster for that game). While the MBL would try to remain afloat within itself by utilizing only six teams for the rest of the season once again going forward, the Visitations themselves would end up getting a call from the bigger, stronger, and technically rivaling American Basketball League to join their league as the replacement team for the Washington Palace Five team that dropped out of the league on January 3, 1928 alongside the Detroit Cardinals / Olympians, ironically enough, though the Visitations' stipulation on joining the ABL would involve them taking on the spot previously held by the Washington Palace Five (sometimes referred to as the Laundrymen as a more proper team name due to the Palace Five name being a shorthand for George Preston Marshall's local Washington Palace Laundry laundromat business) and having the 7–15 record of the Washington, D.C. team be a part of the Visitations for the rest of their ABL season since their joining would be seen more as like a merger between the two teams from the different leagues by comparison. As such, the Visitations' own exit from the Metropolitan Basketball League would be seen as the final curtain call of sorts for the original MBL's run, as they would end their regular season period ten days later on January 14, though the Kingston Colonials and Catskill Howitzers (the two best teams of the MBL by that point in time) would host what might be considered as an impromptu best-of-three championship series to determine the final champions of that league's existence for the month of February, with Kingston ultimately sweeping the young Catskill franchise to win the final championship in the MBL's original history.

When the Visitations entered the bigger and better ran American Basketball League near what could be considered as the halfway point of their season, they would enter a league where no cages or double dribbling would be allowed since the ABL would utilize a mixture of professional basketball rules from the past and rules that would fit the Amateur Athletic Union of the time. Not only that, but they would also enter the league under an inherent disadvantage throughout the remainder of the ABL's season (which would be done in a proper regular season format as opposed to the more regular split season formatting that both the MBL and the ABL had implemented in the past), with the Visitations entering a four team Eastern Division (in a time that featured the defending ABL champion Original Celtics, the Philadelphia Warriors, and the Rochester Centrals as the surviving teams there after the Washington Palace Five folded operations and technically merged operations with the Brooklyn Visitations) as the last place team there in a time when the Western Division would only have three teams remaining on their ends (the Chicago Bruins, the Cleveland Rosenblums, and the Fort Wayne Hoosiers following the removal of the Detroit Cardinals / Olympians) and that division's playoff teams were already essentially confirmed earlier on due to the Bruins easily being the worst team in that division. Despite entering the ABL under such significant disadvantages, however, the revamped Brooklyn Visitations following their technical merger with the Washington Palace Five team previous owned by future Washington Redskins NFL team owner George Preston Marshall (due to them acquiring four of the players from the Palace Five squad) would end up improving the overall record that the previous Laundrymen team had by putting up an 18–11 record for the rest of the season, which helped improve the team's spot during this season. If the Visitations would have entered the ABL's season with the 18–11 record that they had gotten on their own accord in the end, they would have not only moved up from the Rochester Centrals in the Eastern Division, but also stolen second place in the division away from the Philadelphia Warriors to qualify for the ABL Playoffs against the 40–9 Original Celtics due to their overall win percentage being better by comparison. However, because the Visitations entered this ABL season as a continuation of the Washington Palace Five team that left the league near the start of the 1928 year, the Palace Five turned Visitations franchise would ultimately not qualify for the ABL's playoffs in the end due to them officially finishing the season in third place with a below-average 25–26 record that showcased the deficit that the Washington franchise gave to Brooklyn was ultimately too big of a hindrance to overcome in the end for the new Brooklyn franchise that would enter the ABL as the official replacements for the Palace Five squad. However, this would be the only season where the Brooklyn Visitations would be limited in the ABL by utilizing another team's record as a disadvantage on their ends, as going forward for the rest of their history as a franchise, the Visitations would be competing under their own names only going forward (outside of one brief moment in 1936 where the team briefly moved to Paterson, New Jersey to become the Paterson Visitations for a bit of time instead).

== Roster ==
Due to information on older professional basketball leagues being generally hard (if not outright impossible these days) to find for players from leagues like the "original" Metropolitan Basketball League and the American Basketball League (the latter league to a lesser extent by comparison to the former league in question), there are bound to be more gaps and/or inaccuracies found in certain areas on the team's roster spots than usual. Not only that, but this roster would be listing out the combined rosters held within both the "original" Metropolitan Basketball League and the American Basketball League during this season only.

1927–28 Brooklyn Visitations roster
Players

Pos.	No.	Player	Height	Weight	DOB	From
C		Cliff Anderson	6 ft 4 in (1.93 m)	180 lb (82 kg)	1903-03-02	CCNY
F/C		Mike Arrasate	6 ft 3 in (1.91 m)	205 lb (93 kg)	1904-07-11	No college
F		Marty Bobbenrieth	5 ft 7 in (1.70 m)	165 lb (75 kg)	1906-12-07	No college
F		Joseph Brennan	6 ft 0 in (1.83 m)	175 lb (79 kg)	1900-11-15	St. Augustine HS (NY)
F		George Clough	5 ft 11 in (1.80 m)	170 lb (77 kg)	1906-07-24	No college
G/F		Red Conaty	5 ft 11 in (1.80 m)	160 lb (73 kg)	1904-02-12	St. Francis College
G/F		Rody Cooney	5 ft 8 in (1.73 m)	140 lb (64 kg)	1902-05-17	No college
F/C		John Frank	6 ft 4 in (1.93 m)		1903-09-17	No college
G/F		Bob Grody	6 ft 2 in (1.88 m)	215 lb (98 kg)	1900-04-25	Hamilton College
C		Mark Harper	6 ft 4 in (1.93 m)	220 lb (100 kg)	1904-08-11	No college
C		Pat Herlihy	6 ft 4 in (1.93 m)	220 lb (100 kg)	1909-02-28	No college
G		Ray Kennedy	5 ft 9 in (1.75 m)	160 lb (73 kg)	1893-10-10	Manhattan
F/C		Willie Lapchick	6 ft 3 in (1.91 m)	170 lb (77 kg)	1905-10-08	No college
G/F		Harry McCrystal	5 ft 8 in (1.73 m)	160 lb (73 kg)	1907-02-23	No college
G/F		Tom Purcell	5 ft 10 in (1.78 m)	165 lb (75 kg)	1902-03-06	Notre Dame
G/F		Frank Roxbury	5 ft 8 in (1.73 m)	165 lb (75 kg)	1906-02-10	No college
G/F		Rusty Saunders	6 ft 2 in (1.88 m)	210 lb (95 kg)	1906-03-12	Central HS (NJ)
G		Willie Scrill	5 ft 10 in (1.78 m)	175 lb (79 kg)	1907-09-01	No college
F		Eddie Stuchbury	5 ft 8 in (1.73 m)	170 lb (77 kg)	1898-12-11	No college
G		Dave Tobey	5 ft 9 in (1.75 m)	145 lb (66 kg)	1898-05-01	Savage School for Physical Education
G/F		Bucky Williams	5 ft 7 in (1.70 m)	155 lb (70 kg)	1904-02-04	No college

Coaches
Head coach

John Donlon

Legend
- (DP) Unsigned draft pick
- (FA) Free agent
- (S) Suspended
- Injured

During the team's time spent within the Metropolitan Basketball League earlier this season, the Visitations would briefly see an unknown forward with the last name of Brooks and an unknown center with the last name of Hillcrest joining the team for a game each as well, with the team's roster during their time within the MBL also including Mike Arrasate, Marty Bobbenrieth, George Clough, Red Conaty, Rody Cooney, John Frank, Bob Grody, Willie Lapchick, Harry McCrystal, Tom Purcell, Frank Roxbury, Willie Scrill, Eddie Stuchbury, and Dave Tobey as well. Not only that, but during the team's time within the American Basketball League, four of the Visitations' players from this season in Red Conaty, Mark Harper, Ray Kennedy, and Rusty Saunders would also play for the original Washington Palace Five team seen above as well while they were in the ABL before the Visitations replaced the Palace Five squad, with the Visitations' ABL roster also including Cliff Anderson, Joseph Brennan, Rody Cooney, Pat Herlihy, Willie Scrill, and Bucky Williams as well.

== Team Standings ==
=== Metropolitan Basketball League Standings ===
Pos.	League Standings	Wins	Losses	Win %
1	Kingston Colonials	13	4	.765
2	Catskill Howitzers	11	5	.688
3	Brooklyn Visitations*	9	6	.600
4	Hudson Club	7	9	.438
5	Albany Senators	3	8	.237
6	Troy Trojans	1	11	.083
7	Paterson Pats^{×}	0	1	.000

* – The Brooklyn Visitations would drop out of the Metropolitan Basketball League on January 4, 1928, with them later taking over the spot of the Washington Palace Five team in the rivaling American Basketball League for the rest of the season going forward.
^{×} – Officially, the Paterson Pats would defeat the Kingston Colonials 33–14 on November 5, 1927. However, Paterson's manager, Joe Murray, would end up withdrawing their team from the league three days later on November 8 due to the Pats thinking themselves as too good for the rest of the competition in the MBL (with the match later be declared a forfeited loss by Paterson instead to the MBL's record books, with Kingston being declared the winners by default afterward due to John Beckman playing for Paterson despite him being under contract for the Detroit Cardinals / Olympians in the rivaling ABL by comparison at the time the match was first played). (The Pats would not only later play against the Hudson Club in the month of December, but also play against other ABL teams in exhibition matches throughout the rest of the season as well.)

The Metropolitan Basketball League would play their last game of the regular season on January 14, 1928, with the Kingston Colonials and the Catskill Howitzers hosting what might be considered an impromptu best-of-three championship series to crown what can be considered the final (original) Metropolitan Basketball League champion in league history a month later within the month of February.

=== American Basketball League Standings ===
==== Eastern Division ====
Eastern Division
Team	Wins	Losses	Winning %
New York (Original) Celtics	40	9	.816
Brooklyn Visitations*	18	11	.621
Philadelphia Warriors	30	21	.588
Washington Palace Five (/ Laundrymen) / Brooklyn Visitations*	25	26	.490
Rochester Centrals	24	28	.462
Washington Palace Five*	7	15	.318

* – The Washington Palace Five / Laundrymen franchise would have their franchise rights and record be transferred out to the Brooklyn Visitations by January 3, 1928 for the unofficial second half of the season. The placements for the Washington Palace Five / Laundrymen team and the Brooklyn Visitations team would be the unofficial placements for the ABL this season had they competed as their own squads during this season.

==== Western Division ====
Western Division
Team	Wins	Losses	Winning %
Fort Wayne Hoosiers	27	24	.529
Cleveland Rosenblums	22	29	.431
Chicago Bruins	13	36	.265
Detroit Cardinals / Olympians†	5	13	.278

† – Withdrew from the ABL on January 3, 1928 by the start of the unofficial second half of the season.
