= 1934–35 Brooklyn Visitations season =

- League champions
- League: American Basketball League (revived original)
- Head coach: John Donlon
- General manager: John Donlon
- Arena: Grand Prospect Hall

Results
- Record: 25–18 (.581)
- Place: Conference: 3rd (1st half); T–1st (2nd half)
- Playoff finish: ABL Champions (Won 3–2 over New York Jewels)

The 1934–35 Brooklyn Visitations season was their fourteenth professional basketball season in Brooklyn, New York, as well as their second season in what would be the revived version of the American Basketball League (though if one were to include the original ABL seasons they played in with the revived version of the ABL, the Visitations would appear in six total seasons (five full total seasons) within the combined operations of the American Basketball League instead). While the ABL continued using the split season formatting similar to not just their previous season, but most of the original iteration of the ABL's existence had done as well, they would start the league with seven teams competing this time around instead of the original teams from its first season of its revival (with some subtle changes to the team structure for the league within this season at hand) before going down to six teams instead from the first half of the season to the second half of the season due to the Newark Bears and the New Britain Jackaways merging operations by the end of the first half of the season and the start of the second half of the season to become the New Britain Mules for the rest of the season going forward there. In any case, the Visitations would look to improve their roster by not only acquiring old veterans Joseph Brennan and Red Conaty (older brother of Frank Conaty), but also acquiring future NBL star players Jake Pelkington and Bobby McDermott to be a part of their roster as well. While the new additions wouldn't cause much help early on in the first half of the season due to them barely being above-average for a 13–11 finish for third place behind the Philadelphia SPHAs / Hebrews and New York Jewels, the Visitations would end up being tied with the Philadelphia SPHAs / Hebrews in the second half of the season for first place in the second half of the season due to them finishing that half of the season with an above-average 12–7 record, performing a lot better along the way there. While the Visitations had risked being eliminated from qualifying for the ABL's championship series against the New York Jewels following their Game 1 loss to Philadelphia in the Second Half First Place Tiebreaker Playoff series match-up that occurred between the two teams, the Visitations would end up bouncing back on the road in the city of Philadelphia to win the series 2–1 over the defending ABL champions to qualify for the second ever ABL championship series against the Jewels. From there, the Visitations' starting line-up of Pete Berenson, Howie Bollerman, Frank Conaty, Carl Johnson, and Bobby McDermott would end up competing in a very close championship series with the Jewels before eventually winning what would later become their final championship ever won as a franchise with a 3–2 series win over the Jewels to become the second championship ever won in the ABL's revived history, as well as the sixth (and final) championship won between their time spent within multiple iterations of the Metropolitan Basketball League and the American Basketball League and their second (and final) ABL championship won after previously winning the original iteration's final championship held back in 1931.

== Roster ==
Due to information on American Basketball League players being generally hard to find, there are bound to be more gaps and/or inaccuracies found in certain areas on the team's roster spots than usual.

1934–35 Brooklyn Visitations roster
Players

Pos.	No.	Player	Height	Weight	DOB	From
G/F		Pete Berenson	5 ft 10 in (1.78 m)	180 lb (82 kg)	1914-04-02	CCNY
F/C		Howie Bollerman	6 ft 8 in (2.03 m)	200 lb (91 kg)	1907-06-09	Colgate
F		Joseph Brennan	6 ft 0 in (1.83 m)	175 lb (79 kg)	1900-11-15	St. Augustine HS (NY)
F/C		Charlie Burkhard	6 ft 3 in (1.91 m)	220 lb (100 kg)	1908-05-15	No college
F		Frank Conaty	6 ft 2 in (1.88 m)	164 lb (74 kg)	1909-12-30	No college
G/F		Red Conaty	5 ft 11 in (1.80 m)	160 lb (73 kg)	1904-02-12	St. Francis College
G/F		Rody Cooney	5 ft 8 in (1.73 m)	140 lb (64 kg)	1902-05-17	No college
G		Joe Geary	5 ft 11 in (1.80 m)	175 lb (79 kg)	1911-02-13	St. Francis College
G/F		Sid Gross	6 ft 0 in (1.83 m)	170 lb (77 kg)	1912-11-18	NYU
G		Carl Johnson	5 ft 8 in (1.73 m)	150 lb (68 kg)	1909-10-19	William L. Dickinson HS (NJ)
G		Bobby McDermott	5 ft 11 in (1.80 m)	180 lb (82 kg)	1914-01-07	Flushing HS (NY)
F/C		Jake Pelkington	6 ft 6 in (1.98 m)	220 lb (100 kg)	1916-01-03	Manhattan
G		Danny Sexton	6 ft 2 in (1.88 m)	220 lb (100 kg)	1913-11-01	No college
G/F		Taxi Tackach	6 ft 1 in (1.85 m)	185 lb (84 kg)	1911-02-11	No college
C		Orville Terjesen	6 ft 4 in (1.93 m)	195 lb (88 kg)	1911-06-13	No college
G		Jim Timoney	5 ft 9 in (1.75 m)	150 lb (68 kg)	1910-01-05	No college
G/F		Milt Trupin	5 ft 10 in (1.78 m)	160 lb (73 kg)	1909-09-05	CCNY

Coaches
Head coach

John Donlon

Legend
- (DP) Unsigned draft pick
- (FA) Free agent
- (S) Suspended
- Injured

Note: The team's playoff/championship series roster would include only Pete Berenson, Howie Bollerman, Frank Conaty, Carl Johnson, and Bobby McDermott.

== American Basketball League Standings ==
First Half
Team	Wins	Losses	Winning %
New York Jewels	16	6	.727
Philadelphia SPHAs / Hebrews	13	10	.565
Brooklyn Visitations	13	11	.542
Newark Mules^{[a]}	12	11	.522
Boston Trojans	10	11	.476
Jersey Reds	7	14	.333
New Britain Jackaways^{[a]}	6	14	.300

Second Half
Team	Wins	Losses	Winning %
Brooklyn Visitations	12	7	.632
Philadelphia SPHAs / Hebrews	12	7	.632
New Britain Mules^{[a]}	9	9	.500
Jersey Reds	9	9	.500
New York Jewels	8	10	.444
Boston Trojans	4	12	.250

== ABL Playoffs ==
=== ABL Second Half First Place Tiebreaker Series ===
Second Half First Place Tiebreaker Series
Game	Date	Opponent	Score	Record
Game 1	April 5	Philadelphia SPHAs / Hebrews	15–24	0–1
Game 2	April 6	@ Philadelphia SPHAs / Hebrews	39–30	1–1
Game 3	April 11	@ Philadelphia SPHAs / Hebrews	26–25	2–1

=== ABL Championship Series ===
New York Jewels (1st Half Champions) Vs. Brooklyn Visitations (2nd Half 1st Place Tiebreaker Champions): Brooklyn Visitations win series 3–2

ABL Championship Series
Game	Date	Opponent	Score	Record
Game 1	April 12	New York Jewels	26–16	1–0
Game 2	April 13	@ New York Jewels^{[b]}	25–26	1–1
Game 3	April 14	@ New York Jewels	29–19	2–1
Game 4	April 21	New York Jewels	25–26	2–2
Game 5	April 28	New York Jewels	26–10	3–2

== Awards and honors ==
By the end of the season, Carl Johnson would end up being the leading scorer of the entire league for the second season of its return and its eighth overall season of its existence with 310 points scored for an average of 7.2 points per game. This not only marked the last season where the leading scorer of the ABL would average a bit over 7 points per game in a season, but he'd also have the second-lowest scoring average from the ABL's leading scorers behind Rusty Saunders in the original iteration of the ABL's inaugural season and the lowest points per game average in the revived version of the (original) ABL.

== Notes ==
^{a} At the end of the first half of the season, the Newark Mules and New Britain Jackaways would merge operations to become the New Britain Mules on January 18, 1935. Because of the merger, the Newark franchise would fold operations by the start of the second half of the season, while the New Britain franchise would continue operations under a (mostly) new roster for the second half of the season.
^{b} Game was played in Philadelphia.
