= 1930–31 Brooklyn Visitations season =

- League champions
- League: American Basketball League (original)
- Head coach: John Donlon
- General manager: John Donlon
- Owner(s): Unknown (John Donlon?)
- Arena: Grand Prospect Hall

Results
- Record: 22–15 (.595)
- Place: Conference: 1st (1st half); 3rd (2nd half)
- Playoff finish: ABL Champions (Won 4–2 over Fort Wayne Hoosiers); Won overall basketball championship with a 37–31 victory over the New York Renaissance.

The 1930–31 Brooklyn Visitations season was their tenth professional basketball season in Brooklyn, New York, as well as their fourth and final (full) season in the original American Basketball League (under its sixth and final season of its original existence) after previously entering the ABL as a last-minute replacement for the Washington Palace Five team on January 3, 1928. For the fifth and final time in the six original seasons that the ABL first had within that original era of existence, the American Basketball League would utilize the split season formatting, though unlike their other seasons of existence, they would only see seven teams competing in the two half seasons being utilized this time around instead of eight or nine teams with one whole season being utilized throughout that entire period of time (which would be the case throughout the majority of the league's existence in the first place). Worse yet for the ABL, similar to the previous season, two teams in the first half of the season would end up dropping out of the season with average records on their ends, with the long-standing, champion favorite Cleveland Rosenblums dropping out of the ABL by December 8, 1930 with a 6–6 record and the (original) Paterson Crescents dropping out of the ABL on December 30, 1930 with a 9–9 record. During the first half of the season, however, the Visitations would end up looking like they would be the best team out of the five surviving teams of the entire ABL for this season, as they would end that half of the season with an above-average 14–7 record for the first half of the season. However, the second half of the season would showcase a more disappointingly average 8–8 record to get a third place finish that was below the tied placement of both the Chicago Bruins and the Fort Wayne Hoosiers, failing to become automatic champions of the league by default. Luckily for the Visitations, due to them previously winning the first half of the season, they would automatically qualify for what would later become the final ABL championship series ever held (in terms of its original existence, at least), which would be held after the Bruins and Hoosiers held their second half first place tiebreaker playoff series, with Fort Wayne later sweeping Chicago in that series. In this ABL championship series, it would become the most competitive championship series of the original league's entire history, as despite the series seeing some really low final scores, it would also see a double-overtime game with the series going as high as six games played in the best-of-seven series played. However, the Visitations would end up being named the final ABL champions for the original league's existence, as they would win 4–2 over the Hoosiers in that league's final season of existence before officially suspending operations for the next two seasons due to the long-term effects of the Great Depression (with the ABL later returning in the 1933–34 in a different manner with the Visitations at hand there to help establish a connection between the old and new ABL as one and the same leagues there). As for the Visitations themselves, after waiting around (potentially being an independent team) for the rest of 1931, they would eventually return to being a professional team in 1932 due to an attempt at reviving the Metropolitan Basketball League going down for that year and the following 1932–33 season not long afterward.

== Roster ==
Due to information on American Basketball League players being generally hard to find, there are bound to be more gaps and/or inaccuracies found in certain areas on the team's roster spots than usual.

1930–31 Brooklyn Visitations roster
Players

Pos.	No.	Player	Height	Weight	DOB	From
F		Joseph Brennan	6 ft 0 in (1.83 m)	175 lb (79 kg)	1900-11-15	St. Augustine HS (NY)
F		Frank Conaty	6 ft 2 in (1.88 m)	164 lb (74 kg)	1909-12-30	No college
G/F		Rody Cooney	5 ft 8 in (1.73 m)	140 lb (64 kg)	1902-05-17	No college
F/C		Buster Dunne	6 ft 2 in (1.88 m)	180 lb (82 kg)	1908-01-12	No college
G/F		Barney Felix	5 ft 9 in (1.75 m)	155 lb (70 kg)	1906-12-10	NYU
F/C		Bob Griebe	6 ft 2 in (1.88 m)	190 lb (86 kg)	1895-03-07	No college
C		Swede Hagberg	6 ft 4 in (1.93 m)	220 lb (100 kg)	1907-06-18	West Virginia
C		Pat Herlihy	6 ft 4 in (1.93 m)	220 lb (100 kg)	1909-02-28	No college
F/C		Al Kellett	6 ft 3 in (1.91 m)	200 lb (91 kg)	1901-10-30	Columbia
F/C		Mike Mazurki	6 ft 4 in (1.93 m)	210 lb (95 kg)	1907-12-25	Manhattan
G/F		Happy Reilly	5 ft 8 in (1.73 m)	165 lb (75 kg)	1907	No college
G		Willie Scrill	5 ft 10 in (1.78 m)	175 lb (79 kg)	1907-09-01	No college

Coaches
Head coach

John Donlon

Legend
- (DP) Unsigned draft pick
- (FA) Free agent
- (S) Suspended
- Injured

Note: In addition to all of these players, there was also an unknown guard/forward with the last name of Walsh (suggested to have a first name that starts with either an F or a W) that was on the roster as well. Not only that, but the team's final roster for the final ABL championship series in its original iteration included the likes of Frank Conaty, Rody Cooney, Pat Herlihy, Al Kellett, Happy Reilly, and Willie Scrill as the remaining members for the championship series there.

== American Basketball League Standings ==
First Half
Team	Wins	Losses	Winning %
Brooklyn Visitations	14	7	.667
Fort Wayne Hoosiers	13	9	.591
Rochester Centrals	10	9	.526
Toledo Red Man Tobaccos	8	13	.381
Chicago Bruins	7	14	.333
Cleveland Rosenblums*	6	6	.500
Paterson Crescents**	9	9	.500

* – The two-time defending ABL champions (and three-time overall ABL champions) in the Cleveland Rosenblums would surprisingly end up dropping out of the league on December 8, 1930 due to the long-term effects of the Great Depression kicking in for them.
** – The (original) Paterson Crescents franchise would end up dropping out of the league near the end of the first half of the season on December 30, 1930.

Second Half
Team	Wins	Losses	Winning %
Fort Wayne Hoosiers	11	5	.688
Chicago Bruins	11	5	.688
Brooklyn Visitations	8	8	.500
Rochester Centrals	5	10	.333
Toledo Red Man Tobaccos	4	11	.274

== ABL Playoffs ==
While the ABL technically wouldn't hold a traditional playoff format this season, they would hold a tiebreaker playoff series for determining the official first place winner for the second half of the season to have that team then go up into the actual championship series for the overall ABL season this time around due to the Fort Wayne Hoosiers tying their first place result with the Chicago Bruins for the second half of this season. Once the second half tiebreaker got determined properly, the ABL's final (original) championship series would get underway properly for the Brooklyn Visitations.

=== ABL Championship Series ===
Brooklyn Visitations (1st Half Champions) Vs. Fort Wayne Hoosiers (2nd Half Tiebreaker Champions): Brooklyn Visitations win series 4–2

- Game 1: March 5, 1931 @ Brooklyn: Brooklyn Visitations 14, Fort Wayne Hoosiers 10
- Game 2: March 8, 1931 @ Brooklyn: Brooklyn Visitations 21, Fort Wayne Hoosiers 13
- Game 3: March 10, 1931 @ Fort Wayne: Fort Wayne Hoosiers 24, Brooklyn Visitations 20
- Game 4: March 11, 1931: Fort Wayne Hoosiers 30, Brooklyn Visitations 26 (2OT @ Fort Wayne)
- Game 5: March 13, 1931 @ Fort Wayne: Brooklyn Visitations 18, Fort Wayne Hoosiers 13
- Game 6: March 15, 1931 @ Brooklyn: Brooklyn Visitations 24, Fort Wayne Hoosiers 18

This would later end up becoming the final championship series held by the original American Basketball League, as they would suspend operations for the next two seasons due to the long-term effects of the Great Depression. While the ABL would later return to action for the 1933–34 season under the same management and a select few teams from the original ABL's history (including the same Brooklyn Visitations team from this version of the ABL) in order to maintain the revived ABL's connection with the original ABL (and essentially have its history be one and the same with itself), the revived version of the American Basketball League would ultimately end up downgrading its scope to becoming more of a regional professional basketball league instead of the initially intended national professional basketball league that this version of the ABL was going for here. In addition to that, the final game played between the two teams would end up being considered the first professional basketball game to have a play-by-play account of a game occur throughout multiple locations at once, in this case going from Brooklyn, New York to Fort Wayne, Indiana. (Interestingly, following this season's conclusion, the Visitations would compete in a winner-takes-all match with the all-black New York Renaissance Hall of Fame team to determine the overall champion for the sport of basketball this season, with the Visitations defeating the Renaissance to be named the official champions of the sport for this season.)
