= 1924–25 Brooklyn Visitations season =

- League champions
- League: Metropolitan Basketball League (original)
- Head coach: John Donlon
- General manager: John Donlon
- Arena: Grand Prospect Hall

Results
- Record: 24–15 (.615)
- Place: Conference: 3rd (1st half); 1st (2nd half)
- Playoff finish: MBL Champions (Won 2–1 over Kingston Colonials)

The 1924–25 Brooklyn Visitations season was both their fourth professional basketball season in Brooklyn, New York and their fourth overall season in the (original version of the) Metropolitan Basketball League. This season wouldn't see much change occur within the MBL, as outside of the Kingston Colonials briefly moving their operations from Kingston, New York to Passaic, New Jersey to become the Passaic Panthers for a brief portion of the first half of the season, there would be no real significant team changes occurring within the Metropolitan Basketball League in terms of team aspects this time around. With that being said, the Visitations would end up having an average first half for their season with a 10–10 record, being behind only the Greenport Knights of St. Anthony and the Passaic Panthers turned (back into the) Kingston Colonials (the latter of which became the official first half champions of the season by one game) for a third place finish since those were the only other teams to have had an above-average finish for that half of the season. However, when Brooklyn entered the second half of the season, they would return to their high level of prowess from the previous season with the combined scoring efforts of Joseph Brennan, Davey Banks, and Rody Cooney all being able to help lead the team to a much better, above-average 14–5 record, which would put them ahead of the Paterson Legionnaires for a first place finish to become the second half champions of the season, which led to the Visitations competing in their first ever championship series in franchise history against the Kingston Colonials (their first championship within the MBL would be won by default due to them winning both halves of the previous season there). Once the championship series first began in late March, both Kingston and Brooklyn would split their first two games of the series played (though the second game was played in Greenport, New York instead of Kingston, New York) before a delay (likely due to other teams competing within the areas of interest during this same period of time) led to the two teams having their final game of the championship series be held in the neutral area of Paterson, New Jersey instead on April 11, 1925. From there, the Visitations would end up overcoming a six point lead by the Colonials with three minutes left to go in the game to win 33–29 to earn their first and only repeat with their second straight championship won in the MBL. (Interestingly, following this season's conclusion, the Visitations would compete in a best-of-three championship series against the Naismith Basketball Hall of Fame worthy Original Celtics franchise to (unofficially) determine the overall champion for the sport of basketball this season, though the Visitations would be swept 2–0 against the Celtics there.)

== Roster ==
Due to information on older professional basketball leagues being generally hard (if not outright impossible these days) to find for players from leagues like the Metropolitan Basketball League, there are bound to be more gaps and/or inaccuracies found in certain areas on the team's roster spots than usual.

1924–25 Brooklyn Visitations roster
Players

Pos.	No.	Player	Height	Weight	DOB	From
G/F		Davey Banks	5 ft 7 in (1.70 m)	155 lb (70 kg)	1901-01-04	No college
F		Joseph Brennan	6 ft 0 in (1.83 m)	175 lb (79 kg)	1900-11-15	St. Augustine HS (NY)
G/F		Red Conaty	5 ft 11 in (1.80 m)	160 lb (73 kg)	1904-02-12	St. Francis College
G/F		Rody Cooney	5 ft 8 in (1.73 m)	140 lb (64 kg)	1902-05-17	No college
F/C		Bob Griebe	6 ft 2 in (1.88 m)	190 lb (86 kg)	1895-03-07	No college
C		Swede Grimstead	6 ft 3 in (1.91 m)	190 lb (86 kg)	1891-03-23	No college
G/F		Bob Grody	6 ft 2 in (1.88 m)	215 lb (98 kg)	1900-04-25	Hamilton College
F/C		Al Kellett	6 ft 3 in (1.91 m)	200 lb (91 kg)	1901-10-30	Columbia
F		Jimmy Lynch	5 ft 11 in (1.80 m)		1901	St. Francis College
F		Willie McDonald			1904	No college
G/F		Doc Newman	5 ft 9 in (1.75 m)	170 lb (77 kg)	1890-02-03	No college
G		Pete Reiher	5 ft 6 in (1.68 m)	155 lb (70 kg)	1904-12-16	St. John's
F		Eddie White	5 ft 11 in (1.80 m)	165 lb (75 kg)	1894	No college

Coaches
Head coach

John Donlon

Legend
- (DP) Unsigned draft pick
- (FA) Free agent
- (S) Suspended
- Injured

Note: The final roster for the Brooklyn Visitations in the MBL championship series for this season included Joseph Brennan, Bob Griebe, Swede Grimstead, Bob Grody, Willie McDonald, and Eddie White.

== Metropolitan Basketball League Standings ==
First Half
Team	Wins	Losses	Winning %
Passaic Panthers / Kingston Colonials*	13	7	.650
Greenpoint Knights of St. Anthony	12	8	.600
Brooklyn Visitations	10	10	.500
Yonkers Chippewas	8	10	.444
Trenton (Royal) Bengals	8	11	.421
Paterson Legionnaires	7	12	.368

* – The Passaic Panthers would move from Passaic, New Jersey back into Kingston, New York to become the Kingston Colonials once again on November 23, 1924 for the rest of the season going forward.

Second Half
Team	Wins	Losses	Winning %
Brooklyn Visitations	14	5	.737
Paterson Legionnaires	11	7	.611
Greenpoint Knights of St. Anthony	9	8	.529
Kingston Colonials	8	9	.471
Trenton (Royal) Bengals	5	11	.313
Yonkers Chippewas	7	13	.350

== Metropolitan Basketball League Championship Series ==
Kingston Colonials (1st Half Champions) Vs. Brooklyn Visitations (2nd Half Champions): Brooklyn Visitations win series 2–1

- Game 1: March 22, 1925 @ Kingston: Kingston Colonials 25, Brooklyn Visitations 20
- Game 2: March 24, 1925 @ Greenpoint: Brooklyn Visitations 31, Kingston Colonials 14
- Game 3: April 11, 1925 @ Brooklyn: Brooklyn Visitations 33, Kingston Colonials 29

This would be the first proper championship series that the Brooklyn Visitations would win since the first championship they won the previous season would essentially be won by default due to them winning both halves of that previous season on their ends.
