= 1926–27 Brooklyn Visitations season =

- League: National Basketball League
- Head coach: John Donlon
- General manager: John Donlon
- Owner(s): Unknown (John Donlon?)
- Arena: Grand Prospect Hall

Results
- Record: 18–7 (.720)
- Place: Conference: 2nd
- Playoff finish: League folded operations by the ABL's strongman takeover on December 14, 1926. (Might be considered the (un)official champions of the NBL when the Original Celtics defected from the NBL to the ABL.)

1926–27 Brooklyn Visitations season
- League champions
- League: Metropolitan Basketball League (original)
- Head coach: John Donlon
- General manager: John Donlon
- Owner(s): Unknown (John Donlon?)
- Arena: Grand Prospect Hall

Results
- Record: 12–6 (.667)
- Place: Conference: 1st (1st half); 2nd/3rd (2nd half)
- Playoff finish: MBL Champions (Won 3–0 over Paterson Crescents)

The 1926–27 Brooklyn Visitations season was their sixth professional basketball season in Brooklyn, New York under both their only season under what would be considered the 1920s version of the National Basketball League (which also featured the Original Celtics as a competing team) and their sixth official season in the (original) Metropolitan Basketball League. When the Metropolitan Basketball League saw how much of a success the first season of the rivaling American Basketball League was for that league in regards to it being a truly national basketball league, the Metropolitan Basketball League would create a rivaling professional basketball league called the National Basketball League (which wouldn't be related to the National Basketball League that would eventually be considered a predecessor to the present day National Basketball Association, but instead were essentially a rebranded version of the Metropolitan Basketball League that the Original Celtics franchise had intended to join at first before declining due to how few games and how tiny the venues they had to play in were this time around) with seven teams (most of which were merged teams competing in combined home venues (such as the Paterson Legionnaires/Kingston Raiders and Greenpoint Knights of St. Anthony/Trenton Royal Bengals) still within the New York and New Jersey areas) competing within that league's inaugural season under that name, with the Brooklyn Visitations being the only team staying in one location throughout the entire season there (while the Naismith Basketball Hall of Fame worthy Original Celtics team were a part of the NBL and even had competed as the Original Celtics there (at least according to most sporting outlets), the Original Celtics would compete in both New York City (specifically within the Brooklyn area just like the Visitations have been doing) and in Arcola, New Jersey with the unofficial New York/Arcola (Original) Celtics name in mind for them, though the Celtics would gain an extra 10 cents per home ticket sold this season than the rest of the teams there). While the National Basketball League had intended to be a worthy competitor to the American Basketball League at the time due to the NBL taking some of the ABL's talents from teams like the Brooklyn Arcadians, Detroit Pulaski Post Five, and Washington Palace Five (which subsequently led to the ends of two of those three teams later on that same season), a surprising strongman takeover back by the ABL (which included the league leading Original Celtics, who had a 14–3 record in the NBL at the time, defecting from the NBL to the rivaling ABL during that same season (though they had to do so under the express purpose of operating as the Brooklyn Celtics for the rest of that season in the ABL as a replacement team of sorts for the original Brooklyn Arcadians franchise)) led to the NBL dealing with a surprisingly early demise on their ends by December 14, 1926, with the Brooklyn Visitations (who had been in second place behind the Celtics with an 18–7 record) unofficially being considered the league's champions since they had the best record of the remaining teams that didn't leave the NBL before it ended up facing its early demise.

Following the failure of the ("original version" of the) NBL, the Brooklyn Visitations would end up returning to the Metropolitan Basketball League under a compromised form of itself following its failed attempt to compete against the newer, yet bigger American Basketball League. For starters, the Newark Bears and Paterson Legionnaires would end up leaving the MBL and end up being replaced by the Paterson Crescents and West Brooklyn Assumption Triangles, with the Passaic Mets moving back from Passaic, New Jersey to Kingston, New York to become the Kingston Colonials once again. Not only that, but the defending MBL champion Greenpoint Knights of St. Anthony would end up leaving the league following the first half of the season, while both the West Brooklyn Assumption Triangles and the Yonkers Indians would end up leaving the MBL during the second half of the season themselves, which left the now-struggling league with only three competing teams left throughout the rest of that season in the Brooklyn Visitations, the Kingston Colonials, and the Paterson Crescents. Despite the serious struggles with finishing the Metropolitan Basketball League's latest season up properly, however, the MBL would still find enough success with itself to at least provide a proper championship series at hand there between the two best (surviving) teams from each half-season, which were the Brooklyn Visitations with a near-perfect 8–2 first half record (being one game ahead of the nearby West Brooklyn Assumption Triangles) and the Paterson Crescents with their perfect 7–0 second half record (with the Brooklyn Visitations having an average 4–4 (or 3–3) record by comparison to them to place either second or third place, depending on whether one counts the West Brooklyn Assumption Triangles as a better team despite them exiting the league near the end of the second half of the season, with the Kingston Colonials finishing in last place by that half of the season in terms of surviving teams). Funnily enough, the MBL's championship series that was held for this season would end up being a best-of-five series instead of a best-of-three series despite the league's hobbled up status by this point in time, though it's likely the increased number of games was due to the MBL having a vain attempt to still compete with the rivaling ABL by this point in time. In any case, the championship series that was held by the MBL would end up being a quick one by comparison to some of the league's past championship series events held, as the championship series would be only a week long despite having more games planned for it, with the Brooklyn Visitations having a quick 3–0 series sweep over the Paterson Crescents (due in part to them acting more like their first half selves over their second half selves for the season) in order to be crowned the champions of the MBL for the third time in four straight seasons in the MBL (as well as the final MBL championship won under the original Metropolitan Basketball League's existence). However, the Visitations would also be considered the champions of the National Basketball League as well (if only in an unofficial manner, especially since the Original Celtics had a better record than them before they left the "original" NBL in a premature manner), meaning this Brooklyn squad could technically be considered multi-league champions for this season as well.

== Roster ==
Due to information on older professional basketball leagues being generally hard (if not outright impossible these days) to find for players from leagues like the "original" National Basketball League and the Metropolitan Basketball League, there are bound to be more gaps and/or inaccuracies found in certain areas on the team's roster spots than usual. Not only that, but this roster would be listing out the combined rosters held within both the "original" National Basketball League and the Metropolitan Basketball League during this season only.

1926–27 Brooklyn Visitations roster
Players

Pos.	No.	Player	Height	Weight	DOB	From
F		Joseph Brennan	6 ft 0 in (1.83 m)	175 lb (79 kg)	1900-11-15	St. Augustine HS (NY)
G/F		Eddie Burke	5 ft 9 in (1.75 m)	160 lb (73 kg)	1894-09-03	Boys HS (NY)
G/F		Red Conaty	5 ft 11 in (1.80 m)	160 lb (73 kg)	1904-02-12	St. Francis College
G/F		Rody Cooney	5 ft 8 in (1.73 m)	140 lb (64 kg)	1902-05-17	No college
F/C		Buster Dunne	6 ft 2 in (1.88 m)	180 lb (82 kg)	1908-01-12	No college
F/C		Bob Griebe	6 ft 2 in (1.88 m)	190 lb (86 kg)	1895-03-07	No college
G/F		Bob Grody	6 ft 2 in (1.88 m)	215 lb (98 kg)	1900-04-25	Hamilton College
G		Jammy Moskowitz	5 ft 10 in (1.78 m)	180 lb (82 kg)	1904-10-05	Savage School for Physical Education
G		Willie Scrill	5 ft 10 in (1.78 m)	175 lb (79 kg)	1907-09-01	No college
F		Eddie Stuchbury	5 ft 8 in (1.73 m)	170 lb (77 kg)	1898-12-11	No college

Coaches
Head coach

John Donlon

Legend
- (DP) Unsigned draft pick
- (FA) Free agent
- (S) Suspended
- Injured

The roster for the team's entire run in the "original" National Basketball League would involve the likes of Joseph Brennan, Red Conaty, Rody Cooney, Bob Griebe, Bob Grody, and Willie Scrill being on the team for that league's brief season of existence. As for the roster's Metropolitan Basketball League team, their regular season roster would include two unknown guard/forward players with the last names of Bowden and Whalen (briefly) playing for the team alongside some of the players that were only on the team for the Metropolitan Basketball League and not the "original" National Basketball League. Not only that, but their final championship series roster during their Metropolitan Basketball League season included Red Conaty, Rody Cooney, Bob Grody, Frank Roxbury (with Roxbury only appearing with the team during the MBL championship series), Willie Scrill, and Frank Stuchbury for good measure, meaning the likes of Joseph Brennan and Bob Griebe from their time in the National Basketball League would not be a part of the team's run in the Metropolitan Basketball League, with Eddie Burke, Buster Dunne, and Jammy Moskowitz joining Mr. Bowden and Mr. Whalen as the missing members from the MBL roster as well.

== Team Standings ==
=== National Basketball League Standings ===
Team	Wins	Losses	Winning %
Original Celtics	14	3	.824
Brooklyn Visitations	18	7	.720
Greenpoint Knights of St. Anthony/Trenton Royal Bengals	11	11	.500
Paterson Legionnaires/Kingston Raiders	8	13	.381
Ridgewood/Newburgh Hillsides	3	12	.200
Ridgewood/Orange Skeeters	2	9	.222
Newburgh Hillsides/Jersey City Skeeters	1	9	.100

National Basketball League folded operations on December 14, 1926 with the Original Celtics defecting from the NBL to the rivaling ABL soon afterward. (Interestingly, the Brooklyn Visitations would join the ABL themselves a season afterward.)

=== Metropolitan Basketball League Standings ===
First Half
Team	Wins	Losses	Winning %
Brooklyn Visitations	8	2	.800
West Brooklyn Assumption Triangles	7	3	.700
Paterson Crescents	6	4	.600
Yonkers Indians	4	6	.400
Greenpoint Knights of St. Anthony†	2	5	.286
Kingston Colonials	0	7	.000

† – The Greenpoint Knights of St. Anthony dropped out of the Metropolitan Basketball League during the first half of the season (supposedly during the conclusion of the first half of the season).

Second Half
Team	Wins	Losses	Winning %
Paterson Crescents	7	0	1.000
West Brooklyn Assumption Triangles†*	3	2	.600
Brooklyn Visitations	4	4	.500
Kingston Colonials	1	2	.333
Yonkers Indians†**	4	6	.400

†* – The West Brooklyn Assumption Triangles (supposedly) dropped out of the MBL during the second half of the season (though it's (currently) not known when exactly West Brooklyn might have dropped out of the MBL by that point in time within the second half of the regular season).
†** – The Yonkers Indians dropped out of the MBL during the second half of the season on February 13, 1927.

== Metropolitan Basketball League Championship Series ==
Brooklyn Visitations (1st Half Champions) Vs. Paterson Crescents (2nd Half Champions): Brooklyn Visitations win series 3–0

- Game 1: March 13, 1927 @ Brooklyn: Brooklyn Visitations 25, Paterson Crescents 20
- Game 2: March 19, 1927 @ Paterson: Brooklyn Visitations 31, Paterson Crescents 14
- Game 3: March 20, 1927 @ Brooklyn: Brooklyn Visitations 33, Paterson Crescents 29

This not only marked the third MBL championship won in four seasons for the Brooklyn Visitations, but also their last championship won in the original iteration of that league.
