= Prospect House =

Prospect House or Prospect Hall or variations may refer to:

in the United States

- Prospect Terrace Apartments, Little Rock, Arkansas, listed on the National Register of Historic Places (NRHP)
- Prospect Farm, Petersburg, Kentucky, NRHP-listed
- Prospect Hall (Frederick, Maryland), NRHP-listed
- Pleasant Prospect, Mitchellville, Maryland, NRHP-listed
- Prospect Hall (Cambridge, Massachusetts), also known as North Avenue Congregational Church, NRHP-listed
- Prospect House (Hadley, Massachusetts), a hotel established in 1851, now the Summit House in J. A. Skinner State Park
- Prospect House (Waltham, Massachusetts), NRHP-listed
- Prospect House (Battle Lake, Minnesota), NRHP-listed in Otter Tail County
- Prospect House (Princeton, New Jersey), also known simply as Prospect, a National Historic Landmark and NRHP-listed
- Prospect Hall (Brooklyn, New York), NRHP-listed
- Prospect House (Hamilton County, New York), first hotel in the world with electric lights in all the guest rooms
- Piney Prospect, Tarboro, North Carolina, NRHP-listed
- Prospect Place, Trinway, Ohio, NRHP-listed
- Prospect Hotel, Prospect, Oregon, NRHP-listed
- Prospect (Topping, Virginia), a house that is NRHP-listed
- Prospect House (Washington, D.C.), NRHP-listed

in the United Kingdom

- Prospect House (Reading), an 18th-century house in Reading, now used as restaurant

== See also ==
- Prospect (disambiguation)
- Prospect Hill (disambiguation)
- Prospect Hill Historic District (disambiguation)
