= 1923–24 Brooklyn Visitations season =

- League champions
- Conference champions
- League: Metropolitan Basketball League (original)
- Head coach: John Donlon
- General manager: John Donlon
- Owner(s): Unknown (John Donlon?)
- Arena: Grand Prospect Hall

Results
- Record: 26–14 (.650)
- Place: Conference: 1st (both halves)
- Playoff finish: No playoffs necessary. (Automatically won the MBL's championship by default due to them being the best team in both halves of the MBL this season.)

The 1923–24 Brooklyn Visitations season was both their third professional basketball season in Brooklyn, New York and their third overall season in the (original version of the) Metropolitan Basketball League. Entering this season, the Metropolitan Basketball League would see only six members competing in the league once again, as while the Trenton Royal Bengals from the former Eastern Basketball League ended up joining the Metropolitan Basketball League following the EBL's (premature) demise and the Kingston Colonials from the New York State Basketball League ended up defecting from the smaller New York-based league into the larger MBL, the MBL would also see four more departures occur in the Elizabeth Club from Elizabeth, New Jersey, the New York MacDowell Lyceum from New York City, and the two other Brooklyn-based teams in the Brooklyn Dodgers basketball team and the Brooklyn Pros, which left the Visitations as the sole Brooklyn representative remaining in the MBL. In any case, the decreased number of teams competing in the Metropolitan Basketball League would prove to a major advantage for the solely remaining Brooklyn squad in the MBL, as the Visitations would end up leading the entire league with a combined 26–14 record due to both half-seasons resulting in Brooklyn having a 13–7 to end each half-season on their ends thanks to them having two of the three best scorers of the entire league on the same team by this point in time in Joseph Brennan and Davey Banks. While a full regular season like the first Metropolitan Basketball League season would have had the Visitations competing against the defending league champion Paterson Legionnaires due to them having the second-best overall record at 22–18 (though that would be due to them having a fourth place finish through an average 10–10 record before getting a better 12–8 record for a second place finish for the second half of the season), due to the way the split season formatting worked for basketball leagues like the Metropolitan Basketball League, the Visitations would automatically be declared the league's champions by default since they won both halves of the season to be the overall league champions by default. As a result, the Brooklyn Visitations would win their first ever professional basketball championship (out of six total championships throughout multiple leagues, including four in the Metropolitan Basketball League's overall history and three in the MBL's first iteration of existence) in the process.

== Roster ==
Due to information on older professional basketball leagues being generally hard (if not outright impossible these days) to find for players from leagues like the Metropolitan Basketball League, there are bound to be more gaps and/or inaccuracies found in certain areas on the team's roster spots than usual.

1923–24 Brooklyn Visitations roster
Players

Pos.	No.	Player	Height	Weight	DOB	From
G/F		Davey Banks	5 ft 7 in (1.70 m)	155 lb (70 kg)	1901-01-04	No college
F		Joseph Brennan	6 ft 0 in (1.83 m)	175 lb (79 kg)	1900-11-15	St. Augustine HS (NY)
G/F		Red Conaty	5 ft 11 in (1.80 m)	160 lb (73 kg)	1904-02-12	St. Francis College
G/F		Rody Cooney	5 ft 8 in (1.73 m)	140 lb (64 kg)	1902-05-17	No college
G/F		Joe Dreyfus	5 ft 9 in (1.75 m)	165 lb (75 kg)	1892-12-11	No college
F/C		Bob Griebe	6 ft 2 in (1.88 m)	190 lb (86 kg)	1895-03-07	No college
C		Swede Grimstead	6 ft 3 in (1.91 m)	190 lb (86 kg)	1891-03-23	No college
G		Ray Kennedy	5 ft 9 in (1.75 m)	160 lb (73 kg)	1893-10-10	Manhattan

Coaches
Head coach

John Donlon

Legend
- (DP) Unsigned draft pick
- (FA) Free agent
- (S) Suspended
- Injured

== Metropolitan Basketball League Standings ==
First Half
Team	Wins	Losses	Winning %
Brooklyn Visitations	13	7	.650
Kingston Colonials	12	8	.600
Trenton (Royal) Bengals	11	9	.550
Paterson Legionnaires	10	10	.500
Greenpoint Knights of St. Anthony	7	13	.350
Yonkers Chippewas	7	13	.350

Second Half
Team	Wins	Losses	Winning %
Brooklyn Visitations	13	7	.650
Paterson Legionnaires	12	8	.600
Trenton (Royal) Bengals	10	10	.500
Kingston Colonials	9	11	.450
Greenpoint Knights of St. Anthony	9	11	.450
Yonkers Chippewas	7	13	.350

Overall
Team	Wins	Losses	Winning %
Brooklyn Visitations	26	14	.650
Paterson Legionnaires	22	18	.550
Kingston Colonials	21	19	.525
Trenton (Royal) Bengals	21	19	.525
Greenpoint Knights of St. Anthony	16	24	.400
Yonkers Chippewas	14	26	.350

== Metropolitan Basketball League Championship Series ==
Normally, the Metropolitan Basketball League would end up having a championship series occur between the first half champions of the season and the second half champions of the season. However, because the Brooklyn Visitations won both halves of this season in rather convincing fashion, the planned championship series would be cancelled with the Visitations automatically being declared the champions of the league for the first time in their history by default. This would be the only time in the Metropolitan Basketball League's entire history where they wouldn't be able to host a championship series due to one team winning both halves of their regular season period.
