= 1929–30 Brooklyn Visitations season =

- League: American Basketball League (original)
- Head coach: John Donlon
- General manager: John Donlon
- Owner(s): Unknown (John Donlon?)
- Arena: Grand Prospect Hall

Results
- Record: 18–11 (.621)
- Place: Conference: 2nd (1st half); 4th (2nd half)
- Playoff finish: Did not qualify

The 1929–30 Brooklyn Visitations season was their ninth professional basketball season in Brooklyn, New York, as well as their third (full) season in the original American Basketball League (under its fifth season of existence) after previously entering the ABL as a last-minute replacement for the Washington Palace Five team on January 3, 1928. For the fourth time in five seasons, the American Basketball League would utilize the split season formatting, though similar to the previous ABL season, the American Basketball League would have eight teams competing within the two half seasons that were being utilized here instead of the one whole season that was being was the season before that one. However, unlike that previous season, this season would see not just one, but two different teams drop out of the ABL entirely, with the New York (Original) Celtics basically being a shell of their former selves by this point in time and later having their average 5–5 record be stricken from the record books by the end of the season after dropping out of the league by December 19, 1929, while the Syracuse All-Americans fared even worse than them by comparison, to the point where they ended up forfeiting their final four games scheduled in the first half of the season after officially dropping out of the season themselves on January 6, 1930.

== Roster ==
Due to information on American Basketball League players being generally hard to find, there are bound to be more gaps and/or inaccuracies found in certain areas on the team's roster spots than usual.

1929–30 Brooklyn Visitations roster
Players

Pos.	No.	Player	Height	Weight	DOB	From
F		Joseph Brennan	6 ft 0 in (1.83 m)	175 lb (79 kg)	1900-11-15	St. Augustine HS (NY)
G/F		Red Conaty	5 ft 11 in (1.80 m)	160 lb (73 kg)	1904-02-12	St. Francis College
G/F		Rody Cooney	5 ft 8 in (1.73 m)	140 lb (64 kg)	1902-05-17	No college
F/C		Bob Griebe	6 ft 2 in (1.88 m)	190 lb (86 kg)	1895-03-07	No college
C		Pat Herlihy	6 ft 4 in (1.93 m)	220 lb (100 kg)	1909-02-28	No college
G/F		Happy Reilly	5 ft 8 in (1.73 m)	165 lb (75 kg)	1907	No college
G		Willie Scrill	5 ft 10 in (1.78 m)	175 lb (79 kg)	1907-09-01	No college
G/F		Bucky Williams	5 ft 7 in (1.70 m)	155 lb (70 kg)	1904-02-04	No college

Coaches
Head coach

John Donlon

Legend
- (DP) Unsigned draft pick
- (FA) Free agent
- (S) Suspended
- Injured

== American Basketball League Standings ==
First Half
Team	Wins	Losses	Winning %
Cleveland Rosenblums	17	7	.738
Brooklyn Visitations	15	9	.625
Rochester Centrals	14	10	.583
Chicago Bruins	12	12	.500
Fort Wayne Hoosiers	12	12	.500
Paterson Crescents	10	14	.417
New York (Original) Celtics†*	5	5	.500
Syracuse All-Americans†	4	20	.167

† – Withdrew from the ABL before the first half of the season officially ended, with the New York (Original) Celtics dropping out of the league on December 19, 1929 and the Syracuse All-Americans dropping out of the ABL (and forfeiting their final four games of the first half of the season by default) on January 6, 1930 near the end of the first half of the season.
* – Withdrew from the ABL after playing only ten total games during the first half of this season, with their games being stricken from the official league record books during this season despite having an average record this season.

Second Half
Team	Wins	Losses	Winning %
Rochester Centrals	19	11	.633
Cleveland Rosenblums	18	12	.600
Chicago Bruins	17	13	.567
Brooklyn Visitations	15	15	.500
Fort Wayne Hoosiers	13	17	.433
Paterson Crescents	8	22	.267
