= 1928–29 Brooklyn Visitations season =

- League: American Basketball League (original)
- Head coach: John Donlon
- General manager: John Donlon
- Owner(s): Unknown (John Donlon?)
- Arena: Grand Prospect Hall

Results
- Record: 18–11 (.621)
- Place: Conference: T–3rd (1st half) T–2nd (2nd half)
- Playoff finish: Did not qualify

The 1928–29 Brooklyn Visitations season was their eighth professional basketball season in Brooklyn, New York, as well as their second (full) season in the original American Basketball League (under its fourth season of existence) after previously entering the ABL as a last-minute replacement for the Washington Palace Five team on January 3, 1928. During the offseason, the ABL had entered a crossroads of sorts where the league's popularity was considered to be rather high, but it came at the cost of the Original Celtics dominating the rest of the competition and risked ending the rest of the league due to games featuring the Original Celtics (usually) showcasing high attendance values upon road matches (to the point where some crowds would chant "Break up the Celtics!"), but often displaying poor attendance values for the rest of the games in the league by comparison (to the point where only five teams looked certain to enter this season originally). Not only that, but the Celtics' own team owner, Jim Furey, would have to go to prison during this upcoming season due to him embezzling $187,000 from a company he worked with in his spare time called the Arnold Constable Corporation. This combination of factors alongside the change of league presidents from NFL president Joseph Carr to former Interstate Basketball League and Metropolitan Basketball League (the latter league the Visitations and a couple of the new teams for this season were previously a part of) creator and president, Naismith Basketball Hall of Famer John J. O'Brien, led to the ABL accepting the wishes of both the fans and other league owners in breaking up the Original Celtics (and having them replaced by the New York Hakoahs for this season by extension) in order to help bolster other ABL teams up for plans of long-term success going forward (although the final results of that planned decision ultimately resulted in them creating a different superteam of sorts with the Cleveland Rosenblums taking on most of the Original Celtics' players instead). During the first half of the season, the Visitations would end up tying with the Chicago Bruins to have an above-average 15–12 record to have them both finish in third place behind the Fort Wayne Hoosiers and the first half champion Cleveland Rosenblums. As for the second half of the season, the Visitations would end up finishing the half-season in another tie, this time with the Rosenblums, as they both finished the second half of the season with a 10–4 record for a second place finish that put them both behind the Fort Wayne Hoosiers for a first place finish instead. Despite the good overall record that the Visitations had this season, Brooklyn would fail to qualify for the ABL championship series due to them failing to finish in first place in either half-season of play.

== Roster ==
Due to information on American Basketball League players being generally hard to find, there are bound to be more gaps and/or inaccuracies found in certain areas on the team's roster spots than usual.

1928–29 Brooklyn Visitations roster
Players

Pos.	No.	Player	Height	Weight	DOB	From
F		Joseph Brennan	6 ft 0 in (1.83 m)	175 lb (79 kg)	1900-11-15	St. Augustine HS (NY)
G/F		Tony Calland	5 ft 7 in (1.70 m)	155 lb (70 kg)	1902-09-02	No college
G/F		Red Conaty	5 ft 11 in (1.80 m)	160 lb (73 kg)	1904-02-12	St. Francis College
G/F		Rody Cooney	5 ft 8 in (1.73 m)	140 lb (64 kg)	1902-05-17	No college
G		Harry Gill			Unknown	No college
C		Pat Herlihy	6 ft 4 in (1.93 m)	220 lb (100 kg)	1909-02-28	No college
F/C		Harry Knoblauch	6 ft 2 in (1.88 m)	190 lb (86 kg)	1898-04-21	No college
F/C		Leo Malone	6 ft 3 in (1.91 m)	190 lb (86 kg)	1890-12-12	No college
F		Willie McDonald			1904	No college
C		Dick Page	6 ft 6 in (1.98 m)	180 lb (82 kg)	1907-01-07	Niagara
G/F		Red Pugh	5 ft 8 in (1.73 m)	150 lb (68 kg)	1907-04-02	Newtown HS (NY)
G/F		Dutch Schultheiss	5 ft 10 in (1.78 m)	175 lb (79 kg)	1896-08-26	No college
G		Willie Scrill	5 ft 10 in (1.78 m)	175 lb (79 kg)	1907-09-01	No college
C		Victor Till	6 ft 7 in (2.01 m)	220 lb (100 kg)	1906-08-07	George Washington HS (NY)
G/F		Bucky Williams	5 ft 7 in (1.70 m)	155 lb (70 kg)	1904-02-04	No college

Coaches
Head coach

John Donlon

Legend
- (DP) Unsigned draft pick
- (FA) Free agent
- (S) Suspended
- Injured

Note: Supposedly, John Frank from the previous season's roster for the Metropolitan Basketball League briefly was a part of the roster for a game during this season as well.

== American Basketball League Standings ==
First Half
Team	Wins	Losses	Winning %
Cleveland Rosenblums	19	9	.679
Fort Wayne Hoosiers	18	10	.643
Brooklyn Visitations	15	12	.556
Chicago Bruins	15	12	.556
New York Hakoahs	13	16	.448
Rochester Centrals	11	15	.423
Trenton (Royal) Bengals	13	16	.448
Paterson Whirlwinds	6	19	.240

Second Half
Team	Wins	Losses	Winning %
Fort Wayne Hoosiers	11	3	.786
Brooklyn Visitations	10	4	.714
Cleveland Rosenblums	10	4	.714
Rochester Centrals	7	7	.500
New York Hakoahs	5	9	.357
Trenton (Royal) Bengals	4	8	.333
Chicago Bruins	4	10	.286
Paterson Whirlwinds	3	9	.250
