= 1935–36 Brooklyn Visitations season =

- League: American Basketball League (revived original)
- Head coach: John Donlon
- General manager: John Donlon
- Owner(s): Unknown (John Donlon?)
- Arena: Grand Prospect Hall

Results
- Record: 22–18 (.550)
- Place: Conference: 3rd (1st half); 1st (2nd half)
- Playoff finish: Lost ABL championship series 4–3 to the Philadelphia Sphas / Hebrews

The 1935–36 Brooklyn Visitations season was their fifteenth professional basketball season in Brooklyn, New York, as well as their third season in what would be the revived version of the American Basketball League (though if one were to include the original ABL seasons they played in with the revived version of the ABL, the Visitations would appear in seven total seasons (six full total seasons) within the combined operations of the American Basketball League instead). Like most other ABL seasons in the league's history at the time, this season would see the league work in a split season format, albeit with a rather low six total teams competing throughout the entire season, although one of the teams would move consistently throughout the entire season by going from the Paterson Panthers to start out the season to the Trenton Bengals by December 12, 1935 until the end of the first half of the season before they become the Passaic Red Devils for the rest of the season going forward once the second half of the season began. While competing under a more consistent roster throughout the entire season, the defending champion Visitations would end the first half of the season with a disappointingly average 10–10 record to finish with a third place performance to be behind only the New York Jewels and the Philadelphia SPHAs / Hebrews for that half of the season. Luckily for the defending champions of the ABL, the Visitations would lock in their performances by being a bit more consistent with themselves when compared to the rest of the league in question, as they would finish the season with an above-average 12–8 record to finish the second half of the season with a first place performance that had them one game ahead of the Jersey Reds and two games ahead of the Jewels in the process. Because of their first place performance in the second half of the season, the Visitations would have a chance at repeating as champions of the ABL as they would go up against the first half champions of the season, the Philadelphia SPHAs / Hebrews, to determine the overall league champions for the season (as well as find out who would win their second championship in three seasons within the ABL's revival period). During the ABL championship series, both the Sphas (alternatively known as the Hebrews) and the Visitations would split each game played within this championship series. Unfortunately for the Visitations, Brooklyn would end up being the team that would win the even-numbered games in the championship series instead of the odd-numbered games in that series, as Philadelphia would end up winning this championship series 4–3 and avenge the second half first place tiebreaker playoff series loss they had against the Visitations from the previous season. This would later become the final playoff/championship series that the Visitations would ever appear in within the franchise's history. Following this season's conclusion, the Visitations would surprisingly move from Brooklyn, New York to Paterson, New Jersey to become the Paterson Visitations by the start of the upcoming season instead of their usual Brooklyn Visitations name.

== Roster ==
Due to information on American Basketball League players being generally hard to find, there are bound to be more gaps and/or inaccuracies found in certain areas on the team's roster spots than usual.

1935–36 Brooklyn Visitations roster
Players

Pos.	No.	Player	Height	Weight	DOB	From
G/F		Rip Andrews	5 ft 11 in (1.80 m)	175 lb (79 kg)	1910-10-05	No college
G/F		Pete Berenson	5 ft 10 in (1.78 m)	180 lb (82 kg)	1914-04-02	CCNY
F/C		Howie Bollerman	6 ft 8 in (2.03 m)	200 lb (91 kg)	1907-06-09	Colgate
F		Frank Conaty	6 ft 2 in (1.88 m)	164 lb (74 kg)	1909-12-30	No college
G/F		Rody Cooney	5 ft 8 in (1.73 m)	140 lb (64 kg)	1902-05-17	No college
G/F		Bob Grody	6 ft 2 in (1.88 m)	215 lb (98 kg)	1900-04-25	Hamilton College
G		Carl Johnson	5 ft 8 in (1.73 m)	150 lb (68 kg)	1909-10-19	William L. Dickinson HS (NJ)
G		Bobby McDermott	5 ft 11 in (1.80 m)	180 lb (82 kg)	1914-01-07	Flushing HS (NY)
F/C		Bob Synnott	6 ft 3 in (1.91 m)	190 lb (86 kg)	1912-09-27	Theodore Roosevelt HS (NY)

Coaches
Head coach

John Donlon

Legend
- (DP) Unsigned draft pick
- (FA) Free agent
- (S) Suspended
- Injured

Note: Rip Andrews would not be a part of the team's ABL championship series roster.

== American Basketball League Standings ==
First Half
Team	Wins	Losses	Winning %
Philadelphia SPHAs / Hebrews	14	5	.737
New York Jewels	11	8	.579
Brooklyn Visitations	10	10	.500
Jersey Reds	9	9	.500
Kingston Colonials	7	12	.368
Paterson Panthers / Trenton Bengals^{[a]}	4	11	.267

Second Half
Team	Wins	Losses	Winning %
Brooklyn Visitations	12	8	.600
Jersey Reds	11	9	.550
New York Jewels	10	10	.500
Kingston Colonials	9	10	.474
Philadelphia SPHAs / Hebrews	9	11	.450
Passaic Red Devils^{[a]}	8	11	.421

== American Basketball League Championship Series ==
Philadelphia SPHAs / Hebrews (1st Half Champions) Vs. Brooklyn Visitations (2nd Half Champions): Philadelphia SPHAs / Hebrews win series 4–3

ABL Championship Series
Game	Date	Opponent	Score	Record
Game 1	March 28	@ Philadelphia SPHAs / Hebrews	28–30	0–1
Game 2	March 29	Philadelphia SPHAs / Hebrews	27–24	1–1
Game 3	April 4	@ Philadelphia SPHAs / Hebrews	27–30	1–2
Game 4	April 5	Philadelphia SPHAs / Hebrews	31–24	2–2
Game 5	April 11	@ Philadelphia SPHAs / Hebrews	23–26	2–3
Game 6	April 12	Philadelphia SPHAs / Hebrews	31–30	3–3
Game 7	April 13	@ Philadelphia SPHAs / Hebrews	34–47	3–4

== Awards and honors ==
By the end of the season, Bobby McDermott would end up being the leading scorer of the entire league for the third season of its return and its ninth overall season of its existence with 382 points scored for an average of 9.6 points per game. This would be the second straight season in a row where the Brooklyn Visitations would have a player of theirs leading the entire ABL in scoring after Carl Johnson previously led the league with a total of 310 points scored for an average of 7.2 points per game that season. Not only that, but as of 2026, McDermott would be one of two leading scorers throughout the entire original ABL's history (either in its original state of existence or in its revival history) to end up being inducted into the Naismith Basketball Hall of Fame, with Bennie Borgmann being the other player in question to be inducted there.

== Notes ==
^{a} During the first half of the season, after losing all five of the games they played this season, the Paterson Panthers would move from Paterson, New Jersey to nearby Trenton, New Jersey on December 12, 1935 to become the newer version of the Trenton Bengals for the rest of the season. Trenton would finish the first half of the season with a 4–6 record for an overall record of 4–11 between the two teams before the Trenton squad moved out to nearby Passaic, New Jersey on December 30, 1935 to play as the Passaic Red Devils by the time the second half of the season began.
