= 1922–23 Brooklyn Visitations season =

- League: Metropolitan Basketball League (original)
- Head coach: John Donlon
- General manager: John Donlon
- Owner(s): Unknown (John Donlon?)
- Arena: Grand Prospect Hall

Results
- Record: 22–19 (.537)
- Place: Conference: 4th (1st half); 5th (2nd half)
- Playoff finish: Did not qualify

The 1922–23 Brooklyn Visitations season was both their second professional basketball season in Brooklyn, New York and their second overall season in the (original version of the) Metropolitan Basketball League. During the league's second season, three new teams would be added in replacement of the Paterson Power Brothers Five team from Paterson, New Jersey in the local Paterson Legionnaires team (who also played games as the Kingston Legionnaires within Kingston, New York under the rivaling New York State Basketball League), the Elizabeth Club from nearby Elizabeth, New Jersey, and the famous, Naismith Basketball Hall of Fame worthy Original Celtics team in New York City to start out the MBL, though the second half of the season would see the Yonkers Chippewas from Yonkers, New York replacing the Original Celtics after the Celtics left the MBL of their own volition near the end of the first half of the season following an undefeated 12–0 record that eventually became a part of a very famous 193–11–1 record on their ends. In any case, when the Original Celtics left the Metropolitan Basketball League with a week left to go (despite the Celtics having a perfect record on their ends), the MBL would decide to give the second place team of the league the official first place spot when that half of the season was over and done with; unfortunately for the Visitations, the second place spot that season wouldn't go to them, but to the 9–3 Elizabeth Club instead, as this Brooklyn squad would finish the first half of the season with an 8–6 record (though the Greenpoint Knights of St. Anthony would have a better overall win percentage with their 7–5 record instead), which led to them failing to be named the first half champions over the Elizabeth Club in the new split season format that was utilized for the MBL starting from this season onward. The second half of this Brooklyn squad's season in the MBL, however, would surprisingly end up being worse than their first half of the season was, as the Visitations would end up getting a fifth place finish ahead of only the first half champion Elizabeth Club and the previous two best teams of the MBL in the Brooklyn Dodgers basketball team and the New York MacDowell Lyceum despite the Visitations barely finishing the season with an above-average 14–13 record. This led to the Visitations being eliminated from playoff contention in both the second half first place tiebreaker series (which resulted in the Paterson Legionnaires winning 2–1 over the Brooklyn Pros (who had since rebranded their team name entirely from the old Brooklyn Prospect Big Five name)) and the first proper championship series ever held by the MBL (which resulted in the Paterson squad winning 3–1 over the Elizabeth Club to be named the league's champions, with the Legionnaires also having a case for being the overall champions of the sport for the season due to them not just winning the New York State Basketball League's championship as the Kingston Legionnaires, but also winning 3–2 in terms of overall games played over the Original Celtics when utilizing the Paterson/Kingston Legionnaires combination at hand). Not only that, but due to the rivaling Eastern Basketball League folding operations during the season alongside the nearby Interstate (Massachusetts) Basketball League soon afterward, the Metropolitan Basketball League would be considered the biggest operational professional basketball league of its time by the time the 1922–23 season ended due to the only other viable competition of it during that time being more local professional basketball leagues in the aforementioned New York State Basketball League and the Philadelphia Basketball League.

== Roster ==
Due to information on older professional basketball leagues being generally hard (if not outright impossible these days) to find for players from leagues like the Metropolitan Basketball League, there are bound to be more gaps and/or inaccuracies found in certain areas on the team's roster spots than usual.

1922–23 Brooklyn Visitations roster
Players

Pos.	No.	Player	Height	Weight	DOB	From
G/F		Babe Artus	6 ft 0 in (1.83 m)	200 lb (91 kg)	1898-11-20	No college
G/F		Davey Banks	5 ft 7 in (1.70 m)	155 lb (70 kg)	1901-01-04	No college
G/F		Eddie Burke	5 ft 9 in (1.75 m)	160 lb (73 kg)	1894-09-03	Boys HS (NY)
G/F		Red Conaty	5 ft 11 in (1.80 m)	160 lb (73 kg)	1904-02-12	St. Francis College
G/F		Rody Cooney	5 ft 8 in (1.73 m)	140 lb (64 kg)	1902-05-17	No college
F/C		Harry Dadson	6 ft 0 in (1.83 m)	170 lb (77 kg)	1892-11-20	No college
G/F		Walter Garland	5 ft 9 in (1.75 m)	160 lb (73 kg)	1900	No college
C		Joe Lapchick	6 ft 5 in (1.96 m)	185 lb (84 kg)	1900-04-12	No college
F		Jimmy Lynch	5 ft 11 in (1.80 m)		1901	St. Francis College
G		Bee McAllister	5 ft 6 in (1.68 m)	150 lb (68 kg)	Unknown	No college
F		Eddie White	5 ft 11 in (1.80 m)	165 lb (75 kg)	1894	No college

Coaches
Head coach

John Donlon

Legend
- (DP) Unsigned draft pick
- (FA) Free agent
- (S) Suspended
- Injured

== Metropolitan Basketball League Standings ==
First Half
Team	Wins	Losses	Winning %
Original Celtics	12	0	1.000
Elizabeth Club	9	3	.750
Greenpoint Knights of St. Anthony	7	5	.583
Brooklyn Visitations	8	6	.571
Brooklyn Pros	4	7	.364
Paterson Legionnaires	4	8	.333
New York MacDowell Lyceum	5	10	.333
Brooklyn Dodgers	2	12	.143

The Original Celtics dropped out of the Metropolitan Basketball League after the first half of the season concluded since they felt they were too strong to compete in that league for the rest of the season. As such, the Elizabeth Club was considered the official champions of the first half of the season following the Celtics' departure, with the Yonkers Chippewas replacing the Original Celtics for the second half of the season.

Second Half
Team	Wins	Losses	Winning %
Paterson Legionnaires	18	10	.643
Brooklyn Pros	18	10	.643
Greenpoint Knights of St. Anthony	16	12	.571
Yonkers Chippewas	15	13	.536
Brooklyn Visitations	14	13	.519
Elizabeth Club	9	14	.391
Brooklyn Dodgers	10	16	.385
New York MacDowell Lyceum	7	19	.269

The Paterson Legionnaires would end up winning the second half tiebreaker series for the Metropolitan Basketball League's season 2–1 over the Brooklyn Pros, with Paterson later winning the league's championship 3–1 over the Elizabeth Club. Despite the official standing of the MBL as a professional basketball league, however, the Original Celtics were more seen as either the official champions of the sport of basketball (once again) this season or close to that mark due to the similarly competitive nature of the Franklin Wonder Five high school team by comparison due to the overall record that team had, including the perfect record held in the MBL and the near-perfect record held while playing in the EBL, though the Legionnaires would make a decent case on being the overall champions for the sport due to them previously beating the Original Celtics in three out of five matches played (even if they were competing under their alternative name of the Kingston Legionnaires at the time when they were in the New York State Basketball League instead of the Paterson Legionnaires name within the MBL).
