= Prospect Hall =

Prospect Hall may refer to:

- Prospect Hall (Frederick, Maryland), listed on the National Register of Historic Places (NRHP)
- North Avenue Congregational Church, now known as Prospect Hall, Cambridge, Massachusetts, NRHP-listed
- Grand Prospect Hall, Brooklyn, New York, NRHP-listed

== See also ==
- Prospect House (disambiguation)
