= Prospect Hill =

Prospect Hill may refer to:

== Australia ==
- Prospect Hill (New South Wales), a hill in Western Sydney, New South Wales
  - Prospect Hill Reservoir, a water tower
- Prospect Hill, South Australia, a small town in the southern Adelaide Hills

== Canada ==
- Prospect Hill, Sudbury District, Ontario, a township in Ontario

== China ==
- Jingshan in Beijing, north of the Forbidden City

== United States ==
=== Buildings ===
- Prospect Hill (Long Green, Maryland), a house
- Prospect Hill (Charleston County, South Carolina), a house
- Prospect Hill (Arlington, Virginia), a former mansion that is a historic district
- Prospect Hill (Fincastle, Virginia), a house
- Prospect Hill (Fredericksburg, Virginia), a house
- Prospect Hill (Middlesex County, Virginia), home of John A. G. Davis
- Prospect Hill (Spotsylvania County, Virginia), a plantation house in Spotsylvania County, Virginia
- Prospect Hill Monument on Prospect Hill, Somerville, Massachusetts

=== Historic districts ===
- Prospect Hill, Cincinnati, Ohio
- Prospect Hill Historic District (New Haven, Connecticut)
- Prospect Hill Historic District (Willimantic, Connecticut)
- Prospect Hill Historic District (Bloomington, Indiana)
- Prospect Hill Historic District (Janesville, Wisconsin), on the National Register of Historic Places listings in Rock County, Wisconsin
- Prospect Hill Historic District (Milwaukee, Wisconsin), on the National Register of Historic Places listings in Milwaukee

=== Inhabited places ===
- Prospect Hill, Cincinnati, a historic neighborhood
- Prospect Hill, a neighborhood in Brookfield, Connecticut
- Prospect Hill, New Haven, a neighborhood of New Haven, Connecticut
- Prospect Hill, Omaha, a neighborhood of North Omaha, Nebraska
- Prospect Hill, New York, a town in Orange County, New York
- Prospect Hill, North Carolina, a community

=== Natural formations ===
- Prospect Hill, a bluff outside Manhattan, Kansas
- Prospect Hill, Waltham, Massachusetts
- Prospect Hill, an historic hill in Somerville, Massachusetts – see Union Square
- Prospect Hill, an elevation in Augusta, New York
- Prospect Hill (Delaware County, New York), a mountain located in the Catskill Mountains of New York
- Prospect Hill, an elevation in Kirkland, New York

=== Other places in the United States ===
- Prospect Hill (B&M station), Somerville, Massachusetts
- Prospect Hill Cemetery (North Omaha, Nebraska)

== See also ==
- Prospect Hill Academy Charter School, Cambridge, Massachusetts
- Prospect Hill virus
- Prospect Hill Historic District (disambiguation)
- Prospect Hill Cemetery (disambiguation)
