= 1921–22 Brooklyn Visitations season =

- League: Metropolitan Basketball League (original)
- Head coach: John Donlon
- General manager: John Donlon
- Owner(s): Unknown (John Donlon?)
- Arena: Grand Prospect Hall

Results
- Record: 9–11 (.450)
- Place: Conference: T–4th
- Playoff finish: Did not qualify (No playoffs were officially held properly this season.)

The 1921–22 Brooklyn Visitations season was both their first ever professional basketball season in Brooklyn, New York and their first ever overall season in the (original version of the) Metropolitan Basketball League, which would actually be created during this particular season here. When joining the Metropolitan Basketball League, the Visitations would join the (mostly) regional teams of the area in both the fellow Brooklyn-based Brooklyn Dodgers basketball team and the Brooklyn Prospect Power Five (which were sometimes just shortened down to the Brooklyn Pros instead) alongside the nearby Greenport, New York based Greenpoint Knights of St. Anthony, the New York City based New York MacDowell Lyceum, and the Paterson, New Jersey based Paterson Power Brothers Five (which were sometimes shortened down to either the Power Brothers or just the Powers instead) as one of six teams to help create the league under the leadership of future Naismith Basketball Hall of Famer John J. O'Brien and William Colgan. Not only that, but the MBL would decide to utilize a proper regular season format as opposed to the split season formatting that some professional basketball leagues of the time would utilize for one reason or another (though it would also be a league that allowed for double dribbling to occur alongside utilizing an indoor cage for the sport, which was considered part of the rules for the sport of basketball at the time). As a result of this decision, however, the MBL would have a championship series occur between the two best teams of the league, regardless of if they had a tied record for the season or not. Unfortunately for the Visitations, they would not be one of the two qualifying teams in the MBL this time around, as they would end up having a below-average 9–11 record that tied the Greenpoint Knights of St. Anthony for a fourth place finish that barely had them both ahead of only the lowly Paterson Power Brothers Five team. Not only that, but the championship series that was planned between the two best teams this season in the Brooklyn Dodgers basketball team and the New York MacDowell Lyceum team would end up being called off when the New York squad had their players go on strike for the purpose of better payment towards the players' ends since the MBL would only allow three previously established professional basketball players for each team for the purpose of keeping salaries down for the teams' ends; this led to the Brooklyn Dodgers basketball team being declared the league's inaugural champions by default, which would place a negative first impression for the MBL under its initial run, though they would still continue going due in part to perceived weaknesses within the bigger (rivaling) and longer established Eastern Basketball League that the Original Celtics Hall of Fame team would help exploit.

== Roster ==
Due to information on older professional basketball leagues being generally hard (if not outright impossible these days) to find for players from leagues like the Metropolitan Basketball League, there are bound to be more gaps and/or inaccuracies found in certain areas on the team's roster spots than usual.

1921–22 Brooklyn Visitations roster
Players

Pos.	No.	Player	Height	Weight	DOB	From
G/F		Babe Artus	6 ft 0 in (1.83 m)	200 lb (91 kg)	1898-11-20	No college
G/F		Eddie Burke	5 ft 9 in (1.75 m)	160 lb (73 kg)	1894-09-03	Boys HS (NY)
G/F		Rody Cooney	5 ft 8 in (1.73 m)	140 lb (64 kg)	1902-05-17	No college
F/C		Harry Dadson	6 ft 0 in (1.83 m)	170 lb (77 kg)	1892-11-20	No college
C		Horse Haggerty	6 ft 4 in (1.93 m)	225 lb (102 kg)	1891-07-04	No college
C		Joe Lapchick	6 ft 5 in (1.96 m)	185 lb (84 kg)	1900-04-12	No college
F		Leap Leary	5 ft 9 in (1.75 m)	150 lb (68 kg)	1898-12-18	No college
G		Bee McAllister	5 ft 6 in (1.68 m)	150 lb (68 kg)	Unknown	No college
F		Eddie White	5 ft 11 in (1.80 m)	165 lb (75 kg)	1894	No college

Coaches
Head coach

John Donlon

Legend
- (DP) Unsigned draft pick
- (FA) Free agent
- (S) Suspended
- Injured

== Metropolitan Basketball League Standings ==
Pos.	League Standings	Wins	Losses	Win %
T–1	Brooklyn Dodgers	12	8	.600
T–1	New York MacDowell Lyceum	12	8	.600
3	Brooklyn Prospect Big Five / Pros	11	9	.550
T–4	Brooklyn Visitations	9	11	.450
T–4	Greenpoint Knights of St. Anthony	9	11	.450
6	Paterson Power Brothers Five / Powers	7	13	.350

The Brooklyn Dodgers basketball team were later declared the league's champion by default once the New York MacDowell Lyceum team ended up going on a player's strike in hopes of improving their financial situations there (with a financial raise going from $25 per game in the regular season to $40 per game during the MBL's championship series).
