= 1925–26 Brooklyn Visitations season =

- League: Metropolitan Basketball League (original)
- Head coach: John Donlon
- General manager: John Donlon
- Arena: Grand Prospect Hall

Results
- Record: 16–14 (.533)
- Place: Conference: 5th/6th (1st half); T–1st (2nd half)
- Playoff finish: Did not qualify (Lost second half first place tiebreaker series 2–0 to the Greenpoint Knights of St. Anthony.)

The 1925–26 Brooklyn Visitations season was both their fifth professional basketball season in Brooklyn, New York and their fifth overall season in the (original version of the) Metropolitan Basketball League. Entering this season, the Metropolitan Basketball League its presence as a major national basketball league get decreased a fair bit when the newly rivaling American Basketball League would create what would be described as the first ever truly national professional basketball league after most other professional basketball leagues of the early era like the Metropolitan Basketball League would be more like regional professional basketball leagues instead of actually national basketball leagues for the time. With that being said, the MBL would end up trying to grow as a proper professional basketball league despite that immediate professional threat and the league seeing the Trenton (Royal) Bengals drop out of the league this season as they would get new teams in Newark, New Jersey and New York City in the Newark Bears and the New York Pros respectively, as well the Yonkers Chippewas being rebranded into the Yonkers Indians and the Kingston Colonials moving their operations to Perth Amboy, New Jersey to become the Perth Amboy Mets (though they might have been known as the Perth Amboy Amboyans instead) going forward as well in order to have seven teams competing in the league this season. Unfortunately for the Visitations, they would end up having a poor start to their season with their first half of the season by having a below-average 8–13 record to finish the season in what can be considered either a fifth place or sixth place team (depending on whether one would count the New York Pros' 5–4 record as a part of the official standings for the season), as they would only be ahead of the Newark Bears for the first half of the season. Luckily for the Visitations, they would end up going nearly undefeated in the second half of the season (which also saw the Perth Amboy Mets/Amboyans move away from Perth Amboy to Passaic, New Jersey on January 26, 1926 to become the Passaic Mets for the rest of the season going forward instead) with an 8–1, though they would also be tied with the Greenpoint Knights of St. Anthony for that half of the season due to them also having a nearly undefeated 8–1 on their ends as well. This ended up resulting in the Visitations competing in a second half first place tiebreaker series against the Greenpoint Knights of St. Anthony, though they unfortunately ended up losing 2–0 to the Greenpoint franchise (with their first game lost being a close 28–27 defeat at home and the second loss being a more brutal 22–15 beatdown on the road), with Greenpoint later winning the league's championship series 2–1 over the first half champion Yonkers Indians (with the third game specifically being played in the nearby city of Brooklyn as a neutral site instead of in Greenpoint), thus preventing the Brooklyn Visitations from having a threepeat in the MBL in the process.

== Roster ==
Due to information on older professional basketball leagues being generally hard (if not outright impossible these days) to find for players from leagues like the Metropolitan Basketball League, there are bound to be more gaps and/or inaccuracies found in certain areas on the team's roster spots than usual.

1925–26 Brooklyn Visitations roster
Players

Pos.	No.	Player	Height	Weight	DOB	From
G/F		Davey Banks	5 ft 7 in (1.70 m)	155 lb (70 kg)	1901-01-04	No college
F		Joseph Brennan	6 ft 0 in (1.83 m)	175 lb (79 kg)	1900-11-15	St. Augustine HS (NY)
G/F		Eddie Burke	5 ft 9 in (1.75 m)	160 lb (73 kg)	1894-09-03	Boys HS (NY)
F/C		Bob Griebe	6 ft 2 in (1.88 m)	190 lb (86 kg)	1895-03-07	No college
C		Swede Grimstead	6 ft 3 in (1.91 m)	190 lb (86 kg)	1891-03-23	No college
F		Willie McDonald			1904	No college
G		Willie Scrill	5 ft 10 in (1.78 m)	175 lb (79 kg)	1907-09-01	No college
G/F		Bucky Williams	5 ft 7 in (1.70 m)	155 lb (70 kg)	1904-02-04	No college

Coaches
Head coach

John Donlon

Legend
- (DP) Unsigned draft pick
- (FA) Free agent
- (S) Suspended
- Injured

== Metropolitan Basketball League Standings ==
First Half
Team	Wins	Losses	Winning %
Yonkers Indians	15	6	.714
Paterson Legionnaires	14	7	.667
New York Pros†	5	4	.556
Greenpoint Knights of St. Anthony	11	10	.524
Perth Amboy Mets*	8	11	.421
Brooklyn Visitations	8	13	.381
Newark Bears	4	14	.222

† – The New York Pros would end up dropping out of the Metropolitan Basketball League on December 7, 1925.
* – The Perth Amboy Mets (who might have been known as the Perth Amboy Amboyans either as well or instead) ended up moving out from Perth Amboy, New Jersey to nearby Passaic, New Jersey to become the Passaic Mets for the second half of the season instead.

Second Half
Team	Wins	Losses	Winning %
Brooklyn Visitations	8	1	.889
Greenpoint Knights of St. Anthony	8	1	.889
Yonkers Indians	4	5	.444
Paterson Legionnaires	4	6	.400
Newark Bears	1	7	.125
Passaic Mets*	0	5	.000

* – The Passaic Mets took on the place of the Perth Amboy Mets (who might have also played as the Perth Amboy Amboyans) for the second half of the season once the team moved from Perth Amboy to nearby Passaic, New Jersey for the rest of the season going forward.

== MBL Playoffs ==
Due to the Brooklyn Visitations and the Greenpoint Knights of St. Anthony tying for first place in the second half of the season despite them both nearly being undefeated throughout that entire half of this particular season, this season would technically be marketed as an equivalent of the MBL playoffs occurring instead of straight up defaulting into the MBL's championship series only for this season due to the structure of the split season format at hand.

=== MBL Second Half First Place Tiebreaker Series ===
Despite both the Brooklyn Visitations and the Greenpoint Knights of St. Anthony nearly being undefeated by the time the second half of this season concluded (likely due to each of them losing one game against each other during that particular half of the season), the MBL would have those two competing in a best-of-three series, with the winning team in this series being able to automatically qualify for the ABL's championship series as the second half first place team competing against the first half first place team this season, the Yonkers Indians. Unfortunately for the Visitations, they would end up being swept by the Greenpoint Knights of St. Anthony (though the dates for the two games are currently unknown and are potentially lost to time in the process) and fail to qualify for the championship series, which would be the official playoffs for the ABL properly during their existence in that league. Even worse for the Visitations, the Greenpoint Knights of St. Anthony would end up winning the MBL's championship series following the tiebreaker series played from March 27-April 6, 1926, with the final game in that series ironically being played in Brooklyn instead of in Greenpoint.

- Game 1 @ Brooklyn: Greenpoint Knights of St. Anthony 28, Brooklyn Visitations 27
- Game 2 @ Greenpoint: Greenpoint Knights of St. Anthony 22, Brooklyn Visitations 15
