= 1937–38 Brooklyn Visitations season =

- League: American Basketball League (revived original)
- Head coach: John Donlon
- General manager: John Donlon
- Owner(s): Unknown (John Donlon?)
- Arena: Grand Prospect Hall

Results
- Record: 15–25 (.375)
- Place: Conference: 3rd (1st half); 6th (2nd half)
- Playoff finish: Did not qualify

The 1937–38 Brooklyn Visitations season was their seventeenth professional basketball season in Brooklyn, New York, as well as their fifth season in what would be the revived version of the American Basketball League (though if one were to include the original ABL seasons they played in with the revived version of the ABL, the Visitations would appear in eight total seasons (seven full total seasons) within the combined operations of the American Basketball League instead). For the last time in the Visitations' history within the revived version of the ABL, this season would see the ABL utilize the split season format once again with the Brooklyn Visitations staying in Brooklyn for the entire season, though this season originally saw seven teams competing in the revived league this time around before it decreased down to six teams by the start of the second half of the season once the basketball version of the New York Yankees ended up leaving the ABL by the end of the first half of the season. On that note, despite this team not having future Naismith Basketball Hall of Famer Bobby McDermott on the team at all, during the first half of the season, the Visitations would end that half of the season with an above-average 13–10 record, which would be the last time they would finish a half of a season with a winning record. However, that record would still end up placing them behind the New Haven / New York Jewels and the Jersey Reds during this half season. Worse yet, the second half of the season would see the Visitations perform even worse as a team somehow, as they would only win two total games for that half of the season for a very poor 2–15 for a dead last finish to end the season on a poor note. Because Brooklyn failed to win the first half of the season in spite of their poor record for the second half of the season, the Visitations would fail to qualify for the ABL championship series once again.

== Roster ==
Due to information on American Basketball League players being generally hard to find, there are bound to be more gaps and/or inaccuracies found in certain areas on the team's roster spots than usual.

1937–38 Brooklyn Visitations roster
Players

Pos.	No.	Player	Height	Weight	DOB	From
F/C		Howie Bollerman	6 ft 8 in (2.03 m)	200 lb (91 kg)	1907-06-09	Colgate
F		Frank Conaty	6 ft 2 in (1.88 m)	164 lb (74 kg)	1909-12-30	No college
G		Allie Esposito	5 ft 10 in (1.78 m)	165 lb (75 kg)	1914-03-23	New Utrecht HS (NY)
G/F		Nat Frankel	6 ft 0 in (1.83 m)	195 lb (88 kg)	1913-11-03	Brooklyn
G		Freddie Gerken	5 ft 9 in (1.75 m)	150 lb (68 kg)	1911-11-01	No college
G		Rip Gerson	5 ft 10 in (1.78 m)	165 lb (75 kg)	1906-04-06	St. John's
F		Matt Guokas	6 ft 3 in (1.91 m)	195 lb (88 kg)	1915-11-11	Saint Joseph's
F/C		Dixie Lee	6 ft 0 in (1.83 m)	170 lb (77 kg)	1917	No college
G		Venty Leib	5 ft 9 in (1.75 m)	160 lb (73 kg)	1912-04-18	NYU
F		Frank McGuire	6 ft 0 in (1.83 m)	200 lb (91 kg)	1913-11-08	St. John's
F		Bill Nash	6 ft 2 in (1.88 m)		1913-01-13	Columbia
G		Jack O'Hare			Unknown	No college
G		Joe Polcha	5 ft 11 in (1.80 m)	170 lb (77 kg)	1917-02-24	No college
G		George Slott	5 ft 11 in (1.80 m)	185 lb (84 kg)	1912-06-09	St. John's
F/C		Bob Synnott	6 ft 3 in (1.91 m)	190 lb (86 kg)	1912-09-27	Theodore Roosevelt HS (NY)

Coaches
Head coach

John Donlon

Legend
- (DP) Unsigned draft pick
- (FA) Free agent
- (S) Suspended
- Injured

== American Basketball League Standings ==
First Half
Team	Wins	Losses	Winning %
Jersey Reds	16	6	.727
New Haven Jewels / New York Jewels^{[a]}	12	8	.600
Brooklyn Visitations	13	10	.565
Philadelphia SPHAs	12	10	.545
New York (Original) Celtics	11	10	.524
Kingston Colonials	5	15	.250
New York Yankees^{[b]}	1	11	.083

Second Half
Team	Wins	Losses	Winning %
New York Jewels^{[a]}	14	5	.737
Jersey Reds	13	7	.650
Philadelphia SPHAs	11	9	.550
Kingston Colonials	9	9	.500
New York (Original) Celtics	7	11	.389
Brooklyn Visitations	2	15	.118

== Notes ==
^{a} Before the season began, the Brooklyn Jewels moved from Brooklyn, New York to New Haven, Connecticut to become the New Haven Jewels to start out the season. However, on November 30, 1937, the team moved back from New Haven to Brooklyn to once again return to their original New York Jewels name for the rest of the season.
^{b} The New York Yankees basketball team would drop out of the ABL on January 11, 1938 during the first half of the season.
