= 1938–39 Brooklyn Visitations season =

- League: American Basketball League (revived original)
- Head coach: John Donlon
- General manager: John Donlon
- Arena: Grand Prospect Hall

Results
- Record: 7–20 (.259)
- Place: Conference: 7th
- Playoff finish: Did not qualify

The 1938–39 Brooklyn Visitations season was their eighteenth and final professional basketball season in Brooklyn, New York, as well as their sixth and final season in what would be the revived version of the American Basketball League (though if one were to include the original ABL seasons they played in with the revived version of the ABL, the Visitations would appear in nine total seasons (eight full total seasons) within the combined operations of the American Basketball League instead). Unlike most other seasons that the Visitations competed in, this season would see them compete in a proper regular season format where the best four teams would compete in a proper playoff format with a semifinal round for the best four teams and a championship round for the best two teams remaining afterward. Not only that, but the ABL would also see the number of teams increase out to eight teams this season, which would signal that the effects of the Great Depression were either waning or outright ending altogether going forward here. Unfortunately for the Visitations, they would not be one of the teams to wind up escaping from the Great Depression's long-term effects when it was all said and done. This season would end up becoming the worst overall season for the Visitations franchise in terms of overall production at hand, as they would end up finishing their only proper, full season within the ABL with a poor 7–20 record for a seventh place finish that had them only ahead of the Washington Heurichs works team expansion franchise for this season by two more losses at hand. Following this season's conclusion, the Brooklyn Visitations would end up closing operations with the ABL, as they would ultimately never become a professional basketball franchise ever again afterward (although its suggested that they would instead move operations to Baltimore, Maryland to become the Baltimore Clippers).

== Roster ==
Due to information on American Basketball League players being generally hard to find, there are bound to be more gaps and/or inaccuracies found in certain areas on the team's roster spots than usual.

1938–39 Brooklyn Visitations roster
Players

Pos.	No.	Player	Height	Weight	DOB	From
F/C		Howie Bollerman	6 ft 8 in (2.03 m)	200 lb (91 kg)	1907-06-09	Colgate
F		Frank Conaty	6 ft 2 in (1.88 m)	164 lb (74 kg)	1909-12-30	No college
G		Allie Esposito	5 ft 10 in (1.78 m)	165 lb (75 kg)	1914-03-23	New Utrecht HS (NY)
G/F		Nat Frankel	6 ft 0 in (1.83 m)	195 lb (88 kg)	1913-11-03	Brooklyn
F		Matt Guokas	6 ft 3 in (1.91 m)	195 lb (88 kg)	1915-11-11	Saint Joseph's
G		Tony Kappen	5 ft 10 in (1.78 m)	165 lb (75 kg)	1919-04-13	Forest Hills HS (NY)
G		Tony Krygier	5 ft 11 in (1.80 m)	170 lb (77 kg)	1915-09-25	Newtown HS (NY)
G		Venty Leib	5 ft 9 in (1.75 m)	160 lb (73 kg)	1912-04-18	NYU
F		Bill Nash	6 ft 2 in (1.88 m)		1913-01-13	Columbia
F		John O'Brien	6 ft 1 in (1.85 m)	210 lb (95 kg)	1916-07-25	Columbia
G		Jerry Otskey	5 ft 10 in (1.78 m)	160 lb (73 kg)	1918-04-09	St. Francis College
G		Joe Polcha	5 ft 11 in (1.80 m)	170 lb (77 kg)	1917-02-24	No college
F/C		Bob Synnott	6 ft 3 in (1.91 m)	190 lb (86 kg)	1912-09-27	Theodore Roosevelt HS (NY)

Coaches
Head coach

John Donlon

Legend
- (DP) Unsigned draft pick
- (FA) Free agent
- (S) Suspended
- Injured

== American Basketball League Standings ==
Pos.	League Standings	Wins	Losses	Win %
1	Kingston Colonials	28	7	.800
2	Philadelphia SPHAs	24	9	.727
3	Jersey Reds	19	14	.576
4	New York Jewels	19	15	.559
5	Wilkes-Barre Barons	14	22	.389
6	Troy Haymakers	12	21	.364
7	Brooklyn Visitations	7	20	.259
8	Washington Heurichs	7	22	.241

The top four teams would later compete in a playoff format this season, with the best team competing against the third-best team and the second-best team competing against the fourth-best team through a best-of-three series in the semifinal round before the winning two teams from each round would go up against each other in a best-of-three championship series.
