= David Tobey =

David or Dave Tobey may refer to:

- Dave Tobey (American football) (born 1943), American football linebacker
- Dave Tobey (basketball) (1898–1988), American basketball referee
