= Prospect Hill Historic District =

Prospect Hill Historic District may refer to:

- Prospect Hill Historic District (New Haven, Connecticut), listed on the NRHP in New Haven County, Connecticut
- Prospect Hill Historic District (Willimantic, Connecticut), listed on the NRHP in Windham County, Connecticut
- Prospect Hill Historic District (Bloomington, Indiana)
- Prospect Hill Historic District (Cincinnati, Ohio), a historic district also known as Prospect Hill, listed on the NRHP in Hamilton County, Ohio
- Prospect Hill (Arlington, Virginia), a former historic mansion whose site is a local historic district
- Prospect Hill Historic District (Janesville, Wisconsin), listed on the NRHP in Rock County, Wisconsin
- Prospect Hill Historic District (Milwaukee, Wisconsin), listed on the NRHP in Milwaukee County, Wisconsin
- Prospect Hill Historic District (Buffalo, New York), listed on the NRHP in Buffalo, New York

== See also ==
- Prospect Hill (disambiguation)
