= Prospect Hill Cemetery =

Prospect Hill Cemetery may refer to:

- Prospect Hill Cemetery (Millis, Massachusetts), listed on the NRHP in Massachusetts
- Prospect Hill Cemetery (Omaha, Nebraska), a pioneer cemetery in Omaha, Nebraska
- Prospect Hill Cemetery, location of Prospect Hill Cemetery Building, Guilderland, New York, listed on the National Register of Historic Places in Albany County, New York
- Prospect Hill Cemetery (Schuylerville, New York) in Saratoga County, NY
- Prospect Hill Cemetery (York, Pennsylvania)
- Prospect Hill Cemetery (Brattleboro, Vermont) in Windham County, Vermont
- Prospect Hill Cemetery (Washington, D.C.), a historic German-American cemetery
