= Prospect Terrace Apartments =

Historic residential building in Arkansas, United States

- U.S. National Register of Historic Places
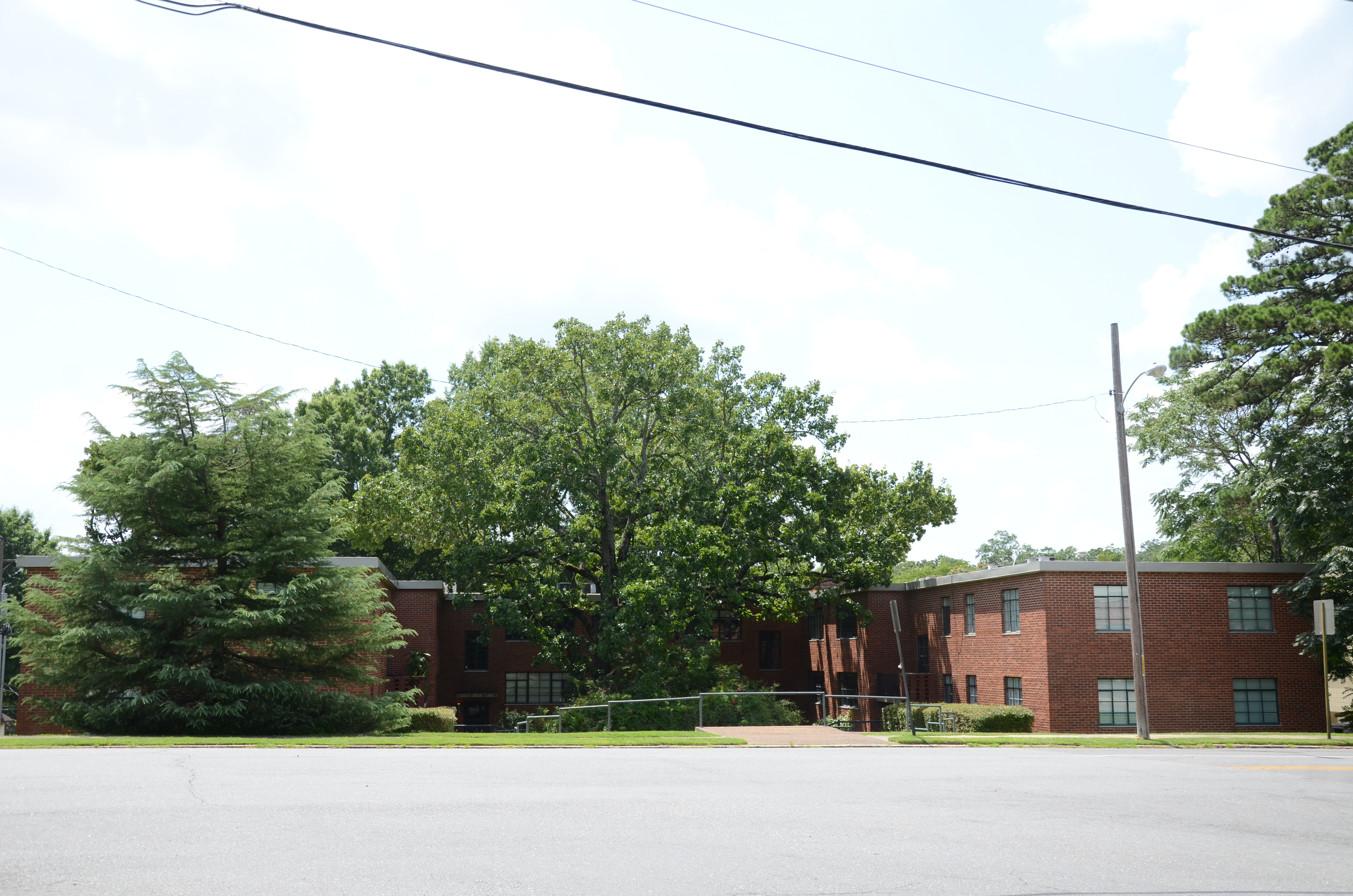

- Location within Arkansas Location within the United States
- Location: 3603 Kavanaugh Blvd., Little Rock, Arkansas
- Coordinates: 34°45′43″N 92°19′53″W
- Area: less than one acre
- Built: 1947
- Architect: Edwin B. Cromwell
- Architectural style: International Style
- NRHP reference No.: 02001043
- Added to NRHP: September 12, 2002

The Prospect Terrace Apartments are a historic apartment complex at 3603 Kavanaugh Boulevard in Little Rock, Arkansas. It is a U-shaped two-story brick structure, with a partial concrete basement due to a sloping lot. It is in the austere International Style, with little exterior ornamentation, steel-clad windows, and a flat roof. It was constructed using a design from Edwin B. Cromwell, who was also the first owner of the apartment complex. The building consists of nineteen different housing units.

The apartments were listed on the National Register of Historic Places in 2002.

== See also ==
- National Register of Historic Places listings in Little Rock, Arkansas
