= Prospect Hill (Delaware County, New York) =

Mountain in New York

- Location within New York Location within the United States

Highest point
- Elevation: 2,569 feet (783 m)
- Coordinates: 42°09′45″N 74°58′30″W

Geography
- Location: Downsville, New York, U.S.
- Topo map: USGS Hamden

Prospect Hill is a mountain located in the Catskill Mountains of New York north-northeast of Downsville. Conklin Hill is located southeast, and Brace Hill is located southwest of Prospect Hill.
