= Brooklyn Visitations =

Former basketball team in Brooklyn, New York

The Brooklyn Visitations (also known as the Triangles) were an American basketball team based in Brooklyn, New York City, that was a member of both versions of the Metropolitan Basketball League, the original version of the National Basketball League that wasn't related to the NBL that eventually merged with the Basketball Association of America to become the National Basketball Association (especially since that version of the NBL essentially got strong-manned by the American Basketball League during their only season there), and both renditions of the original American Basketball League. The Visitations' home court was Prospect Hall, where fans were made to check their guns at the door. During the 1927/28 season, the Washington Palace Five would have their 7–15 record for what would unofficially be the first half of that season be transferred to the Visitations as the replacement team for the unofficial second half of the season, with the Visitations getting an 18–11 record for the rest of that season afterward.

After the 1935/36 season the team became the Paterson Visitations. Then, during the 1st half of the 1936/37 season, the team moved back to Brooklyn on November 21, 1936, and became the Brooklyn Visitations again.

== Year-by-year ==
Year	League	Reg. season	Playoffs
1921/22	MBL	4th	No playoff
1922/23	MBL	3rd (1st half); 5th (2nd half)	Did not qualify
1923/24	MBL	1st (1st half); 1st (2nd half)	Champions (No Playoffs)
1924/25	MBL	2nd (1st half); 1st (2nd half)	Champions
1925/26	MBL	5th (1st half); 2nd (2nd half)	Did not qualify
1926/27	NBL	2nd	N/A
1926/27	MBL	1st (1st half); 2nd (2nd half)	Champions
1927/28	MBL	3rd	No playoff
1927/28	ABL	3rd (Eastern)	Did not qualify
1928/29	ABL	3rd (1st half); 2nd (2nd half)	Did not qualify
1929/30	ABL	2nd (1st half); 4th (2nd half)	Did not qualify
1930/31	ABL	1st (1st half); 3rd (2nd half)	Champions
1932	MBL	T–1st	Champions
1932/33	MBL	3rd (1st half); 3rd (2nd half)	Did not qualify
1933/34	ABL	4th (1st half); 8th (2nd half)	Did not qualify
1934/35	ABL	3rd (1st half); T–1st (2nd half)	Champions
1935/36	ABL	3rd (1st half); 1st (2nd half)	Finals
1936/37	ABL	5th (1st half); 3rd (2nd half)	Did not qualify
1937/38	ABL	3rd (1st half); 6th (2nd half)	Did not qualify
1938/39	ABL	7th	Did not qualify
