= Prospect Hill (Arlington, Virginia) =

Coordinates: 38.86508333°N 77.06568333°W

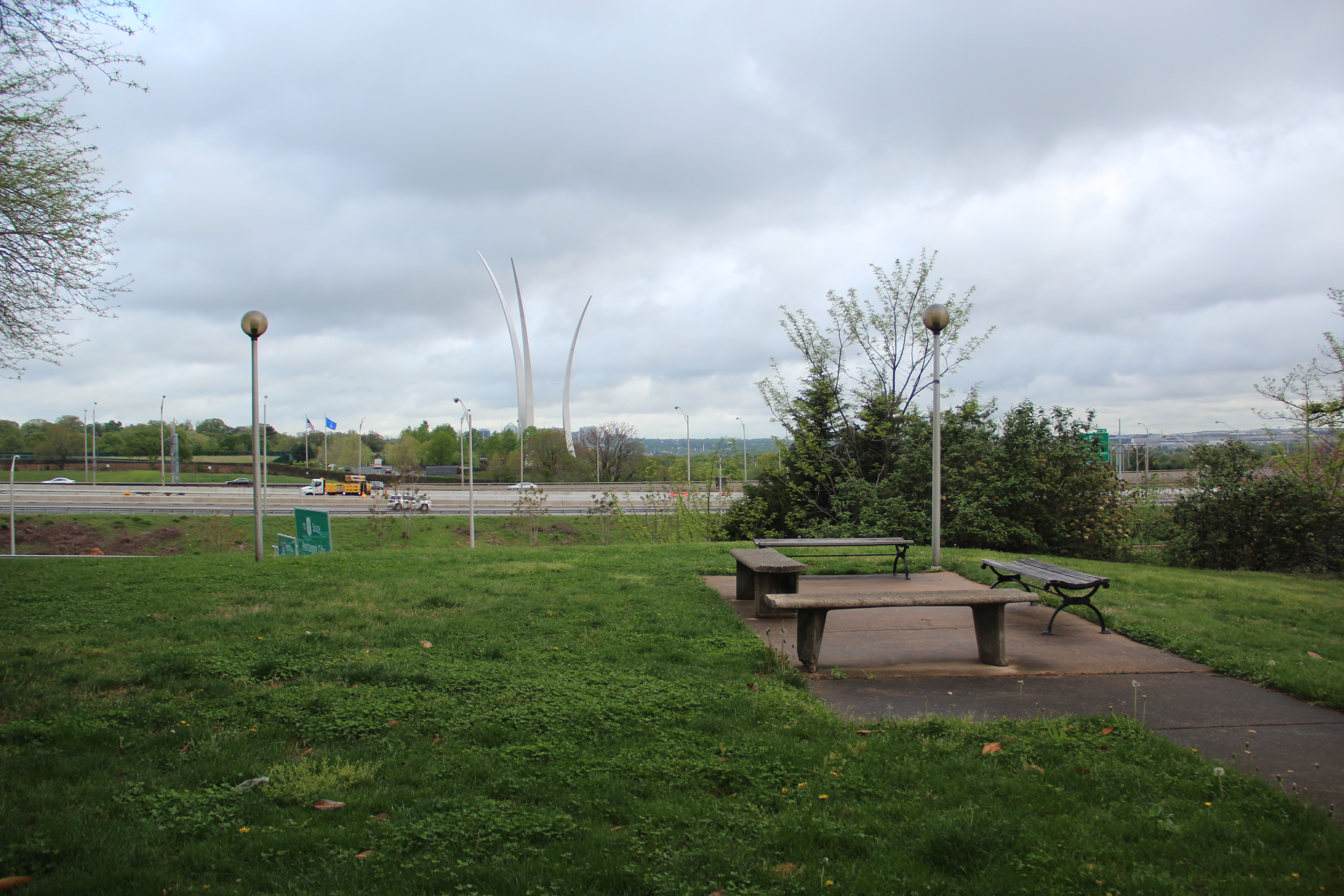
View from Prospect Hill

Prospect Hill in Arlington County, Virginia is the former location of a Federal style mansion built in 1841 by successful contractor James Roach in Arlington County (then named Alexandria County). The house was built on Arlington Ridge Road. In 1861, the land was seized and vandalized by Union soldiers during the construction of Fort Runyon and Fort Albany. The house was demolished in 1965, but an historic marker has been placed at the site. Roach had also supplied most of the materials for the Alexandria Canal, the Aqueduct Bridge, and the Alexandria, Loudoun and Hampshire Railroad.

After the September 11 attacks, Prospect Hill became a popular spot for photographs to take photos of The Pentagon after it was crashed into by American Airlines Flight 77.

The site is also home to the 0.4 acre Prospect Hill Park.
