= Dave Tobey (basketball) =

American basketball referee (1898–1988)

Dave Tobey

David Tobey (May 1, 1898 in New York, New York, United States – July 25, 1988) was an American basketball referee. He refereed many notable pro games in New York between 1918 and 1925. In 1926 he refereed the Syracuse vs. West Point game, which featured two future Hall of Famers, Vic Hanson and John Roosma. After that game he became popular and refereed many important games from 1926 to 1945, such as the first game with a three-man officiating crew (Georgetown vs. Columbia). After retirement from officiating, he became basketball coach at Cooper Union in New York City. He was enshrined in the Basketball Hall of Fame in 1961.
