= Joseph Brennan (basketball) =

American basketball player

Biographical details
- Born: November 15, 1900; Brooklyn, New York, U.S.
- Died: May 10, 1989 (aged 88); New York, New York, U.S.

Playing career
- 1919–1936: Brooklyn Visitations
- Position: Guard

Coaching career (HC unless noted)
- 1941–1948: St. Francis (NY)

Head coaching record
- Overall: 90–46
- Basketball Hall of Fame; Inducted in 1975

Joseph R. Brennan (November 15, 1900 – May 10, 1989) was an American professional basketball player. He is mostly known for his time with the Brooklyn Visitations, which he joined in 1919 and led to three ABL championships (1929, 1931 and 1935). After his playing career, he coached St. Francis College in Brooklyn for 7 seasons from 1941 to 1948. He was elected to the Naismith Memorial Basketball Hall of Fame in 1975.

== Biography ==
Joseph R. Brennan was born in Brooklyn on November 15, 1900. He attended High School at St. Augustine Academy and played basketball there for four years. When he graduated in 1919, he went directly to a professional basketball team: the all-Irish Brooklyn Visitations. At the time it was prevalent for players to compete on several teams in different leagues during the same season. As such, during Brennan's 19-year career he also played for Troy, New York of the New York State League, Holyoke, Massachusetts of the Massachusetts League, Philadelphia and Wilkes-Barre both of the Eastern League, and for the Brooklyn Jewels, the Brooklyn Whirlwinds and the Brooklyn Dodgers. The Brooklyn Visitations began in the Metropolitan League but later moved to the ABL. With the Visitations, Brennan won three ABL championships.

In 1936 he retired from professional basketball and began a college basketball coaching career with St. Francis College. Brennan during the 1920s and up until 1961 was an employee at Emigrant Savings Bank. This at times prevented him from playing in road games when he was an active basketball player during the 1920s and 30s. In 1961, when Brennan left Emigrant Savings Bank he was the vice-president and went on to become the president of Atlantic Savings and Loans Association of Brooklyn. He held that post until 1968 when he retired. Seven years later he was named to the Naismith Memorial Basketball Hall of Fame.

== St. Francis College ==
During Brennan's seven seasons the Terriers, playing in the Metropolitan New York Conference or as Independents, had a 90–46 record. Brennan has the highest win percentage as a head coach in Terrier basketball history at 66.2%.

=== Head coaching record ===
Record table
Season	Team	Overall	Conference	Standing	Postseason
St. Francis (NY) Terriers (Metropolitan New York Conference) (1941–1948)
1941–42	St. Francis (NY)	16–2			
1942–43	St. Francis (NY)	13–7	1–5	7th	
1943–44	St. Francis (NY)	10–6			
1944–45	St. Francis (NY)	9–9			
1945–46	St. Francis (NY)	12–6	3–2	4th	
1946–47	St. Francis (NY)	14–7	2–3	5th	
1947–48	St. Francis (NY)	16–9	2–3	6th	
St. Francis (NY):		90–46	8–13		
Total:		90–46			
