= Rody Cooney =

American basketball player and coach (1902–1965)

Personal information
- Born: May 17, 1902
- Died: September 29, 1965 (aged 63) New York, New York, U.S.
- Listed height: 5 ft 8 in (1.73 m)
- Listed weight: 140 lb (64 kg)

Career information
- High school: St. Francis Preparatory School (New York City, New York)
- Playing career: 1919–1936
- Position: Guard

Career history

Playing
- 1921–1922: Easthampton Hampers
- 1921–1925: Brooklyn Visitations
- 1925: Washington Palace Five
- 1925–1936: Brooklyn Visitations

Coaching
- 1932–1941: St. Francis (NY)
- 1946–1947: Yonkers Chiefs

Career highlights
- As player: 2x ABL champion (1931, 1935); 4× Metropolitan League champion (1924, 1925, 1927, 1932)

Roger Patrick "Rody" Cooney (May 17, 1902 – September 29, 1965) was an American basketball player and coach who played professional basketball for the Brooklyn Visitations and coached the St. Francis Brooklyn Terriers men's basketball team from 1932 to 1941.

== Playing ==
After leading St. Francis Preparatory School to the New York City CSAL basketball championship in 1919, Cooney embarked on a professional career. He was a member of the Brooklyn Visitations from 1921 to 1936 and appeared in games for the Washington Palace Five and Philadelphia Sphas. He was a member of the Brooklyn team that won the 1931 and 1935 American Basketball League championships and Metropolitan League titles in 1924, 1925, 1927 and 1932. He averaged 4.4 points per game in 417 games played in major professional leagues. Although he was not a leading scorer, Cooney was known for his defense, ball handling, and playmaking.

== Coaching ==
From 1932 to 1941, Cooney was the head basketball coach at St. Francis College. He compiled a 116–77 record and never had a losing season. In September 1941, Cooney resigned as St. Francis' head coach to take a job with United Aircraft in Hartford, Connecticut. He was recommended for the position by former Visitations teammate Bob Grody. Cooney recommended another Visitations teammate, Joseph Brennan, to take over the Terriers.

Cooney was the head coach of the ABL's Yonkers Chiefs during the 1946–47 season. The following season, he coached the Quaker Maid corporate team, which consisted of many of his former St. Francis players, to the Eastern Industrial League championship.
