= Grand Prospect Hall =

Commercial building in New York City (1901–2022)

- Prospect Hall
- U.S. National Register of Historic Places
- New York State Register of Historic Places
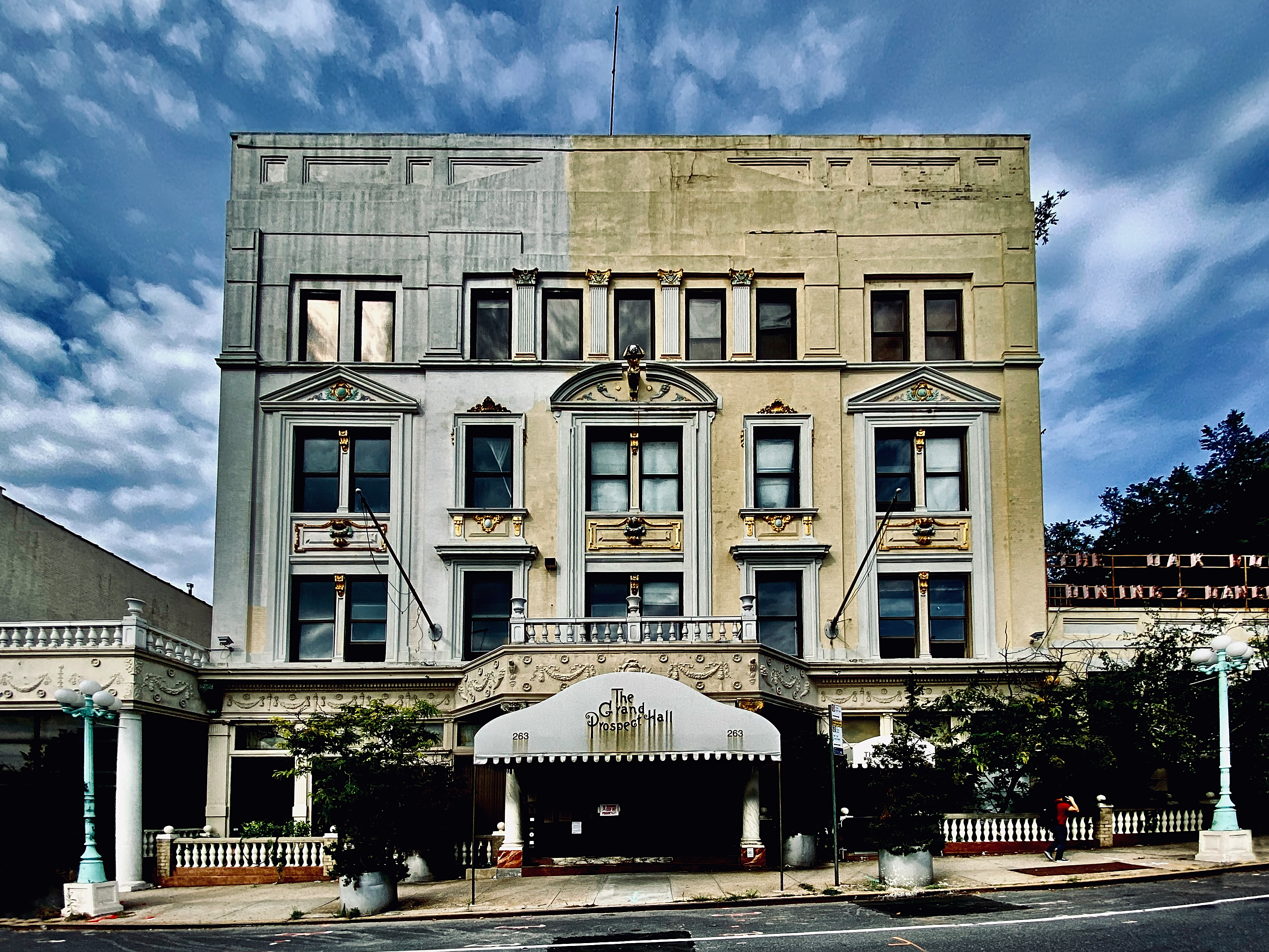
- Grand Prospect Hall, August 2021

- Location within New York City Location within New York Location within the United States
- Location: 263 Prospect Ave., Brooklyn, New York 11215
- Coordinates: 40°39′50″N 73°59′22″W
- Area: 1.5 acres (0.61 ha)
- Built: 1901
- Architects: Huberty, Ulrich J.
- Architectural style: French Renaissance
- NRHP reference No.: 99000460
- NYSRHP No.: 04701.013523

Significant dates
- Added to NRHP: April 15, 1999
- Designated NYSRHP: April 15, 1999

Grand Prospect Hall, also known as Prospect Hall, was a large Victorian-style banquet hall at 263 Prospect Avenue in the South Park Slope neighborhood of Brooklyn, New York City. It was primarily an event space, hosting weddings, bar and bat mitzvahs, and high-school proms. The hall was housed in a building that architect Ulrich J. Huberty designed in the French Renaissance style.

The first Prospect Hall was built in 1892 by local entrepreneur John Kolle. The original structure burned down in 1900 and was replaced by a new building, which opened in 1903. It was operated by the Kolle family through 1940, when John Kolle's son, William, sold the building to a Polish-American organization. Greek-American couple Michael and Alice Halkias bought the hall in 1981 and renovated it, gaining some local celebrity for their cheaply produced television commercials. In 2020, it was sold to contractor Angelo Rigas, who announced plans to demolish and redevelop it, along with adjacent properties. Local activists organized to save the building, but the effort was unsuccessful and Grand Prospect Hall was demolished in February 2022.

Grand Prospect Hall was four stories tall and faced in buff-gray brick, with pressed metal decoration that was originally colored to resemble limestone. The front portion of the building was arranged around a large central staircase and was designed with a bar, a banquet hall, and various reception and parlor rooms. The rear of the building was arranged around the ballroom, which was overlooked by two balcony levels. The basement also had facilities, including a bowling alley. The building was listed on the National Register of Historic Places.

== History ==
=== Original Prospect Hall ===
Prospect Hall was originally built by local entrepreneur John Kolle, a German immigrant. In 1890, he had built Tivoli Hall, a four-story concert hall in the part of South Brooklyn now known as Park Slope, for restaurateur Charles Feltman. The success of the Tivoli prompted Kolle to plan his own amusement hall. In May 1892, Kolle announced plans for Prospect Hall, which was intended to cater to the German societies and organizations of the area. It was to be located on Prospect Avenue, between Fifth and Sixth Avenues, a few blocks from Tivoli Hall. Prospect Hall was constructed at a cost of $130,000 (equivalent to $3,740,000 in 2020).

An 1893 report from the Brooklyn Citizen cited the building as measuring 65 by 160 ft (20 by 49 m), while a 1900 report from The New York Times said the building measured 75 by 200 ft (23 by 61 m). The structure contained six bowling alleys, four shooting galleries, a billiard parlor, dining room, and large ballroom. The ballroom featured a large stage and had a seating capacity for 1,000 people. The original Prospect Hall was the first such venue to be equipped with an electric lighting system. The Prospect Heights Athletic Club, a boxing club, formed at Prospect Hall shortly after it opened in November 1892. In its inaugural years, the hall hosted a range of events including plays, boxing tournaments, Knights of Columbus meetings, and fundraisers. John Kolle's son, William D. Kolle, managed the hall. By 1900, Prospect Hall served 55,000 Brooklyn residents who participated in theatrical productions.

On December 11, 1900, two hundred firefighters responded to a major fire at Prospect Hall. While the firefighters stopped the fire from spreading to neighboring buildings, the hall was destroyed. This was in part because, according to The New York Times, the two closest fire hydrants to the hall were frozen over. The bowling alleys on the ground and second floors formed natural flues for the flames and the fire spread very quickly, further aided by wind. While it had steel ceilings and iron girders, the walls were made of Georgia pine, and the stage and flooring of the hall contained flammable material. Only the brick and stone walls of the building were left standing, and they were ordered to be demolished afterward as they were too structurally unstable. The Brooklyn Daily Eagle described the fire as "spectacular", drawing thousands of people to watch. So despondent was John Kolle that he reportedly had to be restrained from jumping into the fire and killing himself, and later had to be looked after and medicated by physicians. The cause was not confirmed, but was suspected to be a lit cigar or cigarette thrown on the floor in one of the second floor dressing rooms near the main hall. The Eagle estimated the damage at over $300,000 (equivalent to $9,530,542 in 2025). Many of the hall's German societies lost trophies, keepsakes, and other property in the fire; they all sent letters of sympathy to Kolle.

=== Reconstructed Prospect Hall ===
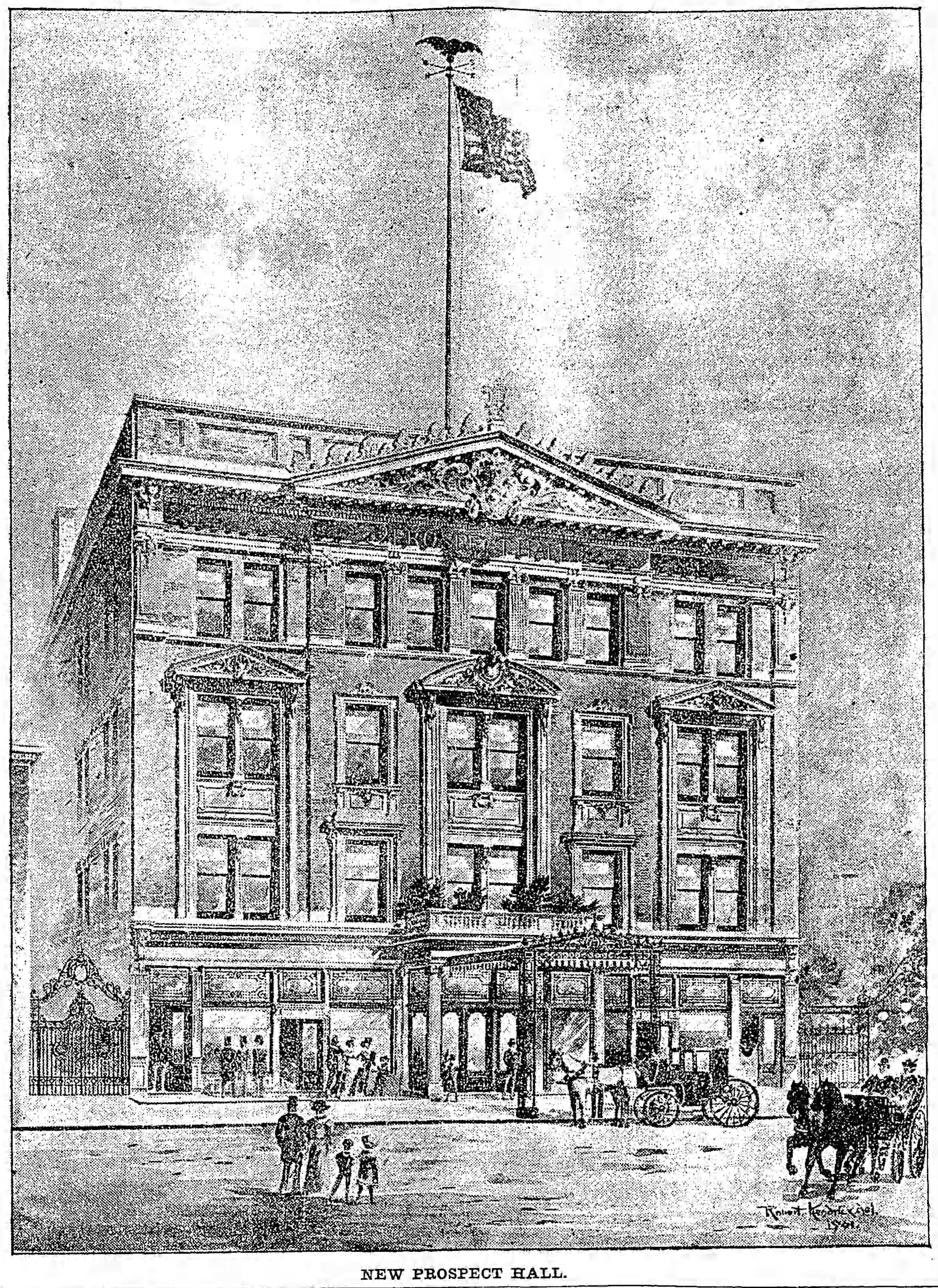
Sketch of the rebuilt Prospect Hall in the Brooklyn Daily Eagle in 1901, prior to its construction

==== Kolle ownership ====
John Kolle quickly decided to rebuild Prospect Hall on the same site and, in June 1901, opened a temporary beer garden next door. The New York City Buildings Department initially refused to grant a permit for the reconstruction because the blueprints included a drinking bar. According to building code, a bar could not operate on the same property as any building with stage facilities and over 300 seats. The owners appealed, and the Brooklyn buildings deputy commissioner indicated that he would approve the plans if the bar and some disallowed decorations were removed. In July 1901, the commissioner voted with the Board of Buildings to reverse his initial decision and approve the new plans.

The rebuilt Prospect Hall opened on February 2, 1903, and was also managed by John Kolle's son, William. Shortly after the hall's reopening, the building nearly caught fire again. A fire started in the Kolle family's adjacent home, nearly killing one of his daughters. Worried it would spread to the hall, the fire department sent an extra fire engine to help control it. While they successfully prevented damage to the hall, the house was destroyed. Firefighters had difficulty getting a sufficient stream of water due to a large eel which made its way into a fire hose, clogging it.

In its early years, according to the New York Times' Christopher Gray, spaces like Prospect Hall "sounded the heartbeat of the city" by hosting a variety of public and private events. It hosted political events like a rally held by William Randolph Hearst in 1906, a debate in 1907, an event featuring William Jennings Bryan in 1908, and a gathering in support of local subway service which drew 3,500 people. Many international celebrities held performances there, like opera star Enrico Caruso, Lena Horne, Ginger Rogers, Fred Astaire, and others. In 1911, singer and comedian Sophie Tucker performed. Al Capone was known to have a box at the hall. The venue also hosted meetings for politicians and club leaders, with certain nights devoted to annual balls in honor of several leaders. Organizations such as the Brooklyn Quartet Club and Brooklyn Rifle Club were also housed in the building.

To the west of the main building, the Hour Motion Picture Theatre opened in 1910. The space to the east was converted into a Venetian garden in 1913 and was used for movie screenings. According to the New Yorker, it became one of the first film production lots in the world after one of John Kolle's sons, Herman Kolle, founded the Crescent Film Company with Fred J. Balshofer and began making movies for nickelodeons. Old advertisements for Prospect Hall described the "high-class motion pictures and vaudeville" that were displayed every night, as well as "country butcher shops" on Tuesdays and "safe and sane" Independence Day events every July 4. Over the years, the frequency of high-profile events at Prospect Hall, including political meetings, decreased. It continued to be used for events such as an October 1929 debate between mayor Jimmy Walker and ex-governor Al Smith, as well as Works Progress Administration productions during the 1930s. The main ballroom was used for vaudeville and movie screenings during the summer between 1936 and 1940.

==== White Eagle ownership ====
William L. Kolle, son of William D. Kolle, sold the building in 1940 to the White Eagle Society, a group formed by Polish immigrants. White Eagle converted it into a Polish-American community center. The organization repainted and repaired the building by 1949. Prospect Hall was used by fraternal societies and labor unions throughout this time. The immediate vicinity began to decline in the 1950s, following the construction of the Prospect Expressway immediately across the street.

White Eagle started to sell off some decorations by the 1960s to pay for repairs. By then, Prospect Hall hosted occasional boxing matches. The building, at that point known as the Polish Community Center, was renovated in 1970. The United Polish Societies of South Brooklyn called it their headquarters as of 1971, meeting one evening a month. Dances and concerts were also hosted in Prospect Hall until the 1970s. It was completely shuttered by 1981, at which point it had deteriorated so much that there were barrels throughout the space to catch rain from the leaking roof. The ground-floor restaurant saw little business but continued to operate nevertheless.

==== Halkias ownership ====
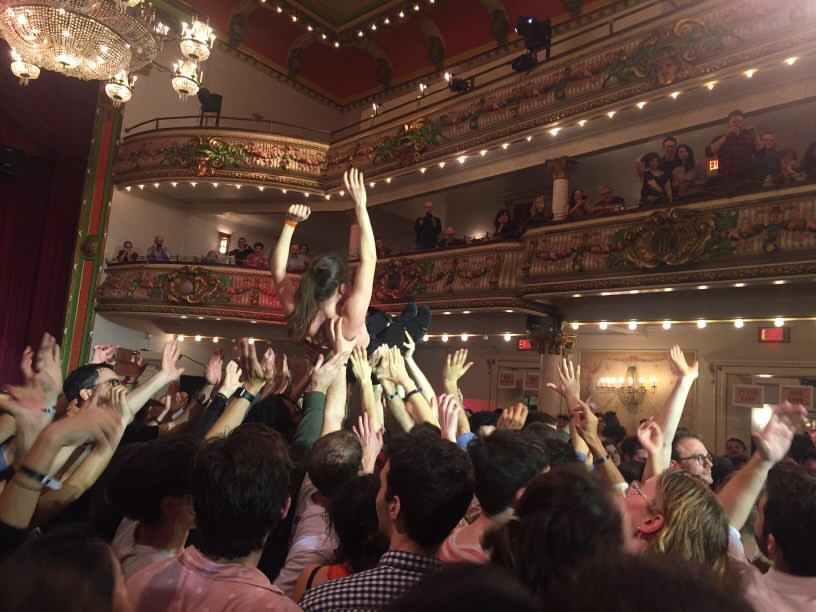
People dancing during the Zlatne Uste Golden Festival, a Balkan cultural event

Greek-American couple Michael and Alice Halkias bought the hall in 1981. Michael Halkias was born in Pittsburgh and grew up in Greece and Syria before coming back to the United States in 1966. He was a former real estate agent, travel agent, and employment agent who helped Greek people immigrate to the United States. He also worked in radio, advertising, and publishing before purchasing the hall. Under the Halkiases' ownership, Prospect Hall was renamed Grand Prospect Hall. The couple renovated the hall in a piecemeal fashion over the following 18 years, with a staff of 30 to 90 restorers. Michael Halkias chose to redesign the main ballroom in "happy colors" rather than the original paint scheme, with carvings of fruit in different colors based on what he shouted to the painters. Brownstoner wrote that "the Halkias' never met gilding and ostentation that they didn't like". Michael also attempted to clean the facade several times, but ultimately decided to paint it in 1998. He recovered the original murals after a chance encounter while waiting in line at a bank in Bay Ridge, Brooklyn, when a stranger mentioned that he had purchased them.

In 1983, Borough President Howard Golden proclaimed March 10 to be an annual "Grand Prospect Hall Day" in Brooklyn. Starting in 1986, the Halkiases gained a measure of local fame for producing and starring in cheaply shot commercials for the hall which aired regularly on local television. The ads contained various shots of the interior spaces, showing events held there, set to orchestral music, with a sales pitch from the Halkiases typically including a phrase which became associated with them: "We make your dreams come true!" The tagline, according to Brooklyn Paper, is "instantly recognizable to any New Yorker who owned a television set." The commercials have been parodied on both Jimmy Kimmel Live! and Saturday Night Live. Kimmel paired the Halkiases with Pete Alonso of the New York Mets, spoofing the commercials. Kimmel was quoted in The New York Times saying "If you live in New York, and if you've ever owned a television, you've probably seen these commercials," joking that they "are wonderful, but they've been running the same ones for 125 years."

In 1999, Grand Prospect Hall was listed on the National Register of Historic Places (NRHP). The listing describes the hall as "probably the largest and best-preserved example of its type, the Victorian assembly hall set within a great ethnic community facility, remaining in the country". However, NRHP status does not restrict what non-federal owners can do with a property. At the time, the building was not granted official city landmark status from the New York City Landmarks Preservation Commission (LPC), which would grant protections from redevelopment. In 2001, the Halkiases reopened the original bar on the first floor after restoring it.

The Halkiases proposed new construction on the property in 2011: an eleven-story building including a hotel and large parking garage. Local residents objected to the development on the grounds the new building would block sunlight. The Halkiases distributed flyers to convince people it was out of necessity, to continue focusing on nicer events rather than open up their venue to cheap, high-volume functions. The flyers upset some neighbors, who viewed it as a threat, while Michael Halkias described it as an economic necessity. The request for a zoning exception was not approved.

The hall was primarily an event space, hosting weddings, bar and bat mitzvahs, corporate events and high-school proms. The Halkiases rented the building as a filming location for films, TV shows, and commercials including The Cotton Club, Prizzi’s Honor, The Royal Tenenbaums, Gossip Girl, and season three of Twin Peaks. It has also hosted events such as Flame Con, an LGBTQ comic book convention, and the rock band Arcade Fire held an Everything Now album release concert there for 1,500 fans.

==== Sale to Rigas ====
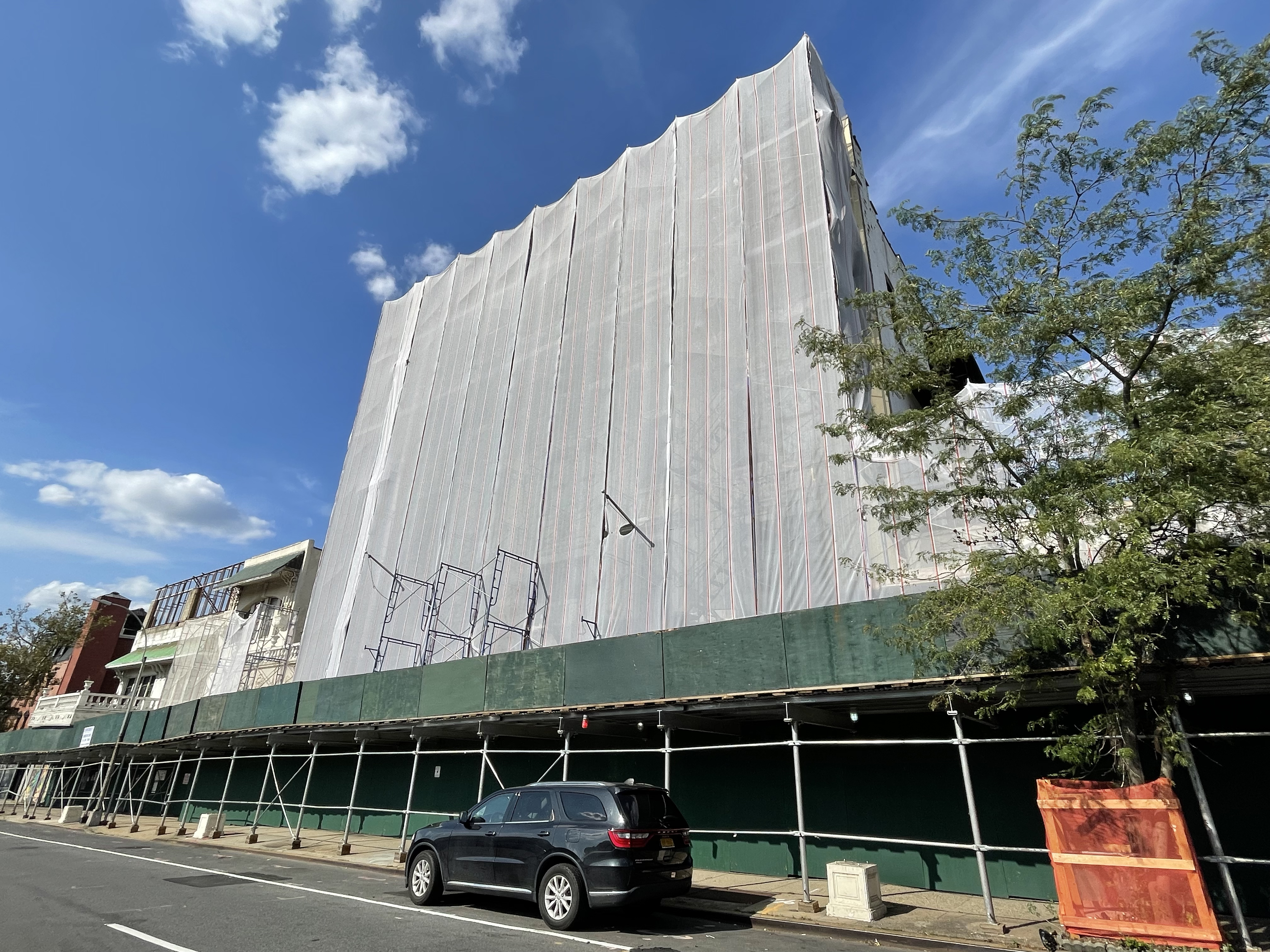
The hall covered in scaffolding in September 2021

Business suffered during the COVID-19 pandemic, and Grand Prospect Hall closed in March 2020. Two months later, on May 6, Michael Halkias died at the age of 82 due to complications from COVID-19. In June 2021, the building was sold, along with eleven other adjacent properties, to contractor Angelo Rigas for $30 million. The interior was largely auctioned off before the sale was announced, with some of the decorations and fixtures sold to other local businesses and antiques sellers.

On August 19, 2021, the Brooklyn Paper reported that Rigas, through Gowanus Cubes LLC, had filed permits to demolish the properties, including Grand Prospect Hall. Local activists began a petition to try to save the building from demolition and asked the LPC to hold hearings for landmark status. The petition gained 40,000 supporters, including city councilman Brad Lander, who described it as "a site of many memories and melodies for generations of Brooklynites". A judge issued an injunction to halt demolition in early September 2021, since a demolished building could not be considered for landmark status. However, the LPC refused to hold a hearing to consider the building for landmark status, since the exterior had been too extensively modified from its original design. Among the LPC's reasons for denying the request were that the fourth-floor pediment had been removed, the frieze above ground level had been modified, and the entrance portico had been enclosed. Much of the interior had also been demolished already.

The demolition permits were approved in November 2021, though at that time there was not a concrete timeline for it to move forward. Brooklyn Magazine reported in February 2022 that it would be replaced with a five-story residential building. The demolition was completed by February 25, 2022.

== Building ==
The later building was designed in the French Renaissance style by architect Ulrich J. Huberty, who also designed the Prospect Park Boathouse and Tennis House. The building carried the address 263 Prospect Avenue. Grand Prospect Hall faces the Prospect Expressway (NY 27) to the south. Originally, there was a beer garden around the building, which may have contained a Ferris wheel as well as an "electric tower", but these were removed around 1914.

=== Facade ===
The building was four stories tall and faced in buff-gray brick, with pressed metal decoration that was originally colored to resemble limestone. The windows were surmounted by pediments, while the top of the building had a cornice with a sculpted pediment in the center. The first floor was designed with storefronts, as well as an entrance with columns at the center; these were subsequently modified.

It was designed with a frontage of 75 ft (23 m) and a depth of 215 ft (66 m). A one-story annex continued east of the main structure. The side and rear facades were clad with brick and did not contain any ornamentation, while the roofs of the building were flat.

=== Features ===
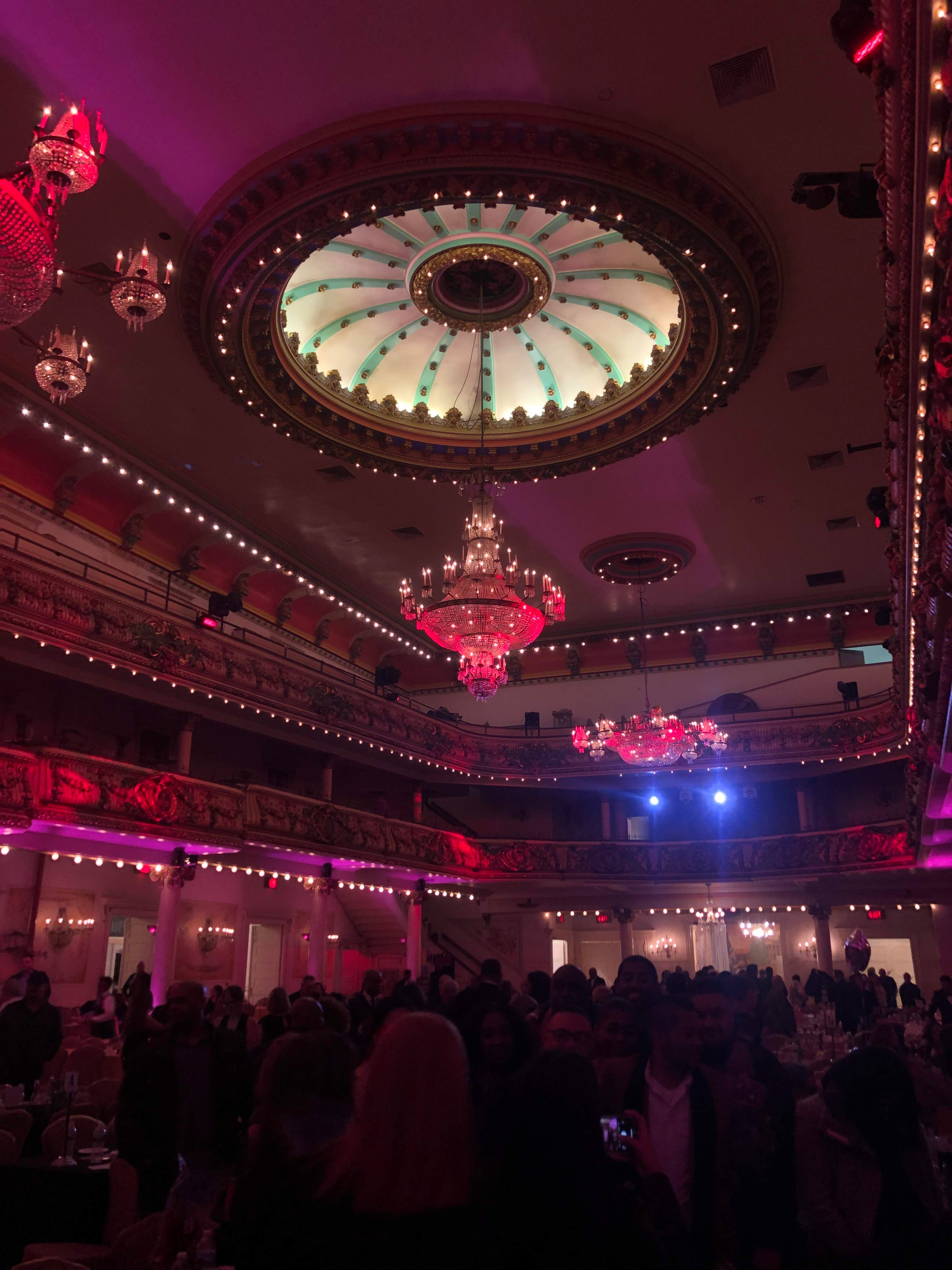
People in the ballroom during a Tito Nieves performance in March 2019

Grand Prospect Hall could fit 8,000 people in total, or 5,925 people when used as a dining venue. Covering 140,000 ft^{2} (13,000 m^{2}), it had several rooms including a garden area and a large ballroom. Grand Prospect Hall featured the first Otis bird cage elevator in New York and was the first fully electrified public building in Brooklyn. The elevator cab was constructed like a cage and was wrapped by a staircase on the western side of the building. The basement was also designed with a bowling alley, a billiard room, a kitchen, and a laundry. The bowling alley was divided into two sections and had fourteen lanes in total, though the bowling alley was long abandoned by 1999. Electric dynamos, engines, and boilers were installed beneath the sidewalk. There was also a roof garden.

The front portion of the building was arranged around a large central staircase. The main entrance was designed with an entryway measuring 18 ft (5.5 m) wide. The central staircase, made of cast iron with marble treads, connected the entrance foyer with a two-story-high hallway on an upper level. At the first landing was a pair of decorative box offices. The first floor of the front portion was designed with a restaurant, club room, "Alt Deutsche" beer hall, bar room, and women's parlor. The bar, east of the main staircase, had an oak countertop as well as a plaster and marble bar. There was also a banquet hall measuring 60 by 80 ft (18 by 24 m), which was spanned by large steel girders. The second floor of the front portion had a cafe, loggias, cloak rooms, and women's parlor. The third floor had more reception and cloak rooms and other women's parlors. The fourth floor had two elaborately decorated lodge rooms with auxiliary spaces, anterooms, and preparation rooms.

The rear of the building was arranged around the ballroom, which was at the top of the staircase. Measuring 68 by 125 ft (21 by 38 m) across by 40 ft (12 m) tall, The ballroom was variously cited as containing 1,500 or 1,700 seats. Two levels overlooked the space: a lower balcony and an upper gallery, both accessed by marble stairs. Both of these levels were supported on marble columns and surround the ballroom on all sides except the front. They had decorative elements such as garlands and cartouches. The balcony consisted of a set of theater boxes that are sloped slightly downward to the front of Grand Prospect Hall. It was designed with 26 private boxes and four larger proscenium boxes. The gallery had a steeper downward rake and contained wooden benches and plaster rails. The ceiling was mostly flat, though it was surrounded by a cove. The central dome, which contained direct and indirect lighting, was 35 ft (11 m) across. The rear of the ballroom, near the northern end, had a stage inside a plaster proscenium, which in turn had a cornice atop it. There were auxiliary spaces, such as dressing rooms, adjacent to the stage.

A one-story wing extended east of the main hall and was added not long after Grand Prospect Hall's rebuilding in 1902. Known as the rathskeller, it had been used as a restaurant since its opening. The walls of the rathskeller contained decorated oak paneling, canvas murals, and a tin ceiling.

== See also ==
- National Register of Historic Places listings in Brooklyn

== Bibliography ==
- "Grand Prospect Hall" (PDF). National Register of Historic Places, National Park Service. April 15, 1999.
