= 1934–35 New Britain Mules season =

- League: American Basketball League (revived original)
- Head coach: Honey Russell (9–9)
- General manager: Joe Fay(?); Honey Russell(?)
- Owner(s): Joe Fay(?); Honey Russell(?)
- Arena: New Britain Municipal Auditorium

Results
- Record: 9–9 (.500)
- Place: Conference: T–3rd (2nd half)
- Playoff finish: Did not qualify

The 1934–35 New Britain Mules season was technically both the fourth and final professional basketball season played for this franchise and the second and final season of the team that was playing in New Britain, Connecticut after they previously played as the Hoboken Lisas in the briefly revived Metropolitan Basketball League, the Hoboken Thourots from Hoboken, New Jersey, the Camden Brewers in Camden, New Jersey, and the New Britain Palaces in New Britain, Connecticut. However, this can also count as the only proper season of play for the New Britain Mules franchise instead since this team would be formed from two teams who were considered to be struggling with their operations at the time in the New Britain Jackaways and the Newark Mules, with the Mules deciding to move their operations from Newark, New Jersey to New Britain in order to comply with the merger at hand for the second half of the season. Originally, the two teams operated just under the recently rebranded New Britain Jackaways and the Newark Mules names under the first half of the season before the combined fourth and seventh place finishes for that half of the season in the new seven-team league led to the two teams merging operations with each other to become the New Britain Mules for the second half of the season only. (However, it is recently believed that the team playing in the second half of the season is really just the Newark Mules while representing New Britain, Connecticut for the ABL this season in place of the New Britain Jackaways due to the original Jackaways team folding operations on January 18, 1935.) In any case, once New Britain entered the second half of the season as the Mules instead of the Jackaways, the New Britain Mules would perform a fair bit better as a team post-merger during that half of the season than they did pre-merger either while competing as the New Britain Jackaways or Newark Mules, to the point where their overall placement would improve from last place (at 7th for New Britain (or 4th for the Newark Mules)) to tying for third place with the Jersey Reds, albeit with an average 9–9 record that still had them behind only the defending ABL champion Philadelphia SPHAs / Hebrews and the Brooklyn Visitations for a first place tie there. As a result of that finish, the New Britain Mules would not only fail to qualify for the ABL's championship series, but they would also withdraw their operations from the league entirely following the season's conclusion as well.

== Roster ==
Due to information on American Basketball League players being generally hard to find, there are bound to be more gaps and/or inaccuracies found in certain areas on the team's roster spots than usual.

| Player | Position(s) |
|---|---|
| Dave Bass | F/C |
| Bennie Borgmann | G/F |
| Gaza Chizmadia | F/C |
| Tiny Hearn | C |
| Lefty Kintzing | F/C |
| Happy Reilly | G/F |
| Honey Russell | G/F |
| Rusty Saunders | F/C |
| Moe Spahn | G/F |
| Lou Spindell | G/F |

Note: Red Conaty, Lute Share, Lou Wisner, and Fats Wyka are also listed to be a part of the team's roster, albeit erroneously so since they would only play for the Mules team that would play in Newark, New Jersey instead of in New Britain, Connecticut following the merger that occurred before the start of the second half of the season.

== American Basketball League Standings ==
First Half
| Team | Wins | Losses | Winning % |
|---|---|---|---|
| New York Jewels | 16 | 6 | .727 |
| Philadelphia SPHAs / Hebrews | 13 | 10 | .565 |
| Brooklyn Visitations | 13 | 11 | .542 |
| Newark Mules^{[a]} | 12 | 11 | .522 |
| Boston Trojans | 10 | 11 | .476 |
| Jersey Reds | 7 | 14 | .333 |
| New Britain Jackaways^{[a]} | 6 | 14 | .300 |

Second Half
| Team | Wins | Losses | Winning % |
|---|---|---|---|
| Brooklyn Visitations | 12 | 7 | .632 |
| Philadelphia SPHAs / Hebrews | 12 | 7 | .632 |
| New Britain Mules^{[a]} | 9 | 9 | .500 |
| Jersey Reds | 9 | 9 | .500 |
| New York Jewels | 8 | 10 | .444 |
| Boston Trojans | 4 | 12 | .250 |

== Notes ==
^{a} At the end of the first half of the season, the Newark Mules and New Britain Jackaways would merge operations to become the New Britain Mules on January 18, 1935. Because of the merger, the Newark franchise would fold operations by the start of the second half of the season, while the New Britain franchise would continue operations under a (mostly) new roster for the second half of the season.
