= 1934–35 Newark Mules season =

- League: American Basketball League (revived original)
- Head coach: Joe Dreyfus (12–10); Honey Russell (0–1)
- General manager: Joe Fay; Joe Dreyfus(?); Honey Russell(?)
- Owner(s): Joe Fay; Joe Dreyfus(?); Honey Russell(?)
- Arena: Portuguese Hall

Results
- Record: 12–11 (.522)
- Place: Conference: 4th (1st half)
- Playoff finish: Did not qualify. (Merged operations with the New Britain Jackaways by the end of the first half of the season to become the New Britain Mules for the second half of the season.)

The 1934–35 Newark Mules season was arguably seen as the second and final professional basketball season played by the Mules franchise in Newark, New Jersey, as well as their first and only season played under that particular name after previously competing as the Newark Bears. Originally, Newark was going to be one of seven teams competing for the ABL's championship this season before it later became a six team league by the start of the second half of the season. At first, the Mules would look like an above-average team in the league when they posted a 12–11 record for a middling fourth place finish in the first half of the season ahead of the Boston Trojans, Jersey Reds, and New Britain Jackaways, but behind the Brooklyn Visitations, the defending ABL champion Philadelphia SPHAs / Hebrews, and New York Jewels. However, when the New Britain Jackaways ended up deciding they wanted to fold operations before the start of the season half of the season, with the Mules facing their own struggles as a franchise behind the scenes, the ABL decided to allow a merger to occur between the two teams on January 18, 1935 where the Newark Mules would move to New Britain, Connecticut for the rest of the season to become the New Britain Mules instead, which essentially allowed them to take over both teams' positions in the ABL for that half of the season. As a result of the merger, the Newark Bears would essentially fold operations for the rest of the season despite them technically continuing operations in New Britain, Connecticut for the second half of the season. Regardless of whether one would count the New Britain Mules as a continuation of the Newark Mules' season or not, following an average 9–9 that had the New Britain Mules tie the Jersey Reds for third place, with both the Mules and Reds being behind a tied first place finish between Philadelphia and Brooklyn for the second half of the season, the Mules franchise would end up folding operations by the conclusion of the ABL's season all the same.

== Roster ==
Due to information on American Basketball League players being generally hard to find, there are bound to be more gaps and/or inaccuracies found in certain areas on the team's roster spots than usual.

Player	Position(s)
Bennie Borgmann	G/F
Gaza Chizmadia	F/C
Red Conaty	G/F
Tiny Hearn	C
Lefty Kintzing	F/C
Honey Russell	G/F
Lute Share	G/F
Lou Spindell	G/F
Lou Wisner	G/F
Fats Wyka	G/F

Note: Dave Bass, Happy Reilly, Rusty Saunders, and Moe Spahn are also listed to be a part of the team's roster, albeit erroneously since they would only play for the Mules team that would play in New Britain, Connecticut instead of in Newark, New Jersey following a later merger at hand.

== American Basketball League Standings ==
First Half
Team	Wins	Losses	Winning %
New York Jewels	16	6	.727
Philadelphia SPHAs / Hebrews	13	10	.565
Brooklyn Visitations	13	11	.542
Newark Mules^{[a]}	12	11	.522
Boston Trojans	10	11	.476
Jersey Reds	7	14	.333
New Britain Jackaways^{[a]}	6	14	.300

Second Half
Team	Wins	Losses	Winning %
Brooklyn Visitations	12	7	.632
Philadelphia SPHAs / Hebrews	12	7	.632
New Britain Mules^{[a]}	9	9	.500
Jersey Reds	9	9	.500
New York Jewels	8	10	.444
Boston Trojans	4	12	.250

== Notes ==
^{a} At the end of the first half of the season, the Newark Mules and New Britain Jackaways would merge operations to become the New Britain Mules on January 18, 1935. Because of the merger, the Newark franchise would fold operations by the start of the second half of the season, while the New Britain franchise would continue operations under a (mostly) new roster for the second half of the season.
