= 1934–35 New Britain Jackaways / Mules season =

- League: American Basketball League (revived original)
- Head coach: Henry Zaleski (6–14); Honey Russell (9–9)
- General manager: Henry Zaleski; Joe Fay(?); Honey Russell(?)
- Owner(s): Henry Zaleski(?); Joe Fay(?); Honey Russell(?)
- Arena: New Britain Municipal Auditorium

Results
- Record: 15–23 (.395)
- Place: Conference: 7th (1st half for the Jackaways); T–3rd (2nd half for the Mules)
- Playoff finish: Did not qualify

The 1934–35 New Britain Jackaways / Mules season was both the fourth and final professional basketball season played for this franchise and the second and final season of the team that was playing in New Britain, Connecticut after they previously played as the Hoboken Lisas in the briefly revived Metropolitan Basketball League, the Hoboken Thourots from Hoboken, New Jersey, the Camden Brewers in Camden, New Jersey, and the New Britain Palaces in New Britain, Connecticut. Originally, the team operated just under the recently rebranded New Britain Jackaways name under the first half of the season before the team merged operations with the recently renamed Newark Mules (previously known as the Newark Bears) from Newark, New Jersey to become the New Britain Mules for the second half of the season only. (However, it is recently believed that the team playing in the second half of the season is really just the Newark Mules while representing New Britain, Connecticut for the ABL this season in place of the New Britain Jackaways due to the original Jackaways team folding operations on January 18, 1935.) In any case, the New Britain Jackaways would end up struggling throughout the first half of the season, to the point where they finished the first half of the season with a 6–14 record for a last place finish for that half of the season before the Jackaways technically folded operations and were replaced by the Newark Mules under a sort of merger to become the New Britain Mules for the rest of the season (in the second half of the season) going forward. Once New Britain entered the second half of the season as the Mules instead of the Jackaways, the New Britain Mules would perform a fair bit better as a team during that half of the season, to the point where their overall placement would improve from last place (at 7th for New Britain (or 4th for the Newark Mules)) to tying for third place with the Jersey Reds, albeit with an average 9–9 record that still had them behind only the defending ABL champion Philadelphia SPHAs / Hebrews and the Brooklyn Visitations for a first place tie there. As such, New Britain would not only fail to qualify for the ABL's championship series once again, but both the Jackaways and the Mules teams that New Britain fielded this season would withdraw their operations from the league entirely following the season's conclusion as well.

== Rosters ==
Due to information on American Basketball League players being generally hard to find, there are bound to be more gaps and/or inaccuracies found in certain areas on the team's roster spots than usual.

=== New Britain Jackaways Roster ===
Player	Position(s)
Dave Bass	F/C
Dutch Dehnert	F/C
Stan Entrup	C
Moe Frankel	G/F
Art Kaufman	G/F
Willie Putzer	G/F
Jerry Radice	G
Al Sloman	G/F
Moe Spahn	G/F
Moon Stetkewicz	G/F
Lou Wisner	G
Henry Zaleski	G/F

=== New Britain Mules Roster ===
Player	Position(s)
Dave Bass	F/C
Bennie Borgmann	G/F
Gaza Chizmadia	F/C
Tiny Hearn	C
Lefty Kintzing	F/C
Happy Reilly	G/F
Honey Russell	G/F
Rusty Saunders	F/C
Moe Spahn	G/F
Lou Spindell	G/F

Note: Only Dave Bass and Moe Spahn from the New Britain Jackaways would be retained from the merger between the Jackaways and the Newark Mules as the two teams merged operations to become the New Britain Mules for the second half of the season.

== American Basketball League Standings ==
First Half
Team	Wins	Losses	Winning %
New York Jewels	16	6	.727
Philadelphia SPHAs / Hebrews	13	10	.565
Brooklyn Visitations	13	11	.542
Newark Mules^{[a]}	12	11	.522
Boston Trojans	10	11	.476
Jersey Reds	7	14	.333
New Britain Jackaways^{[a]}	6	14	.300

Second Half
Team	Wins	Losses	Winning %
Brooklyn Visitations	12	7	.632
Philadelphia SPHAs / Hebrews	12	7	.632
New Britain Mules^{[a]}	9	9	.500
Jersey Reds	9	9	.500
New York Jewels	8	10	.444
Boston Trojans	4	12	.250

== Notes ==
^{a} At the end of the first half of the season, the Newark Mules and New Britain Jackaways would merge operations to become the New Britain Mules on January 18, 1935. Because of the merger, the Newark franchise would fold operations by the start of the second half of the season, while the New Britain franchise would continue operations under a (mostly) new roster for the second half of the season.
