= 1934–35 New Britain Jackaways season =

- League: American Basketball League (revived original)
- Head coach: Henry Zaleski
- General manager: Henry Zaleski
- Owner(s): Henry Zaleski(?)
- Arena: New Britain Municipal Auditorium

Results
- Record: 6–14 (.300)
- Place: Conference: 7th (1st half)
- Playoff finish: Did not qualify. (Merged operations with the Newark Mules by the end of the first half of the season to become the New Britain Mules for the second half of the season.)

The 1934–35 New Britain Jackaways season was both the fourth and final professional basketball season played for this franchise and the second and final season of the team that was playing in New Britain, Connecticut after they previously played as the Hoboken Lisas in the briefly revived Metropolitan Basketball League, the Hoboken Thourots from Hoboken, New Jersey, the Camden Brewers in Camden, New Jersey, and the New Britain Palaces in New Britain, Connecticut. Originally, the Jackaways were going to be one of seven teams competing for the ABL's championship this season before it later became a six team league by the start of the second half of the season. Unfortunately for the Jackaways, they would end up struggling very badly in the first half of the season, as they would end up with a below-average 6–14 record that put them in last place behind that of even the newly added Boston Trojans expansion franchise (with them being a half-game behind the recently rebranded Jersey Reds for a sixth place finish instead). Following the conclusion to the first half of the season, the Jackaways would originally fold operations by the conclusion of the first half of the season before they ended up merging operations with the Newark Mules on January 18, 1935 to essentially have the Mules operate for them in New Britain for the second half of the season under the New Britain Mules name instead. In any case, this technically marked the official end for the New Britain Jackaways for the ABL this season, as their operations would essentially be replaced by the New Britain Mules for the rest of the season going forward. Despite the Mules performing a lot better than the Jackaways in the second half of the season, they not only failed to qualify for the ABL's championship series in the second half of the season (due to the tied record with the Jersey Reds still being behind both the defending champion Philadelphia SPHAs / Hebrews and the Brooklyn Visitations, who tied for first place in that half of the season themselves), but they would also end up failing to return to the ABL as well following this season's conclusion.

== Roster ==
Due to information on American Basketball League players being generally hard to find, there are bound to be more gaps and/or inaccuracies found in certain areas on the team's roster spots than usual.

Player	Position(s)
Dave Bass	F/C
Dutch Dehnert	F/C
Stan Entrup	C
Moe Frankel	G/F
Art Kaufman	G/F
Willie Putzer	G/F
Jerry Radice	G
Al Sloman	G/F
Moe Spahn	G/F
Moon Stetkewicz	G/F
Lou Wisner	G
Henry Zaleski	G/F

== American Basketball League Standings ==
First Half
Team	Wins	Losses	Winning %
New York Jewels	16	6	.727
Philadelphia SPHAs / Hebrews	13	10	.565
Brooklyn Visitations	13	11	.542
Newark Mules^{[a]}	12	11	.522
Boston Trojans	10	11	.476
Jersey Reds	7	14	.333
New Britain Jackaways^{[a]}	6	14	.300

Second Half
Team	Wins	Losses	Winning %
Brooklyn Visitations	12	7	.632
Philadelphia SPHAs / Hebrews	12	7	.632
New Britain Mules^{[a]}	9	9	.500
Jersey Reds	9	9	.500
New York Jewels	8	10	.444
Boston Trojans	4	12	.250

== Notes ==
^{a} At the end of the first half of the season, the Newark Mules and New Britain Jackaways would merge operations to become the New Britain Mules on January 18, 1935. Because of the merger, the Newark franchise would fold operations by the start of the second half of the season, while the New Britain franchise would continue operations under a (mostly) new roster for the second half of the season.
