= 1934–35 Newark / New Britain Mules season =

- League: American Basketball League (revived original)
- Head coach: Joe Dreyfus (12–10); Honey Russell (9–10)
- General manager: Joe Fay; Joe Dreyfus(?); Honey Russell(?)
- Owner(s): Joe Fay; Joe Dreyfus(?); Honey Russell(?)
- Arena: Portuguese Hall (Newark); New Britain Municipal Auditorium (New Britain)

Results
- Record: 21–20 (.512)
- Place: Conference: 4th (1st half (as Newark Mules)); T–3rd (2nd half (as New Britain Mules)
- Playoff finish: Did not qualify

The 1934–35 Newark / New Britain Mules season was arguably seen as the second and final professional basketball season played by the Mules franchise in Newark, New Jersey, as well as their first and only season played under that particular name after previously competing as the Newark Bears. Originally, the team operated just under the recently rebranded Newark Mules name under the first half of the season before the team merged operations with the recently renamed New Britain Jackaways (previously known as the New Britain Palaces) from New Britain, Connecticut to become the New Britain Mules for the second half of the season only. (However, it is recently believed that the team playing in the second half of the season is really just the Newark Mules while representing New Britain, Connecticut for the ABL this season in place of the New Britain Jackaways due to the original Jackaways team folding operations on January 18, 1935.) In any case, the Mules would look like an above-average team in the league when they posted a 12–11 record for a middling fourth place finish in the first half of the season ahead of the Boston Trojans, Jersey Reds, and New Britain Jackaways, but behind the Brooklyn Visitations, the defending ABL champion Philadelphia SPHAs / Hebrews, and New York Jewels before the Newark Mules technically folded operations due to them merging operations with the struggling Jackaways to become the New Britain Mules for the second half of the season. While most media outlets would list the second half of the season for the Mules as one that's more as a continuation for the New Britain franchise than that of the Mules franchise that started in Newark (or at least separate the two teams in the first half of the season from the New Britain Mules franchise for the second half of the season), the New Britain Mules would end up getting an average 9–9 that tied the Jersey Reds for third place, with both the Mules and Reds being behind a tied first place finish between Philadelphia and Brooklyn for the second half of the season. Regardless of whether one would count the second half of the Mules franchise's season as a continuation of the Newark Mules team or the New Britain Jackaways team, the New Britain Mules would end up folding operations by the conclusion of this season due to their own financial struggles despite performing decently well for this season.

== Rosters ==
Due to information on American Basketball League players being generally hard to find, there are bound to be more gaps and/or inaccuracies found in certain areas on the team's roster spots than usual.

=== Newark Mules Roster ===
Player	Position(s)
Bennie Borgmann	G/F
Gaza Chizmadia	F/C
Red Conaty	G/F
Tiny Hearn	C
Lefty Kintzing	F/C
Honey Russell	G/F
Lute Share	G/F
Lou Spindell	G/F
Lou Wisner	G/F
Fats Wyka	G/F

=== New Britain Mules Roster ===
Player	Position(s)
Dave Bass	F/C
Bennie Borgmann	G/F
Gaza Chizmadia	F/C
Tiny Hearn	C
Lefty Kintzing	F/C
Happy Reilly	G/F
Honey Russell	G/F
Rusty Saunders	F/C
Moe Spahn	G/F
Lou Spindell	G/F

Note: Only Red Conaty, Lute Share, Lou Wisner, and Fats Wyka would not appear with the team following their merger with the New Britain Jackaways to become the New Britain Mules for the second half of the season. Similarly speaking, only Dave Bass, Happy Reilly, Moe Spahn, and Lou Spindell would end up playing for the Mules while they were in New Britain only instead of while they were in Newark.

== American Basketball League Standings ==
First Half
Team	Wins	Losses	Winning %
New York Jewels	16	6	.727
Philadelphia SPHAs / Hebrews	13	10	.565
Brooklyn Visitations	13	11	.542
Newark Mules^{[a]}	12	11	.522
Boston Trojans	10	11	.476
Jersey Reds	7	14	.333
New Britain Jackaways^{[a]}	6	14	.300

Second Half
Team	Wins	Losses	Winning %
Brooklyn Visitations	12	7	.632
Philadelphia SPHAs / Hebrews	12	7	.632
New Britain Mules^{[a]}	9	9	.500
Jersey Reds	9	9	.500
New York Jewels	8	10	.444
Boston Trojans	4	12	.250

== Notes ==
^{a} At the end of the first half of the season, the Newark Mules and New Britain Jackaways would merge operations to become the New Britain Mules on January 18, 1935. Because of the merger, the Newark franchise would fold operations by the start of the second half of the season, while the New Britain franchise would continue operations under a (mostly) new roster for the second half of the season.
