= 1933–34 Newark Bears season =

American basketball team season

- League: American Basketball League (revived original)
- Head coach: Abe Schartoff
- General manager: Joe Fay(?); Abe Schartoff(?)
- Owner(s): Joe Fay; Abe Schartoff(?)
- Arena: Portuguese Hall

Results
- Record: 13–22 (.371)
- Place: Conference: 7th (1st half); 5th (2nd half)
- Playoff finish: Did not qualify

The 1933–34 Newark Bears season was arguably seen as the first professional basketball season played by the Newark Bears (who sometimes were referred to as the Newark Joe Fays) franchise in Newark, New Jersey, as well as their first and only full (professional) season played under that particular name. When the American Basketball League was revived in 1933 by Naismith Basketball Hall of Famer John J. O'Brien after he previously was managing the revived version of the Metropolitan Basketball League, O'Brien had the Newark Bears become the only independent team get invited into the revived version of the ABL after he previously invited the revived Eastern Basketball League's two best teams from the previous season in the EBL champion Trenton Moose and runner-up Philadelphia Sphas (the latter of whom previously competed in the original ABL as the Philadelphia Quakers / Warriors) to join up with five teams that were playing in the revived version of the Metropolitan Basketball League in the MBL champion Brooklyn Jewels, the Brooklyn Visitations (who previously participated in the original version of the ABL), the Bronx Americans (who previously played under multiple names the previous season), the Hoboken Thourots (formerly the Hoboken Lisas, though they later became the Camden Brewers and then the New Britain Palaces), and the Union City Reds to create the new eight team ABL that would essentially be the same version of the original ABL from the late 1920s and early 1930s, but with a few differences in terms of rules and scope in mind for this iteration of the ABL. During their first season as a professional team in the ABL, the Bears would end up performing rather poorly throughout the season, with the first half of the season resulting in them getting a below-average 9–17 record for a 7th place finish ahead of only the aforementioned Hoboken Thourots turned Camden Brewers turned New Britain Palaces. While the second half of the season would see them perform a little bit better, they'd still end up having a below-average record (albeit with a 4–5 finish this time around instead) that resulted in them being ahead of only the Union City Reds, the Bronx Americans, and the Brooklyn Visitations for a fifth place finish. As a result of their poor overall record, Newark would fail to qualify for the ABL's championship series for this season.

== Roster ==
Due to information on American Basketball League players being generally hard to find, there are bound to be more gaps and/or inaccuracies found in certain areas on the team's roster spots than usual.

| Player | Position(s) |
|---|---|
| Dave Bass | G/F |
| Bennie Borgmann | G/F |
| Lefty Budnetz | G/F |
| Gaza Chizmadia | F/C |
| Red Conaty | G/F |
| Stan Entrup | C |
| Jimmy Gordon | G |
| Harry Hamilton | C |
| Lefty Kintzing | G/F |
| Jimmy Lennon | C |
| Mooney Levine | G |
| Skeets Lonoff | G |
| Ernie McCoy | G/F |
| Don Nagle | F/C |
| Mickey Reichardt | G/F |
| Happy Reilly | G/F |
| Moe Spahn | F |
| Moe Weisman | F |

== American Basketball League Standings ==
First Half
| Team | Wins | Losses | Winning % |
|---|---|---|---|
| Trenton Moose | 22 | 6 | .786 |
| Brooklyn Jewels | 22 | 6 | .786 |
| Philadelphia SPHAs / Hebrews | 15 | 12 | .556 |
| Brooklyn Visitations | 12 | 12 | .500 |
| Bronx Americans | 10 | 15 | .400 |
| Union City Reds | 10 | 18 | .357 |
| Newark Bears | 9 | 17 | .346 |
| Hoboken Thourots/Camden Brewers/New Britain Palaces^{[a]} | 5 | 19 | .208 |

Second Half
| Team | Wins | Losses | Winning % |
|---|---|---|---|
| Philadelphia SPHAs / Hebrews | 14 | 0 | 1.000 |
| New Britain Palaces^{[a]} | 7 | 5 | .583 |
| Brooklyn Jewels | 4 | 4 | .500 |
| Trenton Moose | 6 | 7 | .462 |
| Newark Bears | 4 | 5 | .444 |
| Union City Reds | 4 | 7 | .364 |
| Bronx Americans | 2 | 6 | .250 |
| Brooklyn Visitations | 1 | 8 | .111 |

== Awards and honors ==
By the end of this season, Moe Spahn would end up being the leading scorer for the entire league in its first season back (and its seventh overall season of existence) with a total of 333 points scored for an average of 8.7 points per game.

== Notes ==
^{a} Became the Camden Brewers after losing their first 4 games of the season by November 23, 1933, then became the New Britain Palaces by January 10, 1934 after Camden won only two out of their next eight games, with New Britain entering the first half of the season with a 2–12 record afterward.
