= 1934–35 Boston Trojans season =

- League: American Basketball League (revived original)
- Head coach: Fiddle Morley (player-coach)
- General manager: Fiddle Morley(?)
- Owner(s): Fiddle Morley(?)
- Arena: Boston Arena

Results
- Record: 14–23 (.378)
- Place: Conference: 5th (1st half); 6th (2nd half)
- Playoff finish: Did not qualify

The 1934–35 Boston Trojans season was the first and only professional basketball season played by the Boston Trojans franchise in the capital city of Boston, Massachusetts. This season would technically mark the return of the ABL in the city of Boston (so long as one counts the revived iteration of it as a continuation of the original ABL from 1925 until 1931) after they previously had the Boston Whirlwinds debut for only the first half of the inaugural ABL season through the 1925–26 season before the Whirlwinds became the first team to officially leave the league (at least in terms of its original iteration) on February 11, 1926. Entering this season, the Trojans would be one of seven teams competing in the league this time around due to them being the only new team entering the revived ABL while both the Bronx Americans and the Trenton Moose left the league, though it later turned into six teams by the second half of the season due to the recently rebranded Newark Mules and New Britain Jackaways merging operations to become the New Britain Mules to complete the season. In any case, for the first half of the season, the Trojans looked like they would be closer to an average team in the ABL, though they would finish that season with a (barely) below-average 10–11 record for a fifth place finish where Boston would be ahead of only the recently rebranded Jersey Reds and the aforementioned New Britain Jackaways. However, the second half of the season would see the Trojans get an even worse 4–12 record to finish that particular half of the season in last place through a sixth place finish, being four games behind the recently rebranded New York Jewels for fifth place in that half. Due to their poor results in the ABL, the Boston Trojans would not only fail to qualify for the ABL's championship series, but also drop out of the league for the following season soon afterward, with the Trojans never becoming a professional team again soon afterward.

== Roster ==
Due to information on American Basketball League players being generally hard to find, there are bound to be more gaps and/or inaccuracies found in certain areas on the team's roster spots than usual.

| Player | Position(s) |
|---|---|
| Davey Banks | G/F |
| Lou Bender | F |
| Gaza Chizmadia | F/C |
| Art Feldman | F |
| George Glasco | G/F |
| Austin Hamburger | G/F |
| Pat Herlihy | C |
| Nat Hickey | G/F |
| Carl Husta | G |
| Al Kellett | C |
| Henry Kiley | G/F |
| Lefty Kintzing | F |
| Elky Maister | G |
| Fiddle Morley | G |
| Jerry Radice | F |
| Happy Reilly | F |
| Rusty Saunders | F/C |
| Sam Shapiro | F |
| Frank Shimek | G |
| Moe Spahn | F |
| Jack Sweeney | G |

== American Basketball League Standings ==
First Half
| Team | Wins | Losses | Winning % |
|---|---|---|---|
| New York Jewels | 16 | 6 | .727 |
| Philadelphia SPHAs / Hebrews | 13 | 10 | .565 |
| Brooklyn Visitations | 13 | 11 | .542 |
| Newark Mules^{[a]} | 12 | 11 | .522 |
| Boston Trojans | 10 | 11 | .476 |
| Jersey Reds | 7 | 14 | .333 |
| New Britain Jackaways^{[a]} | 6 | 14 | .300 |

Second Half
| Team | Wins | Losses | Winning % |
|---|---|---|---|
| Brooklyn Visitations | 12 | 7 | .632 |
| Philadelphia SPHAs / Hebrews | 12 | 7 | .632 |
| New Britain Mules^{[a]} | 9 | 9 | .500 |
| Jersey Reds | 9 | 9 | .500 |
| New York Jewels | 8 | 10 | .444 |
| Boston Trojans | 4 | 12 | .250 |

== Notes ==
^{a} At the end of the first half of the season, the Newark Mules and New Britain Jackaways would merge operations to become the New Britain Mules on January 18, 1935. Because of the merger, the Newark franchise would fold operations by the start of the second half of the season, while the New Britain franchise would continue operations under a (mostly) new roster for the second half of the season.
