= 1934–35 Jersey Reds season =

- League: American Basketball League (revived original)
- Head coach: Muggsy Miller
- General manager: Muggsy Miller(?)
- Owner(s): Muggsy Miller(?)
- Arena: Columbia Park

Results
- Record: 16–23 (.410)
- Place: Conference: 6th (1st half); T–3rd (2nd half)
- Playoff finish: Did not qualify

The 1934–35 Jersey Reds season was officially the fourth professional basketball season played by the Jersey Reds franchise and their first season played in the city of North Bergen, New Jersey under their proper Jersey Reds name after they previously played their first three seasons as the Union City Reds (two of which were played in the revived version of the Metropolitan Basketball League) in nearby Union City, New Jersey. The ABL entered this season with seven teams competing in their league (with a few teams like the Reds moving their operations elsewhere or otherwise rebranding themselves entirely and both the Bronx Americans and Trenton Moose withdrawing their operations from the ABL this season while the Boston Trojans were added in the ABL this season) to start out the season, though it would later end up with only six teams by the second half of the season due to the New Britain Jackaways and the Newark Mules merging operations on January 18, 1935, to become the New Britain Mules to conclude the season. In any case, the Reds would start out their first season in the city of North Bergen with a below-average 7–14 record for a sixth place finish ahead of only the aforementioned New Britain Jackaways that would technically go defunct by the end of that half of the season, thus continuing the franchise's recent woes when entering the ABL. However, when they entered the second half of the season, the Jersey Reds would perform a fair bit better with an average 9–9 record to tie for third place with the newly-merged New Britain Mules, with their tied placement still having them be behind the two best teams that tied for first place in the second half of the season in the Brooklyn Visitations and the defending champion Philadelphia SPHAs / Hebrews, with the Visitations later being the winners for that particular half of the season. With that in mind, the Jersey Reds would fail to qualify for the ABL's championship series due to them failing to get first place in either half of the split season format of play.

== Roster ==
Due to information on American Basketball League players being generally hard to find, there are bound to be more gaps and/or inaccuracies found in certain areas on the team's roster spots than usual.

1934–35 Jersey Reds roster
Players

Pos.	No.	Player	Height	Weight	DOB	From
G		Paulie Adamo	5 ft 11 in (1.80 m)	165 lb (75 kg)	1907-01-11	Panzer College
G/F		Hook Anderson	5 ft 11 in (1.80 m)	185 lb (84 kg)	1912-04-08	NYU
F		Lou Bender	6 ft 1 in (1.85 m)	175 lb (79 kg)	1910-03-08	Columbia
C		Al Benson	6 ft 5 in (1.96 m)	220 lb (100 kg)	1914-07-27	Seton Hall
G		Rip Collins	6 ft 1 in (1.85 m)	185 lb (84 kg)	1907	St. John's
C		Stan Entrup	6 ft 4 in (1.93 m)	205 lb (93 kg)	1907-03-16	No college
G/F		Moe Frankel	5 ft 10 in (1.78 m)	190 lb (86 kg)	1913-01-25	No college
G/F		Freddie Gerken	5 ft 9 in (1.75 m)	150 lb (68 kg)	1911-11-01	No college
G/F		Buddy Hassett	5 ft 11 in (1.80 m)	175 lb (79 kg)	1911-09-05	Manhattan
C		Jimmy Lennon	6 ft 2 in (1.88 m)	165 lb (75 kg)	1906-12-07	No college
G/F		Happy Reilly	5 ft 8 in (1.73 m)	165 lb (75 kg)	1907	No college
C		Jack Reismuller	6 ft 6 in (1.98 m)	220 lb (100 kg)	1909	No college
G		Willie Scrill	5 ft 10 in (1.78 m)	175 lb (79 kg)	1907-09-01	No college
F/C		Bob Synnott	6 ft 3 in (1.91 m)	190 lb (86 kg)	1912-09-27	Theodore Roosevelt HS (NY)
G		Lou Wisner	5 ft 6 in (1.68 m)	140 lb (64 kg)	1910-09-16	CCNY

Coaches
Head coach

Muggsy Miller

Legend
- (DP) Unsigned draft pick
- (FA) Free agent
- (S) Suspended
- Injured

== American Basketball League Standings ==
First Half
Team	Wins	Losses	Winning %
New York Jewels	16	6	.727
Philadelphia SPHAs / Hebrews	13	10	.565
Brooklyn Visitations	13	11	.542
Newark Mules^{[a]}	12	11	.522
Boston Trojans	10	11	.476
Jersey Reds	7	14	.333
New Britain Jackaways^{[a]}	6	14	.300

Second Half
Team	Wins	Losses	Winning %
Brooklyn Visitations	12	7	.632
Philadelphia SPHAs / Hebrews	12	7	.632
Jersey Reds	9	9	.500
New Britain Mules^{[a]}	9	9	.500
New York Jewels	8	10	.444
Boston Trojans	4	12	.250

== Notes ==
^{a} At the end of the first half of the season, the Newark Mules and New Britain Jackaways would merge operations to become the New Britain Mules on January 18, 1935. Because of the merger, the Newark franchise would fold operations by the start of the second half of the season, while the New Britain franchise would continue operations under a (mostly) new roster for the second half of the season.
