= 1935–36 Jersey Reds season =

- League: American Basketball League (revived original)
- Head coach: Muggsy Miller
- General manager: Muggsy Miller(?)
- Owner(s): Muggsy Miller(?)
- Arena: Columbia Park

Results
- Record: 20–18 (.526)
- Place: Conference: 4th (1st half); 2nd (2nd half)
- Playoff finish: Did not qualify

The 1935–36 Jersey Reds season was officially the fifth professional basketball season played by the Jersey Reds franchise and their second season played in the city of North Bergen, New Jersey under their proper Jersey Reds name after they previously played their first three seasons as the Union City Reds (two of which were played in the revived version of the Metropolitan Basketball League) in nearby Union City, New Jersey. Entering this season, the ABL would see only six teams competing in their league this time around due to both the Boston Trojans and New Britain Mules folding operations by the end of the season, with the Kingston Colonials (who had previously existed since 1909 under multiple leagues and names) and the Paterson Panthers (who later became the Trenton Bengals and then the Passaic Red Devils) replacing them in the process. In the first half of the season, the Jersey Reds would get another half-season with an average record of 9–9 to end that season technically tied with the defending ABL champion Brooklyn Visitations in terms of win percentage only, but actually were stuck in fourth place behind the newly added Kingston Colonials and the Paterson Panthers turned Trenton Bengals (later turned Passaic Red Devils) to conclude that half of the season. However, the second half of the season would have them perform a lot better with a (barely) above-average 11–9 record to (barely) get a second place finish behind only the defending ABL champion Brooklyn Visitations (although the Reds and Visitations were a few games closer to a last place finish in that half than they wanted to see on their ends). In any case, the Jersey Reds would once again fail to qualify for the championship series due to them failing to win either half of this split season (specifically the second half of the season in this case).

== Roster ==
Due to information on American Basketball League players being generally hard to find, there are bound to be more gaps and/or inaccuracies found in certain areas on the team's roster spots than usual.

1935–36 Jersey Reds roster
Players

Pos.	No.	Player	Height	Weight	DOB	From
G		Paulie Adamo	5 ft 11 in (1.80 m)	165 lb (75 kg)	1907-01-11	Panzer College
G/F		Hook Anderson	5 ft 11 in (1.80 m)	185 lb (84 kg)	1912-04-08	NYU
C		Al Benson	6 ft 5 in (1.96 m)	220 lb (100 kg)	1914-07-27	Seton Hall
G/F		Johnny Cendo	6 ft 0 in (1.83 m)	190 lb (86 kg)	1909-07-08	Panzer College
G/F		Moe Dubilier	6 ft 2 in (1.88 m)	210 lb (95 kg)	1915-02-20	John Marshall University
C		Stan Entrup	6 ft 4 in (1.93 m)	205 lb (93 kg)	1907-03-16	No college
G/F		Moe Frankel	5 ft 10 in (1.78 m)	190 lb (86 kg)	1913-01-25	No college
G/F		Freddie Gerken	5 ft 9 in (1.75 m)	150 lb (68 kg)	1911-11-01	No college
G/F		George Glasco	5 ft 10 in (1.78 m)	150 lb (68 kg)	1901-04-07	No college
F/C		Mike Michelotti	6 ft 2 in (1.88 m)	180 lb (82 kg)	1909	Bryant HS (NY)
G/F		Chick Reiser	5 ft 11 in (1.80 m)	165 lb (75 kg)	1914-12-17	Pratt Institute
G		Willie Scrill	5 ft 10 in (1.78 m)	175 lb (79 kg)	1907-09-01	No college
F		Moe Spahn	6 ft 1 in (1.85 m)	180 lb (82 kg)	1912-05-03	CCNY
F/C		Bob Synnott	6 ft 3 in (1.91 m)	190 lb (86 kg)	1912-09-27	Theodore Roosevelt HS (NY)

Coaches
Head coach

Muggsy Miller

Legend
- (DP) Unsigned draft pick
- (FA) Free agent
- (S) Suspended
- Injured

== American Basketball League Standings ==
First Half
Team	Wins	Losses	Winning %
Philadelphia SPHAs / Hebrews	14	5	.737
New York Jewels	11	8	.579
Brooklyn Visitations	10	10	.500
Jersey Reds	9	9	.500
Kingston Colonials	7	12	.368
Paterson Panthers / Trenton Bengals^{[a]}	4	11	.267

Second Half
Team	Wins	Losses	Winning %
Brooklyn Visitations	12	8	.600
Jersey Reds	11	9	.550
New York Jewels	10	10	.500
Kingston Colonials	9	10	.474
Philadelphia SPHAs / Hebrews	9	11	.450
Passaic Red Devils^{[a]}	8	11	.421

== Notes ==
^{a} During the first half of the season, after losing all five of the games they played this season, the Paterson Panthers would move from Paterson, New Jersey to nearby Trenton, New Jersey on December 12, 1935, to become the newer version of the Trenton Bengals for the rest of the season. Trenton would finish the first half of the season with a 4–6 record for an overall record of 4–11 between the two teams before the Trenton squad moved out to nearby Passaic, New Jersey on December 30, 1935, to play as the Passaic Red Devils by the time the second half of the season began.
