= 1934–35 Philadelphia Sphas season =

American basketball team season

1934–35 Philadelphia Sphas / Hebrews season
- League: American Basketball League (revived original)
- Head coach: Eddie Gottlieb
- General manager: Eddie Gottlieb
- Owner(s): Eddie Gottlieb
- Arena: Broadwood Hotel

Results
- Record: 25–17 (.595)
- Place: Conference: 2nd (1st half), T-1st (2nd half)
- Playoff finish: Did not qualify (Lost ABL second half tiebreaker series to Brooklyn Visitations, 2–1)

The Philadelphia Sphas were an early, historical example of an American professional basketball team. The 1934–35 season was the second season played in the now-revived American Basketball League by the Sphas, although they did play in the original rendition of the ABL from 1926 to 1928 as the Philadelphia Warriors, which had no relation to the later BAA franchise of the same name that now exists in the present day as the Golden State Warriors in the NBA. As such, when including the past history of the original ABL with the revived version of the ABL in 1933 following historical problems that related to the Great Depression near the end of 1931, this would technically be the eighth official season played by the original ABL properly, though this would officially be the 18th season of play for the Sphas franchise when including previous seasons where they played under names like the "Philadelphia YMHA"; the "Philadelphia Passon, Gottlieb, Black", the "Philadelphia Warriors"; and most recently, the "Philadelphia Hebrews".

== Background ==
The Sphas played in leagues around Philadelphia since 1917, but game-by-game records before the Sphas rejoined the ABL in 1933 are not (currently) available (at least, not to the general public if official game records did exist for the Sphas) and are therefore likely lost to time itself.

When trying to repeat their championship run from the ABL's return season into the second season of its return, the Sphas would finish the first half of the season with a second place finish of 13–10, an above-average record that was behind the New York Jewels with their even better 16–6 record. With a shot at a repeat for the ABL championship on the line, the Sphas would end up tying their second half of the season record with the Brooklyn Visitations, being led in part by future NBL all-time legend and Naismith Basketball Hall of Famer Bobby McDermott after previously being one of the worst teams the previous season, through a 12–7 record that concluded with Brooklyn defeating Philadelphia in the second half's season finale by a 39–31 defeat on the Sphas' end on March 24, 1935. Because the ABL did not allow for a regular playoff format at this time and instead revolved around the two best teams of each half competing for the league's championship, the Sphas and the Visitiations competed for the right to compete against the New York Jewels with a best-of-three tiebreaker series. Unfortunately for the Sphas, after winning their first game with a rather convincing 24–15 final score on April 5, they would lose their next game a day later in a just-as-convincing 39–30 beatdown before ultimately losing their final game in a close 25–26 defeat to be eliminated from championship contention with a 2–1 series defeat, with the Visitations ultimately defeating the Jewels to win the revived ABL's second championship series ever held. During this season, the Sphas were also referred to as the Philadelphia Hebrews in league records during this period of time, with the Hebrews name continuing to be utilized until 1937.

== Roster ==
1934–35 Philadelphia Sphas / Hebrews roster
Players

Pos.	No.	Player	Height	Weight	DOB	From
G/F		Gil Fitch	6 ft 0 in (1.83 m)	175 lb (79 kg)	1909–12–24	Temple
F/C		Moe Goldman	6 ft 3 in (1.91 m)	175 lb (79 kg)	1913–05–30	CCNY
G/F		Shikey Gotthoffer	6 ft 0 in (1.83 m)	195 lb (88 kg)	1911–01–01	NYU
G		Cy Kaselman	5 ft 10 in (1.78 m)	165 lb (75 kg)	1909–05–01	Temple
F/C		Inky Lautman	6 ft 2 in (1.88 m)	205 lb (93 kg)	1914–05–22	Central HS (PA)
G		Harry Litwack	5 ft 7 in (1.70 m)	170 lb (77 kg)	1907–09–20	Temple
F/C		Red Rosan	6 ft 2 in (1.88 m)	195 lb (88 kg)	1911–05–22	Temple
G		Red Wolfe	5 ft 11 in (1.80 m)	165 lb (75 kg)	1905–07–18	St. John's

Coaches
Head coach
- Eddie Gottlieb

Legend
- (DP) Unsigned draft pick
- (FA) Free agent
- (S) Suspended
- Injured

== ABL Standings ==
First Half
Team	Wins	Losses	Winning %
New York Jewels	16	6	.727
Philadelphia SPHAs / Hebrews	13	10	.565
Brooklyn Visitations	13	11	.542
Newark Mules^{[a]}	12	11	.522
Boston Trojans	10	11	.476
Jersey Reds	7	14	.333
New Britain Jackaways^{[a]}	6	14	.300

Second Half
Team	Wins	Losses	Winning %
Brooklyn Visitations	12	7	.632
Philadelphia SPHAs / Hebrews	12	7	.632
New Britain Mules^{[a]}	9	9	.500
Jersey Reds	9	9	.500
New York Jewels	8	10	.444
Boston Trojans	4	12	.250

== ABL Schedule ==
First Half
#	Date	Opponent	Score	Record
1A	November 3	Newark Mules^{[a]}	25–20	1–0
2A	November 10	Brooklyn Visitations	27–33	1–1
3A	November 11	@ New York Jewels	27–31	1–2
4A	November 15	@ New Britain Jackaways^{[a]}	32–29	2–2
5A	November 17	New Britain Jackaways^{[a]}	31–27	3–2
6A	November 24	Jersey Reds	32–24	4–2
7A	November 26	@ Boston Trojans	33–35	4–3
8A	December 1	Boston Trojans	44–30	5–3
9A	December 7	@ Newark Mules^{[a]}	27–22	6–3
10A	December 8	New York Jewels	31–35	6–4
11A	December 9	@ Brooklyn Visitations	23–27	6–5
12A	December 15	Newark Mules^{[a]}	31–22	7–5
13A	December 16 (Game 1)	@ Jersey Reds	33–44	7–6
14A	December 16 (Game 2)	@ New York Jewels	22–21	8–6
15A	December 22	New Britain Jackaways^{[a]}	26–21	9–6
16A	December 26	@ New Britain Jackaways^{[a]}	28–14	10–6
17A	December 27	@ Boston Trojans	20–32	10–7
18A	December 29	Brooklyn Visitations	34–30	11–7
19A	January 5	Boston Trojans	20–34	11–8
20A	January 6	@ Brooklyn Visitations	37–27	12–8
21A	January 12	New York Jewels	14–25	12–9
22A	January 19	Jersey Reds	43–23	13–9
23A	January 20	@ Jersey Reds	28–35	13–10

Second Half
#	Date	Opponent	Score	Record
1B	January 26	Brooklyn Visitations	39–25	1–0
2B	January 27	@ Brooklyn Visitations	28–31	1–1
3B	February 2	Boston Trojans	44–18	2–1
4B	February 3	@ Jersey Reds	27–24	3–1
5B	February 9	New Britain Mules^{[a]}	22–27	3–2
6B	February 10	@ New Britain Mules^{[a]}	26–35	3–3
7B	February 16	New York Jewels	40–37	4–3
8B	February 22	New Britain Mules^{[a]}	22–18	5–3
9B	February 23	Jersey Reds	36–21	6–3
10B	March 2	Brooklyn Visitations	21–19	7–3
11B	March 3	@ New York Jewels	18–34	7–4
12B	March 9	Boston Trojans	34–29	8–4
13B	March 10	@ Jersey Reds	37–32	9–4
14B	March 16	New York Jewels	37–33	10–4
15B	March 17	@ New York Jewels	24–36	10–5
16B	March 19	New Britain Mules^{[a]}	19–25	10–6
17B	March 20	Boston Trojans	36–31	11–6
18B	March 23	Jersey Reds	44–30	12–6
19B	March 24	@ Brooklyn Visitations	31–39	12–7

Second Half First Place Tiebreaker Series
Game	Date	Opponent	Score	Record
Game 1	April 5	@ Brooklyn Visitations	24–15	1–0
Game 2	April 6	Brooklyn Visitations	30–39	1–1
Game 3	April 11	Brooklyn Visitations	25–26	1–2

== Notes ==
^{a} At the end of the first half of the season, the Newark Mules and New Britain Jackaways would merge operations to become the New Britain Mules on January 18, 1935. Because of the merger, the Newark franchise would fold operations by the start of the second half of the season, while the New Britain franchise would continue operations under a (mostly) new roster for the second half of the season.
