= 1938–39 Jersey Reds season =

- League: American Basketball League (revived original)
- Head coach: Muggsy Miller
- General manager: Muggsy Miller(?)
- Owner(s): Muggsy Miller(?)
- Arena: Columbia Park

Results
- Record: 19–14 (.576)
- Place: Conference: 3rd
- Playoff finish: Lost ABL championship series 3–0 to the New York Jewels.

The 1938–39 Jersey Reds season was officially the eighth professional basketball season played by the Jersey Reds franchise and their fifth season played in the city of North Bergen, New Jersey under their proper Jersey Reds name after they previously played their first three seasons as the Union City Reds (two of which were played in the revived version of the Metropolitan Basketball League) in nearby Union City, New Jersey. For the first time in the franchise's history, they sought to repeat as champions in the ABL, though this season would see their league operate under a proper regular season format similar to what the rivaling National Basketball League was doing. This season would also see eight teams competing in the league this season with two new teams in the Washington Heurichs works team and the Wilkes-Barre Barons (the latter of which had history dating as far back as 1914) being added to the league while the New York Celtics were technically replaced by the Troy Haymakers in the process. Unfortunately for the defending champions, the Reds would not perform as well as a team when compared to how they did in their previous two seasons in the ABL, as they'd finish the season with an above-average record of 19–14 for a third place finish behind the Philadelphia Sphas and the Kingston Colonials, though Jersey would qualify for the newly-formatted ABL Playoffs due to its formatting having the four best teams in the league qualify for the event similar to what the rivaling NBL would later do from 1941 to 1944. However, the Reds would end up facing off against the Colonials in the semifinal round of the playoffs, with Jersey later upsetting them 2–1 to earn a shot at repeating as league champions in the ABL this season. Despite their upset semifinals victory against Kingston, however, the Jersey Reds would end up failing to repeat as champions against the #4 seeded team of the playoffs, the New York Jewels, due to the Jewels surprisingly sweeping the defending champions 3–0 in the ABL's championship series to conclude the season.

== Roster ==
Due to information on American Basketball League players being generally hard to find, there are bound to be more gaps and/or inaccuracies found in certain areas on the team's roster spots than usual.

1938–39 Jersey Reds roster
Players

Pos.	No.	Player	Height	Weight	DOB	From
G		Paulie Adamo	5 ft 11 in (1.80 m)	165 lb (75 kg)	1907-01-11	Panzer College
G/F		Hook Anderson	5 ft 11 in (1.80 m)	185 lb (84 kg)	1912-04-08	NYU
C		Al Benson	6 ft 5 in (1.96 m)	220 lb (100 kg)	1914-07-27	Seton Hall
F		Ben Carnevale	6 ft 4 in (1.93 m)	195 lb (88 kg)	1915-10-30	NYU
G/F		Ace Goldstein	6 ft 1 in (1.85 m)	190 lb (86 kg)	1917-03-20	CCNY
C		Chuck Huntington	6 ft 3 in (1.91 m)	190 lb (86 kg)	1902-09-03	No college
G/F		Tommy O'Brien	5 ft 8 in (1.73 m)	165 lb (75 kg)	1916-02-16	George Washington
F		Red Paris	5 ft 8 in (1.73 m)	150 lb (68 kg)	1918-01-08	CCNY
G/F		Phil Rabin	5 ft 9 in (1.75 m)	150 lb (68 kg)	1913-07-10	Long Island
F		Lou Rosenfeld	6 ft 1 in (1.85 m)	190 lb (86 kg)	1916-07-03	Long Island
G		Eddie Schurmann	6 ft 2 in (1.88 m)	175 lb (79 kg)	1918-07-27	NYU
F		Moe Spahn	6 ft 1 in (1.85 m)	180 lb (82 kg)	1912-05-03	CCNY
F		Irv Torgoff	6 ft 2 in (1.88 m)	192 lb (87 kg)	1917-03-06	Long Island
F		Fats Wyka	6 ft 1 in (1.85 m)	190 lb (86 kg)	1907-09-19	No college

Coaches
Head coach

Muggsy Miller

Legend
- (DP) Unsigned draft pick
- (FA) Free agent
- (S) Suspended
- Injured

Note: Not only would Irv Torgoff only be with the team during the ABL Playoffs (for one game) for this season, but the Reds would also be without Ben Carnevale, Chuck Huntington, Red Paris, Lou Rosenfeld, Eddie Schurmann, and Fats Wyka during that same period of time as well.

== American Basketball League Standings ==
Pos.	League Standings	Wins	Losses	Win %
1	Kingston Colonials	28	7	.800
2	Philadelphia SPHAs	24	9	.727
3	Jersey Reds	19	14	.576
4	New York Jewels	19	15	.559
5	Wilkes-Barre Barons	14	22	.389
6	Troy Haymakers	12	21	.364
7	Brooklyn Visitations	7	20	.259
8	Washington Heurichs	7	22	.241

The top four teams would later compete in a playoff format this season, with the best team competing against the third-best team and the second-best team competing against the fourth-best team through a best-of-three series in the semifinal round before the winning two teams from each round would go up against each other in a best-of-three championship series.

== American Basketball League Playoffs ==
For the first time since the 1927–28 season (or ever in terms of its revived history), the American Basketball League would host a proper playoff series for their league by the end of the regular season instead of a championship series between the two best teams on each half-season of play (with potential tiebreaker series of match-ups going down after each half-season is over and done with).

=== American Basketball League Semifinals ===
Game	Date	Opponent	Score	Record
Game 1	March 15	@ Kingston Colonials	39–32	1–0
Game 2	March 19	Kingston Colonials	25–29	1–1
Game 2	March 26	Kingston Colonials	39–36	2–1

=== American Basketball League Championship Round ===
Game	Date	Opponent	Score	Record
Game 1	March 31	Jersey Reds	30–34	0–1
Game 2	April 2	@ Jersey Reds^{[a]}	36–40	0–2
Game 3	April 9	@ Jersey Reds^{[a]}	34–37 (OT)	0–3

== Awards and honors ==
By the end of the season, Phil Rabin would end up being the leading scorer of the entire league for the third straight season in a row in its sixth season of its return and the twelfth season of its overall existence with 341 points scored for an average of 10.3 points per game. Rabin would record his third straight season of averaging at least 10 points per game in an entire season in the process there. In addition to that, he would also join Naismith Basketball Hall of Famer Bennie Borgmann as the only other player to lead the ABL in scoring (either in its original iteration or in the revived version of it) for three straight seasons in a row.

== Note ==
^{a} Games were played in Brooklyn.
