= 1933–34 Hoboken Thourots / Camden Brewers / New Britain Palaces season =

American basketball team season

- League: American Basketball League (revived original)
- Head coach: Doc Lisa (Hoboken; 0–2); Pop Morgenweck (Camden; 2–8); Henry Zaleski (New Britain; 10–14)
- General manager: Doc Lisa; Pop Morgenweck(?); Henry Zaleski(?)
- Owner(s): Doc Lisa (Hoboken); Pop Morgenweck(Camden?); Henry Zaleski(New Britain?)
- Arena: Palace Garden (Hoboken); Convention Hall (Camden); Stanley Arena (New Britain); New Britain Municipal Auditorium (New Britain)

Results
- Record: 12–24 (.333)
- Place: Conference: 8th (1st half for Hoboken / Camden / New Britain); 2nd (2nd half for New Britain)
- Playoff finish: Did not qualify

The 1933–34 Hoboken Thourots / Camden Brewers / New Britain Palaces season was the third (and final) professional basketball season played in Hoboken, New Jersey, as well as their only season played in Camden, New Jersey and the first season played in New Britain, Connecticut for this franchise that previously played as the Thourots and the Brewers before becoming the Palaces to conclude this season, which would become first season played in the revived version of the original American Basketball League. Originally, the team started out their season as the Hoboken Thourots (which was a rebranding of their previous team name of the Hoboken Lisas name when playing in the revived version of the Metropolitan Basketball League), but after losing their only games played while representing Hoboken, New Jersey out in the revived version of the ABL, the team moved their operations out to nearby Camden, New Jersey to become the Camden Brewers to finish out the rest of the 1933 year. Unfortunately for the Brewers, while they did win a couple of games under their new name, they still struggled as a franchise while playing in the state of New Jersey, which eventually led to them moving their operations out to New Britain, Connecticut for the rest of the season on January 10, 1934, to become the New Britain Palaces to not just finish the first half of the season, but also start out the second half of the season as well. As it was previously mentioned, their first half of the season would see them finish very poorly, with a 5–19 record (with two wins in Camden and three wins in New Britain) giving them an easy last place finish. However, the second half of the season would see the New Britain Palaces perform a lot better by comparison to their first half of the season, as they'd get an above-average 7–5 record that was only behind the undefeated Philadelphia SPHAs / Hebrews for a second place finish there. Unfortunately for New Britain, the second place finish there wouldn't be enough to get them qualifying for a spot in the revived ABL's championship series, with the New Britain team later deciding to rename themselves to the New Britain Jackaways for the following season not long afterward.

== Rosters ==
Due to information on American Basketball League players being generally hard to find, there are bound to be more gaps and/or inaccuracies found in certain areas on the team's roster spots than usual. However, in this particular instance, the players listed for the overall team shall be listed

=== Hoboken Thourots Roster ===
Player	Position(s)
Paulie Adamo	F
Bill Bergin	G
Hal Bosch	G/F
John Jacobs	C
Jimmy Kent	F
Joe McEnroe	G/F
Moon Stetkewicz	G/F

This team would only exist for two games before they moved to nearby Camden, New Jersey, hence the small amount of players on this particular roster.

=== Camden Brewers Roster ===
Player	Position
Paulie Adamo	F
Bill Bergin	G
George Clift	G/F
Joe Davidoff	G
Rich Deighan	C
Larry Dodick	G
Harry Hamilton	C
Carl Husta	G
John Jacobs	C
Ray Kennedy	G/F
Hank Kurtyka	G/F
Jimmy Lennon	C
Mickey McNiff	G/F
Bill Miles	C
Stretch Miller	G
Jim Picken	G/F
Moon Stetkewicz	G/F
Eddie Taylor	G/F
Worm Wearshing	F

In addition to them, there would also be a forward with the last name of Deene that would also briefly be on the team as well. Not only that, but four players from this team in Paulie Adamo, Bill Bergin, John Jacobs, and Moon Stetkewicz would end up being the only players from the prior Hoboken Thourots roster to end up joining the Camden Brewers for the first half of the season.

=== New Britain Palaces Roster ===
Player	Position(s)
Hook Anderson	G/F
Hank Arbour	G/F
Dave Bass	G/F
Gaza Chizmadia	F/C
Frank DePhillips	G/F
Stan Entrup	C
Babe Hurley	G/F
Babe Liman	G/F
Willie Putzer	G/F
Moe Spahn	G/F
Moon Stetkewicz	G/F
Henry Zaleski	G/F

Interestingly, Moon Stetkewicz would be the only player that would play for all three of the Hoboken Thourots, the Camden Brewers, and the New Britain Palaces, with no one from the Hoboken Thourots playing for the New Britain Palaces, nor would there be anyone else from the Camden Brewers joining Moon Stetkewicz to partake with the new roster in the New Britain Palaces.

== American Basketball League Standings ==
First Half
Team	Wins	Losses	Winning %
Trenton Moose	22	6	.786
Brooklyn Jewels	22	6	.786
Philadelphia SPHAs / Hebrews	15	12	.556
Brooklyn Visitations	12	12	.500
Bronx Americans	10	15	.400
Union City Reds	10	18	.357
Newark Bears	9	17	.346
Hoboken Thourots/Camden Brewers/New Britain Palaces^{[a]}	5	19	.208

Second Half
Team	Wins	Losses	Winning %
Philadelphia SPHAs / Hebrews	14	0	1.000
New Britain Palaces^{[a]}	7	5	.583
Brooklyn Jewels	4	4	.500
Trenton Moose	6	7	.462
Newark Bears	4	5	.444
Union City Reds	4	7	.364
Bronx Americans	2	6	.250
Brooklyn Visitations	1	8	.111

== Awards and honors ==
By the end of this season, Moe Spahn of the New Britain Palaces specifically (and not the Hoboken Thourots or the Camden Brewers) would end up being the leading scorer for the entire league in its first season back (and its seventh overall season of existence) with a total of 333 points scored for an average of 8.7 points per game.

== Notes ==
^{a} Became the Camden Brewers after losing their first 4 games of the season by November 23, 1933, then became the New Britain Palaces by January 10, 1934, after Camden won only two out of their next eight games, with New Britain entering the first half of the season with a 2–12 record afterward.
