= 1937–38 Jersey Reds season =

- League champions
- League: American Basketball League (revived original)
- Head coach: Muggsy Miller
- General manager: Muggsy Miller(?)
- Owner(s): Muggsy Miller(?)
- Arena: Columbia Park

Results
- Record: 29–13 (.690)
- Place: Conference: 1st (1st half); 2nd (2nd half)
- Playoff finish: ABL Champions (Won 4–2 over New York Jewels)

The 1937–38 Jersey Reds season was officially the seventh professional basketball season played by the Jersey Reds franchise and their fourth season played in the city of North Bergen, New Jersey under their proper Jersey Reds name after they previously played their first three seasons as the Union City Reds (two of which were played in the revived version of the Metropolitan Basketball League) in nearby Union City, New Jersey. Entering this season, the ABL would originally see seven teams competing in their league throughout the season, though the number would dwindle back down to six teams once again by the second half of the season due to the Bronx turned New York Yankees basketball team withdrawing from the ABL by January 11, 1938. For the first half of the season, the Jersey Reds would end up leading the league once again by having an above-average 16–6 record for a first place finish for that specific half of the season. In a chance to lead the entire league for the second half of the season (and thus be crowned champions of the ABL by default for this season), the Reds would end up getting another above average record, this time having a 13–7 record, to ultimately finish that half of the season in second place behind only the New York Jewels, who had previously played as the New Haven Jewels during the first half of the season. As a result of that finish, Jersey would compete against the rivaling New York Jewels to a chance at winning their first ever championship in the ABL. Fortunately for the Reds, following a 1–1 series tie, Jersey would end up winning three out of their next four games played afterward to have the Jersey Reds get a 4–2 series championship for their first ever championship, winning their championship years after the Union City Reds had previously lost the final Metropolitan Basketball League championship series ever played against the Brooklyn Jewels.

== Roster ==
Due to information on American Basketball League players being generally hard to find, there are bound to be more gaps and/or inaccuracies found in certain areas on the team's roster spots than usual.

1937–38 Jersey Reds roster
Players

Pos.	No.	Player	Height	Weight	DOB	From
G		Paulie Adamo	5 ft 11 in (1.80 m)	165 lb (75 kg)	1907-01-11	Panzer College
G/F		Hook Anderson	5 ft 11 in (1.80 m)	185 lb (84 kg)	1912-04-08	NYU
C		Al Benson	6 ft 5 in (1.96 m)	220 lb (100 kg)	1914-07-27	Seton Hall
G/F		Moe Frankel	5 ft 10 in (1.78 m)	190 lb (86 kg)	1913-01-25	No college
G/F		Ace Goldstein	6 ft 1 in (1.85 m)	190 lb (86 kg)	1917-03-20	CCNY
F/C		Ed Hulton	6 ft 2 in (1.88 m)	200 lb (91 kg)	1916-07-20	Georgetown
G		Bibby Martens	5 ft 9 in (1.75 m)	165 lb (75 kg)	1914-07-14	John Marshall University
G		Babe Maselan	6 ft 2 in (1.88 m)	185 lb (84 kg)	1915-11-18	Fairleigh Dickinson
F/C		Mike Michelotti	6 ft 2 in (1.88 m)	180 lb (82 kg)	1909	Bryant HS (NY)
G		Cy Schneidman	5 ft 9 in (1.75 m)	165 lb (75 kg)	1917-07-06	NYU
F		Moe Spahn	6 ft 1 in (1.85 m)	180 lb (82 kg)	1912-05-03	CCNY

Coaches
Head coach

Muggsy Miller

Legend
- (DP) Unsigned draft pick
- (FA) Free agent
- (S) Suspended
- Injured

Note: Ace Goldstein (later known as Ace Abbott), Ed Hulton, Bibby Martens, Babe Maselan, and Cy Schneidman would not be a part of the team's championship series roster for this season.

== American Basketball League Standings ==
First Half
Team	Wins	Losses	Winning %
Jersey Reds	16	6	.727
New Haven Jewels / New York Jewels^{[a]}	12	8	.600
Brooklyn Visitations	13	10	.565
Philadelphia SPHAs	12	10	.545
New York (Original) Celtics	11	10	.524
Kingston Colonials	5	15	.250
New York Yankees^{[b]}	1	11	.083

Second Half
Team	Wins	Losses	Winning %
New York Jewels^{[a]}	14	5	.737
Jersey Reds	13	7	.650
Philadelphia SPHAs	11	9	.550
Kingston Colonials	9	9	.500
New York (Original) Celtics	7	11	.389
Brooklyn Visitations	2	15	.118

== American Basketball League Championship Series ==
Earlier in the season, the New York Jewels competed in the season as the New Haven Jewels. However, due to the Jewels winning the second half of the season while representing the state of New York instead of while competing in New Haven, Connecticut, they will be referred to properly as the New York Jewels only here.

Jersey Reds (1st Half Champions) Vs. New York Jewels (2nd Half Champions): Jersey Reds win series 4–2

ABL Championship Series
Game	Date	Opponent	Score	Record
Game 1	April 2	New York Jewels	35–34	1–0
Game 2	April 3	@ New York Jewels^{[c]}	30–33	1–1
Game 3	April 9	New York Jewels	30–22	2–1
Game 4	April 10	@ New York Jewels^{[c]}	26–24	3–1
Game 5	April 13	New York Jewels	33–37	3–2
Game 6	April 17	@ New York Jewels^{[c]}	30–28	4–2

== Notes ==
^{a} Before the season began, the Brooklyn Jewels moved from Brooklyn, New York to New Haven, Connecticut to become the New Haven Jewels to start out the season. However, on November 30, 1937, the team moved back from New Haven to Brooklyn to once again return to their original New York Jewels name for the rest of the season.
^{b} The New York Yankees basketball team would drop out of the ABL on January 11, 1938, during the first half of the season.
^{c} Games were played in Brooklyn.
