= 1939–40 Jersey Reds season =

- League: American Basketball League (revived original)
- Head coach: Paulie Adamo (player-coach)
- General manager: Paulie Adamo(?)
- Owner(s): Paulie Adamo(?)
- Arena: Columbia Park

Results
- Record: 7–14 (.333)
- Place: Conference: N/A (Unofficially 7th)
- Playoff finish: Did not qualify. (Merged operations with the New York Jewels on January 26, 1940.)

The 1939–40 Jersey Reds season was officially the ninth and final professional basketball season played by the Jersey Reds franchise and their sixth and final season played in the city of North Bergen, New Jersey under their proper Jersey Reds name after they previously played their first three seasons as the Union City Reds (two of which were played in the revived version of the Metropolitan Basketball League) in nearby Union City, New Jersey. For the second straight season in a row, the ABL would have a proper regular season format instead of the previous split season formatting they had done in the past, though this season would end up concluding with a round-robin tournament to determine the league's champions instead of the prior playoff formatting they had done due (at least in part) to what would happen during this season. Originally, this season would see eight teams competing in their league once again (though it would see the newly added Baltimore Clippers replace the previously long-standing Brooklyn Visitations, with the Washington Heurichs works team be rebranded into the Washington Heurich Brewers), but by the end of the season, the ABL would drop down to only five viable competing teams in their league due to a combination of mergers and a surprise exit from the league near the end of the season. Unfortunately for the Reds, they would end up being one of the teams that would get merged with another team, as financial issues (which could be noted by long-time head coach Muggsy Miller being replaced with player-coach Paulie Adamo for this season) resulted in the Jersey Reds franchise ironically merging operations with the rivaling New York Jewels team on January 26, 1940, which became the second merger of the season after the Troy Haymakers merged operations with the better (on paper) Kingston Colonials on December 19, 1939, to become the Troy Celtics for the rest of the season going forward. However, unlike the first team merger of the season, this team merger would not see any name changes occur, as the Jersey Reds franchise folded operations entirely near the end of January 1940 with a 7–14 record for a seventh place finish while the New York Jewels continued operating as they had intended to do so. This later led to the Jewels having a fourth place finish to the regular season with an average 15–15 record, but a third place finish in the ABL's Round-Robin Tournament behind the Troy Celtics and the Philadelphia Sphas.

== Roster ==
Due to information on American Basketball League players being generally hard to find, there are bound to be more gaps and/or inaccuracies found in certain areas on the team's roster spots than usual.

1939–40 Jersey Reds roster
Players

Pos.	No.	Player	Height	Weight	DOB	From
G		Paulie Adamo	5 ft 11 in (1.80 m)	165 lb (75 kg)	1907-01-11	Panzer College
G/F		Hook Anderson	5 ft 11 in (1.80 m)	185 lb (84 kg)	1912-04-08	NYU
C		Al Benson	6 ft 5 in (1.96 m)	220 lb (100 kg)	1914-07-27	Seton Hall
F		Cy Boardman	6 ft 2 in (1.88 m)	185 lb (84 kg)	1915-08-24	NYU
G		Harry Fitzgerald	5 ft 9 in (1.75 m)	170 lb (77 kg)	1913-05-22	No college
F		Jim Gallagher	5 ft 11 in (1.80 m)	180 lb (82 kg)	1915-07-24	Saint Peter's
G/F		Ace Goldstein	6 ft 1 in (1.85 m)	190 lb (86 kg)	1917-03-20	CCNY
G		Mike Jarmon	5 ft 10 in (1.78 m)	160 lb (73 kg)	1918-12-25	CCNY
F		Danny Kaplowitz	6 ft 1 in (1.85 m)	187 lb (85 kg)	1917-04-07	Long Island
G/F		Tommy O'Brien	5 ft 8 in (1.73 m)	165 lb (75 kg)	1916-02-16	George Washington
G		Cy Schneidman	5 ft 9 in (1.75 m)	165 lb (75 kg)	1917-07-06	NYU
F		Moe Spahn	6 ft 1 in (1.85 m)	180 lb (82 kg)	1912-05-03	CCNY

Coaches
Head coach

Paulie Adamo

Legend
- (DP) Unsigned draft pick
- (FA) Free agent
- (S) Suspended
- Injured

== American Basketball League Standings ==
Pos.	League Standings	Wins	Losses	Win %
T–1	Philadelphia SPHAs^{[a]}	19	13	.594
T–1	Washington Heurich Brewers^{[a]}	19	13	.594
3	Troy Celtics^{[b]}	19	15	.559
4	New York Jewels^{[c]}	15	15	.500
5	Baltimore Clippers	15	16	.484
6*	Kingston Colonials^{[b]}	8	4	.667
7*	Jersey Reds^{[c]}	7	14	.333
8*	Troy Haymakers^{[b]}	3	9	.250
9*	Wilkes-Barre Barons^{[d]}	5	17	.227

* – Unofficial placement for the team this season.

== Notes ==
^{a} The Philadelphia Sphas would defeat the Washington Heurich Brewers on March 9, 1940, with a 34–27 final score to secure first place officially with what could be considered a 20–13 record (.606 win percentage) on the Sphas' end and a 19–14 record (.576 win percentage) on the Heurich Brewers' end instead of an officially recorded 19–13 record (.594 win percentage) for both teams.
^{b} Despite being tied with the Sphas for what could be considered as the best team in the ABL at that point in time during this season with an 8–4 record, the Kingston Colonials would end up merging operations with the Troy Haymakers to become the Troy Celtics (which could really be considered the spiritual successors of the Original Celtics franchise under a different location and name) on December 19, 1939, with the merged franchises foolishly continuing under the Troy Haymakers' 3–9 record instead of the Kingston Colonials' 8–4 record (likely because of the decision to have the merged franchise continue playing in Troy, New York instead of continuing to play and operate nearby Kingston, New York).
^{c} Both the previous ABL champion Jersey Reds and the defending ABL champion New York Jewels would merge operations on January 26, 1940, to remain as the New York Jewels for the rest of the season, with the Jewels franchise continuing on with the same win–loss record that they had before the merger occurred (with that record remaining intact as if nothing had happened with them due to them being the surviving team within the merger while the Jersey Reds effectively folded operations with a 7–14 record this season) while also making sure the Jewels franchise survived operations for at least another season.
^{d} The (original) Wilkes-Barre Barons ABL franchise dropped out of the league before officially finishing their season with the ABL on February 2, 1940, with the Barons leaving the league with the worst record of the entire league that season at 5–17.
