= 1936–37 Jersey Reds season =

- League: American Basketball League (revived original)
- Head coach: Muggsy Miller
- General manager: Muggsy Miller(?)
- Owner(s): Muggsy Miller(?)
- Arena: Columbia Park

Results
- Record: 26–12 (.684)
- Place: Conference: 1st (1st half); 2nd (2nd half)
- Playoff finish: Lost ABL championship 4–3 to the Philadelphia Sphas / Hebrews.

The 1936–37 Jersey Reds season was officially the sixth professional basketball season played by the Jersey Reds franchise and their third season played in the city of North Bergen, New Jersey under their proper Jersey Reds name after they previously played their first three seasons as the Union City Reds (two of which were played in the revived version of the Metropolitan Basketball League) in nearby Union City, New Jersey. Entering this season, the ABL would technically see six teams competing in their league throughout the entire season, though they wouldn't be the same six teams throughout the entire season due to the Atlantic City Sandpipers / Sand Snipers (who took over the spot held by the Passaic Red Devils at the time) being replaced by the New York Celtics (who technically would be related to the famous Original Celtics team) when going from the first half of the season to the second half of the season. For the first half of the season, the Reds would finally return to the best success that they had since their brief time in the revived Metropolitan Basketball League back when they were in Union City as the Jersey franchise would get a well above-average 14–4 record to get a first place finish in that particular half of the season. As for the second half of the season, while Jersey would still do well enough for an above-average 12–8 finish on that particular half of the season, the Reds ultimately would get a second place finish for that half of the season behind the Philadelphia SPHAs / Hebrews. Due to the split season formatting used for this season, the ABL's championship series would consist of the two best teams from each half-season of play, which would be the Jersey Reds and the Philadelphia SPHAs / Hebrews in this case. Initially, the Reds looked like they would get their first championship in franchise history with them being ahead 3–1 in the best-of-seven series being played after Philadelphia won the first game of the series. Unfortunately for Jersey, Philadelphia would end up bouncing back with two close matches (one of which might have been a game that went into an overtime period) and a blowout win to have the Philadelphia SPHAs / Hebrews upset the Jersey Reds 4–3 after the Reds initially had a commanding series lead, which denied the Jersey Reds their first ABL championship series in the process.

== Roster ==
Due to information on American Basketball League players being generally hard to find, there are bound to be more gaps and/or inaccuracies found in certain areas on the team's roster spots than usual.

1936–37 Jersey Reds roster
Players

Pos.	No.	Player	Height	Weight	DOB	From
G		Paulie Adamo	5 ft 11 in (1.80 m)	165 lb (75 kg)	1907-01-11	Panzer College
G/F		Hook Anderson	5 ft 11 in (1.80 m)	185 lb (84 kg)	1912-04-08	NYU
C		Al Benson	6 ft 5 in (1.96 m)	220 lb (100 kg)	1914-07-27	Seton Hall
G/F		Moe Frankel	5 ft 10 in (1.78 m)	190 lb (86 kg)	1913-01-25	No college
G		Tony Kappen	5 ft 10 in (1.78 m)	165 lb (75 kg)	1919-04-13	Forest Hills HS (NY)
G		Bibby Martens	5 ft 9 in (1.75 m)	165 lb (75 kg)	1914-07-14	John Marshall University
F/C		Mike Michelotti	6 ft 2 in (1.88 m)	180 lb (82 kg)	1909	Bryant HS (NY)
G		Willie Scrill	5 ft 10 in (1.78 m)	175 lb (79 kg)	1907-09-01	No college
F		Moe Spahn	6 ft 1 in (1.85 m)	180 lb (82 kg)	1912-05-03	CCNY

Coaches
Head coach

Muggsy Miller

Legend
- (DP) Unsigned draft pick
- (FA) Free agent
- (S) Suspended
- Injured

Note: Tony Kappen would not be a part of the team's championship series roster for this season due in part to him still being in high school at 17 years old at the time.

== American Basketball League Standings ==
First Half
Team	Wins	Losses	Winning %
Jersey Reds	14	4	.778
Philadelphia SPHAs / Hebrews	12	6	.667
Kingston Colonials	11	6	.647
New York Jewels^{[a]}	7	10	.412
Paterson Visitations / Brooklyn Visitations^{[b]}	4	12	.250
Atlantic City Sandpipers / Sand Snipers^{[c]}	0	10	.000

Second Half
Team	Wins	Losses	Winning %
Philadelphia SPHAs / Hebrews	14	6	.700
Jersey Reds	12	8	.600
Brooklyn Visitations^{[b]}	10	9	.526
New York (Original) Celtics^{[d]}	10	10	.500
Kingston Colonials	9	11	.450
Brooklyn Jewels^{[a]}	4	15	.211

== American Basketball League Championship Series ==
Jersey Reds (1st Half Champions) Vs. Philadelphia SPHAs / Hebrews (2nd Half Champions): Philadelphia SPHAs / Hebrews win series 4–3

ABL Championship Series
Game	Date	Opponent	Score	Record
Game 1	March 27	@ Philadelphia SPHAs / Hebrews	36–31	1–0
Game 2	March 28	Philadelphia SPHAs / Hebrews	36–39	1–1
Game 3	April 3	@ Philadelphia SPHAs / Hebrews	34–28	2–1
Game 4	April 4	Philadelphia SPHAs / Hebrews	34–30	3–1
Game 5	April 10	@ Philadelphia SPHAs / Hebrews	33–34	3–2
Game 6	April 14	Philadelphia SPHAs / Hebrews	23–45	3–3
Game 7	April 17	@ Philadelphia SPHAs / Hebrews	43–44 (OT)	3–4

== Notes ==
^{a} Originally, the New York Jewels played as the New York Jewels for the first half of the season. However, by the start of the second half of the season, the team would rebrand themselves to the Brooklyn Jewels (likely because of the inclusion of the New York (Original) Celtics for the second half of the season following the departure of the Atlantic City Sandpipers / Sand Snipers near the end of the first half of the season) for the rest of that season only going forward.
^{b} The Brooklyn Visitations originally moved from Brooklyn, New York to Paterson, New Jersey to become the Paterson Visitations early on before the first half of the season began. However, by November 23, 1936, the Visitations would decide to move back from Paterson, New Jersey to Brooklyn, New York to become the Brooklyn Visitations once again for the rest of the season going forward.
^{c} After losing all ten of their regular season games in the first half of the season, the Atlantic City Sandpipers / Sand Snipers would drop out of the ABL entirely by December 21, 1936.
^{d} For the second half of the season, the New York (Original) Celtics would return to the ABL by entering the league for that specific half of the season by January 3, 1937, and playing in the ABL for the rest of the season going forward.
