= 1946–47 Newark Bobcats / Kingston Chiefs / Yonkers Chiefs season =

American Basketball League season

- League: American Basketball League (revived original)
- Head coach: Moe Frankel (Newark's player-coach; 3–8); Rody Cooney (Kingston/Yonkers; 4–9)
- General manager: Moe Frankel(?); Rody Cooney(?)
- Arena: Unknown (Newark Armory? (Newark)) (Kingston State Armory (Kingston)) (Yonkers Armory? (Yonkers))

Results
- Record: 7–17 (.292)
- Place: Division: 5th (Northern)
- Playoff finish: Did not qualify. (The Yonkers Chiefs folded operations during the month of February in 1947.)

The 1946–47 Newark Bobcats / Kingston Chiefs / Yonkers Chiefs season was the first and only season of play for the team that previously started out as the Newark Bobcats in Newark, New Jersey before they ended up moving to Kingston, New York to become the Kingston Chiefs for a bit of time before they moved out to nearby Yonkers, New York days later to become the Yonkers Chiefs for the rest of the season before they folded operations by February 1947. Entering this season, this team would be involved with the ABL's biggest point of existence in its entire overall history as an expansion franchise for this season, with ten total teams competing in the newly created Northern and Southern divisions (instead of using the typical Eastern and Western divisions like the ABL had done back in the 1927–28 season), with five teams (including this particularly unique squad) being in the Northern Division and five teams being in the Southern Division. Originally, due in part to the ABL deciding to make their regular season games be played (mostly) on the weekend periods of time due to players there being paid well enough in their regular jobs outside of the ABL instead of trying to compete against both of the rivaling National Basketball League and the newly created Basketball Association of America in that regard, the struggling Newark Bobcats would end up moving from Newark, New Jersey to Kingston, New York on December 23, 1946 (though with the initial belief that the team didn't change their name to the Kingston Chiefs at the time) in the hopes of having better luck in terms of performance there even after they had previously competed against the eventual champion Chicago American Gears from the rivaling National Basketball League in an exhibition match during this season. Unfortunately for this newly relocated (and rebranded) team, even with them moving from New Jersey to New York during this season, this team would still see themselves seriously struggle even against the rest of the league's own competition, to the point where the team would relocate (and once again) from Kingston to nearby Yonkers to become the Yonkers Chiefs for the rest of their existence on Yonkers Chiefs on January 22, 1947. This change would prove to be a very minimal one for the Chiefs, as after a few games played in Yonkers, the team would end up folding operations during the season around the middle of February that year with a 7–17 record, which led to the ABL's regular season being inconsistent for the rest of the league in terms of games played in the process.

== Roster ==
Due to information on American Basketball League players being generally hard to find (especially by the time the ABL was designated more as a minor league during its later years of existence), there are bound to be more gaps and/or inaccuracies found in certain areas on the team's roster spots than usual.

Player	Position(s)
Al Benson	C
Sid Blair	F
Sol Broder	F
Gerry Bussell	C
Johnny Cerrone	G
Al Cito	Unknown
Ed Conaty	G
Red Dehnert	F
Joe Dinkwoods	Unknown
Larry Dodick	G
Moe Frankel	G
Moe Goldman	F/C
Ed Golub	Unknown
Bill Henry	Unknown
Tony Krygier	G/F
Lenny Lesser	Unknown
Artie Lockheed	Unknown
Swede Masin	G/F
Jack McGuirk	F/C
Abe Novak	G/F
Jackie Peters	G/F
Marty Powers	Unknown
Max Scharf	Unknown
Lou Simon	G
Red Stevens	Unknown

Currently, there's no known notion of who played for the Newark Bobcats, who played for the Kingston Chiefs, and/or who played for the Yonkers Chiefs during this team's only season of play. In addition to that, center Don Otten would sign up with the team as well, though he's yet to be confirmed to show up for a box score in a match this team played in. Not only that, but the team also would briefly have a player with the last name of Barrett and a player with the last name of Pine show up as members of the team at some point in time as well.

== American Basketball League Season Standings ==
Due to the number of teams in the ABL this season, this would mark the first time since the 1927–28 season where the ABL would utilize divisions within their league in a proper manner, though unlike that season, the ABL would utilize a Northern Division (which this unique franchise competed in throughout most of this season) and a Southern Division instead of the typical Eastern Division and Western Division that had been on display for most other professional leagues at the time.

=== Northern Division ===
Pos.	Team	Wins	Losses	Win %
1	Brooklyn Gothams - y	24	10	.706
2	Jersey City Atoms - x	14	22	.389
3	Troy Celtics	13	22	.371
4	Paterson Crescents	11	23	.324
5	Newark Bobcats / Kingston Chiefs / Yonkers Chiefs^{a} †	7	17	.292

† – Did not survive the ABL season.

=== Southern Division ===
Pos.	Team	Wins	Losses	Win %
1	Baltimore Bullets - z	31	3	.919
2	Philadelphia Sphas - x	19	14	.675
3	Trenton Tigers - x	17	17	.500
4	Elizabeth Braves - x	15	18	.455
5	Wilmington Bombers	15	20	.429

== Notes ==
^{a} The Newark Bobcats first transferred their franchise from Newark, New Jersey to Kingston, New York on December 23, 1946 (though they did not necessarily change their team name at the time (but if they did, they would have changed it to the Kingston Chiefs instead)) and then moved to nearby Yonkers, New York to become the Yonkers Chiefs on January 22, 1947, before folding operations entirely by the middle of February in 1947.
