= Camden Brewers =

American basketball team in 1933-34

The Camden Brewers were an American basketball team based in Camden, New Jersey, that was a short-lived member of the American Basketball League. They replaced the Hoboken Thourots in December 1933, and became the New Britain Palaces in January 1934.

The franchise was founded as the Hoboken Lisas, who played two seasons from 1931 to 1933 in the Metropolitan Basketball League. They began the 1933-34 season in the ABL as the Hoboken Thourots, (Note: Biesel's book lists them as the North Hudson Thourots, but Peterson's book and a 1933 Brooklyn Eagle newspaper article both list them as Hoboken.) but were replaced by Camden after two games, both losses. After ten more games, in which they went 2-8, the team moved again and became the New Britain Palaces on January 8, 1934.

== Year-by-year ==
Year	League	Reg. season	Playoffs
1933/34 (1st half)	ABL	0-2 (as Hoboken); 2-8 (as Camden); 3-9 (as New Britain)	N/A
