= Honey Russell =

American professional basketball player and coach

- Russell, c. 1946

Personal information
- Born: May 31, 1902 Brooklyn, New York, U.S.
- Died: November 15, 1973 (aged 71) Livingston, New Jersey, U.S.
- Listed height: 6 ft 1 in (1.85 m)
- Listed weight: 175 lb (79 kg)

Career information
- High school: Alexander Hamilton (Brooklyn, New York)
- Playing career: 1920–1945
- Position: Guard
- Coaching career: 1927–1960

Career history

Playing
- 1920–1921: Plymouth Shawnees
- 1920–1922: Easthampton Hampers
- 1921–1923: Brooklyn Pros
- 1921–1922: Mohawk Indians
- 1921–1923: Albany Senators
- 1922–1923: Northampton Hampers
- 1923–1924: Yonkers Leaguers
- 1923–1925: Cleveland Rosenblooms
- 1924–1925: Original Celtics
- 1925–1927: Cleveland Rosenblums
- 1925–1926: Lou Gehrig All Stars
- 1926–1930: Chicago Bruins
- 1928–1929: Rochester Centrals
- 1930–1931: Paterson Crescents
- 1930–1931: Bridgeton Moose
- 1930–1931: Carbondale
- 1931–1932: Bridgeton
- 1931–1933: Brooklyn Americans
- 1932–1933: Trenton Bengals
- 1932–1933: Brooklyn Jewels
- 1932–1934: Dunmore
- 1933–1934: Trenton Moose
- 1934–1935: Newark / New Britain Mules
- 1934–1935: Nanticoke
- 1934–1936: Freeland
- 1934–1935: Albany
- 1935–1939: New York Jewels
- 1936–1937: Hazleton
- 1937–1938: Allentown
- 1937–1938: Wilkes-Barre
- 1937–1938: New York Hakoah
- 1937–1938: New York Kate Smith Celtics
- 1938–1939: Allentown-Hamburg
- 1938–1939: Tunkhannock
- 1938–1940: New York Yankees
- 1939–1940: Wilkes-Barre Barons
- 1939–1940: Hamburg
- 1939–1940: Washington Brewers
- 1942–1943: Wilmington Clippers
- 1942–1944: Camden / Brooklyn Indians
- 1944–1945: New York Westchesters
- 1944–1945: Jersey Reds

Coaching
- 1927–1930: Chicago Bruins
- 1934–1935: Newark / New Britain Mules
- 1934–1935: Albany
- 1936–1937: New York Jewels
- 1936–1943: Seton Hall
- 1937–1938: New York Kate Smith Celtics
- 1939–1940: Wilkes-Barre Barons
- 1942–1944: Camden / Brooklyn Indians
- 1944–1945: New York Westchesters
- 1945–1946: Trenton
- 1945–1946: Manhattan
- 1946–1948: Boston Celtics
- 1948–1950: Schenectady Packers
- 1949–1960: Seton Hall

Career highlights
- As player: 2× ABL champion (1926, 1939); 4× ABL All-Star (1926–1929); As coach: NIT champion (1953)
- Stats at Basketball Reference
- Basketball Hall of Fame

John David "Honey" Russell (May 31, 1902 – November 15, 1973) was an American basketball player and coach who was inducted into the Naismith Memorial Basketball Hall of Fame in 1964. He turned professional after his sophomore year of high school, and for the next 28 years he played for numerous early 20th century pro teams, including many in the American Basketball League. His career included over 3,200 pro games (a number that would take a modern NBA player 30–40 years to equal). He was the first coach of the NBA's Boston Celtics (1946–1948).

Russell coached basketball at Seton Hall University from 1936 to 1943 and again from 1949 to 1960. His teams won 294 games and lost 137. In 1940 and 1941, Seton Hall ran its winning streak to 43 games, a national record at the time. The 1952–53 team won the National Invitation Tournament at Madison Square Garden in New York City. That team won 31 games, including 27 in a row, while only losing 2 games.

Russell also was a scout in professional baseball, working for the Atlanta Braves, Montreal Expos and Chicago White Sox. Of the many players he signed, 23 made it to the major leagues, including Joe and Frank Torre, Don McMahon, and Earl Williams.

== Head coaching record ==
=== NCAA ===
Record table
Season	Team	Overall	Conference	Standing	Postseason
Seton Hall Pirates (Independent) (1936–1943)
1936–37	Seton Hall	5–10			
1937–38	Seton Hall	10–8			
1938–39	Seton Hall	15–7			
1939–40	Seton Hall	19–0			
1940–41	Seton Hall	20–2			NIT Third-place game
1941–42	Seton Hall	16–3			
1942–43	Seton Hall	16–2			
Manhattan Jaspers (Metropolitan New York Conference) (1945–1946)
1945–46	Manhattan	15–8	2–4	5th	
Manhattan:		15–8 (.652)	2–4 (.333)		
Seton Hall Pirates (Independent) (1949–1960)
1949–50	Seton Hall	11–15			
1950–51	Seton Hall	24–7			NIT Third-place game
1951–52	Seton Hall	25–3			NIT First round
1952–53	Seton Hall	31–2			NIT Champions
1953–54	Seton Hall	13–10			
1954–55	Seton Hall	17–9			NIT First round
1955–56	Seton Hall	20–5			NIT Quarterfinals
1956–57	Seton Hall	17–10			NIT First round
1957–58	Seton Hall	7–19			
1958–59	Seton Hall	13–10			
1959–60	Seton Hall	16–7			
Seton Hall:		295–129 (.696)			
Total:		310–137 (.694)			
National champion Postseason invitational champion Conference regular season champion Conference regular season and conference tournament champion Division regular season champion Division regular season and conference tournament champion Conference tournament champion

=== BAA ===
Legend
Regular season	G	Games coached	W	Games won	L	Games lost	W–L %	Win–loss %
Playoffs	PG	Playoff games	PW	Playoff wins	PL	Playoff losses	PW–L %	Playoff win–loss %

Team	Year	G	W	L	W–L%	Finish	PG	PW	PL	PW–L%	Result
Boston	1946–47	60	22	38	.367	5th in Eastern	—	—	—	—	Missed playoffs
Boston	1947–48	48	20	28	.345	3rd in Eastern	3	1	2	.333	Lost in Quarterfinals
Total		108	42	66	.356		3	1	2	.333	
