= Al Benson (basketball) =

American basketball player (born 1914)

Personal information
- Born: July 27, 1914 Hoboken, New Jersey, U.S.
- Listed height: 6 ft 6 in (1.98 m)
- Listed weight: 240 lb (109 kg)
- Position: Center

Career history
- 1933–1934: New York Nationals
- 1934–1940: Jersey Reds
- 1934–1935: Albany
- 1934–1935: Atlantic City
- 1937–1938: Myerstown Memorials
- 1939–1942: New York Jewels
- 1940: Hammond Ciesar All-Americans
- 1940–1941: Detroit Eagles
- 1941–1942: Kingston Recreations
- 1942: Wilmington Blue Bombers
- 1942: Washington Brewers
- 1945–1946: Baltimore Bullets
- 1945–1946: Pittston
- 1946–1947: Nanticoke
- 1946–1947: Newark Bobcats
- 1947: Troy Celtics
- 1947: Paterson Crescents
- 1947–1948: Paterson
- 1947–1948: Glen Falls
- 1949–1950: Schenectady Packers

Career highlights
- 2× ABL champion (1938, 1946)

Albert L. Benson (born July 27, 1914, date of death unknown) was an American professional basketball player. He played in the National Basketball League for the Hammond Ciesar All-Americans and Detroit Eagles in 1940–41 and averaged 1.6 points per game.

== Early life ==
Benson was born in Hoboken, New Jersey on July 24, 1914. He served in the U.S. Army during the World War II era and was discharged in March 1946.
