= Newark Bears (basketball) =

Defunct American basketball team

Newark Bears/Mules
- Game: Basketball
- Founded: 1933
- Folded: 1935
- League: American Basketball League
- Team history: Newark Bears (1933-1934); Newark Mules (1934-1935)
- Based in: Newark, New Jersey, USA

The Newark Bears (also known as the Joe Fays and Newark Mules) was a short lived American basketball team based in Newark, New Jersey, that was a member of the American Basketball League (ABL). The team was renamed as the Newark Mules in 1934, and folded on January 18, 1935, following a merger with the New Britan Jackaways to become the New Britain Mules.

== History ==
The Bears began play in the 1933-34 season, with head coach Abe Schartoff. In the Bears first season, they finished with a record of 13 wins and 22 losses. Bennie Borgmann led the team in points with 321. Their second and final season, they Bears were renamed as the Newark Mules was led by head coach John "Honey" Russell. Borgmann again led the team in points, with 258. On January 18, 1935, the Newark Mules folded following a merger with the New Britan Jackaways to become the New Britain Mules.

== Season-by-season record ==
Year	League	GP	W	L	Finish	Playoffs
1933-34	ABL	35	13	22	7th (1st half); 5th (2nd half)	Did not qualify
1934-35	ABL	24	12	12	4th (1st half)	N/A (Team folded)

== Head coaches ==
- Abe Schartoff (1933-34)
- Joe Dreyfus (1934)
- John "Honey" Russell (1935)
