= New Britain Mules =

- League: American Basketball League
- Founded: 1933
- Dissolved: 1935
- History: Hoboken Thourots (1933); Camden Brewers (1933–1934); New Britain Palaces (1934); New Britain Jackaways (1934–1935); New Britain Mules (1935)
- Arena: Stanley Arena (1934); New Britain Municipal Auditorium (1935)
- Location: New Britain, Connecticut

New Britain, Connecticut, had a professional basketball team in the American Basketball League (ABL) from 1934 to 1935. The Palaces played during the 1933/34 season after having taken over the Camden Brewers, who themselves had taken over the Hoboken Thourots earlier in the season. The team was renamed to the Jackaways prior to the 1934/35 season, and in the second half of the 1934/35 season were replaced by the Newark Mules, who became the New Britain Mules. They folded following the 1934/35 season.

== History ==
The American Basketball League (ABL) was founded in 1925 as one of the first professional basketball leagues and played through 1931 before suspending operations. The league returned for the 1933/34 season while featuring eight teams. One of those teams, the Hoboken Thourots, folded two weeks into the season after going winless and were replaced by the Camden Brewers in November 1933. The Brewers took on the Thourots' 0–2 record but struggled themselves, going 2–8 in first half play. Coach Pop Morgenweck of Camden "found it difficult to keep a strong team" and later the team was placed in the possession of the ABL. The league's president, John O'Brien, decided to relocate the team to New Britain, Connecticut, in January 1934.

The Palaces entered the first half of the 1933/34 season with 12 games to play and played their home games at Stanley Arena in New Britain. Their starting five featured Dave Bass, league scoring leader Moe Spahn, Willie Putzer, Moon Stetkewicz and Stan Entrup. The Palaces ended the first half of the season with a record of 3–9, eighth and last in the league. Despite their losing record in the first half, the Palaces greatly improved in the second half and finished second place with a record of 7–5, losing the title to the undefeated Philadelphia Hebrews; when they played the Hebrews, New Britain lost by a mere two points. According to a Record-Journal report, the New Britain team had come to be regarded as "one of the outstanding pro teams in the country." After the ABL season, the Palaces played an exhibition against the proclaimed "world champion" Original Celtics, a franchise later inducted into the Naismith Memorial Basketball Hall of Fame, and defeated them by a score of 32–18, which included outscoring them 18–2 in the first half.

The league returned with seven teams for the 1934/35 season and the New Britain franchise was renamed to the Jackaways. The team placed last in ABL first half play with a record of 6–14, dropping out before its end. The team officially disbanded on January 18, 1935, and as a solution, the league moved the Newark Mules to New Britain and renamed them the New Britain Mules. All of the Jackaways players were sent to other ABL teams except for Dave Bass, who was the only player for both the Jackaways and Mules. Other players for the Mules included Hall of Famers Bennie Borgmann and Honey Russell, as well as Rusty Saunders and Tiny Hearn (one of the first tall basketball players at 6 feet 9 inches (2.06 m)). The New Britain Mules, who only played in the second half, placed third in the league with a record of 9–9. The team did not return for the 1935/36 season.

== Year-by-year ==
Year	League	Reg. season	Playoffs
1933/34	ABL	8th (1st half); 2nd (2nd half)	Did not qualify
1934/35	ABL	7th (1st half); 3rd (2nd half)	Did not qualify
