= Bennie Borgmann =

American basketball player and coach (1900–1978)

Personal information
- Born: November 22, 1900 Haledon, New Jersey, U.S.
- Died: November 11, 1978 (aged 77) Hawthorne, New Jersey, U.S.
- Listed height: 5 ft 8 in (1.73 m)
- Listed weight: 165 lb (75 kg)

Career information
- High school: Clifton (Clifton, New Jersey)
- Playing career: 1919–1936
- Position: Guard
- Coaching career: 1926–1954

Career history

Playing
- 1919–1920: Paterson Silk Sox
- 1919–1920: Paterson Kleen Maids
- 1920–1921: Paterson
- 1921–1922: Paterson Powers Brothers
- 1921–1923: Kingston
- 1921–1923: Springfield Gunners
- 1922–1927: Paterson Legionnaires
- 1923–1924: Cohoes Trojans
- 1924–1925: Tri-Council
- 1925–1926: Original Celtics
- 1926–1927: Kingston Raiders
- 1926–1930: Fort Wayne Hoosiers
- 1929–1930: Paterson Whirlwinds
- 1930–1931: Paterson Crescents
- 1930–1931: Chicago Bruins
- 1930–1931: Honsdale
- 1931–1932: Bridgeton Moose
- 1931–1932: Long Island Pro-Imps
- 1932–1933: Paterson Continentals
- 1932–1933: Brooklyn Americans
- 1932–1933: Bridgeton Gems
- 1933–1934: Newark Joe Fays
- 1934–1935: Newark/New Britain Mules
- 1935–1936: Paterson Panthers / Trenton Moose / Passiac Reds

Career highlights
- As player: Metropolitan League champion (1923); NYSPBL champion (1923); 3× ABL scoring leader (1929–1931)
- Basketball Hall of Fame

Bernhard Borgmann Jr. (November 22, 1900 – November 11, 1978) was an American professional basketball player and coach.

Born in Haledon, New Jersey, he played for 17 years between 1919 and 1936 and is mostly known for his time with the Kingston Colonials and Original Celtics. Borgmann is regarded as the best offensive player of his era, leading various leagues in scoring 15 times in a 12-year span. He also served as the first coach of the Syracuse Nationals of the National Basketball League—now the NBA's Philadelphia 76ers—from 1946 to 1948. He was inducted into the Naismith Memorial Basketball Hall of Fame in 1961.

Borgmann also played as a middle infielder in the baseball minor leagues from 1928 to 1942, managed in the minors from until 1950, and scouted until 1974. He died in Hawthorne, New Jersey, where he had been a longtime resident.

Borgmann was featured in the book Basketball History in Syracuse, Hoops Roots by Mark Allen Baker, published by The History Press in 2010.
