= Boston Trojans =

American basketball team

The Boston Trojans were an American basketball team based in Boston, Massachusetts that was a member of the American Basketball League.

== Year-by-year ==
Year	League	Reg. season	Playoffs
1934/35	ABL	5th (1st half); 6th (2nd half)	Did not qualify

== Notable players ==
Notable players with the Original Celtics include:

- Lou Bender (1910–2009), pioneer player with the Columbia Lions and in early pro basketball, who was later a successful trial attorney.
