= Jersey Reds (basketball) =

The Jersey Reds were an American basketball team based in North Bergen, New Jersey that was a member of the American Basketball League.

The team was previously known as the Union City Reds. During the 1939/40 season, the team was merged into the New York Jewels on January 26, 1940.

== Year-by-year ==
Year	League	Reg. season	Playoffs
1934/35	ABL	6th (1st half); 4th (2nd half)	Did not qualify
1935/36	ABL	4th (1st half); 2nd (2nd half)	Did not qualify
1936/37	ABL	1st (1st half); 2nd (2nd half)	Finals
1937/38	ABL	1st (1st half); 2nd (2nd half)	Champions
1938/39	ABL	3rd	Finals
1939/40	ABL	7th*	N/A
