= Moe Spahn =

American basketball player (1912–1991)

Personal information
- Born: May 3, 1912 New York City, U.S.
- Died: June 11, 1991 (aged 79) Manhattan, New York, U.S.
- Listed height: 6 ft 0 in (1.83 m)
- Listed weight: 185 lb (84 kg)

Career information
- High school: Bryant (Queens, New York)
- College: CCNY (1930–1933)
- Playing career: 1932–1943
- Position: Guard

Career history

Playing
- 1932–1933: Brooklyn Visitations
- 1932–1933: Original Celtics
- 1933–1934: Newark–New Britain
- 1934–1935: New Britain Jackaways / Boston Trojans / New Britain Mules
- 1934–1935: Freeland–Pittston
- 1935–1936: Kingston Colonials / Jersey
- 1935–1938: Pittston
- 1935–1939: Jersey Reds
- 1937–1938: Reading
- 1938–1939: Original Celtics
- 1939–1940: Jersey–New York
- 1940–1941: New York Jewels
- 1941–1942: New York / Wilmington Blue Bombers
- 1941–1942: Saratoga
- 1942–1943: Camden / Brooklyn Indians
- 1942–1943: Original Celtics
- 1942–1943: Wilmington Clippers

Coaching
- 1932–193?: Army (assistant)
- 1934–19??: CCNY (assistant)

Career highlights
- ABL MVP (1938); 2× ABL champion (1938, 1942); Second-team All-American – College Humor (1932)

Morris C. Spahn (May 3, 1912 – June 11, 1991) was an American basketball player.

== Early life, and college basketball career ==
Spahn, who was Jewish, was born in New York City, New York. He attended Bryant High School, in Queens, New York, where he played basketball.

He attended City College of New York (CCNY), where he was an All-American and All-Metropolitan basketball player at the guard position under coach Nat Holman in 1932 and 1933, leading the team to a 32–2 record over those two years. He was captain of the team in his senior year, and eighth in scoring in the Metropolitan area. After he graduated, he became an assistant coach at CCNY under Nat Holman, as he worked toward a master's degree. He earned a Ph.D. in education from New York University.

== Professional basketball career ==
Spahn became a professional basketball player in 1934. He played for a number of teams in the American Basketball League (ABL)—the Brooklyn Visitations, the Jersey Reds, and the New York Jewels. He played on two ABL championship teams (1938, 1942).

In his rookie season with the Reds, he led the league in scoring. He finished fifth in the league in scoring in 1936 (as Bobby McDermott led the league), and fourth in 1937. In 1938, he was second in the league in scoring, and the Reds won the championship. The next year, he was third in scoring. In 1940–41 he was fifth in scoring in the league, as Petey Rosenberg led the league in scoring. In 1941–42, he was eighth in scoring, for the Wilmington Bombers, who won the regular season to claim the ABL championship.

He was that ABL Most Valuable Player (MVP) runner-up in 1935-36 and 1936–37. He won the ABL MVP Award in 1937–38, winning the David Soden Trophy.

He retired in 1943, and finished as the fifth all-time leading scorer in ABL history. From 1934 to 1938, he led the ABL in free throws made. He was inducted into the International Jewish Sports Hall of Fame in 1993. He was also inducted into the City College of New York Athletic Hall of Fame. Hall of Famer Nat Holman said he was among the 10 greatest players of all time.

== Life after basketball ==
He later became a camp director and private school headmaster. He was headmaster of the Franklin School (later known as the Anglo-American International School) in Manhattan from 1950 to 1975, director of Camp Winaukee in New Hampshire from 1938 to 1975, and director of the Tripp Lake Camp in Maine from 1958 to 1982. He was also a president of the Association of Private Camps. In addition, he coached basketball teams at West Point.

His son Steve Spahn was an All-Ivy League basketball player for Dartmouth College in the 1960s.

He died of heart failure at the New York University Medical Center in Manhattan at the age of 79. At the time, he was a resident of Manhattan.
