= American Basketball League (1925–1955) =

First major professional basketball league in the United States

- Sport: Basketball
- Founded: 1925; 1933
- Folded: 1931; 1955
- No. of teams: around 95 (around 25 originally, around 70 later on)
- Country: United States
- Last champion: Manchester British-Americans
- Most titles: Cleveland Rosenblums (3; 1925–1931); Philadelphia Sphas (7; 1933–1953)

The American Basketball League (ABL) was an early professional basketball league. During six seasons from 1925–26 to 1930–31, the ABL was the first attempt to create a major, nationalized professional basketball league in the United States. It's revival that began two years later and technically ended by 1953 (which would be the last year the original rendition of the ABL would operate) sought to continue what the original league set to first create, albeit in a more regional manner instead of their originally planned national level.

== Original ABL History ==
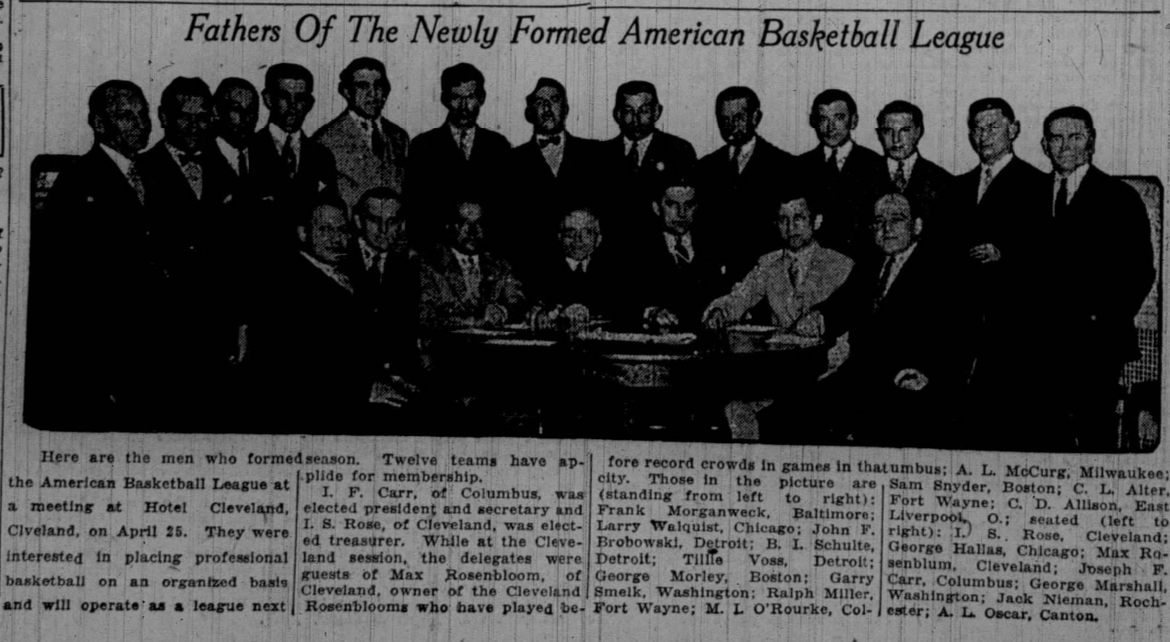
Founders of the ABL, 1925

Joseph Carr, who was in 1925 the president of then-new National Football League, organized the ABL from nine of the best independent pro teams from the East and the Midwest. George Halas of the NFL Chicago Bears was the owner of the Chicago Bruins, and department store magnate Max Rosenblum, a part owner of the NFL's Cleveland Bulldogs, financed the Cleveland Rosenblums. Future NFL (Washington Redskins) owner George Preston Marshall, the owner of a chain of laundries, was owner of the Washington Palace Five. Other teams were the Boston Whirlwinds, Brooklyn Arcadians, Buffalo Bisons, Detroit Pulaski Post Five, Fort Wayne Hoosiers, and Rochester Centrals. The New York Celtics were one of the top teams at the time, but declined to join the ABL, instead opting to remain an "at large" team at the time.

The league adopted a format with a split season that was divided into two halves, with the winner of the first half playing the winner of the second half for the championship (which was considered a "World Series" for the sport of basketball at the time). In addition to implementing the split season formatting, the ABL also adopted both the rules utilized by the Amateur Athletic Union (which included things like having their games be played under two 20-minute halves, eliminating the allowance of the two-handed double dribble, implementing the three-second lane violation, and being one of the first professional basketball leagues (if not the very first one in general) to utilize a backboard for professional basketball usage that's more commonly displayed for the sport to this day, with the ABL being the first league to make it mandatory) and became the first professional basketball league to both utilize exclusive professional basketball contracts (which were done to prevent players from jumping to various teams throughout a season, which plagued the sport's early professional history at the time) and to forbid gambling on games in general. The 1925–26 season saw Cleveland, the second half winner, defeat Brooklyn, winner of the first half of the season, three games to none. The Boston Whirlwinds, in conflict with the other owners over the status of the Celtics, refused to take part in the second half of the season and dropped out of the league.

Five games into the 1926–27 season, the Original Celtics (who had originally intended to compete in a rivaling league known as the "original" National Basketball League at the time) were fully admitted to replace the Brooklyn franchise, and won 32 of the remaining 37 games for the season before winning the league's championship.

For the 1927–28 season, the ABL had an Eastern (New York, Philadelphia, Rochester and Washington) and Western (Chicago, Cleveland, Detroit and Fort Wayne) division, with the two best teams in each division going to playoffs, and a championship between the playoff winners. Playing in Madison Square Garden, the Celtics finished with a 40–9 record in the regular season and won the championship. However, at season's end, the team was voted out of the league by the other owners. The ABL played three more seasons and then, with only five teams playing at the end of 1930–31, later folding during the Great Depression.

The league did take some measures to help modernize the game. One of the major issues that had plagued basketball was players jumping from team to team. To combat this, teams began signing players to contracts. Often these contracts went up to $1,500 per month, which was considerably more than what the average laborer was making at the time ($15 per week). New rules that were implemented included making backboards mandatory, adding a three-second lane violation, and implementing foul outs. The ABL also eliminated the double dribble, which was done to encourage many of the game's top college stars to play in the league.

One of the early stars for the league was Cleveland's Honey Russell whose 7.4 points was the second highest average in the league. Cleveland drew well, bringing in nearly 10,000 fans a game, while Brooklyn could only draw around 2,000.

=== 1925–26 season ===
Tipping off in November for 32 regular season games, the ABL's first season featured nine teams (A tenth team that was meant to play in East Liverpool, Ohio was originally intended to join the other nine teams as well, but that team ultimately withdrew its operations from the league before the season even started properly.), six of them in major cities that would have NBA teams a century later (Boston, Brooklyn, Chicago, Cleveland, Detroit and Washington) and the other three in Buffalo and Rochester, New York, and in Fort Wayne, Indiana. The opening game, played on November 15, 1925, took place at the Brooklyn Arcade, where the Washington Palace Five defeated the Brooklyn Arcadians, 32 to 30. The format of the season was to play two half seasons, with the winners of each half then playing in a championship. The Arcadians won the first half with a 12–4 record, and the Cleveland Rosenblums won the second half of the season, finishing 13–3. Cleveland swept the best 3-of-5 championship defeating Brooklyn 36–33, 37-21 and 23–22, taking the victory on April 9, 1926. The Boston Whirlwinds were expelled after the first half of the season on February 11, 1926.

=== 1926–27 season ===
The league knew they had a problem when it came to the Celtics. So the league opted to force the hands of the Celtics ownership. The teams in the league agreed prohibiting any games against the Celtics, and this left the Celtics with a dilemma. They could either join the American Basketball League, or they could try and schedule games against lesser competition, thus possibly losing out on drawing bigger crowds. In the end, ownership decided that it was worth the draw to join the ABL, so they did. The team won the league title by defeating Cleveland, which, despite still being a good team, was not the dominant force that had won the title the year before. Honey Russell, without a doubt the team's top star, got into a dispute with owner Max Rosenblum, thus leading to his contract being sold to Chicago. Cleveland also lost Vic Hanson, who had been one of the top college stars, but did not like the rough style of the pro level, and also did not care for the overall lack of playing time he was getting. The Celtics represented the borough of Brooklyn, which had been without a team after the Brooklyn Arcadians dropped out of the league. The Celtics assumed Brooklyn's 0–5 start. The league also lost the team in Detroit, which dropped out after a 0–6 start.

=== 1927–28 season ===
Once again, the ABL placed a team in Detroit, and once again it was a failure. Detroit was 5-13 when it opted to disband on January 3, 1927. The Washington franchise was shifted to Brooklyn on that same day. The Celtics this time represented the city of New York. Joe Lapchick, Nat Holman, Pete Berry, Dutch Dehnert and Davey Banks led the New York Celtics to a 40–9 record. The playoffs saw Fort Wayne defeat Cleveland 2 games to 0, and New York defeated Philadelphia 2 games to zero. New York defeated Fort Wayne 3 games to 1 in the championship series. The playoffs would be Philadelphia's last appearance in the league, as the team folded, becoming the third league team to revoke their presence.

=== 1928–29 season ===
During the 1927–28 season, the league divided the league into divisions, Eastern and Western. The 1928–29 season saw the format discarded. The Celtics were dominant, to the point that the league was suffering. The rally cry of "Break up the Celtics" was heeded. Players were dispersed to other teams, and this also resolved an issue for Celtics owner Jim Furey, who had issues with Madison Square Garden management. The arena's owners sought to evict the Celtics, who despite being a dominant team, never drew well at home. Cleveland, through purchase and trades, ended up with nearly all of the Celtics players on their roster. Cleveland ran away with the title, defeating Fort Wayne four games to none in the playoffs.

=== 1929–30 season ===
The New York Stock Exchange crashed on October 29, 1929. John J. O'Brien, the League's president, took the viewpoint that the "Great Depression" economic / financial slump would not last long, and the ABL continued business as usual. Former Celtics owner Jim Furey had just been released from prison, and put together a new version of the Celtics. However, the players were quickly becoming past their prime, and Nat Holman didn't play weekend games because he was a coach for the City College of New York. However, Cleveland still managed to win the league title, defeated Rochester and their star player, Tiny Hearn a six-foot, nine inch rookie star from Georgia Tech. However, there would never be a dynasty for Cleveland. The stock market crash took its toll on the ABL. During the 1930–31 season, Max Rosenblum shocked the world of basketball when he announced that his Cleveland team would cease operations. Rosenblum was unable to pay the contracts that his players had signed. George Halas at the end of the season, opted to fold his struggling Chicago Bruins club, and Toledo, which featured three former Celtics stars (Denhert, Lapchick, and Berry) shockingly finished in last place, with a record of four wins and eleven losses. Fort Wayne defeated Chicago, and lost to Brooklyn in the finals, as Brooklyn won what would ultimately be the league's last championship.

=== 1930–31 season ===
In what would become the final season of the original run for the first rendition of the American Basketball League, the ABL would allow for the Toledo Red Man Tobaccos (owned by the Red Man Tobacco Company (now known as America's Best Chew)) to join the league to make it return to seven teams by the start of the season, but the Great Depression's effects would continue to hamper the league's viability during this period of time. A new league rule mandating that each team can only carry two rookies at a time resulted in many familiar faces to the game being pushed out in the process, which later resulted in the Cleveland Rosenblums folding operations after twelve games played and the Paterson Crescents folding operations after eighteen games played in this season. With the ABL being driven down to five remaining clubs to play for the season, it was announced by commissioner John J. O'Brien that the financial difficulties driven by the Great Depression would result in the entire league being forced to suspend operations under a temporary basis by the season's finale, with him and any other teams involved with the league only waiting to return when a more financially stable means of operation would be viable for the ABL. In the meantime, the Brooklyn Visitations won the first half of the season with a 14–8 record, but the second half of the season had them struggling a lot with an 8–8 record, while the second half saw the Fort Wayne Hoosiers and Chicago Bruins get a tied record for the best results in the second half of the season with an 11–5 record in that timeframe. That resulted in them playing a tiebreaker game, which Fort Wayne won 20–16 on February 28, 1931, though it would be the Brooklyn Visitations that would win the final ABL championship in its original run with a 4–2 series win, excluding a 30-26 double-overtime loss they had in Game 4 on the road.

Initially, despite the low number of teams competing by the end of this season, the ABL would still look to have an ambitiously high 16 teams competing in the league for its planned 1931–32 season at the time, with 8 teams competing in the Eastern Division and 8 teams competing in what could be considered as the Midwestern (or Western) Division at the time. However, the ABL would never even come close to that ambitious amount of teams due to the continuing problems the Great Depression had caused upon the nation. While league president John J. O'Brien would fight valiantly for the ABL to have what would have been its 1931–32 season operate under its usual scope at hand, he ultimately decided to give up on the league's ambitions of being a truly national basketball league and have it stop operations by November 12, 1931. The ABL would essentially be in hibernation due to it suspending operations for two straight seasons following the long-term effects of the Great Depression (although former Philadelphia Warriors and current at the time Philadelphia Sphas team owner Eddie Gottlieb suggested the ABL was actually three or four years ahead of their time when they first folded operations instead, with at least one outlet suggesting the proper number of years ahead of their time was more closer to a couple of decades or so instead) before it ended up returning in 1933 under decreased visions of operating as a regional league within the Northeastern states.

== Revived ABL History ==
=== The Revival's Rise & Struggles (1933–1946) ===
After more than two years of suspended inaction, the league was reorganized in 1933, albeit as an East Coast league instead of the original goal of representing the United States of America as a whole, with teams primarily being stated to be in both the state of Pennsylvania and the general New York City metropolitan area. Not only that, but the ABL decided to modify their game rules a bit to have their games go into three 15-minute period intervals instead of two 20-minute long halves. The interesting rule change on the ABL's end would later result in a future rivaling league that they would compete against, the National Basketball League, experimenting with the idea of using the three 15-minute long period idea for a couple of games during their first season of existence. Not only that, but the rule change would also see some sports historians viewing the history of the revived ABL as one that's completely different from the original rendition of the ABL despite it having the same general staff and overall league history.

Despite not having much connectivity with the original rendition of the ABL, league president and commissioner John J. O'Brien would return to his role once again and create the new ABL off of the ashes from the failed brief revival of the Metropolitan Basketball League that he had tried to do following the original ABL's suspension (which included the return of the Brooklyn Visitations alongside a few of the best remaining teams there), as well as adding both the Trenton Moose and Philadelphia Sphas (the recent champions and runners-up from the revived iteration of the Eastern Basketball League) alongside the independently ran Newark Bears to have a solid eight teams to start its revival period. Not only that, but the ABL would continue utilizing the split season formatting that was used for most of its history throughout the majority of this period of time as well. It was during this period of time where the primarily Jewish operated Philadelphia Sphas (a team of Jewish origin, as noted with them also briefly playing as the Philadelphia Hebrews for a few seasons there as well) would hold what can potentially be considered the first dynasty in professional basketball's history with seven ABL championships won from its first season back in play in 1934 up until 1945, with Philadelphia continuing to genuinely compete for the league's championship up until 1947. Not only that, but up until 1946, the league's championship would also be won by the Brooklyn Visitations (the same team that won the original last championship won back in 1931), the Jersey Reds, the New York Jewels, the Wilmington (Blue) Bombers (once by default as the Wilmington Blue Bombers and once by upsetting the Sphas as the Wilmington Bombers), and the original Baltimore Bullets (who not only beat the Sphas in 1946 after falling to them in 1945, but also personally saw themselves as the champions of the ABL in 1947 over the actual champions that season, the Trenton Tigers, due to their overwhelming record that season in relation to the controversial manner that champion would be decided there). At times, the revived version of the ABL was seen as the premier league to hold the best professional talents for professional basketball in the nation, especially back when there wasn't much competition for the league to go up against.

Even with its successes at the time, the ABL would still see issues that would plague its revival as early as its second season back in existence due to it seeing constant team turnover on a season-by-season basis (even more so than the original rendition of the ABL). Not only that, but there would be a certain point where season formatting would become a bit more inconsistent as well, with the split season formatting being ditched for a proper regular season and playoff format at first before the playoff formatting would get replaced with a round-robin tournament for a single season before the ABL had a mixture of going around split season and regular season formats of play before eventually deciding to stick with the regular season formatting with a playoff format for good by the 1944–45 season. While some of its struggles during this time would relate to them operating while still being in the Great Depression, their biggest struggles during that period of time would primarily relate to the U.S.A. entering World War II, as not only would the ABL consider shutting down operations during the wartime period, but they would also struggle with travel restrictions and dealing with some of their players being called up for military action at the time as well, with the ABL also having to reach an agreement with the rivaling National Basketball League (and briefly with the minor Connecticut State Basketball League) to not peach each other's talents without giving back some sort of financial compensation in exchange. The majority of their time spent in the early 1940s would also see the ABL operating with as low as five or even four teams at times, though their post-World War II period did have them looking like they could see a bright future going forward when they not only had a stable six teams following that war's conclusion, but also looked to expand their operations for the 1946–47 season as well while also having a cooperative plan with the rivaling NBL and some of the smaller minor leagues of the time as well. However, when the Basketball Association of America (better known today as the National Basketball Association) was created during the same offseason period to compete against both the NBL and the ABL, it would help lead to the true decline and downfall of the revived version of the original ABL after it previously stayed solvent during the Great Depression and World War II.

=== The Revival's Fall (1946–1955) ===
While the 1946–47 season would not only see them be at their highest point with 10 competitive teams in the season, but also have their only other season where the league would utilize divisional play (albeit with the Northern Division and Southern Division instead of the more typical Eastern Division and Western Division) alongside the only season where the league would utilize an expanded playoff format in general, it would also be the same season where the players of the ABL would decide to vote on having their league operate more as a weekend league (where most of their games would be played on the weekend instead of all throughout the week like most other professional leagues would do) due to many of their players still having viable pay beyond the league itself. The short-term thinking at the time had the players feel like there was no guarantee that the BAA would end up surviving beyond a few seasons at most (which technically would be true when looking at the BAA name alone), with the steady work week allowing the players a chance to get a viable paycheck while still being able to compete in the weekends (outside of a scant few exhibition matches) since there was no guarantee that the BAA (or even the NBL) would allow players to quit their jobs to become full-time professional basketball players. However, with the ABL mostly operating in smaller cities by this time (outside of Philadelphia (which fielded teams in both the ABL and BAA due to Sphas team owner Eddie Gottlieb) and Baltimore, the most populated city outside of Trenton, New Jersey would arguably be in Wilmington, Delaware that season), the ABL had a hard time trying to recruit elite players into the smaller markets in their league, which helped diminish its popularity throughout the season even in Philadelphia, where the Sphas had long reigned supreme as a team there. It would also see its first controversy with the playoffs go down due to how long the semifinal round was and how the ABL decided to treat the 31–3 Baltimore Bullets' decision to compete in the 1947 World Professional Basketball Tournament while waiting for the semifinal round to conclude already. Despite the Bullets surprisingly losing in the first round of the WPBT that year and the semifinal round concluding after the 1947 event ended anyways (with the Trenton Tigers winning 2–1 over the Philadelphia Sphas), the ABL decided to disqualify the Bullets from the championship series and award the Trenton Tigers the league's championship by default. Not only would the Bullets later leave the ABL for the rivaling BAA (with them later winning the 1948 BAA Finals) following that decision (with Baltimore also claiming they were the true champions that season instead due to their overwhelming record held that season), but it would also begin the ABL's reputational decline from a major basketball league into something that felt more closer to a minor league by comparison, similar to that of the Eastern Pennsylvania (Professional) Basketball League.

From the 1947–48 season onward, the ABL would operate under a sense of stable instability in that they would always seem to get seven or eight teams on board to start out a season (mostly eight teams) and usually (though not always) get the playoffs completed properly, but there would always be teams that would go inactive and/or move around either during or after the season concluded in the process. Some of the most notable examples during that period of time (all of which being in the late 1940s) would include the EPBL's Lancaster Red Roses (who joined the Wilkes-Barre Barons from that same league) leaving the ABL after six games to return to the EPBL, the Jersey City Atoms moving from Jersey City to Union City, New Jersey for a brief moment before moving to Scranton, Pennsylvania to become the Scranton Miners, and the Philadelphia Sphas moving from Philadelphia to Atlantic City, New Jersey to become the Atlantic City Tides before moving back to Philadelphia as the Sphas for the rest of their final season of play in the ABL before ultimately leaving the league due to financial difficulties. Many of the teams that struggled and later left the ABL during this period of time would usually be those that had financial issues, with the two best teams throughout this particular period of time being the Wilkes-Barre Barons and Scranton Miners, who won most of the league's champions by this point in time (despite the former team threatening to leave the league multiple times due to management issues involving the ABL itself, with them actually doing so for a brief moment in time during the 1950–51 season, which led to the playoffs that season being cancelled entirely). However, that same period would also see the league be more open with breaking the color barrier by this point in time after previously being an all-white league for essentially all of its existence before the 1946–47 season concluded, as the Paterson Crescents would see their first African American player join the league with future NBA player Hank DeZonie playing on their team in the 1947–48 season. Not only that, but by the 1949–50 season, following the shoes of the Dayton Rens from the since-defunct National Basketball League following that league's merger with the BAA to create the NBA, the ABL would see their own all-black team break the color barrier and challenge the league's all-white teams through the New York Harlem Yankees (later renamed the Saratoga Harlem Yankees), who would actually be a playoff team during their existence.

The distinction of the ABL being a minor league alongside the EPBL would come from leagues like the NBL and BAA/NBA looking to send players in need of playing time to the teams that would want them, with the players only staying with them up until they would get called up by the larger teams from either the NBL or the BAA/NBA not long afterward. However, even their future where they would operate as nothing more than just as a minor league to the NBA would prove to be in jeopardy by the 1952–53 when two teams in the Elmira Colonels and the Jersey City Titans planned to use players that had been involved with the 1951 college basketball point-shaving scandal (with multiple players being involved in it for the Titans' case when compared to Elmira just having implicated center Bill Spivey be on their roster). The conflict would be big enough to where both Jersey City and Elmira would drop out of the league (at first in the case of Elmira) and almost cancel the season entirely before the Colonels came back in time to reschedule a new regular season schedule with seven teams instead. Despite them managing to get a new regular season out in time with only seven teams, they would still see multiple teams drop out of the league this season, including an unfortunate case in the final ABL Playoffs ever held in the semifinal round between the Manchester British-Americans and the Scranton Miners where Manchester noticed that Scranton had an extra player on the team that wasn't on their regular season roster for the second semifinal match, with the complaint eventually resulting in Scranton withdrawing from the best-of-seven semifinal round entirely. This would help later result in the Manchester British-Americans being named the final champions of the ABL when they swept the Wilkes-Barre Barons 2–0 (with rookie center Ray Felix later being selected as the #1 pick in the 1953 NBA draft by the Baltimore Bullets, ironically enough). However, after multiple issues that would be beyond the league's control (such as the Colonels' team owner dying from a heart attack and Wilkes-Barre's home venue selling off their bleachers to seat their fans, among other factors in mind), the ABL would decide to suspend their operations for what would have been its 1953–54 season before later disbanding itself from operations altogether by the time the 1954–55 season was planned to have begun.

== American Basketball League teams, 1925–26 to 1930–31 ==
- Boston Whirlwinds (1925–26, expelled after 1st half)
- Brooklyn Arcadians (1925–26 to 1926–27, replaced by New York Celtics after 5 games)
- Buffalo Bisons (1925–26; were the spiritual successors, if not direct continuation to the Naismith Basketball Hall of Fame Buffalo Germans team (hence mentions of them also being referred to as the Germans), might have later played in the Midwest Basketball Conference and National Basketball League in their history)
- Chicago Bruins (1925–26 to 1930–31; later competed in the National Basketball League)
- Cleveland Rosenblums (1925–26 to 1930–31, also known as the Rosies; named after team owner Max Rosenblum's department store of the same name)
- Detroit Lions (1925–26 to 1926–27, as Detroit Pulaski Post Five in 1925–26 and at beginning of 1926–27; dropped out after 6 games)
- Fort Wayne Hoosiers (1925–26 to 1930–31, as Fort Wayne Caseys in 1925–26 with their original team name after that season being the Fort Wayne Major Hoosiers instead; might have later competed in the short-lived National Professional Basketball League (a precursor to the National Basketball League) as the Fort Wayne Chiefs)
- Rochester Centrals (1925–26 to 1930–31, might have had connections with the Rochester Seagrams (now known as the Sacramento Kings of the NBA) an independent team
- Washington Palace Five (1925–26 to 1927–28, also known as the Laundrymen; dropped out in January 1928 and replaced by Brooklyn Visitations; named after team owner George Preston Marshall's Washington Palace Laundry business)
- Baltimore Orioles (1926–27)
- New York Celtics (1926–27 to 1927–28, 1929–30, 1937–38, also known as the Original Celtics; as Brooklyn Celtics in 1926–27; dropped out in December 1929)
- Philadelphia Warriors (1926–27 to 1927–28, also known as the Quakers; as Philadelphia Phillies in 1926–27)
- Brooklyn Visitations (1927–28 to 1930–31)
- Detroit Cardinals (1927–28, also known as the Olympians; dropped out in January 1928)
- New York Hakoahs (1928–29)
- Paterson Crescents (1928–29 to 1930–31, as Paterson Whirlwinds in 1928–29; dropped out in December 1930)
- Trenton Bengals (1928–29, also known as the Royal Bengals)
- Syracuse All-Americans (1930–31, dropped out in January 1931)
- Toledo Red Man Tobaccos (1930–31; named after the business of Red Man Tobacco, as it was named at the time, by Pinkerton Tobacco; later competed in the short-lived National Professional Basketball League (a precursor to the National Basketball League) as the Toledo Crimson Coaches Tobaccos)

== American Basketball League teams, 1933–34 to 1954–55 ==
- Bronx Americans (1933–34)
- Brooklyn Visitations (1933–34 to 1938–39, as Paterson Visitations in 1936–37; moved to Brooklyn in November 1936)
- Jersey Reds (1933–34 to 1939–40, as Union City Reds in 1933–34; merged into New York Jewels in January 1940)
- New Britain Mules (1933–34 to 1934–35, as Hoboken Thourots in 1933–34; moved to Camden in November 1933; as Camden Brewers in 1933–34; taken over and moved to New Britain in January 1934; as New Britain Palaces in 1933–34; as New Britain Jackaways in 1934–35; merged with Newark Mules to form the New Britain Mules for the 2nd half of 1934–35)
- New York Jewels (1933–34 to 1942–43, as Brooklyn Jewels in 1933–34; as New York Jewels in 1934–35 to 1936–37; renamed Brooklyn Jewels for 2nd half of 1936–37; as New Haven Jewels in 1937–38; moved to New York in November 1937 and renamed New York Jewels; absorbed Jersey Reds franchise in January 1940; dropped out in 1st half of 1941–42)
- Newark Mules (1933–34 to 1934–35, as Newark Bears in 1933–34; also known as Newark Joe Fays in 1933–34; merged with New Britain Jackaways for the 2nd half of 1934–35 to become the New Britain Mules)
- Philadelphia SPHAs (1933–34 to 1948–49, also alternatively known as the Hebrews from 1933 to 1937, briefly moved to Atlantic City, New Jersey to become the Atlantic City Tides for the 1948–49 season before returning to Philadelphia with their original Philadelphia Sphas on January 16, 1949; team was named in honor of the South Philadelphia Hebrew Association that they were previously affiliated with in their early history)
- Trenton Moose (1933–34)
- Boston Trojans (1934–35)
- Kingston Colonials (1935–36 to 1939–40, merged with Troy Celtics in December 1939)
- Passaic Red Devils (1935–36, also known as the Reds; as Paterson Panthers in 1935–36; moved to Trenton in December 1935; as Trenton Bengals in 1935–36; moved to Passaic for 2nd half of 1935–36)
- New York Yankees (1937–38, as Bronx Yankees in 1937–38; renamed New York Yankees during 1937–38; dropped out in January 1938)
- Troy Haymakers (1938–39; as Troy Celtics in 1939–40 to 1940–41 absorbed Kingston Colonials in December 1939; moved to Brooklyn during 1st half of 1940–41 to become Brooklyn Celtics)
- Washington Brewers (1938–39 to 1941–42, as Washington Heurichs in 1938–39, as Washington Heurich Brewers in 1939–40; originally named after the local Christian Heurich Brewing Company when originally using the Washington Heurichs and Washington Heurich Brewers team names)
- Wilkes-Barre Barons (1938–39 to 1939–40, dropped out in February 1940)
- Trenton Tigers (1941–42 to 1949–50; moved to Cohoes, New York to become the Cohoes Marras by January 7, 1950 (with their last game played as the Tigers being on December 28, 1949) before folding operations later in the season)
- Wilmington Blue Bombers (1941–42)
- Brooklyn Indians (1942–43 to 1943–44, as Camden Indians in 1942–43; moved to Brooklyn in January 1943; dropped out during 1st half of 1943–44)
- Harrisburg Senators (1942–43)
- New York Americans (1943–44)
- Wilmington Bombers (1943–44 to 1946–47)
- Baltimore Bullets (1944–45 to 1946–47, only ABL team to join the Basketball Association of America/National Basketball Association)
- Brooklyn Gothams (1944–45 to 1948–49, as Westchester Indians in 1944–45; moved to New York in January 1945; as New York Gothams in 1944–45 to 1945–46)
- Paterson Crescents (1944–45 to 1950–51, as Washington Capitols in 1944–45; moved to Paterson in January 1945)
- Hartford Hurricanes (1946–47 to 1949–50, as Elizabeth Braves in 1946–47 to 1947–48; moved to Hartford in December 1947)
- Scranton Miners (1946–47 to 1952–53, as Jersey City Atoms in 1946–47 to 1947–48; moved to Scranton in January 1948)
- Troy Celtics (1946–47)
- Yonkers Chiefs (1946–47, as Newark Bobcats in 1946–47; moved to Yonkers during 1946–47; dropped out during 1946–47 season)
- Lancaster Roses (1947–48, franchise terminated in December 1947)
- Wilkes-Barre Barons (1947–48 to 1952–53; previously competed in the Eastern Professional Basketball League and later returned to it (with it later being named the Eastern Basketball Association and the Continental Basketball Association following the ABL going defunct)
- Bridgeport Roesslers (1948–49 to 1951–52, as Bridgeport Newfield Steelers in 1948–49; as Bridgeport Aer-A-Sols in 1949–50)
- Glens Falls-Saratoga Harlem Yankees (1949–50 to 1952–53, as New York Harlem Yankees in 1949–50; as Saratoga Harlem Yankees 1950–51 to 1951–52; moved to Schenectady during 1951–52; as Schenectady Yankees in 1951–52; moved to Saratoga during 1951–52; as Saratoga Harlem Yankees in 1951–52; dropped out in February 1953)
- Schenectady Packers (1949–50, dropped out in November 1949)
- Carbondale Aces (1950–51)
- Utica Pros (1950–51)
- Washington Capitols (1951–52, technically the only National Basketball Association team to leave for the ABL despite the original NBA team folding operations on January 9, 1951; folded in January 1952 due to the NBA threatening to sue the new Capitols team and the ABL for using the Capitols team's name and history for that season)
- Elmira Colonels (1951–52 to 1952–53)
- Manchester British-Americans (1951–52 to 1952–53)
- Middletown Guards (1952–53)
- Pawtucket Slaters (1952–53)

In addition to them, there was also supposed to be another team meant to be added for the 1952–53 season in the Jersey City Titans that dropped out of the league days before that season was originally meant to begin properly due to their insistence on keeping players that were previously involved in the 1951 college basketball point-shaving scandal.

== League championships ==
Year	Winner	Result	Runner up
1925–26	Cleveland Rosenblums	3–0	Brooklyn Arcadians
1926–27	Brooklyn Celtics	3–0	Cleveland Rosenblums
1927–28	Original Celtics (2)	3–1	Fort Wayne Hoosiers
1928–29	Cleveland Rosenblums (2)	4–0	Fort Wayne Hoosiers
1929–30	Cleveland Rosenblums (3)	4–1	Rochester Centrals
1930–31	Brooklyn Visitations	4–2	Fort Wayne Hoosiers
1931–32	League suspended operations.		
1932–33	League suspended operations.		
1933–34	Philadelphia Sphas	4–2	Trenton Moose
1934–35	Brooklyn Visitations (2)	3–2	New York Jewels
1935–36	Philadelphia Sphas (2)	4–3	Brooklyn Visitations
1936–37	Philadelphia Sphas (3)	4–3	Jersey Reds
1937–38	Jersey Reds	4–2	New York Jewels
1938–39	New York Jewels	3–0	Jersey Reds
1939–40	Philadelphia Sphas (4)	Went undefeated (8–0) in five-team round-robin tournament.	
1940–41	Philadelphia Sphas (5)	3–1	Brooklyn Celtics
1941–42	Wilmington Blue Bombers	Won both halves to claim championship by default.	
1942–43	Philadelphia Sphas (6)	4–3	Trenton Tigers
1943–44	Wilmington Bombers (2)	4–3	Philadelphia Sphas
1944–45	Philadelphia Sphas (7)	2–1	Baltimore Bullets
1945–46	Baltimore Bullets	3–1	Philadelphia Sphas
1946–47	Trenton Tigers	Won forfeit; Baltimore Bullets could not play in the ABL Finals.	
1947–48	Wilkes-Barre Barons	2–1	Paterson Crescents
1948–49	Wilkes-Barre Barons (2)	3–2	Scranton Miners
1949–50	Scranton Miners	3–2	Bridgeport Aer-A-Sols
1950–51	Scranton Miners (2)	Playoffs were aborted this season.	
1951–52	Wilkes-Barre Barons (3)	4–2	Scranton Miners
1952–53	Manchester British-Americans	2–0	Wilkes-Barre Barons
1953–54	League suspended operations.		
1954–55	League disbanded.		

== Season scoring leaders ==
The American Basketball League's (ABL) scoring title was awarded to the player with the most total points in a given season.

*	Inducted into the Naismith Memorial Basketball Hall of Fame

Season	Player	Team	Total points	Games played	PPG	Field goals made	Free throws made
1925–26	Rusty Saunders	Brooklyn Arcadians, Washington Palace Five	238	34	7.0	73	92
1926–27	Rusty Saunders (2)	Washington Palace Five	399	42	9.5	119	161
1927–28	Harry Topel	Rochester Centrals	438	52	8.4	171	96
1928–29	Bennie Borgmann*	Fort Wayne Hoosiers	325	42	7.7	100	125
1929–30	Bennie Borgmann* (2)	Fort Wayne Hoosiers	416	50	8.3	149	118
1930–31	Bennie Borgmann* (3)	Paterson Crescents, Chicago Bruins	290	33	8.8	111	68
1933–34	Moe Spahn	Newark Bears, New Britain Palaces	333	38	8.7	92	149
1934–35	Carl Johnson	Brooklyn Visitations	310	43	7.2	115	116
1935–36	Bobby McDermott*	Brooklyn Visitations	382	40	9.6	157	68
1936–37	Phil Rabin	Kingston Colonials	488	37	13.2	187	144
1937–38	Phil Rabin (2)	Kingston Colonials	514	39	13.2	203	108
1938–39	Phil Rabin (3)	Jersey Reds	341	33	10.3	116	109
1939–40	Bobby McDermott* (2)	Baltimore Clippers	341	31	11.0	130	81
1940–41	Petey Rosenberg	Philadelphia Sphas	278	31	8.9	122	31
1941–42	Nat Frankel	Washington Brewers	188	20	9.4	59	70
1942–43	Steve Juenger	Harrisburg Senators	116	10	11.6	38	40
1943–44	Mike Bloom	Trenton Tigers	273	26	10.5	94	85
1944–45	Mike Bloom (2)	Trenton Tigers	321	30	10.7	118	85
1945–46	Art Hillhouse	Philadelphia Sphas	423	34	12.4	139	145
1946–47	Ash Resnick	Troy Celtics	563	35	16.1	191	181
1947–48	Cas Ostrowski	Wilkes-Barre Barons	561	31	18.1	214	133
1948–49	Dick Holub	Paterson Crescents	835	41	20.4	285	265
1949–50	Elmore Morgenthaler	Scranton Miners	728	37	19.7	267	194
1950–51	Johnny Ezersky	Wilkes-Barre Barons	718	39	18.4	242	234
1951–52	Joe Colone	Wilkes-Barre Barons	762	39	19.5	260	242
1952–53	Ray Felix	Manchester British-Americans	618	28	22.0	208	200
