= 1933–34 Brooklyn Visitations season =

- League: American Basketball League (revived original)
- Head coach: John Donlon
- General manager: John Donlon
- Owner(s): Unknown (John Donlon?)
- Arena: Grand Prospect Hall

Results
- Record: 13–20 (.394)
- Place: Conference: 4th (1st half); 8th (2nd half)
- Playoff finish: Did not qualify

The 1933–34 Brooklyn Visitations season was their thirteenth professional basketball season in Brooklyn, New York, as well as their first season in what would be the revived version of the American Basketball League (though if one were to include the original ABL seasons they played in with the revived version of the ABL, the Visitations would appear in five total seasons (four full total seasons) within the combined operations of the American Basketball League instead). After previously competing in the short-lived revival of the Metropolitan Basketball League for two straight seasons, the Visitations and MBL president John J. O'Brien would join up with the final MBL champion Brooklyn Jewels, the Bronx Americans, the Hoboken Thourots, and the Union City Reds alongside the Eastern Basketball League's champion Trenton Moose and Philadelphia Sphas (with the last team competing under the alternative Philadelphia Hebrews name at this time) and later the Newark Bears to create the revived, regional version of the American Basketball League that would essentially be connected to the original American Basketball League that the Visitations had previously played under for the last four seasons of that league's original existence there. While most of the rules in the revived ABL would remain the same as the original ABL held in its history (including utilizing the old split season formatting that was held throughout most of the ABL's existence in the first place), one key difference would see games be played under three 15 minute periods instead of two 20 minute halves in an attempt to provide better results for the games played in this iteration of the ABL. With all of this in mind, the Visitations would end up having an average first half of their first season back in the (revived) ABL, as they would have an average 12–12 record that would place them behind the Philadelphia SPHAs / Hebrews, the former Metropolitan Basketball League champion Brooklyn Jewels, and the former Eastern Basketball League champion Trenton Moose. However, their second half of their first season back in the ABL in its revived formatting would end up being a whole lot worse for the Visitations, as they would end up having only one total victory for that half of the season to finish dead last with a well below-average 1–8 record (being one game behind that of the Bronx Americans to tie them for seventh place instead), easily failing to qualify for the ABL's championship series for this season. Despite those late struggles to close out the season, the Visitations would continue to play in the ABL for another season not long afterward.

== Roster ==
Due to information on American Basketball League players being generally hard to find, there are bound to be more gaps and/or inaccuracies found in certain areas on the team's roster spots than usual.

1933–34 Brooklyn Visitations roster
Players

Pos.	No.	Player	Height	Weight	DOB	From
G/F		Tom Carroll	5 ft 4 in (1.63 m)	140 lb (64 kg)	1913-01-14	St. Francis College
F		Frank Conaty	6 ft 2 in (1.88 m)	164 lb (74 kg)	1909-12-30	No college
G/F		Rody Cooney	5 ft 8 in (1.73 m)	140 lb (64 kg)	1902-05-17	No college
F/C		Buster Dunne	6 ft 2 in (1.88 m)	180 lb (82 kg)	1908-01-12	No college
G/F		Bob Grody	6 ft 2 in (1.88 m)	215 lb (98 kg)	1900-04-25	Hamilton College
F/C		Jim Heath	6 ft 3 in (1.91 m)	210 lb (95 kg)	1912-09-10	No college
C		Pat Herlihy	6 ft 4 in (1.93 m)	220 lb (100 kg)	1909-02-28	No college
G		Bill Johnson	5 ft 9 in (1.75 m)	160 lb (73 kg)	1903-10-02	No college
G		Carl Johnson	5 ft 8 in (1.73 m)	150 lb (68 kg)	1909-10-19	William L. Dickinson HS (NJ)
F/C		Harry Knoblauch	6 ft 2 in (1.88 m)	190 lb (86 kg)	1898-04-21	No college
F/C		Frank Moore	6 ft 3 in (1.91 m)	190 lb (86 kg)	1909-08-16	Peirce College
G/F		Happy Reilly	5 ft 8 in (1.73 m)	165 lb (75 kg)	1907	No college
G		Willie Scrill	5 ft 10 in (1.78 m)	175 lb (79 kg)	1907-09-01	No college
C		Orville Terjesen	6 ft 4 in (1.93 m)	195 lb (88 kg)	1911-06-13	No college
G/F		Milt Trupin	5 ft 10 in (1.78 m)	160 lb (73 kg)	1909-09-05	CCNY

Coaches
Head coach

John Donlon

Legend
- (DP) Unsigned draft pick
- (FA) Free agent
- (S) Suspended
- Injured

== American Basketball League Standings ==
First Half
Team	Wins	Losses	Winning %
Trenton Moose	22	6	.786
Brooklyn Jewels	22	6	.786
Philadelphia SPHAs / Hebrews	15	12	.556
Brooklyn Visitations	12	12	.500
Bronx Americans	10	15	.400
Union City Reds	10	18	.357
Newark Bears	9	17	.346
Hoboken Thourots/Camden Brewers/New Britain Palaces^{[a]}	5	19	.208

Second Half
Team	Wins	Losses	Winning %
Philadelphia SPHAs / Hebrews	14	0	1.000
New Britain Palaces^{[a]}	7	5	.583
Brooklyn Jewels	4	4	.500
Trenton Moose	6	7	.462
Newark Bears	4	5	.444
Union City Reds	4	7	.364
Bronx Americans	2	6	.250
Brooklyn Visitations	1	8	.111

== Notes ==
^{a} Became the Camden Brewers after losing their first 4 games of the season by November 23, 1933, then became the New Britain Palaces by January 10, 1934 after Camden won only two out of their next eight games, with New Britain entering the first half of the season with a 2–12 record afterward.
