= 1932–33 Brooklyn Visitations season =

- League: Metropolitan Basketball League (revived original version)
- Head coach: John Donlon
- General manager: John Donlon
- Owner(s): Unknown (John Donlon?)
- Arena: Grand Prospect Hall

Results
- Record: 21–14 (.600)
- Place: Conference: 3rd (both halves)
- Playoff finish: Did not qualify

The 1932–33 Brooklyn Visitations season was their twelfth professional basketball season in Brooklyn, New York, as well as their second and final season in what would be the revived version of the Metropolitan Basketball League (though if one were to include the original MBL seasons with the revived version of the MBL, the Visitations would appear in nine total seasons within the combined operations of the Metropolitan Basketball League instead), with this season being an attempt for the Visitations to repeat as champions in the revived MBL (and win three straight professional basketball championships in the process). Unlike the previous season in the revived MBL where the teams competing had structure involved (despite it being more abbreviated in nature due to it being only 12 games long for its regular season), this full season of the revived Metropolitan Basketball League would be a lot more messy in terms of team structure by comparison when competing in the split season format once again as opposed to having a whole, proper regular season at hand, as by the start of the regular season, two of the revived MBL's original teams in the Brooklyn Jewish Center and the Jamaica St. Monicas (sometimes referred to as the Jamaica St. Monica Lyceums) ended up dropping out of the (revived) MBL, though they would attempt to look better as a league upon first glance by adding in a new fellow Brooklyn-based team in the Brooklyn Hillhouse (sometimes spelled as the Brooklyn Hill House), a new Jamaica-based team called the Corbett's Jamaicans (sometimes referred to as the Jamaica Corbetts), a new Yonkers, New York team in the Yonkers Knights, and a new Paterson, New Jersey team in the Paterson Continentals to have nine teams around to start the new season for a full, split regular season in the revived Metropolitan Basketball League. After only four games played to start out this season, the Brooklyn Hillhouse team dropped out of the league and were replaced by the Brooklyn Americans for the rest of the first half of the season. This later led to three more teams in the MBL dropping out of the league by the end of the first half of the season with the Corbett's Jamaicans (sometimes referred to as the Jamaica Corbetts), the Long Island Pros (who sometimes were referred to as the Long Island Imps, the Long Island Pro-Imps, or even the Long Island Imperials instead), and the Paterson Continentals all dropping out of the league after only the first half of that season concluded (leaving the revived MBL with only six teams competing for the second half of the season at the time), with the Metropolitan Basketball League forcing the creation of a new team in Jersey City with the Jersey City Palace Diamonds to help expand their league a bit once again into only seven teams for the second half of the season. However, despite the improvised way to help the league out for the second half of the season, even that half saw some issues occur when the Brooklyn Americans got replaced for the rest of the (second half of the) season by the Bronx-based Bronx St. Martins following a poor 2–7 start for the second half of the season. In any case, the Visitations' second (and final) season in the revived Metropolitan Basketball League wouldn't go so well when compared to how they performed in their first season there. While the Visitations were still one of the better teams in the league that season, they wouldn't perform well enough to live up to their championship-defending status this time around due to injuries and illnesses affecting the team alongside defections to the rivaling (yet smaller) revived (original?) version of the Eastern Basketball League, as their first half of the season would see them get an above-average 9–6 record for a third place finish behind only the Hoboken Lisas and the first half champion Brooklyn Jewels, while the second half of the season saw their record improve to a 12–8 finish, but it would still end up being a third place finish there behind the two teams that tied for first place in the second half of the season in the Brooklyn Jewels and the Union City Reds, which ultimately led to the Visitations failing to defend their championship this season. Following the conclusion of this season, the Visitations would join final MBL champion Brooklyn Jewels, the since-renamed Bronx Americans, the since-renamed Hoboken Thourots, and the Union City Reds under the supervision of MBL president John J. O'Brien (with other teams joining them including Eastern Basketball League contenders in the Trenton Moose and Philadelphia Sphas and later the independently ran Newark Bears) in order to create a revived version of the American Basketball League.

== Roster ==
Due to information on older professional basketball leagues being generally hard (if not outright impossible these days) to find for players from leagues like the revived Metropolitan Basketball League, there are bound to be more gaps and/or inaccuracies found in certain areas on the team's roster spots than usual.

1932–33 Brooklyn Visitations roster
Players

Pos.	No.	Player	Height	Weight	DOB	From
F		Frank Conaty	6 ft 2 in (1.88 m)	164 lb (74 kg)	1909-12-30	No college
G/F		Rody Cooney	5 ft 8 in (1.73 m)	140 lb (64 kg)	1902-05-17	No college
G/F		Joe Davidoff	5 ft 7 in (1.70 m)	140 lb (64 kg)	1910-03-06	CCNY
G/F		Bob Grody	6 ft 2 in (1.88 m)	215 lb (98 kg)	1900-04-25	Hamilton College
C		Tiny Hearn	6 ft 9 in (2.06 m)	230 lb (104 kg)	1905-06-03	Georgia Tech
G		Carl Johnson	5 ft 8 in (1.73 m)	150 lb (68 kg)	1909-10-19	William L. Dickinson HS (NJ)
F/C		Al Kellett	6 ft 3 in (1.91 m)	200 lb (91 kg)	1901-10-30	Columbia
G/F		Heine Mueller			Unknown	No college
G/F		Happy Reilly	5 ft 8 in (1.73 m)	165 lb (75 kg)	1907	No college
G/F		Rusty Saunders	6 ft 2 in (1.88 m)	210 lb (95 kg)	1906-03-12	Central HS (NJ)
G		Willie Scrill	5 ft 10 in (1.78 m)	175 lb (79 kg)	1907-09-01	No college
G/F		Moe Spahn	6 ft 0 in (1.83 m)	185 lb (84 kg)	1912-05-03	CCNY
G		Lou Spindell	5 ft 10 in (1.78 m)	175 lb (79 kg)	1908-12-16	CCNY
G/F		Milt Trupin	5 ft 10 in (1.78 m)	160 lb (73 kg)	1909-09-05	CCNY

Coaches
Head coach

John Donlon

Legend
- (DP) Unsigned draft pick
- (FA) Free agent
- (S) Suspended
- Injured

== Metropolitan Basketball League Standings ==
First Half
Team	Wins	Losses	Winning %
Brooklyn Jewels	13	3	.812
Hoboken Lisas	11	4	.733
Brooklyn Visitations	9	6	.600
Union City Reds	9	7	.562
Long Island Pros*	8	7	.533
Yonkers Knights	8	8	.500
Paterson Continentals*	3	9	.250
Corbett's Jamaicans*	3	11	.214
Brooklyn Hillhouse / Hill House / Americans**	3	12	.200

* – Dropped out of the league during the first half of the season.
** – The Brooklyn Hillhouse team (who sometimes might have been referred to as the Brooklyn Hill House instead) was replaced by the Brooklyn Americans team following the first four games played in the first half of the season. (Presumably, the Hillhouse team was 2–2 in terms of games played this season before leaving on December 30, 1932, while the Americans were 1–10 in the first half of the season.)

Second Half
Team	Wins	Losses	Winning %
Union City Reds	16	6	.727
Brooklyn Jewels	16	6	.727
Brooklyn Visitations	12	8	.600
Hoboken Lisas	12	9	.571
Brooklyn Americans / Bronx St. Martins**	7	13	.350
Yonkers Knights	4	16	.250
Jersey City Palace Diamonds***	1	10	.091

** – The Brooklyn Americans became the Bronx St. Martins on February 7, 1933 following a 2–7 start for the second half of the season.
*** – The Jersey CIty Palace Diamonds would join the MBL during the second half of the season only.
