= 1931–32 Brooklyn Visitations season =

- League champions
- Conference champions
- League: Metropolitan Basketball League (revived original version)
- Head coach: John Donlon
- General manager: John Donlon
- Owner(s): Unknown (John Donlon?)
- Arena: Grand Prospect Hall

Results
- Record: 10–2 (.833)
- Place: Conference: T–1st
- Playoff finish: MBL Champions (Won 2–1 over Brooklyn Jewels)

The 1931–32 Brooklyn Visitations season was their eleventh professional basketball season in Brooklyn, New York, as well as their first season in what would be the revived version of the Metropolitan Basketball League (though if one were to include the original MBL seasons with the revived version of the MBL, the Visitations would appear in eight total seasons within the combined operations of the Metropolitan Basketball League instead). Unlike the other seasons before or since this period of time, the Brooklyn Visitations would technically only exist as an independent team for the rest of 1931, if even that, before the Metropolitan Basketball League ended up being revived by future Naismith Basketball Hall of Famer John J. O'Brien on February 10, 1932 as a sort of abridged, abbreviated version of what a proper regular season for that league would have been due to the late start of reviving the league after John J. O'Brien previously delayed its revival due to him thinking he could have potentially had a 1931–32 season occur for the (original) American Basketball League back when O'Brien ended up being the president of the ABL instead of the MBL. As a result of this awkward, yet interesting kind of formatting on display here, the 1931–32 season for both the revived version of the Metropolitan Basketball League and the Brooklyn Visitations alike (alongside the other teams competing in the revived MBL during this particular season) could reasonably be seen as just them playing in the 1932 season only instead. In any case, the Visitations were one of seven teams competing in this revived (regional) professional basketball league (with the Visitations being the only holdover from the original ABL entering the revived MBL altogether), where in addition to the city of Brooklyn utilizing multiple new teams of their own in the Brooklyn Jewels and the Brooklyn Jewish Center, there would also be teams added in Jamaica, New York with the Jamaica St. Monicas (sometimes being referred to as the Jamaica St. Monica Lyceums instead), Long Island, New York with the Long Island Pros (who sometimes were referred to as the Long Island Imps, the Long Island Pro-Imps, or even the Long Island Imperials instead), Hoboken, New Jersey with the Hoboken Lisas, and Union City, New Jersey with the Union City Reds, where it would be presumed that the winner of the regular season would be the champions of the season by default if there wasn't a tiebreaker championship series to determine things otherwise. Luckily for the revived MBL, despite them only having twelve total games to play in this season due in part to the Great Depression (which would make this the shortest season in the franchise's history), both the Brooklyn Visitations and the Brooklyn Jewels would end up tying for first place due to them both having a 10–2 record to each be two games ahead of the second-best team there otherwise (the Union City Reds), which led to the revived Metropolitan Basketball League utilizing a best-of-three championship series between the two Brooklyn-based teams to determine who the new champion (and best Brooklyn team between the two of them) would be in this revived league. While it would ultimately be determined that the older Visitations team would technically get home court advantage for this series before it essentially went into two neutral home court territories that would technically favor the Visitations as the home court team instead, the MBL's championship series would see the Visitations get the inaugural (revived) MBL championship series to not only repeat as champions in different leagues (and win their fifth overall professional basketball championship), but also win what would be their final championship ever within the MBL's history (and the only one in the revived version's history for good measure) due to the Visitations winning their only home court game in Game 1 and then stealing away a close Game 3 from the newer Jewels franchise.

== Roster ==
Due to information on older professional basketball leagues being generally hard (if not outright impossible these days) to find for players from leagues like the revived Metropolitan Basketball League, there are bound to be more gaps and/or inaccuracies found in certain areas on the team's roster spots than usual.

1931–32 Brooklyn Visitations roster
Players

Pos.	No.	Player	Height	Weight	DOB	From
F		Frank Conaty	6 ft 2 in (1.88 m)	164 lb (74 kg)	1909-12-30	No college
G/F		Rody Cooney	5 ft 8 in (1.73 m)	140 lb (64 kg)	1902-05-17	No college
C		Pat Herlihy	6 ft 4 in (1.93 m)	220 lb (100 kg)	1909-02-28	No college
F/C		Al Kellett	6 ft 3 in (1.91 m)	200 lb (91 kg)	1901-10-30	Columbia
G/F		Heine Mueller			Unknown	No college
G/F		Bob O'Keefe			Unknown	No college
G/F		Happy Reilly	5 ft 8 in (1.73 m)	165 lb (75 kg)	1907	No college
G		Willie Scrill	5 ft 10 in (1.78 m)	175 lb (79 kg)	1907-09-01	No college

Coaches
Head coach

John Donlon

Legend
- (DP) Unsigned draft pick
- (FA) Free agent
- (S) Suspended
- Injured

== Metropolitan Basketball League Standings ==
Pos.	League Standings	Wins	Losses	Win %
T–1	Brooklyn Visitations	10	2	.833
T–1	Brooklyn Jewels	10	2	.833
3	Union City Reds	8	4	.667
4	Hoboken Lisas	6	6	.500
5	Brooklyn Jewish Center	4	8	.333
6	Long Island Pros	3	9	.250
7	Jamaica St. Monicas / Jamaica St. Monica Lyceum	1	11	.083

== Metropolitan Basketball League Championship Series ==
Due to the shortened regular season combined with both Brooklyn teams tying up their regular season records with each other within the MBL, this championship series could also be seen as a tiebreaker first place series as well.

(T–1) Brooklyn Visitations Vs. (T–1) Brooklyn Jewels: Visitations win series 2–1

- Game 1: April 15, 1932 @ Arcadia Hall (Jewels): Visitations 23, Jewels 16
- Game 2: April 17, 1932 @ Elks Ballroom (Visitations): Jewels 29, Visitations 19
- Game 3: April 25, 1932 @ Elks Club (Visitations): Visitations 28, Jewels 25
