= 1933–34 Philadelphia Sphas season =

American basketball team season

1933–34 Philadelphia Sphas / Hebrews season
- League champions
- League: American Basketball League (revived original)
- Head coach: Eddie Gottlieb
- General manager: Eddie Gottlieb
- Owner(s): Eddie Gottlieb
- Arena: Broadwood Hotel

Results
- Record: 29–12 (.707)
- Place: Conference: 3rd (1st half), 1st (2nd half)
- Playoff finish: ABL Champions (Won 4–2 over Trenton Moose)

The Philadelphia Sphas were an early, historical example of an American professional basketball team. The 1933–34 season was the very first season played in the now-revived American Basketball League by the Sphas, although they did play in the original rendition of the ABL from 1926 to 1928 as the Philadelphia Warriors, which had no relation to the later BAA franchise of the same name that now exists in the present day as the Golden State Warriors in the NBA. As such, when including the past history of the original ABL with the revived version of the ABL in 1933 following historical problems that related to the Great Depression near the end of 1931, this would technically be the seventh official season played by the original ABL properly, though this would officially be the 17th season of play for the Sphas franchise when including previous seasons where they played under names like the "Philadelphia YMHA"; the "Philadelphia Passon, Gottlieb, Black", the "Philadelphia Warriors"; and most recently, the "Philadelphia Hebrews".

== Background ==
The Sphas played in leagues around Philadelphia since 1917, but game-by-game records before the Sphas rejoined the ABL in 1933 are not (currently) available (at least, not to the general public if official game records did exist for the Sphas) and are therefore likely lost to time itself (though it's likely games involving the original Philadelphia Warriors in the original rendition of the ABL might be found for the general public to view someday). Starting with this season until their final season played in the revived version of the ABL, the Sphas would compete in a league where instead of two halves of 20 minutes or four quarters of around 10-12 (maybe going up to 15?) minutes played (excluding overtime matches), matches would be held under three 15-minute periods (excluding overtime matches) in a manner somewhat similar to what the National Hockey League would operate their league under.

After finishing the second half of the season with a perfect 14–0 record (which would unofficially add onto their previous 15–12 record in the first half of the season), the Sphas later won the revived ABL's first ever championship under its new revival with a 4–2 series victory over the Trenton Moose (who previously won the first place tiebreaker for the first half of the season over the Brooklyn Jewels). The Sphas' championship series victory over Trenton in the ABL would technically end up avenging the previous season's championship series loss to the Trenton Moose back when they both originally competed in the Eastern Basketball League during that prior season of play (with the Trenton Moose later folding operations following this season's conclusion). The Sphas were also referred to as the Philadelphia Hebrews in league records during this period of time, with the Hebrews name continuing to be utilized until 1937 due in part to the concerning rise of antisemitism within the U.S.A., if not certain parts of the world as well at the time.

== Roster ==
1933–34 Philadelphia Sphas / Hebrews roster
Players

Pos.	No.	Player	Height	Weight	DOB	From
F/C		Ed Beron	6 ft 2 in (1.88 m)	180 lb (82 kg)	1910–12–14	Temple
G/F		Gil Fitch	6 ft 0 in (1.83 m)	175 lb (79 kg)	1909–12–24	Temple
F/C		Lou Forman	6 ft 2 in (1.88 m)	160 lb (73 kg)	1906–08–05	Dickinson
F/C		Moe Goldman	6 ft 3 in (1.91 m)	175 lb (79 kg)	1913–05–30	CCNY
G/F		Shikey Gotthoffer	6 ft 0 in (1.83 m)	195 lb (88 kg)	1911–01–01	NYU
G		Cy Kaselman	5 ft 10 in (1.78 m)	165 lb (75 kg)	1909–05–01	Temple
F/C		Inky Lautman	6 ft 2 in (1.88 m)	205 lb (93 kg)	1914–05–22	Central HS (PA)
G		Harry Litwack	5 ft 7 in (1.70 m)	170 lb (77 kg)	1907–09–20	Temple
G		Red Wolfe	5 ft 11 in (1.80 m)	165 lb (75 kg)	1905–07–18	St. John's

Coaches
Head coach
- Eddie Gottlieb

Legend
- (DP) Unsigned draft pick
- (FA) Free agent
- (S) Suspended
- Injured

Note: The official championship series roster for the Philadelphia Sphas (alternatively known as the Philadelphia Hebrews during this period of time) would not include Ed Beron or Harry Litwack for this season.

== ABL Standings ==
First Half
Team	Wins	Losses	Winning %
Trenton Moose	22	6	.786
Brooklyn Jewels	22	6	.786
Philadelphia SPHAs / Hebrews	15	12	.556
Brooklyn Visitations	12	12	.500
Bronx Americans	10	15	.400
Union City Reds	10	18	.357
Newark Bears	9	17	.346
Hoboken Thourots/Camden Brewers/New Britain Palaces^{[a]}	5	19	.208

Second Half
Team	Wins	Losses	Winning %
Philadelphia SPHAs / Hebrews	14	0	1.000
New Britain Palaces^{[a]}	7	5	.583
Brooklyn Jewels	4	4	.500
Trenton Moose	6	7	.462
Newark Bears	4	5	.444
Union City Reds	4	7	.364
Bronx Americans	2	6	.250
Brooklyn Visitations	1	8	.111

== ABL Schedule ==
First Half
#	Date	Opponent	Score	Record
1A	November 18	Hoboken Thourots^{[a]}	34–20	1–0
2A	November 25	Union City Reds	38–41	1–1
3A	November 26	@ Bronx Americans	34–23	2–1
4A	December 2	Brooklyn Jewels	26–36	2–2
5A	December 3	@ Brooklyn Visitations	30–15	3–2
6A	December 9	Trenton Moose	22–28	3–3
7A	December 10 (Game 1)	@ Union City Reds	36–33	4–3
8A	December 10 (Game 2)	@ Brooklyn Jewels	25–27	4–4
9A	December 16	Brooklyn Visitations	31–26	5–4
10A	December 19	@ Newark Bears	29–34	5–5
11A	December 23	Newark Bears	38–29	6–5
12A	December 25	@ Trenton Moose	32–38	6–6
13A	December 30	Bronx Americans	42–21	7–6
14A	December 31	@ Camden Brewers^{[a]}	42–32	8–6
15A	January 6	Camden Brewers^{[a]}	26–22	9–6
16A	January 7	@ Brooklyn Jewels	34–20	10–6
17A	January 13	Union City Reds	50–43	11–6
18A	January 14	@ Brooklyn Visitations	21–26	11–7
19A	January 20	Newark Bears	40–28	12–7
20A	January 21	@ Union City Reds	30–33	12–8
21A	January 27	Trenton Moose	36–25	13–8
22A	January 28	@ Bronx Americans	30–31	13–9
23A	February 3	Brooklyn Visitations	30–28	14–9
24A	February 10	Brooklyn Jewels	23–29	14–10
25A	February 17	Bronx Americans	45–41	15–10
26A	February 18	@ Newark Bears	31–49	15–11
27A	February 19	@ Trenton Moose	26–36	15–12

Second Half
#	Date	Opponent	Score	Record
1B	February 24	Newark Bears	49–42	1–0
2B	March 3	Bronx Americans	69–35	2–0
3B	March 4	@ Brooklyn Jewels	30–24	3–0
4B	March 10	Brooklyn Visitations	41–36	4–0
5B	March 11	@ Newark Bears	38–26	5–0
6B	March 17	Trenton Moose	39–33	6–0
7B	March 18	@ Brooklyn Visitations	21–17	7–0
8B	March 20	New Britain Palaces^{[a]}	39–25	8–0
9B	March 23	@ Trenton Moose	38–35	9–0
10B	March 24	Union City Reds	47–38	10–0
11B	March 25	@ Bronx Americans	40–24	11–0
12B	March 31	Brooklyn Jewels	42–19	12–0
13B	April 1	@ Union City Reds	48–41	13–0
14B	April 4	@ New Britain Palaces^{[a]}	27–25	14–0

ABL Championship Series
Game	Date	Opponent	Score	Record
Game 1	April 6	@ Trenton Moose	28–21	1–0
Game 2	April 7	Trenton Moose	21–35	1–1
Game 3	April 13	@ Trenton Moose	32–20	2–1
Game 4	April 14	Trenton Moose	29–32	2–2
Game 5	April 15	N Trenton Moose^{[b]}	32–22	3–2
Game 6	April 21	Trenton Moose	40–34	4–2

== Notes ==
^{a} The Hoboken Thourots became the Camden Brewers after losing their first 4 games of the season by November 23, 1933, then became the New Britain Palaces by January 10, 1934 after Camden won only two out of their next eight games, with New Britain entering the first half of the season with a 2–12 record afterward.
^{b} Game was played in Brooklyn.
