= 1933–34 Bronx Americans season =

American basketball team season

- League: American Basketball League (revived original)
- Head coach: Frank Lombardo
- General manager: Frank Lombardo(?)
- Owner(s): Frank Lombardo(?); Martin L. Cohen(?); Phillip Fox & Associates(?)
- Arena: Holy Family Auditorium

Results
- Record: 12–21 (.364)
- Place: Conference: 5th (1st half): 7th (2nd half)
- Playoff finish: Did not qualify

The 1933–34 Bronx Americans season was the second professional basketball season played by the Americans franchise, as well as their first and only full season played in The Bronx area of New York after they previously completed their first professional season as the Brooklyn Hillhouse (sometimes spelled as the Brooklyn Hill House), the Brooklyn Americans in the nearby city of Brooklyn, and the Bronx St. Martins (sometimes spelled as the Bronx St. Martin's) in what would become the first season played in the revived version of the original American Basketball League. The Americans (who sometimes were still referred to as the St. Martins or St. Martin's during this season of play in the ABL) were joined alongside five other former teams from the revived MBL, two of the best teams of the revived EBL in the Philadelphia Sphas and Trenton Moose, and the independently ran Newark Bears to have an eight team league at hand for a revived American Basketball League where most of the structure would be the same as its original counterpart from 1925 to 1931, though there would be subtle differences in terms of results like having three 15 minute periods instead of two 20 minute halves and being more akin to a regional league instead of a truly national league like the ABL first was envisioned as at the time. In any event, similar to the team's only season in the revived version of the Metropolitan Basketball League, the Americans would end up struggling as a franchise throughout the entire season. For the first half of the season, the Bronx Americans would get a below-average 10–15 record, though they would finish that half of the season in fifth place ahead of only the Union City Reds, the Newark Bears, and the Hoboken Thourots turned Camden Brewers turned New Britain Palaces. However, the second half of the season would see the Americans perform a lot more poorly by comparison, as they'd finish that half of the season with an even worse 2–6 record for a 7th place finish that only put them ahead of the Brooklyn Visitations this time around. Following this season's conclusion, the Bronx Americans would end up leaving the ABL, with the team supposedly not returning to the league again until the 1943–44 season while competing under the New York Americans name instead.

== Roster ==
Due to information on American Basketball League players being generally hard to find, there are bound to be more gaps and/or inaccuracies found in certain areas on the team's roster spots than usual.

Player	Position(s)
Mike Arrasate	G/F
Fred Brunelli	G/F
Dave Budnetz	G/F
Moe Frankel	G/F
Sonny Gluck	G/F
Tom Hutchinson	G/F
Al Kellett	F/C
Willie McDonald	G/F
Mike Michelotti	G/F
Johnny Spellacy	C
Frank Stanzi	F
Bob Synnott	F

== American Basketball League Standings ==
First Half
Team	Wins	Losses	Winning %
Trenton Moose	22	6	.786
Brooklyn Jewels	22	6	.786
Philadelphia SPHAs / Hebrews	15	12	.556
Brooklyn Visitations	12	12	.500
Bronx Americans	10	15	.400
Union City Reds	10	18	.357
Newark Bears	9	17	.346
Hoboken Thourots/Camden Brewers/New Britain Palaces^{[a]}	5	19	.208

Second Half
Team	Wins	Losses	Winning %
Philadelphia SPHAs / Hebrews	14	0	1.000
New Britain Palaces^{[a]}	7	5	.583
Brooklyn Jewels	4	4	.500
Trenton Moose	6	7	.462
Newark Bears	4	5	.444
Union City Reds	4	7	.364
Bronx Americans	2	6	.250
Brooklyn Visitations	1	8	.111

== Notes ==
^{a} Became the Camden Brewers after losing their first 4 games of the season by November 23, 1933, then became the New Britain Palaces by January 10, 1934, after Camden won only two out of their next eight games, with New Britain entering the first half of the season with a 2–12 record afterward.
