= 1933–34 Union City Reds season =

- League: American Basketball League (revived original)
- Head coach: Muggsy Miller
- General manager: Muggsy Miller(?)
- Owner(s): Muggsy Miller(?)
- Arena: Floral Park

Results
- Record: 14–25 (.359)
- Place: Conference: 6th (both halves)
- Playoff finish: Did not qualify

The 1933–34 Union City Reds season was the third professional basketball season played by the Union City Reds franchise, as well as their final season played in Union City, New Jersey before moving to nearby North Bergen, New Jersey and their first season played in the revived version of the original American Basketball League. After completing their first two seasons as one of the best teams in the Metropolitan Basketball League, the Reds would end up being one of five former Metropolitan Basketball League teams to leave that league for a revived version of the original American Basketball teams. While most of the rules in the revived ABL would remain the same as what the original ABL held in its history (including utilizing the old split season formatting that was held throughout most of the ABL's existence in the first place), one key difference would see games be played under three 15 minute periods instead of two 20 minute halves in an attempt to provide better results for the games played in this iteration of the ABL. Unfortunately for Union City, once they went from the MBL to the ABL, the Reds would end up becoming one of the worst teams in the ABL when the transition commenced, as they would end up having a poor overall record throughout the season. For the first half of the season, Union City would get a below-average 10–18 record that put them ahead of only the Newark Bears and the Hoboken Thourots turned Camden Brewers turned New Britain Palaces for a sixth place finish. As for the second half of the season, the Reds got an even worse 4–7 record that put them ahead of only the Bronx Americans and the Brooklyn Visitations for another sixth place finish, which gave them an overall finish of 14–25 for the season. Following the season's conclusion, financial issues would have the team move from Union City to nearby North Bergen to rebrand themselves as the Jersey Reds for the rest of their existence going forward.

== Roster ==
Due to information on American Basketball League players being generally hard to find, there are bound to be more gaps and/or inaccuracies found in certain areas on the team's roster spots than usual.

1933–34 Union City Reds roster
Players

Pos.	No.	Player	Height	Weight	DOB	From
G		Paulie Adamo	5 ft 11 in (1.80 m)	165 lb (75 kg)	1907-01-11	Panzer College
F		Lou Bender	6 ft 1 in (1.85 m)	175 lb (79 kg)	1910-03-08	Columbia
C		Howie Bollerman	6 ft 8 in (2.03 m)	200 lb (91 kg)	1907-06-09	Colgate
G/F		Tony Calland	5 ft 7 in (1.70 m)	155 lb (70 kg)	1902-09-02	No college
G		Rip Collins	6 ft 1 in (1.85 m)	185 lb (84 kg)	1907	St. John's
F/C		Gaza Chizmadia	6 ft 2 in (1.88 m)	185 lb (84 kg)	1906-01-12	No college
G/F		Freddie Gerken	5 ft 9 in (1.75 m)	150 lb (68 kg)	1911-11-01	No college
G/F		Buddy Hassett	5 ft 11 in (1.80 m)	175 lb (79 kg)	1911-09-05	Manhattan
G		Jimmy Kent	5 ft 11 in (1.80 m)	185 lb (84 kg)	1906-02-08	No college
F/C		Bob Synnott	6 ft 3 in (1.91 m)	190 lb (86 kg)	1912-09-27	Theodore Roosevelt HS (NY)

Coaches
Head coach

Muggsy Miller

Legend
- (DP) Unsigned draft pick
- (FA) Free agent
- (S) Suspended
- Injured

== American Basketball League Standings ==
First Half
Team	Wins	Losses	Winning %
Trenton Moose	22	6	.786
Brooklyn Jewels	22	6	.786
Philadelphia SPHAs / Hebrews	15	12	.556
Brooklyn Visitations	12	12	.500
Bronx Americans	10	15	.400
Union City Reds	10	18	.357
Newark Bears	9	17	.346
Hoboken Thourots/Camden Brewers/New Britain Palaces^{[a]}	5	19	.208

Second Half
Team	Wins	Losses	Winning %
Philadelphia SPHAs / Hebrews	14	0	1.000
New Britain Palaces^{[a]}	7	5	.583
Brooklyn Jewels	4	4	.500
Trenton Moose	6	7	.462
Newark Bears	4	5	.444
Union City Reds	4	7	.364
Bronx Americans	2	6	.250
Brooklyn Visitations	1	8	.111

== Notes ==
^{a} Became the Camden Brewers after losing their first 4 games of the season by November 23, 1933, then became the New Britain Palaces by January 10, 1934, after Camden won only two out of their next eight games, with New Britain entering the first half of the season with a 2–12 record afterward.
