= 1933–34 Trenton Moose season =

- League: American Basketball League (revived original)
- Head coach: Teddy Kearns
- General manager: Teddy Kearns
- Arena: Moose Hall; Trenton Arena

Results
- Record: 28–13 (.683)
- Place: Conference: T–1st (1st half); 4th (2nd half)
- Playoff finish: Lost ABL championship 4-2 to the Philadelphia SPHAs / Hebrews

The 1933–34 Trenton Moose season was presumably the 27th professional basketball season played by the Trenton Moose (and presumably their second and final professional season under the Moose name properly after previously using the Nationals, Trentons, Potters, Tigers, and (Royal) Bengals team names alongside the merged season in the failed "original" National Basketball League as the Greenpoint Knights of St. Anthony/Trenton Royal Bengals) of the revived original version of the American Basketball League. When the American Basketball League was revived in 1933 by Naismith Basketball Hall of Famer John J. O'Brien after he previously was managing the revived version of the Metropolitan Basketball League, O'Brien would give out invites to the two best teams of the revived Eastern Basketball League in the defending EBL champion Trenton Moose and the three-time former EBL champion Philadelphia Sphas alongside the independently ran Newark Bears team to go up against five of the remaining teams from the (failed) revived attempt at the Metropolitan Basketball League (which were the defending MBL champion Brooklyn Jewels, the former original ABL team known as the Brooklyn Visitations, the Bronx Americans (formerly known as the Bronx St. Martin's), the Hoboken Thourots (formerly known as the Hoboken Lisas), and the Union City Reds) to create the new eight team ABL that would essentially be the same version of the original ABL from the late 1920s and early 1930s, but with a few differences in terms of rules and scope in mind for this iteration of the ABL. During the first half of the season, the former EBL champion Moose would be tied with the former MBL champion Brooklyn Jewels to finish their first halves of the season with a 22–6, which led to them competing in a best-of-three tiebreaker series that resulted in Trenton sweeping the Jewels. However, due in part to them winning the first half of the season, the Moose would end up performing in a below-average manner for the second half of the season to get a poorer 6–7 record for a fourth place finish that put them behind Brooklyn, the recently rebranded New Britain Palaces, and the Philadelphia SPHAs / Hebrews. This led to the ABL's first championship series since 1931 being a rematch of the 1933 EBL championship series, though it would be Philadelphia that would win this series with a 4–2 series win, with the Trenton Moose leaving the ABL soon afterward due to financial issues despite their early success (though it wouldn't be the last ABL season for the capital city of Trenton, New Jersey in general).

== Roster ==
Due to information on American Basketball League players being generally hard to find, there are bound to be more gaps and/or inaccuracies found in certain areas on the team's roster spots than usual.

1933–34 Trenton Moose roster
Players

| Pos. | No. | Player | Height | Weight | DOB | From |
|---|---|---|---|---|---|---|
| G/F | | George Glasco | 5 ft 10 in (1.78 m) | 150 lb (68 kg) | 1901-04-07 | No college |
| G/F | | Bob Grody | 6 ft 2 in (1.88 m) | 215 lb (98 kg) | 1900-04-25 | Hamilton College |
| C | | Tiny Hearn | 6 ft 9 in (2.06 m) | 230 lb (104 kg) | 1905-06-03 | Georgia Tech |
| G/F | | Obie O'Brien | 5 ft 6 in (1.68 m) | 120 lb (54 kg) | 1909-01-05 | Temple |
| G/F | | Honey Russell | 6 ft 0 in (1.83 m) | 180 lb (82 kg) | 1902-05-31 | Alexander Hamilton HS (NY) |
| G/F | | Rusty Saunders | 6 ft 2 in (1.88 m) | 210 lb (95 kg) | 1906-03-12 | Central HS (NJ) |
| G/F | | Dutch Shudtz | 6 ft 0 in (1.83 m) | 175 lb (79 kg) | 1908-06-07 | No college |
| G/F | | Lou Spindell | 5 ft 10 in (1.78 m) | 175 lb (79 kg) | 1908-12-16 | CCNY |

Coaches
Head coach

Teddy Kearns

Legend
- (DP) Unsigned draft pick
- (FA) Free agent
- (S) Suspended
- Injured

Note: Obie O'Brien would not be a part of this team's playoff roster for whatever reason on his end.

== American Basketball League Standings ==
First Half
| Team | Wins | Losses | Winning % |
|---|---|---|---|
| Trenton Moose | 22 | 6 | .786 |
| Brooklyn Jewels | 22 | 6 | .786 |
| Philadelphia SPHAs / Hebrews | 15 | 12 | .556 |
| Brooklyn Visitations | 12 | 12 | .500 |
| Bronx Americans | 10 | 15 | .400 |
| Union City Reds | 10 | 18 | .357 |
| Newark Bears | 9 | 17 | .346 |
| Hoboken Thourots/Camden Brewers/New Britain Palaces^{[a]} | 5 | 19 | .208 |

Second Half
| Team | Wins | Losses | Winning % |
|---|---|---|---|
| Philadelphia SPHAs / Hebrews | 14 | 0 | 1.000 |
| New Britain Palaces^{[a]} | 7 | 5 | .583 |
| Brooklyn Jewels | 4 | 4 | .500 |
| Trenton Moose | 6 | 7 | .462 |
| Newark Bears | 4 | 5 | .444 |
| Union City Reds | 4 | 7 | .364 |
| Bronx Americans | 2 | 6 | .250 |
| Brooklyn Visitations | 1 | 8 | .111 |

== American Basketball League Playoffs ==
Technically, this season would be a season similar to the final season of the original rendition of the ABL due to the first half of the season having a tie occur due to the Trenton Moose and the Brooklyn Jewels being tied for the first half of the season. However, the second half of the season wouldn't have a tiebreaker occur due to the Philadelphia Sphas / Hebrews going undefeated for that half of the season, meaning that half of the season wouldn't need a tiebreaker by default.

=== American Basketball League First Half Tiebreaker Series ===
Interestingly, the tiebreaker series of the first half of the season would happen during the second half of the season.

ABL First Half Tiebreaker Series
| Game | Date | Opponent | Score | Record |
|---|---|---|---|---|
| Game 1 | March 6 | Brooklyn Jewels | 44–23 | 1–0 |
| Game 2 | March 9 | @ Brooklyn Jewels | 21–14 | 2–0 |

Due to the Moose winning the first half of the season, they would automatically qualify for the championship series that the ABL was hosting this time around.

=== American Basketball League Championship Series ===
ABL Championship Series
| Game | Date | Opponent | Score | Record |
|---|---|---|---|---|
| Game 1 | April 6 | Philadelphia SPHAs / Hebrews | 21–28 | 0–1 |
| Game 2 | April 7 | @ Philadelphia SPHAs / Hebrews | 35–21 | 1–1 |
| Game 3 | April 13 | Philadelphia SPHAs / Hebrews | 20–32 | 1–2 |
| Game 4 | April 14 | @ Philadelphia SPHAs / Hebrews | 32–29 | 2–2 |
| Game 5 | April 15 | N Philadelphia SPHAs / Hebrews^{[b]} | 22–32 | 2–3 |
| Game 6 | April 21 | @ Philadelphia SPHAs / Hebrews | 34–40 | 2–4 |

== Notes ==
^{a} The Hoboken Thourots became the Camden Brewers after losing their first 4 games of the season by November 23, 1933, then became the New Britain Palaces by January 10, 1934, after Camden won only two out of their next eight games, with New Britain entering the first half of the season with a 2–12 record afterward.
^{b} Game was played in Brooklyn.
