= 1932–33 Union City Reds season =

- League: Metropolitan Basketball League (revived original version)
- Head coach: Muggsy Miller
- General manager: Muggsy Miller(?)
- Owner(s): Muggsy Miller(?)
- Arena: Elks Clubhouse; Columbia Park

Results
- Record: 10–2 (.833)
- Place: Conference: 4th (1st half); T–1st (2nd half)
- Playoff finish: Lost MBL championship 2–1 to the Brooklyn Jewels.

The 1932–33 Union City Reds season was the second professional basketball season played by the Union City Reds franchise. It would also end up becoming their final season played in the (revived version of the) Metropolitan Basketball League, as the revived version of the MBL would end up shutting down operations following the season's conclusion. Throughout this season, the Reds would become one of the strongest teams of the entire league, though not quite the strongest team there. In the first half of the season, Union City would get an above-average 9–7 record for a fourth place finish, placing them behind only the defending MBL champion Brooklyn Visitations (by a half-game), the Hoboken Lisas, and the Brooklyn Jewels. However, the second half of the season would have the Reds kick things up a notch on their ends, as they'd finish that half of the season with a 16–6 record to tie for first place with the aforementioned Brooklyn Jewels, which warranted a second half tiebreaker match between the two teams to determine the winner for that half of the season. Fortunately for Union City, they not only would get home court advantage for that match, but also would end up winning a 32–28 double-overtime thriller (for its time, at least), which led to the MBL holding a best-of-three championship series for the overall winner of the season instead of having the Brooklyn Jewels win the season outright. Unfortunately for the Reds, the Brooklyn Jewels would not only end up getting home court advantage throughout the series, but they'd also end up sweeping the Union City Reds in the championship series rematch to have the Jewels win what would later become the final championship series ever held by the MBL in its entire history. Following this season's conclusion, the Union City Reds alongside the team they just lost to in the MBL championship series in the Brooklyn Jewels, their cityside rivals in the former ABL team known as the Brooklyn Visitations, the Hoboken Lisas (who would rebrand themselves as the Hoboken Thourots not long afterward), and the Bronx St. Martins (who would become the Bronx Americans not long afterward) would end up joining the two best teams of the Eastern Basketball League in the Philadelphia Sphas and the new EBL champion Trenton Moose and the independently ran Newark Bears to recreate the original American Basketball League in a revived, yet more regional point of view under the discretion of John J. O'Brien, the MBL's creator and commissioner.

== Roster ==
Due to information on older professional basketball leagues being generally hard (if not outright impossible these days) to find for players from leagues like the revived Metropolitan Basketball League, there are bound to be more gaps and/or inaccuracies found in certain areas on the team's roster spots than usual.

1932–33 Union City Reds roster
Players

Pos.	No.	Player	Height	Weight	DOB	From
F		Lou Bender	6 ft 1 in (1.85 m)	175 lb (79 kg)	1910-03-08	Columbia
C		Howie Bollerman	6 ft 8 in (2.03 m)	200 lb (91 kg)	1907-06-09	Colgate
G/F		Tony Calland	5 ft 7 in (1.70 m)	155 lb (70 kg)	1902-09-02	No college
G		Rip Collins	6 ft 1 in (1.85 m)	185 lb (84 kg)	1907	St. John's
F/C		Gaza Chizmadia	6 ft 2 in (1.88 m)	185 lb (84 kg)	1906-01-12	No college
C		Bill Denzer	6 ft 5 in (1.96 m)	170 lb (77 kg)	1911-06-12	Savage School for Physical Education
G/F		Freddie Gerken	5 ft 9 in (1.75 m)	150 lb (68 kg)	1911-11-01	No college
G/F		George Glasco	5 ft 10 in (1.78 m)	150 lb (68 kg)	1901-04-07	No college
G/F		Jim Needles	5 ft 11 in (1.80 m)	170 lb (77 kg)	1908-01-27	No college
G/F		Wally Palmer			1909-10-24	No college
G		Hickky Rohlich	5 ft 10 in (1.78 m)	175 lb (79 kg)	1908-10-10	No college
F		Al Strauch	6 ft 0 in (1.83 m)	180 lb (82 kg)	1913-06-26	No college

Coaches
Head coach

Muggsy Miller

Legend
- (DP) Unsigned draft pick
- (FA) Free agent
- (S) Suspended
- Injured

Note: Hickky Rohlich would only compete in one championship series match for the Reds. That means outside of one championship series match, the team's roster for that particular series (as well as the tiebreaker match that the Reds won, potentially speaking) would primarily consist of Howie Bollerman, Tony Calland, Gaza Chizmadia, Freddie Gerkin, and George Glasco as their main roster at hand there.

== Metropolitan Basketball League Standings ==
First Half
Team	Wins	Losses	Winning %
Brooklyn Jewels	13	3	.812
Hoboken Lisas	11	4	.733
Brooklyn Visitations	9	6	.600
Union City Reds	9	7	.562
Long Island Pros*	8	7	.533
Yonkers Knights	8	8	.500
Paterson Continentals*	3	9	.250
Corbett's Jamaicans*	3	11	.214
Brooklyn Hillhouse / Hill House / Americans**	3	12	.200

* – Dropped out of the league during the first half of the season, with both the Paterson Continentals and the Corbett's Jamaicans being known to exit the MBL on December 30, 1932, while the Long Island Pros ended up exiting near the end of the first half of the season.
** – The Brooklyn Hillhouse team (who sometimes might have been referred to as the Brooklyn Hill House instead) was replaced by the Brooklyn Americans team following the first four games played in the first half of the season. (Presumably, the Hillhouse team was 2–2 in terms of games played this season before leaving on December 30, 1932, while the Americans were 1–10 in the first half of the season.)

Second Half
Team	Wins	Losses	Winning %
Union City Reds	16	6	.727
Brooklyn Jewels	16	6	.727
Brooklyn Visitations	12	8	.600
Hoboken Lisas	12	9	.571
Brooklyn Americans / Bronx St. Martins**	7	13	.350
Yonkers Knights	4	16	.250
Jersey City Palace Diamonds***	1	10	.091

** – The Brooklyn Americans became the Bronx St. Martins on February 7, 1933, following a 2–7 start for the second half of the season.
*** – The Jersey CIty Palace Diamonds would join the MBL during the second half of the season only.

== Metropolitan Basketball League Playoffs ==
Unlike the previous season of play for the Metropolitan Basketball League (and most seasons in the original iteration of the MBL), this season of the Metropolitan Basketball League would technically hold a playoff series of sorts after the second half of the season concluded for the MBL. For the Union City Reds, however, they would play a tiebreaker round against the Brooklyn Jewels for the second half of the season in order to determine the champions of that particular half of the season. If the Jewels were to win this tiebreaker for the second half of the season, they would be crowned the overall champions of the MBL by default for this season of operation.

=== Metropolitan Basketball League Second Half Tiebreaker Playoff ===
Due to the way the second half of the season concluded, the two best teams of that particular half of the season (the Union City Reds and the first half champion Brooklyn Jewels) would compete in a single game series match-up held in Union City, New Jersey on March 31, 1933, to determine the champions for the second half of the season. If the Jewels were to win it, they would not need to compete in a championship series due to them already winning the first half of the season earlier on. However, while the sole game played would go into a double-overtime match, it would be the Reds with their home court advantage in that game who would win the tense match with a 32–28 double-overtime victory in Union City's favor, thus denying the Jewels a chance at winning the MBL's championship by default this season. Because of that, the two teams would compete in a rematch championship series for the following month in April not too long afterward.

- Second Half Tiebreaker Game: March 31, 1933 @ Union City: Union City Reds 32, Brooklyn Jewels 28 (2OT)

=== Metropolitan Basketball League Championship Series ===
Following the Jewels' failure to win the MBL championship outright this season, the first half champion Brooklyn Jewels and the second half champion Union City Reds would see each other once again in a best-of-three championship series for the official conclusion of this season.

Brooklyn Jewels (1st Half Champions) Vs. Union City Reds (2nd Half Tiebreaker Champions): Brooklyn Jewels win series 2–0

- Game 1: April 12, 1933 @ Arcadia Hall (Brooklyn): Brooklyn Jewels 31, Union City Reds 23
- Game 2: April 16, 1933 @ Elks Hall (Brooklyn): Brooklyn Jewels 31, Union City Reds 16

This would be the last championship series ever held by the Metropolitan Basketball League as a whole.
