= 1933–34 Brooklyn Jewels season =

- League: American Basketball League (revived original)
- Head coach: Eddie Wilde
- General manager: Eddie Wilde
- Owner(s): Eddie Wilde
- Arena: Arcadia Hall; Elizabeth Armory(?)

Results
- Record: 26–10 (.722)
- Place: Conference: T–1st (1st half); 3rd (2nd half)
- Playoff finish: Did not qualify. (Lost first half first place tiebreaker series 2–0 to the Trenton Moose.)

The 1933–34 Brooklyn Jewels season was the third professional basketball season played by the Brooklyn Jewels franchise, as well as their first season played in the revived version of the original American Basketball League and their final full season played in Brooklyn before they essentially represented the state of New York as a whole. After completing their first two seasons as one of the best teams in the Metropolitan Basketball League, the Jewels would end up being one of five former Metropolitan Basketball League teams to leave that league for a revived version of the original American Basketball teams. While most of the rules in the revived ABL would remain the same as what the original ABL held in its history (including utilizing the old split season formatting that was held throughout most of the ABL's existence in the first place), one key difference would see games be played under three 15 minute periods instead of two 20 minute halves in an attempt to provide better results for the games played in this iteration of the ABL. With all of this in mind, the Jewels would end up getting a tied first place record with the Trenton Moose (a former (revived) Eastern Basketball League team) in the first half of the season with a 22–6 record, though they would end the second half of the season with an average 4–4 record for a third place finish behind only the recently rebranded New Britain Palaces and the undefeated Philadelphia Sphas / Hebrews for that particular half of the season. In a manner similar to their final season in the MBL, the Jewels and the Moose would compete in a tiebreaker series, though this one would not only be a best-of-three series instead of a winner-takes-all match, but it would also occur during the second half of the season instead of by the end of the regular season due to the unique looking situation at hand. Unfortunately for the Jewels, similar to their previous tiebreaker series back in the MBL, this tiebreaker series in the ABL would see the Jewels get swept by the Trenton Moose. Not only that, but because the Jewels ended up failing to win either the first half or the second half of the season, they would fail to qualify for the championship series in the ABL's first season of returning existence.

== Roster ==
Due to information on American Basketball League players being generally hard to find, there are bound to be more gaps and/or inaccuracies found in certain areas on the team's roster spots than usual.

1933–34 Brooklyn Jewels roster
Players

Pos.	No.	Player	Height	Weight	DOB	From
F/C		Matty Begovich	6 ft 5 in (1.96 m)	205 lb (93 kg)	1910-10-02	St. John's
F		Rip Gerson	5 ft 10 in (1.78 m)	165 lb (75 kg)	1906-04-06	St. John's
G/F		Mac Kinsbrunner	5 ft 9 in (1.75 m)	155 lb (70 kg)	1909-03-21	St. John's
C		Hank Knudsen	6 ft 5 in (1.96 m)	180 lb (82 kg)	1905-09-16	No college
G/F		Nat Lazar	5 ft 9 in (1.75 m)	155 lb (70 kg)	1906-01-28	St. John's
G/F		John McGuinness	5 ft 11 in (1.80 m)		1911-09-10	St. John's
G/F		Jake Poliskin	6 ft 2 in (1.88 m)	175 lb (79 kg)	1912-02-09	St. John's
G		Mac Posnack	5 ft 11 in (1.80 m)	195 lb (88 kg)	1909-06-23	St. John's
G/F		Allie Schuckman	5 ft 8 in (1.73 m)	155 lb (70 kg)	1907-11-25	St. John's
G/F		George Slott	5 ft 11 in (1.80 m)	185 lb (84 kg)	1912-06-09	St. John's
G		Harry Walters	6 ft 0 in (1.83 m)	195 lb (88 kg)	1911-04-06	Cornell

Coaches
Head coach

Eddie Wilde

Legend
- (DP) Unsigned draft pick
- (FA) Free agent
- (S) Suspended
- Injured

It's currently unknown who was officially on the roster for the team's first half tiebreaker series matchup against the Trenton Moose during the regular season.

== American Basketball League Standings ==
First Half
Team	Wins	Losses	Winning %
Trenton Moose	22	6	.786
Brooklyn Jewels	22	6	.786
Philadelphia SPHAs / Hebrews	15	12	.556
Brooklyn Visitations	12	12	.500
Bronx Americans	10	15	.400
Union City Reds	10	18	.357
Newark Bears	9	17	.346
Hoboken Thourots/Camden Brewers/New Britain Palaces^{[a]}	5	19	.208

Second Half
Team	Wins	Losses	Winning %
Philadelphia SPHAs / Hebrews	14	0	1.000
New Britain Palaces^{[a]}	7	5	.583
Brooklyn Jewels	4	4	.500
Trenton Moose	6	7	.462
Newark Bears	4	5	.444
Union City Reds	4	7	.364
Bronx Americans	2	6	.250
Brooklyn Visitations	1	8	.111

== American Basketball League Playoffs ==
Technically, this season would be a season similar to the final season of the original rendition of the ABL due to the first half of the season having a tie occur due to the Brooklyn Jewels and the Trenton Moose being tied for the first half of the season. However, the second half of the season wouldn't have a tiebreaker occur due to the Philadelphia Sphas / Hebrews going undefeated for that half of the season, meaning that half of the season wouldn't need a tiebreaker by default.

=== American Basketball League First Half Tiebreaker Series ===
Interestingly, the tiebreaker series of the first half of the season would happen during the second half of the regular season.

ABL First Half Tiebreaker Series
Game	Date	Opponent	Score	Record
Game 1	March 6	@ Trenton Moose	23–44	0–1
Game 2	March 9	Trenton Moose	14–21	0–2

Due to Trenton winning the first half of the season, they would automatically qualify for the championship series that the ABL was hosting this time around. As for the Jewels, they would fail to qualify for the championship series following this series' conclusion since the Moose and Philadelphia Sphas / Hebrews would end up winning the two respective halves of this season by its conclusion in early April.

== Notes ==
^{a} Became the Camden Brewers after losing their first 4 games of the season by November 23, 1933, then became the New Britain Palaces by January 10, 1934, after Camden won only two out of their next eight games, with New Britain entering the first half of the season with a 2–12 record afterward.
