= 1932–33 Hoboken Lisas season =

American basketball team season

- League: Metropolitan Basketball League (revived original version)
- Head coach: Doc Lisa
- General manager: Doc Lisa
- Owner(s): Doc Lisa
- Arena: Palace Garden

Results
- Record: 23–13 (.639)
- Place: Conference: 2nd (1st half); 4th (2nd half)
- Playoff finish: Did not qualify

The 1932–33 Hoboken Lisas season was the second professional basketball season played by the Hoboken Lisas franchise (who were likely named that due to the team's head coach and general manager Doc Lisa likely being the team's owner as well), as well as their final season playing under their original Lisas name. It would also end up becoming their final season played in the (revived version of the) Metropolitan Basketball League, as the revived version of the MBL would end up shutting down operations following the season's conclusion. Entering this season, the Lisas looked like they would be one of the strongest teams in the league, though they wouldn't be the strongest team around in this case. For the first half of the season, Hoboken would have an above-average 11–4 record, which placed them two games behind the Brooklyn Jewels for a first place finish in that half of the season. However, when the second half of the season occurred, the Lisas would end up having an above-average 12–9 record, which placed them in fourth place behind the Brooklyn Visitations (albeit only barely in this case), the Brooklyn Jewels, and the Union City Reds, with the last two teams tying each other for first place there. Unfortunately for Hoboken, because they failed to win first place during either half of the split season format that was used there, the Lisas would fail to qualify for the final MBL championship series ever held. Following the season's conclusion, the Hoboken Lisas would not only change their team name to the Hoboken Thourots (at least for the start of their upcoming season), but they'd also be joined by the latest MBL champions in the Brooklyn Jewels, their cityside rivals in the former ABL team known as the Brooklyn Visitations, the team they just beat in the championship series in the Union City Reds, the Union City Reds, and the Bronx St. Martins (who would become the Bronx Americans not long afterward) would end up joining the two best teams of the Eastern Basketball League in the Philadelphia Sphas and the new EBL champion Trenton Moose and the independently ran Newark Bears to recreate the original American Basketball League in a revived, yet more regional point of view under the discretion of John J. O'Brien, the MBL's creator and commissioner.

== Roster ==
Due to information on older professional basketball leagues being generally hard (if not outright impossible these days) to find for players from leagues like the revived Metropolitan Basketball League, there are bound to be more gaps and/or inaccuracies found in certain areas on the team's roster spots than usual.

Player	Position(s)
Paulie Adamo	G/F
Bill Bergin	F/C
Hal Bosch	G/F
Tom Carey	G
Sammy Gruden	G
John Jacobs	F/C
Izzy Katz	G
Jimmy Kent	G
Joe McEnroe	C/F
Sammy Moreno	G/F
Teddy Moreno	F
Moon Stetkewicz	G/F

== Metropolitan Basketball League Standings ==
First Half
Team	Wins	Losses	Winning %
Brooklyn Jewels	13	3	.812
Hoboken Lisas	11	4	.733
Brooklyn Visitations	9	6	.600
Union City Reds	9	7	.562
Long Island Pros*	8	7	.533
Yonkers Knights	8	8	.500
Paterson Continentals*	3	9	.250
Corbett's Jamaicans*	3	11	.214
Brooklyn Hillhouse / Hill House / Americans**	3	12	.200

* – Dropped out of the league during the first half of the season, with both the Paterson Continentals and the Corbett's Jamaicans being known to exit the MBL on December 30, 1932, while the Long Island Pros ended up exiting near the end of the first half of the season.
** – The Brooklyn Hillhouse team (who sometimes might have been referred to as the Brooklyn Hill House instead) was replaced by the Brooklyn Americans team following the first four games played in the first half of the season. (Presumably, the Hillhouse team was 2–2 in terms of games played this season before leaving on December 30, 1932, while the Americans were 1–10 in the first half of the season.)

Second Half
Team	Wins	Losses	Winning %
Union City Reds	16	6	.727
Brooklyn Jewels	16	6	.727
Brooklyn Visitations	12	8	.600
Hoboken Lisas	12	9	.571
Brooklyn Americans / Bronx St. Martins**	7	13	.350
Yonkers Knights	4	16	.250
Jersey City Palace Diamonds***	1	10	.091

** – The Brooklyn Americans became the Bronx St. Martins on February 7, 1933, following a 2–7 start for the second half of the season.
*** – The Jersey CIty Palace Diamonds would join the MBL during the second half of the season only.
