= 1931–32 Union City Reds season =

- League: Metropolitan Basketball League (revived original version)
- Head coach: Muggsy Miller
- General manager: Muggsy Miller(?)
- Owner(s): Muggsy Miller(?)
- Arena: Elks Clubhouse

Results
- Record: 8–4 (.667)
- Place: Conference: 3rd
- Playoff finish: Did not qualify

The 1931–32 Union City Reds season (which alternatively has been referred to as the 1932 Union City Reds season) was the first professional basketball season played by the Union City Reds franchise. Interestingly, it wouldn't be their first official season of existence as a franchise, as the Union City Reds would officially exist as a team when going as far back as 1928. However, by February 1932, the Union City Reds would be one of six new franchises joining the last (original) American Basketball League champions in the Brooklyn Visitations (an original Metropolitan Basketball League team) in what would be seen as the revived version of the Metropolitan Basketball League, which was a league created by former ABL president (and Interstate Basketball League and original Metropolitan Basketball League creator) John J. O'Brien. Unlike the rest of the seasons that this team would compete under, however, the Reds franchise might have only officially existed in the Metropolitan Basketball League back in 1932 for this season, as the team might have only truly started playing against teams back in 1932 instead of in 1931. As such, due to this awkward, yet interesting kind of formatting on display here, the 1931–32 season for both the revived version of the Metropolitan Basketball League and the Union City Reds alike (alongside the other teams competing in the revived MBL during this particular season) could reasonably be seen as just them playing in the 1932 season only instead. In any case, the Reds would barely end up becoming an above-average team in the MBL for this shortened season, since they ended up finishing the season with an 8–4 record. Unfortunately for Union City, due to the way this season was operating there, the Reds would fail to qualify for the league's championship this season since they ended up being two games behind both the Brooklyn Jewels and the eventual back-to-back champions (in terms of winning league championships) in the Brooklyn Visitations.

== Roster ==
Due to information on older professional basketball leagues being generally hard (if not outright impossible these days) to find for players from leagues like the revived Metropolitan Basketball League, there are bound to be more gaps and/or inaccuracies found in certain areas on the team's roster spots than usual.

1931–32 (1932) Union City Reds roster
Players

Pos.	No.	Player	Height	Weight	DOB	From
G		Paulie Adamo	5 ft 11 in (1.80 m)	165 lb (75 kg)	1907-01-11	Panzer College
F		Joseph Brennan	6 ft 0 in (1.83 m)	175 lb (79 kg)	1900-11-15	St. Augustine HS (NY)
C		Howie Bollerman	6 ft 8 in (2.03 m)	200 lb (91 kg)	1907-06-09	Colgate
G/F		Tony Calland	5 ft 7 in (1.70 m)	155 lb (70 kg)	1902-09-02	No college
F/C		Gaza Chizmadia	6 ft 2 in (1.88 m)	185 lb (84 kg)	1906-01-12	No college
G/F		Freddie Gerken	5 ft 9 in (1.75 m)	150 lb (68 kg)	1911-11-01	No college
G/F		Sonny Gluck	5 ft 11 in (1.80 m)	185 lb (84 kg)	1902-04-30	No college
F/C		Lefty Kintzing	6 ft 2 in (1.88 m)	200 lb (91 kg)	1905-11-30	No college
G/F		Lou Spindell	5 ft 10 in (1.78 m)	175 lb (79 kg)	1908-12-16	CCNY

Coaches
Head coach

Muggsy Miller

Legend
- (DP) Unsigned draft pick
- (FA) Free agent
- (S) Suspended
- Injured

== Metropolitan Basketball League Standings ==
Pos.	League Standings	Wins	Losses	Win %
T–1	Brooklyn Visitations	10	2	.833
T–1	Brooklyn Jewels	10	2	.833
3	Union City Reds	8	4	.667
4	Hoboken Lisas	6	6	.500
5	Brooklyn Jewish Center	4	8	.333
6	Long Island Pros	3	9	.250
7	Jamaica St. Monicas / Jamaica St. Monica Lyceum	1	11	.083
