= 1931–32 Brooklyn Jewels season =

- Conference champions
- League: Metropolitan Basketball League (revived original version)
- Head coach: Eddie Wilde
- General manager: Eddie Wilde
- Owner(s): Eddie Wilde
- Arena: Arcadia Hall

Results
- Record: 10–2 (.833)
- Place: Conference: T–1st
- Playoff finish: Lost MBL championship 2–1 to the Brooklyn Visitations.

The 1931–32 Brooklyn Jewels season (which alternatively has been referred to as the 1932 Brooklyn Jewels season) was the first professional basketball season played by the Brooklyn Jewels franchise. It's currently unknown if the Brooklyn Jewels franchise had actually existed as a proper franchise back in the year 1931 (though if that team did exist before then, no known records of their existence back then have shown up properly for them). What is known, however, is that the Jewels would be one of six new franchises joining the last (original) American Basketball League champions in the newly cityside rivaling Brooklyn Visitations (an original Metropolitan Basketball League team) in what would be seen as the revived version of the Metropolitan Basketball League, which was a league created by former ABL president (and Interstate Basketball League and original Metropolitan Basketball League creator) John J. O'Brien. Unlike the rest of the seasons that this team would compete under, the Jewels might have only officially existed in the Metropolitan Basketball League back in 1932 for this season, as the team might have only truly started existing back in 1932 instead of in 1931. As such, due to this awkward, yet interesting kind of formatting on display here, the 1931–32 season for both the revived version of the Metropolitan Basketball League and the Brooklyn Jewels alike (alongside the other teams competing in the revived MBL during this particular season) could reasonably be seen as just them playing in the 1932 season only instead. In any case, the Jewels would end up tying the Visitations for the best record in the season with an above-average 10–2 record, which would cause the MBL to host a best-of-three championship series in the city of Brooklyn, although the Visitations would supposedly have home court advantage there. Both the Jewels and the Visitations would split the first two games played (with the Visitations getting Game 1 and the Jewels winning Game 2) before the Visitations ended up repeating as champions (in terms of the leagues they played in) with the Jewels losing in a close 28–25 final match, which left the Jewels as the failing team to dethrone the Visitations this season.

== Roster ==
Due to information on older professional basketball leagues being generally hard (if not outright impossible these days) to find for players from leagues like the revived Metropolitan Basketball League, there are bound to be more gaps and/or inaccuracies found in certain areas on the team's roster spots than usual.

1931–32 (1932) Brooklyn Jewels roster
Players

| Pos. | No. | Player | Height | Weight | DOB | From |
|---|---|---|---|---|---|---|
| G/F | | Monty Banks | 5 ft 9 in (1.75 m) | 165 lb (75 kg) | 1908-02-26 | NYU |
| F | | Dave Bass | 6 ft 1 in (1.85 m) | 195 lb (88 kg) | 1911-06-21 | CCNY |
| C | | Matty Begovich | 6 ft 5 in (1.96 m) | 205 lb (93 kg) | 1910-10-02 | St. John's |
| G/F | | Barney Felix | 5 ft 9 in (1.75 m) | 155 lb (70 kg) | 1906-12-10 | NYU |
| F | | Rip Gerson | 5 ft 10 in (1.78 m) | 165 lb (75 kg) | 1906-04-06 | St. John's |
| G/F | | Bob Grody | 6 ft 2 in (1.88 m) | 215 lb (98 kg) | 1900-04-25 | Hamilton College |
| G/F | | Carl Johnson | 5 ft 8 in (1.73 m) | 150 lb (68 kg) | 1909-10-19 | William L. Dickinson HS (NJ) |
| G/F | | Mac Kinsbrunner | 5 ft 9 in (1.75 m) | 155 lb (70 kg) | 1909-03-21 | St. John's |
| G | | Mac Posnack | 5 ft 11 in (1.80 m) | 195 lb (88 kg) | 1909-06-23 | St. John's |
| G/F | | Allie Schuckman | 5 ft 8 in (1.73 m) | 155 lb (70 kg) | 1907-11-25 | St. John's |

Coaches
Head coach

Eddie Wilde

Legend
- (DP) Unsigned draft pick
- (FA) Free agent
- (S) Suspended
- Injured

== Metropolitan Basketball League Standings ==
| Pos. | League Standings | Wins | Losses | Win % |
|---|---|---|---|---|
| T–1 | Brooklyn Visitations | 10 | 2 | .833 |
| T–1 | Brooklyn Jewels | 10 | 2 | .833 |
| 3 | Union City Reds | 8 | 4 | .667 |
| 4 | Hoboken Lisas | 6 | 6 | .500 |
| 5 | Brooklyn Jewish Center | 4 | 8 | .333 |
| 6 | Long Island Pros | 3 | 9 | .250 |
| 7 | Jamaica St. Monicas / Jamaica St. Monica Lyceum | 1 | 11 | .083 |

== Metropolitan Basketball League Championship Series ==
Due to the shortened regular season combined with both Brooklyn teams tying up their regular season records with each other within the MBL, this championship series could also be seen as a tiebreaker first place series as well.

(T–1) Brooklyn Jewels Vs. (T–1) Brooklyn Visitations: Visitations win series 2–1

- Game 1: April 15, 1932 @ Arcadia Hall (Jewels): Visitations 23, Jewels 16
- Game 2: April 17, 1932 @ Elks Ballroom (Visitations): Jewels 29, Visitations 19
- Game 3: April 25, 1932 @ Elks Club (Visitations): Visitations 28, Jewels 25
