= 1932–33 Brooklyn Hillhouse / Brooklyn Americans / Bronx St. Martins season =

- League: Metropolitan Basketball League (revived original version)
- Head coach: Red Conaty
- General manager: Red Conaty(?)
- Owner(s): Red Conaty(?); Martin L. Cohen(?); Phillip Fox & Associates(?)
- Arena: Xavier Clubhouse (Brooklyn); Holy Family Auditorium (Bronx)

Results
- Record: 10–25 (.286)
- Place: Conference: 6th/9th (1st half); 5th (2nd half)
- Playoff finish: Did not qualify

The 1932–33 Brooklyn Hillhouse / Americans / Bronx St. Martins season was the first professional basketball season played by the Americans franchise, as well as their only season playing both in the revived version of the Metropolitan Basketball League and in the city of Brooklyn, with the Americans previously playing under their original Hillhouse (sometimes spelled as Hill House) and St. Martins (sometimes spelled as St. Martin's) names (with the latter name representing The Bronx area instead of the city of Brooklyn) alongside their first season playing under the rebranded Americans name. Throughout the first half of the season, the Brooklyn Hillhouse (or Hill House) later turned Brooklyn Americans near the end of the 1932 year finished that particular half of the season with a very poor 3–12 record for a last place finish, even after three other teams already folded operations by the end of that half of the season (with the Hillhouse (or Hill House) team having an average 2–2 record and the Americans having a very poor 1–10 record in the process). However, the second half of the season saw this team finish the season in a below-average 7–13 record for a fifth place finish that was ahead of only the Yonkers Knights and newly created Jersey City Palace Diamonds team that was created for only the second half of this season, with the Brooklyn Americans continuing to perform poorly with a 2–7 record before the team moved to The Bronx to become the Bronx St. Martins (sometimes referred to as the Bronx St. Martin's) to later finish the rest of the season with a somewhat better 5–6 record. In any case, the team that rebranded themselves multiple times this season would easily fail to qualify for the final MBL championship series ever held for the season. Following this season's conclusion, the Bronx St. Martins would rebrand themselves into the Bronx Americans, with the Bronx club being one of five MBL teams that also joined two of the revived Eastern Basketball League's teams in the previous EBL champion Philadelphia Sphas and the new EBL champion Trenton Moose and the independently ran Newark Bears to create what would become the revived version of the original American Basketball League.

== Roster ==
Due to information on older professional basketball leagues being generally hard (if not outright impossible these days) to find for players from leagues like the revived Metropolitan Basketball League, there are bound to be more gaps and/or inaccuracies found in certain areas on the team's roster spots than usual.

| Player | Position(s) |
|---|---|
| Rip Andrews | F |
| Dave Bass | G/F |
| Bennie Borgmann | F |
| Fred Brunelli | F |
| Dave Budnetz | G/F |
| Vinnie Burns | G/F |
| George Clough | G |
| Ed Conaty | G/F |
| Red Conaty | F |
| Buster Dunne | F/C |
| Moe Frankel | G/F |
| Joe Gilkinson | F/G |
| Harry Glotzer | G |
| Sonny Glock | G |
| Bob Grody | F/C |
| Austin Hamburger | F/G |
| Tiny Hearn | C |
| Al Kellett | C |
| Ray Kennedy | G |
| Lefty Kintzing | C/F |
| Babe Liman | G/F |
| Willie McDonald | G/F |
| Artie Musicant | G/F |
| Don Nagle | C/F |
| Honey Russell | G/F |
| Tony Schiffer | F |
| Willie Scrill | G |
| Frank Stanzi | F |
| Bob Synnott | F/C |
| Bucky Williams | G |
| Buddy Young | Unknown |

It's currently unknown who played for the Brooklyn Hillhouse (or Brooklyn Hill House) and who played for the Brooklyn Americans. However, it is known that the players that were on the Bronx St. Martins (sometimes spelled as the Bronx St. Martin's) this season included Fred Brunelli, Dave Budnetz (who was listed as an unknown guard/forward with the last name of Davenetz in the only currently known available resource at hand for past basketball rosters), Vinnie Burns, Red Conaty, Moe Frankel, Al Kellett, Babe Liman, Frank Stanzi, Bob Synnott, and Buddy Young.

== Metropolitan Basketball League Standings ==
First Half
| Team | Wins | Losses | Winning % |
|---|---|---|---|
| Brooklyn Jewels | 13 | 3 | .812 |
| Hoboken Lisas | 11 | 4 | .733 |
| Brooklyn Visitations | 9 | 6 | .600 |
| Union City Reds | 9 | 7 | .562 |
| Long Island Pros* | 8 | 7 | .533 |
| Yonkers Knights | 8 | 8 | .500 |
| Paterson Continentals* | 3 | 9 | .250 |
| Corbett's Jamaicans* | 3 | 11 | .214 |
| Brooklyn Hillhouse / Hill House / Americans** | 3 | 12 | .200 |

* – Dropped out of the league during the first half of the season, with both the Paterson Continentals and the Corbett's Jamaicans being known to exit the MBL on December 30, 1932, while the Long Island Pros ended up exiting near the end of the first half of the season.
** – The Brooklyn Hillhouse team (who sometimes might have been referred to as the Brooklyn Hill House instead) was replaced by the Brooklyn Americans team following the first four games played in the first half of the season. (Presumably, the Hillhouse team was 2–2 in terms of games played this season before leaving on December 30, 1932, while the Americans were 1–10 in the first half of the season.)

Second Half
| Team | Wins | Losses | Winning % |
|---|---|---|---|
| Union City Reds | 16 | 6 | .727 |
| Brooklyn Jewels | 16 | 6 | .727 |
| Brooklyn Visitations | 12 | 8 | .600 |
| Hoboken Lisas | 12 | 9 | .571 |
| Brooklyn Americans / Bronx St. Martins** | 7 | 13 | .350 |
| Yonkers Knights | 4 | 16 | .250 |
| Jersey City Palace Diamonds*** | 1 | 10 | .091 |

** – The Brooklyn Americans became the Bronx St. Martins on February 7, 1933, following a 2–7 start for the second half of the season.
*** – The Jersey CIty Palace Diamonds would join the MBL during the second half of the season only.
