= 1932–33 Trenton Moose season =

- League champions
- League: Eastern Basketball League (revived (original?) version)
- Head coach: Teddy Kearns
- General manager: Teddy Kearns
- Arena: Moose Hall

Results
- Record: 24–8 (.750)
- Place: Conference: 2nd (1st half); 1st (2nd half)
- Playoff finish: EBL Champions (Won 3-1 over the Philadelphia SPHAs)

The 1932–33 Trenton Moose season was presumably the 26th professional basketball season played by the Trenton Moose (and presumably their first professional season under the Moose name properly after previously using the Nationals, Trentons, Potters, Tigers, and (Royal) Bengals team names alongside the merged season in the failed "original" National Basketball League as the Greenpoint Knights of St. Anthony/Trenton Royal Bengals) of the revived (original?) version of the Eastern Basketball League. Supposedly, following the failed 1930–31 Trenton Bengals season in the minor Tri-State Basketball League and then playing independently again the season after that, the team would not only rebrand themselves into the Trenton Moose, but also joining what could be seen the revived version of the Eastern Basketball League despite one team in Philadelphia having the same Moose name as Trenton had done recently. If that point is true, then this team would essentially continue the franchise's long-standing history that would go as far back as 1898 back in the days of the National Basket Ball League. In any case, the Trenton Moose franchise entered the revived version of the Eastern Basketball League as one of six (later seven) teams competing in the essentially revived league (if only by name) to be crowned champions in the new EBL, with the Trenton Moose franchise (who would not be confused with the Philadelphia Moose franchise going forward in this page) looking to end the Philadelphia Sphas' quest to "four-peat" by being named four-time champions in this new rendition of the EBL. Interestingly, despite other EBL teams building up their rosters with the inclusion of Brooklyn Jewels players from the rivaling (revived version of the) Metropolitan Basketball League as part-time players in the EBL (including the defending champion Philadelphia Sphas themselves with Mac Posnack joining the team this season), the Moose franchise for Trenton's end would not utilize MBL players from the Brooklyn Jewels as players for their roster, as the Trenton Moose opted to sign up players that previously known for their time in the original American Basketball League (with Teddy Kearns acquiring Rusty Saunders, George Glasco, Lou Spindell, Howie Bollerman, and Honey Russell in particular) as a part of their team for this season. The decision would prove to be very effective for them, as the Trenton Moose would end up getting a second place finish for the first half of the season (behind the already well-established Philadelphia Sphas) and a first place finish with a nearly undefeated record in the second half of the season. This led to the two teams meeting up for a best-of-seven championship series, with the Trenton Moose ending the Sphas' quest to repeat as champions once again in the EBL with a 4–2 series victory in the EBL's championship series. Despite the Trenton Moose being crowned champions in the Eastern Basketball League, however, they would never have a chance to defend their championship won in the EBL since both Trenton and the runner-up Philadelphia Sphas would end up defecting from the revived EBL into the revived version of the (original) American Basketball League that would mostly feature teams from the revived version of the Metropolitan Basketball League (alongside the independently ran Newark Bears) as competition in that revived league.

== Roster ==
Due to information on older (professional) basketball leagues being generally hard (if not outright impossible these days) to find for players from leagues like the Eastern Basketball League, there are bound to be more gaps and/or inaccuracies found in certain areas on the team's roster spots than usual.

1932–33 Trenton Moose roster
Players

Pos.	No.	Player	Height	Weight	DOB	From
C		Howie Bollerman	6 ft 8 in (2.03 m)	200 lb (91 kg)	1907-06-07	Colgate
G/F		George Glasco	5 ft 10 in (1.78 m)	150 lb (68 kg)	1901-04-07	No college
C		Hank Greenberg	6 ft 3 in (1.91 m)	210 lb (95 kg)	1911-01-01	NYU
G/F		Chick Hulse	5 ft 11 in (1.80 m)	170 lb (77 kg)	1908-06-26	Rider
G/F		Jim McKinstry	5 ft 9 in (1.75 m)	148 lb (67 kg)	1907-02-13	Rider
G/F		Mickey McNiff	5 ft 10 in (1.78 m)	155 lb (70 kg)	1908-08-05	Penn
G/F		Honey Russell	6 ft 0 in (1.83 m)	180 lb (82 kg)	1902-05-31	Alexander Hamilton HS (NY)
G/F		Rusty Saunders	6 ft 2 in (1.88 m)	210 lb (95 kg)	1906-03-12	Central HS (NJ)
G/F		Lou Spindell	5 ft 10 in (1.78 m)	175 lb (79 kg)	1908-12-16	CCNY
G/F		Len Tanseer	5 ft 11 in (1.80 m)	170 lb (77 kg)	1909-04-30	Penn

Coaches
Head coach

Teddy Kearns

Legend
- (DP) Unsigned draft pick
- (FA) Free agent
- (S) Suspended
- Injured

Note: Neither Hank Greenberg nor Chick Hulse would be a part of the team's championship roster for whatever reason on their ends.

== Eastern Basketball League Standings ==
First Half
Team	Wins	Losses	Winning %
Philadelphia SPHAs	12	6	.667
Trenton Moose	10	7	.588
Philadelphia Moose	9	7	.563
Bridgeton Gems	10	8	.556
Philadelphia Jasper Jewels	7	10	.412
Wilmington Cats / Philadelphia WPEN A.C. Broadcasters*	3	13	.188

* – The Wilmington Cats would drop out of the league during the first half of the season, with the Philadelphia WPEN A.C. Broadcasters (whose team's creation was essentially involving players working at the local WPEN radio broadcasting company at the time) taking on Wilmington's spot for the rest of the season.

Second Half
Team	Wins	Losses	Winning %
Trenton Moose	14	1	.933
Philadelphia Moose	10	4	.714
Philadelphia SPHAs	8	7	.533
Bridgeton Gems	5	5	.500
Philadelphia Jasper Jewels	3	10	.231
Philadelphia WPEN A.C. Broadcasters	1	14	.067

== Eastern Basketball League Championship Series ==
Philadelphia Sphas (1st Half Champions) Vs. Trenton Moose (2nd Half Champions): Trenton Moose win series 3–1.

- Game 1 @ Philadelphia: The Philadelphia Sphas defeated the Trenton Moose 30–27.
- Game 2 @ Trenton: The Trenton Moose defeated the Philadelphia Sphas 25–28.
- Game 3 @ Philadelphia: The Trenton Moose defeated the Philadelphia Sphas 29–34.
- Game 4 @ Trenton: The Trenton Moose defeated the Philadelphia Sphas 28–34.
