= 1931–32 Hoboken Lisas season =

American basketball team season

- League: Metropolitan Basketball League (revived original version)
- Head coach: Doc Lisa
- General manager: Doc Lisa
- Owner(s): Doc Lisa
- Arena: Palace Garden

Results
- Record: 6–6 (.500)
- Place: Conference: 4th
- Playoff finish: Did not qualify

The 1931–32 Hoboken Lisas season (which alternatively has been referred to as the 1932 Hoboken Lisas season) was the first professional basketball season played by the Hoboken Lisas franchise (who were likely named that due to the team's head coach and general manager Doc Lisa likely being the team's owner as well). The Lisas were one of six new franchises joining the last (original) American Basketball League champions in the Brooklyn Visitations (an original Metropolitan Basketball League team) in what would be seen as the revived version of the Metropolitan Basketball League, which was a league created by former ABL president (and Interstate Basketball League and original Metropolitan Basketball League creator) John J. O'Brien. In any case, the Lisas would end up becoming an average team in the MBL for this shortened season, since they ended up finishing the season with a 6–6 record. Due to the way this season was operating there, Hoboken would fail to qualify for that league's championship this season.

== Roster ==
Due to information on older professional basketball leagues being generally hard (if not outright impossible these days) to find for players from leagues like the revived Metropolitan Basketball League, there are bound to be more gaps and/or inaccuracies found in certain areas on the team's roster spots than usual.

Player	Position(s)
Paulie Adamo	F
Bill Bergin	F/C
Hal Bosch	F
Stan Entrup	C
Sammy Gruden	G/F
Henry Hutter	G
John Jacobs	F/C
Ev Katz	G
Gus Rossi	C
Moon Stetkewicz	F

== Metropolitan Basketball League Standings ==
Pos.	League Standings	Wins	Losses	Win %
T–1	Brooklyn Visitations	10	2	.833
T–1	Brooklyn Jewels	10	2	.833
3	Union City Reds	8	4	.667
4	Hoboken Lisas	6	6	.500
5	Brooklyn Jewish Center	4	8	.333
6	Long Island Pros	3	9	.250
7	Jamaica St. Monicas / Jamaica St. Monica Lyceum	1	11	.083
