= Bob Synnott =

American basketball player

Personal information
- Born: September 27, 1912 New York City, New York, U.S.
- Died: November 19, 1985 (aged 73) Florida, U.S.
- Listed height: 6 ft 3 in (1.91 m)
- Listed weight: 190 lb (86 kg)

Career information
- High school: Theodore Roosevelt (New York City, New York)
- Playing career: 1932–1947
- Position: Forward / center

Career history

Playing
- 1932–1933: Bronx
- 1933–1934: Bronx Americans
- 1933–1934: Union City Reds
- 1934–1935: Cagle All-Stars
- 1934–1936: Jersey Reds
- 1934–1936: Mount Vernon Maroons
- 1935–1939: Brooklyn Visitations
- 1936–1937: Original Celtics
- 1936–1937: National City Bank
- 1936–1938: Tunkhannock
- 1939–1940: Baltimore Clippers
- 1939–1940: Troy Celtics
- 1939–1940: Brooklyn Americans
- 1939–1940: Wilkes-Barre Barons
- 1939–1941: Syracuse Reds
- 1940–1941: Knights of Columbus
- 1940–1941: Troy Monitors
- 1940–1941: New York Jewels
- 1940–1941: Original Celtics
- 1941–1942: Pittsfield Golden Bears
- 1941–1942: Schuyhill Haven
- 1941–1942: Bridgeport Newfield
- 1942–1943: Harrisburg Senators
- 1942–1944: Detroit Eagles
- 1943–1944: Brooklyn Indians
- 1943–1944: Original Celtics
- 1944–1946: Fort Wayne Zollner Pistons
- 1946: Chicago American Gears
- 1946–1947: Herkimer Mohawk Redskins
- 1946–1947: Gloversville Glovers
- 1946–1947: Utica Olympians
- 1947: Syracuse Nationals

Coaching
- 1947–1948: Utica Olympians

Career highlights
- NBL champion (1945)

Robert Thomas Synnott (September 27, 1912 – November 19, 1985) was an American professional basketball and minor league baseball player. He played for dozens of independent and professional basketball teams in the 1930s and 1940s, including stops in the Metropolitan Basketball League, American Basketball League, New York State Professional Basketball League, and National Basketball League (NBL). In the NBL, Synnott averaged 2.4 points per game for his career and also won a league championship in 1944–45 with the Fort Wayne Zollner Pistons.

Synnott played two seasons of minor league baseball for the Cumberland Colts in the Middle Atlantic League (1931, 1932). A pitcher, he recorded 11 wins and 14 losses with a 4.20 earned run average.
