= John O'Brien (basketball, born 1888) =

American basketball referee and administrator

John Jeremiah O'Brien (born November 4, 1888 – December 9, 1967) was an American basketball referee and administrator. Born in Brooklyn, New York, he was involved in organizing several early professional basketball leagues. In 1921, he founded the Metropolitan Basketball League, which had featured the Original Celtics at one point in time. From 1928 to 1953 he was an executive with American Basketball League, serving as president and, later, as chairman of the board. He was enshrined into the Basketball Hall of Fame as a contributor in 1961.
