= Bronx Americans =

American basketball team

- Game: Basketball
- League: American Basketball League
- Based in: Bronx, New York, USA

The Bronx Americans (also known as Bronx St. Martin's) was an American basketball team based in the Bronx, New York that was a member of the American Basketball League.

== Year-by-year ==
Year	League	Reg. season	Playoffs
1932/33	MBL	9th (1st half); 5th (2nd half)	Did not qualify
1933/34	ABL	5th (1st half); 7th (2nd half)	Did not qualify
