= Hoboken Thourots =

1930s American basketball team

The Hoboken Thourots were an American basketball team based in Hoboken, New Jersey that was a member of the American Basketball League.

After 4 winless games, the team moved to Camden to become the Camden Brewers on November 23, 1933.

== Year-by-year ==
Year	League	Reg. season	Playoffs
1931/32	MBL	4th	Did not qualify
1932/33	MBL	2nd (1st half); 4th (2nd half)	Did not qualify
1933/34	ABL	8th (1st half for Hoboken / Camden / New Britain); 2nd (2nd half for New Britain)	Did not qualify
