= Trenton Moose =

The Trenton Moose was an American basketball team based in Trenton, New Jersey that was a member of the Eastern Basketball League and the American Basketball League. Their first season of existence as a franchise saw them defeat the Philadelphia Sphas in what would later become the final season of the Eastern Basketball League's existence back when the Sphas would dominate that league otherwise. However, in the only season when the Moose participated in the ABL, Trenton would fail to repeat as champions over the Sphas while performing in the revived new league there.

== Year-by-year ==
Year	League	Reg. season	Playoffs
1932/33	EBL	2nd (1st half); 1st (2nd half)	Champion
1933/34	ABL	1st(t) (1st half); 4th (2nd half)	Finals
