= Union City Reds =

The Union City Reds was an American basketball team based in Union City, New Jersey that was a member of the Metropolitan Basketball League and the American Basketball League.

After the 1933/34 season the team moved to North Bergen and became the Jersey Reds.

== Year-by-year ==
Year	League	Reg. season	Playoffs
1932	MBL	3rd	Did not qualify
1932/33	MBL	4th (1st half); 1st (2nd half)	Finals
1933/34	ABL	6th (1st half); 6th (2nd half)	Did not qualify

== Notable players ==
Notable players with the Original Celtics include:

- Lou Bender (1910–2009), pioneer player with the Columbia Lions and in early pro basketball, who was later a successful trial attorney.
