= Brooklyn Jewels =

Basketball team based in Brooklyn, New York

The Brooklyn Jewels (also known as the Triangles) were an American basketball team based in Brooklyn, New York that was a member of the Metropolitan Basketball League and the American Basketball League.

After the 1933/34 season the team became the New York Jewels. During the 2nd half of the 1936/37 season, the team was renamed the Brooklyn Jewels. After that season the team became the New Haven Jewels.

The team also played in the 1941-42 season against the Grumman Aircraft Company's basketball team.

== Year-by-year ==
Year	League	Reg. season	Playoffs
1932	MBL	1st(t)	Playoffs
1932/33	MBL	1st (1st half); 2nd (2nd half)	Champion
1933/34	ABL	1st(t) (1st half); 3rd (2nd half)	1st Half Finals
1936/37	ABL	6th (2nd half)	Did not qualify
