= 1950–51 Scranton Miners season =

American Basketball League season

- League champions
- Conference champions
- League: American Basketball League (revived original)
- Head coach: Bernie Sarachak
- General manager: Bernie Sarachak(?)
- Owner(s): Joe "Speed" Maloney
- Arena: Scranton Armory

Results
- Record: 28–8 (.778)
- Place: Conference: 1st
- Playoff finish: ABL Playoffs were considered aborted due to the Utica Pros not wanting to compete against the Scranton Miners in the semifinal round alongside the lack of available armories for play in the playoffs this season. (The Scranton Miners were considered the ABL champions by default for this season due to their regular season record.)

The 1950–51 Scranton Miners season was the fifth season of the franchise and the fourth season (and third full season) of the Scranton Miners specifically from Scranton, Pennsylvania in the revived (yet weakened up) form of the American Basketball League. Entering this season, Scranton would look to defend its championship that they earned from the previous season by being one of only seven teams competing in the league. While the ABL initially would have most of its teams survive throughout the vast majority of its season, the Miners would inadvertently cause a chain reaction near the end of the season that would cause the ABL to cancel their playoffs for the entire season due to a decision involving finances involving an opponent that were going up against close to the end of the season. On February 22, 1951, the second place Wilkes-Barre Barons would surprisingly leave the ABL without much warning due to the first place defending champions wanting a $1,500 bond demand before Wilkes-Barre had their scheduled regular season finale go down on March 4. This resulted to the formatting outside of the #1 seeded defending champion Scranton Miners changing from originally being the Wilkes-Barre Barons, Paterson Crescents, and Bridgeport Aer-A-Sols (with the Aer-A-Sols being the Miners' semifinal opponent this time around) to being that of Paterson, Bridgeport, and the newly added Utica Pros instead. However, due to the combination of the Utica Pros not wanting to compete against the defending champions in the semifinal round and both Paterson and Bridgeport not having viable armories to host their playoff games for this season, the ABL made the difficult decision to cancel the ABL Playoffs entirely for this season (which further degraded the league's reputation in the process). Despite the failure to set up a proper postseason to determine a champion in their league for this season, the ABL would ultimately determine that the Scranton MIners were worthy of repeating as champions of the league due to them having the best overall record for the season even before the chain reaction that ultimately stopped the ABL Playoffs from happening went down with a 28–8 record.

== Roster ==
Due to information on American Basketball League players being generally hard to find (especially by the time the ABL was designated more as a minor league during its later years of existence), there are bound to be more gaps and/or inaccuracies found in certain areas on the team's roster spots than usual.

1950–51 Scranton Miners roster
Players

Pos.	No.	Player	Height	Weight	DOB	From
		Italo Ablondi			1925-08-25	Georgetown
F	12	Edward Bartels	6 ft 5 in (1.96 m)	195 lb (88 kg)	1925-10-08	NC State
C	9, 11	Ray Ellefson	6 ft 8 in (2.03 m)	230 lb (104 kg)	1922-09-18	Oklahoma State
G		Danny Finn	6 ft 1 in (1.85 m)	185 lb (84 kg)	1928-05-29	St. John's
G	7	Jerry Fleishman	6 ft 2 in (1.88 m)	190 lb (86 kg)	1922-02-14	NYU
G		Joe Hannon	5 ft 11 in (1.80 m)		1926-09-18	Georgetown
G	8	Ed Kassler	6 ft 2 in (1.88 m)		1923-07-21	Long Island
F/C	6	Wilbert King	6 ft 4 in (1.93 m)	217 lb (98 kg)	1916-11-15	Long Island
F	4	Nat Militzok	6 ft 3 in (1.91 m)	195 lb (88 kg)	1923-05-03	Cornell
C	6?	Elmore Morgenthaler	6 ft 9 in (2.06 m)	230 lb (104 kg)	1922-08-03	Boston College
		Alex Peterson			1924-07-20	Oregon State
C		Bill Roberts	6 ft 9 in (2.06 m)	210 lb (95 kg)	1925-03-13	Wyoming
F	3	Hank Rosenstein	6 ft 4 in (1.93 m)	185 lb (84 kg)	1920-06-16	CCNY
G	5	Vince Verdeschi	6 ft 2 in (1.88 m)		1925-03-24	Long Island

Coaches
Head coach

Bernie Sarachak

Legend
- (DP) Unsigned draft pick
- (FA) Free agent
- (S) Suspended
- Injured

== American Basketball League Standings ==
Pos.	Team	Wins	Losses	Win %
1	Scranton Miners	28	8	.778
2	Wilkes-Barre Barons^{×}^{[a]}	28	11	.718
3	Paterson Crescents	21	16	.568
4	Bridgeport Aer-A-Sols	18	15	.545
5	Utica Pros^{[b]}	17	22	.436
6	Saratoga Harlem Yankees	5	25	.167
7	Allentown / Carbondale Aces^{[c]}	4	24	.105

× – Withdrew from the ABL this season on February 22, 1951, following a $1,500 bond demand from the Scranton Miners.
* – The Allentown Aces moved from Allentown, Pennsylvania to nearby Carbondale, Pennsylvania during the season on December 28, 1950, following a 1–12 start to their season.

== Aborted American Basketball League Playoffs ==
Originally, the ABL intended to have a proper playoff series occur with the best four teams in the league competing against each other in something similar to what the formerly rivaling National Basketball League had done in certain seasons without divisions at hand where the best four teams of the season would compete against each other (in this case, had the Wilkes-Barre Barons not left the ABL left in the season, it would have had the defending ABL champion Scranton Miners competing against the recently rebranded Bridgeport Aer-A-Sols and the Wilkes-Barre Barons would have competed against the Paterson Crescents for this season). However, because Wilkes-Barre unexpectedly withdrew from the ABL late in the season on February 22, 1951, due to a $1,500 bond demand from Scranton themselves (as noted by the Barons' planned season finale on March 4, 1951, against the Scranton Miners in Scranton being cancelled), the planned ABL playoffs had Scranton going up against the new Utica Pros expansion team (who took on the fourth place spot in the ABL officially for this season) and the Paterson Crescents would go up against the Bridgeport Aer-A-Sols as the new #2 Vs. #3 seeded match-up. However, before the ABL playoffs were planned to begin, Utica voted to not participate in the planned (alternative) playoff set-up against Scranton; that surprising vote combined with the lack of armories for teams to compete in during a planned playoff tournament for the ABL (specifically for both Bridgeport and Paterson) led to the league scrapping the ABL playoffs entirely this time around (which would be somewhat similar to what happened in their 1941–42 season), with the Scranton Miners being crowned the two-time champions of the ABL following this decision. This failure by the ABL's hands would help further lead to the ABL's decline and then conclusion that happened in the 1950s decade, as well as help lead to the Paterson Crescents leaving the ABL by the end of this season alongside the aforementioned Utica Pros, though it's suggested that the Utica Pros would become the Elmira Colonels instead.

== Notes ==
^{a} The Wilkes-Barre Barons withdrew from the ABL this season on February 22, 1951 (a fair amount of time before the planned ABL playoffs were meant to begin) following a $1,500 bond demand from the Scranton Miners.
^{b} The Utica Pros were named the replacement team to enter what would have been the 1951 ABL Playoffs had they been able to begin properly, with Utica being the (new) #4 seed for the season while the Bridgeport Aer-A-Sols were named the new #3 seed instead of being the #4 seed and the Paterson Crescents were named the new #2 seed instead of being the #3 seed for this season.
^{c} The Allentown Aces moved from Allentown, Pennsylvania to nearby Carbondale, Pennsylvania during the season on December 28, 1950, following a 1–12 start to their season to become the Carbondale Aces for the rest of the season.
