= 1951–52 Scranton Miners season =

American Basketball League season

- Conference champions
- League: American Basketball League (revived original)
- Head coach: Bernie Sarachak (13–6); Herbie Gershon (11–5)
- General manager: Bernie Sarachak(?); Herbie Gershon(?)
- Owner(s): Joe "Speed" Maloney
- Arena: Scranton Armory

Results
- Record: 24–11 (.686)
- Place: Conference: 1st
- Playoff finish: Lost ABL championship 4-2 to the Wilkes-Barre Barons

The 1951–52 Scranton Miners season was the sixth season of the franchise and the fifth season (and fourth full season) of the Scranton Miners specifically from Scranton, Pennsylvania in the revived (yet weakened up) form of the American Basketball League. Entering this season, Scranton would look to become three-time champions in the ABL this season as they would be one of seven (later eight) teams competing in the now-struggling league throughout the season, though it would devolve downward to only six remaining teams by the end of the season. Unfortunately for the Miners, even though they still were one of the strongest teams in the league throughout the entire season, even they would have to deal with serious struggles throughout the season due to them needing to let go of successful head coach Bernie Sarachak and replacing him with former Paterson Crescents head coach Herbie Gershon for the rest of the season despite Sarachak having a positive record throughout the season. Luckily for Scranton, they would still end up having a successful roster to complete the season properly, as their 2411 record would be the best record in the league for another first-place finish in the ABL once again. Not only that, but for their semifinal round match-up in the ABL Playoffs, the Saratoga Harlem Yankees (who briefly moved to nearby Schenectady, New York to become the Schenectady Yankees before moving back to Saratoga, New York to become the Saratoga Harlem Yankees once again) would end up playing the entire semifinal round in Scranton, Pennsylvania due to the Harlem Yankees not having a home venue to play in for the playoffs this time around, which led to the Miners making easy work out of Saratoga before going to the championship round once again in a rematch against the #3 seeded Wilkes-Barre Barons (who returned to the ABL after controversially leaving the league the previous season due to Scranton demanding a $1,500 bond demand from the Barons). Unlike the first championship series between the two teams in the ABL, however, the two teams would look to make this series a competitive one before Wilkes-Barre ended up upsetting the two-time defending champions to win the series 4–2 to have the Barons regain the ABL's championship once again.

== Roster ==
Due to information on American Basketball League players being generally hard to find (especially by the time the ABL was designated more as a minor league during its later years of existence), there are bound to be more gaps and/or inaccuracies found in certain areas on the team's roster spots than usual.

1951–52 Scranton Miners roster
Players

Pos.	No.	Player	Height	Weight	DOB	From
G/F	3, 9	John Azary	6 ft 4 in (1.93 m)	200 lb (91 kg)	1929-10-14	Columbia
F	5	Edward Bartels	6 ft 5 in (1.96 m)	195 lb (88 kg)	1925-10-08	NC State
G/F	12	Johnny Ezersky	6 ft 3 in (1.91 m)	175 lb (79 kg)	1922-03-21	Rhode Island
G	3, 7	George Feigenbaum	6 ft 1 in (1.85 m)	185 lb (84 kg)	1928-07-02	Kentucky
G	7	Jerry Fleishman	6 ft 2 in (1.88 m)	190 lb (86 kg)	1922-02-14	NYU
G	0, 8	Ed Kassler	6 ft 2 in (1.88 m)		1923-07-21	Long Island
G	6	Bobby Kelly	6 ft 0 in (1.83 m)		1926-09-12	Manhattan
G	8	Jack Laub	6 ft 0 in (1.83 m)	200 lb (91 kg)	1926-05-09	Cincinnati
G/F	10	Carl Meinhold	6 ft 2 in (1.88 m)	185 lb (84 kg)	1926-03-29	Long Island
F	4	Nat Militzok	6 ft 3 in (1.91 m)	195 lb (88 kg)	1923-05-03	Cornell
C	6?	Elmore Morgenthaler	6 ft 9 in (2.06 m)	230 lb (104 kg)	1922-08-03	Boston College
		Alex Peterson			1924-07-20	Oregon State
F/C	7	Bill Pless	6 ft 6 in (1.98 m)	220 lb (100 kg)	1928-06-03	Cortland State
		Roy Reardon			1929-07-20	St. Francis Brooklyn
F	3	Hank Rosenstein	6 ft 4 in (1.93 m)	185 lb (84 kg)	1920-06-16	CCNY
G	3	Wally Sheil	6 ft 2 in (1.88 m)		1929-04-15	Saint Peter's

Coaches
Head coach

Bernie Sarachak
Herbie Gershon

Legend
- (DP) Unsigned draft pick
- (FA) Free agent
- (S) Suspended
- Injured

== American Basketball League Standings ==
Pos.	Team	Wins	Losses	Win %
1	Scranton Miners - z	24	11	.686
2	Elmira Colonels - x	22	18	.550
3	Wilkes-Barre Barons - x	20	19	.513
4	Saratoga Harlem Yankees / Schenectady Yankees / Saratoga Harlem Yankees*^{[a]} - x	12	16	.429
5	Manchester British-Americans**^{[b]}	8	11	.421
6	Bridgeport Roesslers	9	22	.290
7	Washington Capitols†^{[c]}	15	7	.682
8	Carbondale Aces/Middletown Guards†***^{[d]}	7	13	.350

* – The Schenectady Yankees originally moved out of Saratoga, New York to nearby Schenectady, New York on January 15, 1952, to become the Schenectady Harlem Yankees for a few games before moving back to Saratoga for the rest of their season on February 5, 1952.
** – The Manchester British-Americans joined the ABL's season on New Year's Day in 1952 after previously playing their season in Connecticut's Eastern Basketball League.
*** – According to Total Basketball: The Ultimate Basketball Encyclopedia, the Carbondale Aces might have changed their team name to the Carbondale Big Chiefs at some point during the season. Regardless of whether the Aces did do that or not, the Carbondale franchise would ultimately end up folding their operations on January 20, 1952, with their original 6–8 record being picked up by the Middletown Guards, who ended up going 1–5 on their ends for a combined 7–13 record before they ended up dropping out of the ABL themselves on February 21, 1952.
† – Did not survive the ABL season.

== American Basketball League Playoffs ==
=== American Basketball League Semifinals ===
(1) Scranton Miners Vs. (4) Saratoga Harlem Yankees: Scranton wins series 3–1

=== American Basketball League Championship Round ===
(1) Scranton Miners Vs. (3) Wilkes-Barre Barons: Wilkes-Barre wins series 4–2

== Notes ==
^{a} The Schenectady Yankees originally moved out of Saratoga, New York to nearby Schenectady, New York on January 15, 1952, to become the Schenectady Harlem Yankees for a few games before moving back to Saratoga for the rest of their season on February 5, 1952.
^{b} The Manchester British-Americans joined the ABL's season on New Year's Day in 1952 after previously playing their season in Connecticut's Eastern Basketball League.
^{c} The Washington Capitols in the ABL this season would be the same team that previously folded operations from the NBA in their 1950–51 season. However, the Capitols would fold operations on January 11, 1952 (this time, folding operations for good despite their 15–7 record at the time) due to the NBA threatening to sue the Capitols team and the ABL alike if the Capitols team were to use the same team history as the former BAA/NBA team despite the Washington Capitols technically having history with the ABL first due to them existing as a team in 1944 before becoming the Paterson Crescents in 1945.
^{d} According to Total Basketball: The Ultimate Basketball Encyclopedia, the Carbondale Aces might have changed their team name to the Carbondale Big Chiefs at some point during the season. Regardless of whether the Aces did do that or not, the Carbondale franchise would ultimately end up folding their operations on January 20, 1952, with their original 6–8 record being picked up by the Middletown Guards, who ended up going 1–5 on their ends for a combined 7–13 record before they ended up dropping out of the ABL themselves on February 21, 1952.
