= 1952–53 Scranton Miners season =

American Basketball League season

- League: American Basketball League (revived original)
- Head coach: Elmore Morgenthaler (1–4); Bernie Sarachak (11–7)
- General manager: Elmore Morgenthaler(?); Bernie Sarachak(?)
- Owner(s): Joe "Speed" Maloney; A different, unknown group sometime afterward.
- Arena: Scranton Armory

Results
- Record: 12–11 (.522)
- Place: Conference: 4th
- Playoff finish: Forfeited ABL Semifinals to the Manchester British-Americans following a 1-1 series tie due to Perry Del Purgatorio playing in the playoffs when he didn't play in their regular season roster, with ABL president John J. O'Brien ruling in favor of Manchester for their complaint against Scranton.

The 1952–53 Scranton Miners season was the seventh season of the franchise and the sixth season (and fifth full season) of the Scranton Miners specifically from Scranton, Pennsylvania in the revived (yet weakened up) form of the American Basketball League under what would ultimately become that league's final season of existence. Entering this season, Scranton were meant to be one of eight teams competing in the ABL this season before the season started out with seven teams instead due to the Jersey City Titans dropping out of the league (and almost causing the original cancellation of this ABL season entirely) after they and the Elmira Colonels originally started out their preseason periods with players that had been involved with the 1951 college basketball point-shaving scandal. Originally, the Miners would drop out of the league on December 20, 1952, following a 1–4 start to the regular season under player-coach Elmore Morganthaler due to original team owner Joe "Speed" Maloney apparently causing issues with other teams within the league due to them supposedly dodging the league minimum $300 per game guarantee payment. However, by late December 1952, the team would reorganize themselves under a new ownership group, with the team later returning to the league properly once again on January 11, 1953, with Bernie Sarachak returning as the team's head coach for the rest of the season. This change would look to help improve the team to a barely above-average 12–11 record, which saw them be ahead of the defunct Hazleton turned Glen Falls-Saratoga Harlem Yankees, the defunct Middletown Guards, and the newly added Pawtucket Slaters expansion team, but behind the Elmira Colonels, the defending ABL champion Wilkes-Barre Barons, and the Manchester British-Americans for a fourth-place finish to barely qualify for what would become the final ABL Playoffs ever held. However, even these playoffs would become controversial for the ABL due to what would occur with Scranton in the semifinal round.

Initially, the plan for the semifinal round of the ABL Playoffs would have both the #4 seeded Scranton Miners and the #1 Manchester British-Americans and the #3 seeded Elmira Colonels and the #2 seeded Wilkes-Barre Barons compete in a best-of-seven series before the remaining two teams would compete in the championship series in a proper manner. For the series between Scranton and Manchester, it originally looked like it would go as planned due to Manchester winning the first game of their series and Scranton winning the second game with a 100–94 final score. However, when the British-Americans squad realized that the Miners squad had added an extra player that wasn't on their regular season team earlier on in point guard Perry Del Purgatorio due to him previously being involved with the Korean War, Manchester would end up protesting the results of that game, much to the chagrin of commissioner John J. O'Brien, who tried to get them to drop the protest. When they would not drop it, O'Brien would decide to rule in favor of the British-Americans team, which led to Scranton deciding to drop out of the ABL Playoffs entirely due to that decision; the extra rest for Manchester following that decision may have very well later led to them sweeping the defending champion Wilkes-Barre Barons to become the final ABL champions in league history. Following the season's conclusion, multiple factors beyond the league's control would result in the ABL deciding to suspend its operations for its planned 1953–54 season before shutting down operations entirely by the time its planned 1954–55 season was set to begin operations. As for the Scranton Miners franchise themselves, after sitting out of a season of play, they would end up replacing the team that originally started the season out in the minor Eastern Professional Basketball League as the Carbondale Celtics for that same 1954–55 season after four games played in that season, with the Miners remaining there until 1970 before becoming the Scranton Apollos under the rebranded Eastern Professional Association before shutting down for good (as champions there) in 1977.

== Roster ==
Due to information on American Basketball League players being generally hard to find (especially by the time the ABL was designated more as a minor league during its later years of existence), there are bound to be more gaps and/or inaccuracies found in certain areas on the team's roster spots than usual.

1952–53 Scranton Miners roster
Players

Pos.	No.	Player	Height	Weight	DOB	From
G/F		John Azary	6 ft 4 in (1.93 m)	200 lb (91 kg)	1929-10-14	Columbia
F	6	Edward Bartels	6 ft 5 in (1.96 m)	195 lb (88 kg)	1925-10-08	NC State
G/F		Roy Belliveau	6 ft 2 in (1.88 m)		1929-04-12	Seton Hall
		Al Biolsi			1929-03-14	St. Francis Brooklyn
G	7	Tommy Birch	6 ft 1 in (1.85 m)		1928-05-18	Niagara
		Jasper Brown			Unknown	No college
G/F		Jack Curran	6 ft 0 in (1.83 m)	175 lb (79 kg)	1924	St. John's Prep (NY)
G		Perry Del Purgatorio	5 ft 1 in (1.55 m)		1928-08-29	Villanova
G		George Feigenbaum	6 ft 1 in (1.85 m)	185 lb (84 kg)	1928-07-02	Kentucky
G		Danny Finn	6 ft 1 in (1.85 m)	185 lb (84 kg)	1928-05-29	St. John's
F		Red Fitzsimmons			1932-10-02	East Stroudsburg State
G		Jerry Fleishman	6 ft 2 in (1.88 m)	190 lb (86 kg)	1922-02-14	NYU
G/F		Gary Jaffe	6 ft 2 in (1.88 m)		1928-06-17	Muhlenberg
G		Ed Kassler	6 ft 2 in (1.88 m)		1923-07-21	Long Island
G/F		Joel Kaufman	6 ft 3 in (1.91 m)	185 lb (84 kg)	1927-03-08	NYU
G		Bobby Kelly	6 ft 0 in (1.83 m)		1926-09-12	Manhattan
G/F		Carl Meinhold	6 ft 2 in (1.88 m)	185 lb (84 kg)	1926-03-29	Long Island
F		Nat Militzok	6 ft 3 in (1.91 m)	195 lb (88 kg)	1923-05-03	Cornell
C		Elmore Morgenthaler	6 ft 9 in (2.06 m)	230 lb (104 kg)	1922-08-03	Boston College
G/F		Bill Mullineaux	6 ft 2 in (1.88 m)	170 lb (77 kg)	1927-02-03	Washington College
G		Paul Nolan			1930-07-16	St. Bonaventure
F/C	7	Bill Pless	6 ft 6 in (1.98 m)	220 lb (100 kg)	1928-06-03	Cortland State
G		Roy Rubin	6 ft 1 in (1.85 m)	195 lb (88 kg)	1925-12-09	Louisville
C	6	Herb Scherer	6 ft 9 in (2.06 m)	212 lb (96 kg)	1929-12-21	Long Island
		John Schimelfenig			Unknown	No college
G		Mel Seeman			1930-11-21	NYU
G		Wally Sheil	6 ft 2 in (1.88 m)		1929-04-15	Saint Peter's
G	5	Vince Verdeschi	6 ft 2 in (1.88 m)		1925-03-24	Long Island
G/F		Bill Zirkel	6 ft 2 in (1.88 m)		1927-07-20	West Virginia

Coaches
Head coach

Elmore Morgenthaler
Bernie Sarachak

Legend
- (DP) Unsigned draft pick
- (FA) Free agent
- (S) Suspended
- Injured

Note: In addition to all of those players, they would also have a bunch of unknown players that briefly played on the team as well, with known last names listed to have played on the lister on the known resources including a player with the last name of Bell (who might potentially be a shortened up version of Roy Belliveau for some odd reason), someone with the last name of Bergen (though it's possible it also was Burger instead for some odd reason), someone with the last name of either Ditomonsin or DiTomassi (though it's likely to be Mike DiTomasso), someone with the last name of Kaufman (likely Joel Kaufman), someone with the last name of Offerman, and someone (namely a guard) with the last name of either Stanislno(?) or Stanisleau (most likely Stanisleau). In addition to them, it's also unknown what the players from the final ABL Playoffs ever held would be for Scranton during the games played this time around, though it is known that Perry Del Purgatorio is a player that was on that team for Game 2 despite being considered ineligible by the ABL, which later led to the Miners leaving the ABL for good by the end of the season after they previously briefly left the league earlier in the season.

== American Basketball League Standings ==
Pos.	Team	Wins	Losses	Win %
1	Manchester British-Americans - z	19	9	.679
2	Wilkes-Barre Barons - x	20	11	.550
3	Elmira Colonels*^{[a]} - x	17	11	.607
4	Scranton Miners*^{[b]} - x	12	11	.522
5	Pawtucket Slaters	6	19	.240
6	Middletown Guards†**^{[c]}	2	5	.286
7	Hazleton / Glen Falls-Saratoga Harlem Yankees†***^{[d]}	1	11	.083

* – Team briefly dropped out of the ABL during the season before returning to the league later on within the season.
** – The Middletown Guards dropped out of the ABL on January 8, 1953, and then disbanded as a franchise two days later on January 10, 1953.
*** – The Hazleton Harlem Yankees started their season out in Hazleton, Pennsylvania before they moved out two games into their season on December 4, 1952, to move back to Saratoga Springs, New York with games also played in Glen Falls, New York to become the Glen Falls-Saratoga Harlem Yankees for the rest of their season up until they ceased operations and withdrew operations on February 6, 1953.
† – Did not survive the ABL season.

== American Basketball League Playoffs ==
=== American Basketball League Semifinals ===
Originally, the #4 seeded Scranton Miners would go up against the #1 seeded Manchester British-Americans in a best-of-seven semifinal round series. After Manchester had previously beaten the Miners in the first game out in Manchester, Connecticut (where the score and date is currently unknown at this time), Scranton would defeat the British-Americans with a 100–94 final score on March 14, 1952, in Scranton, Pennsylvania to even up the semifinal round for that series. However, Game 2 was met with controversy from Manchester due to Scranton utilizing the services of Perry Del Purgatorio, who had recently been discharged from his services within the U.S. military following the upcoming conclusion of the Korean War, but hadn't played in any previous games that season. While ABL President John J. O'Brien did acknowledge that the "league had operated with many rule infractions this season" and tried to get the British-Americans team to drop their protest for the playoff game that had been played, the Manchester squad would not do so, which later led to O'Brien ruling in favor of the Manchester British-Americans. Following that awkward situation at hand, the Scranton Miners decided to quit out on the ABL for the rest of the season, which led to the Manchester British-Americans automatically qualifying for the ABL's championship series by default, which subsequently marked the first and only time in the league's history where such a thing would happen in the first place.

== Notes ==
^{a} The Elmira Colonels dropped out of the ABL on October 23, 1952, alongside the Jersey City Titans due to the Colonels having Bill Spivey on their roster at the time (with the Titans having multiple players that were previously a part of the 1951 college basketball point-shaving scandal themselves as well). Initially, the Colonels tried to be an exhibition team for the season, but after a few games, they decided to cut Bill Spivey from their roster in order to return to the ABL and have the league restart their season properly with seven teams playing throughout the season instead of eight teams playing this season.
^{b} The Scranton Miners previously dropped out of the ABL on December 20, 1952, due to original team owner Joe "Speed" Maloney charging other owners with evading the league's minimum guarantee of $300 per game before they reorganized themselves under a new group of management within late December 1952 before returning to the ABL by January 10, 1953, though Scranton would later withdraw operations from the league during the ABL's playoffs (with an impromptu forfeit defeat resulting in the Manchester British-Americans going into the championship round for this season) following a controversial ruling regarding a playoff match held on March 14, 1953.
^{c} The Middletown Guards dropped out of the ABL on January 8, 1953, and then disbanded as a franchise two days later on January 10, 1953.
^{d} The Hazleton Harlem Yankees started their season out in Hazleton, Pennsylvania before they moved out two games into their season on December 4, 1952, to move back to Saratoga Springs, New York with games also played in Glen Falls, New York to become the Glen Falls-Saratoga Harlem Yankees for the rest of their season up until they ceased operations and withdrew operations on February 6, 1953.
