= 1949–50 Scranton Miners season =

American Basketball League season

- League champions
- Conference champions
- League: American Basketball League (revived original)
- Head coach: Bernie Sarachak (player-coach?)
- General manager: Bernie Sarachak(?)
- Owner(s): Joe "Speed" Maloney
- Arena: Scranton Armory

Results
- Record: 27–11 (.711)
- Place: Conference: 1st
- Playoff finish: Won ABL championship series 3-2 over the Bridgeport Aer-A-Sols

The 1949–50 Scranton Miners season was the fourth season of the franchise and the third season (and second full season) of the Scranton Miners specifically from Scranton, Pennsylvania in the revived (yet weakened up) form of the American Basketball League. Entering this season, Scranton would once again be one of eight teams competing in the league to start out the season, although it would later conclude with only six teams remaining in the ABL by the end of the season due to the Schenectady Packers and Trenton Tigers turned Cohoes Marras folding operations during the season. This season would see Bernie Sarachak take on the role of the team's (potential) player-coach on a full-time basis throughout the entire season after previously only holding onto it under a partial basis during the previous season. That decision alongside the leading scoring abilities of 7'1" center Elmore Morganthaler would see Scranton lead the ABL with the best record throughout the entire season with a 27–11 record, being well ahead of the two-time defending champion Wilkes-Barre Barons, who would be their semifinal round opponent in the ABL Playoffs. After the Miners and Barons split their first two games played in the series, both Scranton and Wilkes-Barre would take part in a triple-overtime thriller that resulted in the Scranton Miners getting a 103–99 win over the two-time defending champion Wilkes-Barre Barons, thus eliminating the defending champions from the playoffs and earning their own shot at the league's championship against the #2 seeded Bridgeport Aer-A-Sols. Despite the Miners winning their first two games in the championship round over the Aer-A-Sols, Bridgeport would come back and even the series up against Scranton before the Scranton Miners won the decisive Game 5 with a blowout 85–59 final score to gain their first championship in franchise history.

== Roster ==
Due to information on American Basketball League players being generally hard to find (especially by the time the ABL was designated more as a minor league during its later years of existence), there are bound to be more gaps and/or inaccuracies found in certain areas on the team's roster spots than usual.

1949–50 Scranton Miners roster
Players

Pos.	No.	Player	Height	Weight	DOB	From
		Mason Benson			1927-05-11	CCNY
		Kelly Brofman			1923-06-15	Long Island
F	4	Chili Edelstein			1923-03-16	Long Island
G/F		Pop Gates	6 ft 0 in (1.83 m)	180 lb (82 kg)	1917-08-30	Benjamin Franklin HS (NY)
F		Doug Holcomb	6 ft 4 in (1.93 m)	200 lb (91 kg)	1925-02-09	Wisconsin
G	9	Ed Kassler	6 ft 2 in (1.88 m)		1923-07-21	Long Island
G	7	Bobby Kelly	6 ft 0 in (1.83 m)		1926-09-12	Manhattan
F/C	12	Wilbert King	6 ft 4 in (1.93 m)	217 lb (98 kg)	1916-11-15	Long Island
G/F	8	Carl Meinhold	6 ft 2 in (1.88 m)	185 lb (84 kg)	1926-03-29	Long Island
F	4, 6	Nat Militzok	6 ft 3 in (1.91 m)	195 lb (88 kg)	1923-05-03	Cornell
C	6	Elmore Morgenthaler	6 ft 9 in (2.06 m)	230 lb (104 kg)	1922-08-03	Boston College
F	5	Hank Rosenstein	6 ft 4 in (1.93 m)	185 lb (84 kg)	1920-06-16	CCNY
		Bernie Sarachak			1912-10-19	No college
G	11	Vince Verdeschi	6 ft 2 in (1.88 m)		1925-03-24	Long Island
PG	3	Eddie Younger	5 ft 7 in (1.70 m)	145 lb (66 kg)	1923-01-07	Long Island

Coaches
Head coach

Bernie Sarachak

Legend
- (DP) Unsigned draft pick
- (FA) Free agent
- (S) Suspended
- Injured

== American Basketball League Standings ==
Pos.	Team	Wins	Losses	Win %
1	Scranton Miners	27	11	.711
2	Bridgeport Aer-A-Sols	22	13	.629
3	Wilkes-Barre Barons	21	17	.552
4	New York / Saratoga Harlem Yankees*^{[a]}	21	17	.552
5	Paterson Crescents	17	18	.486
6	Hartford Hurricanes	11	26	.297
7	Trenton Tigers / Cohoes Marras**†^{[b]}	4	16	.200
8	Schenectady Packers†^{[c]}	0	4	.000

† – Did not survive the ABL season.
* – The New York Harlem Yankees moved to Saratoga, New York (though they presumably played some of their games in Schenectady, New York) during the season.
** – The Trenton Tigers would end up moving to Cohoes, New York after being without a home venue for a month straight before later folding operations without winning a single game in Cohoes under their new Cohoes Marras name.

== American Basketball League Playoffs ==
=== American Basketball League Semifinals ===
(1) Scranton Miners Vs. (3) Wilkes-Barre Barons: Scranton wins series 2–1

- Game 1: March 19, 1950 @ Scranton: Scranton 60, Wilkes-Barre 49
- Game 2: March 22, 1950 @ Wilkes-Barre: Wilkes-Barre 89, Scranton 83
- Game 3: March 26, 1950 @ Scranton: Scranton 103, Wilkes-Barre 99 (3 OT)

=== American Basketball League Championship Series ===
(1) Scranton Miners Vs. (2) Bridgeport Aer-A-Sols: Scranton wins series 3–2

- Game 1: April 2, 1950 @ Scranton: Scranton 88, Bridgeport 67
- Game 2: April 9, 1950 @ Bridgeport: Scranton 85, Bridgeport 73
- Game 3: April 12, 1950 @ Scranton: Bridgeport 68, Scranton 65
- Game 4: April 14, 1950 @ Bridgeport: Bridgeport 78, Scranton 73
- Game 5: April 16, 1950 @ Scranton: Scranton 85, Bridgeport 59

== Awards and honors ==
By the end of the season, the 7'1" center Elmore Morgenthaler would end up being the leading scorer of the entire league for the seventeenth season of its return and its 23rd overall season of its existence with 728 points scored for an average of 19.7 points per game.

== Notes ==
^{a} The New York Harlem Yankees moved to Saratoga, New York (though they presumably played some of their games in Schenectady, New York) to become the Saratoga Harlem Yankees at some currently unknown point in time during this season.
^{b} The Trenton Tigers would move to Cohoes, New York to become the Cohoes Marras on January 7, 1950 after previously playing as a road team only from December 11-28, 1949 (with their road trip leading to nothing but defeats) before the Trenton Tigers turned Cohoes Marras folded operations by either January 30 or February 1, 1950.
^{c} The Schenectady Packers would end up dropping out of the ABL on November 23, 1949.
