= 1948–49 Scranton Miners season =

American Basketball League season

- League: American Basketball League (revived original)
- Head coach: Buck Freeman (1–1); Red Wallace (15–12); Bernie Sarachak (10–2)
- General manager: Buck Freeman(?); Red Wallace(?); Bernie Sarachak(?)
- Owner(s): Joe "Speed" Maloney
- Arena: Scranton Armory

Results
- Record: 26–15 (.634)
- Place: Conference: 2nd
- Playoff finish: Lost ABL championship 3-2 to the Wilkes-Barre Barons

The 1948–49 Scranton Miners season was the third season of the franchise and the second season (and first full season) of the Scranton Miners specifically from Scranton, Pennsylvania in the revived (yet weakened up) form of the American Basketball League. Entering this season, Scranton would be one of eight teams competing in the league once again, though not the exact same eight teams from the previous season due to the Bridgeport Newfield Steelers replacing the EPBL's Lancaster (Red) Roses and the Philadelphia SPHAs initially moving to Atlantic City, New Jersey to become the Atlantic City Tides at first before returning to Philadelphia, Pennsylvania to become the SPHAs once again for the rest of the season not long afterward. Originally, Buck Freeman from the University of Scranton would try and coach the team while also coaching his college basketball squad, but after only two games coaching the Miners, Freeman would resign from his position in the ABL, which led to him being replaced by two different player-coaches in Red Wallace and Bernie Sarachak for the rest of the season. Despite the sudden changes throughout the season, Scranton would end up having their best season in the ABL by this point in their early history as a franchise with an above-average 26–15 record for a second place finish to be behind only the defending champion Wilkes-Barre Barons for an easy qualification for the ABL Playoffs this season. After waiting for the long-standing Paterson Crescents and newly-added Bridgeport Newfield Steelers to play their fourth place tiebreaker match to determine the final spot in the ABL Playoffs, Scranton would go up against the Crescents out in nearby Paterson for the semifinal round; while the series would be surprisingly tense and close, Scranton would ultimately sweep their close rivals 2–0 to get a shot at the championship series against the defending champion Barons. After losing the first game of the series, Scranton would end up winning their next two games in the championship series to have a shot at stealing the series away from Wilkes-Barre, though the Miners would ultimately blow the series by losing their final two games to be eliminated 3–2 by the defending champions of the ABL.

== Roster ==
Due to information on American Basketball League players being generally hard to find (especially by the time the ABL was designated more as a minor league during its later years of existence), there are bound to be more gaps and/or inaccuracies found in certain areas on the team's roster spots than usual.

1948–49 Scranton Miners roster
Players

Pos.	No.	Player	Height	Weight	DOB	From
F	6	Chili Edelstein			1923-03-16	Long Island
F		Marshall Gemberling			1924-08-06	Lebanon Valley
F		Doug Holcomb	6 ft 4 in (1.93 m)	200 lb (91 kg)	1925-02-09	Wisconsin
		Tony Karpowich			1919-08-20	Fordham
G	3	Ed Kassler	6 ft 2 in (1.88 m)		1923-07-21	Long Island
F/C	5	Wilbert King	6 ft 4 in (1.93 m)	217 lb (98 kg)	1916-11-15	Long Island
C	10, 12	Don Kotter	6 ft 7 in (2.01 m)	195 lb (88 kg)	1920-12-29	Long Island
G		Dan Kraus	6 ft 0 in (1.83 m)	195 lb (88 kg)	1923-02-13	Georgetown
G/F	11	Dick Kraus	6 ft 3 in (1.91 m)	190 lb (86 kg)	1926-09-30	West Virginia
F	7	Nat Militzok	6 ft 3 in (1.91 m)	195 lb (88 kg)	1923-05-03	Cornell
		John Padgett			1923-11-14	Murray State
C		John Phoenix	6 ft 9 in (2.06 m)		1924-04-02	Idaho
		Harold Reis			1923-10-31	Kentucky Wesleyan
		Aaron Rosovsky			1929-05-14	Iona
F	4	Hank Rosenstein	6 ft 4 in (1.93 m)	185 lb (84 kg)	1920-06-16	CCNY
		Howard Sanders			1923-10-27	Miami (OH)
	8	Bernie Sarachak			1912-10-19	No college
G	2	Vince Verdeschi	6 ft 2 in (1.88 m)		1925-03-24	Long Island
G	9	Red Wallace	6 ft 1 in (1.85 m)	185 lb (84 kg)	1918-07-12	Scranton
		Jimmy Weston			1922-11-02	St. John's
G/F		Al Widmar	6 ft 3 in (1.91 m)	185 lb (84 kg)	1925-03-20	Cathedral Latin HS (OH)
PG	1	Eddie Younger	5 ft 7 in (1.70 m)	145 lb (66 kg)	1923-01-07	Long Island

Coaches
Head coach

Buck Freeman
Red Wallace
Bernie Sarachak

Legend
- (DP) Unsigned draft pick
- (FA) Free agent
- (S) Suspended
- Injured

== American Basketball League Standings ==
Pos.	Team	Wins	Losses	Win %
1	Wilkes-Barre Barons	29	12	.707
2	Scranton Miners	26	15	.634
3	Trenton Tigers	25	16	.610
T–4	Paterson Crescents	24	17	.585
T–4	Bridgeport Newfield Steelers	24	17	.585
6	Hartford Hurricanes / Caps	13	26	.333
7	Brooklyn Gothams	10	30	.250
8	Atlantic City Tides / Philadelphia SPHAs^{[a]}	8	26	.235

The Paterson Crescents would defeat the Bridgeport Newfield Steelers 99–80 on March 26, 1949 in the fourth place tiebreaker match for the season, which would ensure their qualification for the 1949 ABL Playoffs for this season.

== American Basketball League Playoffs ==
=== American Basketball League Semifinals ===
(2) Scranton Miners Vs. (4) Paterson Crescents: Scranton wins series 2–0

- Game 1: March 31, 1949 @ Scranton: Scranton 68, Paterson 66
- Game 2: April 2, 1949 @ Paterson: Scranton 67, Paterson 65

=== American Basketball League Championship Round ===
(2) Scranton Miners Vs. (1) Wilkes-Barre Barons: Wilkes-Barre wins series 3–2

- Game 1: April 7, 1949 @ Wilkes-Barre: Wilkes-Barre 71, Scranton 60
- Game 2: April 10, 1949 @ Scranton: Scranton 75, Wilkes-Barre 70
- Game 3: April 12, 1949 @ Wilkes-Barre: Scranton 74, Wilkes-Barre 62
- Game 4: April 20, 1949 @ Scranton: Wilkes-Barre 72, Scranton 56
- Game 5: April 22, 1949 @ Wilkes-Barre: Wilkes-Barre 58, Scranton 47

== Notes ==
^{a} Before this season began, the Philadelphia Sphas moved from Philadelphia, Pennsylvania to Atlantic City, New Jersey to become the Atlantic City Tides in an effort to survive for the long-term. However, after having disappointing attendance results for home games at the Million Dollar Pier in Atlantic City, the team returned to Philadelphia to become the Sphas once again for the rest of the season going forward into their existence on January 16, 1949, with them playing their final home games as a professional basketball team back at their primary home court in the ballroom area of the Broadwood Hotel.
