= 1951–52 Washington Capitols season =

ABL professional basketball team season

- League: American Basketball League (revived original)
- Head coach: Chick Reiser
- Owner(s): Mike Uline
- Arena: Uline Arena

Results
- Record: 15–7 (.682)
- Place: Conference: N/A (Unofficially 7th)
- Playoff finish: Did not qualify (Folded operations on January 11, 1952.)

The 1951–52 Washington Capitols season was the sixth and final season played by the Washington Capitols (who are considered related to the former BAA/NBA team of the same name) in their only season in the original American Basketball League, which was in its 25th (and penultimate) season of existence when combining the six seasons of its original run with the nineteen seasons in its more recent run at this point in time after their hiatus in relation to the Great Depression (though by that point in time, the ABL was more seen as a minor league than a rivaling professional basketball league to the NBA and was barely getting by as it was). After the original Washington Capitols NBA franchise folded operations on January 9, 1951, thus failing to complete what would be their final season in the NBA properly, the team would end up deciding to reactive itself for the following season in the smaller American Basketball League, which had six other teams to compete alongside them by this point in time.

== Season overview ==
Early on in the season, the Washington Capitols under head coach Chick Reiser and some former NBL and/or BAA/NBA players on their team alongside some players that were only competing in the ABL looked to have a promising comeback in the smaller looking ABL by starting their season out with a 10–3 record, seeing themselves be at second place in the league behind (probably) only the two-time defending ABL champion Scranton Miners at the time. However, after a certain point in their only season in the ABL, the Washington Capitols were not only facing financial struggles despite playing in the smaller ABL, but also facing legal consequences by the NBA due to them threatening to sue both the team and the ABL itself for looking to take away that Washington Capitols franchise's team history away from the NBA since they had the original copyright license for the team name in question despite the Washington Capitols name previously existing as a team in the ABL (albeit not as this current franchise or previous BAA/NBA franchise since the previously existing Capitols franchise the ABL had first played in the 1944–45 season before moving to Paterson, New Jersey on New Year's Day of 1945 to become the Paterson Crescents for the rest of their existence onward). Either way, on January 11, 1952, over two days after their one-year anniversary of when the original Washington Capitols NBA franchise dropped out of the 1950–51 NBA season, this version of the Washington Capitols would drop out of the ABL for the rest of its 1951–52 season as well (this time not coming back for good), though this team that dropped out did so with a much better 15–7 record that had them at second place in the ABL at the time it was made official. Had this team continued to play out the rest of their season properly, there would be a chance that they could have won the 1951–52 ABL championship instead of the eventual ABL champion Wilkes-Barre Barons after previously dropping out of the NBA a season earlier. Either way, this marked the only time a former NBA team would technically defect from the NBA without creating their own league to go up against it (similar to how the Anderson Packers, the original Denver Nuggets, the Sheboygan Red Skins, and the Waterloo Hawks tried to compete against the NBA with their short-lived National Professional Basketball League) and instead had them compete in a different professional basketball league of sorts (in this case, the ABL) in the process.

A future professional basketball team in the American Basketball Association would later be created through the inspiration of the original Washington Capitols team name, with this team being named the Washington Caps. They would use that name following the Oakland Oaks' sole championship season in the ABA due to financial problems and the Caps would exist only for the 1969–70 ABA season due to the previous year's riots relating to the civil rights movement following the assassination of Martin Luther King Jr. before they moved to the nearby state of Virginia to become the Virginia Squires for the rest of their existence as an ABA franchise. A new NBA franchise in Washington, D.C. would later be made official when the Capital Bullets (playing in nearby Landover, Maryland after previously going by the Baltimore Bullets (who hold no existing relationship with the former ABL/BAA/NBA franchise of the same name) for the majority of their existence after previously having two failed seasons with prior names of the Chicago Packers and Chicago Zephrys in Chicago)) decided to officially become the Washington Bullets from 1974 until 1997 (winning the 1978 NBA Finals under the Washington Bullets name) when they decided to rename themselves to the Washington Wizards, which they still use to this very day.

== Roster ==
Due to information on American Basketball League players being generally hard to find, there are bound to be more gaps and/or inaccuracies found in certain areas on the team's roster spots than usual.

1951–52 Washington Capitols roster
Players

Pos.	No.	Player	Height	Weight	DOB	From
G/F		Carl Braun	6 ft 5 in (1.96 m)	180 lb (82 kg)	1927-09-25	Colgate
		Bill Cain			1918-11-24	Morgan State
G		Sidney Hertzberg	5 ft 10 in (1.78 m)	175 lb (79 kg)	1922-07-29	CCNY
G		Harold Hunter	5 ft 9 in (1.75 m)	175 lb (79 kg)	1926-04-30	North Carolina Central
		Leroy Ishman			1926-11-30	American
		Gene Janis			1926-05-26	Mount St. Mary's
		Bob Lamon			1917-09-15	American
G/F		Fred Lewis	6 ft 2 in (1.88 m)	195 lb (88 kg)	1921-01-06	Eastern Kentucky
G		Eddie Lyons			1926-07-01	Temple
G/F		Ken Murray	6 ft 2 in (1.88 m)	190 lb (86 kg)	1928-04-20	St. Bonaventure
G		John O'Boyle	6 ft 2 in (1.88 m)	185 lb (84 kg)	1928-03-07	Colorado State
G/F		Dick O'Keefe	6 ft 2 in (1.88 m)	185 lb (84 kg)	1923-09-29	Santa Clara
G		Tommy O'Keefe	6 ft 2 in (1.88 m)	185 lb (84 kg)	1914-12-17	Georgetown
C		Herb Scherer	6 ft 9 in (2.06 m)	212 lb (96 kg)	1929-12-21	Long Island
F		Dick Schnittker	6 ft 5 in (1.96 m)	200 lb (91 kg)	1928-05-27	Ohio State
		Don Slattery			1932-11-25	John Adams HS (NY)
C		Jim Slaughter	6 ft 11 in (2.11 m)	210 lb (95 kg)	1928-05-13	South Carolina
G/F		Hal Tidrick	6 ft 1 in (1.85 m)	190 lb (86 kg)	1915-08-04	Washington & Jefferson

Coaches
Head coach

Chick Reiser

Legend
- (DP) Unsigned draft pick
- (FA) Free agent
- (S) Suspended
- Injured

Roster

In addition to all of those players, another player that was on the roster for a game played on New Year's Day in 1952 against the recently joined Manchester British-Americans ABL team with the last name of "Harris" was also on the roster, though his actual identity remains unknown as of 2025. Not only that, but another unknown individual who had the last name of "Kane" was supposedly also on the roster as well as this "Harris" individual in question, though no confirmed record of this "Kane" individual playing for the Capitols has ever been confirmed true for him as well.

== Season standings ==
Pos.	Team	Wins	Losses	Win %
1	Scranton Miners - z	24	11	.686
2	Elmira Colonels - x	22	18	.550
3	Wilkes-Barre Barons - x	20	19	.513
4	Saratoga Harlem Yankees / Schenectady Yankees / Saratoga Harlem Yankees* - x	12	16	.429
5	Manchester British-Americans**	8	11	.421
6	Bridgeport Roesslers	9	22	.290
7	Washington Capitols†	15	7	.682
8	Carbondale Aces/Middletown Guards†***	7	13	.350

* – The Schenectady Yankees originally moved out of Saratoga, New York to nearby Schenectady, New York on January 15, 1952 to become the Schenectady Harlem Yankees for a few games before moving back to Saratoga for the rest of their season on February 5, 1952.
** – The Manchester British-Americans joined the ABL's season on New Year's Day in 1952 after previously playing their season in Connecticut's Eastern Basketball League.
*** – According to Total Basketball: The Ultimate Basketball Encyclopedia, the Carbondale Aces might have changed their team name to the Carbondale Big Chiefs at some point during the season. Regardless of whether the Aces did do that or not, the Carbondale franchise would ultimately end up folding their operations on January 20, 1952, with their original 6–8 record being picked up by the Middletown Guards, who ended up going 1–5 on their ends for a combined 7–13 record before they ended up dropping out of the ABL themselves on February 21, 1952.
† – Did not survive the ABL season.
