= 1950–51 Allentown / Carbondale Aces season =

American Basketball League season

- League: American Basketball League (revived original)
- Head coach: Jay Birney Crum (1–8); Jim Nolan (3–16)
- General manager: Jim Nolan
- Owner(s): Jim Nolan
- Arena: Allentown Armory; Bethlehem Armory(?); Carbondale Armory

Results
- Record: 4–24 (.143)
- Place: Conference: 7th
- Playoff finish: Did not qualify. (No playoffs were officially held that season anyway.)

The 1950–51 Allentown / Carbondale Aces season was the first season of play for the Aces franchise, as well their only season of play in Allentown, Pennsylvania (although it's alleged they also played in Bethlehem, Pennsylvania as well to the point of sometimes being called the Allenbeth Aces instead) before they moved to nearby Carbondale, Pennsylvania to go from the Allentown Aces to the more well-known Carbondale Aces throughout most of their time spent in the revived (yet struggling) original version of the American Basketball League. Entering this season, the Aces would be one of seven teams competing for the ABL's championship this time around, though the ABL would end up seeing a chain reaction occur near the end of the season where they wouldn't be able to have a proper playoff series occur properly for this season. Throughout the season, the Aces would struggle as one of the worst teams in the entire league, to the point where the team would move from Allentown, Pennsylvania (or Bethlehem, Pennsylvania) to nearby Carbondale, Pennsylvania by December 28, 1950. Despite their move near the end of the 1950 year, the Aces would fail to improve upon their own fortunes throughout the season, as they'd end up with a 4–24 record for a last place finish (though they were close to tying with the Saratoga Harlem Yankees for a sixth-place finish instead), with the ABL ultimately not having a proper playoff system to utilize for making their regular season elimination worthwhile in the end. Interestingly enough, this would also be the only professional season of play for former Manhattan College guard/forward Henry "Hank" Poppe (though this wasn't the only professional team he'd end up playing with that season), who was a key player that was involved in the 1951 college basketball point-shaving scandal before later resulting in 34 (later 35) players being discovered to be involved in the scandal officially, as Poppe would participate with the Aces in a few games while they were in Allentown (or Bethlehem) specifically.

== Roster ==
Due to information on American Basketball League players being generally hard to find (especially by the time the ABL was designated more as a minor league during its later years of existence), there are bound to be more gaps and/or inaccuracies found in certain areas on the team's roster spots than usual.

Player	Position(s)
Pete Clark	Unknown
Joe Colone	F
Harry Donovan	G
George Feigenbaum	G
Al Gifford	Unknown
Coulby Gunther	F
Ted Hanauer	Unknown
Herb Lyon	Unknown
Eddie Lyons	Unknown
Dick McGee	Unknown
Jack McLaughlin	Unknown
Bob O'Brien	F/C
Dick O'Keefe	G/F
Cas Ostrowski	G
Dick Pfeiffer	Unknown
Bill Pless	F/C
Hank Poppe	G/F
Johnny Rusinko	Unknown
Al Saemmer	Unknown
Herb Scherer	C
Wally Sheil	G
Jackie Swartz	Unknown
Milt Ticco	G/F
Al Widmar	Unknown

== American Basketball League Standings ==
Pos.	Team	Wins	Losses	Win %
1	Scranton Miners	28	8	.778
2	Wilkes-Barre Barons^{×}^{[a]}	28	11	.718
3	Paterson Crescents	21	16	.568
4	Bridgeport Aer-A-Sols	18	15	.545
5	Utica Pros^{[b]}	17	22	.436
6	Saratoga Harlem Yankees	5	25	.167
7	Allentown / Carbondale Aces^{[c]}	4	24	.105

× – Withdrew from the ABL this season on February 22, 1951, following a $1,500 bond demand from the Scranton Miners.
* – The Allentown Aces moved from Allentown, Pennsylvania to nearby Carbondale, Pennsylvania during the season on December 28, 1950, following a 1–12 start to their season.

== Aborted American Basketball League Playoffs ==
Originally, the ABL intended to have a proper playoff series occur with the best four teams in the league competing against each other in something similar to what the formerly rivaling National Basketball League had done in certain seasons without divisions at hand where the best four teams of the season would compete against each other (in this case, had the Wilkes-Barre Barons not left the ABL left in the season, it would have had the defending ABL champion Scranton Miners competing against the recently rebranded Bridgeport Aer-A-Sols and the Wilkes-Barre Barons would have competed against the Paterson Crescents for this season). However, because Wilkes-Barre unexpectedly withdrew from the ABL late in the season on February 22, 1951, due to a $1,500 bond demand from Scranton themselves, the planned ABL playoffs had Scranton going up against the new Utica Pros expansion team (who took on the fourth place spot in the ABL officially for this season) and the Paterson Crescents would go up against the Bridgeport Aer-A-Sols as the new #2 Vs. #3 seeded match-up. However, before the ABL playoffs were planned to begin, Utica voted to not participate in the planned (alternative) playoff set-up against Scranton; that surprising vote combined with the lack of armories for teams to compete in during a planned playoff tournament for the ABL led to the league scrapping the ABL playoffs entirely this time around (which would be somewhat similar to what happened in their 1941–42 season), with the Scranton Miners being crowned the two-time champions of the ABL following this decision. This failure by the ABL's hands would help further lead to the ABL's decline and then conclusion that happened in the 1950s decade, as well as help lead to the Paterson Crescents leaving the ABL by the end of this season alongside the aforementioned Utica Pros, though it's suggested that the Utica Pros would become the Elmira Colonels instead.

== Notes ==
^{a} The Wilkes-Barre Barons withdrew from the ABL this season on February 22, 1951 (a fair amount of time before the planned ABL playoffs were meant to begin) following a $1,500 bond demand from the Scranton Miners.
^{b} The Utica Pros were named the replacement team to enter what would have been the 1951 ABL Playoffs had they been able to begin properly, with Utica being the (new) #4 seed for the season while the Bridgeport Aer-A-Sols were named the new #3 seed instead of being the #4 seed and the Paterson Crescents were named the new #2 seed instead of being the #3 seed for this season.
^{c} The Allentown Aces moved from Allentown, Pennsylvania (though some home games were played in Bethlehem, Pennsylvania instead) to nearby Carbondale, Pennsylvania during the season on December 28, 1950, following a 1–12 start to their season to become the Carbondale Aces for the rest of the season.
