= 1947–48 Jersey City Atoms / Scranton Miners season =

American Basketball League season

- League: American Basketball League (revived original)
- Head coach: Bernie Fliegel (8–9); Red Wallace (8–7)
- General manager: Moe Longo? (Jersey City) (Scranton)
- Owner(s): Moe Longo? (Jersey City); Joe "Speed" Maloney (Scranton)
- Arena: Jersey City Armory (Jersey City); Union City Armory(?); Scranton Armory (Scranton)

Results
- Record: 16–16 (.500)
- Place: Conference: 4th
- Playoff finish: The Scranton Miners lost the ABL semifinals 2-0 to the Paterson Crescents.

The 1947–48 Jersey City Atoms / Scranton Miners season was the second (and technically final) season of the Jersey City Atoms franchise from Jersey City, New Jersey and the first season of the team playing with their much more well known Scranton Miners name in Scranton, Pennsylvania in the revived (yet weakened up) form of the American Basketball League. Originally, they started out this season while competing under their original Jersey City Atoms name, but they first moved out to nearby Union City, New Jersey on January 16, 1948 (though it doesn't appear that the Atoms changed their name to the Union City Atoms or even Union City Miners at the time) before moving out to nearby Scranton twelve days later to become the Scranton Miners for the rest of their existence while in the ABL. In any case, the Atoms turned Miners would originally be one of eight teams competing in the ABL this season before the quick departure of the Lancaster (Red) Roses saw the league drop down to seven competitive teams for the rest of the season. Unlike the previous season, the Atoms turned Miners would finish this season with an average 16–16 record, which put them ahead of the withdrawn Lancaster (Red) Roses, Brooklyn Gothams, Philadelphia SPHAs, and the Elizabeth Braves turned Hartford Hurricanes, but behind the defending ABL champion Trenton Tigers, the Paterson Crescents, and the inaugural EPBL champion Wilkes-Barre Barons for a fourth-place finish. This average performance would lead to them entering the ABL Playoffs once again, this time going up against the upstart Crescents this time around. Unfortunately for the rebranded Miners, the talent gap between them and Paterson's improved team would be too much for them this time around, as Scranton would be swept in the semifinal round by their nearby rivals.

== Roster ==
Due to information on American Basketball League players being generally hard to find (especially by the time the ABL was designated more as a minor league during its later years of existence), there are bound to be more gaps and/or inaccuracies found in certain areas on the team's roster spots than usual.

1947–48 Jersey City Atoms / Scranton Miners roster
Players

Pos.	No.	Player	Height	Weight	DOB	From
G/F		Ace Abbott	6 ft 1 in (1.85 m)	190 lb (86 kg)	1917-03-20	CCNY
G		Red Allen	6 ft 1 in (1.85 m)	180 lb (82 kg)	1922	St. John's
		George Babich			1920-12-03	Fordham
		Milt Breenberg			1923-09-25	CCNY
G		Saul Cohen	5 ft 10 in (1.78 m)	160 lb (73 kg)	1921-04-22	Long Island
G		Norm Drucker	5 ft 10 in (1.78 m)		1920-07-04	CCNY
G/F		Moe Dubilier	6 ft 2 in (1.88 m)	210 lb (95 kg)	1915-02-20	John Marshall University
F/C		Bob Fitzgerald	6 ft 5 in (1.96 m)	190 lb (86 kg)	1923-03-14	Seton Hall
F/C		Pop Goodwin	6 ft 2 in (1.88 m)	203 lb (92 kg)	1920-12-20	St. John's Prep (NY)
		Tony Karpowich			1919-08-20	Fordham
G		Ed Kassler	6 ft 2 in (1.88 m)		1923-07-21	Long Island
C		Don Kotter	6 ft 7 in (2.01 m)	195 lb (88 kg)	1920-12-29	Long Island
G/F		Roy Leenig	6 ft 1 in (1.85 m)	170 lb (77 kg)	1920-08-22	Memorial HS (NJ)
		Artie Lockheed			1921-03-04	St. Francis Brooklyn
G/F		Johnny Macknowski	6 ft 0 in (1.83 m)	180 lb (82 kg)	1923-01-07	Seton Hall
G		Bernard Opper	6 ft 0 in (1.83 m)	185 lb (84 kg)	1915-09-01	Kentucky
G		Ben Pagliaroli			1921-11-29	Seton Hall
G		Ben Pasch	6 ft 2 in (1.88 m)	190 lb (86 kg)	1920-08-01	John Marshall
F		Hank Rosenstein	6 ft 4 in (1.93 m)	185 lb (84 kg)	1920-06-16	CCNY
G		Lou Simon	5 ft 11 in (1.80 m)	155 lb (70 kg)	1916-02-13	Long Island
G		Sid Tanenbaum	6 ft 0 in (1.83 m)	160 lb (73 kg)	1925-10-08	NYU
G		Joey Thomas	5 ft 8 in (1.73 m)	155 lb (70 kg)	1919-11-12	Scranton
G		Vince Verdeschi	6 ft 2 in (1.88 m)		1925-03-24	Long Island
G		Red Wallace	6 ft 1 in (1.85 m)	185 lb (84 kg)	1918-07-12	Scranton
	4	Red Walsh			1924-03-17	No college
G		Tony Zaycek	5 ft 10 in (1.78 m)	155 lb (70 kg)	1916-07-06	Seton Hall

Coaches
Head coach

Bernie Fliegel
Red Wallace

Legend
- (DP) Unsigned draft pick
- (FA) Free agent
- (S) Suspended
- Injured

Note: It's currently unknown who not only played for the team while they were in Jersey City and who played for them while they were in Scranton (and even who briefly played for the team while they were out in Union City), but also who was on the team's playoff roster for the season when they played as the Scranton Miners there.

== Standings ==
Due to the decreased number of teams this season, the ABL would remove divisions from their league this season going forward after previously using them for their previous season of play.

Pos.	Team	Wins	Losses	Win %
1	Wilkes-Barre Barons	26	8	.765
2	Paterson Crescents	19	16	.543
3	Trenton Tigers	17	15	.531
4	Jersey City Atoms / Scranton Miners^{[a]}	16	16	.500
5	Elizabeth Braves / Hartford Hurricanes^{[b]}	11	12	.478
6	Philadelphia SPHAs	13	19	.406
7	Brooklyn Gothams	8	20	.286
8	Lancaster (Red) Roses^{[c]}	1	5	.167

== Playoffs ==
=== Semifinals ===
(4) Scranton Miners vs. (2) Paterson Crescents: Paterson wins series 2–0

- Game 1: March 27, 1948 @ Paterson: Paterson 82, Scranton 68
- Game 2: March 28, 1948 @ Scranton: Paterson 92, Scranton 66

== Notes ==
^{a} Originally, the Jersey City Atoms would move from Jersey City, New Jersey to nearby Union City, New Jersey on January 16, 1948 (though it doesn't appear that the Jersey City Atoms rebranded their team by this point in time) before moving again to Scranton, Pennsylvania to become the Scranton Miners twelve days later on January 28, 1948, for the rest of the season going forward.
^{b} The Elizabeth Braves would move from Elizabeth, New Jersey to Hartford, Connecticut on December 19, 1947, to become the Hartford Hurricanes for the rest of the season.
^{c} The Lancaster Roses (sometimes referred to as the Lancaster Red Roses instead) would end up withdrawing their operations from the ABL early in the season on December 4, 1947, to return to the Eastern Professional Basketball League not long afterward.
