= 1952–53 Middletown Guards season =

American basketball season

- League: American Basketball League (revived original)
- Head coach: Jerry Rizzo (player-coach)
- General manager: Jerry Rizzo(?)
- Owner(s): Unknown
- Arena: Middletown Armory

Results
- Record: 2–5 (.286)
- Place: Conference: 6th
- Playoff finish: Did not qualify. (Folded operations on January 8, 1953.)

The 1952–53 Middletown Guards season was technically considered the third and final season of play for the Middletown Guards franchise, as well their only full season of play in Middletown, Connecticut after they previously first started out in Allentown, Pennsylvania as the Allentown Aces before they moved to nearby Carbondale, Pennsylvania to become the Carbondale Aces to end their first season and start out their second season before rebranding themselves to the Carbondale Big Chiefs up until that team technically folded operations and were replaced by the Middletown Guards for the rest of that season in the revived (yet clearly struggling) original version of the American Basketball League. After the Middletown Guards exited from the previous ABL season on February 21, 1952, they would surprisingly end up returning to the ABL as a full-time team for this season going forward into this season. Entering this season, Middletown was meant to be one of eight teams competing in the ABL this season before the season started out with seven teams instead due to the Jersey City Titans dropping out of the league (and almost causing the original cancellation of this ABL season entirely) after they and the Elmira Colonels originally started out their preseason periods with players that had been involved with the 1951 college basketball point-shaving scandal. Unfortunately for the Guards, in what felt like further foreshadowing for what would go down with the ABL itself this season, the team would never gel together under player-coach Jerry Rizzo and the team would still suffer financially. As a result of this structural failure, the Middletown Guards would officially be the first team to fold operations for good this season on January 8, 1953 (while the Scranton Miners originally folded operations on December 20, 1952, they ultimately returned to the ABL with their record intact by January 10, 1953), with Middletown playing in only seven total games for a 2–5 record for an official sixth-place finish due to them still having a better overall record than the Hazleton turned Glen Falls-Saratoga Harlem Yankees.

== Roster ==
Due to information on American Basketball League players being generally hard to find (especially by the time the ABL was designated more as a minor league during its later years of existence), there are bound to be more gaps and/or inaccuracies found in certain areas on the team's roster spots than usual.

| Player | Position(s) |
|---|---|
| Hank Baletti | Unknown |
| Edward Bartels | F |
| Hank Biasetti | G |
| Chico Burrell | Unknown |
| Bill Carlson | Unknown |
| Fran Curran | G |
| Ray Dombrosky | Unknown |
| Matty Forman | Unknown |
| Vic Hanson | G/F |
| Claude Price | Unknown |
| Jerry Rizzo | G |
| Leroy Watkins | Unknown |
| Bill Zirkel | G |

== American Basketball League Standings ==
| Pos. | Team | Wins | Losses | Win % |
|---|---|---|---|---|
| 1 | Manchester British-Americans - z | 19 | 9 | .679 |
| 2 | Wilkes-Barre Barons - x | 20 | 11 | .550 |
| 3 | Elmira Colonels*^{[a]} - x | 17 | 11 | .607 |
| 4 | Scranton Miners*^{[b]} - x | 12 | 11 | .522 |
| 5 | Pawtucket Slaters | 6 | 19 | .240 |
| 6 | Middletown Guards†**^{[c]} | 2 | 5 | .286 |
| 7 | Hazleton / Glen Falls-Saratoga Harlem Yankees†***^{[d]} | 1 | 11 | .083 |

* – Team briefly dropped out of the ABL during the season before returning to the league later on within the season.
** – The Middletown Guards dropped out of the ABL on January 8, 1953, and then disbanded as a franchise two days later on January 10, 1953.
*** – The Hazleton Harlem Yankees started their season out in Hazleton, Pennsylvania before they moved out two games into their season on December 4, 1952, to move back to Saratoga Springs, New York with games also played in Glen Falls, New York to become the Glen Falls-Saratoga Harlem Yankees for the rest of their season up until they ceased operations and withdrew operations on February 6, 1953.
† – Did not survive the ABL season.

== Notes ==
^{a} The Elmira Colonels dropped out of the ABL on October 23, 1952, alongside the Jersey City Titans due to the Colonels having Bill Spivey on their roster at the time (with the Titans having multiple players that were previously a part of the 1951 college basketball point-shaving scandal themselves as well). Initially, the Colonels tried to be an exhibition team for the season, but after a few games, they decided to cut Bill Spivey from their roster in order to return to the ABL and have the league restart their season properly with seven teams playing throughout the season instead of eight teams playing this season.
^{b} The Scranton Miners previously dropped out of the ABL on December 20, 1952, due to original team owner Joe "Speed" Maloney charging other owners with evading the league's minimum guarantee of $300 per game before they reorganized themselves under a new group of management within late December 1952 before returning to the ABL by January 10, 1953, though Scranton would later withdraw operations from the league during the ABL's playoffs (with an impromptu forfeit defeat resulting in the Manchester British-Americans going into the championship round for this season) following a controversial ruling regarding a playoff match held on March 14, 1953.
^{c} The Middletown Guards dropped out of the ABL on January 8, 1953, and then disbanded as a franchise two days later on January 10, 1953.
^{d} The Hazleton Harlem Yankees started their season out in Hazleton, Pennsylvania before they moved out two games into their season on December 4, 1952, to move back to Saratoga Springs, New York with games also played in Glen Falls, New York to become the Glen Falls-Saratoga Harlem Yankees for the rest of their season up until they ceased operations and withdrew operations on February 6, 1953.
