= 1951–52 Carbondale Aces / Middletown Guards season =

American Basketball League season

- League: American Basketball League (revived original)
- Head coach: Red Wallace (Carbondale; 6–7); Bernie Sarachak (Carbondale; 0–1); Joe Wise (Middletown; 1–5)
- General manager: Jim Nolan (Carbondale); Joe Wise? (Middletown)
- Owner(s): Jim Nolan (Carbondale); Unknown (Middletown)
- Arena: Carbondale Armory; Middletown Armory

Results
- Record: 7–13 (.350)
- Place: Conference: 6th/7th/8th
- Playoff finish: Did not qualify. (Carbondale officially folded operations on January 20, 1952, while Middletown ended up withdrawing from the ABL on February 21, 1952.)

The 1951–52 Carbondale Aces / Middletown Guards season was officially considered the second professional basketball season of play for this uniquely operated franchise, as well their final season of play as the Carbondale Aces (who might have later become the Carbondale Big Chiefs) in Carbondale, Pennsylvania and their only season of play as the rebranded Carbondale Big Chiefs while still operating in Carbondale before the team technically folded operations on January 20, 1952, and were soon replaced by the Middletown Guards from Middletown, Connecticut before they technically ended up withdrawing for the rest of the season on February 21, 1952, in the revived (yet clearly struggling) original version of the American Basketball League. Entering this season, this team would be one of seven (later eight) teams competing in the ABL throughout the season, though it would devolve downward to only six remaining teams by the end of the season. While Carbondale would start out a lot better than they did in their inaugural season at first by getting a 5–3 record to start out this season, the team would end up having trouble drawing fans in the city of Carbondale, regardless of whether they were named the Aces or the Big Chiefs. As a result of that significant problem, they would end up struggling not long afterward, with player-coach Red Wallace being fired and briefly replaced by former Scranton Miners head coach Bernie Sarachak for a game before Carbondale's squad ended up folding operations on January 24, 1952, with a 6–8. However, not long after that, the Middletown Guards would enter the ABL as the replacement team for Carbondale for the rest of the season (with Joe Wise being the new head coach and Frank Lewis being the only player remaining from the previous Carbondale roster), with Middletown performing very poorly for the rest of the season (ultimately finishing their season with a 1–5 record) before ultimately dropping out of the league (under a brief basis) on February 21, 1952, for an official 7th/8th place overall finish, depending on whether one counts the forced dropout of the former BAA/NBA Washington Capitols team here (with Carbondale's record being good enough to warrant a sixth-place finish in this case). Interestingly, despite them dropping out of the ABL late in the season, the Middletown Guards would end up returning to the league for what would end up becoming its final season of existence not long afterward.

== Rosters ==
Due to information on American Basketball League players being generally hard to find (especially by the time the ABL was designated more as a minor league during its later years of existence), there are bound to be more gaps and/or inaccuracies found in certain areas on the team's roster spots than usual.

== Carbondale Aces (/ Big Chiefs) Roster ==
Player	Position(s)
Syl Bozinski	Unknown
Bill Chanecka	Unknown
Pete Clark	Unknown
Ray Ellefson	C
George Feigenbaum	G
Dick Hammock	Unknown
Ted Hanauer	Unknown
Nick Kitik	Unknown
Frank Lewis	Unknown
Bob McGrane	Unknown
Cas Ostrowski	G
Bill Pless	F/C
Herb Scherer	C
Wally Sheil	G
Andy Skvoretz	Unknown
Tom Smith	PG/SG
Red Wallace	G
Mike Yelovich	Unknown
Eddie Younger	PG

Note: In addition to all of those players, Carbondale's team(s) would briefly include unknown players with the last names of Cravath (or Cravaths), Grasnicka, and Yellis (who's likely considered to be Mike Yelovich outside of a potential possibility of being Joe Yelovich) that were on Carbondale's team(s) specifically as well. Not only that, but they also might have had Wally Sebrowski play in Carbondale in the event he didn't play for Middletown this season.

== Middletown Guards Roster ==
Player	Position(s)
Al "Italo" Ablondi	G
Ike Borsavage	C/F
Ed Chenetz	Unknown
Walt Cibrowski	Unknown
Fran Curran	G
Ray Dombrosky	Unknown
Dick Hammock	G/F
Vic Hanson	G/F
Dick Holub	C
Frank Lewis	Unknown
Fred Lewis	G/F
Larry Lohneiss	Unknown
Paul Lynner	Unknown
Frank Martello	Unknown
Tom Muller	Unknown
Tom Sauren	Unknown
Norm Skinner	Unknown
Arnold Smith	Unknown
Mort Stagoff	Unknown
Charley Wexler	Unknown

Note: In addition to them, there was also an unknown player with the last name of Loheniss (who's likely suggested to be Larry Lohneiss) that was briefly on the team as well. Not only that, but they also might have had Wally Sebrowski play in Middletown in the event he didn't play for Carbondale this season. Interestingly, Frank Lewis would be the only (known) player that would play for both the Carbondale and Middletown rosters for this season.

== American Basketball League Standings ==
Pos.	Team	Wins	Losses	Win %
1	Scranton Miners - z	24	11	.686
2	Elmira Colonels - x	22	18	.550
3	Wilkes-Barre Barons - x	20	19	.513
4	Saratoga Harlem Yankees / Schenectady Yankees / Saratoga Harlem Yankees*^{[a]} - x	12	16	.429
5	Manchester British-Americans**^{[b]}	8	11	.421
6	Bridgeport Roesslers	9	22	.290
7	Washington Capitols†^{[c]}	15	7	.682
8	Carbondale Aces(/Carbondale Big Chiefs)/Middletown Guards†***^{[d]}	7	13	.350

* – The Schenectady Yankees originally moved out of Saratoga, New York to nearby Schenectady, New York on January 15, 1952, to become the Schenectady Harlem Yankees for a few games before moving back to Saratoga for the rest of their season on February 5, 1952.
** – The Manchester British-Americans joined the ABL's season on New Year's Day in 1952 after previously playing their season in Connecticut's Eastern Basketball League.
*** – According to Total Basketball: The Ultimate Basketball Encyclopedia, the Carbondale Aces might have changed their team name to the Carbondale Big Chiefs at some point during the season. Regardless of whether the Aces did do that or not, the Carbondale franchise would ultimately end up folding their operations on January 20, 1952, with their original 6–8 record being picked up by the Middletown Guards, who ended up going 1–5 on their ends for a combined 7–13 record before they ended up dropping out of the ABL themselves on February 21, 1952.
† – Did not survive the ABL season.

== Notes ==
^{a} The Schenectady Yankees originally moved out of Saratoga, New York to nearby Schenectady, New York on January 15, 1952, to become the Schenectady Harlem Yankees for a few games before moving back to Saratoga for the rest of their season on February 5, 1952.
^{b} The Manchester British-Americans joined the ABL's season on New Year's Day in 1952 after previously playing their season in Connecticut's Eastern Basketball League.
^{c} The Washington Capitols in the ABL this season would be the same team that previously folded operations from the NBA in their 1950–51 season. However, the Capitols would fold operations on January 11, 1952 (this time, folding operations for good despite their 15–7 record at the time) due to the NBA threatening to sue the Capitols team and the ABL alike if the Capitols team were to use the same team history as the former BAA/NBA team despite the Washington Capitols technically having history with the ABL first due to them existing as a team in 1944 before becoming the Paterson Crescents in 1945.
^{d} According to Total Basketball: The Ultimate Basketball Encyclopedia, the Carbondale Aces might have changed their team name to the Carbondale Big Chiefs at some point during the season. Regardless of whether the Aces did do that or not, the Carbondale franchise would ultimately end up folding their operations on January 20, 1952, with their original 6–8 record being picked up by the Middletown Guards, who ended up going 1–5 on their ends for a combined 7–13 record before they ended up dropping out of the ABL themselves on February 21, 1952.
