= 1946–47 Jersey City Atoms season =

American Basketball League season

- League: American Basketball League (revived original)
- Head coach: Lenny Burns (6–11); Moe Longo (2–3); Paulie Adamo (5–8)
- General manager: Moe Longo
- Owner(s): Moe Longo(?)
- Arena: Jersey City Armory

Results
- Record: 14–22 (.389)
- Place: Division: 2nd (Northern)
- Playoff finish: Lost ABL Quarterfinals 2-1 to the Philadelphia SPHAs

The 1946–47 Jersey City Atoms season was the inaugural season of the Jersey City Atoms from Jersey City, New Jersey in the revived form of the American Basketball League. Entering this season, the Atoms would be involved with the ABL's biggest point of existence in its entire overall history as an expansion franchise for this season, with ten total teams competing in the newly created Northern and Southern divisions (instead of using the typical Eastern and Western divisions like the ABL had done back in the 1927–28 season), with five teams (including Jersey City) being in the Northern Division and five teams being in the Southern Division. Similar to how most teams in the ABL would perform this season (due in part to their decision to schedule most of their games on the weekend period of time due to their players being paid well in their regular jobs outside of the ABL instead of trying to compete against both of the rivaling National Basketball League and the newly created Basketball Association of America in that regard), the Atoms would end up struggling throughout the season due to the constant roster turnover that they would have to deal with. As a result of that, Jersey City would end their season with a below-average 14–22 record for a surprisingly high second-place finish in the Northern Division that put them behind only the Brooklyn Gothams (who were the only team to have a winning record in that division), though unlike most struggling teams in the league, the Atoms would end up qualifying for the quarterfinal round of the ABL Playoffs to go up against the #2 seeded team of the Southern Division, the long-standing Philadelphia SPHAs, due to the unique formatting for this season's playoffs. Surprisingly for Jersey City, they would end up splitting their first two games played with Philadelphia in the quarterfinal round. However, the SPHAs would end up getting home court advantage for the quarterfinal round, which led to them winning the decisive third and final game played in the series over the Atoms to eliminate them in the playoffs, with Philadelphia later being eliminated from the semifinals (and later, the championship series that never happened properly) by the eventual (controversial) champions in the #3 seeded (Southern Division) team known as the Trenton Tigers.

== Roster ==
Due to information on American Basketball League players being generally hard to find (especially by the time the ABL was designated more as a minor league during its later years of existence), there are bound to be more gaps and/or inaccuracies found in certain areas on the team's roster spots than usual.

1946–47 Jersey City Atoms roster
Players

| Pos. | No. | Player | Height | Weight | DOB | From |
|---|---|---|---|---|---|---|
| | | George Babich | | | 1920-12-03 | Fordham |
| G | | Tom Baer | 5 ft 5 in (1.65 m) | | 1918-05-06 | St. John's |
| C | | Slim Bornemann | 6 ft 7 in (2.01 m) | | 1921-08-22 | Emerson HS (NJ) |
| F/C | | Bill Bornheimer | 6 ft 3 in (1.91 m) | 225 lb (102 kg) | 1921-11-25 | Georgetown |
| F | | Dan Christie | 6 ft 2 in (1.88 m) | 200 lb (91 kg) | 1920-11-19 | Manhattan |
| | | Von Derlinde | | | Unknown | Unknown |
| C | | Bobby Dorn | 6 ft 5 in (1.96 m) | 200 lb (91 kg) | 1920-06-21 | Temple |
| | | Hal Dorn | | | 1923-10-24 | Memorial HS (NJ) |
| | | Pat Finnegan | | | 1921-09-18 | Fordham |
| F/C | | Bernie Fliegel | 6 ft 3 in (1.91 m) | 195 lb (88 kg) | 1913-05-13 | CCNY |
| G | | Mel Ginzburg | 6 ft 1 in (1.85 m) | | 1920-11-30 | Curtis HS (NY) |
| F | | Jerry Kelly | 6 ft 2 in (1.88 m) | 172 lb (78 kg) | 1918-06-14 | Marshall |
| G/F | | Roy Leenig | 6 ft 1 in (1.85 m) | 170 lb (77 kg) | 1920-08-22 | Memorial HS (NJ) |
| | | Bobby Lewis | | | 1918-04-28 | NYU |
| | | Frank Licitra | | | 1920-05-07 | Abraham Lincoln HS (NY) |
| | | Artie Lockheed | | | 1921-03-04 | St. Francis Brooklyn |
| G/F | | Herb Maack | 6 ft 2 in (1.88 m) | 210 lb (95 kg) | 1917-04-16 | Columbia |
| | | John Marty | | | 1919? | Unknown |
| G | | Vinnie Michaels | 5 ft 6 in (1.68 m) | 130 lb (59 kg) | 1920-07-28 | Seton Hall |
| G | | Bernie Rutledge | | | 1923-10-01 | Notre Dame |
| G/F | | Charlie Schmidli | 6 ft 2 in (1.88 m) | 185 lb (84 kg) | 1920-08-20 | Georgetown |
| G | | Lou Simon | 5 ft 11 in (1.80 m) | 155 lb (70 kg) | 1916-02-13 | Long Island |
| F/C | | George Syby | 6 ft 3 in (1.91 m) | 215 lb (98 kg) | 1915-11-26 | Long Island |
| G | | Nat Volpe | 5 ft 8 in (1.73 m) | 155 lb (70 kg) | 1916-05-15 | Manhattan |

Coaches
Head coach

John Donlon

Legend
- (DP) Unsigned draft pick
- (FA) Free agent
- (S) Suspended
- Injured

Note: In addition to them, there was also an unknown player with the last name of Palmeri (who has a few possibilities on his end) and an unknown player with the last name of Van Der Linden (who might potentially be Leonard Vonder Linden) that was briefly on the team as well. Not only that, but there was also a player who was labeled as "R. Louis" at the time as well, though he's suggested to likely be Bobby Lewis in this case instead. However, there's currently no known idea of what the final roster for this team was during the ABL Playoffs this season.

== American Basketball League Season Standings ==
Due to the number of teams in the ABL this season, this would mark the first time since the 1927–28 season where the ABL would utilize divisions within their league in a proper manner, though unlike that season, the ABL would utilize a Northern Division (which the Atoms competed in) and a Southern Division instead of the typical Eastern Division and Western Division that had been on display for most other professional leagues at the time.

=== Northern Division ===
| Pos. | Team | Wins | Losses | Win % |
|---|---|---|---|---|
| 1 | Brooklyn Gothams - y | 24 | 10 | .706 |
| 2 | Jersey City Atoms - x | 14 | 22 | .389 |
| 3 | Troy Celtics | 13 | 22 | .371 |
| 4 | Paterson Crescents | 11 | 23 | .324 |
| 5 | Newark Bobcats / Kingston Chiefs / Yonkers Chiefs^{a} † | 7 | 17 | .292 |

† – Did not survive the ABL season.

=== Southern Division ===
| Pos. | Team | Wins | Losses | Win % |
|---|---|---|---|---|
| 1 | Baltimore Bullets - z | 31 | 3 | .919 |
| 2 | Philadelphia Sphas - x | 19 | 14 | .675 |
| 3 | Trenton Tigers - x | 17 | 17 | .500 |
| 4 | Elizabeth Braves - x | 15 | 18 | .455 |
| 5 | Wilmington Bombers | 15 | 20 | .429 |

== American Basketball League Playoffs ==
Due to the larger number of teams entering this season (the most in one ABL season, in fact), the ABL would set up a newer, larger playoff format for this season, with the intent of it involving "[t]he first team in each division will play in a series of the best three out of five games; the second place clubs in each division will play in a preliminary playoff series of the best two out of three games; the third and fourth place clubs in the official standing of the league at the termination of the 1946–1947 season, regardless of the division in which they are entered by computed on their percentage rating, will play in a preliminary series of the best two out of three games." Because of it, the newly created quarterfinal round that would only appear in this season would have the Jersey City Atoms (the #2 seeded Northern Division team) going up against the Philadelphia Sphas (the #2 seeded Southern Division team) in a best-of-three series.

=== American Basketball League Quarterfinals ===
(2N) Jersey City Atoms Vs. (2S) Philadelphia Sphas: Philadelphia wins series 2–1

- Game 1: March 13, 1947 @ Philadelphia: Philadelphia 56, Jersey City 47
- Game 2: March 16, 1947 @ Jersey City: Jersey City 67, Philadelphia 60
- Game 3: March 20, 1947 @ Philadelphia: Philadelphia 56, Jersey City 50

== Notes ==
^{a} The Newark Bobcats first transferred their franchise from Newark, New Jersey to Kingston, New York on December 23, 1946 (though they did not necessarily change their team name at the time (but if they did, they would have changed it to the Kingston Chiefs instead)) and then moved to nearby Yonkers, New York to become the Yonkers Chiefs on January 22, 1947, before folding operations entirely by the middle of February in 1947.
