= 1950–51 Utica Pros season =

American Basketball League season

- League: American Basketball League (revived original)
- Head coach: Leroy Chollet (16–18); Chuck Harmon (1–4)
- General manager: Leroy Chollet(?); Chuck Harmon(?)
- Arena: Utica Armory

Results
- Record: 17–22 (.436)
- Place: Conference: 4th/5th
- Playoff finish: Aborted ABL Playoffs (Did not want to compete against the defending ABL champion Scranton Miners while competing as the replacement #4 seed in the originally planned for 1951 ABL Playoffs. (Scranton were later named the default ABL champions for the season.))

The 1950–51 Utica Pros season was officially considered the first and only season of play for the Utica Pros from Utica, New York in the revived (yet struggling) original version of the American Basketball League. After previously failing to acquire the Philadelphia SPHAs during the 1949–50 ABL season (with them going to Abe Saperstein as a part of the Harlem Globetrotters entourage instead), the Pros would be created in the 1950–51 season as an expansion team as an attempt to help give the city of Utica greater exposure in the sporting world. Entering this season, Utica would be one of seven teams competing for the ABL's championship this time around, though the ABL would end up seeing a chain reaction occur near the end of the season where, due in part to the Pros' involvement in said chain reaction, the league wouldn't be able to have a proper playoff series occur on their ends for this season. Throughout the majority of the season, the Pros would see themselves get a below-average record with former NBA player(-coach) Leroy Chollet from the Syracuse Nationals coaching the team for most of the season before being replaced by player-coach Chuck Harmon (an African American Major League Baseball player) for the rest of the season once Cholett returned to the Nationals that season. Originally, the Pros were not supposed to qualify for the ABL Playoffs due to them having a below-average 17–22 record for a fifth-place finish that put them ahead of only the Allentown turned Carbondale Aces and the Saratoga Harlem Yankees while being behind the Bridgeport Aer-A-Sols, Paterson Crescents, Wilkes-Barre Barons, and defending champion Scranton Miners. However, due to Wilkes-Barre surprisingly dropping out of the ABL this season on February 22, 1951, due to a $1,500 bond demand from Scranton, Utica would be given a sudden rise up in official standings from fifth to fourth to officially qualify for the ABL Playoffs this season. Unfortunately for them, due to the combination of Utica not wanting to compete against the defending champion Scranton Miners in the semifinal round (likely since they felt they could compete a lot more efficiently against the new #2 seeded Paterson Crescents instead) and both Bridgeport and Paterson not having viable armories be available to them for postseason play this time around, the ABL made the difficult decision to cancel the ABL Playoffs altogether this time around, which subsequently led to them declaring the Scranton Miners as repeat champions of the ABL for this season due to them having the best record of the regular season. Following this season's conclusion, the Utica Pros would be replaced by the Elmira Colonels from nearby Elmira, New York for the rest of the league's existence.

== Roster ==
Due to information on American Basketball League players being generally hard to find (especially by the time the ABL was designated more as a minor league during its later years of existence), there are bound to be more gaps and/or inaccuracies found in certain areas on the team's roster spots than usual.

Player	Position(s)
Greek Athas	G
Leroy Banks	Unknown
Edward Bartels	F
Gerry Calabrese	G
Leroy Chollet	F
Ray Corley	G
Harry Foley	Unknown
Jerry Fowler	C
Chuck Harmon	G
Bob Healey	Unknown
Al Henningsen	F
Don Lofgran	F/C
Bob MacKinnon	G
Al Masino	G
Dave Miller	Unknown
Mike Novak	C/F
Dermie O'Connell	G
Bob Roper	Unknown
Johnny Rucker	Unknown
Dick Smuin	Unknown
Ed Stanczak	F

== American Basketball League Standings ==
Pos.	Team	Wins	Losses	Win %
1	Scranton Miners	28	8	.778
2	Wilkes-Barre Barons^{×}^{[a]}	28	11	.718
3	Paterson Crescents	21	16	.568
4	Bridgeport Aer-A-Sols	18	15	.545
5	Utica Pros^{[b]}	17	22	.436
6	Saratoga Harlem Yankees	5	25	.167
7	Allentown / Carbondale Aces^{[c]}	4	24	.105

× – Withdrew from the ABL this season on February 22, 1951, following a $1,500 bond demand from the Scranton Miners.
* – The Allentown Aces moved from Allentown, Pennsylvania to nearby Carbondale, Pennsylvania during the season on December 28, 1950, following a 1–12 start to their season.

== Aborted American Basketball League Playoffs ==
Originally, the ABL intended to have a proper playoff series occur with the best four teams in the league competing against each other in something similar to what the formerly rivaling National Basketball League had done in certain seasons without divisions at hand where the best four teams of the season would compete against each other (in this case, had the Wilkes-Barre Barons not left the ABL left in the season, it would have had the defending ABL champion Scranton Miners competing against the recently rebranded Bridgeport Aer-A-Sols and the Wilkes-Barre Barons would have competed against the Paterson Crescents for this season). However, because Wilkes-Barre unexpectedly withdrew from the ABL late in the season on February 22, 1951, due to a $1,500 bond demand from Scranton themselves, the planned ABL playoffs had Scranton going up against the new Utica Pros expansion team (who took on the fourth place spot in the ABL officially for this season) and the Paterson Crescents would go up against the Bridgeport Aer-A-Sols as the new #2 Vs. #3 seeded match-up. However, before the ABL playoffs were planned to begin, Utica voted to not participate in the planned (alternative) playoff set-up against Scranton; that surprising vote combined with the lack of armories for teams to compete in during a planned playoff tournament for the ABL (specifically for both Bridgeport and Paterson) led to the league scrapping the ABL playoffs entirely this time around (which would be somewhat similar to what happened in their 1941–42 season), with the Scranton Miners being crowned the two-time champions of the ABL following this decision. This failure by the ABL's hands would help further lead to the ABL's decline and then conclusion that happened in the 1950s decade, as well as help lead to the Paterson Crescents leaving the ABL by the end of this season alongside the aforementioned Utica Pros, though it's suggested that the Utica Pros would become the Elmira Colonels instead.

== Notes ==
^{a} The Wilkes-Barre Barons withdrew from the ABL this season on February 22, 1951 (a fair amount of time before the planned ABL playoffs were meant to begin) following a $1,500 bond demand from the Scranton Miners.
^{b} The Utica Pros were named the replacement team to enter what would have been the 1951 ABL Playoffs had they been able to begin properly, with Utica being the (new) #4 seed for the season while the Bridgeport Aer-A-Sols were named the new #3 seed instead of being the #4 seed and the Paterson Crescents were named the new #2 seed instead of being the #3 seed for this season.
^{c} The Allentown Aces moved from Allentown, Pennsylvania to nearby Carbondale, Pennsylvania during the season on December 28, 1950, following a 1–12 start to their season to become the Carbondale Aces for the rest of the season.
