= Jack Laub =

American basketball player and pharmaceutical executive (1926–2023)

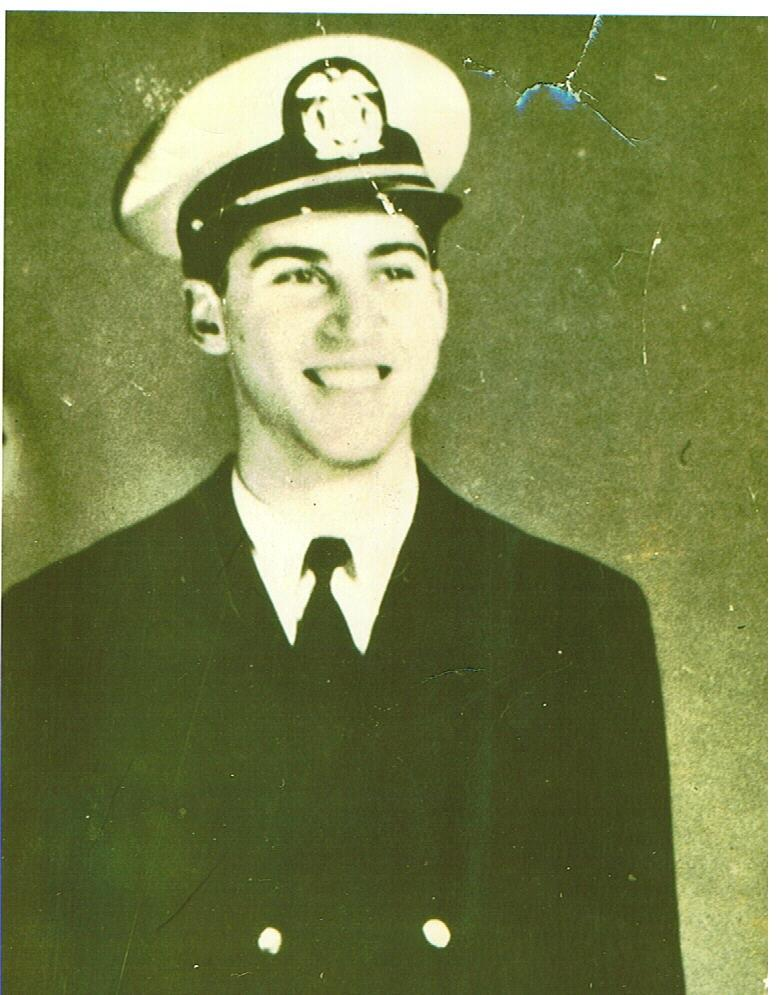
Jack Laub in military uniform

Jack Laub (May 9, 1926 – June 29, 2023) was an American professional basketball player and pharmaceutical executive best known as the only NCAA player to ever play six varsity years. He is a recipient of the French Legion of Honor for his military service in World War II, and an inductee to the National Jewish Sports Hall of Fame, the City College of New York Basketball Hall of Fame, the University of Cincinnati's James P. Kelly Athletics Hall of Fame and the Brooklyn Jewish Hall of Fame. He was also a pioneer in the development of generic drugs and is recognized for his commitment to reducing the cost of prescription drugs for consumers.

== Early years ==
Laub was born in Brighton Beach, New York in 1926. He lived with his parents and five brothers in a flat above Laub's, a kosher restaurant his family opened after immigrating to the U.S. from Poland to escape persecution. He attended Abraham Lincoln High School in Brooklyn, New York, where he played on the varsity basketball team and graduated with honors in 1943. Laub was the first Abraham Lincoln graduate to be drafted into the NBA, and he is succeeded by other notable NBA players to graduate from that school, including Stephon Marbury and Sebastian Telfair.

== College career ==
Laub's college basketball career spanned two colleges and was interrupted by his military service during World War II. While the NCAA typically granted only four years of eligibility, an exception was made for veterans whose eligibility was interrupted by their military services. Consequently, he is the only player in NCAA history to play for a total of six varsity years.

=== City College, 1943–1945 ===
After graduating from Abraham Lincoln High School in 1943, Laub enrolled at City College of New York. From 1943 to 1945, he played for two varsity years under legendary City College coach Nat Holman.

Laub was recognized for his contributions to City College basketball with an Honorable Mention Award from the NY City All-Stars, and his election to the City College of New York Basketball Hall of Fame in 2002.

=== Military service in WWII, 1944–1946 ===
Upon graduating from City College in 1944, Laub served in the Merchant Marine during World War II, where he was commissioned as Ensign Officer in Maritime Service, and was later discharged as a Lieutenant of Senior Grade. In October 1946, he served as a Staff Officer for the U.S. Coast Guard.

In 2011, Laub was conferred the honor of "Chevalier" of the French Legion of Honor, in recognition of his contribution to the United States’ crucial role in the liberation of France during World War II.

=== University of Cincinnati, 1946–1950 ===
In 1946, Laub was awarded a basketball scholarship at the University of Cincinnati, where he played with the Bearcats for four varsity years, making him the only player in NCAA to play for a total of six varsity years. In Cincinnati, he became known as the "Black Cat" because of his dark hair, defensive crouch and quick reflexes. Laub was considered one of the team's best shooters, helping the Bearcats win four conference championships and gain a reputation as one of the top teams in the country.

=== Refused to throw games in point shaving scandal ===
In 1951, several college basketball teams were involved in a point-shaving scandal that was at that time considered the biggest scandal in the history of college sports. The scandal primarily centered on players at City College of New York who accepted bribes to fix games by preventing their teams from covering a point spread. Several players were indicted for their participation.

In January 1952, as the point-shaving scandal was spreading to other schools in New York and the Midwest, sports promoter Sam D. Feinberg was accused of attempting, unsuccessfully, to bribe Laub and Alvin Rubenstein, another University of Cincinnati player, to throw games during the 1948–1949 and 1949–1950 seasons. Assistant District Attorney Vincent O’Connor praised Laub and Rubenstein for turning down the bribes. Sam Feinberg's half-brother Saul Feinberg was indicted for bribing players at the University of Kentucky and Bradley University in Peoria, Illinois.

== NBA career, 1950–1952 ==
In 1950, Laub was drafted by the Baltimore Bullets, becoming one of the first two University of Cincinnati players to be drafted into the NBA. During his NBA career, he also played for the Minneapolis Lakers and Scranton Miners. While Laub was with the Miners, he helped the team win two regular season championships from 1951 to 1952.

== Coaching career ==
In 1951, Laub was appointed University of Cincinnati's first assistant basketball coach and later became its head scout. He is credited with recommending the team give a scholarship to NBA Hall of Fame player Jack Twyman and the recruitment of Oscar Robertson. In 1951, with Laub's help, the Bearcats made their first appearance at the National Invitation Tournament.

In 1959, at age 32, he became the head coach of the U.S. Kings Point Merchant Marine Academy.

== Pharmaceutical career ==
In 1954, Laub left basketball to join Pfizer, where he began a long and notable career in pharmaceuticals. Laub is chiefly recognized for his commitment to reducing the cost of prescription drugs through generic drugs and purchasing plans. He also helped open the first discounted drug store chain in the New York area and established the first mail-order pharmacy in New York.

In May 2010, the McMicken College of Arts & Sciences at the University of Cincinnati honored Laub with the Distinguished Alumni Award for his contribution to the reduction of prescription drug costs for consumers, hospitals and insurance companies in the US.

== Death ==
Laub died at his home in Florida on June 29, 2023, at the age of 97.

== Awards and recognition ==
In 2002, Laub was inducted into the City College of New York Basketball Hall of Fame.

In May 2010, the McMicken College of Arts & Sciences at the University of Cincinnati honored Laub with the Distinguished Alumni Award for his contribution to the reduction of prescription drug costs for consumers, hospitals and insurance companies in the US.

In 2011, Laub was conferred the honor of "Chevalier" of the French Legion of Honor, in recognition of his contribution to the United States’ crucial role in the liberation of France during World War II.

In 2012, Laub funded a scholarship to the Florida Atlantic University (FAU) Charles E. Schmidt College of Medicine for medical students interested in breast cancer research. Laub is an active supporter of breast cancer research and pilot studies, in part because he lost two wives to the disease.

In September 2014, he was inducted into the National Jewish Sports Hall of Fame and Museum for his contributions to basketball.

In November 2016, Laub was inducted into the James P. Kelly University of Cincinnati Athletics Hall of Fame and the Brooklyn Jewish Hall of Fame.
