= Harold Hunter (basketball) =

American basketball player and coach (1926–2013)

Personal information
- Born: April 30, 1926 Kansas City, Kansas, U.S.
- Died: March 7, 2013 (aged 86) Hendersonville, Tennessee, U.S.

Career information
- High school: Sumner (Kansas City, Kansas)
- College: North Carolina Central
- NBA draft: 1950: 10th round
- Drafted by: Washington Capitols
- Position: Guard
- Coaching career: 1950–1991

Career history

Coaching
- 1950–1951: Williston School
- 1952–1954: P. S. Jones HS
- 1954–1957: Williston School
- 1957–1959: Tennessee State (assistant)
- 1959–1968: Tennessee State
- 1974–1977: Xavier (LA)
- 1980s: Dillard (assistant)
- 1986–1991: Southern

Career highlights
- No. 35 jersey retired by North Carolina Central

Harold Hunter Sr. (April 30, 1926 – March 7, 2013) was an American basketball coach and player. He became the first African American to sign a professional contract with a National Basketball Association (NBA) team when he joined the Washington Capitols on April 26, 1950. Hunter was cut from the team during training camp and never played for an NBA team. He later coached basketball for the United States men's national basketball team, Tennessee State University, and the U.S. Olympic basketball team.

== Early life ==
Hunter was born on April 30, 1926, in Kansas City, Kansas. He graduated from Sumner High School, later known as Sumner Academy of Arts & Science, in 1944. The school, which had a top ten national ranking in science at the time, was the only all-black high school left in the city. In 2000, a group of Sumner alumni published a book on the history of the school, "The Sumner Story," which focused on Hunter's career.

Hunter played as a guard for North Carolina College in Durham, North Carolina. He is credited with helping the North Carolina Central men's basketball team win the 1950 Colored Intercollegiate Athletic Association Tournament championship and was named the most valuable player of the Central Intercollegiate Athletic Association tournament that year.

In 1984 the university inducted Hunter into its Athletic Hall of Fame. The university also retired his basketball jersey in 2009 to mark the university's centennial. The Central Intercollegiate Athletic Association (CIAA) inducted him into its hall of fame in 1987.

In 1950, Harold Hunter was drafted during the 10th round of the 1950 NBA draft onto the Washington Capitols basketball team. He signed a contract with the Capitols on April 26, 1950, the day after the draft, becoming the first African American player to sign a contract with any NBA basketball team. However, he was cut from the team during the Capitols' training camp and did not play professionally for any NBA team. Ironically enough, Hunter would later sign up with and play for the same Washington Capitols team in question for their 1951–52 season, though that team would end up downgrading into playing for the smaller American Basketball League before later folding operations for good in January 1952 due to law concerns through the NBA holding the legal copyright to the Washington Capitols team and their history.

== Coaching career ==
Hunter coached the boys and girls basketball teams at Williston School in Wilmington, North Carolina, during the 1950–51 season. He served as athletic director and coach of the football, basketball, track and tennis teams at P. S. Jones High School in Washington, North Carolina from 1952 to 1954. Hunter returned to Williston from 1954 to 1957.

Hunter served as an assistant coach for the Tigers basketball team from 1957 to 1959. In 1959, he became the head coach for the Tigers, succeeding outgoing coach John McLendon. He coached the Tigers for nine seasons from 1959 to 1968, leading the team to a 172–67 winning record, including four instances of more than twenty wins in a row. Seventeen of Hunter's Tennessee State players were drafted into the NBA. Hunter holds the record as the second-winningest men's basketball coach in Tennessee State's history.

Hunter became the first African American to coach the U.S. men's Olympic basketball team in 1968, leading them during their tour of the Soviet Union and Europe. He took the U.S. team to a victory over the Soviet national basketball team in a game held in Minsk, part of Belarus.

Hunter also became the first African American to lead both men's and women's teams to the National Association of Intercollegiate Athletics (NAIA) national basketball tournament. He later coached both men's and women's college basketball at Xavier University of Louisiana from May 1974 to 1977; as an assistant coach for Dillard University's women's team under head coach Mary Teamer during the 1980s; and at Southern University from 1986 to 1991. All of these schools are in New Orleans.

He began coaching Xavier's Gold Rush basketball team in May 1974 following the departure of previous coach Bob Hopkins. Under Hunter, the team placed 11–9 in the 1974–75 season (winning his first seven games with the team), 12–15 in the 1975–76 season, but only won six games during the 1976–77 season. He was succeeded as coach by Bernard Griffith in 1977. During his tenure, he encouraged his players to participate in charitable activities: In 1975, the team repainted the university's St. Michael's residence hall during summer break., and they played an exhibition game to benefit the Big Brothers of Greater New Orleans on November 8, 1975.

== Retirement ==
Hunter and his wife, Jacqueline, resided in New Orleans after his retirement from coaching. They were forced to leave New Orleans and move to Tennessee after Hurricane Katrina struck and flooded the city in 2005.

Hunter was interviewed for the 2008 ESPN documentary, Black Magic, which focused on early, pioneering basketball players from Historically Black Colleges and Universities in the United States.

Harold Hunter died at his home in Hendersonville, Tennessee, at 6:55 a.m on March 7, 2013, at the age of 86. He was survived by his wife, Jacqueline T. Hunter, a biology faculty member at Xavier University of Louisiana; daughter, Micki; and son, Harold Jr.

== See also ==
- Race and ethnicity in the NBA
