= Danny Finn =

American basketball player

Personal information
- Born: May 29, 1928 Brooklyn, New York, U.S.
- Died: February 18, 2007 (aged 78) Florida, U.S.
- Listed height: 6 ft 1 in (1.85 m)
- Listed weight: 185 lb (84 kg)

Career information
- High school: New Utrecht (Brooklyn, New York)
- College: St. John's (1947–1949)
- Playing career: 1952–1962
- Position: Point guard / shooting guard
- Number: 12, 14, 7
- Coaching career: 1960–1962

Career history

Playing
- 1952–1955: Philadelphia Warriors
- 1954–1959: Wilkes-Barre Barons
- 1960–1961: Hazleton Hawks

Coaching
- 1960–1961: Hazleton Hawks
- 1961–1962: Scranton Miners
- 1961–1962: Wilkes-Barre Barons

Career highlights
- 4× EPBL champion (1955, 1956, 1958, 1959); All-EPBL First Team (1956)
- Stats at NBA.com
- Stats at Basketball Reference

Daniel Lawrence Finn (May 29, 1928 – February 18, 2007) was an American professional basketball player. Finn played three years for the NBA's Philadelphia Warriors. He attended St. John's University.

Finn played in the Eastern Professional Basketball League (EPBL) for the Wilkes-Barre Barons and Hazleton Hawks from 1954 to 1962. He won EPBL championships with the Barons in 1955, 1956, 1958 and 1959. Finn was selected to the All-EPBL First Team in 1956. Finn served as head coach of the Hazleton Hawks during the 1960–61 season and the Scranton Miners and Barons during the 1961–62 season.

== Career statistics ==
Legend
GP	Games played	GS	Games started	MPG	Minutes per game
FG%	Field goal percentage	3P%	3-point field goal percentage	FT%	Free throw percentage
RPG	Rebounds per game	APG	Assists per game	SPG	Steals per game
BPG	Blocks per game	PPG	Points per game	**Bold**	Career high

=== NBA ===
==== Regular season ====
Year	Team	GP	MPG	FG%	FT%	RPG	APG	PPG
1952–53	Philadelphia	31	**32.7**	.330	.544	**5.6**	**4.7**	**11.9**
1953–54	Philadelphia	**68**	23.0	**.343**	**.643**	3.2	3.9	6.9
1954–55	Philadelphia	43	19.1	.291	.616	3.7	3.6	4.8
Career		142	23.9	.327	.599	3.9	4.0	7.3
