= Pawtucket Slaters =

Pawtucket Slaters may refer to:

- Pawtucket Slaters (baseball), a team in the New England League from 1946 to 1949
- Pawtucket Slaters (basketball), a team in the American Basketball League from 1952 to 1953
