= John Padgett =

English cricketer

John Padgett (21 November 1860 – 2 August 1943) was an English first-class cricketer, who played six matches for Yorkshire County Cricket Club between 1882 and 1889, and one match for Lord Hawke's XI in 1889.

== Life ==
Born in Scarborough, Yorkshire, England, Padgett was a right-handed batsman, who scored 130 runs at 11.81, with a top score of 25 against M Sherwin's XI. He also took two catches in the field but did not bowl.

After playing his early cricket with Scarborough Cricket Club, he was engaged at Milnrow C.C. for many years.

Padgett died in August 1943, in Withington, Manchester, Lancashire.
