= John Azary =

American basketball player (1929–1981)

Personal information
- Born: October 14, 1929 The Bronx, New York, U.S.
- Died: September 16, 1981 (aged 51) Washington, D.C., U.S.
- Listed height: 6 ft 4 in (1.93 m)

Career information
- High school: Commerce (New York City, New York)
- College: Columbia (1948–1951)
- NBA draft: 1951: 7th round, 66th overall pick
- Drafted by: Boston Celtics
- Position: Guard

Career history
- 1951–1953; 1954–1955: Scranton Miners

Career highlights
- All-EPBL Second Team (1955); Haggerty Award (1951); Second-team All-American – UPI, Look, Collier's (1951); Third-team All-American – AP (1951); 2× All-EIBL (1950, 1951)
- Stats at Basketball Reference

John D. Azary (October 14, 1929 – September 16, 1981) was an American professional basketball player. He played college basketball for Columbia College (now Columbia University) from 1948 to 1951.

Azary was born in the Bronx, New York, to Hungarian immigrants who became naturalized American citizens. He was raised in New York City. At 6 ft 4 in (1.93 m), he played the guard position, and when deciding on where to attend college, he chose to stay in the city to attend Columbia. At the time, college freshmen were not eligible to play varsity sports, so Azary's career actually began when he was a sophomore in 1948–49. In his first season, he scored 298 points in 20 games, which gave him a new school record for a first season scoring average at 14.9 points per game. This average surpassed Walt Budko's mark, who had graduated just prior to Azary's first year.

Despite being "undersized", Azary was routinely given the top defensive assignments against much taller players. He even played against centers and used his aggressiveness and hustle to outplay them. His head coach, Gordon Ridings, said of Azary: "I never saw a harder worker than John. He once stayed an hour after practice taking foul shots because he had missed two out of ten free throws in the previous night’s game."

In three seasons as a Lion he scored 1,037 points. His finest season came as senior in 1950–51. He captained Columbia as they rolled through the regular season undefeated, won the Eastern Intercollegiate League (modern day Ivy League) championship, and reached the Sweet 16 of the 1951 NCAA Tournament. Azary was the recipient of the Haggerty Award, which has been given annually since 1935–36 to the top male collegiate basketball player in the New York City area. He also capped his career with a second consecutive selection to the All-EIL First Team as well as NCAA All-American honors by various media outlets.

After his collegiate career ended, the NBA's Boston Celtics chose him in that year's draft in the seventh round (66th overall). He never played in the NBA; instead, Azary played in the American Basketball League (ABL) and the Eastern Professional Basketball League. He played for the Scranton Miners of the ABL from 1951 to 1953. Azary returned to the Scranton Miners when they joined the EPBL for the 1954–55 season and was selected to the All-EPBL Second Team. He also served as the team's head coach for two games and lost both.

Azary died of a heart attack on September 16, 1981, at age 51.
