= Doug Holcomb =

American basketball player

Personal information
- Born: February 9, 1925 Milwaukee, Wisconsin, U.S.
- Died: February 3, 2008 (aged 82) Scranton, Pennsylvania, U.S.
- Listed height: 6 ft 4 in (1.93 m)
- Listed weight: 200 lb (91 kg)

Career information
- College: Wisconsin (1940–1941, 1946–1947)
- BAA draft: 1947: undrafted
- Playing career: 1945–1950
- Position: Forward
- Coaching career: 1949–1951

Career history

Playing
- 1945–1946: Wilmington Bombers
- 1947–1950: Scranton Miners
- 1948: Baltimore Bullets
- 1948–1949: Reading Keys
- 1949–1950: Berwick Carbuilders

Coaching
- 1949–1951: Scranton
- Stats at NBA.com
- Stats at Basketball Reference

Douglas Martin Holcomb (February 9, 1925 – February 3, 2008) was an American professional basketball player. Holcomb played with the Baltimore Bullets of the Basketball Association of America from 1948 to 1949. He played at the collegiate level at the University of Wisconsin–Madison.

== BAA career statistics ==
Legend
GP	Games played
FG%	Field-goal percentage
FT%	Free-throw percentage
APG	Assists per game
PPG	Points per game

=== Regular season ===
Year	Team	GP	FG%	FT%	APG	PPG
1948–49	Baltimore	3	.250	.643	1.7	5.0
Career		3	.250	.643	1.7	5.0
