= Roy Leenig =

American basketball player and coach (1920–1982)

Biographical details
- Born: August 22, 1920
- Died: November 8, 1982 (aged 62)

Playing career
- 1944–1945: Trenton Tigers
- 1946–1947: Jersey City Atoms
- 1947–1948: Scranton Miners

Coaching career (HC unless noted)
- 1945–1946: Holy Family HS (NJ)
- 1949–1955: St. Peter's Prep (NJ)
- 1955–1961: Holy Cross

Head coaching record
- Overall: 104–48 (college)
- Tournaments: 0–1 (NCAA)

Roy Henry Leenig (August 22, 1920 – November 8, 1982) was an American basketball player and coach. He was the head coach of Holy Cross from 1955 to 1961. He coached Holy Cross to a 104–48 record and one NCAA tournament appearance, in 1956.

== Playing ==
Leenig was a star basketball player at Memorial High School in West New York, New Jersey and led the team to a state championship. In 1939, he helped lead Trinity School to an Eastern Private Schools League basketball championship and was named to the first all-league team. He did not attend college, but played for a number of professional and semi-pro basketball teams. He played two games for the Trenton Tigers of the American Basketball League during the 1944–45 season.

== Coaching ==
From 1949 to 1955, Leening coached the St. Peter's Preparatory School basketball team to 24 city, county, state, and tournament championships, including five straight state championships. In 1955, he was named head coach at Holy Cross. He was reunited with two of his former St. Peter's players, Tom Burke and George Waddleton, as well as Tom Heinsohn, who played against St. Peter's during his high school career. Another St. Peter's player, George Blaney, later followed him to Holy Cross. Leenig led the Crusaders to a 104–48 record. In his final season, the team had a 22–5 record and lost in the semifinals of the 1961 National Invitation Tournament to eventual champions Providence. He resigned on March 29, 1961 due to "compelling personal reasons".

== Head coaching record ==
=== College ===
Record table
Season	Team	Overall	Conference	Standing	Postseason
Holy Cross Crusaders (NCAA University Division independent) (1955–1961)
1955–56	Holy Cross	22–5			NCAA first round
1956–57	Holy Cross	11–12			
1957–58	Holy Cross	16–9			
1958–59	Holy Cross	14–11			
1959–60	Holy Cross	20–6			
1960–61	Holy Cross	21–5			NIT semifinals
Holy Cross:		104–48 (.684)			
Total:		104–48 (.684)			
