= Herb Scherer =

American basketball player (1929–2012)

Personal information
- Born: December 21, 1929 Maplewood, New Jersey, U.S.
- Died: June 28, 2012 (aged 82) Roswell, Georgia, U.S.
- Listed height: 6 ft 9 in (2.06 m)
- Listed weight: 212 lb (96 kg)

Career information
- High school: Bloomfield Tech (Bloomfield, New Jersey)
- College: LIU Brooklyn (1946–1950)
- NBA draft: 1950: 2nd round, 18th overall pick
- Drafted by: New York Knicks
- Playing career: 1950–1953
- Position: Center
- Number: 9, 22, 19

Career history
- 1950–1951: Tri-Cities Blackhawks
- 1951: Carbondale Aces
- 1951–1952: New York Knicks
- 1952: Bridgeport Roesslers
- 1952: Washington Capitols
- 1952–1953: Scranton Miners
- Stats at NBA.com
- Stats at Basketball Reference

Herbert Frederick Scherer (December 21, 1929 – June 28, 2012) was an American basketball player who played two seasons in the National Basketball Association (NBA).

Scherer, a 6'10" center, played collegiately at Long Island University from 1946 to 1950. He was drafted by the New York Knicks in the second round of the 1950 NBA draft (18th pick overall). Scherer played for the Tri-Cities Blackhawks in the 1950–51 NBA season, averaging 3.4 points per game as a rookie. The following season, he played for the New York Knicks, averaging 3.9 points per game.

Following his NBA career, Scherer started his own construction business. He died on June 28, 2012, in his home in Roswell, Georgia.

== Career statistics ==
=== NBA ===
Legend
GP	Games played	GS	Games started	MPG	Minutes per game
FG%	Field goal percentage	3P%	3-point field goal percentage	FT%	Free throw percentage
RPG	Rebounds per game	APG	Assists per game	SPG	Steals per game
BPG	Blocks per game	PPG	Points per game	**Bold**	Career high

==== Regular season ====
Year	Team	GP	MP	FG%	FT%	RPG	APG	PPG
1950–51	Tri-Cities	**20**		.286	.571	**2.5**	**.9**	3.4
1951–52	New York	12	13.9	**.292**	**.643**	2.2	.5	**3.9**
Career		32	13.9	.289	.592	2.4	.7	3.6
