= Wilbert King =

American basketball player

Willie King
Personal information
- Born: February 16, 1915 Birmingham, Alabama, U.S.
- Listed height: 5 ft 7 in (1.70 m)

Career information
- High school: Pershing (Detroit, Michigan)
- Playing career: 1935–1949
- Position: Guard

Career history
- 1935–1936: Central Athletic Association
- 1941–1943: Harlem Globetrotters
- 1941–1942: Trojans
- 1943–1944: Brewster Recreation
- 1946–1947: Detroit Gems
- 1947: Kansas City Stars
- 1947–1949: Harlem Globetrotters

Wilbert King
- Second baseman
- Born: February 16, 1915; Birmingham, Alabama
- Batted: Unknown Threw: Unknown

Negro league baseball debut
- 1944, for the New York Black Yankees

Last appearance
- 1947, for the Homestead Grays
- Stats at Baseball Reference

Teams
- New York Black Yankees (1944); Cleveland Buckeyes (1944); Chicago American Giants (1945–1946); Homestead Grays (1947)

Wilbert King (February 16, 1915 – death date unknown) was an American professional basketball and baseball player. King played in the Negro leagues from 1944 to 1947 with the New York Black Yankees, Cleveland Buckeyes, Chicago American Giants, and Homestead Grays. He played in the National Basketball League for the Detroit Gems in the 1946–47 season and averaged 8.2 points per game.
