= Elmore Morgenthaler =

American basketball player (1922–1997)

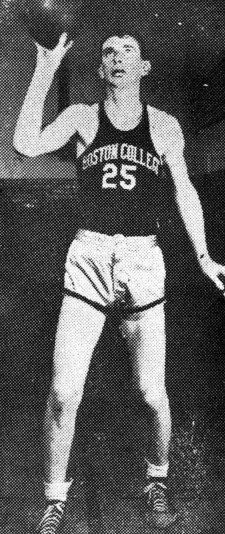
- Morgenthaler, circa 1947

Personal information
- Born: August 3, 1922 Otto, Texas, U.S.
- Died: November 25, 1997 (aged 75) Marlin, Texas, U.S.
- Listed height: 7 ft 1 in (2.16 m)
- Listed weight: 230 lb (104 kg)

Career information
- High school: Hobbs (Hobbs, New Mexico)
- College: New Mexico Tech (1946); Boston College (1946–1947)
- Playing career: 1947–1953
- Position: Center
- Number: 7, 17

Career history
- 1947: Providence Steamrollers
- 1947: Birmingham Skyhawks
- 1947–1949: Philadelphia Sphas
- 1948–1949: Philadelphia Warriors
- 1949–1950: Scranton Miners
- 1950–1951: Waterloo Hawks/Grand Rapids Hornets
- 1951: Mexico Aztecas
- 1951–1953: Scranton Miners
- Stats at NBA.com
- Stats at Basketball Reference

Elmore Robert Morgenthaler (August 3, 1922 – November 25, 1997) was an American professional basketball player. He played for the Providence Steamrollers and the Philadelphia Warriors in the Basketball Association of America (BAA), among other franchises and leagues. Standing at 7 ft 1 in (2.16 m), Morgenthaler is officially recognized as the first seven-foot player in the National Basketball Association (NBA).

Morgenthaler was raised in Mart, Texas. He attended Hobbs High School in Hobbs, New Mexico, after he had been recruited by coach Charles Finley. Morgenthaler followed Finley to play college basketball for the New Mexico Mines and he finished second in the nation in scoring with 21.8 points per game after playing for just the second semester of the 1945–46 season. The Mines were abolished at the end of the season and Morgenthaler transferred to play for the Boston College Eagles for the 1946–47 season. He quit college basketball at the end of February 1947 to play professionally for the Providence Steamrollers of the BAA. He was waived by the Steamrollers on September 27, 1947, and did not return to the BAA until he signed with the Philadelphia Warriors on November 18, 1948.

Morgenthaler's health deteriorated after his retirement. He worked at a liquor distillery to support himself. In 1996, aged 74, Morgenthaler was living by himself in a rundown apartment building in Marlin, Texas. His right arm and a part of his left leg were paralyzed from a stroke he suffered in 1984. Like other former professional basketball players in the 1940s and 1950s, Morgenthaler did not receive a pension from the NBA and lived his final years in poverty. At the time of his death, he was residing at Bremond Nursing Home in Bremond, Texas. Morgenthaler died due to pneumonia at Falls Community Hospital in Marlin.

== BAA career statistics ==
Legend
GP	Games played	FG%	Field-goal percentage
FT%	Free-throw percentage	APG	Assists per game
PPG	Points per game	**Bold**	Career high

=== Regular season ===
Year	Team	GP	FG%	FT%	APG	PPG
1946–47	Providence	11	.308	.583	.3	1.4
1948–49	Philadelphia	**20**	**.385**	**.667**	**.4**	**2.1**
Career		31	.365	.633	.3	1.8
