= Carbondale Aces =

Former American basketball team

The Carbondale Aces were an American basketball team based in Carbondale, Pennsylvania, founded in the 1950–1951 season. The team began in the Allentown-Bethlehem area of Pennsylvania and moved to Carbondale in its inaugural campaign. It was a member of the American Basketball League. The team moved to Middletown, Connecticut after being awarded to the Middletown Guards upon ceasing operations part-way through the 1951–52 season.

The team was coached by J. Birney Crum first 28 games of its existence (in Allentown). When the franchise moved to Carbondale, Jim Nolan took the reins, and continued in the role through the remainder of the team's two-year existence.

== Year-by-year ==
Year	League	Reg. season	Playoffs
1950/51	ABL	7th	Did not qualify
1951/52	ABL	6th	Did not qualify
