= Hank Rosenstein =

American basketball player (1920–2010)

Personal information
- Born: June 16, 1920 Brooklyn, New York, U.S.
- Died: February 27, 2010 (aged 89) Boca Raton, Florida, U.S.
- Listed height: 6 ft 4 in (1.93 m)
- Listed weight: 185 lb (84 kg)

Career information
- High school: Boys (Brooklyn, New York)
- Playing career: 1946–1957
- Position: Forward
- Number: 12, 8
- Coaching career: 1956–1968

Career history

Playing
- 1946–1947: New York Knicks
- 1947: Providence Steamrollers
- 1947–1952; 1955–1957: Scranton Miners

Coaching
- 1956–1960: Scranton Miners
- 1961–1962: Williamsport Billies
- 1962–1965: Scranton Miners
- 1965–1966: Wilkes-Barre Barons
- 1966–1968: Asbury Park Boardwalkers

Career highlights
- As player: EPBL champion (1957); As head coach: EPBL champion (1957)
- Stats at NBA.com
- Stats at Basketball Reference

Henry Rosenstein (June 16, 1920 – February 27, 2010) was an American professional basketball player and coach. Born in Brooklyn, New York, Rosenstein attended City College of New York before starring in AAU Basketball and being named MVP in the Eastern Jewish Center League in 1942–43. He became a member of the New York Knicks of the Basketball Association of America in 1946, playing with them in what is now considered the first NBA game, played in Toronto on November 1, 1946. On January 26, 1947, Rosenstein was sold to the Providence Steamrollers.

After the end of his stint with the Steamrollers, Rosenstein played for five seasons with the Scranton Miners of the American Basketball League, playing on their championship teams in 1949–50 and 1950–51. In the latter year he led the team in scoring.

Rosenstein played for the Scranton Miners in the Eastern Professional Basketball League (EPBL) from 1955 to 1957. He also served as head coach of the Miners from 1956 to 1960, and won the EPBL championship in 1957. Rosenstein was head coach of the Williamsport Billies during the 1961–62 season, the Miners from 1962 to 1965, the Wilkes-Barre Barons during the 1965–66 season and the Asbury Park Boardwalkers from 1966 to 1968.

Ronstein was Coach of the New York Tapers of the AAU National Industrial Basketball League in 1960–1961.

Rosenstein was inducted into the National Jewish Sports Hall of Fame on March 29, 1998. He died of heart failure on February 27, 2010, in Boca Raton, Florida.

== BAA career statistics ==
Legend
GP	Games played	FG%	Field-goal percentage
FT%	Free-throw percentage	APG	Assists per game
PPG	Points per game	**Bold**	Career high

=== Regular season ===
Year	Team	GP	FG%	FT%	APG	PPG
1946–47	New York	**31**	.262	.600	**.6**	4.3
1946–47	Providence	29	**.331**	**.669**	**.6**	**8.6**
Career		60	.305	.640	.6	6.4
