= Middletown Guards =

The Middletown Guards were an American basketball team based in Middletown, Connecticut, that was a member of the American Basketball League.

The team dropped out of the league in 1953.

== Year-by-year ==
Year	League	Reg. season	Playoffs
1951/52	ABL	8th	Did not qualify
1952/53	ABL	6th	Did not qualify
