= Edward Bartels =

American basketball player

Personal information
- Born: October 8, 1925 New York City, New York, U.S.
- Died: November 4, 2007 (aged 82) Killingworth, Connecticut, U.S.
- Listed height: 6 ft 5 in (1.96 m)
- Listed weight: 195 lb (88 kg)

Career information
- High school: La Salle Academy (New York City, New York)
- College: NC State (1946–1949)
- NBA draft: 1949: undrafted
- Playing career: 1949–1951
- Position: Forward
- Number: 22, 19, 17

Career history
- 1949: Denver Nuggets
- 1949–1950: New York Knicks
- 1950–1951: Washington Capitols
- 1951: Utica Pros
- Stats at NBA.com
- Stats at Basketball Reference

Edward John Bartels (October 8, 1925 – November 4, 2007) was an American basketball player.

He played collegiately for North Carolina State University.

He played for the Denver Nuggets and New York Knicks (1949–50) and Washington Capitols (1950–51) in the NBA for 32 games.

== NBA career statistics ==
Legend
GP	Games played	GS	Games started	MPG	Minutes per game
FG%	Field goal percentage	3P%	3-point field goal percentage	FT%	Free throw percentage
RPG	Rebounds per game	APG	Assists per game	SPG	Steals per game
BPG	Blocks per game	PPG	Points per game	**Bold**	Career high

=== Regular season ===
Year	Team	GP	FG%	FT%	RPG	APG	PPG
1949–50	Denver	13	**.256**	.548	–	**1.5**	**4.5**
1949–50	New York	2	.250	**.667**	–	0.0	2.0
1950–51	Washington	**17**	.247	.522	4.9	0.7	4.2
Career		32	.251	.538	4.9	1.0	4.2
