= Scranton Armory =

- U.S. National Register of Historic Places
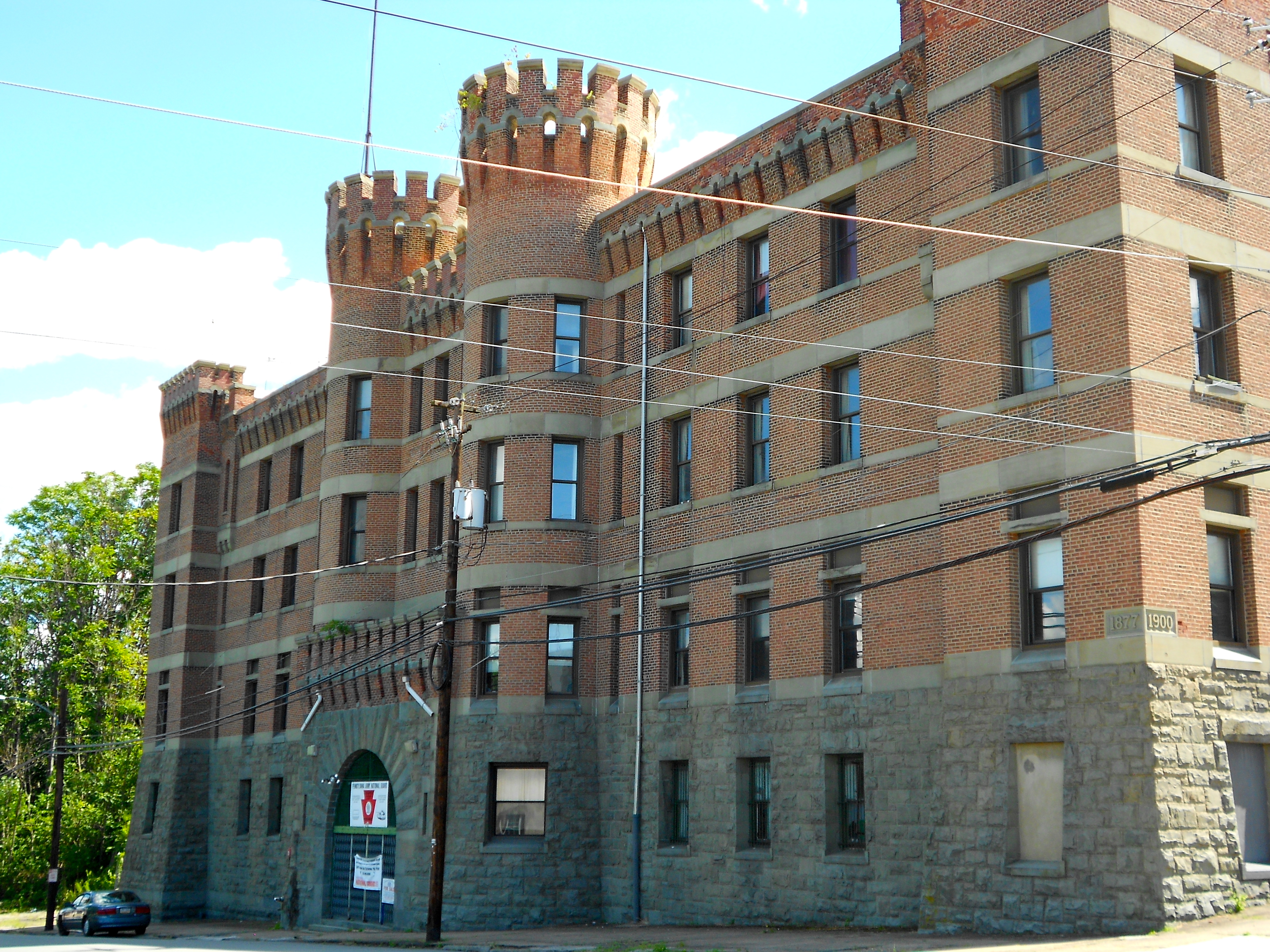
- Main entrance

- Location within Pennsylvania Location within the United States
- Location: 900 Adams Ave., Scranton, Pennsylvania
- Coordinates: 41°24′55″N 75°39′10″W
- Area: 1.6 acres (0.65 ha)
- Built: 1900
- Architect: Holden, Lansing C.
- Architectural style: Romanesque
- MPS: Pennsylvania National Guard Armories MPS
- NRHP reference No.: 89002081
- Added to NRHP: December 22, 1989

Scranton Armory is a historic National Guard armory located at Scranton, Lackawanna County, Pennsylvania. It was built in 1900, and is a four-story, 20 bays by 26 bays, brick and stone building executed in the Romanesque Revival style. The front facade features a central stone arch entrance flanked by crenellated towers.

It was added to the National Register of Historic Places in 1989.

== Gallery ==
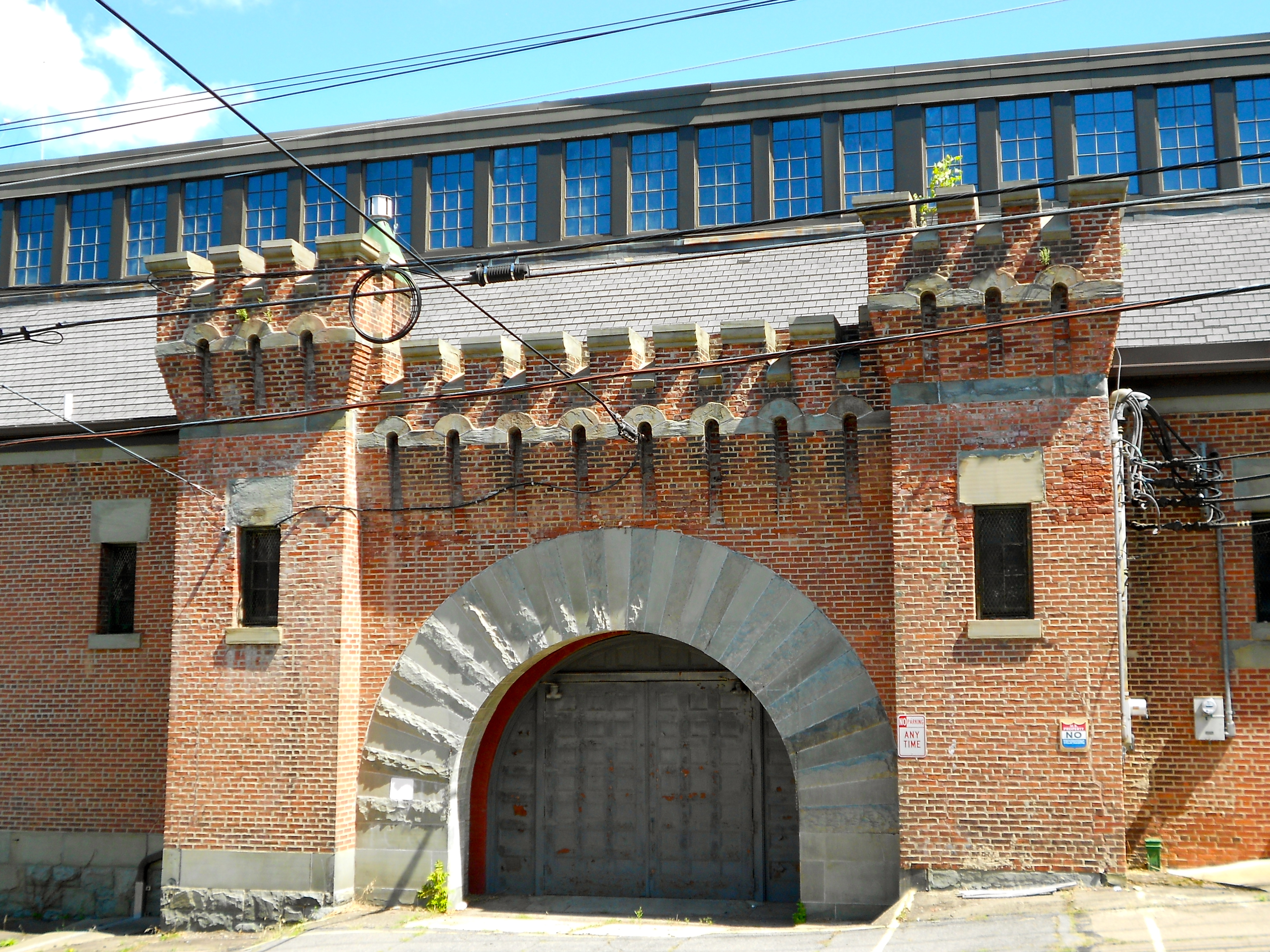
Side entrance

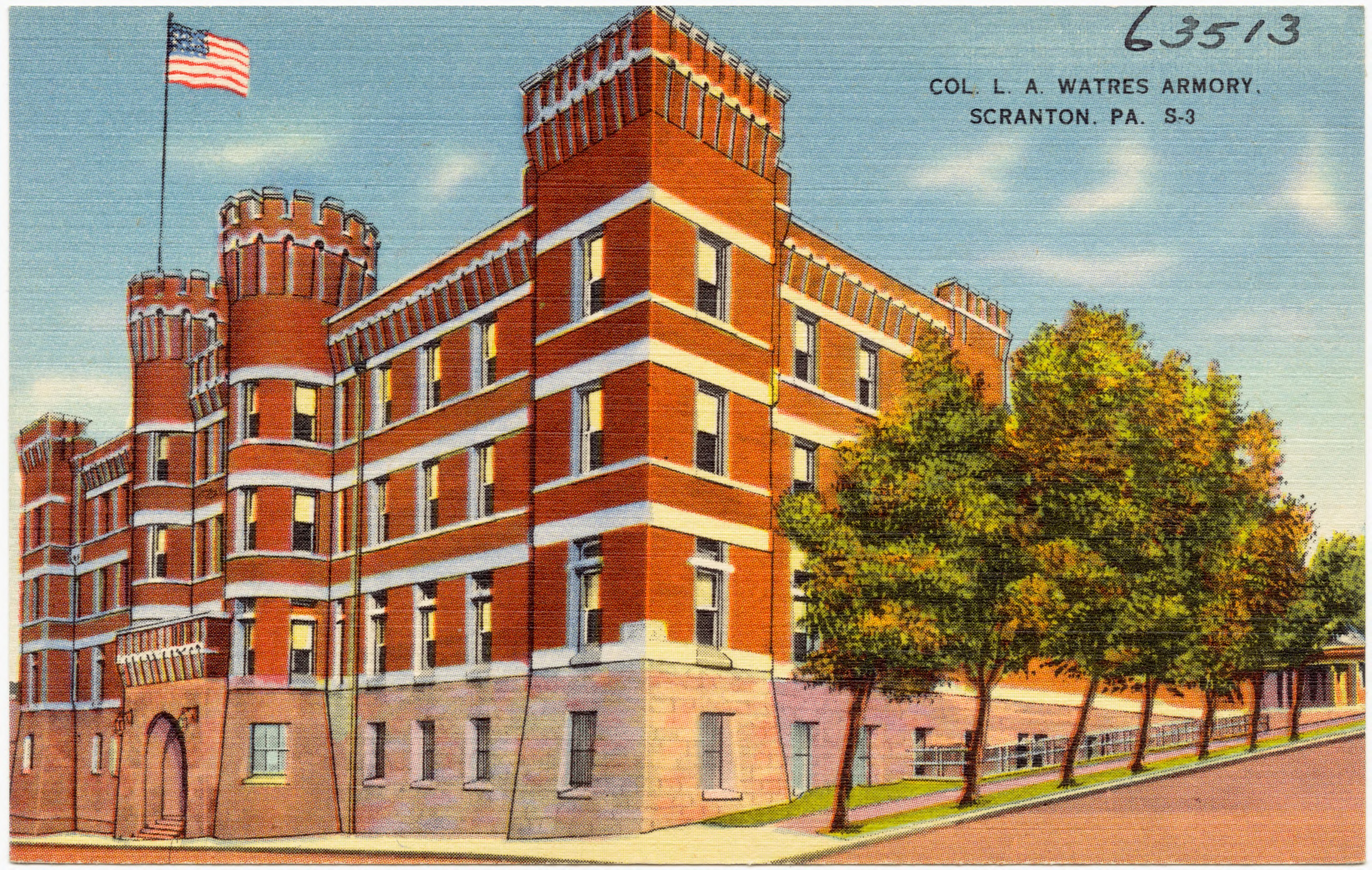
1930s postcard
