= Scranton Miners =

Coordinates: 41°24′41.6″N 75°37′32.1″W

- Leagues: ABL (1946–1953); EBA (1954–1977)
- History: Scranton Miners (1947–1970); Scranton Apollos (1970–77)
- Location: Scranton, Pennsylvania
- Team colors: red, white, blue
- Ownership: Arthur Pachter
- Championships: 1950, 1951

The Scranton Miners, known as the Scranton Apollos from 1970 to 1977, were a professional basketball team based in Scranton, Pennsylvania that was a member of the American Basketball League and the Eastern Basketball Association. Arthur Pachter was the owner and coach for many years.

The team began play in 1946 known as the Jersey City Atoms and played at the Jersey City Armory before moving to Scranton midway through the 1947/48 season. They played in the ABL until 1953. After a two-year hiatus, they were resurrected in the middle of the 1954–55 season in the Eastern Professional Basketball League as a replacement for the Carbondale Celtics. For many years the team was owned by local businessman, Art Pachter, and played games at the Scranton CYC building. During its brief existence the team won two championships, led by Syracuse University alum Jim Boeheim (who later became its head coach). They were renamed the Scranton Apollos in 1970, and folded in 1977.

In June 1963, Scranton Miners owner Arthur Pachter announced the team had signed Paul Seymour to a one-year contract as head coach. The details of the contract were not disclosed, but Pachter told the Associated Press, "[it is] unquestionably the highest ever paid to a coach in the Eastern Basketball Association." Scranton hosted the 1969 Eastern Basketball Association (EBA) All-Star Game. The league also held the 1971 EBA All-Star Game on February 17 in Scranton at the Scranton CYC Building. On January 25, 1976, Scranton Apollos player Charlie Criss set an EBA record for points scored in a game with 72.

The Scranton Miners were resurrected in 1993 by an investment group led by attorneys George Daniel and Anthony Daniel. The Miners were charter members of the Atlantic Basketball Association and again played at the Scranton CYC for 3 seasons The Miners captured the league's regular season title in 1993–94 and in 1994–95. The Miners defeated the Trenton Flames to win the 1994–95 ABA championship. The franchise was sold and moved to Connecticut following the 1995–96 season.

== Year-by-year ==
Year	League	Reg. season	Playoffs
1946/47	ABL	2nd, Northern	Playoffs
1947/48	ABL	4th	Playoffs
1948/49	ABL	2nd	Finals
1949/50	ABL	1st	Champion
1950/51	ABL	1st	Champion (no playoff)
1951/52	ABL	1st	Finals
1952/53	ABL	4th	Playoffs
1954/55	EBL	3rd	Playoffs
1955/56	EBL	3rd	Playoffs
1956/57	EBL	1st	Champion
1957/58	EBL	5th	DNQ
1958/59	EBL	1st	Finals
1959/60	EBL	4th	DNQ
1960/61	EBL	3rd	Playoffs
1961/62	EBL	7th	DNQ
1962/63	EBL	5th	DNQ
1963/64	EBL	3rd	Playoffs
1964/65	EBL	2nd	Finals
1965/66	EBL	3rd	Playoffs
1966/67	EBL	1st	Finals
1967/68	EBL	7th	DNQ
1968/69	EBL	2nd	Playoffs
1969/70	EBL	7th	DNQ
1970/71	EBA	1st	Champion
1971/72	EBA	2nd	Finals
1972/73	EBA	3rd	Playoffs
1973/74	EBA	2nd	Playoffs
1974/75	EBA	3rd	Playoffs
1975/76	EBA	2nd	Playoffs
1976/77	EBA	2nd	Champion
