= 1950–51 Saratoga Harlem Yankees season =

American Basketball League season

- League: American Basketball League (revived original)
- Head coach: Charlie Isles; Eddie Younger; Art Joseph
- General manager: Art Joseph; Eddie Younger
- Owner(s): Art Joseph; Eddie Younger
- Arena: Convention Hall; Saratoga (Springs) Armory(?)

Results
- Record: 5–25 (.167)
- Place: Conference: 6th
- Playoff finish: Did not qualify. (No playoffs were officially held that season anyway.)

The 1950–51 Saratoga Harlem Yankees season was officially considered the second professional basketball season of play for the all-black Harlem Yankees franchise, as well their only full season of play in Saratoga, New York after they previously started out their first ABL season in New York City as the New York Harlem Yankees before going to Saratoga, New York to become the Saratoga Harlem Yankees for the rest of that season in the revived (yet struggling) original version of the American Basketball League. Entering this season, the Harlem Yankees would be one of seven teams competing for the ABL's championship this time around, though the ABL would end up seeing a chain reaction occur near the end of the season where they wouldn't be able to have a proper playoff series occur properly for this season. In any case, the Harlem Yankees would end up seeing themselves perform a lot more poorly throughout this season than they had done in their previous season in the ABL. While they would be financially stable enough to stay in Saratoga throughout the entire season, they would unfortunately become the second-worst team of the entire league for this season with a 5–25 record behind only the newly added Allentown / Carbondale Aces expansion team for this season. Despite the ABL not having a playoff system to utilize properly for this season, the Harlem Yankees would have failed to qualify for the league's playoffs properly had they been able to utilize the ABL Playoffs for this season anyways due to the win record discrepancy between the Harlem Yankees and the other two teams that were considered the #4 seed that season (both unofficially and officially) in the Utica Pros and the Bridgeport Aer-A-Sols.

== Roster ==
Due to information on American Basketball League players being generally hard to find (especially by the time the ABL was designated more as a minor league during its later years of existence), there are bound to be more gaps and/or inaccuracies found in certain areas on the team's roster spots than usual.

Player	Position(s)
Ed Anderson	F/C
Puggy Bell	G/F
Hank DeZonie	C/F
Joe Galiber	Unknown
Vic Hanson	G/F
Bucky Hatchett	Unknown
Johnny Isaacs	G
Charlie Isles	Unknown
Benny McNeil	C
Johnny Rucker	Unknown
Henry "Ben" Singleton	F
Norm Skinner	Unknown
Charlie Smallwood	C
Buddy Thompson	F/C
Jim Usry	F/C
Isaac Walthour	G
Leroy "Mel" Watkins	Unknown
Preston Wilcox	Unknown
Sonny Wood	G
Eddie Younger	G

Note: In addition to all of these players, there was also an unknown player with the last name of Winfield who was briefly on the team, with Henry Jaycock also being on the team's roster at some point in time as well, though he never played a single game in the ABL with Saratoga in this case.

== American Basketball League Standings ==
Pos.	Team	Wins	Losses	Win %
1	Scranton Miners	28	8	.778
2	Wilkes-Barre Barons^{×}^{[a]}	28	11	.718
3	Paterson Crescents	21	16	.568
4	Bridgeport Aer-A-Sols	18	15	.545
5	Utica Pros^{[b]}	17	22	.436
6	Saratoga Harlem Yankees	5	25	.167
7	Allentown / Carbondale Aces^{[c]}	4	24	.105

× – Withdrew from the ABL this season on February 22, 1951, following a $1,500 bond demand from the Scranton Miners.
* – The Allentown Aces moved from Allentown, Pennsylvania to nearby Carbondale, Pennsylvania during the season on December 28, 1950, following a 1–12 start to their season.

== Aborted American Basketball League Playoffs ==
Originally, the ABL intended to have a proper playoff series occur with the best four teams in the league competing against each other in something similar to what the formerly rivaling National Basketball League had done in certain seasons without divisions at hand where the best four teams of the season would compete against each other (in this case, had the Wilkes-Barre Barons not left the ABL left in the season, it would have had the defending ABL champion Scranton Miners competing against the recently rebranded Bridgeport Aer-A-Sols and the Wilkes-Barre Barons would have competed against the Paterson Crescents for this season). However, because Wilkes-Barre unexpectedly withdrew from the ABL late in the season on February 22, 1951, due to a $1,500 bond demand from Scranton themselves, the planned ABL playoffs had Scranton going up against the new Utica Pros expansion team (who took on the fourth place spot in the ABL officially for this season) and the Paterson Crescents would go up against the Bridgeport Aer-A-Sols as the new #2 Vs. #3 seeded match-up. However, before the ABL playoffs were planned to begin, Utica voted to not participate in the planned (alternative) playoff set-up against Scranton; that surprising vote combined with the lack of armories for teams to compete in during a planned playoff tournament for the ABL led to the league scrapping the ABL playoffs entirely this time around (which would be somewhat similar to what happened in their 1941–42 season), with the Scranton Miners being crowned the two-time champions of the ABL following this decision. This failure by the ABL's hands would help further lead to the ABL's decline and then conclusion that happened in the 1950s decade, as well as help lead to the Paterson Crescents leaving the ABL by the end of this season alongside the aforementioned Utica Pros, though it's suggested that the Utica Pros would become the Elmira Colonels instead.

== Notes ==
^{a} The Wilkes-Barre Barons withdrew from the ABL this season on February 22, 1951 (a fair amount of time before the planned ABL playoffs were meant to begin) following a $1,500 bond demand from the Scranton Miners.
^{b} The Utica Pros were named the replacement team to enter what would have been the 1951 ABL Playoffs had they been able to begin properly, with Utica being the (new) #4 seed for the season while the Bridgeport Aer-A-Sols were named the new #3 seed instead of being the #4 seed and the Paterson Crescents were named the new #2 seed instead of being the #3 seed for this season.
^{c} The Allentown Aces moved from Allentown, Pennsylvania to nearby Carbondale, Pennsylvania during the season on December 28, 1950, following a 1–12 start to their season to become the Carbondale Aces for the rest of the season.
