= 1951–52 Saratoga Harlem Yankees / Schenectady Yankees season =

American Basketball League season

- League: American Basketball League (revived original)
- Head coach: Art Joseph; Ollie Edinboro; Bernie Sarachak
- General manager: Art Joseph; Eddie Younger
- Owner(s): Art Joseph; Eddie Younger
- Arena: Convention Hall; Schenectady Armory; Saratoga (Springs) Armory(?)

Results
- Record: 12–16 (.429)
- Place: Conference: 4th
- Playoff finish: The Saratoga Harlem Yankees lost the ABL Semifinals 3-1 to the Scranton Miners.

The 1951–52 Saratoga Harlem Yankees / Schenectady Yankees season was officially considered the third professional basketball season of play for the previously all-black (Harlem) Yankees franchise, as well their third season of play in Saratoga, New York after they previously started out their first ABL season in New York City as the New York Harlem Yankees before going to Saratoga, New York to become the Saratoga Harlem Yankees for the rest of that season and the entirety of this previous season in the revived (yet struggling) original version of the American Basketball League. Originally, the Saratoga Harlem Yankees intended to remain in Saratoga for the entirety of this season (though they would allow for players of other races and religious creeds (primarily Jewish people) to join their team after team owner Art Joseph was desperate enough to find any way for his team to be competitive for this season), but financial issues forced the team to move from Saratoga to nearby Schenectady, New York to become the Schenectady Yankees on January 15, 1952, with them staying that way until they decided to move back to nearby Saratoga to become the Saratoga Harlem Yankees once again for the rest of the season. Technically speaking, this season could be considered a season of play for the Saratoga Harlem Yankees / Schenectady Yankees / Saratoga Harlem Yankees when speaking of their entire season of play instead of just the Saratoga Harlem Yankees / Schenectady Yankees in this case. In any event, the (Harlem) Yankees looked to be one of seven (later eight) teams competing for the ABL championship for this season, with this league (briefly) including the former BAA/NBA team known as the Washington Capitols as a part of their league as well, though it would end up resulting in only six teams remaining in their league by the end of the season. Unfortunately for the (Harlem) Yankees franchise, it would also be a season where the team would have to compete in the playoffs without a proper home court on their ends, as they would end up making it to the ABL's playoffs that season despite having a losing record of 12–16 to go with their playoff placement. As a result of that lack of home court during the ABL playoffs, the Harlem Yankees would end up losing the semifinal round 3–1 to the defending league champion Scranton Miners.

== Roster ==
Due to information on American Basketball League players being generally hard to find (especially by the time the ABL was designated more as a minor league during its later years of existence), there are bound to be more gaps and/or inaccuracies found in certain areas on the team's roster spots than usual.

| Player | Position(s) |
|---|---|
| Al "Italo" Ablondi | G |
| Jerry Bailey | Unknown |
| Puggy Bell | G/F |
| Walt Cibrowski | Unknown |
| Hank DeZonie | C/F |
| Jerry Fleishman | G/F |
| Clarence Forbes | Unknown |
| Joe "Chuck" Foster | Unknown |
| Leo Gottlieb | G |
| Vic Hanson | G/F |
| Chuck Harmon | G |
| Don "Sonny" Hinds | Unknown |
| Sonny Jameson | Unknown |
| Henry Jacocks | G |
| Ed Kassler | Unknown |
| Bobby Kelly | G |
| Dolly King | F/C |
| John Mazziotta | Unknown |
| Benny McNeil | C |
| Nat Militzok | F |
| George Moore | Unknown |
| Alex Peterson | Unknown |
| Roy Reardon | Unknown |
| Hank Rosenstein | F |
| Johnny Rucker | Unknown |
| Wally Sebrowski | Unknown |
| Al Shiels | Unknown |
| Earl "Gene" Sykes | Unknown |
| Buddy Thompson | F/C |
| Leroy "Mel" Watkins | Unknown |

Note: In addition to them, there was also an unknown player with the last name of Michaels that was briefly on the team as well. Not only that, but it's currently unknown who was on the team while they were in Saratoga and when they were in Schenectady, nor when they were competing in the ABL Playoffs this season. However, in terms of players that played in at least 10 games with the (Harlem) Yankees, the players that spent a significant amount of time with them this season (to the point of potentially playing in both areas during this season) were Al "Italo" Ablondi, Hank DeZonie, Jerry Fleishman, Vic Hanson, Bobby Kelly, Dolly King, Nat Militzok, Roy Reardon, Hank Rosenstein, and Al Shiels.

== American Basketball League Standings ==
| Pos. | Team | Wins | Losses | Win % |
|---|---|---|---|---|
| 1 | Scranton Miners - z | 24 | 11 | .686 |
| 2 | Elmira Colonels - x | 22 | 18 | .550 |
| 3 | Wilkes-Barre Barons - x | 20 | 19 | .513 |
| 4 | Saratoga Harlem Yankees / Schenectady Yankees / Saratoga Harlem Yankees*^{[a]} - x | 12 | 16 | .429 |
| 5 | Manchester British-Americans**^{[b]} | 8 | 11 | .421 |
| 6 | Bridgeport Roesslers | 9 | 22 | .290 |
| 7 | Washington Capitols†^{[c]} | 15 | 7 | .682 |
| 8 | Carbondale Aces/Middletown Guards†***^{[d]} | 7 | 13 | .350 |

* – The Schenectady Yankees originally moved out of Saratoga, New York to nearby Schenectady, New York on January 15, 1952, to become the Schenectady Harlem Yankees for a few games before moving back to Saratoga for the rest of their season on February 5, 1952.
** – The Manchester British-Americans joined the ABL's season on New Year's Day in 1952 after previously playing their season in Connecticut's Eastern Basketball League.
*** – According to Total Basketball: The Ultimate Basketball Encyclopedia, the Carbondale Aces might have changed their team name to the Carbondale Big Chiefs at some point during the season. Regardless of whether the Aces did do that or not, the Carbondale franchise would ultimately end up folding their operations on January 20, 1952, with their original 6–8 record being picked up by the Middletown Guards, who ended up going 1–5 on their ends for a combined 7–13 record before they ended up dropping out of the ABL themselves on February 21, 1952.
† – Did not survive the ABL season.

== American Basketball League Playoffs ==
=== American Basketball League Semifinals ===
Due to the Saratoga Harlem Yankees not having a home venue to play in for the playoffs this season, their home games would essentially be played as road games in Scranton, Pennsylvania instead.

(4) Saratoga Harlem Yankees Vs. (1) Scranton Miners: Scranton wins series 3–1

== Notes ==
^{a} The Schenectady Yankees originally moved out of Saratoga, New York to nearby Schenectady, New York on January 15, 1952, to become the Schenectady Harlem Yankees for a few games before moving back to Saratoga for the rest of their season on February 5, 1952.
^{b} The Manchester British-Americans joined the ABL's season on New Year's Day in 1952 after previously playing their season in Connecticut's Eastern Basketball League.
^{c} The Washington Capitols in the ABL this season would be the same team that previously folded operations from the NBA in their 1950–51 season. However, the Capitols would fold operations on January 11, 1952 (this time, folding operations for good despite their 15–7 record at the time) due to the NBA threatening to sue the Capitols team and the ABL alike if the Capitols team were to use the same team history as the former BAA/NBA team despite the Washington Capitols technically having history with the ABL first due to them existing as a team in 1944 before becoming the Paterson Crescents in 1945.
^{d} According to Total Basketball: The Ultimate Basketball Encyclopedia, the Carbondale Aces might have changed their team name to the Carbondale Big Chiefs at some point during the season. Regardless of whether the Aces did do that or not, the Carbondale franchise would ultimately end up folding their operations on January 20, 1952, with their original 6–8 record being picked up by the Middletown Guards, who ended up going 1–5 on their ends for a combined 7–13 record before they ended up dropping out of the ABL themselves on February 21, 1952.
