= 1949–50 New York / Saratoga Harlem Yankees season =

American Basketball League season

- League: American Basketball League (revived original)
- Head coach: Art Joseph
- General manager: Art Joseph
- Owner(s): Art Joseph
- Arena: Convention Hall; Schenectady Armory; Saratoga Springs Armory(?)

Results
- Record: 21–17 (.553)
- Place: Conference: T–3rd
- Playoff finish: The Saratoga Harlem Yankees lost the ABL Semifinals to the Bridgeport Aer-A-Sols 2–1.

The 1949–50 New York / Saratoga Harlem Yankees season was officially considered the first professional basketball season of play for the all-black Harlem Yankees franchise, as well their only season of play in New York City before they moved to nearby Saratoga, New York (although it's assumed they also played home games in nearby Schenectady, New York as well during this season) to go from the New York Harlem Yankees to the more well-known Saratoga Harlem Yankees throughout most of their time spent in the revived (yet struggling) original version of the American Basketball League. They would become the second ever all-black franchise to ever compete in an integrated professional league after the now-defunct Dayton Rens (who were the New York Renaissance competing in Dayton, Ohio through emergency purposes) had previously held the honor of being the first ever all-black team competing in an integrated professional league (in their case, the since-defunct National Basketball League). Originally, the Harlem Yankees first operated in the more minor New York State Basketball League before they ended up being promoted to the more professional looking American Basketball League for this season of play. In any case, this team would enter this season as one of eight teams competing in the ABL as they were struggling to remain relevant as a professional basketball in terms of competition from both the newly-merged National Basketball Association (who had merged the operations of the younger, yet more citywide populated Basketball Association of America and the older, more established National Basketball League to create the NBA) and other minor leagues for the sport at the time like the Eastern Professional Basketball League (with the latter league looking to gain more relevancy themselves in their own early years of existence), though the ABL would later see themselves end their operations with only six teams remaining throughout the season. Interestingly, a good amount of the players that were on the Harlem Yankees team throughout the season would also be players that previously competed for the similarly all-black New York Renaissance (or Dayton Rens) or Harlem Globetrotters teams, with a few of these players later competing in the NBA following this season's conclusion as well.

Throughout a majority of the season, the New York Harlem Yankees would play their home games in the Convention Hall, which was considered to be the "Madison Square Garden of the North" at the time. However, due to financial issues, the team would end up moving from the Harlem area of New York City to Saratoga, New York for the rest of the season, with Saratoga being the team's primary home for the rest of their existence going forward (despite them not always staying in Saratoga throughout most of their seasons played at the time). Even with that in mind, the Harlem Yankees would end up performing well enough throughout the season thanks to the combined efforts of Hank DeZonie, Isaac Walthour, and veteran baseball star George Crowe (the last of whom would enter his penultimate season of play in the sport of basketball). As a result of their efforts, the New York turned Saratoga Harlem Yankees would get an above-average 21–17 record, which had them tie for third place with the two-time ABL champion Wilkes-Barre Barons. This would result in them qualifying for the ABL Playoffs due to them being ahead of the Hartford Hurricanes and Paterson Crescents in terms of teams that completed their seasons (with the Schenectady Packers and Trenton Tigers turned Cohoes Marras being teams that were also behind them who didn't finish their seasons properly), but also being behind only the Bridgeport Aer-A-Sols and the Scranton Miners in the season. After the Barons broke the tie for third place to have Saratoga get a fourth place spot to compete against Bridgeport, the Harlem Yankees and Aer-A-Sols would split their first two games played in the semifinal round before Bridgeport won a close, decisive Game 3 to eliminate Saratoga from competing in the championship round for this season.

== Roster ==
Due to information on American Basketball League players being generally hard to find (especially by the time the ABL was designated more as a minor league during its later years of existence), there are bound to be more gaps and/or inaccuracies found in certain areas on the team's roster spots than usual.

Player	Position(s)
Jerry Bailey	Unknown
Puggy Bell	G/F
George Crowe	F/C
Hank DeZonie	C/F
Clarence Forbes	Unknown
Don "Sonny" Hinds	Unknown
Sonny Jameson	Unknown
Benny McNeil	C
Ducky Moore	Unknown
Henry "Ben" Singleton	F
Jim Usry	F/C
Isaac Walthour	G
Sonny Wood	G

== American Basketball League Standings ==
Pos.	Team	Wins	Losses	Win %
1	Scranton Miners	27	11	.711
2	Bridgeport Aer-A-Sols	22	13	.629
3	Wilkes-Barre Barons	21	17	.552
4	New York / Saratoga Harlem Yankees*^{[a]}	21	17	.552
5	Paterson Crescents	17	18	.486
6	Hartford Hurricanes	11	26	.297
7	Trenton Tigers / Cohoes Marras**†^{[b]}	4	16	.200
8	Schenectady Packers†^{[c]}	0	4	.000

† – Did not survive the ABL season.
* – The New York Harlem Yankees moved to Saratoga, New York (though they presumably played some of their games in Schenectady, New York) during the season.
** – The Trenton Tigers would end up moving to Cohoes, New York after being without a home venue for a month straight before later folding operations without winning a single game in Cohoes under their new Cohoes Marras name.

== American Basketball League Playoffs ==
=== American Basketball League Semifinals ===
(4) Saratoga Harlem Yankees Vs. (2) Bridgeport Aer-A-Sols: Bridgeport wins series 2–1

- Game 1: March 26, 1950 @ Bridgeport: Bridgeport 81, Saratoga 78
- Game 2: March 27, 1950 @ Saratoga: Saratoga 80, Bridgeport 78
- Game 3: March 29, 1950 @ Bridgeport: Bridgeport 75, Saratoga 73

== Notes ==
^{a} The New York Harlem Yankees moved to Saratoga, New York (though they presumably played some of their games in Schenectady, New York) to become the Saratoga Harlem Yankees at some currently unknown point in time during this season.
^{b} The Trenton Tigers would move to Cohoes, New York to become the Cohoes Marras on January 7, 1950 after previously playing as a road team only from December 11-28, 1949 (with their road trip leading to nothing but defeats) before the Trenton Tigers turned Cohoes Marras folded operations by either January 30 or February 1, 1950.
^{c} The Schenectady Packers would end up dropping out of the ABL on November 23, 1949.
