= 1951–52 Bridgeport Roesslers season =

American Basketball League season

- League: American Basketball League (revived original)
- Head coach: Jerry Rizzo (1–4); Perry Pilotti (8–18)
- General manager: Perry Pilotti
- Owner(s): Unknown (Perry Pilotti?)
- Arena: Bridgeport Armory

Results
- Record: 9–22 (.290)
- Place: Conference: 6th
- Playoff finish: Did not qualify

The 1951–52 Bridgeport Roesslers season was officially the fourth and final professional basketball season for the team in Bridgeport, Connecticut known as the Roesslers (which was their only season under that name) after they previously competed as the Newfield Steelers in an independent manner in the 1948 World Professional Basketball Tournament and in the 1948–49 season in the revived (yet struggling) original version of the American Basketball League alongside competing as the Aer-A-Sols in their previous two seasons in the ABL. Entering this season, Bridgeport would be one of seven (later eight) teams competing in the ABL throughout the season, though it would devolve downward to only six remaining teams by the end of the season. Unfortunately for the newly renamed Roesslers, despite them resolving their venue issues that came up from the previous season of play, their roster would see a decline in production throughout the season, as noted by the early replacement of player-coach Jerry Rizzo with head coach Perry Pilotti for the rest of the season going forward. After both the Washington Capitols (who were the same team that previously competed in both the Basketball Association of America and the National Basketball Association up until January 1951) and the Carbondale Aces (who might have briefly played as the Carbondale Big Chiefs at a certain point in time) turned Middletown Guards folded operations throughout the season, the Bridgeport Roesslers would officially finish in last place in the league (6th place overall) with Bridgeport losing ten of their last eleven games of the season to get a very poor 9–22 record for the season, which resulted in them easily failing to qualify for the ABL Playoffs this time around. Following the conclusion of this season, the Roesslers would fold operations for good as a franchise altogether.

== Roster ==
Due to information on American Basketball League players being generally hard to find (especially by the time the ABL was designated more as a minor league during its later years of existence), there are bound to be more gaps and/or inaccuracies found in certain areas on the team's roster spots than usual.

Player	Position(s)
Bob Anderson	Unknown
Hank Baietti	Unknown
Edward Bartels	F
Al Biolsi	Unknown
Jackie Bowden	G/F
Tommy Byrnes	F/C
Jim Cascia	Unknown
Fran Curran	G
Perry Del Purgatorio	G
Ray Dombrosky	Unknown
Zeke Fazekas	G
George Feigenbaum	G
Matty Forman	Unknown
Cecil Gabriel	Unknown
Pat Gillen	Unknown
Ernie Gomez	F
John Gozdenovich	G
Mickey Homa	F
Ernie Johnson	G/F
Joel Kaufman	Unknown
Paul Klapprodt	Unknown
Bobby Knight	G/F
Bill Kotsores	Unknown
Ace Lengyel	Unknown
Frank Lewis	Unknown
Joe Oslai	F
Alex Petersen	Unknown
George Petrovick	G
Guinn Phillips	Unknown
Marty Powers	Unknown
Jerry Rizzo	G
Johnny Rusinko	Unknown
Herb Scherer	C
Tom Smith	PG/SG
Jim Springer	C
Buddy Thompson	Unknown
"Big" John Wilson	F/C
"Little" John Wilson	G
Bill Zirkel	G

Note: In addition to all of those players, there would also be a few unknown players that were on the team as well (with one of them literally being considered unknown to the general public as of 2026), with one player with the last name of Flanagan (potentially forward/center Tom Flanagan) and another player with the last name of Neksick (potentially Ted Nicksick) briefly being on the team as well.

== American Basketball League Standings ==
Pos.	Team	Wins	Losses	Win %
1	Scranton Miners - z	24	11	.686
2	Elmira Colonels - x	22	18	.550
3	Wilkes-Barre Barons - x	20	19	.513
4	Saratoga Harlem Yankees / Schenectady Yankees / Saratoga Harlem Yankees*^{[a]} - x	12	16	.429
5	Manchester British-Americans**^{[b]}	8	11	.421
6	Bridgeport Roesslers	9	22	.290
7	Washington Capitols†^{[c]}	15	7	.682
8	Carbondale Aces/Middletown Guards†***^{[d]}	7	13	.350

* – The Schenectady Yankees originally moved out of Saratoga, New York to nearby Schenectady, New York on January 15, 1952, to become the Schenectady Harlem Yankees for a few games before moving back to Saratoga for the rest of their season on February 5, 1952.
** – The Manchester British-Americans joined the ABL's season on New Year's Day in 1952 after previously playing their season in Connecticut's Eastern Basketball League.
*** – According to Total Basketball: The Ultimate Basketball Encyclopedia, the Carbondale Aces might have changed their team name to the Carbondale Big Chiefs at some point during the season. Regardless of whether the Aces did do that or not, the Carbondale franchise would ultimately end up folding their operations on January 20, 1952, with their original 6–8 record being picked up by the Middletown Guards, who ended up going 1–5 on their ends for a combined 7–13 record before they ended up dropping out of the ABL themselves on February 21, 1952.
† – Did not survive the ABL season.

== Notes ==
^{a} The Schenectady Yankees originally moved out of Saratoga, New York to nearby Schenectady, New York on January 15, 1952, to become the Schenectady Harlem Yankees for a few games before moving back to Saratoga for the rest of their season on February 5, 1952.
^{b} The Manchester British-Americans joined the ABL's season on New Year's Day in 1952 after previously playing their season in Connecticut's Eastern Basketball League.
^{c} The Washington Capitols in the ABL this season would be the same team that previously folded operations from the NBA in their 1950–51 season. However, the Capitols would fold operations on January 11, 1952 (this time, folding operations for good despite their 15–7 record at the time) due to the NBA threatening to sue the Capitols team and the ABL alike if the Capitols team were to use the same team history as the former BAA/NBA team despite the Washington Capitols technically having history with the ABL first due to them existing as a team in 1944 before becoming the Paterson Crescents in 1945.
^{d} According to Total Basketball: The Ultimate Basketball Encyclopedia, the Carbondale Aces might have changed their team name to the Carbondale Big Chiefs at some point during the season. Regardless of whether the Aces did do that or not, the Carbondale franchise would ultimately end up folding their operations on January 20, 1952, with their original 6–8 record being picked up by the Middletown Guards, who ended up going 1–5 on their ends for a combined 7–13 record before they ended up dropping out of the ABL themselves on February 21, 1952.
