= 1952–53 Hazleton / Glen Falls-Saratoga Harlem Yankees season =

American Basketball League season

- League: American Basketball League (revived original)
- Head coach: Eddie Younger (1–9); George Crowe (0–2)
- General manager: Art Joseph; Eddie Younger
- Owner(s): Art Joseph; Eddie Younger
- Arena: Hazleton Armory(?); Glen Falls Armory(?); Convention Hall Saratoga (Springs) Armory(?)

Results
- Record: 1–11 (.083)
- Place: Conference: 7th
- Playoff finish: Did not qualify. (The Hazleton Harlem Yankees folded operations on February 6, 1953.)

The 1952–53 Hazleton / Glen Falls-Saratoga Harlem Yankees season was officially considered the fourth professional basketball season of play for the previously all-black Harlem Yankees franchise, as well as what can technically be considered their fourth season of play in Saratoga, New York after they previously started out their first ABL season in New York City as the New York Harlem Yankees before going to Saratoga, New York to become the Saratoga Harlem Yankees for the rest of that season and the entirety of the 1950–51 before the previous season saw them briefly move to Schenectady, New York to become the Schenectady Yankees for a brief period of time before returning to Saratoga and being the Saratoga Harlem Yankees for the rest of that previous season in the revived (yet struggling) original version of the American Basketball League. Originally, the Saratoga Harlem Yankees moved to Hazleton, Pennsylvania to become the Hazleton Harlem Yankees to start out the season, but the team later moved to Glen Falls, New York (though still played games in Saratoga Springs, New York) after only two games of play on December 4, 1952, to become the Glen Falls-Saratoga Harlem Yankees (though they usually were just referred to as Glen Falls-Saratoga due to their unique situation at hand combined with the Harlem Yankees name not being printed out so often for them) for the rest of that season up until the team ended up withdrawing from the ABL and withdrew themselves from the struggling ABL by February 6, 1953. (Interestingly, the Harlem Yankees would get their only victory of the season on January 10, 1953, against the eventual champions of the ABL in its final season of existence, the Manchester British-Americans.) Following this season's conclusion, the ABL would end up suspending operations for their planned 1953–54 season before folding operations for good by what would have been its 1954–55 season. As for the Harlem Yankees, they would surprisingly appear once more in the 1955–56 season under the minor Eastern Professional Basketball League, where they replaced the Trenton Capitols during that season before later folding operations for good following that season's conclusion.

== Roster ==
Due to information on American Basketball League players being generally hard to find (especially by the time the ABL was designated more as a minor league during its later years of existence), there are bound to be more gaps and/or inaccuracies found in certain areas on the team's roster spots than usual.

Player	Position(s)
Jerry Bailey	Unknown
Puggy Bell	G/F
Tom Brady	Unknown
Chico Burrell	Unknown
George Crowe	F/C
Hank DeZonie	C/F
Clarence Forbes	Unknown
Vic Hanson	G/F
Billy Harrell	G
Johnny Isaacs	G
Jim Jones	Unknown
Benny McNeil	C
Henry "Ben" Singleton	F
Norm Skinner	Unknown
Leroy "Mel" Watkins	Unknown
Sonny Wood	G
Eddie Younger	G

Note: In addition to all of these players, the Harlem Yankees also had multiple unknown players with the last names of Cooper and Hill who were on the team as well. However, it's currently unknown who played for the team while they were in Hazleton and who played for the team while they were in the Glen Falls-Saratoga area.

== American Basketball League Standings ==
Pos.	Team	Wins	Losses	Win %
1	Manchester British-Americans - z	19	9	.679
2	Wilkes-Barre Barons - x	20	11	.550
3	Elmira Colonels*^{[a]} - x	17	11	.607
4	Scranton Miners*^{[b]} - x	12	11	.522
5	Pawtucket Slaters	6	19	.240
6	Middletown Guards†**^{[c]}	2	5	.286
7	Hazleton / Glen Falls-Saratoga Harlem Yankees†***^{[d]}	1	11	.083

* – Team briefly dropped out of the ABL during the season before returning to the league later on within the season.
** – The Middletown Guards dropped out of the ABL on January 8, 1953, and then disbanded as a franchise two days later on January 10, 1953.
*** – The Hazleton Harlem Yankees started their season out in Hazleton, Pennsylvania before they moved out two games into their season on December 4, 1952, to move back to Saratoga Springs, New York with games also played in Glen Falls, New York to become the Glen Falls-Saratoga Harlem Yankees for the rest of their season up until they ceased operations and withdrew operations on February 6, 1953.
† – Did not survive the ABL season.

== Notes ==
^{a} The Elmira Colonels dropped out of the ABL on October 23, 1952, alongside the Jersey City Titans due to the Colonels having Bill Spivey on their roster at the time (with the Titans having multiple players that were previously a part of the 1951 college basketball point-shaving scandal themselves as well). Initially, the Colonels tried to be an exhibition team for the season, but after a few games, they decided to cut Bill Spivey from their roster in order to return to the ABL and have the league restart their season properly with seven teams playing throughout the season instead of eight teams playing this season.
^{b} The Scranton Miners previously dropped out of the ABL on December 20, 1952, due to original team owner Joe "Speed" Maloney charging other owners with evading the league's minimum guarantee of $300 per game before they reorganized themselves under a new group of management within late December 1952 before returning to the ABL by January 10, 1953, though Scranton would later withdraw operations from the league during the ABL's playoffs (with an impromptu forfeit defeat resulting in the Manchester British-Americans going into the championship round for this season) following a controversial ruling regarding a playoff match held on March 14, 1953.
^{c} The Middletown Guards dropped out of the ABL on January 8, 1953, and then disbanded as a franchise two days later on January 10, 1953.
^{d} The Hazleton Harlem Yankees started their season out in Hazleton, Pennsylvania before they moved out two games into their season on December 4, 1952, to move back to Saratoga Springs, New York with games also played in Glen Falls, New York to become the Glen Falls-Saratoga Harlem Yankees for the rest of their season up until they ceased operations and withdrew operations on February 6, 1953.
