= 1951–52 Manchester British-Americans season =

American Basketball League season

- League: American Basketball League (revived original)
- Head coach: Johnny Falkowski (1–0); Jackie Allen (3–5); Sonny Hertzberg (4–6)
- Arena: Manchester Armory

Results
- Record: 8–11 (.421)
- Place: Conference: 5th
- Playoff finish: Did not qualify

The 1951–52 Manchester British-Americans season was the first season of play by the British-Americans franchise from Manchester, Connecticut in the revived (yet clearly struggling) original version of the American Basketball League. Originally, the British-Americans would (supposedly) compete in the state of Connecticut's own version of the Eastern Basketball League that rivaled the Eastern Professional Basketball Association (formerly the Eastern Professional Basketball Association) before they ended up being promoted into the ABL on New Year's Day by January 1, 1952 in order to have eight teams competing in their league once again this season. However, that vision would only be a brief one for the struggling ABL, as the (new) Washington Capitols (who formerly were a BAA/NBA franchise) would fold operations (this time for good) days later on January 10, 1952, with the Carbondale Aces (who were later replaced by the Middletown Guards) following suit not long afterward to have six competing teams by the end of the season. Despite those setbacks and the disadvantageous spot Manchester had throughout the season (including having multiple head coaches (most of them being player-coaches) leading them this time around), the British-Americans were looking to compete in the ABL's playoffs and potentially win the league's championship for the season. Unfortunately for them, their late entry would prove to be a futile one for them, as Manchester would get a below-average 8–11 record for a fifth place finish to be ahead of the Bridgeport Roesslers in terms of surviving teams for the season, which resulted in the British-Americans failing to qualify for the ABL Playoffs this season.

== Roster ==
Due to information on American Basketball League players being generally hard to find (especially by the time the ABL was designated more as a minor league during its later years of existence), there are bound to be more gaps and/or inaccuracies found in certain areas on the team's roster spots than usual.

1951–52 Manchester British-Americans roster
Players

Pos.	No.	Player	Height	Weight	DOB	From
		Jackie Allen			1923-04-11	Rhode Island
G/F		Clarence Bell	6 ft 2 in (1.88 m)	185 lb (84 kg)	1914-11-26	No college
		Verne Cox			1920-01-02	Springfield
		John Dobrutsky			1922-01-27	Weaver HS (CT)
		Harry Foley			1928-08-27	Niagara
		Don Goodwin			1927-11-04	Tufts College
		Kenny Goodwin			1927-11-04	Rhode Island
G/F		Vic Hanson	6 ft 2 in (1.88 m)	195 lb (88 kg)	1928-02-29	Long Island
G		Sonny Hertzberg	5 ft 10 in (1.78 m)	175 lb (79 kg)	1922-07-29	CCNY
G/F		Bob Knight	6 ft 2 in (1.88 m)	185 lb (84 kg)	1929-04-30	Weaver HS (CT)
		Joe Kubachka			1924-03-21	Springfield
F		Paul Labanowski	6 ft 4 in (1.93 m)	205 lb (93 kg)	1928-03-27	St. Francis Brooklyn
F		Bill Massa	6 ft 4 in (1.93 m)		1925-07-28	New Britain State
		John Mazziotta			1930-05-15	Georgetown
		Al Palmieri			1922-09-07	Rhode Island
		Tom Whipple			1927-12-11	No college

Coaches
Head coach

Johnny Falkowski
Jackie Allen
Sonny Hertzberg

Legend
- (DP) Unsigned draft pick
- (FA) Free agent
- (S) Suspended
- Injured

== American Basketball League Standings ==
Pos.	Team	Wins	Losses	Win %
1	Scranton Miners - z	24	11	.686
2	Elmira Colonels - x	22	18	.550
3	Wilkes-Barre Barons - x	20	19	.513
4	Saratoga Harlem Yankees / Schenectady Yankees / Saratoga Harlem Yankees*^{[a]} - x	12	16	.429
5	Manchester British-Americans**^{[b]}	8	11	.421
6	Bridgeport Roesslers	9	22	.290
7	Washington Capitols†^{[c]}	15	7	.682
8	Carbondale Aces/Middletown Guards†***^{[d]}	7	13	.350

* – The Schenectady Yankees originally moved out of Saratoga, New York to nearby Schenectady, New York on January 15, 1952 to become the Schenectady Harlem Yankees for a few games before moving back to Saratoga for the rest of their season on February 5, 1952.
** – The Manchester British-Americans joined the ABL's season on New Year's Day in 1952 after previously playing their season in Connecticut's Eastern Basketball League.
*** – According to Total Basketball: The Ultimate Basketball Encyclopedia, the Carbondale Aces might have changed their team name to the Carbondale Big Chiefs at some point during the season. Regardless of whether the Aces did do that or not, the Carbondale franchise would ultimately end up folding their operations on January 20, 1952, with their original 6–8 record being picked up by the Middletown Guards, who ended up going 1–5 on their ends for a combined 7–13 record before they ended up dropping out of the ABL themselves on February 21, 1952.
† – Did not survive the ABL season.

== Notes ==
^{a} The Schenectady Yankees originally moved out of Saratoga, New York to nearby Schenectady, New York on January 15, 1952 to become the Schenectady Harlem Yankees for a few games before moving back to Saratoga for the rest of their season on February 5, 1952.
^{b} The Manchester British-Americans joined the ABL's season on New Year's Day in 1952 after previously playing their season in Connecticut's Eastern Basketball League.
^{c} The Washington Capitols in the ABL this season would be the same team that previously folded operations from the NBA in their 1950–51 season. However, the Capitols would fold operations on January 11, 1952 (this time, folding operations for good despite their 15–7 record at the time) due to the NBA threatening to sue the Capitols team and the ABL alike if the Capitols team were to use the same team history as the former BAA/NBA team despite the Washington Capitols technically having history with the ABL first due to them existing as a team in 1944 before becoming the Paterson Crescents in 1945.
^{d} According to Total Basketball: The Ultimate Basketball Encyclopedia, the Carbondale Aces might have changed their team name to the Carbondale Big Chiefs at some point during the season. Regardless of whether the Aces did do that or not, the Carbondale franchise would ultimately end up folding their operations on January 20, 1952, with their original 6–8 record being picked up by the Middletown Guards, who ended up going 1–5 on their ends for a combined 7–13 record before they ended up dropping out of the ABL themselves on February 21, 1952.
