= 1952–53 Manchester British-Americans season =

American Basketball League season

- League champions
- Conference champions
- League: American Basketball League (revived original)
- Head coach: Sonny Hertzberg (9–3); Puggy Bell (10–6)
- Arena: Manchester Armory

Results
- Record: 19–9 (.679)
- Place: Conference: 1st
- Playoff finish: Won ABL championship 2–0 over the Wilkes-Barre Barons

The 1952–53 Manchester British-Americans season was the second and final season of play (as well as their only full ABL season of play, although it's suggested to be a bit more than that due to them apparently previously competing in Connecticut's version of the Eastern Basketball League) by the British-Americans franchise from Manchester, Connecticut in the revived (yet clearly struggling) original version of the American Basketball League. Originally, the British-Americans were meant to be one of eight teams competing in the ABL this season before the season started out with seven teams instead due to the Jersey City Titans dropping out of the league (and almost causing the original cancellation of this ABL season entirely) after they and the Elmira Colonels originally started out their preseason periods with players that had been involved with the 1951 college basketball point-shaving scandal. Despite the sudden shift in when the regular season would begin for Manchester, the British-Americans would end up performing well right out of the gate by winning their first five games of the season. Of course, league instability would still see them get an impromptu coaching change during the season in spite of them performing well throughout the season, as player-coach Sonny Hertzberg would be replaced by another player-coach in Puggy Bell instead. In spite of the impromptu coaching change during the season, the Manchester British-Americans would still see themselves finish the season in first place due to the combination of talents involving mixed races and the top-tier talent of rookie center Ray Felix, who joined the team following the aftermath of the 1951 college basketball point-shaving scandal in regards to Long Island University's involvement there. However, even in spite of Manchester's success this season, this season's playoffs would become controversial for the ABL due to what would occur with their opponents in the Scranton Miners during the semifinal round.

Initially, the plan for the semifinal round of the ABL Playoffs would have both the #1 Manchester British-Americans and the #4 seeded Scranton Miners and the #3 seeded Elmira Colonels and the #2 seeded Wilkes-Barre Barons compete in a best-of-seven series before the remaining two teams would compete in the championship series in a proper manner. For the series between Manchester and Scranton, it originally looked like it would go as planned due to Manchester winning the first game of their series and Scranton winning the second game with a 100–94 final score. However, when the British-Americans squad realized that the Miners squad had added an extra player that wasn't on their regular season team earlier on in point guard Perry Del Purgatorio due to him previously being involved with the Korean War, Manchester would end up protesting the results of that game, much to the chagrin of commissioner John J. O'Brien, who tried to get them to drop the protest. When they would not drop it, O'Brien would decide to rule in favor of the British-Americans team, which led to Scranton deciding to drop out of the ABL Playoffs entirely due to that decision. The extra rest for Manchester following that decision may have very well later led to them sweeping the defending champion Wilkes-Barre Barons to become the final ABL champions in league history; when the British-Americans went up against the Barons in the final ABL championship ever held, Manchester would end up sweeping Wilkes-Barre 2–0 in what suddenly became a best-of-three championship series instead of a best-of-seven (or even a best-of-five) championship series properly. Following this season's conclusion, multiple factors beyond the league's control would result in the ABL deciding to suspend its operations for its planned 1953–54 season before shutting down operations entirely by the time its planned 1954–55 season was set to begin operations. As for the Manchester British-Americans, they would briefly end up playing for the Eastern Basketball Association that was held in the state of Connecticut before that folded operations itself. This team's success during this season would also be considered notable enough for helping propagate basketball's popularity in the United Kingdom, where a team like the Manchester Giants in the British Basketball League would consider the British-Americans team as a part of their inspiration.

== Roster ==
Due to information on American Basketball League players being generally hard to find (especially by the time the ABL was designated more as a minor league during its later years of existence), there are bound to be more gaps and/or inaccuracies found in certain areas on the team's roster spots than usual.

1952–53 Manchester British-Americans roster
Players

Pos.	No.	Player	Height	Weight	DOB	From
PG		Don Ackerman	6 ft 0 in (1.83 m)	183 lb (83 kg)	1930-09-04	Long Island
		Jackie Allen			1923-04-11	Rhode Island
F		Edward Bartels	6 ft 5 in (1.96 m)	195 lb (88 kg)	1925-10-08	NC State
G/F		Clarence Bell	6 ft 2 in (1.88 m)	185 lb (84 kg)	1914-11-26	No college
PG		Dick Bunt	6 ft 0 in (1.83 m)	170 lb (77 kg)	1930-07-13	NYU
G/F		Hank DeZonie	6 ft 2 in (1.88 m)	180 lb (82 kg)	1922-02-12	Clark Atlanta
C		Ray Felix	6 ft 11 in (2.11 m)	220 lb (100 kg)	1930-12-10	Long Island
		Kenny Goodwin			1927-11-04	Rhode Island
G		Sonny Hertzberg	5 ft 10 in (1.78 m)	175 lb (79 kg)	1922-07-29	CCNY
		Johnny Hughes			Unknown	Manhattan
G/F		Bob Knight	6 ft 2 in (1.88 m)	185 lb (84 kg)	1929-04-30	Weaver HS (CT)
		Joe Kubachka			1924-03-21	Springfield
		John Mazziotta			1930-05-15	Georgetown
		Bobby McLarnon			1926-10-24	Holy Cross
F/C		Ralph Polson	6 ft 7 in (2.01 m)	200 lb (91 kg)	1929-10-26	Whitworth
		Wally Widholm			1927-08-06	Connecticut
		Yogi Yokabaskas			1929-05-17	Connecticut

Coaches
Head coach

Sonny Hertzberg
Puggy Bell

Legend
- (DP) Unsigned draft pick
- (FA) Free agent
- (S) Suspended
- Injured

Note: It's currently unknown what the team's official roster was for the final ABL Playoffs held would be, though it's suggested that player-coach Sonny Hertzberg wasn't on the team while player-coach Puggy Bell was on the team alongside Ray Felix.

== American Basketball League Standings ==
Pos.	Team	Wins	Losses	Win %
1	Manchester British-Americans - z	19	9	.679
2	Wilkes-Barre Barons - x	20	11	.550
3	Elmira Colonels*^{[a]} - x	17	11	.607
4	Scranton Miners*^{[b]} - x	12	11	.522
5	Pawtucket Slaters	6	19	.240
6	Middletown Guards†**^{[c]}	2	5	.286
7	Hazleton / Glen Falls-Saratoga Harlem Yankees†***^{[d]}	1	11	.083

* – Team briefly dropped out of the ABL during the season before returning to the league later on within the season.
** – The Middletown Guards dropped out of the ABL on January 8, 1953 and then disbanded as a franchise two days later on January 10, 1953.
*** – The Hazleton Harlem Yankees started their season out in Hazleton, Pennsylvania before they moved out two games into their season on December 4, 1952 to move back to Saratoga Springs, New York with games also played in Glen Falls, New York to become the Glen Falls-Saratoga Harlem Yankees for the rest of their season up until they ceased operations and withdrew operations on February 6, 1953.
† – Did not survive the ABL season.

== American Basketball League Playoffs ==
=== American Basketball League Semifinals ===
Originally, the #1 seeded Manchester British-Americans would go up against the #4 seeded Scranton Miners in a best-of-seven semifinal round series. After Manchester had previously beaten the Miners in the first game out in Manchester, Connecticut (where the score and date is currently unknown at this time), Scranton would defeat the British-Americans with a 100–94 final score on March 14, 1952 in Scranton, Pennsylvania to even up the semifinal round for that series. However, Game 2 was met with controversy from Manchester due to Scranton utilizing the services of Perry Del Purgatorio, who had recently been discharged from his services within the U.S. military following the upcoming conclusion of the Korean War, but hadn't played in any previous games that season. While ABL President John J. O'Brien did acknowledge that the "league had operated with many rule infractions this season" and tried to get the British-Americans team to drop their protest for the playoff game that had been played, the Manchester squad would not do so, which later led to O'Brien ruling in favor of the Manchester British-Americans. Following that awkward situation at hand, the Scranton Miners decided to quit out on the ABL for the rest of the season, which led to the Manchester British-Americans automatically qualifying for the ABL's championship series by default, which subsequently marked the first and only time in the league's history where such a thing would happen in the first place.

=== American Basketball League Championship Round ===
(1) Manchester British-Americans Vs. (2) Wilkes-Barre Barons: Manchester wins series 2–0

The Manchester British-Americans would end up becoming the final champions of the original American Basketball League's overall history.

== Awards and honors ==
By the end of the season, rookie center Ray Felix would end up being the leading scorer of the entire league for the twentieth (and final) season of its return and its 26th and final overall season of its existence with 618 points scored for an average of 22.0 points per game, which would be the highest points per game average in the ABL's entire existence. The high scoring production throughout his rookie season under what would technically still be considered a professional basketball league at the time (and not a minor league like how most media outlets were treating the ABL by this point in time) would cause Felix to be the #1 draft pick in the 1953 NBA draft by the original rendition of the Baltimore Bullets (who, ironically enough, were a former ABL team themselves before joining what ultimately became the present-day NBA), with Felix later earning an NBA All-Star spot and then winning the NBA Rookie of the Year Award the following year afterward in 1954 for the work he did while he was with the Bullets that season.

== Notes ==
^{a} The Elmira Colonels dropped out of the ABL on October 23, 1952 alongside the Jersey City Titans due to the Colonels having Bill Spivey on their roster at the time (with the Titans having multiple players that were previously a part of the 1951 college basketball point-shaving scandal themselves as well). Initially, the Colonels tried to be an exhibition team for the season, but after a few games, they decided to cut Bill Spivey from their roster in order to return to the ABL and have the league restart their season properly with seven teams playing throughout the season instead of eight teams playing this season.
^{b} The Scranton Miners previously dropped out of the ABL on December 20, 1952 due to original team owner Joe "Speed" Maloney charging other owners with evading the league's minimum guarantee of $300 per game before they reorganized themselves under a new group of management within late December 1952 before returning to the ABL by January 10, 1953, though Scranton would later withdraw operations from the league during the ABL's playoffs (with an impromptu forfeit defeat resulting in the Manchester British-Americans going into the championship round for this season) following a controversial ruling regarding a playoff match held on March 14, 1953.
^{c} The Middletown Guards dropped out of the ABL on January 8, 1953 and then disbanded as a franchise two days later on January 10, 1953.
^{d} The Hazleton Harlem Yankees started their season out in Hazleton, Pennsylvania before they moved out two games into their season on December 4, 1952 to move back to Saratoga Springs, New York with games also played in Glen Falls, New York to become the Glen Falls-Saratoga Harlem Yankees for the rest of their season up until they ceased operations and withdrew operations on February 6, 1953.
