= 1952–53 Elmira Colonels season =

American Basketball League season

- League: American Basketball League (revived original)
- Head coach: Mike Novak (17–10); Ed Earle (0–1)
- General manager: Harl Robacher
- Owner(s): Harl Robacher
- Arena: Elmira Armory

Results
- Record: 17–11 (.607)
- Place: Conference: 3rd
- Playoff finish: Did not qualify

The 1952–53 Elmira Colonels season was officially considered the second and final season of play for the Elmira Colonels (not to be confused with the Elmira Colonels that competed in the minor New York-Pennsylvania Basketball League in their spare time while also competing in the more major National Basketball League as the Warren Penns / Cleveland White Horses) that competed in Elmira, New York in the revived (yet struggling) original version of the American Basketball League. Unofficially speaking, however, this season would be considered the third and final season of play for them after they previously competed in the ABL as the Utica Pros before that team essentially was replaced by, if not reborn as, the Elmira Colonels for the previous season played. Regardless of their official status as a team, however, Elmira was meant to be one of eight teams competing in the ABL this season before the season started out with seven teams instead due to the Jersey City Titans dropping out of the league (and almost causing the original cancellation of this ABL season entirely) after they and the Colonels originally started out their preseason periods with players that had been involved with the 1951 college basketball point-shaving scandal. For Elmira's case, originally, they wanted to have 7'0" center Bill Spivey from the University of Kentucky compete with the team for their ABL roster, but after playing in a few exhibition games (both with and without the ABL's services in mind) with Spivey, the Colonels decided the risk with Spivey's inclusion ultimately just wasn't worth it and waived him from the team in order to return to the ABL in order to get their regular season back on track with only seven competitive teams instead. Despite them being without Bill Spivey for the rest of the season, the Elmira Colonels would still finish the season with an above-average 17–11 record while under player-coach Mike Novak (for the most part, with one loss on February 27, 1953 being credited by player-coach Ed Earle due to Novak being unavailable that day) for a third place finish behind only the defending ABL champion Wilkes-Barre Barons and the Manchester British-Americans.

Similar to the previous season's ABL Playoffs, Elmira would once again compete against the (now defending champion) Barons in the semifinal round under a best-of-seven series. However, while the results for the previous season's semifinal round are currently unknown outside of the overall status of the series as of 2026, this series would have its results be confirmed from the passage displayed on "Total Basketball: The Ultimate Basketball Encyclopedia" when covering the revived version of the original rendition of the ABL. In this semifinal round, Elmira and Wilkes-Barre would split the first four games played to tie it 2–2 (with Elmira winning the odd-numbered games played) before the Barons reversed the trend to have the Colonels win Game 6 instead of Games 5 and 7 in order for the defending champions to win the semifinal round 4–3 once again. However, unlike the previous season, the defending champion Wilkes-Barre Barons would fail to repeat as champions in the final season played in the ABL due to the British-Americans franchise sweeping the Barons 2–0 in the championship round. While the Elmira Colonels might have very well wanted to continue operating for another season (or more), (majority) team owner Harl Robacher would unexpectedly pass away from a heart attack in June 1953. That alongside a bunch of other factors beyond the league's control would lead to not just the Elmira Colonels folding operations as a franchise (thus prematurely ending the only major league sports team to have ever resided in the Southern Tier of the state of New York), but also resulted in the ABL deciding to suspend its operations for its planned 1953–54 season before shutting down operations entirely by the time its planned 1954–55 season was set to begin operations.

== Roster ==
Due to information on American Basketball League players being generally hard to find (especially by the time the ABL was designated more as a minor league during its later years of existence), there are bound to be more gaps and/or inaccuracies found in certain areas on the team's roster spots than usual.

Player	Position(s)
Jim Baechtold	G/F
Jim Brasco	G
Joe Colone	F
Ray Corley	G
Blaine Denning	G
Ed Earle	F
Jerry Fowler	C
John Gozdenovoch	Unknown
Jack Gushue	Unknown
Joel Kaufman	Unknown
Tony Kazokas	Unknown
Bobby Kelly	G
Leo Makovitch	Unknown
Larry Matthews	Unknown
Gary May	Unknown
Mike Novak	C/F
Hank Rosenstein	F
Buck Ross	Unknown
Don Savage	G/F
Frank Sebest	Unknown

Note: It's currently unknown what the team's official roster for the ABL Playoffs would be for this season.

== American Basketball League Standings ==
Pos.	Team	Wins	Losses	Win %
1	Manchester British-Americans - z	19	9	.679
2	Wilkes-Barre Barons - x	20	11	.550
3	Elmira Colonels*^{[a]} - x	17	11	.607
4	Scranton Miners*^{[b]} - x	12	11	.522
5	Pawtucket Slaters	6	19	.240
6	Middletown Guards†**^{[c]}	2	5	.286
7	Hazleton / Glen Falls-Saratoga Harlem Yankees†***^{[d]}	1	11	.083

* – Team briefly dropped out of the ABL during the season before returning to the league later on within the season.
** – The Middletown Guards dropped out of the ABL on January 8, 1953 and then disbanded as a franchise two days later on January 10, 1953.
*** – The Hazleton Harlem Yankees started their season out in Hazleton, Pennsylvania before they moved out two games into their season on December 4, 1952 to move back to Saratoga Springs, New York with games also played in Glen Falls, New York to become the Glen Falls-Saratoga Harlem Yankees for the rest of their season up until they ceased operations and withdrew operations on February 6, 1953.
† – Did not survive the ABL season.

== American Basketball League Playoffs ==
=== American Basketball League Semifinals ===
(3) Elmira Colonels Vs. (2) Wilkes-Barre Barons: Wilkes-Barre wins series 4–3

- Game 1: March 10, 1953 @ Wilkes-Barre: Elmira 91, Wilkes-Barre 85
- Game 2: March 12, 1953 @ Elmira: Wilkes-Barre 63, Elmira 56
- Game 3: March 14, 1953 @ Elmira: Elmira 74, Wilkes-Barre 71
- Game 4: March 15, 1953 @ Wilkes-Barre: Wilkes-Barre 90, Elmira 82
- Game 5: March 19, 1953 @ Wilkes-Barre: Wilkes-Barre 89, Elmira 81
- Game 6: March 21, 1953 @ Elmira: Elmira 63, Wilkes-Barre 60
- Game 7: March 22, 1953 @ Wilkes-Barre: Wilkes-Barre 75, Elmira 70

== Notes ==
^{a} The Elmira Colonels dropped out of the ABL on October 23, 1952 alongside the Jersey City Titans due to the Colonels having Bill Spivey on their roster at the time (with the Titans having multiple players that were previously a part of the 1951 college basketball point-shaving scandal themselves as well). Initially, the Colonels tried to be an exhibition team for the season, but after a few games, they decided to cut Bill Spivey from their roster in order to return to the ABL and have the league restart their season properly with seven teams playing throughout the season instead of eight teams playing this season.
^{b} The Scranton Miners previously dropped out of the ABL on December 20, 1952 due to original team owner Joe "Speed" Maloney charging other owners with evading the league's minimum guarantee of $300 per game before they reorganized themselves under a new group of management within late December 1952 before returning to the ABL by January 10, 1953, though Scranton would later withdraw operations from the league during the ABL's playoffs (with an impromptu forfeit defeat resulting in the Manchester British-Americans going into the championship round for this season) following a controversial ruling regarding a playoff match held on March 14, 1953.
^{c} The Middletown Guards dropped out of the ABL on January 8, 1953 and then disbanded as a franchise two days later on January 10, 1953.
^{d} The Hazleton Harlem Yankees started their season out in Hazleton, Pennsylvania before they moved out two games into their season on December 4, 1952 to move back to Saratoga Springs, New York with games also played in Glen Falls, New York to become the Glen Falls-Saratoga Harlem Yankees for the rest of their season up until they ceased operations and withdrew operations on February 6, 1953.
