= 1952–53 Jersey City Titans season =

- League: American Basketball League (revived original)
- Head coach: Pete Caruso
- General manager: Pete Caruso(?)
- Owner(s): Unknown (Pete Caruso?)
- Arena: Unknown (Jersey City Armory?)

Results
- Record: 0–0
- Place: Conference: N/A
- Playoff finish: Did not qualify. (Dropped out of the ABL on October 23, 1952 (a few days before the ABL's season was originally meant to begin).)

The 1952–53 Jersey City Titans season was a failed attempt at the first and only season of play for the Jersey City Titans for professional basketball on their ends when coming from Jersey City, New Jersey in the revived (yet clearly struggling) original version of the American Basketball League. Originally, the Titans were planned to be one of eight teams competing in the ABL in order for the league to continue starting their seasons out with eight competitive teams at least early on to start out their most recent seasons, to the point where Jersey City even played in some exhibition matches before the original starting point of this (final) ABL season was set to begin. However, the Titans ended up having four players that were considered permanently banned by the NBA due to the 1951 college basketball point-shaving scandal on their team (with former Indianapolis Olympians players Ralph Beard and Alex Groza alongside former LIU power forward/center Sherman White and Bradley University point guard Gene Melchiorre being the players in question that were on the team at the time), which the ABL did not like seeing since they wanted to keep a healthy relationship with the National Basketball Association to at least be a minor league for them by this point in time in their history (to further note how far the ABL had fallen by this point in time). The cause for concern upon the Titans' players in question (alongside the Elmira Colonels having Bill Spivey on their team) led to those two teams (initially) deciding to not just leave the ABL, but also result in the ABL initially cancelling this season of play on their ends entirely as well. However, while the Elmira Colonels decided to relent to the ABL's demands of letting go of Bill Spivey (and as a result, get the ABL back on track to completing what would later become its final season of existence), the Titans would not relent on the ABL's demands of letting go of those four players in question. This would not only result in the Jersey City Titans competing as an independent team for the rest of the season instead, but it also later led to them folding operations after a few more games as an independent team as well, with some of the Titans' players that weren't involved with fixing the NCAA's games during the late 1940s and early 1950s later playing for other ABL teams in its final season of existence(With that said, a majority of the roster would end up going to the Hazleton Mountaineers in the Eastern Professional Basketball League during the following season instead.). As a result of how this season went for them, it can be comparable to that of the failed ABA season that the Baltimore Claws had while competing in the American Basketball Association for what would have been its 1975–76 season (which coincidentally was also the final season of play for the ABA as well). Not only that, but the factor of players from the 1951 college basketball scandal (potentially) competing in the ABL for this season would end up leading to the league seeing its ultimate demise after this season concluded (though it wouldn't officially conclude operations until what would have been the start of its 1954–55 season instead).

== Roster ==
Due to information on American Basketball League players being generally hard to find (especially by the time the ABL was designated more as a minor league during its later years of existence), there are bound to be more gaps and/or inaccuracies found in certain areas on the team's roster spots than usual. Not only that, but this was intended to be what the team's planned roster was going to be like for this season before they left the ABL before its season was set to begin properly.

Player	Position(s)
Don Ackerman	PG
Ralph Beard	PG
Charles Bollinger	Unknown
Charlie Burns	Unknown
Gerald Calabrese	SG
John Gozdenovich	G
Alex Groza	C
Dick Hammond	Unknown
Gene Melchiorre	PG
Frank Sebest	Unknown
Tom Smith	PG/SG
William J. Strella	Unknown
Sherman White	PF/C

== American Basketball League Standings ==
Pos.	Team	Wins	Losses	Win %
1	Manchester British-Americans - z	19	9	.679
2	Wilkes-Barre Barons - x	20	11	.550
3	Elmira Colonels*^{[a]} - x	17	11	.607
4	Scranton Miners*^{[b]} - x	12	11	.522
5	Pawtucket Slaters	6	19	.240
6	Middletown Guards†**^{[c]}	2	5	.286
7	Hazleton / Glen Falls-Saratoga Harlem Yankees†***^{[d]}	1	11	.083
8	Jersey City Titans†****^{[e]}	0	0	.000

* – Team briefly dropped out of the ABL during the season before returning to the league later on within the season.
** – The Middletown Guards dropped out of the ABL on January 8, 1953 and then disbanded as a franchise two days later on January 10, 1953.
*** – The Hazleton Harlem Yankees started their season out in Hazleton, Pennsylvania before they moved out two games into their season on December 4, 1952 to move back to Saratoga Springs, New York with games also played in Glen Falls, New York to become the Glen Falls-Saratoga Harlem Yankees for the rest of their season up until they ceased operations and withdrew operations on February 6, 1953.
**** – The Jersey City Titans withdrew from the ABL before the (initial) start of the season began on October 23, 1952, with the Titans never returning to the league during the season due to them not accepting the league's terms and conditions for the season.
† – Did not survive the ABL season.

== Notes ==
^{a} The Elmira Colonels dropped out of the ABL on October 23, 1952 alongside the Jersey City Titans due to the Colonels having Bill Spivey on their roster at the time (with the Titans having multiple players that were previously a part of the 1951 college basketball point-shaving scandal themselves as well). Initially, the Colonels tried to be an exhibition team for the season, but after a few games, they decided to cut Bill Spivey from their roster in order to return to the ABL and have the league restart their season properly with seven teams playing throughout the season instead of eight teams playing this season.
^{b} The Scranton Miners previously dropped out of the ABL on December 20, 1952 due to original team owner Joe "Speed" Maloney charging other owners with evading the league's minimum guarantee of $300 per game before they reorganized themselves under a new group of management within late December 1952 before returning to the ABL by January 10, 1953, though Scranton would later withdraw operations from the league during the ABL's playoffs (with an impromptu forfeit defeat resulting in the Manchester British-Americans going into the championship round for this season) following a controversial ruling regarding a playoff match held on March 14, 1953.
^{c} The Middletown Guards dropped out of the ABL on January 8, 1953 and then disbanded as a franchise two days later on January 10, 1953.
^{d} The Hazleton Harlem Yankees started their season out in Hazleton, Pennsylvania before they moved out two games into their season on December 4, 1952 to move back to Saratoga Springs, New York with games also played in Glen Falls, New York to become the Glen Falls-Saratoga Harlem Yankees for the rest of their season up until they ceased operations and withdrew operations on February 6, 1953.
^{e} The Jersey City Titans withdrew from the ABL before the (initial) start of the season began on October 23, 1952, with the Titans never returning to the league during the season due to them not accepting the league's terms and conditions for the season.

== See also ==
- Baltimore Claws
