= 1950–51 Bridgeport Aer-A-Sols season =

American Basketball League season

- League: American Basketball League (revived original)
- Head coach: Jerry Rizzo (player-coach)
- General manager: Perry Pilotti
- Owner(s): Perry Pilotti(?)
- Arena: Bridgeport Armory

Results
- Record: 18–15 (.545)
- Place: Conference: 3rd/4th
- Playoff finish: ABL Playoffs were considered aborted due to the Utica Pros not wanting to compete against the Scranton Miners in the semifinal round alongside the lack of available armories for play in the playoffs this season. (The Scranton Miners were considered the ABL champions by default for this season due to their regular season record.)

The 1950–51 Bridgeport Aer-A-Sols season was officially the third professional basketball season for the team in Bridgeport, Connecticut currently known as the Aer-A-Sols (which was their second and final season under that name) after they previously competed as the Newfield Steelers in an independent manner in the 1948 World Professional Basketball Tournament and in the 1948–49 season in the revived (yet struggling) original version of the American Basketball League. Entering this season, Bridgeport would be one of seven teams competing in what would be considered the weakened up version of the ABL to compete for the league's championship under its 24th overall season of play. While the ABL initially would have most of its teams survive throughout the vast majority of its season, one team in the Wilkes-Barre Barons would end up leaving the ABL near the very end of the season due to the defending ABL champion Scranton Miners demanding a $1,500 bond from Eddie White, Sr.'s Barons team, which would cause a massive chain reaction toward the rest of the season's playoff picture not long afterward. With both the Bridgeport Aer-A-Sols and the Paterson Crescents starting to have home court issues this season due to them not having local armories to play professional basketball games in for the ABL Playoffs this season combined with the replacement playoff team for the season, the Utica Pros, not wanting to compete against the #1 seeded Scranton Miners due in part to their own financial issues, the ABL decided to ultimately cancel the ABL Playoffs entirely for the first and only time (or second time if one were to count the automatic championship won by the Wilmington Blue Bombers back in the 1941–42 season from the original split season format), with them later declaring the Scranton Miners the automatic champions by default due to them having the best record in the regular season (similar to what happened in an overall format with the 1941–42 Wilmington Blue Bombers that season). Unlike what would occur with the Crescents franchise, who ultimately folded their long-standing franchise by the end of the season, Bridgeport would end up securing a short-term deal with the tenants of the local Bridgeport Armory to compete once more in the 1951–52 season not long afterward, though the team would change their name to the Bridgeport Roesslers by then. Interestingly enough, this would also be the only professional season of play for former Manhattan College forward Jack Byrnes (alternatively known as John Byrnes), who was a key player that was involved in the 1951 college basketball point-shaving scandal before it led to 34 (later 35) players officially being involved in that scandal.

== Roster ==
Due to information on American Basketball League players being generally hard to find (especially by the time the ABL was designated more as a minor league during its later years of existence), there are bound to be more gaps and/or inaccuracies found in certain areas on the team's roster spots than usual.

Player	Position(s)
Bob Anderson	Unknown
Hank Baietti	G/F
Jackie Bowden	G/F
Jack Byrnes	F
Perry Del Purgatorio	G
Matty Forman	F/C
Jack Hewson	F/C
Dick Holub	C
Ralph Kaplowitz	G/F
Walt Kaplowitz	G
George Lindeman	Unknown
Mike McCarron	G
Tom Muller	Unknown
Jerry Rizzo	G
Tom Tolan	Unknown
"Big" John Wilson	F/C

== American Basketball League Standings ==
Pos.	Team	Wins	Losses	Win %
1	Scranton Miners	28	8	.778
2	Wilkes-Barre Barons^{×}^{[a]}	28	11	.718
3	Paterson Crescents	21	16	.568
4	Bridgeport Aer-A-Sols	18	15	.545
5	Utica Pros^{[b]}	17	22	.436
6	Saratoga Harlem Yankees	5	25	.167
7	Allentown / Carbondale Aces^{[c]}	4	24	.105

× – Withdrew from the ABL this season on February 22, 1951, following a $1,500 bond demand from the Scranton Miners.
* – The Allentown Aces moved from Allentown, Pennsylvania to nearby Carbondale, Pennsylvania during the season on December 28, 1950, following a 1–12 start to their season.

== Aborted American Basketball League Playoffs ==
Originally, the ABL intended to have a proper playoff series occur with the best four teams in the league competing against each other in something similar to what the formerly rivaling National Basketball League had done in certain seasons without divisions at hand where the best four teams of the season would compete against each other (in this case, had the Wilkes-Barre Barons not left the ABL left in the season, it would have had the defending ABL champion Scranton Miners competing against the recently rebranded Bridgeport Aer-A-Sols and the Wilkes-Barre Barons would have competed against the Paterson Crescents for this season). However, because Wilkes-Barre unexpectedly withdrew from the ABL late in the season on February 22, 1951, due to a $1,500 bond demand from Scranton themselves, the planned ABL playoffs had Scranton going up against the new Utica Pros expansion team (who took on the fourth place spot in the ABL officially for this season) and the Paterson Crescents would go up against the Bridgeport Aer-A-Sols as the new #2 Vs. #3 seeded match-up. However, before the ABL playoffs were planned to begin, Utica voted to not participate in the planned (alternative) playoff set-up against Scranton; that surprising vote combined with the lack of armories for teams to compete in during a planned playoff tournament for the ABL (specifically for both Bridgeport and Paterson) led to the league scrapping the ABL playoffs entirely this time around (which would be somewhat similar to what happened in their 1941–42 season), with the Scranton Miners being crowned the two-time champions of the ABL following this decision. This failure by the ABL's hands would help further lead to the ABL's decline and then conclusion that happened in the 1950s decade, as well as help lead to the Paterson Crescents leaving the ABL by the end of this season alongside the aforementioned Utica Pros, though it's suggested that the Utica Pros would become the Elmira Colonels instead.

== Notes ==
^{a} The Wilkes-Barre Barons withdrew from the ABL this season on February 22, 1951 (a fair amount of time before the planned ABL playoffs were meant to begin) following a $1,500 bond demand from the Scranton Miners.
^{b} The Utica Pros were named the replacement team to enter what would have been the 1951 ABL Playoffs had they been able to begin properly, with Utica being the (new) #4 seed for the season while the Bridgeport Aer-A-Sols were named the new #3 seed instead of being the #4 seed and the Paterson Crescents were named the new #2 seed instead of being the #3 seed for this season.
^{c} The Allentown Aces moved from Allentown, Pennsylvania to nearby Carbondale, Pennsylvania during the season on December 28, 1950, following a 1–12 start to their season to become the Carbondale Aces for the rest of the season.
