= 1951–52 Elmira Colonels season =

American Basketball League season

- League: American Basketball League (revived original)
- Head coach: Fuzzy Levane
- General manager: Harl Robacher
- Owner(s): Harl Robacher
- Arena: Elmira Armory

Results
- Record: 22–18 (.550)
- Place: Conference: 2nd
- Playoff finish: Did not qualify

The 1951–52 Elmira Colonels season was officially considered the first season of play for the Elmira Colonels (not to be confused with the Elmira Colonels that competed in the minor New York-Pennsylvania Basketball League in their spare time while also competing in the more major National Basketball League as the Warren Penns / Cleveland White Horses) that competed in Elmira, New York in the revived (yet struggling) original version of the American Basketball League. Unofficially speaking, however, this season would be considered the second season of play for them after they previously competed in the ABL as the Utica Pros before that team essentially was replaced by, if not reborn as, the Elmira Colonels for this season. Regardless of their official status as a team, however, Elmira would not only become the first (and currently only) major league sports team to have ever resided in the Southern Tier of the state of New York, but they would also enter this season as one of seven (later eight) teams that would be competing in the ABL throughout the season, though it would devolve downward to only six remaining teams by the end of the season. Despite their young team status at hand, the Colonels would surprisingly become the second-best team in the ABL with an above-average 22–18 record that only put them behind the two-time defending champion Scranton Miners, which resulted in Elmira easily qualifying in the returning ABL Playoffs for this season. For their semifinal round match-up, instead of competing against the #4 seeded Saratoga Harlem Yankees (who briefly competed as the Schenectady (Harlem) Yankees during the season before ending their season with a losing record), the Colonels would go up against the #3 seeded Wilkes-Barre Barons (who barely had an above-average record this season) in a best-of-seven series. Unfortunately for Elmira, the experience that Wilkes-Barre had due to them being former two-time ABL champions (three-time champions when including their inaugural championship won in the EPBL) would ultimately prove to be too much for the Colonels, as the Barons would not only upset Elmira 4–3 in the semifinal round, but also win the ABL's championship not long afterward.

== Roster ==
Due to information on American Basketball League players being generally hard to find (especially by the time the ABL was designated more as a minor league during its later years of existence), there are bound to be more gaps and/or inaccuracies found in certain areas on the team's roster spots than usual.

Player	Position(s)
Greek Athas	G
Leroy Chollet	F
Red Dehnert	F
Jerry Fowler	C
Paul "Spike" Gerwin	Unknown
Sam Lackeye	Unknown
Andrew Levane	G/F
Al Masino	G
Mike McCarron	PG
Leo Mogus	F/C
Paul Noel	F
Mike Novak	C/F
Mauro Panaggio	Unknown
John Rennicke	G
Don Savage	G/F
Dick Supronowicz	Unknown
Joe Tubiolo	Unknown

Note: In addition to those players, there would also be an unknown player with the last name of Stocknick who would briefly be on the team as well. Not only that, but it's also unknown for what the team's official playoff roster would be for this season.

== American Basketball League Standings ==
Pos.	Team	Wins	Losses	Win %
1	Scranton Miners - z	24	11	.686
2	Elmira Colonels - x	22	18	.550
3	Wilkes-Barre Barons - x	20	19	.513
4	Saratoga Harlem Yankees / Schenectady Yankees / Saratoga Harlem Yankees*^{[a]} - x	12	16	.429
5	Manchester British-Americans**^{[b]}	8	11	.421
6	Bridgeport Roesslers	9	22	.290
7	Washington Capitols†^{[c]}	15	7	.682
8	Carbondale Aces/Middletown Guards†***^{[d]}	7	13	.350

* – The Schenectady Yankees originally moved out of Saratoga, New York to nearby Schenectady, New York on January 15, 1952 to become the Schenectady Harlem Yankees for a few games before moving back to Saratoga for the rest of their season on February 5, 1952.
** – The Manchester British-Americans joined the ABL's season on New Year's Day in 1952 after previously playing their season in Connecticut's Eastern Basketball League.
*** – According to Total Basketball: The Ultimate Basketball Encyclopedia, the Carbondale Aces might have changed their team name to the Carbondale Big Chiefs at some point during the season. Regardless of whether the Aces did do that or not, the Carbondale franchise would ultimately end up folding their operations on January 20, 1952, with their original 6–8 record being picked up by the Middletown Guards, who ended up going 1–5 on their ends for a combined 7–13 record before they ended up dropping out of the ABL themselves on February 21, 1952.
† – Did not survive the ABL season.

== American Basketball League Playoffs ==
=== American Basketball League Semifinals ===
(2) Elmira Colonels Vs. (3) Wilkes-Barre Barons: Wilkes-Barre wins series 4–3

== Notes ==
^{a} The Schenectady Yankees originally moved out of Saratoga, New York to nearby Schenectady, New York on January 15, 1952 to become the Schenectady Harlem Yankees for a few games before moving back to Saratoga for the rest of their season on February 5, 1952.
^{b} The Manchester British-Americans joined the ABL's season on New Year's Day in 1952 after previously playing their season in Connecticut's Eastern Basketball League.
^{c} The Washington Capitols in the ABL this season would be the same team that previously folded operations from the NBA in their 1950–51 season. However, the Capitols would fold operations on January 11, 1952 (this time, folding operations for good despite their 15–7 record at the time) due to the NBA threatening to sue the Capitols team and the ABL alike if the Capitols team were to use the same team history as the former BAA/NBA team despite the Washington Capitols technically having history with the ABL first due to them existing as a team in 1944 before becoming the Paterson Crescents in 1945.
^{d} According to Total Basketball: The Ultimate Basketball Encyclopedia, the Carbondale Aces might have changed their team name to the Carbondale Big Chiefs at some point during the season. Regardless of whether the Aces did do that or not, the Carbondale franchise would ultimately end up folding their operations on January 20, 1952, with their original 6–8 record being picked up by the Middletown Guards, who ended up going 1–5 on their ends for a combined 7–13 record before they ended up dropping out of the ABL themselves on February 21, 1952.
