= 1975–76 Baltimore Claws season =

Aborted ABA basketball team season

- Head coach: Joe Mullaney
- Arena: Baltimore Civic Arena

Results
- Record: 0–0
- Place: Division: N/A (Eastern); Conference: N/A
- Playoff finish: N/A

The 1975–76 American Basketball Association season saw the quick demise of the Baltimore Claws franchise, with them folding operations five days before the start of what was to become the final regular season period for the ABA. Had the Claws played even one regular season game before then, this would have been their ninth and final season as a franchise after previously going by the New Orleans Buccaneers, Memphis Pros, Memphis Tams, and Memphis Sounds, as well as their first and only season they would have played in Baltimore, Maryland after previously playing in New Orleans, Louisiana and Memphis, Tennessee.

== Offseason ==
=== ABA Draft ===
Round	Pick	Player	Position(s)	Nationality	College
1	3	Lonnie Shelton	PF/C	United States	North Carolina State
2	13	Rich Kelley	C/PF	United States	Stanford
3	23	Ron Haigler	PF	United States	Pennsylvania
4	33	Glenn Hansen	SG	United States	LSU
5	43	Walter Luckett	SG	United States	Ohio
6	53	Terry Furlow	SG/SF	United States	Michigan State
7	63	Rick Whitlow	PG	United States	Illinois State
8	73	John Murphy	F	United States	Massachusetts

The selections made during this draft were made back when the franchise was still going by the Memphis Sounds name.

=== Preseason transactions ===
On August 27, 1975, the Memphis Sounds franchise was dismantled and sold to a group of Baltimore businessmen headed by David Cohan. The franchise moved to Baltimore. It was first called the Baltimore Hustlers but the league objected to the name so the team was quickly rechristened as the Baltimore Claws.

On September 19, 1975, the Claws obtained star center Dan Issel from the Kentucky Colonels, the team that won the 1975 ABA Championship.

The Claws also traded guard Rick Mount to the Utah Stars for guards Joe Hamilton and Tim van Blommesteyn.

The Claws signed Skip Wise, the 6'3" star guard from Clemson University who the prior year became the first freshman ever to be named First Team All-ACC while averaging 18.9 points per game.

=== Preseason exhibition games ===
The Claws played their first game, a preseason exhibition, in Salisbury, Maryland, on October 9, 1975, against the Virginia Squires. The Squires won 131–121; attendance was reported at 1,150.

Two days later the Claws lost to the NBA's Philadelphia 76ers 103–82 in Cherry Hill, New Jersey.

On October 17, 1975, the Claws played the Squires again, this time at Knott Arena, Mt. St. Mary's College, Emmitsburg, Maryland. The Squires won 100–88 in front of approximately 500 spectators.

==== Demise ====
The Claws only managed to sign up 300 season ticket holders. The franchise constantly had money problems. On October 16, 1975, ABA Commissioner Dave DeBusschere gave the Claws four days to send $500,000 to the ABA league office as a "performance bond" for team operations. While their players went unpaid, the Claws sent $250,000 of this amount. On October 20, 1975, five days before the start of the 1975–76 regular season, the ABA folded the Baltimore Claws.

== Regular season ==
The Claws folded prior to the start of the regular season.

=== Roster ===
- George Carter
- Mel Daniels
- Scott English
- Joe Hamilton
- Stew Johnson
- Bob Rhodes
- Dave Robisch
- Skip Rozenski
- Paul Ruffner
- Tony Styles
- Claude Terry
- Tim van Blommesteyn
- Chuck Williams
- Skip Wise

The above would have been the Baltimore Claws' regular season roster had the team continued into regular season play.

=== Season standings ===
Team	W	L	PCT.	GB
Denver Nuggets *	60	24	.714	—
**New York Nets** *	55	29	.655	5
San Antonio Spurs *	50	34	.595	10
Kentucky Colonels *	46	38	.548	14
Indiana Pacers *	39	45	.464	21
Spirits of St. Louis	35	49	.417	25
Virginia Squires †	15	68	.181	44
San Diego Sails †	3	8	.273	—
Utah Stars †	4	12	.250	—
Baltimore Claws †	0	0	.000	—

Asterisk (*) denotes playoff team
† did not survive the end of the season.
Bold – ABA champions

== Player statistics ==
=== Legend ===
- GP: Games played
- GS: Games started
- MPG: Minutes per game
- FG%: Field goal percentage
- 3FG%: 3-point field goal percentage
- FT%: Free throw percentage
- RPG: Rebounds per game
- APG: Assists per game
- SPG: Steals per game
- BPG: Blocks per game
- PPG: Points per game

=== Season ===
Player	GP	GS	MPG	FG%	3FG%	FT%	RPG	APG	SPG	BPG	PPG

== Transactions ==
=== Draft and preseason signings ===
Signed Skip Wise of Clemson University to a five-year, $1,000,000 contract

Drafted:

- Lonnie Shelton (stayed in college)
- Rich Kelley (signed with NBA's New Orleans Jazz)
- Terry Furlow (stayed in college)

=== Trades ===
- September 19, 1975: traded Tom Owens and $500,000 cash to the Kentucky Colonels for Dan Issel
- September 1975: traded Dan Issel to the Denver Nuggets for Dave Robisch and $500,000 cash
- Traded Rick Mount to the Utah Stars for Joe Hamilton and Tim van Blommesteyn

Dispersal Draft:

- Alex English (Indiana Pacers)
- Joe Hamilton (Utah Stars)
- Stew Johnson (San Diego Sails)
- Dave Robisch (Spirits of St. Louis)
- Paul Ruffner (Spirits of St. Louis)
- Claude Terry (Denver Nuggets)
- Chuck Williams (Virginia Squires)

== See also ==
- 1952–53 Jersey City Titans, another team to only play in exhibition games for a soon-to-be-defunct league before leaving said league and going defunct days before beginning its regular season
