= 1949–50 Bridgeport Aer-A-Sols season =

American Basketball League season

- League: American Basketball League (revived original)
- Head coach: Perry Pilotti
- General manager: Perry Pilotti
- Owner(s): Perry Pilotti(?)
- Arena: Bridgeport Armory

Results
- Record: 22–13 (.629)
- Place: Conference: 2nd
- Playoff finish: Lost ABL championship series 3–2 to the Scranton Miners.

The 1949–50 Bridgeport Aer-A-Sols season was officially the second professional basketball season for the team in Bridgeport, Connecticut currently known as the Aer-A-Sols (which was their first season under that name) after they previously competed as the Newfield Steelers in an independent manner in the 1948 World Professional Basketball Tournament and in their previous season in the revived (yet struggling) original version of the American Basketball League. Entering this season, Bridgeport would once again be one of eight teams competing in the league to start out the season, although it would later conclude with only six teams remaining in the ABL by the end of the season. While working with new sponsors to help promote the team throughout the season (in this case, the company that helped promote the Aer-A-Sol spray dispenser cans), Bridgeport would see themselves improve under much better and more consistent play throughout this season than they had under their previous season in the ABL with an above-average 22–13 record for a second place finish behind only the Scranton Miners. For the team's first ever (proper) playoff appearance in the ABL, the Aer-A-Sols would see themselves go up against the New York turned Saratoga Harlem Yankees, an all-black team that held the honor of being the second fully integrated team to ever compete in a league that was previously considered all-white at the time (with the first being the now-defunct Dayton Rens from the since-defunct National Basketball League) due to racial segregation in the United States. Both Bridgeport and Saratoga would split the first two games in a tense semifinal round series before the Aer-A-Sols won the decisive Game 3 with a close 75–73 victory at home to qualify for the championship series against the Scranton Miners. Bridgeport would have a shot at upsetting the Miners when the tied the series 2–2 each after they were previously down 2–0 in the championship round, but the Aer-A-Sols would fail to complete the reverse sweep when Scranton would win the decisive Game 5 with a blowout 85–59 final score over the Aer-A-Sols, thus denying Bridgeport their best shot at winning the ABL's championship in the process.

== Roster ==
Due to information on American Basketball League players being generally hard to find (especially by the time the ABL was designated more as a minor league during its later years of existence), there are bound to be more gaps and/or inaccuracies found in certain areas on the team's roster spots than usual.

| Player | Position(s) |
|---|---|
| Hank Baietti | G/F |
| Aubrey Cole | Unknown |
| Jack Hewson | F/C |
| Mickey Homa | F |
| Ernie Johnson | G/F |
| George Kok | C |
| George Petrovick | G |
| Marty Powers | Unknown |
| Jerry Rizzo | G |
| Red Speicher | Unknown |
| Tom Tolan | Unknown |
| "Big" John Wilson | F/C |
| Bill Zirkel | G |

It's currently unknown what the team's roster for the ABL Playoffs for this season was.

== American Basketball League Standings ==
| Pos. | Team | Wins | Losses | Win % |
|---|---|---|---|---|
| 1 | Scranton Miners | 27 | 11 | .711 |
| 2 | Bridgeport Aer-A-Sols | 22 | 13 | .629 |
| 3 | Wilkes-Barre Barons | 21 | 17 | .552 |
| 4 | New York / Saratoga Harlem Yankees*^{[a]} | 21 | 17 | .552 |
| 5 | Paterson Crescents | 17 | 18 | .486 |
| 6 | Hartford Hurricanes | 11 | 26 | .297 |
| 7 | Trenton Tigers / Cohoes Marras**†^{[b]} | 4 | 16 | .200 |
| 8 | Schenectady Packers†^{[c]} | 0 | 4 | .000 |

† – Did not survive the ABL season.
* – The New York Harlem Yankees moved to Saratoga, New York (though they presumably played some of their games in Schenectady, New York) during the season.
** – The Trenton Tigers would end up moving to Cohoes, New York after being without a home venue for a month straight before later folding operations without winning a single game in Cohoes under their new Cohoes Marras name.

== American Basketball League Playoffs ==
=== American Basketball League Semifinals ===
(2) Bridgeport Aer-A-Sols Vs. (4) Saratoga Harlem Yankees: Bridgeport wins series 2–1

- Game 1: March 26, 1950 @ Bridgeport: Bridgeport 81, Saratoga 78
- Game 2: March 27, 1950 @ Saratoga: Saratoga 80, Bridgeport 78
- Game 3: March 29, 1950 @ Bridgeport: Bridgeport 75, Saratoga 73

=== American Basketball League Championship Series ===
(2) Bridgeport Aer-A-Sols Vs. (1) Scranton Miners: Scranton wins series 3–2

- Game 1: April 2, 1950 @ Scranton: Scranton 88, Bridgeport 67
- Game 2: April 9, 1950 @ Bridgeport: Scranton 85, Bridgeport 73
- Game 3: April 12, 1950 @ Scranton: Bridgeport 68, Scranton 65
- Game 4: April 14, 1950 @ Bridgeport: Bridgeport 78, Scranton 73
- Game 5: April 16, 1950 @ Scranton: Scranton 85, Bridgeport 59

== Notes ==
^{a} The New York Harlem Yankees moved to Saratoga, New York (though they presumably played some of their games in Schenectady, New York) to become the Saratoga Harlem Yankees at some currently unknown point in time during this season.
^{b} The Trenton Tigers would move to Cohoes, New York to become the Cohoes Marras on January 7, 1950 after previously playing as a road team only from December 11-28, 1949 (with their road trip leading to nothing but defeats) before the Trenton Tigers turned Cohoes Marras folded operations by either January 30 or February 1, 1950.
^{c} The Schenectady Packers would end up dropping out of the ABL on November 23, 1949.
