= 1948–49 Bridgeport Newfield Steelers season =

American Basketball League season

- League: American Basketball League (revived original)
- Head coach: Perry Pilotti
- General manager: Perry Pilotti
- Owner(s): Perry Pilotti(?)
- Arena: Bridgeport Armory

Results
- Record: 24–17 (.585)
- Place: Conference: T–4th
- Playoff finish: Did not qualify. (Lost fourth place tiebreaker match to the Paterson Crescents with a 99–80 defeat.)

The 1948–49 Bridgeport Newfield Steelers season was officially the first professional basketball season for the team currently known as the Newfield Steelers after they previously competed in an independent manner in the 1948 World Professional Basketball Tournament (where they lost to the all-black New York Renaissance in the first round, who ended up being the runners-up for that event behind the Minneapolis Lakers). Entering this season, Bridgeport would be one of eight teams competing in the league for this season in a time where the long-standing Philadelphia SPHAs would move to Atlantic City, New Jersey to originally become the Atlantic City Tides before becoming the SPHAs once again for the rest of the season by January 1949, though the Newfield Steelers would replace the Lancaster (Red) Roses team that moved from the major ABL to the minor EPBL earlier in the previous season. Initially, Bridgeport would prove their worth regarding their promotion from being an independent team (that would apparently previously compete in the minor New England Basketball League at one point in time) to being a professional ABL team by winning their first seven games played in the season (including a game won against the similarly hot Atlantic City Tides). However, similar to the hot streak that the Tides had early on, the Newfield Steelers would end up cooling down on their play for the rest of the season, though unlike the Atlantic City Tides turned Philadelphia SPHAs, Bridgeport would end up tying with the Paterson Crescents for a fourth place finish with a 24–17 record that put the Newfield Steelers ahead of the Atlantic City Tides turned Philadelphia SPHAs, Brooklyn Gothams, and Hartford Hurricanes / Caps, but behind the defending ABL champion Trenton Tigers, the Scranton Miners, and the inaugural EPBL champion Wilkes-Barre Barons. Due to the tied fourth place finish, Bridgeport and Paterson would compete in a tiebreaker match to determine who would qualify for the final playoff spot in the ABL this season. Unfortunately for the Newfield Steelers, they would get crushed by the Crescents in the tiebreaker match with a 99–80 final score, thus eliminating the Bridgeport Newfield Steelers from their shot at competing in the ABL Playoffs properly this season.

== Roster ==
Due to information on American Basketball League players being generally hard to find (especially by the time the ABL was designated more as a minor league during its later years of existence), there are bound to be more gaps and/or inaccuracies found in certain areas on the team's roster spots than usual.

Player	Position(s)
Jackie Bowden	G/F
Jim Cascia	Unknown
Zeke Fazekas	G
Tom Flanagan	F/C
Ernie Gomez	F
Mickey Homa	F
Ernie Johnson	G/F
Paul Klapprodt	Unknown
Bill Kotsores	Unknown
Ace Lengyel	Unknown
Ted Nicksick	Unknown
Joe Oslai	F
George Petrovick	G
Guinn Phillips	Unknown
Marty Powers	Unknown
Johnny Rusinko	Unknown
Jim Springer	C
Buddy Thompson	Unknown
"Big" John Wilson	F/C
"Little" John Wilson	G
Bill Zirkel	G

== American Basketball League Standings ==
Pos.	Team	Wins	Losses	Win %
1	Wilkes-Barre Barons	29	12	.707
2	Scranton Miners	26	15	.634
3	Trenton Tigers	25	16	.610
T–4	Paterson Crescents	24	17	.585
T–4	Bridgeport Newfield Steelers	24	17	.585
6	Hartford Hurricanes / Caps	13	26	.333
7	Brooklyn Gothams	10	30	.250
8	Atlantic City Tides / Philadelphia SPHAs^{[a]}	8	26	.235

The Paterson Crescents would defeat the Bridgeport Newfield Steelers 99–80 on March 26, 1949 in the fourth place tiebreaker match for the season, which would ensure their qualification for the 1949 ABL Playoffs for this season.

== American Basketball League Playoffs ==
=== American Basketball League Fourth Place Tiebreaker ===
Before the ABL began their playoffs properly, the ABL would schedule a fourth place tiebreaker playoff match between the Paterson Crescents and the Bridgeport Newfield Steelers on March 26, 1949. Unfortunately for Bridgeport, they would end up being crushed by Paterson with a 99–80 defeat in the only game played for that series, meaning that the Crescents would win the final playoff spot for the season by default and the Newfield Steelers would have their season ended early with this essentially being their elimination from the ABL Playoffs for this season.

== Notes ==
^{a} Before this season began, the Philadelphia Sphas moved from Philadelphia, Pennsylvania to Atlantic City, New Jersey to become the Atlantic City Tides in an effort to survive for the long-term. However, after having disappointing attendance results for home games at the Million Dollar Pier in Atlantic City, the team returned to Philadelphia to become the Sphas once again for the rest of the season going forward into their existence on January 16, 1949, with them playing their final home games as a professional basketball team back at their primary home court in the ballroom area of the Broadwood Hotel.
