= Zeke Sinicola =

American basketball player

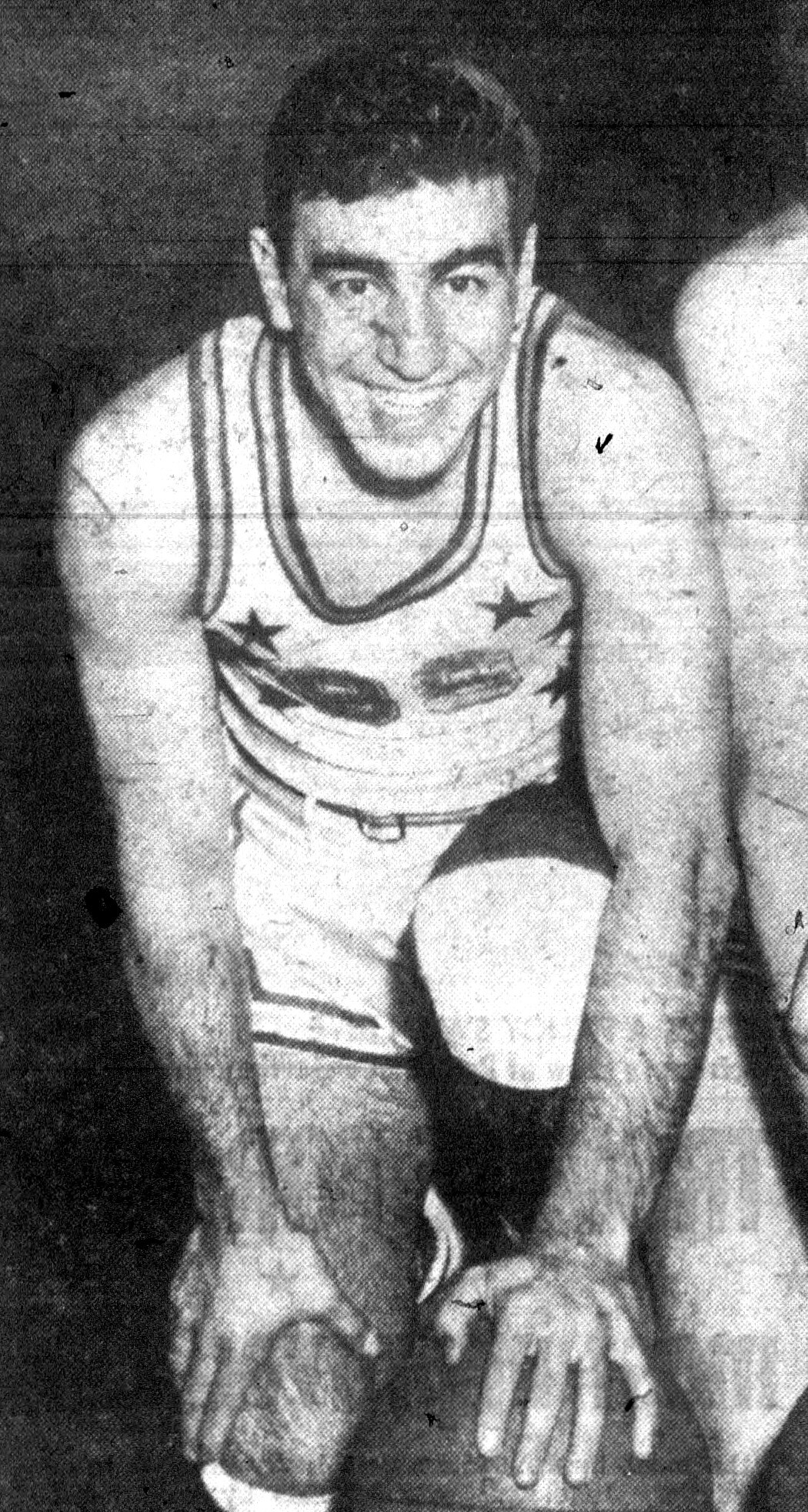
- Sinicola, circa 1951

Personal information
- Born: January 25, 1929 New York City, New York, U.S.
- Died: June 6, 2011 (aged 82) New York City, New York, U.S.
- Listed height: 5 ft 10 in (1.78 m)
- Listed weight: 165 lb (75 kg)

Career information
- High school: Benjamin Franklin (New York City, New York)
- College: Niagara (1948–1951)
- NBA draft: 1951: 1st round, 4th overall pick
- Drafted by: Fort Wayne Pistons
- Playing career: 1951–1961
- Position: Guard
- Number: 4, 5

Career history
- 1951; 1953: Fort Wayne Pistons
- 1955–1956: Hazleton Pros
- 1955–1956: Trenton Capitols / New York-Harlem Yankees
- 1956–1958: Scranton Miners
- 1957–1959: Williamsport Billies
- 1958–1959: Hazleton Pros
- 1960–1961: Williamsport Billies

Career highlights
- EPBL champion (1957); All-EPBL First Team (1956); 2× All-EPBL Second Team (1957, 1958); No. 19 retired by Niagara Purple Eagles

Career NBA statistics
- Points: 13 (1.1 ppg)
- Rebounds: 2 (.2 rpg)
- Assists: 3 (.3 apg)
- Stats at NBA.com
- Stats at Basketball Reference

Emilio Joseph "Zeke" Sinicola (January 25, 1929 – June 6, 2011) was an American professional basketball player. He played on the collegiate level at Niagara University and was an NCAA Men's Basketball All-American. In the early 1950s he played for the Fort Wayne Pistons of the National Basketball Association.

He was a teammate of Isaac Walthour at Benjamin Franklin High School in New York City.

Sinicola played in the Eastern Professional Basketball League (EPBL) for the Hazleton Pros, Trenton Capitols / New York-Harlem Yankees, Scranton Miners and Williamsport Billies from 1955 to 1961. He won an EPBL championship with the Miners in 1957. Sinicola was selected to the All-EPBL First Team in 1956 and Second Team in 1957 and 1958.

== Career statistics ==
Legend
GP	Games played	GS	Games started	MPG	Minutes per game
FG%	Field goal percentage	3P%	3-point field goal percentage	FT%	Free throw percentage
RPG	Rebounds per game	APG	Assists per game	SPG	Steals per game
BPG	Blocks per game	PPG	Points per game	**Bold**	Career high

=== NBA ===
==== Regular season ====
Year	Team	GP	MPG	FG%	FT%	RPG	APG	PPG
1951–52	Fort Wayne	3	**5.0**	**.250**	.000	**.3**	.0	.7
1953–54	Fort Wayne	**9**	3.7	**.250**	**.500**	.1	**.3**	**1.2**
Career		12	4.0	.250	.375	.2	.3	1.1
