= Ed Earle =

American basketball player (1927–2009)

Personal information
- Born: April 28, 1927 Chicago, Illinois
- Died: March 26, 2009 (aged 81)
- Listed height: 6 ft 3 in (1.91 m)
- Listed weight: 190 lb (86 kg)

Career information
- High school: Schurz (Chicago, Illinois)
- College: Loyola Chicago (1946–1950)
- NBA draft: 1950: undrafted
- Position: Power forward
- Number: 6

Career history
- 1952–1953: Elmira Colonels
- 1953: Syracuse Nationals
- 1954–1955: Wilkes-Barre Barons
- Stats at NBA.com
- Stats at Basketball Reference

Edwin Graffan Earle (April 28, 1927 – March 26, 2009) was an American professional basketball player. A power forward, Earle attended Loyola University of Chicago, where he scored 1,018 points in 119 games. He was Loyola's second 1,000-point scorer, following Jack Kerris. During his junior season, he contributed 9.4 points per game and helped the Ramblers to a 25–6 overall record and a runner-up finish at the National Invitation Tournament. As a senior in 1949–1950, he averaged 10.0 points per game. He was later inducted into the school's hall of fame.

In July 1950, he signed with the Sheboygan Redskins of the National Professional Basketball League. He was waived on October 31, 1950. In 1952–1953, he played for the Elmira Colonels in the American Basketball League, averaging 12.6 pints in 28 games. In August 1953, Earle signed with the Syracuse Nationals of the National Basketball Association (NBA) where he went on to appear in two games during the 1953–54 season. In 1954, he joined the Wilkes-Barre Barons in the Eastern Professional Basketball League where he averaged 11.6 points in 8 games. Earle also played on teams of former college players in exhibition games against the Harlem Globetrotters.

Earle also distinguished himself in 16-inch softball, and is a member of the Chicago 16 Inch Softball Hall of Fame. He spent 26 years with the Yellow Freight Corporation.

== Career statistics ==
Legend
GP	Games played	GS	Games started	MPG	Minutes per game
FG%	Field goal percentage	3P%	3-point field goal percentage	FT%	Free throw percentage
RPG	Rebounds per game	APG	Assists per game	SPG	Steals per game
BPG	Blocks per game	PPG	Points per game	**Bold**	Career high

=== NBA ===
==== Regular season ====
Year	Team	GP	MPG	FG%	FT%	RPG	APG	PPG
1953–54	Syracuse	2	6.0	.500	.500	1.0	.0	2.0
