= Blaine Denning =

American basketball player (1930–2016)

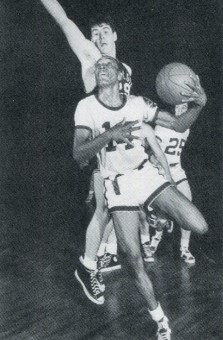
- Denning as a senior at Lawrence Tech

Personal information
- Born: September 19, 1930 Fulton, Kentucky, U.S.
- Died: January 25, 2016 (aged 85) Detroit, Michigan, U.S.
- Listed height: 6 ft 2 in (1.88 m)
- Listed weight: 175 lb (79 kg)

Career information
- High school: Northern (Detroit, Michigan)
- College: Wilberforce (1948–1949); Lawrence Tech (1949–1952)
- NBA draft: 1952: 4th round
- Drafted by: Baltimore Bullets
- Position: Point guard

Career history
- 1952: Harlem Globetrotters
- 1952–1953: Elmira Colonels
- 1952: Baltimore Bullets

Career highlights
- No. 14 retired by Lawrence Tech
- Stats at NBA.com
- Stats at Basketball Reference

Blaine Denning Sr. (born Blaine Mitchell Jr.; September 19, 1930 – January 25, 2016) was an American professional basketball player. He played college basketball at Lawrence Technological University and was inducted into their athletic hall of fame. He played professionally for the Harlem Globetrotters, Elmira Colonels of the American Basketball League, and Baltimore Bullets of the National Basketball Association (NBA).

== High school career ==
Denning attended Northern High School in Detroit, Michigan, where he was an All-State second team player in 1948.

== College career ==
Denning played college basketball for the Lawrence Tech Blue Devils from 1949 to 1952. He was the team's leading scorer during the 1950–51 season. Denning had his best season in 1951–52 as a senior, when he scored 589 points in 28 games, averaging 21 points per game. He helped lead the Blue Devils to the semifinals of the 1952 NAIA tournament. He was inducted into the Lawrence Tech Athletic Hall of Fame in 2011, and his number 14 was retired by the team.

== Professional career ==
In April 1952, Denning played for the Harlem Globetrotters. Later in the same month, he was selected in the 1952 NBA draft by the Baltimore Bullets. He was unable to showcase his skills beyond a few exhibition games. Although he was waived by the Bullets two days before the opening of their 1952–53 season, Denning was reinstated to their negotiation list after going unclaimed. He played for the Elmira Colonels of the American Basketball League until he was recalled by the Bullets. He played just one game for the Bullets in December 1952; he scored five points and grabbed four rebounds.

In September 1953, Denning was invited to tryout for the Bullets, but in beginning of October, he was released along with nine other players.

== Career statistics ==
Legend
GP	Games played	GS	Games started	MPG	Minutes per game
FG%	Field goal percentage	3P%	3-point field goal percentage	FT%	Free throw percentage
RPG	Rebounds per game	APG	Assists per game	SPG	Steals per game
BPG	Blocks per game	PPG	Points per game	**Bold**	Career high

=== NBA ===
==== Regular season ====
Year	Team	GP	MPG	FG%	FT%	RPG	APG	PPG
1952–53	Baltimore	1	9.0	.400	1.000	4.0	.0	5.0
