= Roy Reardon =

Australian rules footballer

Personal information
- Full name: Royce Raymond Reardon
- Born: 22 April 1894; Forcett, Tasmania
- Died: 8 January 1968 (aged 73); Inverloch, Victoria
- Height: 175 cm (5 ft 9 in)
- Weight: 78 kg (172 lb)

Playing career^{1}
| Years | Club | Games (Goals) |
| 1920–21 | South Melbourne | 13 (11) |
- ^{1} Playing statistics correct to the end of 1921.

Royce Raymond Reardon (22 April 1894 – 8 January 1968) was an Australian rules footballer who played with South Melbourne in the Victorian Football League (VFL).
