= Jim Springer =

American basketball player

Personal information
- Born: June 17, 1926 Roachdale, Indiana, U.S.
- Died: February 19, 2018 (aged 91) Indianapolis, Indiana, U.S.
- Listed height: 6 ft 9 in (2.06 m)
- Listed weight: 235 lb (107 kg)

Career information
- High school: New Winchester (New Winchester, Indiana)
- College: Indiana State (1944–1945); Canterbury (1945–1947)
- Playing career: 1947–1952
- Position: Center

Career history
- 1947: Anderson Duffey Packers
- 1947–1948: Indianapolis Kautskys
- 1948: Indianapolis Jets
- 1948–1949: Bridgeport Newfield Steelers
- 1951–1952: Bridgeport Roesslers
- Stats at NBA.com
- Stats at Basketball Reference

James Elmer Springer (June 17, 1926 - February 19, 2018) was an American professional basketball player. He played in the National Basketball League, Basketball Association of America, and American Basketball League during the early years of modern professional basketball in the United States. Following a standout high school career, Springer began his collegiate career at Indiana State Teacher's College, where he played one season for Glenn Curtis before completing his collegiate career at Canterbury College in Danville, Indiana.

At Canterbury, he was a member of the basketball team for three seasons, the football and track teams for two seasons. He was also a member of the Sigma Nu fraternity and the Letterman's Club. During his senior season, he averaged 20.8 points per game, second best in the Indiana Collegiate Conference behind John Wilson.

== BAA career statistics ==
Legend
GP	Games played
FG%	Field-goal percentage
FT%	Free-throw percentage
APG	Assists per game
PPG	Points per game

=== Regular season ===
Year	Team	GP	FG%	FT%	APG	PPG
1948–49	Indianapolis	2	.000	1.000	.0	.5
Career		2	.000	1.000	.0	.5
