= Isaac Walthour =

American basketball player

Isaac Walhour
Personal information
- Born: August 25, 1930 New York City, New York, U.S.
- Died: September 10, 1977 (aged 47)
- Listed height: 5 ft 11 in (1.80 m)
- Listed weight: 163 lb (74 kg)

Career information
- High school: Benjamin Franklin (New York City, New York)
- NBA draft: 1949: undrafted
- Position: Forward

Career history
- 1949–1951: New York/Saratoga Harlem Yankees
- 1953: Milwaukee Hawks
- Stats at NBA.com
- Stats at Basketball Reference

Isaac Walthour (August 25, 1930 – September 10, 1977) was an American professional basketball player. He played in the National Basketball Association for the Milwaukee Hawks for four games during the 1953–54 season.

He was a teammate of Zeke Sinicola at Benjamin Franklin High School in New York City.

== Career statistics ==
Legend
GP	Games played	GS	Games started	MPG	Minutes per game
FG%	Field goal percentage	3P%	3-point field goal percentage	FT%	Free throw percentage
RPG	Rebounds per game	APG	Assists per game	SPG	Steals per game
BPG	Blocks per game	PPG	Points per game	**Bold**	Career high

=== NBA ===
==== Regular season ====
Year	Team	GP	MPG	FG%	FT%	RPG	APG	PPG
1953–54	Milwaukee	4	7.5	.167	–	.3	.5	.5
