= Bob Knight (basketball, born 1929) =

American basketball player (1929–2008)

Personal information
- Born: April 30, 1929 Hartford, Connecticut, U.S.
- Died: May 23, 2008 (aged 79) Springfield, Massachusetts, U.S.
- Listed height: 6 ft 2 in (1.88 m)
- Listed weight: 185 lb (84 kg)

Career information
- High school: Weaver (Hartford, Connecticut)
- BAA draft: 1947: undrafted
- Playing career: 1947–1967
- Position: Guard / forward
- Number: 3

Career history
- 1947–1949: Hartford Hurricanes
- 1951: Bridgeport Roesslers
- 1951–1953: Manchester British-Americans
- 1954: New York Knicks
- 1961–1962: Scranton Miners
- 1965–1967: New Haven Elms

Career highlights
- ABL champion (1953)
- Stats at NBA.com
- Stats at Basketball Reference

Robert Fred Knight (April 30, 1929 – May 23, 2008) was an American professional basketball player. He did not play basketball at high school or college. Knight made his professional debut with the Hartford Hurricanes of the American Basketball League (ABL) in 1947 as the first African-American player signed by the club. He played in the ABL between 1947 and 1953, winning a league championship with the Manchester British-Americans in 1953.

On November 26, 1954, Knight signed with the New York Knicks of the National Basketball Association (NBA). He had left a strong impression on the team after he scored 30 points against them in an exhibition game in 1952. Knight played two games for the New York Knicks and averaged 3.5 points per game. On December 1, he was released by the Knicks. On February 16, 1955, he led Nassif Arms, a semi-pro team from Manchester, Connecticut, to a 91–71 victory over the NBA's Milwaukee Hawks. He was the game's leading scorer with 25 points and held All-Star Frank Selvy to eight points.

During the late 1940s and early 1950s, Knight played on-and-off for the Harlem Globetrotters. He played in the Eastern Professional Basketball League (EPBL) for the Scranton Miners during the 1961–62 season and the New Haven Elms from 1965 to 1967.

== Career statistics ==
Legend
GP	Games played	GS	Games started	MPG	Minutes per game
FG%	Field goal percentage	3P%	3-point field goal percentage	FT%	Free throw percentage
RPG	Rebounds per game	APG	Assists per game	SPG	Steals per game
BPG	Blocks per game	PPG	Points per game	**Bold**	Career high

=== NBA ===
==== Regular season ====
Year	Team	GP	MPG	FG%	FT%	RPG	APG	PPG
1954–55	New York	2	14.5	.429	1.000	.5	4.0	3.5
