= Skip Wise =

American basketball player (born 1955)

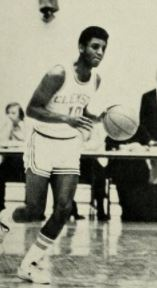
- Wise with the Clemson Tigers during the 1974–75 season

Personal information
- Born: July 25, 1955 (age 71)
- Listed height: 6 ft 2 in (1.88 m)
- Listed weight: 170 lb (77 kg)

Career information
- High school: Paul Laurence Dunbar (Baltimore, Maryland)
- College: Clemson (1974–1975)
- Position: Point guard
- Number: 10

Career history
- 1975: San Antonio Spurs

Career highlights
- First-team All-ACC (1975); First-team Parade All-American (1974)
- Stats at Basketball Reference

Allen Harper "Skip" Wise Jr. (born July 25, 1955) is an American former professional basketball player.

Wise was a sensation as a high school player at Dunbar High School in Baltimore, Maryland. In his junior year in 1973, Wise led Dunbar to a victory over DeMatha High School, led by future NBA star Adrian Dantley.

Wise then played at Clemson University and was the first freshman to win first team all-conference honors in the Atlantic Coast Conference.

Wise left Clemson after his freshman year, signing with the Baltimore Claws of the American Basketball Association in 1975. However, drugs impaired his play; in Terry Pluto's book on the ABA, Loose Balls, a coach found Wise shivering in the locker room, suggesting heroin use. The Claws folded after playing three preseason exhibition games (with the 20-year-old scoring 23 points in those contests, including twelve in Baltimore's last-ever game), so Wise then signed with the Golden State Warriors. The Warriors dropped him after a few days, however, with Wise's drug use as a major reason (allegedly, Warriors coach Al Attles caught Wise using heroin in the team locker room). In November, Wise hooked on with the San Antonio Spurs and appeared briefly in two games; they were his only regular season games as a professional, as the Spurs cut him by the end of the month.

Wise eventually served prison time for drug-related crimes in the 1970s and 1980s, before returning home to Baltimore and working in a local community center.
