= Jim Usry =

American basketball player and politician (1922–2002)

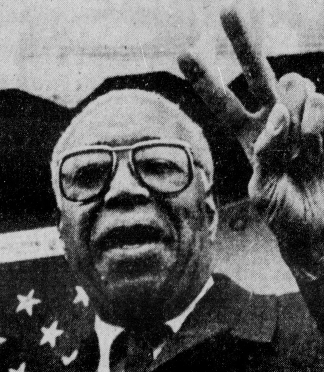

Personal information
- Born: February 22, 1922 Athens, Georgia, U.S.
- Died: January 25, 2002 (aged 79) Absecon, New Jersey, U.S.
- Listed height: 6 ft 4 in (1.93 m)
- Listed weight: 225 lb (102 kg)

Career information
- High school: Atlantic City (Atlantic City, New Jersey)
- College: Lincoln (PA) (1941–1942, 1945–1946)
- Position: Forward / center

Career history
- 1946–1948: New York Rens
- 1949: Dayton Rens
- 1949–1950: New York Rens
- 1949–1951: Saratoga Harlem Yankees

James Leroy Usry (February 2, 1922 – January 25, 2002) was the first African-American mayor of Atlantic City, New Jersey. He was also a professional basketball player.

== Biography ==
He was born on February 2, 1922, in Athens, Georgia. Usry graduated from Atlantic City High School and earned a bachelor's degree in 1946 from Lincoln University. From 1946 to 1951, he was a professional basketball player with the New York Renaissance and Dayton Rens. In 1971, he earned a master's degree from Glassboro State College.

A Republican, Usry served as mayor from 1984 to 1990, after defeating Mayor Michael J. Matthews in a recall election. From 1952 to 1984, Usry was an educator in the Atlantic City School District, where he served as assistant superintendent from 1977 to 1984.

On March 20, 1987, Usry was nominated by President Ronald Reagan for a two-year term on the National Advisory Council on Educational Research and Improvement.

On July 28, 1989, Usry was arrested with 13 other political leaders following an investigation into municipal corruption. He was charged with bribery, conspiracy, official misconduct and accepting unlawful gifts.

In 1990, Usry was succeeded as mayor by Jim Whelan. Supporters claimed the race had been rigged.

All major charges against Usry were dropped when he pleaded guilty to improper reporting of campaign contributions and agreed to perform 60 hours of community service with the Salvation Army.

He died on January 25, 2002, in Absecon, New Jersey.

== See also ==
- List of first African-American mayors

Preceded by Michael J. Matthews	Mayor of Atlantic City; 1984–1990	Succeeded by Jim Whelan
