= Baltimore Claws =

Short-lived American basketball team

The Baltimore Claws were an American basketball team which was supposed to appear in the 1975–76 season in the American Basketball Association (ABA). However, the team played only three exhibition games, all losses, before being expelled from the league due to financial difficulties.

== Background ==
The team that eventually became the Baltimore Claws was a charter member of the ABA, playing as the New Orleans Buccaneers from 1967 through 1970. They then moved to Memphis from 1970 to 1975, playing first as the Pros from 1970 to 1972, the Tams from 1972 to 1974, and the Sounds during the 1974–75 season. The Memphis franchise had struggled through the years and in its last season there it had relied on the league itself to handle some of its bills. The Sounds began the 1974–75 season with a win followed by several losses; fan interest waned but the team rallied to finish in fourth place in the ABA's Eastern Division. In the playoffs they lost in the Eastern Division semifinals to the eventual league champion Kentucky Colonels, 4 games to 1. Of the Sounds' draft picks that season, two of them (Lonnie Shelton and Terry Furlow) remained in college, while the third (Rich Kelley) signed with the New Orleans Jazz of the National Basketball Association (NBA) instead. At the close of the 1974–75 season, league commissioner Tedd Munchak issued an ultimatum to the Sounds that if they wanted to stay in Memphis: sell 4,000 season tickets, line up new investors for the team, and get a better lease at the Mid-South Coliseum. When none of the conditions were met, the league effectively took control of the franchise and put it on the open market.

== Relocation to Maryland ==
Prior to the 1975–76 season, a consortium of seven Maryland businessmen led by David Cohan bought the troubled Sounds for $1 million and relocated it to Baltimore. In August 1975, new ABA Commissioner Dave DeBusschere suddenly awarded the franchise to another group in Memphis due to apparent financial problems involving the Baltimore owners. However, the Memphis group in question backed out on buying the Sounds franchise the very next day, and the franchise reverted to Baltimore once again after the Cohan-led group made a $250,000 down payment.

The team was initially named the Baltimore Hustlers, but both league and public pressure forced them to rename it to the Claws instead.

== Personnel ==
In September the Claws gained attention early by gaining the rights to superstar Dan Issel of the reigning ABA champion Kentucky Colonels. The Colonels were supposed to receive center Tom Owens and $500,000 in cash for Issel, but the $500,000 never arrived. When Colonels owner John Y. Brown Jr. found out the money hadn't arrived, he stormed into a Claws' board meeting and announced he was selling Issel to the Denver Nuggets instead. To make the move look like a trade between Denver and Baltimore, the Nuggets sent forward Dave Robisch to the Claws. The Claws' owners protested, claiming that three more players should have come to Baltimore with Robisch. They threatened to shut down if the other players didn't arrive, claiming that they would not be able to field a competitive team without them. However, the league sided with Denver. The Claws then sent another good player, Rick Mount, to the Utah Stars in another trade.

The Claws entered the preseason under head coach Joe Mullaney with a roster that included Mel Daniels and Stew Johnson as key players. The Claws also suited up guard Skip Wise, who in the previous year was the first freshman to make the Atlantic Coast Conference All-Conference First Team after the NCAA changed its rules to allow for freshmen players to play college basketball. But Wise (a native of Baltimore) chose not to return to Clemson for his sophomore year, instead signing a five-year, $700,000 no-cut contract with the Claws.

== Intended Media Coverage ==
On September 7, 1975, the Claws announced a deal to broadcast all their games on radio on WFBR. Howard Mash, an announcer better known for commercials done for his father's low salt ham, was to be play-by-play man with Hall of Fame referee and coach Charley Eckman doing color commentary on home games. The deal died when the team did.

== Games ==
The Claws played only three games in their history, all preseason exhibitions. The first was on October 9, 1975, in the nearby city of Salisbury, Maryland, against the Virginia Squires. The Squires won their first match against the Claws 131–121; attendance was reported to be at 1,150 people.

Two days later the Claws lost to the NBA's Philadelphia 76ers 103–82 in Cherry Hill, New Jersey, in front of a capacity crowd of 1,213 at East High School.

On October 16, 1975, the Claws played the Squires again, this time at the Knott Arena in Mount St. Mary's College at Emmitsburg, Maryland. Virginia won once again, this time by a 100–88 final score, in front of approximately 500 spectators.

== Continuing problems ==
Due to mounting financial problems, the second loss to the Squires ended up being the Claws' final game. Cohan's group found it difficult to meet rudimentary team expenses. The players and coaches had not been paid, and the players were not even getting their per diem meal money. The players were still wearing old red Sounds uniforms with a green patch saying "Claws" over the old "Sounds" name, along with unaltered red Sounds warmups. Their practice T-shirts also had rips under the arms. Only 300 season tickets had been sold, below even the number of fans in their last preseason game.

On October 16, 1975, ABA Commissioner DeBusschere got word that one of the Claws' banks had yanked its line of credit. DeBusschere responded with an ultimatum to Cohan and his partners: unless they posted a $500,000 "performance bond" with the league within four days to cover expenses, the league would cancel the franchise. The Claws got together half of the money, but could not raise the rest. Reportedly, the remaining money plus an additional $70,000 was being held in escrow by the city, to be released only if Cohan resigned as team president.

The Claws asked the league for more time to get the needed money for the bond. However, the ABA refused and expelled the Claws on October 20, 1975, less than a week before the regular season began. The league issued a statement noting that it had been prepared to enter the 1975–76 season with "nine financially strong franchises." League officials added that the Claws' backers had been unable to get their affairs in order despite being given extra time to do so. The Claws' office at the Baltimore Civic Center was padlocked by arena management due to unpaid bills. (Incredibly, the Claws were just one of four different Baltimore "major league" franchises that vanished in 1975, the others being the Baltimore Banners of World Team Tennis, who folded in February; the Baltimore Blades of the World Hockey Association, who folded after their 1974–75 season concluded during their brief stay there; and finally the North American Soccer League's Baltimore Comets, who shifted to San Diego just a few days before the Claws officially folded.)

The Claws threatened to seek an injunction delaying the start of the season until Baltimore were reinstated, citing a provision in the rules requiring a ten days notice before any team could be shuttered. However, after both the ABA and the city threatened to file their own legal actions, the Claws quietly folded operations entirely. The league felt the ten-day rule was trumped by a larger obligation to ensure that its franchises were being run in a professional manner (and later, for the league's survival in its final season of existence).

== Dissolution ==
The Claws' players were put into a dispersal draft. Both Dave Robisch and Paul Ruffner ended up going to the Spirits of St. Louis. Stew Johnson was sent to the San Diego Sails (who also folded just a few weeks later, with the San Antonio Spurs acquiring Johnson in a different dispersal draft). Claude Terry was sent to the Denver Nuggets. Chuck Williams was sent to the Virginia Squires. Scott English was sent to the Indiana Pacers. Joe Hamilton was sent to the Utah Stars. George Carter also ended up with the Stars despite not being picked in the dispersal draft; Utah would become the ABA's third casualty of the season, suspending operations in early December. Only the Kentucky Colonels, New York Nets, and San Antonio Spurs declined to enter the dispersal draft for the defunct Claws franchise. The Claws' best known player, Mel Daniels, was disappointed at the Claws' fate and retired from play altogether rather than play for another team elsewhere. In Terry Pluto's book on the ABA, Loose Balls, Daniels recalled that the Claws' players were allowed to take equipment and furniture from the team's office in lieu of payment.

== Aftermath ==
The league's assertion that they still had "nine financially solid franchises" quickly proved to be incorrect, as both the San Diego Sails and the Utah Stars ceased operations before the 1975 calendar year was out. The wobbly Virginia Squires franchise did manage to finish the regular season, but with an awful 15–68 record played in front of small crowds. They too folded before the end of the 1976 ABA playoffs, leaving the ABA with only six remaining teams. Finally, the ABA would merge with the NBA during the summer of 1976. By that point in time, the Denver Nuggets, Indiana Pacers, New York Nets, and San Antonio Spurs would be the four teams from the ABA to survive and make it to the NBA, while the Kentucky Colonels and Spirits of St. Louis (the latter of whom initially planned to become the Utah Rockies had they survived) ended up folding during the merger talks.
