= Sonny Wood =

American basketball player

Personal information
- Born: December 31, 1922 New York, U.S.
- Died: July 11, 1970 (aged 47)
- Listed height: 5 ft 11 in (1.80 m)
- Listed weight: 195 lb (88 kg)

Career information
- High school: Benjamin Franklin (Harlem, New York)
- Position: Guard

Career history
- 1941–1942: New York Rens
- 1942–1943: Washington Bears
- 1943–1949: New York Rens
- 1949: Dayton Rens
- 1949–1951: New York / Saratoga Harlem Yankees
- 1952–1953: Hazelton-Saratoga

Robert "Sonny" Wood (December 31, 1922 – July 11, 1970) was an American professional basketball and minor league baseball player. He played in the National Basketball League for the Dayton Rens during the 1948–49 season and averaged 6.7 points per game. He also competed in independent leagues and the American Basketball League. Wood served in the Army in World War II.
