= Eddie Younger =

American basketball player

Personal information
- Born: January 7, 1923
- Died: March 18, 1985 (aged 62)
- Listed height: 5 ft 5 in (1.65 m)
- Listed weight: 140 lb (64 kg)

Career information
- High school: Franklin (Manhattan, New York)
- College: LIU Brooklyn (1942–1944)
- Playing career: 1944–1953
- Position: Guard

Career history
- 1944–1948: New York Rens
- 1945–1946: Harlem Globetrotters
- 1948–1950: Scranton Miners
- 1948–1949: Mohawk Redskins
- 1950–1951: Saratoga Harlem Yankees
- 1951–1952: Carbondale Aces
- 1952–1953: Glens Falls-Saratoga

Edward Younger (January 7, 1923 – March 18, 1985) was an American professional basketball player. He played for the New York Rens. Younger attended Benjamin Franklin High School and later Long Island University. Younger would also play for the Scranton Miners in the American Basketball League and was inducted into the New York City Basketball Hall of Fame in 2008.
