= Jerry Rizzo =

American basketball player

Personal information
- Born: March 12, 1918 Astoria, New York, U.S.
- Died: August 27, 2011 (aged 93) Las Vegas, Nevada, U.S.
- Listed height: 5 ft 7 in (1.70 m)
- Listed weight: 150 lb (68 kg)

Career information
- High school: Newtown (Queens, New York)
- College: Fordham (1939–1940)
- Playing career: 1940–1953
- Position: Guard
- Coaching career: 1950–1953

Career history

Playing
- 1940–1941: Cohoes Mastadons
- 1941–1942: Kingston
- 1945–1946: Paterson Crescents
- 1946–1949: Syracuse Nationals
- 1949: Saratoga Indians
- 1949: Schenectady Packers
- 1949–1952: Bridgeport Aer-A-Sols
- 1952–1953: Middletown Guards

Coaching
- 1950–1951: Bridgeport Aer-A-Sols
- 1952–1953: Middletown Guards

Jerome S. Rizzo (March 12, 1918 – August 27, 2011) was an American professional basketball player. He played for the Syracuse Nationals in the National Basketball League and averaged 8.4 points per game. On December 21, 1948, Jerry Rizzo was suspended for the remainder of the season, including the playoffs, after punching a referee during a 60–54 loss to the original Denver Nuggets, despite leading his team with 15 points. The incident was widely cited as potentially a factor in Rizzo not being called up by the Basketball Association of America (BAA).

After his professional basketball career ended, Rizzo moved to Las Vegas, Nevada and opened a sporting goods store.
