= Clarence Bell (basketball) =

American basketball player (1914–1985)

Personal information
- Born: November 26, 1914 New York, New York
- Died: February 19, 1985 (aged 70) New York, New York
- Listed height: 6 ft 2 in (1.88 m)
- Position: Forward

Career history

Playing
- 1939–1947: New York Rens
- 1942–1946: Washington Bears
- 1945–1946: Wilkes-Barre Barons
- 1947–1948: Saratoga Indians
- 1947–1949: Bridgeport Springwoods
- 1948–1949: Troy Celtics
- 1949–1951: Bristol Tramps
- 1950–1951: Manchester Nassiff Arms
- 1950–1952: Saratoga Harlem Yankees
- 1951–1953: Manchester British Americans

Coaching
- 1952–1953: Manchester British Americans

Career highlights
- 2× WPBT champion (1939, 1943); WPBT MVP (1939); First Team All-WPBT (1939); Second Team All-WPBT (1945)

Clarence Randolph ”Puggy” Bell (November 26, 1914 – February 19, 1985) was an American basketball player and coach. Bell never played in high school or college, instead he played in the YMCA league where he won several local and state championships. He later went on to play professionally, playing with the Passaic Crescents and the New York Harlem Yankees. Bell won the World Professional Basketball Tournament in 1939 with the New York Renaissance, when he was named the MVP, and in 1943 with the Washington Bears. In 2005, he was elected to the NYC Basketball Hall of Fame.
