= Hank DeZonie =

American basketball player (1922–2009)

Personal information
- Born: February 12, 1922 Harlem, New York, U.S.
- Died: January 2, 2009 (aged 86) Harlem, New York, U.S.
- Listed height: 6 ft 6 in (1.98 m)
- Listed weight: 215 lb (98 kg)

Career information
- College: Clark Atlanta (1941–1942)
- Position: Power forward / center
- Number: 10

Career history
- 1948–1949: Dayton Rens
- 1950–1951: Tri-Cities Blackhawks
- Stats at NBA.com
- Stats at Basketball Reference

Henry Lincoln DeZonie (February 12, 1922 – January 2, 2009) was an American professional basketball player. He was the fourth African-American player in the National Basketball Association (NBA), following Earl Lloyd, Nathaniel Clifton, and Chuck Cooper.

A 6'6" forward/center, DeZonie attended Clark Atlanta University in the 1940s and then joined the Dayton Rens, an all-black travelling basketball team named after the Harlem Renaissance. The Rens joined the integrated National Basketball League in 1948, and during the 1948–49 NBL season, DeZonie averaged 12.4 points per game in 18 games.

By August 1949, most of the teams in the NBL had been absorbed by the fledgling NBA. The Rens, however, were left out of the merger, and they were forced to disband as the NBA began its 1949–50 season as an all-white league. Black players did not enter the league until the start of the 1950–51 NBA season, when Lloyd, Clifton, and Cooper earned roster spots on the Rochester Royals, New York Knicks, and Boston Celtics, respectively. On December 3, 1950, DeZonie signed a contract with the Tri-Cities Blackhawks, becoming the fourth black player in the NBA.

DeZonie had the shortest career among the NBA's black pioneers, due mainly to racial discrimination and disagreements with his coach. After appearing in just five games for the Blackhawks, during which he averaged 3.4 points, DeZonie quit in frustration. "The coach didn't know basketball, and I couldn't bother with segregation. They put me up with an old woman who chewed tobacco and the snow was up to the ceiling. I was past that", he said. DeZonie's fellow black players experienced frustrations, as well, but each of them remained in the league for at least six seasons.

Because of his relatively short career, DeZonie's contributions were long forgotten by many basketball fans; recently, however, DeZonie has received more recognition. In 2000, for example, the NBA honored DeZonie as one of its black pioneers at a pregame ceremony at Madison Square Garden. Basketball historian Ron Thomas also highlighted DeZonie's accomplishments in his 2004 book They Cleared the Lane (ISBN 0-8032-9454-9). DeZonie died on January 2, 2009, at the age of 86. In the later years of his life, he experienced emphysema and asthma.

DeZonie spent his adult years as an entrepreneur. He and his late wife Rose DeZonie were staples in the Harlem community where they owned/operated the Renny Lounge up until it closed in 1990. The Renny Lounge was located on 138th Street and 7th Ave. Which was located under the renowned Renaissance Ballroom.

== Career statistics ==
Legend
GP	Games played	GS	Games started	MPG	Minutes per game
FG%	Field goal percentage	3P%	3-point field goal percentage	FT%	Free throw percentage
RPG	Rebounds per game	APG	Assists per game	SPG	Steals per game
BPG	Blocks per game	PPG	Points per game	**Bold**	Career high

=== NBA ===
==== Regular season ====
Year	Team	GP	FG%	FT%	RPG	APG	PPG
1950–51	Tri-Cities	5	.240	.714	3.6	1.8	3.4

== See also ==
- Race and ethnicity in the NBA
