= Manchester British-Americans =

American basketball team

The Manchester British-Americans were an American basketball team based in Manchester, Connecticut that was a member of the American Basketball League (ABL). Boxer Ruby Goldstein once played for the team. He is one of the oldest people to have ever played in the ABL at 43 years 9 months and two days. By contrast, one of their youngest players was Ray Felix, a player who would get drafted as the #1 pick in the 1953 NBA draft. The team played their home games at Manchester Armory.

== Year-by-year ==
Year	League	Reg. season	Playoffs
1951/52	ABL	5th	Did not qualify
1952/53	ABL	1st	Champions

== Legacy ==
Their name is not used anymore, however, a name like this helped spread the name of basketball to the UK where the Manchester Giants competed in the BBL (British Basketball League).
