= Bridgeport Roesslers =

Basketball team

The Bridgeport Newfield Steelers were an American basketball team based in Bridgeport, Connecticut that was a member of the American Basketball League. Before the 1949–50 season, the team became the Bridgeport Aer-A-Sols and for their final season was renamed the Bridgeport Roesslers. The Bridgeport Newfield Steelers also previously played in the final World Professional Basketball Tournament ever held, albeit as one of only two independent teams that season alongside the famous New York Renaissance (who had previously won the inaugural WPBT event) that were forced to compete against each other in the first round when the rest of that year's final tournament was held by National Basketball League teams alongside the Wilkes-Barre Barons of the ABL, which Bridgeport would join following the conclusion of this tournament.

On 27 December 1949, George Kok scored 23 points against Scranton Miners, which was not enough to prevent a 90–83 loss to the league leaders, who went on to win the 1949–50 American Basketball League, while Aer-A-Sols finished second.

== Year-by-year ==
Year	League	Reg. season	Playoffs
1948/49	ABL	4th	Did not qualify
1949/50	ABL	2nd	Finals
1950/51	ABL	4th	No playoff
1951/52	ABL	6th	Did not qualify
