= Elmira Colonels =

American basketball team based in Elmira, New York

The Elmira Colonels (also known as the Rosies) were an American basketball team based in Elmira, New York that was a member of the American Basketball League. It is, to date, the only major league sports team to have ever resided in the Southern Tier of the state of New York.

== Year-by-year ==
Year	League	Reg. season	Playoffs
1951/52	ABL	2nd	Did not qualify
1952/53	ABL	3rd	Playoffs
