= Saratoga Harlem Yankees =

The Saratoga Harlem Yankees, also known as the New York Harlem Yankees, the Schenectady Yankees, the Glen Falls-Saratoga Harlem Yankees, and the Hazleton Harlem Yankees were an American professional basketball team based in several New York State locations. It was a member of the American Basketball League.

In the 1949/1950 season, the team played as the New York Harlem Yankees in New York City. They became the Saratoga Yankees in Saratoga Springs, New York, for the 1950/1951 season and the 1951/1952 season. During the 1951/52 season, the Saratoga Yankees moved to Schenectady, New York, but returned to Saratoga to reclaim the Harlem Yankees name before the end of the season. Finally, during the 1952/1953 season, the team played as the Hazleton Harlem Yankees before ending their final season of play as the Glen Falls-Saratoga Harlem Yankees.

The Yankees basketball team folded during the 1952/1953 season.

== Year-by-year ==
Year	Team	League	Reg. season	Playoffs
1949/50	New York Harlem Yankees; Saratoga Harlem Yankees	ABL	4th	Playoffs
1950/51	Saratoga Harlem Yankees	ABL	6th	Did not qualify
1951/52	Saratoga Harlem Yankees; Schenectady Yankees	ABL	4th	Did not qualify
1952/53	Hazleton Harlem Yankees; Glen Falls-Saratoga Harlem Yankees	ABL	7th	Did not qualify
