= 1947–48 Lancaster Red Roses season =

American Basketball League season

1947–48 Lancaster (Red) Roses season
- League: American Basketball League (revived original)
- Head coach: Woody Sponaugle
- General manager: Woody Sponaugle(?)
- Owner(s): Woody Sponaugle(?)
- Arena: Lancaster Armory

Results
- Record: 1–5 (.167)
- Place: Conference: N/A (Unofficially 8th)
- Playoff finish: Did not qualify. (The Lancaster Red Roses withdrew operations from the ABL to compete in the newly-rivaling Eastern Pennsylvania Basketball League on December 4, 1947.)

1947–48 Lancaster Red Roses season
- League: Eastern Pennsylvania Basketball League
- Head coach: Woody Sponaugle
- General manager: Woody Sponaugle(?)
- Owner(s): Woody Sponaugle(?)
- Arena: Lancaster Armory

Results
- Record: 14–14 (.500)
- Place: Conference: 4th
- Playoff finish: Lost EPBL Semifinals 2–1 to the Reading Keys.

The 1947–48 Lancaster (Red) Roses season was officially the second season of existence for the Lancaster Red Roses basketball team that was originally competing in the Eastern Pennsylvania Basketball League, as well as their first and only season of play for the team when they competed in what would be considered as the revived version of the American Basketball League. Originally, Lancaster would join the inaugural EPBL champions in the Wilkes-Barre Barons to defect from the more minor EPBL to the (still) major-looking ABL in order to have eight teams compete in a single division (or conference) instead of having two divisions occur like the ABL had utilized for its previous season. However, after the (Red) Roses had a poor start to their only season of play out in the ABL, winning only once out of six games played for a 1–5 record, they ended up leaving the ABL on December 3, 1947, to reenter the Eastern Professional Basketball League not long afterward, with the EPBL modifying their schedule for the rest of the season to have every team play 28 total games since they originally had seven teams start out that particular league's season at the time. Not only that, but due to the weird way the team was referred to as either the Lancaster Red Roses or just the Lancaster Roses throughout media publications this season, it can also explain why the Red part of the team's Red Roses name might not show up in the team's name whenever they're mentioned during this season specifically due to their split time between the major ABL and the minor EPBL. Despite them returning to a league that fit their pace a lot more by comparison to what the ABL held for them (which included another former ABL team in the recently revived Harrisburg Senators), the EPBL would end up getting a bit stronger this season when compared to the previous season of play, which led to the Red Roses getting an average 14–14 record there, which would barely be good enough to qualify for the EPBL's Playoffs this season due to them still being better than the Philadelphia Lumberjacks, Williamsport Billies, Harrisburg Senators, and Sunbury Mercuries (albeit barely in the last team's case), but behind the Hazleton Mountaineers and the first place tie between the Reading Keys and the Pottsville Packers. After determining who would get first place this season (which went to Pottsville this time around), Lancaster would go up against the Reading Keys in the semifinal round; unfortunately for the Red Roses, the Keys would come back to win the series 2–1 after Lancaster won the first game in the series (with the Keys later winning the second championship in the EPBL's history over the #3 seeded Hazleton Mountaineers 2–1 themselves), thus eliminating the Red Roses from their shot at redemption in the EPBL's championship series for this season.

== Roster ==
Due to information on players from both the American Basketball League and the Eastern Pennsylvania Basketball League being generally hard to find (especially by the time the ABL was designated more as a minor league during its later years of existence, never mind the EPBL operating under its early years as a minor basketball league of sorts on their own accord as well), there are bound to be more gaps and/or inaccuracies found in certain areas on the team's roster spots than usual.

1947–48 Lancaster (Red) Roses roster
Players

Pos.	No.	Player	Height	Weight	DOB	From
G		Tommy Bell			1922-09-11	La Salle
G/F		Bob Boylan	6 ft 2 in (1.88 m)	185 lb (84 kg)	1920-04-11	Saint Joseph's
		Johnny Burger			1922-11-18	No college
		Norm Butz			1919-09-28	Saint Joseph's
		Jim DiGiacomo			1928-12-19	No college
F		George Ehemann	6 ft 4 in (1.93 m)		1918-09-11	Millersville State
		Walt Funk			1922-10-13	Penn State
G/F		Don Gleasner	6 ft 3 in (1.91 m)	198 lb (90 kg)	1922-12-30	Maryland
F/C		Steve Juenger	6 ft 3 in (1.91 m)	195 lb (88 kg)	1915-02-10	Temple
		Bud Long			1924-02-10	No college
G		Bink Manning	6 ft 0 in (1.83 m)		1920-08-29	Brown Prep (PA)
		Don Markward			1919-04-02	No college
G		Jack McCloskey	6 ft 2 in (1.88 m)	190 lb (86 kg)	1925-09-19	Penn
		Ken McKee			1926-06-07	No college
F		John Murphy	6 ft 2 in (1.88 m)	175 lb (79 kg)	1924-09-13	Simon Gratz HS (PA)
F		Tommy O'Connell	6 ft 2 in (1.88 m)	200 lb (91 kg)	1923-11-10	Albright College
F		Fred Sheffield	6 ft 2 in (1.88 m)	165 lb (75 kg)	1923-11-05	Utah
G		Stan Waxman	5 ft 11 in (1.80 m)	180 lb (82 kg)	1922-05-20	Long Island
		Pete Yousaitis			1917-09-10	Reading Senior HS (PA)
G/F		Bill Zubic	6 ft 5 in (1.96 m)	205 lb (93 kg)	1918-08-07	Southeast Catholic HS (PA)

Coaches
Head coach

Woody Sponaugle

Legend
- (DP) Unsigned draft pick
- (FA) Free agent
- (S) Suspended
- Injured

Note: Tommy Bell, Norm Butz, Walt Funk, Don Markward, Jack McCloskey, John Murphy, Tommy O'Connell, Fred Sheffield, Stan Waxman, Pete Yousaitis, and Bill Zubic would play for Lancaster while they were in both the American Basketball League and the Eastern Pennsylvania Basketball League, with Don Gleasner and Bill Manning only being on the team's roster while they were in the ABL, while everyone else on the team (including former leading ABL scorer Steve Juenger) was on their EPBL roster specifically.

== Team Standings ==
=== American Basketball League Standings ===
Due to the decreased number of teams this season, the ABL would remove divisions from their league this season going forward after previously using them for their previous season of play.

Pos.	Team	Wins	Losses	Win %
1	Wilkes-Barre Barons	26	8	.765
2	Paterson Crescents	19	16	.543
3	Trenton Tigers	17	15	.531
4	Jersey City Atoms / Scranton Miners^{[a]}	16	16	.500
5	Elizabeth Braves / Hartford Hurricanes^{[b]}	11	12	.478
6	Philadelphia SPHAs	13	19	.406
7	Brooklyn Gothams	8	20	.286
8	Lancaster (Red) Roses†^{[c]}	1	5	.167

† – Withdrew from the ABL.

=== Eastern Pennsylvania Basketball League Standings ===
Pos.	Team	W	L	PCT	GB
1	Pottsville Packers	19	9	.679	—
2	Reading Keys	19	9	.679	—
3	Hazleton Mountaineers	18	10	..643	1
4	Lancaster Red Roses	14	14	.500	5
5	Sunbury Mercuries	13	15	.464	6
6	Harrisburg Senators	11	16	.407	7.5
7	Williamsport Billies	9	18	.333	9.5
8	Philadelphia Lumberjacks	8	20	.286	11

== Eastern Pennsylvania Basketball League Playoffs ==
Following the first place tiebreaker playoff match between Pottsville and Reading (which saw Pottsville win 60–57), the EPBL would begin their playoffs properly with Lancaster competing against Reading instead of Pottsville.

=== Eastern Pennsylvania Basketball League Semifinals ===
(4) Lancaster Red Roses Vs. (2) Reading Keys: Reading wins series 2–1

- Game 1: The Lancaster Red Roses defeated the Reading Keys 83–73.
- Game 2: The Reading Keys defeated the Lancaster Red Roses 57–64.
- Game 3: The Reading Keys defeated the Lancaster Red Roses 65–71.

== Notes ==
^{a} Originally, the Jersey City Atoms would move from Jersey City, New Jersey to nearby Union City, New Jersey on January 16, 1948 (though it doesn't appear that the Jersey City Atoms rebranded their team by this point in time) before moving again to Scranton, Pennsylvania to become the Scranton Miners twelve days later on January 28, 1948, for the rest of the season going forward.
^{b} The Elizabeth Braves would move from Elizabeth, New Jersey to Hartford, Connecticut on December 19, 1947, to become the Hartford Hurricanes for the rest of the season.
^{c} The Lancaster Roses (sometimes referred to as the Lancaster Red Roses instead) would end up withdrawing their operations from the ABL early in the season on December 4, 1947, to return to the Eastern Professional Basketball League not long afterward.
