= List of basketball players who died during their careers =

This is a list of all notable basketball players who died while on a team roster, as a free agent, or while not rostered but still seeking work, playing for a national team, or otherwise not retired. Many of them died in accidents such as car or plane crashes. Some suffered sudden cardiac death, which has a higher incidence in basketball among young athletes. Some suffered from the heart condition hypertrophic cardiomyopathy, which is more common in African Americans. Basketball has a considerably higher ratio of African-Americans than other sports. Other deaths were caused by drug abuse.

Included are NBA players, WNBA players, college players, and players in other notable leagues who died before their retirement from basketball. Players who died following the conclusion of their career should not be included. Players are listed with the team for which they last played before death, rather than the team with which the player spent most of their playing career.

Basketball teams may honor active players who died by bestowing upon them a posthumous honor of a retired number.

== Deaths of active players with individually notable careers ==
=== Africa ===
Name	Age	Position	Team	League	Cause of death	Death	Ref.
Abraham Sie	22 years, 218 days	Point guard	DUC	Nationale 1	unknown	6 April 2022	

=== Asia ===
Name	Age	Position	Team	League	Cause of death	Death	Ref.
Nilay Aydoğan	30 years, 282 days	Forward	Çankaya Üniversitesi	Women's Basketball Super League	earthquake	12 February 2023	
Gilbert Bulawan	29 years, 313 days	Power forward / center	Blackwater Elite	PBA	heart enlargement (collapsed during practice)	3 July 2016	
Kenny Ejim	27 years, 73 days	Power forward	Al-Najma	Bahraini Premier League	unknown	14 February 2022	
Jimly Lantaya	24 years, 286 days	Center / Forward	GenSan Warriors	MPBL	Complications of thoracic aortic aneurysm	2 August 2025	
Marvin Stone	26 years, 304 days	Center	Al-Ittihad	SPL	heart attack (collapsed during halftime)	1 April 2008	

=== Australia and Oceania ===
Name	Age	Position	Team	League	Cause of death	Death	Ref.
Scott Fenton	24 years, 289 days	Shooting guard	Perth Wildcats	NBL	car crash	21 August 1989	
Tiana Mangakahia	30 years, 143 days	Guard	Southern Districts Spartans	NBL1 North	breast cancer	11 September 2025	

=== Europe ===
Name	Age	Position	Team	League	Cause of death	Death	Ref.
Davide Ancilotto	23 years, 233 days	Shooting guard	Virtus Roma	Lega Basket Serie A	brain ischemia	24 August 1997	
Richard Batum	30–31	Forward	Autun Basket	Ligue Bourgogne-Franche-Comté de Basketball	aneurysm on court	1 September 1991	
Alexander Belov	26 years, 328 days	Center	Spartak Leningrad	USSR Premier Basketball League	cancer	3 October 1978	
Haris Brkić	26 years, 144 days	Small forward	Partizan	YUBA	homicide by gunshot	15 December 2000	
Mack Coleman	24 years, 329 days	Forward	Calais	France	coronary occlusion	12 June 1977	
Srebrenko Despot	25 years, 307 days	Center	KK Cibona	First Federal Basketball League	car crash	12 May 1983	
Robert Elmore	23 years, 34 days	Center	Lazio	Serie A2	circulatory failure (drug induced)	26 November 1977	
Lavelle Felton	29 years, 312 days	Shooting guard	Paderborn Baskets	ProA	homicide by gunshot	13 August 2009	
Tyler Honeycutt	27 years, 357 days	Small forward	BC Khimki	EuroLeague	suicide by gunshot	7 July 2018	
Zoltán Horváth	30 years, 92 days	Power forward / center	Falco Szombathely	Nemzeti Bajnokság I/A	car crash (on his way to practice)	28 December 2009	
Stevan Jelovac	32 years, 150 days	Power forward / center	AEK Athens	Greek Basket League	stroke (collapsed during practice)	5 December 2021	
Radivoj Korać	30 years, 209 days	Power forward	Petrarca Padova	Serie A	car crash	2 June 1969	
Dennis Kramer	31 years, 229 days	Power forward	ASC 1846 Göttingen	Regionalliga	car crash	27 August 2023	
Rasmus Larsen	20 years, 169 days	Power forward/Center	Spirou Charleroi	Ethius League	cardiac arrest (died in sleep)	13 May 2015	
Fessor Leonard	24 years, 246 days	Center	Federale Lugano	Swiss Basketball League	carbon monoxide poisoning	20 February 1978	
Jovan Manović	29 years, 361 days	Point guard	AS Prishtina	KBS	homicide by gunshot	9 May 2007	
Fernando Martín Espina	27 years, 253 days	Power forward / center	Real Madrid Baloncesto	Liga ACB	car crash	3 December 1989	
Steve Mitchell	27 years, 232 days	Forward	Sarila Rimini	Serie A	heart failure	5 December 1978	
Michael Ojo	27 years, 215 days	Center	Crvena zvezda	ABA	heart attack (collapsed during practice)	7 August 2020	
Ruslan Otverchenko	33 years, 9 days	Shooting guard	Budivelnyk	European North Basketball League	heart complications	15 January 2023	
Adreian Payne	31 years, 79 days	Center / power forward	Juventus Utena	LKL	homicide by gunshot	9 May 2022	
Mark Petteway	27 years, 354 days	Small forward / power forward	Apollon Patras	Greek Basket League	suicide by gunshot	1 June 1989	
Slobodan Popović	24	Forward	Crvena zvezda	Yugoslav League	groin injury complication	31 December 1968	
Trajko Rajković	32 years, 171 days	Center	OKK Beograd	KLS	heart defect (died in his sleep four days after winning the FIBA World Championship)	27 May 1970	
Tauras Stumbrys	34 years, 282 days	Point guard	Atletas Kaunas	LKL	heart attack (collapsed during game)	16 October 2004	
Örlygur Aron Sturluson	18 years, 240 days	Point guard	Njarðvík	Úrvalsdeild karla	accidental fall	16 January 2000	
Jānis Timma	32 years, 168 days	Small forward / Shooting guard	Monbus Obradoiro	Liga ACB	suicide	17 December 2024	
Alexandros Varitimiadis	28 years, 320 days	Power forward	Raiffeisen Dornbirn Lions	Basketball Zweite Liga	cancer	7 May 2023	
Ludovic Vaty	34 years, 284 days	Power forward / center	TOAC Basket	Nationale masculine 2	heart attack	1 September 2023	
Luciano Vendemini	24 years, 224 days	Center	ChinaMartini Torino	Lega Basket Serie A	heart failure (undiagnosed Marfan's syndrome)	20 February 1977	
Heino Veskila	22 years, 251 days	Forward	Tartu Dünamo	Estonia	executed by German occupation forces during World War II	22 August 1941	
Michael Wright	35 years, 307 days	Power forward	Cholet	LNB Pro A	homicide	10 November 2015	
Olga Yakovleva	24 years, 54 days	Center	Vologda-Chevakata	Russian Superleague 1	drowning	8 August 2010	

=== South America and American islands ===
Name	Age	Position	Team	League	Cause of death	Death	Ref.
Fab Melo	26 years, 236 days	Center	Brasília	NBB	heart attack (died in sleep)	11 February 2017	
Robert Traylor	34 years, 99 days	Power forward / center	Vaqueros de Bayamón	BSN	heart attack	11 May 2011	

=== North America ===
==== NBA and other major leagues ====
Name	Age	Position	Team	League	Cause of death	Death	Ref.
Ricky Berry	24 years, 312 days	Small forward	Sacramento Kings	NBA	suicide by gunshot	14 August 1989	
Len Bias	22 years, 213 days	Small forward	Boston Celtics	NBA	heart attack (drug induced)	19 June 1986	
Brandon Clarke	29 years, 234 days	Power forward	Memphis Grizzlies	NBA	accident of drug mixture via speedball	11 May 2026	
Jason Collier	28 years, 37 days	Center	Atlanta Hawks	NBA	heart enlargement	15 October 2005	
Bryce Dejean-Jones	23 years, 281 days	Shooting guard	New Orleans Pelicans	NBA	gunshot	28 May 2016	
Terry Furlow	25 years, 218 days	Small forward / shooting guard	Utah Jazz	NBA	car crash	23 May 1980	
Eddie Griffin	25 years, 79 days	Power forward / center	Free agent (Note: Waived by the Minnesota Timberwolves on March 13, 2007.)	NBA	car crash	17 August 2007	
Huck Hartman	25 years, 153 days	Center	Youngstown Bears	NBL	pneumonia	25 March 1946	
Connie Kunzmann	24 years, 219 days	Forward	Nebraska Wranglers	WPBL	homicide by stabbing	7 February 1981	
Wendell Ladner	26 years, 261 days	Forward	New York Nets	ABA	plane crash	24 June 1975	
Reggie Lewis	27 years, 248 days	Small forward	Boston Celtics	NBA	cardiac arrest secondary to hypertrophic cardiomyopathy (collapsed during practice)	27 July 1993	
Conrad McRae	29 years, 181 days	Power forward / center	Orlando Magic	NBA	heart enlargement (collapsed during practice)	10 July 2000	
Kim Perrot	32 years, 213 days	Point guard	Houston Comets	WNBA	lung cancer	19 August 1999	
Dražen Petrović	28 years, 228 days	Shooting guard	New Jersey Nets	NBA	car crash	7 June 1993	
Bobby Phills	30 years, 23 days	Shooting guard	Charlotte Hornets	NBA	car crash	12 January 2000	
Chad Posthumus	33 years, 282 days	Centre	Winnipeg Sea Bears	CEBL	complications from corrective surgery following a brain aneurysm	20 November 2024	
Katrina Price	23 years, 46 days	Shooting guard	Philadelphia Rage	ABL	suicide by gunshot	18 January 1999	
Ernie Reich	29 years, 91 days	Shooting guard / Small forward	Original Celtics	EBL	pneumonia	23 February 1922	
Bill Robinzine	29 years, 239 days	Power forward	Utah Jazz	NBA	suicide by carbon monoxide poisoning	16 September 1982	
Malik Sealy	30 years, 109 days	Small forward / shooting guard	Minnesota Timberwolves	NBA	car crash	20 May 2000	
Dwight Smith	21 years, 260 days	Guard	Los Angeles Lakers	NBA	car crash	14 May 1967	
Nick Vanos	24 years, 125 days	Center	Phoenix Suns	NBA	plane crash	16 August 1987	

==== Minor leagues ====
Name	Age	Position	Team	League	Cause of death	Death	Ref.
Tommy Bell	27 years, 97 days	Point guard / Shooting guard	Pottsville Packers	EPBL	gastrointestinal bleeding	17 December 1949	
Troy Jackson	38 years, 40 days	Power forward / center	AND1	AND1 Mixtape Tour	hypertensive heart disease	20 February 2011	
Chuck Karmarkovich	23 years, 300 days	Forward / center	Johnstown Clippers	AABL	car crash	11 January 1951	
John Postley	30 years, 62 days	Forward / center	Wilkes-Barre Barons	EPBL	heart attack	31 July 1970	
Bob Presley	28 years, 329 days	Center	Martinez Muirs	WBA	suicide by drowning	25 March 1975	
Zeke Upshaw	26 years, 303 days	Small forward	Grand Rapids Drive	NBA G League	cardiac arrest (collapsed during game)	26 March 2018	

==== College ====
Name	Age	Position	Team	League	Cause of death	Death	Ref.
Terrence Clarke	19 years, 228 days	Shooting guard	Kentucky Wildcats	NCAA	car crash	22 April 2021	
Patrick Dennehy	21 years, 135 days	Center	Baylor Bears	NCAA	homicide by gunshot	12 June 2003	
Wayne Estes	21 years, 271 days	Forward	Utah State Aggies	NCAA	accidental electrocution	8 February 1965	
Ryan Francis	19 years, 57 days	Point guard	USC Trojans	NCAA	homicide by gunshot	13 May 2006	
Oscar Frayer	23 years, 67 days	Forward	Grand Canyon Antelopes	NCAA	car crash	23 March 2021	
Hank Gathers	23 years, 21 days	Forward	Loyola Marymount Lions	NCAA	heart condition (collapsed during game)	4 March 1990	
Gregg Glenn III	22 years, 102 days	Forward	Tulane Green Wave	NCAA	car crash	27 July 2025	
Lauren Hill	19 years, 191 days	Forward	Mount St. Joseph Lions	NCAA	brain cancer	10 April 2015	
Shawntinice Polk	22 years, 183 days	Center	University of Arizona	NCAA	pulmonary embolism	26 September 2005	
Leonard Poole	18 years, 327 days	Guard	Murray State Racers	NCAA	drowning	27 July 1965	
Danny Rumph	21 years, 297 days	Point guard	Western Kentucky	NCAA	Cardiac arrest due to hypertrophic cardiomyopathy	8 May 2005	
Chris Street	20 years, 352 days	Power forward	Iowa Hawkeyes	NCAA	car crash	19 January 1993	

===== Evansville Purple Aces plane crash =====
Fourteen members of the 1977–78 Evansville Purple Aces men's basketball team died in a plane crash on December 13, 1977, along with fifteen others including head coach Bobby Watson. The players killed were:

- Seniors: Kevin Kingston, John Ed Washington, and Marion Anthony “Tony” Windburn
- Juniors: Stephen Miller and Bryan Taylor
- Sophomores: Keith Moon
- Freshmen: Warren Alston, Ray Comandella, Mike Duff, Kraig Heckendorn, Michael Joyner, Barney Lewis, Greg Smith, and Mark Siegel

Freshman David Furr, the lone player who did not board Air Indiana Flight 216, died two weeks later in a car crash, meaning that all Purple Ace basketball players died during the 1977–78 season.

==== High school ====
Name	Age	Position	Team	League	Cause of death	Birth	Death	Ref.
Ben Wilson	17 years, 248 days	Guard / forward	Simeon Career Academy	IHSA	homicide	21 November 1984		
Wes Leonard	16 years, 185 days	Guard / forward	Fennville High School	AAU	cardiac arrest seconds after making the game-winning shot	3 March 2011		

== See also ==
- Sudden cardiac death of athletes
- Kobe Bryant, 41, died in a helicopter crash alongside his 13-year-old daughter Gianna and seven other individuals.
- Bison Dele, 33, is believed to have been murdered at sea by his brother.
- Alphonso Ford, 32, died of leukemia one week after retiring.
- Florian Louart, 22, died of a heart attack one year after his retirement.
- Pete Maravich, 40, died while playing a basketball pick-up game several years after his retirement.
- Elijah Olaniyi, 26, who medically retired due to brain cancer, from which he later died.
- Caleb Swanigan, 25, died of natural causes two years after his final NBA game.
- Lorenzen Wright, 34, who was not rostered when he was murdered by his ex-wife.
