= Tommy Bell (basketball) =

American basketball player (1922-1949)

Personal information
- Born: September 11, 1922 Philadelphia, Pennsylvania, U.S.
- Died: December 17, 1949 (aged 27) Philadelphia, Pennsylvania, U.S.

Career information
- High school: Northeast Catholic (Philadelphia, Pennsylvania)
- College: La Salle
- Playing career: 1946–1949

Career history

Playing
- 1946–1947: Allentown Rockets
- 1947: Lancaster Red Roses
- 1947–1948: Hazleton Mountaineers
- 1948–1949: Pottsville Packers

Coaching
- 1949: Pottsville Packers

Career highlights
- EPBL champion (1949)

Thomas Joseph Bell (September 11, 1922 – December 17, 1949) was an American professional basketball player. He played in the Eastern Professional Basketball League (EPBL) for three seasons with the Allentown Rockets, Lancaster Red Roses, Hazleton Mountaineers and Pottsville Packers. Bell was the player-coach of the Packers in 1949 when he suffered intestinal haemorrhages which were believed to be caused by a blow he received during a game. He never recovered from his illness and died ten months later.

== Playing career ==
Bell attended Northeast Catholic High School in Philadelphia, Pennsylvania, and played college basketball for the La Salle Explorers. He started his professional career with the Allentown Rockets of the Eastern Professional Basketball League (EPBL) during its inaugural season in 1946. On January 19, 1947, Bell's contract was purchased by the Lancaster Red Roses but he was permitted to play one final game with the Rockets in a 51–64 loss to the Red Roses the following night. He started the 1947–48 season with the Red Roses but was traded to the Hazleton Mountaineers after six games. The Mountaineers were disbanded at the end of the season and Bell signed with the Pottsville Packers. On January 27, 1949, Bell was appointed as player-coach of the Packers after a losing streak. He led the Packers to a 5–5 record during his tenure.

Bell played in 83 EPBL games and totalled 688 points.

== Illness and death ==
On March 8, Bell fell ill while at work as a crane operator and was admitted to hospital where it was discovered that he was suffering from intestinal haemorrhages. Hospital authorities believed that Bell's condition may have been caused by a blow he received while playing against the Reading Keys three days earlier. On March 17, the EPBL hosted a special benefit game between the Packers and a team composed of the Eastern League All-Stars to raise funds for Bell; it collected over $1,300 which primarily went to Bell's hospital expenses. The Packers went on to win the 1949 EPBL championship.

Bell remained in the Naval Hospital Philadelphia until his release in July 1949. He returned to work but was readmitted to the Naval Hospital in September when his legs became paralyzed. By the start of December, Bell was still seriously ill but was able to return to his home from the hospital each weekend.

Bell died in his Philadelphia home on December 17, 1949, after ten months of illness. He was survived by his wife, Regina R. Bell. The Packers held a minute of silence in Bell's memory prior to their game against the Harrisburg Senators that same night.

== Legacy ==
On December 27, 1949, William Morgan, the president of the EPBL, announced that the league was introducing a most valuable player award with the winner to be given the Tommy Bell Trophy. Morgan said, "Tommy Bell was every inch a valuable player." Bill Zubic of the Lancaster Rockets was the inaugural winner and had his trophy presented by Bell's widow.

== See also ==
- List of basketball players who died during their careers
