= 1948–49 Philadelphia Sphas season =

American basketball team season

1948–49 Atlantic City Tides / Philadelphia Sphas season
- League: American Basketball League (revived original)
- Head coach: Harry Litwack
- General manager: Al Sofer (Atlantic City Tides); Eddie Gottlieb; Harry Litwack; Jerry Rullo (Philadelphia Sphas)
- Owner(s): Eddie Gottlieb; Abe Radel
- Arena: Million Dollar Pier (Atlantic City Tides); Broadwood Hotel (Philadelphia Sphas)

Results
- Record: 8–26 (.235)
- Place: Conference: 8th
- Playoff finish: Did not qualify

The Philadelphia Sphas were an early, historical example of an American professional basketball team. The 1948–49 season was the sixteenth and final season played by the Philadelphia Sphas in the now-revived American Basketball League, although they did play in the original rendition of the ABL from 1926 to 1928 as the Philadelphia Warriors, which had no relation to the later BAA franchise of the same name that now exists in the present day as the Golden State Warriors in the NBA. As such, when including the past history of the original ABL with the revived version of the ABL in 1933 following historical problems that related to the Great Depression near the end of 1931, this would technically be the 22nd official season played by the original ABL properly, though this would officially be the 32nd and final season of play for the Sphas franchise when including previous seasons where they played under names like the "Philadelphia YMHA"; the "Philadelphia Passon, Gottlieb, Black", the "Philadelphia Warriors"; the "Philadelphia Hebrews", and most recently, the "Atlantic City Tides". Depending on certain outlets in mind, this season can also be seen as either the second or third season in the ABL's revived history where it would be seen as more of a minor basketball league in terms of scope when compared to both the rivaling National Basketball League and the newer Basketball Association of America (which later would both merge into the present-day National Basketball Association). Following this season's conclusion, the Sphas would reject the intention of moving out to Utica, New York (due to Utica only wanting the basketball franchise and not the historic Sphas team name) following a failed attempt to continue playing as an ABL team for the 1949–50 season (with some home games being played in Wilmington, Delaware to make up for some lackluster home games from this season and not having enough home scheduled games in Philadelphia) to instead work with the Harlem Globetrotters as just another opponent of theirs throughout their touring entourage, playing alongside them in certain matches throughout the next decade (as yet another opponent for the world-famous Globetrotters to often, though not always, defeat in their history) before later playing their final game under the Philadelphia Sphas name on October 17, 1959 (under a 68–42 blowout loss to the Globetrotters) and eventually becoming the Baltimore Rockets (with the Rockets later being one of four franchises merged to become the infamous Washington Generals franchise in 1971).

== Background ==
The Sphas played in leagues around Philadelphia since 1917, but game-by-game records before the Sphas rejoined the ABL in 1933 are not (currently) available (at least, not to the general public if official game records did exist for the Sphas) and are therefore likely lost to time itself. After having a significant portion of their coverage being stolen by the newer Basketball Association of America (and to a somewhat lesser extent, the rivaling National Basketball League), the ABL would continue to devolve even further downward from a major professional basketball league to a minor (professional) basketball league in the eyes of the general public by this season. While the president of the BAA, Maurice Podoloff, would try and establish better working relationships with both the rivaling NBL and the ABL (where the Sphas were playing in), to the point of potentially implementing a championship series of sorts between all three of the (perceived) professional basketball leagues at that point in time, the efforts to have each professional basketball league of the era to work things out well enough with each other in the end would ultimately prove to be futile. Because of the continuing downward spiral that the ABL was heading into during this period of time alongside their own financial issues entering this season, the longstanding Philadelphia Sphas would make the tough decision to move their operations from Philadelphia, Pennsylvania to Atlantic City, New Jersey (which previously hosted the Atlantic City Sandpipers / Sand Snipers franchise at one point in the ABL's history) and rebrand themselves into the Atlantic City Tides for this season, with home games for the team being played at the Million Dollar Pier there instead of their usual Broadwood Hotel Ballroom area. However, attendance issues out in Atlantic City throughout the season combined with a new commitment by team owner Eddie Gottlieb to have the team finish up their season properly would lead to the Sphas returning to their original home under their original name to finish up this season properly with as many remaining home games as necessary on their ends by January 16, 1949, following their final game as the Tides five days earlier against the (revived) defending champion Wilkes-Barre Barons.

Originally, when the Philadelphia Sphas moved to Atlantic City, New Jersey to become the Atlantic City Tides at the start of the season, they performed considerably better than they had the previous season, beginning with a 6–1 record and emerging as early contenders to win their eighth ABL championship in what would become their sixteenth season in the revived league, albeit under a new name. However, after their 6–1 start, they went on a 16-game losing streak, some of which involved high-scoring games in which their opponents scored over 100 points. The losing streak also coincided with the Atlantic City Tides later moving out of Atlantic City's Million Dollar Pier and returning to Philadelphia, Pennsylvania, where they became the Philadelphia Sphas once again for the remainder of the season by January 16, 1949. The revived Sphas recorded only two more wins after the end of their losing streak and played their final remaining home games at their former venue in the Broadwood Hotel Ballroom. Combined with the six home games played at the Million Dollar Pier as the Atlantic City Tides, this represented their lowest number of home games in a non-shortened season. The team finished 8-26, their worst season in the ABL, including a final game in which the Sphas scored over 110 points for the first and only time in their ABL history in a 118-116 defeat. They finished last in the league. This season and the previous season also marked the first time the team failed to qualify for the playoffs in consecutive seasons since their early years in leagues that did not have playoffs.

This season would also be the Sphas' last full season of play in the ABL. Despite efforts to schedule home games for the 1949-50 ABL season, including consideration of playing some home games in Wilmington, Delaware, the financial expenses became too great for co-owner Eddie Gottlieb, who by that point was also focused on his new team, Philadelphia Warriors of the now-NBA.

The Sphas were initially given a temporary termination from the league for the 1949–50 ABL season, which would have allowed the team time to address its financial situation and potentially return for the 1950-51 ABL season. There were also discussions about moving the team to Utica, New York. The departure eventually become permanent after Eddie Gottlieb sold the franchise to Abe Saperstein, after which the Sphas became part of the Harlem Globetrotters' barnstorming entourage. They remained in that role until October 16, 1959, when the team was rebranded as the Baltimore Rockets following a final loss to the Globetrotters. The Baltimore Rockets later joined other franchises associated with the Harlem Globetrotters as part of the Washington Generals, a team created by former Philadelphia Sphas player Red Klotz.

== Roster ==
Due to information on American Basketball League players being generally hard to find (especially by the time the ABL was designated more as a minor league during its later years of existence), there are bound to be more gaps and/or inaccuracies found in certain areas on the team's roster spots than usual.

1948–49 Atlantic City Tides / Philadelphia Sphas roster
Players

Pos.	No.	Player	Height	Weight	DOB	From
		Bobby Barnett			Unknown	Unknown
F		Jack Brophy	6 ft 5 in (1.96 m)	180 lb (82 kg)	1928–06–22	La Salle
F		Stan Brown	6 ft 3 in (1.91 m)	200 lb (91 kg)	1929–06–27	South Philadelphia HS (PA)
G/F		Dave Fox	6 ft 2 in (1.88 m)	190 lb (86 kg)	1926–05–24	Temple
C		Gorham Getchell	6 ft 4 in (1.93 m)	205 lb (93 kg)	1920–08–14	Temple
		George Herlich			1923–07–25	Unknown
G		Eddie Lyons			1926–07–01	Temple
		Phil Markoff			1926–12–19	CCNY
G/F		Bill McCahan	5 ft 11 in (1.80 m)	200 lb (91 kg)	1921–06–07	Duke
C		Elmore Morgenthaler	6 ft 9 in (2.06 m)	230 lb (104 kg)	1922–08–03	Boston College
F		Tommy O'Connell	6 ft 2 in (1.88 m)	200 lb (91 kg)	1923–11–10	Albright College
G		Jerry Rullo	5 ft 10 in (1.78 m)	165 lb (75 kg)	1923–06–23	Temple
F		Frank Stanczak	6 ft 1 in (1.85 m)	185 lb (84 kg)	1929–08–17	Roxborough HS (PA)
		Aaron Tanitsky			1926–01–14	Penn
G		Paul Wallace	5 ft 9 in (1.75 m)	140 lb (64 kg)	1925–11–01	Toledo
G/F		Leonard Weiner	6 ft 1 in (1.85 m)	180 lb (82 kg)	1923–10–26	Unknown
		Dave Young			Unknown	Unknown
G/F		Bill Zubic	6 ft 5 in (1.96 m)	205 lb (93 kg)	1918–08–07	Southeast Catholic HS (PA)

Coaches
Head coach
- Harry Litwack

Legend
- (DP) Unsigned draft pick
- (FA) Free agent
- (S) Suspended
- Injured

It's ultimately unknown which players played for the Atlantic City Tides only (though Bill Zubic is slated to play for the Atlantic City Tides only), which players played for the Philadelphia Sphas only, and which players played for both the Atlantic City Tides and Philadelphia Sphas throughout the season, though it's known that a good amount of the players on the team (notably Eddie Lyons, Leonard Weiner, Stan Brown, Aaron Tanitsky, Gorham Getchell, Frank Stanczak, Bill McCahan, and potentially Elmore Morganthaler and Dave Fox) played for both franchise names during this season, with Brown, Lyons, Morganthaler, Tanitsky, and Weiner also previously being a part of the team's original roster at the time the franchise first moved from Philadelphia to Atlantic City. What is also known, though, was that Bobby Barnett and George Herlich were the inaugural two local players from Atlantic City to join the franchise at the time as well.

== ABL Standings ==
Pos.	Team	Wins	Losses	Win %
1	Wilkes-Barre Barons	29	12	.707
2	Scranton Miners	26	15	.634
3	Trenton Tigers	25	16	.610
T–4	Paterson Crescents	24	17	.585
T–4	Bridgeport Newfield Steelers	24	17	.585
6	Hartford Hurricanes / Caps	13	26	.333
7	Brooklyn Gothams	10	30	.250
8	Atlantic City Tides / Philadelphia SPHAs^{[a]}	8	26	.235

The Paterson Crescents would defeat the Bridgeport Newfield Steelers 99–80 on March 26, 1949 in the fourth place tiebreaker match for the season, which would ensure their qualification for the 1949 ABL Playoffs for this season.

== ABL Schedule ==
For the rest of the ABL's entire existence going forward, the ABL would utilize a proper, full regular season instead of two half-seasons for its regular season formatting. However, for this season only, the Sphas would play as the Atlantic City Tides until January 16, 1949, before returning to their original Philadelphia Sphas name for the rest of the season afterward going forward, with home games before January 16, 1949, being played in Atlantic City, New Jersey out in the Million Dollar Pier and home games after it being played in Philadelphia, Pennsylvania out in the Broadwood Hotel instead.^{[a]}

#	Date	Opponent	Score	Record
1	November 9	Hartford Hurricanes / Caps	96–65	1–0
2	November 12	@ Hartford Hurricanes / Caps	94–87	2–0
3	November 16	Paterson Crescents	79–67	3–0
4	November 17	@ Wilkes-Barre Barons	58–71	3–1
5	November 18	Scranton Miners	91–76	4–1
6	December 1	Brooklyn Gothams	79–69	5–1
7	December 7	Bridgeport Newfield Steelers	86–71	6–1
8	December 11	@ Brooklyn Gothams	78–91	6–2
9	December 12	@ Bridgeport Newfield Steelers	67–78	6–3
10	December 17	@ Scranton Miners	85–87	6–4
11	December 18	@ Paterson Crescents	75–92	6–5
12	December 19	@ Trenton Tigers	79–86	6–6
13	December 29	@ Scranton Miners	71–85	6–7
14	January 1	@ Hartford Hurricanes / Caps	72–83	6–8
15	January 2	@ Bridgeport Newfield Steelers	67–85	6–9
16	January 11	Wilkes-Barre Barons	95–107	6–10
17	January 12	@ Wilkes-Barre Barons	85–104	6–11
18	January 15	@ Brooklyn Gothams	79–85	6–12
19	January 16	@ Hartford Hurricanes / Caps	69–103	6–13
20	January 30	@ Trenton Tigers	82–86	6–14
21	February 3	Trenton Tigers	78–90	6–15
22	February 5	@ Paterson Crescents	73–88	6–16
23	February 6	@ Scranton Miners	77–82	6–17
24	February 10	Brooklyn Gothams	58–54	7–17
25	February 17	Wilkes-Barre Barons	57–87	7–18
26	February 20	@ Paterson Crescents	85–90	7–19
27	February 26	@ Brooklyn Gothams	77–93	7–20
28	March 1	Paterson Crescents	87–97	7–21
29	March 2	Wilkes-Barre Barons	84–104	7–22
30	March 6	@ Bridgeport Newfield Steelers	90–83	8–22
31	March 11	@ Trenton Tigers	96–105	8–23
32	March 13	@ Scranton Miners	65–82	8–24
33	March 23	@ Bridgeport Newfield Steelers	85–95	8–25
34	March 25	@ Trenton Tigers	116–118	8–26

== Notes ==
^{a} Before this season began, the Philadelphia Sphas moved from Philadelphia, Pennsylvania to Atlantic City, New Jersey to become the Atlantic City Tides in an effort to survive for the long-term. However, after having disappointing attendance results for home games at the Million Dollar Pier in Atlantic City, the team returned to Philadelphia to become the Sphas once again for the rest of the season going forward into their existence on January 16, 1949, with them playing their final home games as a professional basketball team back at their primary home court in the ballroom area of the Broadwood Hotel.
