= John Postley =

American basketball player (1940-1970)

Personal information
- Born: May 30, 1940
- Died: July 31, 1970 (aged 30) Philadelphia, Pennsylvania, U.S.
- Listed height: 6 ft 5 in (1.96 m)
- Listed weight: 220 lb (100 kg)

Career information
- High school: Benjamin Franklin (Philadelphia, Pennsylvania)
- Playing career: 1963–1970
- Position: Power forward / center

Career history
- 1963–1964: Williamsport Billies
- 1967: Pittsburgh Pipers
- 1967–1970: Wilkes-Barre Barons

Career highlights
- EPBL champion (1969); EPBL rebounding leader (1970)

Career EBA statistics
- Points: 1,008 (9.8 ppg)
- Rebounds: 1,155 (11.2 rpg)
- Games: 406
- Stats at Basketball Reference

John Postley (May 30, 1940 – July 31, 1970) was an American basketball player. Despite not playing high school or college basketball, he played professionally for several years.

== Playing career ==
Postley was discovered by John Chaney, and signed him with his team, the Williamsport Billies in the Eastern Professional Basketball League (EPBL), in 1963. In 1964, he signed with the Camden Bullets but did not end up playing for the team. In September 1966, while a member of the Allentown Jets, Postley was stabbed by brothers Richard and Joseph L. Thomas at the Liberty Bell Park Racetrack.

In 1967, Postley signed with the New Jersey Americans of the American Basketball Association (ABA) but was released before the start of the season. He later joined the Pittsburgh Pipers of the ABA where he appeared in one game before returning to the EPBL and joining the Wilkes-Barre Barons. Prior to the 1968–1969 season, he signed with the Philadelphia 76ers but was cut before the start of the season.

Postley rejoined the Barrons and in 1968–69, he was one of the league leaders in rebounds and assists. He won an EPBL championship with the Barons in 1969. The following season, Postley led the league in rebounds.

== Boxing career ==
Postley was an amateur boxer and won 37 fights without a loss between 1960 and 1963.

== Death ==
Postley collapsed and died from a heart attack in a pro-am league game on July 31, 1970, in Philadelphia at age 30.

== See also ==
- List of basketball players who died during their careers
