= Atlantic City Boardwalk =

Entertainment strip in New Jersey, US

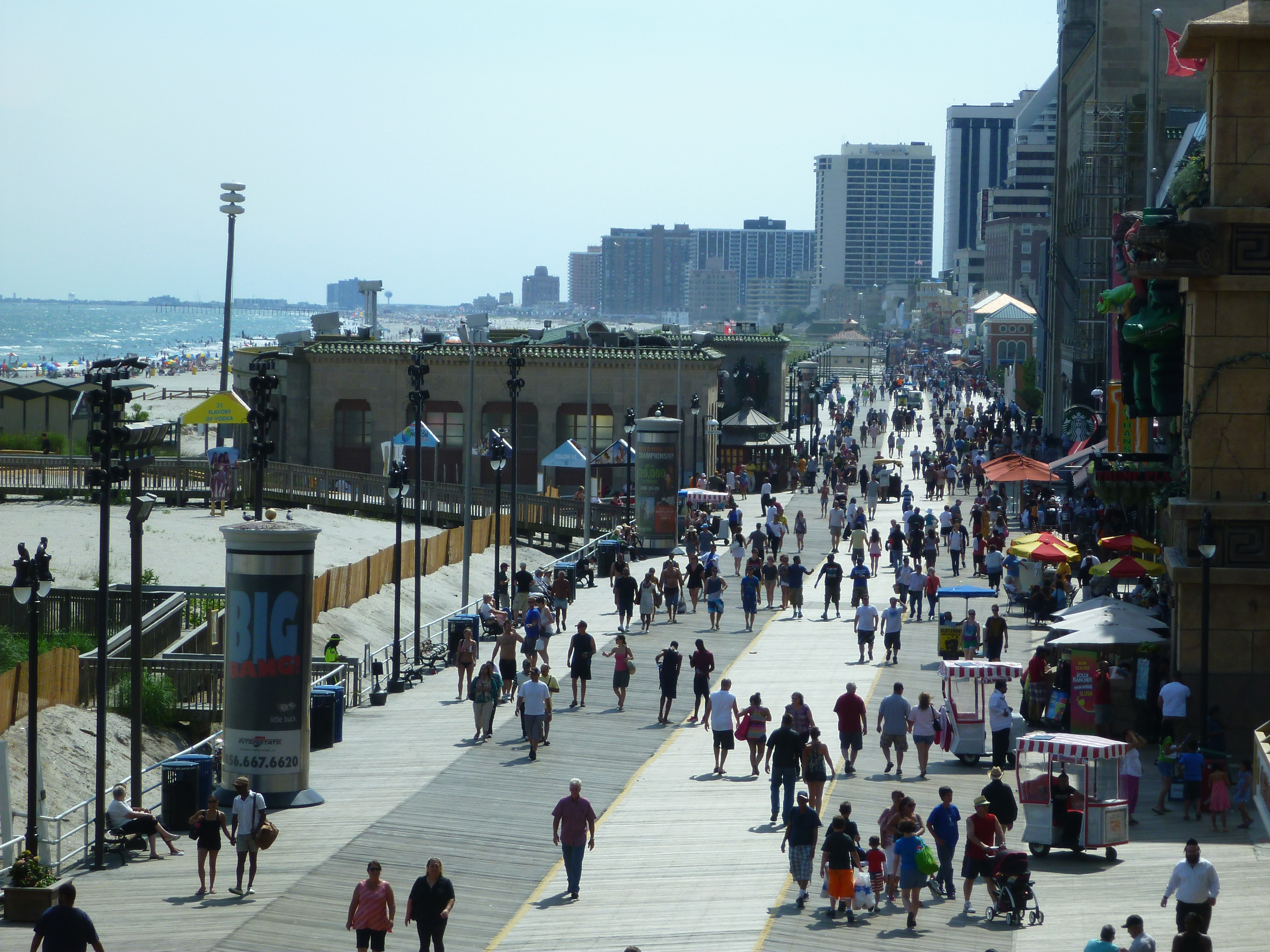
- View of the boardwalk
- Interactive map of Atlantic City Boardwalk
- Location: Atlantic City, New Jersey, U.S.
- Coordinates: 39°20′59″N 74°27′03″W
- Area: 5.5 to 5.75 miles (8.85 to 9.25 km) long
- Opened: June 26, 1870; 156 years ago
- Status: Open

The Atlantic City Boardwalk is an oceanfront boardwalk in Atlantic City, New Jersey, United States. Opened in 1870, it is the oldest, longest, and busiest boardwalk in the world.

The Atlantic City Boardwalk is 5 1/2 to 5 3/4 miles (8.9 to 9.3 km) long, the world's longest. The Boardwalk starts at Absecon Inlet in the north and runs along the beach south-west to the city limit 4 mi (6.4 km) away then continues 1 1/2 mi (2.4 km) into Ventnor City. Casino/hotels front the boardwalk, as well as retail stores, restaurants, and amusements. Notable attractions include the Boardwalk Hall, House of Blues, and the Ripley's Believe It or Not! museum.

== History ==
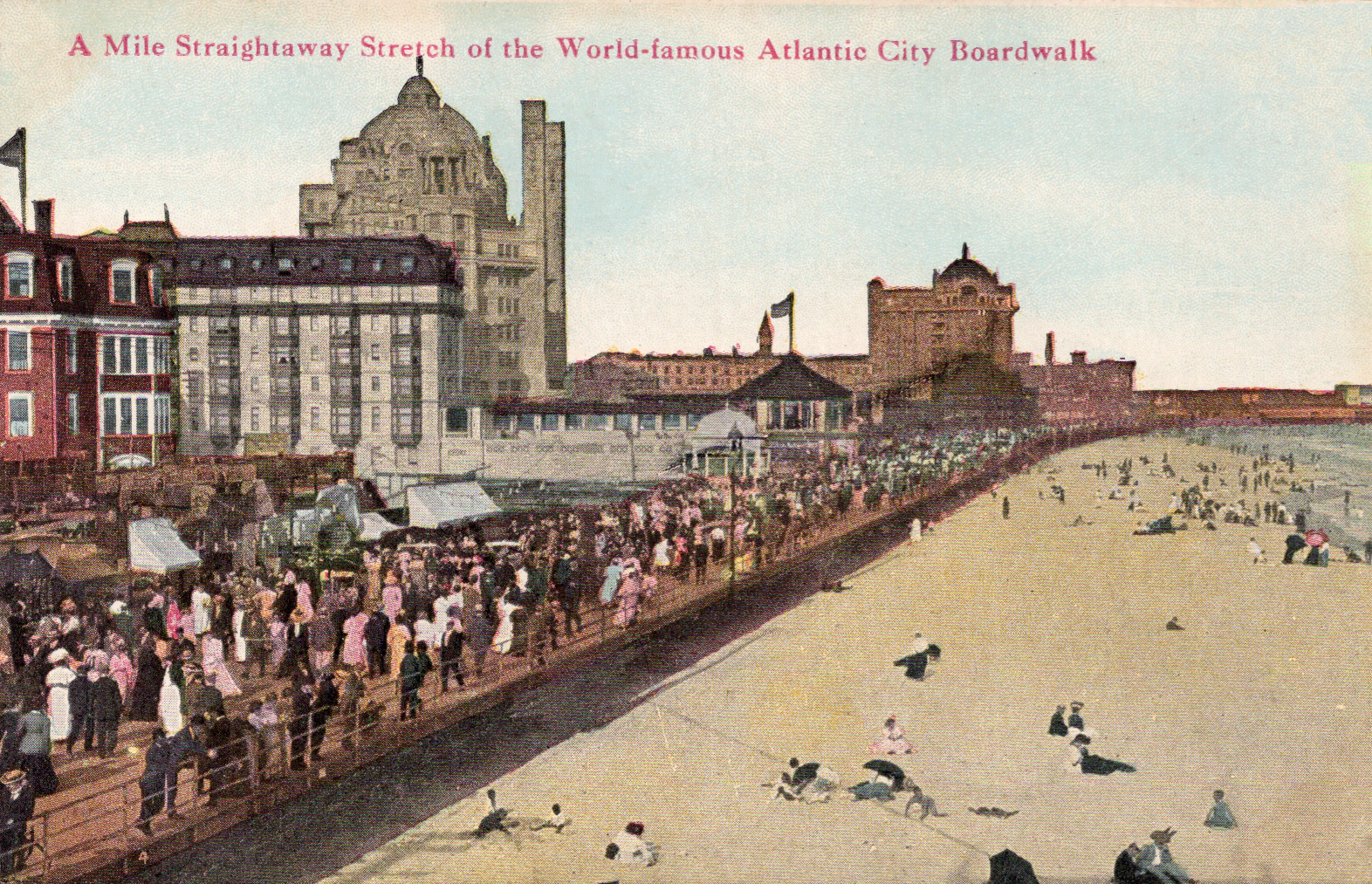
Postcard from the 1910s

The boardwalk in Atlantic City, New Jersey in 1908

It opened on June 26, 1870. When it opened, it was a temporary structure erected for the summer season that was the first boardwalk in the world. The first pier along the boardwalk, Applegate's Pier, opened in 1884. It was acquired by John L. Young in 1891, who expanded and operated it as Young's Ocean Pier, but it was mostly destroyed in a 1912 fire. The remaining part of the pier was rebuilt in 1922 as the Central Pier, which is still in operation.

A Heinz-owned pier named Heinz Pier was destroyed in the 1944 Great Atlantic hurricane.

The most famous Atlantic City pier was Steel Pier, which opened in 1898, and which once billed itself as "The Showplace of the Nation". It closed in 1978, and was mostly destroyed in a 1982 fire. It was rebuilt in the late 1980s and is now operated as an amusement pier across from the Hard Rock.

Steeplechase Pier opened in 1899 and operated until 1986. It suffered significant damage in a 1988 fire, and the remnants of the pier were removed in 1996. The "Steeplechase Pier Heliport" on Steel Pier is named in its honor. In October 2012, Hurricane Sandy destroyed the northern part of the boardwalk fronting Absecon Inlet, in the residential section called South Inlet. The oceanfront boardwalk in front of the Atlantic City casinos survived the storm with minimal damage.

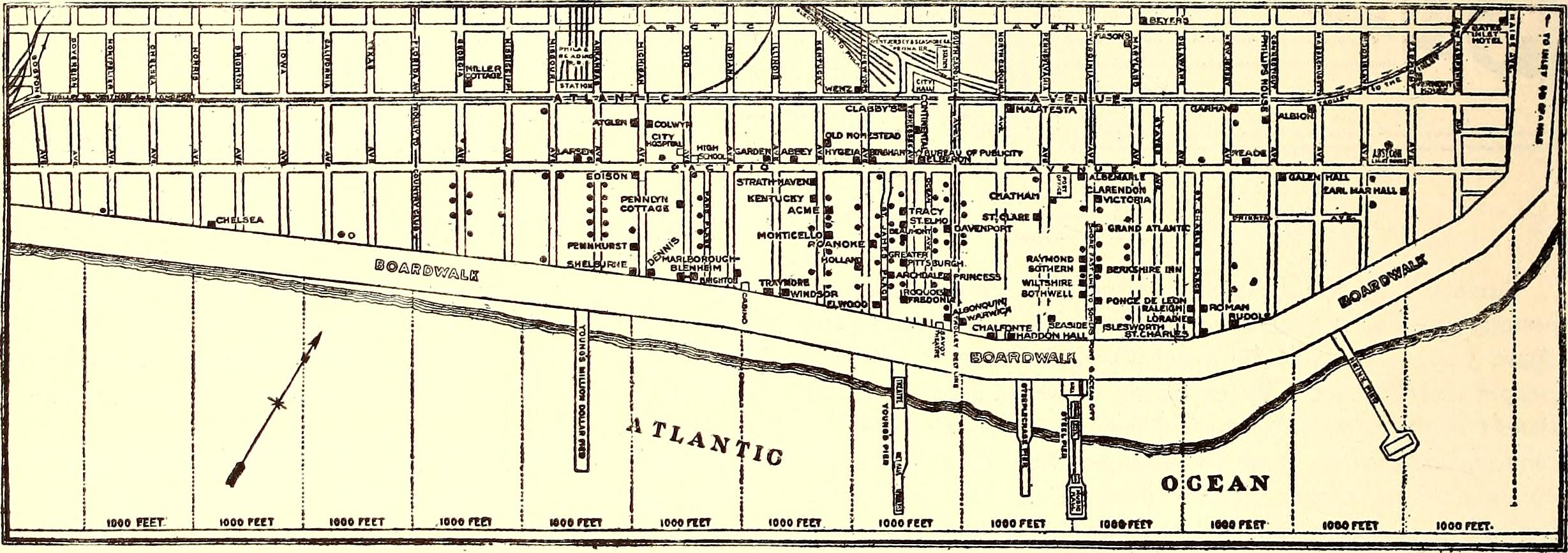
1907 Boardwalk map

Captain John L. Young opened "Young's Million Dollar Pier" in 1906, and on the seaward side "erected a marble mansion", fronted by a formal garden, with lighting and landscaping designed by Young's longtime friend Thomas Alva Edison. Million Dollar Pier once rivaled Steel Pier as Atlantic City's leading pier, but after suffering decades of decline, was rebuilt into a shopping mall in the 1980s, known as "Shops on Ocean One". In 2006, the Ocean One mall was bought, renovated and re-branded as "The Pier Shops at Caesars" and in 2015, it was renamed "Playground Pier". In September 2023, it was renamed "ACX1 Studios" for the film and entertainment production studios that took over the building, with a planned grand reopening containing a mixture of retail, restaurants, creative space, and production studios in summer of 2024.

== See also ==
- List of boardwalks in the United States
