= Leonard Poole =

American basketball player (1946–1965)

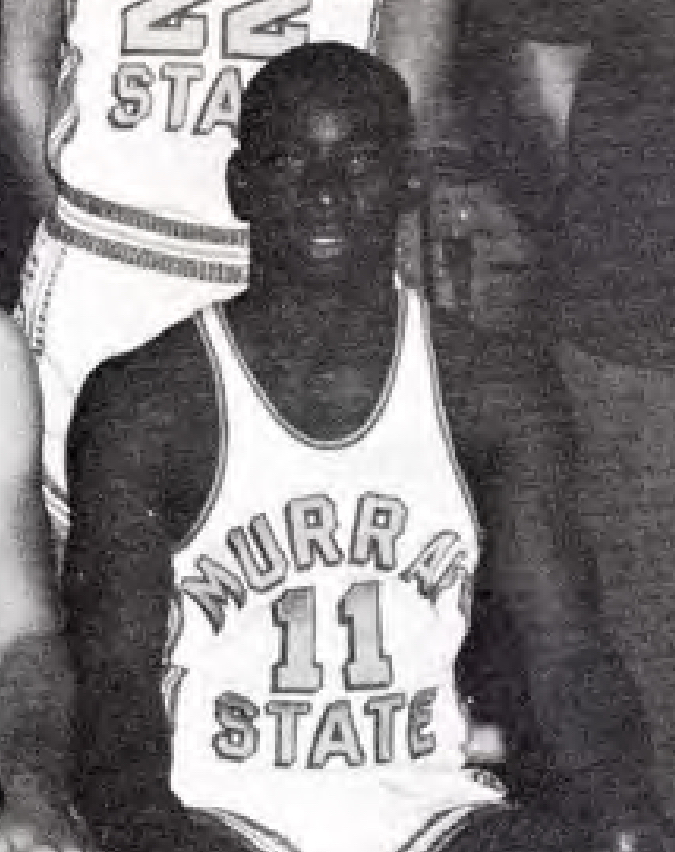
- Poole with the Murray State Racers, c. 1964

Personal information
- Born: September 3, 1946 Kentucky, U.S.
- Died: July 27, 1965 (aged 18) Breckinridge County, Kentucky, U.S.
- Listed height: 5 ft 9 in (1.75 m)

Career information
- High school: Breckinridge County (Harned, Kentucky)
- Position: Guard
- Number: 11

Leonard Poole (September 3, 1946 – July 27, 1965) was an American basketball player. He attended Breckinridge County High School in Kentucky and led the basketball team to second place in the state championship during his senior season in 1964. Poole committed to play college basketball for the Murray State Racers and was selected as the most valuable player of their freshman team during the 1964–65 season. He was expected to become a starting guard for the Racers varsity team as a sophomore. Poole drowned in the Rough River Lake during the 1965 off-season.

== Early life ==
Poole was born to Leonard Poole Sr. and had one brother.

Poole played basketball as a guard for Breckinridge County High School alongside Butch Beard. When Beard was injured during Poole's senior year, Poole was shifted to the position of center despite standing at 5 ft 9 in (1.75 m) and out-rebounded opponents who were a foot taller than him. On February 2, 1964, Poole scored 72 points in a 126–57 victory over Flat Gap High School to set a new school record. Poole led Breckinridge County to qualify for the 1964 state basketball tournament. In the championship game against Seneca High School, Poole was matched up against their center Wes Unseld and scored a team-high 20 points in a 66–56 loss.

Poole concluded his season averaging a team-high 24.8 points and more than 12 rebounds per game. He was one of the most sought-after players of his class in Kentucky. On April 25, 1964, he signed an athletic scholarship with Murray State College (now Murray State University).

== College career ==
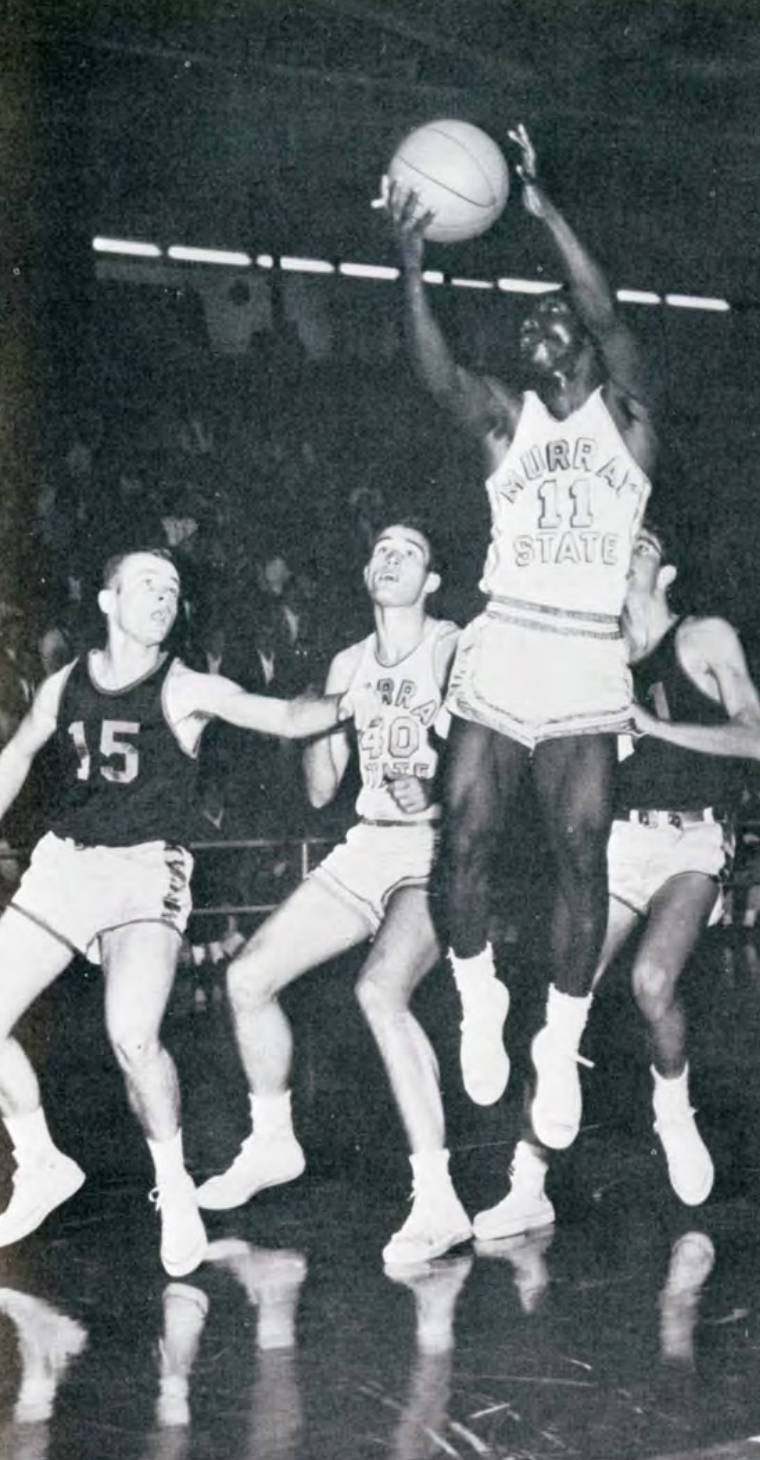
Poole jumps for a layup during the 1964–65 season

Poole played on the Racers freshman basketball team alongside Dick Cunningham. He averaged 24.6 points per game during the 1964–65 season. Poole was selected as the team's most valuable player at the end of the season.

Poole was expected to be one of the starting guards for the Racers varsity team during the 1965–66 season. Racers head coach, Cal Luther, claimed that Poole "would have been one of the outstanding guards in the league" during his sophomore season. Weldon Grimsley of the Paducah Sun-Democrat wrote that "many felt [Poole] was destined to become probably the greatest basketball player ever to attend Murray State College."

== Player profile ==
Poole was nicknamed "Mr. Zippo" because of his speed and daring on the court. He was regarded for his diverse scoring abilities. Poole was "a fine ball handler" and "good on defense." Despite his short stature, he "could jump like a deer" and was called for goaltending six times during his freshman season with the Racers. Poole had a reputation for whistling "like he was calling a dog" while playing which "upset most of his opponents that he was guarding."

== Death ==
On July 27, 1965, Poole drowned in the Rough River Lake near Leitchfield, Kentucky. He had been on an outing with his brother and two cousins. Witnesses saw Poole floating on an inner-tube when he lost his handle of it and drowned because he could not swim. His body was recovered by the Leitchfield Rescue Squad.

Poole's teammates from the 1964 Breckinridge County team, including Beard, served as the pallbearers at his funeral. He was buried in the Hardinsburg Cemetery in Hardinsburg, Kentucky.

== See also ==
- List of basketball players who died during their careers
