= Nilay Aydoğan =

Turkish basketball player (1992–2023)

Personal information
- Born: 6 May 1992 Turkey
- Died: 12 February 2023 (aged 30) Malatya, Turkey
- Listed height: 180 cm (5 ft 11 in)

Career information
- Playing career: 2015–2023
- Position: Forward
- Number: 46

Career history
- 2015–2016: Izmit
- 2016–2017: Yalova
- 2017: Tosyali Toyo Osmaniye
- 2018: Samsun B.K.
- 2018–2020: Çankaya Üniversitesi
- 2020–2021: Yalova
- 2021–2022: Mersin
- 2022–2023: Çankaya Üniversitesi

Career highlights
- No. 46 retired by Çankaya Üniversitesi

Nilay Aydoğan (6 May 1992 – 12 February 2023) was a Turkish professional basketball player. During her career, she played for Osmaniye, Yalova, Mersin, Samsun B.K. and Çankaya Üniversitesi. Aydoğan played for the Turkey women's national team. She was killed in the 2023 Turkey–Syria earthquake.

== Death ==
Aydogan died in Malatya as a result of the 2023 Turkey–Syria earthquake while on a visit to her grandmother. Following her death, her No. 46 jersey was retired by Çankaya Üniversitesi and the Turkish Basketball Federation dedicated the 2022–2023 season to her.

== See also ==
- List of basketball players who died during their careers
