= ACX1 Studios =

Multi-use facility in Atlantic City, New Jersey

ACX-1 Studios
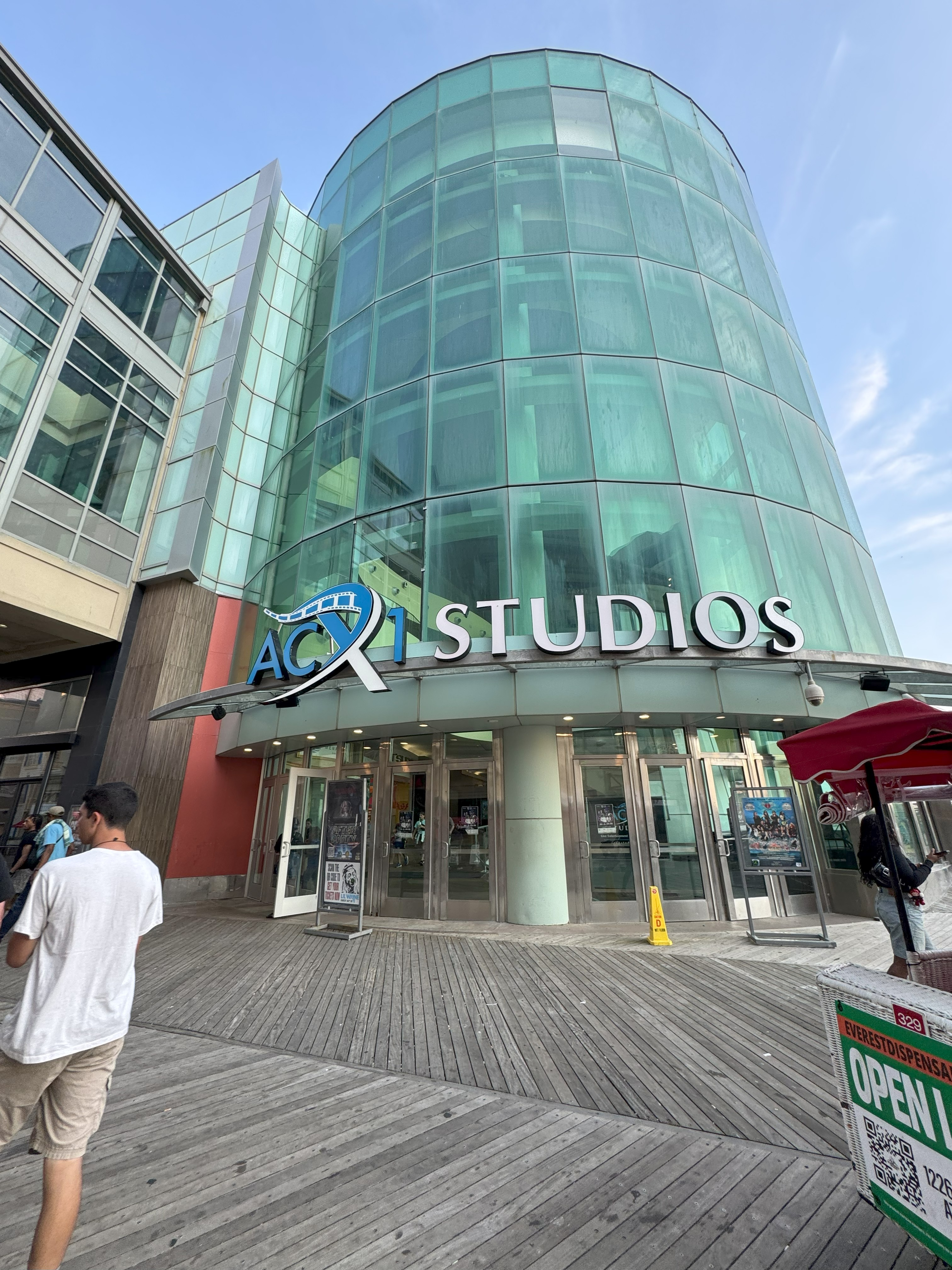
- ACX1 Studios in August 2025
- Location: Atlantic City, New Jersey, U.S.
- Coordinates: 39.3538°N 74.4342°W
- Address: 1 Atlantic Ocean
- Opened: 1906
- Developer: ACX1 Studios
- Owner: ACX1 Studios (leasing the pier from Caesars Enterprises)
- Floor area: 303,788 square feet (28,222.8 m^{2})
- Floors: 4
- Parking: 3,000 spaces in parking garage at Caesars
- Website: www.acx1studios.com

ACX1 Studios was a four-story 550,000-square-foot multi-use facility on a beach pier on the boardwalk in Atlantic City, New Jersey. The pier has hosted a variety of attractions and shopping experiences since it was first built in the early twentieth century. The pier reopened as a film production studio, music incubator, and entertainment venue in 2024 to host film shoots attracted to the robust South Jersey-specific film tax credits.

== Background ==
ACX1 Studios is the successor to the famed Million Dollar Pier, which operated on the site from 1906 to 1981, and the Ocean One shopping mall pier which operated there from 1983 to 2003. In 2006 the pier opened as The Pier Shops at Caesars, and was renamed the Playground Pier in 2015. The pier held many upscale stores, such as Tourneau, Gucci, Louis Vuitton, A|X Armani Exchange, but was plagued with high vacancy rates by the late 2010s, resulting in it becoming a "dead mall."

Located at the foot of Arkansas Avenue, the pier is connected to Caesars Atlantic City via a second-story skybridge, and is about 900 feet long, with its far end extending over the Atlantic Ocean.

=== ACX1 Studios ===
On September 14, 2023, the pier was reopened with the new name ACX1 Studios as a live entertainment, movie, music, and production pier. The concept of the pier includes a combination of retail, restaurants, entertainment, educational space, and music and film industry production space. ACX1 executives have claimed they hope Atlantic City will turn into the "Hollywood of the East" starting with their revitalization.

The ACX1 production studios within the building plans to use most of the buildings for television and film production, with up to 150 sets, hoping to attract major film companies and actors to the area. According to the production company, the mall does not need major renovations or changes, and things such as old restaurants can be reutilized to film restaurant scenes as one example, as long as they remove the signs. The studios mentioned the location is ideal because filming, editing, and lodging for production crew is all conveniently located nearby. In addition to the production studios, the studio is working with tenants to open new restaurants and re-open the wedding venue.

The company also plans on having dedicated creative spaces such as music and arts studios, rehearsal spaces, and teaching spaces. Their plans include a music incubator which will include music studios, festivals and conferences, educational entertainment panels, rehearsal space, a large sync-licensing department, and more. Planned tenants include the Laff House Atlantic City comedy club, an ACX1 brewery, and a barcade-like attraction, as well as retaining current tenants such as ITS SUGAR, all of which can also be utilized for film production. In March 2026, ACX1 Studios filed for Chapter 11 bankruptcy protection.

== History ==
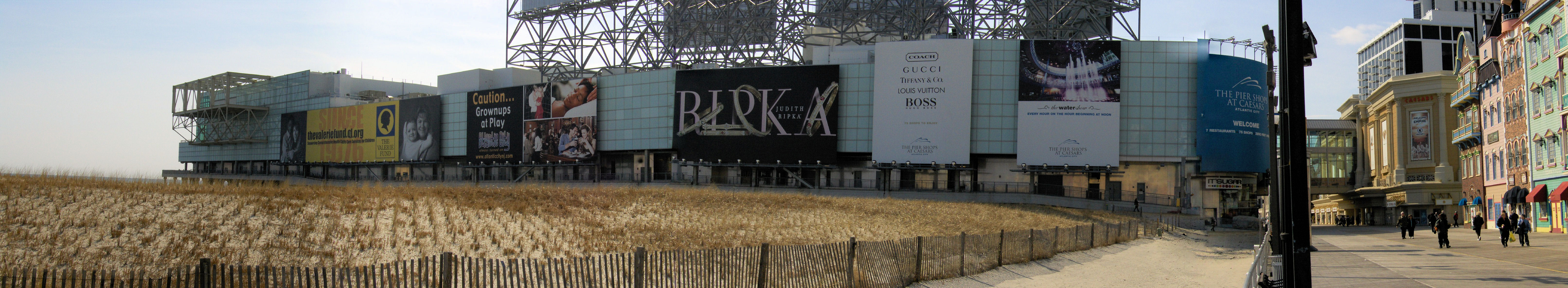
Panoramic view of The Pier Shops at Caesars

=== Million Dollar Pier (1906–1981) ===
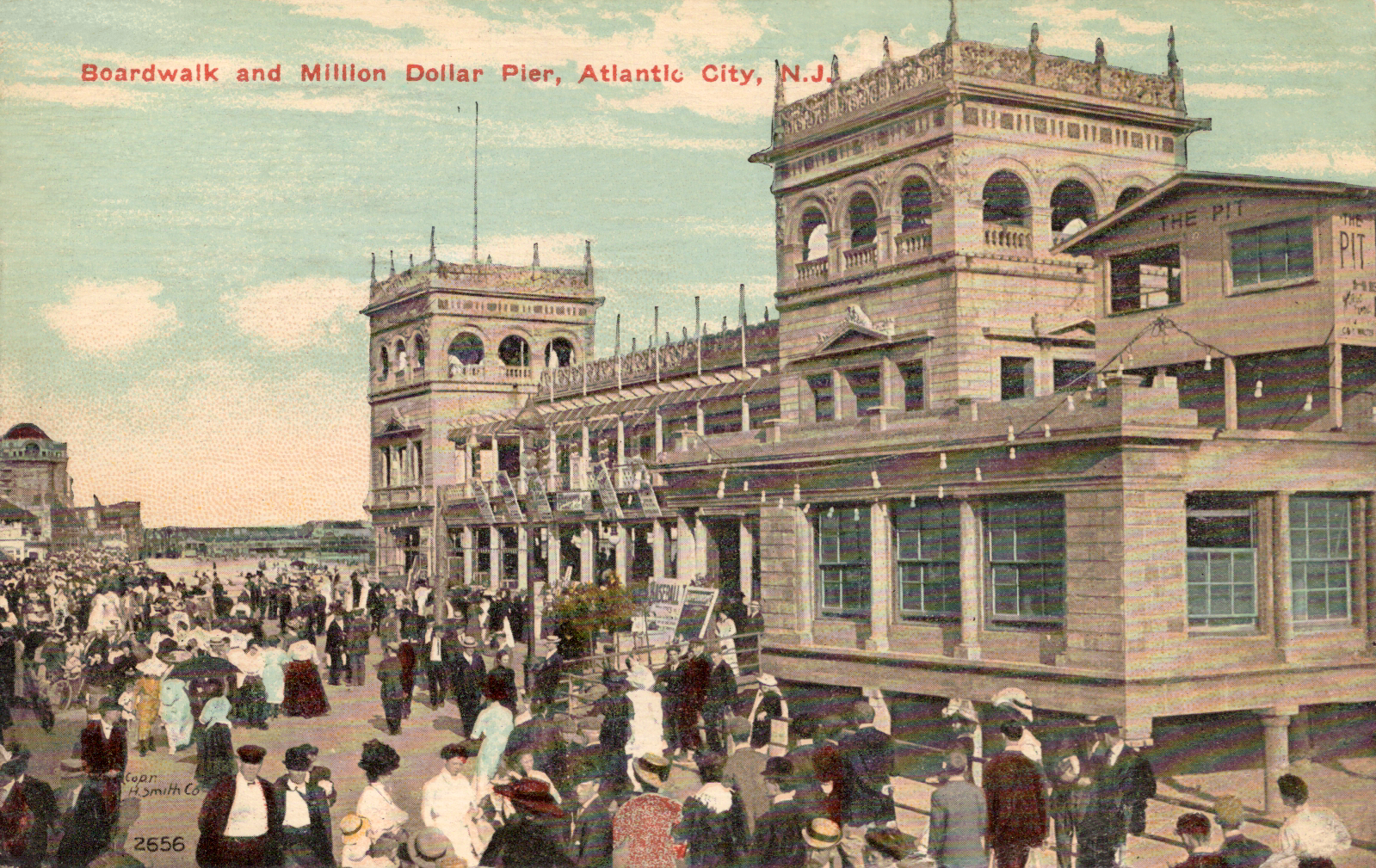
Million Dollar Pier circa 1910s

Million Dollar Pier was built by Captain John L. Young in partnership with Kennedy Crossan a builder from Philadelphia. Young was an experienced showman who in 1891 had begun operating Young's Ocean Pier in Atlantic City (on the site where Central Pier was later located). In 1906 he announced that he was going to build a new pier "to cost a million dollars!" at the foot of Arkansas Avenue. The new pier opened as Young's Million Dollar Pier on July 26, 1906, with a length of 1,900 feet (580 m). It was owned by Associated Realties Company, a corporation that was owned by Young and Crossan. The Million Dollar Pier had what was claimed to be the world's largest ballroom, as well as a Hippodrome Theater with 4,000 seats, Exhibit Hall, Greek Temple, aquarium and a roller skating rink. In 1908 Young built a mansion on the pier for himself, with the address as "No. 1 Atlantic Ocean". At the ocean end of the pier, there were daily fish net hauls that were often directed by Captain Young himself.

Million Dollar Pier in 1978

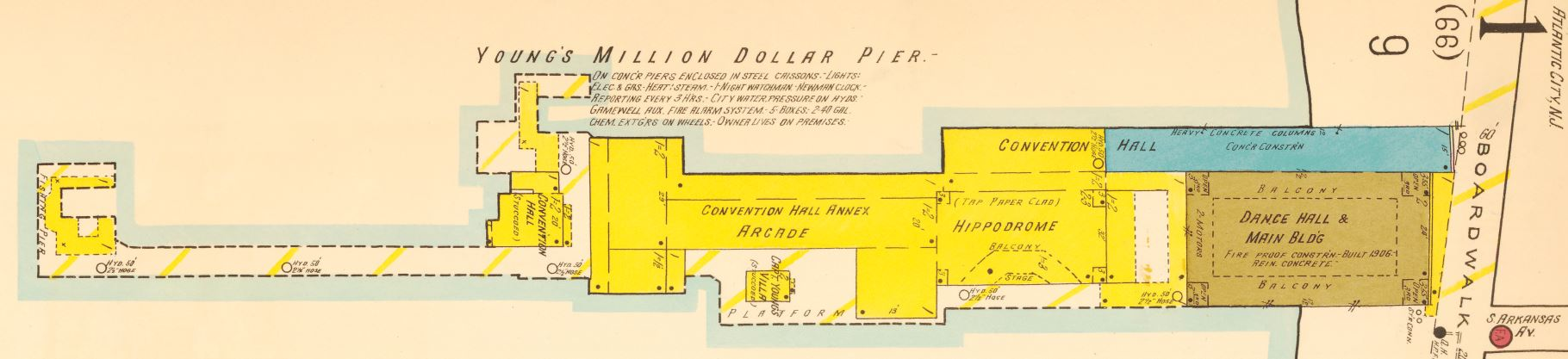
1921 Sanborn Map of Million Dollar Pier

During its early decades, the pier also hosted many conventions and events, including the 1925 Miss America Pageant. Dance Marathons were held at the pier from 1931 to 1933. During the 1930s the pier offered a circus, vaudeville acts, orchestras, movies, net hauls and swimming (with locker facilities provided). The pier, however, struggled financially and its owner, Associated Realties Company, went into bankruptcy in 1936. The reorganized company that emerged from bankruptcy was still owned by members of the Crossan family, but Captain Young was no longer its president. Young died at his winter home in West Palm Beach, Florida on February 15, 1938 at the age of 84.

George Hamid, a circus owner, took over operations of the pier in 1938. Hamid undertook an extensive renovation program to modernize the pier, which was rebranded as Hamid's Million Dollar Pier. In 1945 Hamid bought the Steel Pier, but continued to operate the Million Dollar Pier until late 1948.

1949 proved to be a pivotal, chaotic and disastrous year for the Million Dollar Pier. First, during the month of January, the Atlantic City Tides, a professional basketball team from the (original) American Basketball League that had been acquired the previous year, would move out of their new home venue at the Million Dollar Pier due to poor home attendance and instead return to their original home in Philadelphia, Pennsylvania to play as the Philadelphia Sphas once more to finish out their final professional basketball season at the old Broadwood Hotel. In February 1949 the pier was leased to a New York syndicate headed by George J. Costello for a period of five years. When the pier opened for the 1949 season, no admission fee was charged for the first time in pier history. Instead, customers paid a separate charge for each amusement in which they wanted to partake. By early July, the pier was again charging an admission fee (20 cents), but dropped it by the end of July. Some planned entertainment could not be provided, and at least one featured performer quit by late July. Pier owner Associated Realties Company instituted litigation to terminate Costello's lease of the pier on the grounds that he had breached the lease by closing parts of the pier early and by failing to spend $25,000 on pier improvements. Shortly after the eviction suit was filed, an arsonist set fire to the pier on September 13, 1949. The fire caused extensive damage and about 300 feet of the pier, including the ballroom, skating rink and aquarium, were destroyed, with the damage concentrated near the Boardwalk end of the pier. In late September, a judge terminated Costello's lease of the pier.

When the pier reopened for the 1950 season, the area closest to the Boardwalk that was previously occupied by the ballroom was an open deck containing rides, concessions and other attractions. Admission to the pier was free, with guests charged separately for partaking in amusements. The pier would be run this way until it closed in 1981. From 1950 to 1969 the pier was managed by Max Tubis, who became a part-owner of the pier in 1963.

In 1953 Captain Young's former mansion, No. 1 Atlantic Ocean, was demolished. The pier suffered relatively minor damage in a 1957 fire caused by an electrical short in a sign on the old Hippodrome Theater, which by that time was used for storage. During Hurricane Donna in September 1960 the pier lost a 50-foot section over the ocean. This damage was not repaired, which prevented net hauls from continuing. The pier was purchased by a group of local businessmen in 1969. By 1970 there were several sections of disconnected pier fragments over the ocean, which gave the pier a dilapidated appearance. In 1970 the old Hippodrome Theater building was demolished to add space for more amusements. In 1980 a new pier owner, shopping mall developer Kravco Inc., announced plans to build a new shopping mall pier on the site that would house stores and restaurants. In October 1981, while the pier was being demolished, a suspicious fire destroyed much of what was left of Million Dollar Pier. The remnants of the old pier were then removed, and a completely new pier built.

=== Ocean One (1983–2003) ===
Ocean One in 1985

In late April 1983 the new 900-foot-long 200-foot-wide pier, called Ocean One, opened. The new pier was constructed by Kravco Inc., a shopping mall developer, which replaced the wooden deck and pilings with concrete and steel. The new pier was an attempt to bring families to the resort city which was by this point most known for its casinos, and was losing lots of non-casino visitors, particularly families. The mall was built in order to cater to tourists who would visit the city, and the developers believed that the amusement rides of the past were no longer attractive as a destination, rather believing that the mall could help facilitate non-casino tourism back into Atlantic City and contribute heavily to urban renewal. It was the first non-gaming development in Atlantic City since the legalization of gambling in 1977, which had hurt businesses along the boardwalk. It was named Ocean One because of the address of Capt. John L. Young's mansion at the end of Million Dollar Pier.

Ocean One interior in 1985

Ocean One was a three-story $40 million shopping mall and restaurant complex that was shaped like an ocean liner, featuring portholes, masts, and sailor-uniformed employees. The mall was to provide 750 permanent jobs and 750 seasonal jobs. At opening, Ocean One contained 60 shops, a German restaurant, and 20 fast food stands. Ocean One featured 125 stores, 28 fast food establishments, 8 restaurants, a giant television screen, and a "World's Fair-type 'American Celebration' Hall". The bottom two floors featured fashion boutiques, jewelry stores, and bookstores, with restaurants being located on the third floor. The first floor also contained a theater. The second floor had fast food stands were arranged in a semi-circle next to a mezzanine with seating for 1,300. The restaurants would be casually, moderately priced, and family oriented as to not compete to the finer dining of the casinos. The third floor featured 300 deck chairs, bocce, shuffleboard and horseshoe courts, and mini-golf, as well as room for live band performances.

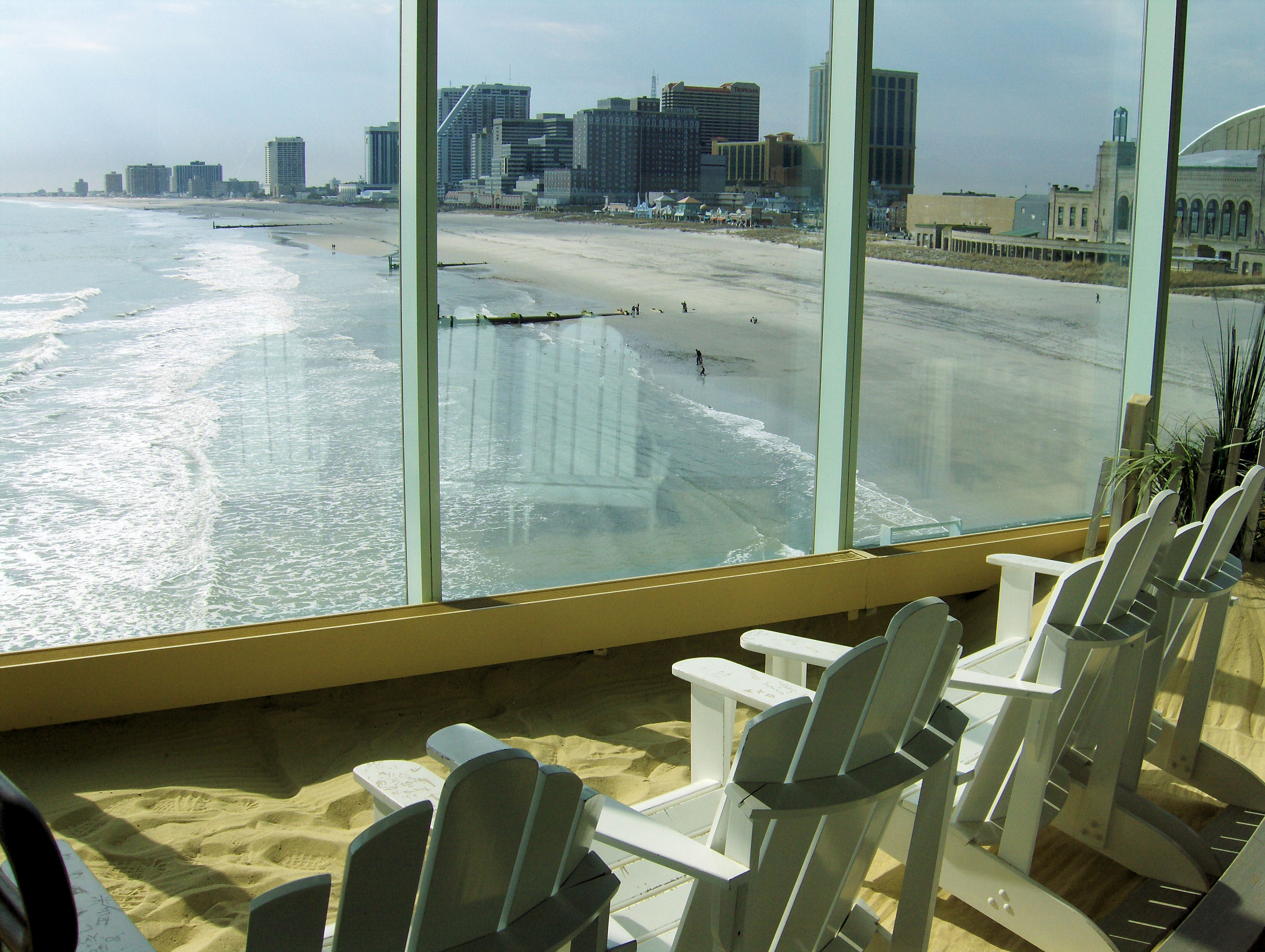
The Beach at The Pier

=== Pier at Caesars and Playground Pier (2006–2023) ===
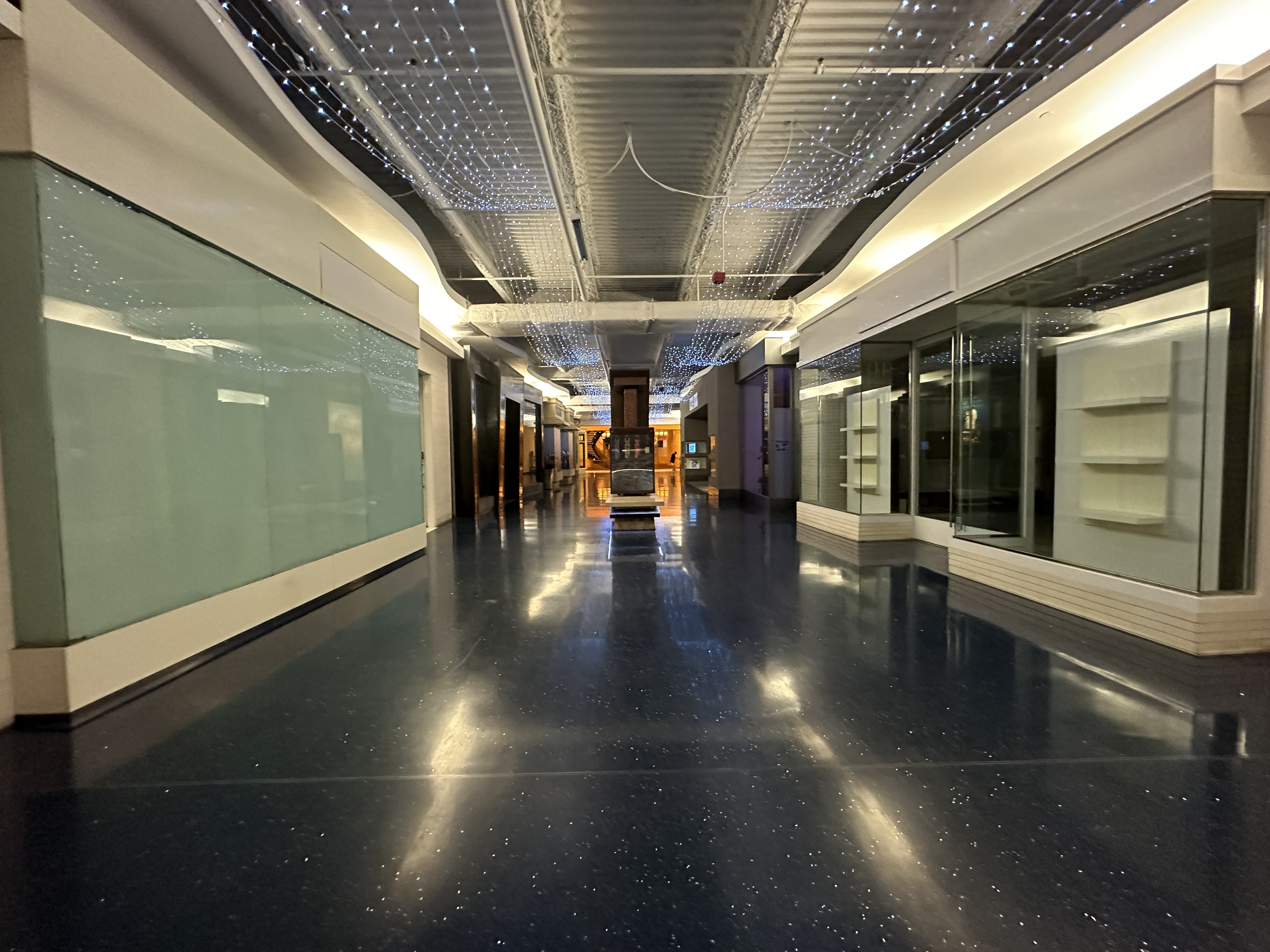
The west wing on the second level once held stores including True Religion, Bottega Veneta, Burberry, Gucci, Mulberry, COACH, Michael Kors, Louis Vuitton, Baccarat, and White Lotus Boutique.

The Ocean One Mall was acquired in 2002 by Gordon Group Holdings and underwent a major redevelopment. Ocean One was torn down to its skeleton and when the pier reopened in 2006 it was renamed The Pier Shops at Caesars. In 2007 Taubman Centers purchased the center.

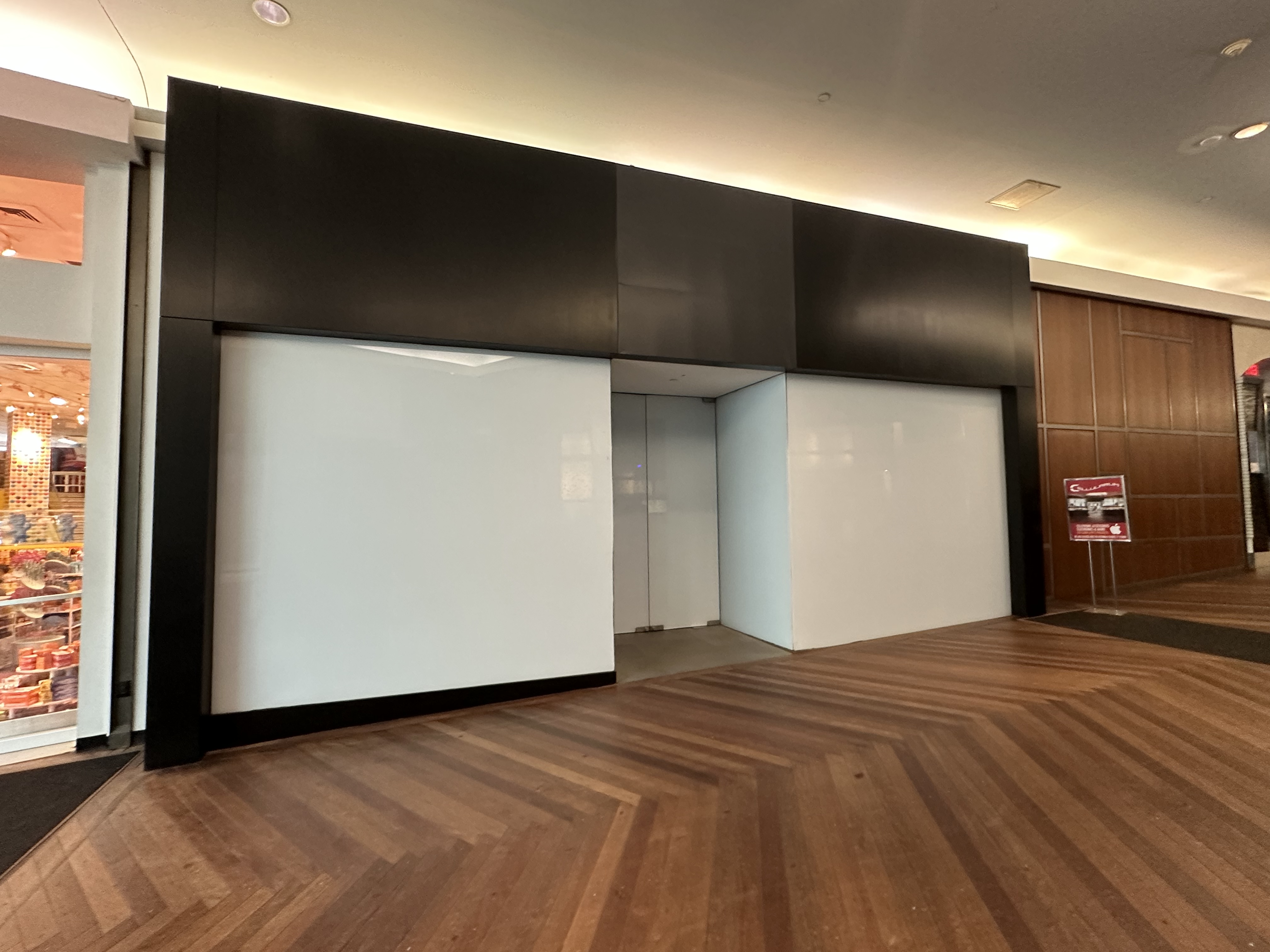
Former Apple Store, Boardwalk Level

Taubman Centers defaulted on its $135 million loan on the center in 2010, and it was taken over by its mortgage servicer, C-III Capital Partners. The lenders failed to successfully auction the mall and hired Cushman & Wakefield to manage the center. In the 2010s after Taubman's bankruptcy, vacancy problems began to plague the pier, part of the wider problem of "ghost malls" in the United States with the rise of competition from Internet shopping retailers, as well as Atlantic City struggling with the steady expansion of casino gaming to other states. Originally, there were over 75 stores at the Pier during its thriving period; this number fell to 59 stores in 2013.

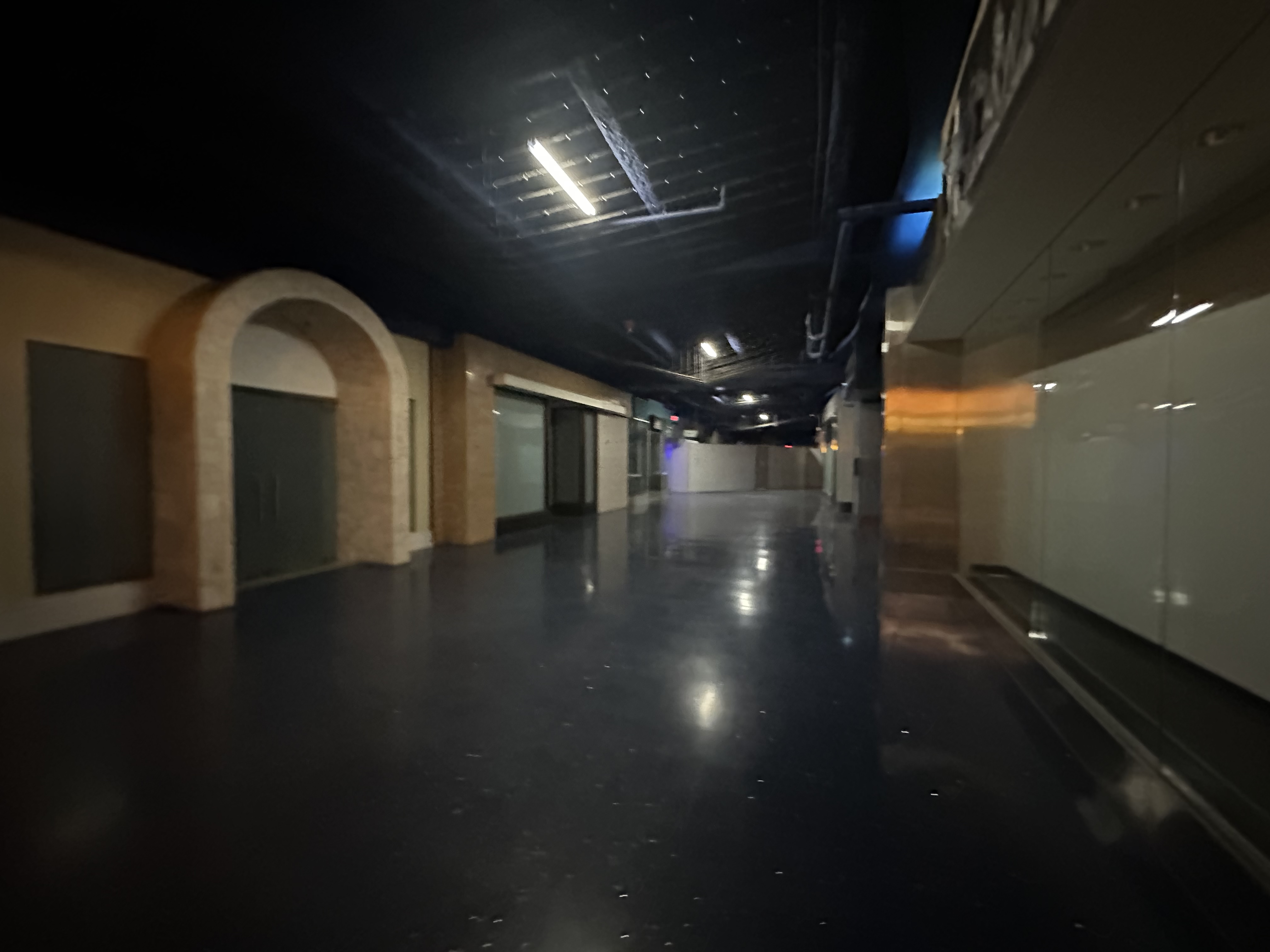
The abandoned east wing on the 2nd level of the mall. This wing once held stores including Made In Italy, Movado, Sole Mio Sunglasses, Guess?, Janie And Jack, Sunglass Hut, André, Ann Taylor, Banana Republic, and Betsey Johnson.

On June 26, 2015, the center was renamed Playground Pier. By 2019, the Playground Pier had been much reduced to only 10 current stores. Choice retailers such as the Apple Store, Tommy Bahama, and Gucci failed to renew leases and left, with only the restaurants on the third floor staying.

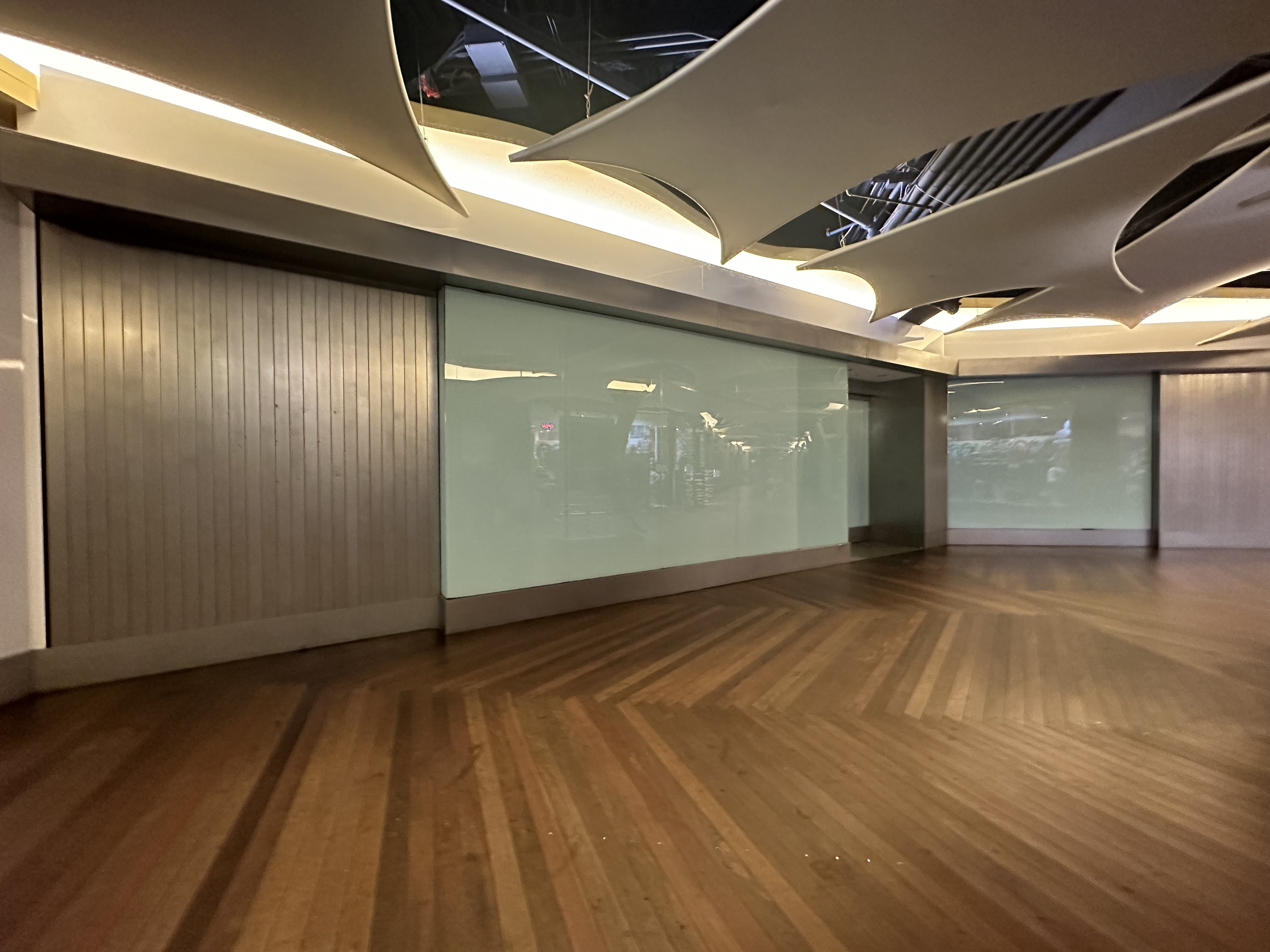
Former A|X Armani Exchange; Boardwalk Level

In early 2020 the pier was sold by Bart Blatstein to a subsidiary of Caesars Entertainment.

Caesars Entertainment stated they are investing money to get shops and restaurants into the pier to get it up to the 75+ stores and restaurants it once had in its heyday. Needed renovations would also be completed.

==== Floors ====
As configured after the pier's 2006 reopening, the mall's four floors have been:

- The Boardwalk (first floor): The floor on this level is designed to look like the Atlantic City Boardwalk with shops that tend to focus around gifts, entertainment, and moderate to upscale stores.
- The Skybridge (second floor): There is direct access from Caesars through the skyway over the Boardwalk, allowing shoppers to get to the casino while avoiding the crowded boardwalk. The more upscale shops were located on this level and the design gives the impression of shopping under the stars.
- The Promenade (third floor): The restaurants, bars, and clubs have been located on the north side of this level of the mall. The south side of the mall has a long glass window with Adirondack chairs placed in sand to give shoppers a place to relax and feel like they are at the beach.
- One Atlantic (Fourth Floor): One Atlantic is a 14,000-square-foot (1,300 m^{2}) events venue and banquet hall on the fourth floor for weddings and parties.

==== Fountain ====
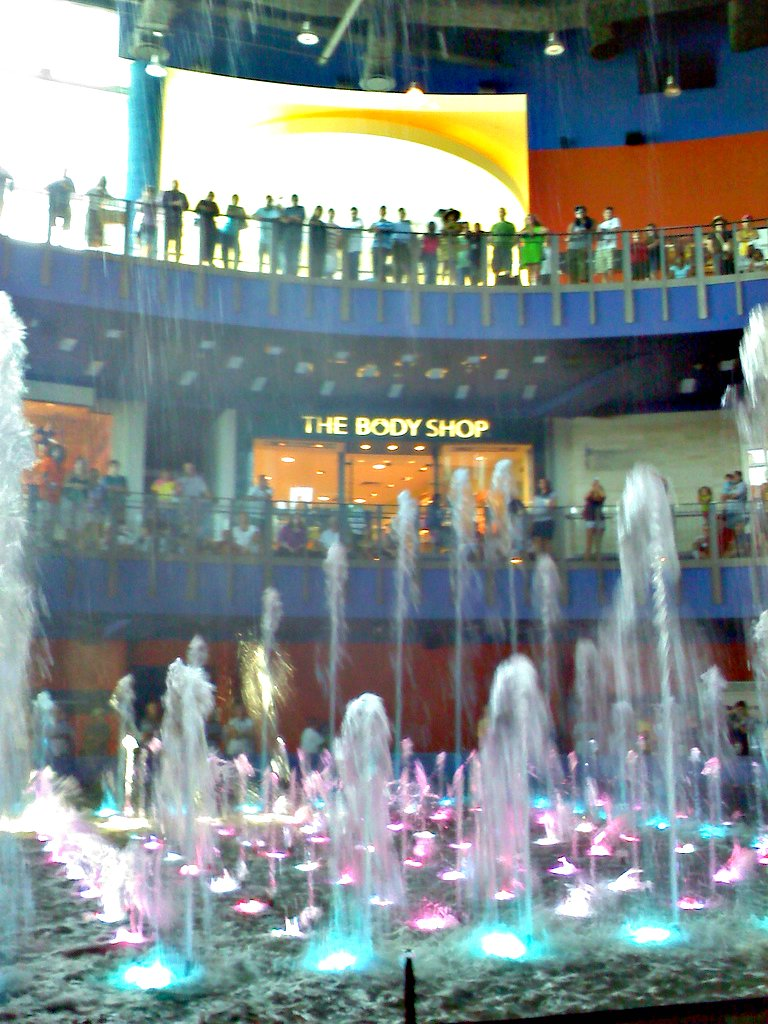
The fountain

"The Show" was the world's largest indoor water fountain display in a shopping mall. The fountain was choreographed and set to music. The show was performed on the hour and had two variations: a day show and a night show. The show was routinely met with applause from audiences and the most popular viewing spot was usually from the mall's second floor. "The Show" was conceptualized, designed and produced by Thinkwell Group.

As of March 2015, the fountains were covered by flooring and the show was no longer taking place.

== See also ==
- Atlantic City Boardwalk
- Warner Theatre (Atlantic City)
- North to Shore Festival
- The Orange Loop
- Caesars Atlantic City
- Netflix Fort Monmouth
- New Jersey Motion Picture and Television Commission
- America's first motion picture industry
- Television and film in New Jersey
