= Mirko Milićević =

Serbian-Turkish basketball player

Mirko Milićević Мирко Милићевић
Personal information
- Born: 2 August 1965 (age 61) Novi Sad, SR Serbia, SFR Yugoslavia
- Listed height: 2.10 m (6 ft 11 in)
- Listed weight: 130 kg (287 lb)

Career information
- NBA draft: 1987: undrafted
- Playing career: 1982–2005
- Position: Center

Career history
- 1982–1988: Crvena zvezda
- 1988–1990: Cibona
- 1991–1992: Vojvodina
- 1992: Hapoel Jerusalem
- 1992–1993: Valladolid
- 1993–1994: Napoli Basket
- 1994–1995: AEK
- 1995–1996: Apollon Patras
- 1996–1999: Türk Telekom
- 1999–2000: Pınar Karşıyaka
- 2000–2001: Büyük Kolej
- 2001–2002: Türk Telekom
- 2002–2003: Göztepe
- 2004–2005: Büyük Kolej

Mirko Milićević (Serbian Cyrillic: Мирко Милићевић; born August 2, 1965) is a Serbian-Turkish retired professional basketball player. He holds Turkish citizenship, under the name of Muhammet Onar.

== Personal life ==
His son, Yesukan Onar, is also a basketball player.
