= Lavelle Felton =

American basketball player (1979–2009)

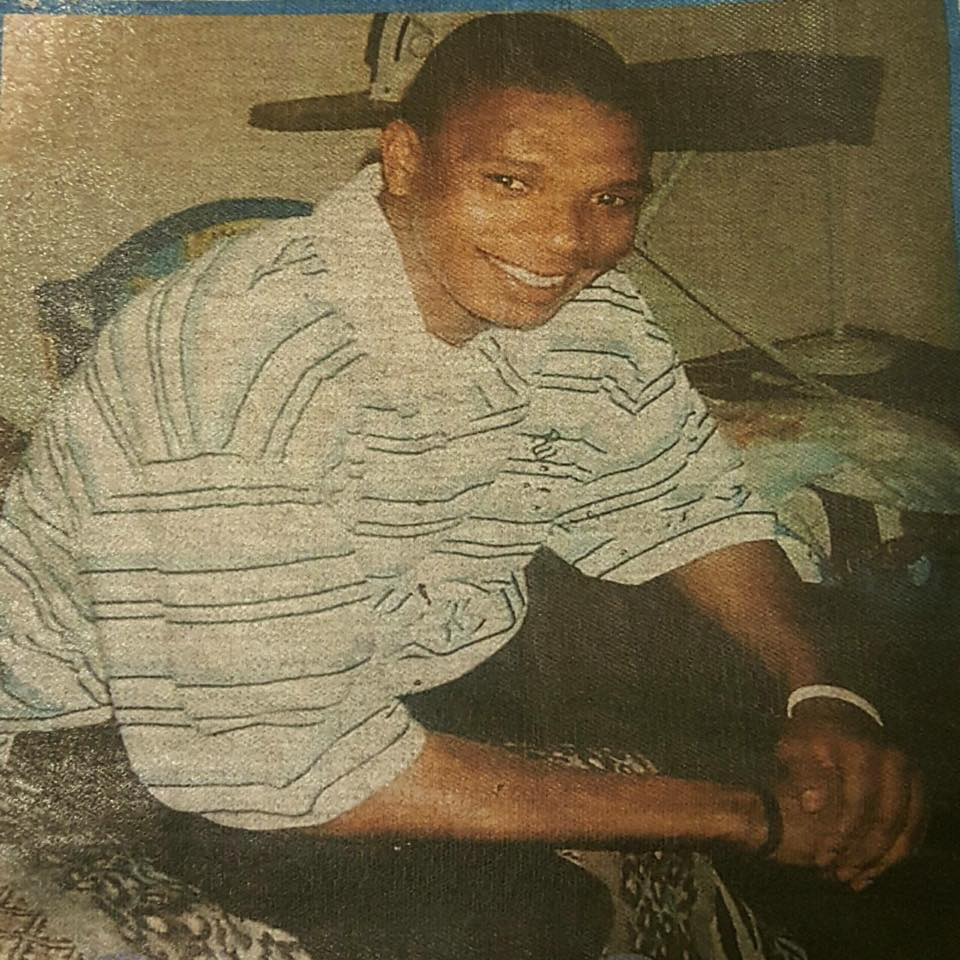
- Felton in an undated photo

Personal information
- Born: October 5, 1979 Milwaukee, Wisconsin
- Died: August 13, 2009 (aged 29) Milwaukee, Wisconsin
- Listed height: 6 ft 4 in (1.93 m)

Career information
- High school: Madison (Milwaukee, Wisconsin)
- College: Chipola JC (1999–2001); Louisiana Tech (2001–2003)
- NBA draft: 2003: undrafted
- Playing career: 2003–2009
- Position: Guard

Career history
- 2003–2005: Büyük Kolej
- 2005–2006: Iraklis Thessaloniki
- 2006: ASVEL Villeurbanne
- 2006–2007: AEK Athens
- 2007–2008: Science City Jena
- 2008–2009: Paderborn Baskets

Lavelle R Felton (October 5, 1979 – August 13, 2009) was an American professional basketball player. In 2009, he was killed in an unsolved shooting.

== Amateur career ==
Nicknamed "Velle" or "Romie", he had played in Madison High School in Milwaukee and then played college basketball with the Louisiana Tech University's Bulldogs where he averaged 13.7 points and 5.1 rebounds a game in 2002–03.

== Professional career ==
He started his professional basketball career in the Turkish Basketball League's Büyük Kolej for two years, before moving on to Greece and France and finally landing in Germany playing for Paderborn Baskets club in the German Basketball Bundesliga. Averaging 10.5 points and 3.1 rebounds per game in the 2008-09 season, Felton helped the club successfully reach the playoffs.

== Death and involvement ==
On August 12, 2009, Felton was seriously wounded by an unknown gunman while in the driver seat of his car, about to depart from a Milwaukee gas station around 2 A.M. local time. Felton died of his wounds one day later. He was survived by a five-year-old stepson, a four-year-old son, and a two-year-old daughter with his girlfriend. Two months later, another former high school basketball player, 22 year-old Querronaceosam "Querro" Evans, was killed at the same gas station.

== See also ==
- List of basketball players who died during their careers
- List of unsolved murders (2000–present)
