= Tauras Stumbrys =

Lithuanian basketball player

Personal information
- Born: 8 January 1970 Kaunas, Lithuanian SSR, Soviet Union
- Died: 16 October 2004 (aged 34) Kaunas, Lithuania
- Listed height: 1.92 m (6 ft 4 in)
- Listed weight: 90 kg (198 lb)

Career information
- Playing career: 1989–2004
- Position: Point guard

Career history
- 1989–1998: Žalgiris Kaunas
- 1998–1999: Atomerőmű SE
- 1999–2000: Žalgiris Kaunas
- 2000: Spartak Saint Petersburg
- 2000–2001: Hapoel Zefat
- 2001: Hapoel Haifa
- 2001: Karlsruhe
- 2001–2002: Unia Tarnów
- 2002–2003: S.C. Lusitânia
- 2003: Topo Centras–Atletas Kaunas
- 2003–2004: Aukštaitija Panevėžys
- 2004: Hidruva–Atletas Kaunas

Career highlights
- LKF Cup champion (1990); 3x Lithuanian Basketball Championship (1991-1993); 5× LKL champion (1994–1998)

Tauras Stumbrys (8 January 1970 – 16 October 2004) was a Lithuanian professional basketball player. He played the point guard position and was a longtime member of Žalgiris Kaunas. With Žalgiris he won the Lithuanian Basketball League five times.

== Death ==
During a Hidruva-Atletas and Žalgiris LKL matchup in October 2004, Stumbrys suffered a myocardial infarction and lost consciousness. Paramedics and teammates attempted to revive him, but to no avail. He was pronounced dead later that night. Stumbrys had played 8 minutes and scored 3 points in his last match.

== See also ==
- List of basketball players who died during their careers
