= Büyük Kolej B.K. =

Büyük Kolej
- Leagues: Turkish Super League
- Founded: 1987
- Dissolved: 2006
- History: Büyük Kolej (1987-2006)
- Arena: Ankara Atatürk Sport Hall
- Location: Ankara, Turkey
- Team colors: Navy, White
- Head coach: Naci Özonay
| Home | Away |

Büyük Kolej is a defunct basketball club based in Ankara, Turkey that played in the Turkish Basketball League. Their home arena was Ankara Atatürk Sport Hall.

== Notable players ==
- (Turkey) Adem Ören (2001–2004)
- (Turkey) Caner Topaloğlu (2005–2006)
- (Turkey) Murat Kaya (2000–2006)
- (Serbia) / (Turkey) Mirko Milićević (2000–2001)&(2004-2005)
- (United States) K'zell Wesson (2000–2001)
- (United States) Lavelle Felton (2003–2005)
- (United States) Ricardo Marsh (2003–2004)
