= Adem Ören =

Turkish basketball player (born 1979)

Personal information
- Born: 8 November 1979 (age 47) Amasya, Turkey
- Listed height: 6 ft 9.5 in (2.07 m)
- Listed weight: 235 lb (107 kg)

Career information
- Playing career: 1997–2020
- Position: Power forward, center

Career history
- 1997–2000: Pınar Karşıyaka
- 2000–2004: Büyük Kolej
- 2004–2006: Türk Telekom
- 2006–2007: Tofaş
- 2007–2008: Türk Telekom
- 2008–2010: Beşiktaş Cola Turka
- 2010–2011: Türk Telekom
- 2011–2012: Beşiktaş
- 2013–2014: Darüşşafaka

Career highlights
- TBL Champion (2012); Turkish Cup Champion (2012); FIBA EuroChallenge Champion (2012)

Adem Ören (born 8 November 1979 in Amasya, Turkey) is a Turkish professional basketball player. He currently plays for Darüşşafaka S.K.
