= Florian Louart =

French basketball player (2003–2025)

Personal information
- Born: 6 January 2003 Violaines, France
- Died: 3 December 2025 (aged 22) Amiens, France
- Listed height: 212 cm (6 ft 11 in)

Career information
- High school: INSEP (Paris, France); Lycée du Noordover (Grande-Synthe, France)
- Playing career: 2018–2024
- Position: Center

Career history
- 2018–2021: Centre Fédéral
- 2022: BCM Gravelines-Dunkerque

Florian Aimé Aristide Louart (6 January 2003 – 3 December 2025) was a French professional basketball player. He was a prospect in the development program of BCM Gravelines-Dunkerque until his career ended prematurely in 2024 due to recurring knee injuries. Louart died of a heart attack one year after his retirement.

== Basketball career ==
Louart was raised in Violaines and played basketball while growing up because of his height. He joined BCM Gravelines-Dunkerque in 2016 and played on their youth team. Louart enrolled at the national training center INSEP in 2018 and played for their Pôle France team from 2018 to 2021.

Louart returned to the youth development program at Gravelines-Dunkerque in 2021 and attended Lycée du Noordover where he obtained his baccalauréat. Louart occasionally trained with the Gravelines-Dunkerque professional team. On May 17, 2022, he played two minutes for them during a game against Orléans Loiret Basket in the LNB Élite. Louart retired after the 2023–24 season due to recurring knee injuries.

== Death ==
On 3 December 2025, Louart died of a heart attack in Amiens at the age of 22. He was working as a customer adviser for Crédit Agricole at the time of his death. Louart was buried in his family's plot at the Douvrin Nord cemetery.
