= Lancaster Armory =

- U.S. National Register of Historic Places
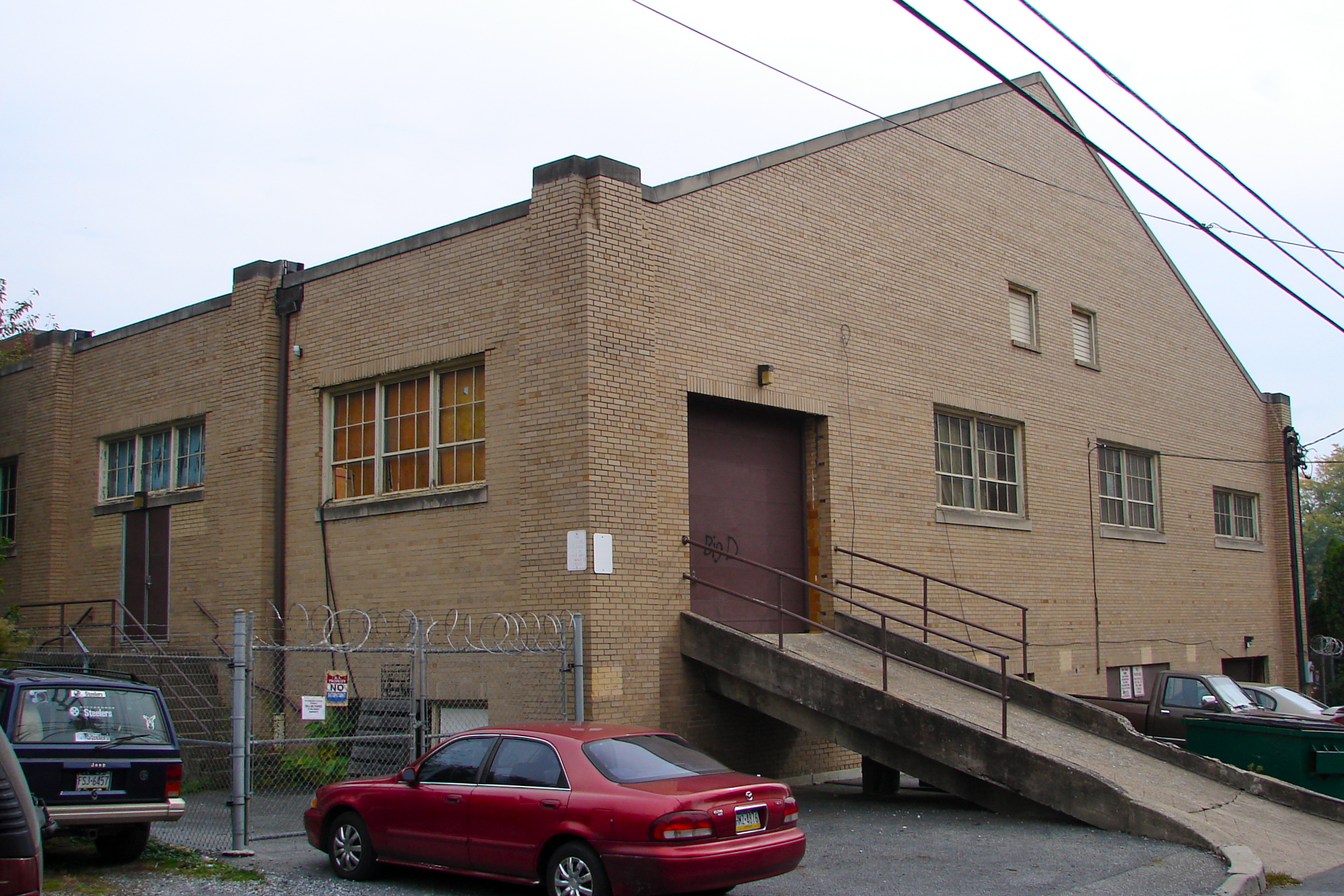
- Lancaster Armory Drill Hall, October 2010

- Location within Pennsylvania Location within the United States
- Location: 438 N. Queen St., Lancaster, Pennsylvania
- Coordinates: 40°2′41″N 76°18′28″W
- Area: 0.6 acres (0.24 ha)
- Built: 1928, 1937
- Architect: Johnson, Philip H.
- Architectural style: Colonial Revival
- MPS: Pennsylvania National Guard Armories MPS
- NRHP reference No.: 91001699
- Added to NRHP: November 14, 1991

The Lancaster Armory, also known as the Brigadier General Charles P. Stahr Armory, is an historic National Guard armory that is located in Lancaster, Lancaster County, Pennsylvania.

It was added to the National Register of Historic Places in 1991.

== History and architectural features ==
This historic structure is a T-shaped brick building consisting of a three-story administration building that was erected in 1937, with a 1 1/2-story drill hall that was built in 1928 and executed in the Colonial Revival style. It measures approximately ninety feet by two hundred feet.

This building, which once played host to the Lancaster Red Roses, was firebombed in 1982.

Used as a public venue under the name The Stahr Center, it was renovated in 2018 and now houses Decades, a boutique bowling alley and retro-arcade.
