= Bill Zubic =

American basketball player (born 1918)

Personal information
- Born: August 7, 1918 Philadelphia, Pennsylvania, U.S.
- Died: July 24, 1994 (aged 75)
- Listed height: 6 ft 5 in (1.96 m)
- Listed weight: 205 lb (93 kg)

Career information
- High school: South Catholic (Philadelphia, Pennsylvania)
- Playing career: 1937–1952

Career history
- 1937–1938: Conshohocken
- 1937–1942: Reading Keys / Republicans
- 1938–1939: Hazelton Mountaineers
- 1939–1940: Elmira (Colonials?)
- 1941–1943: Trenton Tigers
- 1946–1947: Reading Keys
- 1947–1951: Lancaster (Red) Roses / Rockets
- 1948–1949: Atlantic City Tides
- 1951–1952: Pottsville Packers

Career highlights
- EPBL Most Valuable Player (1950); 2× First-team All-EPBL (1950, 1951)

William Bezubic (August 7, 1918 - July 24, 1994), known as Bill Zubic, was an American former professional basketball player.

Zubic was a star at South Catholic High School in Philadelphia, Pennsylvania, and began playing professionally in 1937 at the age of 19. He split the 1937–38 season with Conshohocken of the NL and Reading of the TCL. Zubic stayed with Reading until 1942 while doing stints with Hazelton of the NYPA and Elmira of the NYSL. He joined the Trenton Tigers of the American Basketball League (ABL) during the 1941–42 season.

Zubic's career was interrupted by his service in World War II from 1943, where he achieved the rank of corporal. He returned to playing professionally in the EPBL with Reading. Zubic joined the Lancaster Red Roses in 1947. He was named as the EPBL Most Valuable Player and led the league in scoring with 602 points during the 1949–50 season. He was an All-EPBL First Team selection in 1950 and 1951. Zubic finished his career with a one-game stint with the Pottsville Packers in the 1951–52 season.
