= Lancaster Red Roses (basketball) =

- Leagues: EPBL (1946–49, 1953–55); ABL (1947); EBA (1975–78); CBA (1978–80)
- Founded: 1946
- Folded: 1980
- History: Lancaster Red Roses; 1978-1980; Philadelphia Kings; 1980-1981; Lancaster Lightning; 1981-1985; Baltimore Lightning; 1985-1986; Rockford Lightning; 1986-2006
- Arena: Lancaster Armory
- Location: Lancaster, Pennsylvania
- Team colors: red, blue, white
- Division titles: several

The Lancaster Red Roses were a professional basketball team based in Lancaster, Pennsylvania. From 1946 to 1949 and from 1953 to 1955, they played in the Eastern Professional Basketball League, of which the Red Roses were one of the six original teams. The Red Roses also played briefly as the Lancaster Rockets from 1949 until 1953. They were members of the Eastern Basketball Association from 1975 to 1978, and the Continental Basketball Association from 1979 to 1980. The Red Roses were members of the American Basketball League briefly in the 1946-47 season, where they were known as the Lancaster Roses.

== History ==
Even though the Lancaster Red Roses never won the EPBL championship, they drew many fans to the Lancaster Armory, their home court. Stan "Whitey" Von Neida, who set a league record with 46 points in one game and nearly 700 points scored in a 30-game season, was the main draw for many Lancaster fans. Von Neida lead the Red Roses to the President's Cup finals, and a big three-game series against the Wilkes-Barre Barons.

The Lancaster Red Roses had a perfect 15-0 record at the Lancaster Armory (it would take another 40 years before another EPBL team, the 1990–91 Albany Patroons, would go undefeated at home during the regular season), the team had to move their post-season games to J. P. McCaskey High School because the Lancaster Armory's bleachers were scheduled for removal following Franklin & Marshall College's winter sports season. Although McCaskey High was a bigger venue than the Lancaster Armory, the Roses played the regular season at the Armory because the School District of Lancaster did not allow Sunday professional games to be played in its facilities.

Lancaster and Wilkes-Barre met for the inaugural "President's Cup" finals, but there was a dispute over where the games would be played. In the semifinals, each competing team flipped a coin to determine who would host the decisive third game. Both Lancaster and Wilkes-Barre arrived to the finals on the momentum of 2-0 playoff sweeps, but because both teams were fiercely devoted to their home field advantages, neither team would agree to play a decisive game on the opponent's home court. The final game of the President's Cup was played on a neutral court, Rockne Hall in Allentown, which the Red Roses lost.

After the 1946-47 season, both the Lancaster Red Roses and the Wilkes-Barre Barons left the EPBL, joining the rivaling American Basketball League. After losing five of their first six games in the ABL, the Red Roses rejoined the Eastern League for a 28-game season. Although the team retained most of its original ABL roster, they were without Whitey Von Nieda, who joined the Tri-Cities Blackhawks of the National Basketball League (which later become the National Basketball Association).

The Red Roses' third season was a disaster. The team started league play about two weeks after the rest of the teams had their home openers, and stumbled through a 2-3 record in their first five games. After missing a scheduled road game to Williamsport, the Roses were suspended from play by EPBL President William Morgan, ruling that the Roses did not make a viable effort to get to Williamsport for the game. After Lancaster owner Rothermel Wise and business manager Benny Volk explained they could not make the trip due to hazardous road conditions, Lancaster was restored to the EPBL. A few days later, the Red Roses filed for bankruptcy, claiming liabilities of $3,824.05 and assets of $548.15. Immediately the Red Roses franchise was terminated from the league, with a new entity, the Lancaster Rockets, assuming the rest of the Red Roses' scheduled dates. The Lancaster Rockets would operate in the place of the Red Roses from 1948 following the original Red Roses' bankruptcy until 1953 when the Red Roses returned to operations to take the place of the Rockets.

The Continental Basketball Association also hosted the Lancaster Lightning from 1981-1985. After the 1985 season, the Lightning moved to Baltimore and eventually to Rockford, Illinois where they became the Rockford Lightning.
