= 1949–50 Wilkes-Barre Barons season =

American Basketball League season

- League: American Basketball League (revived original)
- Head coach: Eddie White, Sr. (7–1); Steve Chanecka (0–2); Eddie White, Sr. (14–14)
- General manager: Eddie White, Sr.
- Owner(s): Eddie White, Sr.
- Arena: Ninth Infantry Regiment Armory

Results
- Record: 21–17 (.553)
- Place: Conference: T–3rd
- Playoff finish: Lost ABL semifinals 2–1 to the Scranton Miners

The 1949–50 Wilkes-Barre Barons season was the twelfth professional basketball season played by the Wilkes-Barre Barons franchise while they were competing in the revived version of the American Basketball League. This would also be their fifth season competing in the revived version of the ABL after previously competing in the Pennsylvania State Basketball League and then briefly competing in the Eastern Basketball League before later going on a long hiatus (potentially as an independent team) before returning to the ABL from 1938 until 1940 and then eventually returning to the Eastern Pennsylvania Basketball League for its inaugural 1946–47 season before returning to the ABL once again from 1947 onward. Once again, the Barons would look to repeat as champions in the league (especially with an unprecedented four straight championships when including the inaugural season championship from the EPBL) while competing as one of eight teams within the revived (yet weakened up) version of the ABL, though the number of teams would decrease down to six teams by the end of the season. Unlike the team's previous championship seasons, Wilkes-Barre would show their first signs of weakness by team owner and head coach Eddie White, Sr. leaving his coaching position after a promising 7–1 record for player-coach Steve Chanecka, though White would later return for the rest of the season after two lost games there. The off-kilter coaching change would lead to the Barons having a more average performance throughout the rest of the season not long after, as they'd finish the season with an above-average 21–17 record to tie up with the newly-added (all-black) New York / Saratoga Harlem Yankees for a third place finish behind the Bridgeport Aer-A-Sols and the Scranton Miners. While Wilkes-Barre would not get the best record for the fourth straight season in a row, they would once again qualify for the ABL Playoffs, though they'd be the underdogs this time around against the #1 seeded Scranton Miners due to them still performing a lot better throughout the season in an overall manner than the Harlem Yankees in spite of their later struggles in the season. After Scranton and Wilkes-Barre split the first two games, the Miners would win a tense triple-overtime thriller with a 103–99 final score to not only eliminate the Barons from contention (thus denying Wilkes-Barre their fourth straight championship (third in the ABL alone)), but also gain the ABL's championship not long afterward over Bridgeport.

== Roster ==
Due to information on American Basketball League players being generally hard to find (especially by the time the ABL was designated more as a minor league during its later years of existence), there are bound to be more gaps and/or inaccuracies found in certain areas on the team's roster spots than usual.

1949–50 Wilkes-Barre Barons roster
Players

Pos.	No.	Player	Height	Weight	DOB	From
G	10	Greek Athas	6 ft 2 in (1.88 m)	180 lb (82 kg)	1922-10-06	Tulane
F/C	10	Herschel Baltimore	6 ft 4 in (1.93 m)	195 lb (88 kg)	1921-06-21	Penn State
F/C		Ike Borsavage	6 ft 8 in (2.03 m)	220 lb (100 kg)	1924-07-25	Temple
F	6, 16	Bill Chanecka	6 ft 4 in (1.93 m)	185 lb (84 kg)	1924-04-21	Binghamton Central HS (NY)
G	5, 17	Steve Chanecka	6 ft 2 in (1.88 m)	205 lb (93 kg)	1918-02-06	Binghamton Central HS (NY)
F	18	Joe Colone	6 ft 5 in (1.96 m)	210 lb (95 kg)	1924-01-23	Bloomsburg
F/C	18	George Glamack	6 ft 6 in (1.98 m)	225 lb (102 kg)	1918-06-07	North Carolina
G		Wes Hamme			Unknown	No college
G	7	Ted Hanauer	6 ft 1 in (1.85 m)		1924-01-01	Huntington College
F	4	Earl Hawkins	6 ft 4 in (1.93 m)	225 lb (102 kg)	1920-09-23	Auburn
F		Ray Kodish			1923-06-10	No college
G	14	Bobby McDermott	5 ft 11 in (1.80 m)	180 lb (82 kg)	1914-01-07	Flushing HS (NY)
C	6	Elmore Morgenthaler	6 ft 9 in (2.06 m)	230 lb (104 kg)	1922-08-03	Boston College
F		Hank O'Keeffe	6 ft 3 in (1.91 m)	195 lb (88 kg)	1923-12-12	Canisius
F	3, 13	Cas Ostrowski	6 ft 2 in (1.88 m)	170 lb (77 kg)	1924-07-24	Scranton
G/F	8	Pete Pasko	6 ft 2 in (1.88 m)	190 lb (86 kg)	1919–09–09	East Stroudsburg State
G/F	9	Milt Ticco	6 ft 3 in (1.91 m)	190 lb (86 kg)	1922-09-22	Kentucky
G/F	15	Marty Zippel	6 ft 3 in (1.91 m)		1922-02-07	Lafayette

Coaches
Head coach

Eddie White, Sr.
Steve Chanecka
Eddie White, Sr.

Legend
- (DP) Unsigned draft pick
- (FA) Free agent
- (S) Suspended
- Injured

Note: It's currently unknown what the team's roster for the ABL Playoffs for this season was. However, it's suggested that the players who had known jersey numbers are suggested to have stayed with the team by the time the ABL Playoffs began.

== American Basketball League Standings ==
Pos.	Team	Wins	Losses	Win %
1	Scranton Miners	27	11	.711
2	Bridgeport Aer-A-Sols	22	13	.629
3	Wilkes-Barre Barons	21	17	.552
4	New York / Saratoga Harlem Yankees*^{[a]}	21	17	.552
5	Paterson Crescents	17	18	.486
6	Hartford Hurricanes	11	26	.297
7	Trenton Tigers / Cohoes Marras**†^{[b]}	4	16	.200
8	Schenectady Packers†^{[c]}	0	4	.000

† – Did not survive the ABL season.
* – The New York Harlem Yankees moved to Saratoga, New York (though they presumably played some of their games in Schenectady, New York) during the season.
** – The Trenton Tigers would end up moving to Cohoes, New York after being without a home venue for a month straight before later folding operations without winning a single game in Cohoes under their new Cohoes Marras name.

== American Basketball League Playoffs ==
=== American Basketball League Semifinals ===
(3) Wilkes-Barre Barons Vs. (1) Scranton Miners: Scranton wins series 2–1

- Game 1: March 19, 1950 @ Scranton: Scranton 60, Wilkes-Barre 49
- Game 2: March 22, 1950 @ Wilkes-Barre: Wilkes-Barre 89, Scranton 83
- Game 3: March 26, 1950 @ Scranton: Scranton 103, Wilkes-Barre 99 (3 OT)

== Notes ==
^{a} The New York Harlem Yankees moved to Saratoga, New York (though they presumably played some of their games in Schenectady, New York) to become the Saratoga Harlem Yankees at some currently unknown point in time during this season.
^{b} The Trenton Tigers would move to Cohoes, New York to become the Cohoes Marras on January 7, 1950 after previously playing as a road team only from December 11-28, 1949 (with their road trip leading to nothing but defeats) before the Trenton Tigers turned Cohoes Marras folded operations by either January 30 or February 1, 1950.
^{c} The Schenectady Packers would end up dropping out of the ABL on November 23, 1949.
