= 1950–51 Wilkes-Barre Barons season =

American Basketball League season

- League: American Basketball League (revived original)
- Head coach: Eddie White, Sr. (22–10); Marty Zippel (1–0); Shag Hawkins (5–1)
- General manager: Eddie White, Sr.
- Owner(s): Eddie White, Sr.
- Arena: Ninth Infantry Regiment Armory

Results
- Record: 28–11 (.718)
- Place: Conference: N/A (Technically 2nd)
- Playoff finish: Withdrew from the ABL near the end of the season on February 22, 1951 despite their record due to the defending champion Scranton Miners wanting a $1,500 bond demand from Wilkes-Barre.

The 1950–51 Wilkes-Barre Barons season was the thirteenth professional basketball season played by the Wilkes-Barre Barons franchise while they were competing in the revived version of the American Basketball League. This would also be their sixth season competing in the revived version of the ABL after previously competing in the Pennsylvania State Basketball League and then briefly competing in the Eastern Basketball League before later going on a long hiatus (potentially as an independent team) before returning to the ABL from 1938 until 1940 and then eventually returning to the Eastern Pennsylvania Basketball League for its inaugural 1946–47 season before returning to the ABL once again from 1947 onward. Entering this season, the Barons would look to regain the ABL's championship over the Scranton Miners, with them both being among the now-seven competing teams within the (currently struggling) league by this point in time. Throughout most of the season, Wilkes-Barre looked poised to be the team that was ready to take down the defending champions, as the Barons would put up a 28–11 record that only placed them behind the Miners this season due to the scoring prowess of Johnny Ezersky this time around. However, near the end of the regular season, on February 22, 1951, the Wilkes-Barre Barons would surprisingly leave the ABL due to the defending champion Scranton Miners asking for a $1,500 bond from team owner Eddie White, Sr. before playing their upcoming match that night; this would cause a wild chain reaction that would end up affecting how the rest of the ABL's season would play out. Following the cancellation of their match against Scranton on March 4, the ABL would try to get their playoffs to work out with the Utica Pros (who originally were the #5 seed with a 17–22 record) being the new #4 seed and the original #4 and #3 seeds of the season (the Bridgeport Aer-A-Sols and the Paterson Crescents) being the new #3 and #2 seeds respectively instead. However, a combination of the Utica Pros not wanting to go up against the Scranton Miners in the semifinal round and both Bridgeport and Paterson having trouble securing armories to play their home games in the ABL Playoffs led to the league being forced to cancel the playoffs this season entirely, with the Miners repeating as champions in the process there. Despite the Barons deciding to leave due to the bond demand from Scranton, Wilkes-Barre would end up deciding to return to the ABL either because the demand was ultimately paid to the now two-time champions or because the bond demand would be forgiven for some unknown reason.

== Roster ==
Due to information on American Basketball League players being generally hard to find (especially by the time the ABL was designated more as a minor league during its later years of existence), there are bound to be more gaps and/or inaccuracies found in certain areas on the team's roster spots than usual.

1950–51 Wilkes-Barre Barons roster
Players

Pos.	No.	Player	Height	Weight	DOB	From
F		Edward Bartels	6 ft 5 in (1.96 m)	195 lb (88 kg)	1925-10-08	NC State
F	3, 6	Bill Chanecka	6 ft 4 in (1.93 m)	185 lb (84 kg)	1924-04-21	Binghamton Central HS (NY)
G	17, 19	Steve Chanecka	6 ft 2 in (1.88 m)	205 lb (93 kg)	1918-02-06	Binghamton Central HS (NY)
F	7	Joe Colone	6 ft 5 in (1.96 m)	210 lb (95 kg)	1924-01-23	Bloomsburg
G	4	Chink Crossin	6 ft 1 in (1.85 m)	165 lb (75 kg)	1924-07-04	Penn
G		Harry Donovan	6 ft 2 in (1.88 m)	180 lb (82 kg)	1926-09-10	Muhlenberg
C	5	Ray Ellefson	6 ft 8 in (2.03 m)	230 lb (104 kg)	1922-09-18	Oklahoma State
G	12	Bill Erickson	6 ft 1 in (1.85 m)	184 lb (83 kg)	1928-06-08	Illinois
G/F	8, 18	Johnny Ezersky	6 ft 3 in (1.91 m)	175 lb (79 kg)	1922-03-21	Rhode Island
F	10	Earl Hawkins	6 ft 4 in (1.93 m)	225 lb (102 kg)	1920-09-23	Auburn
F	14	Jack Leighton	6 ft 2 in (1.88 m)		1928-01-25	Scranton
C		Johnny Ludka	6 ft 11 in (2.11 m)	225 lb (102 kg)	1926-01-28	Syracuse
F	7	Ariel Maughan	6 ft 4 in (1.93 m)	190 lb (86 kg)	1923-04-23	Utah State
F/C	17	Bob O'Brien	6 ft 4 in (1.93 m)	190 lb (86 kg)	1927-01-26	Pepperdine
F/C		Claude Overton	6 ft 2 in (1.88 m)	195 lb (88 kg)	1927-12-16	East Central
F/C		Jack Shelton	6 ft 7 in (2.01 m)	210 lb (95 kg)	1928-08-07	Oklahoma State
G/F	9	Milt Ticco	6 ft 3 in (1.91 m)	190 lb (86 kg)	1922-09-22	Kentucky
G/F		Butch van Breda Kolff	6 ft 3 in (1.91 m)	185 lb (84 kg)	1922-10-28	NYU
G/F	15	Marty Zippel	6 ft 3 in (1.91 m)		1922-02-07	Lafayette

Coaches
Head coach

Eddie White, Sr.
Marty Zippel
Shag Hawkins

Legend
- (DP) Unsigned draft pick
- (FA) Free agent
- (S) Suspended
- Injured

Note: In addition to (apparently) having all of these players around on their team, guard/forward Frank Pozda would join the team for non-ABL scheduled games only in this season.

== American Basketball League Standings ==
Pos.	Team	Wins	Losses	Win %
1	Scranton Miners	28	8	.778
2	Wilkes-Barre Barons^{×}^{[a]}	28	11	.718
3	Paterson Crescents	21	16	.568
4	Bridgeport Aer-A-Sols	18	15	.545
5	Utica Pros^{[b]}	17	22	.436
6	Saratoga Harlem Yankees	5	25	.167
7	Allentown / Carbondale Aces^{[c]}	4	24	.105

× – Withdrew from the ABL this season on February 22, 1951 following a $1,500 bond demand from the Scranton Miners.
* – The Allentown Aces moved from Allentown, Pennsylvania to nearby Carbondale, Pennsylvania during the season on December 28, 1950 following a 1–12 start to their season.

== Aborted American Basketball League Playoffs ==
Originally, the ABL intended to have a proper playoff series occur with the best four teams in the league competing against each other in something similar to what the formerly rivaling National Basketball League had done in certain seasons without divisions at hand where the best four teams of the season would compete against each other (in this case, had the Wilkes-Barre Barons not left the ABL left in the season, it would have had the defending ABL champion Scranton Miners competing against the recently rebranded Bridgeport Aer-A-Sols and the Wilkes-Barre Barons would have competed against the Paterson Crescents for this season). However, because Wilkes-Barre unexpectedly withdrew from the ABL late in the season on February 22, 1951 due to a $1,500 bond demand from Scranton themselves (as noted by the Barons' planned season finale on March 4, 1951 against the Scranton Miners in Scranton being cancelled), the planned ABL playoffs had Scranton going up against the new Utica Pros expansion team (who took on the fourth place spot in the ABL officially for this season) and the Paterson Crescents would go up against the Bridgeport Aer-A-Sols as the new #2 Vs. #3 seeded match-up. However, before the ABL playoffs were planned to begin, Utica voted to not participate in the planned (alternative) playoff set-up against Scranton; that surprising vote combined with the lack of armories for teams to compete in during a planned playoff tournament for the ABL (specifically for both Bridgeport and Paterson) led to the league scrapping the ABL playoffs entirely this time around (which would be somewhat similar to what happened in their 1941–42 season), with the Scranton Miners being crowned the two-time champions of the ABL following this decision. This failure by the ABL's hands would help further lead to the ABL's decline and then conclusion that happened in the 1950s decade, as well as help lead to the Paterson Crescents leaving the ABL by the end of this season alongside the aforementioned Utica Pros, though it's suggested that the Utica Pros would become the Elmira Colonels instead.

== Awards and honors ==
By the end of the season, despite the Wilkes-Barre Barons abruptly leaving the season in a very premature manner, Johnny Ezersky would end up being the leading scorer of the entire league for the eighteenth season of its return and its 24th overall season of its existence with 718 points scored for an average of 18.4 points per game in 39 games played right before Wilkes-Barre left the ABL near the end of the regular season due to a $1,500 bond demand from the Scranton Miners.

== Notes ==
^{a} The Wilkes-Barre Barons withdrew from the ABL this season on February 22, 1951 (a fair amount of time before the planned ABL playoffs were meant to begin) following a $1,500 bond demand from the Scranton Miners.
^{b} The Utica Pros were named the replacement team to enter what would have been the 1951 ABL Playoffs had they been able to begin properly, with Utica being the (new) #4 seed for the season while the Bridgeport Aer-A-Sols were named the new #3 seed instead of being the #4 seed and the Paterson Crescents were named the new #2 seed instead of being the #3 seed for this season.
^{c} The Allentown Aces moved from Allentown, Pennsylvania to nearby Carbondale, Pennsylvania during the season on December 28, 1950 following a 1–12 start to their season to become the Carbondale Aces for the rest of the season.
