= 1948–49 Wilkes-Barre Barons season =

American Basketball League season

- League champions
- Conference champions
- League: American Basketball League (revived original)
- Head coach: Eddie White, Sr.
- General manager: Eddie White, Sr.
- Owner(s): Eddie White, Sr.
- Arena: Ninth Infantry Regiment Armory

Results
- Record: 29–12 (.707)
- Place: Conference: 1st
- Playoff finish: Won ABL championship 3-2 over the Scranton Miners

The 1948–49 Wilkes-Barre Barons season was the eleventh professional basketball season played by the Wilkes-Barre Barons franchise while they were competing in the revived version of the American Basketball League. This would also be their fourth season competing in the revived version of the ABL after previously competing in the Pennsylvania State Basketball League and then briefly competing in the Eastern Basketball League before later going on a long hiatus (potentially as an independent team) before returning to the ABL from 1938 until 1940 and then eventually returning to the Eastern Pennsylvania Basketball League for its inaugural 1946–47 season before returning to the ABL once again from 1947 onward. Entering this season, Wilkes-Barre would look to repeat as champions while competing as one of eight teams within the revived (yet weakened up) version of the ABL. Once again, the Barons would lead the entire league with an above-average 29–12 record for a first place finish, where they would again go up against the #3 seeded Trenton Tigers in the semifinal round. After sweeping the Tigers 2–0, Wilkes-Barre would go up against the #2 seeded Scranton Miners, who would make it a bigger challenge for the Barons with a 2–1 deficit at first before the Wilkes-Barre Barons ended up winning the last two games of the series to repeat as ABL champions (and be three-time champions when including their inaugural EPBL championship) with a 3–2 series victory. Following the season's conclusion, there would be talks about the Barons leaving the ABL to move into the rivaling National Basketball League, but due in part to the NBL merging with the also-rivaling Basketball Association of America to become the National Basketball Association, Wilkes-Barre would ultimately stay with the ABL for another season instead.

== Roster ==
Due to information on American Basketball League players being generally hard to find (especially by the time the ABL was designated more as a minor league during its later years of existence), there are bound to be more gaps and/or inaccuracies found in certain areas on the team's roster spots than usual.

1948–49 Wilkes-Barre Barons roster
Players

Pos.	No.	Player	Height	Weight	DOB	From
F/C	4, 10	Herschel Baltimore	6 ft 4 in (1.93 m)	195 lb (88 kg)	1921-06-21	Penn State
F/C		John Barr	6 ft 3 in (1.91 m)	205 lb (93 kg)	1918-08-08	Penn State
F	6, 58	Bill Chanecka	6 ft 4 in (1.93 m)	185 lb (84 kg)	1924-04-21	Binghamton Central HS (NY)
G	5	Steve Chanecka	6 ft 2 in (1.88 m)	205 lb (93 kg)	1918-02-06	Binghamton Central HS (NY)
G	12	Chick Craig	6 ft 1 in (1.85 m)	180 lb (82 kg)	1922-07-23	Long Island
G	4	John Gozdenovich	6 ft 3 in (1.91 m)		1924-03-08	Long Island
G	7	Ted Hanauer	6 ft 1 in (1.85 m)		1924-01-01	Huntington College
F	4, 14	Earl Hawkins	6 ft 4 in (1.93 m)	225 lb (102 kg)	1920-09-23	Auburn
	14, 15	Verl Heap			1924-09-06	Arizona State
G		Darrell Lorance	6 ft 2 in (1.88 m)	195 lb (88 kg)	1928-02-28	Missouri
F	3	Cas Ostrowski	6 ft 2 in (1.88 m)	170 lb (77 kg)	1924-07-24	Scranton
G/F	8	Pete Pasko	6 ft 2 in (1.88 m)	190 lb (86 kg)	1919–09–09	East Stroudsburg State
C		John Phoenix	6 ft 9 in (2.06 m)		1924-04-02	Idaho
G/F	9	Milt Ticco	6 ft 3 in (1.91 m)	190 lb (86 kg)	1922-09-22	Kentucky

Coaches
Head coach

Eddie White, Sr.

Legend
- (DP) Unsigned draft pick
- (FA) Free agent
- (S) Suspended
- Injured

Note: It's currently unknown what the team's roster for the ABL Playoffs for this season was. However, it's suggested that the players who had known jersey numbers are suggested to have stayed with the team by the time the ABL Playoffs began.

== American Basketball League Standings ==
Pos.	Team	Wins	Losses	Win %
1	Wilkes-Barre Barons	29	12	.707
2	Scranton Miners	26	15	.634
3	Trenton Tigers	25	16	.610
T–4	Paterson Crescents	24	17	.585
T–4	Bridgeport Newfield Steelers	24	17	.585
6	Hartford Hurricanes / Caps	13	26	.333
7	Brooklyn Gothams	10	30	.250
8	Atlantic City Tides / Philadelphia SPHAs^{[a]}	8	26	.235

The Paterson Crescents would defeat the Bridgeport Newfield Steelers 99–80 on March 26, 1949 in the fourth place tiebreaker match for the season, which would ensure their qualification for the 1949 ABL Playoffs for this season.

== American Basketball League Playoffs ==
=== American Basketball League Semifinals ===
(1) Wilkes-Barre Barons Vs. (3) Trenton Tigers: Wilkes-Barre wins series 2–0

- Game 1: March 30, 1949 @ Wilkes-Barre: Wilkes-Barre 106, Trenton 71
- Game 2: April 3, 1949 @ Trenton: Wilkes-Barre 93, Trenton 80

=== American Basketball League Championship Round ===
(1) Wilkes-Barre Barons Vs. (2) Scranton Miners: Wilkes-Barre wins series 3–2

- Game 1: April 7, 1949 @ Wilkes-Barre: Wilkes-Barre 71, Scranton 60
- Game 2: April 10, 1949 @ Scranton: Scranton 75, Wilkes-Barre 70
- Game 3: April 12, 1949 @ Wilkes-Barre: Scranton 74, Wilkes-Barre 62
- Game 4: April 20, 1949 @ Scranton: Wilkes-Barre 72, Scranton 56
- Game 5: April 22, 1949 @ Wilkes-Barre: Wilkes-Barre 58, Scranton 47

== Notes ==
^{a} Before this season began, the Philadelphia Sphas moved from Philadelphia, Pennsylvania to Atlantic City, New Jersey to become the Atlantic City Tides in an effort to survive for the long-term. However, after having disappointing attendance results for home games at the Million Dollar Pier in Atlantic City, the team returned to Philadelphia to become the Sphas once again for the rest of the season going forward into their existence on January 16, 1949, with them playing their final home games as a professional basketball team back at their primary home court in the ballroom area of the Broadwood Hotel.
