= 1952–53 Wilkes-Barre Barons season =

American Basketball League season

- League: American Basketball League (revived original)
- Head coach: Eddie White, Sr.
- General manager: Eddie White, Sr.
- Owner(s): Eddie White, Sr.
- Arena: Ninth Infantry Regiment Armory

Results
- Record: 20–11 (.645)
- Place: Conference: 2nd
- Playoff finish: Lost ABL championship 2–0 to the Manchester British-Americans

The 1952–53 Wilkes-Barre Barons season was the fifteenth professional basketball season played by the Wilkes-Barre Barons franchise while they were competing in the revived version of the American Basketball League. This would also be their eighth and final season competing in the revived version of the ABL after previously competing in the Pennsylvania State Basketball League and then briefly competing in the Eastern Basketball League before later going on a long hiatus (potentially as an independent team) before returning to the ABL from 1938 until 1940 and then eventually returning to the Eastern Pennsylvania Basketball League for its inaugural 1946–47 season before returning to the ABL once again from 1947 onward up until this season's conclusion. Entering this season, the Barons would try to repeat as champions of the ABL once again while competing as one of seven teams in the struggling league after seeing the Jersey City Titans leave the league before the season began, though the league would quickly diminish itself down to only five surviving teams by the end of the season. Despite the significant struggles the ABL had to deal with, Wilkes-Barre would be one of the more stable and successful teams remaining in the league with a 20–11 record for a second place finish behind only the Manchester British-Americans. Their second place finish would easily see them qualify for what would be the final ABL Playoffs ever held, with their semifinal match being a rematch against the #3 seeded Elmira Colonels. Wilkes-Barre and Elmira would split the first six games played (with the Barons getting a 3–2 series lead at one point) before winning their decisive Game 7 with a 75–70 victory at home over the Colonels, leaving the Barons with a shot at winning the final ABL championship series ever held against the British-Americans. Unfortunately for Wilkes-Barre, they would quickly get swept 2–0 in the final championship series held in the original ABL's history; following this season's conclusion, multiple factors beyond the league's control (including the Barons having their home venue sell off their local bleachers) would result in the ABL suspending operations for the 1953–54 season before folding their league for good by the time their 1954–55 season was set to begin, with the Barons later moving back to the minor EPBL (now rebranded as the Eastern Professional Basketball League) during the same season the original ABL folded operations for good.

== Roster ==
Due to information on American Basketball League players being generally hard to find (especially by the time the ABL was designated more as a minor league during its later years of existence), there are bound to be more gaps and/or inaccuracies found in certain areas on the team's roster spots than usual.

1952–53 Wilkes-Barre Barons roster
Players

Pos.	No.	Player	Height	Weight	DOB	From
SG	4	Gerald Calabrese	6 ft 1 in (1.85 m)	175 lb (79 kg)	1924-07-04	St. John's
F	6, 9	Jim Cathcart	6 ft 4 in (1.93 m)	205 lb (93 kg)	1926-11-22	Arkansas
F	14, 19	Joe Colone	6 ft 5 in (1.96 m)	210 lb (95 kg)	1924-01-23	Bloomsburg
G	4	Ray Corley	6 ft 0 in (1.83 m)	180 lb (82 kg)	1928-01-14	Georgetown
G	4?	Chink Crossin	6 ft 1 in (1.85 m)	165 lb (75 kg)	1924-07-04	Penn
F	10, 15	Earl Hawkins	6 ft 4 in (1.93 m)	225 lb (102 kg)	1920-09-23	Auburn
F/C	3	Roger Layne	6 ft 7 in (2.01 m)		1929-02-20	Kentucky
F	16	Chuck Mrazovich	6 ft 5 in (1.96 m)	185 lb (84 kg)	1924-02-26	Eastern Kentucky
		Toby Nagle			Unknown	No college
G	8?	John O'Boyle	6 ft 2 in (1.88 m)	185 lb (84 kg)	1928-03-07	Colorado State
G	7	Kevin O'Shea	6 ft 2 in (1.88 m)	175 lb (79 kg)	1925-07-10	Notre Dame
		Dave Perry			Unknown	No college
F	8	Bob Priddy	6 ft 3 in (1.91 m)	190 lb (86 kg)	1930-03-24	New Mexico State
PG	7, 17	Moe Radovich	6 ft 0 in (1.83 m)	160 lb (73 kg)	1929-05-05	Wyoming
F		Hank Rosenstein	6 ft 4 in (1.93 m)	185 lb (84 kg)	1920-06-16	CCNY
G		Wally Sheil	6 ft 2 in (1.88 m)		1929-04-15	Saint Peter's
G	5, 7	Tom Smith	6 ft 1 in (1.85 m)	165 lb (75 kg)	1926-07-05	Saint Peter's
G		Jimmy Thompson	5 ft 10 in (1.78 m)		1930-12-04	Bloomsburg State
		Gordon Vivian			Unknown	No college
G		Red Wallace	6 ft 1 in (1.85 m)	185 lb (84 kg)	1918-07-12	Scranton
		Jenks Williams			Unknown	No college

Coaches
Head coach

Eddie White, Sr.

Legend
- (DP) Unsigned draft pick
- (FA) Free agent
- (S) Suspended
- Injured

Note: It's currently unknown what the team's roster for the ABL Playoffs for this season was. However, it's suggested that the players who had known jersey numbers are suggested to have stayed with the team by the time the ABL Playoffs began.

== American Basketball League Standings ==
Pos.	Team	Wins	Losses	Win %
1	Manchester British-Americans - z	19	9	.679
2	Wilkes-Barre Barons - x	20	11	.550
3	Elmira Colonels*^{[a]} - x	17	11	.607
4	Scranton Miners*^{[b]} - x	12	11	.522
5	Pawtucket Slaters	6	19	.240
6	Middletown Guards†**^{[c]}	2	5	.286
7	Hazleton / Glen Falls-Saratoga Harlem Yankees†***^{[d]}	1	11	.083

* – Team briefly dropped out of the ABL during the season before returning to the league later on within the season.
** – The Middletown Guards dropped out of the ABL on January 8, 1953 and then disbanded as a franchise two days later on January 10, 1953.
*** – The Hazleton Harlem Yankees started their season out in Hazleton, Pennsylvania before they moved out two games into their season on December 4, 1952 to move back to Saratoga Springs, New York with games also played in Glen Falls, New York to become the Glen Falls-Saratoga Harlem Yankees for the rest of their season up until they ceased operations and withdrew operations on February 6, 1953.
† – Did not survive the ABL season.

== American Basketball League Playoffs ==
=== American Basketball League Semifinals ===
(2) Wilkes-Barre Barons Vs. (3) Elmira Colonels: Wilkes-Barre wins series 4–3

- Game 1: March 10, 1953 @ Wilkes-Barre: Elmira 91, Wilkes-Barre 85
- Game 2: March 12, 1953 @ Elmira: Wilkes-Barre 63, Elmira 56
- Game 3: March 14, 1953 @ Elmira: Elmira 74, Wilkes-Barre 71
- Game 4: March 15, 1953 @ Wilkes-Barre: Wilkes-Barre 90, Elmira 82
- Game 5: March 19, 1953 @ Wilkes-Barre: Wilkes-Barre 89, Elmira 81
- Game 6: March 21, 1953 @ Elmira: Elmira 63, Wilkes-Barre 60
- Game 7: March 22, 1953 @ Wilkes-Barre: Wilkes-Barre 75, Elmira 70

=== American Basketball League Championship Series ===
(2) Wilkes-Barre Barons Vs. (1) Manchester British-Americans: Manchester wins series 2–0

Manchester would end up becoming the final champions of the original American Basketball League's overall history.

== Notes ==
^{a} The Elmira Colonels dropped out of the ABL on October 23, 1952 alongside the Jersey City Titans due to the Colonels having Bill Spivey on their roster at the time (with the Titans having multiple players that were previously a part of the 1951 college basketball point-shaving scandal themselves as well). Initially, the Colonels tried to be an exhibition team for the season, but after a few games, they decided to cut Bill Spivey from their roster in order to return to the ABL and have the league restart their season properly with seven teams playing throughout the season instead of eight teams playing this season.
^{b} The Scranton Miners previously dropped out of the ABL on December 20, 1952 due to original team owner Joe "Speed" Maloney charging other owners with evading the league's minimum guarantee of $300 per game before they reorganized themselves under a new group of management within late December 1952 before returning to the ABL by January 10, 1953, though Scranton would later withdraw operations from the league during the ABL's playoffs (with an impromptu forfeit defeat resulting in the Manchester British-Americans going into the championship round for this season) following a controversial ruling regarding a playoff match held on March 14, 1953.
^{c} The Middletown Guards dropped out of the ABL on January 8, 1953 and then disbanded as a franchise two days later on January 10, 1953.
^{d} The Hazleton Harlem Yankees started their season out in Hazleton, Pennsylvania before they moved out two games into their season on December 4, 1952 to move back to Saratoga Springs, New York with games also played in Glen Falls, New York to become the Glen Falls-Saratoga Harlem Yankees for the rest of their season up until they ceased operations and withdrew operations on February 6, 1953.
