= 1951–52 Wilkes-Barre Barons season =

American Basketball League season

- League champions
- League: American Basketball League (revived original)
- Head coach: Eddie White, Sr.
- General manager: Eddie White, Sr.
- Owner(s): Eddie White, Sr.
- Arena: Ninth Infantry Regiment Armory

Results
- Record: 20–19 (.513)
- Place: Conference: 3rd
- Playoff finish: Won ABL championship 4–2 over the Scranton Miners

The 1951–52 Wilkes-Barre Barons season was the fourteenth professional basketball season played by the Wilkes-Barre Barons franchise while they were competing in the revived version of the American Basketball League. This would also be their seventh season competing in the revived version of the ABL after previously competing in the Pennsylvania State Basketball League and then briefly competing in the Eastern Basketball League before later going on a long hiatus (potentially as an independent team) before returning to the ABL from 1938 until 1940 and then eventually returning to the Eastern Pennsylvania Basketball League for its inaugural 1946–47 season before returning to the ABL once again from 1947 onward. After previously dealing with shenanigans involving a $1,500 bond demand from the now two-time defending champion Scranton Miners, the Barons would decide to return to the ABL and attempt to regain the league's championship in a league that started out with seven (later eight) teams before going down to six teams by the end of the season. Unlike previous seasons played in the ABL, despite having Eddie White, Sr. return to coach full-time with the team, Wilkes-Barre would barely be an above-average team in the regular season with a 20–19 record for a third place finish behind only the Elmira Colonels and the two-time defending ABL champion Scranton Miners (though the Barons would finish the regular season on a strong note due to acquisitions from the Middletown Guards. Despite the more mediocre-looking record for this season than in previous seasons played in their previous few seasons, Wilkes-Barre would qualify for the ABL Playoffs (which would have a best-of-seven format be used in the semifinal and championship rounds this time around), with their semifinal opponent being the #2 seeded Elmira Colonels instead of the #1 seeded Scranton Miners due to a change in formatting. Unlike the Barons' most recent trip in the ABL Playoffs before this season, Wilkes-Barre would not only upset the newly-added Colonels 4–3 in the semifinal round, but also upset the two-time defending champion #1 seeded Scranton Miners 4–2 to reclaim the ABL championship for the third (and final) time in their franchise history.

== Roster ==
Due to information on American Basketball League players being generally hard to find (especially by the time the ABL was designated more as a minor league during its later years of existence), there are bound to be more gaps and/or inaccuracies found in certain areas on the team's roster spots than usual.

1951–52 Wilkes-Barre Barons roster
Players

Pos.	No.	Player	Height	Weight	DOB	From
F		Edward Bartels	6 ft 5 in (1.96 m)	195 lb (88 kg)	1925-10-08	NC State
F	9, 14	Jim Cathcart	6 ft 4 in (1.93 m)	205 lb (93 kg)	1926-11-22	Arkansas
F	5, 14, 16	Joe Colone	6 ft 5 in (1.96 m)	210 lb (95 kg)	1924-01-23	Bloomsburg
F/C	19	Gene Conley	6 ft 8 in (2.03 m)	225 lb (102 kg)	1930-11-10	Washington State
G	3, 4	Ray Corley	6 ft 0 in (1.83 m)	180 lb (82 kg)	1928-01-14	Georgetown
G	4?	Chink Crossin	6 ft 1 in (1.85 m)	165 lb (75 kg)	1924-07-04	Penn
C	16, 18	Ray Ellefson	6 ft 8 in (2.03 m)	230 lb (104 kg)	1922-09-18	Oklahoma State
G/F	8	Johnny Ezersky	6 ft 3 in (1.91 m)	175 lb (79 kg)	1922-03-21	Rhode Island
G	7	Ted Hanauer	6 ft 1 in (1.85 m)		1924-01-01	Huntington College
F	10, 15, 20	Earl Hawkins	6 ft 4 in (1.93 m)	225 lb (102 kg)	1920-09-23	Auburn
F/C	3, 13	Roger Layne	6 ft 7 in (2.01 m)		1929-02-20	Kentucky
F	5, 14	Jack Leighton	6 ft 2 in (1.88 m)		1928-01-25	Scranton
G	4	Joe Majikes	5 ft 11 in (1.80 m)	160 lb (73 kg)	1929-07-14	Scotland School (PA)
G/F		Tom McLaughlin	6 ft 3 in (1.91 m)		1926-08-14	King's College
F	0, 6, 13	Chuck Mrazovich	6 ft 5 in (1.96 m)	185 lb (84 kg)	1924-02-26	Eastern Kentucky
G	7, 8	John O'Boyle	6 ft 2 in (1.88 m)	185 lb (84 kg)	1928-03-07	Colorado State
G/F		Frank Pozda	6 ft 4 in (1.93 m)	185 lb (84 kg)	1929-08-02	East Stroudsburg State
G	10, 11, 14, 18	Red Wallace	6 ft 1 in (1.85 m)	185 lb (84 kg)	1918-07-12	Scranton
G	15	Jimmy Weston	5 ft 10 in (1.78 m)		1922-11-02	St. John's

Coaches
Head coach

Eddie White, Sr.

Legend
- (DP) Unsigned draft pick
- (FA) Free agent
- (S) Suspended
- Injured

Note: It's currently unknown what the team's roster for the ABL Playoffs for this season was. However, it's suggested that the players who had known jersey numbers are suggested to have stayed with the team by the time the ABL Playoffs began.

== American Basketball League Standings ==
Pos.	Team	Wins	Losses	Win %
1	Scranton Miners - z	24	11	.686
2	Elmira Colonels - x	22	18	.550
3	Wilkes-Barre Barons - x	20	19	.513
4	Saratoga Harlem Yankees / Schenectady Yankees / Saratoga Harlem Yankees*^{[a]} - x	12	16	.429
5	Manchester British-Americans**^{[b]}	8	11	.421
6	Bridgeport Roesslers	9	22	.290
7	Washington Capitols†^{[c]}	15	7	.682
8	Carbondale Aces/Middletown Guards†***^{[d]}	7	13	.350

* – The Schenectady Yankees originally moved out of Saratoga, New York to nearby Schenectady, New York on January 15, 1952 to become the Schenectady Harlem Yankees for a few games before moving back to Saratoga for the rest of their season on February 5, 1952.
** – The Manchester British-Americans joined the ABL's season on New Year's Day in 1952 after previously playing their season in Connecticut's Eastern Basketball League.
*** – According to Total Basketball: The Ultimate Basketball Encyclopedia, the Carbondale Aces might have changed their team name to the Carbondale Big Chiefs at some point during the season. Regardless of whether the Aces did do that or not, the Carbondale franchise would ultimately end up folding their operations on January 20, 1952, with their original 6–8 record being picked up by the Middletown Guards, who ended up going 1–5 on their ends for a combined 7–13 record before they ended up dropping out of the ABL themselves on February 21, 1952.
† – Did not survive the ABL season.

== American Basketball League Playoffs ==
=== American Basketball League Semifinals ===
(3) Wilkes-Barre Barons Vs. (2) Elmira Colonels: Wilkes-Barre wins series 4–3

=== American Basketball League Championship Series ===
(3) Wilkes-Barre Barons Vs. (1) Scranton Miners: Wilkes-Barre wins series 4–2

== Awards and honors ==
By the end of the season, Joe Colone would end up being the leading scorer of the entire league for the nineteenth season of its return and its 25th overall season of its existence with 762 points scored for an average of 19.5 points per game.

== Notes ==
^{a} The Schenectady Yankees originally moved out of Saratoga, New York to nearby Schenectady, New York on January 15, 1952 to become the Schenectady Harlem Yankees for a few games before moving back to Saratoga for the rest of their season on February 5, 1952.
^{b} The Manchester British-Americans joined the ABL's season on New Year's Day in 1952 after previously playing their season in Connecticut's Eastern Basketball League.
^{c} The Washington Capitols in the ABL this season would be the same team that previously folded operations from the NBA in their 1950–51 season. However, the Capitols would fold operations on January 11, 1952 (this time, folding operations for good despite their 15–7 record at the time) due to the NBA threatening to sue the Capitols team and the ABL alike if the Capitols team were to use the same team history as the former BAA/NBA team despite the Washington Capitols technically having history with the ABL first due to them existing as a team in 1944 before becoming the Paterson Crescents in 1945.
^{d} According to Total Basketball: The Ultimate Basketball Encyclopedia, the Carbondale Aces might have changed their team name to the Carbondale Big Chiefs at some point during the season. Regardless of whether the Aces did do that or not, the Carbondale franchise would ultimately end up folding their operations on January 20, 1952, with their original 6–8 record being picked up by the Middletown Guards, who ended up going 1–5 on their ends for a combined 7–13 record before they ended up dropping out of the ABL themselves on February 21, 1952.
