= 1946–47 Wilkes-Barre Barons season =

- League champions
- Conference champions
- League: Eastern Pennsylvania Basketball League
- Head coach: Eddie White, Sr.
- General manager: Eddie White, Sr.
- Owner(s): Eddie White, Sr. John Fetch
- Arena: Ninth Infantry Regiment Armory

Results
- Record: 22–5 (.815)
- Place: Conference: 1st
- Playoff finish: EPBL Champions (Won 2–1 over the Lancaster Red Roses.)

The 1946–47 Wilkes-Barre Barons season was officially the ninth professional basketball season played by the Wilkes-Barre Barons franchise while they were competing in the league that was originally known as the Eastern Pennsylvania Basketball League at the time. Officially speaking, this would also be their first and only season competing in the EPBL while under that specific name after they previously competed in the Pennsylvania State Basketball League (which could be seen as a precursor of sorts to the Eastern Pennsylvania Basketball League) and then briefly competing in the Eastern Basketball League (which potentially was another precursor to the EPBL) before eventually returning in 1938 in the revived version of the American Basketball League for two seasons there (at the time). The creation of the EPBL would occur due, in part, to one of the new co-owners of the team, Eddie White (Sr.), being annoyed with traveling on the road so often when home teams got more money despite his team being considered the best team out in northeastern Pennsylvania and could regularly compete against the National Basketball League's teams both in terms of talented players and paid salaries (with Barons players being able to earn up to $7,500 per season at the time despite the team's minor league status at the time). The EPBL would be created by White and five other team owners in eastern Pennsylvania as a minor league (despite the Barons having the high quality of a professional team) on April 23, 1946, just a few months before the creation of the major Basketball Association of America (now known as the National Basketball Association), with the EPBL lasting up until 2009 as the Continental Basketball Association. Despite the Barons franchise not lasting as long as the EPBL eventually would when it became the CBA, the team themselves would be an instrumental factor for the league's existence thanks to Eddie White Sr.'s own planned desires, even when the Barons later left the EPBL under its initial season of play.

In the inaugural season of the EPBL, the Barons would showcase their talents over the rest of the league almost immediately, as Wilkes-Barre would finish the season with a 22–5 record for a first place finish. That would lead to them easily qualifying for the EPBL Playoffs, which had them going up against the #3 seeded Reading Keys in the semifinal round. From there, the Barons would make easy work in sweeping the Keys 2–0 in the best-of-three semifinal series, which led to them going up against the #2 seeded Lancaster Red Roses (who actually were considered to have been undefeated at home during this season) to determine the inaugural champions of the EPBL (whose championship was named the "President's Cup") for this season. Unsurprisingly, both Lancaster and Wilkes-Barre would end up winning their home games in rather convincing fashion, which led to an argument on where to play the deciding Game 3 since both teams viewed home court advantage very favorably on their ends. Despite the two teams originally agreeing to use a coin flip to determine who got home court advantage for the third and final game of the series, the decisive game was ultimately played on a neutral territory via Rockne Hall in Allentown, Pennsylvania, which led to the Barons winning 62–58 to claim the inaugural President's Cup championship. Despite the Barons creating the EPBL for their own purposes, however, both the EPBL champion Wilkes-Barre Barons and runner-up Lancaster Red Roses would decide to defect to the bigger-looking American Basketball League (where the Barons previously competed in from 1938 until 1940) to showcase their skills against better-looking competition, though the Lancaster franchise would ultimately end up returning to the EPBL during the early portion of the upcoming season for their swift return not long afterward.

== Roster ==
Due to information on Eastern Pennsylvania Basketball League players being generally hard to find (especially for the early history of the league's existence as a minor basketball league of sorts), there are bound to be more gaps and/or inaccuracies found in certain areas on the team's roster spots than usual.

1946–47 Wilkes-Barre Barons roster
Players

Pos.	No.	Player	Height	Weight	DOB	From
F		Al Brightman	6 ft 2 in (1.88 m)	195 lb (88 kg)	1923-09-22	Morris Harvey College
F	5	Bill Chanecka	6 ft 4 in (1.93 m)	185 lb (84 kg)	1924-04-21	Binghamton Central HS (NY)
G	3	Steve Chanecka	6 ft 2 in (1.88 m)	205 lb (93 kg)	1918-02-06	Binghamton Central HS (NY)
G	12?	Chick Craig	6 ft 1 in (1.85 m)	180 lb (82 kg)	1922-07-23	Long Island
		Larry Disque			1921-03-27	East Stroudsburg State
		Paul Eike			1919-08-15	No college
		Rocco English			1919-01-30	No college
G	4?	Carl Frank			1925-01-28	St. Nicholas HS (PA)
G/F	6	Earl Hafner	5 ft 9 in (1.75 m)	160 lb (73 kg)	1921-07-29	No college
G	4	Ted Hanauer	6 ft 1 in (1.85 m)		1924-01-01	Huntington College
		Joe Karpinsky			1917-04-28	No college
C	12	Ted Koniesky			1917-08-25	No college
G	8	Johnny Mascavage			1918-01-14	No college
	10	Billy Mock			1920-11-02	No college
F	9	Cas Ostrowski	6 ft 2 in (1.88 m)	170 lb (77 kg)	1924-07-24	Scranton
	11	Carl Zavada			1929-06-06	No college

Coaches
Head coach

Eddie White, Sr.

Legend
- (DP) Unsigned draft pick
- (FA) Free agent
- (S) Suspended
- Injured

== Eastern Pennsylvania Basketball League Standings ==
Pos.	Team	W	L	PCT	GB
1	Wilkes-Barre Barons	22	5	.815	—
2	Lancaster Red Roses	20	10	.667	3.5
3	Reading Keys	15	13	.536	7.5
4	Hazleton Mountaineers	11	17	.393	11.5
5	Allentown Rockets	8	18	.308	13.5
6	Binghamton Triplets / Pottsville Pros	7	20	.259	15

== Eastern Pennsylvania Basketball League Playoffs ==
=== Eastern Pennsylvania Basketball League Semifinals ===
(1) Wilkes-Barre Barons Vs. (3) Reading Keys: Wilkes-Barre win series 2–0

- Game 1 @ Wilkes-Barre: Wilkes-Barre 45, Reading 41
- Game 2 @ Reading: Wilkes-Barre 62, Reading 58

=== Eastern Pennsylvania Basketball League Championship Series ===
(1) Wilkes-Barre Barons Vs. (2) Lancaster Red Roses: Wilkes-Barre win series 2–1

- Game 1 @ Lancaster: Lancaster 59, Wilkes-Barre 54
- Game 2 @ Wilkes-Barre: Wilkes-Barre 65, Trenton 37
- Game 3 @ Allentown: Wilkes-Barre 70, Lancaster 54
