= 1947–48 Wilkes-Barre Barons season =

American Basketball League season

- League champions
- Conference champions
- League: American Basketball League (revived original)
- Head coach: Eddie White, Sr.
- General manager: Eddie White, Sr.
- Owner(s): Eddie White, Sr.
- Arena: Ninth Infantry Regiment Armory

Results
- Record: 26–8 (.765)
- Place: Conference: 1st
- Playoff finish: Won ABL championship 2-1 over the Paterson Crescents

The 1947–48 Wilkes-Barre Barons season was the tenth professional basketball season played by the Wilkes-Barre Barons franchise while they were competing in the revived version of the American Basketball League. This would also be their third season competing in the revived version of the ABL after previously competing in the Pennsylvania State Basketball League and then briefly competing in the Eastern Basketball League before later going on a long hiatus (potentially as an independent team) before returning to the ABL from 1938 until 1940 and then eventually returning to the Eastern Pennsylvania Basketball League for its inaugural 1946–47 season. Originally, the Barons joined the EPBL runner-ups in the Lancaster (Red) Roses to defect from the more minor-looking EPBL to the more major-looking ABL, but the (Red) Roses would end up returning to the EPBL after a poor start there, which led to the Barons being one of only seven teams competing for the ABL's championship for the rest of the season going forward. When entering their returning season into the ABL as a major, professional basketball team, Wilkes-Barre would look like a team that didn't miss a beat from their transition between the minor EPBL and the major ABL (even after the Lancaster (Red) Roses decided to return to EPBL without the Barons), as the Wilkes-Barre Barons would put up a 26–8 record that had them get an easy first-place finish in the regular season thanks to Cas Ostrowski leading the league in scoring this season. As such, their first ever playoff match in the ABL would have them go up against the defending ABL champions, the #3 seeded Trenton Tigers.

After having a close Game 1 victory in Wilkes-Barre, the Barons would end up sweeping the Tigers 2–0 by March 28, 1948, to compete in the ABL's championship series against the #2 seeded Paterson Crescents, who would have their best season in league history by this time. After the Barons and Crescents split their first two games played in the championship series, Wilkes-Barre would take a bit of a break from the championship series held in the ABL to compete in the 1948 World Professional Basketball Tournament, which was the final version of the World Professional Basketball Tournament ever held in the event's history. Unfortunately for the Wilkes-Barre Barons, their first round opponent would be up against the impending champions of the rivaling National Basketball League, the Minneapolis Lakers (who would be led by superstar center George Mikan starting this season). This would cause the Barons to be destroyed by the Lakers with a 98–48 beatdown in the first round match that eventually saw the future NBA franchise winning the final WPBT championship ever held over the all-black New York Renaissance. Despite that massive setback on their ends, Wilkes-Barre would later end up winning 51–43 over Paterson at home on April 17 to win the ABL's championship series 2–1 to get their first championship in the ABL in the process. Following this season's conclusion, White would try to have his Barons team apply for the rivaling Basketball Association of America for its 1948–49 season, similar to what the original Baltimore Bullets had done the previous season. However, similar to what would happen to the failed BAA Buffalo team that never happened and a planned BAA team from Louisville, Kentucky that never happened (alongside the rivaling National Basketball League's Oshkosh All-Stars and Toledo Jeeps), their move into the BAA never happened, and similar to Oshkosh staying in the NBL for another season, Wilkes-Barre would stay in the ABL for another season themselves.

== Roster ==
Due to information on American Basketball League players being generally hard to find (especially by the time the ABL was designated more as a minor league during its later years of existence), there are bound to be more gaps and/or inaccuracies found in certain areas on the team's roster spots than usual.

1947–48 Wilkes-Barre Barons roster
Players

Pos.	No.	Player	Height	Weight	DOB	From
F/C	10	Herschel Baltimore	6 ft 4 in (1.93 m)	195 lb (88 kg)	1921-06-21	Penn State
F/C	9	John Barr	6 ft 3 in (1.91 m)	205 lb (93 kg)	1918-08-08	Penn State
G/F		Paul Chadick	5 ft 11 in (1.80 m)	175 lb (79 kg)	1918-05-25	Saint Joseph's
F	5	Bill Chanecka	6 ft 4 in (1.93 m)	185 lb (84 kg)	1924-04-21	Binghamton Central HS (NY)
G	3	Steve Chanecka	6 ft 2 in (1.88 m)	205 lb (93 kg)	1918-02-06	Binghamton Central HS (NY)
G	12	Chick Craig	6 ft 1 in (1.85 m)	180 lb (82 kg)	1922-07-23	Long Island
		Larry Disque			1921-03-27	East Stroudsburg State
G/F	5	Red Dehnert	6 ft 3 in (1.91 m)	175 lb (79 kg)	1924-01-24	Columbia
G	4	Carl Frank			1925-01-28	St. Nicholas HS (PA)
G	7	Ted Hanauer	6 ft 1 in (1.85 m)		1924-01-01	Huntington College
C		Art Hillhouse	6 ft 7 in (2.01 m)	220 lb (100 kg)	1916-06-12	Long Island
F	6	Cas Ostrowski	6 ft 2 in (1.88 m)	170 lb (77 kg)	1924-07-24	Scranton
		Johnny Rusinko			1925-03-01	Penn State
G		Joey Thomas	5 ft 8 in (1.73 m)	155 lb (70 kg)	1919-11-12	Scranton

Coaches
Head coach

Eddie White, Sr.

Legend
- (DP) Unsigned draft pick
- (FA) Free agent
- (S) Suspended
- Injured

Note: It's currently unknown what the team's roster for the ABL Playoffs for this season was. However, what is known for this team is that their roster from the 1948 World Professional Basketball Tournament in their brief time there (which might subsequently relate to their final roster in the ABL Playoffs for this season) included Herschel Baltimore, John Barr, Bill Chanecka, Steve Chanecka, Chick Craig, Red Dehnert, Ted Hanauer, and Cas Ostrowski, with Carl Frank also being on the team's roster as well (though he failed to play in the tournament for their only game there).

== American Basketball League Standings ==
Due to the decreased number of teams this season, the ABL would remove divisions from their league this season going forward after previously using them for their previous season of play.

Pos.	Team	Wins	Losses	Win %
1	Wilkes-Barre Barons	26	8	.765
2	Paterson Crescents	19	16	.543
3	Trenton Tigers	17	15	.531
4	Jersey City Atoms / Scranton Miners^{[a]}	16	16	.500
5	Elizabeth Braves / Hartford Hurricanes^{[b]}	11	12	.478
6	Philadelphia SPHAs	13	19	.406
7	Brooklyn Gothams	8	20	.286
8	Lancaster (Red) Roses^{[c]}	1	5	.167

== American Basketball League Playoffs ==
=== American Basketball League Semifinals ===
(1) Wilkes-Barre Barons Vs. (3) Trenton Tigers: Wilkes-Barre win series 2–0

- Game 1: March 24, 1948 @ Wilkes-Barre: Wilkes-Barre 53, Trenton 52
- Game 2: March 28, 1948 @ Trenton: Wilkes-Barre 102, Trenton 84

=== American Basketball League Championship Series ===
(1) Wilkes-Barre Barons Vs. (2) Paterson Crescents: Wilkes-Barre win series 2–1

- Game 1: March 31, 1948 @ Wilkes-Barre: Wilkes-Barre 70, Paterson 63
- Game 2: April 4, 1948 @ Paterson: Paterson 65, Wilkes-Barre 57
- Game 3: April 17, 1948 @ Wilkes-Barre: Wilkes-Barre 51, Paterson 43

The delay from Games 2 to 3 in this series related to the Wilkes-Barre Barons competing in the 1948 World Professional Basketball Tournament during this period of time.

== Awards and honors ==
By the end of the season, Cas Ostrowski would end up being the leading scorer of the entire league for the fifteenth season of its return and its 21st overall season of its existence with 561 points scored for an average of 18.1 points per game, the latter of which was a league record for points per game at the time.

== World Professional Basketball Tournament ==
Because the Wilkes-Barre Barons both previously won the championship for the Eastern Pennsylvania Basketball League and had the best record in the American Basketball League (with the Barons looking to win the ABL's championship soon afterward), the Barons would be the final ABL team to participate in the World Professional Basketball Tournament, with the final WPBT tournament that took place in 1948 occurring on April 8–11, 1948 and consisted mostly of teams from the National Basketball League alongside two independently ran teams in the all-black New York Renaissance (who eventually were named members of the Naismith Basketball Hall of Fame) and the Bridgeport Newfield Steelers (a former New England Basketball League team who later joined the ABL by the end of this season). Incidentally, the two independently ran teams would compete against each other in the first round, meaning Wilkes-Barre would get an NBL team by default (specifically either the Anderson Duffey Packers, the Fort Wayne Zollner Pistons, the defending WPBT champion Indianapolis Kautskys, the eventual NBL champions in the Minneapolis Lakers, or the Tri-Cities Blackhawks, all of which ended up becoming BAA/NBA teams in their later histories) as their first round opponent. Unfortunately for Wilkes-Barre, their first round opponent would be against the team that ultimately won the penultimate NBL championship ever won in that league's history, which would be the Minneapolis Lakers, who would be led by a rising star and future Naismith Basketball Hall of Famer in young center George Mikan. Not only that, but the talent discrepancies between the ABL and the NBL would be so vast by this point in time (with the ABL being seen by most media outlets as a minor league by comparison to both the NBL and the newly established Basketball Association of America) that the Lakers would end up hoisting the biggest blowout victory in the tournament's decade-long history, with them straight up destroying the Barons through a 98–48 beatdown that might as well have brought great shame upon the ABL's reputation in the process. The Lakers would later not only go on to win the final WPBT championship with a fitting finale against the inaugural WPBT champions, the New York Renaissance, but they would still continue existing in the present day (albeit in the merged NBA) as the present-day (world famous) Los Angeles Lakers. As for the Barons, they would continue existing under the specific Wilkes-Barre name until 1979 (although they'd have one more season of play in the Continental Basketball Association as the Pennsylvania Barons before moving to New Jersey in 1980 and then had one final season in the CBA as the Scranton Aces before folding operations a year later in 1981), but their history would be more expansive due to them continuing to remain in the ABL until it folded operations in 1953 before the Barons returned to the EPBL (now operating as the Eastern Professional Basketball League) a year later, where they remained until 1970 when it became the Eastern Basketball Association, with the Barons remaining there as the Wilkes-Barre Barons (outside of a season and a half of inactivity due to Hurricane Agnes) before they later rebranded themselves for the CBA (as the Pennsylvania Barons) and eventually folded operations not long afterward.

=== Game Played ===
- Lost first round (48–98) to the Minneapolis Lakers.

== Notes ==
^{a} Originally, the Jersey City Atoms would move from Jersey City, New Jersey to nearby Union City, New Jersey on January 16, 1948 (though it doesn't appear that the Jersey City Atoms rebranded their team by this point in time) before moving again to Scranton, Pennsylvania to become the Scranton Miners twelve days later on January 28, 1948, for the rest of the season going forward.
^{b} The Elizabeth Braves would move from Elizabeth, New Jersey to Hartford, Connecticut on December 19, 1947, to become the Hartford Hurricanes for the rest of the season.
^{c} The Lancaster Roses (sometimes referred to as the Lancaster Red Roses instead) would end up withdrawing their operations from the ABL early in the season on December 4, 1947, to return to the Eastern Professional Basketball League not long afterward.
