= 1948 World Professional Basketball Tournament =

World Professional Basketball Tournament
- 1948

Tournament information
- Location: Chicago, Illinois
- Dates: 8 April–11 April
- Venue: Chicago Stadium
- Teams: 8

Final positions
- Champions: Minneapolis Lakers
- 1st runner-up: New York Renaissance
- 2nd runner-up: Anderson Duffey Packers

Tournament statistics
- MVP: George Mikan
- Top scorer: George Mikan

The 1948 World Professional Basketball Tournament was the tenth and final edition of the World Professional Basketball Tournament. It was held in Chicago, Illinois, during the days of 8–11 April 1948 and featured eight teams, who by this point in time were primarily competing in the National Basketball League, with the only other professional team competing being the Wilkes-Barre Barons of the American Basketball League (who competed against what were to be the newly established Minneapolis Lakers in the quarterfinal round) and the only two independently ran teams being the New York Renaissance and the Bridgeport Newfield Steelers, who competed against each other in the quarterfinal round. Initially, there was supposed to have been a championship series between the champions of the National Basketball League (which were the Minneapolis Lakers) and the recently created Basketball Association of America (which were formerly the American Basketball League's own Baltimore Bullets, which was also the BAA's original Baltimore Bullets franchise) that year, but that ultimately never came to fruition. It was won by the Minneapolis Lakers (joining the Oshkosh All-Stars and Fort Wayne Zollner Pistons as the only other professional teams to win multiple championships during the same season throughout the 1940s), who defeated the New York Renaissance 75–71 in the title game, behind George Mikan's tournament record 40 points. The Anderson Duffey Packers came in third after beating the Tri-Cities Blackhawks 66–44 in the third-place game. Mikan led all scorers and was named the tournament's Most Valuable Player. With George Mikan winning the tournament's MVP award in both 1946 with the Chicago American Gears (despite his team not winning that year's event) and the final tournament ever held in 1948 with the Lakers, he would join Buddy Jeannette of the Detroit Eagles in 1941 and the Fort Wayne Zollner Pistons four years later in 1945 as the only other player to be named the MVP of the WPBT for multiple years (both of whom would earn the honor while being with different teams).

Following this tournament's conclusion alongside the 1948 NBL Finals and 1948 BAA Finals, the Fort Wayne Zollner Pistons (soon rebranded to just be the Fort Wayne Pistons), Indianapolis Kautskys (soon rebranded as the Indianapolis Jets), and WPBT/NBL champion Minneapolis Lakers alongside the Rochester Royals would all jump ship from the NBL to the BAA by the start of the 1948 BAA draft, which started to signify the end of the WPBT as an established tournament to help determine the best of the best basketball teams across the nation. An attempt to run a similar tournament was held in 1949 by The Indianapolis News, which would have featured the Wilkes-Barre Barons of the ABL, three teams from the NBL, three teams from the upstart Basketball Association of America, and a team from a fourth professional league of sorts that remained unidentified until seeding was supposed to have been drawn out, but the BAA ultimately declined the invitation despite the NBL accepting the invitation themselves. Months after the spiritual successor to the WPBT failed to come to fruition, the BAA and NBL agreed to merge leagues together to become the modern-day National Basketball Association (which meant the other NBL teams from this year's tournament in the Anderson Duffey Packers (later rebranded to just be the Anderson Packers) and Tri-Cities Blackhawks joined most of the other NBL teams (including a planned expansion team called the Indianapolis Olympians alongside most of the surviving BAA teams in a sort of reunion with those teams there, though the Kautskys/Jets franchise wouldn't survive the merger due to them being bankrupt a year later), which essentially put an end to the WPBT entirely for good.

== Results ==
=== Bracket ===
Quarterfinals
April 8
Minneapolis Lakers	98
Wilkes-Barre Barons	48
April 8
Anderson Duffey Packers	59
Indianapolis Kautskys	53
April 8
New York Renaissance	67
Bridgeport Newfield Steelers	51
April 8
Tri-Cities Blackhawks	57
Fort Wayne Zollner Pistons	50

Semifinals
April 9
Minneapolis Lakers	59
Anderson Duffey Packers	56
April 9
New York Renaissance	59
Tri-Cities Blackhawks	55

Final
April 11
Minneapolis Lakers	75
New York Renaissance	71
Third Place
April 11
Tri-Cities Blackhawks	44
Anderson Duffey Packers	66

=== Third place game ===
April 11, 1948

Box score

Tri-Cities Blackhawks 44, Anderson Duffey Packers 66
Scoring by half: 27–27, 17–39
Pts: W. von Nieda – 15	Pts: R. Johnson – 14

Chicago Stadium
Attendance: 16,892
Referees: Bill Downs, Dutch Kriznecky

=== Championship game ===
April 11, 1948

Box score

Minneapolis Lakers 75, New York Renaissance 71
Scoring by half: 43–35, 32–36
Pts: G. Mikan – 40	Pts: N. Clifton – 24

Chicago Stadium
Attendance: 16,892

== Individual awards ==
- George Mikan of the Minneapolis Lakers led this tournament in scoring with 83 points scored in four games played.

=== All-Tournament First Team ===
- C - George Mikan, Minneapolis Lakers (MVP)
- F - Nat Clifton, New York Renaissance
- F - Jim Pollard, Minneapolis Lakers
- G - Charley Shipp, Anderson Duffey Packers
- G - Herm Schaefer, Minneapolis Lakers

=== All-Tournament Second Team ===
- C - Howie Schultz, Anderson Duffey Packers
- F - Dick Triptow, Fort Wayne Zollner Pistons
- F - John Hargis, Anderson Duffey Packers
- F - Whitey Von Nieda, Tri-Cities Blackhawks
- G - Bobby McDermott, Tri-Cities Blackhawks
- G - George Crowe, New York Renaissance

== See also ==
- 1947–48 National Basketball League (United States) season, a professional basketball season featuring six out of eleven teams there, including the eventual NBL and WPBT champions in the Minneapolis Lakers
- 1947–48 Wilkes-Barre Barons season, a professional basketball season involving the former (inaugural) champions of the minor Eastern Pennsylvania Basketball League and the eventual champions of the revived version of the original American Basketball League in the (revived version of the) Wilkes-Barre Barons franchise
