= Barry Goldstein (golf) =

American golfer

Barry Goldstein is a golf instructor based out of Coral Springs, FL and Binghamton, NY. He has received recognition for teaching junior golfers as well as amateurs and professional golfers. Barry was a notable amateur golfer that played in South Florida tournaments with Tiger Woods as a teenager.

== Early life ==
Goldstein was born and raised in Binghamton, NY and attended Binghamton High School. He was the captain of the ice hockey team and a baseball player, and ultimately decided to play baseball at Florida Atlantic University. Once his baseball career ended, he turned to golf. He quickly took to the game, competing as an amateur golfer. His focus would soon shift to the teaching side of golf. He learned to teach golf under instructor Jimmy Ballard. Goldstein still credits much of his success to his tutor Ballard, who laid a foundation that focused on the fundamentals of the game.

== Teaching ==
Goldstein teaches across a range of ability, from beginners to PGA professionals. He has worked with many amateur and professional golfers such as former PGA Tour Pro and tournament winner Mike Standly. Another notable current student is Lev Grinberg, a junior and amateur phenom that made a European Tour cut at age 14 and played on the winning European junior Ryder Cup team in 2023. Many times Goldstein has been selected as one of Americas Top 25 Instructors by Golf Tips Magazine. One of Barry's biggest personal accomplishments is being the coach and caddy for his daughter, Carly Goldstein, who won the Florida State Golf Title in 2012 and was a member of the LSU Tigers Golf Team. In recent years, Goldstein has focused more on the development of the next generation of golf, training elite juniors throughout the country. Goldstein has emerged as an elite "Top 25" and "Top 50" coach multiple times.

== Media and journalism ==
Being on the Golf Channel a number of times propelled Goldstein to a top and trusted professional. He has contributed and appeared in golf articles for a variety of magazines, radio stations and newspapers. Some of the published articles appear in Golf Tips Magazine, Golf Week, Golf Talk Live, Bleacher Report, Binghamton Homepage, Sun Sentinel, and PGA.com. Goldstein was on the cover of the July/August 2018 Golf Tips Magazine. Barry appears live on Sirius XM radio several times a year on the Dusty and Danny show and The Mad Dog Chris Russo show, as he does a Masters, US Open and Ryder Cup preview on their national radio shows.

A 2019 Golf Channel show, Vantage Point hosted by Mike Tirico, details Goldstein's relationship with his student Kody Finn from Parkland, Florida, who survived the tragic shooting at Stoneman Douglas High School and how golf has helped him heal.

In 2019 Goldstein was honored as a distinguished graduate of Binghamton High School.

Currently, he is the host of Golf With Goldstein, a YouTube based golf video series broadcast on 24K Sports YouTube Channel. These video consist of golf instruction, special guests, exercise tips and all around golf talk.
