= Moe Radovich =

American basketball player and college coach (1929–2004)

Personal information
- Born: May 5, 1929 Hot Springs County, Wyoming, U.S.
- Died: June 18, 2004 (aged 75)
- Listed height: 6 ft 0 in (1.83 m)
- Listed weight: 160 lb (73 kg)

Career information
- High school: Thermopolis (Thermopolis, Wyoming)
- College: Powell JC (1948–1949); Wyoming (1949–1952)
- NBA draft: 1952: 8th round, 73rd overall pick
- Drafted by: Philadelphia Warriors
- Position: Point guard
- Number: 4
- Coaching career: 1955–1976

Career history

Playing
- 1952–1953: Wilkes-Barre Barons
- 1952: Philadelphia Warriors

Coaching
- 1955–1957: Sheridan JC
- 1957–1959: Wayne State JC
- 1967–1972: Wyoming (assistant)
- 1972–1973: Fullerton JC
- 1973–1976: Wyoming
- Stats at NBA.com
- Stats at Basketball Reference

George Lewis "Moe" Radovich (May 5, 1929 – June 18, 2004) was an American professional basketball player and college head coach. Radovich was selected in the 1952 NBA draft by the Philadelphia Warriors after a collegiate career at Wyoming. He played for the Warriors in November 1952 in only four games, averaging 3.5 points, 0.3 rebounds and 2.0 assists per contest. Radovich was also a college coach for Fullerton Junior College, and Wyoming.

== Early life ==
Radovich served as a lieutenant in the U.S. Army for two years during the Korean War.

== Career playing statistics ==
Legend
| GP | Games played | GS | Games started | MPG | Minutes per game |
| FG% | Field goal percentage | 3P% | 3-point field goal percentage | FT% | Free throw percentage |
| RPG | Rebounds per game | APG | Assists per game | SPG | Steals per game |
| BPG | Blocks per game | PPG | Points per game | **Bold** | Career high |

=== NBA ===
==== Regular season ====
| Year | Team | GP | MPG | FG% | FT% | RPG | APG | PPG |
|---|---|---|---|---|---|---|---|---|
| 1952–53 | Philadelphia | 4 | 8.3 | .385 | 1.000 | .3 | 2.0 | 3.5 |

== Head coaching record ==
Record table
| Season | Team | Overall | Conference | Standing | Postseason |
|---|---|---|---|---|---|
**Sheridan JC Generals** (Independent) (1955–1957)
| Sheridan JC: | | ?–? | | | |
**Wayne State JC Wildcats** (Independent) (1957–1959)
| 1957–58 | Wayne State JC | 14–8 | | | |
| 1958–59 | Wayne State JC | 17–8 | | | |
| Wayne State JC: | | 31–16 | | | |
**Fullerton Junior College Hornets** () (1972–1973)
| 1972–73 | Fullerton Junior College | 9–17 | 3–7 | | |
| Fullerton Junior College: | | 9–17 | 3–7 | | |
**Wyoming Cowboys** (Western Athletic Conference) (1973–1976)
| 1973–74 | Wyoming | 4–22 | 0–14 | 8th | |
| 1974–75 | Wyoming | 10–16 | 3–11 | 8th | |
| 1975–76 | Wyoming | 10–17 | 2–12 | 8th | |
| Wyoming: | | 24–55 | 5–37 | | |
| Total: | | 64–88 | | | |
National champion Postseason invitational champion Conference regular season champion Conference regular season and conference tournament champion Division regular season champion Division regular season and conference tournament champion Conference tournament champion
