= Eddie Miller (basketball) =

American basketball player

Personal information
- Born: June 18, 1931 New Rochelle, New York, U.S.
- Died: April 9, 2014 (aged 82) Boca Raton, Florida, U.S.
- Listed height: 6 ft 8 in (2.03 m)
- Listed weight: 225 lb (102 kg)

Career information
- High school: New Rochelle (New Rochelle, New York)
- College: Syracuse (1949–1952)
- NBA draft: 1952: 2nd round, 10th overall pick
- Drafted by: Milwaukee Hawks
- Playing career: 1952–1954
- Position: Center
- Number: 15

Career history
- 1952: Milwaukee Hawks
- 1952–1954: Baltimore Bullets

Career NBA statistics
- Points: 1,452 (10.2 ppg)
- Rebounds: 1,206 (8.5 rpg)
- Assists: 210 (1.5 apg)
- Stats at NBA.com
- Stats at Basketball Reference

Edwin B. Miller (June 18, 1931 – April 9, 2014) was an American National Basketball Association (NBA) player. Miller was drafted by the Milwaukee Hawks in the second round of the 1952 NBA draft. Later into the season, Miller was traded to the Baltimore Bullets for George Ratkovicz. Following the Bullets' fold, Miller was drafted in the dispersal draft by the Boston Celtics, but did not play a regular season game with the team.

== Career statistics ==
Legend
GP	Games played	GS	Games started	MPG	Minutes per game
FG%	Field goal percentage	3P%	3-point field goal percentage	FT%	Free throw percentage
RPG	Rebounds per game	APG	Assists per game	SPG	Steals per game
BPG	Blocks per game	PPG	Points per game	**Bold**	Career high

=== NBA ===
==== Regular season ====
Year	Team	GP	MPG	FG%	FT%	RPG	APG	PPG
1952–53	Milwaukee	10	16.0	.268	.529	6.0	.6	3.9
1952–53	Baltimore	60	**31.0**	.356	.659	**10.2**	**1.8**	**11.6**
1953–54	Baltimore	**72**	23.0	**.407**	**.729**	7.5	1.3	10.0
Career		142	25.9	.374	.692	8.5	1.5	10.2

==== Playoffs ====
Year	Team	GP	MPG	FG%	FT%	RPG	APG	PPG
1953	Baltimore	2	46.5	.382	.438	18.0	2.5	16.5
