= Joe Dean =

American athlete, sports broadcaster and college athletics administrator

Joe Dean (April 26, 1930 − November 17, 2013) is known as "Mr. String Music" and was the voice of Southeastern Conference basketball for most of the 1970s and 1980s. In 2012, he was elected to the National Collegiate Basketball Hall of Fame, as a contributor to the game.

== Biography ==
=== Early life and playing career ===
Joe Dean was born in Brazil, Indiana and was raised in New Albany, Indiana, in a one-bedroom home with his parents, Cyril and Thelma, as well as his older sister Louise. His full name was Robert Joe Dean, and he went by "Bob Joe" early in life. However, it was on the basketball courts in his hometown where he was tagged with the name, "Jojo," that he would be known by those closest to him throughout his life.

Dean was a starter on his high school team at New Albany High School, including a stint as the team's captain during his senior year. Dean was extremely close to his high school coach Gordon Raney, who suggested Dean attend LSU, where he thought Dean would receive more playing time. In 2007, Dean became an inductee into the inaugural class of the New Albany High School Hall of Fame.

Dean played at LSU from 1949 through 1952. His first two seasons, he led the team in scoring with 10.8 points/game (1949–50) and 15.2 points/game (1950–51). The 15.2 points/game was a school record at the time. He left LSU ranked as the school's second all-time leading scorer (1,072 points) and first in points/game (14.7).

In his three years, Dean was a two-time All-SEC performer. He was also a three-time member of the SEC All-Tournament Team, the only player to earn such distinction prior to the tournament's suspension in 1953 (it was later resumed in 1979).

Dean was the first LSU player to be selected in the NBA draft, taken fourth overall by the Indianapolis Olympians in the 1952 NBA draft. He instead chose to play for the Bartlesville Phillips 66ers of the National Industrial Basketball League.

In 1956, the U.S. Olympic Trials was a four-team tournament. The winning team named its five starters to the Olympic squad, and five other players from the tournament were also named. The four competing teams were the AAU champions and runner up, an Armed Forces all-star squad and a college all-star squad. Dean's Phillips 66ers won the tournament and were awarded five players to the U.S. Olympic Team. Dean, despite being fourth on the team in scoring in the tournament and starting a majority of the games, was not one of the five choices. He was subsequently named an alternate to the team. In 1958, he was an NIBL All-Star.

In the Spring of 2008, Dean was voted on to the LSU All-Decade Team for the 1950s in an online vote by fans at the school's official website. The next year, he was voted onto the LSU All-Century Team. Other members include former teammate Bob Pettit, Pete Maravich, Shaquille O'Neal and Chris Jackson.

=== Broadcasting career ===
Dean is most famous for his work as a color analyst for Southeastern Conference basketball games, which he covered for 20 years. He coined the phrase "String Music" and is also known for other phrases such as, "Stufferino in Lexington, KY", "tickling the twine" and "string music in Music City". During his run, he worked with NBC, TBS, ESPN, TVS, SPI/Lorimar and Jefferson Pilot.

=== As athletic director at LSU ===
Dean gave up announcing in April 1987, when he took over the athletic director post at his alma mater, LSU. He served from April 1987 through the end of the 2000 calendar year, with the LSU's 2000 Peach Bowl victory over Georgia Tech being his last official event as athletic director. During his tenure, Dean oversaw arguably the greatest athletic era in school history. The LSU baseball team won five national championships (1991, 1993, 1996, 1997, 2000) while the men's and women's track teams accounted for 22 national championships combined, including a record 11-consecutive NCAA Outdoor Track and Field championships by the women's team. At the time of his retirement, the 27 national championships under Dean's guidance were an SEC record.

The LSU football team won one SEC Championship (1988), two SEC Western Division Championships (1996, 1997) and four bowl victories (1995, 1996, 1997, 2000) in his 14 years. Among Dean's final major decisions at the helm of the athletic department was to hire Nick Saban as head football coach.

Saban led LSU to SEC Championships in 2001 and 2003 as well as the school's first national championship in 45 years in 2003. Basketball head coach John Brady guided LSU to the 2000 SEC Championship and 2006 Final Four before being fired during the 2008 season. After Dean's 14 years, he was succeeded in 2001 by former baseball coach Skip Bertman.

=== Awards and honors ===
In the Summer of 2007, Dean was named the 18th most influential person in the history of the SEC by the Birmingham News. He was also chosen as one of the top voices in the history of the conference, placing seventh according to the Birmingham News. The lists were created in honor of the league's 75th Anniversary.

Dean is a member of the National Collegiate Basketball Hall of Fame, the Indiana Basketball Hall of Fame, the NABC Hall of Fame, the Louisiana Hall of Fame and the LSU Hall of Fame.

=== Dixie Basketball Camp ===
In 1966, Dean began a basketball camp just outside Baton Rouge, La., at Lake Side Oaks. Later, in 1974, he moved the camp to Southwest Mississippi Community College in Summit, Miss., where the camp has been held each July ever since. It is believed to be the longest running basketball camp in the United States. The camp will be in its 52nd year in 2017 with Joe Dean Jr. serving as the camp director. Camp motto: "I Love Sweat!"

The camp is a legacy for Dean that lives on through its characters and traditions. Multiple Division I coaches have gone through the ranks at Dixie, including Final Four coach John Brady, Kermit Davis and many others. Previous camp participants include SEC all-time assist leader Sean Touhy, NFL all-time great Peyton Manning and current NBA player Garrett Temple.

=== Personal life ===
Dean married the former Doris Kernan Hall of Marksville, La., in 1952 and the two were together for 50 years before she passed. They were parents to three children, Joe Jr., Mardi and Mark. Joe Dean Jr. played college basketball at Mississippi State; he was the head coach for the UCF Knights for four seasons (1989-90 - 1992–93) as well as the former athletic director at Birmingham–Southern College in Birmingham, Alabama. Mark played college basketball at UL-Monroe (then Northeast Louisiana).

== Death ==
On November 17, 2013, Dean died from complications of a heart-related illness in his Baton Rouge residence. He was 83.
