= Binghamton City School District =

School district in New York, United States

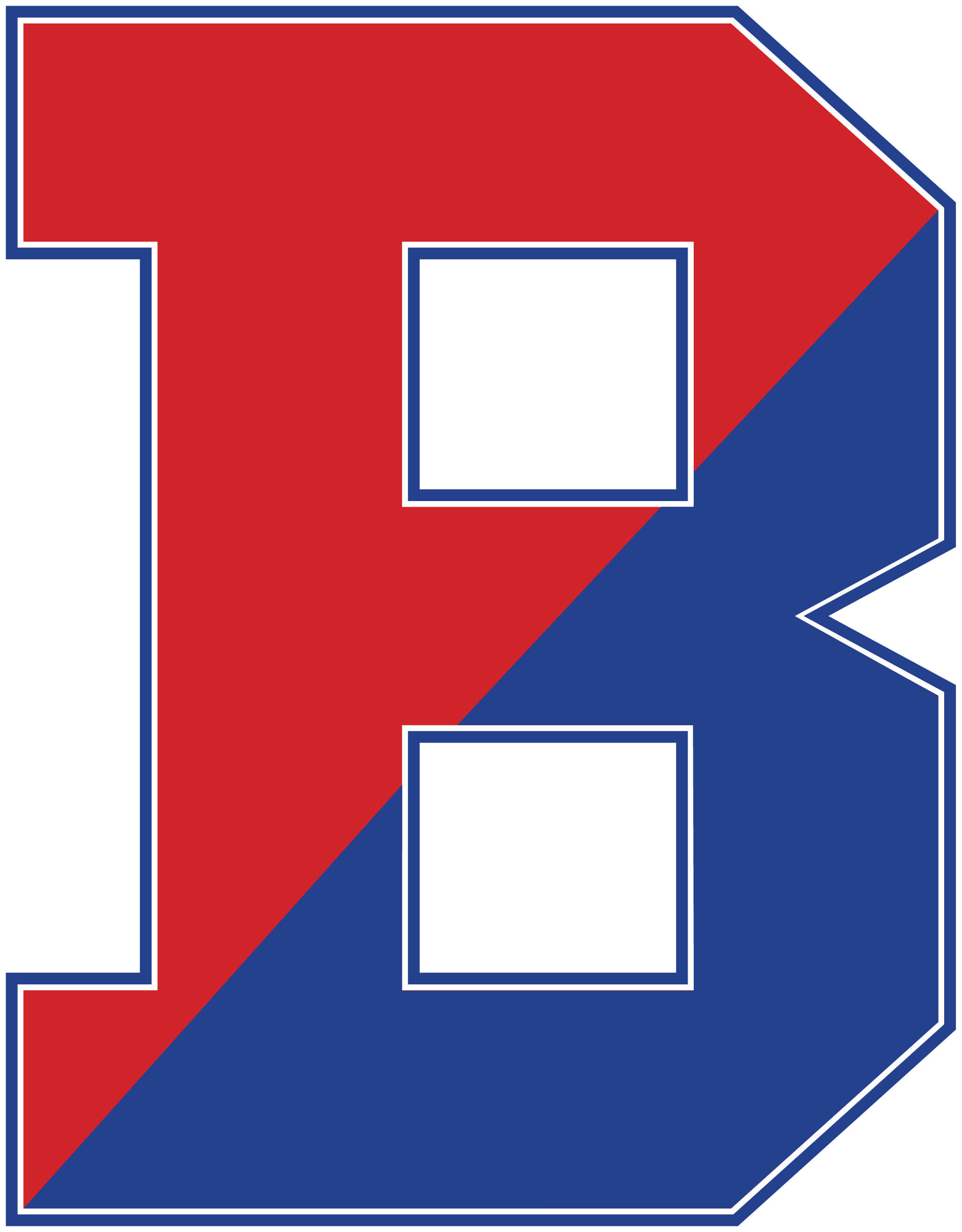

Location
- 164 Hawley Street Binghamton, New York United States

District information
- Type: State school
- Superintendent: Dr. Tonia Thompson
- Budget: US$117.1 million (2018)

Students and staff
- Students: 6100 (2007)
- Athletic conference: Southern Tier Athletic Conference

Other information
- Teachers' unions: United Federation of Teachers; New York State United Teachers; American Federation of Teachers
- Website: www.binghamtonschools.org

Binghamton City School District is the public school district for the city of Binghamton, New York.

As of 2021 about 5,000 students in total were enrolled in the district. In the 2017 and 2018 school years, 60% of students were minorities, and slightly more than half were eligible for free or reduced lunch.

== Board of education ==
The Board of Education (BOE) consists of 7 members who serve rotating 5-year terms. Elections are held each May for board members and to vote on the School District Budget.

Current board members are:

- Brian Whalen - President
- Korin Kirk - Vice President
- Tim Ames
- Liz Rosenberg
- David Hawley
- Steve Seepersaud

== List of schools ==
=== Elementary schools ===
- Benjamin Franklin Elementary School (K-5)
- Calvin Coolidge Elementary School (K-5)
- Horace Mann Elementary School (K-5)
- MacArthur Elementary School (K-5)
- Theodore Roosevelt Elementary School (K-5)
- Thomas Jefferson Elementary School (K-5)
- Woodrow Wilson Elementary School (K-5)

=== Middle schools ===
- East Middle (Junior High) School (6-8)
- West Middle (Junior High) School (6-8)

=== High school ===
- Binghamton High School (9-12)

== See also ==
- List of school districts in New York
