= 1938–39 Wilkes-Barre Barons season =

- League: American Basketball League (revived original)
- Head coach: Joe Dreyfus (3–9); Allie Schuckman (1–3); Dick Leary (10–10)
- General manager: Johnny Mock
- Owner(s): Johnny Mock
- Arena: Ninth Infantry Regiment Armory

Results
- Record: 14–22 (.389)
- Place: Conference: 5th
- Playoff finish: Did not qualify

The 1938–39 Wilkes-Barre Barons season was officially the eighth professional basketball season played by the Wilkes-Barre Barons franchise while they were competing in the revived version of the American Basketball League this time around. This would also be their first season competing in the revived version of the ABL after previously competing in the Pennsylvania State Basketball League and then briefly competing in the Eastern Basketball League before being an independent franchise (assuming they were still around as such at the time) up until 1938. After previously deciding to compete either as an independent team or as a minor league basketball team following their only season of play in the Eastern Basketball League (which also featured both the Original Celtics and the Trenton Tigers (or Trenton Royal Bengals) as competition there) for the 1921–22 season, the Barons would decide to enter the revived version of the ABL sixteen years later in 1938. As such, Wilkes-Barre would be one of eight teams competing in the league this season where they would utilize a proper regular season format with a proper playoff format to go alongside it. Not only that, but they would also join the Washington Heurichs works team as the only other expansion team entering the ABL (technically speaking in the case of the Wilkes-Barre Barons), with the Troy Haymakers also replacing the New York Celtics for good measure. Despite originally having an Original Celtics player in Joe Dreyfus be their head coach to start out the season, the Barons would end up performing poorly early on in the season with a 3–9 start to their season before firing him from his position. After briefly having Allie Schuckman as a player-coach for their team for four games, Dick Leary would take over as the new head coach for Wilkes-Barre for the rest of the season. While Leary would perform a lot better as a head coach (albeit while still finish with an average 10–10 record to his tenure), the combined performances throughout this season would see the Barons finish with a below-average 14–22 record for a fifth-place finish ahead of the Washington Heurichs, Brooklyn Visitations, and Troy Haymakers, but behind the New York Jewels, the defending champion Jersey Reds, the Philadelphia SPHAs, and the Kingston Colonials. As a result of their below-average finish, Wilkes-Barre would fail to qualify for the ABL Playoffs this season.

== Roster ==
Due to information on American Basketball League players being generally hard to find, there are bound to be more gaps and/or inaccuracies found in certain areas on the team's roster spots than usual.

1938–39 Wilkes-Barre Barons roster
Players

Pos.	No.	Player	Height	Weight	DOB	From
G		Don Bainbridge	5 ft 8 in (1.73 m)	155 lb (70 kg)	1913-07-06	Gettysburg
G		Merle Bainbridge	5 ft 10 in (1.78 m)	175 lb (79 kg)	1911-03-02	Scranton
C		Matty Begovich	6 ft 5 in (1.96 m)	205 lb (93 kg)	1910-10-02	St. John's
G		Jules Bender	5 ft 11 in (1.80 m)	160 lb (73 kg)	1914-04-02	Long Island
F		Ray Bowman	6 ft 1 in (1.85 m)	180 lb (82 kg)	1914-12-06	Scranton
G/F		Jim Brown	6 ft 0 in (1.83 m)	180 lb (82 kg)	1912-06-13	Temple
F		Dave Budnetz			1910-03-05	No college
G/F		Moe Dubilier	6 ft 2 in (1.88 m)	210 lb (95 kg)	1915-02-20	John Marshall University
C		Stan Entrup	6 ft 4 in (1.93 m)	205 lb (93 kg)	1907-03-16	No college
G		Ed Ganis	5 ft 10 in (1.78 m)	175 lb (79 kg)	1915-05-30	No college
G		Tommy Gliddon	5 ft 11 in (1.80 m)	170 lb (77 kg)	1914-03-22	No college
G		Jack Granahan	6 ft 1 in (1.85 m)	170 lb (77 kg)	1908-01-15	Scranton
F		Matt Guokas	6 ft 3 in (1.91 m)	195 lb (88 kg)	1915-11-11	Saint Joseph's
G		Rip Kaplinsky	5 ft 6 in (1.68 m)	155 lb (70 kg)	1912-11-13	St. John's
G		Jake Kotlow	5 ft 9 in (1.75 m)	155 lb (70 kg)	1911-07-04	Iowa
G/F		Cas Krajewski	6 ft 1 in (1.85 m)	170 lb (77 kg)	1917-09-27	No college
F/C		Dixie Lee	6 ft 0 in (1.83 m)	170 lb (77 kg)	1917	No college
G/F		Joe Mahoney	5 ft 8 in (1.73 m)	140 lb (64 kg)	1919-10-23	Scranton
G		Bibby Martens	5 ft 9 in (1.75 m)	165 lb (75 kg)	1914-07-14	John Marshall University
G		Mal McCullough			1910-12-15	Scranton
F		Charles Mosicant	6 ft 2 in (1.88 m)	205 lb (93 kg)	1912-02-20	La Salle
F		Red Paris	5 ft 8 in (1.73 m)	150 lb (68 kg)	1918-01-08	CCNY
C		Milt Perkel	6 ft 3 in (1.91 m)	210 lb (95 kg)	1901-10-30	Columbia
G/F		Allie Schuckman	5 ft 8 in (1.73 m)	155 lb (70 kg)	1907-11-25	St. John's
F		Frank Silvanic	6 ft 1 in (1.85 m)	180 lb (82 kg)	1917-12-13	No college
G		Sammy Van Hook	5 ft 11 in (1.80 m)	200 lb (91 kg)	1916-06-29	Saint Joseph's
G		Nat Volpe	5 ft 8 in (1.73 m)	155 lb (70 kg)	1916-05-15	Manhattan

Coaches
Head coach

Joe Dreyfus
Allie Schuckman
Dick Leary

Legend
- (DP) Unsigned draft pick
- (FA) Free agent
- (S) Suspended
- Injured

== American Basketball League Standings ==
Pos.	League Standings	Wins	Losses	Win %
1	Kingston Colonials	28	7	.800
2	Philadelphia SPHAs	24	9	.727
3	Jersey Reds	19	14	.576
4	New York Jewels	19	15	.559
5	Wilkes-Barre Barons	14	22	.389
6	Troy Haymakers	12	21	.364
7	Brooklyn Visitations	7	20	.259
8	Washington Heurichs	7	22	.241

The top four teams would later compete in a playoff format this season, with the best team competing against the third-best team and the second-best team competing against the fourth-best team through a best-of-three series in the semifinal round before the winning two teams from each round would go up against each other in a best-of-three championship series.
