= Marty Zippel =

American basketball player

Personal information
- Born: February 7, 1922 Philadelphia, Pennsylvania, U.S.
- Died: October 17, 2018 (aged 96) Jupiter, Florida, U.S.
- Listed height: 6 ft 2 in (1.88 m)

Career information
- High school: South Philadelphia (Philadelphia, Pennsylvania)
- College: Lafayette (1945–1949)
- NBA draft: 1949: territorial pick
- Drafted by: Baltimore Bullets
- Position: Guard

Career history
- 1949–1951: Wilkes-Barre Barons
- Stats at Basketball Reference

Martin Zippel (February 7, 1922 – October 17, 2018) was an American basketball player. He was an All-American honorable mention while playing with the Lafayette Leopards men's basketball team in the 1940s. Zippel went on to be an NBA draft selection in the 1949 BAA draft and played professionally for the Wilkes-Barre Barons.

== Early life ==
Zippel grew up in South Philly and played at South Philadelphia High School for three years.

== Playing career ==
After high school, Zippel joined the Air Force where he flew planes and played basketball. He joined Lafayette College’s basketball team in 1945.

With Lafayette, Zippel is remembered as one of the best players in program history, inducted into the Lafayette Athletics Hall of Fame in 1978. He is the first 1000 point scorer in modern Lafayette program history and dominated the Middle Atlantic Conference while being named an All-American Honorable Mention. He also played for Lafayette's baseball team.

After college, Zippel was drafted by the Baltimore Bullets in the 1949 NBA Draft. He went on to play for the Wilkes-Barre Barons.

== Halls of Fame ==
Zippel is a member of the Philadelphia Jewish Sports Hall of Fame, Luzerne County Sports Hall of Fame, South Philadelphia High School Hall of Fame, and the Lafayette College Athletics Hall of Fame.
