= Pete Pasko =

American basketball player (1919–2004)

Personal information
- Born: September 9, 1919
- Died: March 31, 2004 (aged 84) Bradford, Pennsylvania, U.S.
- Listed height: 6 ft 2 in (1.88 m)
- Listed weight: 190 lb (86 kg)

Career information
- College: East Stroudsburg (1941–1944)
- Playing career: 1944–1952
- Position: Forward

Career history

Playing
- 1944–1946: Oshkosh All-Stars
- 1946–1947: Milwaukee
- 1947–1948: New Orleans Hurricanes
- 1947–1948: West Bender Benders
- 1947–1949: Beaver Dam Olo Soap
- 1948–1950: Wilkes-Barre Barons
- 1950–1952: Williamsport

Coaching
- 1944–1945: Wayland JC

Peter Paul Pasko (September 9, 1919 – March 31, 2004) was an American professional basketball player. He played for the Oshkosh All-Stars in the National Basketball League for two seasons and averaged 6.1 points per game. Pasko's professional basketball career also led him to teams in the Professional Basketball League of America, American Basketball League, and the Eastern Basketball Association. In college, he played football, basketball, baseball, and track and field for East Stroudsburg University.
