= Jack Leighton =

American basketball player (1928–1996)

Personal information
- Born: January 25, 1928 Wilkes-Barre, Pennsylvania, U.S.
- Died: August 2, 1996 (aged 68) Wilkes-Barre, Pennsylvania, U.S.

Career information
- High school: St. Nicholas (Wilkes-Barre, Pennsylvania)
- College: Scranton (1947–1950)
- NBA draft: 1950: undrafted
- Playing career: 1950–1957

Career history
- 1950–1952: Wilkes-Barre Barons
- 1951–1952: Pottsville Packers / Wilkes-Barre Aces
- 1952–1956: Williamsport Billies
- 1956–1957: Wilkes-Barre Barons

Career highlights
- 3× EPBL champion (1952–1954); All-EPBL First Team (1954); All-EPBL Second Team (1953)

John Charles Leighton Sr. (January 25, 1928 – August 2, 1996) was an American professional basketball player.

Leighton was born in Wilkes-Barre, Pennsylvania, and attended St. Nicholas High School. He played college basketball at the University of Scranton.

Leighton played for the Wilkes-Barre Barons of the American Basketball League from 1950 to 1952. He moved to the Eastern Professional Basketball League (EPBL) during the 1951–52 season to play for the Pottsville Packers, winning an EPBL championship in 1952. Leighton joined the Williamsport Billies in 1952 and played for the team until 1956. He won another two EPBL championships with the Billies in 1953 and 1954. Leighton was selected to the All-EPBL Second Team in 1953 and the First Team in 1954. Leighton led the league in scoring with 517 points during the 1953–54 season. He finished his career with the Wilkes-Barre Barons in the EPBL during the 1956–57 season.

Leighton worked as a real estate broker and owned a real estate insurance and appraisals business in Wilkes-Barre. He died of a sudden illness in a Wilkes-Barre hospital on August 2, 1996.
