= Bill Chanecka =

American basketball player

Personal information
- Born: April 21, 1924 Binghamton, New York, U.S.
- Died: January 27, 2010 (aged 85) Binghamton, New York, U.S.
- Listed height: 6 ft 3 in (1.91 m)

Career information
- High school: Binghamton Central (Binghamton, New York)
- Playing career: 1946–1959, 1964–1965
- Position: Forward
- Coaching career: 1957–1958, 1964–1965

Career history

Playing
- 1946–1951: Wilkes-Barre Barons
- 1951–1952: Carbondale Aces
- 1952–1953: Pottsville Packers / Wilkes-Barre Aces
- 1953–1958: Williamsport Billies
- 1958–1959: Wilkes-Barre Barons
- 1964–1965: Scranton Miners

Coaching
- 1957–1958: Williamsport Billies
- 1964–1965: Scranton Miners (assistant)

Career highlights
- 5× EPBL champion (1947, 1952–1954, 1959); 2× ABL champion (1948, 1949); 2× All-EPBL First Team (1952, 1954); All-EPBL Second Team (1955); 2× ABL Most Valuable Player (1948, 1949); ABL All-Star (1949)

William James Chanecka (April 21, 1924 – January 27, 2010) was an American professional basketball player. He played most of his career in the Eastern Professional Basketball League (EPBL) where he won five championships in 1947, 1952, 1953, 1954 and 1959. Chanecka also played in the American Basketball League (ABL) where he won two championships and was selected as the ABL Most Valuable Player in 1948 and 1949.

== Early life ==
Chanecka attended Binghamton Central High School in his hometown of Binghamton, New York, where he played basketball and football. He led the basketball team to an undefeated record during his senior season. After his graduation, Chanecka played professionally for the Wilkes-Barre Barons under the alias Billy Stewart so he could preserve his collegiate eligibility. He served in the United States Navy during World War II.

Chanecka was slated to play college basketball for the NC State Wolfpack in 1946 but he was not given housing for his wife and child.

== Professional career ==
In October 1946, Chanecka signed with the Wilkes-Barre Barons to play in the newly-formed Eastern Professional Basketball League (EPBL). He played alongside his brother, Steve. Chanecka led the league in scoring with 21.9 points per game and helped the Barons win the championship his first season. The Barons joined the American Basketball League (ABL) the following season and won championships in 1948 and 1949. Chanecka was named as the league's most valuable player in 1948, and again in 1949 as well as a unanimous selection to the all-star team. He set the ABL single game scoring record with 58 points during a game in March 1949. Standing at 6 ft 3 in (1.91 m), Chanecka played as a forward and was usually assigned defensive responsibilities for the opposition's main scorer. He received interest from teams in the National Basketball Association (NBA) but his salary with the Barons was higher than what was offered elsewhere.

On November 8, 1951, Chanecka and his brother were traded to the Carbondale Aces for Joe Colone; the Chaneckas had been holdouts after their salaries were cut by the Barons management. In January 1952, Chanecka returned to the EPBL when he was signed by the Pottsville Packers. He won a championship and was named to the All-EPBL First Team in 1952. The Packers were relocated to Wilkes-Barre in November 1952 and Chanecka stayed with the team. Renamed the Wilkes-Barre Aces, the team folded on January 10, 1953, after playing four games and all of its players became free agents. Chanecka was acquired by the Williamsport Billies and debuted for them that same night. He won championships with the Billies in 1953 and 1954. He was selected to the All-EPBL First Team in 1954 and the Second Team in 1955. In December 1957, Chanecka replaced Hod Springman as head coach for the Billies. Chanecka amassed a 17–12 record during the 1957–58 season. Chanecka returned to the Barons for the 1958–59 season and won another championship.

On December 28, 1964, Chanecka was signed by the Scranton Miners as a player and assistant coach under head coach and close friend, Red Wallace. He appeared in one game in January 1965 before he decided to retire.

Chanecka was named to the Continental Basketball Association's 50th anniversary team in 1996. He was inducted in the Luzerne County Sports Hall of Fame in 2005.

== Personal life ==
During his playing career, Chanecka enrolled at Broome Tech Community College (now SUNY Broome Community College) aged 31 so he could pursue his childhood interest in electrical technology. He graduated in two years. Chanecka worked as an associate engineer at New York State Electric & Gas for 27 years.

Chanecka was married to Agnes and had four children.

Chanecka died at his home in Binghamton on January 27, 2010, aged 85.
