= Milt Ticco =

American basketball and baseball player (1922–2002)

Personal information
- Born: September 22, 1922 Jenkins, Kentucky, U.S.
- Died: January 26, 2002 (aged 79) Greenville, South Carolina, U.S.
- Listed height: 6 ft 3 in (1.91 m)
- Listed weight: 190 lb (86 kg)

Career information
- High school: Jenkins (Jenkins, Kentucky)
- College: Kentucky (1940–1943)
- Position: Forward / guard

Career history
- 1946–1947: Youngstown Bears
- 1947–1948: Flint Dow A.C.'s
- 1948: Indianapolis Kautskys
- 1948: Sheboygan Red Skins

Career highlights
- NBL All-Rookie Second Team (1947); Third-team All-American – Pic (1943)

Milton M. Ticco (September 22, 1922 – January 26, 2002) was an American basketball and minor league baseball player. An All-American basketball player at the University of Kentucky, he played two seasons in the United States' National Basketball League (NBL).

Ticco played for Adolph Rupp at Kentucky from 1940 to 1943. Following a stint in the military during World War II, he played both professional basketball and baseball. In the NBL (a precursor to today's National Basketball Association), Ticco played the 1946–47 NBL season with the Youngstown Bears and was named to the All-rookie second team. In his NBL second season, Ticco split time with the Flint Dow A.C.'s and Indianapolis Kautskys, finishing the season with the Sheboygan Red Skins. For his career, Ticco averaged 6 points per game in 60 contests.

Ticco played minor league baseball from 1946 to 1952 with the Cincinnati Reds and Brooklyn Dodgers organizations.
