= Earl Hawkins =

American basketball player

Personal information
- Born: September 23, 1920 Dora, Alabama
- Died: March 10, 2005 (aged 84) Birmingham, Alabama
- Listed height: 6 ft 4 in (1.93 m)
- Listed weight: 225 lb (102 kg)

Career information
- High school: Corner (Birmingham, Alabama)
- College: Auburn (1939–1942)
- Position: Forward

Career history
- 1947–1948: Birmingham Vulcans
- 1948: Tri-Cities Blackhawks
- 1948–1953: Wilkes-Barre Barons

Earl Albert "Shag" Hawkins (September 23, 1920 – March 10, 2005) was an American professional basketball player. He played in the National Basketball League in two games for the Tri-Cities Blackhawks during the 1948–49 season.
