= Joe Colone =

American basketball player-coach (1924–2009)

Personal information
- Born: January 23, 1924 Berwick, Pennsylvania, U.S.
- Died: July 1, 2009 (aged 85)
- Listed height: 6 ft 5 in (1.96 m)
- Listed weight: 210 lb (95 kg)

Career information
- High school: Berwick (Berwick, Pennsylvania)
- College: Bloomsburg
- BAA draft: 1948: undrafted
- Playing career: 1948–1953
- Position: Forward
- Number: 18

Career history
- 1948–1949: New York Knicks
- 1949–1950: Wilkes-Barre Barons
- 1950–1951: Allentown Aces
- 1951–1953: Wilkes-Barre Barons
- 1953: Elmira Colonels

Career BAA statistics
- Points: 83 (5.5 ppg)
- Assists: 9 (0.6 apg)
- Stats at NBA.com
- Stats at Basketball Reference

Joseph Frank "Bells" Colone (January 23, 1924 – July 1, 2009) was an American professional basketball player for the New York Knicks. Colone also played five years of Minor League Baseball.

== Early life ==
Colone attended Berwick High School in Berwick, Pennsylvania and then played basketball collegiately at Bloomsburg State Teachers College (now named Bloomsburg University of Pennsylvania).

== Professional basketball career ==
He was not drafted into the NBA but still managed to make the Knicks' roster for the 1948–49 season. At 6 feet 5 inches tall and 210 pounds, Joe played the forward position. He only played for one season in the NBA and appeared in 15 games while averaging 5.5 points.

== Minor league baseball career ==
From 1946 through 1950, Colone also competed in Minor League Baseball. He played for the Pittsfield Electrics (1946), Spartanburg Peaches (1947), Harrisburg Senators (1948), Fall River Indians (1949), Sunbury Reds (1949), and Sunbury A's (1950). As a pitcher, he recorded a 50–57 win-loss record with a 4.46 earned run average. As a hitter, Colone held a career .236 batting average.

== Personal ==
After his brief stint in the NBA, Colone migrated to Woodbury, New Jersey to teach. He taught at Woodbury Junior-Senior High School from 1954 to 1986. He was an assistant coach for the football and basketball teams there. Colone mentored rising basketball star Dave Budd, who later went on to play at Wake Forest University and then, coincidentally, the New York Knicks. Budd is still the only Woodbury High School graduate to ever reach the NBA. Budd's career lasted five seasons and he was also responsible in sharing the duty of guarding Wilt Chamberlain during his 100-point game. Budd and Colone stayed friends throughout the rest of Colone's life.

Joe "Bells" Colone died at age 83 on July 1, 2009, after many years of fighting various illnesses. He had been married to his wife Genevieve for 57 years and had five children – four sons and one daughter.

== BAA career statistics ==
Legend
GP	Games played
FG%	Field-goal percentage
FT%	Free-throw percentage
APG	Assists per game
PPG	Points per game

=== Regular season ===
Year	Team	GP	FG%	FT%	APG	PPG
1948–49	New York	15	.310	.684	.6	5.5
Career		15	.310	.684	.6	5.5

=== Playoffs ===
Year	Team	GP	FG%	FT%	APG	PPG
1949	New York	4	.233	.500	.8	4.3
Career		4	.233	.500	.8	4.3
