= Binghamton High School =

Public high school in Binghamton, New York, United States

Location
- 31 Main St. Binghamton, (Broome County), New York 13905; United States; 42°05′55″N 75°55′11″W

Information
- Type: Public high school
- School district: Binghamton City School District
- Superintendent: Tonia Thompson
- Principal: Miriam Purdy
- Teaching staff: 124.46 (FTE) (2022–2023)
- Grades: 9–12
- Gender: Coeducational
- Enrollment: 1,290 (2022–2023)
- Student to teacher ratio: 10.36 (2022–2023)
- Campus: Urban
- Colors: Red, White, and Blue
- Athletics conference: Southern Tier Athletic Conference
- Team name: Patriots
- USNWR ranking: 11,864 (870 in New York)
- Feeder schools: East and West middle schools
- Website: bhs.binghamtonschools.org

Binghamton High School, a combined high school of the previous Binghamton North High School and Binghamton Central High School, is a large public high school located in the center of Binghamton, New York. The school is culturally diverse, with 1600+ students from many countries, religions, and income levels. The mascot for Binghamton High School is a Patriot named Patrick who wears a signature tri-cornered hat.

== Education ==
Binghamton High School offers three Advanced Placement (AP) exams, in addition to classes which focus primarily on passing the Regents Examinations administered by the New York State Department of Education.

In 1997, Binghamton High School became the third high school in New York to offer the International Baccalaureate (IB) Diploma.

=== Project Lead the Way ===
A pre-engineering program called Project Lead The Way is offered to students who are interested. It includes such courses as Computer Integrated Manufacturing Systems and Engineering Design and Development. This is made possible through a partnership between the school and Rochester Institute of Technology. These courses allow students interested in going into an engineering field an opportunity to earn college credits and eliminate beginner courses in college.

=== Rod Serling School of Fine Arts ===
The Rod Serling School of Fine Arts offers the opportunity to major in visual art, music, theater and dance. Each of these programs has a wide array of groups and talented individuals that regularly perform for the community. Most of these programs (with the exception of instrumental and vocal music) are also offered at the IB level.

The school is named after the screenwriter and creator of The Twilight Zone series, Rod Serling, who is a graduate of Binghamton (Central) High School. The Helen Foley Theater, part of the school, is named after Serling's former teacher. The school hosts the annual Rod Serling Film Festival, which is open to all students in grades K-12 in North America.

== Demographics ==
The demographic breakdown by race/ethnicity of the 1,445 students enrolled for the 2018–2019 school year was:

View chart definition.

Enrollment by Race/Ethnicity
| American Indian / Alaska Native | Asian | Black | Hispanic | Native Hawaiian / Pacific Islander | White | Two or More Races |
|---|---|---|---|---|---|---|
| 0.3% | 4.4% | 28.5% | 14.3% | 0.1% | 43.8% | 8.5% |

== Athletics ==
Binghamton High School offers many programs for athletics, including men's and women's basketball teams and also a football team. Binghamton High competes in the STAC conference for most sports, with the exception of football, which competes in Section 4 Class AA.

The football team at Binghamton High School has won several titles since their first season in 1981, including the Section 4 title in 1985, 1987, 1991, 1992, 1993, 2004, 2008, 2011, 2012, 2016 and Central Region titles in 2008 and 2011. The team also won a New York State title in 1985.

The boys' and girls' basketball teams have also won titles. The boys' team won back-to-back state titles in the 1984–85 and 1985–1986 seasons, along with another one in the 2024–25 season. The women's team has done well in recent years, winning both conference (STAC) and sectional (NYS Sec. IV) titles in the 2009–10, 2010–11, and 2011–2012 seasons. In 2011–2012, both the boys' and girls' teams won at least 20 games, including conference and sectional titles, to enter the State Playoffs with undefeated records.

The boys' track & field team won a divisional title in 2011.

In baseball, the school won Division titles in 1985, 1987, 1998, and 2005; as well as Section 4 titles in 1985 and 1987.

== Recognitions ==
On the Newsweek's list of the Best High Schools in America for 2007, Binghamton High School was ranked #481 out of approximately 1,200 top high schools in the United States, based on the number of participants in AP and IB courses.

Binghamton High School has one of very few high school-level steel drum bands in the United States.

Along with the musical aspect of the school's arts programs, the school puts on a selected play and full-scale musical every year. Theater Production Club builds the sets and operates the show while anyone from the student body can try out for roles.

== Notable alumni ==
- Henry Arthur Callis – Class of 1905; one of the founders of Alpha Phi Alpha Fraternity Inc. at Cornell University in 1906, a physician and professor at Howard University
- Steve Davis - Class of 1985; American jazz trombonist
- Billy Gabor – Former point guard at Syracuse University and later professionally with the Syracuse Nationals
- Barry Goldstein – Class of 1980; golf instructor
- Mark D. McCormack – Class of 1984; US Army major general
- King Rice – Class of 1987; Former North Carolina Basketball player, current head men's basketball coach at Monmouth University
- Arthur J. Ruland – Class of 1904; lawyer and member of the New York State Assembly
- Rod Serling – Six time Emmy Award winner, creator and host of the television series The Twilight Zone
- Jessamine S. Whitney – Class of 1897; statistician for the National Tuberculosis Association
- Katie Wilson – Class of 2000; mayor of Seattle, WA
- Edward W. Stack - Dick's Sporting Goods
- Colbie Young – Class of 2021; college football wide receiver for the Lackawanna Falcons, the Miami Hurricanes, and the Georgia Bulldogs
