= Wilkes-Barre Barons =

- Leagues: EPBL; 1946–1947; ABL; 1947–1953; EPBL; 1954–1970; EBA; 1970–1978; CBA; 1978–1980
- Founded: 1914
- History: Wilkes-Barre Barons; 1914–1978
- Arena: Kingston Armory
- Location: Kingston, Pennsylvania
- Team colors: Green, yellow, white
- Ownership: Eddie White
- Championships: 11; EPBL: 6 (1947, 1955, 1956, 1958, 1959, 1969); ABL: 3 (1948, 1949, 1952); EBA: 2 (1973, 1978)
Home

The Wilkes-Barre Barons were a basketball team from Wilkes-Barre, Pennsylvania.

The Barons played between 1914 and 1980 in different American leagues. Originally, during those early seasons of existence, Wilkes-Barre competed first in the Pennsylvania State Basketball League and then in briefly in the Eastern Basketball League (specifically in a season where the Naismith Basketball Hall of Fame team known as the Original Celtics were competition for them to go up against). Once the team returned to action in the 1940s, the team won 11 titles from this time, including while playing in both the revived version of the original American Basketball League and the league that eventually became the Continental Basketball Association. The team was owned and coached by Eddie White, Sr. They played in the Kingston Armory, as well as Kings College and Coughlin High School, in their latter years.

== Wilkes-Barre Barons (PSBL) ==
Originally, the Wilkes-Barre Barons first existed as a franchise back in 1914 while operating in the local Pennsylvania State Basketball League. They would remain competitive in that league until that league first suspended operations during the period of World War I and then folded operations in 1921.

== Wilkes-Barre Barons (EBL) ==
After the PSBL folded operations in 1921, the Wilkes-Barre Barons moved their operations out into the Eastern Basketball League, which featured the Trenton (Royal) Bengals and later the Original Celtics as competitive teams there. They would only stay in the EBL for one season before (likely) competing as an independent franchise until 1938.

== Wilkes-Barre Barons (ABL) I ==
The Wilkes-Barre Barons were an American basketball team based in Wilkes-Barre, Pennsylvania that was originally a member of the revived version of the American Basketball League from 1938 until 1940.

During the 1939/40 season, the team dropped out of the league on February 2, 1940.

=== Year-by-year ===
Year	League	Reg. season	Playoffs
1938/39	ABL	5th	did not qualify
1939/40	ABL	6th	N/A

== Wilkes-Barre Barons (ABL) II / Wilkes-Barre Barons (EPBL/EBA/CBA) ==
The Wilkes-Barre Barons were an American basketball team based in Wilkes-Barre, Pennsylvania that was a member of the Eastern Pennsylvania Basketball League and the American Basketball League. The franchise was one of six original teams in the EPBL, and won the 1946-1947 President's Cup playoffs that season before moving to the American Basketball League. During their time spent in the final years of the original American Basketball League, Wilkes-Barre would threaten to leave the league multiple times (despite them winning the league's championship three times during their second stay in the ABL), to the point where they briefly would leave the league near the end of the 1950–51 season due to a $1,500 bond demand from the Scranton Miners. In addition to that notable issue, the Barons would also look into defecting from the ABL to the rivaling Basketball Association of America (now National Basketball Association) at first before the start of the 1948–49 season and then the rivaling National Basketball League before the NBL merged operations with the BAA to become the NBA for the 1949–50 NBA season, both of which resulted in Wilkes-Barre staying in the ABL following those failed defections from the struggling ABL. In 1955, the Barons returned to the Eastern League, and won seven more championships between 1955 and 1978. The aftereffects of Hurricane Agnes forced the Barons to fold midway through the 1973-74 season; the team returned to action for the 1975-76 season. For the 1979-80 season they were rebranded as the Pennsylvania Barons; this would be the team's last year in Wilkes-Barre. (The team played the 1980-81 CBA season in Scranton as the Scranton Aces before later returning as the Wilkes-Barre Barons in the forgotten minor leagues known as the American Basketball Association and the National American Basketball Association for the 1981-82 and 1982-83 seasons respectively before folding operations completely.)

=== Year-by-year ===
Year	League	Reg. season	Playoffs
1946/47	EPBL	1st	Champion
1947/48	ABL	1st	Champion
1948/49	ABL	1st	Champion
1949/50	ABL	3rd	Playoffs
1950/51	ABL	2nd	No playoff
1951/52	ABL	3rd	Champion
1952/53	ABL	2nd	Finals
1953/54	n/a	Did not play	
1954/55	EPBL	2nd	Champion
1955/56	EPBL	2nd	Champion
1956/57	EPBL	5th	No playoff
1957/58	EPBL	1st	Champion
1958/59	EPBL	2nd	Champion
1959/60	EPBL	6th	No playoff
1960/61	EPBL	tied 4th	No playoff
1961/62	EPBL	5th	No playoff
1962/63	EPBL	3rd	Finals
1963/64	EPBL	5th	No playoff
1964/65	EPBL	6th	No playoff
1965/66	EPBL	1st, West	Finals
1966/67	EPBL	4th, West	Playoffs
1967/68	EPBL	3rd	Finals
1968/69	EPBL	1st, West	Champion
1969/70	EPBL	5th	No playoff
1970/71	EBA	4th, West	No playoff
1971/72	EBA	tied 5th	No playoff
1972/73	EBA	2nd	Champion
1973/74	EBA	folded midseason	
1974/75	n/a	Did not play	
1975/76	EBA	7th	No playoff
1976/77	EBA	4th	No playoff
1977/78	EBA	2nd, West	Champion
1978/79	CBA	1st, South	Playoffs
1979/80	CBA	2nd, South	Playoffs
